= Miss Virgin Islands' Outstanding Teen =

- Formation: 2005
- Type: Beauty pageant
- Members: Miss America's Teen
- Official language: English

The Miss Virgin Islands' Outstanding Teen competition is the pageant that previously selected the representative for the U.S. Virgin Islands in the Miss America's Outstanding Teen pageant. However, a representative from the U.S. Virgin Islands has not been selected for the national pageant since 2015.

== Results summary ==
The year in parentheses indicates the year of the Miss America's Outstanding Teen competition, in which the award/placement was garnered.

=== Placements ===
- Top 10: CeReyna Jade Bougouneau (2015)

=== Awards ===
- America's Choice Award: CeReyna Jade Bougouneau (2015)

== Winners ==
- Declared as Winner
- Ended as a runner-up
- Ended as a finalist or semi-finalist

Year	Name	Hometown	Age	Talent	Placement at MAO Teen	Special scholarships at MAO Teen	Notes
2025	Has not sent representatives since 2016 for the 2017 contest and onwards. No contest in 2020 for Miss America's Teen 2021 due to the COVID-19 pandemic.						
2024	Has not sent representatives since 2016 for the 2017 contest and onwards. No contest in 2020 for Miss America's Teen 2021 due to the COVID-19 pandemic.						
2023	Has not sent representatives since 2016 for the 2017 contest and onwards. No contest in 2020 for Miss America's Teen 2021 due to the COVID-19 pandemic.						
2022	Has not sent representatives since 2016 for the 2017 contest and onwards. No contest in 2020 for Miss America's Teen 2021 due to the COVID-19 pandemic.						
2021	Has not sent representatives since 2016 for the 2017 contest and onwards. No contest in 2020 for Miss America's Teen 2021 due to the COVID-19 pandemic.						
2019-2020	Has not sent representatives since 2016 for the 2017 contest and onwards. No contest in 2020 for Miss America's Teen 2021 due to the COVID-19 pandemic.						
2018	Has not sent representatives since 2016 for the 2017 contest and onwards. No contest in 2020 for Miss America's Teen 2021 due to the COVID-19 pandemic.						
2017	Has not sent representatives since 2016 for the 2017 contest and onwards. No contest in 2020 for Miss America's Teen 2021 due to the COVID-19 pandemic.						
2016	Has not sent representatives since 2016 for the 2017 contest and onwards. No contest in 2020 for Miss America's Teen 2021 due to the COVID-19 pandemic.						
2015	Keshaundia Quinn	St. Croix	15	Vocal			
2014	CeReyna Jade Bougouneau	St. Croix	16		Top 10	America's Choice Award	
2013	Did not send representative						
2012	Allayeah John-Baptiste	St. Croix	16	Ballet en Pointe			
2011	Kaylah Galloway	St. Croix					
2010	Brittney Parillon	St. Croix					
2009	A'Jada Burke	St. Croix					
2008	Brittany Rodriguez	St. Thomas		Broadway Vocal, "You Can't Stop the Beat" from Hairspray			
2007	Reisha Alyssa Corneiro	St. Croix					
2006	Esonica Veira	St. Thomas		Hip Hop Dance			Later Miss World US Virgin Islands 2011; Top 15 at Miss World 2011 pageant Later Miss US Paradise Supranational 2013; 4th runner-up at Miss Supranational 2013 pageant Later Miss Earth US Virgin Islands 2014 Later Miss US Virgin Islands 2017
2005	Shakyma Roshundia Mercado	St. Croix		Sign Language/Dance			
