= Miss Maine's Teen =

- Formation: 2005
- Type: Beauty pageant
- Location: Auburn, Maine
- Members: Miss America's Teen
- Official language: English
- Key people: Karen Perry-Thames
- Website: Official website

For the state pageant affiliated with Miss Teen USA, see Miss Maine Teen USA

The Miss Maine's Teen competition is the pageant that selects the representative for the U.S. state of Maine in the Miss America's Teen pageant.

Johanna Cote of Presque Isle was crowned Miss Maine's Teen on June 27, 2026, at the Donald M. Gay Performing Arts Center in Auburn, Maine. She competed for the title of Miss America's Teen 2027 on September 5, 2026, at the Kravis Center for the Performing Arts in West Palm Beach, Florida.

In January 2023, the official name of the pageant was changed from Miss Maine's Outstanding Teen, to Miss Maine's Teen, in accordance with the national pageant.

== Results summary ==
The year in parentheses indicates year of Miss America's Outstanding Teen competition the award/placement was garnered.

=== Awards ===
==== Non-finalist Awards ====
- Non-finalist Talent: Madison Leslie (2016)

==== Other Awards ====
- Outstanding Vocal: Madison Leslie (2016)

== Winners ==
Year	Name	Hometown	Age	Talent	Placement at MAO Teen	Special scholarships at MAO Teen	Notes
2026	Johanna Cote	Presque Isle	18	Jazz Dance			
2025	Alana LaCourse	East Boothbay	16	Tap Dance			Later Miss Maine High School America 2026
2024	Eva Benjamin	Bangor	17	HERStory			
2023	Leah Herrick	Auburn	16	HERStory			
2022	Lexi Alcott	Windsor		Monologue			
2021	Lauren Jorgensen	Winthrop	18	Vocal, "The Rainbow Connection"			
2019-20	Jane Lipp	New Gloucester	16	Vocal, "Imagine"			
2018	Macy Grant	Brunswick	16	Contemporary Dance			
2017	Briley Bell	Lewiston	16	Vocal			
2016	Madison Leslie	Lewiston	16	Vocal, "Rise Up"		Non-finalist Talent Award Outstanding Vocal Award	Later Miss Maine 2022
2015	Alexis Wintle	Windham	17	Vocal			
2014	Madeline Jarvis	Hollis Center	15	Vocal			
2013	Daphne Ellis	Turner	16	Ballet en Pointe			
2012	Katie Elliott	Scarborough	17	Vocal			Later Miss Maine 2017
2011	Alison Folsom	Saco	16				
2010	Marybeth Noonan	Raymond	15	Vocal, “I Enjoy Being a Girl” from Flower Drum Song			Later Miss Maine 2016
2009	Kristin Korda	Saco	17	Vocal			Later Miss Maine 2013
2008	Shannon Folsom	Saco	17	Vocal			Older sister of Miss Maine's Outstanding Teen 2011, Alison Folsom Later Miss Collegiate America 2011
2007	Erin Buck	Caribou	15	Vocal			Later Maine's Junior Miss 2010
2006	Mallory Lavole	Madawaska	16	Piano			
2005	Katelyn Smith	Enfield	16	Tap Dance			
