= Miss Nevada's Teen =

Youth beauty pageant in Nevada, USA

- Formation: 2005
- Type: Beauty pageant
- Headquarters: Sparks
- Location: Nevada
- Members: Miss America's Teen
- Official language: English
- Website: Official website

The Miss Nevada's Teen competition is the pageant that selects the representative for the U.S. state of Nevada in Miss America's Teen pageant.

Charlize Kruczynski of Las Vegas was crowned Miss Nevada's Teen on June 27, 2026, at Bally's Lake Tahoe in Stateline, Nevada. She competed for the title of Miss America's Teen 2027 on September 5, 2026, at the Kravis Center for the Performing Arts in West Palm Beach, Florida.

== Results summary ==
The year in parentheses indicates the Miss America's Outstanding Teen competition the award/placement was garnered.

=== Placements ===
- Top 10: Lauren Watson (2016)

=== Awards ===
==== Other awards ====
- Miss Congeniality/Spirit of America: Amy Smith (2015)
- America's Choice: Lauren Watson (2016)
- Non-finalist Interview: Tia Henderson (2019)
- Teens in Action Award Winners: Amy Smith (2015)
- Teens in Action Award Finalists: Ellie Smith (2013), Megan Dwyer (2023)

== Winners ==
- Declared as winner
- Ended as a runner-up
- Ended as a finalist or semi-finalist

Year	Name	Hometown	Age	Local title	Talent	Placement at MAO Teen	Special scholarships at MAO Teen	Notes
2026	Charlize Kruczynski	Las Vegas	18	Miss Henderson’s Teen	Jazz Dance			Previously Nevada Cinderella Teen 2023-2024
2025	Tahmea Dowdell	Reno	17	Miss Lake Tahoe's Teen	Vocal			
2024	Ava Itchev	Las Vegas	16	Miss Las Vegas' Teen	Jazz Dance			
2023	Bella Hawkins	Las Vegas	17	Miss North Las Vegas' Teen	Dance			
2022	Megan Dwyer	Elko	16	Miss Henderson's Outstanding Teen	Monologue		Teens in Action Finalist	
2021	Isabella McGinnis	Las Vegas	16	Miss Red Rock's Outstanding Teen	Tap dance, "Proud Mary" by Ike & Tina Turner			
2019-20	Molly Martin	Henderson	16	Miss Las Vegas’ Outstanding Teen	Vocal, "Astonishing" from Little Women			Daughter of Miss Texas 1983, Dana Rogers Martin
2018	Tia Henderson	Reno	17	Miss Virginia City's Outstanding Teen	Jazz dance, "No Excuses"		Non-finalist Interview Award	
2017	Carli Gumm	Minden	16	Miss Carson County's Outstanding Teen	Dance			Younger sister of Bailey Gumm, Miss Nevada's Outstanding Teen 2011 and Miss Nevada 2016
2016	Heather Renner	Reno	16		Vocal			Later Miss Nevada 2022 and Top 7 at Miss America 2023
2015	Lauren Watson	Las Vegas	16	Miss Lake Mead's Outstanding Teen	Ballet en pointe	Top 10	America's Choice Award	
2014	Amy Smith	Henderson	15	Miss Northeast Nevada's Outstanding Teen			Teens in Action Award Spirit of America Award	Younger sister of Ellie Smith, Miss Nevada's Outstanding Teen 2012 and Miss Nevada 2014
2013	Katarina Clark	Reno	15	Miss Northern Counties' Outstanding Teen	Lyrical dance			
2012	Ellie Smith	Henderson	15		Vocal		Teens in Action Award Finalist	Older sister of Amy Smith, Miss Nevada's Outstanding Teen 2014 Later Miss Nevada 2014
2011	Bailey Gumm	Minden	15	Miss Lake Tahoe's Outstanding Teen	Tap dance			Older sister of Carli Gumm, Miss Nevada's Outstanding Teen 2017 Later Miss Nevada 2016
2010	Angela Foremaster	North Las Vegas		Miss Clark County's Outstanding Teen				
2009	Jordan Orris	Henderson	15	Miss Lake Las Vegas Area's Outstanding Teen				Later Distinguished Young Woman of Nevada 2012
2008	Alexis Hilts	Las Vegas	14		Piano			Later Miss Nevada 2018
2007	Gabrielle Boyadjian	Las Vegas	14		Vocal			Later Miss Teen California United States 2011
2006	Jordan Bowler	Mesquite			Freestyle taekwondo routine			
2005	Raechel Prosser	Gardnerville	15		Dance			
