= Miss Wyoming's Teen =

American scholarship pageant

- Formation: 2005
- Type: Beauty pageant
- Headquarters: Sheridan
- Location: Wyoming
- Members: Miss America's Teen
- Official language: English
- Key people: Shannen Carroll
- Website: Official website

The Miss Wyoming's Teen competition is the pageant that selects the representative for the U.S. state of Wyoming in the Miss America's Teen pageant.

Jenna Hansen of Sheridan was crowned Miss Wyoming's Teen on June 6, 2026, at the WYO Performing Arts and Education Center in Sheridan, Wyoming. She competed for the title of Miss America's Teen 2027 on September 5, 2026, at the Kravis Center for the Performing Arts in West Palm Beach, Florida.

== Results summary ==
The results of Miss Wyoming's Teen as they participated in the national Miss America's Teen competition. The year in parentheses indicates the year of the Miss America's Teen competition the award/placement was garnered.

=== Awards ===
- Spirit of America: Montana Sannes (2012)
- Miss Photogenic: Jessica Power (2013)

== Winners ==
Year	Name	Hometown	Age	Local title	Talent	Placement at MAO Teen	Special scholarships at MAO Teen	Notes
2026	Jenna Hansen	Sheridan	18	Miss Sheridan's Teen	HER Story			
2025	Alivia Denzin	Sheridan	17	Miss Cloud Peak's Teen	Contemporary Dance			
2024	Carlyn Murray	Cody	14	Miss Cody's Teen	Irish Dance			
2023	Katelyn Reckard	Sheridan	16	N/A				
2022	Anna Mullinax	Sheridan	15	Miss Sheridan's Outstanding Teen	Piano			First Asian American to be crowned Miss Wyoming's Outstanding Teen
2021	Cassandra "Cassie" Guelde	Story	18	Miss Northeast Wyoming's Outstanding Teen	Vocal			
2019-20	Hannah Moore	Rock Springs	17	-	Contemporary Lyrical Dance			
2018	Taylor Greig	Sheridan	17	-	Contemporary Dance			
2017	Amelia Beck Winter	Wheatland	16	-				
2016	Rae'Lee Klein	Cheyenne	17	-				
2015	Olivia Boley	Sheridan	15	-	Modern Dance			
2014	Addison Treesh	Gillette	14	-	Dance			Later Miss Wyoming USA 2019
2013	Jordan Snyder	Buffalo	16	Miss Buffalo's Outstanding Teen	Piano			Later Distinguished Young Woman of Wyoming 2015
2012	Jessica Power	Cody	15	Miss Cody's Outstanding Teen	Tap Dance		Miss Photogenic	
2011	Montana Sannes	Lander	16	Miss Hot Springs' Outstanding Teen			Spirit of America Award	
2010	Chelsea Price	Rock Springs	17	Miss Rock Springs' Outstanding Teen				2nd runner-up at Miss Wyoming 2017 pageant Semi-finalist at Miss Wyoming USA 2021
2009	Morgan Mariner	Douglas	13	Miss Douglas' Outstanding Teen				
2008	Marcella Bledsoe	Sheridan	13	Miss Sheridan's Outstanding Teen	Vocal, "Journey to the Past"			
2007	Ashley Golden	Gillette	13	Miss Campbell County's Outstanding Teen				
2006	Codie Lee Ann Murphy	Sheridan	17	Miss Sheridan's Outstanding Teen	Japanese Fan Dance			
2005	Courtney Gifford	Sheridan	17	Miss Sheridan's Outstanding Teen	Vocal			First Miss America's Outstanding Teen contestant to win a Miss America state title Later Miss Wyoming USA 2013
