= Azalea Trail Maids =

High school ambassadors for Mobile, Alabama

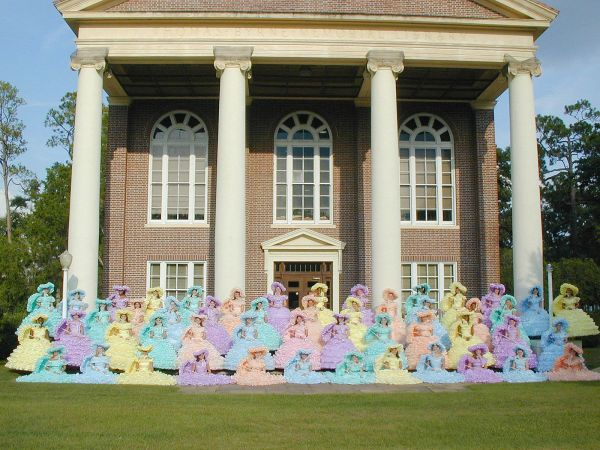
The 2002-2003 Azalea Trail Court, on the campus of Spring Hill College.

The Azalea Trail Maids is a group of fifty high school seniors chosen yearly to serve as "Official Ambassadors" for the city of Mobile, Alabama, United States. The Maids, wearing dresses meant to evoke Southern charm and hospitality, make appearances at many local, state, and national events. They often serve as greeters when foreigners and dignitaries visit the city, and are required to be knowledgeable about the city landmarks and history. In addition, they must have a good grade point average to be accepted and have great interview skills. The Maids are selected through a dual interview process, interviewing at the school and county level. Hundreds of girls initially try out, but only fifty become Azalea Trail Maids. The Maids are meant to embody the ideals of "Southern hospitality", and appeared at the inauguration of United States President Barack Obama.

== History ==
The group gained its name from Mobile's Azalea Trail, a garden trail within the city. The trail traces its beginnings to an effort by the Mobile Junior Chamber of Commerce during the 1920s that saw the planting of azaleas along the city's streets. Following the establishment of the trail, dignitaries were invited to officially open the trail each spring, with local debutantes serving as event hostesses. This arrangement changed in 1949, with the establishment of the first Azalea Trail Court. The court featured two senior girls sent from each of the four local high schools.

The Azalea Trail Festival was established in 1951, with additional girls from neighboring Jaycees organizations invited to serve on the court. During this period the reigning Miss America served on the court as the Queen of the Azalea Trail. The event became so popular that, by the mid-1950s, each Jaycee chapter in Alabama, and a few from other states, had a representative at the festival. It was decided to limit the size of the court to fifty senior girls from Mobile County high schools. The court has remained in this arrangement since that time. A new program was started for the out-of-town girls, leading directly to the establishment of America's Junior Miss.

== Inaugural controversy ==
Controversy erupted in January 2009, after the group was invited by the inauguration committee of Barack Obama to represent Alabama in the inaugural parade. The president of the Alabama State Conference of the NAACP, Edward Vaughn, made the statements that another group should represent Alabama in the parade to better reflect the history of the state, that the antebellum-style costumes that the Maids wear are a reminder of the slave era, and that the group would be a “laughingstock.” Advocates of the Maids defended the organization, citing that the dresses are also meant to represent azalea blossoms and that the group is racially diverse. Following Vaughn's comments Sam Jones, the first African American mayor of Mobile, issued a written statement:

The Azalea Trail girls represent the beauty of Mobile. After all, we are the Azalea city. We are extremely proud of their participation in President-elect Barack Obama's inauguration and can think of no better group that represents the character and diversity of our city to showcase at this historic event. As it relates to diversity, we would compare Mobile with any city in the state of Alabama. We are a diverse city representing people from all segments and walks of life. These girls epitomize that, and they are excellent ambassadors for Mobile.

Alvin Holmes, Alabama's longest-serving African American state legislator, commented that:

I think it would be better for the image of the state of Alabama to have another group participate also. We have some top high school bands around the state of Alabama. But the fact that the Trail Maids are integrated, makes it okay to me. They didn't have anything to do with slavery.

The Mobile County Commission gave US$10,000 to help fund the Maids' trips to the inauguration. Vaughn later apologized for calling the group a laughingstock, but continued to express his view that an additional group from Alabama representing the civil rights movement should march with the Maids for the inauguration of the first African American president of the United States. A segment concerning the controversy was filmed for NBC's Today show, but never aired because of other news coverage. The Maids participated in the parade on January 20, 2009.
