= Miss Delaware's Teen =

- Formation: 2005
- Type: Beauty pageant
- Headquarters: Dover
- Location: Delaware
- Members: Miss America's Teen
- Official language: English
- Executive Director & President: Sue Kuhling
- Website: Official website

For the state pageant affiliated with Miss Teen USA, see Miss Delaware Teen USA

The Miss Delaware's Teen competition is the pageant that selects the representative of Delaware in the Miss America's Teen pageant.

In January 2023, the official name of the pageant was changed from Miss Delaware’s Outstanding Teen to Miss Delaware’s Teen, in accordance with the national pageant.

Erin Mayo of Lewes was crowned Miss Delaware's Teen on June 19, 2026, at the Thompson Theatre at the University of Delaware in Newark, Delaware. She competed for the title of Miss America's Teen 2027 on September 5, 2026, at the Kravis Center for the Performing Arts in West Palm Beach, Florida.

== Results summary ==
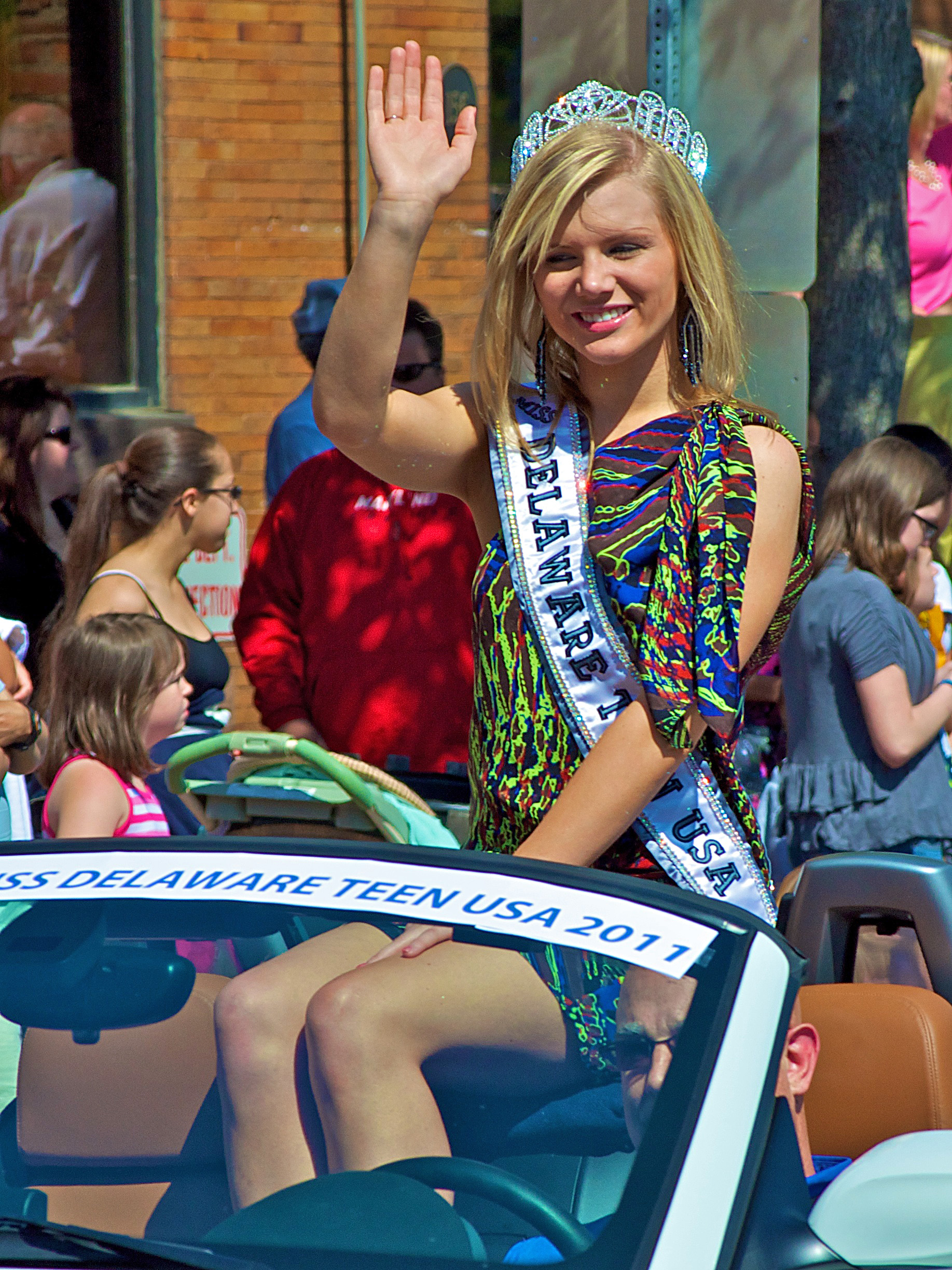
Amanda Debus, Miss Delaware's Outstanding Teen 2008, Miss Delaware Teen USA 2011 & Miss Delaware 2016

The year in parentheses indicates year of Miss America's Teen competition the award/placement was garnered.

=== Awards ===
==== Preliminary awards ====
- Preliminary Talent: Chelsea Betts (2008)

==== Non-finalist awards ====
- Non-finalist Talent: Chelsea Betts (2008)

==== Other awards ====
- Teens in Action Award Winners: Jaqueline Means (2020) (tie)
- Outstanding Achievement in Academic Life Award: Ashley Swanson (2017)
- Random Acts of Kindness Award: Grace Otley (2015)
- Spirit of America Award: Tanee' De Costa (2014)

== Winners ==
Year	Name	Hometown	Age	Local title	Talent	Placement at MAO Teen	Special scholarships at MAO Teen	Notes
2026	Erin Mayo	Lewes	14	Miss Coastal Delaware’s Teen	Irish Dance			
2025	Avery Eileen Martinenza	Newark	18	Miss Wilmington's Teen	HERStory, “For the Ones Still Fighting”			
2024	Gabrielle Morgan	Magnolia	17	Miss Kent County’s Teen	Dance, “Sparkling Diamonds”			Injured her leg just prior to Miss America’s Teen, so changed talent to HERStory
2023	Sophia Hughes	Wilmington	17	Miss Wilmington's Teen	Vocal, “The Prayer”			Miss Delaware Collegiate America 2026
2022	Brynn String	Felton	14	At-Large	Tap Dance, “Confident”			Daughter of Miss Delaware 1996, Aimee Michelle Voshell
2021	Haley Alexander	Wilmington	18	At-Large	Contemporary Dance, "Stand Tall"			
2019-20	Jaqueline Means	Wilmington	16	Miss Diamond State's Outstanding Teen	Acro-Jazz Fusion Dance, "Circle of Life" & "Wanna Be Startin' Somethin'"		Teens in Action Award Winner (tie)	3rd runner-up at Miss Pennsylvania 2023. Founder of the Wilmington Urban STEM Initiative.
2018	Sky Knox	Newark	16	Miss Newark's Outstanding Teen	Lyrical Gymnastic Routine, "Titanium"			Later 2nd runner-up at Miss Delaware Teen USA 2020 Later Miss Delaware Teen USA 2021
2017	Nicole Hannah	Middletown	15	Miss Wilmington's Outstanding Teen	Baton Twirling			Overall and Non-Finalist talent at Miss Delaware 2025
2016	Ashley Swanson	Wilmington	16	Miss Wilmington's Outstanding Teen	Speed Painting	Miss Blue/Gold 2020	Outstanding Achievement in Academic Life Award	
2015	Michelle Ley	Wilmington	16	Miss New Castle County's Outstanding Teen	Vocal, "On My Own" from Les Misérables			3rd runner-up at Miss New York 2018 and 2019 pageants
2014	Grace Otley	Hockessin	14	Miss Greenville's Outstanding Teen	Vocal		Random Acts of Kindness Award	Later 3rd runner-up at Miss Delaware USA 2021 Later Miss Delaware 2022
2013	Tanee' De Costa	Middletown	16	Miss Middletown's Outstanding Teen	Tahitian Dance		Spirit of America Award	
2012	Morgan Burris	Middletown	16	Miss Wilmington's Outstanding Teen	Vocal			
2011	Victoria Brown-O'Brien	Magnolia	16	Miss Diamond State's Outstanding Teen	Ballet en Pointe, “La Esmeralda”			
2010	Katelynn Mayers	Newark	15	Miss New Castle County's Outstanding Teen	Dance			1st runner-up at Miss Delaware 2016 pageant
2009	Danielle Marshall	Middletown	15	Miss New Castle County's Outstanding Teen	Gymnastic Dance			
2008	Amanda Debus	Middletown	15	Miss New Castle County Jr Teen	Baton/Dance			Later, Miss Delaware Teen USA 2011 Later, Miss Delaware 2016 3rd runner-up at Miss Delaware USA 2018 1st runner-up at Miss Delaware USA 2019
2007	Chelsea Betts	Georgetown	15	Miss Sussex County's Outstanding Teen	Vocal		Non-finalist Talent Award Preliminary Talent Award	
2006	Lauren Gagliardino	Bear	16	Miss New Castle County's Outstanding Teen	Tap Dance			
2005	Carly Economos	Georgetown	16		Vocal			Contestant at National Sweetheart 2009 pageant
