= Miss Minnesota's Teen =

- Formation: 2005
- Type: Beauty pageant
- Location: Cottage Grove, Minnesota
- Members: Miss America's Teen
- Official language: English
- Key people: Pam Poston (Director)
- Website: Official website

The Miss Minnesota's Teen competition is the pageant that selects the representative for the U.S. state of Minnesota in the Miss America's Teen pageant.

Natalia Yurecko of Chanhassen was crowned Miss Minnesota's Teen on June 19, 2026, at the Treasure Island Resort & Casino in Welch, Minnesota. She competed for the title of Miss America's Teen 2027 on September 5, 2026, at the Kravis Center for the Performing Arts in West Palm Beach, Florida.

== Results summary ==
The results of Miss Minnesota's Teen as they participated in the national Miss America's Teen competition. The year in parentheses indicates the year of the Miss America's Teen competition the award/placement was garnered.

=== Placements ===
- 3rd runners-up: Julia Schumacher (2023), Natalia Yurecko (2027)
- 4th runners-up: Alexis Houle (2012)
- Top 12: Emily Schumacher (2018)

=== Awards ===
==== Preliminary awards ====
- Preliminary Evening Wear/On-Stage Question: Alexis Houle (2012), Julia Schumacher (2023)

==== Other awards ====
- Academic Achievement Award: Natalie Davis (2007), Chantal Wilson (2008)
- America's Choice: Emily Schumacher (2018)
- National Fundraiser Award 4th Runner-up: Julia Schumacher (2023)
- Teens in Action Award Finalists: Corrina Swiggum (2014), Rachel Weyandt (2016)

== Winners ==
- Declared as Winner
- Ended as a runner-up
- Ended as a finalist or semi-finalist

| Year | Name | Hometown | Age | Local title | Talent | Placement at MAO Teen | Special scholarships at MAO Teen | Notes |
|---|---|---|---|---|---|---|---|---|
| 2026 | Natalia Yurecko | Chanhassen | 17 | Miss River Valley’s Teen | Piano | 3rd runner-up | | Previously 2024 NAM Minnesota Jr. Teen |
| 2025 | Lily Geyer | Lakeville | 17 | Miss Twin Cities Teen | Lyrical Dance | | | |
| 2024 | Brynn Olson | Thief River Falls | 17 | Miss Northern Lakes Teen | Jazz Dance | | | |
| 2023 | Natalie Berg | Coon Rapids | 16 | Miss Heart of the Lakes' Teen | Hardshoe Irish Dance | | | Title changed to Miss Minnesota's Teen |
| 2022 | Julia Schumacher | Mankato | 17 | Miss Coon Rapids' Outstanding Teen | Lyrical Dance | 3rd Runner-up | Preliminary Evening Wear/OSQ Award National Fundraiser 4th Runner-up | Younger sister of Miss Minnesota's Outstanding Teen 2017 and Miss Minnesota 2024, Emily Rae Schumacher. 1st Runner Up at Miss Alabama 2026. Miss Hoover (AL) 2027 |
| 2020–2021 (Note: State competition took place in Brainerd, MN on March 14, 2020, as national pageant postponed to 2021 for the 2022 edition due to the COVID-19 pandemic.) | Bella Grill | Lino Lakes | 15 | Miss Granite City's Outstanding Teen | Lyrical Dance, "Humble and Kind" | | | |
| 2019 | Rachel Luchsinger | Woodbury | 16 | Miss St. Croix Valley's Outstanding Teen | Piano, "Don't Stop Me Now" by Queen | | | |
| 2018 | Eden Webb | Minnetonka | 16 | Miss St. Croix Valley's Outstanding Teen | Contemporary Dance, "Lost" | | | Miss Tennessee Valley 2022 |
| 2017 | Emily Rae Schumacher | Mankato | 17 | Miss Mankato's Outstanding Teen | Lyrical Dance | Top 12 | America's Choice | 3rd runner-up at Miss Minnesota 2019 competition 4th runner-up at Miss Minnesota 2021 and 2022 Older sister of Miss Minnesota's Outstanding Teen 2022, Julia Schumacher Later Miss Minnesota 2024 |
| 2016 | Cali Weddle | Andover | | Miss River Valley's Outstanding Teen | Vocal/Guitar | | | |
| 2015 | Rachel Weyandt | Lino Lakes | 16 | Miss Chain of Lakes' Outstanding Teen | Piano | | Teens in Action Award Finalist | Top 12 at Miss Minnesota 2022 |
| 2014 | Lauren Algyer | Prior Lake | | Miss Southern Valley's Outstanding Teen | Monologue | | | |
| 2013 | Corrina Swiggum | Prior Lake | 15 | Miss South Central's Outstanding Teen | Martial Arts | | Teens in Action Award Finalist | |
| 2012 | Bailey Wachholz | Nisswa | 16 | Miss Brainerd Lakes' Outstanding Teen | Piano | | | |
| 2011 | Alexis Houle | Duluth | 16 | | Vocal | 4th runner-up | Preliminary Evening Wear/OSQ Award | Previously USA National Jr. Teen 2010 |
| 2010 | Katarina Akridge | Woodbury | 16 | - | Bollywood Jazz Dance, "Jai Ho" | | | |
| 2009 | Katlyn Ziegler | Coon Rapids | 15 | - | Piano | | | |
| 2008 | Alyssa Mayfield | Frazee | 16 | Miss Frazee Teen | Dance | | | |
| 2007 | Chantal Wilson | Greenbush | 16 | | Piano | | Academic Achievement Award | 1st runner-up at Miss Minnesota 2014 pageant |
| 2006 | Natalie Davis | Dassel | | - | Vocal | | Academic Achievement Award | Contestant at National Sweetheart 2009 pageant Later Miss Minnesota 2011 |
| 2005 | Giselle Marie Ugarte | Minnetonka | 16 | - | Jazz Dance | | | Later Miss Teen Minnesota International 2007 4th runner-up at Miss Minnesota Teen USA 2007 pageant |
