= Miss New Mexico's Teen =

- Formation: 2005
- Type: Beauty Pageant
- Location: Alamogordo, New Mexico
- Members: Miss America's Teen
- Official language: English
- Key people: Rhonda Haynes
- Website: Official website

For the state pageant affiliated with Miss Teen USA, see Miss New Mexico Teen USA

The Miss New Mexico's Teen competition is the pageant that selects the representative for the U.S. state of New Mexico in the Miss America's Teen pageant.

Jordyn Champion of Las Cruces was crowned Miss New Mexico's Teen on June 13, 2026, at the Flickinger Center for Performing Arts in Alamogordo, New Mexico. She competed for the title of Miss America's Teen 2027 on September 5, 2026, at the Kravis Center for the Performing Arts in West Palm Beach, Florida.

== Results summary ==
The year in parentheses indicates year of Miss America's Outstanding Teen competition the award/placement was garnered.

=== Placements ===
- Top 12: Natalie Benson (2013)

=== Awards ===
- America's Choice: Natalie Benson (2013)
- Teens in Action Award Finalists: Natalie Benson (2013)

== Winners ==
- Declared as winner
- Ended as a runner-up
- Ended as a finalist or semi-finalist

Year	Name	Hometown	Age	Local Title	Talent	Placement at MAO Teen	Special scholarships at MAO Teen	Notes
2026	Jordyn Campion	Las Cruces	17	Miss Land of Enchanment's Teen	HERStory			Previously Miss Teen Earth USA 2025
2025	Tinaya St. ClassisBrown	Albuquerque	16	Miss Bernalillo County's Teen	Vocal			
2024	Grace Evans	Hobbs	18	Miss Lea County's Teen	Lyrical Dance			
2023	Emily Lehr	Alamogordo	18	Miss Otero County's Teen	Jazz Dance			Previously Miss New Mexico Teen USA 2021
2022	Morgan Buhler	Alamogordo		Miss Alamogordo's Outstanding Teen	Jazz Dance			
2021	Dallas Collins	Alamogordo	18	Miss Cloudcroft's Outstanding Teen	Vocal, "What About Us"			
2019–20	Brynn Ayala	Albuquerque	15	Miss Albuquerque's Outstanding Teen	Jazz Dance, "A Little Party Never Killed Nobody" by Fergie			
2018	Abrianna Morales	Las Cruces	16	Miss Las Cruces' Outstanding Teen	Vocal, "All That Matters"			
2017	Sienna Mascarenas	Albuquerque	16	Miss Rio Grande's Outstanding Teen	Jazz Dance, "Breath of Life"			Later Miss New Mexico 2021; Later Miss New Mexico Volunteer 2025
2016	Madison Belcher	Texico	16	Miss Portales' Outstanding Teen	Piano, “Puttin’ on the Ritz”			
2015	Sasha Butcher	Albuquerque	15	Miss Las Vegas' Outstanding Teen	Vocal			
2014	Lindsey Day	Carlsbad	14	Miss Enchanted Forest's Outstanding Teen				
2013	Jaden Smith	Roswell	14	Miss Chavez County's Outstanding Teen	Tap Dance			
2012	Natalie Benson	Albuquerque	15	Miss Route 66's Outstanding Teen	Piano	Top 12	America's Choice Teens in Action Award Finalist	Later Distinguished Young Woman of New Mexico 2015
2011	Nicolette Young	Las Cruces	15	Miss Las Cruces' Outstanding Teen				Later Distinguished Young Woman of New Mexico 2014
2010	Nadine Sanchez	Los Alamos	16		Piano, "Moonlight Sonata" by Ludwig van Beethoven			
2009	Ashley Fresquez	Rio Rancho	14		Ballet			Later Miss New Mexico 2018
2008	Alyssa Jean Sifuentes	Silver City			Vocal/Guitar			
2007	Madison Tabet	Albuquerque	15		Dance			Later Miss New Mexico 2010
2006	Ellen Striepeke	Silver City			Tap Dance			
2005	Sara Elizabeth Ryan	Roswell	16		Tap Dance			
