= Miss America's Outstanding Teen 2013 =

Beauty pageant edition

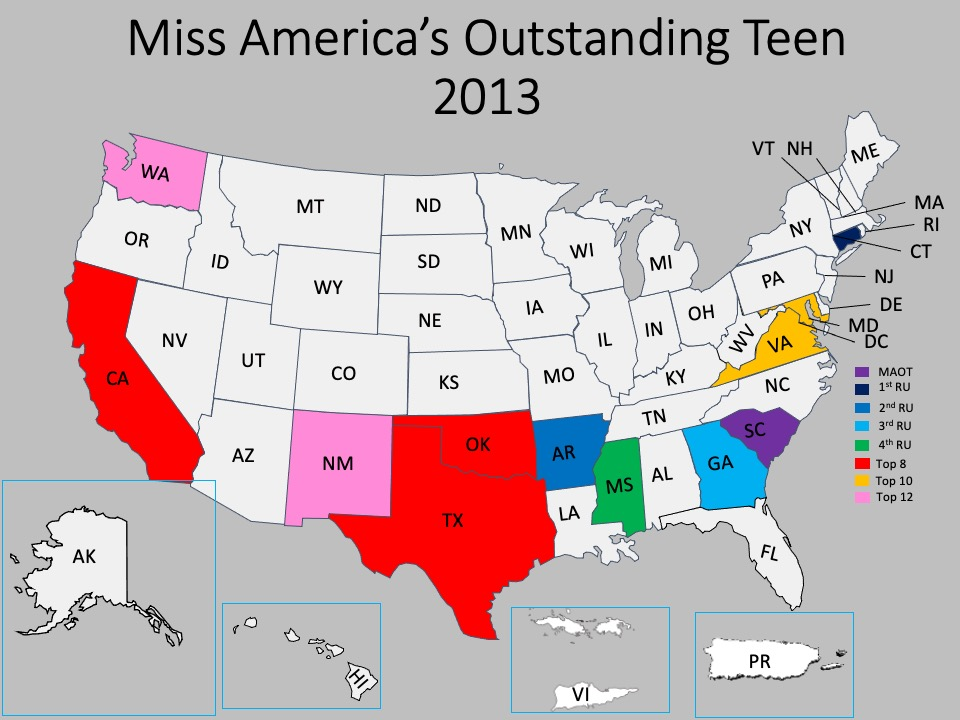
- Miss America's Outstanding Teen 2013 Participants and Results
- Date: August 18, 2012
- Presenters: Laura Kaeppeler
- Venue: Linda Chapin Theater, Orange County Convention Center, Orlando, Florida, United States
- Entrants: 53
- Placements: 12
- Winner: Rachel Wyatt; South Carolina

Miss America's Outstanding Teen 2013 was the Eighth Miss America's Outstanding Teen pageant, held at the Linda Chapin Theater in the Orange County Convention Center in Orlando, Florida, United States, on August 18, 2012.

At the conclusion of the event, Elizabeth Fechtel of Florida crowned her successor Rachel Wyatt of South Carolina. Miss America 2012 Laura Kaeppeler was a host of the event.

== Results ==
=== Placements ===
Placement	Contestant
Miss America's Outstanding Teen 2013	South Carolina – Rachel Wyatt
1st Runner-Up	Connecticut – Jainé Coann Truex LeFebvre
2nd Runner-Up	Arkansas – Laura Leigh Turner
3rd Runner-Up	Georgia – Jameson Kenerly
4th Runner-Up	Mississippi – Molly May
Top 8	California – Grace Grant; Oklahoma – Julianne Thomison; Texas – Margana Wood
Top 10	Maryland – Kennedy Taylor; Virginia – Andolyn Medina
Top 12	New Mexico – Natalie Benson; Washington – Janae Calaway

=== Awards ===
==== Preliminary Awards ====
Awards	Contestant(s)
Evening Wear/On-Stage Question	Connecticut - Jainé Coann Truex LeFebvre; Utah - Jessica Richards; Virginia - Andolyn Medina
Talent	Arkansas - Laura Leigh Turner; (Georgia (U.S. state)) Georgia - Jameson Kenerly; Mississippi - Molly May; Utah - Jessica Richards

==== Non-finalist Awards ====
Awards	Contestant(s)
Evening Wear/On-Stage Question	Utah - Jessica Richards
Interview	Tennessee - Haley Butler
Talent	Kentucky - Lauren Bohl; Utah - Jessica Richards

==== Top 5 Interviews ====
Award	Contestants
Top 5 in Interview	Connecticut - Jainé Coann Truex LeFebvre
Top 5 in Interview	Indiana - Brooke Campbell
Top 5 in Interview	Rhode Island - Alexandra Coppa
Top 5 in Interview	South Carolina - Rachel Wyatt
Top 5 in Interview	Tennessee - Haley Butler

==== Other Awards ====
Award	Contestant(s)
Advertising Award	(Georgia (U.S. state)) Georgia - Jameson Kenerly; Texas - Margana Wood; (Washington (state)) Washington - Janae Calaway
America's Choice Award	New Mexico - Natalie Benson; (Washington (state)) Washington - Janae Calaway
Community Service Award	West Virginia - Morgan Breeden
Outstanding Achievement in Academic Life Award	(Georgia (U.S. state)) Georgia - Jameson Kenerly
Outstanding Instrumental Talent	Kentucky - Lauren Bohl; Utah - Jessica Richards
Photogenic Award	Wyoming - Jessica Caitlyn Power
Scholastic Excellence Award	Colorado - Molly Casey
Spirit of America Award	(New York (state)) New York - Shannon Ryan
Teens in Action	Winner: Virginia - Andolyn Medina; Finalists: Nevada - Ellie Smith; New Mexico - Natalie Benson

== Contestants ==
State	Name	Hometown	Age	Local Title	Talent	Placement at MAO Teen	Special Scholarships at MAO Teen	Notes
Alabama	Callie Regan Walker	Birmingham	14	Miss Point Mallard's Outstanding Teen	Ballet en Pointe, "Storms in Africa"			Daughter of Angela Tower Walker, Miss Alabama 1985 Sister of Scarlett Walker, Miss Alabama's Outstanding Teen 2010 Later Miss Alabama 2018 Top 10 at Miss America 2019
Alaska	Jordan Brielle Naylor	Anchorage	14	Miss Forget-Me-Not's Outstanding Teen	Dramatic Monologue from The Wizard of Oz			Contestant at National Sweetheart 2017 1st runner-up at Miss Alaska 2018
Arizona	Madison Esteves	Chandler	17	Miss Maricopa County's Outstanding Teen	Dance			Later Miss Arizona 2015
Arkansas	Laura Leigh Turner	Little Rock	15	Miss Diamond Lakes' Outstanding Teen	Tap Dance, "Beat It"	2nd runner-up	Preliminary Talent Award	1st runner-up at Miss Arkansas 2018 and 2019
California	Grace Grant	San Francisco	17	Miss Golden Gate's Outstanding Teen	Ballet	Top 8		
Colorado	Molly Casey						Scholastic Excellence Award	
Connecticut	Jainé Coann Truex LeFebvre	Glastonbury	16	Miss Mountain Laurel's Outstanding Teen	Vocal	1st runner-up	Preliminary Evening Wear/OSQ Award Top 5 Interview Top 10 Community Service	
Delaware	Morgan Burris	Middletown	16	Miss Wilmington's Outstanding Teen	Vocal			
(Washington, D.C.) District of Columbia	Cate Dillon	Washington D.C.	17		Vocal, "In My Own Little Corner" from Cinderella (Rodgers and Hammerstein version)			
Florida	Jennifer Stehlin	Jacksonville	17	Miss St. Johns County's Outstanding Teen	Mambo, "The 20th Century-Fox Mambo" from Smash			
(Georgia (U.S. state)) Georgia	Jameson Kenerly	Jesup	17	Miss Capital City's Outstanding Teen	Lyrical Twirl/Dance, "Once Upon a December" by Liz Callaway, from the 1997 film Anastasia	3rd runner-up	Advertising Award Outstanding Achievement in Academic Life Award Preliminary Talent Award	Sister of Adeline Kenerly, Miss Georgia 2015
Hawaii	Hulali Brown	Maui			Hula			
Idaho	Ashley Southern	Boise	17	Miss Ada County's Outstanding Teen				Contestant at National Sweetheart 2016
Illinois	Grace Khachaturian	Champaign	15	Miss Central Illinois' Outstanding Teen	Dance			Later Miss Illinois 2018
Indiana	Brooke Campbell	Avilla	16	Miss Limberlost's Outstanding Teen	Tap Dance, "When I Get My Name In Lights" from The Boy from Oz		Top 5 Interview	
Iowa	Savannah Necker	DeWitt	15	Miss Clinton County's Outstanding Teen	Baton Twirl, "The Cup of Life" by Ricky Martin			
Kansas	Stevie Ann Mack	Wichita	16	Miss Heartland's Outstanding Teen	Musical Theater Dance, "I Want to Be a Rockette" by Debbie Gravitte			
Kentucky	Lauren Bohl	Barbourville	16	Miss Cumberland Falls' Outstanding Teen	Piano, "Piano Fantasy" by William Joseph		Non-finalist Talent Award Outstanding Instrumental Talent Award	
Louisiana	Deon Sumer	Zachary	17	Miss Acadiana's Outstanding Teen	Baton Twirl, "Rockin' Robin" by Bobby Day			
Maine	Katie Elliot	Scarborough	17		Vocal			Later Miss Maine 2017
Maryland	Kennedy Taylor	Silver Spring	15	Miss University City's Outstanding Teen	Ballroom Salsa Dance	Top 10		Duke of Edinburgh Bronze Medalist
Massachusetts	Amy de Silva	Dartmouth	16	Miss New Bedford's Outstanding Teen	Vocal, "Let It Be" by The Beatles			Suffers from Charcot-Marie-Tooth disease
Michigan	Sabrina Jeffrey	Bay City	14	Miss Saginaw County's Outstanding Teen	Character Dance, "All for You" from Seussical			
Minnesota	Bailey Wachholz	Nisswa	16	Miss Brainerd Lakes' Outstanding Teen	Piano, "Fur Elise" by Ludwig van Beethoven			
Mississippi	Molly May	Houston	17	Miss Dixie's Outstanding Teen	Vocal, "And I Am Telling You" from Dreamgirls	4th runner-up	Preliminary Talent Award	2nd runner-up at Miss Mississippi 2016
Missouri	Shelby Steingraeber	St. Charles	17	Miss St. Charles' Outstanding Teen	Vocal, "One Rock & Roll Too Many" from Starlight Express			2nd runner-up at Miss Missouri 2017
Montana	Moira Shea							
Nebraska	Lianna Prill	Holdrege	17	Miss Sandhills' Outstanding Teen	Vocal, "I'm Alive" by Celine Dion			2nd runner-up at Miss Nebraska 2016 3rd runner-up at Miss Nebraska 2017
Nevada	Ellie Smith	Henderson					Teens in Action Finalist	Older sister of Amy Smith, Miss Nevada's Outstanding Teen 2014 Later Miss Nevada 2014
New Hampshire	Eileen Kelley	Randolph	17	Miss Stafford County's Outstanding Teen	Vocal, "Part of Your World" from The Little Mermaid			
New Jersey	Amanda Ross	Galloway	16	Miss South Shore Area's Outstanding Teen	Ballet en Pointe			3rd runner-up at Miss New Jersey 2016 2nd runner-up at Miss New Jersey 2017 and 2018
New Mexico	Natalie Benson	Albuquerque	15	Miss Route 66's Outstanding Teen		Top 12	America's Choice Teens in Action Finalist	
(New York (state)) New York	Shannon Ryan	Clifton Park		Miss Empire Rose's Outstanding Teen			Spirit of America Award	
North Carolina	Alexandra Badgett	Reidsville	15	Miss Lake Norman's Outstanding Teen	Tap Dance, "It's Sand, Man!" by Count Basie and His Orchestra			4th runner-up at Miss South Carolina 2018
North Dakota	Kaylee Seven	Williston	15	Miss Oil Country's Outstanding Teen	Vocal, “I Can Hear the Bells” from Hairspray			
Ohio	Sarah Elizabeth Eash	Lakewood	17	Miss Cuyahoga County's Outstanding Teen	Dance			
Oklahoma	Julianne Thomison	Tulsa	14	Miss Tulsa's Outstanding Teen	Dance, "Mein Herr" from Cabaret	Top 8		3rd runner-up at Miss Oklahoma 2016 and 2018 2nd runner-up at Miss Oklahoma 2017
Oregon	Marli Martin	Central Point	14	Miss Jackson County's Outstanding Teen	Vocal			
Pennsylvania	Kaitlyn Miller	Plymouth	17	Miss MidState's Outstanding Teen	Tap Dance			
Puerto Rico	Dayaneira Figueroa Ballester	Mayaguez	15	Miss Mayaguez's Outstanding Teen	Dance, "Reflection" from Mulan			
Rhode Island	Alexandra Coppa	Cranston	16		Dance, "Sway" by Michael Buble		Top 5 Interview	Later Miss Rhode Island 2018
South Carolina	Rachel Wyatt	Piedmont	17	Miss Greater Maulden Teen	Dance, "The Climb" by Miley Cyrus	Winner	Top 5 Interview	Later Miss South Carolina 2016 1st runner-up at Miss America 2017
South Dakota	Meridith Gould	Sioux Falls	17	Miss Siouxlands' Outstanding Teen	Ballet en Pointe			Later Miss South Dakota 2014 Later Miss Minnesota USA 2017 2nd runner-up at Miss USA 2017
Tennessee	Haley Butler	Nashville	17	Miss Shelby County's Outstanding Teen	Fiddle, "The Devil Went Down To Georgia" by Charlie Daniels		Non-finalist Interview Award Top 5 Interview	Featured on 2011 documentary, Somewhere Between
Texas	Margana Wood	Houston	17	Miss Houston's Outstanding Teen	Dance	Top 8	Advertising Award	Later Miss Texas 2017 4th runner-up at Miss America 2018
Utah	Jessica Richards	Sandy	16	Miss Draper's Outstanding Teen	Piano		Non-finalist Evening Wear/OSQ Award Non-finalist Talent Award Preliminary Evening Wear/OSQ Award Preliminary Talent Award Outstanding Instrumental Talent Award	Daughter of Miss Utah USA 1986, Stephanie Reber Richards
Vermont	Caroline Jones	Shelburne	16		Theatrical Fending Demonstration, "Youth, Joy, and Freedom" from Peter Pan			
Virginia	Andolyn Medina	Chesapeake	16	Miss Arlington's Outstanding Teen	Classical Vocal	Top 10	Preliminary Evening Wear/OSQ Award Teens in Action Award	Top 10 at Miss Virginia 2017 & 2018 Later District of Columbia Sweetheart 2019 3rd runner up at National Sweetheart 2019 Later Miss District of Columbia 2021
(United States Virgin Islands) Virgin Islands	Allayeah John-Baptiste	Saint Croix	16		Ballet en Pointe			
(Washington (state)) Washington	Janae Calaway	Kennewick	17	Miss Tri-Cities' Outstanding Teen	Jazz Dance	Top 12	Advertising Award America's Choice	
West Virginia	Morgan Breeden	Summit Point	17	Miss Shenandoah's Outstanding Teen	Piano		Community Service Award	Later Miss West Virginia 2016
Wisconsin	Madeline Morgan	Oregon	16	Miss West Allis' Outstanding Teen	Piano, "She Sings"			
Wyoming	Jessica Caitlyn Power	Cody	15	Miss Cody's Outstanding Teen	Tap Dance, "Hot Wings" by Will.I.am. From Rio		Miss Photogenic	
