= Miss Tennessee's Teen =

- Formation: 2004
- Type: Scholarship Competition
- Location: Jackson, Tennessee
- Members: Miss America's Teen
- Official language: English
- Key people: Colene Trent (State Executive Director)
- Website: Official website

The Miss Tennessee's Teen competition is the competition that selects the representative for the U.S. state of Tennessee in the Miss America's Teen pageant.

Charlotte Witt of Nashville was crowned Miss Tennessee's Teen on June 20, 2026, at the Fisher Center for the Performing Arts at Belmont University in Nashville, Tennessee. She competed for the title of Miss America's Teen 2027 on September 5, 2026, at the Kravis Center for the Performing Arts in West Palm Beach, Florida.

== Results summary ==
The results of Miss Tennessee's Outstanding Teen as they participated in the national Miss America's Outstanding Teen competition. The year in parentheses indicates the year of the Miss America's Outstanding Teen competition the award/placement was garnered.

=== Placements ===
- 1st runners-up: Lexie Perry (2015)
- 3rd runners-up: Leah Beth Bolton (2007), Taylor Parsons (2020)
- Top 10: Madeline Littrell (2006)
- Top 11: Anna Grace Parlapiano (2024)

=== Awards ===
==== Preliminary awards ====
- Preliminary Lifestyle & Fitness: Leah Beth Bolton (2007), Devin Grissom (2008)
- Preliminary Talent: Lexie Perry (2015), Taylor Parsons (2020)

==== Non-finalist awards ====
- Non-finalist Interview: Haley Butler (2013)

==== Other awards ====
- Outstanding Instrumental Talent Award: Lexie Perry (2015)
- Overall Dance Talent: Taylor Parsons (2020)
- Teens in Action Award Finalists: Mary Humphrey (2018)

== Winners ==
- Declared as Winner
- Ended as a runner-up
- Ended as a finalist or semi-finalist

Year	Name	Hometown	Age	Local title	Talent	Placement at MAO Teen	Special scholarships at MAO Teen	Notes
2026	Charlotte Witt	Nashville	18	Miss Nashville’s Teen	Jazz Dance			
2025	Analee Shaver	Collierville	16	Miss Memphis' Teen	Dance			
2024	Leela Kate Beaty	McMinnville	18	Miss Central Tennessee's Teen	Contemporary Dance			
2023	Anna Grace Parlapiano	Greeneville	18	Miss Nashville's Teen	Dance	Top 11		
2022	Jane Marie Franks	Clifton	16	Miss Lexington's Outstanding Teen	Vocal, "Piece of Sky" by Barbra Streisand			
2021	Taylor Black	Gallatin	18	Miss Sumner County's Outstanding Teen	Vocal, "At Last" by Etta James			First African American crowned Miss Tennessee's Outstanding Teen
2019–20 (Note: Titleholder extended to another full year in 2020 after state and national pageants postponed due to the COVID-19 pandemic.)	Taylor Parsons	Mountain City	16	Miss Mountain Empire's Outstanding Teen	Clogging, "The Devil Went Down to Georgia"	3rd runner-up	Overall Dance Talent Award Preliminary Talent Award	Top 12 at Miss Tennessee 2022 Miss Lexington 2023
2018	Mary Humphrey	McMinnville	15	Miss Jackson's Outstanding Teen	Jazz en Pointe, "Ease on Down the Road" from The Wiz		Teens in Action Award Finalist	Later Distinguished Young Woman of Tennessee 2020 2nd runner-up at Miss Tennessee Teen USA 2021
2017	Autumn Arsenault	Knoxville	16	Miss Greater Greenville's Outstanding Teen	Violin, "The Phantom of the Opera" arranged by Lindsey Stirling			
2016	Leah Grace Humble	Sevier County	16	Miss Music City's Outstanding Teen	Tap, "Great Balls of Fire"			Later Distinguished Young Woman of Tennessee 2018 Top 12 at Miss Alabama 2021 Miss Tuscaloosa 2022
2015	Allie Privitt	Humboldt	16	Miss Henderson County's Outstanding Teen	Acro-Jazz Lyrical Dance			
2014	Lexie Perry	Dresden	17	Miss Jackson's Outstanding Teen	Fiddle, "Devil Went Down to Georgia"/"Orange Blossom Special"	1st runner-up	Outstanding Instrumental Talent Award Preliminary Talent Award	
2013	Chandler Booth	Collierville		Miss Collierville's Outstanding Teen	Vocal, "I Will Always Love You"			Appeared on America's Got Talent with her high school a cappella group, OneVoice
2012	Haley Butler	Nashville	17	Miss Shelby County's Outstanding Teen	Fiddle		Non-finalist Interview Award Top 5 Interview Award	Featured on 2011 documentary, Somewhere Between
2011	Madison Snipes		16	Miss Tennessee Valley's Outstanding Teen	Tap Dance			
2010	Maggie Belew	Lexington	17	Miss Henderson County's Outstanding Teen	Baton/Twirl			
2009	Victoria Calton	Brentwood		Miss Nashville's Outstanding Teen				
2008	Madyson Foster	Cleveland	16	Miss Scenic City's Outstanding Teen	Dance			
2007	Devin Grissom	Cordova	16	Miss Cordova's Outstanding Teen	Vocal		Preliminary Lifestyle & Fitness Award	Appeared on season 1 of CMT's Sweet Home Alabama 2nd runner-up at the Miss Tennessee Teen USA 2009 pageant 1st runner-up at the Miss Alabama USA 2013 pageant 3rd runner-up at the Miss Tennessee USA 2014 pageant 3rd runner-up at the Miss Tennessee USA 2015 pageant
2006	Leah Beth Bolton	Jackson			Tap Dance	3rd runner-up	Preliminary Lifestyle & Fitness Award	Later 2nd runner-up at the Miss Tennessee Teen USA 2008
2005	Madeline Littrell	Germantown	16	At-Large	Vocal, “If I Can Dream”	Top 10		
2004	Elizabeth Wood					No national pageant		
