= Miss District of Columbia's Teen =

- Formation: 2005
- Type: Beauty pageant
- Headquarters: Washington, D.C.
- Location: District of Columbia
- Members: Miss America's Teen
- Official language: English
- Website: Official website

The Miss District of Columbia's Teen competition is the pageant that selects a representative from District of Columbia for the Miss America's Outstanding Teen pageant.

Salincya Archard of Washington, D.C. was crowned Miss District of Columbia's Teen on June 27, 2026, at the UDC Theater of the Arts in Washington, D.C. She competed for the title of Miss America's Teen 2027 on September 5, 2026, at the Kravis Center for the Performing Arts in West Palm Beach, Florida.

== Results summary ==
The following is a visual summary of the results present in table seen below. The year in parentheses indicates year of Miss America's Outstanding Teen competition the award/placement was garnered.

=== Placements ===
- 1st runners-up: Lauren Williams (2023)
- 4th runners-up: Ashton Blake Hart (2026)
- Top 10: Jasmine Alexis (2009)

=== Awards ===
==== Preliminary awards ====
- Preliminary Evening Wear/On-Stage Question: Hope Wiseman (2010)

==== Non-finalist awards ====
- Non-finalist Evening Wear/On-Stage Question: Hope Wiseman (2010)
- Non-finalist Interview: Hope Wiseman (2010)

== Winners ==
- Declared as winner
- Ended as a runner-up
- Ended as a finalist or semi-finalist

Year	Name	Hometown	Age	Talent	Placement at MAO Teen	Special scholarships at MAO Teen	Notes
2026	Salincya Archard	Washington, D.C.	17	Spoken Word			
2025	Blake Hart	Meridian, MS	17	Piano	4th runner-up		Later Miss District of Columbia Teen USA 2026
2024	Did not send representative to national competition						
2023	Tiarah Williams	Washington, D.C.					
2022	Lauren Williams		Original Spoken Word	1st runner-up			
2021	Jade Ridout	Washington, D.C.	16	Monologue, "Hey Queen"			
2019-20	Kianna Kelly-Futch	Washington, D.C.	17	Vocal, "Home" from The Wiz			
2018	Natalie Beckford	Washington, D.C.	15	Classical Ballet			
2017	Brooke Miller		15	Vocal			
2016	Nilah Pettus	Washington, D.C.	16	Dance			
2015	Jade Allysee Parchment	Washington, D.C.	15	Drums			
2014	Cydney Hill	Washington, D.C.		Dance			
2013	Logan White	Alexandria	16	Vocal			
2012	Cate Dillon	Washington, D.C.	17	Vocal			
2011	Lauren Seely	Washington, D.C.	17				
2010	Julia Braxton	Washington, D.C.	16	Vocal			4th runner-up at Miss Virginia 2017 pageant
2009	Hope Wiseman	Washington, D.C.	17	Dance, "Bring Me Flowers"		Non-finalist Interview Award Non-finalist Evening Wear/OSQ Award Preliminary Evening Wear/OSQ Award	In 2017, was named the youngest African American cannabis dispensary owner in the US
2008	Jasmine Alexis	Washington, D.C.	17	Latin Ballroom Dance, "Hip Hip, Chin Chin"	Top 10		Previously Miss District of Columbia Teen USA 2007 Later was the inaugural Miss Black USA Talented Teen, crowned in 2009
2007	LaTonya Abrams	Washington, D.C.					
2006	Elizabeth Ann Payne	Washington, D.C.		Operatic Vocal			
2005	Virginia Ryan	Washington, D.C.	17	Vocal			
