= Miss Illinois' Teen =

- Formation: 2005
- Type: Beauty pageant
- Location: Marion, Illinois
- Members: Miss America's Teen
- Official language: English
- Key people: Dr. Susan Shea (Executive Director)
- Website: Official website

For the state pageant affiliated with Miss Teen USA, see Miss Illinois Teen USA

The Miss Illinois' Teen competition is the pageant that selects the representative for the U.S. state of Illinois in the Miss America's Teen pageant.

Brooke Herod of Gurnee was crowned Miss Illinois' Teen on June 12, 2026, at the Marion Cultural and Civic Center in Marion, Illinois. She competed for the title of Miss America's Teen 2027 on September 5, 2026, at the Kravis Center for the Performing Arts in West Palm Beach, Florida.

In January 2023, the official name of the pageant was changed from Miss Illinois’ Outstanding Teen, to Miss Illinois’ Teen, in accordance with the national pageant.

== Results summary ==
The year in parentheses indicated year of Miss America's Outstanding Teen competition the award/placement was garnered.

=== Awards ===
==== Preliminary awards ====
- Preliminary Talent: MerrieBeth Cox (2008)
- Preliminary Evening Wear/On-Stage Question: MerrieBeth Cox (2008), Summer Robbins (2012)

==== Non-finalist awards ====
- Non-finalist Evening Wear/OSQ: Peyton Newman (2019)
- Non-finalist Interview: Summer Robbins (2011), Imani P. Muse (2020)

Other awards

- AHA Go Red For Women Leadership Award: Lucy Kuelper (2025)

== Winners ==
Year	Name	Hometown	Age	Local title	Talent	Placement at MAO Teen	Special scholarships at MAO Teen	Notes
2026	Brooke Herod	Gurnee	16	Miss Capital City's Teen	Hip-Hop Dance			
2025	Lillie Brown	Jacksonville	16	Miss Bay City's Teen	Lyrical Dance			
2024	Lucy Kuepler	Rio	16	Miss Capital City's Teen	Vocal		AHA Go Red for Women Leadership Award	Later Miss Illinois Teen Volunteer 2026
2023	Isabella Waggoner	Ramsey	17	Miss Capital City's Teen	Violin			Miss Southern Illinois 2026
2022	Mia Fritsch-Anderson	Chicago	17	Miss Chicago's Outstanding Teen	Irish Dance			
2021	Kylie Ryder	Sycamore	18	Miss Windy City's Outstanding Teen	Lyrical Dance, "Who You Are"			3rd Runner Up at Miss Illinois 2025. Miss Northern Suburbs 2026.
2020	Victoria Shore	Marion	18	Miss Land of Lincoln's Outstanding Teen 2019	Vocal	N/A		Assumed title when Imani Muse stepped down after a year of service. Later became Miss Missouri Volunteer 2022.
2019	Imani P. Muse	Illinois City	16	Miss Chicago's Outstanding Teen	Vocal, "The Impossible Dream" from Man of La Mancha		Non-finalist Interview Award	First African-American to be named Miss Illinois' Outstanding Teen. Top 13 at Miss Alabama 2024. Competed at Miss Alabama 2025. Miss Mississippi Crown 2026.
2018	Peyton Newman	Vernon Hills	16	Miss Chicago's Outstanding Teen	Vocal, "Vienna"		Non-finalist Evening Wear/OSQ Award	
2017	Maddie Mazzella	Chicago	17	Miss Chicago's Outstanding Teen	Vocal “On my Way”			
2016	Christine Bryant	Marion	17	Miss Southern Illinois' Outstanding Teen	Vocal, “Hallelujah”			
2015	Peyton Tucker	Moline	17	Miss Windy City's Outstanding Teen	Vocal			
2014	Grace Etzkorn	Lisle	17	Miss Windy City's Outstanding Teen	Vocal			Competed at the Jimmy Awards in 2015 2nd runner-up at Miss Illinois 2018 pageant
2013	Isabelle Hanson	Glen Ellyn	17	Miss Northern Suburbs' Outstanding Teen	Violin		Dr. Glenn Harman Instrumental Talent Award	Later Miss Illinois 2021, Miss America 2022 Top 10 Finalist, Miss America 2022 Talent Preliminary Award Winner
2012	Grace Khachaturian	Champaign	15	Miss Central Illinois' Outstanding Teen	Dance			Later Miss Illinois 2018
2011	Summer Robbins	Coffeen	16	Miss Southern Illinois' Outstanding Teen	Violin, "Classical Gas"		Non-finalist Interview Award Preliminary Evening Wear/OSQ Award	
2010	Kaitlyn Wehr	Moline	16	Miss Blackhawk Valley's Outstanding Teen	Jazz Dance			
2009	Andrea Novak	Arlington Heights	17	Miss Dupage County's Outstanding Teen	Dance/Twirl			
2008	Emily Travis	Metropolis	17	Miss Metropolis' Outstanding Teen	Piano			Diagnosed with fetal alcohol syndrome as an infant
2007	MerrieBeth Cox	Roselle	16	Miss Greater Woodfield's Outstanding Teen	Baton Twirling		Preliminary Evening Wear/OSQ Award Preliminary Talent Award	Later Purdue University's 27th Golden Girl Later Miss Indiana 2012; Top 12 at Miss America 2013 pageant
2006	Campbell Hunt	Marion		Miss John A. Logan's Outstanding Teen	Vocal with American Sign Language interpretation, "The Rose"			
2005	Kathryn Strause	Rock Island	17	Miss Blackhawk Valley's Outstanding Teen	Classical Piano			
