= Miss Idaho's Teen =

- Formation: 2005
- Type: Scholarship pageant
- Location: Idaho Falls
- Members: Miss America's Teen
- Official language: English
- Key people: Heidi Kennedy
- Website: Official website

The Miss Idaho's Teen competition is the pageant that selects the representative of the U.S. state of Idaho in Miss America's Teen pageant.

Lilly Murdock of Rigby was crowned Miss Idaho's Teen on June 13, 2026, at the Colonial Theater in Idaho Falls, Idaho. She competed for the title of Miss America's Teen 2027 on September 5, 2026, at the Kravis Center for the Performing Arts in West Palm Beach, Florida.

In January 2023, the official name of the pageant was changed from Miss Idaho’s Outstanding Teen, to Miss Idaho’s Teen, in accordance with the national pageant.

== Results summary ==
The year in parentheses indicates year of Miss America's Outstanding Teen the award/placement was garnered.

=== Placements ===
- Top 11: Mady Thornquest (2017)
- Top 15: Kaila Yacuk (2020)

=== Awards ===
==== Preliminary awards ====
- Preliminary Evening Wear/On-Stage Question: Mady Thornquest (2017)

==== Non-finalist awards ====
- Non-finalist Interview: Ava Powell (2018)

==== Other awards ====
- America's Choice: Kaila Yacuk (2020)
- Outstanding Achievement in Academic Life: Katy Lootens (2011)

== Winners ==
- Declared as winner
- Ended as a runner-up
- Ended as a finalist or semi-finalist

Year	Name	Hometown	Age	Local title	Talent	Placement at MAO Teen	Special scholarships at MAO Teen	Notes
2026	Lilly Murdock	Rigby	17	Miss Jefferson's Teen	Ballroom Dance			
2025	Kirra McCarty	Idaho Falls	18	Miss Idaho Falls' Teen	Lyrical Dance			
2024	BrekLynn Pancheri	Nampa	16	Miss Canyon Valley's Teen	Lyrical Dance			
2023	Ellie Harris	Roberts	16	Miss Southeast Idaho's Teen	Lyrical Dance			Later Miss Southeast Idaho 2026
2022	Reagan Eubanks	Idaho Falls	18	Miss Pocatello's Outstanding Teen	Piano			
2021	Madison Andreason	Idaho Falls	18	Miss Meridian's Outstanding Teen	Vocal, "Rise Up"			Later Miss Idaho 2024. Daughter of Vicki Hoffman Andreason, Miss Idaho USA 1987.
2019-20	Kaila Yacuk	Eagle	17	Miss Meridian's Outstanding Teen	Contemporary Dance, "Anything's Possible"	Top 15	America's Choice	
2018	Chloe Shelton	Boise	17	Miss Star Garnet's Outstanding Teen	Jazz Dance			Received the title after the re-tabulated scores were finalized. Later Miss Idaho Volunteer 2022. Miss Pride of the North (ND) 2023.
2018	Kaila Yacuk	Eagle	16	Miss Capitol City's Outstanding Teen	Dance	N/A		Gave up title after a judge's eligibility was questioned and the organization re-tabulated scores
2017	Ava Powell	Emmett	16	Miss Treasure Valley's Outstanding Teen			Non-finalist Interview Award	
2016	Mady Thornquest	Twin Falls	15	Miss Magic Valley's Outstanding Teen	Classical Ballet	Top 11	Preliminary Evening Wear/OSQ Award	
2015	Abigail Kunz	Rigby	16	Miss Southeastern Idaho's Outstanding Teen	Vocal			Later Distinguished Young Woman of Idaho 2017
2014	Heidi Olsen	Melba		Miss Gate City's Outstanding Teen	Operatic Vocal			
2013	Abby Bitzenburg	Twin Falls	15	Miss Tri-Counties' Outstanding Teen	Clogging			
2012	Ashley Southern	Boise	17	Miss Ada County's Outstanding Teen	Lyrical Ballet en Pointe			1st runner-up at Miss Idaho Teen USA 2011 pageant 3rd runner-up at Miss Idaho USA 2016 pageant Contestant at National Sweetheart 2016 pageant
2011	Melanie Ross	Idaho Falls	17	At-Large	Piano			
2010	Katy Lootens	Marsing	17	At-Large			Outstanding Achievement in Academic Life Award	
2009	Carley Campbell	Meridian	17	At-Large	Vocal			
2008	Danielle Beckstrom	Eagle	17	At-Large	Vocal			
2007	Cassidy Bronson	Ammon	14		Vocal			
2006	Genevieve Nutting	Boise	17	At-Large	Classical Piano			Later Miss Idaho 2011
2005	Amanda Workman	American Falls	17		Ballet/Hip Hop Dance			
