= Miss Oregon's Teen =

Beauty Pageant in Oregon

- Formation: 2003
- Type: Beauty pageant
- Location: Seaside, Oregon
- Members: Miss America's Teen
- Official language: English
- Key people: Stephenie Steers
- Website: Official website

The Miss Oregon's Teen competition is the pageant that selects the representative for the U.S. state of Oregon in the Miss America's Teen pageant.

Aria Christensen of Eugene was crowned Miss Oregon's Teen on June 27, 2026, at the Seaside Convention Center in Seaside, Oregon. She competed for the title of Miss America's Teen 2027 on September 5, 2026, at the Kravis Center for the Performing Arts in West Palm Beach, Florida.

== Results summary ==
The following is a visual summary of the past results of Miss Oregon's Outstanding Teen titleholders presented in the table below. The year in parentheses indicates year of the Miss America's Outstanding Teen competition in which the placement and/or award was garnered.

=== Placements ===
- Top 11: Mila Pearl (2026), Aria Christensen (2027)

=== Awards ===
==== Preliminary awards ====
- Preliminary Talent: Aria Christensen (2027)
- Preliminary Fitness: Aria Christensen (2027)
- Preliminary Evening Wear/On-Stage Question: Emma Ellis (2017)

==== Non-finalist awards ====
- Non-finalist Evening Wear/On-Stage Question: Emma Ellis (2017)
- Non-finalist Interview: Harley Emery (2014)

== Winners ==
| Year | Name | Hometown | Age | Local title | Talent | Placement at MAO Teen | Special scholarships at MAO Teen | Notes |
|---|---|---|---|---|---|---|---|---|
| 2026 | Aria Christensen | Eugene | 18 | Miss Lane County's Teen | Jazz Dance | Top 11 | Preliminary Fitness Award Preliminary Talent Award | |
| 2025 | Mila Pearl | Oregon City | 17 | Miss Portland-Metro's Teen | Musical Theater | Top 11 | | |
| 2024 | Kendyl Rae-Bartz | Oakland | 18 | Miss Douglas County's Teen | Ventriloquism | | | |
| 2023 | Lena Larecy | Roseburg | 17 | Miss Douglas County's Teen | Jazz Dance | | | |
| 2022 | Déja Fitzwater | Portland | 17 | Miss Evergreen's Outstanding Teen | Classical Vocal, "Les Filles de Cadix" | | | Later Miss Idaho 2026; National American Miss Teen 2024-25; Miss Idaho Teen USA 1st RU 2024; Portland Rose Festival's Queen of Rosaria 2023 |
| 2021 | Moira O'Bryan | Coos Bay | 18 | Miss Coos County's Outstanding Teen | Musical Theater Vocal | | | |
| 2019-20 | Marin Gray | Roseburg | 14 | Miss Umpqua Valley's Outstanding Teen | Ballet with Fan Veil, "Fire Dance" | | | Previously Miss Oregon Junior High School 2017 |
| 2018 | Kennedy Hjelte | Tualatin | 16 | Miss Three Rivers Outstanding Teen | Vocal, "On My Own" from Les Misérables | | | 1st runner-up at Miss Oregon Teen USA 2021 |
| 2017 | Emma Ellis | Portland | 17 | Miss Cascade's Outstanding Teen | Musical Theatre Vocal, "Taylor the Latte Boy" | | Non-finalist Evening Wear/OSQ Award Preliminary Evening Wear/OSQ Award | Semi-finalist at Miss Oregon USA 2020 |
| 2016 | Abigail Hoppe | Salem | 17 | Miss Three Rivers' Outstanding Teen | Ballet en Pointe | | | Later Miss Oregon 2024 |
| 2015 | Hailey Kilgore | Happy Valley | 16 | Miss Happy Valley's Outstanding Teen | Vocal, "Not For the Life of Me," from Thoroughly Modern Millie | | | Previously National American Miss Oregon Pre-Teen Later cast as Ti Moune in the 2018 Broadway revival of Once on This Island Nominated for 2018 Tony Award for Best Actress in a Musical for this role |
| 2014 | Nicole Carter | Klamath Falls | 17 | Miss Klamath County's Outstanding Teen | Vocal | | | |
| 2013 | Harley Emery | Eugene | 16 | Miss Lane County's Outstanding Teen | Piano | | Non-finalist Interview Award | Later Miss Oregon 2017 |
| 2012 | Marli Martin | Central Point | 14 | Miss Jackson County's Outstanding Teen | Vocal | | | |
| 2011 | Alexi Provost-Shean | Medford | 16 | Miss Southern Gem's Outstanding Teen | Dance | | | |
| 2010 | Rakiyah Johnson | Portland | 15 | Miss City of Roses' Outstanding Teen | | | | |
| 2009 | Amanda Gonzalez-Merrill | Springfield | 16 | Miss Tri-Valley's Outstanding Teen | Vocal, “Think of Me” | | | |
| 2008 | JoAnna Adkisson | Klamath Falls | 17 | Miss Klamath County's Outstanding Teen | Lyrical Dance, "Stand in the Rain" | | | |
| 2007 | Abigail Rodriguez | Gresham | 17 | Miss Portland's Outstanding Teen | | | | |
| 2006 | Kylee Willard | Grants Pass | 17 | Miss Josephine County's Outstanding Teen | Latin Dance | | | |
| 2005 | Katie Ericson | North Bend | 16 | Miss Coos County's Outstanding Teen | Classical Piano | | | |
| 2004 | Megan Corey | | | | | No national pageant | | |
| 2003 | Shelani Aiken | | | | | No national pageant | | |
