= Miss West Virginia's Teen =

Pageant in West Virginia

- Formation: 2005
- Type: Beauty pageant
- Location: West Virginia
- Members: Miss America's Teen
- Official language: English
- Key people: Dr. Tiffany Lawrence; Shelley Nichols-Franklin
- Website: Official website

The Miss West Virginia's Teen competition is the pageant that selects the representative for the U.S. state of West Virginia in the Miss America's Teen pageant.

Zoe Little of Huntington was crowned Miss West Virginia's Teen on June 20, 2026, at the Airborne Event Center in Martinsburg, West Virginia. She competed for the title of Miss America's Teen 2027 on September 5, 2026, at the Kravis Center for the Performing Arts in West Palm Beach, Florida.

== Results summary ==
The following is a visual summary of the past results of Miss West Virginia's Teen titleholders presented in the table below. The year in parentheses indicates year of the Miss America's Teen competition in which the placement and/or award was garnered.

=== Placements ===
- Top 12: Sabrina Harrison (2018)

=== Awards ===
==== Other awards ====
- Community Service: Bethany Lojewski (2009), Isabel Raese (2012), Morgan Breeden (2013)
- Outstanding Academic Achievement: Veronika Ohlinger (2006)
- Outstanding Dance Talent: Braelynn Neely (2016), Sabrina Harrison (2018)
- Random Acts of Kindness: Sabrina Harrison (2018)

== Winners ==
- Declared as Winner
- Ended as a runner-up
- Ended as a finalist or semi-finalist

Year	Name	Hometown	Age	Local title	Talent	Placement at MAO Teen	Special scholarships at MAO Teen	Notes
2026	Zoe Little	Huntington	16	Miss Clarksburg Winterfest's Teen	Baton Twirling			
2025	Delanie Graham	Kearneysville	17	Miss Shenandoah’s Teen	Dance			First Australian American to win title Later Miss Maryland Teen Volunteer 2027
2024	Demi Breeden	Charles Town	14	Miss Morgantown's Teen	Dance			Niece of Miss West Virginia's Outstanding Teen 2012 and Miss West Virginia 2016, Morgan Breeden
2023	Allison Dodson	Charles Town	17	Miss Jefferson County's Teen	Monologue			
2022	Civita Hooper	Colliers	16	Miss Morgantown's Outstanding Teen	Dance, "Forever Country"			
2021	Olivia Travis	Gerrardstown	16	Miss Berkeley County's Outstanding Teen	Lyrical Dance			Previously Miss West Virginia Jr. High America 2018; Top 16 at Miss Jr. High America 2018 pageant Later Miss West Virginia Teen USA 2024
2019-20	Lauren Rose	Morgantown	16	Miss Berkeley County's Outstanding Teen	Lyrical Dance, "A Million Dreams" from The Greatest Showman			
2018	Katelin Bocchetti	Shepherdstown	17	Miss Jefferson County's Outstanding Teen	Flute, "Dueling Banjos"			Married Dane Shields, the younger brother of Miss America 2017, Savvy Shields, in December 2022
2017	Sabrina Harrison	Martinsburg	16	Miss Berkeley County's Outstanding Teen	Hip Hop/ Contemporary Dance	Top 12	Outstanding Dance Talent Award Random Acts of Kindness Award	First African American to win title 1st Runner Up at Miss West Virginia 2021 & 2023 Pageants
2016	Grace Aulabaugh	Martinsburg	16	Miss Berkeley County's Outstanding Teen	Dance			
2015	Braelynn Neely	Morgantown	17	Miss University City's Outstanding Teen	Dance		Outstanding Dance Talent Award	
2014	June Braunlich	Wheeling	17	Miss Southern West Virginia's Outstanding Teen	Piano			2nd runner-up at Miss West Virginia 2016 pageant 2nd runner-up at Miss West Virginia 2018 pageant
2013	Emily Lopez	Clarksburg	17	Miss Harrison County's Outstanding Teen	Lyrical Dance			Previously Miss Junior Teen United States 2010 Filed lawsuit against Miss West Virginia Organization for not providing a $5,000 in-kind scholarship Later crowned Miss West Virginia Association of Fairs and Festivals 2016
2012	Morgan Breeden	Summit Point	17	Miss Shenandoah's Outstanding Teen	Piano		Community Service Award	Later Miss West Virginia 2016
2011	Isabel Raese	Morgantown	13	Miss Mon Valley's Outstanding Teen	Tap Dance		Community Service Award	
2010	Lacey Cyphers	Mannington		Miss Mountaineer Country's Outstanding Teen	Piano			
2009	Jackie Riggleman	Moorefield		Miss Teen Tucker County	Jazz Dance			
2008	Bethany Lojewski	Morgantown	15	Miss Teen Randolph County	Tap Dance		Community Service Award	3rd runner-up at Miss West Virginia 2016 pageant
2007	Courtney Nelson	Keyser		Miss Teen Eastern Panhandle	Vocal, “Wishing You Were Somehow Here Again” from The Phantom of the Opera			
2006	Kaitlin Gates	Bridgeport	14	Miss Teen Appalachia	Vocal			2nd runner-up at Miss West Virginia Teen USA 2008 pageant Later Miss West Virginia 2012
2005	Veronika Ohlinger	Letart	17	Miss Teen South Central	Vocal		Outstanding Academic Achievement Award	Later Miss Montana 2011
2004	Jessica Schueler			No Local Preliminary Level	Dance	No national pageant		3rd runner-up at Miss West Virginia USA 2012 pageant
