= Miss Utah's Teen =

Pageant

- Formation: 2005
- Type: Beauty pageant
- Headquarters: Provo
- Location: Utah
- Members: Miss America's Teen
- Official language: English
- Website: Official website

The Miss Utah's Teen competition is the pageant that selects the representative for the U.S. state of Utah in the Miss America's Teen pageant.

In January 2023, the official name of the pageant went from Miss Utah's Outstanding Teen to Miss Utah's Teen, in accordance with the national pageant.

Elle Anderson of American Fork was crowned Miss Utah's Teen on May 30, 2026, at the Covey Center for the Arts in Provo, Utah. She represented Utah and won the title of Miss America's Teen 2027 on September 5, 2026, in West Palm Beach, Florida.

Layla Jenkins of Monroe was named the new Miss Utah's Teen on September 9, 2026.

== Placements ==
The following is a visual summary of the past results of Miss Utah's Teen titleholders presented in the table below. The year in parentheses indicates year of the Miss America's Teen competition in which the placement and/or award was garnered.

- Miss America's Teen: Elle Anderson (2027)
- 1st runners-up: Lindsey Brinton (2008)
- 4th runners-up: Jennifer Gulbrandsen (2006)
- Top 10: Meredith Gaufin (2010), Tiare Keeno (2012)
- Top 11: Charlee Sorensen (2022), Jocelyn Osmond (2023), JayLynn Lindley (2024)
- Top 15: Marisa Nielsen (2011)

== Awards ==
=== Preliminary awards ===
- Preliminary Evening Gown: Elle Anderson (2027)
- Preliminary Evening Wear/On-Stage Question: Jessica Richards (2013)
- Preliminary Lifestyle and Fitness: Lindsey Brinton (2008), McKenna Lewis (2009)
- Preliminary Talent: Jennifer Gulbrandsen (2006), Jessica Richards (2013), Charlee Sorensen (2022), Elle Anderson (2027)

=== Non-finalist awards ===
- Non-finalist Evening Wear/On-Stage Question: Jessica Richards (2013)
- Non-finalist Talent: Jessica Richards (2013), JessiKate Riley (2015)

=== Other awards ===
- Academic Life: Meredith Gaufin (2010)
- America's Choice: Jocelyn Osmond (2023)
- Outstanding Instrumental Talent: Claire Inouye (2020)
- Random Acts of Kindness Award: Claire Inouye (2020)
- Teens in Action Award Winners: Tiare Keeno (2012)
- Top Vocal Talent Award: Charlee Sorensen (2022)

== Winners ==
- Declared as winner
- Ended as a runner-up
- Ended as a finalist or semi-finalist

Year	Name	Hometown	Age	Local title	Talent	Placement at MAO Teen	Special scholarships at MAO Teen	Notes
2026	Layla Jenkins	Monroe	18	Miss Nebo's Teen	Jazz Dance	Did not compete; originally 1st runner-up, later assumed the title when Anderson won Miss America's Teen 2027		
2026	Elle Anderson	American Fork	18	Miss Timpanogos' Teen	Violin	Winner	Preliminary Evening Gown Preliminary Talent Award	
2025	Brynn Lindley	Salem	17	Miss Valley's Teen	Acro Jazz			Sister of JayLynn Lindley, Miss Utah's Teen 2023
2024	Kira Gardner	Lehi	18	Miss Timpanogos' Teen	Hip Hop Dance			
2023	JayLynn Lindley	Salem	17	Miss South Valley's Teen	Dance	Top 11		Sister of Brynn Lindley, Miss Utah's Teen 2025
2022	Jocelyn Osmond	Alpine	15	Miss Alpine's Outstanding Teen	Piano	Top 11	America's Choice	Later Miss Utah Teen USA 2023; Top 20 Miss Teen USA 2023; Later Miss Utah Distinguished Young Woman 2024; Granddaughter of Virl Osmond, great-niece of Donny and Marie Osmond
2020–21 (Note: State competition took place in 2020, as national pageant postponed to 2021 for the 2022 edition due to the COVID-19 pandemic.)	Charlee Sorensen	Aurora	17	Miss Panoramaland's Outstanding Teen	Operatic Vocal	Top 11	Preliminary Talent Award Top Vocal Talent Award	Younger sister of Savvy Sorensen, Miss Utah's Outstanding Teen 2015
2019	Claire Inouye	Orem	16	Miss Vineyard's Outstanding Teen	Piano, "Hungarian Rhapsody No. 6" by Franz Liszt		Outstanding Instrumental Talent Award Random Acts of Kindness Award	1st runner-up at Distinguished Young Woman of Utah 2021 Later Top 7 at Miss Utah 2022
2018	Axuray Talbot	Spanish Fork	16	Miss Spanish Fork's Outstanding Teen	Dance, "This is Me"			
2017	Addelyn Brotherson	Wales	14	Miss Sanpete County's Outstanding Teen	Lyrical Dance, “Keep Me"			
2016	Madeline Pettit	Bountiful	16	Miss Davis County's Outstanding Teen	Piano, "Etude Op. 72, No. 6" by Moritz Moszkowski			
2015	Savvy Sorensen	Aurora	16	Miss Central Utah's Outstanding Teen	Jazz Lyrical Dance, "I Got You" from Bring It On			Older sister of Charlee Sorensen, Miss Utah's Outstanding Teen 2020
2014	JessiKate Riley	Beaver	16	Miss Southern Utah's Outstanding Teen	Violin		Non-finalist Talent Award	Later Miss Utah 2017, Miss Utah USA 2021 & Top 16 at Miss USA 2021
2013	Jessica Coomb	Draper	16	Miss Wasatch Front's Outstanding Teen	Piano			
2012	Jessica Richards	Sandy	16	Miss Draper's Outstanding Teen	Piano		Non-finalist Evening Wear/OSQ Award Non-finalist Talent Award Preliminary Evening Wear/OSQ Award Preliminary Talent Award	Daughter of Miss Utah USA 1986, Stephanie Reber Richards
2011	Tiare Keeno	Spanish Fork	15		Contemporary Dance, "Spirit of the Earth"	Top 10	Teens in Action Award	
2010	Marisa Nielsen	Hyrum			Vocal, "I Will Fly" from Little Women	Top 15		
2009	Meredith Gaufin	Provo			Harp	Top 10	Academic Life Award	Later Utah's Junior Miss 2010; 1st runner-up at America's Junior Miss 2010
2008	McKenna Lewis	Smithfield					Preliminary Lifestyle & Fitness Award	
2007	Lindsey Brinton	Salt Lake Valley	16		Piano	1st runner-up	Preliminary Lifestyle & Fitness Award	Later America's Junior Miss 2008
2006	Tasha Smedley	Syracuse			Modern Lyrical Dance			Later Miss Utah Teen USA 2009; Top 15 at Miss Teen USA 2009 pageant NFL cheerleader for the Dallas Cowboys between 2016 and 2018
2005	Jennifer Gulbrandsen	Provo	17		Piano	4th runner-up	Preliminary Talent Award	
