= Miss California's Teen =

- Formation: 1999
- Type: Scholarship pageant
- Headquarters: Fresno
- Location: California
- Members: Miss America's Teen
- Official language: English
- Key people: Marissa Honey-Plata; Adam Smith (State Directors)
- Website: Official website

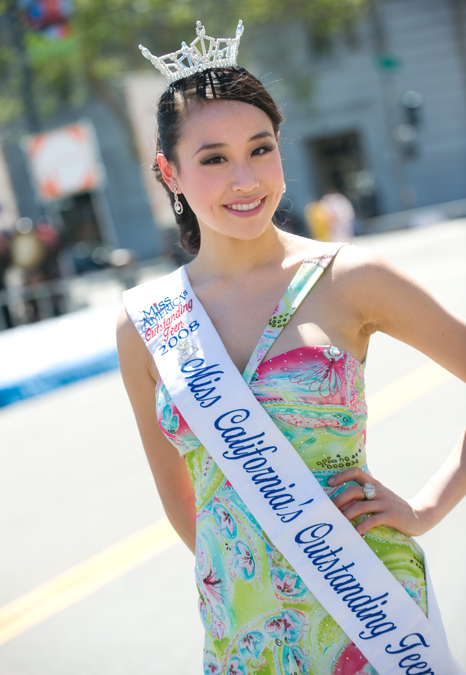
Crystal Lee, Miss California's Outstanding Teen 2008

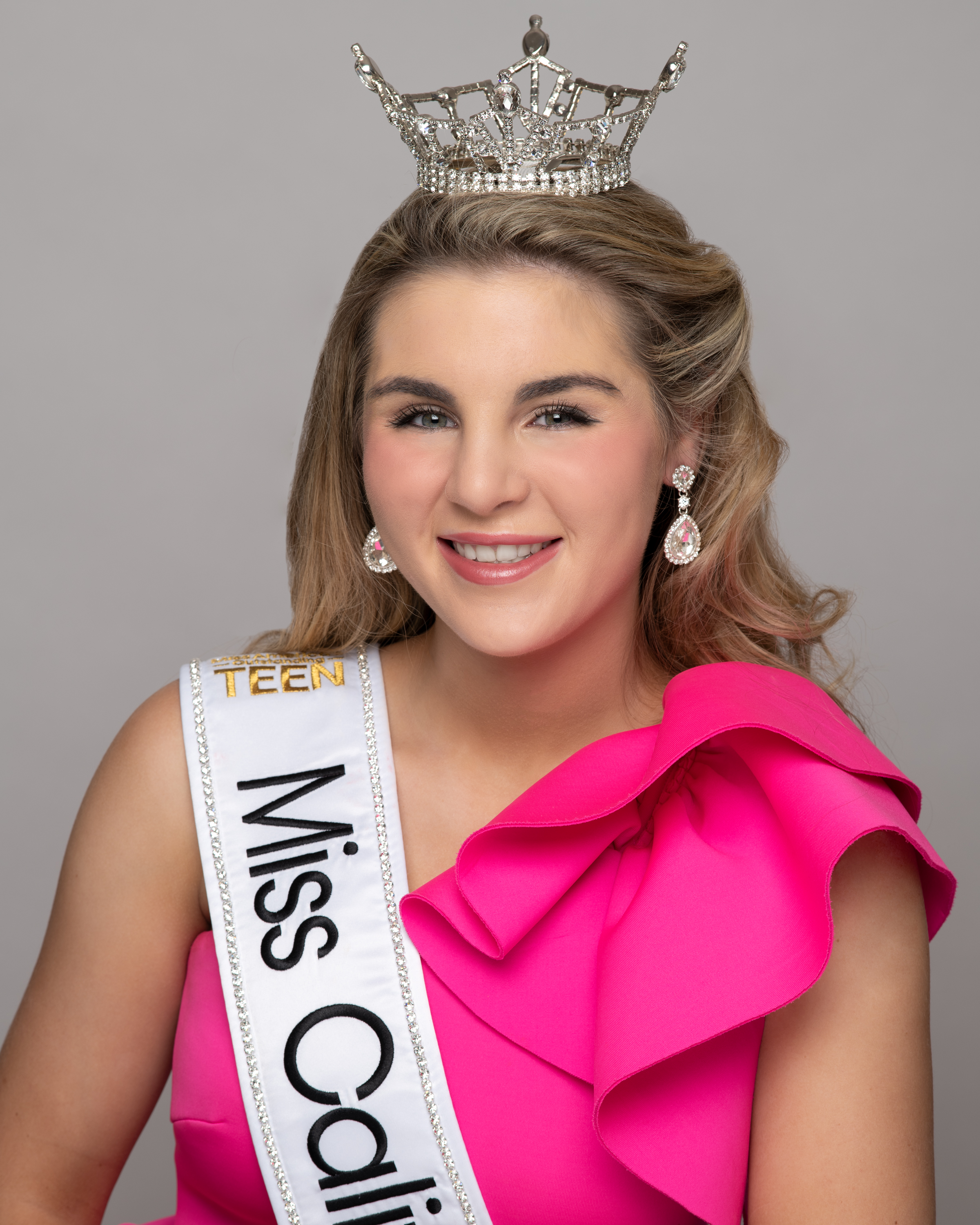
Olivia DeFrank Miss California's Teen 2022

The Miss California's Teen competition is the pageant that selects the representative for the U.S. state of California in the Miss America's Teen pageant. The program started in June 1999 which was the first Outstanding Teen program in the nation. This later inspired the creation of the Miss America's Outstanding Teen pageant in 2005.

In January 2023, the official name of the pageant was changed from Miss California’s Outstanding Teen, to Miss California’s Teen, in accordance with the national pageant.

Julianne Rocke of Placentia was crowned Miss California's Teen on June 19, 2026, at the William Saroyan Theatre in Fresno, California. She competed for the title of Miss America's Teen 2027 on September 5, 2026, at the Kravis Center for the Performing Arts in West Palm Beach, Florida.

== Results summary ==
The following is a visual summary of the past results of Miss California's Teen titleholders presented in the table below. The year in parentheses indicates year of the Miss America's Teen competition in which the placement and/or award was garnered.

=== Placements ===
- 1st runners-up: Arianna Afsar (2006)
- 4th runners-up: Monica Stainer (2010)
- Top 9: Cameron Doan (2019)
- Top 10: Crystal Lee (2009)
- Top 11: Olivia DeFrank (2023), Keira Bixler (2025), Jasmine Wu (2026)
- Top 12: Grace Grant (2013)
- Top 15: Jessa Carmack (2012)

=== Awards ===
==== Preliminary awards ====
- Preliminary Evening Wear/On-Stage Question: Monica Stainer (2010), Cameron Doan (2019)
- Preliminary Lifestyle and Fitness: Crystal Lee (2009)
- Preliminary Talent: Arianna Afsar (2006), Monica Stainer (2010)
- Preliminary Evening Gown: Jasmine Wu (2026)

==== Other awards ====
- Community Service Award: Shelby Sinkler (2011)
- Teens in Action 1st Runner-up: Olivia DeFrank (2023)
- Teens in Action Finalist: Jasmine Wu (2026)

== Winners ==
- Declared as Winner
- Ended as a runner-up
- Ended as a finalist or semi-finalist

Year	Name	Hometown	Age	Local title	Talent	Placement at MAO Teen	Special scholarships at MAO Teen	Notes
2026	Julianne Rocke	Placentia	18	Miss Culver City’s Teen	Flamenco Dance			
2025	Jasmine Wu	San Jose	16	Miss Monterey County’s Teen	Gymnastics/Dance	Top 11	Preliminary Evening Gown Award Teens in Action Finalist	
2024	Keira Bixler	Visalia	18	Miss Fresno County's Teen	Ballet en Pointe	Top 11		
2023	Marlie Wright	San Diego	18	Miss San Diego's Teen	HERStory			
2022	Olivia Defrank	Los Angeles	17	Miss Anaheim's Outstanding Teen	Piano	Top 11	Teens in Action 1st runner-up	Younger sister of Miss Ohio's Outstanding Teen 2019-2020, Madison DeFrank
2021	Maya Alvarez-Coyne	Irvine	18	Miss Canyon Hills' Outstanding Teen	Irish Fusion Dance			First Latina to win the title of Miss California's Outstanding Teen
2019-20	Isabella Mills	San Francisco	15	Miss Santa Clara's Outstanding Teen	Ballet en Pointe, "Tambourine Variation" from La Esmeralda			
2018	Cameron Doan	Anaheim	16	Miss Anaheim's Outstanding Teen	Baton Twirling, "Come Alive"	Top 9	Preliminary Evening Wear/OSQ Award	Later Miss California Teen USA 2021
2017	Violet Joy Hansen	El Dorado Hills	17	Miss Central California's Outstanding Teen	Vocal, "Olympia's Aria" from The Tales of Hoffmann			4th Runner-Up to Miss Massachusetts 2024
2016	Jenna Tower	Garden Grove	17	Miss Garden Grove's Outstanding Teen	Roller Skating			3-time National Roller Skating Champion
2015	Avery Grooms	Fresno	17	Miss Sierra Nevada's Outstanding Teen	Lyrical Dance			
2014	Kyla Reed	Tehachapi	17	Miss Orange County's Outstanding Teen	Piano			
2013	Mikaela Harris	Clovis	16	Miss Clovis' Outstanding Teen	Piano			1st Runner Up at Miss California 2024
2012	Grace Grant	San Francisco	17	Miss Golden Gate's Outstanding Teen	Ballet	Top 12		
2011	Jessa Carmack	Santa Clara	17	Miss Mission City's Outstanding Teen	Dance	Top 15		Later Miss California 2016; Top 10 at Miss America 2017 pageant
2010	Shelby Sinkler	Fremont	17	Miss East Bay Cities' Outstanding Teen	Tap Dance, “Fabulous Feet”		Community Service Award	
2009	Monica Stainer	Huntington Beach	15	Miss City of Los Angeles Outstanding Teen	Classical Ballet	4th runner-up	Preliminary Evening Wear/OSQ Award Preliminary Talent Award	
2008	Crystal Lee	San Francisco	16	Miss San Francisco's Outstanding Teen	Ballet en Pointe	Top 10	Preliminary Lifestyle & Fitness Award	Later Miss California 2013; 1st runner-up at Miss America 2014 pageant
2007	Jordan Krinke	Placentia	16	Miss Placentia's Outstanding Teen	Lyrical Dance			Later National Sweetheart 2013
2006	Summer Clark	Elk Grove	16	Miss Elk Grove's Outstanding Teen	Drums			
2005	Arianna Afsar	San Diego	13	Miss San Diego's Outstanding Teen	Vocal, “Don’t Rain on My Parade” from Funny Girl	1st runner-up	Preliminary Talent Award	Top 36 contestant on America Idol Later Miss California 2010; Top 10 at Miss America 2011 pageant Starred as Elizabeth Schuyler Hamilton in the Chicago production of Hamilton
2004	Elizabeth Tang	Valencia	15	Miss Culver City's Outstanding Teen	Piano	No national pageant		Twin sisters who both won the title
2004	Isabella Tang	Valencia	15	Miss Los Angeles County's Outstanding Teen	Piano	No national pageant		Twin sisters who both won the title
2003	Devon Guthrie	Claremont	16	Miss Hollywood's Outstanding Teen	Operatic Aria	No national pageant		
2002	Katina Mitchell	La Jolla	16	Miss San Diego's Outstanding Teen	Classical Vocal	No national pageant		
2001	Kendall Lewis	Visalia	17	Miss Tulare County's Outstanding Teen	Vocal	No national pageant		
2001	Ashley Newton	Valencia	16	Miss Los Angeles County's Outstanding Teen	Vocal	No national pageant		
2000	Jessica Kloor	El Cajon	16	Miss San Diego's Outstanding Teen	Vocal	No national pageant		
1999	Shirin Bakhshay	Lodi	16	Miss San Joaquin County's Outstanding Teen	Dance	No national pageant		
