= Distinguished Young Women =

Pageant for high school students

Distinguished Young Women, formerly known as America's Junior Miss, is a national non-profit organization that provides scholarship opportunities to high school senior girls. Depending on the schedule of the various state and local programs, young women are eligible during the summer preceding their senior year in high school. This program is designed to provide young women with the opportunity and support needed to succeed before, during, and after attending college. In addition, through the Distinguished Young Women Life Skills program, which includes workshops and online resources, participants can learn skills like interviewing, public speaking, self-confidence building and much more. Since its creation in 1958, over 700,000 young ladies have participated in competitions spanning the United States. Participants compete in the categories of Interview (25%), Scholastics (25%), Talent (20%), Fitness (15%), and Self-Expression (15%). Each state hosts a state program in which the chosen representative advances to the national program, held in the program's birthplace of Mobile, Alabama. Each year the Distinguished Young Women program gives out over $1 billion in scholarships. The Distinguished Young Women program is free to enter.

== History ==
=== Early years ===
In the late 1920s, Mobile's Junior Chamber of Commerce, known today as the Jaycees, began the earliest form of the Junior Miss program as an annual floral pageant in the spring to encourage participation from residents in local beautification projects, including azalea flowers. The winner of the pageant would eventually choose her successor to carry on the role of representing the annual program: an act similar to what every America's Junior Miss has done a year after winning the title, but it's the judges who decide first.

Shortly after the Second World War, the Junior Chamber changed the program especially for young high school juniors to participate. Prizes included the honor of being queen of the Azalea Trail Maids, Mobile's official hostesses at special events. Before 1957, the Junior Chamber realized that not only were Mobilians participating in their program, so were Mississippi and Florida residents. It was decided that year to make the program national, allowing high school seniors from every state to participate in the renamed America's Junior Miss. Unlike the Miss America pageant which started as a beauty pageant, but now includes judging on Evening Gown, Private 10 Minute Interview, On Stage Q & A, Talent, and Fitness, America's Junior Miss has always been a scholarship program. America's Junior Miss participants were required to be seniors in high school and were judged on scholastic achievement, creative and performing arts, physical fitness, poise and appearance, and a judges' interview. Bathing suits were never a part of the America's Junior Miss.

The first national finals were held in March 1958 at the Saenger Theater in downtown Mobile, with 18 states represented. Phyllis Whitenack of West Virginia won $5000 in scholarship money, along with the title of America's Junior Miss.

=== 1960s ===
In 1963, all 50 states had their own Junior Miss in the national finals. The 1960s was a decade of excellence for the America's Junior Miss program, with new sponsors such as Kodak and Chevrolet, the program was able to continue increasing scholarship beyond $24,000 and bring Mobile's annual event before the eyes of network television viewers regularly for 20 years starting in 1965. From 1965-1972, the pageant was telecast on NBC. Among the entertainers invited to perform at the finals early in the Sixties was Eddie Fisher. In this decade, two holders of the Junior Miss title would soon lead successful careers while supporting the organization that helped them along the way. Missouri Junior Miss and America's Junior Miss 1961 Mary Frann would one day appear on TV programs such as Newhart and numerous variety shows in her acting career. Frann helped found the alumnae organization America's Junior Miss Council in 1995. Kentucky Junior Miss and America's Junior Miss 1963 Diane Sawyer continued to support the program as her career in journalism continued, which led to a position at the ABC Television Network program Good Morning America and most recently to be the second woman to individually hold the anchor chair nationally for a nightly news program World News on ABC television (Barbara Walters, Elizabeth Vargas and Connie Chung co-anchored with male counterparts).

=== 1970s ===
The New Seekers appeared at the May 1973 finals, hosted by Ed McMahon. Beginning in 1973, the telecast aired annually on CBS, where it would stay through 1985. Actor Michael Landon would host the national finals for the first time in 1974, his first out of seven appearances. Also in 1974, Donna Alexander of New Jersey, became the first black female to reach this point of the competition. Alumni from this decade include America's Junior Miss 1973 Linda Rutledge Delbridge of Kansas, who would one day become a computer scientist and executive for IBM. Georgia Junior Miss 1976 Deborah Norville followed a journalism career path that would earn her the job of hosting the syndicated news program Inside Edition. Maryland Junior Miss 1971 was Kathie Lee Gifford, who would one day host a syndicated talk show with TV personality Regis Philbin. In spite of never advancing to the 1971 finals, Georgia contender Kim Basinger would later have an acting career that would lead her to an Academy Award for Best Supporting Actress for her role in the movie L.A. Confidential. Before becoming a Tony Award-winning producer, Bonnie Comley, won the talent competition in the Junior Miss Massachusetts program in 1977.

=== 1980s ===
Andy Gibb performed for the audience and the Junior Misses participating at the 1980 national finals. One year later, the format known as "theater in the round" was introduced for the finals and its television broadcasts. Mary Frann returned for the finals in 1985 to co-host with Bruce Jenner (now known as Caitlyn Jenner), the last telecast in an annual run on CBS that began in 1973. The outreach program "Be Your Best Self" became the official platform of the America's Junior Miss program in 1987, when Wisconsin's Junior Miss Chuti Tiu became the first non-Caucasian national winner. America's Junior Miss 1980 Julie Bryan Moran hosted the finals in 1988. The national finals were moved from the Mobile Civic Center arena to the theater section in 1989. Among the Junior Miss participants in this decade who would become well known were Georgia's Julie Moran, who would anchor the syndicated TV program Entertainment Tonight and 1986 Rhode Island Junior Miss Debra Messing, whose acting career led to earning one of the leading roles in the sitcom Will & Grace. At the end of the Eighties, the name of the program was changed to "America's Young Woman of the Year" to renew interest, but it was later realized that this new identity was unlike the long established brand of America's Junior Miss that interested many participants. The name "America's Junior Miss" would be restored in 1993.

=== 1990s ===
In 1994, the America's Junior Miss finals once again became a national event on television. One of the guests this time was actor Brian Austin Green of the TV series Beverly Hills, 90210. One year later, the NBC Television Network stopped televising the finals. The judging criteria for the local and national levels of the program would be revamped in 1995. With help from David G. Bronner of the Retirement Systems of Alabama and Raycom Media, viewers got to see Alabama's Junior Miss Tyrenda Williams become the first black America's Junior Miss in 1997 and earn $30,000 in scholarship out of a total of $97,500 for the winners. The number of stations airing the national finals would increase from 50 to 177 in 1998. The 1999 finals, hosted by 1976 Georgia Junior Miss Deborah Norville aired tape-delayed on The Nashville Network, which would air the event live in 2000 and 2001.

=== 2000s ===
In 2000, for the first time ever, a scholarship of $50,000 was the top prize and Utah Junior Miss Jesika Henderson earned it along with the title of America's Junior Miss that year. Both Deborah Norville and Karen Morris Gowdy took part in the 2001 finals, with Norville hosting the finals and Gowdy handling the preliminary round. Singer Toby Keith provided entertainment for the finals. Dan Marino joined Norville for the finals in 2002, which aired nationally on the PAX TV network. Billy Gilman and 3rd Faze were also part of the 2002 finals. The 2004 finals were a little different from previous years, as the 50 Junior Misses were taped for documentary segments spanning their two weeks of preparation.

In 2005, the AJM Board of Directors' executive committee was unsuccessful at retaining sponsors and a major television network willing enough to broadcast the national finals. The Board of Directors had no choice but to make the 2005 national finals on June 25 possibly the very last for America's Junior Miss. After Mississippi's Junior Miss Kelli Lynn Schutz was chosen and given a $50,000 scholarship, she was not originally scheduled for any of the traditional AJM appearances. The 2005 finals, hosted by 2000 America's Junior Miss Jesika Henderson and actor Nicky Brown, airing live on the Mobile CBS affiliate WKRG-TV and pre-recorded for PAX TV on June 27 was a celebration of all 48 years of accomplishing a feat that no other organization similar to AJM would attempt: prepare and encourage the lives of young women beginning to enter a new world of possibility.

The organization had originally set a date of September 30, 2005 to end operations. A group of concerned Junior Miss supporters, under the band of Friends of AJM and with the website saveajm.org, fought for the continuation of the program. On August 9 the board of directors decided that the national finals should continue to be held in Mobile, only without any national television coverage as part of the new budget.

Through the efforts of Junior Miss supporters across the country, America's Junior Miss continued operations from the national headquarters in Mobile. The board of directors hired Becky Jo Peterson, formerly chair of the California Junior Miss program, as the new executive director. In June 2006, 50 state Junior Misses spent two weeks in Mobile, Alabama, for the 49th annual national finals where Kentucky's Junior Miss Taylor Phillips was chosen as the new America's Junior Miss. More than $100,000 in scholarships were awarded at the national finals to the class of 2006.

2007 marked the 50th anniversary of America's Junior Miss. The national finals were held June 28–30 at the Mobile Civic Center Theater in Mobile, where more than $150,000 in scholarships were awarded.

=== 2010s ===
It was announced on June 26, 2010 that America's Junior Miss would now be renamed Distinguished Young Women. This change was intended in part to help differentiate the program from pageants. Idaho's Madison Denise Leonard was named America's first Distinguished Young Woman. Tennessee's Katye Brock was Named America's 2011 Distinguished Young Woman. Christina Maxwell of Asheville, North Carolina was named Distinguished Young Woman of America for 2012. Nicole Renard of Washington State was named Distinguished Young Woman of America for 2013. Brooke Rucker of Georgia was the Distinguished Young Woman of America for 2014. On June 27, 2015, Alaska's Máire Nakada was named the Distinguished Young Woman of America for 2015. In 2016, Tara Moore of South Carolina was named Distinguished Young Woman of America. The next year saw Skye Bork of DC named Distinguished Young Woman of 2017. On June 30, 2018, Aaryan Morrison from Kokomo, Indiana was named Distinguished Young Woman of 2018.

=== 2020s ===
2020 saw the competition held for the first time virtually resulting from COVID-19 pandemic.

== Past winners ==
Year	Date	Winner	State/District	City	Age	Awards	Talent	Notes
1958	March 1, 1958	Phyllis Whitenack	West Virginia	Bluefield	17		Dramatic monologue	Given title "Junior Miss America"
1959	March 7, 1959	Judi Humphrey	Pennsylvania	Lewistown	17		Dramatic reading, "If—" by Rudyard Kipling	Title renamed "America’s Junior Miss"
1960	March 26, 1960	Maureen Sullivan	Connecticut	West Haven	17			
1961	March 24, 1961	Mary Frances Luecke	Missouri	St. Louis	18			
1962	March 23, 1962	Jean Allen	Rhode Island	Providence	17			
1963	March 16, 1963	Diane Sawyer	Kentucky	Louisville	17			Former anchor of ABC World News
1964	March 21, 1964	Linda Felber	(Washington (state)) Washington	Colfax	18			
1965	March 19, 1965	Patrice Gaunder	Michigan	St. Joseph	17			
1966	March 26, 1966	Diane Wilkins	Wisconsin	Wauwatosa	18			
1967	March 18, 1967	Rosemary Dunaway	Arkansas	Little Rock	18			
1968	March 15, 1968	Debi Faubion	Oklahoma	Norman				
1969	May 6, 1969	Jackie Bennington	California	Huntington Beach				
1970	May 13, 1970	Karen Stenwall	Arizona	Phoenix	18		Ballet	
1971	May 5, 1971	Arlene Stens	New Jersey	Woodlynne	18			
1972	May 9, 1972	Lydia Hodson	Kentucky	Lexington	17			
1973	May 9, 1973	Linda Rutledge	Kansas	Fort Leavenworth	18		Classical piano	
1974	May 6, 1974	Karen Morris	Wyoming	Cheyenne	18	Preliminary Fitness; Preliminary Poise & Appearance		
1975	May 6, 1975	Julie Ann Forshee	Arkansas	Fayetteville	17	Preliminary Fitness; Preliminary Poise & Appearance	Ballet/Gymnastics routine, "Music Box Mannequin"	
1976	May 10, 1976	Lenne Jo Hallgren	(Washington (state)) Washington	Clarkston	18			
1977	May 9, 1977	Christy Moller	Arkansas				Ballet, "Doll on a Music Box"	
1978	May 8, 1978	Kim Crosby	Missouri	Springfield	17	Preliminary Poise & Appearance	Vocal, Medley from Cinderella	Starred in Guys and Dolls and Into the Woods on Broadway
1979	April 14, 1979	Susan Horvath	Pennsylvania	Johnstown	17	Preliminary Fitness; Preliminary Poise & Appearance	Dance	
1980	July 2, 1980	Julie Bryan	(Georgia (U.S. state)) Georgia	Thomasville	18		Vocal, Medley from The King and I	Former weekend anchor and co-host for Entertainment Tonight
1981	June 18, 1981	Kimberly Smith	North Carolina	Raleigh	17	Preliminary Talent	Acrobatic jazz dance, "Be a Clown"	
1982	June 22, 1982	Susan Hammett	Mississippi	Hattiesburg	17		Vocal, "First Love"	
1983	June 21, 1983	Stephanie Ashmore	Alabama	Muscle Shoals	18	Overall Fitness; Overall Poise & Appearance	Ballet, "Bless the Beasts"	Mother of Distinguished Young Women of Mississippi 2012, Mallory Pitts
1984	June 20, 1984	Amber Kvanli	Minnesota	Willmar	17		Vocal, "The Varsity Drag"	
1985	June 21, 1985	Valerie Lowrance	Texas	Seguin	17	Overall Fitness	Song and dance routine, "New York, New York"	
1986	June 21, 1986	Lori Jo Smith	Virginia	Vienna	18		Jazz dance	
1987	June 20, 1987	Chuti Tiu	Wisconsin	West Allis	17		Classical piano	First non-Caucasian winner Later Miss Illinois 1994
1988	June 25, 1988	Kristen Logan	Mississippi	Hattiesburg	17	Overall Fitness	Vocal, "Somewhere Out There"	
1989	July 22, 1989	Kristin Huxhold	Missouri	Kirkwood	18	Overall Interview	Vocal	Title renamed "America's Young Woman of the Year"; Appeared on Broadway in ensemble of Les Misérables
1990	July 14, 1990	Sara Martin	Illinois	Schaumburg	19		Vocal	Later Miss Illinois 1993
1991	June 26, 1991	Amy Goodman	California					
1992	June 27, 1992	Tiffany Stoker	California	Clovis			Vocal	Later Miss California 1995; 3rd runner-up at Miss America 1996 pageant
1993	June 26, 1993	Rebecca Jones	(Georgia (U.S. state)) Georgia	Calhoun	18			Title renamed "America's Junior Miss"
1994	July 23, 1994	Amy Osmond	Utah	Bountiful	17	Spirit Award	Violin	Niece of Donny and Marie Osmond
1995	July 1, 1995	Kiersten Rickenbach	New Jersey	Washington Township	18		Dance	Died of cocaine overdose in 2015
1996	June 29, 1996	Andrea Plummer	Tennessee	Collierville	18		Ballet, "Forrest Gump Suite"	Later Miss New York 2001, 4th runner-up at Miss America 2002 pageant
1997	June 29, 1997	Tyrenda Williams	Alabama	Birmingham	18			First African American crowned
1998	June 29, 1998	Susan Davidson	Pennsylvania	Butler	18	Overall Scholastics; Overall Talent	Piano, "Toccatta" by Aram Khachaturian	
1999	June 28, 1999	Sarah Jane Everman	(Georgia (U.S. state)) Georgia	Kennesaw	18	Fitness Category; Presence & Composure Category	Vocal, "Don't Rain on My Parade" from Funny Girl	Appeared in Wicked, Bright Star, and Cats on Broadway
2000	June 28, 2000	Jesika Henderson	Utah	St. George	18		Modern dance, "Stradivarius"	
2001	June 27, 2001	Carrie Colvin	Alabama	Birmingham	18		Jazz dance, "America" from West Side Story	
2002	June 28, 2002	Amy Kerr	Oregon	Keizer		Overall Poise; Overall Talent	Operatic vocal, "Quando m'en vo'" from La bohème	
2003	June 28, 2003	Andrea Finch	California	Indio	18			
2004	June 26, 2004	Shannon Essenpreis	Texas	Garland	18	Overall Self Expression	Vocal	
2005	June 26, 2005	Kelli Schutz	Mississippi	Brandon		Overall Fitness; Overall Self Expression	Ballet	Married to former NFL quarterback, Brodie Croyle
2006	June 28, 2006	Taylor Phillips	Kentucky	Versailles			Dance	
2007	June 30, 2007	Nora Ali	Minnesota	Mendota Heights	17		Violin, "Zigeunerweisen," by Pablo de Sarasate	
2008	June 28, 2008	Lindsey Brinton	Utah	Salt Lake City	18	Fitness Category; Interview Category; Scholastics Category; Talent Category	Piano	Previously Miss Utah's Outstanding Teen 2007; 1st runner-up at Miss America's Outstanding Teen 2008 pageant
2009	June 27, 2009	Michelle Rodgers	Kentucky	Winchester		Interview Category	Vocal, "Taylor the Latte Boy"	
2010	June 26, 2010	Madison Leonard	Idaho	Coeur d'Alene			Vocal/Piano, "The Nearness of You" by Hoagy Carmichael	Title renamed "Distinguished Young Woman"
2011	June 25, 2011	Katye Brock	Tennessee	Tullahoma	18		Vocal, "Defying Gravity" from Wicked	
2012	June 30, 2012	Christina Maxwell	North Carolina	Asheville	18		Vocal, "The Phantom of the Opera"	
2013	June 29, 2013	Nicole Renard	(Washington (state)) Washington	Kennewick	18	Talent Category	Musical theater dance, "Amazing Mayzie" from Seussical	Previously Miss Washington's Outstanding Teen 2011; Later Miss Washington 2017
2014	June 28, 2014	Brooke Rucker	(Georgia (U.S. state)) Georgia	Cartersville	18	Fitness Category; Interview Category	Tap dance, "Hot Honey Rag" from Chicago	
2015	June 27, 2015	Máire Nakada	Alaska	Anchorage	18	Interview Category; Talent Category	Irish step dance, "Trolleyed" by Beoga	
2016	June 25, 2016	Tara Moore	South Carolina	Easley		Fitness Category; Self-expression Category; Talent Category	Jazz dance	
2017	July 1, 2017	Skye Bork	(Washington, D.C.) District of Columbia	Washington, D.C.	18	Fitness Category; Interview Category; Self-expression Category; Scholastics Category; Talent Category	Classical ballet en pointe, "Carmen Suite No. 1 Aragonaise" by Georges Bizet	
2018	June 30, 2018	Aaryan Morrison	Indiana	Kokomo		Interview Category; Scholastics Category; Talent Category	Lyrical dance, "To Build a Home"	First generation South African American
2019	June 29, 2019	Dora Guo	Illinois	Vernon Hills		Interview Category; Scholastics Category	Traditional Mongolian fan dance	First generation Chinese American
2020	June 27, 2020	Elif Ozyurekoglu	Kentucky	Louisville				
2021	June 26, 2021	Destiny Cluck	(Georgia (U.S. state)) Georgia	Kennesaw			Ballet en pointe, Astor Piazzolla’s “Primavera Portena”	
2022	June 25, 2022	Katelyn Cai	Arizona	Scottsdale		Scholastics Category; Interview Category; Talent Category; Self-expression Category; Fitness Category	Contemporary dance routine, “This Woman’s Work,” by Kate Bush	Previously Miss Arizona's Outstanding Teen 2019; 1st runner-up at Miss America's Outstanding Teen 2020
2023	June 24, 2023	Carrington Hodge	Alabama	Helena		Interview Category; Talent Category; Self-expression Category; Fitness Category	Dance routine, "Blackbird"	
2024	June 29, 2024	Alicia Chu	Delaware	Newark		Scholastics Category Interview Category Talent Category Self-Expression Category	Vocal	
2025	June 28, 2025	Nikita Chincholkar	Oregon	Portland		Scholastics Category Interview Category Talent Category Fitness Category	Bharatanatyam Fusion Dance	
2026	June 27, 2026	Audrey Chen	California	Encino		Interview Category Talent Category Fitness Category	Lyrical Dance, "Lost"	

== Winners by state ==
State	Number of titles won	Year(s) won
Kentucky	5	1963, 1972, 2006, 2009, 2020
Georgia	5	1980, 1993, 1999, 2014, 2021
California	5	1969, 1991, 1992, 2003, 2026
Alabama	4	1983, 1997, 2001, 2023
Washington	3	1964, 1976, 2013
Utah	3	1994, 2000, 2008
Mississippi	3	1982, 1988, 2005
Pennsylvania	3	1959, 1979, 1998
Missouri	3	1961, 1978, 1989
Arkansas	3	1967, 1975, 1977
Arizona	2	1970, 2022
Illinois	2	1990, 2019
Oregon	2	2002, 2025
North Carolina	2	1981, 2012
Tennessee	2	1996, 2011
Minnesota	2	1984, 2007
Texas	2	1985, 2004
Wisconsin	2	1966, 1987
New Jersey	2	1971, 1995
Delaware	1	2024
Indiana	1	2018
District of Columbia	1	2017
South Carolina	1	2016
Alaska	1	2015
Idaho	1	2010
Virginia	1	1986
Wyoming	1	1974
Kansas	1	1973
Oklahoma	1	1968
Michigan	1	1965
Rhode Island	1	1962
Connecticut	1	1960
West Virginia	1	1958

=== States without winners ===
There have been no winners from the following states:

- Colorado
- Florida
- Hawaii
- Iowa
- Louisiana
- Maine
- Maryland
- Massachusetts
- Montana
- Nebraska
- Nevada
- New Hampshire
- New Mexico
- New York
- North Dakota
- Ohio
- South Dakota
- Vermont
