= The 20th Century Fox Mambo =

Single by Smash cast feat. Katharine McPhee

from the album The Music of Smash, Bombshell
- Released: February 13, 2012
- Recorded: 2012
- Genre: Pop
- Length: 2:44 (Single Version)
- Label: Columbia
- Composer: Marc Shaiman
- Lyricists: Marc Shaiman; Scott Wittman
- Producer: Marc Shaiman

Smash cast singles chronology
"Let Me Be Your Star" (2012)	"The 20th Century Fox Mambo" (2012)	"Mr. & Mrs. Smith" (2012)

"The 20th Century Fox Mambo" is an original song introduced in the second episode of the first season of the musical TV series Smash, entitled "The Callback". It was written by Marc Shaiman and Scott Wittman, but in the show's universe, it was written by songwriting team Tom Levitt (Christian Borle) and Julia Houston (Debra Messing) for their Marilyn Monroe musical Bombshell.

In "The Callback" episode, Karen Cartwright (Katharine McPhee) needs to give a dance audition for the producing team as part of trying to get the role of Marilyn in Bombshell. She works with director and choreographer Derek Wills (Jack Davenport) and then performs this song with the ensemble members in front of the producing team.

The song is reprised several more times during the first season. It is performed by Ivy Lynn (Megan Hilty) in the fourth episode "The Cost of Art", by Karen and Ivy separately in the seventh episode "The Workshop, and by Karen in the fifteenth episode "Bombshell"

The song, with McPhee's vocals, was originally released as a single on iTunes and Amazon.com's MP3 store and is currently available on the cast albums The Music of Smash and Bombshell.

== Production ==
JJ of TV Is My Pacifier describes the song's importance to the plot in The Callback, "For [Ivy and Karen's] audition, Derek choreographed a dance to “20th Century Fox Mambo,” and we focus mostly on Karen having a hard time with the choreography....When Friday’s final callback finally arrives, Ivy and Karen are both nervously waiting to go in and audition. When Tom and a few backup dancers go sit with Ivy to support her, Julia turns to Karen and offers her some supportive words. We [then] get to see the complete staged version of “20th Century Fox Mambo” performed by Karen." Noel Murray of The AV Club says "after Karen gives her big dance audition to “The 20th Century Fox Mambo”...the Marilyn creative team indicates that she nailed it". Scott Brown of Vulture says "the conceit of the song is: Norma J's, in for a Fox screen test in the mid-forties, has been asked to foxtrot, but she breaks into a mambo instead". Brown notes that the song is "the only totally realized original this episode", and theorised that "the weekly pattern's looking like this: one fleshed-out original song, one partly realized original song or reprise, and two big covers".

== Critical reception ==
JJ of TV Is My Pacifier said "“20th Century Fox Mambo” got a complete staging, and we only saw Karen auditioning the song. From what I saw about the dancing, it was very solid, but I would’ve like some shots of Ivy doing the same routine. The same counts for the singing, it would’ve been nice to have heard Megan singing the song (in part), as well." Scott Brown of Vulture describes the song as a "frothy style spread that uses [Marilyn Monroe's] early, Norma Jean–era screen test for 20th Century Fox...to blow out a number that's easily detachable from a larger story", and notes that this probable because at the point in the series, there was "no larger story, no structure, and no real concept" to the musical. He likens the song to "Under the Sea", and adds "the mambo is suitably energetic and, once again, acrobatically choreographed by Josh Bergasse". He also comments on Katharine McPhee's "much-remarked-upon blankness" in the song: "her eyes go a little dead... and her whole soul seems to wink out, as if covered by some protective nictating membrane", and adds that "the peak of the song takes her atop a spinning desk, where she looks mighty uncomfortable". He compares the makeover aspect of the song to Evita's "Rainbow High", and adds that sometimes the song was as "lyrically strained" Tim Rice's work, citing: "accenting the word 'the' to keep the rhythm, rhyming obsessively and ostentatiously, strenuously saying nothing and saying it repeatedly, and contracting words to cheat metrical death (e.g., fac'try for factory)", as ways in which "this number trades coquettishly in lyrical hedges that really push [his] buttons". He concluded by saying, "I still await a song from "Marilyn" that I can fall for, like Arthur Miller at Shiksa Mart. And I hold to my theory that said song won't arrive until somebody figures out what Marilyn is actually about. Noel Murray of The AV Club says that he "liked [the song] quite a bit", though adds in his opinion it should have been titled "The 20th Century Foxtrot". In regard to McPhee's performance, he noted that "in the studio, she hits all the notes and all the steps, but without much life", and adds that "to [him], Karen was much more appealing when she was awkwardly rehearsing the dance in her apartment, and getting embarrassed by her boyfriend Dev watching her". An Allmusic review by Heather Phares notes that "a Chicago-style brassiness dominates "The 20th Century Fox Mambo" and "Let's Be Bad," both of which sound the most like genuine show tunes".
