= Miss America's Outstanding Teen 2008 =

3rd Miss America Outstanding Teen pageant held in Orlando, Florida

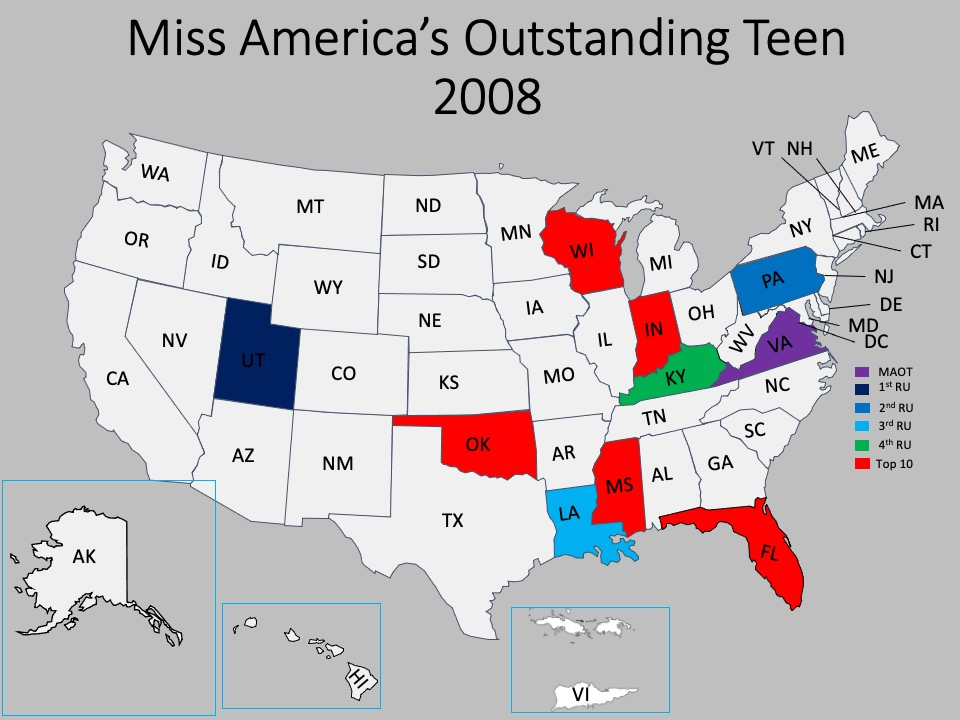
- Miss America's Outstanding Teen 2008 Participants and Results
- Date: August 11, 2007
- Presenters: Lauren Nelson; Billy Flanigan
- Venue: Linda Chapin Theater
- Entrants: 52
- Placements: 10
- Winner: Caitlin Brunell; Virginia

Miss America's Outstanding Teen 2008 was the third Miss America's Outstanding Teen pageant, held at the Linda Chapin Theater in the Orange County Convention Center in Orlando, Florida on August 11, 2007.

At the conclusion of the event, Maria DeSantis of New York crowned her successor Caitlin Brunell of Virginia. The pageant was hosted by Miss America 2007 Lauren Nelson and performer Billy Flanigan.

== Results ==
=== Placements ===
Placement	Contestant
Miss America's Outstanding Teen 2008	Virginia – Caitlin Brunell
1st Runner-Up	Utah – Lindsey Brinton
2nd Runner-Up	Pennsylvania – Elena LaQuatra
3rd Runner-Up	Louisiana – Mary Jane Hobgood
4th Runner-Up	Kentucky – Ann-Blair Thornton
Top 10	Florida – Alexandra Milbrath; Indiana – Morgan Jackson; Mississippi – Jasmine Murray; Oklahoma – Jamie Butemeyer; Wisconsin – Bishara Dorre

=== Other Awards ===
Award	Contestant(s)
Academic Achievement	Minnesota - Chantal Wilson
Non-finalist Interview	Vermont - Caroline Bright
Non-finalist Talent	Delaware - Chelsea Betts
Preliminary Evening Wear/OSQ	Illinois - MerrieBeth Cox; Pennsylvania - Elena LaQuatra; Virginia - Caitlin Brunell
Preliminary Lifestyle and Fitness	Tennessee - Devin Grissom; Utah - Lindsey Brinton; Wisconsin - Bishara Dorre
Preliminary Talent	Delaware - Chelsea Betts; Illinois - MerrieBeth Cox; Louisiana - Mary Jane Hobgood
Spirit of America	Nebraska - Kayla Batt
Troy Scholarship	Kentucky - Ann-Blair Thornton

== Order of Announcement ==
=== Top 10 ===
1. Louisiana
2. Oklahoma
3. Wisconsin
4. Utah
5. Florida
6. Pennsylvania
7. Mississippi
8. Virginia
9. Kentucky
10. Indiana

=== Top 5 ===
1. Virginia
2. Utah
3. Louisiana
4. Kentucky
5. Pennsylvania

== Pageant ==
=== Selection of Contestants ===
One delegate from each state, District of Columbia, and the Virgin Islands were chosen in state pageants held between September 2006 to July 2007.

=== Preliminaries ===
During the 4 days prior to the final night, the delegates compete in the preliminary competition, which includes a private interview with the judges and a show where they compete in talent, evening wear, lifestyle and fitness in athletic wear, and on-stage question. They were held August 7–10, 2007.

=== Finals ===
During the finals, the top 10 compete in evening wear, lifestyle and fitness in athletic wear, and talent, and the top 5 compete in on-stage question.

== Contestants ==
52 delegates participated:

State	Name	Hometown	Age	Local Title	Talent	Placement	Awards	Notes
Alabama	Meg McGuffin	Ozark	14	Miss Teen Trojan/Troy	Jazz Dance en Pointe			Later Miss Alabama 2015; 4th runner-up at Miss America 2016 pageant
Alaska	Avianna McKee	Anchorage	17		Neo-Classical Ballet en Pointe			
Arizona	Danielle Dastrup	Holbrook	16	Miss Teen Navajo County	Vocal			
Arkansas	Morgan Holt	Conway	16	Miss Teen Conway	Tap Dance			1st runner-up at Miss Arkansas 2012 pageant
California	Jordan Krinke	Placentia	16	Miss Teen Placentia	Dance			Later National Sweetheart 2013
Colorado	Paige Story	Parker						
Connecticut	Karen Link	Terryville		Miss Bristol's Outstanding Teen	Spanish-influenced tap dance			Former NFL cheerleader and captain for the New England Patriots
Delaware	Chelsea Betts	Georgetown	15	Miss Sussex County's Outstanding Teen	Vocal		Non-finalist Talent Award Preliminary Talent Award	
(Washington, D.C.) District of Columbia	LaTonya Abrams	Washington D.C.						
Florida	Alexandra Milbrath	Winter Park	15	Miss City Beautiful's Outstanding Teen				
(Georgia (U.S. state)) Georgia	Michaela Lackey	Marietta	17	Miss Cobb County's Outstanding Teen	Ballet en Pointe			Later Miss Georgia 2011
Hawaii	Moani Hara	Honolulu						
Idaho	Cassidy Bronson	Ammon	14		Vocal			
Illinois	MerrieBeth Cox	Roselle	16	Miss Greater Woodville's Outstanding Teen	Baton Twirling		Preliminary Evening Wear/OSQ Award Preliminary Talent Award	Later Purdue University's 27th Golden Girl Later Miss Indiana 2012; Top 12 at Miss America 2013 pageant
Indiana	Morgan Jackson	Charlestown	13	Miss Harvest Homecoming's Outstanding Teen	Dance	Top 10		Daughter of Miss New Mexico 1984, Trina Collins Later Miss Indiana 2015
Iowa	Taylar Swartz	Fremont	16	Miss Southern Iowa's Outstanding Teen				
Kansas	Maggie Delaney	Overland Park	17	Miss Johnson County's Outstanding Teen	Vocal			
Kentucky	Ann-Blair Thornton	Bowling Green	17	Miss Elizabethtown Area's Outstanding Teen		4th runner-up		1st runner-up at National Sweetheart 2010 pageant Later Miss Kentucky 2011
Louisiana	Mary Jane Hobgood	Shreveport		Miss Holiday in Dixie's Outstanding Teen	Ballet en Pointe, Rodeo by Aaron Copland	3rd runner-up	Preliminary Talent Award	
Maine	Erin Buck	Caribou	15		Vocal			Later Maine's Junior Miss 2010
Maryland	Kasey Stanizewski	Swan Point	15	Miss College Park's Outstanding Teen	Vocal			Sister of Miss Maryland 2010, Lindsay Staniszewski Triple Crown Winner: Later Miss Maryland Teen USA 2009; 3rd runner-up at Miss Teen USA 2009 pageant; Later Miss Maryland USA 2013; Top 15 at Miss USA 2013 pageant
Massachusetts	Hillary Pavao	Dartmouth						
Michigan	Madelynne Wagner	Rockford						
Minnesota	Chantal Wilson	Greenbush	16		Piano		Academic Achievement Award	1st runner-up at Miss Minnesota 2014 pageant
Mississippi	Jasmine Murray	Columbia		Miss Houston/North Central's Outstanding Teen	Vocal	Top 10		Top 13 finalist on season 8 of American Idol Later Miss Mississippi 2014; Top 10 at Miss America 2015 pageant
Missouri	Mary Bauer	Cape Girardeau	16	Miss Maulden's Outstanding Teen	Vocal, "Popular" from Wicked			4th runner-up at Miss Missouri 2009 pageant
Montana	Chantell Bury	Glendive	16		Vocal			3rd runner-up at Miss Montana 2009 and 2013 pageants
Nebraska	Kayla Batt	Alliance			Vocal		Spirit of America Award	Top 10 at National Sweetheart 2010 pageant Later Miss Nebraska 2011
Nevada	Gabrielle Boyadjian	Las Vegas	14		Vocal			
New Hampshire	Julia Neveu	Manchester	17		Jazz Dance			3rd runner-up at Miss New Hampshire 2012 pageant 4th runner-up at Miss New Hampshire 2013 pageant
New Jersey	Kaitlyn Schoeffel	Egg Harbor Township	13	Miss Coastal Shore's Outstanding Teen	Dance			Later Miss New Jersey 2017; 2nd runner-up at Miss America 2018
New Mexico	Madison Tabet	Albuquerque	15		Dance			Later Miss New Mexico 2010
(New York (state)) New York	Allison Carlos	Watertown	15	Miss Adirondack International Speedway's Outstanding Teen	Dance			
North Carolina	BrieAnna Hester	Henderson	16	Miss Central Carolina's Outstanding Teen	Lyrical Dance			4th runner-up at Miss North Carolina 2013 pageant
North Dakota	Andrea Berglund	Bismarck	16	Teen Miss Northern Lights				
Ohio	Ashley Miller	Patriot	16	Miss Portsmouth's Outstanding Teen				
Oklahoma	Jamie Butemeyer	Lawton	16	Miss South OKC's Outstanding Teen		Top 10		
Oregon	Abigail Rodriguez	Gresham	16	Miss Portland's Outstanding Teen				Born drug-addicted to addict parents and was later adopted
Pennsylvania	Elena LaQuatra	Mount Lebanon	15	Miss Central Pennsylvania's Outstanding Teen	Tap Dance, "You Can't Stop the Beat" from Hairspray	2nd runner-up	Preliminary Evening Wear/OSQ Award	Deaf since age 4 due to bacterial meningitis Later Miss Pennsylvania Teen USA 2010 Later Miss Pennsylvania USA 2016
Rhode Island	Molly Jacobson	Barrington						Previously Miss Teen Rhode Island International 2006
South Carolina	Lauren Lytle	Boiling Springs	17	Miss Greenville Teen	Vocal			
South Dakota	Autumn Simunek	Hot Springs	14		Ballet			Contestant at National Sweetheart 2012 pageant Later Miss South Dakota 2015
Tennessee	Devin Grissom	Cordova	16	Miss Cordova's Outstanding Teen	Vocal		Preliminary Lifestyle and Fitness Award	Appeared on season 1 of CMT's Sweet Home Alabama
Texas	Callie Thompson	Katy	17	Miss Teen Montgomery County	Jazz Dance			4th runner-up at Miss Texas 2013 pageant
Utah	Lindsey Brinton	Salt Lake City	16			1st runner-up	Preliminary Lifestyle and Fitness Award	Later America's Junior Miss 2008
Vermont	Caroline Bright	St. Albans	17		Vocal		Non-finalist Interview Award	Later Miss Vermont 2010
Virginia	Caitlin Brunell	Great Falls	15	Miss Greater Richmond's Outstanding Teen	En Pointe Dance, "Show Off" from The Drowsy Chaperone	Winner	Preliminary Evening Wear/OSQ Award	Daughter of former New Orleans Saints quarterback, Mark Brunell Later Miss Alabama 2014; Top 10 at Miss America 2015 pageant
(United States Virgin Islands) Virgin Islands	Reisha Alyssa Corneiro	Saint Croix						
(Washington (state)) Washington	Genay Tucker	Vancouver	16	Miss Greater Vancouver's Outstanding Teen	Tap Dance			
West Virginia	Courtney Nelson	Keyser		Miss Teen Eastern Panhandle	Vocal, “Wishing You Were Somehow Here Again” from The Phantom of the Opera			
Wisconsin	Bishara Dorre	Milwaukee	17	Miss Milwaukee's Outstanding Teen	Dance	Top 10	Preliminary Lifestyle and Fitness Award	Previously Miss Wisconsin Teen USA 2006; Previously National American Miss 2010 Later Miss Wisconsin USA 2014; Top 10 at Miss USA 2014 pageant
Wyoming	Ashley Golden	Gillette	13	Miss Campbell County's Outstanding Teen				
