= Miss America's Outstanding Teen 2020 =

American teen pageant

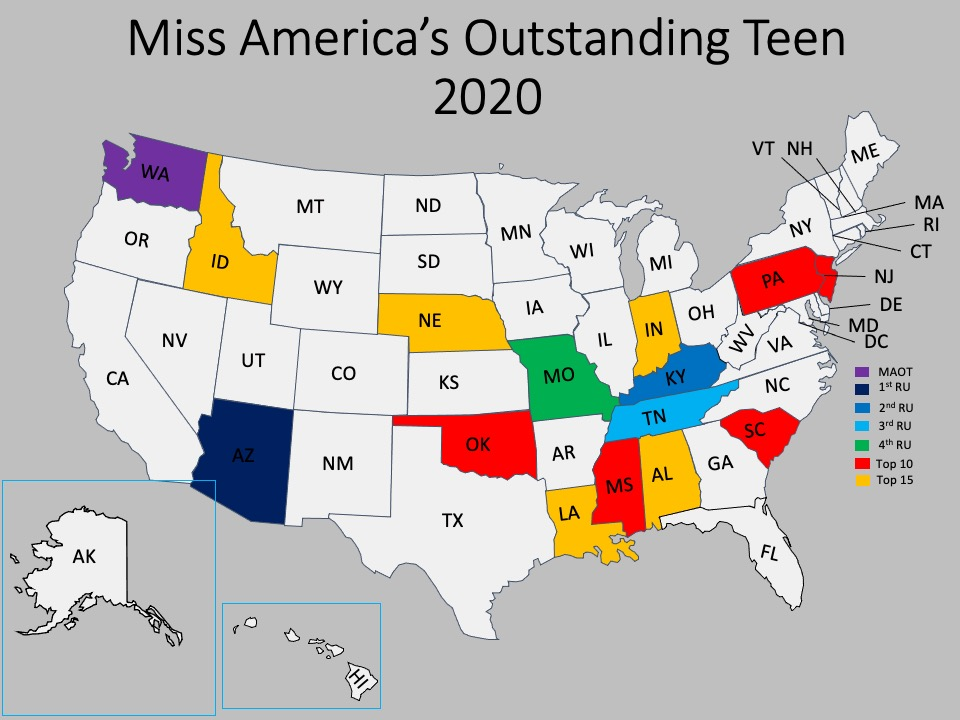
- Date: July 27, 2019
- Presenters: Mike Rome
- Venue: Linda Chapin Theater, Orlando, Florida, United States
- Entrants: 51
- Placements: 15
- Winner: Payton Kennedy May; Washington

Miss America's Outstanding Teen 2020 was the 14th annual Miss America's Outstanding Teen pageant held in Orlando, Florida on July 27, 2019. The preliminary competition was held on July 23–25, 2019.

London Hibbs of Texas crowned her successor, Payton May of Washington, at the end of the event.

== Judges ==
The panel of judges for the 2020 preliminary and final night of competition will include:

- Caitlin Brunell-Moore, Miss America's Outstanding Teen 2008 and Miss Alabama 2014
- Willie L. Hill, Jr., Director of the Fine Arts Center at the University of Massachusetts Amherst
- Margot Menzel, talent manager at Luber Roklin Entertainment
- Susan Davis Baldino, professor of museum studies at Florida State University and disabilities advocate
- Candace M. Read, wardrobe stylist and blogger
- Jeffrey C. McDermott, President/CEO of Center for the Performing Arts in Carmel, Indiana

== Results ==
=== Placements ===
Placement	Contestant
Miss America's Outstanding Teen 2020	Washington – Payton May
1st runner-up	Arizona – Katelyn Cai
2nd runner-up	Kentucky – Landry Feldmeier
3rd runner-up	Tennessee – Taylor Parsons
4th runner-up	Missouri – Shae Smith
Top 10	Mississippi – Jane Granberry; New Jersey – Brynn McKinney; Oklahoma – Claire Grace; Pennsylvania – Riley Evans; South Carolina – Kellan Fenegan
Top 15	Alabama – Zoé Champion; Idaho – Kaila Yacuk §; Indiana – Hadley Abram; Louisiana – Chanley Patterson; Nebraska – Phoenix Stanford

§ America's Choice

=== Top 15 ===
1. Indiana
2. Missouri
3. New Jersey
4. Alabama
5. Kentucky
6. Oklahoma
7. Louisiana
8. Mississippi
9. South Carolina
10. Arizona
11. Washington
12. Tennessee
13. Nebraska
14. Pennsylvania
15. Idaho

=== Top 10 ===
1. South Carolina
2. New Jersey
3. Arizona
4. Mississippi
5. Missouri
6. Oklahoma
7. Pennsylvania
8. Washington
9. Kentucky
10. Tennessee

=== Top 5 ===
1. Missouri
2. Tennessee
3. Arizona
4. Kentucky
5. Washington

=== Awards ===
==== Preliminary awards ====
Award	Contestants
Preliminary Evening Wear/On-Stage Question (OSQ)	Alabama – Zoé Champion; Arizona – Katelyn Cai; (Washington (state)) Washington – Payton May
Preliminary Talent	Missouri – Shae Smith; Pennsylvania – Riley Evans; Tennessee – Taylor Parsons

==== Talent awards ====
Awards	Contestant(s)
Overall Dance	Pennsylvania – Riley Evans; Tennessee – Taylor Parsons
Overall Instrumental	Louisiana – Chanley Patterson; Utah – Claire Inouye
Overall Vocal	Texas – Allie Graves

==== Other awards ====
Awards	Contestant(s)
America's Choice	Idaho – Kaila Yacuk
Children's Miracle Network (CMN) Miracle Maker Award	Missouri – Shae Smith
Miss Congeniality/Spirit of America	Alabama – Zoé Champion
Outstanding Achievement in Academic Life	Arizona – Katelyn Cai
Non-finalist Evening Wear/On-Stage Question (OSQ)	Rhode Island – Caroline Parente
Non-finalist Interview	Illinois – Imani Muse
Non-finalist Talent	Texas – Allie Graves
Random Acts of Kindness	Utah – Claire Inouye
Scholastic Excellence	South Carolina – Kellan Fenegan
Teens in Action Award Winners	Delaware – Jacqueline Means (tie); Florida – Hannah Adams (tie)
Teens in Action Award Finalists	Massachusetts – Rachel Michelle-Marie Perry; Oklahoma – Claire Grace; South Carolina – Kellan Fenegan; Virginia – Morgan Rhudy
Top Advertisement Sales Media Scholarship	Texas – Allie Graves

== Contestants ==
The Miss America's Outstanding Teen 2020 contestants are:

- Declared as winner
- Ended as a runner-up
- Ended as a finalist or semi-finalist

State	Name	Age	Hometown	Talent	Placement	Award(s)	Notes
Alabama	Zoé Champion	16	Leeds	Jazz Dance, "Lone Ranger"	Top 15	Preliminary Evening Gown/OSQ Award Spirit of America Award	Younger sister of Miss Alabama 2013, Chandler Champion
Alaska	Corinne Johnson	16	Anchorage	Vocal, "Never Enough"			
Arizona	Katelyn Cai	15	Scottsdale	Lyrical Dance, "You Say"	1st Runner-up	Outstanding Achievement in Academic Life Preliminary Evening Gown/OSQ Award Top 5 Interview	First Chinese-American crowned Miss Arizona's Outstanding Teen Later Distinguished Young Woman of America 2022
Arkansas	Sarah Cate Lay	16	North Little Rock	Tap Dance, "Shout"			
California	Isabella Mills	15	San Francisco	Ballet en Pointe, "Tambourine Variation"			
Colorado	Natalie Orsborn	17	Brighton	Acrobatic Dance, "The Way I Am"			Younger sister of Miss Colorado's Outstanding Teen 2009, Janelle Orsborn
Connecticut	Lindiana Frangu	15	Woodbury	Rhythmic Tap Dance, "Cold Hearted"			
Delaware	Jacqueline Means	16	Wilmington	Acro-Jazz Fusion Dance, "Circle of Life" & "Wanna Be Startin' Somethin'"		Teens in Action Award Winner (tie)	Founder of Wilmington Urban STEM Initiative
(Washington, D.C.) District of Columbia	Kianna Kelly-Futch	17	Washington D.C.	Vocal, "Home"			
Florida	Hannah Adams	15	Jacksonville	Contemporary Pointe Dance, Queen Medley		Teens in Action Award Winner (tie)	Older sister of Miss Alabama's Outstanding Teen 2022, Hailey Adams
(Georgia (U.S. state)) Georgia	Mary Wilhelmina Hodges	14	Louisville	Tap Dance, "Boogie Shoes"			
Hawaii	Makaila Natividad	15	Kapolei	Lyrical Dance, "Carry You"			
Idaho	Kaila Yacuk	17	Eagle	Contemporary Dance, "Anything's Possible"	Top 15	America's Choice	
Illinois	Imani P. Muse	16	Illinois City	Vocal, "The Impossible Dream"		Non-finalist Interview Award	First African-American to be crowned Miss Illinois' Outstanding Teen
Indiana	Hadley Abram	17	Bloomington	Musical Theater Jazz Dance, "Let's Be Bad"	Top 15		
Iowa	Caitlin Crome	17	Bettendorf	Jazz Dance, "That's Life"			
Kansas	Tori Pedruzzi	14	Wichita	Lyrical Dance, "Ashes"		Miracle Maker Runner-up	
Kentucky	Landry Feldmeier	15	Louisville	Tap Dance, "Woman Up"	2nd Runner-up		
Louisiana	Chanley Patterson	16	Ruston	Piano, "El Cumbanchero"	Top 15	Overall Instrumental Talent Award	
Maine	Jane Lipp	16	New Gloucester	Vocal, "Imagine"			
Maryland	Emily Yi	17	Frederick	Jazz Dance, "Show Off"			
Massachusetts	Rachel Michelle-Marie Perry	17	New Bedford	Rock Fiddle, "Walk This Way"		Teens in Action Award Finalist	
Michigan	Madison McElvany	16	Monroe	Contemporary Dance, "Sarajevo"			
Minnesota	Rachel Luchsinger	16	Woodbury	Piano, "Don't Stop Me Now"			
Mississippi	Jane Granberry	16	Hattiesburg	Jazz Dance, "River Deep - Mountain High"	Top 10		Later Miss Mississippi 2026
Missouri	Shae Smith	15	Bolivar	Jazz Dance, "September"	4th Runner-up	CMN Miracle Maker Award Preliminary Talent Award	Previously Miss Missouri Jr High School America 2016 Later Miss Missouri Teen USA 2022 Later Miss Missouri USA 2025
Montana	Karsen Murphy	17	Glendive	Lyrical Dance, "Uphill Battle"			
Nebraska	Phoenix Stanford	15	Papillion	Vocal, "Dream On"	Top 15		First Asian-American to win Miss Nebraska's Outstanding Teen
Nevada	Molly Martin	16	Henderson	Vocal, "Astonishing"			Daughter of Miss Texas 1983, Dana Rogers Martin
New Hampshire	Abigail Conard	15	Amherst	Broadway Jazz Dance, "I Am What I Am"			
New Jersey	Brynn McKinney	15	Sewell	Vocal, "Don't Rain on My Parade"	Top 10		
New Mexico	Brynn Ayala	15	Albuquerque	Jazz Dance, "A Little Party Never Killed Nobody"			
(New York (state)) New York	Sarah Lawrence	17	Eltingville	Contemporary Jazz Dance, "Keeping Your Head Up"			
North Carolina	Karlee Sanderford	16	Wendell	Jazz Dance, "Proud Mary"			
North Dakota	Kaylee Moss	15	Williston	Lyrical Dance, "Speechless"			
Ohio	Madison DeFrank	18	New Albany	Vocal, "Rise Up"			Previously auditioned for American Idol and The Voice Older sister of Miss California's Outstanding Teen 2022, Olivia DeFrank
Oklahoma	Claire Grace	17	Stillwater	Vocal, "The Girl in 14G"	Top 10	Teens in Action Award Finalist	
Oregon	Marin Gray	14	Roseburg	Ballet with Fan Veil, "Fire Dance"			Previously Miss Oregon Jr High School America 2017
Pennsylvania	Riley Evans	16	Pittsburgh	Acrobatic Jazz Dance, "The Greatest Show"	Top 10	Preliminary Talent Award	
Rhode Island	Caroline Parente	16	South Kingstown	Musical Theater Vocal, "All Falls Down"		Non-finalist Evening Wear/OSQ Award	Later Miss Rhode Island 2024 4th Runner-up at Miss America 2024
South Carolina	Kellan Fenegan	16	Lexington	Vocal, "In My Dreams"	Top 10	Scholastic Excellence Award Teens in Action Award Finalist	
South Dakota	Payton Steffensen	16	Yankton	Acrobatic Musical Theater Dance, "Call Me Back"			
Tennessee	Taylor Parsons	16	Mountain City	Clogging, "The Devil Went Down to Georgia"	3rd Runner-up	Overall Dance Talent Award Preliminary Talent Award	
Texas	Allie Graves	17	Texarkana	Vocal, "Tomorrow"		Non-finalist Talent Award Overall Vocal Talent Award Top Advertisement Sales Media Award	
Utah	Claire Inouye	16	Orem	Piano, "Hungarian Rhapsody No. 6"		Outstanding Instrument Talent Award Random Acts of Kindness Award	
Vermont	Danielle Trottier	17	Barre	Jazz Dance, "Gold"			
Virginia	Morgan Rhudy	17	Midlothian	Vocal, "My Strongest Suit"		Teens in Action Award Finalist	
(Washington (state)) Washington	Payton May	17	Vancouver	Vocal, "Over the Rainbow"	Winner	Preliminary Evening Wear/OSQ Award	
West Virginia	Lauren Rose	16	Morgantown	Lyrical Dance, "A Million Dreams"			
Wisconsin	Savannah Horstman	17	Onalaska	Vocal, "Finding Wonderland"			Older sister of Miss Wisconsin's Teen 2023, Trinity Horstman
Wyoming	Hannah Moore	17	Rock Springs	Contemporary Lyrical Dance			
