= Miss America 1954 =

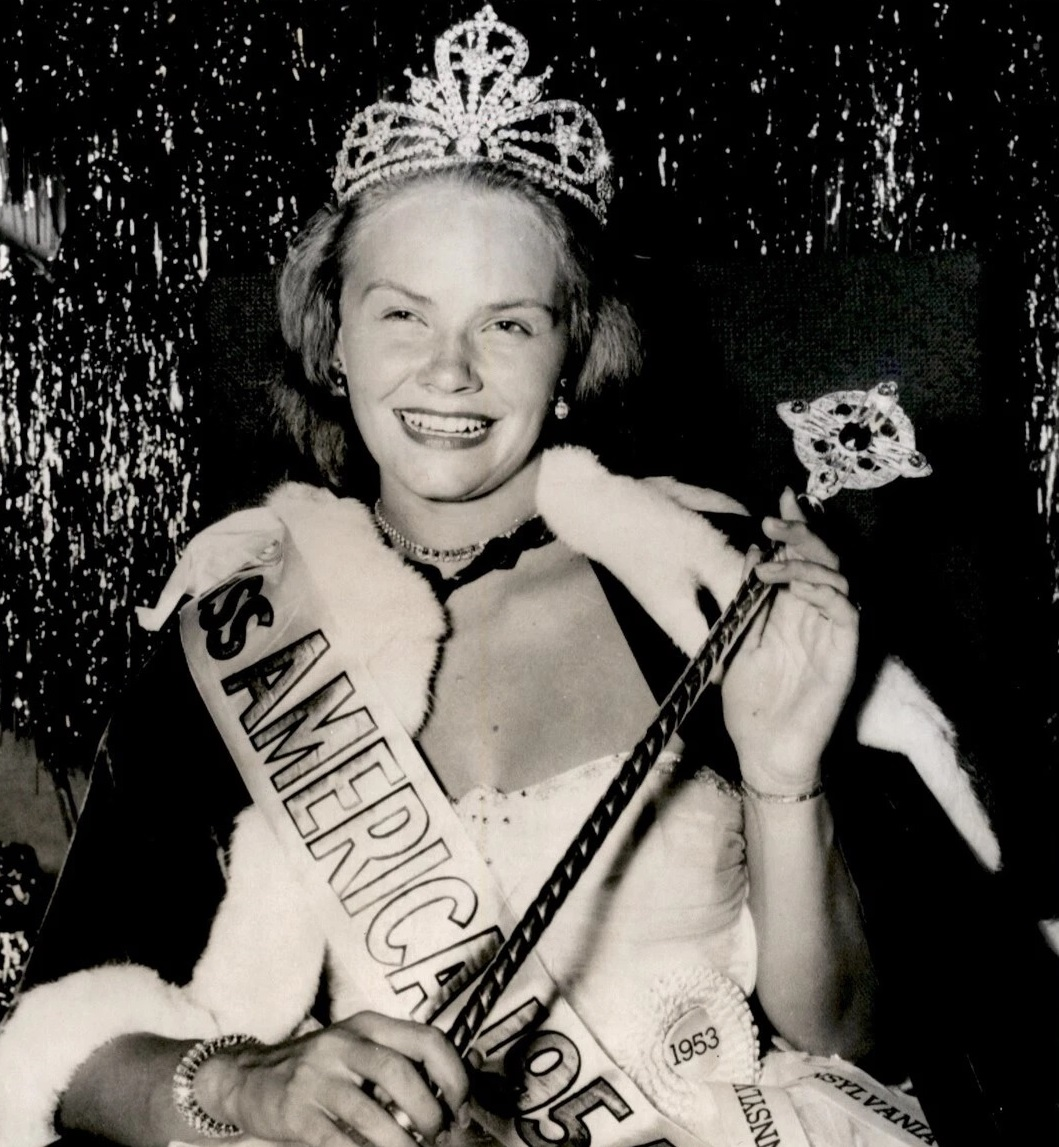
- Date: September 12, 1953
- Venue: Boardwalk Hall, Atlantic City, New Jersey
- Entrants: 52
- Placements: 10
- Winner: Evelyn Ay; Pennsylvania
- Congeniality: Patricia Ann Condon (New Jersey)

Miss America 1954, the 27th Miss America pageant, was held at the Boardwalk Hall in Atlantic City, New Jersey on September 12, 1953. Though four women from Pennsylvania had previously held the title (1924, 1935, 1936, 1940), Evelyn Ay was the first Miss Pennsylvania to be crowned Miss America, as the others represented cities.

Actress and princess-to-be Grace Kelly was one of the year's judges.

A Top 10 finisher in the pageant, Miriam Stevenson, subsequently won the 1954 Miss USA pageant, representing South Carolina. She then proceeded to be crowned Miss Universe 1954.

Similarly, Carlene King Johnson, unsuccessful as Miss Vermont in the 1954 Miss America pageant, became Miss USA 1955.

== Results ==
=== Placements ===
Placement	Contestant
Miss America 1954	Pennsylvania – Evelyn Ay
1st Runner-Up	New York City – Joan Kaible
2nd Runner-Up	Virginia – Anne Lee Ceglis
3rd Runner-Up	Alabama – Virginia McDavid
4th Runner-Up	Mississippi – Susanne Dugger
Top 10	California – Patricia Ann Johns; Delaware – Lois Ann Alava; Oregon – Patti Elaine Throop; South Carolina – Miriam Stevenson; Wyoming – Elaine Lois Holkenbrink

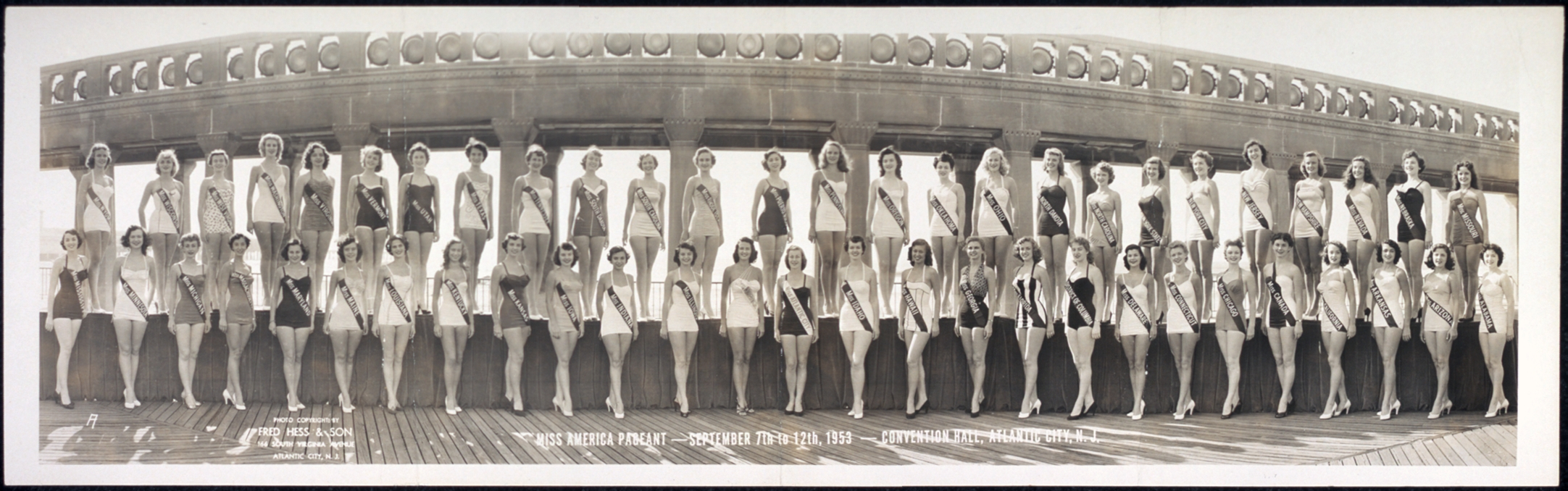
Contestants of the Miss America 1954 swimsuit competition, held during September 1953

=== Awards ===
==== Preliminary awards ====
Awards	Contestant
Lifestyle and Fitness	California - Patricia Ann Johns; Pennsylvania - Evelyn Ay; Wyoming - Elaine Lois Holkenbrink
Talent	Delaware - Lois Ann Alava; South Dakota - Delores Jerde; Virginia - Anne Lee Ceglis

==== Other awards ====
Awards	Contestant
Miss Congeniality	New Jersey - Patricia Ann Condon
Non-finalist Talent	South Dakota - Delores Jerde

== Contestants ==
State	Name	Hometown	Age	Talent	Placement	Awards	Notes
Alabama	Virginia McDavid	Birmingham	18	Monologue, "Tara" from Gone with the Wind	3rd runner-up		
Arizona	Betty Lou Lindly	Tempe		Piano			
Arkansas	Helen Reed	Fayetteville		Tap Dance			
California	Patricia Johns	Fresno		Dramatic Monologue from The Country Girl	Top 10	Preliminary Lifestyle & Fitness Award	
Canada	Kathleen "Kathy" Ann Archibald	Kelowna					
Chicago	Carol Segermark	Chicago		Vocal			
Colorado	Mary Donclan	Keenesburg		Dramatic Monologue from Of Mice and Men			
Connecticut	Sally Middleton	Hartford		Dance			
Delaware	Lois Anne Alava	Wilmington		Piano, "Concerto in A Minor"	Top 10	Preliminary Talent Award	
(Washington, D.C.) District of Columbia	Helen Smith	Washington, D.C.	19	Dance			
Florida	Marjorie Simmons	Tampa		Dance, "Slaughter on Tenth Avenue"			
(Georgia (U.S. state)) Georgia	Lucia Hutchinson	Macon	22	Operatic Vocal, "Mon cœur s'oure à ta voix" & "Love is Where You Find it"			
Hawaii	Dorothy Leilani Ellis	Lihue		Hula			
Idaho	Jane Bostic	New Plymouth		Vocal, "All the Things You Are"			
Illinois	Jacquie Dumbauld	Alton		Piano/Dance			
Indiana	Violet Wratich	East Chicago		Vocal			
Iowa	Constance VerHoef	Sheldon	18	Vocal			
Kansas	Joanne Milnar	Hutchinson	23	Water Ballet			
Kentucky	Emily Rucker	Berea		Vocal			
Louisiana	Sonya Lee LeBlanc	Baton Rouge		Dance			
Maine	Karen Diane Thorsall	Portland		Vocal			
Maryland	Meta France Justice	Crisfield		Vocal, "Ave Maria"			
Massachusetts	Lois Feldman	Natick		Ballet			
Michigan	Velva Irene Robbins	Dowagiac		Speech, "Education"			
Minnesota	Idell Hulin	Minneapolis		Vocal			
Mississippi	Suzanne Dugger	Picayune		Vocal Medley & Dance, "Bill" & "Won't You Come Home Bill Bailey"	4th runner-up		
Missouri	Laura Holmes	Northwoods		Dance			
Nebraska	Diana Louise Hann	Lincoln		Art			
Nevada	Jeannine McColl	Las Vegas		Dance			
New Hampshire	Elaine Ruggles	New Castle		Vocal			
New Jersey	Patricia Condon	Maplewood		Vocal		Miss Congeniality	
(New York (state)) New York	Jeannine Bowman	Rome		Drama			
New York City	Joan Kaible	New York City		Classical Vocal, "Qual fiamma avea nel guardo" from Pagliacci	1st runner-up		
North Carolina	Barbara Crockett	Winston-Salem		Vocal, "Shine"			
North Dakota	Marilyn Wentz	Napoleon		Vocal			
Ohio	Martha Zimmerman	Salem		Drama/Piano			
Oklahoma	Lorene Washburn	Tulsa		Vocal			
Oregon	Patti Throop	Portland		Dramatic Reading, "Patterns"	Top 10		
Pennsylvania	Evelyn Ay	Ephrata	20	Poetry Recitation, "Footsteps" from Leaves from a Grass-House by Don Blanding	Winner	Preliminary Lifestyle & Fitness Award	
Puerto Rico	Nydia Power						
Rhode Island	Joyce Sandberg	Providence		Drama			Later Miss Rhode Island USA 1954
South Carolina	Miriam Stevenson	Winnsboro	20	Tap Dance	Top 10		Later Miss South Carolina USA 1954, Miss USA 1954, & Miss Universe 1954 1st Miss USA to become Miss Universe
South Dakota	Delores Jerde	Spearfish		Piano		Preliminary Talent Award Non-finalist Talent Award	
Tennessee	Ruth Ann Barker	Trenton		Vocal			
Texas	Paula Lane	Cleburne		Fashion Design & Speech			
Utah	Ina Lavon Brown	Provo		Drama			
Vermont	Carlene King Johnson	Rutland		Dance			Later Miss Vermont USA 1955, Miss USA 1955, & semi-finalist at Miss Universe 1955
Virginia	Anne Lee Ceglis	Norfolk		Classical Vocal, "Un Bel Di" from Madama Butterfly	2nd runner-up	Preliminary Talent Award	
(Washington (state)) Washington	Geraldine Lindsey	Seattle		Vocal			
West Virginia	Patricia Stewart	Pineville		Vocal & Impersonations			
Wisconsin	Judith Jacobsen	Wauwatosa	19	Vocal & Dance, "Make Believe" & "Come Back to Sorrento"			
Wyoming	Elaine Lois Holkenbrink	Torrington		Fashion Display	Top 10	Preliminary Lifestyle & Fitness Award	
