= Miss USA 1955 =

4th Miss USA pageant

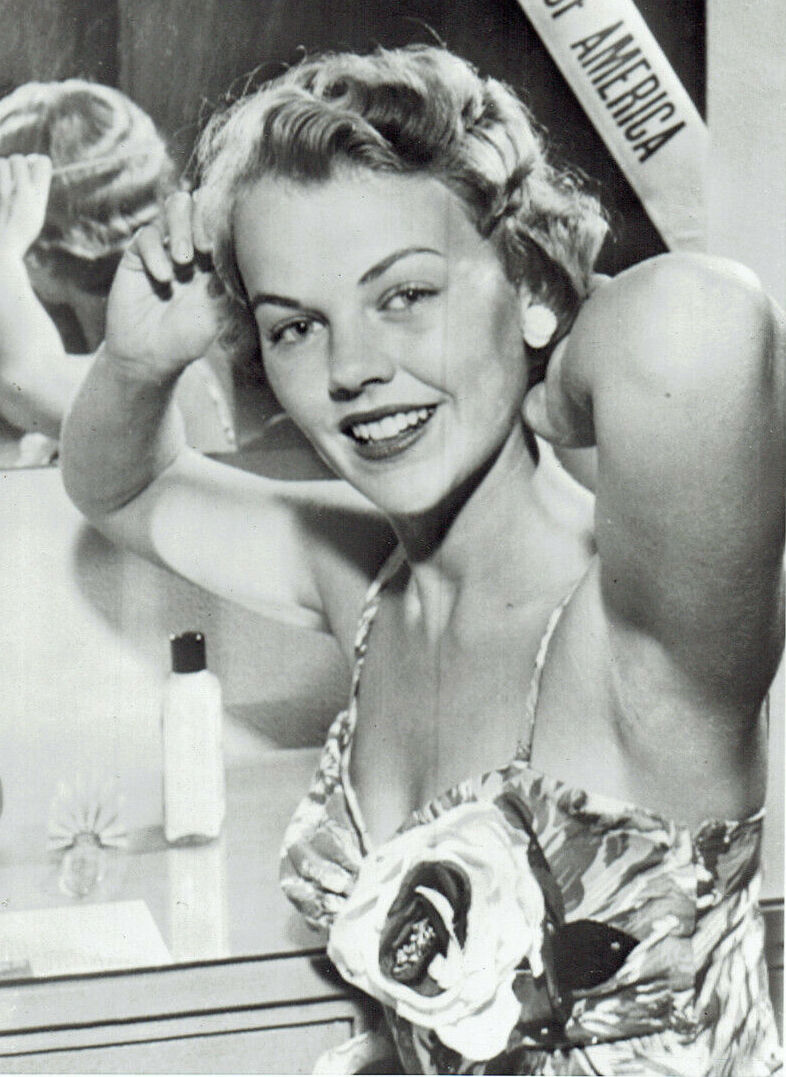
- Carlene Johnson
- Date: July 20, 1955
- Presenters: Bob Russell
- Venue: Long Beach Municipal Auditorium, Long Beach, California
- Entrants: 43
- Placements: 15
- Winner: Carlene King Johnson; Vermont

Miss USA 1955 was the fourth Miss USA pageant, held at Long Beach Municipal Auditorium, Long Beach, California on July 20, 1955.

At the end of the event, Miriam Stevenson of South Carolina crowned Carlene King Johnson of Vermont as Miss USA 1955. It is the first victory of Vermont in the pageant's history. Johnson later competed at Miss Universe and was named one of the fifteen semi-finalists.

Contestants from forty-three states and cities competed in the pageant. The competition was hosted by Bob Russell.

== Background ==
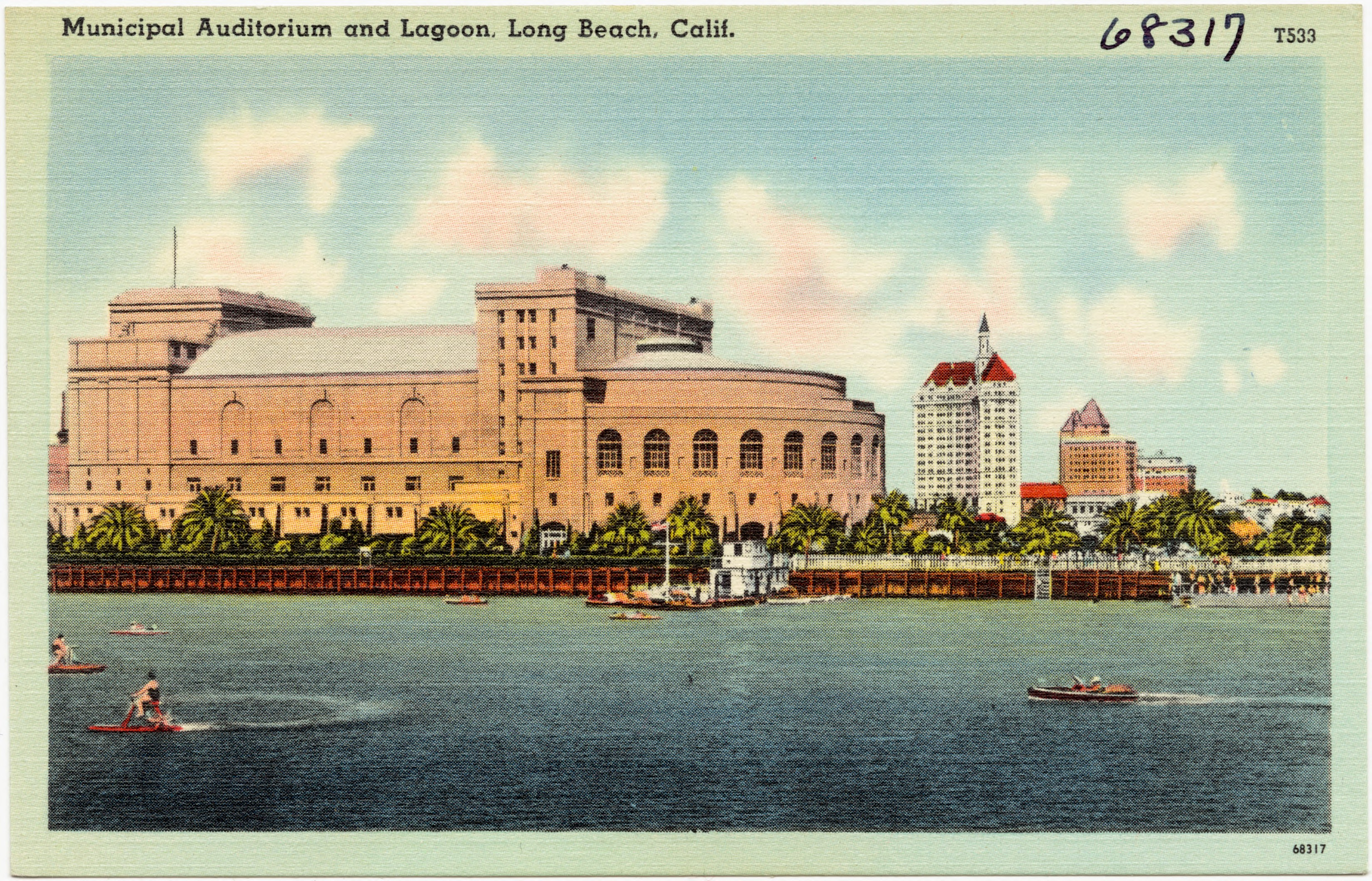
Long Beach Municipal Auditorium, the venue of Miss USA 1955

=== Selection of participants ===
Contestants from forty-three states and cities were selected to compete in the pageant. The age requirement in this edition is still from 18 to 28, where women who are married and have children can also participate.

Marianne Marcus of Pennsylvania was initially disqualified by her local organizers after competing in the wrong type of swimsuit, as a swimsuit company was sponsoring the Miss Pennsylvania USA contest. However, the decision was reversed, and Marcus was allowed to compete at Miss USA after Don D'Carlo, promoter for the Miss Pennsylvania USA contest, consulted then-executive director of the Miss Universe contest Oscar Minehardt regarding the situation, which resulted in the rule being waived.

== Results ==
=== Placements ===
Placement	Contestant
Miss USA 1955	Vermont – Carlene King Johnson
1st runner-up	Arkansas – Margaret Anne Haywood
2nd runner-up	Nebraska – Donna Streever
3rd runner-up	California – Donna Schurr
4th runner-up	Georgia – Carolann Connor
Top 15	Colorado – Dorothy Bewley; Florida – Marlies Gessler; Illinois – Diane Daniggelis; New Mexico – Joan Schwartz; New York – Janet Kadlecik; New York City – Patricia O'Kane; South Carolina – Sara Stone; Texas – Mary Daughters; Washington – Shirley Givins; Wisconsin – Jeanne Boulay

== Pageant ==
=== Format ===
From twenty-one semi-finalists in 1954, fifteen semi-finalists were chosen at the preliminary competition that consists of the swimsuit and evening gown competition. Each of the fifteen semi-finalists gave a short speech during the final telecast. Afterwards, the fifteen semi-finalists paraded again in their swimsuits and evening gowns, and the five finalists were eventually chosen.

=== Selection committee ===
- Ginny Simms – American actress and singer

== Contestants ==
Forty-three contestants competed for the title.

State/City	Contestant	Age (Note: Ages at the time of the pageant)	Hometown	Notes
Arizona	Patti Alexandria Marks	19	Glendale	
Arkansas	Margaret Anne Haywood	19	Jonesboro	Later Miss World United States 1955; 1st runner-up at Miss World 1955
California	Donna Schurr	18	Santa Ana	
Colorado	Dorothy Jean Bewley	19	Denver	
Connecticut	Jane Louise Bartolotta	23	Middletown	
Delaware	Helen Denise Blackwell	21	Wilmington	Previously Miss Delaware 1952
Florida	Mariles Gessler	20	Tallahassee	
Georgia	Carolann Connor	19	Atlanta	
Illinois	Betty Diane Daniggelis	18	Chicago	Winner of the 1955 National Press Photographers Pageant
Indiana	Mary Ann Wasick	19	Gary	
Iowa	Jerri Jean Cole	18	Holstein	
Louisiana	Merlin Grace Garcia	19	Gretna	
Maryland	Gloria Ruth King	19	Baltimore	
Massachusetts	Jean Dernago	18	Springfield	
Miami Beach, Florida	Beverly Masters	18	Miami Beach	
Michigan	Martha Smith	18	Detroit	
Minnesota	Sally Ann Colombo	18	Stillwater	
Missouri	Janet Coker	18	Caruthersville	
Nebraska	Donna Jo Streever	21	Grand Island	
New Hampshire	Patricia Ann Mowry	22	Manchester	
New Jersey	Beverly Rogers	19	Maywood	
New Mexico	Joan Schwartz	19	Albuquerque	
New York	Janet Kadlecik	18	Johnson City	
New York City, New York	Patricia Anne O'Kane	19	Valley Stream	
North Carolina	Mary Grace Ratliffe	18	Wadesboro	
North Dakota	Joan Roberta Smith	19	Bismarck	
Ohio	Carol Hagerman	20	Columbus	
Oregon	Rose Karcha	20	Salem	
Pennsylvania	Marianne Marcus	18	McKees Rocks	
Philadelphia, Pennsylvania	Doris Sommer Klein	21	Philadelphia	
Rhode Island	Beverly Jansen	20	Providence	
South Carolina	Sara Ella Stone	20	Florence	
South Dakota	Phyllis Elaine Choquette	19	Jefferson	
St. Louis, Missouri	Bennie Joan Pritchard	20	University City	
Tennessee	Barbara Gurley	24	Memphis	
Texas	Mary Miles Daughters	19	Kingsville	
Utah	Myrna Joy Rasmussen	21	Salt Lake City	
Vermont	Carlene King Johnson	22	Rutland	Top 15 at Miss Universe 1955; Previously Miss Vermont 1953
Virginia	Jeannie Asble	19	Portsmouth	
Washington	Shirley Jean Givins	20	Seattle	
West Virginia	Barbara Jean Tucker	19	St. Albans	
Wisconsin	Jeanne Marianne Bouley	19	Fond du Lac	
Wyoming	Barbara Kaye Latta	18	Casper	
