= Miss USA 1954 =

3rd Miss USA pageant

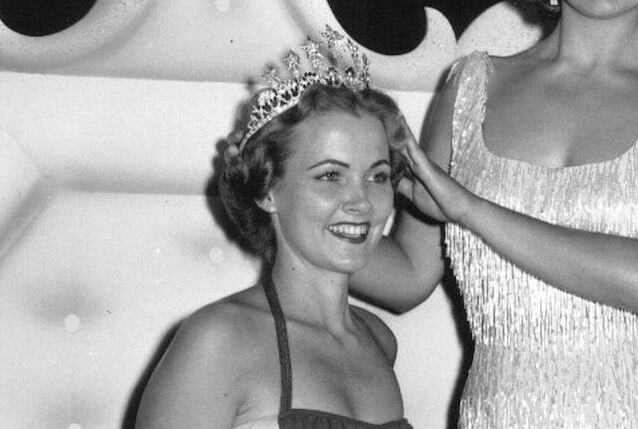
- Miriam Stevenson
- Date: July 24, 1954
- Presenters: Bob Russell
- Venue: Long Beach Municipal Auditorium, Long Beach, California
- Entrants: 45
- Placements: 21
- Winner: Miriam Stevenson; South Carolina

Miss USA 1954 was the third Miss USA pageant, held at Long Beach Municipal Auditorium, Long Beach, California on July 24, 1954.

At the end of the event, Myrna Hansen of Illinois crowned Miriam Stevenson of South Carolina as Miss USA 1954. It is the first victory of South Carolina in the pageant's history. Stevenson later competed at Miss Universe and won.

Contestants from forty-five states and cities competed in this year's pageant. The competition was hosted by Bob Russell.

== Background ==
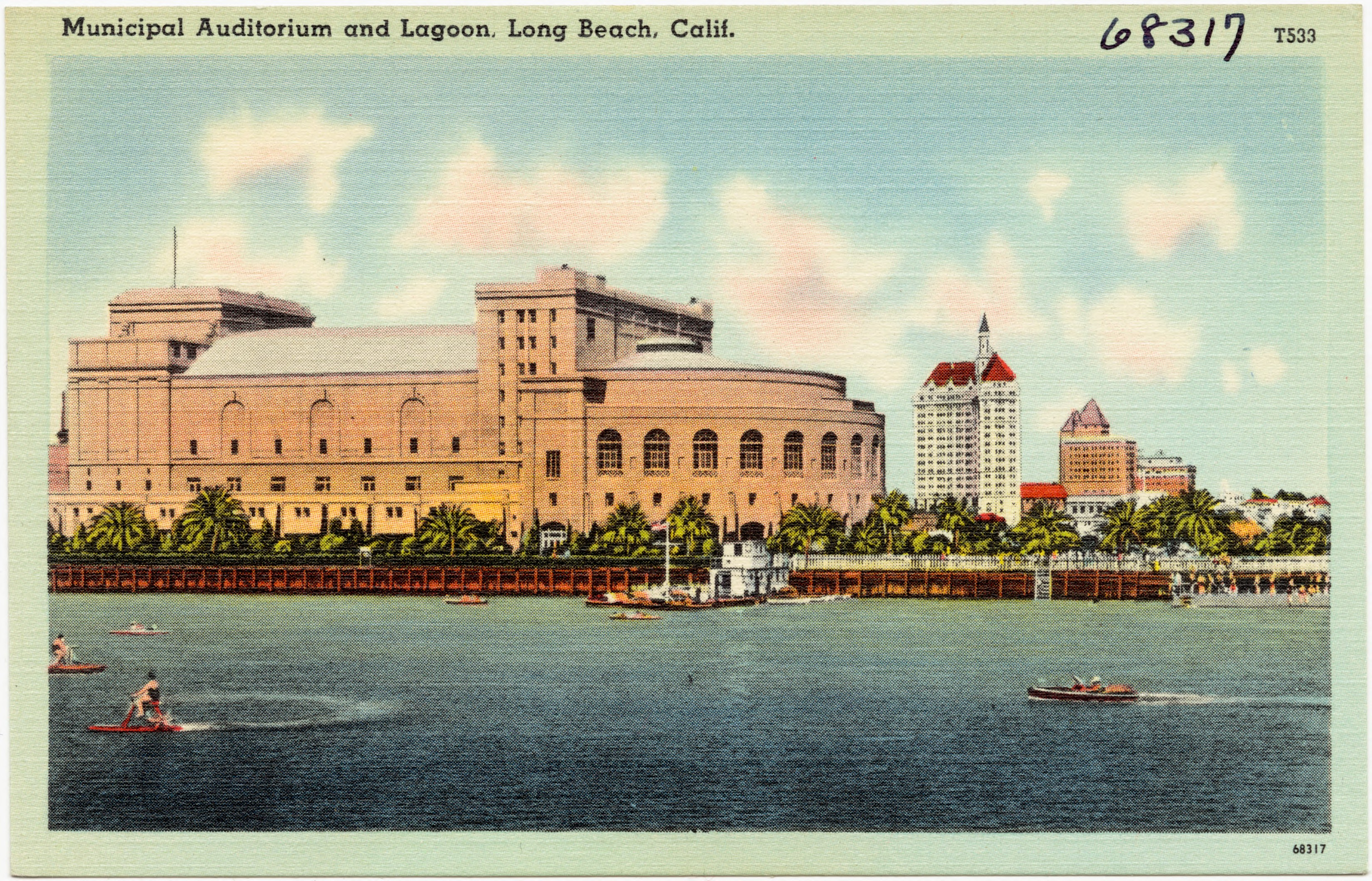
Long Beach Municipal Auditorium, the venue of Miss USA 1954

=== Selection of participants ===
Contestants from forty-five states and cities were selected to compete in the pageant. The age requirement in this edition is still from 18 to 28, where women who are married and have children can also participate. One contestant was selected to replace the original dethroned winner.

==== Replacements ====
Waydine Nesbitt, runner-up to the Arkansas Maid 1954 pageant, was appointed to replace Arkansas Maid 1954 Sonya Ann McClure after giving up her crown in order to compete for the Miss Arkansas crown for Miss America.

==== Withdrawals ====
Several contestants were disqualified due to being underaged. Barbara Ann Eschenburg of Maryland was discovered to be only 16 during the time of the contest, forcing her to withdraw as the minimum age limit of that time was 18. Ellen Whitehead of Virginia was also underage, but was discovered only after the contest. Initially, Ellen Whitehead of Virginia stayed as the first runner-up despite being underage since the placement was only considered as "honorary" according to the pageant officials. However, Dr. Richard Eschenburg, the father of Miss Maryland USA, complained to the officials as to why his daughter was disqualified for being underage while Whitehead was not; despite being underage. Whitehead was later disqualified by the pageant officials and was replaced by Karin Hultman of New York.

Elaine DuFeen of Philadelphia, Pennsylvania was expected to compete in this edition. However, DuFeen dropped out of the pageant because another girl was chosen to represent her state and thought she wouldn't get an equal chance at the competition.

== Placements ==
=== Placements ===
| Placement | Contestant |
|---|---|
| Miss USA 1954 | South Carolina – Miriam Stevenson |
| 1st runner-up | Virginia – Ellen Whitehead (disqualified) |
| 1st runner-up | New York – Karin Hultman (assumed position) |
| 2nd runner-up | New York City – Renee Roy (formerly third runner-up) |
| 3rd runner-up | Texas – Betty Lee (formerly fourth runner-up) |
| 4th runner-up | Illinois – Celeste Ravel (assumed position) |
| Top 21 | Arkansas – Waydine Nesbitt; California – Sandra Lea Constance; Connecticut – Andrea Todd; District of Columbia – Laura Farley; Indiana – Cecilia Ann Dennis; Iowa – Ione Lukens; Maryland – Barbara Ann Eschenburg; Memphis – Janice Beverly Bowles; Minnesota – Dawn Joyce; Missouri – Alice Jean Porritt; Montana – Dawn Oney; Nebraska – Margie Winkhoff; New Jersey – Evelyn Orowitz; Ohio – Barbara Joyce Randa; Wisconsin – Rita Dolores Younger |

== Pageant ==
=== Format ===
From twenty semi-finalists in 1953, twenty-one semi-finalists were chosen at the preliminary competition that consists of the swimsuit and evening gown competition. Each of the twenty semi-finalists gave a short speech during the final telecast. Afterwards, the twenty semi-finalists paraded again in their swimsuits and evening gowns, and the five finalists were eventually chosen.

== Contestants ==
Forty-five contestants competed for the title.

| State/City | Contestant | Age (Note: Ages at the time of the pageant) | Hometown | Notes |
|---|---|---|---|---|
| Arizona | Bonnie Johnson | 18 | Phoenix | |
| Arkansas | Waydine Nesbitt | 21 | Magnolia | |
| California | Sandra Constance | 18 | Los Angeles | |
| Colorado | Lorna Batterson | 19 | Denver | |
| Connecticut | Andrea Todd | 22 | Milford | |
| District of Columbia | Laura Farley | 21 | Washington, D.C. | |
| Florida | Rosemary Talucci | 22 | Miami Beach | |
| Front Royal, Virginia | Carol Hammack | – | Front Royal | |
| Illinois | Celeste Ravel | 23 | Chicago | |
| Indiana | Cecilia Dennis | 20 | Milan | |
| Iowa | Ione Lukens | – | Le Mars | |
| Kansas | Sue Ravenscroft | 18 | Liberal | |
| Kentucky | Nikki Horner | 28 | Prospect | |
| Louisiana | Sadie Vinson | 18 | New Orleans | Finalist in the 1955 Miss Dixie Pageant |
| Maryland | Barbara Ann Eschenburg | 16 | Berlin | Later disqualified for being underage |
| Massachusetts | Nan Cowan | – | Sterling | |
| Memphis, Tennessee | Janice Beverly Bowles | 18 | Memphis | |
| Michigan | Gerri Hoffman | 22 | Detroit | |
| Minnesota | Dawn Joyce | 20 | Minneapolis | |
| Missouri | Alice Jean Porritt | 19 | Cape Girardeau | |
| Montana | Dawn Oney | 22 | Billings | |
| Nebraska | Margie Winkhoff | – | Grand Island | |
| Nevada | Mary Jane Arnold | 18 | Las Vegas | |
| New Hampshire | Myrna Louise Smith | 18 | – | |
| New Jersey | Evelyn Orowitz | 20 | Collingswood | |
| New York | Karin Hultman | 22 | New York City | Became 1st runner-up after Miss Virginia USA was disqualified. Later became Miss World United States 1954; 1st runner-up at Miss World 1954 |
| New York City, New York | Renee Roy | 23 | New York City | |
| North Carolina | Ann Pickett | 22 | Charlotte | |
| North Dakota | Jane Hewitt | 19 | Fargo | |
| Ohio | Barbara Randa | 19 | Painesville | |
| Oregon | Charlotte Miller | 18 | Toledo | |
| Pennsylvania | Helen Vidovich | 18 | Beaver Valley | |
| Pleasure Beach, Connecticut | Violet Fuchs | – | – | |
| Rhode Island | Joyce Anne Sandberg | 21 | Warwick | Previously Miss Rhode Island 1953; As wife of Philip Noel, served as the First Lady of Rhode Island from 1973 to 1977. |
| South Carolina | Miriam Jacqueline Stevenson | 20 | Winnsboro | Miss Universe 1954; Previously Miss South Carolina 1953; Top 10 at Miss America 1954 |
| South Dakota | Barbara Ann Brown | – | – | |
| St. Louis, Missouri | Jo Ann Lynde | – | – | |
| Tennessee | Barbara Holly | 21 | Nashville | |
| Texas | Betty Lee | 20 | Houston | |
| Utah | Laverna Laub | 22 | Salt Lake City | |
| Vermont | Georgia Laurise | 24 | New Haven | |
| Virginia | Ellen Whitehead | 17 | Chatham | Later disqualified due to being underage |
| Washington | Darlene Shride | – | – | |
| West Virginia | Sandra Waggy | – | – | |
| Wisconsin | Rita Delores Younger | 21 | Baraboo | |
| Wyoming | Faith Radenbaugh | | Heart Mountain | |
