= Miss Vermont's Teen =

- Formation: 2005
- Type: Beauty pageant
- Location: Stowe, Vermont
- Members: Miss America's Teen
- Official language: English
- Key people: Brittany Rhoads
- Website: Official website

For the state pageant affiliated with Miss Teen USA, see Miss Vermont Teen USA

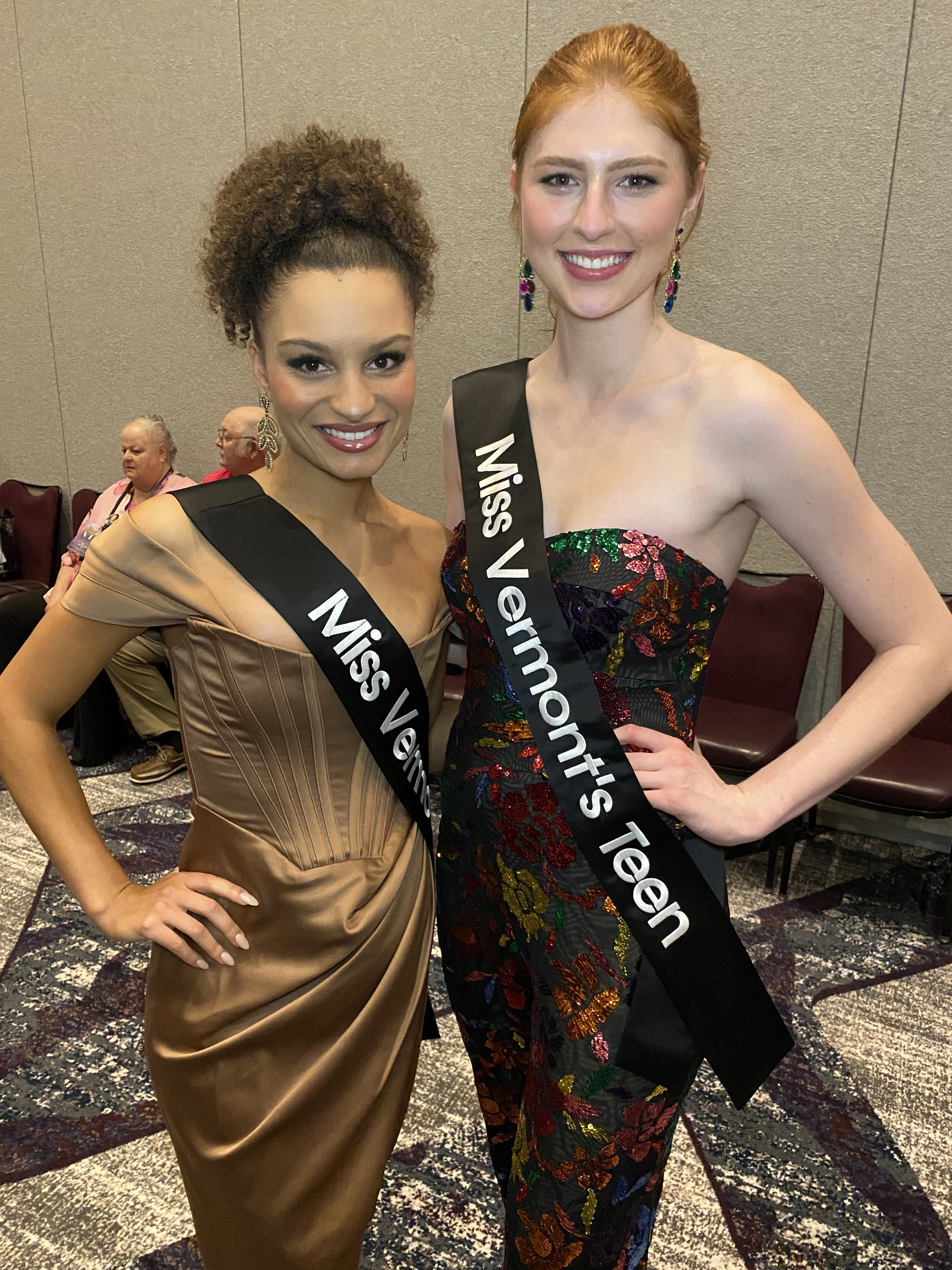
Miss Vermont 2023, Yamuna Turco and Miss Vermont's Teen 2023, Ginger Ragaishis

The Miss Vermont's Teen competition is the pageant that selects the representative for the U.S. state of Vermont in the Miss America's Teen pageant.

In January 2023, the official name of the pageant was changed from Miss Vermont's Outstanding Teen, to Miss Vermont's Teen, in accordance with the national pageant.

Zoey Clopton of Jericho was crowned Miss Vermont's Teen on April 26, 2026, at the Spruce Peak Performing Arts Center in Stowe, Vermont. She competed for the title of Miss America's Teen 2027 on September 5, 2026, at the Kravis Center for the Performing Arts in West Palm Beach, Florida.

== Results summary ==
The following is a visual summary of the past results of Miss Vermont's Teen titleholders presented in the table below. The year in parentheses indicates year of the Miss America's Teen competition in which the placement and/or award was garnered.

=== Placements ===
- Top 11: Ginger Ragaishis (2024)

=== Awards ===
==== Other awards ====
- Miss Photogenic: Alexina Federhen (2015)
- Non-finalist Interview Award: Caroline Bright (2008)
- People's Choice: Ginger Ragaishis (2024)

== Winners ==
Year	Name	Hometown	Age	Local Title	Talent	Placement at Miss America's Teen	Special scholarships at Miss America's Teen	Notes
2026	Zoey Clopton	Jericho	16	Miss Lake Champlain's Teen	Vocal			
2025	Emma Danaher	Essex	16	Miss Lake Champlain's Teen	Speed Painting			
2024	Charlee Royer	Newport	15	Miss Maple Grove's Teen	Lyrical Dance			Only winner from Orleans Country in Miss Vermont history.
2023	Ginger Ragaishis	Manchester	17	Miss Southern Vermont's Teen	Contemporary Vocal, "If I can Dream"	Top 11	People's Choice	Later Miss New York Teen USA 2025 & 4th runner-up at Miss Teen USA 2025
2022	Abagail Hunter	Poultney	17	Miss Rutland County's Outstanding Teen	Broadway Jazz, "They Just Keep Moving The Line"			4th runner-up at Miss Vermont 2024
2021	Emma Anderson	Shelburne	17	Miss Champlain Valley's Outstanding Teen	Tap Dance; "Another Day of Sun"			3rd runner-up at Miss Vermont 2023 4th runner-up at Miss Vermont 2025 1st runner-up at Miss Vermont 2026
2020	National pageant cancelled due to the coronavirus pandemic							
2019	Danielle Trottier	Barre	17		Jazz Dance, "Gold"			2nd runner up at Miss Vermont 2025, 2nd runner-up at Miss Vermont USA 2023
2018	Shannon Adams	Warren	16		Celtic Harp, "The Mad River Set"			Later Distinguished Young Woman of Vermont 2019
2017	Jenna Lawrence	St. Albans	16		Vocal, "For Good"			
2016	Alexandra Diehl	St. Albans	15		Ballet En Pointe, "Touch the Sky"			Later Miss Vermont Teen USA 2018
2015	Sophia Parker	Addison	16		Spoken Word Poetry			Later Miss Vermont 2025
2014	Alexina Federhen	Bennington	17		Vocal		Miss Photogenic	Previously Miss Vermont High School America 2013 1st runner-up at Miss Vermont Teen USA 2016 pageant Later Miss Vermont 2022
2013	Chloe Johnson	Fairfield	17		Ballet En Pointe			Later crowned Miss Santa Clara 2020–2021 in California. Resigned February 22, 2021
2012	Caroline Jones	Shelburne	16		Theatrical Fencing Demonstration			
2011	Sophia Hadeka	Fair Haven	13		Lyrical Dance			Later Miss Vermont Teen USA 2013 Later Distinguished Young Woman of Vermont 2016
2010	Erin Connor	Bridport	15		ASL Song Interpretation			Later Miss Vermont 2017
2009	Sarah Cramton	Thetford	17		Vocal, "America the Beautiful"			
2008	Blaize Hall	Georgia	15		Vocal			
2007	Caroline Bright	St. Albans	17		Vocal		Non-finalist Interview Award	Later Miss Vermont 2010
2006	Heather Bartlett	Jericho	16		Classical Vocal			
2005	Brittany Rhoads	Jericho	17		Musical Theater Vocal			
