= Barbara West (TV news anchor) =

American television journalist

- Born: Barbara Schmitt; 1948 (age 77–78)
- Education: University of Vermont
- Occupations: TV journalist, news anchor
- Beauty pageant titleholder
- Title: Miss Vermont 1969; Miss University of Vermont 1969
- Hair color: Blonde
- Eye color: Brown
- Major competition: Miss America 1970

Barbara West (née Schmitt; born 1948) is an American television journalist and former news anchor for WFTV in Orlando, Florida. She and her husband have now organized a not-for-profit foundation that raises significant amounts of money for leading hospitals, animal shelters, hospices, educational institutions and other charitable organizations across the country.

== Personal information ==
West attended the University of Vermont and obtained a Master's degree. While there, she won the 1969 Miss Vermont contest and was selected to represent her state in the national Miss America competition. Before starting her career in television news, she was an assistant professor at the university.

West's husband Wade West is a former political strategist for both Democrats and Republicans, including presidential cabinet members and the Bush and Clinton administrations.

== Journalism career ==
West was principal assistant to Peter Jennings while he was anchor for ABC's World News Tonight in London. She helped cover such stories as the Royal Wedding of Charles and Diana and the Iranian Hostage Crisis. Since 1992 she has served as health reporter and anchor for Orlando's WFTV news at noon and 5:30. As a health reporter she traveled to Canada to report on its health care system and to Ukraine to report on the tenth anniversary of the Chernobyl disaster and its health effects. She received the 2002 Summit Award for Community service from Central Florida Women's Resource Center and an Emmy for her reporting on women fighting breast cancer. On her official biography page on WFTV.com, she lists her first two specific accomplishments as covering the inauguration of President George W. Bush and covering the impeachment of President Bill Clinton.

== 2008 presidential race interviews ==
On October 23, 2008, West interviewed Democratic vice-presidential candidate Joe Biden with questions she personally wrote. West asked Biden if he was "embarrassed about Barack Obama's affiliation with ACORN" given allegations of voter registration fraud by ACORN in elections past, likened Obama's response to a question from Ohio voter "Joe the Plumber" to a quote from Karl Marx, asked how Obama is not being a Marxist given his views on "spreading the wealth", and questioned if Obama might lead the U.S. "into a socialist country much like Sweden." At one point, Biden asked West if she was joking, and later suggested she was offering "talking points" against Obama.

The Obama campaign responded saying "This station's interview with Joe Biden wasn't tough — it was just absurd." The Obama campaign cancelled a subsequent interview with the candidate's wife, Jill Biden. Obama's Florida spokeswoman called West "both combative and woefully uninformed about simple facts." WFTV's news director defended her, saying she had not been inappropriately tough: "I'd rather be known as aggressive than pulling punches. We ask questions on behalf of viewers."

While praised by "birther conspirators", reactions from mainstream commentators were negative. Her performance was criticized as a "desperate audition for a primetime job at Fox News", considered a partisan stunt after she gave a soft interview to Republican candidate John McCain and West was characterized as exhibiting conservative bias. Others said that these characterizations were unfair and that Biden had overreacted. A few noted her husband's connections with the Republican Party, questioning if that was an influencing factor. West attempted and failed to deflect criticisms by promoting her husband's relationships with the Clinton Administration State Department and the Department of Justice Office of Civil Rights Enforcement.

Awards and achievements
Preceded by Elizabeth Sackler	Miss Vermont; 1969	Succeeded by Pati Papineau
