= Miss Vermont =

Beauty pageant competition

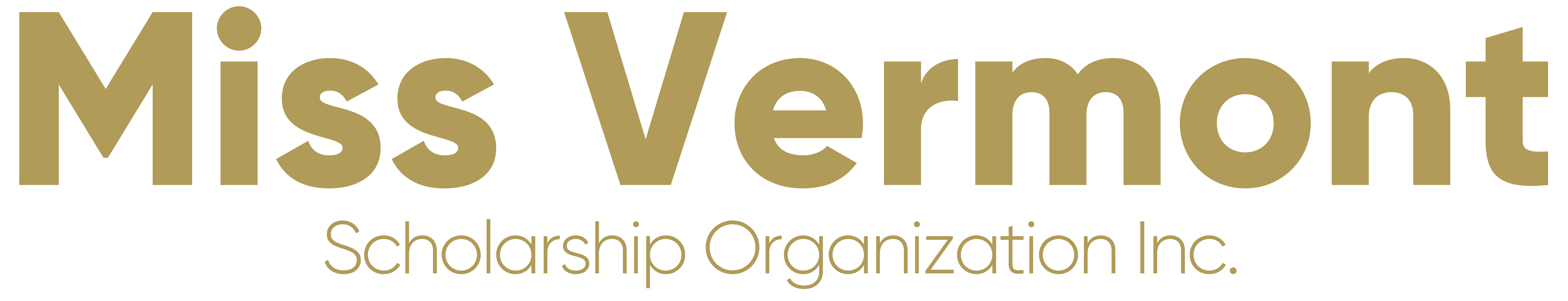
- Formation: 1945
- Type: Beauty pageant
- Headquarters: Stowe
- Location: Vermont
- Members: Miss America
- Official language: English
- Key people: Darcie Fisher
- Website: Official website

The Miss Vermont competition is the pageant that selects the representative for the state of Vermont in the Miss America pageant. While Vermont is the only state to have never had a contestant advance to the semi-finals of the Miss America pageant, their representatives have won numerous non-finalist awards.

Hannah Roque of Middlebury was crowned Miss Vermont on April 26, 2026, at the Spruce Peak Performing Arts Center in Stowe, Vermont. She will compete for the title of Miss America 2027 in September 2026.

== Results summary ==
The following is a visual summary of the past results of Miss Vermont titleholders at the national Miss America pageants/competitions. The year in parentheses indicates the year of the national competition during which a placement and/or award was garnered, not the year attached to the contestant's state title.

=== Placements ===
- Miss Americas: N/A
- 1st runners-up: N/A
- 2nd runners-up: N/A
- 3rd runners-up: N/A
- 4th runners-up: N/A
- Semi-finalists: N/A

=== Awards ===
==== Preliminary awards ====
- Preliminary Lifestyle and Fitness: N/A
- Preliminary Talent: Ashley Wheeler (2009) for her a capella vocal performance of "God Bless America." This marked the first time a representative of the state of Vermont won a preliminary award at the Miss America Pageant.

==== Non-finalist awards ====
- Non-finalist Interview: Drell Latasha Hunter (2004)
- Non-finalist Talent: Joan Hewitt (1958), Brenda Naatz (1960), Melissa Hetzel (1964), Elizabeth Sackler (1969), Sue Glover (1972), Joylynn McCraw (1974), Carole Spolar (1981), Erica Van Der Linde (1986), Michelle Dawson (1987), Jacqueline Quirk (1994), Sarah Watson (2007), Ashley Wheeler (2009), Alayna Westcom (2016)

==== Other awards ====
- Miss Congeniality: Sandra Simpson (1957), Julia Crane (2019)
- Rembrandt Award for Mentorship: Vanessa Branch (1995)
- STEM Scholarship Award Winners: Lucy Edwards (2015), Alayna Westcom (2016)
- STEM Scholarship Award Finalists: Julia Crane (2019), Danielle Morse (2022)
- Women Who Brand Finalists: Alexina Federhen (2023)

== Winners ==
Year	Name	Hometown	Age	Local Title	Miss America Talent	Placement at Miss America	Special scholarships at Miss America	Notes
2026	Hannah Roque	Middlebury	26	Miss Western Vermont	Vocal			Daughter of Miss Vermont 1996, Nicole Juvan, Contestant at National Sweetheart Pageant 2019
2025	Sophia Parker	Addison	26	Miss Addison County	HERStory			Previously Miss Vermont's Outstanding Teen 2015
2024	Meara Seery	Brattleboro	24	Miss Southern Vermont	Vocal, "Seven Nation Army"			Contestant at National Sweetheart 2021 Pageant, Vermont Cherry Blossom Princess at National Cherry Blossom Festival.
2023	Yamuna Turco	Colchester	20	Miss Green Mountains	Vocal, "Listen" from Dreamgirls			
2022	Alexina Federhen	Bennington	24	Miss Southern Vermont	Vocal		Women Who Brand Finalist	Previously Miss Vermont's Outstanding Teen 2014
2021	Danielle Morse	New Haven	22	Miss Addison County	Speed Painting, Johnny Cash portrait		STEM Scholarship Finalist	First firefighter to compete for Miss America
2019–20	Jillian Fisher	Burlington	20	-	Vocal, "Bennie and The Jets" by Elton John			Older sister of Miss Massachusetts' Outstanding Teen 2017, Carly Fisher
2018	Julia Crane	Colchester	22		Tap Dance, "Hey Momma/Hit the Road Jack" by Pentatonix		Miss Congeniality STEM Scholarship Award Finalist	Contestant at National Sweetheart 2016 pageant
2017	Erin Connor	Bridport	22		American Sign Language – Song Interpretation, "The Greatest Love of All"			Previously Miss Vermont's Outstanding Teen 2010 Obtained pilot's license at age 16 and piloted plane to Atlantic City for Miss America 2018 pageant
2016	Rylee Field	Montpelier	24		Spoken Word Poetry, Mockingbird by Rives			
2015	Alayna Westcom	Bakersfield	23		Scientific Experiment		Non-finalist Talent Award STEM Scholarship Award	Contestant at National Sweetheart 2014 pageant
2014	Lucy Edwards	Burlington	19		Vocal, "You'll Never Walk Alone"		STEM Scholarship Award	
2013	Jeanelle Achee	Rochester	22		Vocal, "Running"			
2012	Chelsea Ingram	Lyndonville	23		Operatic Vocal, "Habanera"			Former Meteorologist for WBAL-TV
2011	Katie Levasseur	Burlington	20		Scottish Highland Dance, "Toss the Feathers"			
2010	Caroline Bright	St. Albans	20		Vocal, "Let Yourself Go"			Previously Miss Vermont's Outstanding Teen 2007
2009	Laura Hall	South Burlington	21		Jazz Dance, "I Want To Go To Hollywood" from Grand Hotel			
2008	Ashley Wheeler	Lyndonville	21		A Cappella Vocal, "God Bless America"		Non-finalist Talent Award Preliminary Talent Award	Born in St. Johnsbury, Vermont, to Michael & Donna Ellsworth Wheeler; platform was Political Awareness Among Young Voters; wore an eco-friendly gown that she had crafted by local Vermont designer Tara Lynn; Vermont Secretary of State Deb Markowitz presented Wheeler with one of seven Enduring Democracy Awards for her commitment to advancing the democratic process in the state.
2007	Rachel Ann Cole	Middlebury	22		Monologue, "Queen Hermione" from A Winter's Tale			As of 2020, a senior producer for The Try Guys and their company, 2nd Try LLC.
2006	Sarah Watson	Enosburg Falls	21		Classical Piano, "Doctor Gradus ad Parnassum"		Non-finalist Talent Award	
2005	Megan Plebani	Weybridge	24		Gymnastics Jazz Dance, Music from Pirates of the Caribbean			
2004	Megan Yardley	Burlington	24		Vocal, "Who Can I Turn To?"			
2003	Drell Latasha Hunter	Sharon	24		Lyrical Dance		Non-finalist Interview Award	
2002	Sarah Jo Willey	Bakersfield	24		Vocal, "You Do Something to Me"			Contestant at National Sweetheart 2001 pageant
2001	Amy Marie Johnson	Essex Junction	22		Classical Piano, "Impromptu"			
2000	Hannah Jane Nelson	Ryegate Corner	24		Vocal, "I Will Survive"			Contestant at National Sweetheart 1999 pageant
1999	Katy Johnson	Burlington	21		Vocal, "Two Little Words" from Steel Pier			Later Miss Vermont USA 2001
1998	Aimee Rzewuski	Lyndonville	21		Tap Dance, "Greased Lightnin'" from Grease			
1997	Jill Renee Cummings	Montgomery Center	20		Vocal, "Someone to Watch Over Me"			
1996	Nicole Juvan	Essex Junction	22		Vocal, "Some Day My Prince Will Come"			Mother of Hannah Roque, Miss Vermont 2026
1995	Jennifer Faucette	Burlington	24		Piano & Violin, "Hungarian Dance No. 5"			
1994	Vanessa Branch	London, England	21		Dramatic Monologue		Rembrandt Award for Mentorship	Eligible as a student at Middlebury CollegeDual citizenship in the United Kingdom and United States
1993	Jacqueline Quirk	Burlington	24		Classical Vocal, "Chi Il Bel Sogno Di Doretta" from La rondine		Non-finalist Talent Award	
1992	Nicole Gentry	Middlebury	23	Miss University of Vermont	Jazz Vocal, "Hit Me With a Hot Note And Watch Me Bounce" from Sophisticated Ladies			
1991	Tina Ostrowski	Bellows Falls	21	Miss Bellows Falls	Vocal, "I've Got a Crush on You"			
1990	Debra Lewin	South Burlington	24	Miss Burlington	Dance			
1989	Catherine Stillinger	Burlington	24	Miss Greater Burlington	Vocal Medley			
1988	Julie Tidd	Barre	25		Jazz Dance			
1987	Susan Bora	Colchester	26		Percussion, "Opus D Opus – The Tonight Show Theme"			
1986	Michelle Dawson	Charlotte	18		Vocal, "I Could Have Danced All Night" from My Fair Lady		Non-finalist Talent Award	
1985	Erica Van Der Linde	Old Bennington	21	Miss Southern Vermont	Classical Piano, "Waldesrauschen"		Non-finalist Talent Award	
1984	Lorrie Glosick	Winooski	21	Miss Middlebury	Vocal, "The Trolley Song"			
1983	Juliet Lambert	Middlebury	19	Miss Middlebury	Vocal, "Don't Rain on My Parade"			
1982	Jill Wyckoff	South Burlington	20	Miss Middlebury	Gymnastics Dance, Theme from CHiPs			
1981	Kimberly Nestle	Shelburne	19	Miss Burlington	Acrobatic Jazz Dance, "I Hope I Get It" from A Chorus Line			
1980	Carole Spolar	St. Albans	24		Dramatic Monologue from The Miracle Worker		Non-finalist Talent Award	
1979	Shari Bach	Middlebury	22	Miss Central Vermont	Classical Piano, Holberg Suite			
1978	Lisa Volkert	Middlebury	20	Miss Middlebury	Comedy Monologue, "Collage of TV Commercials: My TV Nightmare"			
1977	Andrea Petty	Poultney	18	Miss Green Mountain College	Classical Vocal, "Glitter And Be Gay" from Candide			
1976	Suzanne Wind	Saxtons River	18	Miss Brattleboro Winter Carnival	Acrobatic Jazz Dance, "Wisdom"			
1975	Katherine Rechsteiner	Warren	23	Miss Warren	Electric Organ, "Galloping Comedian"			Later Miss Vermont USA 1979
1974	Donna Shea	Windsor	21	Miss Windsor	Oratory, "Eulogy of John F. Kennedy"			
1973	Joylynn McCraw	Barre	22	Miss University of Vermont	Popular Vocal & Sign Language, "I Am Woman"		Non-finalist Talent Award	
1972	Kathy Hebert	Burlington	21	Miss Burlington	Vocal & Guitar with Display of Fashion Design, "I Don't Know How to Love Him"			
1971	Sue Glover	Brattleboro	18	Miss Brattleboro Winter Carnival	Gymnastics Routine on the Uneven Parallel Bars		Non-finalist Talent Award	
1970	Pati Papineau	Rutland	19	Miss Green Mountain College	Classical Ballet, "The Stars and Stripes Forever"			
1969	Barbara Schmitt	South Hero	21	Miss University of Vermont	Comedic Reading, "Archy and Mehitabel"			
1968	Elizabeth Sackler	Putney	20	Miss Brattleboro Winter Carnival	Modern Dance Interpretation to Self-Recorded Reading of "The Last Flower"		Non-finalist Talent Award	
1967	Kathleen Rowley	Williston	19		Vocal Presentation of an Original Song, "The Bigness of Being Small"			
1966	Karen Tuttle	Brattleboro	18	Miss Brattleboro Winter Carnival	Popular Vocal & Jazz Dance			
1965	Lois Dodge	Grand Isle	20		Vocal, "Climb Ev'ry Mountain"			
1964	Jean Conner	Rutland	21		Popular Vocal			
1963	Melissa Hetzel	Burlington			Popular Vocal, "Fly Me to the Moon"		Non-finalist Talent Award	
1962	Elaine Wright	Burlington	22		Display of Fashion Designs			
1961	Janice Cole	Binghamton, NY	18		Dramatic Reading from Romeo and Juliet			Eligible as a student at University of Vermont
1960	Anne Masino	Randolph	18		Accordion, "China Boy"			
1959	Brenda Johnston Naatz	St. Johnsbury	19		Piano & Impersonation of Victor Borge		Non-finalist Talent Award	
1958	Sandra Sinclair	South Burlington			Vocal & Dance, "Getting to Know You"			
1957	Joan Hewitt	Brattleboro			Art Presentation & Original Skit with Original Music		Non-finalist Talent Award	
1956	Sandra Simpson	Barre			Dress Design		Miss Congeniality	
1955	Phyllis Reich	Bennington			Vocal & Dance			
1954	Annabelle Katherine "Pinky" Pinkham	Jericho Center	22		Drama			
1953	Carlene King Johnson	Rutland			Dance			Later Miss Vermont USA 1955; Crowned Miss USA 1955; Semi-finalist at Miss Universe 1955 pageant
1952	Barbara Jane Moore	St. Johnsbury	19		Baton Twirling / Dance			
1951	Peggy Gilbert	Rutland			Dance			
1950	Eleanor Jean Kangas	Springfield	21					
1949	Annalou Johnston	Enosburg Falls						
1948	Jean Margaret Peatman	Montpelier	18					Jean M. Peatman Constantine Theobald, 94, died at home in Orange, Vermont on March 19, 2024.
1947	Barbara Campbell	Montpelier			Vocal, "Blue Skies"			
1946	Lola Sundberg	Burlington						
1945	Mary Staikos	Burlington						
1935–1944	No Vermont representative at Miss America pageant							
1934	No national pageant was held							
1933	No Vermont representative at Miss America pageant Actually Nettina Anne Rich of Norton, MA was Miss Vermont in the Miss America 1933 Pageant Nettina Anne Rich died at age 90 on June 15, 2005, in Middleborough, Massachusetts.							
1932	No national pageants were held							
1931	No national pageants were held							
1930	No national pageants were held							
1929	No national pageants were held							
1928	No national pageants were held							
1924–1927	No Vermont representative at Miss America pageant							
1923	Hazel Gove	Burlington		Miss Burlington	N/A			Competed under local title at national pageant
1922	No Vermont representative at Miss America pageant							
1921	No Vermont representative at Miss America pageant							
