= Amara Asavananda =

Thai actress (born 1937)

- อมรา อัศวนนท์
- Born: Amara Asavananda; 6 May 1936 (age 90); Bangkok, Siam
- Spouse: Ankoon Purananda (m. 1966)
- Children: 2
- Beauty pageant titleholder
- Title: 2nd Runner-up Miss Thailand 1953
- Hair color: Black
- Eye color: Black
- Major competitions: Miss Thailand 1953 (2nd Runner-up); Miss Universe 1954 (Delegates)

Amara Asavananda (Thai: อมรา อัศวนนท์; RTGS: Amara Atsawanon, born 6 May 1936) is a Thai actress and beauty pageant titleholder who placed second runner-up of Miss Thailand 1953. She is the first daughter of Luang Prachoet-aksoralak (Sombhoj Asavananda) and Madam Georgette Asavananda. Her father was Thai and her mother was French. She was the 2nd Runner-up Miss Thailand 1953 and she competed in the Miss Universe 1954 pageant competition held in the United States.

== Filmography ==
=== Films ===
Year	Title	Role	Notes
1955	Pritsana	Pritsana	Main role
1957	Rak Rissaya	Pattama	Main role
1957	Prattana Haeng Hua Jai	Montaka	Main role
1958	Waew Mayura	Waew Mayura	Main role
1959	Honorable Prisoner	Mom Rajawongse Alisa Santatiwong	Main role
1959	Pol Nikorn Kimnguan Talui Harem	Nuanlaor Thaithae	Main role
1962	Sa Kao Duen		Support role
1963	Kom Payabaht	"Yen"/Nueayen	Support role
1963	Jamloei Rak	Sansanee	Support role
1967	Aya Ruk	Son	Main role
1968	Sap Sawat		Support role
1974	Nam Pueng Kom	Rose	Support role
1976	Sawan Yangmi	Mother	Support role
1983	O' Money	Wimonwan	Support role
1985	Kul Pung Ha		Support role
1987	The Red Roof	Dao Dara	Support role
1990	Bank Robbers	Somjeen	Support role
1990	Nang-Eye	Sister St. Pauli	Support role
2004	Pisaj	Aunt Bua	Support role
2009	Sassy Player		Support role
2014	The Last Executioner		Support role

=== TV Dramas ===
She is an actress in Thai film and television drama as Prisana (1955), Leb-krut (1957), Rak Rissaya (1958), In-sree Dang (1958), Hao Dong (1958), Toong Ruang Rong (1959), See Kings (1959), Chaleoy Suk (1959,) Sud Pradthana (1961) etc.

In 1966, she married police lieutenant general Ankoon Purananda, and they have two daughters, Apichaya and Anoma.
