= Miss Vermont Teen USA =

Beauty pageant competition

- Formation: 1983
- Type: Beauty pageant
- Headquarters: Burlington
- Location: Vermont
- Members: Miss Teen USA
- Official language: English
- Website: Official website

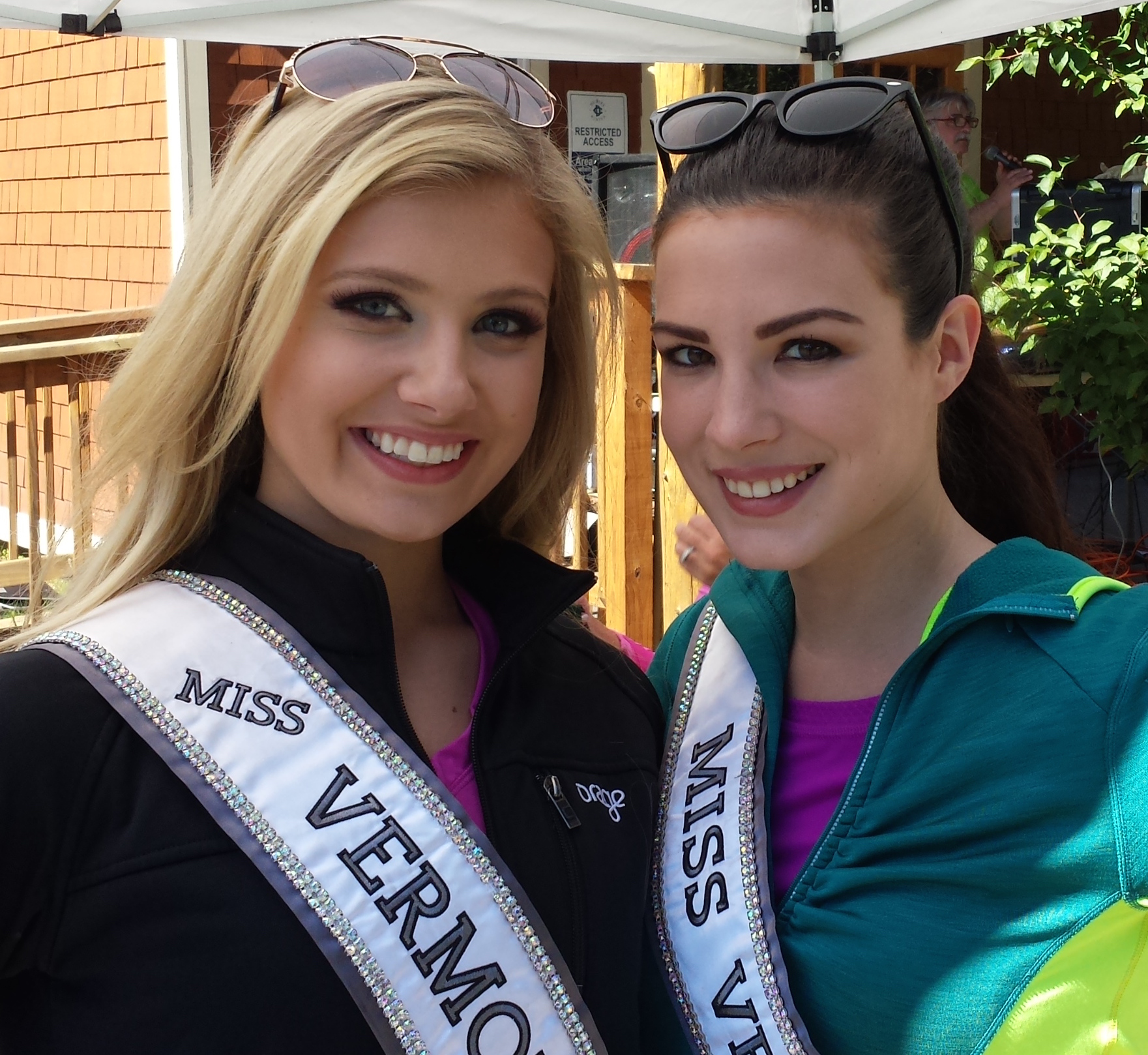
Miss Vermont Teen USA 2015, Alexandra Marek, and Miss Vermont USA 2015, Jackie Croft.

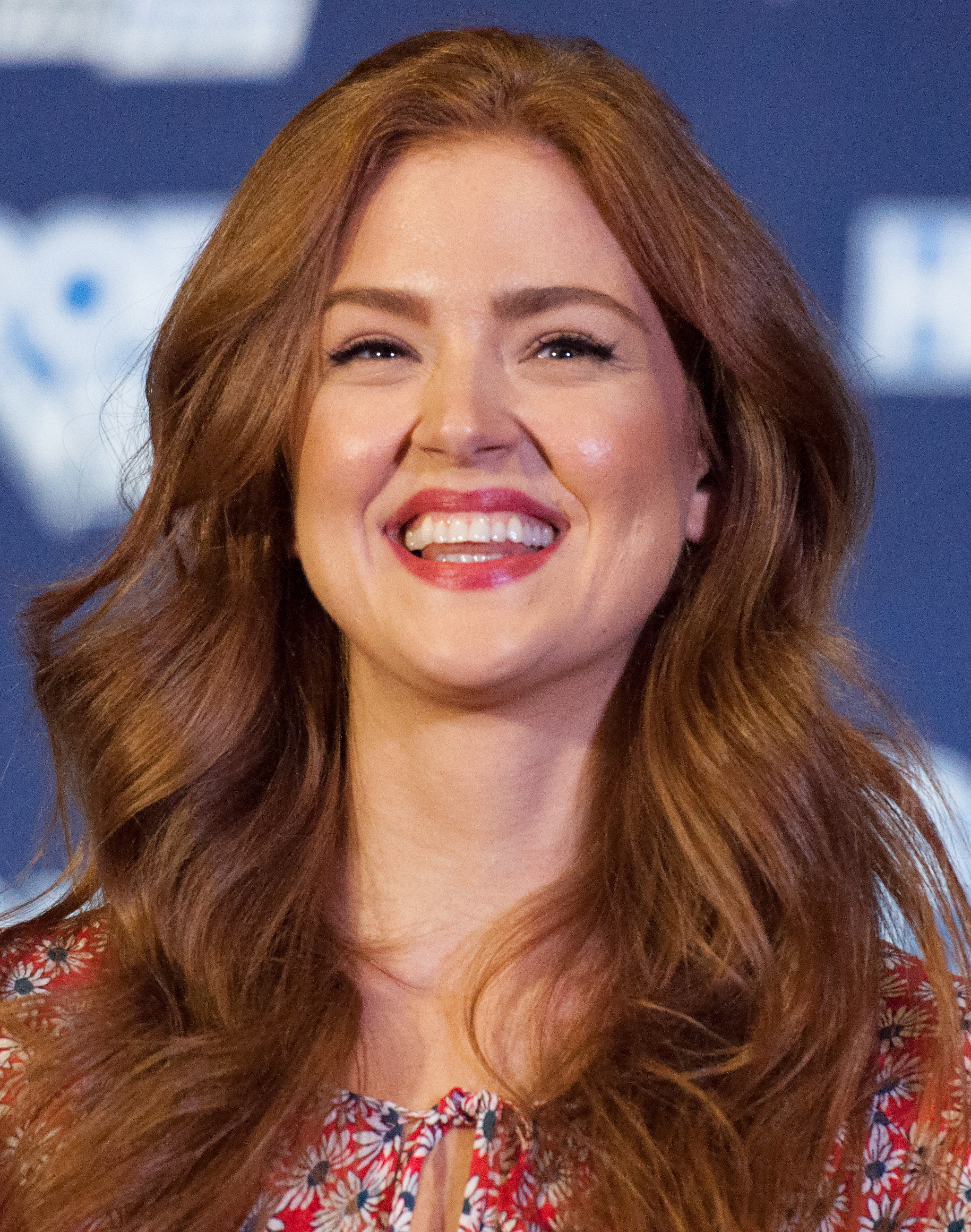
Miss Vermont Teen USA 2004 Maggie Geha

The Miss Vermont Teen USA competition is the pageant that selects the representative for the state of Vermont in the Miss Teen USA pageant. It is formerly directed by Sanders & Associates, Inc., dba- Pageant Associates based in Buckhannon, West Virginia from 2004 to 2017 before GDB Theatre and Pageant Productions becoming the new directors of the stage pageant since 2018.

Charlotte Lopez, Miss Vermont Teen USA 1993, was the first Vermont Teen to win the Miss Teen USA crown and the 10th state that won the title for the first time. Five Miss Vermont Teen USA titleholders have won the Miss Vermont USA title and competed at Miss USA.

Prior to 2022, no sisters had been held the Miss and Teen titles in a single state. Vermont became the first state to have biological sisters holding the statewide Miss USA and Miss Teen USA titles simultaneously, when Kenzie Golonka crowned Teen and her sister (and former Teen titleholder) Kelsey crowned Miss.

Payton Givens of Houston, TX was appointed Miss Vermont Teen USA on June 30th, 2026 after the open casting call from Thomas Brodeur, the new owner of the national pageant. She will represent Vermont at Miss Teen USA 2026.

== Results summary ==
=== Placements ===
- Miss Teen USA: Charlotte Lopez (1993)
- 2nd runners-up: Kara Quinn (1989)
- Top 15: Alexandra Marek (2015), Tammy Vujanovic (2016), Kelsey Golonka (2017)

Vermont holds a record of 5 placements at Miss Teen USA.

=== Awards ===
- Miss Congeniality: Lavinia Magruder (1996), Karsen Woods (2012)

== Winners ==
- Declared as Winner
- Ended as runner-up
- Ended as one of the finalists or semifinalists

Year	Name	Hometown	Age^{1}	Local title	Placement at Miss Teen USA	Special awards at Miss Teen USA	Notes
2026	Payton Givens	Houston, TX	17	Miss Harris County Teen			
2025	Alaina Barlock	Pittsburgh, PA	19	Miss Mt. Lebanon Teen			
2024	Josslyn McKenna	Colchester	15	Miss Chittenden County Teen			Later 2rd runner-up to Miss Vermont’s Teen 2026
2023	Nadja Dacres	Colchester	16	Miss Colchester Teen			
2022	Kenzie Golonka	Montpelier	16	Miss Capitol City Teen			Sister of Kelsey Golonka, Miss Vermont Teen USA 2017 and Miss Vermont USA 2022
2021	Jamisyn Baker	Rutland	15				
2020	Kiera Pipeling	West Rutland	17				
2019	Jenna Howlett	Bridport	16				Later Miss Vermont USA 2023
2018	Alexandra Diehl	St. Albans	17				Previously Miss Vermont's Outstanding Teen 2016
2017	Kelsey Golonka	Montpelier	17		Top 15		Later Miss Vermont USA 2022; Top 12 at Miss USA 2022; sister of Kenzie Golonka, Miss Vermont Teen USA 2022
2016	Tammy Vujanovic	Burlington	16		Top 15		
2015	Alexandra Marek	Barre	16		Top 15		
2014	Madison Cota	Bellows Falls	17				Later Miss Vermont USA 2017; Semifinalist at Miss Massachusetts 2018
2013	Sophia Hadeka	Fair Haven	15				Previously Miss Vermont's Outstanding Teen 2011
2012	Karsen Woods	Westford	17			Miss Congeniality	
2011	Bridget Martin	Stowe	14				
2010	Shelby Gregoire	Barre	17				
2009	Brittany Kelemen	Jonesville	18				
2008	Sydney Perry	Middlesex	17				Later Miss North Carolina USA 2012
2007	Olivia Hubbard	Rutland	17				
2006	Katharine Williams	Richmond	17				
2005	Jessica Fillion	Williston	18				
2004	Maggie Geha	Brattleboro	16				
2003	Jenna Lajeunesse	Barre	17				
2002	Melinda Karr	Burlington	15				
2001	Heather Moylan	Derby	18				
2000	JoAnna Velucci	Burlington	17				
1999	Jennifer "Jen" Ripley	Barre	19				Later Miss Vermont USA 2003 and Mrs. Vermont America 2009 under her married name, Jennifer Bisson.
1998	Dawn Carrow	Vernon	18				
1997	Mariah Billado	Burlington	18				
1996	Lavinia Magruder	Burlington	17			Miss Congeniality	
1995	Melissa Perron	Barton	18				
1994	Christel Marquardt	Vergennes	17				
1993	Charlotte Anne Lopez	Dorset	16		Miss Teen USA 1993		
1992	Lisa Robie	Milton	18				
1991	Anne-Marie Geroe	Newport	17				
1990	Gessica Tortolano	Randolph	16				
1989	Kara Quinn	Rutland	15		2nd runner-up		
1988	Andrea Varney	South Hero	16				
1987	Christy Beltrami	Barre	18				Later Miss Vermont USA 1994
1986	Holly Matava	Brattleboro	17				
1985	Wanda Minard	South Burlington	17				
1984	Darcy Hedrick	Bennington	17				
1983	Cindy Gentile	Charlotte	16				

^{1} Age at the time of the Miss Teen USA pageant
