= Miriam Stevenson =

American actress and model

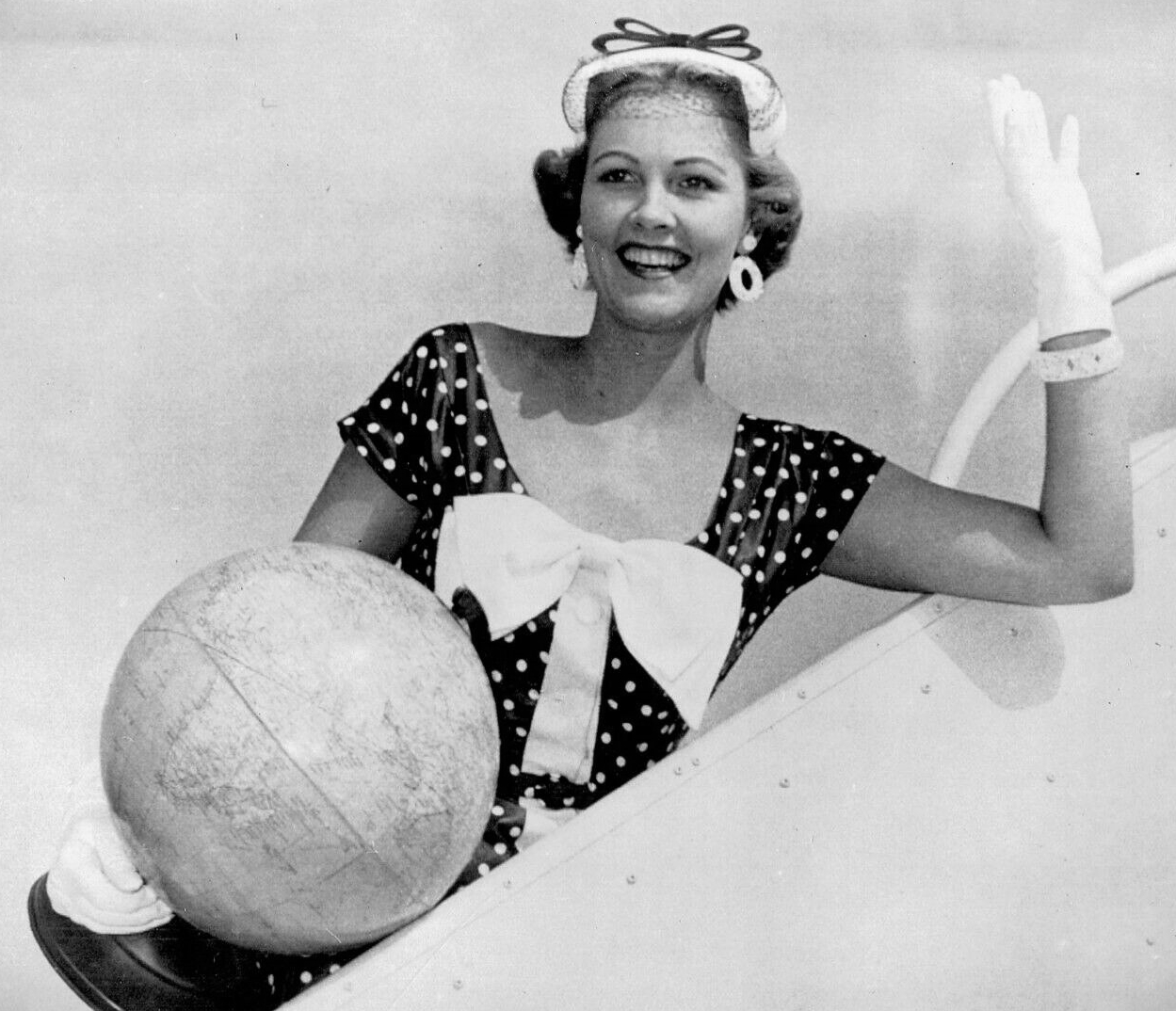
- Stevenson in 1954
- Born: Miriam Jacqueline Stevenson; January 4, 1933 (age 93); Winnsboro, South Carolina, U.S.
- Education: Lander University
- Height: 1.68 m (5 ft 6 in)
- Spouse: Donald Upton
- Children: 2
- Beauty pageant titleholder
- Title: Miss South Carolina 1953; Miss South Carolina USA 1954; Miss USA 1954; Miss Universe 1954
- Hair color: Brown
- Eye color: Blue
- Major competitions: Miss South Carolina 1953 (Winner); Miss America 1954 (Top 10); Miss South Carolina USA 1954 (Winner); Miss USA 1954 (Winner); Miss Universe 1954 (Winner)

Miriam Jacqueline Stevenson (born January 4, 1933) is an American former actress, television host, model and beauty queen who was crowned Miss Universe 1954. She was the first American to win the title and had previously been crowned Miss USA 1954. Prior to Miss USA, Stevenson was Miss South Carolina USA 1954. She also represented South Carolina in Miss America 1954 after winning Miss South Carolina 1953, where she placed in the top ten.

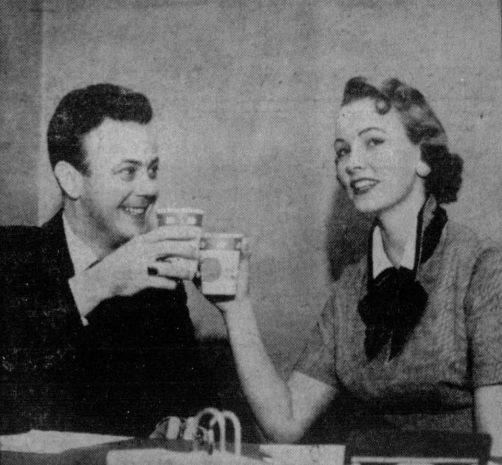
Stevenson (right) with husband Donald Upton in 1956

At Miss Universe, Stevenson received a tied final score with Martha Rocha of Brazil. In order to break the tie, the woman deemed to have the better physique was crowned the winner, due to a major sponsor of the pageant being Catalina Swimwear. This was determined to be Stevenson, due to having "fitter" hips than Rocha. She was crowned Miss Universe by outgoing titleholder Christiane Martel of France. At the end of her reign, she crowned Hillevi Rombin of Sweden as Miss Universe 1955.

Awards and achievements
| Preceded by (France) Christiane Martel | Miss Universe; 1954 | Succeeded by (Sweden) Hillevi Rombin |
| Preceded by Myrna Hansen | Miss USA; 1954 | Succeeded by Carlene King Johnson |
| Preceded by Susan Day | Miss South Carolina USA; 1954 | Succeeded by Sara Stone |
| Preceded by Mary Griffin | Miss South Carolina; 1953 | Succeeded by Polly Suber |
