= Martha Rocha =

Brazilian model (1932–2020)

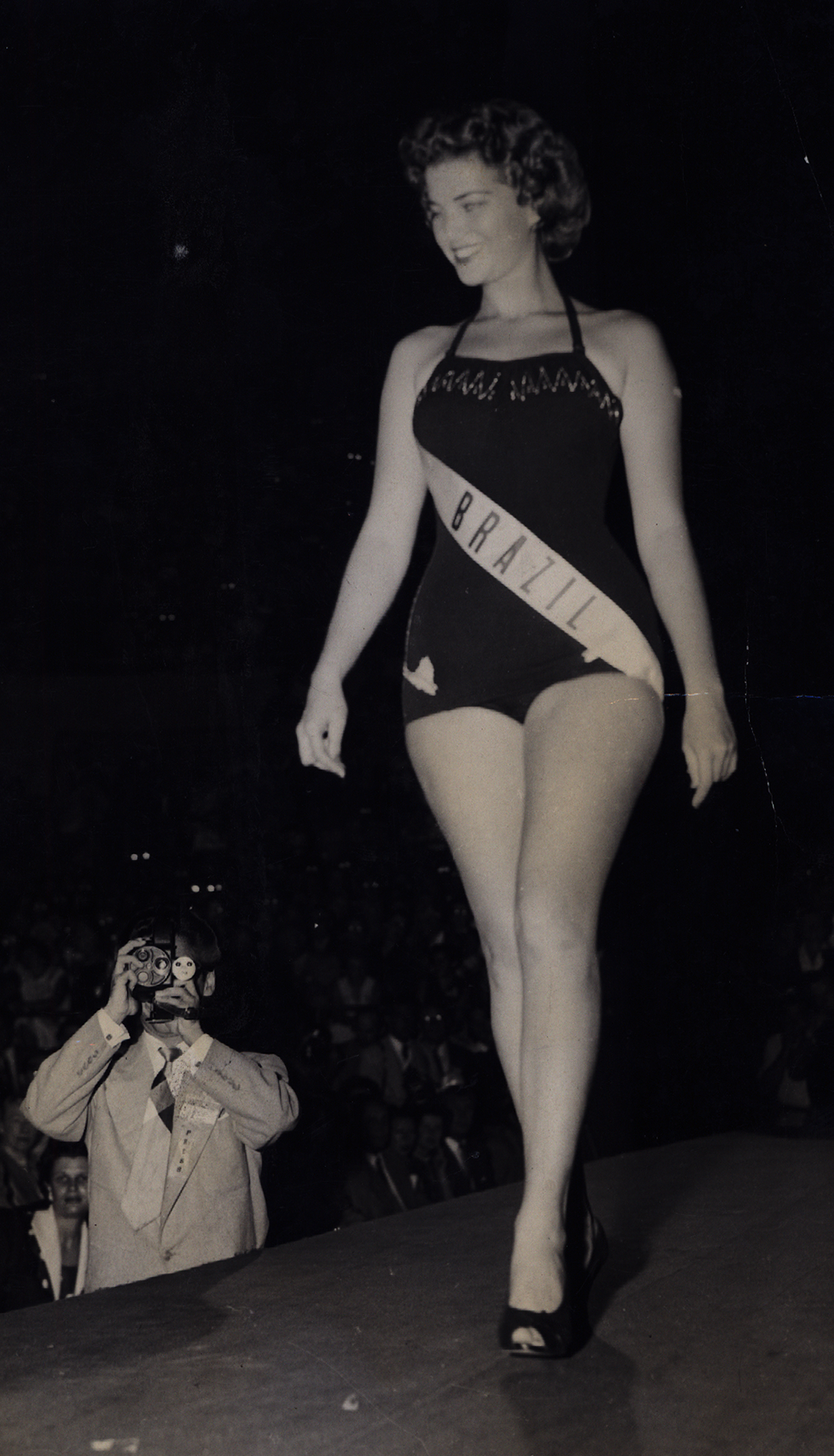
- On stage at Miss Universe 1954
- Born: Maria Martha Hacker Rocha; 19 September 1932; Salvador, Bahia, Brazil
- Died: 4 July 2020 (aged 87); Niterói, Rio de Janeiro, Brazil
- Beauty pageant titleholder
- Title: Miss Brasil 1954
- Hair color: Brown
- Eye color: Blue
- Major competitions: Miss Universe 1954; Runner-up

Maria Martha Hacker Rocha (Salvador, Bahia 19 September 1932 – Niterói, Rio de Janeiro, 4 July 2020) was a Brazilian model and beauty pageant titleholder who was the first winner of Miss Brasil 1954 and the 1st runner-up at Miss Universe 1954.

== Career ==
Rocha was born on 19 September 1932 in Salvador, Bahia. At the age of 18, in 1954, after winning the title of Miss Bahia in her home state, she became the first Miss Brazil to become a finalist of the Miss Universe pageant. However, despite wide acclamation, even in the US, for her to win the title of Miss Universe, it was Miss USA, Miriam Stevenson, who won the title. It is said that the final judgment came down to the fact that Miriam's hip measurement was 2 inches (51 mm) smaller than that of Martha. The narrower look was the "standard measure" at that time.

It is also said that after her victory, Miriam donated one of the two cars she had won (at Miss USA and Miss Universe pageants) to Martha, since she already had one even before taking part in beauty pageants. After Miss Universe, she worked as a model and advertising girl at Hollywood studios. For example, she earned US$30,000 to do a Gessy Lever advertisement.

Martha Rocha became a Brazilian reference of beauty and her name was used for a cake, a song, in poetry, and street names in the state of Bahia, Santa Catarina and São Paulo.

Martha participated in international horse championships alongside Queen Elizabeth II, and met Prince Charles, among other celebrities. She also imprinted her hands into the Ipanema Walk of Fame, in 2013.

Her name was given to the famous Martha Rocha aquamarine, found near Teófilo Otoni, Minas Gerais, Brazil. It weighed 134 pounds and yielded more than 300,000 carats of superb blue gems. It is said that the color was so intense and rich that it was likened to her eyes, and even today her name is a classification of tone and intensity when rating the finest-color aquamarines.

== Personal life and death ==
Martha was the seventh of eleven children of engineer Álvaro Rocha and his wife Hansa.

Martha married Portuguese-Argentinian banker Álvaro Piano and had two sons with him before his death in a plane crash when she was about 23 years old. She married for the second time Rio de Janeiro businessman Ronaldo Xavier de Lima, with whom she lived for 13 years and had a daughter, the artist Claudia Xavier de Lima.

In 2001, Rocha was diagnosed with breast cancer, but the disease was soon controlled.

In the last years of her life, she lived at a nursing home in Volta Redonda. She died in Niterói on 4 July 2020 after suffering respiratory failure which was followed by a heart attack. She was 87 years old. She was buried the next day at Santíssimo Sacramento cemetery in Niterói.

Awards and achievements
Preceded by New title	Miss Universo Brasil; 1954	Succeeded by (Ceará) pt:Emília Barreto
Preceded by New title	Miss Bahia; 1954	Succeeded by Maria Eunice Dias de Assis
