= Miss Vermont USA =

Beauty pageant competition

- Formation: 1952
- Type: Beauty pageant
- Headquarters: Buckhannon
- Location: West Virginia
- Members: Miss USA
- Official language: English
- Website: Official website

The Miss Vermont USA competition is the pageant that selects the representative for the state of Vermont in the Miss USA pageant. It is formerly directed by Sanders & Associates, Inc., dba- Pageant Associates based in Buckhannon, West Virginia from 2004 to 2017 before GDB Theatre and Pageant Productions becoming the new directors of the stage pageant since 2018.

Vermont produced a Miss USA, Carlene King Johnson in 1955. The most recent placement was by Kelsey Golonka in 2022 after 40 years, who reached the semifinals. Vermont holds the record for most Miss Congeniality awards, having earned a total of five.

Six Miss Vermont USAs have competed at Miss Teen USA, five as Miss Vermont Teen USA, and one as Miss New York Teen USA. Four have also competed at Miss America, including Miss USA 1955 Carlene King Johnson, the second out of six Miss USA winners who competed at both pageants.

Prior to 2022, no sisters had been held the Miss and Teen titles in a single state. Vermont became the first state to have biological sisters holding the statewide Miss USA and Miss Teen USA titles simultaneously, when Kelsey Golonka crowned Miss and her sister Kenzie crowned Teen.

Katherine McQuade of Whitestone, NY was appointed Miss Vermont USA on June 30th, 2026 after the open casting call from Thomas Brodeur, the new owner of the national pageant. She will represent Vermont at Miss USA 2026.

== Gallery of titleholders ==
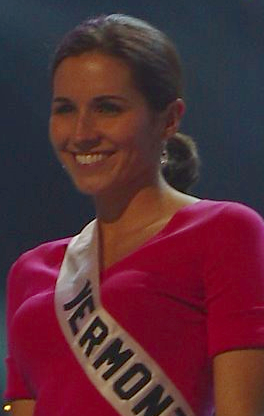
Michelle Fongemie, Miss Vermont USA 2004

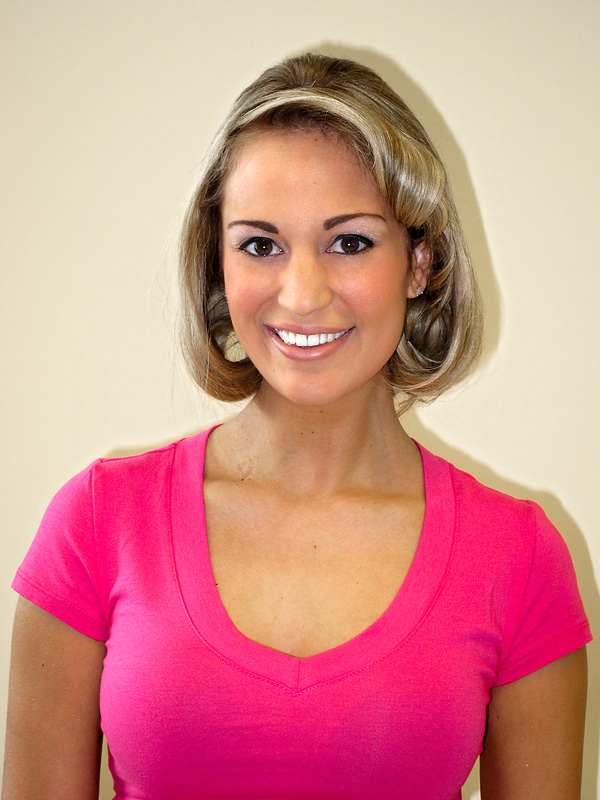
Sarah Westbrook, Miss Vermont USA 2013

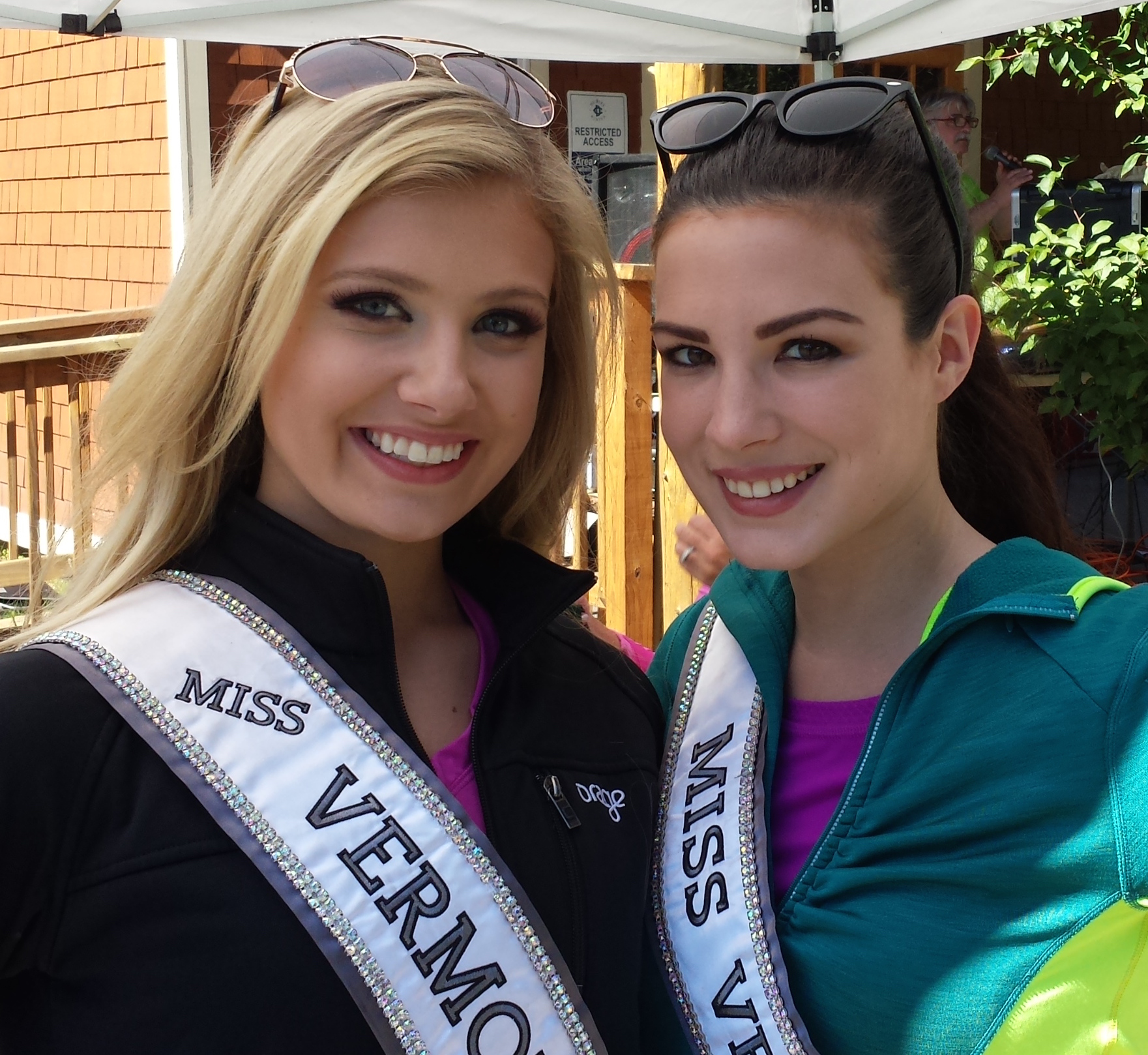
Miss Vermont Teen USA 2015, Alexandra Marek, and Miss Vermont USA 2015, Jackie Croft

== Results summary ==
- Miss USA: Carlene King Johnson (1955)
- 1st runners-up: Mary Verdiani (1969)
- Top 10/11/12/20: Sandra Bette Taft (1971), Georgia Davis (1982), Kelsey Golonka (2022), Victoria Chuah (2025)
- Vermont holds a record of 6 placements at Miss USA.

=== Awards ===
- Miss Congeniality: Mary Verdiani (1969), Donna Sue Thorton (1974), Constance Crabtree (1975), Nancy Jeanne Wierzbicki (1978), Michelle Fongemie (2004)

== Winners ==
Color key

- Declared as Winner
- Ended as runner-up
- Ended as one of the finalists or semifinalists

Year	Name	Hometown	Age (Note: Age at the time of crowning)	Local title	Placement at Miss USA	Special awards at Miss USA	Notes
2026	Katherine McQuade	Whitestone, NY	31				
2025	Victoria Chuah	Ashburn, VA	25		Top 10		Previously Miss Virginia 2022
2024	Samantha Vocatura	Stowe	27	Miss Stowe			Previously Miss World Vermont 2023
2023	Jenna Howlett	Bridport	21	Miss Addison County			Previously Miss Vermont Teen USA 2019
2022	Kelsey Golonka	Montpelier	22	Miss Montpelier	Top 12		Previously Miss Vermont Teen USA 2017; Top 15 at Miss Teen USA 2017; Sister of Kenzie Golonka, Miss Vermont Teen USA 2022
2021	Joanna Leigh Nagle	Colchester	27				Shortest reigning Miss Vermont USA at 9 months and 21 days
2020	Shannah Weller	Middlebury	23				Longest reigning Miss Vermont USA at 1 year, 6 months and 27 days
2019	Bethany Marie Garrow	Rutland	20				
2018	Maia-Jena Allo	Colchester	20				
2017	Madison Trimbey Cota	Bellows Falls	20				Previously Miss Vermont Teen USA 2014; Semifinalist at Miss Massachusetts 2018
2016	Neely Whitlock Fortune	Burlington	24				Cast member of Bravo program Camp Getaway
2015	Jacqueline "Jackie" Nicole Croft	Winooski	23				Contestant at National Sweetheart 2012
2014	Gina Bernasconi	Colchester	19				
2013	Sarah Landi Westbrook	Burlington	25				
2012	Jamie Lynn Dragon	Milton	25				
2011	Lauren Carter	Burlington	21				
2010	Nydelis Ortiz	Essex	20				
2009	Brooke Werner	Granville	22				
2008	Kim Tantlinger	Burlington	22				
2007	Jessica May Comolli	Montpelier	22				
2006	Amanda Gilman	Danville	20				
2005	Amanda Lee Mitteer	Brattleboro	26				
2004	Michelle Fongemie	Williston	26			Miss Congeniality	
2003	Jennifer Lee "Jen" Ripley	Barre					Previously Miss Vermont Teen USA 1999; Later Mrs. Vermont America 2009 under her married name, Jennifer Bisson.
2002	Brooke Elizabeth Angus	Essex					Miss World USA 2006
2001	Katy Johnson	Burlington					Previously Miss Vermont 1999; successfully sued Tucker Max in 2003 claiming he was using her name and photograph to promote himself
2000	Katie Bolton	Colchester					
1999	Nicole Lewis	Windsor					
1998	Catherine "Cathy" Bliss	Burlington					Previously Miss New York Teen USA 1990
1997	Lisa Jean Costantino	Burlington					
1996	Nancy Anne Roberts	Middlebury					
1995	Jennifer Cazeault	Winooski					
1994	Christy Ann Beltrami	Williston					Previously Miss Vermont Teen USA 1987
1993	Jodi Sicely	Burlington					
1992	Bonnie Kittredge	Burlington					
1991	Margaret Corey	Brattleboro					
1990	Stephanie Bessey	Chester					
1989	Stacey M. Palmer	Burlington					
1988	Stacy James Sisson	Rutland					
1987	Carole Woodworth	North Bennington					
1986	Tracey Danielle Morton	Rutland					
1985	Angie Cummingham	Rutland					
1984	Susan Elizabeth "Sue" O'Brien	Waterbury Center					
1983	Leslie Caroline Lucchina	Barre					
1982	Georgia Marie Davis	Bennington	22		Semi-finalist		
1981	Jeannette Wulff	Montpelier					
1980	Judi Mason	Randolph					
1979	Katherine "Kathi" Rechsteiner	Sugarbush Valley					Previously Miss Vermont 1975
1978	Nancy Jeanne Wierzbicki	Rutland				Miss Congeniality	
1977	Anne Kent	Castleton					
1976	Susan Parsons	Poultney					
1975	Constance Crabtree	Poultney				Miss Congeniality	
1974	Donna Sue Thorton	Poultney				Miss Congeniality	
1973	Bonnie Height	Poultney					
1972	Stacey Becker	Poultney					
1971	Sandra Bette Taft	West Dover	24		Semi-finalist		
1970	Cynthia "Cindy" Jurewicz	West Dover					
1969	Mary Verdiani	Montpelier	19		1st runner-up	Miss Congeniality	
1968	Susan "Sue" Glynn	Mt. Snow					
1967	Elaine Farrell	Burlington					
1966	Peggy Eckert	West Burke					
1965	Andrea Kenyon	North Bennington					
1964	Freda Elaine Betts	Bennington					
1963	Ellen "Bunny" Centerbar	North Bennington					
1962	Barbara "Bobby" Ann Kearney	Springfield					
1961	Susan Nielson	Poultney					
1960	Carole Mary Demas	Burlington					
1959	Sandra Jean Laquerre	Barre					
1958	Doreen Patricia McNamee	Brattleboro					
1957	Marjorie Link	East Harwick					
1956	Dolores Wettack	Westminster					
1955	Carlene King Johnson	Rutland	22		Miss USA 1955		Semifinalist at Miss Universe 1955; Previously Miss Vermont 1953
1954	Georgia Laurise	New Haven, CT	24				
1953	Kathleen Marie Eugenia Surrel	Brooklyn, NY	22				
1952	Elizabeth Whitcomb	Essex Junction					
