= Miss South Carolina USA =

Beauty pageant competition

- Formation: 1952
- Type: Beauty pageant
- Headquarters: Aiken
- Location: South Carolina
- Members: Miss USA
- Official language: English
- Key people: Ariana Blaize
- Website: Official website

The Miss South Carolina USA competition, previously known as Miss South Carolina Universe, is the pageant that selects the representative for the state South Carolina in the Miss USA pageant, and the name of the title held by that winner. The pageant is produced by Paula Miles, the sister of Miss South Carolina USA 1979, Janice McDonald, from 1980 until 2024 under directed by RPM Productions. In 2025 and onwards, the pageant is now produced and directed by Ariana Blaize, Miss Universe Guyana 2024, under A Blaize Productions alongside the rest of former RPM states.

Miriam Stevenson, South Carolina's first Miss USA and the United States' first Miss Universe, was also the first Miss USA winner to have competed at Miss America. She was the first woman to have competed at Miss America, Miss USA, and Miss Universe. South Carolina's second Miss USA was Shawn Weatherly, who also went on to win Miss Universe.

Nine Miss South Carolina USAs have also held the Miss South Carolina Teen USA title and competed at Miss Teen USA. Two have also competed at Miss America.

Miss South Carolina USA titleholders have also competed at two other major international pageants. Gina Tolleson, first runner-up at Miss USA 1990, went on to win the Miss World crown that year, and Miss South Carolina USA 2004, Amanda Pennekamp, has also competed at the Miss Earth 2006 pageant where she made the top 16.

Victoria Vesce of Charleston was crowned Miss South Carolina USA 2026 on June 28, 2026, at The Spartanburg Marriott Hotel in Spartanburg. She will represent South Carolina for the title of Miss USA 2026.

== Gallery of titleholders ==
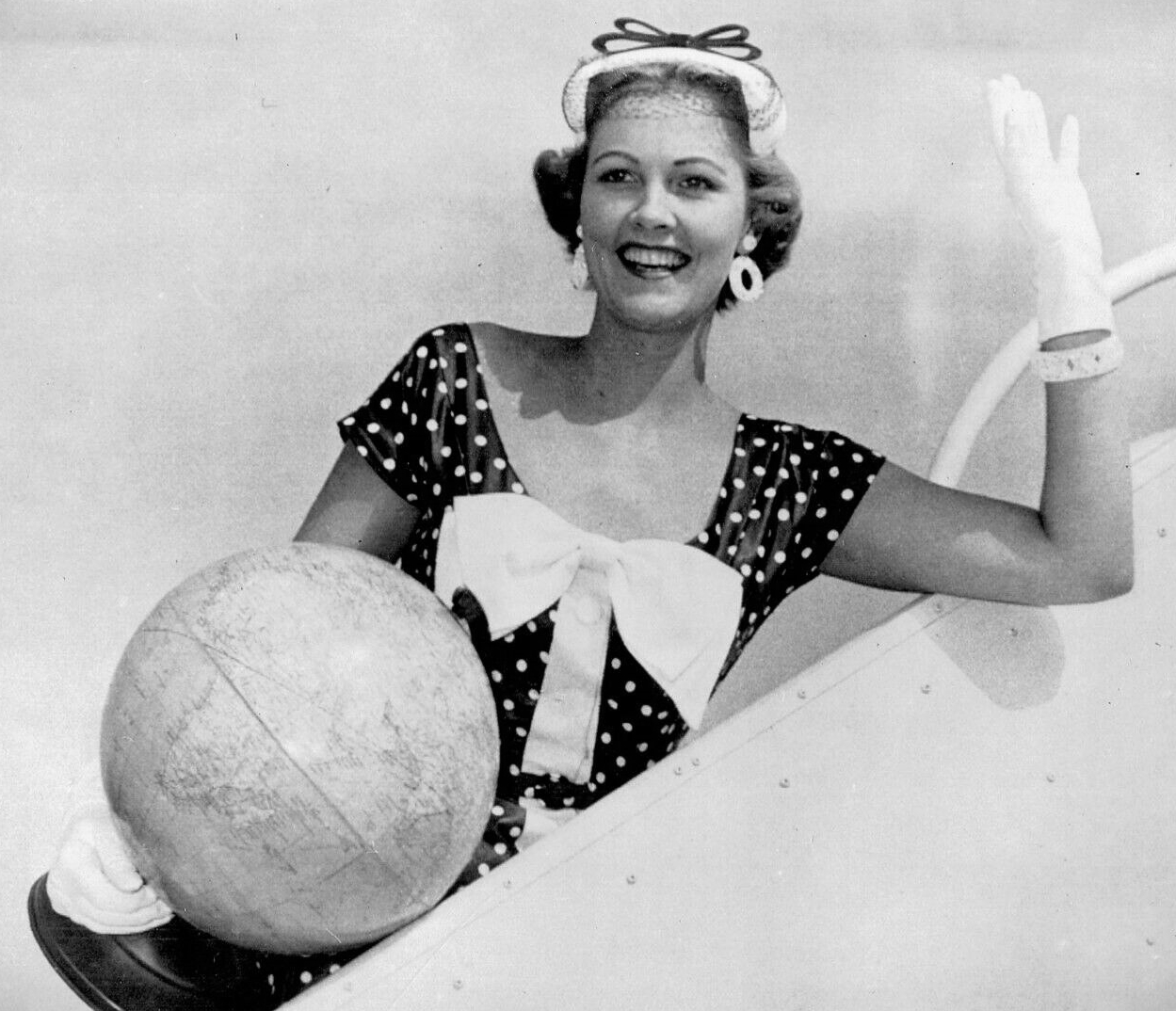
Miriam Stevenson, Miss South Carolina USA 1954, Miss USA 1954 & Miss Universe 1954

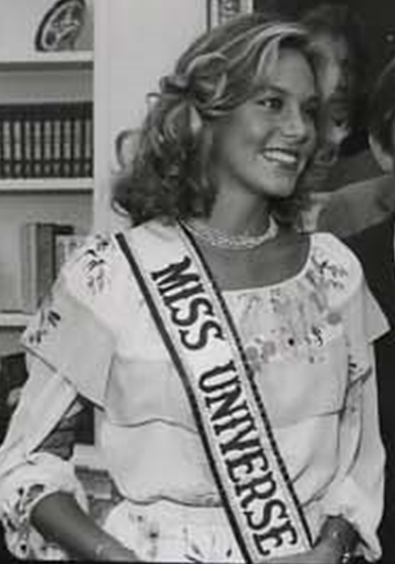
Shawn Weatherly, Miss South Carolina USA 1980, Miss USA 1980 & Miss Universe 1980

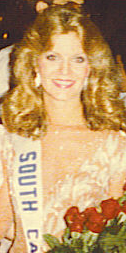
Allison Grisso, Miss South Carolina USA 1983

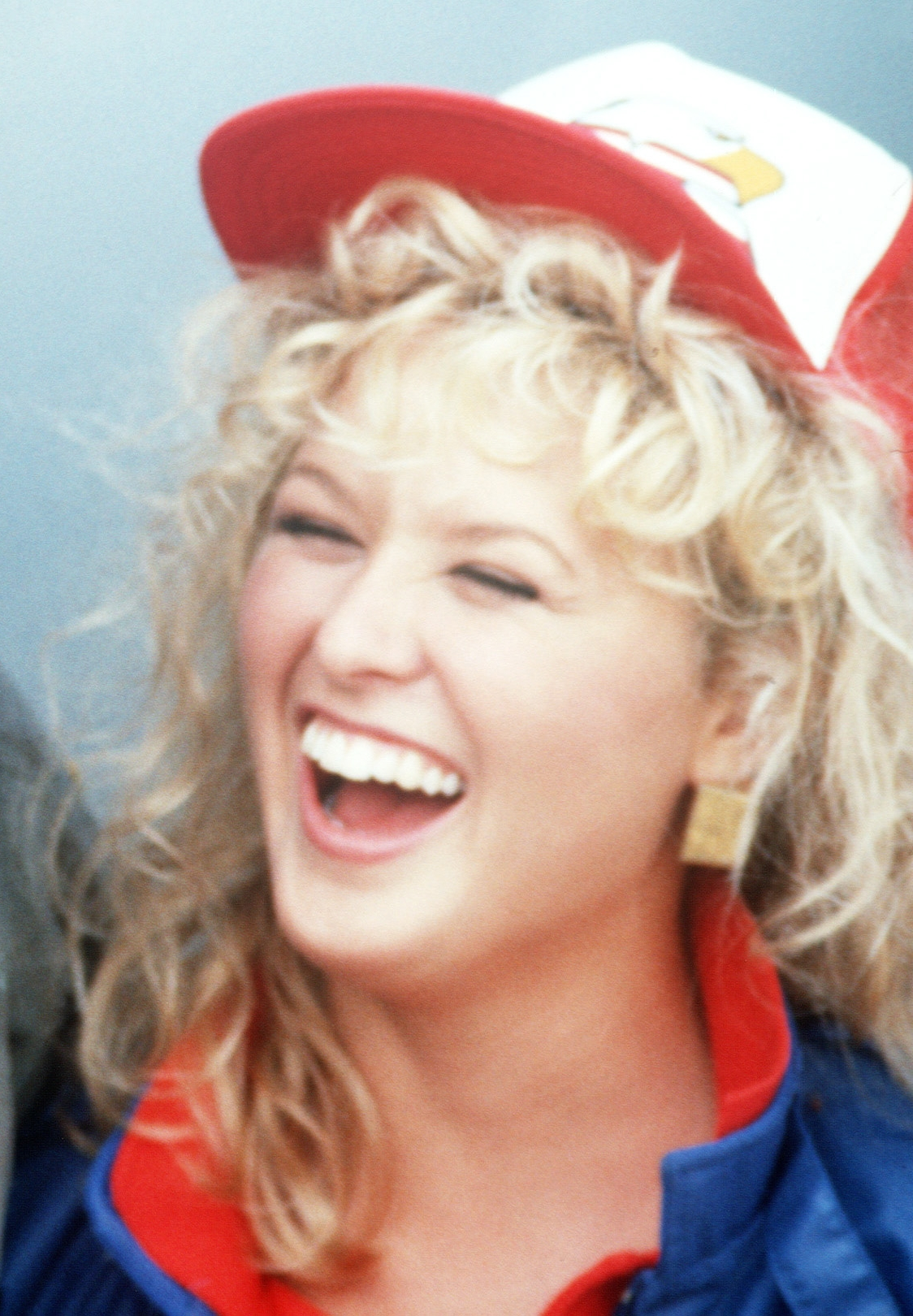
Maribeth Curry, Miss South Carolina USA 1986

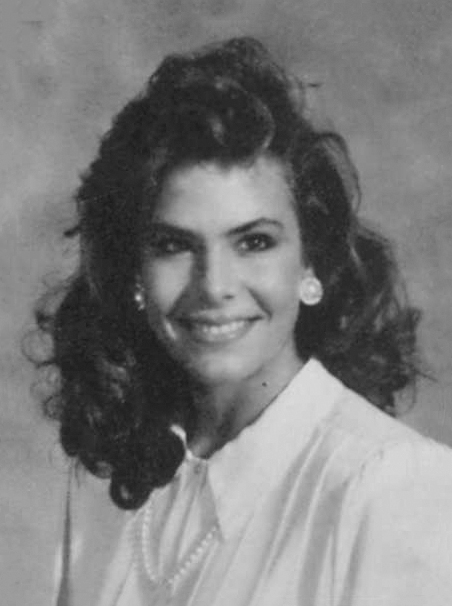
Gina Tolleson, Miss South Carolina USA 1990, Miss World USA 1990 & Miss World 1990

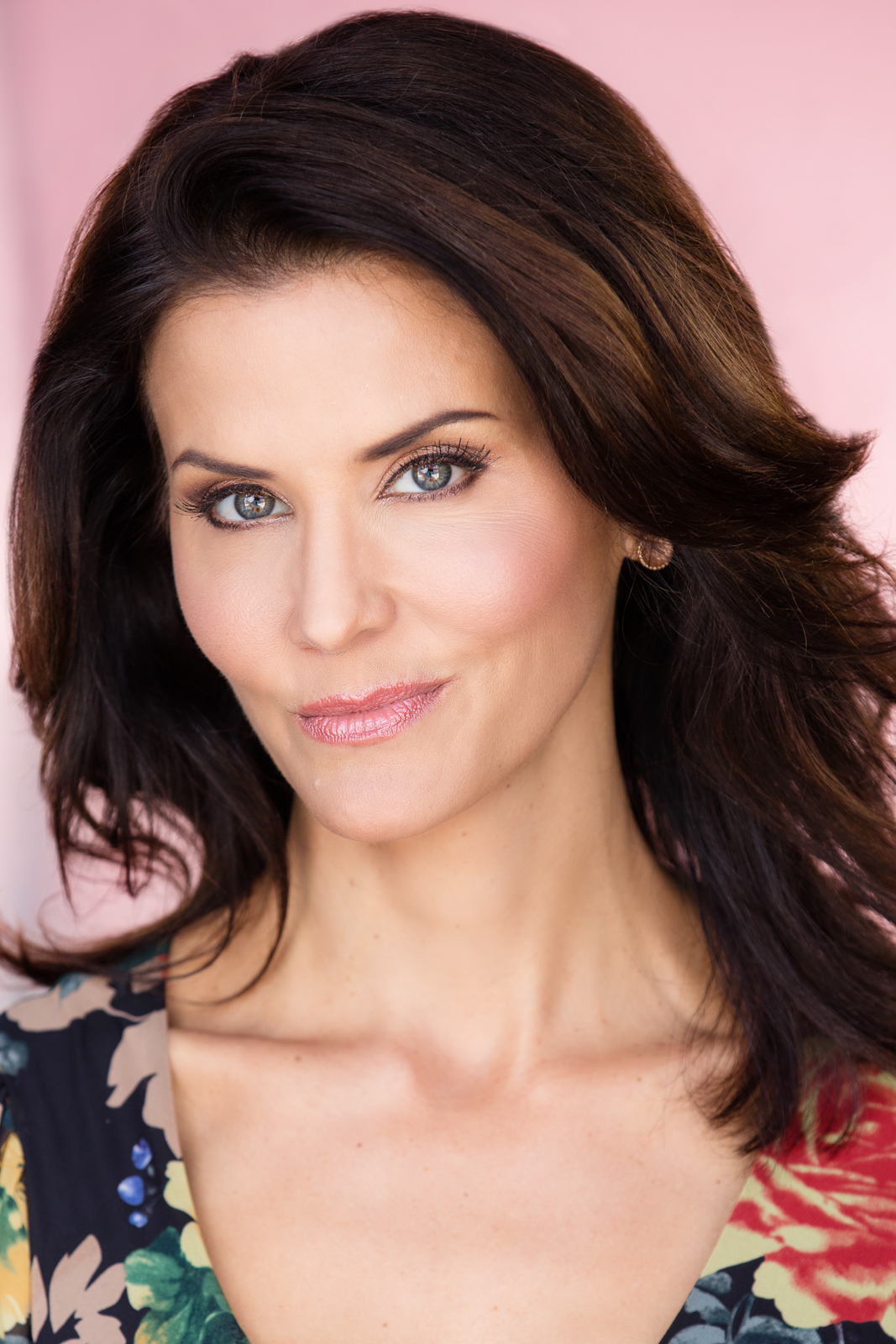
Lu Parker, Miss South Carolina USA 1994, Miss USA 1994

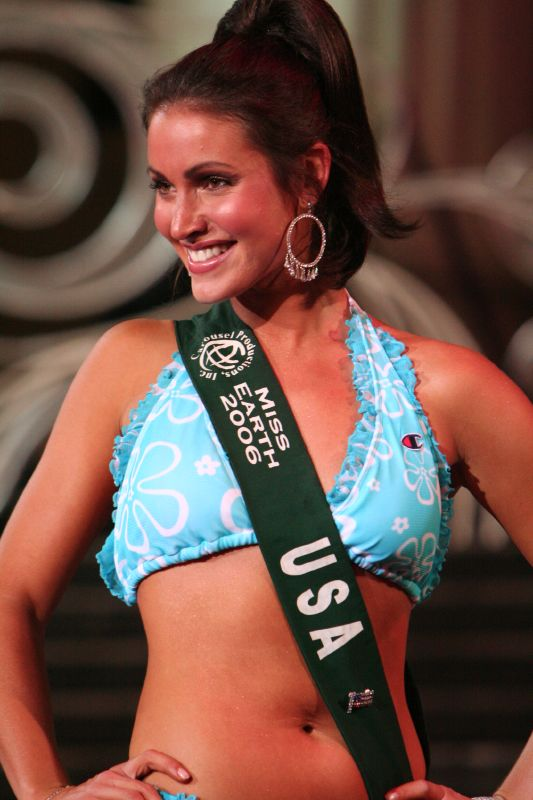
Amanda Pennekamp, Miss South Carolina USA 2004, competing as Miss Earth USA in the swimsuit competition at Miss Earth 2006

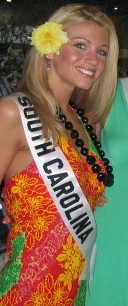
Lacie Lybrand, Miss South Carolina USA 2006

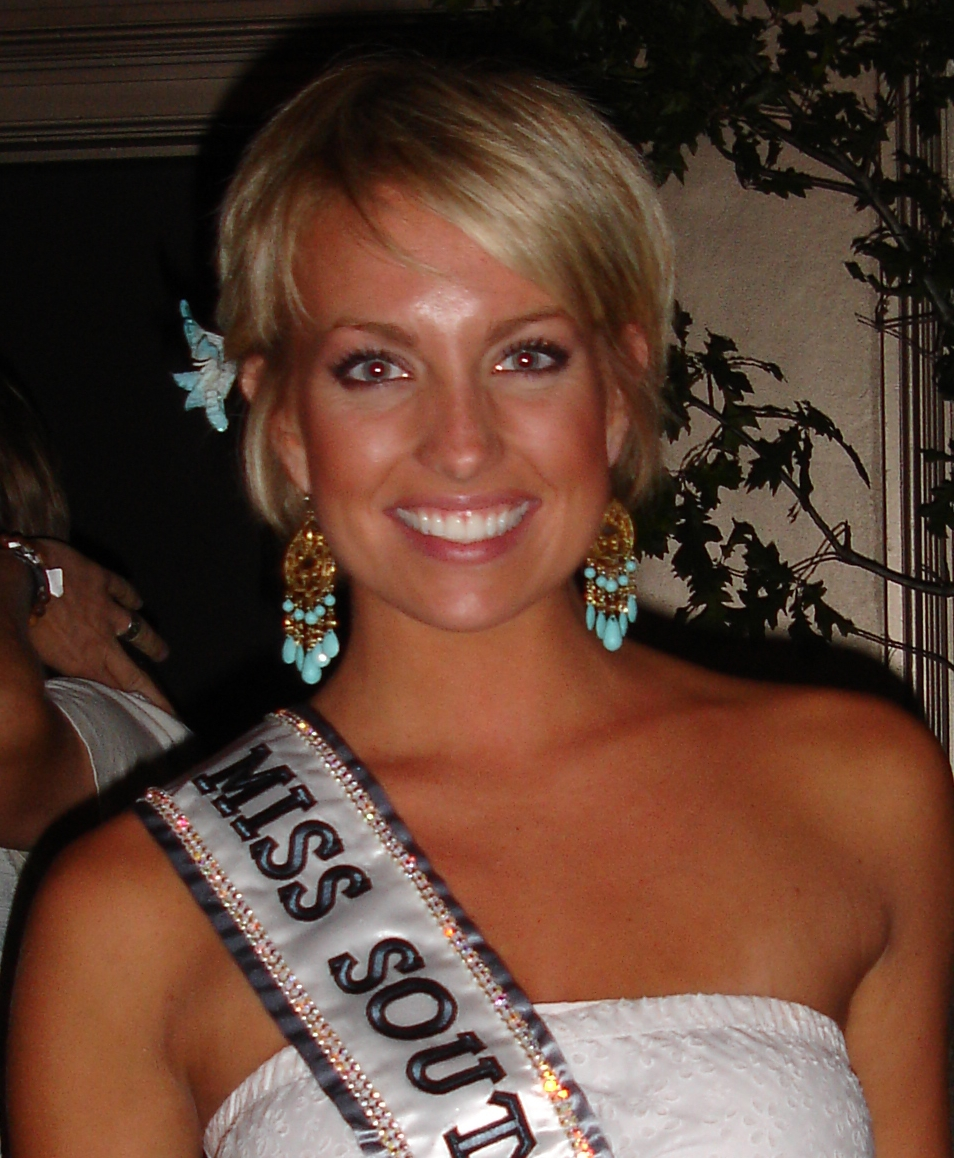
Stephanie Murray Smith, Miss South Carolina USA 2009

== Results summary ==
- Miss USAs: Miriam Stevenson (1954), Shawn Weatherly (1980), Lu Parker (1994)
- 1st runners-up: Mary Kemp Griffin (1953), Betty Cherry (1956), Vickie Chesser (1970), Gina Tolleson (1990), Amanda Pennekamp (2004)
- 2nd runners-up: Eva Engle (1969), Allison Grisso (1983), Audra Wallace (1992)
- 3rd runner-up: Virginia Murray (1976)
- 5th runner-up: Megan Pinckney (2013)
- Top 5/8: Lauren Poppell (1999), Courtney Turner (2011), Megan Gordon (2017), Marley Stokes (2021)
- Top 10/12: Susan Gordon (1972), Maribeth Curry (1986), April Abel (1988), Kelli Gosnell (1993), Lisa Rabon (2000), Ashley Williams (2002), Anna Hanks (2003), Lacie Lybrand (2006), Stephanie Murray Smith (2009), Christina Zapolski (2014)
- Top 15/16/19/20: Susan Anthony Day (1953), Sara Stone (1955), Jean Spotts (1957), Patricia Ann Moss (1958), Cecelia Yoder (1963), Vicki Harrison (1965), Ashley Zais (2007), Jamie Hill (2008), Erika Powell (2012), Leah Lawson (2016), Kirby Elizabeth Self (2023), Gracen Grainger (2024), Gallienne Nabila (2025), Victoria Vesce (2026)

South Carolina holds a record of 41 placements at Miss USA third overall behind Texas and California.

=== Awards ===
- Miss Congeniality: Kiki Kirkland (1973)
- Miss Photogenic: Sonja Glenn (1998)
- Best State Costume: Vicki Chesser (1970), Virginia Murray (1976)
- Best in Swimsuit: Lauren Poppell (1999)

== Winners ==
Color key

- Declared as Winner
- Ended as runner-up
- Ended as one of the finalists or semifinalists

Year	Name	Hometown	Age (Note: Age at the time of the Miss USA pageant)	Local title	Placement at Miss USA	Special awards at Miss USA	Notes
2026	Victoria Vesce	Charleston	33	Miss Low Country	Top 20		
2025	Gallienne Nabila	Greer	28	Miss Greer	Top 20		
2024	Gracen Grainger	Clemson	22	Miss Golden Corner	Top 20		Previously Miss South Carolina Teen USA 2020; Top 16 at Miss Teen USA 2020
2023	Kirby Elizabeth Self	Greenwood	23	Miss Upstate	Top 20		Previously Miss South Carolina Teen USA 2018; First Runner-Up at Miss Teen USA 2018
2022	Meera Bhonslé	Lexington	25	Miss Upstate			
2021	Marley Stokes	Lexington	23	Miss Golden Corner	Top 8		Previously Miss South Carolina Teen USA 2016; 2nd runner-up at Miss Teen USA 2016; Later Miss Supranational USA 2026
2020	Hannah Jane Curry	Greer	20	Miss Greenville			
2019	MaKenzie Divina	Anderson	21	Miss Upstate			Previously Miss South Carolina Teen United States 2016
2018	Victoria Carol "Tori" Sizemore	Anderson	22	Miss Golden Corner			Previously Miss South Carolina Teen USA 2013; 1st runner-up at Miss Teen USA 2013; Later Miss South Carolina Volunteer 2022
2017	Megan Gordon	North Augusta	23	Miss Upstate	Top 5		Later Miss South Carolina World 2019; Later 1st runner-up at Miss World America 2019
2016	Leah Lawson	Laurens	21	Miss Mountain Lakes	Top 15		Auditioned on American Idol season 14 and eliminated during Hollywood Week
2015	Sarah Weishuhn	Goose Creek	20	Miss Summerville			
2014	Christina Zapolski	Charleston	22	Miss Isle of Palms	Top 10		Contestant on Hunted
2013	Megan Tyler Pinckney	North Charleston	21	Miss James Island	5th runner-up		Previously Miss South Carolina Teen USA 2010
2012	Erika Grace Powell	Greenville	26		Top 16		Previously Miss South Carolina 2005; Top 10 at Miss America 2006; Former nanny of Hugh Jackman
2011	Courtney Hope Turner	North Augusta	20		Top 8		Previously Miss United States Teen 2009
2010	Rachel Law	Greenville	21				
2009	Stephanie Murray Smith	Goose Creek	21		Top 10		Contestant on The Amazing Race 17
2008	Jamie Hill	Columbia	24		Top 15		Contestant on The Amazing Race 10
2007	Ashley Derham Zais	Newberry	20		Top 15		Daughter of then Newberry College president Mick Zais
2006	Lacie Lyn Lybrand	Lexington	23		Top 10		Miss United States 2002
2005	Sarah Ashley Medley	North Charleston	18				Previously Miss South Carolina Teen USA 2001
2004	Amanda Helen Pennekamp	Columbia	22		1st runner-up		Later Miss Earth USA 2006; Top 16 semifinalist at Miss Earth 2006
2003	Anna Rebecca Hanks	Belton	21		Top 10		Miss United States 2005
2002	Katherine Ashley Williams	Little Mountain	20		Top 12 (6th)		
2001	Candace Richards	Fountain Inn	24				
2000	Lisa Amy Rabon	Myrtle Beach	21		Top 10 (9th)		
1999	Lauren Poppell	Rock Hill	23		Top 5 (4th)	Best in Swimsuit	Previously Miss South Carolina Teen USA 1993; Top 12 at Miss Teen USA 1993
1998	Sonja Glenn	Chesnee	21			Miss Photogenic	
1997	Casey Cristin Mizell	Irmo	22				
1996	Lysa Jackson	Charleston	19				
1995	Danielle Corley	Lexington	23				
1994	Frances Louise "Lu" Parker	Charleston	26		Miss USA 1994		Top 6 finalist at Miss Universe 1994
1993	Kelli Gosnell	Pacolet	22		Semi-finalist		
1992	Audra Yolanda Wallace	Charleston	22		2nd runner-up		2nd runner-up at Miss World USA 1993
1991	Traci Rufty	Columbia	21				
1990	Gina Marie Tolleson	Spartanburg	20		1st Runner-up		Later Miss World 1990
1989	Angela Christine Shuler	Rock Hill	21				Second runner-up at Miss South Carolina Teen USA 1983; Previously Miss South Carolina Teen USA 1986
1988	April Abel	Johnston	20		Semi-finalist		
1987	Elizabeth "Beth" Woodard	Aiken	21				Previously Miss South Carolina Teen USA 1983
1986	Maribeth Curry	Mauldin	20		Semi-finalist		
1985	Ann Margarete Hughes	Charleston					
1984	Ginger Greer	Lugoff					
1983	Margaret Allison Grisso	Columbia	21		2nd Runner-up		
1982	Margo Mechele Wood	Columbia					
1981	Zade Denise Turner	Myrtle Beach	21				
1980	Shawn Nichols Weatherly	Sumter	20		Miss USA 1980		Miss Universe 1980
1979	Janice McDonald	Myrtle Beach	20				Co-founder of RPM Productions with her sister Paula Miles
1978	Kathryn Marley Threatt	Pickens					
1977	Pam Hoover	Florence					
1976	Virginia Jan Murray	Chester			3rd Runner-up	Best Costume	Flight attendant and survivor of United Airlines Flight 232
1975	Robin Ann Morris	Greenville					
1974	Carol Lynn Hollis	Rock Hill					
1973	Kiki Kirkland	Newberry	21			Congeniality	
1972	Eleanor Susan Gordon	Rock Hill			Semi-finalist		Non-finalist at Miss World USA 1970 representing South Carolina
1971	Eunice Campbell	Eastover					
1970	Vickie Lynn Chesser	Mt. Pleasant	19		1st Runner-up	Best Costume	
1969	Eva Engle	Columbia			2nd Runner-up		
1968	Kathryn "Kay" Knoy						
1967	Lanette Hope Patterson	Cayce	20				
1966	Joselyn Jeanne Alarie	Columbia					
1965	Vicki Jean Harrison	Lexington			Top 15		
1964	Judy Kennedy						
1963	Cecelia McBride Yoder				Top 15		Represented South Carolina in Miss USA World 1963 but did not place.
1962	Judy Clyburn						
1961	Yvonne Quick						
1960	Margaret Ann Thompson						
1959	Mary Ann Powell						
1958	Patricia Ann Moss				Semi-finalist		
1957	Jean Spotts				Semi-finalist		
1956	Betty Lane Cherry	Columbia			1st Runner-up		1st runner-up at Miss World 1956.
1955	Sara Ella Stone				Semi-finalist		
1954	Miriam Jacqueline Stevenson	Winnsboro	20		Miss USA 1954		Miss Universe 1954; Previously Miss South Carolina 1953
1953	Mary Kemp Griffin				1st runner-up		She competed as Myrtle Beach, South Carolina, represented the US at Miss World 1953, and finished as 5th runner-up
1953	Susan Anthony Day				Semi-finalist		
1952	Margie Allen						
