= Carlene King Johnson =

American model

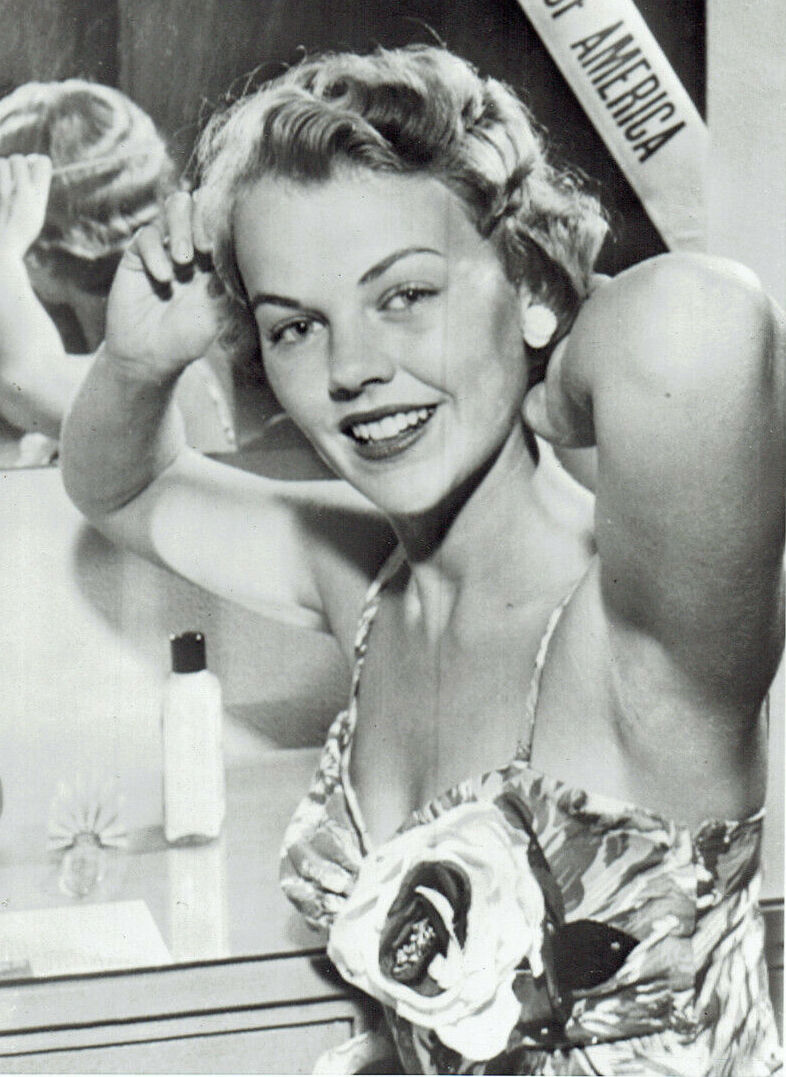
Johnson combing hair before the first day of the Miss Universe 1955 pageant

Carlene King Johnson Drake (May 31, 1933 – April 15, 1969) was an American model and beauty pageant titleholder who won Miss USA 1955.

Johnson was from Rutland, Vermont. She attended Middlebury College, where she was a member of the Nu chapter Sigma Kappa sorority. She was a legacy of Sigma Kappa sorority, as her mother, Katherine King Johnson, was a member of the Alpha Kappa Chapter. She later attended the Forsyth School of Dental Hygiene at Tufts University in Boston, where she was voted Inter Fraternity Council Queen.

She was crowned Miss Vermont 1953 after which she went on to become Miss USA in 1955, Vermont's only representative (as of 2025) to achieve the national title.

Johnson was born to Dr. Norman and Katherine King Johnson. She had two brothers, named Lyman and Raymond E. On December 21, 1957, she married Lawrence Drake. They divorced in April 1966 after she discovered his adultery. On March 21, 1968, she married Don Carroll Holloway.

She died in 1969, at the age of 35, due to complications from diabetes.
