= Miss Universe 1954 =

3rd Miss Universe pageant

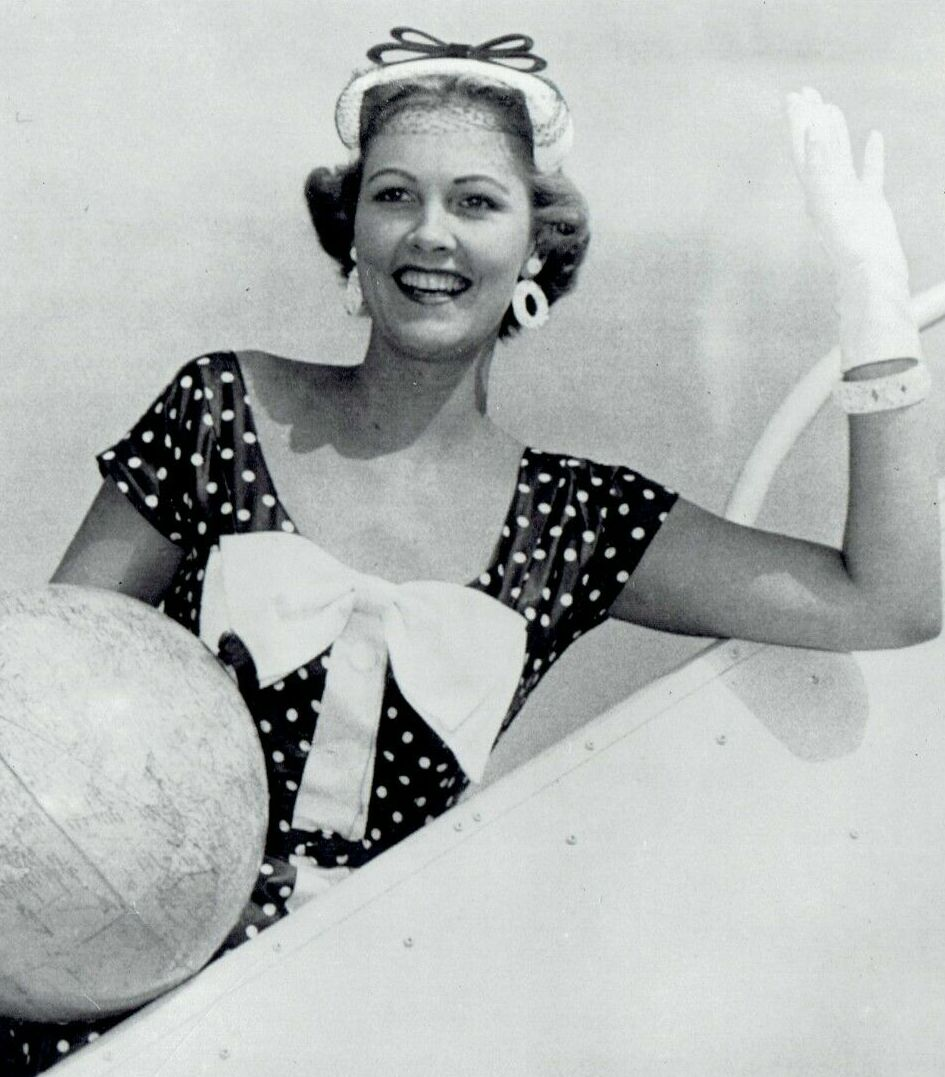
- Miriam Stevenson
- Date: 24 July 1954
- Presenters: Bob Russell
- Venue: Long Beach Municipal Auditorium, Long Beach, California, United States
- Entrants: 33
- Placements: 16
- Debuts: Argentina; Brazil; Costa Rica; El Salvador; Honduras; New Zealand; Singapore; South Korea; Thailand; West Indies
- Withdrawals: Austria; Denmark; Hawaii; South Africa; Switzerland; Turkey; Venezuela
- Returns: Chile; Cuba; Hong Kong; Israel
- Winner: Miriam Stevenson; United States
- Congeniality: Efi Androulakakis (Greece (Note: Efi did not compete for the Miss Universe title))

Miss Universe 1954 was the third Miss Universe pageant, held at the Long Beach Municipal Auditorium in Long Beach, California, on 24 July 1954.

At the conclusion of the event, Christiane Martel of France crowned Miriam Stevenson of the United States as Miss Universe 1954. It was the first victory of the United States in the history of the pageant. Stevenson became the first Miss Universe to concurrently hold both Miss USA and Miss Universe titles.

Contestants from thirty-three countries and territories competed in this year's pageant. The pageant was hosted by Bob Russell. This edition also featured the Star of the Universe crown, which consisted of one-thousand Oriental cultured and black pearls set in solid gold and platinum, and was worth $500,000 USD. This crown would be eventually used for the next six editions.

== Background ==
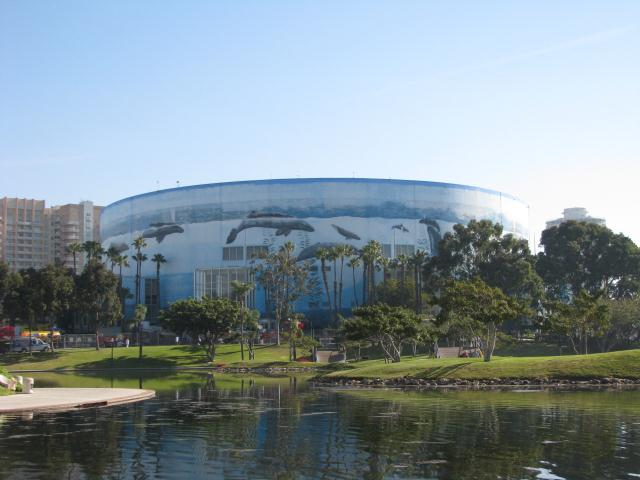
Long Beach Municipal Auditorium, the venue of Miss Universe 1954

=== Selection of participants ===
Contestants from thirty-three countries and territories were selected to compete in the pageant. Two contestants were selected to replace the original dethroned winner.

==== Replacements ====
Sun-hee Kae, first runner-up of Miss Korea 1954, was appointed to replace Miss Korea 1954 Rak Hi Pu after the latter's visa was denied due to alleged communist ties. Similarly, Rika Dialina, Star Hellas 1954, was initially replaced by first runner-up Efi Androulakakis after Dialina posed for a book by a Greek communist, despite having no communist sympathies. However, U.S. Secretary of State John Foster Dulles intervened, allowing Dialina temporary entry. Dialina arrived days before preliminaries, causing Androulakakis to withdraw. Organizers asked Androulakakis to remain as representative of Crete, but she declined. Though not an official candidate, she was still named Miss Friendship. Amara Asavananda, runner-up of Miss Thailand 1953, replaced Miss Thailand 1953 Anong Atchawatthana due to financial issues.

==== Debuts, returns, and withdrawals ====
The 1954 edition saw the debuts of Argentina, Brazil, Costa Rica, El Salvador, Honduras, New Zealand, Singapore, South Korea, Thailand, and the West Indies, and the returns of Chile, Cuba, Hong Kong, and Israel, which last competed in 1952.

Gertrude Kapi'olani Miller of Hawaii withdrew due to undisclosed reasons. Berta Elena Landaeta of Venezuela also withdrew after pageant organizers were unable to determine her whereabouts. Austria, Denmark, South Africa, Switzerland, and Turkey withdrew after their respective organizations failed to hold a national competition or designate a contestant.

Contestants from Guatemala and Nicaragua were expected to compete but were prohibited by their respective governments due to political instability in Central America. Both countries debuted in the following edition.

== Results ==
=== Placements ===
Placement	Contestant
Miss Universe 1954	United States – Miriam Stevenson
1st Runner-Up	Brazil – Martha Rocha
2nd Runner-Up	Hong Kong – Virginia Lee
3rd Runner-Up	West Germany – Regina Ernst
4th Runner-Up	Sweden – Ragnhild Olausson
Top 16	Argentina – Ivana Kislinger; Chile – Gloria Leguisos; Costa Rica – Marian Esquivel; France – Jacqueline Beer; Greece – Rika Dialina; Italy – Maria Paliani; Norway – Mona Stornes; Panama – Liliana Torre; Peru – Isabella Dancourt; Philippines – Blesilda Ocampo; Uruguay – Ana Moreno

=== Special awards ===
Award	Contestant
Miss Friendship	Greece – Efi Androulakakis
Miss Popular Girl	Brazil – Martha Rocha

== Pageant ==
=== Format ===
Same with 1953, sixteen semi-finalists were chosen at the preliminary competition that consists of the swimsuit and evening gown competition. Each of the sixteen semi-finalists gave a short speech during the final telecast using their native languages. Afterwards, the sixteen semi-finalists paraded again in their swimsuits and evening gowns, and the five finalists were eventually chosen.

=== Selection committee ===
- Piper Laurie – American actress
- Julia Adams – American actress
- Suzan Ball – American actress
- Earl Wilson – American columnist and journalist
- Tom Kelley – American photographer

== Contestants ==
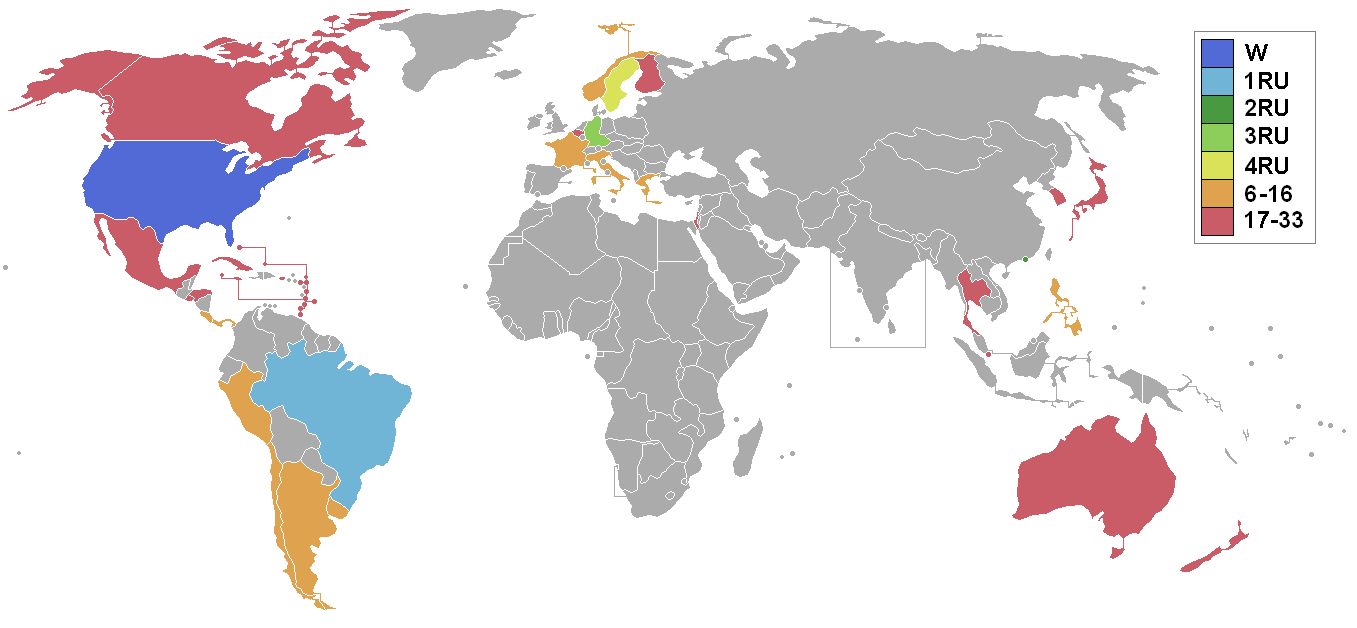
Miss Universe 1954 participating countries and territories

Thirty-three contestants competed for the title.

Country/Territory	Contestant	Age (Note: Ages at the time of the pageant)	Hometown
Alaska	Charlein Lander	18	Fairbanks
Argentina	Ivana Kislinger	22	Temperley
Australia	Shirley Bliss	20	Narrandera
Belgium	Christiane Neckaerts	19	Nodebais
Brazil	Martha Rocha	21	Salvador
Canada	Joyce Landry	20	Toronto
Chile	Gloria Leguisos	21	Santiago
Costa Rica	Marian Esquivel	18	San José
Cuba	Isis Finlay	20	Havana
El Salvador	Myrna Orozco	20	San Salvador
Finland	Lenita Airisto	18	Helsinki
France	Jacqueline Beer	21	Bois-Colombes
Greece	Rika Dialina	22	Heraklion
Honduras	Lilliam Padilla	21	Tegucigalpa
Hong Kong	Virginia Lee	20	Hong Kong
Israel	Aviva Pe'er	18	Tel-Aviv
Italy	Maria Paliani	18	Rome
Japan	Mieko Kondo	18	Nagoya
Mexico	Elvira Castillo	19	Mexico City
New Zealand	Moana Manley	18	Auckland
Norway	Mona Stornes	19	Oslo
Panama	Liliana Torre	18	Panama City
Peru	Isabella Dancourt	18	Lima
Philippines	Blesilda Ocampo	18	Manila
Puerto Rico	Lucy Santiago	23	San Juan
Singapore	Marjorie Wee	21	Singapore
South Korea	Sun-hee Kae	19	Seoul
Sweden	Ragnhild Olausson	19	Stockholm
Thailand	Amara Asavananda	18	Phra Nakhon
United States	Miriam Stevenson	21	Winnsboro
Uruguay	Ana Moreno	22	Montevideo
West Germany	Regina Ernst	18	Bremen
West Indies	Evelyn Andrade	18	Kingston
