= Miss Puerto Rico's Outstanding Teen =

Miss Puerto Rico's Teen
- Type: Beauty pageant
- Members: Miss America's Teen
- Official language: Spanish and English
- Website: misspuertorico.org

The Miss Puerto Rico's Teen competition is the pageant that selects the representative for the country of Puerto Rico in the Miss America's Teen pageant.

Natalie Scott Gonzalez of Dorado was crowned Miss Puerto Rico's Teen on May 3, 2026, at the Blanca Ballroom at Treasure Island Hotel & Villas in Cidra. She competed for the title of Miss America's Teen 2027 on September 5, 2026, at the Kravis Center for the Performing Arts in West Palm Beach, Florida.

In January 2023, the official name of the pageant was changed from Miss Puerto Rico’s Outstanding Teen, to Miss Puerto Rico’s Teen, in accordance with the national pageant.

== Results summary ==
The year in parentheses indicates the year of the Miss America's Teen competition the award/placement.

=== Awards ===
==== Other awards ====
- Miss Photogenic: Daniela Sofia Ramirez (2014)

== Winners ==
Year	Name	Hometown	Age	Local Title	Talent	Placement at MAO Teen	Special scholarships at MAO Teen	Notes
2026	Natalie Scott Gonzalez	Dorado	17	Miss Dorado's Teen	Tenor Steel Drum			
2025	Ishtar Daneliz Colón-Vargas	Barceloneta	18	Miss Barceloneta's Teen	Acting Monologue			
2024	Azahara Anaid Rosado González	San Juan	16	Miss San Juan's Teen	Dance (Ballet en Pointe) - Verde Luz			
2023	Did not send representative between 2016 and 2019 for the 2017 to 2020 contests, and has not since 2021 for the 2022 contest and onwards. No contest in 2020 for Miss America's Teen 2021 due to the COVID-19 pandemic.							
2022	Did not send representative between 2016 and 2019 for the 2017 to 2020 contests, and has not since 2021 for the 2022 contest and onwards. No contest in 2020 for Miss America's Teen 2021 due to the COVID-19 pandemic.							
2021	Did not send representative between 2016 and 2019 for the 2017 to 2020 contests, and has not since 2021 for the 2022 contest and onwards. No contest in 2020 for Miss America's Teen 2021 due to the COVID-19 pandemic.							
2020	Did not send representative between 2016 and 2019 for the 2017 to 2020 contests, and has not since 2021 for the 2022 contest and onwards. No contest in 2020 for Miss America's Teen 2021 due to the COVID-19 pandemic.							
2019	Did not send representative between 2016 and 2019 for the 2017 to 2020 contests, and has not since 2021 for the 2022 contest and onwards. No contest in 2020 for Miss America's Teen 2021 due to the COVID-19 pandemic.							
2018	Did not send representative between 2016 and 2019 for the 2017 to 2020 contests, and has not since 2021 for the 2022 contest and onwards. No contest in 2020 for Miss America's Teen 2021 due to the COVID-19 pandemic.							
2017	Did not send representative between 2016 and 2019 for the 2017 to 2020 contests, and has not since 2021 for the 2022 contest and onwards. No contest in 2020 for Miss America's Teen 2021 due to the COVID-19 pandemic.							
2016	Did not send representative between 2016 and 2019 for the 2017 to 2020 contests, and has not since 2021 for the 2022 contest and onwards. No contest in 2020 for Miss America's Teen 2021 due to the COVID-19 pandemic.							
2015	Tanysha Acevedo	Bayamón				N/A		
2014	Victoria Violeta	Dorado	17	Miss Dorado's Outstanding Teen				
2013	Daniela Sofia Ramirez	San German	16	Miss San German's Outstanding Teen			Miss Photogenic	
2012	Dayaneira Figueroa Ballester	Mayaguez	15	Miss Mayaguez's Outstanding Teen				
2011	Aylín Marí Torres	Bayamón	15	Miss Bayamón's Outstanding Teen				
2010	Mónica Cristina Arias	Toa Baja	17	Miss Toa Baja's Outstanding Teen				
2009	Did not send representative							
2008	Did not send representative							
2007	Did not send representative							
2006	Did not send representative							
2005	Did not send representative							
