= Miss America's Teen =

Scholarship pageant

- Type: Beauty pageant
- Parent organization: Miss America Organization
- Headquarters: Wellington, Florida
- Country represented: United States
- First edition: 2006
- Most recent edition: 2027
- Current titleholder: Elle Anderson; Utah
- CEO: Robin Ross-Fleming
- Formerly called: Miss America's Outstanding Teen
- Language: English
- Website: missamerica.org

Miss America's Teen is an American scholarship pageant. It is the sister program to the Miss America opportunity, and it aims to "promote scholastic achievement, creative accomplishment, healthy living and community involvement for America's teens." As of September 5, 2026, Elle Anderson of Utah holds the esteemed title. To be eligible to compete, participants must first compete and win at the local level and then win the state title. The competition consists of several parts of competition which consists of an eight-minute interview in front of a panel of judges, talent, lifestyle and wellness, evening wear, and an on-stage question. All competitors must be girls between the ages of 14 and 18 years of age.

More than $113,000 in scholarship grants were distributed among the 51 contestants in the pageant along with $29 million in in-kind tuition with 7 universities, with a $30,000 scholarship being awarded to the winner. The chairwoman for the Miss America's Teen program is Miss America CEO, Robin Fleming.

In January 2023 the official name of the pageant was changed from Miss America's Outstanding Teen to Miss America's Teen.

The current titleholder is Elle Anderson of Utah, who was crowned on September 5, 2026, at the Kravis Center for the Performing Arts in West Palm Beach, Florida.

== History ==
The first competition was held in August 2005 in the Linda W. Chapin Theater at the Orange County Convention Center in Orlando, Florida. Meghan Miller, who represented Texas, was the first to win the competition.

== Winners ==
Year	Crowned	Winner	State	City	Age	Awards	Talent	Notes
2006	August 20, 2005	Meghan Miller	Texas	Beaumont	17	Overall Talent Award Preliminary Evening Wear/OSQ Award Preliminary Talent Award	Ventriloquism	Off-Broadway actress in The Berenstain Bears LIVE! And national tour casts of Berenstain Bears and John Tartaglia's ImaginOcean; Appeared on America's Got Talent
2007	August 19, 2006	Maria DeSantis	(New York (state)) New York	Staten Island	17	Preliminary Talent Award	Vocal	Contestant at National Sweetheart 2012 pageant
2008	August 11, 2007	Caitlin Brunell	Virginia	Great Falls	15	Preliminary Evening Wear/OSQ Award	En Pointe Dance, "Show Off" from The Drowsy Chaperone	Daughter of former New Orleans Saints quarterback, Mark Brunell; Later Miss Alabama 2014; Top 10 at Miss America 2015 pageant; Judge at Miss America's Outstanding Teen 2020
2009	August 16, 2008	Taylor Fitch	South Carolina	Anderson	17		Musical Theater Dance	
2010	August 15, 2009	Jeanette Morelan	Wisconsin	Racine	15		Vocal, "Think of Me" from The Phantom of the Opera	Sister of Miss Wisconsin's Outstanding Teen 2013, JamieNicole Morelan; Later Distinguished Young Woman of Wisconsin 2012; 4th runner-up at Miss Tennessee 2016 pageant
2011	August 28, 2010	Lacey Russ	Oklahoma	Cordell	16	Preliminary Evening Wear/OSQ Award	Piano, Bach's "Prelude XXI" and Beethoven's "Sonata Pathetique"	
2012	August 20, 2011	Elizabeth Fechtel	Florida	Leesburg	17	Preliminary Evening Wear/OSQ Award	Musical Theater Jazz Dance, "I Am What I Am"	Sister of Miss Florida's Outstanding Teen 2010 and Miss Florida 2015, Mary Katherine Fechtel; Initially named Miss Florida 2014; Later dethroned from Miss Florida title after tabulation error, making her the 1st runner-up
2013	August 18, 2012	Rachel Wyatt	South Carolina	Piedmont	17		Dance	Later Miss South Carolina 2016; 1st runner-up at Miss America 2017 pageant; Former NFL cheerleader for the Dallas Cowboys
2014	August 17, 2013	Leah Sykes	Florida	Jacksonville	16		Vocal, "Someone Like You" by Adele	
2015	August 2, 2014	Olivia McMillan	(Georgia (U.S. state)) Georgia	Centerville	17	Outstanding Vocalist Award Preliminary Talent Award	Classical Vocal, "Nessun dorma" from Puccini's opera, Turandot	
2016	August 1, 2015	Allie Nault	New Hampshire	Gilford	17	Preliminary Evening Wear/OSQ Award Teens in Action Award	Dance/Twirl	
2017	August 6, 2016	Nicole Jia	Oklahoma	Oklahoma City	17	Outstanding Instrumentalist Award	Piano, Variations on Mozart's "Rondo Alla Turca"	
2018	July 29, 2017	Jessica Baeder	Alabama	Auburn	17	Teens in Action Award Preliminary Talent Award	Ballet en pointe, "Boogie Woogie Bugle Boy"	Daughter of Miss North Carolina 1984, Francesca Adler
2019	July 28, 2018	London Hibbs	Texas	Tyler	17	Preliminary Evening Wear/OSQ Award Preliminary Talent Award	Vocal, "Think of Me" from The Phantom of the Opera	
2020	July 27, 2019	Payton May	(Washington (state)) Washington	Vancouver	17	Preliminary Evening Wear/OSQ Award	Vocal, "Over the Rainbow"	Held title for two years since no competition was held in 2020
2021	No national pageant was held due to the COVID-19 pandemic							
2022	July 30, 2021	Marcelle LeBlanc	Alabama	Birmingham	18	Teens in Action Finalist Preliminary Talent Award Top Interview Award (tie)	Broadway Vocal, "On My Own" from Les Miserables	Sister of Miss Alabama Teen USA 2024, Ava LeBlanc; Actress; had roles in Fear Street Part Two: 1978, Stranger Things season 2, Grey's Anatomy, and Criminal Minds.
2023	August 12, 2022	Morgan Greco	(Washington (state)) Washington	Camas	16	Preliminary Talent Award Top Vocalist Award	Operatic Vocal, "The Jewel Song" from Faust	Later crowned Miss Teen International USA 2024
2024	January 13, 2024	Hanley House	North Carolina	Cleveland	16	Preliminary Fitness Award Preliminary Evening Wear	Lyrical Dance, "Don't Stop Believing"	
2025	January 4, 2025	Peyton Bolling	Arkansas	Rogers	17		Jazz Dance, "Man of La Mancha"	Held title for nine months
2026	September 6, 2025	Tess Ferm	South Carolina	Charleston	18	Teens in Action Winner	Vocal, "Tomorrow" from Annie	Previously Miss South Carolina Teen Volunteer 2023, 3rd runner-up at Miss Teen Volunteer America 2024
2027	September 5, 2026	Elle Anderson	Utah	American Fork	18	Preliminary Evening Gown Award Preliminary Talent Award	Violin	

== Winners by state ==
State	Number of Titles Won	Year(s) Won
South Carolina	3	2009, 2013, 2026
Alabama	2	2018, 2022
Florida	2	2012, 2014
Oklahoma	2	2011, 2017
Texas	2	2006, 2019
Washington	2	2020, 2023
Utah	1	2027
Arkansas	1	2025
North Carolina	1	2024
Georgia	1	2015
New Hampshire	1	2016
New York	1	2007
Virginia	1	2008
Wisconsin	1	2010

=== States have yet to win Miss America's Teen ===
There have been no Miss America's Teen winners from the following states:

- Alaska
- Arizona
- California
- Colorado
- Connecticut
- District of Columbia
- Delaware
- Hawaii
- Idaho
- Illinois
- Indiana
- Iowa
- Kansas
- Kentucky
- Louisiana
- Maine
- Maryland
- Massachusetts
- Michigan
- Minnesota
- Mississippi
- Missouri
- Montana
- Nebraska
- Nevada
- New Jersey
- New Mexico
- North Dakota
- Ohio
- Oregon
- Pennsylvania
- Puerto Rico
- Rhode Island
- South Dakota
- Tennessee
- Vermont
- West Virginia
- Wyoming

== See also ==
- Miss Teen USA
- Miss Teenage America
- Miss Teen America
- Distinguished Young Women (formerly America's Junior Miss)
