= Miss America's Outstanding Teen 2016 =

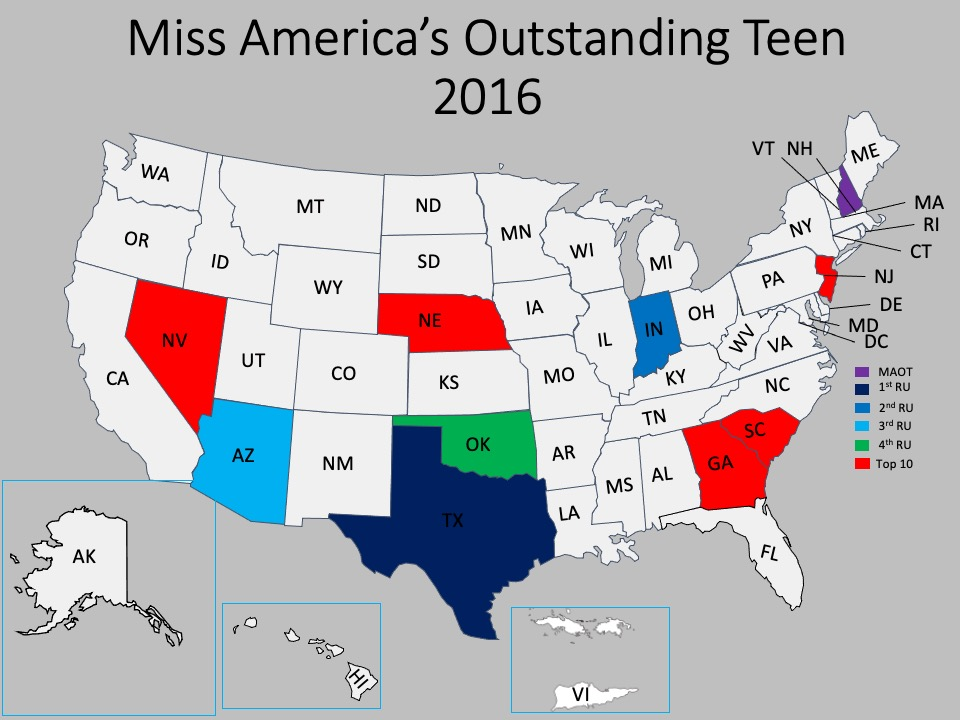
- Miss America's Outstanding Teen 2016 Participants and Results
- Date: August 1, 2015
- Presenters: Greg Hutson and Kira Kazantsev
- Venue: Linda Chapin Theater
- Entrants: 52
- Placements: 10
- Withdrawals: Puerto Rico
- Winner: Allie Nault; New Hampshire

Miss America's Outstanding Teen 2016 was the 10th Miss America's Outstanding Teen pageant held at the Linda Chapin Theater in the Orange County Convention Center in Orlando, Florida on August 1, 2015. At the conclusion of the event, Olivia McMillan of Georgia crowned her successor Allie Nault of New Hampshire. The pageant was hosted by Miss America 2015 Kira Kazantsev and Greg Hutson.

== Results ==
=== Placements ===
Final results	Contestant(s)
Miss America's Outstanding Teen 2016	New Hampshire – Allie Nault
1st Runner-Up	Texas – Addyson Jackson
2nd Runner-Up	Indiana – Audrey Ferguson
3rd Runner-Up	Arizona – Jessi Gradillas
4th Runner-Up	Oklahoma – Carrigan Bradley
Top 10	Georgia – Victoria Smith; Nebraska – Steffany Lien; Nevada – Lauren Watson §; New Jersey – Shereen Pimentel; South Carolina – Sarah Hamrick

§ America's Choice

== Awards ==
=== Preliminary awards ===
Awards	Contestants
Evening Wear and On-Stage Question	Arizona - Jessi Gradillas; New Hampshire - Allie Nault; South Carolina - Sarah Hamrick
Talent	Arizona - Jessi Gradillas; Arkansas - Gracie Stover; New Jersey - Shereen Pimentel

==== Non-finalist awards ====
Awards	Contestant(s)
Non-finalist Evening Wear and On-Stage Question	Arkansas - Gracie Stover
Non-finalist Interview	New York - Alisa Vasquez
Non-finalist Talent	Pennsylvania - Samantha Renck

==== Talent awards ====
Awards	Contestant(s)
Outstanding Dance Talent	Arkansas - Gracie Stover; Pennsylvania - Samantha Renck; West Virginia - Braelynn Neely
Outstanding Instrumental Talent	Iowa - Nina Yu; Virginia - Hayley Boland
Outstanding Vocal Talent	New Jersey - Shereen Pimentel

==== Children's Miracle Network (CMN) National Miracle Maker awards ====
Results	Contestant
Winner	Louisiana - Julia Claire Williams
Finalists	Pennsylvania - Samantha Renck; South Carolina - Sarah Hamrick; Washington - Abigail Dominguiano

==== Teens in Action award ====
Results	Contestant
Winner	New Hampshire - Allie Nault
Finalists	Arkansas - Gracie Stover; Florida - Leah Roddenberry; Minnesota - Rachel Weyandt; Pennsylvania - Samantha Renck; Virginia - Hayley Boland

==== Other awards ====
Awards	Contestant(s)
Miss Congeniality/Spirit of America	New York - Alisa Vasquez
America's Choice	Nevada - Lauren Watson
Outstanding Achievement in Academic Life	Virginia - Hayley Boland
Scholastic Excellence	South Carolina - Sarah Hamrick

== Contestants ==
Year	Name	Hometown	Age	Local Title	Talent	Placement at MAO Teen	Special scholarships at MAO Teen	Notes
Alabama	Kaitlynn Campbell	Hayden	17	At-Large	Vocal, "Concrete Angel"			
Alaska	Elle Adkins	Eagle River	16	Miss Chugiak/Eagle River's Outstanding Teen	Acrobatic Dance			Daughter of Holly Salo Adkins, Miss Alaska 1990 Later Distinguished Young Woman of Alaska 2017 Later inherited the Miss Alaska 2021 title after Emma Broyles was crowned Miss America 2022
Arizona	Jessi Gradillas	Chandler	17	Miss Grand Canyon's Outstanding Teen	Vocal/Guitar	3rd runner-up	Preliminary Evening Wear/OSQ Award Preliminary Talent Award	
Arkansas	Gracie Stover	Little Rock	17	Miss Ouachita River's Outstanding Teen	Tap Dance		Non-finalist Evening Wear/OSQ Award Outstanding Dance Talent Award Preliminary Talent Award Teens in Action Award Finalist	
California	Avery Grooms	Fresno	17	Miss Sierra Nevada's Outstanding Teen				
Colorado	Maggie O'Grady		15	Miss Northern Colorado's Outstanding Teen				
Connecticut	Sapna Raghavan	Ellington	17	Miss Greater Rockville's Outstanding Teen	Bollywood Dance			Later Miss Connecticut 2021
Delaware	Michelle Ley	Wilmington	16	Miss New Castle County's Outstanding Teen	Vocal			
(Washington, D.C.) District of Columbia	Jade Allysee Parchment	Washington D.C.	15					
Florida	Leah Roddenberry	Bradenton	16	Miss Orlando's Outstanding Teen	Dance		Teens in Action Award Finalist	First to hold a state MAOT title twice 1st runner-up at Miss Florida 2019 competition Later Miss Florida 2021
(Georgia (U.S. state)) Georgia	Victoria Smith	Sandersville	17	Miss Macon's Outstanding Teen	Tap Dance, "Ease On down the Road" from The Wiz	Top 10		
Hawaii	Kealani Tanizaki-Hudson		16					
Idaho	Abigail Kunz	Rigby	16	Miss Southeastern Idaho's Outstanding Teen				
Illinois	Peyton Tucker		17	Miss Windy City's Outstanding Teen	Vocal			
Indiana	Audrey Ferguson	Evansville	17	Miss Central Indiana's Outstanding Teen	Vocal	2nd runner-up		
Iowa	Nina Yu	Cedar Rapids	17	Miss Metro's Outstanding Teen			Outstanding Instrumental Talent Award	
Kansas	Ashley Pringle	Yates Center	17	Miss Hay Capital's Outstanding Teen	Vocal			
Kentucky	Kennedy Sabharwal	Lexington	15	Miss Renfro Valley's Outstanding Teen				
Louisiana	Julia Claire Williams	Kinder	16	Miss Holiday in Dixie's Outstanding Teen	Dance		CMN Miracle Maker Award	Later Miss Louisiana 2021
Maine	Alexis Wintle		17					
Maryland	Jessica Bayuk	Frederick	17	Miss Western Maryland's Outstanding Teen				
Massachusetts	Alexandra Berube	Methuen	17	Miss Boston's Outstanding Teen				
Michigan	Vanessa Chambe	St. Clair Shores	16	Miss Downriver's Outstanding Teen				
Minnesota	Rachel Weyandt		16	Miss Chain of Lakes' Outstanding Teen			Teens in Action Award Finalist	
Mississippi	Grace Post	Madison	16	Miss Central Mississippi's Outstanding Teen				
Missouri	Alexis Piskulic	Arnold	15	Miss River City's Outstanding Teen	Dance/Twirl, "A Brand New Day"			"Silver Twin" in Purdue University's "All-American" Marching Band
Montana	Katee Orr	Missoula	17					
Nebraska	Steffany Lien	Omaha	17	Miss Douglas County's Outstanding Teen	Baton Twirling, "Hollywood" by Michael Bublé	Top 10		Six-time world champion baton twirler Later University of Louisville's Cardinal Girl Feature Twirler Later Miss Nebraska 2022
Nevada	Lauren Watson	Las Vegas	16	Miss Lake Mead's Outstanding Teen		Top 10	People's Choice Award	Previously Miss American Teenager Junior 2013
New Hampshire	Allie Nault	Gilford	17	Miss Lakes Region's Outstanding Teen	Dance/Twirl	Winner	Preliminary Evening Wear/OSQ Award Teens in Action Award	
New Jersey	Shereen Pimentel	Teaneck	17	Miss Cape Shores' Outstanding Teen	Vocal, "Finding Wonderland"	Top 10	Outstanding Vocal Talent Award Preliminary Talent Award	
New Mexico	Sasha Butcher	Albuquerque	15	Miss Las Vegas' Outstanding Teen				
(New York (state)) New York	Alisa Vasquez	Washingtonville	17	Miss Upstate New York's Outstanding Teen			Non-finalist Interview Award Spirit of America Award	
North Carolina	McKenzie Hansley	Hampstead	16	Miss Spivey's Corner's Outstanding Teen				Later Miss North Carolina Teen USA 2017
North Dakota	Olivia Larson			Miss Bismarck's Outstanding Teen				
Ohio	Emily Krejci	North Royalton	15	Miss Maple City's Outstanding Teen				
Oklahoma	Carrigan Bradley		16	Miss Edmond Liberty Fest's Outstanding Teen	Vocal, "That's Life" by Frank Sinatra	4th runner-up		4th runner-up at Miss Oklahoma 2017 pageant
Oregon	Hailey Kilgore	Happy Valley	16	Miss Happy Valley's Outstanding Teen	Vocal, "Not For the Life of Me", from Thoroughly Modern Millie			Previously National American Miss Oregon Pre-Teen Later cast as Ti Moune in the 2018 Broadway revival of Once on This Island Nominated for 2018 Tony Award for Best Actress in a Musical for this role
Pennsylvania	Samantha Renck	Newtown	17	Miss Philadelphia's Outstanding Teen	Lyrical Dance		CMN Miracle Maker Award Finalist Non-finalist Talent Award Outstanding Dance Talent Award Teens in Action Award Finalist	
Rhode Island	Catarina Girardi	Cranston	16	Miss Cranston's Outstanding Teen	Dance			
South Carolina	Sarah Hamrick	Cowpens	17	Miss Hilton Head Island Teen	Vocal, "Live Out Loud"	Top 10	CMN Miracle Maker Award Finalist Preliminary Evening Wear/OSQ Award Scholastic Excellence Award	Later contestant on season 26 of The Bachelor
South Dakota	Cameron Schroder	Huron	17	Miss Sioux Empire's Outstanding Teen				
Tennessee	Allie Privitt	Humboldt	16	Miss Henderson County's Outstanding Teen	Acro-Jazz Lyrical Dance			
Texas	Addyson Jackson	Frisco	16	Miss Plano's Outstanding Teen	Dance	1st runner-up		
Utah	Savannah Sorensen		16	Miss Central Utah's Outstanding Teen				Older sister of Charlee Sorensen, Miss Utah's Outstanding Teen 2020
Vermont	Sophia Parker		16					
Virginia	Hayley Boland	Troutville	17	Miss Roanoke Valley's Outstanding Teen	Piano, "Solfeggietto" by Carl Philipp Emanuel Bach		Academic Achievement Award Outstanding Instrumental Talent Award Teens in Action Award Finalist	
(United States Virgin Islands) Virgin Islands	Keshaundia Quinn		15					
(Washington (state)) Washington	Abigail Dominguiano	Bremerton	15	Miss Great Peninsula's Outstanding Teen	Musical Theater Vocal		CMN Miracle Maker Award Finalist	
West Virginia	Braelynn Neely			Miss University City's Outstanding Teen	Dance/Twirl		Outstanding Dance Talent Award	
Wisconsin	Jordenne Butler	Onalaska	16	Miss River City's Outstanding Teen	Lyrical Dance, Glee cover of "I Dreamed a Dream" from Les Misérables			
Wyoming	Olivia Boley	Sheridan	15					
