= Miss America's Teen state pageants =

Beauty pageants

Miss America's Teen pageants select the representative for each state for the Miss America's Teen pageant.

Although Miss America state pageants used to run unofficial teen competitions, Miss America's Outstanding Teen was the first official teen pageant associated with the Miss America Organization and the first for which there was a national competition. The first national pageant was held in August 2005 at the Orange County Convention Center in Orlando, Florida. In January 2023 the name was shorten to Miss America's Teen.

As this is the teen version of the Miss America pageant, there has never been a swimwear component of the competition: contestants compete in interview, evening wear, active wear, and talent.

== Alabama ==
See Miss Alabama's Teen

== Alaska ==
See Miss Alaska's Teen

== Arizona ==
See Miss Arizona's Teen

== Arkansas ==
See Miss Arkansas' Teen

== California ==
See Miss California's Teen

== Colorado ==
See Miss Colorado's Teen

== Connecticut ==
See Miss Connecticut's Teen

== Delaware ==
See Miss Delaware's Teen

== District of Columbia ==
See Miss District of Columbia's Teen

== Florida ==
See Miss Florida's Teen

== Georgia ==
See Miss Georgia's Teen

== Hawaii ==
See Miss Hawaii's Teen

== Idaho ==
See Miss Idaho's Teen

== Illinois ==
See Miss Illinois' Teen

== Indiana ==
See Miss Indiana's Teen

== Iowa ==
See Miss Iowa's Teen

== Kansas ==
See Miss Kansas' Teen

== Kentucky ==
See Miss Kentucky's Teen

== Louisiana ==
See Miss Louisiana's Teen

== Maine ==
See Miss Maine's Teen

== Maryland ==
See Miss Maryland's Teen

== Massachusetts ==
See Miss Massachusetts' Teen

== Michigan ==
See Miss Michigan's Teen

== Minnesota ==
See Miss Minnesota's Teen

== Mississippi ==
See Miss Mississippi's Teen

== Missouri ==
See Miss Missouri's Teen

== Montana ==
See Miss Montana's Teen

== Nebraska ==
See Miss Nebraska's Teen

== Nevada ==
See Miss Nevada's Teen

== New Hampshire ==
See Miss New Hampshire's Teen

== New Jersey ==
See Miss New Jersey's Teen

== New Mexico ==
See Miss New Mexico's Teen

== New York ==
See Miss New York's Teen

== North Carolina ==
See Miss North Carolina's Teen

== North Dakota ==
See Miss North Dakota's Teen

== Ohio ==
See Miss Ohio's Teen

== Oklahoma ==
See Miss Oklahoma's Teen

== Oregon ==
See Miss Oregon's Teen

== Pennsylvania ==
See Miss Pennsylvania's Teen

== Puerto Rico ==
See Miss Puerto Rico's Outstanding Teen

== Rhode Island ==
See Miss Rhode Island's Teen

== South Carolina ==
See Miss South Carolina Teen

== South Dakota ==
See Miss South Dakota's Teen

== Tennessee ==
See Miss Tennessee's Teen

== Texas ==
See Miss Texas' Teen

== Utah ==
See Miss Utah's Teen

== Vermont ==
See Miss Vermont's Teen

== Virginia ==
See Miss Virginia's Teen

== Virgin Islands ==
See Miss Virgin Islands' Outstanding Teen

== Washington ==
See Miss Washington's Teen

== West Virginia ==
See Miss West Virginia's Teen

== Wisconsin ==
See Miss Wisconsin's Teen

== Wyoming ==
See Miss Wyoming's Teen

== General references ==
- "Previous State Titleholders". maoteen.org. Miss America's Outstanding Teen.
