= Miss America's Outstanding Teen 2014 =

Beauty pageant edition

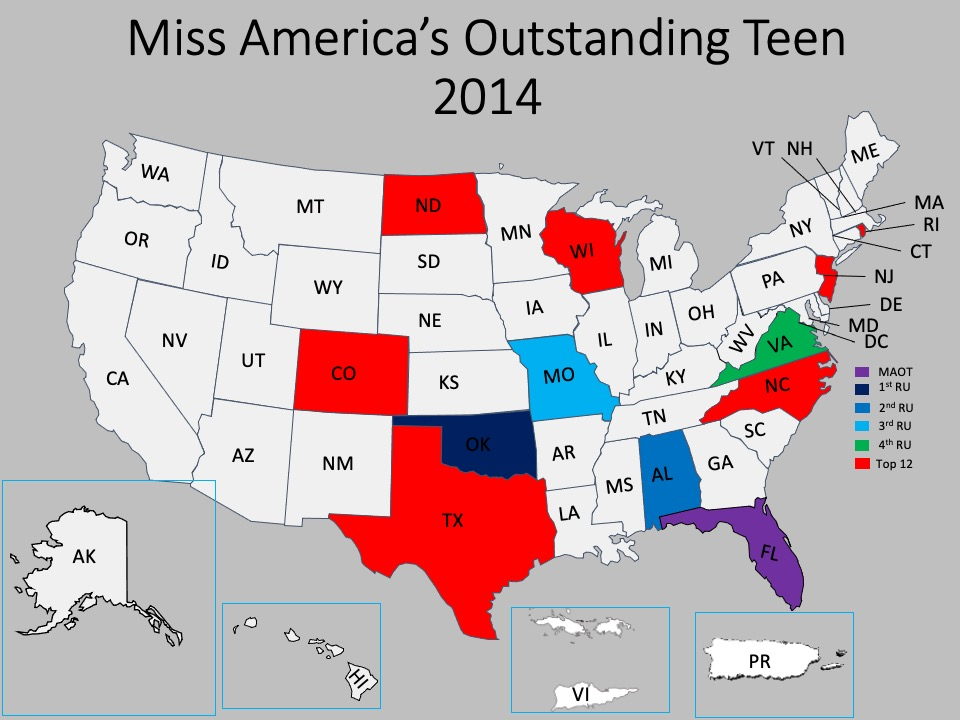
- Miss America's Outstanding Teen 2014 Participants and Results
- Date: August 17, 2013
- Presenters: Mallory Hytes Hagen
- Venue: Linda Chapin Theater
- Entrants: 52
- Placements: 12
- Winner: Leah Sykes; Florida

Miss America's Outstanding Teen 2014 was the 8th Miss America's Outstanding Teen pageant held at the Linda Chapin Theater in the Orange County Convention Center in Orlando, Florida on August 17, 2013. At the conclusion of the event, Rachel Wyatt of South Carolina crowned her successor Leah Sykes of Florida. Miss America 2013 Mallory Hytes Hagen was a host of the event.

== Results ==
=== Placements ===
Placements	Contestant(s)
Miss America's Outstanding Teen 2014	Florida - Leah Sykes
1st runner-up	Oklahoma - Ashten Vincent
2nd runner-up	Alabama - Jessica Procter
3rd runner-up	Missouri - Tess Mandoli
4th runner-up	Virginia - Cassie Donegan
Top 12	Colorado - Caitlin Quisenberry; New Jersey - Alyssa Sullivan; North Carolina - Emili McPhail; North Dakota - Abby Wolfe; Rhode Island - Heather Shen; Texas - Sheridan Donevant; Wisconsin - JamieNicole Morelan

=== Awards ===
==== Preliminary Awards ====
Awards	Contestant(s)
Evening Wear/On-Stage Question	Alabama - Jessica Procter; Rhode Island - Heather Shen; Oklahoma - Ashten Vincent
Lifestyle and Fitness	Kansas - Kristen Boxman; Alabama - Jessica Procter; Michigan - Julia Smith; Missouri - Tess Mandoli
Talent	Virginia - Cassie Donegan; Oklahoma - Ashten Vincent; Michigan - Julia Smith

==== Non-finalist Awards ====
Awards	Contestant(s)
Evening Wear/On-Stage Question	Pennsylvania - Katie Schreckengast
Interview	Oregon - Harley Emery; Pennsylvania - Katie Schreckengast
Talent	Michigan - Julia Smith

==== Teens in Action Awards ====
Awards	Contestant(s)
Winners	Oklahoma - Ashten Vincent; Maryland - Sabrina Frost
Finalist	Minnesota - Corrina Swiggum

==== Top Ad Sales Awards ====
Placement	Contestant(s)
1st Place	Texas - Sheridan Donevant
2nd Place	South Carolina - Brook Sill
3rd Place	Tennessee - Chandler Booth

==== Other Awards ====
Awards	Contestant(s)
America's Choice	Colorado - Caitlin Quisenberry; Texas - Sheridan Donevant
Community Service	Pennsylvania - Katie Schreckengast
Outstanding Achievement in Academic Life	North Carolina - Emili McPhail; South Carolina - Brook Sill
Outstanding Dance Talent	Michigan - Julia Smith
Outstanding Instrumental Talent	Illinois - Isabelle Hanson; North Carolina - Emili McPhail
Outstanding Vocal Talent	Virginia - Cassie Donegan
Photogenic	Puerto Rico - Daniela Ramirez
Scholastic Excellence	Rhode Island - Heather Shen
Spirit of America	Delaware - Tanee' De Costa

== Contestants ==
State	Name	Hometown	Age	Local Title	Talent	Placement at MAO Teen	Special Scholarships at MAO Teen	Notes
Alabama	Jessica Procter	Tuscaloosa	17	Miss West Central's Outstanding Teen	Broadway Vocal	2nd runner-up	Preliminary Evening Wear/OSQ Award Preliminary Lifestyle and Fitness Award	Later Miss Alabama 2017; Top 7 at Miss America 2018 pageant
Alaska	Autumn Harth	Eagle River	15	Miss Anchorage's Outstanding Teen	Vocal			
Arizona	MaddieRose Holler	Surprise	16	Miss Surprise's Outstanding Teen	Vocal			Later Miss Arizona 2017
Arkansas	Brighton Barnard	Little Rock	14	Miss Central Arkansas' Outstanding Teen	Contemporary Dance, "Firework" by Katy Perry			
California	Mikaela Harris	Clovis	16	Miss Clovis' Outstanding Teen	Piano			
Colorado	Caitlin Quisenberry					Top 15	America's Choice Award	
Connecticut	Tiana Dyson	New Haven	15	Miss Elm City's Outstanding Teen	Dance			
Delaware	Tanee' De Costa	Middletown	16	Miss Middletown's Outstanding Teen	Tahitian Dance		Spirit of America Award	
(Washington, D.C.) District of Columbia	Logan White	Washington D.C.						
Florida	Leah Sykes	Jacksonville	16	Miss River City's Outstanding Teen	Vocal, "Someone Like You" by Adele	Winner		
(Georgia (U.S. state)) Georgia	Kelly Hutchinson	Marietta	15	Miss Marietta's Outstanding Teen	Dance			
Hawaii	Hayley Cheyney Kane	Kaneohe	16		Hula, "Imagine" by Nohelani Cypriano			
Idaho	Abby Bitzenburg	Twin Falls	15	Miss Tri-Counties' Outstanding Teen				
Illinois	Isabelle Hanson	Glen Ellyn	17	Miss Northern Suburbs' Outstanding Teen	Violin		Outstanding Instrumental Talent Award	1st runner-up at Miss Illinois 2018 pageant Later Miss Illinois 2021
Indiana	Kylie Wheeler	Georgetown	15	Miss Harvest Homecoming's Outstanding Teen	Tap Dance			
Iowa	Emma Kate Wichmann	Bettendorf	16	Miss Scott County's Outstanding Teen				Featured twirler for Texas Christian University
Kansas	Kristen Boxman	Arkansas City	17	Miss Cowley County's Outstanding Teen	Tap Dance, "I Wanna Dance with Somebody" by Whitney Houston		Preliminary Lifestyle and Fitness Award	
Kentucky	Laura Hancock	Somerset	15	Miss Monticello's Outstanding Teen	Piano			
Louisiana	BayLea Huffman	Delhi	16	Miss Louisiana Port City's Outstanding Teen	Dance			
Maine	Daphne Ellis	Turner	16					
Maryland	Sabrina Frost	Frostburg	15	Miss Queen State's Outstanding Teen			Teens in Action Award	
Massachusetts	Kristina Ayanian	Burlington	15					
Michigan	Julia Smith	Sterling Heights	14	Miss Mid Michigan's Outstanding Teen	Dance		Non-finalist Talent Award Outstanding Dance Talent Award Preliminary Lifestyle and Fitness Award Preliminary Talent Award	
Minnesota	Corrina Swiggum	Prior Lake	15	Miss South Central's Outstanding Teen			Teens in Action Award Finalist	
Mississippi	Anne Elizabeth Buys	Vicksburg	14	Miss Riverland's Outstanding Teen	Ballet en Pointe			Later Miss Mississippi 2017
Missouri	Tess Mandoli	St. Louis	16	Miss Metro St. Louis' Outstanding Teen	Classical Piano, "Impromptus Opus 90, No. 2 in E-flat major" by Franz Schubert	3rd runner-up	Preliminary Lifestyle and Fitness Award	
Montana	Tessa Shelton		17					
Nebraska	Samantha Washington	Lincoln	15	Miss Omaha's Outstanding Teen	Vocal			First African-American crowned Miss Nebraska's Outstanding Teen Later Miss Nebraska Teen USA 2017 First woman in Nebraska to hold teen titles in both the Miss America and Miss USA organizations
Nevada	Katarina Clark	Reno		Miss Northern Counties' Outstanding Teen				
New Hampshire	Kenya Welch	Franklin	17	Miss Lakes Region's Outstanding Teen	Contemporary Dance, "Chasing Cars" by Snow Patrol			Competed on Season 12 of So You Think You Can Dance
New Jersey	Alyssa Sullivan	Cape May Court House	17	Miss South Shore Area's Outstanding Teen	Vocal, "Gimme, Gimme" from Thoroughly Modern Millie	Top 8		Later Miss New Jersey 2021
New Mexico	Jaden Smith	Roswell	14	Miss Chavez County's Outstanding Teen				
(New York (state)) New York	Krysta Prehoda			Miss Empire Rose's Outstanding Teen				
North Carolina	Emili McPhail	Roseboro	17	Miss Fayetteville's Outstanding Teen	Piano, "All of Me"	Top 8	Outstanding Achievement in Academic Life Award Outstanding Instrumental Talent Award	Later Miss Virginia 2018
North Dakota	Abby Wolfe			Miss Bismarck's Outstanding Teen		Top 15		
Ohio	Olivia Thoroughman	Portsmouth	17	Miss Portsmouth's Outstanding Teen				
Oklahoma	Ashten Vincent	Edmond		Miss Edmond Liberty Fest's Outstanding Teen		1st runner-up	Preliminary Evening Wear/OSQ Award Preliminary Talent Award Teens in Action Award	1st runner-up at Miss Oklahoma 2016 and 2019 pageants
Oregon	Harley Emery	Eugene	16	Miss Lane County's Outstanding Teen	Piano		Non-finalist Interview Award	Later Miss Oregon 2017
Pennsylvania	Katie Schreckengast	Palmyra	16	Miss Luzerne County's Outstanding Teen	Alto Saxophone		Community Service Award Non-finalist Evening Wear/OSQ Award Non-finalist Interview Award	Later Miss Pennsylvania 2017; Top 10 at Miss America 2018 pageant
Puerto Rico	Daniela Sofia Ramirez	San Germán	16	Miss San German's Outstanding Teen			Miss Photogenic	
Rhode Island	Heather Shen	East Greenwich	16	Miss Kent County's Outstanding Teen	Classical Violin	Top 15	Preliminary Evening Wear/OSQ Award Scholastic Excellence Award	Sister of Miss Rhode Island's Outstanding Teen 2011, Ivy Shen
South Carolina	Brook Sill	Duncan	16	Miss Mauldin Teen	Contemporary Jazz Dance, "Girl on Fire" by Alicia Keys		Outstanding Achievement in Academic Life Award	Cousin of Miss South Carolina Teen 2012, Sydney Sill
South Dakota	Nina Mesteth	Rapid City	16	Miss State Fair's Outstanding Teen				Younger sister of Miss South Dakota's Outstanding Teen 2006, Aja Kessler
Tennessee	Chandler Booth	Collierville		Miss Collierville's Outstanding Teen	Vocal, "I Will Always Love You"			Appeared on America's Got Talent with her high school a cappella group, OneVoice
Texas	Sheridan Donevant	Houston	16	Miss Houston's Outstanding Teen	Dance	Top 12	America's Choice Award	
Utah	Jessica Coombs	Draper	16	Miss Wasatch Front's Outstanding Teen	Piano			
Vermont	Chloe Johnson	Fairfield	17					
Virginia	Cassie Donegan	Hampton	15	Miss Greater Springfield's Outstanding Teen	Musical Theater Vocal, "The Girl in 14-G"	4th runner-up	Outstanding Vocal Talent Award Preliminary Talent Award	Originally 1st runner-up at Miss New York 2025, assuming the title after the winner resigned. Later Miss America 2026.
(Washington (state)) Washington	Haley Downey	Lake Stevens	16	Miss Puget Sound's Outstanding Teen	Harp			
West Virginia	Emily Lopez	Clarksburg	17	Miss Harrison County's Outstanding Teen	Lyrical Dance			Previously Miss Junior Teen United States 2010 Filed lawsuit against Miss West Virginia Organization for not providing a $5,000 in-kind scholarship
Wisconsin	JamieNicole Morelan	Racine	16	Miss Racine's Outstanding Teen	Vocal, "Don't Rain on My Parade"	Top 10	Top 5 Interview Award	Sister of Miss Wisconsin's Outstanding Teen 2009 and Miss America's Outstanding Teen 2010, Jeanette Morelan Relinquished title after the national pageant to compete in another pageant Later Distinguished Young Woman of Wisconsin 2015
Wyoming	Jordan Snyder	Buffalo	16	Miss Buffalo's Outstanding Teen				
