= Miss America's Outstanding Teen 2018 =

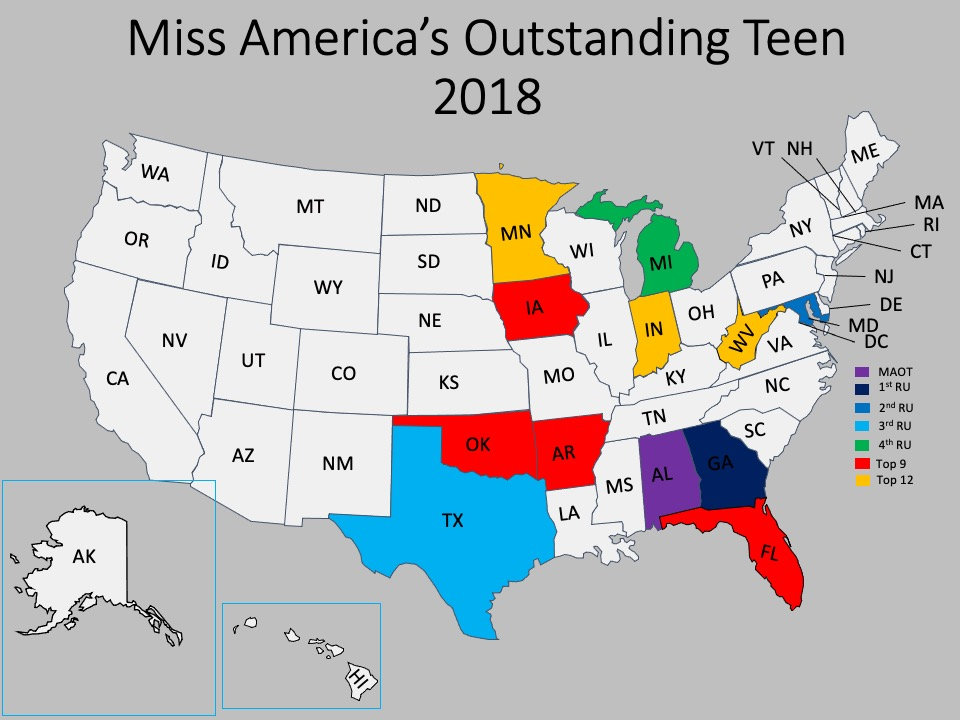
- Miss America's Outstanding Teen 2018 Participants and Results
- Date: July 29, 2017
- Venue: Orange County Convention Center, Orlando, Florida
- Entrants: 51
- Placements: 12
- Winner: Jessica Baeder; Alabama

Miss America's Outstanding Teen 2018 was the 12th Miss America's Outstanding Teen pageant held at the Linda Chapin Theatre in the Orange County Convention Center in Orlando, Florida on July 29, 2017, the same date as Miss Teen USA 2017. Nicole Jia of Oklahoma crowned her successor Jessica Baeder of Alabama at the end of the event. This was the first time that Miss Alabama's Outstanding Teen captured the title of Miss America's Outstanding Teen.

As of 2023, it is the first and only edition of Miss America's Outstanding Teen to have two contestants who would later go on to capture the title of Miss America; Emma Broyles of Alaska and Grace Stanke of Wisconsin, who won Miss America 2022 & 2023 respectively.

== Overview ==
=== Judges ===
The panel of judges on the final night of competition included TV anchor, veterinarian, and Miss America 1990, Debbye Turner Bell; beauty business executive, Sinead Norenius-Raniere, sociologist and professor, Hilary Levey Friedman; American tenor, Benjamin Brecher; pediatrician, Jamie Wells; and co-founder of Dance Network, Julie Stadler.

== Results ==
=== Placements ===
Placement	Contestant
Miss America's Outstanding Teen 2018	Alabama – Jessica Baeder
1st runner-up	Georgia – Annie Swan
2nd runner-up	Maryland – Chloe Wildman
3rd runner-up	Texas – Stephanie Wendt
4th runner-up	Michigan – Katie Preston
Top 9	Arkansas – Aubrey Elizabeth Reed; Florida – Reece Weaver; Iowa – Lydia Fisher; Oklahoma – Evelyn Smith
Top 12	Indiana – Ellie Barmes; Minnesota – Emily Rae Shumacher §; West Virginia – Sabrina Harrison

§ America's Choice

=== Top 12 ===
1. Oklahoma
2. Michigan
3. Florida
4. Arkansas
5. Alabama
6. Maryland
7. West Virginia
8. Georgia
9. Iowa
10. Indiana
11. Minnesota
12. Texas

=== Top 9 ===
1. Alabama
2. Michigan
3. Georgia
4. Texas
5. Florida
6. Arkansas
7. Iowa
8. Oklahoma
9. Maryland

=== Top 5 ===
1. Alabama
2. Georgia
3. Maryland
4. Michigan
5. Texas

=== Awards ===
==== Preliminary awards ====
Awards	Contestants
Preliminary Evening Wear and On Stage Question (OSQ)	(Georgia (U.S. state)) Georgia – Annie Swan (tie); Oklahoma – Evelyn Smith (tie); Oregon – Emma Ellis; Texas – Stephanie Wendt
Preliminary Talent	Alabama – Jessica Baeder; Michigan – Katie Preston; (New York (state)) New York – Asia Hickman

==== Talent awards ====
Awards	Contestant(s)
Dance	Alabama – Jessica Baeder; (Georgia (U.S. state)) Georgia – Annie Swan; Florida – Reece Weaver; West Virginia – Sabrina Harrison
Instrumental	Hawaii – Maia Mayeshiro; Kansas – Taylor Clark; (New York (state)) New York – Asia Hickman
Vocal	Michigan – Katie Preston

==== Other awards ====
Awards	Contestant(s)
Ad Sales Award	Pennsylvania – Madison Dompkosky
Children's Miracle Network (CMN) Miracle Maker	Massachusetts – Carly Fisher
Miss Congeniality/Spirit of America	(Washington (state)) Washington – Tia Moua
Non-finalist Evening Wear and On Stage Question	Oregon – Emma Ellis
Non-finalist Interview	Idaho – Ava Powell
Non-finalist Talent	Hawaii – Maia Mayeshiro; Kansas – Taylor Clark
Outstanding Achievement in Academic Life	Maryland – Chloe Wildman
Teen in Action	Alabama – Jessica Baeder
Scholastic Excellence	Texas – Stephanie Wendt
Random Acts of Kindness	West Virginia – Sabrina Harrison

== Contestants ==
- The Miss America's Outstanding Teen 2018 contestants are:

State	Name	Hometown	Age	Local Title	Talent	Placement	Special awards	Notes
Alabama	Jessica Baeder	Auburn	17	Miss Smith Station's Outstanding Teen	Ballet en pointe, "Boogie Woogie Bugle Boy"	Winner	Dance Talent Award Preliminary Talent Award Teens in Action Award	Daughter of Miss North Carolina 1984, Francesca Alder
Alaska	Emma Broyles	Anchorage	16	Miss Anchorage's Outstanding Teen	Vocal			Later Miss Alaska 2021 and Miss America 2022
Arizona	Dimon Elease Sanders	Glendale	17	Miss Glendale's Outstanding Teen	Dance			First African American to be crowned Miss Arizona's Outstanding Teen
Arkansas	Aubrey Elizabeth Reed	Russellville	17	Miss Lake Dardanelle's Outstanding Teen	Dance	Top 9		Daughter of Miss Arkansas 1995, Paula Montgomery Swindle
California	Violet Joy Hansen	El Dorado Hills	17	Miss Central California's Outstanding Teen	Vocal			
Colorado	Jordyn Penney	Johnstown	17		Dance			
Connecticut	Brooke Cyr	Waterbury	15	Miss Naugatuck Valley's Outstanding Teen	Lyrical Acrobatics			
Delaware	Nicole Hannah	Middletown	15	Miss Wilmington's Outstanding Teen	Baton Twirling			
(Washington, D.C.) District of Columbia	Brooke Miller	Washington D.C.	15		Vocal			
Florida	Reece Weaver	Jacksonville	15	Miss Jacksonville's Outstanding Teen	Acrobatic Jazz Dance, “Don’t Cry for Me Argentina” from Evita	Top 9	Dance Talent Award	
(Georgia (U.S. state)) Georgia	Annie Swan	Wadley	15	Miss International City's Outstanding Teen	Tap Dance, “Hit the Road, Jack”	1st runner-up	Dance Talent Award Preliminary Evening Wear and OSQ Award (tie)	
Hawaii	Maia Mayeshiro	Honolulu	16		Ukelele		Instrumental Talent Award Non-finalist Talent Award	
Idaho	Ava Powell	Emmett	16	Miss Treasure Valley's Outstanding Teen			Non-finalist Interview Award	
Illinois	Maddie Mazzella	Chicago	17	Miss Chicago's Outstanding Teen	Vocal			
Indiana	Ellie Barmes	Vincennes	17	Miss Metropolitan's Outstanding Teen	Vocal	Top 12		
Iowa	Lydia Fisher	Wapello	14	Miss Muscatine's Outstanding Teen	Tap Dance	Top 9		
Kansas	Taylor Clark	St. John	17	Miss Butler County's Outstanding Teen	Drum Solo,“Sing, Sing, Sing” and “In the Mood”		Instrumental Talent Award Non-finalist Talent Award	Later Miss Kansas 2021
Kentucky	Abigail Quammen	Frankfort	17	Miss Capital City's Outstanding Teen	Broadway Vocal, "Astonishing"			
Louisiana	Alana Lewis	Haughton	16	Miss Louisiana Watermelon Festival's Outstanding Teen	Vocal, "The Girl in 14G"			
Maine	Briley Bell	Lewiston	16		Vocal			
Maryland	Chloe Wildman	Lonaconing	16	Miss Frostburg's Outstanding Teen	Vocal	2nd runner-up	Outstanding Achievement in Academic Life Award	
Massachusetts	Carly Fisher	West Bridgewater	15	Miss Boston's Outstanding Teen	Speed Painting		CMN Miracle Maker Award	
Michigan	Katie Preston	Bridgman	17	Miss Sunset Coast's Outstanding Teen	Vocal, "Think of Me" from The Phantom of the Opera	4th runner-up	Preliminary Talent Award Vocal Talent Award	Performed "The Star-Spangled Banner" at Thursday night's preliminary competition during Miss America 2018 pageant
Minnesota	Emily Rae Schumacher	Mankato		Miss Mankato's Outstanding Teen		Top 12	America's Choice	Later named Miss Minnesota 2024
Mississippi	Holly Brand	Meridian	17	Miss Vicksburg's Outstanding Teen				Later Miss Mississippi 2021
Missouri	Heleena Haberer	Branson	16	Miss Springfield's Outstanding Teen	Contemporary Dance, “To This Day”			
Montana	Alexi Baisch	Glendive	17					
Nebraska	Carsyn Long	Gering	17	Miss Kearney's Outstanding Teen				
Nevada	Carli Gumm	Minden	16	Miss Carson County's Outstanding Teen				Younger sister of Miss Nevada's Outstanding Teen 2011 and Miss Nevada 2016, Bailey Gumm
New Hampshire	Kenzie Goode	Londonderry	16	Miss Seacoast's Outstanding Teen	Tap Dance			
New Jersey	Augostina Mallous	Cape May Court House	15	Miss Atlantic Shores' Outstanding Teen	Acrobatic Jazz Dance, "Hit Me With a Hot Note"			
New Mexico	Sienna Mascarenas	Albuquerque	16	Miss Rio Grande's Outstanding Teen				Later Miss New Mexico 2021
(New York (state)) New York	Asia Hickman	West Point	13	Miss Brooklyn's Outstanding Teen			Outstanding Instrumental Talent Award Preliminary Talent Award	Later Miss District of Columbia Teen USA 2022
North Carolina	Marissa Garrison	Mount Holly	15	Miss Queen City's Outstanding Teen	Contemporary Dance			Later a Season 15 rookie for the Dallas Cowboys Cheerleaders
North Dakota	Sydney Helgeson	Bismarck	16	Miss Bismarck's Outstanding Teen				
Ohio	Gracie Fusco	Kirtland	16	Miss Great Lake's Outstanding Teen				
Oklahoma	Evelyn Smith	Oklahoma City	16	Miss Oklahoma City's Outstanding Teen		Top 9	Preliminary Evening Wear and OSQ Award (tie)	Sister of Miss Oklahoma Teen USA 2016, Hellen Smith
Oregon	Emma Ellis	Portland	17	Miss Cascade's Outstanding Teen			Non-Finalist Evening Wear/OSQ Award Preliminary Evening Wear/OSQ Award	
Pennsylvania	Madison Dompkosky	Mountain Top	15	Miss Wilkes-Barre/Scranton's Outstanding Teen	Tap Dance, "Don't Stop Till You Get Enough"		Ad Sales Award	
Rhode Island	Caroline Hollingsworth	East Greenwich	15		Piano, 3rd Movement from "Moonlight Sonata" by Beethoven			
South Carolina	Ally McCaslin	Simpsonville	16	Miss Woodmont High School Teen	Vocal			
South Dakota	Elizabeth Nesland	Rapid City	17	Miss Sioux Empire's Outstanding Teen				
Tennessee	Autumn Arsenault	Knoxville	16	Miss Greater Greenville's Outstanding Teen	Violin, "The Phantom of the Opera" arranged by Lindsey Stirling			
Texas	Stephanie Wendt	Coppell	17	Miss North Texas' Outstanding Teen	Dance, "I Believe" by Fantasia Barrino	3rd runner-up	Preliminary Evening Wear/OSQ Award Scholastic Excellence Award	Later assumed Miss Texas 2026
Utah	Addelyn Brotherson	Mount Pleasant	14	Miss Sanpete County's Outstanding Teen	Lyrical Dance, “Keep Me"			
Vermont	Jenna Lawrence	St. Albans	16					
Virginia	Isabella Jessee	Roanoke	17	Miss Southwestern Virginia's Outstanding Teen	Violin, "The Devil Went Down to Georgia”			Previously Miss Teen Virginia International 2015; 4th runner-up at Miss Teen International 2016
(Washington (state)) Washington	Tia Moua	Spokane	15	Miss Spokane's Outstanding Teen	Jazz Dance		Miss Congeniality/Spirit of America Award	
West Virginia	Sabrina Harrison	Martinsburg		Miss Berkeley County's Outstanding Teen	Dance	Top 12	Outstanding Dance Talent Award Random Acts of Kindness Award	
Wisconsin	Grace Marie Stanke	Wausau	16	Miss Harbor Cities' Outstanding Teen	Violin, "Winter" by Vivaldi			Later Miss Wisconsin 2022 and Miss America 2023
Wyoming	Amelia Beck Winter	Wheatland						
