= Miss America's Outstanding Teen 2015 =

Beauty pageant edition

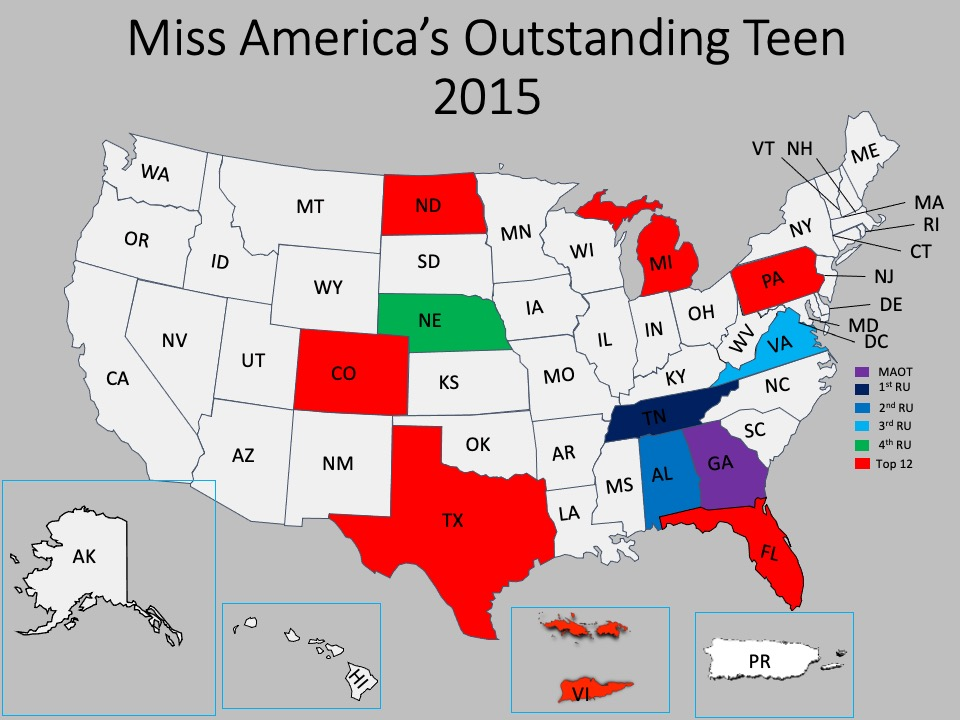
- Miss America's Outstanding Teen 2015 Participants and Results
- Date: August 17, 2014
- Presenters: Nina Davuluri
- Venue: Linda Chapin Theater
- Entrants: 52
- Placements: 12
- Winner: Olivia McMillan; Georgia

Miss America's Outstanding Teen 2015 was the 9th Miss America's Outstanding Teen pageant held at the Linda Chapin Theater in the Orange County Convention Center in Orlando, Florida on August 2, 2014. At the conclusion of the event, Leah Sykes of Florida crowned her successor Olivia McMillan of Georgia. Miss America 2014 Nina Davuluri was a host of the event.

== Results ==
=== Placements ===
Placement	Contestant
Miss America's Outstanding Teen 2015	Georgia – Olivia McMillan
1st runner-up	Tennessee – Lexie Perry
2nd runner-up	Alabama – Morgan Green
3rd runner-up	Virginia – Casey Shepard
4th runner-up	Nebraska – Morgan Holen
Top 12	Colorado – Abigail Schwartz; Florida – Michaela McLean; Michigan – Alisha Gatchel; North Dakota – Raghen Lucy §; Pennsylvania – Page Mackenzie Weinstein; Texas – Kassidy Brown; Virgin Islands – Cereyna Jade Bougouneau §

§ – America's Choice

=== Awards ===
==== Preliminary awards ====
Award	Contestant
Evening Wear/On-Stage Question	Alabama – Morgan Green; Oklahoma – Joei Whisenant; Washington – Tayler Plunkett
Talent	Georgia – Olivia McMillan; North Dakota – Raghen Lucy; Tennessee – Lexie Perry

==== Non-finalist awards ====
Award	Contestant
Evening Wear/On-Stage Question	Oklahoma – Joei Whisenant; Washington – Tayler Plunkett
Interview	Arkansas – Ashton Yarbrough; New Jersey – Samantha Rizzuto
Talent	Utah – JessiKate Riley; Wisconsin – Elise O'Connell

==== Talent awards ====
Award	Contestant
Outstanding Dancer	Florida – Michaela McLean; Nebraska – Morgan Holen
Outstanding Instrumentalist	North Dakota – Raghen Lucy; Tennessee – Lexie Perry
Outstanding Vocalist	Georgia – Olivia McMillan

==== Children's Miracle Network Hospitals Miracle Maker awards ====
Award	Contestant
CMN Hospitals Miracle Maker	Pennsylvania – Page Mackenzie Weinstein

==== Teens in Action awards ====
Award	Contestants
Teens in Action Winners	Nevada – Amy Smith; New Jersey – Samantha Rizzuto

==== Top Ad Sales awards ====
Award	Contestant
1st Place	South Carolina – Hope Harvard
2nd Place	North Dakota – Raghen Lucy; Texas – Kassidy Brown
3rd Place	Pennsylvania – Page Mackenzie Weinstein

==== Other awards ====
Award	Contestant
America's Choice	North Dakota – Raghen Lucy; Virgin Islands – Cereyna Jade Bougouneau
Outstanding Achievement in Academic Life	New Jersey – Samantha Rizzuto
Photogenic	Vermont – Alexina Federhen
Random Acts of Kindness	Delaware – Grace Otley
Scholastic Excellence	North Carolina – Karson Fair
Spirit of America	Nevada – Amy Smith

== Contestants ==
State	Name	Hometown	Age	Local Title	Talent	Placement at MAO Teen	Special Scholarships at MAO Teen	Notes
Alabama	Morgan Green	Tuscaloosa	17	Miss Tuscaloosa's Outstanding Teen	Vocal, "Don't Rain on My Parade" from Funny Girl	2nd runner-up	Preliminary Evening Wear/OSQ Award	
Alaska	Alyssa Hampton	Anchorage	16		Flute, "Take Five" by Paul Desmond			First African-American to be crowned Miss Alaska's Outstanding Teen
Arizona	Amber Barto	Ahwatukee	16	Miss City of Maricopa's Outstanding Teen	Jazz Dance			Later Miss Arizona 2021
Arkansas	Ashton Yarbrough	Bentonville	17	Miss Dogwood's Outstanding Teen	Vocal		Non-finalist Interview Award	
California	Kyla Reed	Tehachapi	17	Miss Orange County's Outstanding Teen	Piano, "Waterfall" by Jon Schmidt (The Piano Guys)			
Colorado	Abigail Schwartz	Denver	16		Piano, "Celtic Joy" by Calvin Jones and the Lviv Virtuosos	Top 12		
Connecticut	Cynthia Dias	Wolcott	14	Miss Wolcott's Outstanding Teen	Lyrical Dance			Later Miss Connecticut USA 2022
Delaware	Grace Otley	Hockessin	14	Miss Greenville's Outstanding Teen	Vocal		Random Acts of Kindness Award	
(Washington, D.C.) District of Columbia	Cydney Hill	Washington D.C.						
Florida	Michaela McLean	Clermont	17	Miss Winter Garden's Outstanding Teen	Dance	Top 12	Outstanding Dancer Award	Later Miss Florida 2019
(Georgia (U.S. state)) Georgia	Olivia McMillan	Centerville	17	Miss Warner Robins' Outstanding Teen	Classical Vocal, "Nessun dorma" from Puccini's opera, Turandot	Winner	Outstanding Vocalist Award Preliminary Talent Award	
Hawaii	Tarah Driver	St. Louis Heights	15	Miss East Oahu's Outstanding Teen				
Idaho	Heidi Olsen			Miss Gate City's Outstanding Teen				
Illinois	Grace Etzkorn	Lisle	17	Miss Windy City's Outstanding Teen	Vocal			Competed at the Jimmy Awards in 2015 2nd runner-up at Miss Illinois 2018
Indiana	Maddison Bryant	LaOtto	16	Miss Three Rivers Festival's Outstanding Teen	Clogging			
Iowa	Anna Masengarb	Muscatine	17	Miss Scott County's Outstanding Teen				
Kansas	Megha Gangadhar	Wichita	17	Miss Asian Festival's Outstanding Teen	Bollywood Fusion Dance, "Jai Ho" by The Pussycat Dolls			
Kentucky	Alex Francke	Lexington	17	Miss Ohio Valley's Outstanding Teen	Vocal			4th runner-up at National Sweetheart 2018 pageant Later Miss Kentucky 2019
Louisiana	Meagan Crews	Bossier City	17	Miss Dixie Gem Peach's Outstanding Teen	Vocal			Miss Louisiana Watermelon Festival 2019
Maine	Madeline Jarvis							
Maryland	Sarah Robinson	Ijamsville	15	Miss Northern Maryland's Outstanding Teen				3rd runner-up at Miss Maryland 2017 3rd runner-up at Miss Virginia 2018
Massachusetts	Courtney Adelman	Middleborough	17	Miss Bristol County's Outstanding Teen				Has a younger brother with Down Syndrome
Michigan	Alisha Gatchel	Greenville	16	Miss Spirit of the State's Outstanding Teen	Piano/Vocal	Top 12		
Minnesota	Lauren Algyer			Miss Southern Valley's Outstanding Teen				
Mississippi	Grace Munro	Ocean Springs	17	Miss Turtle Creek's Outstanding Teen	Jazz Dance			
Missouri	Charlee Bisch	St. Louis	16	Miss Metro St. Louis' Outstanding Teen	Vocal, "Not for the Life of Me" from Thoroughly Modern Millie			
Montana	Haylee Storlie	Glendive	17					
Nebraska	Morgan Holen	Omaha			Dance	4th runner-up	Outstanding Dancer Award	Daughter of Miss Nebraska 1988, Jodi Miller Holen Later Distinguished Young Woman of Nebraska 2016 Top 10 at Distinguished Young Woman 2016 Later Miss Nebraska 2021
Nevada	Amy Smith	Henderson		Miss Northeast Nevada's Outstanding Teen			Teens in Action Award Spirit of America Award	Younger sister of Ellie Smith, Miss Nevada's Outstanding Teen 2012 and Miss Nevada 2014
New Hampshire	Caroline Carter	Dover	16	Miss Greater Derry's Outstanding Teen	Vocal			Later Miss New Hampshire 2016
New Jersey	Samantha Rizzuto	Long Valley	17		Vocal		Non-finalist Interview Award Outstanding Achievement in Academic Life Award Teens in Action Award	
New Mexico	Lindsey Day	Carlsbad	14	Miss Enchanted Forest's Outstanding Teen				
(New York (state)) New York	Cady Ruth Stoever			Miss Flower City's Outstanding Teen				
North Carolina	Karson Fair	Benson		Miss Greater Cape Fear's Outstanding Teen			Scholastic Excellence Award	3rd runner-up at Miss Alabama 2017 2nd runner-up at Miss Alabama 2018
North Dakota	Raghen Lucy			Miss Williston's Outstanding Teen		Top 12	America's Choice Outstanding Instrumentalist Award Preliminary Talent Award 2nd Place in Ad Sales	
Ohio	Rosie Westerbeck	New Bremen	15	Miss Apple Blossom's Outstanding Teen	Clogging			
Oklahoma	Joei Whisenant	Ada	16	Miss Edmond Liberty Fest's Outstanding Teen			Non-finalist Evening Wear/OSQ Award Preliminary Evening Wear/OSQ Award	
Oregon	Nicole Carter	Klamath Falls	17	Miss Klamath County's Outstanding Teen	Vocal			
Pennsylvania	Page Mackenzie Weinstein	Pittsburgh	16	Miss Laurel Highlands' Outstanding Teen	Dance/Twirl Routine, "Wings" by Little Mix	Top 10	CMN Miracle Maker Award 3rd Place in Ad Sales	Later Miss Pennsylvania 2024
Puerto Rico	Victoria Violeta			Miss Dorado's Outstanding Teen				
Rhode Island	Grace Romanello	South Kingstown	15	Miss Southern Rhode Island's Outstanding Teen	Vocal, "Hit Me with a Hot Note" by Duke Ellington			
South Carolina	Hope Harvard	Easley	16	Miss Greater Easley Teen	Dance en Pointe, "Supercalifragilisticexpialidocious" from Mary Poppins		1st Place in Ad Sales	
South Dakota	Taylor Bird	Arlington	17	Miss Jack's Outstanding Teen				
Tennessee	Lexie Perry	Dresden	17	Miss Jackson's Outstanding Teen	Fiddle, "Devil Went Down to Georgia/Orange Blossom Special"	1st runner-up	Outstanding Instrumentalist Award Preliminary Talent Award	
Texas	Kassidy Brown	Lufkin	17	Miss Dallas' Outstanding Teen	Contemporary Jazz en Pointe, "It's Oh So Quiet" by Björk	Top 7	2nd Place in Ad Sales	
Utah	JessiKate Riley	Beaver	16	Miss Northern Utah's Outstanding Teen	Violin		Non-finalist Talent Award	Later Miss Utah 2017 and Miss Utah USA 2021
Vermont	Alexina Federhen	Bennington	17		Vocal		Miss Photogenic	Previously Miss Vermont High School America 2013 Later 1st runner-up at Miss Vermont Teen USA 2016 Later Miss Vermont 2022
Virginia	Casey Shepard	Virginia Beach	15	Miss Apple Blossom's Outstanding Teen	Ballet en Pointe	3rd runner-up		
(United States Virgin Islands) Virgin Islands	Cereyna Jade Bougouneau	Saint Croix				Top 10	America's Choice	
(Washington (state)) Washington	Tayler Plunkett	Kennewick	16	Miss Sun Valley's Outstanding Teen	Classical Vocal		Non-finalist Evening Wear/OSQ Award Preliminary Evening Wear/OSQ Award	
West Virginia	June Braunlich	Wheeling	17	Miss Southern West Virginia's Outstanding Teen	Piano			2nd runner-up at Miss West Virginia 2016 Miss Marshall County 2018 2nd runner-up at Miss West Virginia 2018
Wisconsin	Elise O'Connell	Trevor	17	Miss Fox River Valley's Outstanding Teen	Musical Theater Vocal, "On My Way" from Violet		Non-finalist Talent Award	Miss South Central 2018 2nd runner-up at Miss Wisconsin 2018
Wyoming	Addison Paige Treesh	Gillette	14		Dance			3rd runner-up at Miss Wyoming Teen USA 2017 1st runner-up at Miss Wyoming Teen USA 2018 Later Miss Wyoming USA 2019
