= Miss America's Outstanding Teen 2019 =

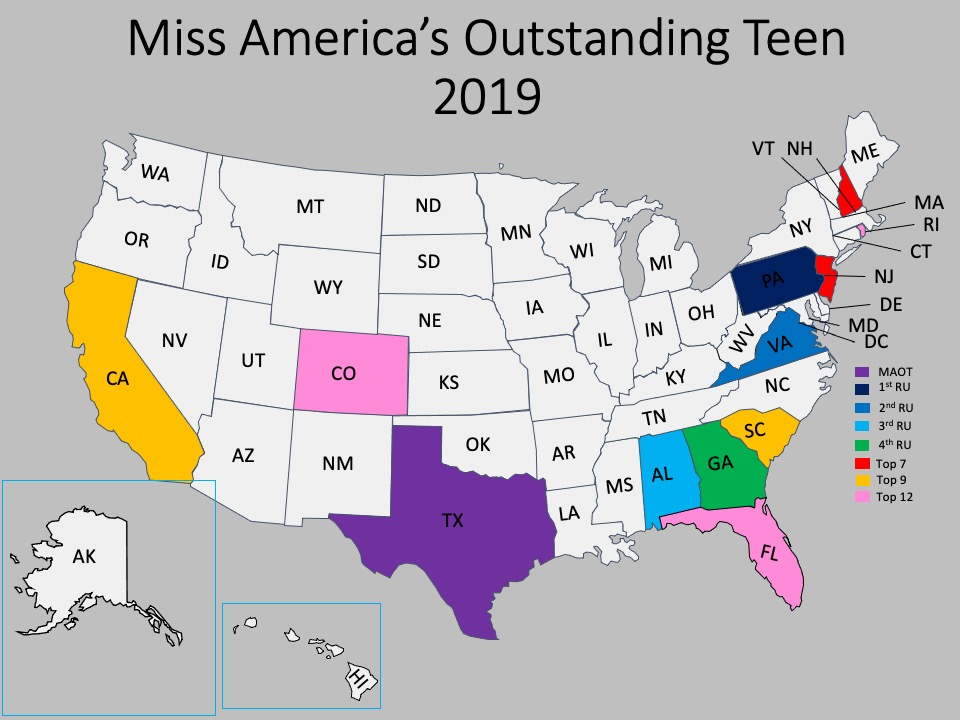
- Miss America's Outstanding Teen 2019 Participants and Results
- Date: July 28, 2018
- Presenters: Mike Rome (Preliminary); Cara Mund (Finals)
- Venue: Linda Chapin Theater, Orlando, Florida, United States
- Entrants: 51
- Placements: 12
- Winner: London Hibbs; Texas

Miss America's Outstanding Teen 2019 was the 13th Miss America's Outstanding Teen pageant, held at the Linda Chapin Theater in the Orange County Convention Center in Orlando, Florida, on July 28, 2018.

Jessica Baeder of Alabama crowned her successor London Hibbs of Texas at the end of the event.

== Judges ==
The panel of judges for the 2019 competition included:

- Lacey Russ Randall, Miss America's Outstanding Teen 2011
- Ivan Pulinkala, Dean of the College of the Arts at Kennesaw State University
- Patrick Bowen, Director of World Jazz Studies at the Las Vegas Academy of the Arts
- Emily Luther, singer and Miss Rhode Island's Outstanding Teen 2009
- Shaunna Payne Gold, Associate Director of Student Development at the University of Maryland
- Brian Dameris, Chief of Staff at the Charity Network

== Results ==
=== Placements ===
Placement	Contestant
Miss America's Outstanding Teen 2019	Texas – London Hibbs
1st runner-up	Pennsylvania – Cecilia Petrush
2nd runner-up	Virginia – Emily Kinsey
3rd runner-up	Alabama – Collins McMurray
4th runner-up	Georgia – Rory Pan
Top 7	New Hampshire – Morgane Vigroux; New Jersey – Alaina Murphy
Top 9	California – Cameron Doan; South Carolina – Berkley Bryant
Top 12	Colorado – Sara Al-Bazali; Florida – Jessica Sales; Rhode Island – Macie Johnson §

§ – America's Choice

=== Top 12 ===
1. New Jersey
2. Georgia
3. New Hampshire
4. South Carolina
5. Colorado
6. California
7. Texas
8. Virginia
9. Pennsylvania
10. Florida
11. Alabama
12. Rhode Island

=== Top 9 ===
1. New Hampshire
2. Virginia
3. Alabama
4. New Jersey
5. Georgia
6. Texas
7. South Carolina
8. Pennsylvania
9. California

=== Top 7 ===
1. Pennsylvania
2. Georgia
3. Virginia
4. Texas
5. New Jersey
6. Alabama
7. New Hampshire

=== Awards ===
==== Preliminary awards ====
Award	Contestants
Preliminary Evening Wear/On-Stage Question (OSQ)	California – Cameron Doan; (Georgia (U.S. state)) Georgia – Rory Pan (tie); Rhode Island – Macie Johnson (tie); Texas – London Hibbs
Preliminary Talent	New Hampshire – Morgane Vigroux; Pennsylvania – Cecilia Petrush; Texas – London Hibbs

==== Talent awards ====
Awards	Contestant(s)
Overall Dance	Florida – Jessica Sales; (Georgia (U.S. state)) Georgia – Rory Pan; Iowa – Cali Wilson; (New York (state)) New York – Cayla Kumar
Overall Instrumental	Alaska – Jazzie Trotter; Missouri – Ashley Whipple
Overall Vocal	New Hampshire – Morgane Vigroux; Pennsylvania – Cecilia Petrush

==== Other awards ====
Awards	Contestant(s)
America's Choice	Rhode Island – Macie Johnson
Children's Miracle Network (CMN) Miracle Maker Award	South Carolina – Berkley Bryant
Miss Congeniality/Spirit of America	Hawaii – Sophia Stark
Non-finalist Evening Wear and On-Stage Question (OSQ)	Illinois – Peyton Newman; (New York (state)) New York – Cayla Kumar
Non-finalist Interview	Nevada – Tia Henderson
Non-finalist Talent	Iowa – Cali Wilson; (New York (state)) New York – Cayla Kumar
Outstanding Achievement in Academic Life	Arkansas – Camille Cathey
Random Acts of Kindness	North Dakota – Micah Schlittenhardt
Scholastic Excellence	Alabama – Collins McMurray
Teens in Action Award Winner	Missouri – Ashley Whipple
Teens in Action Award Finalists	Arizona – Ashlyn Thompson; Mississippi – Presley Caldwell; (New York (state)) New York – Cayla Kumar; Tennessee – Mary Humphrey
Top Advertisement Sales Media Scholarship	Pennsylvania – Cecilia Petrush

== Contestants ==
The Miss America's Outstanding Teen 2019 contestants are:

- Declared as Winner
- Ended as a runner-up
- Ended as a finalist or semi-finalist

State	Name	Hometown	Age	Local Title	Talent	Placement at MAO Teen	Special scholarships at MAO Teen	Notes
Alabama	Collins McMurray	Vestavia Hills	16	Miss Friendliest City's Outstanding Teen	Vocal, "Over the Rainbow"	3rd runner-up	Scholastic Excellence Award	
Alaska	Jazzie Trotter	Eagle River	14	Miss Chugiak/Eagle River's Outstanding Teen	Piano, "Maple Leaf Rag" by Scott Joplin		Overall Instrumental Talent Award	
Arizona	Ashlyn Thompson	Mesa	17	Miss North Phoenix's Outstanding Teen	Clogging, "I Wanna Dance with Somebody"		Teens in Action Award Finalist	
Arkansas	Camille Cathey	Wynne	16	Miss Northeast Arkansas' Outstanding Teen	Vocal, "Dream On"		Outstanding Achievement in Academic Life	
California	Cameron Doan	Santa Ana	16	Miss Anaheim's Outstanding Teen	Baton Twirling, "Come Alive"	Top 9	Preliminary Evening Wear/OSQ Award	Later Miss California Teen USA 2021
Colorado	Sara Al-Bazali	Denver	16		Vocal, "How to Return Home"	Top 12		
Connecticut	Morgan Mancini	Wolcott	16	Miss Farmingbury's Outstanding Teen	Tap Dance, "Happy"			
Delaware	Sky Knox	Newark	16	Miss Newark's Outstanding Teen	Lyrical Gymnastic Routine, "Titanium"			
(Washington, D.C.) District of Columbia	Natalie Beckford	Washington, D.C.	15		Ballet en Pointe			
Florida	Jessica Sales	Orlando	17	Miss Orlando's Outstanding Teen	Contemporary Clogging, "Boogie Shoes"	Top 12	Overall Dance Talent Award	
(Georgia (U.S. state)) Georgia	Rory Pan	Johns Creek	16	Miss Heart of Atlanta's Outstanding Teen	Ballet en Pointe, "Fire on Ice"	4th runner-up	Overall Dance Talent Award Preliminary Evening Wear/OSQ Award (tie)	
Hawaii	Sophia Stark	Honolulu	13		Operatic Vocal, "Juliet's Waltz"		Spirit of America Award	Appeared on MasterChef Junior
Idaho	Chloe Shelton	Boise	17	Miss Star Garnet's Outstanding Teen	Jazz Dance			
Illinois	Peyton Newman	Vernon Hills	16	Miss Chicago's Outstanding Teen	Vocal, "Vienna"		Non-finalist Evening Wear/OSQ Award	Previously National American Miss Junior Pre Teen 2012
Indiana	Jenna Zabona	Kendallville	15	Miss Metropolitan's Outstanding Teen	Jazz Dance, "The Way You Make Me Feel"			
Iowa	Cali Wilson	Norwalk	17	Miss Central Iowa's Outstanding Teen	Dance, "Turn Your Face" by Little Mix		Non-finalist Talent Award Overall Dance Talent Award	
Kansas	Amelia Benjamin	Leawood	16		Vocal, "God Bless America"			
Kentucky	Joanna Clark	Lexington	17	Miss Wayne County Area's Outstanding Teen	Piano, "Ode to Joy" by Beethoven			
Louisiana	Gracie Reichman	Colfax	16	Miss Louisiana Watermelon Festival's Outstanding Teen	Contemporary Clogging, "Let's Get Loud"			
Maine	Macy Grant	Brunswick	16		Contemporary Dance			
Maryland	Katie Allen	Easton	16	Miss Baltimore's Outstanding Teen	Ballet en Pointe, "Spanish Rose"			
Massachusetts	Jordan St. Onge	Acushnet	17	Miss Boston's Outstanding Teen	Irish Step Dance, "Roundtable Rival" by Lindsey Stirling			
Michigan	Maria Evola	Macomb	15	Miss Saginaw County's Outstanding Teen	Dance, "Maria" from West Side Story			
Minnesota	Eden Webb	Minnetonka	16	Miss St. Croix Valley's Outstanding Teen	Lyrical Dance, "Lost"			
Mississippi	Presley Caldwell	Grenada	17	Miss Northland's Outstanding Teen	Vocal, "Desperado" by The Eagles		Teens in Action Award Finalist	
Missouri	Ashley Whipple	Chesterfield	17	Miss Heartland's Outstanding Teen	Piano, "Solfeggietto" by Carl Philipp Emanuel Bach		Overall Instrumental Talent Award Teens in Action Winner	
Montana	Cammy Heck	Sidney	17		Tap Dance			
Nebraska	Kelsie Therkildsen	Bennington	15	Miss Metro's Outstanding Teen	Jazz Dance, "Swing With Me"			
Nevada	Tia Henderson	Reno	17	Miss Virginia City's Outstanding Teen	Jazz Dance, "No Excuses"		Non-finalist Interview Award	
New Hampshire	Morgane Vigroux	Derry	16	Miss Capital Area's Outstanding Teen	Vocal, "California Dreamin'"	Top 7	Overall Vocal Talent Award Preliminary Talent Award	
New Jersey	Alaina Murphy	Carneys Point	15	Miss Atlantic Shores' Outstanding Teen	Vocal, "Finding Neverland"	Top 7		
New Mexico	Abrianna Morales	Las Cruces	16	Miss Las Cruces' Outstanding Teen	Vocal, "All That Matters"			
(New York (state)) New York	Cayla Kumar	Queens Village	15	Miss Bronx's Outstanding Teen	Bollywood Fusion Dance, “Mera Mahi Bada Sohna” from Dhaai Akshar Prem Ke		Non-finalist Evening Wear/OSQ Award Non-finalist Talent Award Overall Dance Talent Award Teens in Action Award Finalist	
North Carolina	Caroline Credle	Clayton	17	Miss Clayton's Outstanding Teen	Ballet en Pointe, La Esmeralda			
North Dakota	Micah Schlittenhardt	Bismarck	16	Miss Northern Lights' Outstanding Teen	Ballet en Pointe, Don Quixote		Random Acts of Kindness Award	
Ohio	Julianna Heichel	Lexington	15	Miss Northern Ohio's Outstanding Teen	Vocal, "Feeling Good"			Younger sister of Miss Ohio's Outstanding Teen 2016, Madison Heichel
Oklahoma	Sydney Massey	Tulsa	15	Miss Oklahoma City's Outstanding Teen	Musical Theatre Dance, ”So Much Better” from Legally Blonde			
Oregon	Kennedy Hjelte	Tualatin	16	Miss Three Rivers' Outstanding Teen	Vocal, "On My Own" from Les Misérables			
Pennsylvania	Cecilia Petrush	Murrysville	17	Miss Laurel Highlands' Outstanding Teen	Vocal, "Don't Rain on My Parade" from Funny Girl	1st runner-up	Overall Vocal Talent Award Preliminary Talent Award Top Advertisement Sales Media Scholarship	
Rhode Island	Macie Johnson	Wickford	16		Jazz Dance, "Wonder"	Top 12	America's Choice Preliminary Evening Wear/OSQ Award (tie)	
South Carolina	Berkley Bryant	Anderson	17	Miss River City Teen	Tap Dance, "Runaway Baby" by Bruno Mars	Top 9	CMN Miracle Maker Award	Later Miss Volunteer America 2025
South Dakota	Jessica Benson	Rapid City	17	Miss Hot Springs' Outstanding Teen	Vocal, "100 Easy Ways to Lose a Man" from Wonderful Town			
Tennessee	Mary Humphrey	Jackson	16	Miss Jackson's Outstanding Teen	Dance en Pointe, "Ease on Down the Road" from The Wiz		Teens in Action Award Finalist	
Texas	London Hibbs	Tyler	17	Miss Dallas' Outstanding Teen	Vocal, "Think of Me" from The Phantom of the Opera	Winner	Preliminary Evening Wear/OSQ Award Preliminary Talent Award	
Utah	Axuray Talbot	Spanish Fork	16	Miss Spanish Fork's Outstanding Teen	Dance, "This Is Me"			
Vermont	Shannon Adams	Warren	16		Celtic Harp, "The Mad River Set"			
Virginia	Emily Kinsey	Richmond	16	Miss Apple Blossom Festival's Outstanding Teen	Pointe Dance, "Friend Like Me"	2nd runner-up		
(Washington (state)) Washington	Novalee Lewis	Tacoma	14	Miss Emerald City's Outstanding Teen	Tap Dance			Previously Miss Junior High School America 2016; Later Miss Rhode Island High School 2020; Later Miss Washington Teen USA 2020
West Virginia	Katelin Bocchetti	Shepherdstown	17	Miss Jefferson County's Outstanding Teen	Flute, "Dueling Banjos"			
Wisconsin	Mandi Jo Genord	Montello	16	Miss Northern Lights' Outstanding Teen	Lyrical Dance, Glee version of "I Dreamed a Dream" from Les Misérables			Later named Miss Wisconsin 2024
Wyoming	Taylor Greig	Sheridan	17		Contemporary Dance			
