= Miss America's Outstanding Teen 2006 =

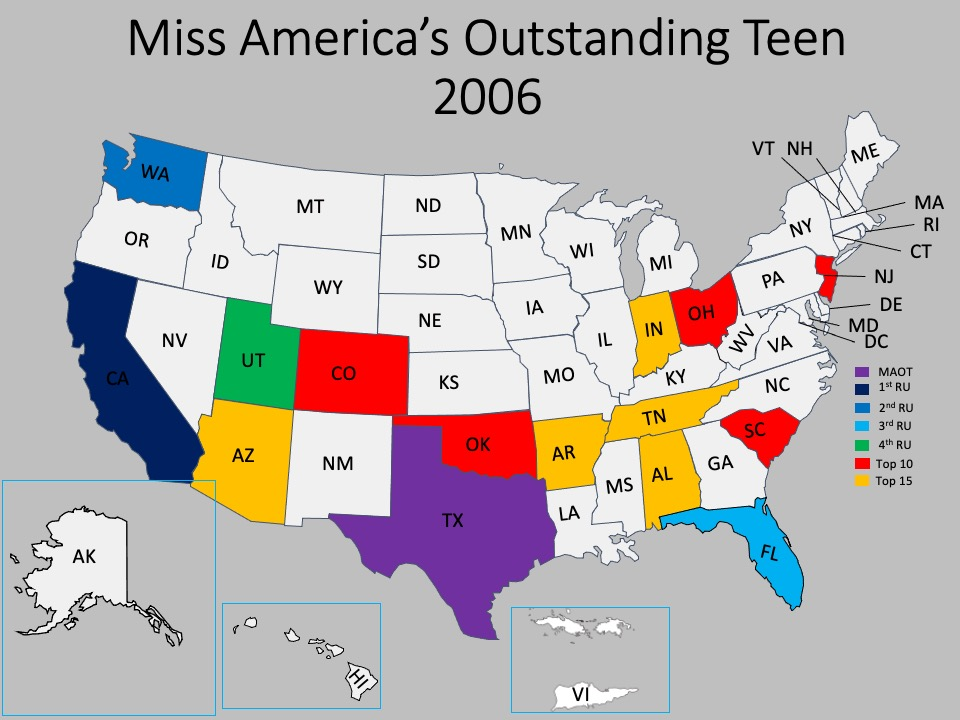
- Miss America's Outstanding Teen 2006 Participants and Results
- Date: August 20, 2005
- Presenters: Joey Fatone; Deidre Downs
- Venue: Linda Chapin Theater, Orange County Convention Center, Orlando, Florida, United States
- Entrants: 52
- Placements: 15
- Winner: Meghan Miller; Texas

Miss America's Outstanding Teen 2006 was the first Miss America's Outstanding Teen pageant, held at the Linda Chapin Theater in the Orange County Convention Center in Orlando, Florida on August 20, 2005.

At the conclusion of the event, Meghan Miller of Texas was crowned Miss America's Outstanding Teen 2006 by Miss America 2005 Deidre Downs.

== Results ==
=== Placements ===
Placement	Contestant
Miss America's Outstanding Teen 2006	Texas – Meghan Miller
1st Runner-Up	California – Arianna Afsar
2nd Runner-Up	Washington – Shalane Larango
3rd Runner-Up	Florida – Sierra Minott
4th Runner-Up	Utah – Jennifer Gulbrandsen
Top 10	Alabama – Jenna Bryant; Arizona – Adrienne Nurss; Arkansas – Hannah Joiner; Indiana – Sarah Gorecki; Tennessee – Madeline Littrell
Top 15	Colorado – Jocelyn Story; New Jersey – Katie Berry; Ohio – Ali Nance; Oklahoma – Becca Hester; South Carolina – Lindley Mayer

=== Other awards ===
Award	Contestant
Scholastic Excellence	Alaska – Kimberly Carr
Preliminary Evening Wear/OSQ	Arkansas – Hannah Joiner; Florida – Sierra Minott; Texas – Meghan Miller
Preliminary Lifestyle and Fitness	Arkansas – Hannah Joiner
Preliminary Talent	California – Arianna Afsar; Texas – Meghan Miller; Utah – Jennifer Gulbrandsen
Spirit of America	Oklahoma – Becca Hester
Overall Talent	Texas – Meghan Miller
Outstanding Academic Achievement	West Virginia – Veronika Ohlinger

== Pageant ==
=== Selection of contestants ===
One delegate from each state, District of Columbia, and the Virgin Islands were chosen in state pageants held from September 2004 to June 2005.

=== Preliminaries ===
During the 3 days prior to the final night, the delegates compete in the preliminary competition, which involves private interviews with the judges and a show where they compete in talent, evening wear, casual wear, lifestyle and fitness in active wear, and on-stage question. They were held from August 17-19, 2005.

=== Finals ===
During the final competition, the top 15 compete in casual wear and evening wear, the top 10 compete in talent, and the top 5 compete in on-stage question.

== Contestants ==
52 delegates participated:

State	Name	Hometown	Age	Local Title	Talent	Placement	Awards	Notes
Alabama	Jenna Bryant	Hoover	17		Jazz Dance	Top 10		
Alaska	Kimberly Carr	Wasilla	17	At-Large	Vocal		Scholastic Excellence Award	Previously Alaska's National Junior Teen-Ager 2004
Arizona	Adrienne Nurss	Sierra Vista	17	At-Large	Lyrical Dance	Top 10		Younger sister of Erin Nurss, Miss Arizona 2008
Arkansas	Hannah Joiner	Maumelle	17	Miss Teen Greater Little Rock	Tap Dance	Top 10	Preliminary Evening Wear/OSQ Award Preliminary Lifestyle and Fitness Award	
California	Arianna Afsar	San Diego	13	Miss Teen San Diego	Vocal, "Don't Rain on My Parade" from Funny Girl	1st runner-up	Preliminary Talent Award	Top 36 Contestant on American Idol Later Miss California 2010; Top 10 at Miss America 2011 pageant Cast as Elizabeth Schuyler Hamilton in the Chicago production of Hamilton
Colorado	Jocelyn Story	Parker	16		Lyrical Dance	Top 15		
Connecticut	Sarah Lord	Norwich	17		Musical Theatre Dance			
Delaware	Carly Economos	Georgetown	16		Classical Vocal			Contestant at National Sweetheart 2009 pageant
(Washington, D.C.) District of Columbia	Virginia Ryan	Washington D.C.	17		Vocal			
Florida	Sierra Minott	Fort Myers	17	Miss Southwest Florida's Outstanding Teen	Musical Theater Jazz Dance, "Life of the Party"	3rd runner-up	Preliminary Evening Wear/OSQ Award	Later Miss Florida 2008; 4th runner-up at Miss America 2009 pageant
(Georgia (U.S. state)) Georgia	Kristen Springer	Snellville	16	Miss Atlanta's Outstanding Teen	Ballet en Pointe			
Hawaii	Jalee Kate Fuselier	Haleiwa	17		Vocal			Later Miss Hawaii 2010; 2nd runner-up at Miss America 2011 pageant
Idaho	Amanda Workman	American Falls	17		Ballet/Hip Hop Dance			
Illinois	Kathryn Strause	Rock Island	17	Miss Blackhawk Valley's Outstanding Teen	Classical Piano			
Indiana	Sarah Gorecki	LaPorte	16	Miss Duneland's Outstanding Teen	Vocal, "River Deep, Mountain High"	Top 10		
Iowa	Amanda Sabin	Walcott	17	Miss Louisa County's Outstanding Teen	Tap Dance			Later Mrs. Nebraska America 2014 Later Mrs. Nebraska Universal 2016; Later Mrs. USA Universal 2017; Later Mrs. Universal 2017
Kansas	Lauren Susong	Wellington	17		Vocal, "Gimme Gimme" from Thoroughly Modern Millie			
Kentucky	Erin Clark	Louisville	15	Miss Jeffersontown's Outstanding Teen	Musical Theatre Dance			
Louisiana	Bethany Moore	Bastrop	18	Miss Louisiana Harvest Festival's Outstanding Teen	Vocal			
Maine	Katelyn Smith	Enfield	16		Tap Dance			
Maryland	Lindsay Morris	Church Creek	15	Miss Caroline Summerfest's Outstanding Teen	Classical Piano			
Massachusetts	Tanya Lee Bonefant	Taunton	17		Lyrical Dance			
Michigan	Ashley Noelle Loader	Blissfield	17		Ballet en Pointe			
Minnesota	Giselle Marie Ugarte	Minnetonka	16		Jazz Dance			Later Miss Teen Minnesota International 2007 Later 4th runner-up at Miss Minnesota Teen USA 2007
Mississippi	Natalie Wood	Oxford	15		Theatrical Jazz Dance			
Missouri	Airen Ferguson	Hannibal	17		Clogging			
Montana	Jacqueline Ingoin	Lambert	17		Piano			
Nebraska	Jessica States	North Platte	17		Vocal, "I Am What I Am" from La Cage aux Folles			
Nevada	Raechel Prosser	Gardnerville	15		Tap Dance			
New Hampshire	Meghan Lemontagne	Pelham	17		Dance/Twirl			Contestant at National Sweetheart 2009 pageant Later Purdue University's 25th "Golden Girl"
New Jersey	Katie Berry	Mount Laurel	16		Ballet en Pointe	Top 15		Contestant at National Sweetheart 2011 pageant 4th runner-up at Miss New Jersey 2009 pageant 2nd runner-up at Miss New Jersey 2010 and 2011 pageants 1st runner-up to Mallory Hagan at Miss New York 2012 pageant
New Mexico	Sara Elizabeth Ryan	Roswell	16		Tap Dance			
(New York (state)) New York	Amanda Lee Alicea	Huguenot	16	Miss Staten Island's Outstanding Teen	Vocal			
North Carolina	Kayla Moran	Mount Holly	15	Miss Mount Holly's Outstanding Teen	Vocal			
North Dakota	Laura Peinovich	Fargo	17		Jazz Dance			
Ohio	Ali Nance	Warren	15		Musical Theatre Dance	Top 15		
Oklahoma	Becca Hester	Tulsa	17	Miss Oklahoma City University's Outstanding Teen	Vocal	Top 15	Spirit of America Award	
Oregon	Katie Ericson	North Bend	16	Miss Coos County's Outstanding Teen	Classical Piano			
Pennsylvania	Annie Rosellini	Butler	13	At-Large	Lyrical Dance			Later Miss Pennsylvania 2013
Rhode Island	Kacie Ferraro	Wakefield	17		Tap Dance			
South Carolina	Lindley Mayer	Greenville	16	Miss Upstate Teen	Tap Dance	Top 15		Later 1st runner-up at Miss South Carolina 2013 Later Miss South Carolina United States 2016
South Dakota	Hailey Soyland	Madison	17		Vocal, "I Believe"			Currently a country singer who goes by the name "Hailey Steele"
Tennessee	Madeline Littrell	Germantown	16	At-Large	Vocal, "If I Can Dream"	Top 10		
Texas	Meghan Miller	Beaumont	17	Miss Teen Farmer's Branch	Ventriloquism, Disney Medley	Winner	Overall Talent Award Preliminary Evening Wear/OSQ Award Preliminary Talent Award	Appeared on America's Got Talent
Utah	Jennifer Gulbrandsen	Provo	17		Classical Piano	4th runner-up	Preliminary Talent Award	
Vermont	Brittany Rhodes	Jericho	17		Musical Theater Vocal			
Virginia	Elle Elizabeth Bunn	Virginia Beach	16		Vocal			Later 2nd runner-up at Miss Virginia Teen USA 2007
(United States Virgin Islands) Virgin Islands	Shakyma Roshundia Mercado	Saint Croix			Sign Language/Dance			
(Washington (state)) Washington	Shalane Larango	Ridgefield	16	Miss Clark County's Outstanding Teen	Tap/Jazz Dance	2nd runner-up		Later Miss Washington Teen USA 2007 First former Miss America's Outstanding Teen state titleholder to compete in Miss Teen USA pageant
West Virginia	Veronika Ohlinger	Letart	17	Miss Teen South Central	Vocal		Outstanding Academic Achievement Award	Later Miss Montana 2011
Wisconsin	Tonya Popowski	St. Francis	17	Miss West Allis' Outstanding Teen	Baton/Twirl			
Wyoming	Courtney Gifford	Sheridan	17	Miss Sheridan's Outstanding Teen	Art			Later Miss Wyoming 2008 Later Miss Wyoming USA 2013 First former Miss America's Outstanding Teen state titleholder to compete in Miss USA pageant
