= Miss Rhode Island's Teen =

- Formation: 2005
- Type: Scholarship pageant
- Location: Providence, Rhode Island
- Members: Miss America's Teen
- Official language: English
- Key people: Cheryl Cusick
- Website: Official website

The Miss Rhode Island's Teen competition is the pageant that selects the representative for the U.S. state of Rhode Island in the Miss America's Teen pageant.

Honisty Baker of Portsmouth was crowned Miss Rhode Island's Teen on April 25, 2026, at the Historic Park Theatre & Event Center in Cranston, Rhode Island. She competed for the title of Miss America's Teen 2027 on September 5, 2026, at the Kravis Center for the Performing Arts in West Palm Beach, Florida.

== Results summary ==
The year in parentheses indicates the year of the Miss America's Teen competition the award/placement was garnered.

=== Placements ===
- Top 10: Ivy Shen (2012)
- Top 12: Macie Johnson (2019)
- Top 15: Selina Wang (2011), Heather Shen (2014)

=== Awards ===
==== Preliminary awards ====
- Preliminary Evening Wear/On-Stage Question: Heather Shen (2014), Macie Johnson (2019) (tie)
- Preliminary Talent: Emily Luther (2010), Ivy Shen (2012)

==== Non-finalist awards ====
- Non-finalist Evening Wear/On-Stage Question: Caroline Parente (2020)
- Non-finalist Talent: Emily Luther (2010)

==== Other awards ====
- America's Choice: Macie Johnson (2019)
- Outstanding Instrumental Talent: Ivy Shen (2012)
- Scholastic Excellence Award: Heather Shen (2014)
- Spirit of America Award: Gillian Johnston (2023)
- Top 5 Interview: Ivy Shen (2012), Alexandra Coppa (2013)

== Winners ==
- Declared as Winner
- Ended as a runner-up
- Ended as a finalist or semi-finalist

Year	Name	Hometown	Age	Local Title	Talent	Placement at MAO Teen	Special scholarships at MAO Teen	Notes
2026	Honisty Baker	Portsmouth	17	Miss Portsmouth's Teen	Pom Dance			
2025	Ocean Lombard	Westerly	16	N/A	Dance			
2024	Payton Mays	Cranston	17	Miss Cranston West's Teen	Vocal			
2023	Mia Daley	East Greenwich	16	At-Large	Vocal			Later Miss Rhode Island 2026
2022	Gillian Johnston	Warwick	17	At-Large	Dance		Spirit of America Award	
2021	Alexa Johnsen	North Kingstown	17	At-Large	Saxophone			
2019–20	Caroline Parente	South Kingstown	16	N/A	Musical Theatre Vocal, "All Falls Down"		Non-finalist Evening Wear/OSQ Award	Later Miss Rhode Island 2023 and 4th Runner Up at Miss America 2024
2018	Macie Johnson	Wickford	16	N/A	Jazz Dance, "Wonder"	Top 12	America's Choice Preliminary Evening Wear/OSQ Award (tie)	
2017	Caroline Hollingsworth	East Greenwich	15		Piano, 3rd Movement from "Moonlight Sonata" by Beethoven			
2016	Kate DePetro	East Greenwich	16	Miss West Bay's Outstanding Teen	Comedic Monologue			
2015	Catarina Girardi	Cranston	16	Miss Cranston's Outstanding Teen	Dance			
2014	Grace Romanello	South Kingstown	15	Miss Southern Rhode Island's Outstanding Teen	Vocal, "Hit Me With A Hot Note" by Duke Ellington			
2013	Heather Shen	East Greenwich	16	Miss Kent County's Outstanding Teen	Classical Violin	Top 15	Preliminary Evening Wear/OSQ Award Scholastic Excellence Award	Sister of Miss Rhode Island's Outstanding Teen 2011, Ivy Shen
2012	Alexandra Coppa	Cranston	16		Dance		Top 5 Interview Award	Later Miss Rhode Island 2018
2011	Ivy Shen	East Greenwich	16		Classical Violin	Top 10	Outstanding Instrumental Talent Award Preliminary Talent Award Top 5 Interview Award	Sister of Miss Rhode Island's Outstanding Teen 2013, Heather Shen
2010	Selina Wang	Barrington	17	Miss Barrington's Outstanding Teen		Top 15		
2009	Emily Luther	Woonsocket	17		Vocal, "At Last" by Mack Gordon and Harry Warren		Non-finalist Talent Award Preliminary Talent Award	Made viral YouTube cover of Adele's "Someone Like You" with Charlie Puth in 2011; Appeared on The Ellen DeGeneres Show with Puth; Both Puth and Luther were signed onto DeGeneres' label eleveneleven Contestant on The Voice
2008	Angela Angers	Barrington						
2007	Molly Jacobson	Barrington						Previously Miss Teen Rhode Island International 2006
2006	Lindsay Rogers	Lincoln	17		Vocal			Previously National Miss Junior Teen America 2002 3rd runner-up at Miss Rhode Island Teen USA 2005
2005	Kacie Ferraro	Wakefield	17		Tap Dance			
