= Miss Kansas' Teen =

Teen pageant

- Formation: 2004
- Type: Beauty pageant
- Location: Pratt, Kansas
- Members: Miss America's Teen
- Official language: English
- Key people: Stephanie Harris
- Website: Official website

The Miss Kansas' Teen competition is the pageant that selects the representative for the U.S. state of Kansas in the Miss America's Teen pageant.

Ta’Liyah Lewis of Wichita was crowned Miss Kansas' Teen on June 6, 2026, at the Pratt Community College in Pratt, Kansas. She competed for the title of Miss America's Teen 2027 on September 5, 2026, at the Kravis Center for the Performing Arts in West Palm Beach, Florida.

In January 2023, the official name of the pageant was changed from Miss Kansas’ Outstanding Teen, to Miss Kansas’ Teen, in accordance with the national pageant.

== Results summary ==
The year in parentheses indicates year of Miss America's Teen competition the award/placement was garnered.

=== Awards ===
==== Preliminary awards ====
- Preliminary Lifestyle and Fitness: Kristen Boxman (2014)

==== Non-finalist Awards ====
- Non-finalist Talent: Taylor Clark (2018)

==== Other awards ====
- Outstanding Instrumental Talent: Taylor Clark (2018)
- Random Acts of Kindness: Paige Kauffman (2017)
- Miracle Maker Runner-Up, raising $17,000 for Children's Miracle Network Hospitals: Tori Pedruzzi (2020)
- National Fundraiser Winner: Niomi Ndirangu (2023)

== Winners ==
Year	Name	Hometown	Age	Local title	Talent	Placement at MAO Teen	Special scholarships at MAO Teen	Notes
2026	Ta’Liyah Lewis	Wichita	17	Miss Juneteenth ICT’s Teen	Praise Dance			
2025	Bella Andra	Maize	18	Miss Heartland's Teen	Self Defense Demonstration			
2024	Averie Mountain	Andover	14		Acro Dance			Later Miss Kansas Teen Volunteer 2026: Top 12 at Miss Teen Volunteer America 2027
2023	Erin Rolfe	Wichita	17		Vocal			
2022	Niomi Ndirangu	El Dorado	16		Vocal	National Fundraiser Winner Award	First African-American to be crowned Miss Kansas' Outstanding Teen. Later Miss Kansas Teen Volunteer 2024. Preliminary and Non Finalist Talent winner at Miss Teen Volunteer America 2024.	
2021	Gracie Hendrickson	Wichita	16	Miss Johnson County's Outstanding Teen	Vocal, "Over the Rainbow"			Previously Princess of America Junior Ambassador 2018. Later Miss Kansas Teen USA 2022.
2019 (2020*)	Tori Pedruzzi	Wichita	14	Miss Wichita's Outstanding Teen	Lyrical Dance, "Ashes" by Celine Dion		Miracle Maker Runner-Up, raising $17,000 for Children's Miracle Network Hospitals	Titleholder term extended to a second full year in 2020 after state and national pageants postponed due to the COVID-19 pandemic. 3rd Runner Up at Miss Kansas 2025. 3rd Runner Up at Miss Kansas Volunteer 2026.
2018	Amelia Benjamin	Leawood	16		Vocal, "God Bless America"			Previously USA National Miss Kansas Jr. Teen 2017
2017	Taylor Clark	St. John	17	Miss Butler County's Outstanding Teen	Percussion, "Sing, Sing, Sing" and "In the Mood"		Non-finalist Talent Award Outstanding Instrumental Talent Award	Later Miss Kansas 2021
2016	Paige Kauffman	Hesston	17	Miss Harvey County's Outstanding Teen	Vocal		Random Acts of Kindness Award	
2015	Ashley Pringle	Yates Center	17	Miss Hay Capital's Outstanding Teen	Vocal, "O Mio Babbino"			
2014	Megha Gangadhar	Wichita	17	Miss Asian Festival's Outstanding Teen	Bollywood Fusion Dance, "Jai Ho" by The Pussycat Dolls			
2013	Kristen Boxman	Arkansas City	17	Miss Cowley County's Outstanding Teen	Tap Dance, "I Wanna Dance with Somebody" by Whitney Houston		Preliminary Lifestyle & Fitness Award	
2012	Stevie Mack	Wichita	16	Miss Heartland's Outstanding Teen	Musical Theatre Dance, "I Wanna Be a Rockette"			
2011	Caitlyn Webb	Manhattan		Miss Manhattan's Outstanding Teen	Tae Kwon Do, "Stand Out"			
2010	Leslie Carrillo	Wichita	17	Miss Wooded Hills' Outstanding Teen	Vocal, "Kiss Me in the Rain"			
2009	Chelsea Chilcott	Derby	16		Ventriloquism, "Coffee in a Cardboard Cup"			
2008	Alasyn Zimmerman	Derby	14	Miss Sunflower's Outstanding Teen	Dance, "So Much Better" from Legally Blonde			1st runner-up at Miss Colorado 2014 pageant
2007	Maggie Delaney	Overland Park	17	Miss Johnson County's Outstanding Teen	Vocal			
2006	Erica Mahan	Neosho Rapids	17	Miss Capital City's Outstanding Teen	Flute			
2005	Lauren Susong	Wellington	17		Vocal, "Gimme Gimme" from Thoroughly Modern Millie			
2004	Haley Hannah	Leawood	16		Jazz Dance	No national pageant		
