= Miss America's Outstanding Teen 2023 =

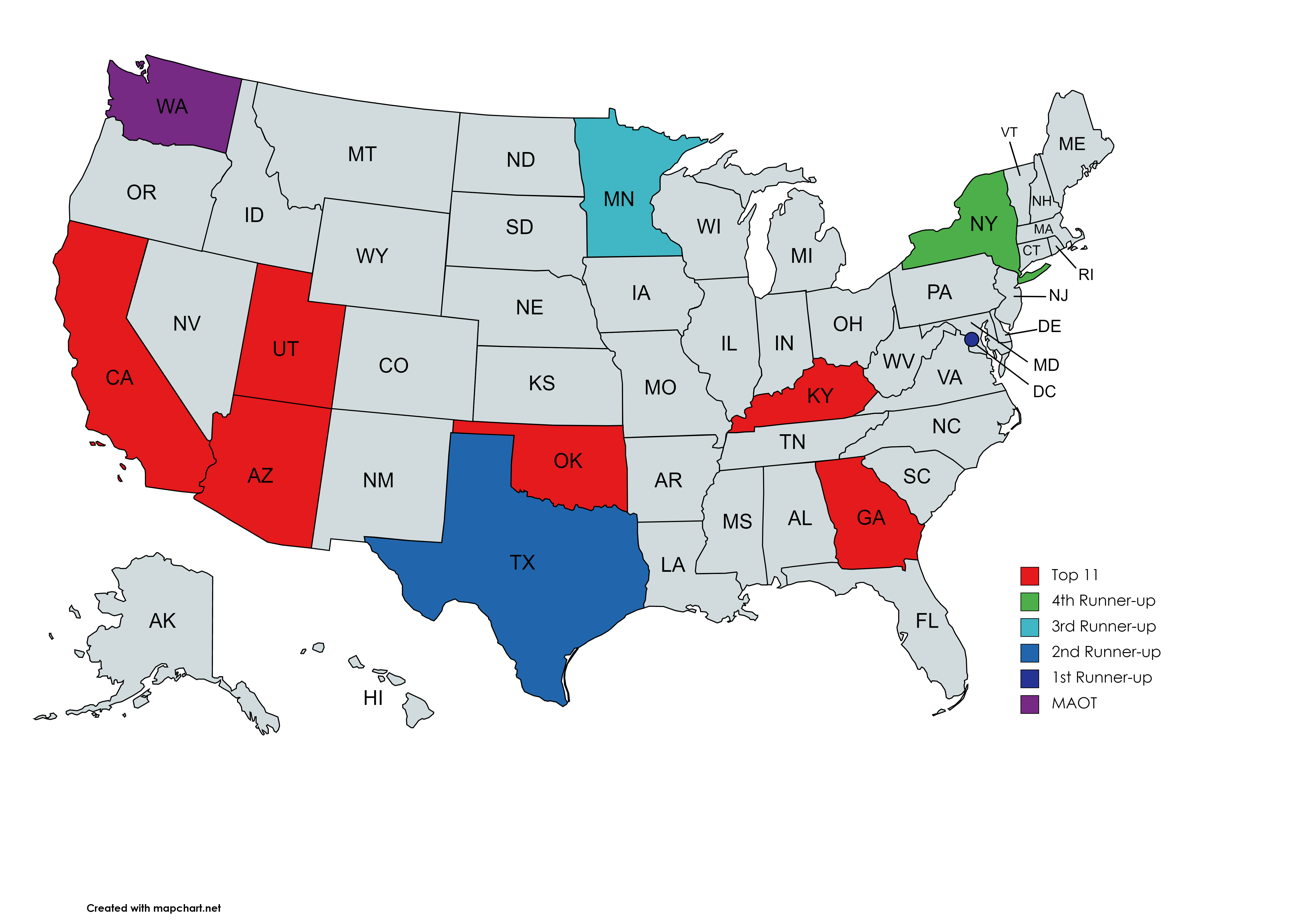
- Date: August 12, 2022
- Presenters: Kelli Finglass
- Venue: Hyatt Regency Dallas, Dallas, Texas, United States
- Entrants: 51
- Placements: 11
- Winner: Morgan Greco; Washington

Miss America's Outstanding Teen 2023 was the sixteenth Miss America's Outstanding Teen pageant, held at the Hyatt Regency Dallas in Dallas, Texas, on August 12, 2022.

Marcelle LeBlanc of Alabama crowned Morgan Greco of Washington as her successor at the end of the event.

== Judges ==
On August 1, 2022, the Miss America Organization announced their panelists for this years national pageant on social media platforms. They are:

- Monica Aldama - head coach for Navarro College's co-ed cheer team from the show Cheer on Netflix
- Nia Imani Franklin - Miss America 2019 and music composer
- James Aguiar - VP Fashion & Creative Director for Modern Luxury
- Nicole Phelps - Miss California USA 2010 and mental health advocate
- Shilah Phillips - Miss Texas 2006 and singer

== Results ==
=== Placements ===
Placement	Contestant
Miss America's Outstanding Teen 2023	Washington – Morgan Greco
1st runner-up	District of Columbia – Lauren Williams
2nd runner-up	Texas – J-Belle Kimbrell
3rd runner-up	Minnesota – Julia Schumacher
4th runner-up	New York – Dajania James
Top 11	Arizona – Saray Ringenbach; California – Olivia DeFrank; Georgia – Rebecca Zheng; Kentucky – Annie Dauk; Oklahoma – Bella Brown; Utah – Jocelyn Osmond

=== Awards ===
==== Preliminary Awards ====
Award	Candidates
Preliminary Evening Gown/OSQ	Minnesota – Julia Schumacher; Connecticut – Peyton Troth
Preliminary Talent	Washington – Morgan Greco; Kentucky – Annie Dauk

==== Teens in Action ====
Results	Candidates	Social Impact Initiative
Winner	Alabama – Hailey Adams	"Hailey's H.U.G.S. - The Fight Against Pediatric Cancer"
1st Runner-Up	California – Olivia DeFrank	"Save The Memories"
2nd Runner-Up	New Hampshire – Corinne Kelly	"Operation Care for Troops: Sending Our Love"
2nd Runner-Up	Pennsylvania – Jersey Gianna Smith	"My True Glory with Alopecia Areata"
Finalists	Arkansas – Ka'Mya Tackett	"Mental Garden: Growing Positive Minds for Our Youth"
Finalists	Connecticut – Peyton Troth	"Peyton's Promise"
Finalists	Massachusetts – Jenna McLaughlin	"Together We Stand: Encouraging Kindness and Perseverance in the Next Generation"
Finalists	Montana – Bronté Bennion	"Magical Minds: Bringing Science and Arts to Youth"
Finalists	Nevada – Megan Dwyer	"Be Bold, Go Gold: Raising Childhood Cancer Awareness"
Finalists	Virginia – Ayana Johnson	"Ayana's R.E.A.D. Initiative"

==== Other Outstanding Teen Awards ====
Award	Candidates
Advertising Sales	Texas – J-Belle Kimbrell
America's Choice	Utah – Jocelyn Osmond
National Fundraiser Winner	Kansas – Niomi Ndirangu
National Fundraiser Runners-Up
National Fundraiser Runners-Up	2nd — South Carolina – Piper Holt
National Fundraiser Runners-Up	3rd — Nevada – Megan Dwyer
National Fundraiser Runners-Up	4th — Minnesota – Julia Schumacher
Non-finalist Interview	Missouri – Mallory Sublette
Spirit of America	Rhode Island – Gillian Johnston
Top Dance Talent	Hawaii – Kylee Amoroso Kawamoto
Top Vocal Talent	Washington – Morgan Greco

== Contestants ==
As of September 5, 2026, all 51 state titleholders have been crowned.

State	Name	Age	Hometown	Talent	Placement	Awards	Notes
Alabama	Hailey Adams	16	Birmingham	Dance, "Proud Mary"		Teens in Action Award Winner	Younger sister of Miss Florida's Outstanding Teen 2019-2020, Hannah Adams
Alaska	Jasmine Frederick	18	Eagle River	Violin			
Arizona	Saray Ringenbach	14	Maricopa	Dance	Top 11		Younger sister of Miss Arizona 2024, Shailey Ringenbach
Arkansas	Ka'Mya Tackett	15	Sherwood	Lyrical Dance		Teens in Action Award Finalist	Later Miss High School America 2024
California	Olivia DeFrank	17	Los Angeles	Piano	Top 11	Teens in Action 1st Runner-up	Younger sister of Miss Ohio's Outstanding Teen 2019-2020, Madison DeFrank
Colorado	Allison Carlson	17	Broomfield	Irish Step Dance			
Connecticut	Peyton Troth	14	Bristol	Rhythmic Tap Dance, "Belle"		Teens in Action Award Finalist Preliminary Evening Wear/OSQ Award	Later Miss Massachusetts Teen Volunteer 2026
Delaware	Brynn String	14	Felton	Tap Dance, "Confident"			Daughter of Miss Delaware 1996, Aimee Michelle Voshell
(Washington, D.C.) District of Columbia	Lauren Williams		Accokeek	Original Spoken Word	1st Runner-up		
Florida	Aashna Shah	15	Wekiwa Springs	Dance			
(Georgia (U.S. state)) Georgia	Rebecca Zhang	18	Johns Creek	Ballet en Pointe	Top 11		
Hawaii	Kylee Amoroso Kawamoto	15	Kaneohe	Contemporary Dance, "Body Love"		Top Dance Talent Award	
Idaho	Reagan Eubanks	18	Idaho Falls	Piano			
Illinois	Mia Fritsch-Anderson	17	Chicago	Irish Dance			
Indiana	Kayla Patterson		Farmland	Vocal			
Iowa	Emily Lerch	17	Fruitland	Baton Twirling, "Conga"			
Kansas	Niomi Ndirangu	16	El Dorado	Vocal		National Fundraiser Award Winner	First African-American to be crowned Miss Kansas' Outstanding Teen Later Miss Kansas Teen Volunteer 2024 Preliminary and Non-finalist Talent Award Winner at Miss Teen Volunteer 2024
Kentucky	Annie Dauk	16	Louisville	Vocal	Top 11	Preliminary Talent Award	
Louisiana	Mary Laura Hunt	16	Ruston	Lyrical Dance			
Maine	Lexi Alcott		Windsor	Monologue			
Maryland	Ryleigh Jackson	16	Germantown	Tap Dance			
Massachusetts	Jenna McLaughlin	17	Medford	Vocal		Teens in Action Award Finalist	
Michigan	Grace Larsen	17	Coloma	Musical Theater Dance			
Minnesota	Julia Schumacher	17	Mankato	Lyrical Dance	3rd Runner-up	Preliminary Evening Wear/OSQ Award National Fundraiser 4th Runner-up	Younger sister of Miss Minnesota's Outstanding Teen 2017 and Miss Minnesota 2024, Emily Schumacher
Mississippi	Cameron Davis	17	Meridian	Dance			
Missouri	Mallory Sublette	17	Palmyra	Dance		Non-finalist Interview Award	
Montana	Bronte Bennion		Sidney	Violin		Teens in Action Award Finalist	Younger sister of Miss Montana's Outstanding Teen 2020-2021, Annika Bennion Daughter of Miss New Mexico USA 1993, Daniela Johnson Bennion
Nebraska	Alexandra Thompson	14	North Platte	Vocal			
Nevada	Megan Dwyer	16	Elko	Monologue		Teens in Action Award Finalist	
New Hampshire	Corrine Kelly	16	Pelham	Irish Dance		Teens in Action 2nd Runner-up	
New Jersey	Maria Lynn Sooy	15	Ocean View	Irish Dance			
New Mexico	Morgan Buhler		Alamogordo	Jazz Dance			
(New York (state)) New York	Dajania James	17	Rochester	Dance	4th Runner-up		
North Carolina	Kerrigan Brown	17	Spivey's Corner	Dance			
North Dakota	Olivia Rossland	17	Williston	Dance			
Ohio	Cassandra Kurek	16	Bucyrus	Vocal, "Think of Me"			
Oklahoma	Bella Brown	16	Choctaw	Vocal, "Pulled"	Top 11		
Oregon	Deja Fitzwater	17	Portland	Classical Vocal, "Les Filles de Cadix"			Later National American Miss Teen 2024-2025 Later Miss Idaho 2026
Pennsylvania	Jersey Gianna Smith	16	Carmichaels	Lyrical Acrobatic Dance		Teens in Action 2nd Runner-up	
Rhode Island	Gillian Johnston	17	Warwick	Dance		Spirit of America Award	
South Carolina	Piper Holt	17	Fountain Inn	Jazz Dance, "Canned Heat"		National Fundraiser 2nd Runner-up	
South Dakota	Olivia Odenbrett	15	Brandon	Contemporary/Lyrical Dance			Later Miss South Dakota Teen USA 2024 Top 20 at Miss Teen USA 2024
Tennessee	Jane Marie Franks	16	Clifton	Vocal, "Piece of Sky"			
Texas	J-Belle Kimbrell	18	Dallas	Vocal	2nd Runner-up	Advertisement Sales Award	
Utah	Jocelyn Osmond	15	Alpine	Piano	Top 11	America's Choice	Later Miss Utah Teen USA 2023 Top 20 at Miss Teen USA 2023 Later Distinguished Young Woman of Utah 2024 Granddaughter of Virl Osmond and great-niece of Donny and Marie Osmond
Vermont	Abagail Hunter	17	Poultney	Broadway Jazz, "They Just Keep Moving the Line"			
Virginia	Ayana Johnson	15	Chesapeake	Musical Theater Dance		Teens in Action Award Finalist	
(Washington (state)) Washington	Morgan Greco	16	Camas	Operatic Vocal, "The Jewel Song"	Winner	Preliminary Talent Award Top Vocal Talent Award	Later Miss Teen International USA 2024
West Virginia	Civita Hooper	16	Colliers	Dance, "Forever Country"			
Wisconsin	Evelyn Rose Green	17	Oshkosh	Baton/Twirl			
Wyoming	Anna Mullinax	15	Sheridan	Piano			First African American to be crowned Miss Wyoming's Outstanding Teen
