= Miss America's Outstanding Teen 2011 =

Beauty pageant edition

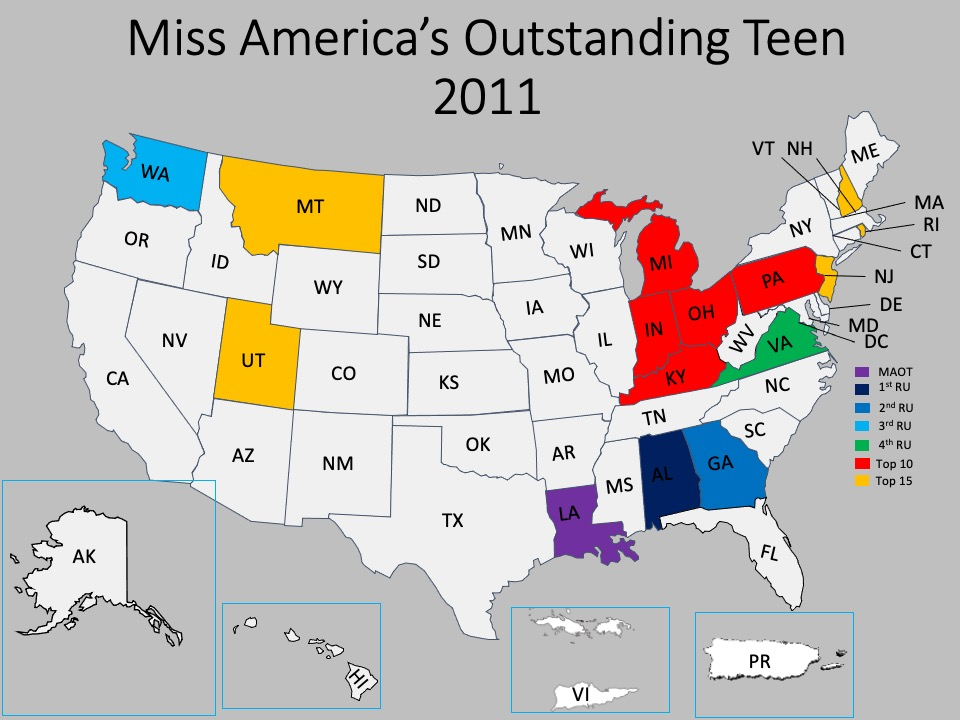
- Miss America's Outstanding Teen 2011 Participants and Results
- Date: August 28, 2010
- Presenters: Caressa Cameron
- Venue: Linda Chapin Theater
- Entrants: 53
- Placements: 15
- Winner: Lacey Russ; Oklahoma

Miss America's Outstanding Teen 2011 was the 6th Miss America's Outstanding Teen pageant, held at the Linda Chapin Theatre in the Orange County Convention Center in Orlando, Florida, on July 29, 2017.

Jeanette Morelan of Wisconsin crowned her successor Lacey Russ of Oklahoma at the end of the event. This was the first time that Miss Oklahoma's Outstanding Teen captured the title of Miss America's Outstanding Teen. Miss America 2010 Caressa Cameron hosted the pageant.

== Results ==
=== Placements ===
Placement	Contestant
Miss America's Outstanding Teen 2011	Oklahoma – Lacey Russ
1st Runner-Up	Alabama – Scarlett Walker
2nd Runner-Up	Georgia – Camille Sims
3rd Runner-Up	Washington – Victoria Renard
4th Runner-Up	Virginia – Courtney Jamison
Top 10	Indiana – Katelyn Marak; Kentucky – Laura Jones; Michigan – Brooke Rowland; Ohio – Cecili Weber; Pennsylvania – Jocelyn Gruber
Top 15	Montana – Amy Fox; New Hampshire – Lauren April; New Jersey – Andie Babusik; Rhode Island – Selina Wang; Utah – Marisa Nielson

== Contestants ==
State	Name	Hometown	Age	Local Title	Talent	Placement	Special Awards	Notes
Alabama	Scarlett Walker	Birmingham	16	Miss Painted Rock's Outstanding Teen	Dance, "The Way You Make Me Feel"	1st Runner-up	Preliminary Talent Award	Daughter of Angela Tower Walker, Miss Alabama 1985 Sister of Callie Walker, Miss Alabama's Outstanding Teen 2012 and Miss Alabama 2018 Later Young Distinguished Woman of Alabama 2012 Cast as an ensemble character in the 2018 Broadway production of Carousel
Alaska	Angelina Klapperich	Wasilla	16		Piano			Contestant at National Sweetheart 2013 Later Miss Alaska 2017 Top 15 and Miss Congeniality at Miss America 2018
Arizona	Elizabeth Stolper	Glendale	16	Miss Phoenix's Outstanding Teen	Dance			
Arkansas	Mackenzie Bryant	Conway	17	Miss Petit Jean Valley's Outstanding Teen	Dance			
California	Shelby Sinkler	Fremont	17	Miss East Bay Cities' Outstanding Teen	Tap Dance, "Fabulous Feet"		Community Service Award	
Colorado	Lexie O'Dowd	Cherry Hills Village	16				Advertising Award	
Connecticut	Logan West	Southington	16	Miss Southington's Outstanding Teen			Preliminary Evening Wear/OSQ Award	Later Miss Connecticut Teen USA 2012 Crowned Miss Teen USA 2012
Delaware	Katelynn Mayers	Newark	15	Miss New Castle County's Outstanding Teen	Dance			1st Runner-up at Miss Delaware 2016
(Washington, D.C.) District of Columbia	Julia Braxton	Washington D.C.	16		Vocal "Your Daddy's Son" from Ragtime			Later Miss Greater Prince William County 2017, Miss Greater Albemarle County 2018 4th Runner Up Miss Virginia 2017
Florida	Mary Katherine Fechtel	Leesburg	14	Miss Orlando's Outstanding Teen	Dance		Non-finalist Talent Award Miss Photogenic	Sister of Miss Florida's Outstanding Teen 2011 and Miss America's Outstanding Teen 2012, Elizabeth Fechtel Later Miss Florida 2015
(Georgia (U.S. state)) Georgia	Camille Sims	Atlanta	17	Miss Capital City's Outstanding Teen	Vocal	2nd Runner-up		Later Miss New York 2016 2nd Runner-up at Miss America 2017
Hawaii	Lena Merrill	Wailuku	15				Spirit of America Award	First deaf person to compete for the title of Miss America's Outstanding Teen
Idaho	Katy Lootens	Marsing	17	At-Large			Outstanding Achievement in Academic Life Award	
Illinois	Kaitlyn Wehr	Moline	16	Miss Blackhawk Valley's Outstanding Teen				
Indiana	Katelyn Marak	Kouts	16	Miss Indiana South's Outstanding Teen	Vocal	Top 10		
Iowa	Aly Olson	Des Moines	17	Miss Capital City's Outstanding Teen			Non-finalist Interview Award	Later Miss Iowa 2014 Top 12 at Miss America 2015
Kansas	Leslie Carrillo	Wichita	17	Miss Wooded Hills' Outstanding Teen	Vocal, "Kiss Me in the Rain"			
Kentucky	Laura Jones	Fisherville	17	Miss Louisville's Outstanding Teen		Top 10	Outstanding Instrumental Talent Award Preliminary Evening Wear/OSQ Award	Later Miss Kentucky 2016 Top 12 at Miss America 2017
Louisiana	Brooke Hotard	Port Allen	16	Miss Crescent City's Outstanding Teen				
Maine	Marybeth Noonan	Raymond	15		Vocal			Later Miss Maine 2016
Maryland	Mary Teal Mulligan	Williamsport		Miss Hagerstown's Outstanding Teen				
Massachusetts	Kendall Wipff	Andover	17	Miss Worcester's Outstanding Teen				
Michigan	Brooke Rowland	Portage	17	Miss Kalamazoo County's Outstanding Teen	Harp	Top 10	Scholastic Excellence Award	
Minnesota	Katarina Akridge	Woodbury	16					
Mississippi	Christina Bostick	Hattiesburg		Miss Leaf River Valley's Outstanding Teen				
Missouri	Alexandria Black	Branson	17	Miss Branson's Outstanding Teen	Vocal			1st Runner-up at Miss Missouri Teen USA 2012 3rd Runner-up at Miss Missouri United States 2014 Later International Junior Miss Missouri 2015
Montana	Amy Fox	Belgrade			Top 15			
Nebraska	Staci Craighead	Omaha	17		Vocal			Daughter of former Nebraska state senator, Joni Craighead
Nevada	Angela Foremaster	North Las Vegas		Miss Clark County's Outstanding Teen				
New Hampshire	Lauren April	Auburn	17		Classical Guitar	Top 15		3rd Runner-up at Miss New Hampshire 2011
New Jersey	Andie Babusik	Gloucester County	14	Miss Atlantic Shore's Outstanding Teen	Ballet en Pointe	Top 15		
New Mexico	Nadine Sanchez	Los Alamos						
(New York (state)) New York	Alison Stroming	New York City		Miss Jubilee's Outstanding Teen			Preliminary Talent Award	
North Carolina	Kayla Hollingsworth	Randleman		Miss Thomasville's Outstanding Teen				
North Dakota	Cara Mund	Bismarck		Miss Red River Valley's Outstanding Teen	Dance			Later Miss North Dakota 2017 Crowned Miss America 2018
Ohio	Cecili Weber	Ironton	15	Miss Portsmouth's Outstanding Teen		Top 10	Preliminary Evening Wear/OSQ Award	Later Miss Arlington 2017 Crowned Miss Virginia 2017 Top 10 at Miss America 2018
Oklahoma	Lacey Russ	Cordell	16	Miss Southwestern Oklahoma State University's Outstanding Teen		Winner	Preliminary Evening Wear/OSQ Award Troy University's Chancellor's Scholarship Award Auburn University Scholarship	
Oregon	Rakiyah Johnson	Portland	15	Miss City of Roses' Outstanding Teen				
Pennsylvania	Jocelyn Gruber	Grove City	17	Miss Greater Johnstown's Outstanding Teen	Piano, "Hungary Rapsodie Mignonne Op. 410" by Carl Kolling	Top 10		2nd Runner-up at Miss Pennsylvania 2014
Puerto Rico	Monica Cristina Arias	Toa Baja	17	Miss Toa Baja's Outstanding Teen				First Puerto Rican to compete in Miss America's Outstanding Teen
Rhode Island	Selina Wang	Barrington	17	Miss Barrington's Outstanding Teen		Top 15		
South Carolina	Caroline Blanton	Conway	15	Miss Myrtle Beach Teen	Vocal			
South Dakota	Emma Thomas	Rapid City	16	Miss Rapid City's Outstanding Teen				
Tennessee	Maggie Belew	Lexington	17	Miss Henderson County's Outstanding Teen	Baton Twirling			
Texas	Madison Fuller	Fairfield	15	Miss Teen Frisco	Ventriloquism			3rd Runner-up at Miss Texas 2014, 2015, and 2016 1st Runner-up at Miss Texas 2017 Later Miss Texas 2018 Older sister of Miss Texas 2021, Mallory Fuller
Utah	Marisa Nielson	Hyrum			Vocal, "I Will Fly" from Little Women	Top 15		
Vermont	Erin Connor	Bridport	15					Later Miss Vermont 2017
Virginia	Courtney Jamison	Richmond	16	Miss Chesterfield's Outstanding Teen	Piano	4th Runner-up	Outstanding Instrumentalist Award Preliminary Evening Wear/OSQ Award Preliminary Talent Award	Later National American Miss 2013-2014 1st Runner-up at Miss Virginia 2015
(United States Virgin Islands) Virgin Islands	Brittney Parillon	Saint Croix						
(Washington (state)) Washington	Victoria Renard	Kennewick	17	Miss Benton County's Outstanding Teen	Dance	3rd Runner-up		Older sister of Miss Washington's Outstanding Teen 2011 and Miss Washington 2017, Nicole Renard
West Virginia	Lacey Cyphers	Mannington		Miss Mountaineer Country's Outstanding Teen				
Wisconsin	Teaka Griesbach	Combined Locks	15	Miss Milwaukee's Outstanding Teen	Dance			1st Runner-up at Miss Wisconsin Teen USA 2013 2nd Runner-up at Miss Wisconsin Teen USA 2014 3rd Runner-up at Miss Wisconsin USA 2016 2nd Runner-up at Miss Wisconsin USA 2017 and 2018 1st runner-up at Miss Wisconsin USA 2019
Wyoming	Chelsea Price	Rock Springs	17	Miss Rock Springs' Outstanding Teen				Miss Southwest Wyoming 2016
