= Miss America's Outstanding Teen 2017 =

American youth beauty pageant

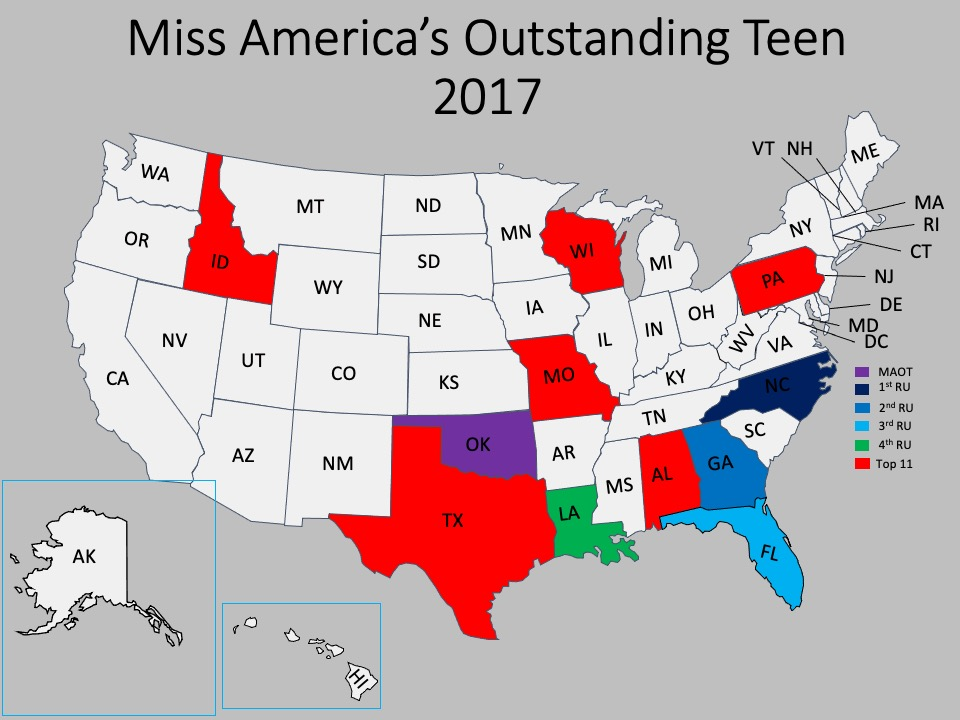
- Miss America's Outstanding Teen 2017 Participants and Results
- Date: August 6, 2016
- Venue: Orange County Convention Center, Orlando, Florida
- Entrants: 51
- Placements: 11
- Winner: Nicole Jia; Oklahoma

Miss America's Outstanding Teen 2017 was the 11th Miss America's Outstanding Teen pageant held at Linda Chapin Theatre in the Orange County Convention Center in Orlando, Florida on August 6, 2016. Allie Nault of New Hampshire crowned her successor Nicole Jia of Oklahoma at the end of the program.

== Results summary ==
=== Placement ===
Placement	Contestant
Miss America's Outstanding Teen 2017	Oklahoma — Nicole Jia
1st Runner-Up	North Carolina — Catherine White
2nd Runner-Up	Georgia — Kelsey Hollis
3rd Runner-Up	Florida — Anjelica Jones
4th Runner-Up	Louisiana — Sarah McCallum
Top 11	Alabama — Tiara Pennington; Idaho — Mady Thornquest; Missouri — Christina Stratton; Pennsylvania — Alysa Bainbridge §; Texas — Heather King; Wisconsin — Kylene Spanbauer

§ America's Choice

=== Top 11 ===
1. Pennsylvania
2. Wisconsin
3. North Carolina
4. Alabama
5. Missouri
6. Texas
7. Oklahoma
8. Idaho
9. Georgia
10. Louisiana
11. Florida

=== Top 5 ===
1. Georgia
2. Florida
3. Louisiana
4. Oklahoma
5. North Carolina

=== Awards ===
==== Preliminary awards ====
Award	Contestants
Preliminary Evening Wear/On-Stage Question (OSQ)	North Carolina - Catherine White; Idaho - Mady Thornquest; Nebraska - Hannah Miller
Preliminary Talent	(Georgia (U.S. state)) Georgia - Kelsey Hollis; Florida - Anjelica Jones; Wisconsin - Kylene Spanbauer

==== Talent awards ====
Awards	Contestants
Dance	Florida - Anjelica Jones; Massachusetts - Alyssa Maitoza
Instrumental	Oklahoma - Nicole Jia; Kentucky - Chapel Tinius
Vocal	(Georgia (U.S. state)) Georgia - Kelsey Hollis; Maine - Madison Leslie

==== Other awards ====
Awards	Contestants
Ad Sales Award	South Carolina - Makayla Stark
Children's Miracle Network (CMN) Miracle Maker	Pennsylvania - Alysa Bainbridge
Miss Congeniality/Spirit of America	Texas - Heather King
Non-finalist Evening Wear/On-Stage Question (OSQ)	Nebraska - Hannah Miller
Non-finalist Interview	Nebraska - Hannah Miller
Non-finalist Talent	Kentucky - Chapel Tinius; Maine - Madison Leslie; Massachusetts - Alyssa Maitoza
Outstanding Achievement in Academic Life	Delaware - Ashley Swanson
Teen in Action	Arkansas - Emily Brewer
Scholastic Excellence	South Carolina - Makayla Stark
Random Acts of Kindness	Kansas - Paige Kauffman

== Contestants ==
Miss America's Outstanding Teen 2017 contestants are:

State	Name	Hometown	Age	Local Title	Talent	Placement	Special Awards	Notes
Alabama	Tiara Pennington	Helena	16	Miss Metropolitan's Outstanding Teen	Vocal, "Patriotic Medley"	Top 11		Later Miss Alabama 2019
Alaska	Danielle Stam	Anchorage	16	Miss Anchorage's Outstanding Teen	Interpretive Flamenco			
Arizona	Elan Morris	Chandler	17	Miss Surprise's Outstanding Teen	Dance			
Arkansas	Emily Brewer	Little Rock	17	Miss Greater Little Rock's Outstanding Teen	Tap Dance		Teen in Action Award	
California	Jenna Tower	Garden Grove	17	Miss Garden Grove's Outstanding Teen				
Colorado	Makenzie Matz	Timnath	17	Miss Fort Collins' Outstanding Teen				
Connecticut	Samantha Anderson	Wolcott	17	Miss Constitution's Outstanding Teen				
Delaware	Ashley Swanson	Wilmington	16	Miss Wilmington's Outstanding Teen			Outstanding Achievement in Academic Life Award	
(Washington, D.C.) District of Columbia	Nilah Pettus	Washington D.C.	16		Dance		2nd Place in Ad Sales	
Florida	Anjelica Jones	Jacksonville	16	Miss Orlando's Outstanding Teen	Contemporary Ballet	3rd runner-up	Preliminary Talent, Outstanding Dance Talent	Previously Miss Junior High School America 2013
(Georgia (U.S. state)) Georgia	Kelsey Hollis	Warner Robins	16	Miss Houston County's Outstanding Teen	Vocal	2nd runner-up	Preliminary Talent, Outstanding Vocal Talent	
Hawaii	Carly Yoshida	Waikoloa	16					
Idaho	Mady Thornquest	Twin Falls	15	Miss Magic Valley's Outstanding Teen		Top 11	Preliminary Evening Wear/OSQ	
Illinois	Christine Bryant	Marion	17	Miss Southern Illinois' Outstanding Teen				
Indiana	Jordan Axel	Kendallville	17	Miss Fort Wayne's Outstanding Teen	Tap Dance			
Iowa	Julia Campbell	DeWitt	16	Miss Clinton County's Outstanding Teen				
Kansas	Paige Kauffman	Hesston	17	Miss Harvey County's Outstanding Teen	Vocal		Random Acts of Kindness Award	
Kentucky	Chapel Tinius	Bowling Green	16	Miss Horse Capital of the World's Outstanding Teen			Outstanding Instrumental Talent Award, Non-Finalist Talent	
Louisiana	Sarah McCallum	Farmerville	15	Miss Louisiana Watermelon Festival's Outstanding Teen		4th runner-up		
Maine	Madison Leslie	Lewiston	16		Vocal		Outstanding Vocal Talent Award, Non-Finalist Talent	
Maryland	Allison LaForce	Damascus	17	Miss Mountain City's Outstanding Teen				
Massachusetts	Alyssa Maitoza	Dartmouth	16	Miss New Bedford's Outstanding Teen			Outstanding Dance Talent Award, Non-Finalist Talent	Miss Bristol County 2018
Michigan	Kendra Lodewyk	Bay City	14	Miss Auburn/Midland's Outstanding Teen				
Minnesota	Cali Weddle	Andover		Miss River Valley's Outstanding Teen				
Mississippi	Stella Ford	Brandon	17	Miss Southern Grace's Outstanding Teen				
Missouri	Christina Stratton	Sedalia		Miss Kansas City's Outstanding Teen		Top 8	2nd Place in Ad Sales	Previously Miss Missouri Teen USA 2015, Top 15 and Miss Photogenic at Miss Teen USA 2015
Montana	Faith Johnson	Helena	16					
Nebraska	Hannah Miller	Elkhorn		Miss Omaha's Outstanding Teen			Preliminary Evening Wear/OSQ, Non-Finalist Interview, Non-Finalist Evening Wear/OSQ	
Nevada	Heather Renner	Reno	15					
New Hampshire	Teghan Gregson	Derry			Tap Dance, "Hand Jive"			
New Jersey	Nina Mojares	Freehold	16	Miss Monmouth County's Outstanding Teen	Vocal			
New Mexico	Madison Belcher		16	Miss Portales' Outstanding Teen				
(New York (state)) New York	Lauryn Whitfield	Rochester	16	Miss Upstate New York's Outstanding Teen				
North Carolina	Catherine White	Clayton	17	Miss Clayton's Outstanding Teen		1st runner-up	Preliminary Evening Wear/OSQ	
North Dakota	Lyndsey Scheurer	Bismarck						
Ohio	Madison Heichel	Lexington	15	Miss Shawnee's Outstanding Teen				
Oklahoma	Nicole Jia	Oklahoma City	17	Miss Bethany's Outstanding Teen		Winner	Outstanding Instrumental Talent Award	
Oregon	Abigail Hoppe	Salem	17	Miss Three Rivers' Outstanding Teen				
Pennsylvania	Alysa Bainbridge	Leesport	17	Miss State Capitol's Outstanding Teen		Top 11	America's Choice, CMN Miracle Maker Award, 2nd Place in Ad Sales	
Rhode Island	Kate DePetro	East Greenwich	16	Miss West Bay's Outstanding Teen	Comedic Monologue			
South Carolina	Makayla Stark	Inman	17	Miss Clemson Teen			1st Place in Ad Sales, Scholastic Excellence Award	
South Dakota	Hunter Widvey	Rapid City	17	Miss Rapid City's Outstanding Teen				Later Miss South Dakota 2022
Tennessee	Leah Humble	Sevierville	16	Miss Music City's Outstanding Teen				
Texas	Heather King	Frisco	17	Miss Frisco's Outstanding Teen		Top 8	Spirit of America Award	
Utah	Madeline Pettit	Bountiful	16	Miss Davis County's Outstanding Teen				
Vermont	Alexandra Diehl	St. Albans	15					Later Miss Vermont Teen USA 2018
Virginia	Emily Allara	Salem	14	Miss Roanoke Valley's Outstanding Teen	Dance			
(Washington (state)) Washington	Vivian Dao	Auburn	16	Miss Liberty's Outstanding Teen	Piano, "Game of Thrones Theme" by Ramin Djawadi			
West Virginia	Grace Aulabaugh	Martinsburg	16	Miss Berkeley County's Outstanding Teen				
Wisconsin	Kylene Spanbauer	Fond du Lac	17	Miss Fond du Lac's Outstanding Teen	Dance/Twirl, "Explosive" by Bond	Top 11	Preliminary Talent	
Wyoming	Rae Lee Klein	Cheyenne	17					
