= Miss Colorado's Teen =

- Formation: 2005
- Type: Beauty pageant
- Headquarters: Parker
- Location: Colorado
- Members: Miss America's Teen
- Official language: English
- Website: Official website

For the state pageant affiliated with Miss Teen USA, see Miss Colorado Teen USA

The Miss Colorado's Teen competition is the pageant that selects the representative of the U.S. state of Colorado in the Miss America's Teen pageant.

Michelle Mann of Parker was crowned Miss Colorado's Teen on June 13, 2026, at the Bunker Auditorium in the Green Center at the Colorado School of Mines in Golden, Colorado. She competed for the title of Miss America's Teen 2027 on September 5, 2026, at the Kravis Center for the Performing Arts in West Palm Beach, Florida.

In January 2023, the official name of the pageant was changed from Miss Colorado’s Outstanding Teen, to Miss Colorado’s Teen, in accordance with the national pageant.

== Results summary ==
The following is a visual summary of the results present in table seen below. The year in parentheses indicates year of Miss America's Outstanding Teen competition the award/placement was garnered.

=== Placements ===
- Top 10: Meredith Winnefeld (2012)
- Top 12: Abigail Schwartz (2015), Sara Al-Bazali (2019)
- Top 15: Jocelyn Story (2006), Caitlin Quisenberry (2014)

=== Awards ===
==== Other awards ====
- Miss Congeniality/Spirit of America: Janelle Orsborn (2010)
- Advertising Award: Lexie O'Dowd (2011)
- America's Choice Award: Caitlin Quisenberry (2014)
- Scholastic Excellence Award: Molly Casey (2013)
- Teens in Action Award Finalist: Michelle Mann (2027)

== Winners ==
- Declared as Winner
- Ended as a runner-up
- Ended as a finalist or semi-finalist

Year	Name	Hometown	Age	Local title	Talent	Placement at MAO Teen	Special scholarships at MAO Teen	Notes
2026	Michelle Mann	Parker	17	Miss Lone Tree's Teen	Lyrical Dance		Teens in Action Award Finalist	
2025	Madelynn Nackerud	Westminster	17	Miss Westminster's Teen	Lyrical Dance			Later Miss Colorado Volunteer 2027
2024	Maddie Coombes	Parker	16	Miss Rocky Mountain's Teen	Lyrical Dance			
2023	Olivia "Liv" Newman	Colorado Springs	18	Miss Southern Colorado's Teen	Musical Theater Vocal			
2022	Allison Carlson	Broomfield	17	Miss Rocky Mountain's Outstanding Teen	Irish Step Dance			
2021	Savannah Watson	Elizabeth	18	Miss Eastern Colorado’s Outstanding Teen	Martial Arts	Did not compete		2nd runner-up at the 2021 competition. Assumed title when Sacha was asked to step down. Later Miss Colorado Volunteer 2026.
2021	Lila Sacha	Centennial	18	Miss Centennial’s Outstanding Teen	Lyrical Dance			Was asked to step down by the Miss Colorado Organization in 2021. Her title was reinstated in 2024 by new Miss America leadership.
2020	No national pageant held. (Note: Pageant cancelled after state and national pageants postponed to 2021 due to the COVID-19 pandemic, but duties to be "performed by...women in the Forever Miss Colorado Sisterhood, as needed...")							
2019	Natalie Orsborn	Brighton	17		Acrobatic Dance, "The Way I Am"			Younger sister of Miss Colorado’s Outstanding Teen 2009, Janelle Orsborn
2018	Sara Al-Bazali	Denver	16		Vocal, "How to Return Home"	Top 12	Top 5 Interview	
2017	Jordyn Penney	Johnstown	17		Dance			
2016	Mackenzie Matz	Timnath	17	Miss Fort Collins' Outstanding Teen	Acrobatic Dance			
2015	Maggie O'Grady	Fort Collins	15	Miss Northern Colorado's Outstanding Teen	Baton Twirling			
2014	Abigail Schwartz	Broomfield			Piano		Top 12	
2013	Caitlin Quisenberry	Cherry Creek			Vocal	Top 15	America's Choice Award	4th runner-up at Miss Colorado 2018 Competition
2012	Molly Casey	Denver			Vocal		Scholastic Excellence Award	2nd runner-up at the Miss Colorado 2021 Competition
2011	Meredith Winnefeld	Highlands Ranch	17		Dance/Twirl	Top 10		Miss Colorado 2017
2010	Lexie O'Dowd	Cherry Hills Village	16					
2009	Janelle Orsborn	Brighton	17		Vocal		Spirit of America Award	Older sister of Miss Colorado’s Outstanding Teen 2019, Natalie Orsborn 1st runner-up at Miss Colorado 2015 Competition
2008	Caley-Rae Pavillard	Castle Rock	14		Dance, "I Want to be a Rockette"			Previously Miss Colorado Teen USA 2011; Top 15 at Miss Teen USA 2011 pageant Later Miss Colorado USA 2016
2007	Paige Story	Parker						
2006	Kelci Johnston	Pueblo West	16		Piano/Vocal			
2005	Jocelyn Story	Parker	16		Lyrical Dance	Top 15		
