= Miss North Dakota =

Beauty pageant competition

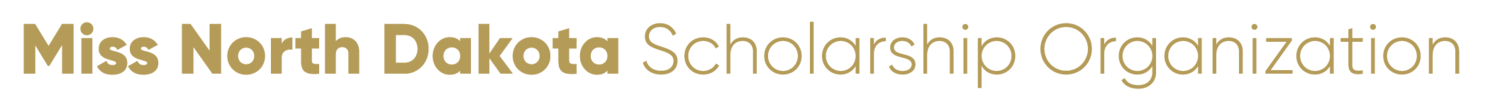
- Formation: 1949
- Type: Beauty pageant
- Headquarters: Williston
- Location: North Dakota
- Members: Miss America
- Official language: English
- President: Debbie Richter
- Website: www.missnorthdakota.org

The Miss North Dakota competition is the pageant that selects the representative for the state of North Dakota in the Miss America pageant. The first Miss North Dakota to compete at Miss America was Kitty Page in 1949. In 2017, Cara Mund became the first North Dakotan to win the Miss America title, when she won the Miss America 2018 pageant.

Emma Tong of Williston was crowned Miss North Dakota on June 13, 2026, at Bakken Auditorium in Williston, North Dakota. She competed for the title of Miss America 2027 on September 6, 2026, at the Kravis Center for the Performing Arts in West Palm Beach, Florida.

== Gallery of past titleholders ==
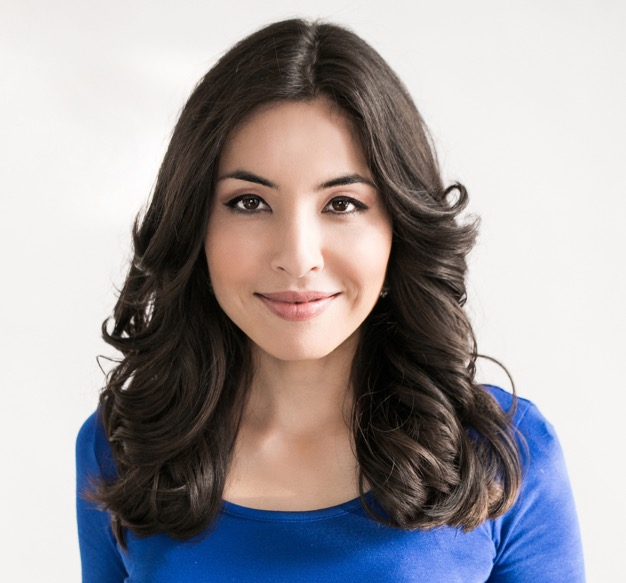
Roxana Saberi,
Miss North Dakota 1997

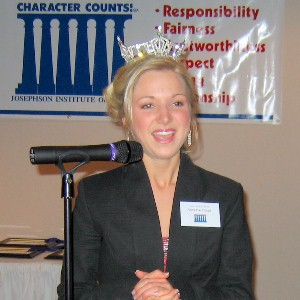
Annette Olson,
Miss North Dakota 2006

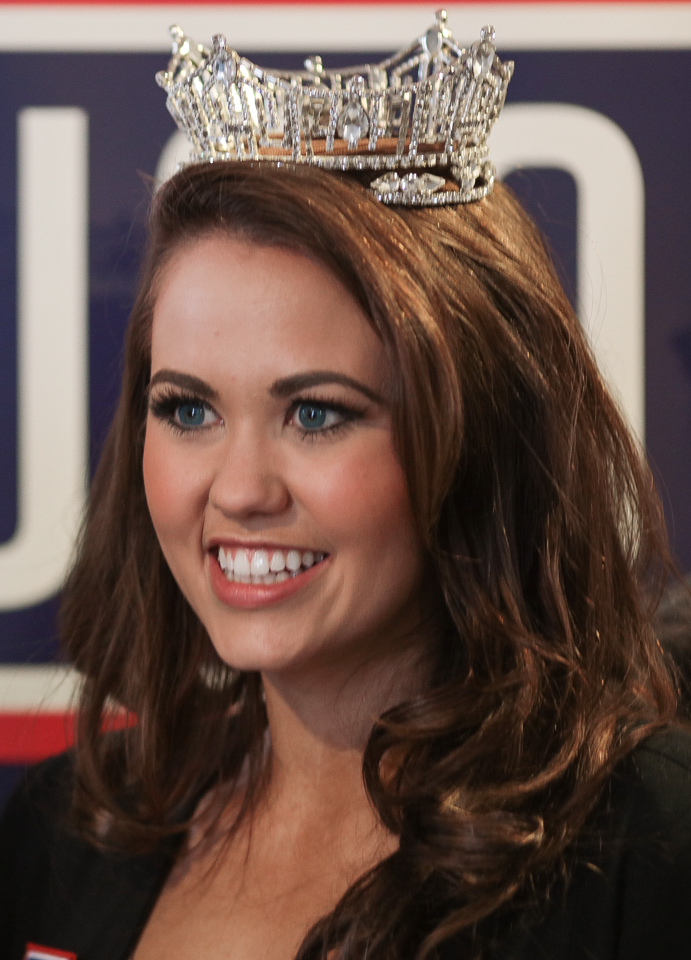
Cara Mund,
Miss North Dakota 2017 and Miss America 2018

== Results summary ==
The following is a visual summary of the past results of Miss North Dakota titleholders at the national Miss America pageants/competitions. The year in parentheses indicates the year of the national competition during which a placement and/or award was garnered, not the year attached to the contestant's state title.

=== Placements ===
- Miss America: Cara Mund (2018)
- Top 10: Donna Grotberg (1977), Tina Curran (1989), Roxana Saberi (1998)
- Top 16: Jacky Arness (2015)

=== Awards ===
==== Preliminary awards ====
- Preliminary Talent: Karen Kopseng (1965), Rosie Sauvageau (2013)
- Preliminary Evening Gown: Sophia Richards (2025)

==== Non-finalist awards ====
- Non-finalist Talent: Joan Teets (1950), Margaret Aandahl (1953), Claudia Gullickson (1960), Denise Fledderman (1967), Georgia Ann Becker (1973), Daureen Podenski (1980), Rosie Sauvageau (2013)

==== Other awards ====
- Miss Congeniality: Ashley Young (2008), Jacky Arness (2015)
- Miss America Scholar: Roxana Saberi (1998)
- Quality of Life Award 1st runners-up: Cara Mund (2018)

== Winners ==
- Declared as winner
- Ended as a runner-up
- Ended as a finalist or semi-finalist

Year	Name	Hometown	Age	Local Title	Miss America Talent	Placement at Miss America	Special scholarships at Miss America	Notes
2026	Emma Tong	Williston		Miss Fargo	Lyrical Dance			Previously Miss North Dakota's Outstanding Teen 2021
2025	Kennedy DeLap	Bismarck	24	Miss Central Dakota	HER Story			
2024	Sophia Richards	Hope	23	Miss West Fargo	Vocal, "La Vie En Rose"		Preliminary Evening Gown	First Miss North Dakota to be awarded Preliminary Evening Gown Award at Miss America Later Miss North Dakota USA 2026
2023	Sydney Helgeson	Bismarck	22	Miss Red River Valley Fair	Vocal			Previously Miss North Dakota's Outstanding Teen 2017
2022	Sidni Kast	Minot	24	Miss Grand Forks	Piano, "Somebody to Love"			
2021	Reyna Bergstrom	Fargo	25	Miss State Capitol	Vocal			
2019–20	Haley D. Wolfe	Carrington	21	Miss West Fargo	Dance			Previously Distinguished Young Woman of North Dakota 2016
2018	Katie Olson	Williston	20	Miss Fargo	Lyrical Dance, "I Will Wait"			
2017	Lizzie Jensen	Fargo	23	Miss West Fargo	Vocal, "Hallelujah"	Did not compete; originally first runner-up, later assumed the title after Mund was named Miss America 2018		
2017	Cara Mund	Bismarck	23	Miss Northern Lights	Jazz Dance, "The Way You Make Me Feel"	Winner	Quality of Life Award 1st runner-up	Previously Miss North Dakota's Outstanding Teen 2010 4th runner-up at Miss North Dakota Teen USA 2012 pageant
2016	Macy Christianson	Minot	19	Miss Grand Forks	Contemporary Ballet			Later Miss North Dakota USA 2020
2015	Delanie Wiedrich	Hazen	19	Miss Grand Forks	Vocal, "A New Life" from Jekyll & Hyde			Delanie Jane Wiedrich is a native of Tracy, California.
2014	Jacky Arness	Fargo	21	Miss Peace Garden	Vocal, "Feeling Good"	Top 16	Judges' Choice Miss Congeniality	1st runner-up at Miss North Dakota USA 2018 pageant
2013	Laura Harmon	Grand Forks	23	Miss Grand Forks	Vocal, "’O sole mio"			
2012	Rosemary (Rosie) Elizabeth Sauvageau	Fargo	24	Miss Fort Abercrombie	Piano / Vocal, "To Make You Feel My Love"		Preliminary Talent Award Non-finalist Talent Award	First black woman to be named Miss North Dakota
2011	Ariana Walker	Bismarck	20	Miss State Capitol	Contemporary Lyrical Dance, "Defying Gravity" from Wicked			Previously Miss North Dakota's Outstanding Teen 2008 Previously Miss North Dakota Teen USA 2010
2010	Beth Dennison	Hutchinson, MN	21	Miss Grand Forks	Modern Dance, "All'improvviso Amore"			Eligible as a student at the University of North Dakota
2009	Katherine (Katie) Elise Ralston	Carrington	22	Miss Red River Valley	Vocal, "One Hundred Easy Ways" from Wonderful Town			
2008	Tessie Louise Jones	West Fargo	21	Miss Dickinson	Piano			Contestant at National Sweetheart 2007 pageant
2007	Ashley Anne Young	Grand Forks	20	Miss Grand Forks	Classical Vocal, "Adele's Laughing Song" from Die Fledermaus		Miss Congeniality	
2006	Annette Ellen Olson	Baldwin	23	Miss Peace Garden	Vocal, "Don't It Make My Brown Eyes Blue"			Contestant at National Sweetheart 2005 pageant
2005	Jacqueline Marie Johnson	Fargo	20	Miss Red River Valley	Cello, "Julio"			
2004	Ashley Jo Ford	Cavalier	21	Miss Potato Queen	Vocal, "There You Are"			
2003	Sara Marie Schelkoph	Grand Forks	23	Miss Fort Abercrombie	Lyrical Ballet, "Somewhere"			
2002	Stacey lynn Thomas	Bismarck	19	Miss Fort Abercrombie	Jazz en Pointe, "Sparkling Diamonds" from Moulin Rouge!			Previously Miss North Dakota's Outstanding Teen 1999 Previously Miss North Dakota Teen USA 2001
2001	Jillayne Ann Mertens	Motley, MN	19	Miss North Dakota State College of Science	Violin / Vocal, "Look to the Rainbow" from Finian's Rainbow			
2000	Carrie Ann Haberstroh	Lisbon	21	Miss Red River Valley	Classical Piano, Prelude in C sharp minor by Rachmaninoff			
1999	Kathryn (Kay) Ruth Picconatto	Minot	21	Miss Dakota Territory	Vocal, "Journey to the Past"			
1998	Sonja Marie Gedde	Fargo	18	Miss Fargo	Piano, "Malagueña"			
1997	Roxana Saberi	Fargo	20	Miss Fargo	Classical Piano, Prelude in G minor by Rachmaninoff	Top 10	Miss America Scholar	Gained attention in 2009 after being imprisoned for 100 days for alleged espionage in Iran
1996	Stephanie Lee Hamilton	Williston	18	Miss Williston	Lyrical Dance, "On My Knees"			
1995	Kimberly (Kim) Ann Cooley	Grand Forks	24	Miss Potato Bowl	Tap Dance, "Luck Be a Lady"			
1994	Nicci Elkins	Grand Forks	21	Miss Red River Valley	Tap Dance			Previously Miss North Dakota Teen USA 1991; Top 6 at Miss Teen USA 1991 pageant
1993	Suzanne Janelle Spilde	Casselton	24	Miss Pride of the Prairie	Vocal, "On a Wonderful Day like Today" from The Sweetheart Tree			
1992	Stephanie Jean Fisher	Larimore	24	Miss Watford City	Vocal, "Until Now"			
1991	VanNessa Straub	Fargo	24	Miss US Durum	Piano, Warsaw Concerto			
1990	Lezlie Joan Lund	Tolna	23	Miss US Durum	Vocal, "Time Heals Everything" from Mack & Mabel			
1989	Susan Jacobson	Grand Forks	23	Miss Potato Bowl	Vocal / Dance, "One Night Only"			
1988	Tina Marie Curran	Grand Forks	21	Miss Oil Country	Ballet en Pointe, "Capriccio Espagnol"	Top 10		
1987	Susan Campbell	Grand Forks	20	Miss Grand Forks	Lyrical Dance			
1986	Barbara Ann Kerzman	Minot	23	Miss Ward County	Semi-classical Vocal, "Love Is Where You Find It"			
1985	Elizabeth Anne Jaeger	Fargo	25	Miss Fargo	Jazz Dance			Previously Miss North Dakota USA 1983; 4th runner-up at Miss USA 1983 pageant
1984	Callie Lynn Northagen	Grand Forks	21	Miss Red River Valley	Piano			
1983	Phyllis Jeanette Hankey	Park River	22	Miss Mayville State College	Vocal, "If You Believe" from The Wiz			
1982	Jeana Wolf	Rugby	21	Miss Red River Valley	Tap Dance, "You're a Grand Old Flag" & "Give My Regards to Broadway"			
1981	Stacie Anfinson	Hettinger	21	Miss Dickinson	Vocal, "I Only Want to Say"			
1980	Karen Moe	Minot	20	Miss Minot	Popular Vocal			
1979	Daureen Podenski	Edgeley	22	Miss LaMoure County	Classical Vocal, "Vissi d'arte" from Tosca		Non-finalist Talent Award	
1978	Shelia Jean Lindeman	Linton	20	Miss Valley City	Popular Vocal, "Woman in the Moon" from A Star Is Born			
1977	Kathryn L. Power	Beulah	22	Miss North Dakota State Potato Queen	Classical Vocal, "Adele's Laughing Song" from Die Fledermaus			
1976	Donna Grotberg	Valley City	18	Miss Valley City	Piano, "The Cat and the Mouse"	Top 10		
1975	Cathy Marie Woell	Minot	19	Miss Minot	Vocal, "Yes"			
1974	Susan Kay Myhr	Bottineau	18	Miss Bottineau	Vocal, "You're Gonna Hear From Me" & Don't Rain on My Parade			
1973	Linda Joyce Cole	Lisbon	19	Miss Valley City	Classical Vocal, "Winds in the South"			
1972	Georgia Ann Becker	Napoleon	18	Miss Kidder County	Country Western Vocal, "Rose Garden"		Non-finalist Talent Award	
1971	Lana Jean Herreid	Williston	20	Miss Williston	Original Vocal Composition, "From Life"			
1970	Nancy Jean Tangen	Northwood	19	Miss Grand Forks	Classical Vocal, "Pace pace mio Dio" from La forza del destino			
1969	Charlene Hope Seifert	Gascoyne	21	Miss Bowman	Comedy Monologue, "Sleeping Beauty"			
1968	Virginia Lee Hanson	Bismarck	21	Miss Grand Forks	Semi-classical Vocal, "This Is My Country"			
1967	Wanda Lou Lowry	Bismarck	18	Miss Parshall	Classical Vocal, "Je veux vivre" from Roméo et Juliette			
1966	Denise Lee Fledderman	Inkster	20	Miss Langdon	Popular Vocal		Non-finalist Talent Award	
1965	Onalee Louise Olson	Fargo	19	Miss Fargo	Original Interpretive Dance "Charleston"			
1964	Karen Victoria Kopseng	Bismarck	19	Miss Grand Forks	Classical Vocal, "Un Bel Di" from Madama Butterfly		Preliminary Talent Award	
1963	JoAnn Syvrud	Mandan		Miss Dickinson	Vocal Ballad & Guitar			
1962	Claudia Ellen Revland	Fargo	19	Miss Fargo	Vocal & Guitar			
1961	Diane Leda Ulvedal	Grand Forks	18	Miss Grand Forks	Piano, "Gavotte in B Major" by Bach			
1960	Carol Ruth Olson	Fargo	21	Miss Fargo	Dramatic Monologue from Mary Stuart			Carol Ruth Olson Larsen died at 86 on November 11, 2024 in Minneapolis, Minnesota.
1959	Claudia Jean Gullickson	Grand Forks	18		Classical Vocal, "Carissima"		Non-finalist Talent Award	
1958	Helen Estelle Korfhage	Grand Forks			Classical Vocal, "If Thou Lov'st Me"			
1957	Helen Jane Winje	Minot			Vocal			
1956	Janet Elizabeth Smith	Steele			Drama			
1955	Mary Ann Gibbs	Williston			Vocal			
1954	Delores Ann Paulson	Bismarck			Violin, "Méditation" from Thaïs			
1953	Marilyn Joy Wentz	Napoleon			Vocal			
1952	Margaret Winnifred Aandahl	Litchville	22		Piano Solo		Non-finalist Talent Award	
1951	Marilyn Jean Walker	Minot	19		Painting Display			Marilyn Jean Walker Polsfut died at age 89 on August 16, 2021, in Denver, Colorado.
1950	Clarice Joan Teets	Minot	19		Comedy Monologue, "Touch of Norway"		Non-finalist Talent Award	Clarice Joan Teets Kern, who later became a minister, died on September 7, 2006, in Sarasota, Florida at the age of 75 after suffering a stroke.
1949	Kitty Gates Page	Bismarck			Tap Dance & Baton Twirling			
1935–48	No North Dakota representative at Miss America pageant							
1934	No national pageant was held							
1933	No North Dakota representative at Miss America pageant							
1932	No national pageants were held							
1931	No national pageants were held							
1930	No national pageants were held							
1929	No national pageants were held							
1928	No national pageants were held							
1927	No North Dakota representative at Miss America pageant							
1926	No North Dakota representative at Miss America pageant							
1925	No North Dakota representative at Miss America pageant							
1924	No North Dakota representative at Miss America pageant							
1923	No North Dakota representative at Miss America pageant							
1922	No North Dakota representative at Miss America pageant							
1921	No North Dakota representative at Miss America pageant							
