= Cara Mund =

American beauty pageant winner (born 1993)

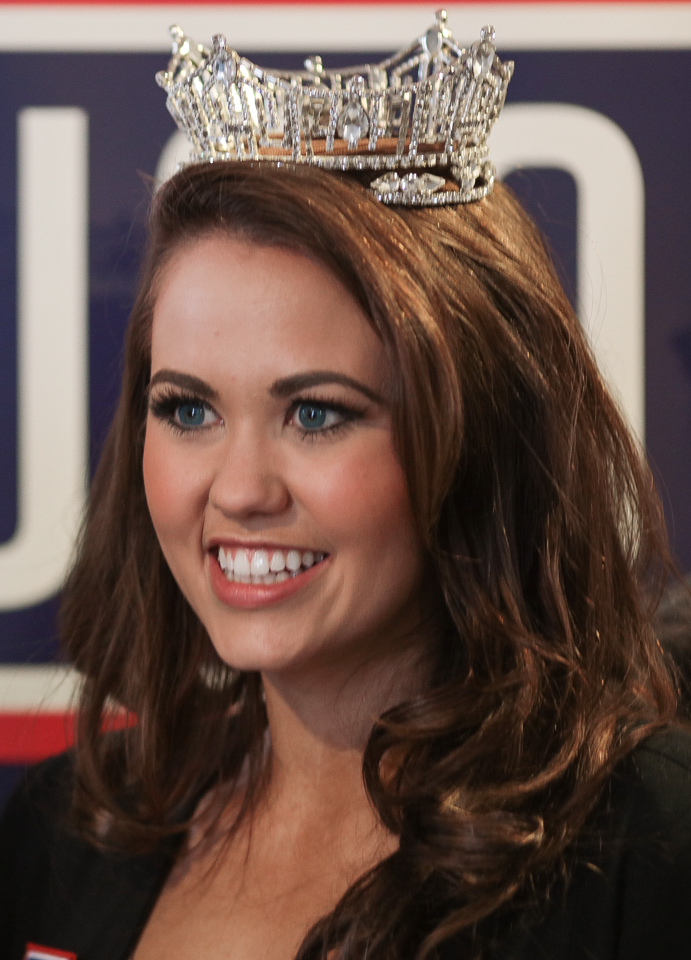
- Born: December 8, 1993 (age 32); Bismarck, North Dakota, U.S.
- Education: Brown University (BA); Harvard University (JD)
- Political party: Republican (2024–present)
- Other political affiliations: Independent (2022–2024)
- Beauty pageant titleholder
- Title: Miss North Dakota's Outstanding Teen 2010; Miss Northern Lights 2017; Miss North Dakota 2017; Miss America 2018
- Hair color: Natural Brunette
- Eye color: Blue
- Website: caramund.com

Cara D. Mund (/ˈkɑːrə/ KAR-ə; born December 8, 1993) is an American attorney and former Miss America from Bismarck, North Dakota. In June 2017, she was crowned Miss North Dakota 2017. On September 10, 2017, she was crowned Miss America 2018 in Atlantic City and became the first contestant from North Dakota to win the competition.

== Early life and education ==
Mund was born in Bismarck, North Dakota to DeLora Kautzmann-Mund and Doug Mund.

Mund is a choreographer and dancer. In high school, she trained four summers with the Radio City Rockettes and was named one of their "Successful Rockette Women" in 2019. Since the age of 14, Mund has organized an annual fundraising fashion show benefiting the Make-a-Wish Foundation. In high school, Mund served as her school's National Honor Society president, graduated as one of her class' valedictorians, and was voted "most likely to become Miss America." In 2024, Mund was inducted into her high school's Hall of Fame.

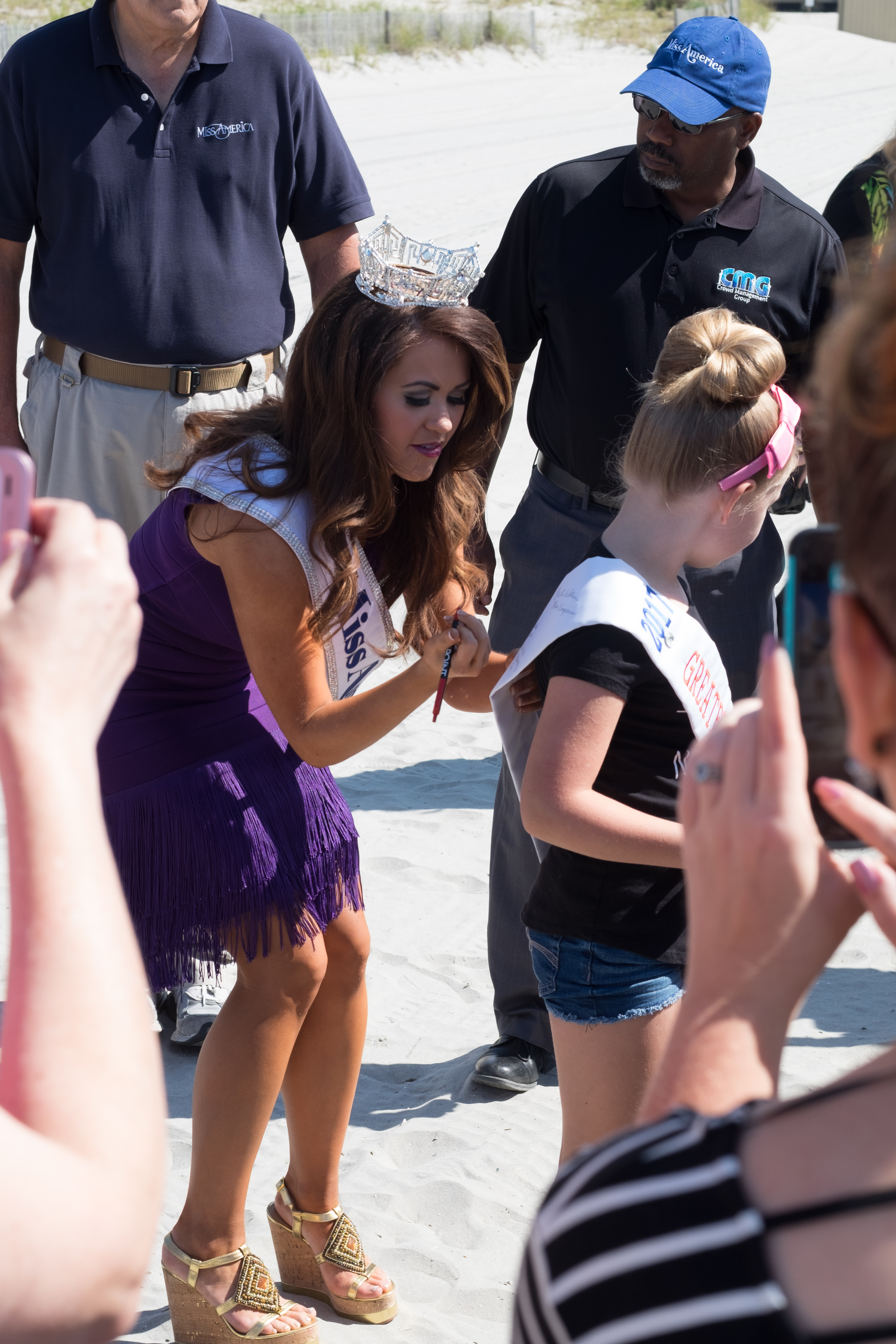
Mund in Atlantic City after being crowned Miss America 2018

She graduated with honors from Brown University in 2016 with a degree in business, entrepreneurship, and organizations. Her thesis was on the Miss America Organization. Mund served as the president of the sorority Kappa Delta. She has said that the school helped her "think on [her] feet."

In 2019, the North Dakota House of Representatives passed Resolution No. 3035 to honor Mund. She was also inducted into the North Dakota Bluebook's "Notable North Dakotans" and recognized as one of "Five Women Who Changed North Dakota's History." On March 11, 2021, the North Dakota State Museum debuted an exhibit featuring Mund.

Prior to being crowned Miss America, she expressed her plan to attend law school. In May 2022, Mund graduated from Harvard Law School cum laude where she was a teaching fellow, the Executive Editor of Operations for the Harvard Journal of Sports and Entertainment Law, a member of the Harvard Law School Mock Trial Association, and a member of the Women's Law Association. On September 23, 2022, Mund was sworn in and admitted to practice law in North Dakota.

== Pageantry ==
=== Early pageantry ===
She began pageantry as a child, capturing the titles of Little Miss North Dakota, Miss Pre-Teen North Dakota, and Miss Junior Teen North Dakota. Mund later competed in Miss North Dakota's Outstanding Teen 2010 as Miss Red River Valley's Outstanding Teen 2010. She went on to win the competition, and competed in Miss America's Outstanding Teen 2011. She later was the fourth runner-up at the Miss North Dakota Teen USA 2012 pageant.

=== Miss North Dakota ===
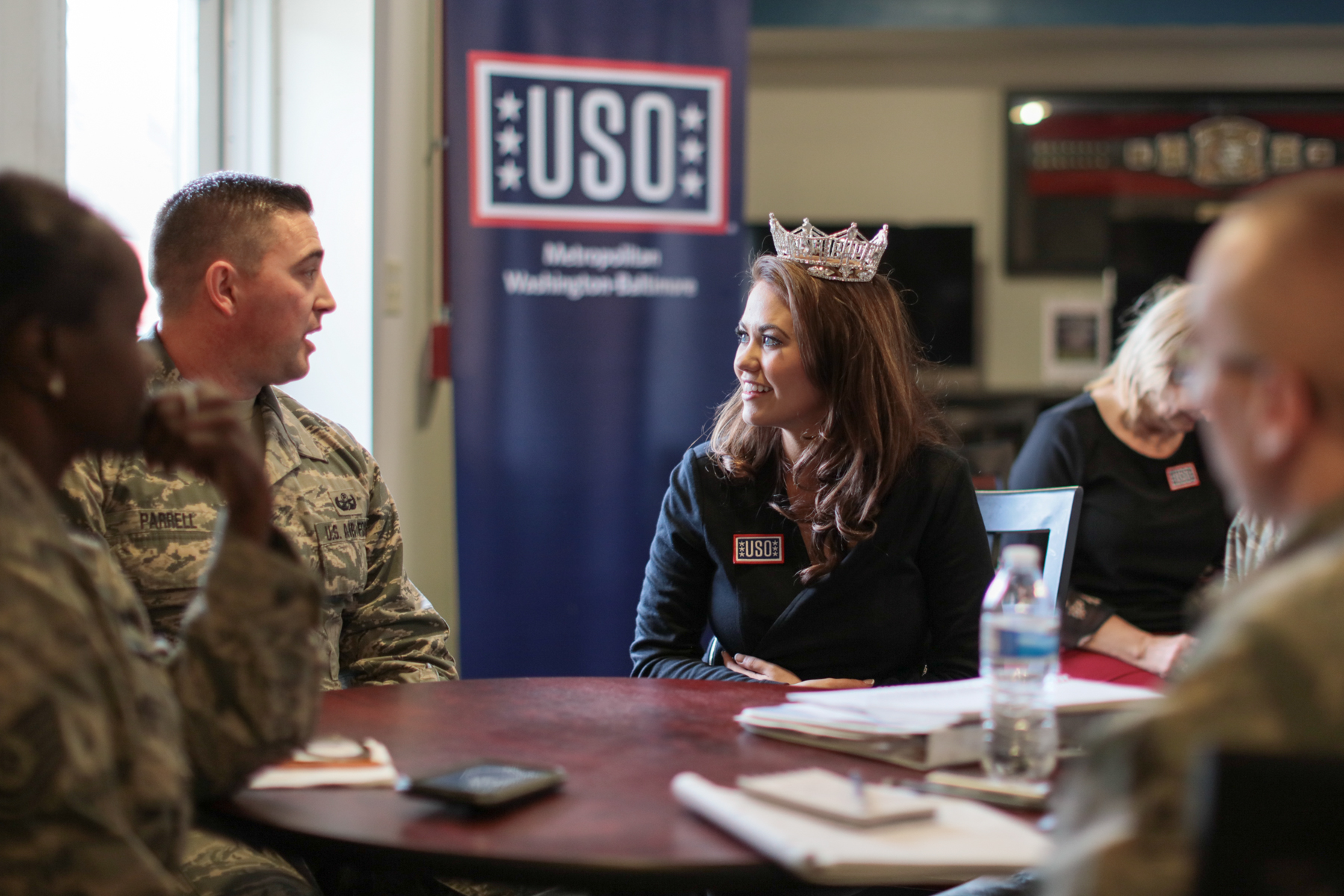
Mund's USO visits

Mund competed in Miss North Dakota 2016 as Miss Oil Country 2016, and was the first runner-up. She returned to the competition the following year as Miss Northern Lights 2017, and was crowned Miss North Dakota 2017, with her platform being "A Make-A-Wish Passion with Fashion."

=== Miss America 2018 ===
Mund represented North Dakota in the Miss America 2018 competition held at Boardwalk Hall in Atlantic City, New Jersey, in September 2017. Her platform was "A Make-A-Wish Passion with Fashion." In the preliminary competitions, Mund was named the first runner-up for the Quality of Life Award.

On September 10, 2017, Mund was crowned Miss America 2018 by Miss America 2017 Savvy Shields. Along with the title of Miss America, she received a $50,000 scholarship. Mund is the first contestant from North Dakota to win the Miss America title. She is also the last Miss America to compete in the swimsuit portion of competition.

During her reign, Mund served as the 2018 National Goodwill Ambassador for the Children's Miracle Network Hospitals and worked closely with the USO. In solidarity with the #MeToo movement, she wore black to the 2018 State of the Union, and in the March/April 2018 issue of the alumni magazine of her Ivy League school, she represented the Miss America organization, saying that it was the largest scholarship provider to women and that "it's more relevant than ever". She expressed an interest in its change from the inside positive towards its current trajectory, "the organization really did exactly what it was meant to do, and that was to empower women and give them the skills to be able to stand up for themselves."

In August 2018, Mund criticized the Miss America Organization in stating "My voice is not heard nor wanted by our current leadership, nor do they have any interest in knowing who I am and how my experiences relate to positioning the organization for the future." She further stated, "The rhetoric about empowering women, and openness and transparency, is great; however, the reality is quite different. I am living that difference. To stay silent is to give away my power and the power of the women who will follow me. I am not comfortable with any of us being controlled, manipulated, silenced, or bullied."

On December 8, 2019, Mund became the first and so far only Miss America to judge the Miss Universe competition.

== Politics ==
From August to December 2016, Mund interned for U.S. Senator John Hoeven, a Republican.

=== 2022 House of Representatives election ===
On August 6, 2022, Mund announced her candidacy as an independent to represent North Dakota in the U.S. House of Representatives. She cited the Dobbs v. Jackson Women's Health Organization decision as her motivation to enter the race.

Mark Haugen, the Democratic–NPL candidate, withdrew from the race following her candidacy and pressure from individuals like former representative Earl Pomeroy over his pro-life positions. The Dem-NPL would endorse Mund after his withdrawal.

Despite polls showing a close race, with one even putting Mund behind by only 4%, she lost the election to incumbent Republican Kelly Armstrong by a vote of 148,399 (62.2%) to 89,644 (37.6%).

=== 2024 House of Representatives election ===
On April 8, 2024, Mund filed paperwork and announced she would run in the NDGOP primary to replace Armstrong as he ran for governor. Mund campaigned as being a pro-choice, anti-Trump Republican candidate. She would face incumbent public service commissioner Julie Fedorchak, former state representative Rick Becker, farmer Alex Balazs, and activist Sharlet Mohr.

Mund participated in three of the four debates.

On June 11, 2024, Mund lost the primary. Coming in third of five candidates, she received 19%. Mund stated on the winning candidate Julie Fedorchak that "I do have concerns, too, during the last debate when she said there are post-birth abortions and just the misinformation on women's reproductive health care is really concerning."

On September 21, 2024, Mund was voted "Best ND Politician." She has stated she would not rule out running for office in the future.

== Legal career ==
As of 2024, Mund is an associate with Quinn Emanuel Urquhart & Sullivan, LLP where she practices in the areas of complex commercial litigation, including white-collar criminal defense, bankruptcy, and employment matters.

== Personal life ==
Mund is Catholic.

== Electoral history ==
2022 North Dakota's at-large congressional district election
Party	Candidate	Votes	%	±%
Republican	Kelly Armstrong (incumbent)	148,399	62.20%	–6.76
Independent	Cara Mund	89,644	37.57%	N/A
Write-in		543	0.23%	+0.12
Total votes		238,586	100.00%	
Republican hold				

2024 North Dakota's at-large congressional district Republican primary
Party	Candidate	Votes	%
Republican	Julie Fedorchak	43,137	45.9
Republican	Rick Becker	27,771	29.6
Republican	Cara Mund	18,343	19.5
Republican	Alex Balazs	3,758	4.0
Republican	Sharlet Mohr	795	0.8
Write-in		109	0.1
Total votes		93,913	100.0

Awards and achievements
Preceded by Savvy Shields	Miss America; 2018	Succeeded by Nia Franklin
Preceded by Macy Christianson	Miss North Dakota; 2017	Succeeded by Lizzie Jensen
Preceded by Becca Lebak	Miss North Dakota's Outstanding Teen; 2010	Succeeded by Kylie Helm
