= City Liquidators =

Furniture warehouse in Portland, Oregon, US

Coordinates: 45°31′0.8″N 122°39′47.9″W

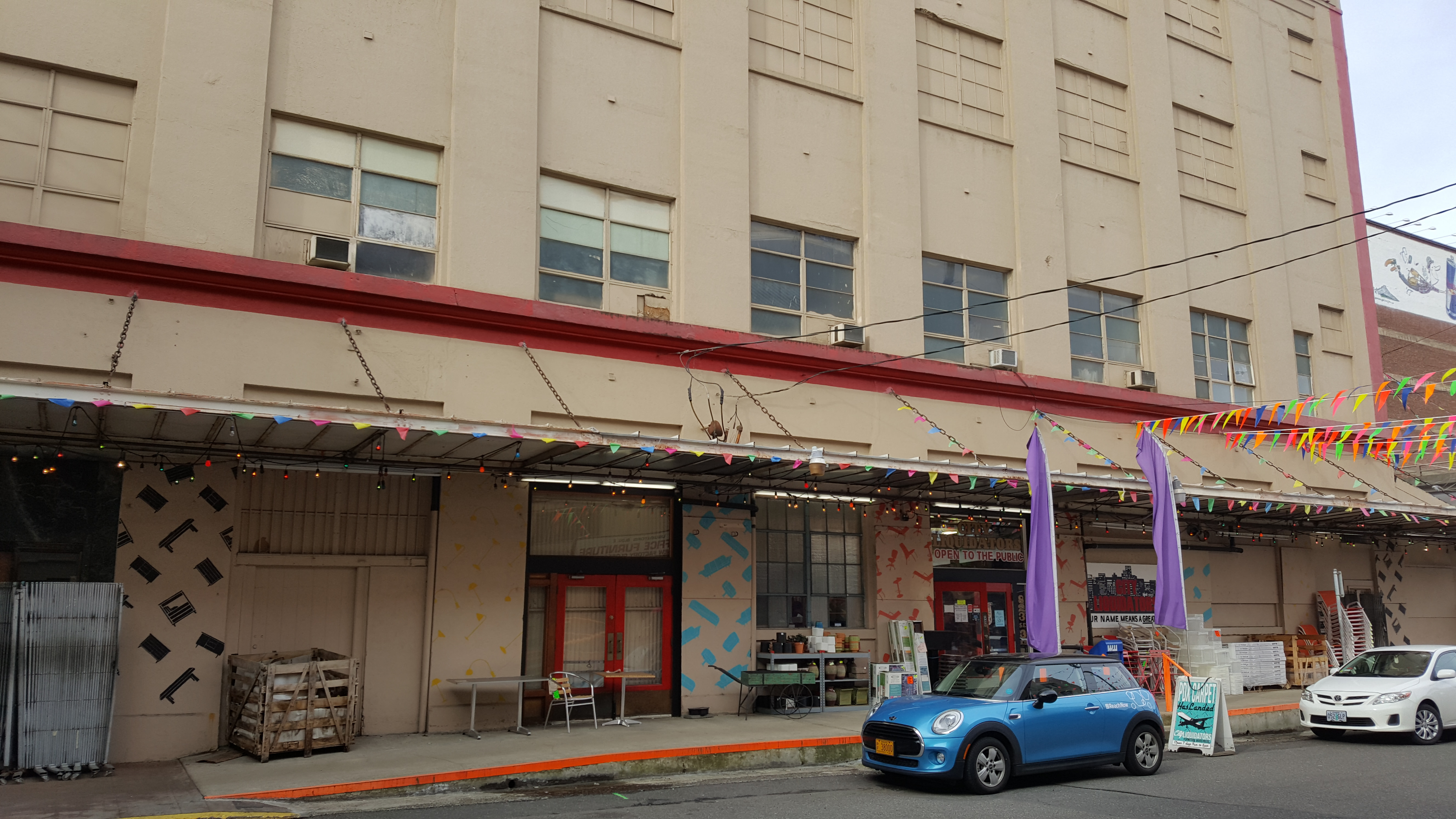
- Exterior view in 2017
- Founded: 1977; 49 years ago in Portland, Oregon, United States
- Founder: Walt Pelett
- Headquarters: 823 Southeast 3rd Avenue, Portland, Oregon, U.S.
- Owners: Walt Pelett; Pam Pelett
- Website: cityliquidators.com

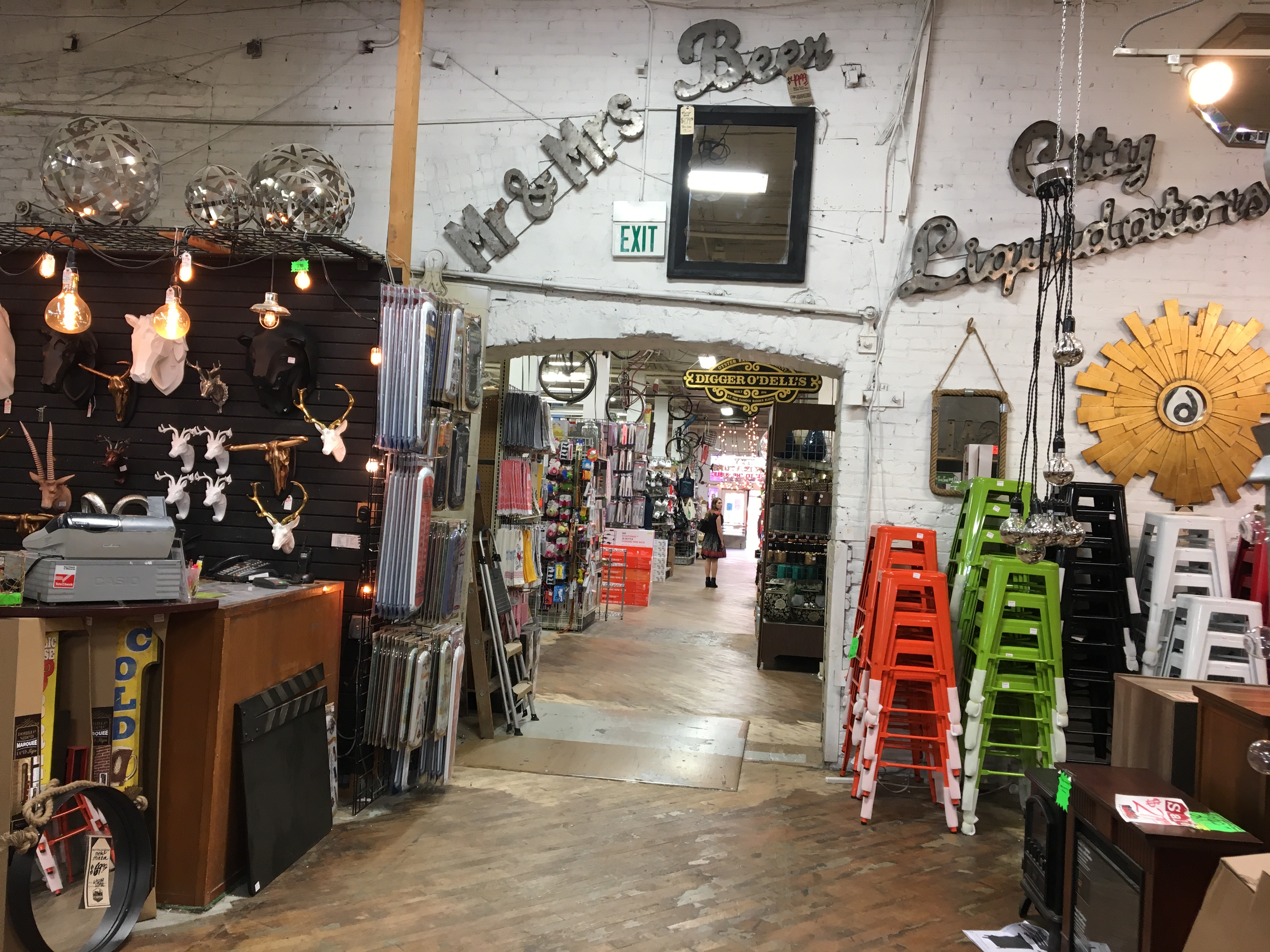
The store's interior, 2016

City Liquidators is a furniture warehouse in the Buckman neighborhood of Portland, Oregon. It was established in 1977 by Walt Pelett, who still owns the company along with his wife, Pam. The company occupies seven buildings totaling 390,000-square feet.

== Promotion ==
Walt and Pam's daughter, Emma Pelett, has appeared in ads for the company since she was six weeks old. She served as Miss Oregon USA in 2014, and competed in the Miss USA 2014 competition.

== Reception ==
The Portland Mercury has said the store "has everything from new and used office furniture to tableware to new home furnishing to weird cheap plastic stuff. You will be amazed." In an article about Portland's best shopping destinations, the paper said of City Liquidators: "Expect something weird, wonderful, and vast. It's great for furniture, Egyptian sarcophagi, Urkel dolls, office supplies, fabric, dishes, carpet, and so much more."

The store has been recognized by Willamette Week's 'Best of Portland' readers' poll multiple times. It received "honorable mention" in the "Best Furniture Store" category in 2015. In 2016, the company won in the "Best Home Goods Store" category, and placed second in the "Best Furniture" category. In 2017, City Liquidators placed third in the "Best Home Goods Store" category, and second in the "Best Furniture Store" category. It won in the Best Mattress / Furniture Store category in 2025.

City Liquidators has been included in published guides and walking tours of Portland.
