= Miss North Dakota's Teen =

- Formation: 1994
- Type: Beauty pageant
- Location: Williston, North Dakota
- Members: Miss America's Outstanding Teen
- Official language: English
- Key people: Stephanie Richter
- Website: Official website

The Miss North Dakota's Teen competition is the pageant that selects the representative for the U.S. state of North Dakota in the Miss America's Teen pageant.

Addison Pringle of Surrey was crowned Miss North Dakota's Teen on June 13, 2026, at the Bakken Auditorium in Williston, North Dakota. She competed for the title of Miss America's Teen 2027 on September 5, 2026, at the Kravis Center for the Performing Arts in West Palm Beach, Florida.

== Results summary ==
The year in parentheses indicates year of Miss America's Outstanding Teen competition the award/placement was garnered.

=== Placements ===
- Top 8: Abby Wolfe (2014)
- Top 12: Raghen Lucy (2015)

=== Awards ===
==== Preliminary awards ====
- Preliminary Evening Wear/On-Stage Question: Arianna Walker (2009)
- Preliminary Talent: Raghen Lucy (2015)
- Preliminary Fitness: Rita Johnson (2026)

==== Non-finalist awards ====
- Non-finalist Evening Wear/On-Stage Question: Arianna Walker (2009)
- Non-finalist Interview: Arianna Walker (2009)

==== Other awards ====
- America's Choice: Raghen Lucy (2015)
- Outstanding Instrumental Talent Award: Raghen Lucy (2015)
- Random Acts of Kindness Award: Micah Schlittenhardt (2019)
- Teens in Action Award Finalist: Lyndsey Scheurer (2017)

== Winners ==
- Declared as Winner
- Ended as a runner-up
- Ended as a finalist or semi-finalist

Year	Name	Hometown	Age	Local title	Talent	Placement at MAO Teen	Special scholarships at MAO Teen	Notes
2026	Addison Pringle	Surrey	16	Miss Minot's Teen	Lyrical Dance			
2025	Rita Johnson	Williston	18	Miss BisMan Power of 100's Teen	Lyrical Dance		Preliminary Fitness Award	
2024	Tayler Christanson	Burlington	18		Ballet, La Esmeralda			Sister of Miss North Dakota 2016 and Miss North Dakota USA 2020, Macy Christianson. Miss Magic City 2027.
2023	Ellie Ahlfeldt	Fargo		Miss Red River Valley Fair's Teen	Vocal			Miss Downtown Fargo 2027
2022	Olivia Rossland	Williston	17	Miss Bisman's Outstanding Teen	Dance			
2021	Emma Tong	Williston	18	Miss Summerfest's Outstanding Teen	Lyrical Dance, "Jealous"			Later Miss North Dakota 2026
2019-20	Kaylee Moss	Williston	15	Miss Williston's Outstanding Teen	Lyrical Dance, "Speechless"			
2018	Micah Schlittenhardt	Bismarck	16	Miss Northern Lights' Outstanding Teen	Ballet en Pointe, Don Quixote		Random Acts of Kindness Award	Later Distinguished Young Woman of North Dakota 2021
2017	Sydney Helgeson	Bismarck	16	Miss Bismarck's Outstanding Teen				Later Miss North Dakota 2023 (previously 1st runner-up in 2022 and 3rd runner-up in 2021)
2016	Lyndsey Scheurer	Bismarck	17		Vocal/Guitar		Teens in Action Award Finalist	
2015	Olivia Larson	LaMoure		Miss Bismarck's Outstanding Teen	Piano			
2014	Raghen Lucy	Williston		Miss Williston's Outstanding Teen	Piano	Top 12	America's Choice Outstanding Instrumental Talent Award Preliminary Talent Award	
2013	Abby Wolfe	Bismarck		Miss Bismarck's Outstanding Teen	Ballet en Pointe, "Grand Pas Classique"	Top 8		
2012	Kaylee Seven	Williston	15	Miss Oil Country's Outstanding Teen	Vocal, “I Can Hear the Bells” from Hairspray			
2011	Kylie Helm	Bismarck		Miss State Capital's Outstanding Teen	Dance			3rd runner-up at Miss North Dakota 2016 pageant
2010	Cara Mund	Bismarck	16	Miss Red River Valley's Outstanding Teen	Dance			Later Miss North Dakota 2017; Crowned Miss America 2018
2009	Becca Lebak	Bismarck		Miss Dakota Territory's Outstanding Teen				1st runner-up at Miss North Dakota 2012 pageant
2008	Arianna Walker	Bismarck	17	Miss Bismarck's Outstanding Teen	Contemporary Lyrical Dance		Non-finalist Evening Wear/OSQ Award Non-finalist Interview Award Preliminary Evening Wear/OSQ Award	Later Miss North Dakota Teen USA 2010 Later Miss North Dakota 2011
2007	Andrea Berglund	Bismarck	16	Teen Miss Northern Lights				
2006	Rachel Douts	Powers Lake			Vocal			
2005	Laura Peinovich	Fargo	17		Jazz Dance			
2004	Sarah Hatzenbuhler	Bismarck			Lyrical Dance, "The Rose"	No national pageant Was previously an independent pageant with the winner earning the title of, "Miss Teen North Dakota" Changed to current title after a national pageant was created by the Miss America Organization in 2005		
2003	Kylee Seil	Williston	17			No national pageant Was previously an independent pageant with the winner earning the title of, "Miss Teen North Dakota" Changed to current title after a national pageant was created by the Miss America Organization in 2005		
2002	Kimberly Beard	Williston				No national pageant Was previously an independent pageant with the winner earning the title of, "Miss Teen North Dakota" Changed to current title after a national pageant was created by the Miss America Organization in 2005		
2001	Marisa Field	Minot				No national pageant Was previously an independent pageant with the winner earning the title of, "Miss Teen North Dakota" Changed to current title after a national pageant was created by the Miss America Organization in 2005		Later Miss North Dakota Teen USA 2003; Top 10 at Miss Teen USA 2003 pageant
2000	Molly Prout	Grand Forks				No national pageant Was previously an independent pageant with the winner earning the title of, "Miss Teen North Dakota" Changed to current title after a national pageant was created by the Miss America Organization in 2005		
1999	Stacey Thomas	Bismarck	15		Jazz en Pointe	No national pageant Was previously an independent pageant with the winner earning the title of, "Miss Teen North Dakota" Changed to current title after a national pageant was created by the Miss America Organization in 2005		Later Miss North Dakota 2002
1998	Tina Domagala	Bismarck				No national pageant Was previously an independent pageant with the winner earning the title of, "Miss Teen North Dakota" Changed to current title after a national pageant was created by the Miss America Organization in 2005		4th runner-up at Miss North Dakota 2005 pageant 3rd runner-up at Miss North Dakota 2007 pageant
1997	Jessica Woodhams	Williston				No national pageant Was previously an independent pageant with the winner earning the title of, "Miss Teen North Dakota" Changed to current title after a national pageant was created by the Miss America Organization in 2005		
1996	Thea Ebel	Williston				No national pageant Was previously an independent pageant with the winner earning the title of, "Miss Teen North Dakota" Changed to current title after a national pageant was created by the Miss America Organization in 2005		
1995	Jenni Stromli	Grand Forks				No national pageant Was previously an independent pageant with the winner earning the title of, "Miss Teen North Dakota" Changed to current title after a national pageant was created by the Miss America Organization in 2005		
1994	Angela Huwe	Williston			Dance	No national pageant Was previously an independent pageant with the winner earning the title of, "Miss Teen North Dakota" Changed to current title after a national pageant was created by the Miss America Organization in 2005		3rd runner-up at Miss North Dakota 1995 pageant
