= Miss North Dakota USA =

Beauty pageant competition

- Formation: 1952
- Type: Beauty pageant
- Headquarters: Fargo
- Location: North Dakota
- Members: Miss USA
- Official language: English
- Key people: Kelly McCoy
- Website: Official website

The Miss North Dakota USA competition is the pageant that selects the representative for the state of North Dakota in the Miss USA pageant. Since 2010 to 2024, was directed by Future Productions based in Savage, Minnesota.

North Dakota's highest placements were in 2014 and 2021, when Audra Mari and Caitlyn Vogel, respectively, placed as the first runner-up. Both had formerly placed as the first runner-up in Miss Teen USA 2011 and Miss Teen USA 2019, respectively.

Four Miss North Dakota USA titleholders have competed at Miss America and eight have competed at Miss Teen USA.

Sophia Richards of Hope was crowned Miss North Dakota USA 2026 on May 30, 2026, at the Franklin Center in Des Moines. She will represent North Dakota at Miss USA 2026.

== Gallery of titleholders ==
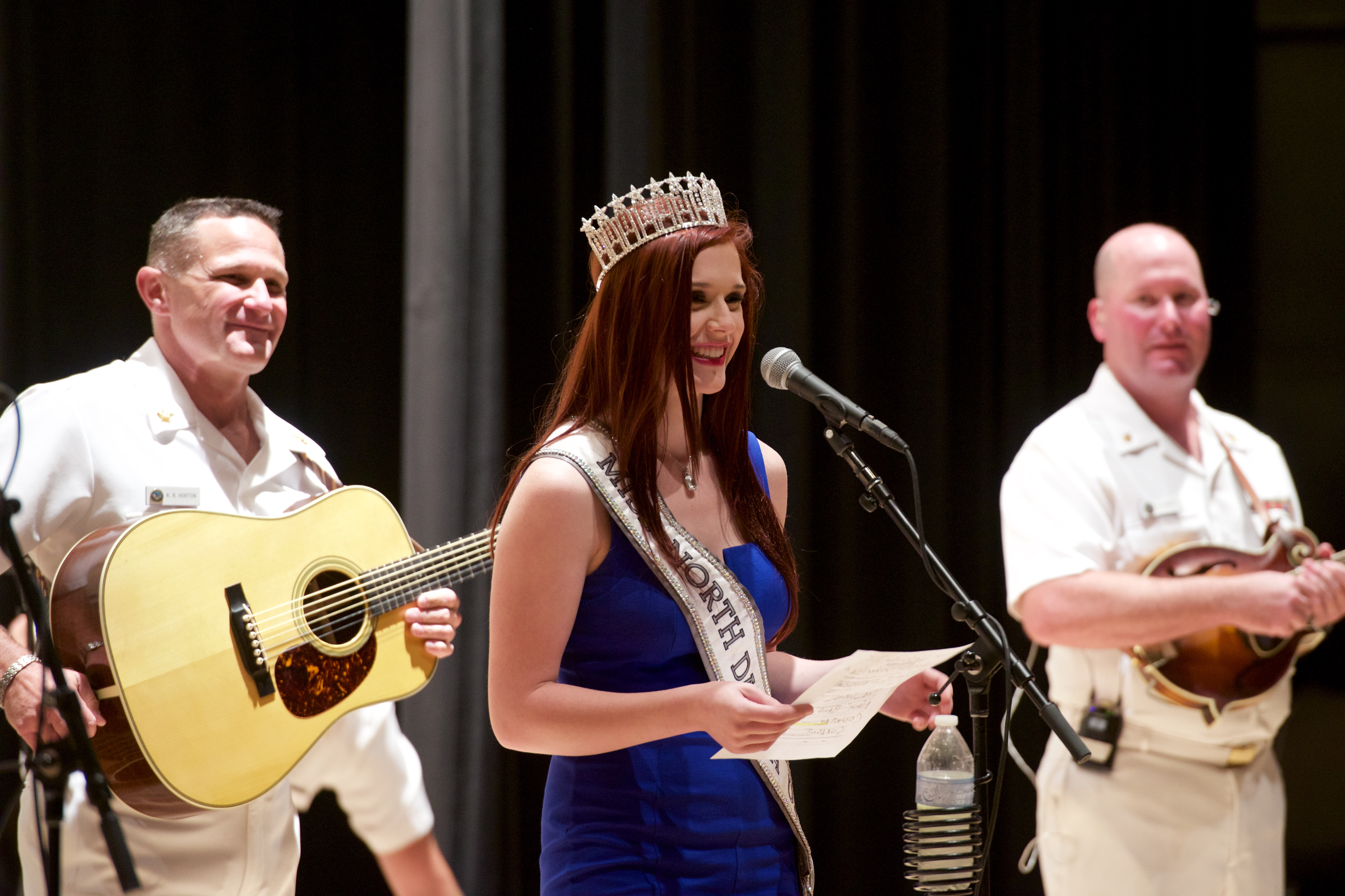
Molly Ketterling, Miss North Dakota USA 2015

== Results summary ==
- 1st runners-up: Audra Mari (2014), Caitlyn Vogel (2021)
- 3rd runner-up: Judy Slayton (1966)
- 4th runner-up: Elizabeth Jaeger (1983)
- Top 6: Juliette Spier (1996)

North Dakota holds a record of 5 placements at Miss USA.

== Winners ==
Color key

- Declared as Winner
- Ended as runner-up
- Ended as one of the finalists or semifinalists

Year	Name	Hometown	Age (Note: Age at the time of the Miss USA pageant)	Local title	Placement at Miss USA	Special awards at Miss USA	Notes
2026	Sophia Richards	Hope	25	Miss West Fargo			Previously Miss North Dakota 2024
2025	Olivia Redding	Burlington	21	Miss Burlington			Youngest sister of Miss North Dakota USA 2019 Samantha Redding; Younger cousin of Miss North Dakota USA 2018 Abigail Pogatshnik
2024	Codi Ann Miller	Amidon	31	Miss Western ND			Previously Miss North Dakota Teen USA 2009
2023	Monni Nyaribo	Grand Forks	27	Miss Badlands			
2022	SaNoah LaRocque	Belcourt	25	Miss Turtle Mountains			
2021	Caitlyn Vogel	Minot	21	Miss Minot	1st Runner-Up		Previously Miss North Dakota Teen USA 2019; 1st runner-up at Miss Teen USA 2019; She is the second woman to make 1st runner-up at both Miss Teen USA and Miss USA
2020	Macy Marie Christianson	Minot	23				Previously Miss North Dakota 2016; Longest reigning Miss North Dakota USA at 1 year, 7 months and 4 days
2019	Samantha Rae Redding	Burlington	22				Older first cousin of Abigail Pogatshnik, Miss North Dakota USA 2018; Shortest reigning Miss North Dakota USA at 10 months and 17 days; Older sister of Olivia Redding, Miss North Dakota USA 2025
2018	Abigail Pogatshnik	Bismarck	19				Youngest contestant competing for Miss USA 2018; Younger first cousin of Samantha Redding, Miss North Dakota USA 2019; First Native American Miss North Dakota USA (Turtle Mountain Band of Chippewa Indian); Older cousin of Olivia Redding, Miss North Dakota USA 2025
2017	Raquel Marie Wellentin	Fargo	24				Born in the Philippines
2016	Halley Lee Maas	Grand Forks	22				
2015	Molly Barbara Ketterling	Elgin	20				
2014	Audra Diane Mari	Fargo	19		1st Runner-Up		Previously Miss North Dakota Teen USA 2011; 1st runner-up at Miss Teen USA 2011; She is the first woman to make 1st runner-up at both Miss Teen USA and Miss USA; Later Miss World America 2016; Top 11 and "Continental Queen of America" at Miss World 2016
2013	Stephanie Fae Erickson	Fargo	23				Previously Miss North Dakota Teen International 2007.
2012	Jaci Stofferahn	Fargo	22				Firest runner-up at Miss North Dakota Teen International 2007; Contestant at National Sweetheart 2009.
2011	Brandi Lynn Schoenberg	Mohall	26				Previously Miss North Dakota International 2007.
2010	Taylor Ellen Kearns	Fargo	20				Previously Miss North Dakota Teen USA 2007.
2009	Kelsey Erickson	Grand Forks	22				
2008	Stephanie Lee Tollefson	New Rockford	21				Originally first runner-up, assumed the title when Bethany Nesheim resigned
2008	Bethany Nesheim	Jamestown	26		did not compete		Resingned on December 16, 2007, due to living in Milwaukee, Wisconsin: Second runner-up at Miss North Dakota International 2007
2007	Rachel Leigh Mathson	Thief River Falls	25				
2006	Kimberly Jean "Kim" Krueger	Fargo	21	Miss Red River Valley			
2005	Chrissa Miller	Bismarck	20	Miss Fargo			
2004	Jennifer Lynn Smith	Fargo	27	Miss Fargo			Contestant at National Sweetheart 1998.
2003	Samantha Mary Edwards	Fargo	23				Second runner-up at Miss North Dakota USA 2001; Found dead at her north-side Minneapolis, Minn. home on June 14, 2016, at age 37.
2002	Amy Beth Elkins	Riverdale	26				Cousin of Nicci Elkins, Miss North Dakota Teen USA 1991; First runner-up at Miss North Dakota USA 2001
2001	Michelle Guthmiller	Palermo	24				
2000	Amie Hoffner	Minot	24				
1999	Shayna Bank	Fargo	21				Third runner-up at Miss North Dakota Teen USA 1994; Competed at Miss North Dakota Teen USA 1995
1998	Alison Nesemeier	Casselton	24				Previously Miss North Dakota Teen USA 1994
1997	Lauri Marie Gapp	Fargo	25				
1996	Juliette Anne Spier	Fargo	20		Top 6		Previously Miss North Dakota Teen USA 1992; Sister of Jessica Spier, Miss North Dakota Teen USA 1995
1995	Jean Ann Stallmo	Fargo	23				
1994	Amy Jane Lantz	Fargo	24				Mother of Miss Minnesota Teen USA 2025 Maisie Adams
1993	Jennifer Seminary	Fargo	24				Previously Miss North Dakota Teen USA 1988
1992	Camie Lynn Fladeland	Fargo	21				
1991	Mischelle Laine Christensen	Fargo	20				Second runner-up at Miss Nortb Dakota USA 1990
1990	Kari Lee Larson	Fargo	24				Previously Miss North Dakota Teen USA 1984; Top 10 at Miss Teen USA 1984
1989	Carla Christofferson	Tolna					Previously placed fourth runner-up to Miss North Dakota 1987 and 1988, and won the swimsuit competition in 1987.
1988	Kate L. "Katie" Sevde	Minot	22				Third runner-up at Miss North Dakota USA 1985 and 1987; Participated in Miss North Dakota USA 1986
1987	Shelley Rae Gangness	Fargo	22				Second runner-up at Miss North Dakota USA 1985 and 1986
1986	Beth Ann Remmick	Minot					First runner-up at Miss North Dakota USA 1985
1985	Regina Christine Schatz	Linton	22				First runner-up at Miss North Dakota USA 1983 and 1984
1984	Suzanne Lewis	Fargo	21				Second runner-up at Miss North Dakota USA 1983
1983	Elizabeth Anne "Robi" Jaeger	Fargo	22		4th Runner-Up		Later Miss North Dakota 1985
1982	Tammy Martinson	Grand Forks	21				
1981	Laurie Ida Ann Saarinen	Jamestown	20				Later Miss Minnesota 1982
1980	Kimberlee "Kim" Thompson	Minot	22				
1979	Renae Hermanson	Crosby	17				
1978	Theresa J. Olson	Fargo	25				
1977	Barbara Redlin	Ellendale	24				
1976	Linda Faye Paulson	Bowman	22				Mother of Kirsten Norderhaug, Miss Wisconsin Teen USA 2010.
1975	Renae Saville	Braddock	22				
1974	Judith Lynn Waltz	Langdon	19				
1973	Barbara Lundeen	Minot	19				
1972	Gail Schmeichel	Minot	27				
1971	Joanne Lynn Engel	Minot	23				
1970	Nancy Jean Perry	Minot	20				
1969	Beckee Benz	Harvey	18				
1968	Jewel Christensen	Fargo	24				
1967	Jacqueline "Jackie" Linder	Fargo	26				
1966	Judy Ann Slayton	Fargo	26		3rd Runner-Up		3rd runner up at Miss American Beauty 1965, official preliminary to Miss International.
1965	Patricia Kay "Pat" Dodge	Fargo	22				
Did not compete between 1961—1964
1960	Twila Kathryn "Dolly" Fleckten	Drayton					
1959	Patricia Ann McGinley	Minot	18				
1958	Diana Spidahl	Grand Forks	18				
1957	Anne Marit Studness	Devils Lake	19				
1956	Mary Jane Harroun	Bismarck	19				
1955	Joan Roberta Smith	Bismarck	19				
1954	Priscella Jane Hewitt	Fargo	19				
1953	Marilyn Caufield	Jamestown	19				
1952	Gloria Jo Rowe	Fargo	26				
