= 2022 United States House of Representatives election in North Dakota =

2022 United States House of Representatives election in North Dakota's at-large district
- November 8, 2022
- Turnout: 42.11% ▼
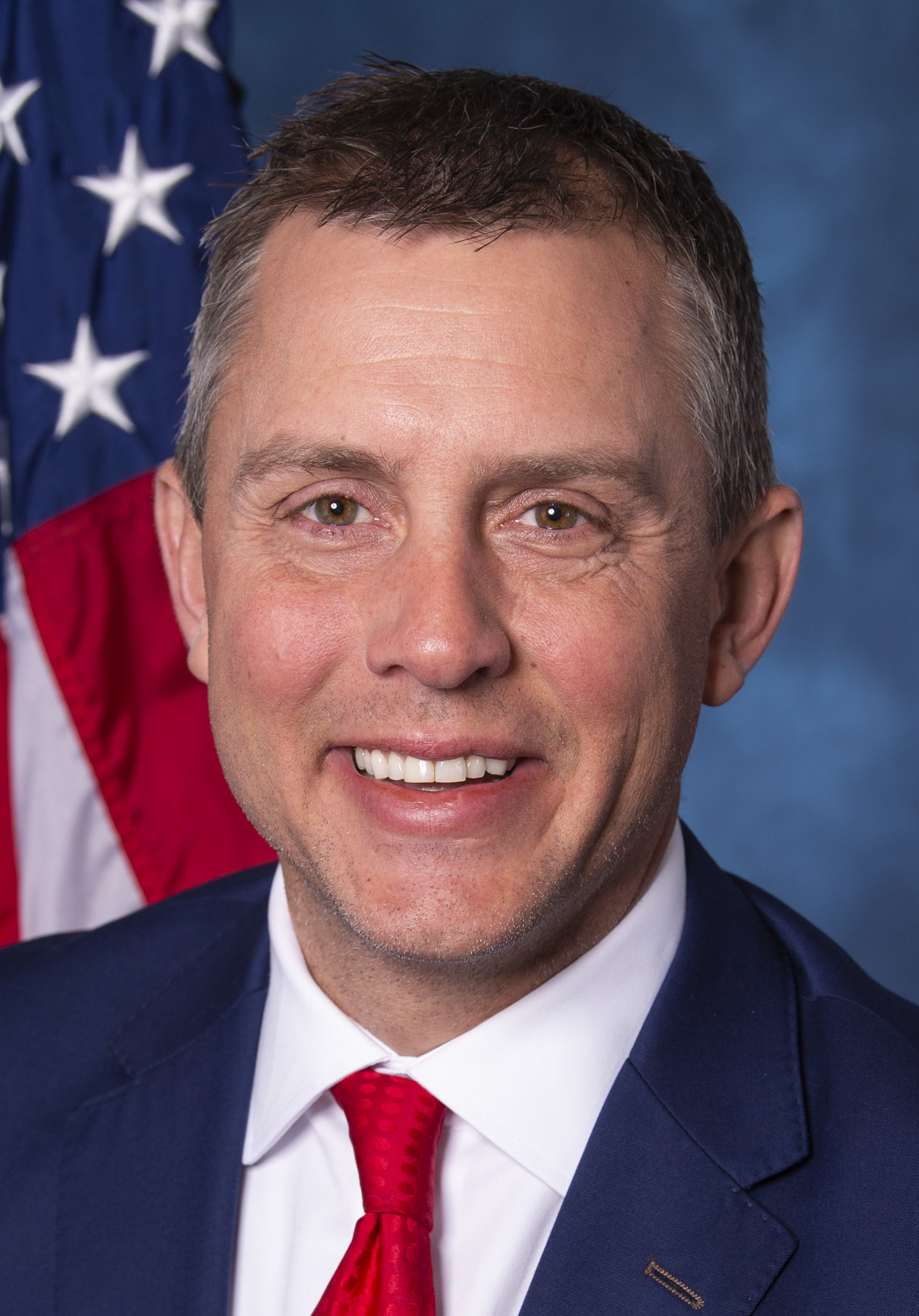

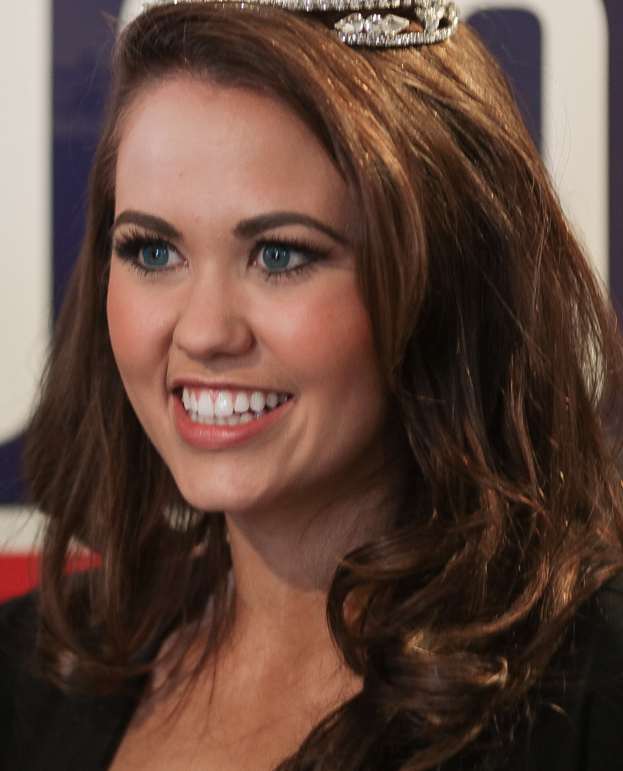
Nominee	Kelly Armstrong	Cara Mund
Party	Republican	Independent
Alliance		Democratic–NPL
Popular vote	148,399	89,644
Percentage	62.20%	37.57%
- Armstrong: 50–60% 60–70% 70–80% 80–90% Mund: 50–60% 60–70%
U.S. Representative before election
Kelly Armstrong
Republican
Elected U.S. Representative
Kelly Armstrong
Republican

The 2022 United States House of Representatives election in North Dakota was held on November 8, 2022, to elect the U.S. representative from North Dakota's at-large congressional district. The election coincided with other elections to the House of Representatives, elections to the United States Senate, and various state and local elections. Incumbent Republican Kelly Armstrong was re-elected with 69.0% of the vote in 2020. His only opponent in the general election was Independent Cara Mund after Democratic nominee Mark Haugen withdrew.

Although Armstrong won by a large margin, his 62.2% showing was his worst since his first election in 2018, and Mund's 37.6% was the best showing for a non-Republican in a North Dakota U.S. House race since 2014. Mund's vote share was at least 10% higher than every 2022 statewide Democratic–NPL candidate in North Dakota, and nearly 6% higher than incumbent president Democrat Joe Biden's vote share in the 2020 presidential election. Mund also had the second-best performance of any Independent in the 2022 congressional elections, only surpassed by Evan McMullin in the Utah Senate race.

== Republican primary ==
=== Candidates ===
==== Declared ====
- Kelly Armstrong, incumbent U.S. representative

=== Endorsements ===
Kelly Armstrong

Federal officials

- Donald Trump, former president of the United States

=== Results ===
Republican primary results
Party	Candidate	Votes	%
Republican	Kelly Armstrong (incumbent)	70,424	99.0
Write-in		709	1.0
Total votes		71,133	100.0

== Democratic primary ==
=== Candidates ===
==== Withdrew after winning primary ====
- Mark Haugen, student counselor and nominee for state treasurer in 2020

=== Endorsements ===
Mark Haugen

Organizations

- North Dakota Democratic–Nonpartisan League Party

=== Results ===
Democratic–NPL primary results
Party	Candidate	Votes	%
Democratic–NPL	Mark Haugen	21,897	99.7
Write-in		57	0.3
Total votes		21,954	100.0

=== Aftermath ===
Following the overturning of Roe v. Wade in June 2022, Haugen faced criticism among Democrats for his anti-abortion beliefs. Many within the Democratic–NPL Party preferred independent candidate Cara Mund, who is pro-choice, and urged Haugen to drop out of the race. Haugen ended his campaign in September, and the Democratic–NPL Party endorsed Mund shortly after.

== Independents ==
=== Declared ===
- Cara Mund, lawyer and former Miss America

== General election ==
=== Predictions ===
Source	Ranking	As of
The Cook Political Report	Solid R	October 5, 2021
Inside Elections	Solid R	October 11, 2021
Sabato's Crystal Ball	Safe R	October 5, 2021
Politico	Solid R	April 5, 2022
RCP	Safe R	June 9, 2022
Fox News	Solid R	July 11, 2022
DDHQ	Solid R	July 20, 2022
538	Solid R	June 30, 2022

=== Post-primary endorsements ===
Cara Mund (I)

Organizations

- North Dakota Democratic–Nonpartisan League Party

=== Polling ===
Poll source	Date(s) administered	Sample size (Note: Key: A – all adults RV – registered voters LV – likely voters V – unclear)	Margin of error	Kelly Armstrong (R)	Cara Mund (I)	Other	Undecided
DFM Research (D) (Note: This poll was sponsored by the North Dakota Democratic–NPL Party)	September 19–21, 2022	400 (LV)	± 4.9%	44%	40%	2%	14%
Axis Research (R) (Note: This poll was sponsored by Armstrong's campaign)	September 16–19, 2022	402 (LV)	± 5.0%	52%	30%	–	18%
1982 Polling (R)	September 10–12, 2022	518 (LV)	± 4.3%	48%	31%	–	13%
Odney (R)	August 18–28, 2022	403 (LV)	± 4.9%	49%	20%	15% (Note: Haugen (D) with 13%)	16%

=== Results ===
Senate district results

2022 North Dakota's at-large congressional district election
Party	Candidate	Votes	%	±%
Republican	Kelly Armstrong (incumbent)	148,399	62.20%	–6.76
Independent	Cara Mund	89,644	37.57%	N/A
Write-in		543	0.23%	+0.12
Total votes		238,586	100.00%	
Republican hold				

==== By county ====
County	Kelly Amrstrong Republican		Cara Mund Independent		Write-ins		Margin		Total votes
County	#	%	#	%	#	%	#	%	Total votes
Adams	690	74.9%	231	25.1%	0	0.0%	459	49.8%	921
Barnes	2,375	61.4%	1,484	38.4%	6	0.2%	891	23.0%	3,865
Benson	795	55.4%	638	44.4%	3	0.2%	158	11.0%	1,436
Billings	439	82.7%	92	17.3%	0	0.0%	347	65.4%	531
Bottineau	2,027	71.3%	808	28.4%	6	0.2%	1,219	42.9%	2,841
Bowman	1,074	79.3%	280	20.7%	1	0.1%	794	58.6%	1,355
Burke	614	79.2%	160	20.6%	1	0.1%	454	58.6%	775
Burleigh	21,915	62.1%	13,285	37.6%	109	0.3%	8,630	24.5%	35,309
Cass	26,107	48.8%	27,281	51.0%	151	0.3%	-1,174	-2.2%	53,539
Cavalier	1,117	72.4%	422	27.3%	4	0.3%	695	45.1%	1,543
Dickey	1,231	69.7%	535	30.3%	0	0.0%	696	39.4%	1,766
Divide	733	71.8%	287	28.1%	1	0.1%	446	43.7%	1,021
Dunn	1,301	78.9%	344	20.9%	3	0.2%	957	58.0%	1,648
Eddy	633	67.8%	299	32.0%	1	0.1%	334	35.8%	933
Emmons	1,212	79.9%	301	19.8%	4	0.3%	911	60.1%	1,517
Foster	896	72.3%	342	27.6%	1	0.1%	554	44.7%	1,239
Golden Valley	615	79.7%	155	20.1%	2	0.3%	460	59.6%	772
Grand Forks	10,560	56.4%	8,119	43.4%	45	0.2%	2,441	13.0%	18,724
Grant	871	78.9%	230	20.8%	3	0.3%	641	58.1%	1,104
Griggs	670	67.7%	318	32.1%	2	0.2%	352	35.6%	990
Hettinger	813	79.2%	213	20.7%	1	0.1%	600	48.5%	1,027
Kidder	768	72.6%	290	27.4%	0	0.0%	478	45.2%	1,058
LaMoure	1,139	69.8%	491	30.1%	1	0.1%	648	39.7%	1,631
Logan	639	77.8%	179	21.8%	3	0.4%	460	56.0%	821
McHenry	1,596	74.4%	546	25.4%	4	0.2%	1,050	49.0%	2,146
McIntosh	791	72.2%	304	27.8%	0	0.0%	487	44.4%	1,095
McKenzie	2,468	77.3%	721	22.6%	5	0.2%	1,747	54.7%	3,194
McLean	2,960	70.3%	1,236	29.4%	12	0.3%	1,724	40.9%	4,208
Mercer	2,710	75.8%	860	24.0%	7	0.2%	1,850	41.8%	3,577
Morton	7,385	65.3%	3,897	34.5%	22	0.2%	3,488	30.8%	11,304
Mountrail	1,702	65.7%	884	34.1%	5	0.2%	818	31.6%	2,591
Nelson	955	63.3%	553	36.6%	1	0.1%	402	26.7%	1,509
Oliver	654	78.9%	174	21.0%	1	0.1%	480	57.9%	829
Pembina	1,741	71.4%	697	28.6%	2	0.1%	1,044	42.8%	2,440
Pierce	997	67.3%	483	32.6%	1	0.1%	514	34.7%	1,481
Ramsey	2,598	65.1%	1,393	34.9%	0	0.0%	1,205	30.2%	3,991
Ransom	956	52.7%	853	47.0%	4	0.2%	103	5.7%	1,813
Renville	690	77.6%	198	22.3%	1	0.1%	492	55.3%	889
Richland	3,603	60.9%	2,313	39.1%	5	0.1%	1,290	21.8%	5,921
Rolette	1,133	42.9%	1,502	56.9%	6	0.2%	-369	-14.0%	2,641
Sargent	912	57.6%	671	42.4%	0	0.0%	241	15.2%	1,583
Sheridan	481	77.6%	137	22.1%	2	0.3%	344	55.5%	620
Sioux	196	34.3%	373	65.2%	3	0.5%	-177	-30.9%	572
Slope	252	83.2%	50	16.5%	1	0.3%	202	65.7%	303
Stark	7,106	78.0%	1,987	21.8%	19	0.2%	5,119	56.2%	9,112
Steele	457	58.3%	325	41.5%	2	0.3%	132	16.8%	784
Stutsman	4,281	64.2%	2,382	35.7%	9	0.1%	1,899	28.5%	6,672
Towner	558	65.6%	292	34.4%	0	0.0%	266	31.2%	850
Traill	1,749	59.4%	1,186	40.3%	10	0.3%	563	19.1%	2,945
Walsh	2,427	70.2%	1,026	29.7%	5	0.1%	1,401	40.5%	3,458
Ward	11,266	67.6%	5,355	32.1%	44	0.3%	5,911	35.5%	16,665
Wells	1,254	74.9%	412	24.6%	8	0.5%	842	50.3%	1,674
Williams	5,287	71.9%	2,050	27.9%	16	0.2%	3,237	44.0%	7,353
Totals	148,399	62.20%	89,644	37.57%	543	0.23%	139,435	24.63%	238,586

Counties that flipped from Republican to Independent

- Cass (largest city: Fargo)

Counties that flipped from Democratic to Independent

- Rolette (largest CDP: Belcourt)
- Sioux (largest CDP: Cannon Ball)

== See also ==
- 2022 North Dakota elections

== Notes ==
Partisan clients
