= Miss America 2018 =

91st edition of the Miss America competition

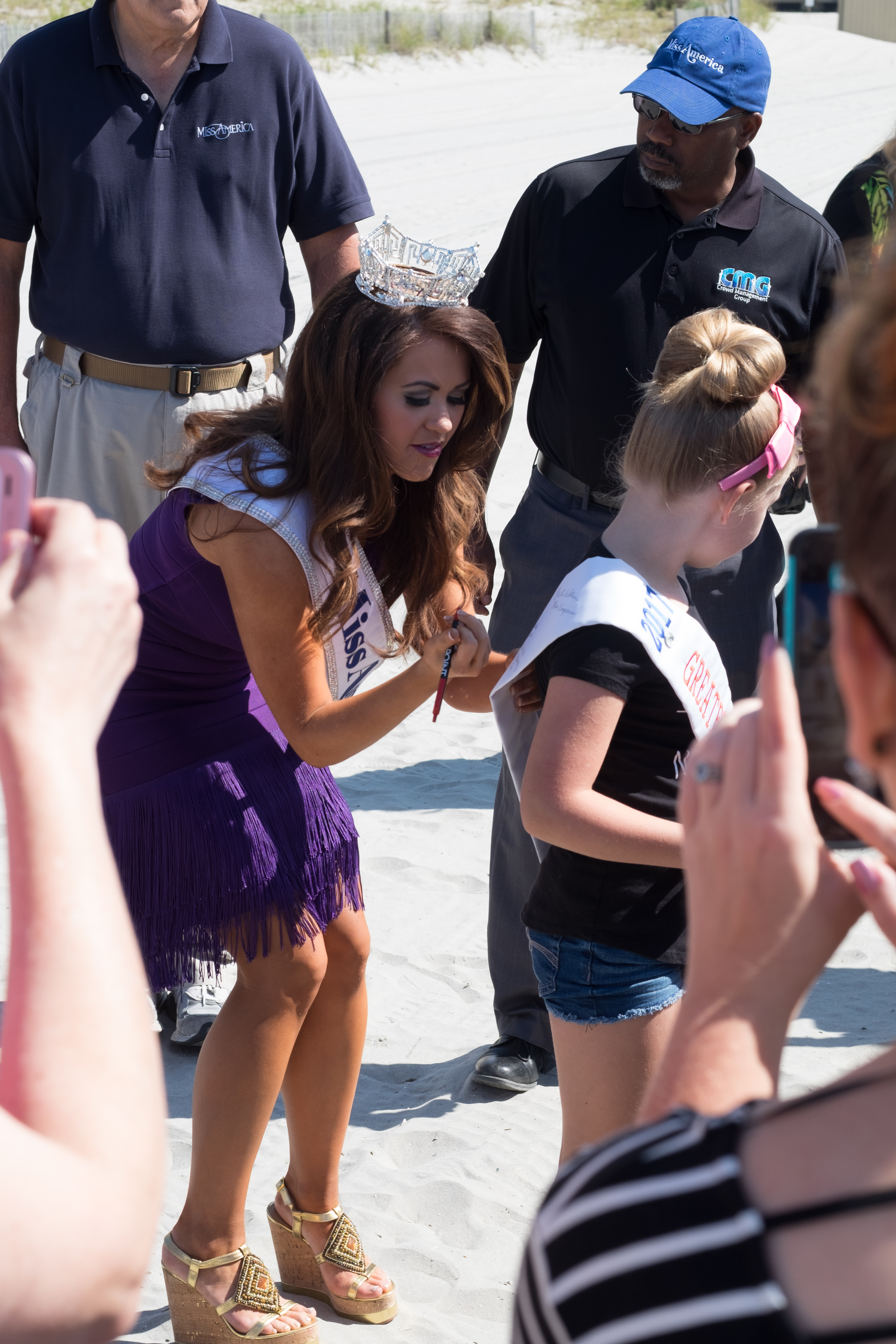
- Date: September 10, 2017
- Presenters: Chris Harrison; Sage Steele
- Venue: Boardwalk Hall, Atlantic City, New Jersey
- Broadcaster: ABC
- Entrants: 51
- Placements: 15
- Withdrawals: Puerto Rico
- Winner: Cara Mund; North Dakota

Miss America 2018, the 91st Miss America pageant, though the Miss America Organization celebrated its 97th anniversary in 2017. This discrepancy is due to no national pageants being held from 1928 to 1932 or in 1934 because of financial problems associated with the Great Depression. The 2018 pageant was held in Boardwalk Hall in Atlantic City, New Jersey on Sunday, September 10, 2017. This was the first Miss America pageant to be held in Atlantic City since the Miss America Organization headquarters relocated to Boardwalk Hall.

The event was broadcast by the American Broadcasting Company (ABC).

On July 24, 2017, it was announced that Chris Harrison and Sage Steele would be returning to co-host the Miss America pageant for the second year in a row.

Cara Mund of North Dakota became Miss America 2018 at the end of the event.

== Overview ==
=== Judges ===
==== Preliminary judges ====
From September 6–8, 2017, judges for the preliminary competition selected the winners of the preliminary talent and lifestyle and fitness competitions as well as the top 15 finalists for the final night of competition on September 10, 2017. The panel included entertainment lawyer, Carolyn Conrad; Global Government Affairs and Policy leader for Baker Hughes, Karen Knuston; CNN White House reporter, Kate Bennett; casting director, Patrick Rush; actor, Rusty Joiner; Miss America 1978, Susan Perkins Botsford; and dancer and actress, Vivian Nixon.

==== Final night judges ====
The panel of judges on the final night of competition on September 10, 2017, included country singer, Thomas Rhett; actress, author, and model, Molly Sims; Grammy-nominated singer and actress, Jordin Sparks; People Magazine's Editor in Chief, Jess Cagle; journalist, actress, and CEO of AfterBuzz TV, Maria Menounos; Miss America 2014, Nina Davuluri; and Olympic gold medalist, Tara Lipinski.

== Results ==
=== Placements ===
Placement	Contestant
Miss America 2018	North Dakota – Cara Mund
1st Runner-Up	Missouri – Jennifer Davis
2nd Runner-Up	New Jersey – Kaitlyn Schoeffel
3rd Runner-Up	District of Columbia – Briana Kinsey
4th Runner-Up	Texas – Margana Wood
Top 7	Alabama – Jessica Procter; Louisiana – Laryssa Bonacquisti
Top 10	Pennsylvania – Katie Schreckengast; South Carolina – Suzi Roberts; Virginia – Cecili Weber
Top 12	Georgia – Alyssa Beasley; Tennessee – Caty Davis
Top 15	Alaska – Angelina Klapperich; Illinois – Abby Foster §; New Mexico – Taylor Rey

§ America's Choice

=== Awards ===
==== Preliminary awards ====
Awards	Contestants
Lifestyle and Fitness	Florida - Sara Zeng; Louisiana - Laryssa Bonacquisti; Texas - Margana Wood
Talent	Louisiana - Laryssa Bonacquisti; Minnesota - Brianna Drevlow; Utah - JessiKate Riley

==== Quality of Life awards ====
Results	Contestant	Platform
Winner	Alabama - Jessica Procter	Step Up to the Plate: Decreasing Food Insecurity
1st runner-up	North Dakota - Cara Mund	A Make-A-Wish Passion with Fashion
2nd runner-up	South Carolina - Suzi Roberts	Children's Advocacy: Ensuring the Rights of Every Child
Finalists
Finalists	(Washington, D.C.) District of Columbia - Briana Kinsey	Daring to Defeat Diabetes
Finalists	Kansas - Krystian Fish	Remove the Labels: Be Unstoppable
Finalists	Minnesota - Brianna Drevlow	Brenna's Brigade: Juvenile Arthritis Awareness
Finalists	Mississippi - Anne Elizabeth Buys	Water for Life

==== Children's Miracle Network (CMN) National Miracle Maker awards ====
Results	Contestant
Winner	South Carolina - Suzi Roberts
1st runner-up	North Carolina - Victoria Huggins
2nd runner-up	Massachusetts - Jillian Zucco

==== STEM Scholarship awards ====
Results	Contestant
Winners	(Washington, D.C.) District of Columbia - Briana Kinsey; Kentucky - Molly Matney; Massachusetts - Jillian Zucco
Finalists
Finalists	Nebraska - Allison Tietjen; Nevada - Andrea Martinez

==== Women in Business Scholarship awards ====
Results	Contestant
Winners	Colorado - Meredith Winnefeld; Ohio - Sarah Clapper
Finalists	Maryland - Kathleen Masek; Wyoming - Cheyenne Buyert

==== Other awards ====
Awards	Contestant(s)
Miss Congeniality	Alaska - Angelina Klapperich
Dr. Marcia L. Leek Scholarship	New Hampshire - Lauren Percy
Non-finalist Talent Award	Colorado - Meredith Winnefeld; Iowa - Chelsea Dubczak; Minnesota - Brianna Drevlow; Utah - JessiKate Riley

== Contestants ==
State or district	Name	Hometown	Age	Talent	Placement	Special awards	Notes
Alabama	Jessica Procter	Tuscaloosa	21	Vocal, "Over the Rainbow"	Top 7	Quality of Life Award Winner	Previously Miss Alabama's Outstanding Teen 2013; 2nd runner-up at Miss America's Outstanding Teen 2014 pageant
Alaska	Angelina N. Klapperich	Wasilla	23	Piano, "Bumble Boogie"	Top 15	Miss Congeniality	Previously Miss Alaska's Outstanding Teen 2010 Contestant at National Sweetheart 2013 pageant
Arizona	MaddieRose Holler	Phoenix	19	Vocal, "I'd Give My Life For You"			Previously Miss Arizona's Outstanding Teen 2013
Arkansas	Maggie Benton	Jonesboro	22	Vocal, "The Music of the Night"			
California	Jillian Smith	Grass Valley	22	Piano, "Malagueña"			
Colorado	Meredith Winnefeld	Highlands Ranch	23	Dance Twirl, "He's a Pirate"		Non-finalist Talent Award Women in Business Scholarship Winner	Blind in right eye since birth Previously Miss Colorado's Outstanding Teen 2011 Former featured twirler at Arizona State University
Connecticut	Eliza Lynne Kanner	Hamden	21	Operatic Vocal, "Memory" from Cats			
Delaware	Chelsea Bruce	Manasquan, New Jersey	21	Dance			Eligible as a student at the University of Delaware
District of Columbia	Briana Kinsey	Birmingham, Alabama	24	Pop Vocal, "Born for This"	3rd runner-up	Quality of Life Award Finalist STEM Scholarship Winner	
Florida	Sara Zeng	Palm Coast	22	Classical Piano, "Fantaisie-Impromptu" in C Sharp minor by Frédéric Chopin		Preliminary Lifestyle & Fitness Award	
Georgia	Alyssa Beasley	Brunswick	19	Lyrical Dance, "When Your Feet Don't Touch the Ground"	Top 12		Later Miss Georgia USA 2020 and Top 16 Miss USA 2020
Hawaii	Kathryn Teruya	Honolulu	21	Jazz Dance, "I Want to be a Rockette"			Sister of Miss Hawaii Teen USA 2017, Lauren Teruya Previously Miss Hawaii Teen USA 2012; Winner of the Miss Teen USA Fan Vote, earning her a spot in the Top 16
Idaho	Taylor Lance	Boise	23	Vocal, "So Small" by Carrie Underwood			
Illinois	Abby Foster	Danville	21	Jazz Dance to Grease medley	Top 15	America's Choice	Currently an NFL cheerleader for the Indianapolis Colts
Indiana	Haley Begay	Pittsboro	19	Vocal, "Hallelujah"			
Iowa	Chelsea Dubczak	Holmen, Wisconsin	23	Operatic Vocal, "Sempre Libera" from La traviata		Non-finalist Talent Award	
Kansas	Krystian Fish	Wichita	21	Vocal, "They Just Keep Moving the Line" from Smash		Quality of Life Award Finalist	
Kentucky	Molly Matney	Center	20	Vocal, "He Taught Me to Yodel"		STEM Scholarship Winner	
Louisiana	Laryssa Bonacquisti	Monroe	22	Ventriloquism, "I Wanna Be a Cowboy Sweetheart"	Top 7	Preliminary Lifestyle & Fitness Award Preliminary Talent Award	Daughter of Miss New Jersey 1990, Lynette Falls Bonacquisti
Maine	Katie Elliott	Scarborough	22	Vocal, "Someone to Watch Over Me"			Previously Miss Maine's Outstanding Teen 2012
Maryland	Kathleen Masek	Westminster	22	Theatrical Dance		Women in Business Scholarship Finalist	
Massachusetts	Jillian Zucco	Mattapoisett	24	Vocal, "The Impossible Dream"		CMN Miracle Maker Award 2nd runner-up STEM Scholarship Winner	Top 10 at National Sweetheart 2015 pageant
Michigan	Heather Kendrick	Marysville	23	Violin, "Bad Romance" by Lady Gaga			Appeared on America's Got Talent with electro-pop violin group, Nuclassica
Minnesota	Brianna Drevlow	Thief River Falls	23	Classical Piano, Rhapsody in Blue		Non-finalist Talent Award Preliminary Talent Award Quality of Life Award Finalist	
Mississippi	Anne Elizabeth Buys	Vicksburg	21	Ballet en Pointe, "Viva!"		Quality of Life Award Finalist	Previously Miss Mississippi's Outstanding Teen 2013
Missouri	Jennifer Davis	Saint Charles	23	Bollywood Dance, "Naacho Re"	1st runner-up		Published author of children's book, Diversity Matters
Montana	Maddie Murray	Corvallis	18	Vocal, "God Help the Outcasts"			
Nebraska	Allison Tietjen	Chester	21	Piano, "The Phantom of the Opera"		STEM Scholarship Finalist	
Nevada	Andrea Martinez	Las Vegas	23	Vocal, "His Eye in on the Sparrow"		STEM Scholarship Finalist	
New Hampshire	Lauren Percy	Bow	23	Broadway Jazz Dance, "Another Day in the Sun" from La La Land		Dr. Marcia L. Leek Scholarship	Previously Miss New Hampshire's Outstanding Teen 2011
New Jersey	Kaitlyn Schoeffel	Egg Harbor Township	24	Dance, "Shut Up and Dance" by Walk the Moon	2nd runner-up		Previously Miss New Jersey's Outstanding Teen 2007
New Mexico	Taylor Rey	Las Cruces	22	Vocal, "Art Is Calling for Me"	Top 15		
New York	Gabrielle Walter	Clarence	24	Broadway Vocal, "You'll Never Walk Alone" from Carousel			Current student at the University of Buffalo School of Law
North Carolina	Victoria Huggins	St. Pauls	23	Vocal, "I Will Always Love You"		CMN Miracle Maker Award 1st runner-up	Former contestant on Star Search and American Idol Season 10 Top 15 at National Sweetheart 2015 pageant
North Dakota	Cara Mund	Bismarck	23	Jazz Dance, "The Way You Make Me Feel"	Miss America 2018	Quality of Life Award 1st runner-up	Previously Miss North Dakota's Outstanding Teen 2010 Accepted to law school at Notre Dame University
Ohio	Sarah Clapper	Louisville	23	Piano, "White Water Chopped Sticks"		Charles and Theresa Brown Scholarship Women in Business Scholarship Winner	
Oklahoma	Triana Browne	Oklahoma City	24	Vocal, "Summertime"			Later Miss Oklahoma USA 2019; 2nd runner-up at Miss USA 2019 pageant
Oregon	Harley Emery	Springfield	20	Classical Piano, "Moonlight Escapade"			Previously Miss Oregon's Outstanding Teen 2013
Pennsylvania	Katie Schreckengast	Palmyra	21	Alto Saxophone, "Listen" from Dreamgirls	Top 10		Previously Miss Pennsylvania's Outstanding Teen 2013
Rhode Island	Nicolette Peloquin	Newport	21	Acrobatics, "All That Jazz"			
South Carolina	Suzi Roberts	Pawleys Island	24	Lyrical Dance, "Heaven Is a Place on Earth" by Katie Thompson	Top 10	CMN Miracle Maker Award Winner Quality of Life Award 2nd runner-up	Former NFL cheerleader for the Atlanta Falcons Enrolled at the University of South Carolina School of Law
South Dakota	Miranda Mack	Redfield	21	Operatic Vocal, "Habanera" from Carmen			
Tennessee	Caty Davis	Knoxville	22	Vocal, "I Have Nothing"	Top 12		
Texas	Margana Wood	Houston	22	Contemporary Dance, "When We Were Young" by Adele	4th runner-up	Preliminary Lifestyle & Fitness Award	Previously Miss Texas' Outstanding Teen 2012
Utah	JessiKate Riley	Beaver	20	Classical Violin, "Praeludium and Allegro" by Fritz Kreisler		Non-finalist Talent Award Preliminary Talent Award	Previously Miss Utah's Outstanding Teen 2014 Later Miss Utah USA 2021 and Top 16 Miss USA 2021
Vermont	Erin Connor	Bridport	22	American Sign Language, "The Greatest Love of All"			Previously Miss Vermont's Outstanding Teen 2010 Obtained pilot's license at age 16 and piloted plane to Atlantic City for Miss America pageant
Virginia	Cecili Weber	Roanoke	22	Contemporary Jazz Dance, "Last Dance"	Top 10		Previously Miss Ohio's Outstanding Teen 2010
Washington	Nicole Renard	Kennewick	22	Jazz Dance, "I Love Me" by Meghan Trainor			Previously Miss Washington's Outstanding Teen 2011 Previously crowned Distinguished Young Woman of America 2013
West Virginia	Tamia Hardy	Martinsburg	22	Hip Hop Dance, "Burnitup!" by Janet Jackson			First African American woman crowned Miss West Virginia
Wisconsin	McKenna Holly Collins	Waunakee	21	Ballet en Pointe, "Habanera" from Carmen			Previously a company member at the Madison Ballet
Wyoming	Cheyenne Buyert	Sheridan	19	Vocal, "Puttin' on the Ritz"		Women in Business Scholarship Finalist	
