= Miss USA 2014 =

63rd Miss USA pageant

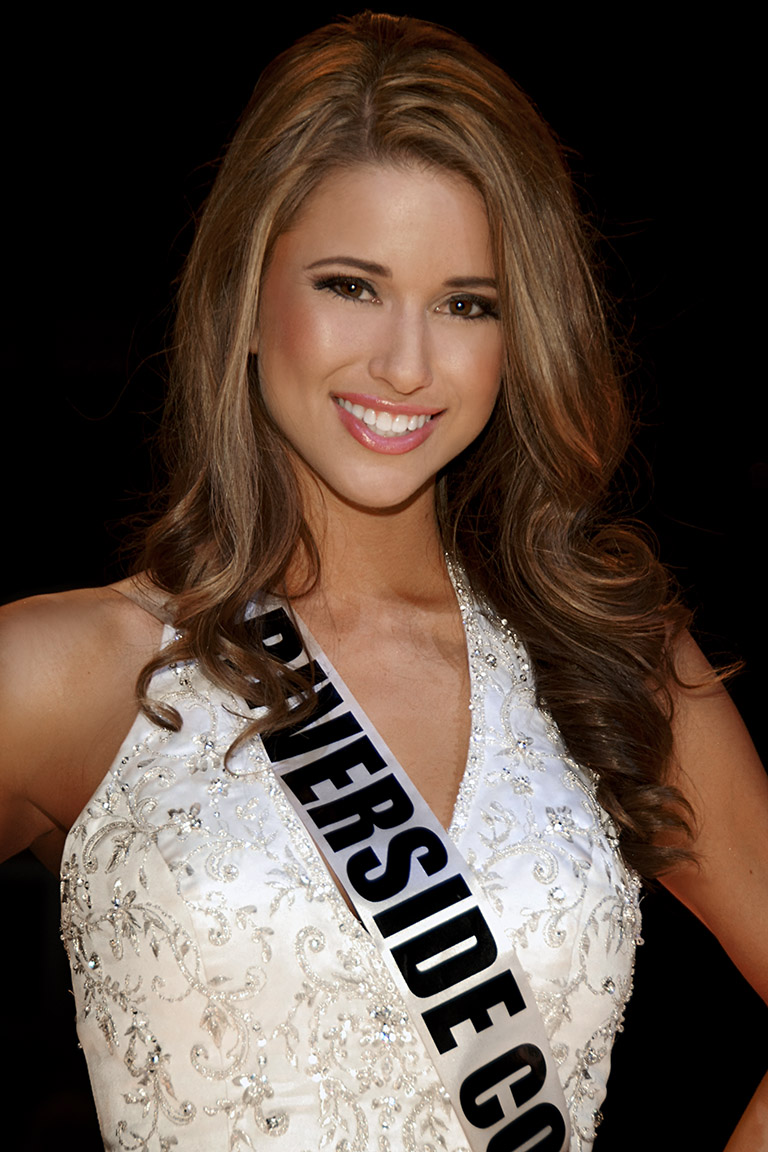
- Nia Sanchez, Miss USA 2014
- Date: June 8, 2014
- Presenters: Giuliana Rancic; Thomas Roberts; Jeannie Mai
- Entertainment: Florida Georgia Line; Nelly; Camila; Marc Broussard; Dirty Dozen Brass Band
- Venue: Baton Rouge River Center Arena, Baton Rouge, Louisiana
- Broadcaster: NBC (KTAL-DT); Telemundo
- Entrants: 51
- Placements: 20
- Winner: Nia Sanchez; Nevada
- Congeniality: Christina Palavra (Rhode Island)
- Photogenic: Cassandra Kunze (California)

Miss USA 2014 was the 63rd Miss USA pageant, held at the Baton Rouge River Center Arena in Baton Rouge, Louisiana on June 8, 2014. All fifty states and the District of Columbia competed. The preliminary competition was not webcast live for the first time in five years, but excerpts were distributed post-competition via website Hulu. The final night of competition was televised on NBC.

Erin Brady of Connecticut, crowned her successor Nia Sanchez of Nevada. This was Nevada's first Miss USA title. Sanchez represented the United States on home soil at Miss Universe 2014 and finished 1st Runner-Up.

The date and venue was revealed by Donald Trump, co-owner of the Miss Universe Organization, and Brady on March 13, 2014, during Today. However, it was reported that the delegates will be staying at the L'Auberge Casino and Hotel in Baton Rouge ahead of this announcement.

For the first time, the final telecast was three hours long, with the additional hour including a look at the top 20 (rather than 15) in their home states. The top 20 competed in swimsuits, then eliminated by the judges to a top ten. The top ten competed in evening gown, then judges eliminated to a final five, along with a sixth finalist selected from the remaining contestants in the top ten via a Twitter fan vote (texting #SAVETHEQUEEN).

This was the last Miss USA to be aired on NBC.

== Results ==
=== Placements ===
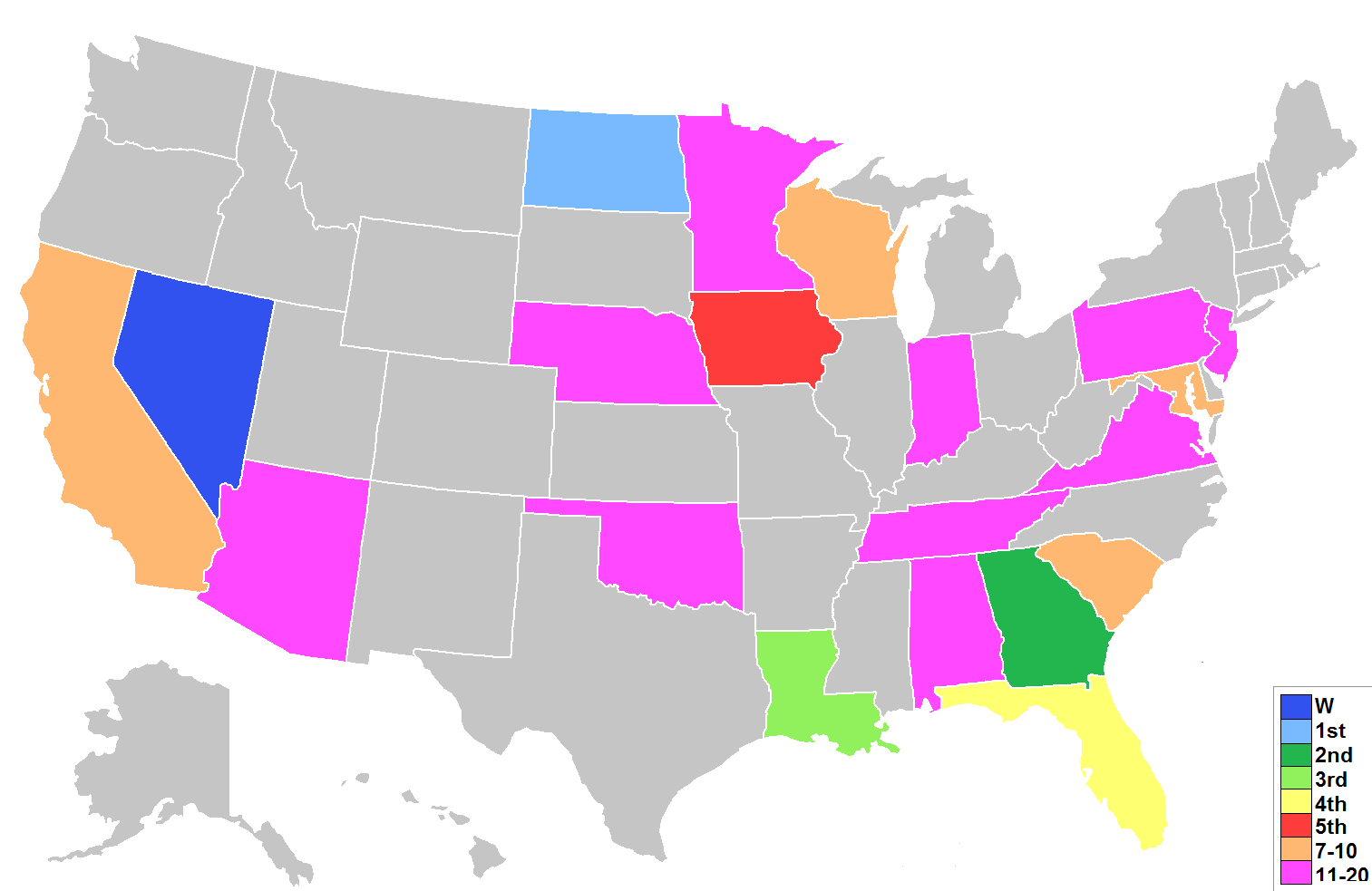
The state map results of Miss USA 2014, colors shaded in each state

Placement	Contestant
Miss USA 2014	Nevada – Nia Sanchez
1st Runner-Up	North Dakota – Audra Mari
2nd Runner-Up	Georgia – Tiana Griggs
3rd Runner-Up	Louisiana – Brittany Guidry
4th Runner-Up	Florida – Brittany Oldehoff
5th Runner-Up	Iowa – Carlyn Bradarich §
Top 10	California – Cassandra Kunze; Maryland – Taylor Burton; South Carolina – Christina Zapolski; Wisconsin – Bishara Dorre
Top 20	Alabama – Jesica Ahlberg; Arizona – Jordan Wessel; Indiana – Mekayla Diehl; Minnesota – Haley O'Brien; Nebraska – Amanda Soltero; New Jersey – Emily Shah; Oklahoma – Brooklynne Young; Pennsylvania – Valerie Gatto; Tennessee – Kristy Niedenfuer; Virginia – Arielle Rosmarino

§ Voted into Top 6 after the evening gown competition via Twitter

=== Special awards ===
Award	Contestant
Miss Congeniality	Rhode Island – Christina Palavra
Miss Photogenic	California – Cassandra Kunze

== Contestants ==
51 contestants were confirmed. The information from Miss USA Official website

State/district	Contestant	Hometown	Age (Note: Ages at the time of the pageant)	Height	Placement	Notes
Alabama	Jesica Warren Ahlberg	Birmingham	24	5 ft 6 in (1.68 m)	Top 20	
Alaska	Kendall Bautista	Eagle River	21	5 ft 7 in (1.70 m)		Later Miss Alaska 2016
Arizona	Jordan Wessel	Phoenix	20	5 ft 9 in (1.75 m)	Top 20	
Arkansas	Helen Wisner	Fayetteville	25	5 ft 8 in (1.73 m)		
California	Cassandra Kunze	San Diego	20	5 ft 9 in (1.75 m)	Top 10	Miss Photogenic
Colorado	Eleanna Livaditis	Centennial	25	5 ft 7 in (1.70 m)		
Connecticut	Desirée Pérez	Stamford	26	5 ft 7 in (1.70 m)		
Delaware	Kelsey Miller	Wilmington	23	5 ft 10 in (1.78 m)		Previously Miss Delaware Teen USA 2009
District of Columbia	Ciera Nicole Butts	Washington, D.C.	23	5 ft 7 in (1.70 m)		Winner of Last Squad Standing
Florida	Brittany Oldehoff	Fort Lauderdale	25	5 ft 11 in (1.80 m)	4th Runner-Up	Model season 7 of Project Runway; Contestant on The Amazing Race 28 with her teammate Jessica Versteeg
Georgia	Tiana Griggs	Monticello	27	5 ft 9 in (1.75 m)	2nd Runner Up	
Hawaii	Moani Hara	Honolulu	24	5 ft 7 in (1.70 m)		Previously Miss Hawaii's Outstanding Teen 2007
Idaho	Yvette Bennett	Boise	23	5 ft 6 in (1.68 m)		
Illinois	Lexi Atkins	Champaign	21	5 ft 8 in (1.73 m)		Previously Miss Illinois Teen USA 2010
Indiana	Mekayla Diehl	Bristol	25	5 ft 8 in (1.73 m)	Top 20	Later Mrs. America 2018
Iowa	Carlyn Bradarich	Iowa City	23	5 ft 10 in (1.78 m)	5th Runner-Up	Sister of Ashlyn Bradarich, Miss Illinois USA 2010; Later Miss Illinois World 2015
Kansas	Audrey Banach	Kansas City	22	5 ft 10 in (1.78 m)		
Kentucky	Destin Kincer	Whitesburg	21	5 ft 11 in (1.80 m)		
Louisiana	Brittany Guidry	Houma	21	5 ft 9 in (1.75 m)	3rd Runner-Up	Previously Miss Louisiana Teen USA 2009
Maine	Samantha Dahlborg	Gorham	20	5 ft 8 in (1.73 m)		
Maryland	Taylor Burton	La Plata	25	5 ft 10 in (1.78 m)	Top 10	
Massachusetts	Caroline Lunny	Holliston	23	5 ft 10 in (1.78 m)		Previously Miss Massachusetts Teen USA 2008; Contestant on season 22 of The Bachelor (US); Contestant of season 5 of Bachelor in Paradise (US); Contestatnt of season 2 of Bachelor in Paradise Australia
Michigan	Elizabeth Ivezaj	Macomb	24	5 ft 7 in (1.70 m)		
Minnesota	Haley O'Brien	Excelsior	21	5 ft 8 in (1.73 m)	Top 20	Previously Miss Minnesota Teen USA 2010
Mississippi	Chelsea Reardon	Southaven	23	5 ft 8 in (1.73 m)		
Missouri	Erica Sturdefant	Springfield	23	5 ft 9 in (1.75 m)		Previously Miss Missouri Teen USA 2010
Montana	Kadie Latimer	Kalispell	23	5 ft 10 in (1.78 m)		
Nebraska	Amanda Soltero	Columbus	22	5 ft 7 in (1.70 m)	Top 20	Previously Miss Nebraska Teen USA 2010
Nevada	Nia Sanchez	Las Vegas	24	5 ft 7 in (1.70 m)	Miss USA 2014	
New Hampshire	Bridget Brunet	South Hampton	26	5 ft 6 in (1.68 m)		
New Jersey	Emily Shah	Edison	19	5 ft 8 in (1.73 m)	Top 20	
New Mexico	Kamryn Blackwood	Farmington	22	5 ft 9 in (1.75 m)		
New York	Candace Kendall	Rochester	25	5 ft 8 in (1.73 m)		Previously Miss New York Teen USA 2006
North Carolina	Olivia Olvera	Fayetteville	26	5 ft 4 in (1.63 m)		
North Dakota	Audra Mari	Fargo	20	5 ft 10 in (1.78 m)	1st Runner-Up	Previously Miss North Dakota Teen USA 2011; Later Miss World America 2016
Ohio	Madison Gesiotto	Massillon	22	5 ft 6 in (1.68 m)		
Oklahoma	Brooklynne Young	Norman	19	5 ft 10 in (1.78 m)	Top 20	
Oregon	Emma Pelett	Portland	25	5 ft 7 in (1.70 m)		
Pennsylvania	Valerie Gatto	Pittsburgh	24	5 ft 5 in (1.65 m)	Top 20	
Rhode Island	Christina Palavra	Providence	19	5 ft 11 in (1.80 m)		Miss Congeniality
South Carolina	Christina Zapolski	Charleston	22	6 ft 0 in (1.83 m)	Top 10	Reality contestant of Hunted
South Dakota	Brittney Palmer	Brookings	25	5 ft 8 in (1.73 m)		
Tennessee	Kristy Landers Niedenfuer	Nashville	22	5 ft 10 in (1.78 m)	Top 20	Later Miss Louisiana World 2015
Texas	Lauren Guzman	Laredo	24	5 ft 10 in (1.78 m)		Previously Miss Texas Teen USA 2008
Utah	Angelia Layton	Salt Lake City	22	5 ft 8 in (1.73 m)		Previously Miss Utah Teen USA 2010; Contestant on Survivor: Philippines
Vermont	Gina Bernasconi	Colchester	19	5 ft 7 in (1.70 m)		
Virginia	Arielle Rosmarino	Salem	22	5 ft 10 in (1.78 m)	Top 20	Later Miss Virginia World 2015
Washington	Allyson Rowe	Spokane	25	5 ft 6 in (1.68 m)		
West Virginia	Charisse Haislop	Parkersburg	24	5 ft 8 in (1.73 m)		
Wisconsin	Bishara Dorre	Milwaukee	24	5 ft 7 in (1.70 m)	Top 10	Previously Miss Wisconsin Teen USA 2006; Previously Miss Wisconsin's Outstanding Teen 2007
Wyoming	Lexi Hill	Gillette	20	5 ft 4 in (1.63 m)		

== Judges ==
Preliminary judges:

- Bryce Townsend
- Carole Gist - Miss USA 1990 from Michigan
- Chantal "Taly" Russell
- Elise Zealand
- Fred Nelson
- Janna Ronert
- Jeanne Burns
- Scott Balber

Telecast Judges:

- Rumer Willis
- Allie LaForce - Miss Teen USA 2005 from Ohio
- Bárbara Palacios - Miss Universe 1986 from Venezuela
- Ian Ziering
- Randy Couture
- Melissa Peterman
- Lance Bass
- Karl Malone
- Dolvett Quince

== Background music ==
- Opening – "Iko Iko," "Take A Ride On A Riverboat," "Home," and "Hey Pocky A-Way" by Marc Broussard featuring Dirty Dozen Brass Band Horns (Live Performance)
- Swimsuit Competition – "Cruise" by Florida Georgia Line featuring Nelly (Live Performance)
- Evening Gown Competition – "Decidiste dejarme" and "Tu tiempo ya se fue" by Camila (Live Performance)
- Top 6 Final Look – "This Is How We Roll" by Florida Georgia Line (Live Performance)

== International broadcasters ==
=== Television ===
- United States: NBC
- Africa: DSTV Mzansi Magic (delayed broadcast)
- Asia: Star World (delayed broadcast)
