= Miss North Dakota Teen USA =

Beauty pageant competition

- Formation: 1983
- Type: Beauty pageant
- Headquarters: Des Moines
- Location: Iowa
- Members: Miss Teen USA
- Official language: English
- Website: Official website

The Miss North Dakota Teen USA competition is the pageant that selects the representative for the state of North Dakota in the Miss Teen USA pageant.

Compared to the sister Miss North Dakota USA pageant, North Dakota Teen USAs have been quite successful at Miss Teen USA, and are ranked fifteenth in terms of number and value of placements . North Dakota is one of only ten states to have had nine or more semifinalist (or better) placements at Miss Teen USA . Despite this, no Miss North Dakota Teen USA has ever won the Miss Teen USA crown, though both Audra Mari and Caitlyn Vogel finished as 1st runner-up in 2011 and 2019 respectively.

Eight Miss North Dakota Teen USAs have gone on to win Miss North Dakota USA, and more unusually, two have competed at Miss America, including Stacey Thomas who is the most recent Miss North Dakota Teen USA delegate to compete at the Miss America pageant.

Audrey Emerson of Fargo was crowned Miss North Dakota Teen USA 2026 on May 30, 2026, at the Franklin Center in Des Moines. She will represent North Dakota at Miss Teen USA 2026.

== Results summary ==
=== Placements ===
- 1st runners-up: Audra Mari (2011), Caitlyn Vogel (2019)
- 2nd runner-up: Katie Cooper (2006)
- 4th runners-up: Dayna Decker (1987), Heidi Langseth (1989)
- Top 6: Nicci Elkins (1991)
- Top 10: Kari Larson (1984), Jill Hutchinson (1985), Katrina Bergstrom (1996), Julie Nagle (1997), Marisa Field (2003)
- Top 15: Breanna Abernathy (2004)
- Top 20: Morgan Schwindt (2023)

North Dakota holds a record of 13 placements at Miss Teen USA.

=== Awards ===
- Miss Congeniality: Heidi Langseth (1989), Breanna Abernathy (2004)

== Winners ==
- Declared as Winner
- Ended as runner-up
- Ended as one of the finalists or semifinalists

Year	Name	Hometown	Age^{1}	Local title	Placement at Miss Teen USA	Special awards at Miss Teen USA	Notes
2026	Audrey Emerson	Fargo	15				
2025	Sofia Console	Fargo	19	Miss Fargo Teen			
2024	Jaycee Parker	Minot	17	Miss Minot AFB Teen			
2023	Morgan Schwindt	Fargo	19	Miss Fargo Teen	Top 20		
2022	Berkley Lundeen	Minot	18	Miss Minot Teen			Cousin of Caitlyn Vogel, Miss North Dakota Teen USA 2019 and Miss North Dakota USA 2021
2021	Aspen Hennessy	Des Lacs	18	Miss Des Lacs Teen			
2020	Amanda Higginbotham	Grand Forks	18				Later Miss Volunteer America 2027
2019	Caitlyn Vogel	Minot	18		1st runner-up		Later Miss North Dakota USA 2021; 1st runner-up at Miss USA 2021; She is the second woman to make 1st runner-up at both Miss Teen USA and Miss USA; Cousin of Berkley Lundeen, Miss North Dakota Teen USA 2022
2018	Ashlyn Erickson	Fargo	17				
2017	Kilyn Parisien-Hill	Belcourt	16				
2016	Paige Mathison	Fargo	15				
2015	Hannah Nelson	Hunter	18				
2014	Josie Hettich	Bismarck	18				
2013	Emilee Mahar	Fargo	17				
2012	Tiffany Fletschock	Casselton	18				
2011	Audra Diane Mari	Fargo	16		1st runner-up		Later Miss North Dakota USA 2014; 1st runner-up at Miss USA 2014 pageant; She is the first woman to make 1st runner-up at both Miss Teen USA and Miss USA; Later Miss World America 2016; Top 11 at Miss World 2016
2010	Ariana Walker	Bismarck	19	Miss Bismarck Teen			Previously Miss North Dakota's Outstanding Teen 2008; Later Miss North Dakota 2011
2009	Codi Miller	Amidon	15				Later North Dakota High School Rodeo Queen 2010; Later Miss North Dakota USA 2024
2008	Gretchen Joanne Dawley	Munich	17				
2007	Taylor Ellen Kearns	Fargo	18				Later Miss North Dakota USA 2010
2006	Katie Marie Cooper	Westhope	17		2nd runner-up		
2005	Caitlin Brown	Colgate	17				
2004	Breanna Ranae Abernathey	Lansford	18		Top 15	Miss Congeniality	
2003	Marisa Christina Field	Fargo	17		Top 10		
2002	Jessica Ann Deringer	Bismarck	18				
2001	Stacey Thomas	Fargo	18				Later Miss North Dakota 2002
2000	Amy Kensok	Fargo	15				
1999	Natalie Larson	Cooperstown	15				
1998	Brandy Smolen	Dickinson	16				
1997	Julie Nagle	Fargo	18		Top 10, finishing in 8th Place		
1996	Katrina Bergstrom	Fargo	17		Top 10, finishing in 9th place		First runner-up at Miss North Dakota Teen USA 1995
1995	Jessica Spier	West Fargo	17				Younger sister of Juliette Spier, Miss North Dakota Teen USA 1992 and Miss North Dakota USA 1996; First runner-up at Miss North Dakota Teen USA 1994; Later second-runner up at Miss North Dakota USA 1998
1994	Alison Nesemeier	Casselton	16				Later Miss North Dakota USA 1998
1993	Wendy Howe	Grand Forks	18				
1992	Juliette Anne Spier	West Fargo	16				Older sister of Jessica Spier, Miss North Dakota Teen USA 1995; Later Miss North Dakota USA 1996; Finished 6th at Miss USA 1996 pageant
1991	Nicci Elkins	Grand Forks	17		Top 6 Finishing in 4th Place		Later Miss North Dakota 1994; Cousin of Amy Elkins, Miss North Dakota USA 2002
1990	Sherry Lynn Bernotas	Fargo	18				
1989	Heidi Jo Langseth	Fargo	17		4th runner-up	Miss Congeniality	
1988	Jennifer Seminary	Fargo	17				Later Miss North Dakota USA 1993
1987	Dayna Marie Decker	Fargo	17		4th runner-up		Fourth runner-up at Miss North Dakota Teen USA 1986
1986	Shannon Kaiser	Williston	15				
1985	Jill Hutchinson	Fargo	17		Top 10, finishing in 7th Place		First runner-up at Miss North Dakota Teen USA 1984
1984	Kari Lee Larson	Bismarck	17		Top 10, finishing in 6th Place		Later first runner-up at Miss North Dakota USA 1988; Later Miss North Dakota USA 1990
1983	Lisa Marie Rubin	Grand Forks	18				

^{1} Age at the time of the Miss Teen USA pageant
