= Audra Mari =

American model and television host (born 1994)

- Born: Audra Diane Mari; January 8, 1994 (age 32); Fargo, North Dakota, U.S.
- Education: North Dakota State University
- Height: 1.77 m (5 ft 10 in)
- Spouse: Josh Duhamel (m. 2022)
- Children: 2
- Beauty pageant titleholder
- Title: Miss North Dakota Teen USA 2011; Miss North Dakota USA 2014; Miss World America 2016
- Hair color: Brown
- Eye color: Green
- Major competitions: Miss North Dakota Teen USA 2011; (Winner); Miss Teen USA 2011; (1st Runner-Up); Miss North Dakota USA 2014; (Winner); Miss USA 2014; (1st Runner-Up); Miss World America 2016; (Winner); Miss World 2016; (Top 11)

Audra Diane Mari (born January 8, 1994) is an American model, television host and beauty pageant titleholder. She was crowned Miss World America 2016 on July 8, 2016, and represented the United States at Miss World 2016. She also represented the state of North Dakota at the Miss Teen USA 2011 and Miss USA 2014, pageants where she was placed 1st Runner-Up in each pageant.

== Early life ==
Mari was born on January 8, 1994, in Fargo, North Dakota. Her grandfather is from the Philippines. Mari attended Davies High School in Fargo. In an interview with Seventeen, she discussed being bullied during her sophomore year of high school. She attended North Dakota State University, where she studied public relations and communications.

== Career ==
=== Pageantry ===
Mari represented the state of North Dakota on July 16, 2011, at Atlantis Paradise Island in Nassau, Bahamas where she placed 1st runner-up. Three years later she won the Miss North Dakota USA 2014 title. In the Miss USA 2014 pageant held in Baton Rouge, Louisiana, she again placed 1st runner-up. This was the highest placement for a contestant from North Dakota.

On July 8, 2016, Mari was crowned Miss World America 2016 at National Harbor in Washington, D.C. She represented the United States at the Miss World 2016 pageant on December 18, 2016, where she placed 6th. Because Mari was the highest placing Miss World contestant from the Americas, she was awarded the title of Miss World Americas 2016.

=== Modeling and television ===
At age 20, Mari moved to Miami to pursue a modeling career. Her credits include gracing the cover of Ocean Drive Swimsuit issue and appearing in numerous H&M ads. Mari segued into hosting a television show on the Welcome Channel and in 2021, a local travel show for InForum online media.

== Personal life ==
Mari began dating actor Josh Duhamel in late 2018. They announced their engagement on January 8, 2022, and married on September 10, 2022.

On September 11, 2023, they announced that they were expecting a baby. Their son Shepherd Lawrence was born on January 11, 2024. On May 16, 2026, their daughter Rocca de Leon was born.

Awards and achievements
Preceded by (Brazil) Catharina Choi Nunes	Miss World Americas; 2016	Succeeded by (Mexico) Andrea Meza
Preceded by Victoria Mendoza	Miss World America; 2016	Succeeded by Clarissa Bowers
Preceded by Mary-Margaret McCord	Miss USA 1st runner-up 2014	Succeeded by Ylianna Guerra
Preceded by Stephanie Erickson	Miss North Dakota USA; 2014	Succeeded by Molly Ketterling
Preceded by Lexi Atkins	Miss Teen USA 1st runner-up 2011	Succeeded by Elizabeth Sabatino
Preceded by Ariana Walker	Miss North Dakota Teen USA; 2011	Succeeded by Tiffany Fletschock
