= Delanie Wiedrich =

Miss North Dakota 2015 (born 1996)

Delanie Jane Wiedrich
- Born: Delanie Jaye Wiedrich; May 8, 1996 (age 30); Walnut Creek, California
- Education: Minnesota State University, Mankato
- Beauty pageant titleholder
- Title: Miss Dickinson 2014; Miss Grand Forks 2015; Miss North Dakota 2015
- Major competition: Miss America 2016
- Website: http://missdelanie.weebly.com/

Delanie Jane Wiedrich (born May 8, 1996 in Walnut Creek, California) is an American beauty pageant titleholder from Hazen, North Dakota, who was crowned Miss North Dakota 2015. She competed for the Miss America 2016 title in September 2015.

== Pageant career ==
In June 2013, Wiedrich won the Miss Dickinson 2014 title. She chose not to compete in the 2014 Miss North Dakota pageant. Instead, Wiedrich spent the summer as a Burning Hills Singer in the Medora Musical, North Dakota.

On October 25, 2014, Delanie was crowned Miss Grand Forks 2015 which made her eligible to compete for the 2015 Miss North Dakota title. Entering the state pageant in June 2015 as one of 24 finalists, Wiedrich's preliminary competition talent was a Broadway-style vocal performance of "On My Own" from Jekyll & Hyde. Her platform is an anti-teenage bullying campaign dubbed "Beyond the B Word".

Wiedrich won the competition on June 13, 2015, when she received her crown from outgoing Miss Housing title holder Jacky Arness. She earned $17,500 in scholarship money from the state pageant.

As Miss North Dakota, her activities include public appearances across the state of North Dakota. Wiedrich was North Dakota's representative at the Miss America 2016 pageant in Atlantic City, New Jersey, in September 2015.

== Early life and education ==
Wiedrich is a native of Tracy, California, whose family relocated to Hazen, North Dakota, in 2001. Wiedrich is a 2014 graduate of Hazen High School.

Wiedrich is a student at Minnesota State University, Mankato where she studies theater and dance.

Awards and achievements
Preceded by Jacky Arness	Miss North Dakota; 2015	Succeeded by Macy Christianson
