= Macy Bolinske =

American politician

Member of the North Dakota House of Representatives from the 40th district
- Incumbent
- Assumed office December 1, 2024
- Preceded by: Clara Sue Price

Personal details
- Party: Republican
- Education: University of North Dakota
- Website: macybolinske.com

Macy Bolinske (née Christianson) is an American politician serving as a member of the North Dakota House of Representatives from the 40th district. A Republican, she was elected in the 2024 North Dakota House of Representatives election. In 2016, she was crowned Miss North Dakota and later competed in Miss America 2017. She was also crowned Miss North Dakota USA 2020 and competed at Miss USA 2020.

Awards and achievements
Preceded by Samantha Redding	Miss North Dakota USA; 2020	Succeeded by Caitlyn Vogel
Preceded by Delanie Wiedrich	Miss North Dakota; 2016	Succeeded by Cara Mund
