= Lexi Atkins =

American beauty queen, actress (born 1993)

- Born: Alexis Atkins; February 10, 1993 (age 33); Champaign, Illinois, U.S.
- Occupations: Actress, model
- Known for: Miss Illinois Teen USA 2010; Runner up Miss Teen USA 2010; Miss Illinois USA 2014

Alexis Atkins (born February 10, 1993) is an American actress, model and beauty pageant titleholder who was crowned Miss Illinois Teen USA and, four years later, Miss Illinois USA. She may be best known for her role in the 2015 film The Boy Next Door, starring Jennifer Lopez.

== Career ==
Atkins was born and raised in Champaign, Illinois. Having won several beauty pageants in her home-state, Atkins received her first acting opportunity in 2014 with the direct-to-video Zombeavers; her first feature film was a supporting role in the 2015 release, The Boy Next Door. Alongside her acting and modeling work, she also opened Tely Organics, a juice bar and organic foods shop, in her childhood hometown in 2020.

== Filmography ==
Film and television roles
Year	Title	Role	Notes
2014	Zombeavers	Jenn	Direct-to-video
2014	Anatomy of Deception	Olivia	TV movie
2014	White Dwarf	Lexi	
2015	The Boy Next Door	Allie Callahan	
2015	The Messengers	Alice	2 episodes
2015	Some Kind of Hate	Christine	
2015	Ted 2	Waitress	
2016	Accidentally Engaged	Maya Wilton	TV movie
2017	Hawaii Five-0	Amanda Patterson	Episode: "Waimaka 'ele'ele"
2017	Can't Take It Back	Nicole	
2018	Altered Carbon	Belle	Episode: "Rage in Heaven"
2018	The Row	Ana Von Preussen	
2018	Killer in Law	Haley	
2020	The Orchard	Stacy Phillips	
2024	Model House	Bella Baylor	

Awards and achievements
Preceded by Stacie Juris	Miss Illinois Teen USA; 2010	Succeeded by Paige Higgerson
Preceded by Brooke Fletcher, Georgia	Miss Teen USA 1st runner-up 2010	Succeeded by Audra Mari, North Dakota
Preceded by Stacie Juris	Miss Illinois USA; 2014	Succeeded by Renee Wronecki
