= Miss World America 2016 =

Beauty pageant

- Date: July 8, 2016
- Presenters: Guy Lambert; Annie Yu
- Venue: National Harbor, Maryland, United States
- Entrants: 28
- Placements: 12
- Winner: Audra Mari; North Dakota
- Photogenic: Keilani Afalava; Washington

Miss World America 2016 was the 8th Miss World America pageant, held at the National Harbor in Washington, D.C., United States, on July 8, 2016.

Victoria Mendoza of Arizona crowned Audra Mari of North Dakota as her successor at the end of the event. Mari represented the United States at the Miss World 2016 pageant on December 20 in Washington, D.C., and placed Top 11.

== Results ==
=== Placements ===
Placement	Contestant
Miss World America 2016	North Dakota – Audra Mari
1st Runner-Up	North Carolina – Shivali Patel
2nd Runner-Up	Virginia – Sasha Perea
3rd Runner-Up	District of Columbia – Michelle Pierrot
4th Runner-Up	Mississippi – Andrea Hightower
Top 12	Michigan – Azia Hernandez; Maryland – Christina Denny; Illinois – Leslie Hawkins; Texas – Rachel White; Maryland – Sujita Basnet; Maryland – Tarese Taylor §; Texas – Tarryn Shelman §

§ Voted into the Top 12 by America as the "People's Choice" (ties).

== Challenge events ==
=== Interview ===
Final Result	Contestant
Winner	North Dakota - Audra Mari
Top 5	Rhode Island - Amara Berry; Illinois - Leslie Hawkins; District of Columbia - Michelle Pierrot; Virginia - Sasha Perea

=== Beauty with a Purpose ===
Final Result	Contestant
Winner	Rhode Island - Amara Berry
Top 5	Tennessee - Dymond Elise Hayes; Maryland - Ruby Johnson; Virginia - Sasha Perea; North Carolina - Shivali Patel

=== Beach Beauty ===
Final Result	Contestant
Winner	Virginia - Sasha Perea
Top 5	Mississippi - Andrea Hightower; North Dakota - Audra Mari; North Carolina - Shivali Patel; Maryland - Sujita Basnet

=== Top Model ===
Final Result	Contestant
Winners	North Dakota - Audra Mari (ties); North Carolina - Shivali Patel (ties)
Top 5	Michigan - Azia Hernandez; District of Columbia - Michelle Pierrot; Maryland - Sujita Basnet

=== Sports & Fitness ===
Final Result	Contestant
Winner	Texas - Rachel White
Top 5	Maryland - Christina Denny; Massachusetts - Maude Gorman; Maryland - Ruby Johnson; North Carolina - Shivali Patel

=== Multimedia ===
Final Result	Contestant
Winner	Tennessee - Dymond Hayes
Top 5	Maryland - Tarese Taylor; North Carolina - Shivali Patel; Mississippi - Andrea Hightower; Illinois - Leslie Hawkins

=== Talent ===
Final Result	Contestant
Winner	California - Salisha Thomas
Top 3	Massachusetts - Maude Gorman; North Carolina - Shivali Patel

=== Most Photogenic ===
Final Result	Contestant
Winner	Washington - Keilani Afalava

=== People's Choice ===
Final Result	Contestant
Winner	Maryland - Tarese Taylor; Texas - Tarryn Shelman

== Contestants ==
- The Miss World America 2016 contestants are:

N°	Name	Age	Hometown	State
1	Amanda Pedrianes	25	Thornton	Colorado
2	Amara Berry	22	Providence	Rhode Island
3	Andrea Hightower	18	Oxford	Mississippi
4	Annysia Arthur	23	Seattle	Washington
5	Audra Mari	22	Fargo	North Dakota
6	Azia Hernandez	22	Detroit	Michigan
7	Christina Denny	25	Baltimore	Maryland
8	Dymond Elise Hayes	19	Memphis	Tennessee
9	Faatima Brown	21	Lorton	Virginia
10	Hiam Amani Hafizuddin	20	Chicago	Illinois
11	Keilani Afalava	26	Seattle	Washington
12	Kelsey Knutsen	26	Hartford	Connecticut
13	Leslie Hawkins	23	Chicago	Illinois
14	Maria Barrero	24	Chicago	Illinois
15	Martina Bandoo	17	Atlanta	Georgia
16	Maude Gorman	22	Hingham	Massachusetts
17	Michelle Pierrot	24	Washington, D.C.	District of Columbia
18	Natalie Macdisi	21	Virginia Beach	Virginia
19	Rachel White	24	Houston	Texas
20	Ramina Ashfaque	25	Jacksonville	Florida
21	Ruby Johnson	19	Annapolis	Maryland
22	Salisha Thomas	21	Los Angeles	California
23	Sasha Perea	22	Richmond	Virginia
24	Shivali Patel	19	Raleigh	North Carolina
25	Sujita Basnet	23	Baltimore	Maryland
26	Tarese Taylor	25	Baltimore	Maryland
27	Tarryn Shelman	20	Houston	Texas
28	Yvette Blaess	24	Virginia Beach	Virginia

== Other pageant notes ==
=== Withdrawals ===
- Alabama
- Alaska
- American Samoa
- Arizona
- Arkansas
- Delaware
- Hawaii
- Idaho
- Indiana
- Iowa
- Kansas
- Kentucky
- Louisiana
- Maine
- Minnesota
- Missouri
- Montana
- Nebraska
- Nevada
- New Hampshire
- New Jersey - "Sameera Khan"
- New Mexico
- New York - Michaela Rose Kenny
- Ohio
- Oklahoma
- Oregon
- Pennsylvania
- South Carolina
- South Dakota
- Utah - Misha Kaura
- Vermont
- West Virginia
- Wisconsin

=== Did not compete ===
- Wyoming

=== Crossovers ===
Contestants who previously competed at other beauty pageants:

Miss World America

- 2015: Massachusetts: Maude Gorman (Top 12)
- 2015: Rhode Island: Amara Berry
- 2015: Texas: Rachel White (2nd Runner-up)
- 2017: North Carolina: Shivali Patel (Top 16)
- 2017: New York: Michaela Rose Kenny
- 2017: Virginia: Sasha Perea (Top 16)
- 2018: North Carolina: Shivali Patel (2nd Runner-up)

Miss Universe

- 2021: Maryland: Sujita Basnet (as Nepal)

Miss America

- 2014: Maryland: Christina Denny (Top 10)

Miss USA

- 2014: North Dakota: Audra Mari (1st runner-up)
- 2016: Maryland: Christina Denny
- 2021: Virginia: Sasha Perea (as District of Columbia)

Miss Teen USA

- 2011: North Dakota: Audra Mari (1st runner-up)
- 2015: Mississippi: Andrea Hightower

Miss U.S. International

- 2015: Connecticut: Kelsey Knutsen (Top 15)
- 2016: Tennessee: Dymond Elise Hayes

Miss Earth United States

- 2015: Maryland: Ruby Johnson (Finalist)
- 2017: Connecticut: Kelsey Knutsen (as US Virgin Islands)
- 2017: Colorado: Amanda Pedrianes (Unplaced)
- 2017: Washington: Annyssia Arthur (Unplaced)

Miss United States

- 2015: New Jersey: Sameera Khan (Finalist)
- 2014: Texas: Rachel White (Top 16)

National American Miss Jr. Teen

- 2011: North Carolina: Shivali Patel (2nd runner-up)

Miss Pakistan World

- 2016: Florida: Ramina Ashfaque (Miss Earth Pakistan 2017)

Miss Earth

- 2017: Florida: Ramina Ashfaque (as Pakistan)

Supermodel International

- 2016: Connecticut: Kelsey Knutsen (Top 15; as United States)

Miss Grand International

- 2021: Florida: Ramina Ashfaque (as Pakistan)
- 2021–2022: Illinois: Hiam Amani Hafizuddin (National Director for Bangladesh)
- 2021–2024: Illinois: Hiam Amani Hafizuddin (National Director for Pakistan)
