= Tolna, North Dakota =

- City
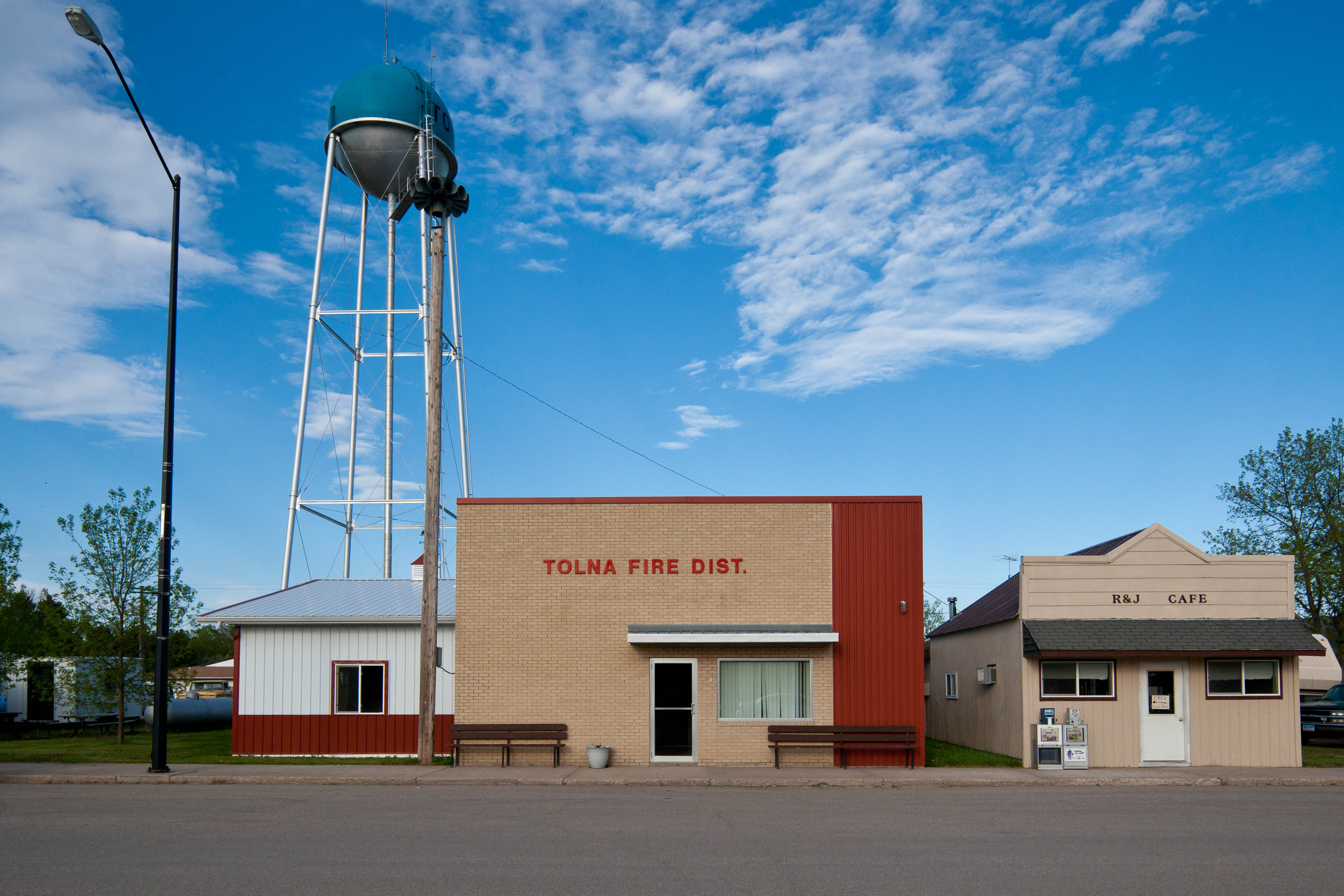
- Fire Department building in Tolna

- Location of Tolna, North Dakota
- Coordinates: 47°49′33″N 98°26′17″W
- Country: United States
- State: North Dakota
- County: Nelson
- Founded: 1906

Area
  - Total: 0.75 sq mi (1.95 km^{2})
  - Land: 0.75 sq mi (1.95 km^{2})
  - Water: 0 sq mi (0.00 km^{2})
- Elevation: 1,480 ft (450 m)

Population (2020)
  - Total: 136
  - Estimate (2024): 133
  - Density: 180.8/sq mi (69.79/km^{2})
- Time zone: UTC–6 (Central (CST))
  - Summer (DST): UTC–5 (CDT)
- ZIP Code: 58380
- Area code: 701
- FIPS code: 38-79180
- GNIS feature ID: 1036297
- Website: tolnand.govoffice.com

Tolna is a city in Nelson County, North Dakota, United States. The population was 136 at the 2020 census. Tolna was founded in 1906.

== Geography ==
According to the United States Census Bureau, the city has a total area of 0.76 square miles (1.97 km^{2}), all land.

== Demographics ==
Historical population
Census	Pop.	Note	%±
1910	209		—
1920	199		−4.8%
1930	174		−12.6%
1940	172		−1.1%
1950	281		63.4%
1960	291		3.6%
1970	247		−15.1%
1980	241		−2.4%
1990	230		−4.6%
2000	202		−12.2%
2010	166		−17.8%
2020	136		−18.1%
2024 (est.)	133		−2.2%
U.S. Decennial Census; 2020 Census

=== 2010 census ===
As of the 2010 census, there were 166 people, 93 households, and 49 families residing in the city. The population density was 218.4 inhabitants per square mile (84.3/km^{2}). There were 109 housing units at an average density of 143.4 per square mile (55.4/km^{2}). The racial makeup of the city was 97.0% White, 1.8% Native American, and 1.2% from two or more races.

There were 93 households, of which 15.1% had children under the age of 18 living with them, 46.2% were married couples living together, 4.3% had a female householder with no husband present, 2.2% had a male householder with no wife present, and 47.3% were non-families. 44.1% of all households were made up of individuals, and 23.6% had someone living alone who was 65 years of age or older. The average household size was 1.78 and the average family size was 2.43.

The median age in the city was 56.3 years. 12.7% of residents were under the age of 18; 3.5% were between the ages of 18 and 24; 15% were from 25 to 44; 39.6% were from 45 to 64; and 28.9% were 65 years of age or older. The gender makeup of the city was 50.6% male and 49.4% female.

=== 2000 census ===
As of the 2000 census, there were 202 people, 104 households, and 50 families residing in the city. The population density was 260.8 inhabitants per square mile (100.7/km^{2}). There were 118 housing units at an average density of 152.3 per square mile (58.8/km^{2}). The racial makeup of the city was 99.01% White, 0.50% Native American, and 0.50% from two or more races.

There were 104 households, out of which 22.1% had children under the age of 18 living with them, 41.3% were married couples living together, 7.7% had a female householder with no husband present, and 51.0% were non-families. 47.1% of all households were made up of individuals, and 35.6% had someone living alone who was 65 years of age or older. The average household size was 1.94 and the average family size was 2.82.

In the city, the population was spread out, with 20.3% under the age of 18, 4.5% from 18 to 24, 20.8% from 25 to 44, 24.8% from 45 to 64, and 29.7% who were 65 years of age or older. The median age was 49 years. For every 100 females, there were 64.2 males. For every 100 females age 18 and over, there were 62.6 males.

The median income for a household in the city was $23,000, and the median income for a family was $45,000. Males had a median income of $31,250 versus $17,188 for females. The per capita income for the city was $18,430. None of the families and 11.3% of the population were living below the poverty line, including no under eighteens and 29.5% of those over 64.
