= Miss Colorado =

Beauty pageant competition

- Formation: 1926
- Type: Beauty pageant
- Headquarters: Denver
- Location: Colorado
- Members: Miss America
- Official language: English
- Website: Official website

The Miss Colorado competition is the pageant that selects the representative for the state of Colorado in the Miss America pageant. The Colorado representative has won the Miss America crown on four occasions.

Gabrielle Burns of Parker was crowned Miss Colorado 2026 on June 13, 2026, at the Bunker Auditorium in the Green Center at the Colorado School of Mines in Golden. She competed for the title of Miss America 2027 on September 6, 2026, at the Kravis Center for the Performing Arts in West Palm Beach, Florida.

Fort Smith, Arkansas native Madison Isabella Marsh of Colorado Springs, Colorado was crowned Miss Colorado 2023 on May 27, 2023, at The PACE Center in Parker, Colorado. She competed for and won the title of Miss America 2024 in Orlando, Florida on January 14, 2024.

== Results summary ==
The following is a visual summary of the past results of Miss Colorado titleholders at the national Miss America pageants/competitions. The year in parentheses indicates the year of the national competition during which a placement and/or award was garnered, not the year attached to the contestant's state title.

=== Placements ===
- Miss Americas: Sharon Ritchie (1956), Marilyn Van Derbur (1958), Rebecca Ann King (1974), Madison Marsh (2024)
- 1st runners-up: Maya Walker (1989)
- 2nd runners-up: Debbie Riecks (1990), Kelley Johnson (2016)
- 3rd runners-up: Sylvia Canaday (1949), LaTayna Hall (1988)
- Top 7: Monica Thompson (2020)
- Top 10: Cheryl Sweeten (1964), Adria Easton (1970), Karrie Mitchell (1991), Ellery Jones (2019)
- Top 11: Alexandra Lotko (2025)
- Top 12: Katie Layman (2010)
- Top 15: Delores Conrad (1926)

=== Awards ===
==== Preliminary awards ====
- Preliminary Lifestyle and Fitness: Sylvia Canaday (1949), Karrie Mitchell (1991)
- Preliminary Fitness: Gabrielle Gramont (2026)

==== Non-finalist awards ====
- Non-finalist Talent: Tia Tyler (1968), Cathy Glau (1972), Suzan Hogan (1978), Kimberly Christiansen (1981), Deborah Davids (1983), Carol Johnson (1987), Michelle Stanley (1997), Keely Gaston (1999), Shannon Patilla (2017), Meredith Winnefeld (2018)

==== Other awards ====
- Miss Congeniality: Tia Tyler (1968)
- STEM Scholarship Award Winners: Kelley Johnson (2016)
- Women in Business Scholarship Award Winners: Meredith Winnefeld (2018)
- AHA Go Red for Women Leadership Award Overall Winner: Alexandra Lotko (2025)

== Winner ==
- Declared as winner
- Ended as a runner-up
- Ended as a finalist or semi-finalist

	Name	Hometown	Age	Local Title	Miss America Talent	Placement at Miss America	Special scholarships at Miss America	Notes
2026	Gabrielle Burns	Parker	23	Miss Rocky Mountain	Vocal, “Mamma Mia”			
2025	Gabrielle Gramont	Fort Collins	22	Miss Fort Collins	Jazz Dance, “Diamonds are a Girl’s Best Friend”		Preliminary Fitness Award	
2024	Alexandra Lotko	Denver	26	Miss Front Range	Vocal, "My Funny Valentine"	Top 11	AHA Go Red for Women Leadership Award Winner	
2023	Sarah Jean Swift	Castle Pines	20	Miss Rocky Mountain	Lyrical Dance	Did not compete; originally first runner-up, later assumed the title after Marsh was named Miss America 2024		4th runner-up at Miss Texas 2025 and 2026
2023	Madison Marsh	Colorado Springs / Fort Smith	21	Miss Academy	HERStory (Original Monologue), "My First Solo Flight"	Winner		Graduate of the United States Air Force Academy First active-duty officer and graduate of a military service academy to win Miss Colorado First active-duty officer and graduate of a military service academy to win Miss America. Cousin of Miss Arkansas Teen USA 2021 and Miss Arkansas USA 2024 Madeline Bohlman
2022	Savannah Cavanaugh	Edwards	25	Miss Beaver Creek	Country Vocal, "White Liar"			
2021	Maura Spence Carroll	Fort Carson	21	Miss Fort Carson	Vocal, "Never Enough"			First active-duty soldier to win Miss Colorado
2020	No national pageant was held (Note: Pageant cancelled after state and national pageants postponed to 2021 due to the COVID-19 pandemic, but duties to be "performed by...women in the Forever Miss Colorado Sisterhood, as needed...")							
2019	Monica Thompson	Aurora	24	–	Classical Vocal, "Les Filles de Cadix"	Top 7		
2018	Ellery Jones	Greenwood Village	21	Miss Greenwood Village	Spoken Word	Top 10		
2017	Meredith Winnefeld	Highlands Ranch	23	Miss Highlands Ranch	Dance/Twirl, "He's a Pirate"		Non-finalist Talent Award Women in Business Scholarship Award	Previously Miss Colorado's Outstanding Teen 2011; Top 10 at Miss America's Outstanding Teen 2012 pageant
2016	Shannon Patilla	Denver	24	Miss Mile High	Vocal, "Something's Got a Hold on Me"		Non-finalist Talent Award	
2015	Kelley Johnson	Windsor	22	Miss Northern Colorado	Original Monologue, "Not Just a Nurse"	2nd runner-up	STEM Scholarship Award	Appeared on The Ellen DeGeneres Show to discuss her nursing monologue and received $10,000 from Shutterfly for nurse anesthetist school Later Miss California USA 2018; Top 10 at Miss USA 2018 pageant
2014	Stacey Cook	Littleton	23	Miss Rocky Mountain	Tahitian Dance, "Runaway Baby"			Contestant at National Sweetheart 2012 pageant
2013	Meg Kardos	Denver	23	Miss Metropolitan	Classical Vocal, "Habanera"			
2012	Hannah Porter	Centennial	24	Miss Rocky Mountain	Tap Dance, "Boom Boom"			Top 10 at National Sweetheart 2011 pageant
2011	Diana Dreman	Denver	23	Miss Boulder County	Musical Theater Dance, "Crazy Little Thing Called Love"			Daughter of Miss America 1974, Rebecca Ann King
2010	Melaina Shipwash	Colorado Springs	24	Miss Colorado Springs	Tap Dance, "9 to 5"			
2009	Katie Layman	Aurora	23	Miss Douglas County	Contemporary Lyrical Dance, "The Way I Am"	Top 12		
2008	Jamie Dukehart-Conti	Arvada	23	Miss Broomfield	Jazz Dance			
2007	Maggie Ireland	Littleton	22	Miss Littleton	Irish Step Dance, "Dueling Violins" & "Footloose"			
2006	Janie Allen	Arvada	23	Miss Parker	Piano Medley, "Concerto in A Minor" & "Rhapsody in Blue"			
2005	Jessica Urban	Colorado Springs	24	Miss Highlands Ranch	Vocal / Harp, "If I Ain't Got You"			
2004	Laura Tobey	Denver	23	Miss Denver	Jazz Vocal, "Over the Rainbow"			
2003	Katee Doland	Arvada	23	Miss Denver	Lyrical Dance, "In His Eyes" from Jekyll & Hyde			Previously Miss Colorado Teen USA 1998; Top 10 at Miss Teen USA 1998; Previously Miss Colorado USA 2001; Miss Photogenic at Miss USA 2001 pageant
2002	Morgan O'Murray	Colorado Springs	21	Miss Centennial	Jazz Dance, "Sing, Sing, Sing"			Previously Miss Colorado Teen USA 1999 Former Denver Broncos cheerleader
2001	Kelly McKee	Parker	22	Miss Rocky Mountain	Lyrical Dance, "Someone Like You" from Jekyll & Hyde			
2000	Anamarie Bonafede	Loveland	22	Miss Centennial	Ballet, "How Majestic Is Your Name"			
1999	Erin MacGregor	Denver	23	Miss Columbine	Lyrical Ballet, "Celebration"			Later Miss Colorado USA 2003
1998	Keely Gaston	Morrison	20	Miss Rocky Mountain	Classical Ballet, "Kitri's Variation" from Don Quixote		Non-finalist Talent Award	Later Miss Colorado USA 2002
1997	Regina Flores	Colorado Springs	21	Miss Capital City	Vocal, "Don't Cry For Me Argentina"			
1996	Michelle Stanley	Littleton	20	Miss Capital City	Dramatic Monologue from Quilters		Non-finalist Talent Award	Later Miss Colorado USA 1998
1995	Amy Ciccolella	Monument	21	Miss Northern Front Range	Popular Vocal / Puppetry, "Can You Feel the Love Tonight"			
1994	Shellene Cockrell	Colorado Springs	24	Miss Colorado Springs	Tap Dance, "Sing, Sing, Sing"			
1993	Stephanie Irving	Colorado Springs	22	Miss Colorado Springs	Inspirational Vocal			
1992	Stacey Rose	Parker	22	Miss Metro South	Classical Violin, "Hungarian Dance No. 5" by Brahm			
1991	Colleen Walker	Pueblo	21	Miss Pueblo County	Vocal, "Wishing You Were Somehow Here Again" from The Phantom of the Opera			
1990	Karrie Mitchell	Arvada	24	Miss Arvada	Popular Vocal, "Vision of Love"	Top 10	Preliminary Lifestyle and Fitness Award	
1989	Debbie Riecks	Aurora	24	Miss Mile High/Front Range	Contemporary Flute, "Shenandoah" & "Dueling Banjos"	2nd runner-up		1st runner-up at America's Junior Miss 1983 pageant
1988	Maya Walker	Eagle-Vail	23	Miss Western Counties	Jazz Vocal, "Night and Day"	1st runner-up		Later Miss Oklahoma USA 1992
1987	LaTanya Hall	Boulder	22	Miss Boulder Valley	Vocal, "I Am Changing"	3rd runner-up		
1986	Carol Janson	Boulder	21	Miss Boulder Valley	Piano, "Revolutionary Etude"		Non-finalist Talent Award	
1985	Linda Trimmer	Denver	22	Miss Sterling	Vocal, "He Touched Me" from Drat! The Cat!			
1984	Lisa Frees	Thornton	25	Miss Adams County	Vocal, "I Got Rhythm"			
1983	Melanie Ann Scott	Littleton	21	Miss Denver	Jazz Acrobatic Dance, "Junkaroo Holiday"			
1982	Deborah Davids	Denver	22	Miss Chatfield	Harp, "Introduction et Allegro" by Maurice Ravel		Non-finalist Talent Award	
1981	Lynnette Jessen	Denver	20	Miss Jefferson County	Acrobatic Dance, "Theme from Exodus"			Later Miss Colorado USA 1985
1980	Kimberly Christiansen	Arvada	19	Miss Aurora	Baton Twirling, music from "The Main Event"		Non-finalist Talent Award	
1979	Sheliah Wilkins	Denver	23	Miss Denver	Classical Vocal, "Quando me'n vo'"			
1978	Catherine Brown	Littleton		Miss Littleton	Classical Vocal			
1977	Suzan Hogan	Colorado Springs	19	Miss Denver County	Flute, "Carnival of Venice"		Non-finalist Talent Award	
1976	Karen Land	Littleton	22	Miss Northeastern Junior College	Vibraphone, "Bandstand Boogie"			
1975	Penny Currier	Lakewood	22	Miss Lakewood	Concert Pedal Harp, "St. Louis Blues"			
1974	Cynthia Hunter	Denver	23	Miss Denver	Soft Shoe Dance, "Mame"			
1973	Gayle Holden	Denver	20	Miss Denver		Did not compete; later assumed the title after King won Miss America 1974		
1973	Rebecca Ann King	Sterling	23	Miss Metro Denver	Vocal, "If I Ruled the World"	Winner		Mother of Miss Colorado 2011, Diana Dremen
1972	Sally Anderson	Longmont	19	Miss Longmont	Classical Vocal, "Daydreams"			
1971	Cathy Glau	Denver	20	Miss Northern Colorado	Modern Jazz Dance, "Up, Up and Away"		Non-finalist Talent Award	
1970	Sue Gehrman	Fort Collins	18	Miss Northglen	Musical Interpretation, "Just You Wait" from My Fair Lady			
1969	Adria Easton	Boulder	21	Miss Boulder	Baton Twirling, Medley from Funny Girl	Top 10		
1968	Pamela Kerker	Sterling	21	Miss Sterling	Ballet / Jazz Dance, "By Myself" & "Babalu"			
1967	Tia Tyler	Golden	20	Miss Denver	Dramatic Reading, "Queendom Sequence" from You're a Good Man, Charlie Brown		Miss Congeniality (3-way tie) Non-finalist Talent Award	
1966	Holly Smith	Denver	19	Miss University of Denver	Popular Vocal			
1965	Kristina Holm	Denver	19		Piano, "More" from Gigi			
1964	Kathleen Knight	Denver	19	Miss May Days	Semi-classical Vocal, "The Telephone"			
1963	Cheryl Sweeten	Arvada	18	Miss Arvada	Dramatic Reading from Anastasia	Top 10		
1962	Sally Guinn	Westminster	18	Miss Westminster	Folk Vocal			
1961	Jane Lee McBurney	Denver	19	Miss University of Colorado	Piano Selection, "Malagueña"			
1960	Anne Walker	Littleton	18	Miss Aurora	Dance			
1959	Marlinda Mason	Denver	20		Dramatic Reading			
1958	Cynthia Cullen	Boulder			Drama, "Queen on Being Sentenced to Death"			
1957	Marilyn Van Derbur	Denver	20		Organ, "Tea for Two" & "Tenderly"	Winner		
1956	Polly Childs	Aurora			Drama			
1955	Sharon Ritchie	Denver	18		Recitation, "The Murder of Lidice" by Edna St. Vincent Millay	Winner		
1954	Barbara Busey	Denver			Vocal / Dance			
1953	Mary Donelan	Keenesburg			Dramatic Monologue from Of Mice and Men			
1952	Chardelle Hayward	Fort Collins			Piano			
1951	Jo London	Aurora			Dramatic Monologue			Assumed title when the original winner, Aber, resigned
1951	Marie Aber	Denver				N/A		
1950	Barbara Norrish	Longmont			Violin			
1949	Sylvia Canaday	Denver			Monologue from Dinner at Eight	3rd runner-up	Preliminary Lifestyle and Fitness Award	
1948	Virginia Smith	Pueblo						
1947	Joyce Haycock	Pueblo			Vocal, "Chi-Baba"			
1946	Raye Donnelly	Colorado Springs						
1945	No Colorado representative at Miss America pageant							
1944	No Colorado representative at Miss America pageant							
1943	No Colorado representative at Miss America pageant							
1942	No Colorado representative at Miss America pageant							
1941	Charlene Woods	Denver						
1940	Eileen Hoskins	Denver						
1939	No Colorado representative at Miss America pageant							
1938	Rosanna Bean	Montrose						
1937	No Colorado representative at Miss America pageant							
1936	No Colorado representative at Miss America pageant							
1935	No Colorado representative at Miss America pageant							
1934	No national pageant was held							
1933	No Colorado representative at Miss America pageant							
1932	No national pageants were held							
1931	No national pageants were held							
1930	No national pageants were held							
1929	No national pageants were held							
1928	No national pageants were held							
1927	Elva Yvette Roy			Miss Denver				Competed under local title at Miss America pageant
1926	Jeanette Roland			Miss Colorado				Multiple Colorado representatives Contestants competed under local title at Miss America pageant
1926	Delores Conrad			Miss Denver		Top 15		Multiple Colorado representatives Contestants competed under local title at Miss America pageant
1925	No Colorado representative at Miss America pageant							
1924	No Colorado representative at Miss America pageant							
1923	No Colorado representative at Miss America pageant							
1922	No Colorado representative at Miss America pageant							
1921	No Colorado representative at Miss America pageant							
