= Miss America 1960 =

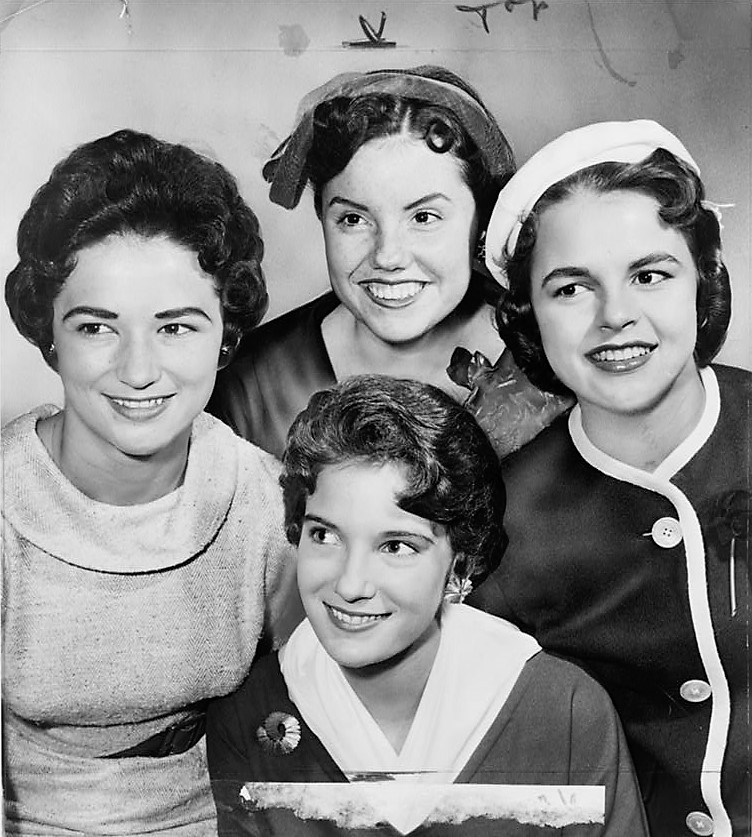
- Four Miss America 1960 candidates: Jacque Baker (Miss Iowa), Lynda Mead (Miss Mississippi and Miss America 1960, bottom), Sharon O'Neal (Miss Kansas), Suzie Jackson (Miss Arkansas)
- Date: September 12, 1959
- Presenters: Bert Parks
- Venue: Boardwalk Hall, Atlantic City, New Jersey
- Broadcaster: CBS
- Entrants: 54
- Placements: 10
- Winner: Lynda Lee Mead; Mississippi

Miss America 1960, the 33rd Miss America pageant, was held at the Boardwalk Hall in Atlantic City, New Jersey on September 12, 1959 on CBS.

Pageant winner Lynda Lee Mead was the second Miss Mississippi in a row to wear the crown, succeeding actress Mary Ann Mobley.

Among the other contestants was Ann Marston of Michigan, an archery champion who had appeared on the cover of the Aug. 8, 1955 edition of Sports Illustrated. Her skill with a bow and arrow won Marston the talent portion of the 1960 pageant.

Dawn Wells, later to star on the television series Gilligan's Island, represented Nevada in the Miss America 1960 competition.

== Results ==
=== Placements ===
| Placement | Contestant |
|---|---|
| Miss America 1960 | Mississippi – Lynda Lee Mead |
| 1st Runner-Up | Wisconsin – Mary Alice Fox |
| 2nd Runner-Up | Washington – Sharon Joyce Vaughn |
| 3rd Runner-Up | California – Susan Diane Bronson |
| 4th Runner-Up | Arizona – Patricia Anne Alebrand |
| Top 10 | Canada – Rosemary Catherine Keenan; Illinois – Suzanne Ingeborg Johnson; New York – Bonnie Jo Marquis; Pennsylvania – Lois Janet Piercy; Tennessee – Marion Lee Wayland |

=== Top 10 ===
1. Arizona
2. California
3. Canada
4. Illinois
5. Mississippi
6. New York
7. Pennsylvania
8. Tennessee
9. Washington
10. Wisconsin

=== Top 5 ===
1. Arizona
2. California
3. Mississippi
4. Washington
5. Wisconsin

=== Awards ===
==== Preliminary awards ====
| Awards | Contestant |
|---|---|
| Lifestyle and Fitness | (New York (state)) New York - Bonnie Jo Marquis; (Washington (state)) Washington - Sharon Joyce Vaughn; Wisconsin - Mary Alice Fox |
| Talent | Illinois - Suzanne I. Johnson; Michigan - Ann Penelope Marston; Connecticut - Diana Martha Klug (tie); (Washington, D.C.) District of Columbia - Virginia N. Pailes (tie); Pennsylvania - Lois Janet Piercy (tie) |

=== Other awards ===
| Awards | Contestant |
|---|---|
| Miss Congeniality | Hawaii - Gordean Leilehua Lee |
| Non-finalist Talent | Alabama - Betty Lindstrom; Kansas - Sharon O'Neal; Massachusetts - Sharon Faught; North Dakota - Claudia Gullickson; Oklahoma - Mary Ann Hazelton; Texas - Marilyn Turner; Vermont - Brenda Naatz; Virginia - Alice Sue Williams |

== Contestants ==
| State | Name | Hometown | Age | Talent | Placement | Awards | Notes |
|---|---|---|---|---|---|---|---|
| Alabama | Betty Jane Lindstrom | Birmingham | | | | Non-finalist Talent | |
| Alaska | Alansa Carr | | | | | | |
| Arizona | Patricia Anne Allebrand | | | Interpretive ballet | 4th Runner-Up | | |
| Arkansas | Suzie Jackson | | | | | | |
| California | Susan Diane Bronson | | | Modern jazz dance | 3rd Runner-Up | | |
| Canada | Rosemary Catherine Keenan | | | Original dramatic reading | Top 10 | | |
| Chicago | Carol Rubin | Chicago | | | | | |
| Colorado | Marlinda Mason | | | | | | |
| Connecticut | Diana Martha Klug | | | | | Preliminary Talent Award | |
| Delaware | Esther Olney | | | | | | |
| (Washington, D.C.) District of Columbia | Virginia Pailes | | | | | Preliminary Talent Award | |
| Florida | Nancy Purvis | | | | | | |
| (Georgia (U.S. state)) Georgia | Kayanne Shoffner | | | | | | |
| Hawaii | Gordean Leilehua Lee | | | | | Miss Congeniality | |
| Idaho | Tamara Ashby | | | | | | |
| Illinois | Suzanne Ingeborg Johnson | | | | Top 10 | Preliminary Talent Award | |
| Indiana | Barbara Kummer | | | | | | |
| Iowa | Jacque Baker | | | | | | |
| Kansas | Sharon O'Neal | | 18 | | | Non-finalist Talent | |
| Kentucky | Carol Brown | | | | | | |
| Louisiana | Mary Mills Hawkins | | | | | | |
| Maine | Linda Mills | | | | | | |
| Maryland | Marie True | | | | | | |
| Massachusetts | Sharon Faught | | | | | Non-finalist Talent | |
| Michigan | Ann Penelope Marston | | | | | Preliminary Talent Award | |
| Minnesota | Judy Ann Olson | | | | | | |
| Mississippi | Lynda Lee Mead | | | | Miss America 1960 | | |
| Missouri | Linda Mae Long | | | | | | |
| Montana | Sharon Tietjen | | | | | | |
| Nebraska | Joan Sipes | | 18 | | | | |
| Nevada | Dawn Elberta Wells | | | | | | |
| New Hampshire | Diane Harris | | | | | | |
| New Jersey | Beverly Domareki | | | | | | |
| New Mexico | Linda Moore | | | | | | |
| (New York (state)) New York | Bonnie Jo Marquis | | | Scene from Damn Yankees; "Whatever Lola Wants" | Top 10 | Preliminary Lifestyle and Fitness Award | |
| New York City | Elizabeth Holmes | New York City | | | | | |
| North Carolina | Judith Lynn Klipfel | | | | | | |
| North Dakota | Claudia Gullickson | | | | | Non-finalist Talent | |
| Ohio | Carole Weiler | | | | | | |
| Oklahoma | Mary Ann Hazelton | | | | | Non-finalist Talent | |
| Oregon | Karlyn Mattsson | | | | | | |
| Pennsylvania | Lois Janet Piercy | | | Painting, original flute composition | Top 10 | Preliminary Talent Award | |
| Rhode Island | Michaline Chomiez | Warwick | | | | | |
| South Carolina | Nettie Dennis | | | | | | |
| South Dakota | Meredith Auld | Britton | | | | | |
| Tennessee | Marion Lee Wayland | | | "Pres des remparts de Seville"; "I'm Just a Girl Who Can't Say No" | Top 10 | | |
| Texas | Marilyn Turner | | | | | Non-finalist Talent | |
| Utah | Jacqueline Winterrose | | | | | | |
| Vermont | Brenda Naatz | | | | | Non-finalist Talent | |
| Virginia | Alice Sue Williams | | | | | Non-finalist Talent | |
| (Washington (state)) Washington | Sharon Joyce Vaughn | | | "Habanero" | 2nd Runner-Up | Preliminary Lifestyle and Fitness Award | |
| West Virginia | Janet Marie Hill | | | | | | |
| Wisconsin | Mary Alice Fox | | | Interpretive dance | 1st Runner-Up | Preliminary Lifestyle and Fitness Award | |
| Wyoming | Linda Lou Phillips | Laramie | 19 | Vocal & Dance | | | |
