= Miss America 1958 =

31st Miss America pageant

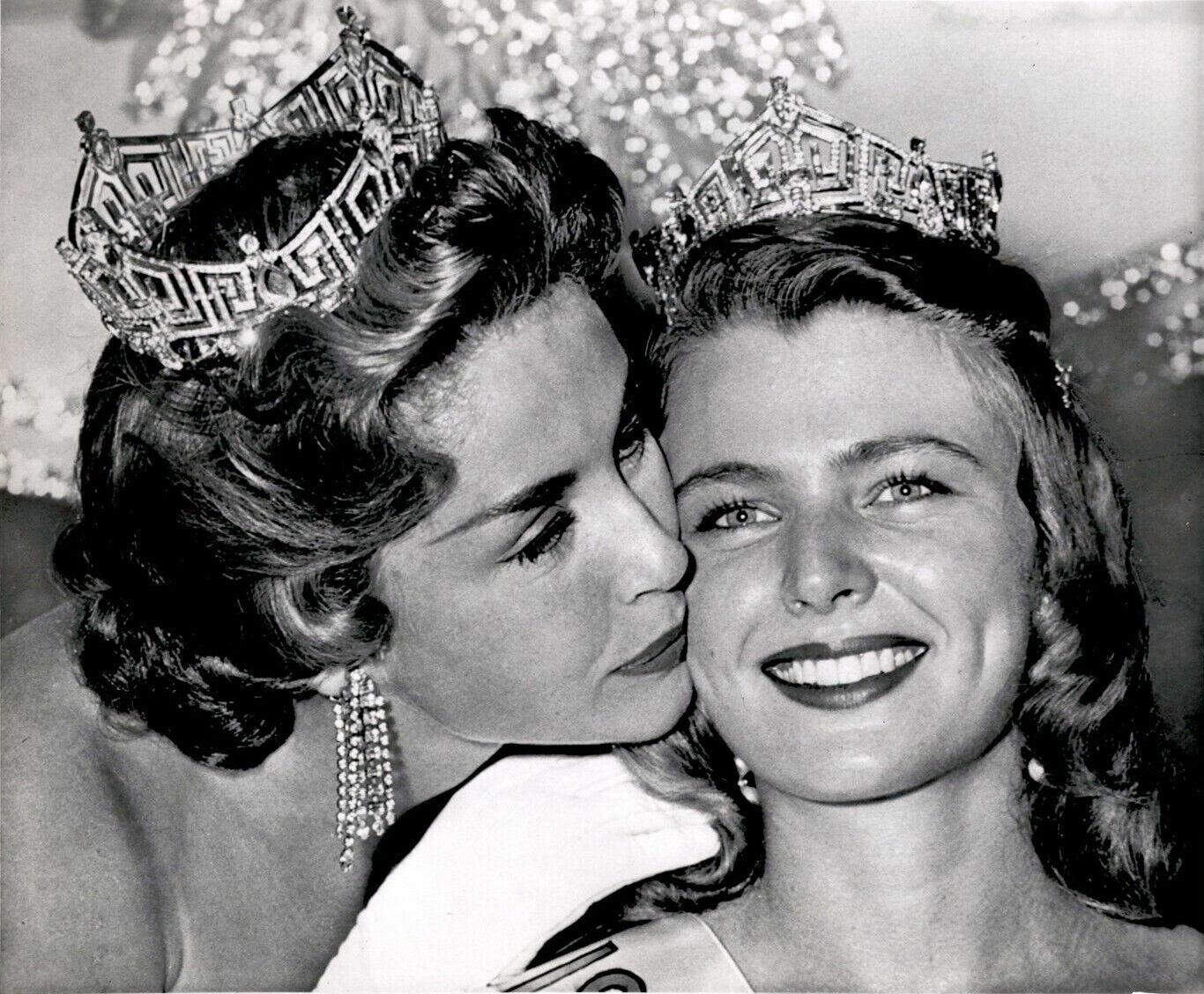
- Former Miss America 1957 Marian McKnight kisses new Miss America 1958 Marilyn Van Derbur upon her victory
- Date: September 7, 1957
- Presenters: Bert Parks
- Venue: Boardwalk Hall, Atlantic City, New Jersey
- Broadcaster: CBS
- Entrants: 51
- Placements: 10
- Winner: Marilyn Van Derbur; Colorado

Miss America 1958, the 31st Miss America pageant, was held at the Boardwalk Hall in Atlantic City, New Jersey on September 7, 1957 on CBS.

The winner, Marilyn Van Derbur, who was a Phi Beta Kappa scholar at the University of Colorado, performed a medley of the songs "Tenderly" and "Tea for Two" on the organ during the talent competition. She later revealed it was the only thing she knew how to play.

== Results ==
=== Placements ===
Placement	Contestant
Miss America 1958	Colorado – Marilyn Van Derbur
1st Runner-Up	Georgia – Jody Shattuck
2nd Runner-Up	Oklahoma – Nancy Denner
3rd Runner-Up	California – Lorna M. Anderson
4th Runner-Up	Florida – Dorothy Maria Steiner
Top 10	Arizona – Lynn Freyse; Missouri – Sara Cooper; Nevada – Loni Gravelle; North Carolina – Elaine Herndon; Oregon – Judith Hansen

=== Awards ===
==== Preliminary awards ====
Awards	Contestant
Lifestyle and Fitness	Arizona - Lynn Freyse; (Georgia (U.S. state)) Georgia - Jody Shattuck; North Carolina - Elaine Herndon
Talent	Indiana - Gloria Ruth Rupprecht; Missouri - Sara Cooper; Oregon - Judith Hansen (tie); Pennsylvania - Jennie Rebecca Blatchford (tie)

==== Other awards ====
Awards	Contestant
Miss Congeniality	New Mexico - Glynnelle Hubbard
Non-finalist Talent	Alabama - Anna Stange; Connecticut - Susan Lightbown; Idaho - Carene Clark; Kentucky - Jane Brock; Nebraska - Catherine "Kay" Nielson; Utah - Francine Louise Felt; Vermont - Joan Hewitt

== Contestants ==
State	Name	Hometown	Age	Talent	Placement	Awards	Notes
Alabama	Anna Stange	Birmingham	20	Monologue from Mourning Becomes Electra		Non-finalist Talent Award	
Arizona	Lynn Freyse	Tucson	20	Dramatic Reading from The Country Girl	Top 10	Preliminary Lifestyle & Fitness Award	Later starred in the TV series Hazel
Arkansas	Suzanne Scudder	Hot Springs	18	Vocal			
California	Lorna Anderson	Sacramento	18	Accordion, "Dark Eyes"	3rd runner-up		
Canada	Joan May Fitzpatrick	Windsor	20	Dramatic Reading			
Chicago	Bette Lieb	Chicago	18	Dramatic Monologue from Romeo and Juliet			
Colorado	Marilyn Van Derbur	Denver	20	Organ, "Tea for Two" & "Tenderly"	Winner		
Connecticut	Susan Lightbown	Fairfield	18	Vocal, "Wouldn't it be Loverly" from My Fair Lady		Non-finalist Talent Award	
Delaware	Kathleen Ann D'Attillio	Wilimington	19	Piano			
(Washington, D.C.) District of Columbia	June Cook	Arlington, VA	20	Piano, "Rhapsody in Blue"			
Florida	Dorothy Maria Steiner	Boca Raton	20	Dramatic Reading, "Such is Your Heritage"	4th runner-up		
(Georgia (U.S. state)) Georgia	Jody Shattuck	Atlanta	20	Vocal & Dance, "Namely You" from Li'l Abner	1st runner-up	Preliminary Lifestyle & Fitness Award	
Hawaii	Sandra Lei Lauhiwa Forsythe	Honolulu	19	Hula			
Idaho	Carene Clark	Pocatello	20	Classical Vocal from Die Fledermaus		Non-finalist Talent Award	
Illinois	Jeannie Beacham	Downers Grove	20	Drama, "The Great Debates"			
Indiana	Gloria Rupprecht	Valparaiso	19	Vocal/Comedy Skit, "My Hero"		Preliminary Talent Award	
Iowa	Carol Fleck	Oskaloosa	19	Dance			
Kansas	Georgiana Rundle	Axtell	21	Vocal, "Habanera" & "Getting to Know You"			
Kentucky	Jane Brock	Liberty	19	Piano		Non-finalist Talent Award	
Louisiana	Beverly Leigh Norman	Shreveport	19	Vocal, "My Own True Love"			
Maine	Carol Ann Bartels	Bath	18	Drama/Art			
Maryland	Nancy Elizabeth Norris	Silver Spring	18	Dramatic Monologue, "A Letter to my Parents"			
Massachusetts	Daly Hirsch	Boston	20	Drama			
Michigan	Valerie Strong	Williamsburg	21	Piano, "Brazil"			
Minnesota	Ardyce Gustafson	St. Paul	18	Vocal Medley from My Fair Lady			
Mississippi	Mary Allen	Yazoo City	19	Dance & Art Presentation			
Missouri	Sara Cooper	Buckner	18	Charleston Dance	Top 10	Preliminary Talent Award	Daughter of Major League Baseball player, Walker Cooper
Nebraska	Catherine "Kay" Nielson	Lincoln	20	Dance		Non-finalist Talent Award	Later Miss Iowa USA 1959
Nevada	Loni Gravelle	Reno	19	Piano, "Piano Concerto in A Minor" by Edvard Grieg	Top 10		
New Hampshire	Holly Arnel	New London	18	Drama			
New Jersey	Janet Ressler	Union	19	Vocal			
New Mexico	Glynnelle Hubbard	Farmington	19	Dance		Miss Congeniality	
(New York (state)) New York	Janet Corrigan	Huntington	21	Vocal, "True Love"			
New York City	Astrid Papamichael	New York City	19	Vocal			
North Carolina	Elaine Herndon	Durham	18	Vocal & Dance	Top 10	Preliminary Lifestyle & Fitness Award	
North Dakota	Helen Winje	Minot	18	Vocal			
Ohio	Linda Hattman	Mansfield	18	Ballet			
Oklahoma	Nancy Denner	Alva	21	Poetry Recitation, "The Ballad of the Harp Weaver" by Edna St. Vincent Millay	2nd runner-up		
Oregon	Judith Hansen	Astoria	19	Classical Vocal, "Mi Chiamano Mimi" from La bohéme	Top 10	Preliminary Talent Award	
Pennsylvania	Jennie Rebecca Blatchford	Hollidaysburg	23	Baton Twirling, "St. Louis Blues" & "The Stars and Stripes Forever"		Preliminary Talent Award	
Puerto Rico	Winnie Rodríguez	Rio Piedras	18	Mexican Hat Dance			
Rhode Island	Beatrice Turek	Providence	20	Art Display			
South Carolina	Cecilia Colvert	Greenwood	19	Pantomime/Vocal, "C'est si bon" by Eartha Kitt			Mother of Miss South Carolina 1988, Anna Graham Reynolds
South Dakota	Patricia Miller	Mobridge	18	Vocal			
Tennessee	Amanda Lee Whitman	Nashville	18	Trampoline/Tumbling, "The Third Man Theme"			Performed the first trampoline talent act in the Miss America competition
Texas	Carolyn Calvert	Austin	18	Monologue from Medea			
Utah	Francine Louise Felt	Salt Lake City	19	Violin		Non-finalist Talent Award	
Vermont	Joan Hewitt	Brattleboro	21	Art Presentation & Original Skit with original music		Non-finalist Talent Award	
Virginia	Rebecca Lee Edmunds	Roanoke	22	Dance			
West Virginia	Janice Sickle	Fairmont	20	Vocal & Dance			
Wisconsin	Joan Hentschel	Wauwatosa	18	Interpretive Dance, "3:00 in the Morning"			
