= Miss Maine =

Beauty pageant competition

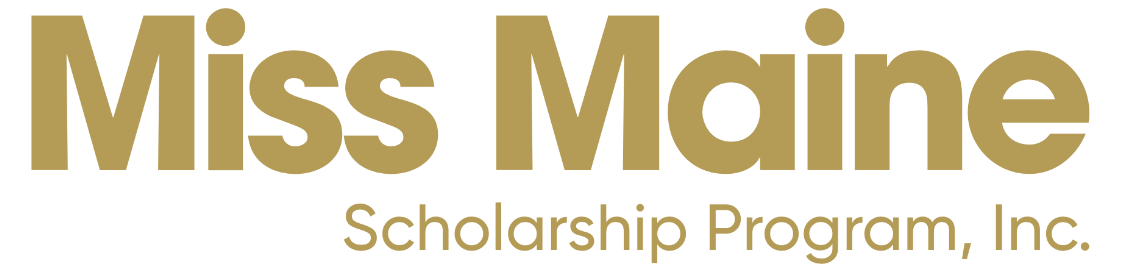
- Formation: 1923
- Type: Beauty pageant
- Headquarters: Portland
- Location: Maine
- Members: Miss America
- Official language: English
- Key people: Sarah Nadeau-Balducci (Executive Director)
- Website: Official website

The Miss Maine competition is the pageant that selects the representative for the state of Maine in the Miss America pageant. Maine has been represented in the pageant since 1937, although the state has never produced a winner.

With Alaska became the latest state crowned the Miss America title, Maine is one of the few states along with South Dakota, West Virginia and Wyoming that has yet to win a Miss America, Miss USA, or Miss Teen USA title.

Ruthie Gusley of Phillips was crowned Miss Maine on June 27, 2026, at the Donald M. Gay Performing Arts Center in Auburn, Maine. She competed for the title of Miss America 2027 on September 6, 2026, at the Kravis Center for the Performing Arts in West Palm Beach, Florida.

== Results summary ==
The following is a visual summary of the past results of Miss Maine titleholders at the national Miss America pageants/competitions. The year in parentheses indicates the year of the national competition during which a placement and/or award was garnered, not the year attached to the contestant's state title.

=== Placements ===
- 2nd runners-up: Karen Johanna Johnson (1971)
- 4th runners-up: Allyn Warner (1972)
- Top 18: Iva Stewart (1933)

=== Awards ===
==== Preliminary awards ====
- Preliminary Talent: Allyn Warner (1972), Veronica Druchniak (2024)

==== Non-finalist awards ====
- Non-finalist Talent: Sally Ann Robinson (1961), Dawn Frances Christie (1962), Marilyn Lash (1973), Laurie Wathen (1988), Elizabeth Edgecomb (2004), Ami Vice (2005), Susie Stauble (2010), Kristin Korda (2014)

==== Other awards ====
- Bernie Wayne Scholarship: Ami Vice (2005)
- Miss Congeniality: Mariah Larocque (2022)

== Winners ==
- Declared as winner
- Ended as a runner-up
- Ended as a finalist or semi-finalist

Year	Name	Hometown	Age	Local Title	Miss America Talent	Placement at Miss America	Special scholarships at Miss America	Notes
2026	Ruthie Gusley	Phillips	19	Miss Franklin County	Acrobatics			
2025	Paige Lessard	Biddeford	24	Miss York County	HerStory			Previously USA National Miss Maine Teen 2019; Previously 2021 National Elite Miss
2024	Jennie Daley	Sullivan	28	Miss Downeast	HerStory: I Want to Be An Engineer			
2023	Veronica Druchniak	Standish	27		Aerial Acrobatics		Preliminary Talent Award	
2022	Madison Leslie	Lewiston	22	—	Vocal, "Bohemian Rhapsody" by Queen			Previously Miss Maine's Outstanding Teen 2016
2021	Mariah Larocque	Portland	25	Miss Sunrise County	Vocal, "I Have Nothing" by Whitney Houston	Withdrew before the final competition due to COVID-19 rules		
2021	Mariah Larocque	Portland	25	Miss Sunrise County	Vocal, "I Have Nothing" by Whitney Houston		Miss Congeniality	
2019–20	Carolyn Brady	Brunswick	22	-	Violin, "Roundtable Rival" by Lindsey Stirling			First African American to win title 4th runner-up at Miss Maine USA 2017 pageant
2018	Olivia Mayo	Minot	20		Vocal, "Send In the Clowns"			
2017	Katie Elliott	Scarborough	22		Vocal, "Someone to Watch Over Me"			Previously Miss Maine's Outstanding Teen 2013
2016	Marybeth Noonan	Raymond	20		Vocal, "I Got Rhythm" from Girl Crazy			Previously Miss Maine's Outstanding Teen 2010 Contestant at National Sweetheart 2015 pageant
2015	Kelsey Earley	Lebanon	24	Miss York Harbor	Clogging, "Happy" by C2C			Contestant at National Sweetheart 2012 pageant
2014	Audrey Thames	Topsham	19	Miss Topsham	Comedic Monologue, "Yma Dream" by Thomas Meehan			
2013	Kristin Korda	Saco	21	Miss Casco Bay	Vocal, "Finding Wonderland"		Non-finalist Talent Award	Previously Miss Maine's Outstanding Teen 2009
2012	Molly Bouchard	Caribou	21	Miss Northern Aroostook	Classical Vocal, "Quando m'en vò" from La bohème			Previously Maine's Junior Miss 2008
2011	Julia Furtado	Dayton	19	Miss Seacoast	Vocal, "Over the Rainbow"			
2010	Arikka Knights	Chester	24	Miss Greater Lincoln	Tap Dance, "Jumpin' Jack"			Contestant at National Sweetheart 2007 pageant
2009	Susie Stauble	Gray	22		Vocal, "Stand Up for Love"		Non-finalist Talent Award	
2008	Adrienne Watkinson	Topsham	23	Miss Topsham	Violin			
2007	Tara Allain	Waterville	22	Miss Kennebec County	Dance, "Hangin' By a Thread"			
2006	Karissa Staples	Biddeford	19	Miss Greater Portland	Vocal, "Take Me or Leave Me" from Rent			
2005	Megan Beals	Ludlow	22	Miss Houlton	Vocal, "Johnny One Note"			
2004	Ami Vice	Lisbon Falls	23		Classical Vocal, "Chi Il Bel Sogno di Doretta" from La rondine		Bernie Wayne Scholarship Non-finalist Talent Award	
2003	Elizabeth Edgecomb	Limestone	20		Classical Piano, Fantaisie-Impromptu		Non-finalist Talent Award	
2002	Rachel Wadsworth	Hiram	20	Miss Forest City	Rhythm Tap Dance			Contestant at National Sweetheart 2001 pageant
2001	Meranda Hafford	Washburn	20	Miss Northern Aroostook	Vocal, "Next Time I Love"			
2000	Renee Belanger	Washburn	22	Miss Northern Aroostook	Jazz Dance, "Jet Prologue" from West Side Story			
1999	Rebecca Pelkey	Howland	21	Miss Greater Portland	Character Ballet, "Can-can"			
1998	Stephany Stanley	Canton	20	Miss Southeast	Acro-Jazz Dance, "The Stampede!" from The Lion King			Contestant at National Sweetheart 1997 pageant
1997	Rachel Binder	Presque Isle	23	Miss Aroostook County	Lyrical Ballet. "Seasons of Love"			
1996	Sarah Nadeau	Portland	20	Miss Greater Portland	Classical Vocal, "Addio" from La bohème			
1995	Sharon Pelletier	Madawaska	23	Miss Greater Portland	Popular Vocal, "At This Moment"			
1994	Victoria Reynolds	Bangor	22	Miss Cumberland County	Tap Dance			
1993	Josette Huntress	Limestone	21	Miss Northern Maine	Piano			
1992	Christina Jane Lasso	Augusta	23	Miss Central Maine	Classical Vocal, "Una Voce Poco Fa" from The Barber of Seville			
1991	Dorie Noble	South Portland	25	Miss Cumberland County	Comedic Monologue, "Yma Dream" by Thomas Meehan			
1990	Ann Rowe	Auburn	26	Miss Greater Portland	Vocal, "Bring Him Home" from Les Misérables			
1989	Jane Brochu	Augusta	25	Miss Augusta	Vocal, "Stormy Weather"			
1988	Lisa Kent	Gorham	21	Miss Cumberland County	Gymnastics / Jazz Dance			
1987	Laurie Wathen	Fort Fairfield	25	Miss Northern Aroostook	Piano, "Symphony No. 9" by Ludwig van Beethoven		Non-finalist Talent Award	
1986	Victoria Reed	Falmouth	26	Miss Windjammer	Vocal, "Can't Help Lovin' Dat Man"			
1985	Mary Margaret Nightingale	Fort Fairfield	20	Miss Southern Aroostook	Vocal, "The Blue Danube"			
1984	Lisa Johnson	South Portland	22	Miss Cumberland County	Electric Violin			
1983	Brenda Theriault	Presque Isle	22	Miss Southern Aroostook	Vocal, "Won't You Come Home Bill Bailey"			
1982	Rebecca Beck	Brunswick	21	Miss Bangor	Classical Vocal, "Adele's Laughing Song" from Die Fledermaus			
1981	Kathleen Jarrell	Orr's Island	19	Miss Windjammer	Vocal Medley, "Swanee", "My Mammy", & "I'm Happy"			
1980	Valerie Crooker	Brunswick	24	Miss Brunswick	Vocal / Dance			Previously Miss Maine USA 1979
1979	Jill O'Brien	Bangor	22	Miss Bangor	Ballet, "Irish Suite"			
1978	Linda Carroll	Alfred	22	Miss Maine Mall	Semi-classical Vocal, "I Could Have Danced All Night" from My Fair Lady			
1977	Terry Gilpatrick	Lincoln	18	Miss Lincoln	Pantomime, "Me and My Shadow"			
1976	Susan Wanbaugh	Presque Isle	19	Miss Maine Potato Queen	Dramatic Monologue from As You Like It			
1975	Patricia Cyr	Madawaska	18	Miss Maine Potato Queen	Vocal, "Cabaret"			
1974	Margaret Ann Welch	Bangor	22	Miss Greater Bangor	Vocal, "Killing Me Softly with His Song"			
1973	Carlene Quimby	Auburn	20	Miss University of Maine	Vocal, "I Cain't Say No" from Oklahoma!			
1972	Marilyn Lash	Friendship	19	Miss University of Maine	Semi-classical Vocal, "Poor Wand'ring One" from The Pirates of Penzance		Non-finalist Talent Award	
1971	Allyn Warner	Falmouth	21	Miss Greater Portland	Semi-classical Vocal, "Mira" from Carnival	4th runner-up	Preliminary Talent Award	
1970	Karen Johanna Johnson	Cumberland Foreside	20	Miss Greater Portland	Classical Vocal, "Quando me'n vo'"	2nd runner-up		
1969	Kirsten Elizabeth Bell	Caribou	18	Miss Caribou	Piano, Theme from The Apartment			
1968	Brenda Renee Verceles	Bangor	19	Miss Bangor	Tap Dance, "Step to the Rear" from How Now, Dow Jones			
1967	Linda Christine Livanda	Cape Elizabeth	19	Miss Cape Elizabeth	Original Recitation & Dance, "Dance of the Decades"			
1966	Mary Kathryn Gonya	Millinocket	20	Miss Millinocket	Recitation			
1965	Ellen Margaret Fowler	Old Orchard Beach	19	Miss Gorham State Teachers' College	Vocal / Dance, "Some People"			
1964	Ellen Warren	Kennebunk	18		Vocal / Dance			
1963	Elaine Ann Ouillette	Lewiston		Miss Lewiston	Musical Variety Act			
1962	Barbara Jean Orr	Portland	19	Miss Livermore Falls	Vocal, "I Wanna Be Loved by You"			
1961	Dawne Frances Christie	Gray	21	Miss Scarborough	Piano, "Hungarian Rhapsody No. 11"		Non-finalist Talent Award	
1960	Sally Ann Robinson	Enfield	20	Miss Lincoln	Monologue / Piano		Non-finalist Talent Award	
1959	Linda Dorothy Ann Mills	Lewiston	18		Dramatic Reading			
1958	Terry Suzanne Tripp	Lewiston			Ballet			
1957	Carol Ann Bartels	Bath			Drama / Art			
1956	Mary Ellen Sanborn	Gardiner			Drama			
1955	Janice Vaughn	Waterville			Dramatic Monologue			
1954	Mary Ellen St. John	Old Town			Drama			
1953	Karen Diane Thorsell	Portland			Vocal			
1952	Norma Lee Collins	Caribou						
1951	Beverly Ann Emery	Auburn			Classical Vocal from The Student Prince			
1950	Jane Harragan	Millinocket			Dramatic Monologue, "The Corn Is Green"			
1949	Connie Marie Gingras	Augusta	21		Fencing			
1948	Muriel Applebee	Enfield						
1947	No Maine representative at Miss America pageant							
1946	No Maine representative at Miss America pageant							
1945	Virginia Trask	Portland	18		Vocal, "I Should Care"			
1944	No Maine representative at Miss America pageant							
1943	Eleanor Fournier	Westbrook						
1942	No Maine representative at Miss America pageant							
1941	No Maine representative at Miss America pageant							
1940	Shirley Edith Houston	Augusta						
1939	No Maine representative at Miss America pageant							
1938	Doris Marie Bergeron	Lewiston						
1937	Cornelia Campbell	South Portland						
1936	Edna Smith	Portland		Miss Portland				Multiple Maine representatives Competed under local title at Miss America pageant
1936	Dolly Stewart	Rockland						Multiple Maine representatives Competed under local title at Miss America pageant
1935	Edith Lucresa Smith							
1934	No national pageant was held							
1933	Iva Stewart		19		N/A	Top 18		
1932	No national pageants were held							
1931	No national pageants were held							
1930	No national pageants were held							
1929	No national pageants were held							
1928	No national pageants were held							
1924–1927	No Maine representative at Miss America pageant							
1923	Winona Evelyn Drew	Portland		Miss Portland	N/A			
1922	No Maine representative at Miss America pageant							
1921	No Maine representative at Miss America pageant							

== Controversies ==
In 2015, pageant contestant Marisa Butler attracted controversy for her volunteer role catching and tagging sharks with the National Oceanic and Atmospheric Administration. Butler was staging bikini shot pictures after dragging sharks onto the beach to be tagged - a practice considered by experts to be harmful. Butler responded to the criticism on Facebook, writing: "I am working towards spreading awareness and changing public opinion about sharks."
