= Marilyn Van Derbur =

Miss America pageant holder

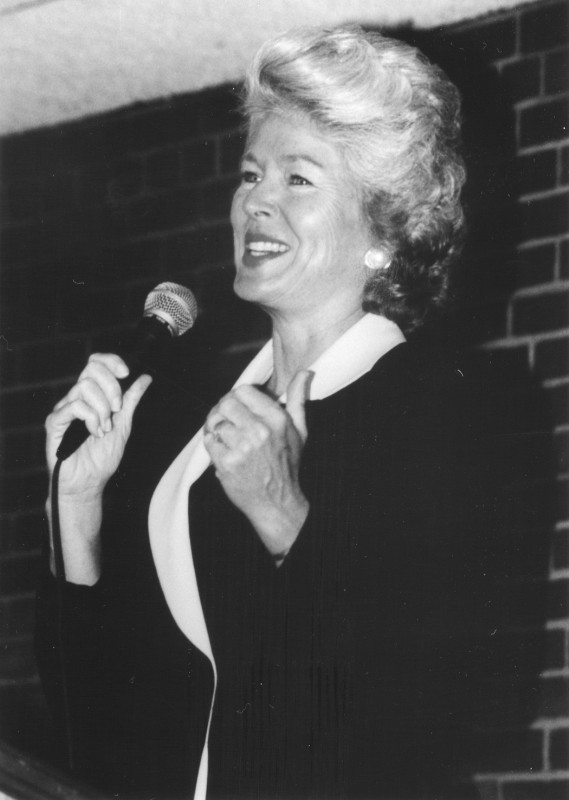
- Van Derbur in 1981
- Born: Marilyn Elaine Van Derbur; June 16, 1937 (age 89); Denver, Colorado, U.S.
- Education: University of Colorado Boulder
- Title: Miss University of Colorado 1957; Miss Colorado 1957; Miss America 1958
- Term: September 7, 1957 - September 6, 1958
- Predecessor: Marian McKnight
- Successor: Mary Ann Mobley
- Spouses: Gary Nady (m. 1961; div. 1962) Lawrence Atler (m. 1964)
- Children: 1

Marilyn Elaine Van Derbur (born June 16, 1937) is an American author, motivational speaker, and beauty pageant titleholder.

In July 1957, she was crowned Miss Colorado 1957. On September 7, 1957, she was crowned Miss America 1958 in Atlantic City, New Jersey, by the outgoing Miss America 1957, Marian McKnight.

== Biography ==
=== Early life and education ===
Marilyn Van Derbur was born on June 16, 1937, in Denver, Colorado, the youngest of four daughters to a family in the Denver mortuary business. (The lighted cross on Mount Lindo southwest of Denver was built so Van Derbur's grandmother could see her husband's final resting place from her home in Park Hill.) She attended East High School, graduating in 1955, and the University of Colorado Boulder, where she earned a degree in English literature with Phi Beta Kappa honors in 1960.

=== Pageantry ===
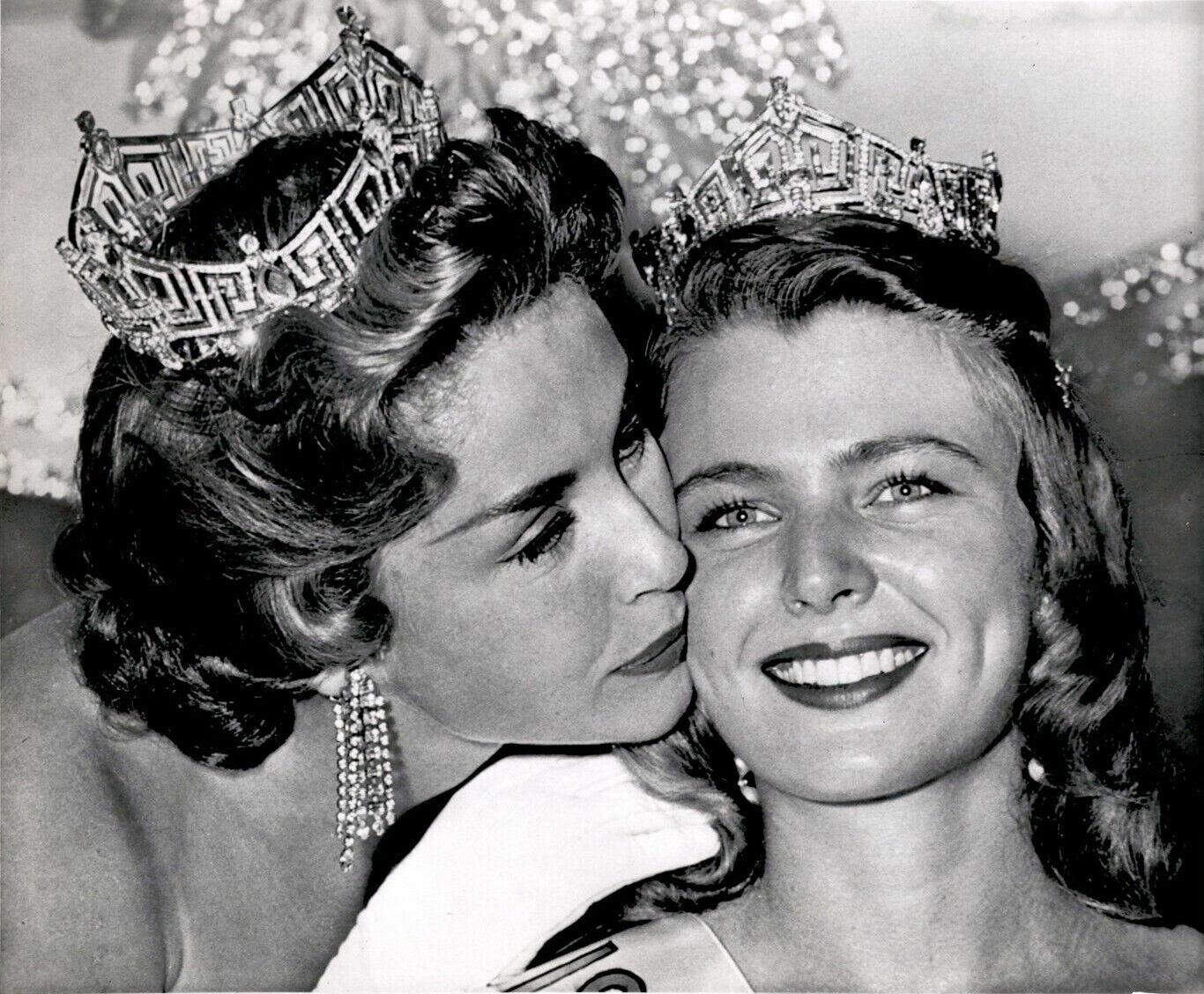
Former Miss America 1957 Marian McKnight kisses Van Derbur upon her Miss America 1958 victory

During her sophomore year of college, Van Derbur was nominated to represent Pi Beta Phi in the Miss University of Colorado pageant. After being crowned Miss University of Colorado in May 1957, she competed in and was crowned Miss Colorado in July 1957. On September 7, 1957, she was crowned Miss America 1958 in Atlantic City, New Jersey.

=== Career ===
After graduation, she moved to New York City where she was the television spokeswoman for AT&T's The Bell Telephone Hour and hosted 10 episodes of Candid Camera. She was the television hostess for the Miss America Pageant for five years.

Van Derbur worked as a public speaker throughout her career. She established the Marilyn Van Derbur Motivational Institute in 1975, where she produced a series of 30-minute motivational films shown at business meetings and conventions.

When Van Derbur was 53, she revealed that she had experienced child incestuous abuse from age 5 to 18, perpetrated by her father. Her story was featured on the cover of People magazine in June 1991. She and her husband provided initial funding for an adult incest survivor program at The Kempe Center, and she founded the Survivors United Network.

=== Marriage and children ===
Following a brief marriage in 1961 to former University of Colorado football player Gary Nady, Van Derbur married her high school boyfriend Lawrence "Larry" Atler in 1964. The couple has a daughter, Jennifer.

=== Legacy ===
In 2021, Van Derbur announced she would be auctioning her Miss America crown and bracelet to benefit Denver Public Schools.

== Published works ==
- Miss America By Day (Oak Hill Ridge Press, 2003)

== Discography ==
- Miss America Marilyn Van Derbur At The Hammond Organ (1958)

== Recognition ==
- 1955: Seventeen's Miss Young America
- 1957: Miss Colorado
- 1958: Miss America
- 1996: inductee, Colorado Women's Hall of Fame
- 2019: inductee, Colorado Authors Hall of Fame

Awards and achievements
Preceded by Marian McKnight	Miss America; 1958	Succeeded by Mary Ann Mobley
Preceded by Polly Childs	Miss Colorado; 1957	Succeeded by Cynthia Cullen
