= Iva Stewart =

American actress

- Born: January 15, 1914
- Died: March 6, 1985 (aged 71)
- Other name: Iva Barbara Stewart
- Occupations: Actress, Model
- Years active: 1937–1940 (film)

Iva Stewart (1914–1985) was an American model and film actress. She was Miss Maine, and competed in Miss America 1933.

Stewart moved to Hollywood where she had a mixture of supporting roles and more minor appearances in glamorous roles in studio films. Amongst her appearances was in the 20th Century Fox series film Mr. Moto Takes a Vacation.

== Filmography ==
Year	Title	Role	Notes
1937	Thin Ice	Member of Girls Band	Uncredited
1938	The Baroness and the Butler	Lady at Charity Party	Uncredited
1938	Kentucky Moonshine	Telephone Operator	Uncredited
1938	Safety in Numbers	Toni Stewart	
1938	Three Blind Mice	Biltmore Cigarette Girl	Uncredited
1938	Always Goodbye	Flower Girl	Uncredited
1938	Sharpshooters	Secretary	Uncredited
1939	The Three Musketeers	Girl Waving at the End	Uncredited
1939	Wife, Husband and Friend	Miss Carver's Secretary	
1939	Boy Friend	Blonde	Uncredited
1939	It Could Happen to You	Minor Role	Uncredited
1939	Second Fiddle	Stewardess	Uncredited
1939	Mr. Moto Takes a Vacation	Susan French	
1939	Hollywood Cavalcade	Girl with Michael at Anniversary Party	Uncredited
1939	20,000 Men a Year	Stewardess	Uncredited
1940	High School	Stewardess	Uncredited
1940	Little Old New York	Mrs. Irving	Uncredited
1940	Free, Blonde and 21	Telephone Operator	Uncredited
1940	Star Dust	Hotel Clerk's Wife	Uncredited
1940	Girl in 313	Margie, Telephone Operator	
1940	Young People	Soubrette	Uncredited, (final film role)

== Bibliography ==
- Youngkin, Stephen. The Lost One: A Life of Peter Lorre. University Press of Kentucky, 2005.
