= Robert M. Fomon =

- Born: January 3, 1925; Chicago, Illinois, U.S.
- Died: May 31, 2000 (aged 75); Palm Beach, Florida, U.S.
- Education: University of Southern California
- Occupation: Stockbroker
- Board member of: E. F. Hutton & Co., New York Stock Exchange, Pacific Stock Exchange, SEC National Market Advisory Board, USC Graduate School of Business Administration, Thayer School of Engineering (Trustee)
- Spouses: Marilyn Quaintance; Sharon Kay Ritchie; Daphne Lewis Ashley Widener
- Children: 2
- Awards: USC Alumni Award for Business Excellence

Robert Michael Fomon (January 3, 1925 – May 31, 2000) was an American financier who was Chairman and Chief Executive Officer of E. F. Hutton & Co. from 1970 to 1987, a governor of the New York Stock Exchange, and Chairman of the Board of Governors of the Pacific Stock Exchange.

Born in Chicago, Illinois, after the early death of his mother, Robert Fomon and his older brother Samuel spent their childhood with relatives in Appleton, Wisconsin, where they attended high school. Robert went on to graduate from the University of Southern California and in 1951 went to work in the corporate finance department of the Los Angeles office of E. F. Hutton & Co.

== Personal life ==
Robert Fomon was first married in 1954 to Marilyn Quaintance with whom he had two children. Divorced, he married for a second time in 1975 to Sharon Kay Ritchie, Miss America of 1956. That marriage too ended in divorce and in 1989 he married Daphne Lewis Ashley Widener, the ex-wife of Widener family member, Peter A. B. Widener III.

While living in California in the 1960s, Robert Fomon became involved in the sport of Thoroughbred horse racing. He notably owned in partnership the colt Inclusive, winner of the 1963 Texas Derby at Sunland Racetrack in Sunland Park, New Mexico, and the 1964 San Luis Rey Handicap at Santa Anita Park in Arcadia.

== Head of E. F. Hutton & Co. ==
Fomon joined E. F. Hutton in 1951, eventually rising to head of corporate finance. In 1970, he was named chairman and CEO of Hutton as a compromise candidate and relocated to its headquarters in Manhattan, New York. During his tenure, Fomon oversaw the sale of Hutton shares to the public and listing on the New York Stock exchange, and the creation of its famous advertising slogan, "When E. F. Hutton talks, people listen." The May 6, 1987 New York Times wrote that his leadership "helped build the retail-oriented brokerage house into one of the industry's most successful during a difficult era on Wall Street." Robert Fomon also recognized the potential dangers of mergers in the financial industry and advised the Republican administration of President Nixon that he believed there was a fundamental conflict of interest in the case of money management firms and brokerage houses and the two should operate as independent entities.

=== Business scandal and resignation ===
In 1984 the United States Attorney for the Middle District of Pennsylvania opened a federal criminal probe into an E. F. Hutton check-overdrafting scheme that operated between 1980 and 1982 and which earned the company millions of dollars in illegal gains. As a result, the company's reputation was severely tarnished and it began losing clients which quickly led to financial difficulties. In December 1986, the company pleaded guilty to 2,000 felony counts, but neither Robert Fomon or any Hutton executives were charged. In early 1987, Hutton's Board of Directors forced Robert Fomon to step down as head of the company.

E. F. Hutton & Co. never recovered from the damage the scandal caused and in 1988 it was acquired by Shearson Lehman Brothers .

Robert Fomon died following a heart attack at a Palm Beach, Florida, hospital on May 31, 2000, at age seventy-five.
