= Miss USA 2018 =

67th Miss USA pageant

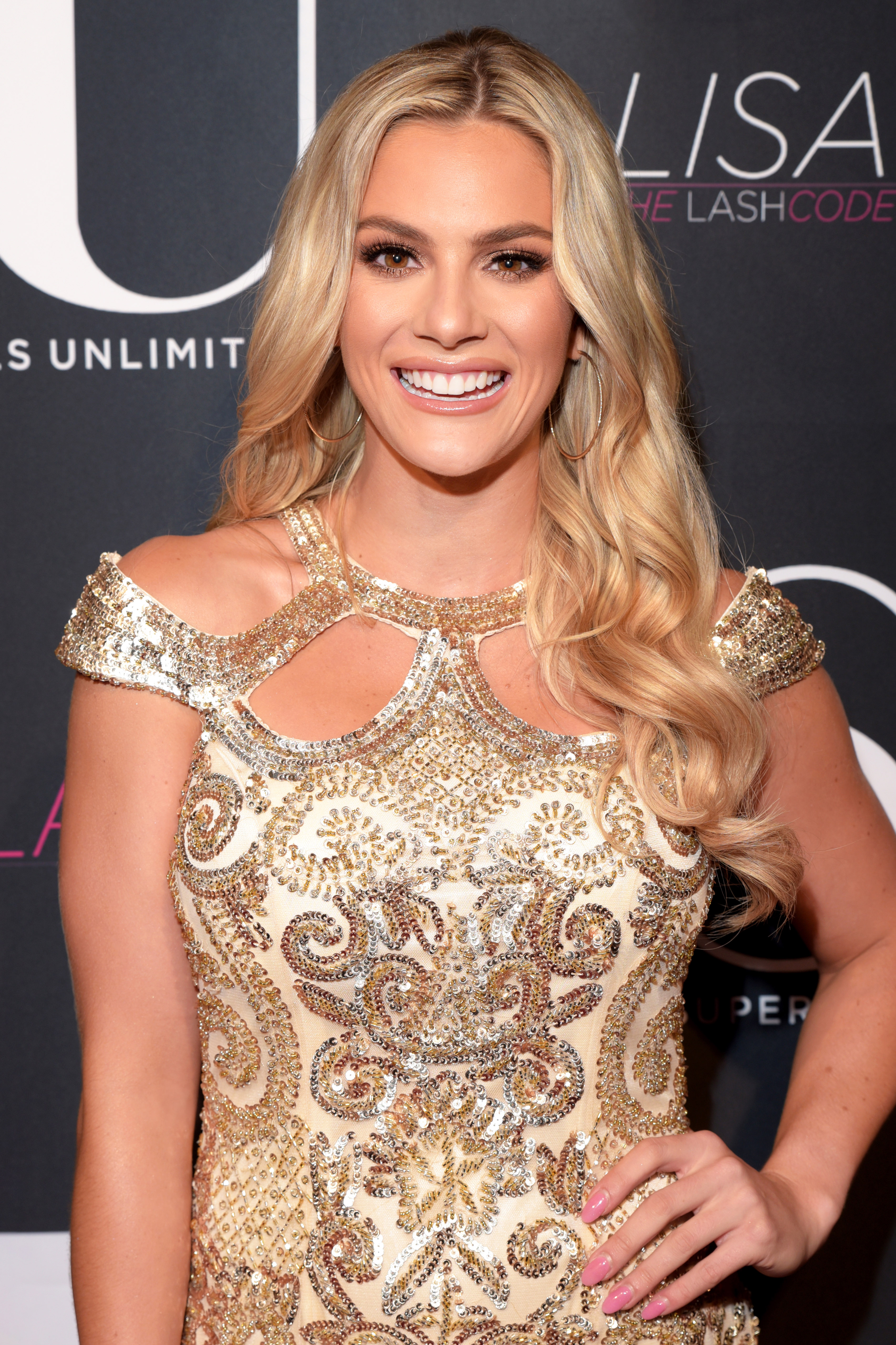
- Sarah Rose Summers
- Date: May 21, 2018
- Presenters: Nick Lachey; Vanessa Lachey; Carson Kressley; Lu Sierra
- Entertainment: 98 Degrees; Lee Brice
- Venue: Hirsch Memorial Coliseum, Shreveport, Louisiana
- Broadcaster: Fox (KMSS-TV); Azteca
- Entrants: 51
- Placements: 15
- Winner: Sarah Rose Summers; Nebraska
- Congeniality: Callie Bishop; Wyoming

Miss USA 2018 was the 67th Miss USA pageant. It was held on May 21, 2018, at the Hirsch Memorial Coliseum in Shreveport, Louisiana. The pageant was held at the same venue that was used for Miss USA 1997.

Kára McCullough of District of Columbia crowned her successor Sarah Rose Summers of Nebraska at the end of the event, becoming the first woman from her state to win the title. Summers represented the United States at the Miss Universe 2018 pageant on December 17, 2018, in Bangkok, and placed in the Top 20.

Nick Lachey and Vanessa Lachey hosted for the first time, while Carson Kressley and Lu Sierra served as commentators and was broadcast on Fox for the third consecutive year. Additionally, it featured performances by 98 Degrees and Lee Brice.

For the first time, the Miss Teen USA 2018 pageant was held concurrently, with the finals of the Teen competition being held just prior to the Miss USA competition.

== Background ==
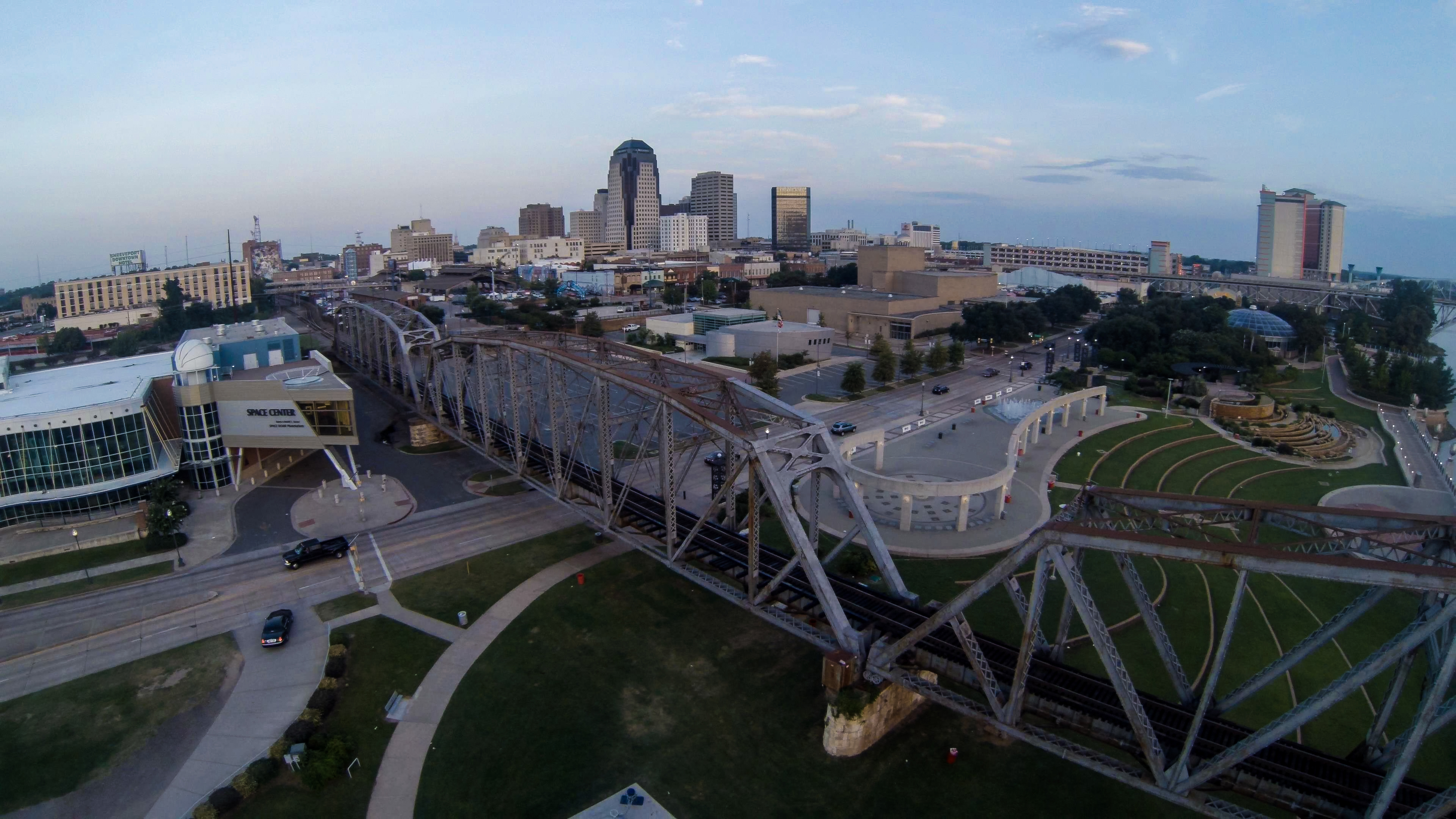
Shreveport, Louisiana, the host city of Miss USA 2018 competition.

=== Location ===
On March 19, 2018, the Miss Universe Organization (MUO) confirmed that the pageant would be held on May 21 at the Hirsch Memorial Coliseum in Shreveport, Louisiana, this was the fifth time Louisiana hosting the pageant, and Shreveport was hosted twice, in 1997 and 1998.

=== Hosts and performer ===
On March 19, 2018, it was announced husband and wife duo Nick Lachey and Vanessa Lachey would be hosting the event, while Carson Kressley and Lu Sierra would serve as backstage commentators. Nick Lachey is one of the members of boy band 98 Degrees, while Vanessa Lachey formerly was crowned Miss Teen USA 1998 as Vanessa Minnillo, and has worked as a presenter in Total Request Live and a correspondent in Entertainment Tonight.

On May 17, 2018, the aforementioned 98 Degrees and country singer Lee Brice were announced as musical guests.

=== Selection of participants ===
Delegates from 50 states and the District of Columbia were selected in state pageants held between September 2017 and January 2018. Texas was initially to be the first pageant that was originally scheduled on September 3, 2017, but was pushed to January 6, 2018, due to Hurricane Harvey hit that pageant's host city, Houston. However, Illinois was actually the first pageant of the 2018 edition held on September 4, 2017. The final pageants were Kentucky and New Mexico, held on January 28, 2018. Ten of them were former Miss Teen USA state winners, three of them were former Miss America state winners and one was former Miss World Puerto Rico who competed in Miss World 2014.

== Results ==
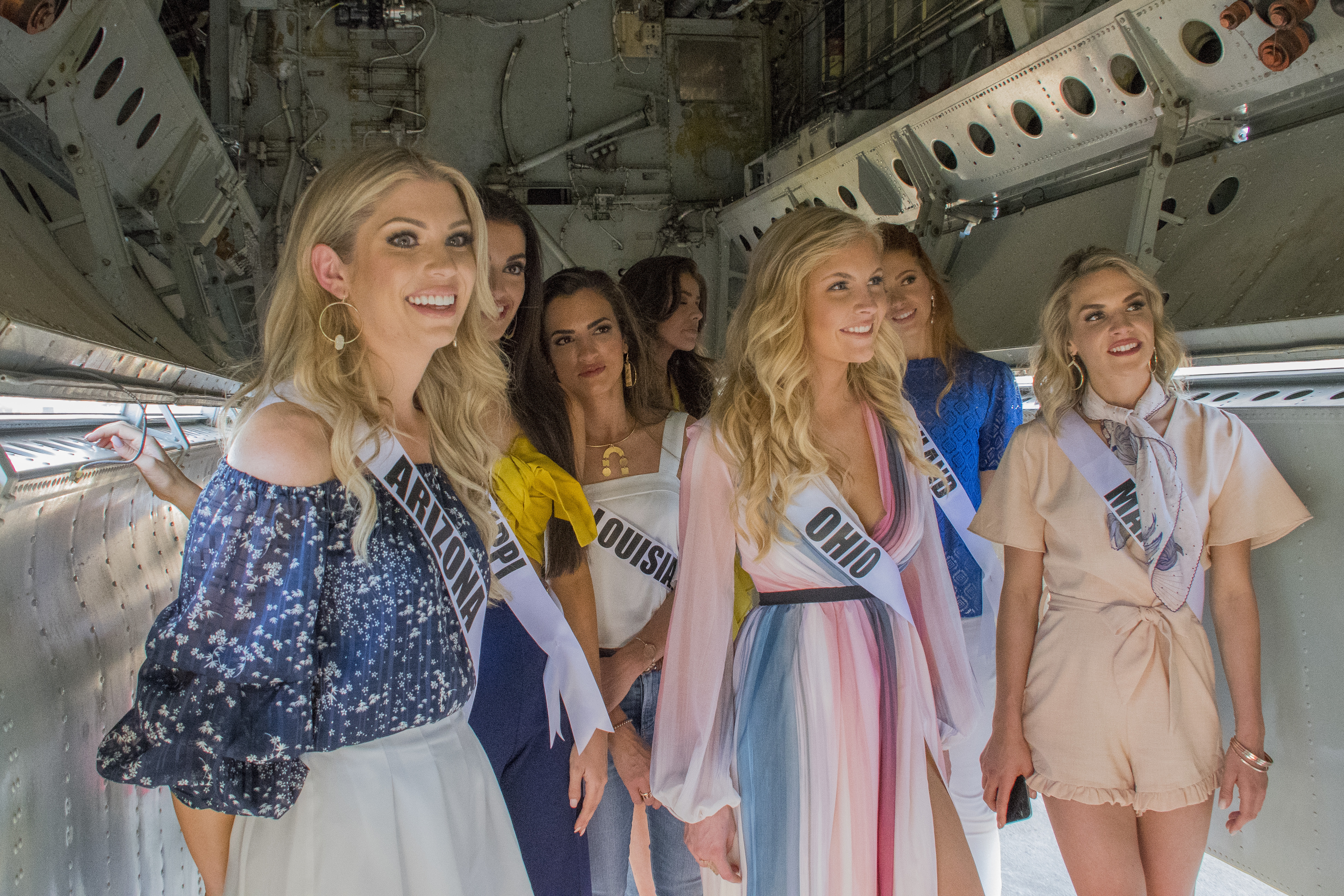

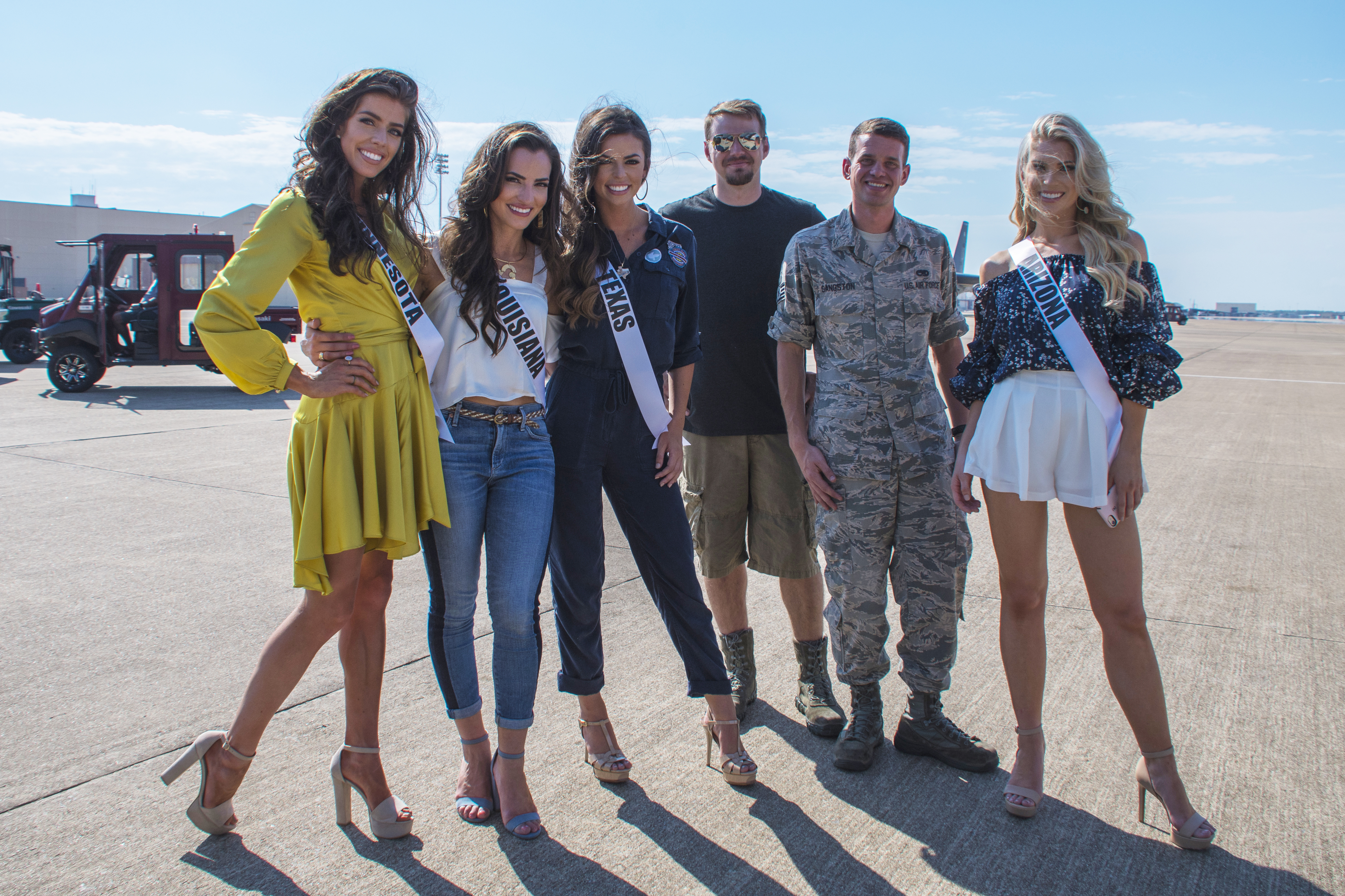
Contestants in the 2018 Miss USA pageant visit Barksdale Air Force Base

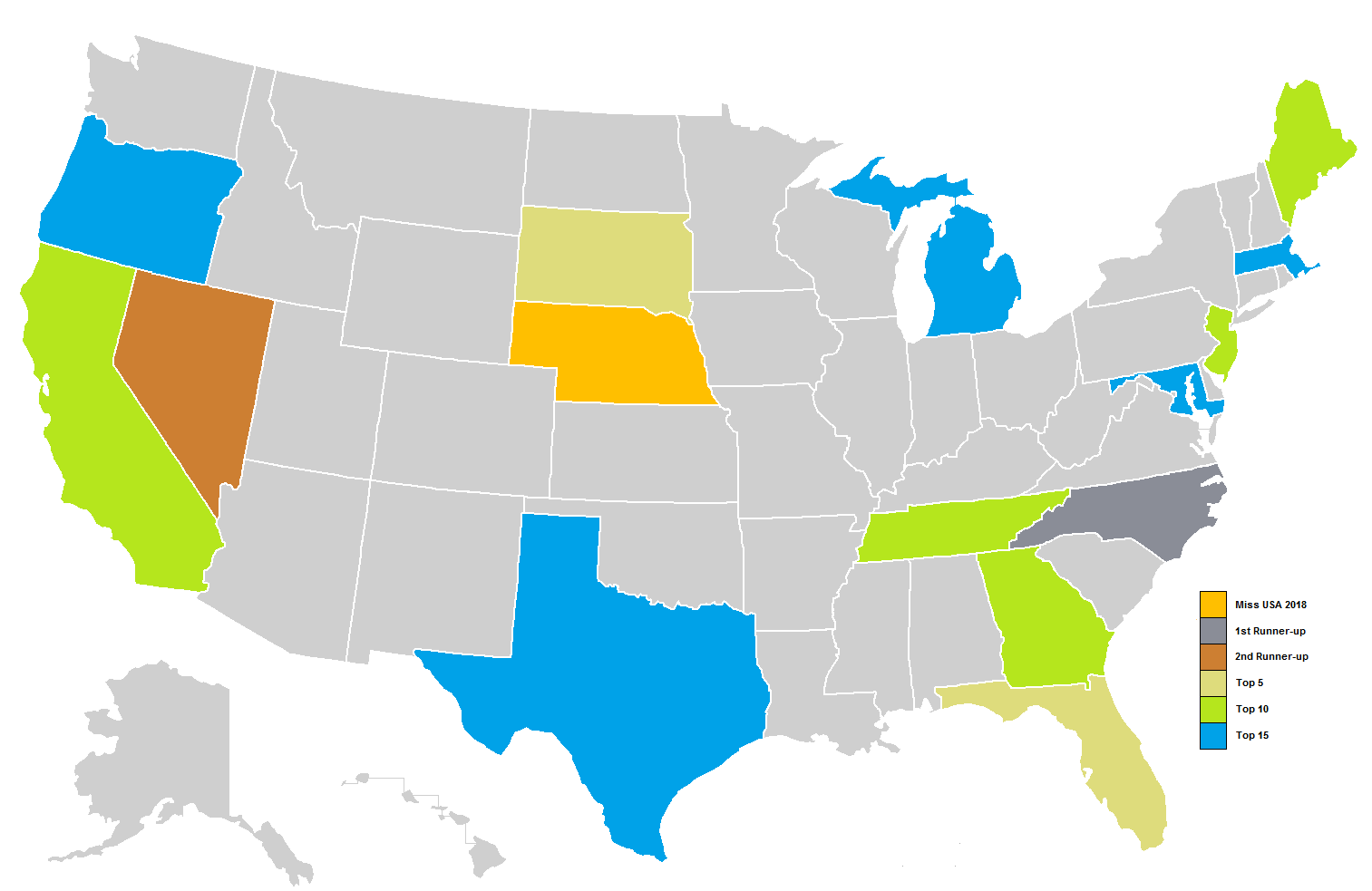
Miss USA 2018 results.

=== Placements ===
| Placement | Contestant |
|---|---|
| Miss USA 2018 | Nebraska – Sarah Rose Summers |
| 1st runner-up | North Carolina – Caelynn Miller-Keyes |
| 2nd runner-up | Nevada – Carolina Urrea |
| Top 5 | Florida – Génesis Dávila; South Dakota – Madison Nipe § |
| Top 10 | California – Kelley Johnson; Georgia – Marianny Egurrola; Maine – Marina Gray; New Jersey – Alexa Noone; Tennessee – Alexandra Harper |
| Top 15 | Maryland – Brittinay Nicolette; Massachusetts – Allissa Latham; Michigan – Elizabeth Johnson; Oregon – Toneata Morgan; Texas – Logan Lester |

§ – Voted into Top 15 by viewers

=== Special award ===
| Award | Winner |
|---|---|
| Miss Congeniality | Wyoming – Callie Bishop |

== Pageant ==
=== Preliminary round ===
Prior to the final competition, the delegates competed in the preliminary competition, which involves private interviews with the judges and a presentation show where they compete in swim wear and evening gown and was held on May 17, hosted by Erin Lim and Kára McCullough.

=== Finals ===
Much like in recent years, the contestants were increased back to 15 semifinalists, from 2016. In the final competition, the top 15 competed in swim wear, while the top 10 also competed in evening gown. The top five also competed in a question round against current affairs, while the final three also competed in the final question round and a final runway, and the winner was decided by a panel of judges alongside the two runners-up.

=== Judges ===
- Natasha Curry – television host, news anchor and Miss Washington USA 1998
- Jamie Kern Lima – businesswoman, reality television personality and Miss Washington USA 2000
- Crystle Stewart – Miss USA 2008 from Texas
- Liliana Vasquez – host and producer
- Denise White – businesswoman and Miss Oregon USA 1994
- Paula Shugart – Chairman of the Miss Universe Organization

== Contestants ==
Contestant stats provided via the Miss Universe Organization.

| State/district | Contestant | Age (Note: Ages at the time of the pageant) | Hometown | Notes |
|---|---|---|---|---|
| Alabama | Hannah Brown | 23 | Tuscaloosa | Contestant on season 23 of The Bachelor; Star of season 15 of The Bachelorette; Winner of season 28 of Dancing with the Stars |
| Alaska | Brooke Johnson | 25 | Anchorage | |
| Arizona | Nicole Smith | 24 | Phoenix | |
| Arkansas | Lauren Weaver | 21 | Greenwood | Previously Miss Arkansas Teen USA 2014 |
| California | Kelley Johnson | 25 | Los Angeles | Previously Miss Colorado 2015 |
| Colorado | Chloe Brown | 22 | Grand Junction | Previously Miss Colorado Teen USA 2013 |
| Connecticut | Jamie Hughes | 27 | Stamford | |
| Delaware | Sierra Wright | 20 | Wilmington | Previously Miss Delaware Teen USA 2015; Contestant on Survivor 47 |
| District of Columbia | Bryce Armstrong | 21 | Washington, D.C. | |
| Florida | Génesis Dávila | 27 | Miami | Previously Miss World Puerto Rico 2014; Originally crowned Miss Florida USA 2017, but was later dethroned |
| Georgia | Marianny Egurrola | 25 | Buford | |
| Hawaii | Julianne Chu | 26 | Honolulu | Previously Miss Hawaii Teen USA 2010; Sister of Allison Chu, Miss Hawaii USA 2021 |
| Idaho | Téa Draganović | 21 | Boise | |
| Illinois | Karolina Jasko | 20 | Franklin Park | |
| Indiana | Darrian Arch | 23 | Chesterton | Previously Miss Indiana Teen USA 2013 |
| Iowa | Jenny Valliere | 27 | Cedar Rapids | |
| Kansas | Melanie Shaner | 20 | Overland Park | Previously Miss Kansas Teen USA 2015 |
| Kentucky | Braea Tilford | 25 | Louisville | |
| Louisiana | Lauren Vizza | 28 | Shreveport | Previously Miss Louisiana 2012 |
| Maine | Marina Gray | 22 | Mount Desert Island | |
| Maryland | Brittinay Nicolette | 26 | Fallston | |
| Massachusetts | Allissa Latham | 27 | Lowell | |
| Michigan | Elizabeth Johnson | 25 | Detroit | |
| Minnesota | Kalie Wright | 25 | Eagle Bend | Previously National Sweetheart 2014; Previously Miss Idaho 2015 |
| Mississippi | Laine Mansour | 21 | Tupelo | |
| Missouri | Tori Kruse | 27 | Camdenton | |
| Montana | Dani Walker | 28 | Billings | Previously National American Miss California Jr. Teen 2006; Previously National American Miss California Teen 2009; Competed in Miss California USA several times. |
| Nebraska | Sarah Rose Summers | 23 | Omaha | Previously National American Miss Junior Teen 2009–10; Previously Miss Nebraska Teen USA 2012 |
| Nevada | Carolina Urrea | 23 | Sunrise Manor | Contestant in Nuestra Belleza Latina 2013 and 2015 |
| New Hampshire | Michelle McEwan | 25 | Harrisville | |
| New Jersey | Alexa Noone | 23 | Bayonne | |
| New Mexico | Kristen Leyva | 23 | Las Cruces | |
| New York | Genesis Suero | 26 | Brooklyn | |
| North Carolina | Caelynn Miller-Keyes | 22 | Asheville | Previously Miss Virginia Teen USA 2013; Contestant on season 23 of The Bachelor; Contestant on season 6 of Bachelor in Paradise |
| North Dakota | Abigail Pogatshnik | 20 | Bismarck | |
| Ohio | Deneen Penn | 20 | Cortland | |
| Oklahoma | Cheyene Darling | 20 | Edmond | |
| Oregon | Toneata Morgan | 21 | Coquille | |
| Pennsylvania | Olivia Suchko | 22 | Belle Vernon | |
| Rhode Island | Daescia DeMoranville | 22 | Johnston | |
| South Carolina | Tori Sizemore | 22 | Anderson | Previously Miss South Carolina Teen USA 2013 |
| South Dakota | Madison Nipe | 21 | Madison | |
| Tennessee | Alexandra Harper | 25 | Brentwood | Daughter of Miss Tennessee USA 1981, Sharon Kay Steakly |
| Texas | Logan Lester | 23 | Houston | |
| Utah | Narine Ishhanov | 24 | Salt Lake City | Originally from Turkmenistan |
| Vermont | Maia-Jena Allo | 20 | Colchester | |
| Virginia | Ashley Vollrath | 22 | Blacksburg | |
| Washington | Abigail Hill | 20 | Enumclaw | |
| West Virginia | Casey Lassiter | 21 | Spencer | |
| Wisconsin | Regina Gray | 27 | Milwaukee | Later Miss Supranational USA 2019 |
| Wyoming | Callie Bishop | 28 | Laramie | Previously Miss Wyoming Teen USA 2008 |

== International broadcasters ==
=== Television ===
- United States: Fox
- Africa: DSTV Mzansi Magic (delayed broadcast)
- Asia-Pacific: Fox Life (delayed broadcast)
- Venezuela: Venevisión
