= Tara Allain =

American beauty pageant competitor

- Born: Tara Allain; October 2, 1985 (age 41); Worcester, Massachusetts, U.S.
- Beauty pageant titleholder
- Title: Miss Maine 2007
- Major competition: Miss America 2008

Tara Allain (born October 2, 1985) is Miss Maine for 2007. She is a 2008 graduate of Colby College.

== Early life ==
Allain is the daughter of Kathleen and Daniel Allain of Worcester, Massachusetts. She is a graduate of Saint Peter-Marian High School. She majored in biology at Colby College.

== Miss Maine pageant ==
Her platform and charity for the pageant was Habitat for Humanity. In the talent competition, she performed a dance entitled "Hangin' by a Thread".

=== Participation in Maine pageant ===
Allain admits that her participation in the Maine pageant was a calculated maneuver because she did not want to compete in the Massachusetts pageant. She cites that if she won, she would have to take off a year from school which she claims was not the case by participating in the Miss Maine competition.

As Miss Maine, she has visited schools to promote Habitat for Humanity.
