= Jack and the Beanstalk (1967 film) =

- Written by: Larry Markes; Michael Morris
- Directed by: Gene Kelly
- Starring: Gene Kelly; Bobby Riha; Ted Cassidy; Marian McKnight; Marni Nixon; Chris Allen; Dick Beals; Leo DeLyon; Cliff Norton; Janet Waldo
- Music by: Lennie Hayton
- Country of origin: United States
- Original language: English

Production
- Producers: Joseph Barbera; William Hanna; Gene Kelly; Bill Perez; Arthur Pierson
- Cinematography: Hal Mohr
- Editor: Warner E. Leighton
- Running time: 51 minutes
- Production company: Hanna-Barbera Productions

Original release
- Network: NBC
- Release: February 26, 1967

Jack and the Beanstalk is a 1967 live-action/animated-hybrid musical-themed telefilm that was produced and directed by and starred Gene Kelly. It was produced by William Hanna and Joseph Barbera. It is a retelling of the popular fairy tale that mixes both live action and animation. The film premiered on NBC on February 26, 1967.

The songs, written by Sammy Cahn and Jimmy Van Heusen, included "Half-Past April and a Quarter to May", "It's Been Nice", "What Does a Woggle Bird Do?", and "One Starry Moment".

The special won the 1967 Emmy Award for "Outstanding Children's Program".

== Plot ==
The adventure begins when Jack (Bobby Riha) trades his cow for some magic beans from peddler Jeremy Keen (Gene Kelly). The beans sprout a beanstalk high into the clouds, and Jack and Jeremy climb it to discover a giant (voiced by Ted Cassidy), a goose that lays golden eggs, and a singing princess named Serena (voiced by Janet Waldo and sung by Marni Nixon) who is trapped in a harp by a magic spell and can only be released through a kiss.

The film then follows the traditional Jack and the Beanstalk tale where Jeremy and Jack climb down the beanstalk chased by the angry giant. In this account it is Jeremy who chops down the beanstalk, killing the giant.

Jack's mother then invites Jeremy into the house for a cup of tea.

== Cast ==
- Bobby Riha as Jack
  - Dick Beals as Jack (singing voice)
- Gene Kelly as Jeremy Keen, Proprietor
- Ted Cassidy as The Giant
- Marian McKnight as Jack's Mother/Serena
- Janet Waldo as Princess Serena
  - Marni Nixon as Princess Serena (singing voice)
- Chris Allen as Mouse
- Leo DeLyon as Woggle-Bird #1
- Cliff Norton as Woggle-Bird #2
- Don Messick as Cat, Mice (uncredited)
