= Sarah Rose Summers =

American beauty pageant titleholder

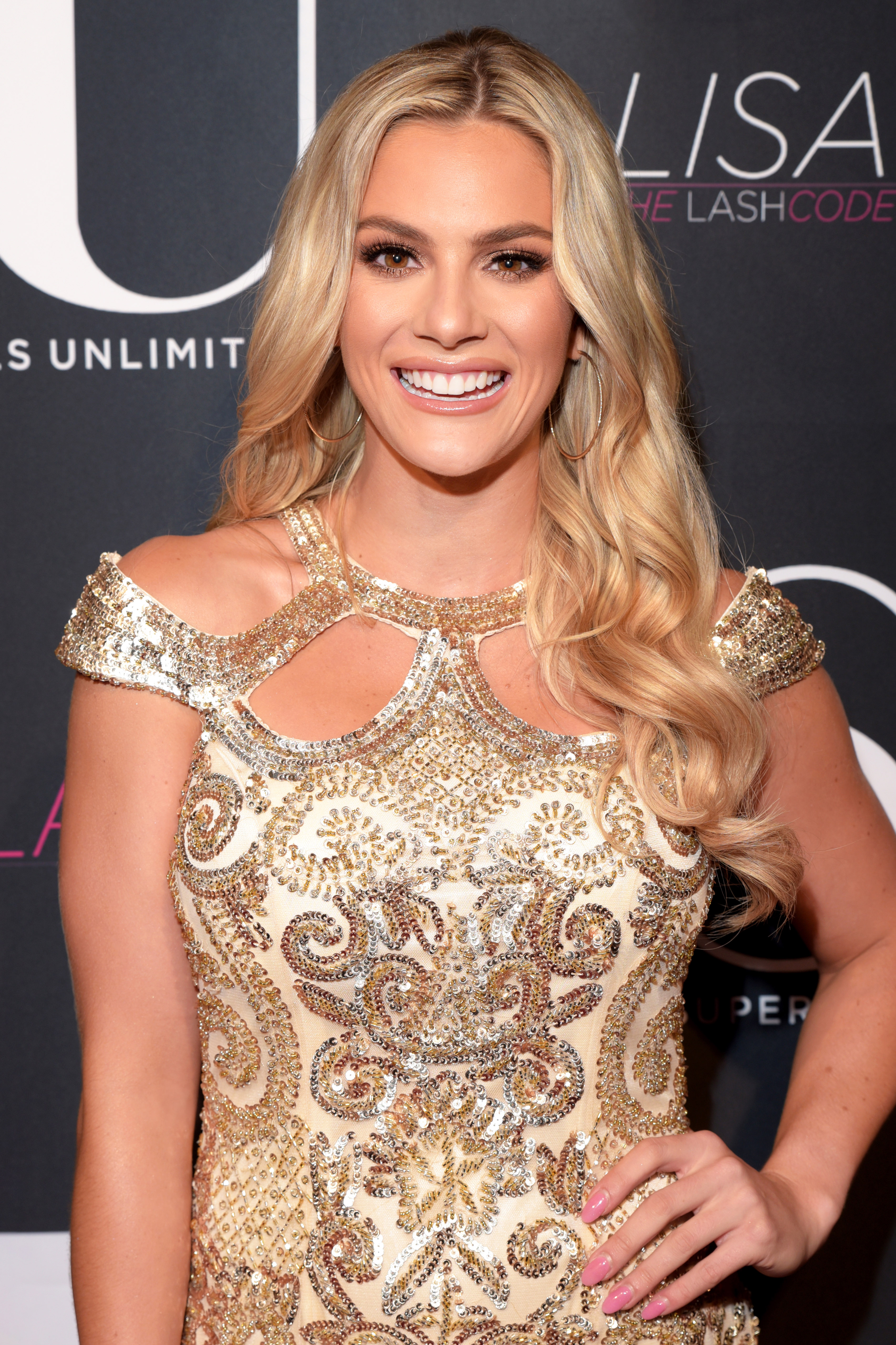
- Summers in 2018
- Born: Omaha, Nebraska, U.S.
- Education: Texas Christian University (BS; BS)
- Spouse: Conner Combs (m. 2019)
- Children: 1
- Beauty pageant titleholder
- Title: Miss Nebraska Teen USA 2012; Miss Nebraska USA 2018; Miss USA 2018
- Major competitions: Miss Nebraska Teen USA 2012; (Winner); Miss Teen USA 2012; (Unplaced); Miss Nebraska USA 2018; (Winner); Miss USA 2018; (Winner); Miss Universe 2018; (Top 20)

Sarah Rose Summers Combs is an American beauty pageant titleholder who won Miss USA 2018. As Miss USA, she represented the United States at Miss Universe 2018, where she reached in the Top 20. Previously, Summers won Miss Nebraska USA 2018 and went on to become the first woman from Nebraska to win the Miss USA title.

== Early life and education ==
Summers was born in Omaha, Nebraska, and grew up in Papillion in the Omaha–Council Bluffs metropolitan area. At four years old, she was hospitalized and diagnosed with idiopathic thrombocytopenic purpura (ITP).

She graduated from Papillion-La Vista South High School, in 2013 and later earned two degrees cum laude from Texas Christian University in 2017 child development and strategic communication, with a minor in business. While a student, she also joined the Zeta Tau Alpha sorority. Summers worked as a certified child life specialist prior to becoming Miss USA.

== Career ==
=== 2004–2019: Pageantry ===
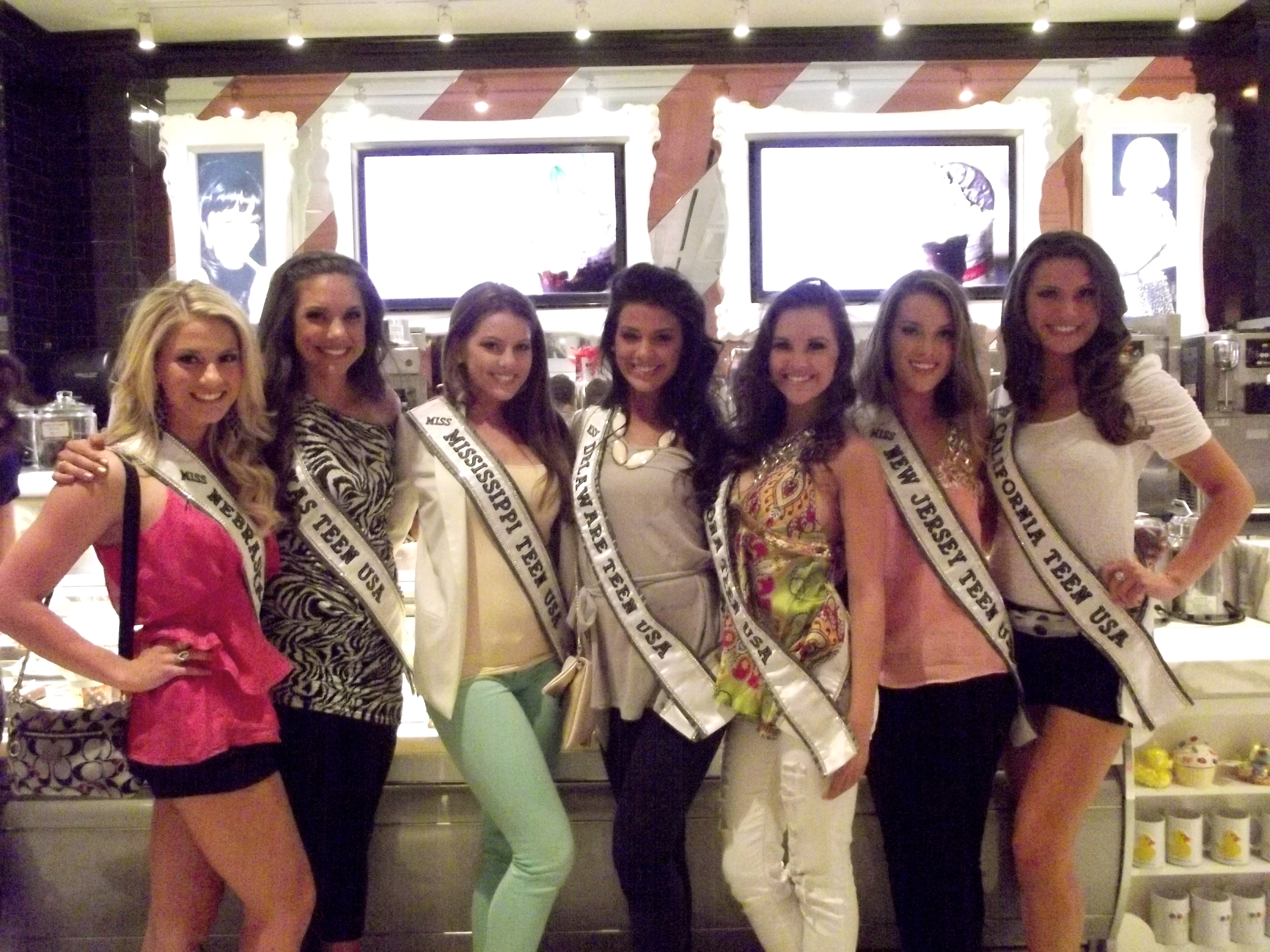
Summers (far left) and other Miss Teen USA 2012 state titleholders at Miss USA 2012 in Las Vegas

Summers began her pageantry career at age ten, having convinced her parents to allow her to compete in pageants when they received a postcard advertisement for a local child beauty pageant. After four years of competing, she won the title of National American Miss Nebraska Junior Teen 2009 and represented Nebraska at the national pageant and was crowned the 2009–2010 National American Miss Junior Teen. In 2012, Summers was crowned Miss Nebraska Teen USA 2012. She represented Nebraska at Miss Teen USA 2012 at Atlantis Paradise Island in Nassau, Bahamas, but was unplaced. At the end of her reign, she crowned Jasmine Fuelberth as her successor. After a hiatus, Summers returned to pageantry and competed in Miss Nebraska USA 2016.

In 2018, Summers was crowned Miss Nebraska USA 2018 by Fuelberth, who was the outgoing titleholder. At Miss Nebraska USA 2018, Summers represented Omaha. After winning Miss Nebraska USA, Summers earned the right to represent Nebraska at Miss USA 2018, held at Hirsch Memorial Coliseum in Shreveport, Louisiana. She won the competition, beating out first runner-up Caelynn Miller-Keyes of North Carolina and second runner-up Carolina Urrea of Nevada, becoming the first woman from Nebraska to win Miss USA.

After winning Miss USA, she crowned Bree Coffey as her Miss Nebraska USA successor; pageant protocol states that the two titles cannot be held coterminously as her new Miss USA duties would have interfered with her duties as Miss Nebraska USA. On September 7, 2019, took part in Sherri Hill's fashion show in New York Fashion Week.

As Miss USA 2018, Summers represented the United States at Miss Universe 2018 in Bangkok Thailand, where she reached the top 20. Her national costume was based on a red rose, the national flower of the United States and Summers's middle name. The winner was Catriona Gray of the Philippines. Summers ended her reign on May 2, 2019, after crowning Cheslie Kryst as Miss USA 2019 in Reno, Nevada.

=== 2020–present: Current projects ===
She hosted a podcast called More Than A Crown from 2019 to 2021.

== Personal life ==
Summers became engaged to longtime boyfriend Conner Combs in Bangkok on December 17, 2018, shortly after competing at Miss Universe 2018. They married on October 20, 2019, in Anthem, Arizona, and now have two children.

== Filmography ==
Television
| Year | Title | Role | Notes |
|---|---|---|---|
| 2018 | Miss USA 2018 | Herself | Television special; Miss Nebraska 2018 |
| 2018–2019 | Celebrity Page | Herself / Special Correspondent | 4 episodes |
| 2019 | Miss USA 2019 | Herself | Television special |

Podcasts
| Year | Title | Role | Notes |
|---|---|---|---|
| 2019–2021 | More Than A Crown | Host | |

Awards and achievements
| Preceded by Madison Novak | Miss Nebraska Teen USA; 2012 | Succeeded by Jasmine Fuelberth |
| Preceded by Jasmine Fuelberth | Miss Nebraska USA; 2018 | Succeeded by Bree Coffey |
| Preceded by Kára McCullough, District of Columbia | Miss USA; 2018 | Succeeded by Cheslie Kryst, North Carolina |
