= John J. Shea Jr. =

American medical doctor, professor and surgeon

- Born: September 4, 1924; Memphis, Tennessee, U.S.
- Died: February 8, 2015 (aged 90); Memphis, Tennessee, U.S.
- Education: University of Notre Dame; Harvard Medical School
- Spouse: Lynda Lee Mead (m. 1964)
- Children: 5
- Scientific career
- Fields: Otology
- Workplaces: Shea Ear Clinic; University of Tennessee; University of Mississippi; University of North Carolina; Tulane University

John Joseph Shea Jr. (September 4, 1924 – February 8, 2015) was an American medical doctor, professor and surgeon.

He attended Christian Brothers High School, Memphis, Tennessee, the University of Notre Dame and Harvard Medical School. He performed the first successful reconstructive stapedectomy in May, 1956. The patient was a 54-year-old housewife with conductive hearing loss so severe that she could no longer hear at all, even with a hearing aid. Shea removed the stapes, covered the oval window opening with a vein graft removed from the back of the patient's hand, and inserted a prosthesis to replace the diseased stapes bone. The patient's hearing was restored and she heard well for the rest of her life. He pioneered numerous techniques in the treatment of hearing loss and dizziness, developed many instruments and prostheses to restore hearing, and worked to advance the knowledge and understanding of the treatment of ear disease.

He was a clinical professor in the Ear, Nose and Throat Departments of the University of Tennessee, the University of Mississippi, the University of North Carolina and Tulane University.

== Family ==
Shea was married (1949) to the former Gwyn Cooke Rainer, 1930-2009 (later Mrs. Shelby Foote), with whom he had two children; then (1964) to the former Lynda Lee Mead (Miss America, 1960), the couple had three children. He died on February 8, 2015.
