= Kelley Johnson =

Miss Colorado 2015

- Born: October 22, 1992 (age 33); Fort Collins, Colorado, U.S.
- Education: Colorado Mesa University; Grand View University (BSN); University of Colorado, Anschutz Medical Campus (MSN)
- Height: 1.89 m (6 ft 2 in)
- Beauty pageant titleholder
- Title: Miss Liberty 2014; Miss Northern Colorado 2015; Miss Colorado 2015; Miss California USA 2018
- Hair color: Blonde
- Eye color: Green
- Major competitions: Miss America 2016 (2nd Runner-Up); Miss USA 2018 (Top 10)

Kelley Elizabeth Johnson (born October 22, 1992) is an American nurse, television host and beauty pageant titleholder. In addition to being a Chief Nurse Advocate, she is also a doctoral student, keynote speaker and national spokeswoman. Kelly Johnson was also crowned Miss Colorado 2015 and placing second runner-up at Miss America 2016. Johnson later won Miss California USA 2018. She placed in the top 10 at Miss USA 2018.

== Early life and education ==
Johnson was born in Fort Collins, Colorado, and spent her later childhood in Windsor, Colorado. Her mother is Julie Johnson Haffner and her stepfather is Gene Haffner. Johnson also has two older sisters. She is a 2010 graduate of Fossil Ridge High School in Fort Collins.

Johnson attended Colorado Mesa University from 2010 through 2012. She is a 2015 graduate of Grand View University where she earned a Bachelor of Science degree in nursing and was the valedictorian of her nursing class. Johnson is a registered nurse.

== Pageant career ==
=== Early pageants ===
On March 30, 2014, while a student at Grand View University in Des Moines, Iowa, Johnson won the Miss Liberty 2014 title. She competed as one of 15 finalists in the 2014 Miss Iowa pageant on a platform of "Raising Awareness About the Importance of Early Cancer Detection" and piano playing as her talent. She was a top-10 finalist for the statewide title.

=== Miss America 2016 ===
In November 2014, returning to her state of origin, Johnson was awarded a crown that allowed her to move on to the next round in the competition. She entered the state pageant at Denver's Ellie Caulkins Opera House in June 2015 as one of 26 qualifiers. Johnson's competition talent was a monologue which was correlated to her experience with a patient she had met with Alzheimer's disease. Her platform is "The Health Initiative PLUS: Prevent, Live, Uncover, Study".

Johnson won the competition on Saturday, June 20, 2015, when she received her crown from outgoing Miss Colorado titleholder Stacey Cook. As Miss Colorado, her activities included public appearances across Colorado.

Johnson was Colorado's representative at the Miss America 2016 pageant in Atlantic City, New Jersey, in September 2015. In the televised finale on September 13, 2015, she performed an original monologue inspired by a patient she encountered as a nurse during the talent portion of the competition. In the interview portion, she was asked what woman should appear on the ten-dollar bill and answered "Ellen DeGeneres". Johnson's personal platform was "The Health Initiative PLUS". She was named second runner-up to Betty Cantrell, Miss Georgia 2015, and awarded a $20,000 scholarship prize.

==== Reactions to nursing monologue ====
On the September 14, 2015 episode of The View, co-hosts Joy Behar and Michelle Collins poked fun at Johnson, a registered nurse, for her Miss America monologue in which she wore a nurse's uniform and stethoscope while speaking about her profession. Their comments sparked a social-media backlash, particularly by nurses, and some advertisers pulled their ads from the show.

On September 17, 2015, Johnson appeared on The Ellen DeGeneres Show to discuss her on-stage question and answer, suggesting DeGeneres should be on the ten-dollar bill and her decision to perform a monologue about nursing for her talent. After her interview, Johnson received $10,000 from Shutterfly to help pay for her tuition for nurse anesthetist school.

=== Miss USA 2018 ===
On December 3, 2017, Johnson was crowned Miss California USA 2018 after representing Redondo Beach in the competition by outgoing titleholder India Williams. She represented California in Miss USA 2018 and placed in the top 10. She was succeeded by Erica Dann at the end of her reign.

Awards and achievements
Preceded by Stacey Cook	Miss Colorado; 2015	Succeeded by Shannon Patilla
Preceded by (Arkansas) Ashton Campbell	Miss America 2nd Runner-Up; 2016	Succeeded by (New York (state)) Camille Sims
Preceded by India Williams	Miss California USA; 2018	Succeeded by Erica Dann
