= Girl in 313 =

1940 film

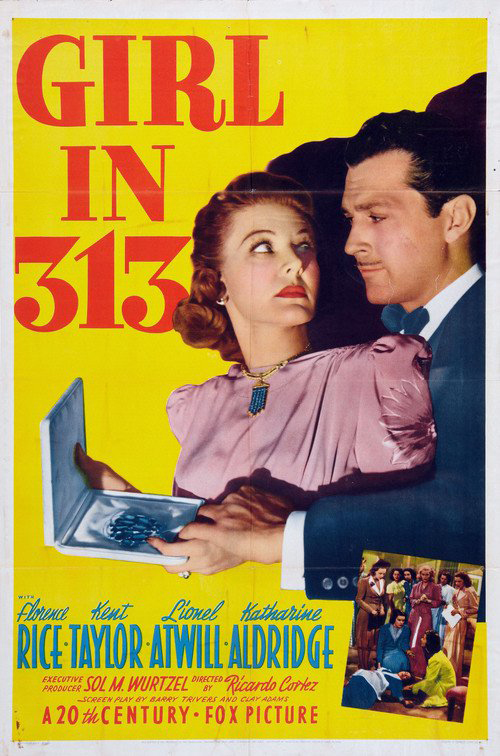
- Theatrical release poster
- Directed by: Ricardo Cortez
- Screenplay by: Barry Trivers; M. Clay Adams
- Story by: Hilda Stone
- Produced by: Sol M. Wurtzel
- Starring: Florence Rice; Kent Taylor; Lionel Atwill; Kay Aldridge; Mary Treen; Jack Carson
- Cinematography: Edward Cronjager
- Edited by: Louis R. Loeffler
- Music by: David Buttolph; Cyril J. Mockridge
- Production company: 20th Century Fox
- Distributed by: 20th Century Fox
- Release date: May 31, 1940
- Running time: 56 minutes
- Country: United States
- Language: English

Girl in 313 is a 1940 American drama film directed by Ricardo Cortez and written by Barry Trivers and M. Clay Adams. The film stars Florence Rice, Kent Taylor, Lionel Atwill, Kay Aldridge, Mary Treen and Jack Carson. The film was released on May 31, 1940, by 20th Century Fox.

== Plot ==
Police agent Joan Matthews goes undercover in a gang of jewel thieves and when about to find who the evildoers are, she falls in love with one of the thieves.

== Cast ==
- Florence Rice as Joan Matthews
- Kent Taylor as Gregg Dunn
- Lionel Atwill as Russell aka Henry Woodruff
- Kay Aldridge as Sarah Sorrell
- Mary Treen as Jenny
- Jack Carson as Police Lt. Pat O'Farrell
- Elyse Knox as Judith Wilson
- Joan Valerie as Francine Edwards
- Dorothy Dearing as Emmy Lou Bentley
- Dorothy Moore as Happy
- Julie Bishop as Lorna Hobart
- Charles C. Wilson as Vincent Brady
- William B. Davidson as George Grayson
- Lenita Lane as Mrs. Whitman
- Lillian Porter as Page Girl
- Alice Armand as Clerk
- Gladys Costello as Assistant Clerk
- Adrian Morris as First Detective
- Lee Phelps as Second Detective
- Charles Williams as Henry
- Evalyn Knapp as Arrested Girl
- Pat O'Malley as Bartender
- James Flavin as Det. Carvin
- Ralph Dunn as Det. Berner
- Eddy Chandler as Cop
- Rex Evans as Corday
- Iris Wong as Chinese Model
- Laura Treadwell as Mrs. Jamison
- Grace Hayle as Mrs. Hudson
- Edward Cooper as Butler
- Billy Wayne as Cab Driver
- Mantan Moreland as Porter
- Iva Stewart as Margie
- Florence Wright as Secretary
