= Lynda Lee Mead =

American beauty pageant contestant

Lynda Mead Shea
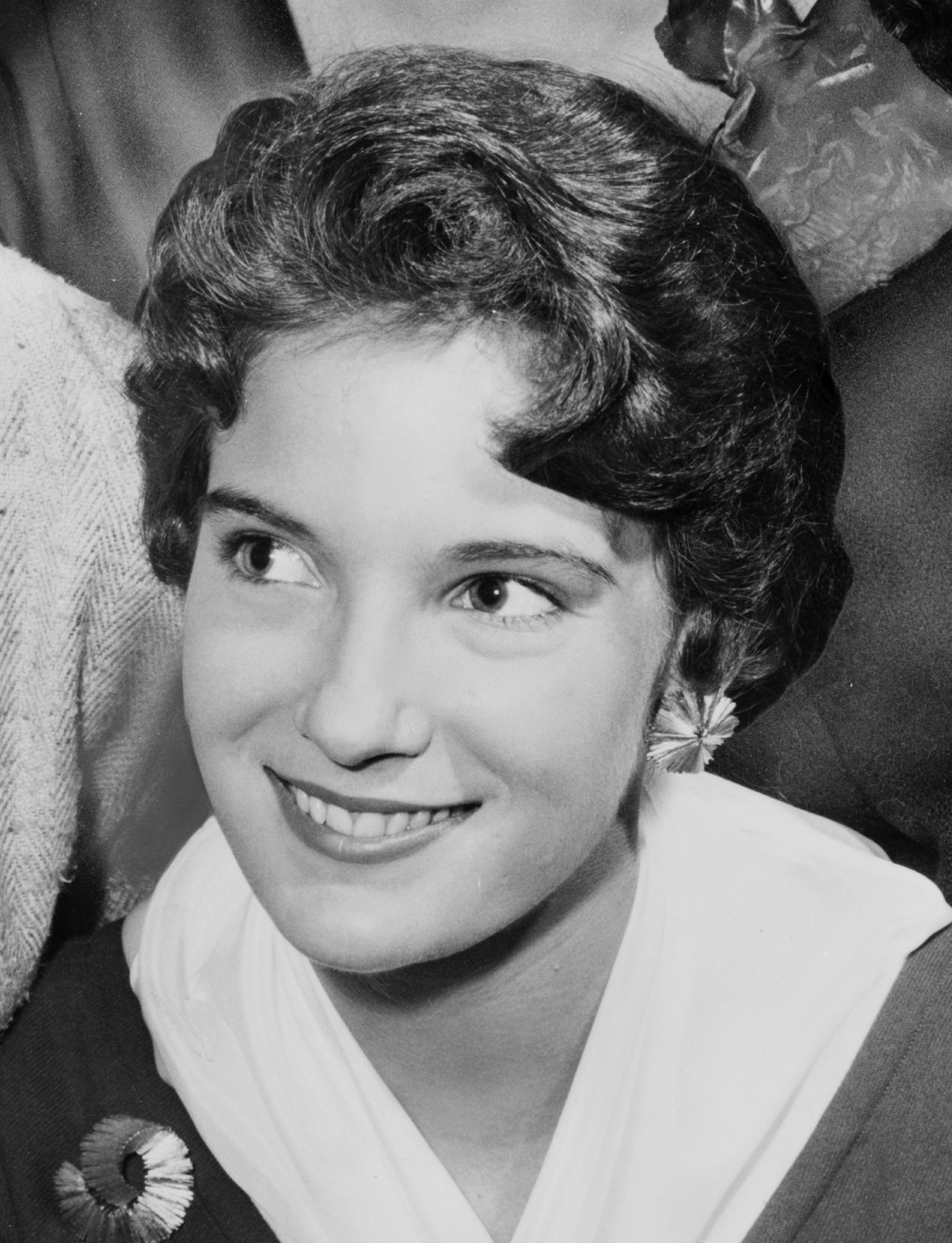
- Lynda Lee Mead in 1960
- Born: April 17, 1939 (age 87); Natchez, Mississippi, U.S.
- Education: University of Mississippi
- Occupation: Businesswoman
- Title: Miss America 1960
- Predecessor: Mary Ann Mobley
- Successor: Nancy Fleming
- Spouse: John J. Shea Jr. (m. 1964; died 2015)
- Children: 5

Lynda Lee Shea (née Mead; born April 17, 1939) is an American businesswoman and beauty pageant titleholder who was Miss Mississippi 1959 and Miss America 1960. Shea attended Natchez High School and the University of Mississippi, where she was a member of Chi Omega sorority. Her immediate predecessor as Miss America, Mary Ann Mobley (the first Miss America from Mississippi), was Mead's sorority sister at Chi Omega.

== Family ==
Mead married Dr. John J. Shea Jr. in 1964; they have three adult children. Dr. Shea died in 2015.

== Business life ==
Shea is president of Shea Design & French Country Imports in Memphis, Tennessee.

Awards and achievements
Preceded by Mary Ann Mobley	Miss America; 1960	Succeeded by Nancy Fleming
Preceded by Margie Wilson	Miss Mississippi; 1959	Succeeded by Betty Porter
