= Miss America 1957 =

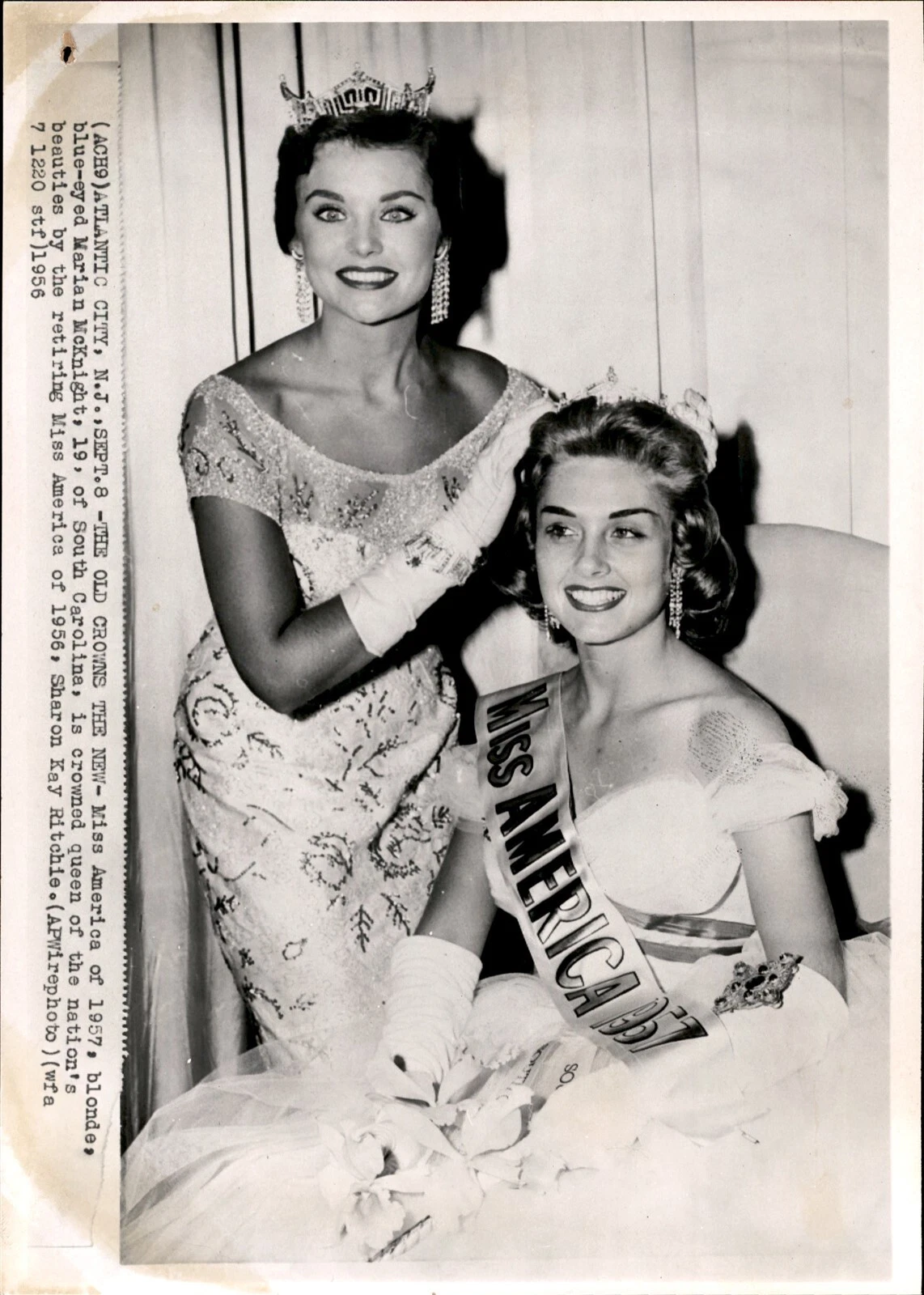
- Marian McKnight being crowned Miss America 1957 by Sharon Ritchie
- Date: September 8, 1956
- Presenters: Bert Parks
- Venue: Boardwalk Hall, Atlantic City, New Jersey
- Broadcaster: ABC
- Entrants: 50
- Placements: 10
- Winner: Marian McKnight; South Carolina

Miss America 1957, the 30th Miss America pageant, was held at the Boardwalk Hall in Atlantic City, New Jersey on September 8, 1956, on ABC.

Marian McKnight became the first Miss South Carolina to take the crown. She was crowned by Miss America 1956, Sharon Kay Ritchie.

== Results ==
=== Placements ===
Placement	Contestant
Miss America 1957	South Carolina – Marian McKnight
1st Runner-Up	District of Columbia – Margo Lucey
2nd Runner-Up	Alabama – Anne Ariail
3rd Runners-Up (tie)	Arizona – Barbara Patricia Hilgenberg; Kansas – Mary Ann McGrew
Top 10	California – Joan Colleen Beckett; Canada – Dorothy Germaine Moreau; Chicago – Sandra Jean Stuart; Hawaii – Jere Wright; Massachusetts – Jewel Frast Smerage

=== Awards ===
==== Preliminary awards ====
Awards	Contestant
Lifestyle and Fitness	California - Joan Colleen Beckett; Hawaii - Jere Wright; Chicago - Sandra Jean Stuart
Talent	Alabama - Anne Ariail; Arkansas - Barbara Banks; Nebraska - Diane Knotek

==== Other awards ====
Awards	Contestant
Miss Congeniality	Vermont - Sandra Simpson
Non-finalist Talent	Iowa - Martha Barsness; Louisiana - Bobbie Chachere; Michigan - Shirley Swanson; Nebraska - Diane Knotek; Pennsylvania - Lorna Ringler; Virginia - Rebecca Richardson; Wisconsin - Lynn Byron Holden
