= Kelsey Earley =

American beauty pageant titleholder

- Born: September 12, 1991 (age 35)
- Education: University of New England
- Beauty pageant titleholder
- Title: Miss Sanford Region 2010; Miss Southern Coast 2011; Miss Sanford Region 2012; Miss Southern Coast 2013; Miss York County Coast 2014; Miss York Harbor 2015; Miss Maine 2015
- Major competition: Miss America 2016

Kelsey Earley (born September 12, 1991) is an American beauty pageant titleholder from Lebanon, Maine, who was crowned Miss Maine 2015. She competed for the Miss America 2016 title in September 2015.

== Pageant career ==
=== Early pageants ===
Earley competed in the 2010 Miss Maine pageant as Miss Sanford Region with the platform "Self-Esteem" and a clogging performance in the talent portion of the competition. She was not a finalist for the state title and received a $300 scholarship prize. She competed in the 2011 Miss Maine pageant as Miss Southern Coast with the platform "Literacy: Read-Pass It On" and a clogging performance in the talent portion of the competition. She was not a top finalist for the state title.

Earley competed in the 2012 Miss Maine pageant as Miss Sanford Region with the platform "Literacy: Healthy Minds and Body" and a contemporary clogging performance in the talent portion of the competition. She was named second runner-up to winner Molly Bouchard.

Earley competed in the 2013 Miss Maine pageant as Miss Southern Coast with the platform "Literacy Matters" and a clogging performance in the talent portion of the competition. She was named was third runner-up to winner Kristin Korda. Earley also earned the Talent Award and an additional $1,000 scholarship along with the Miss America Community Service Award. She competed in the 2014 Miss Maine pageant as Miss York County Coast with the platform "Be A Superhero: Volunteer" and a clogging performance in the talent portion of the competition. She was not a top finalist for the state title.

=== Miss Maine 2015 ===
Earley entered the Miss Maine pageant in April 2015 as Miss York Harbor, one of 7 qualifiers for the state title. Earley's competition talent was clogging. Her platform is "Be a Superhero" for which Earley hand-sews superhero capes for patients at Barbara Bush Children's Hospital in Portland, Maine.

Earley won the competition at Catherine McAuley High School in Portland, Maine, on Sunday, April 26, 2015, when she received her crown from outgoing Miss Maine titleholder Audrey Thames. She earned several thousand dollars in scholarship money and other prizes from the state pageant. As Miss Maine, her activities include public appearances across the state of Maine.

=== Vying for Miss America 2016 ===
Earley was Maine's representative at the Miss America 2016 pageant in Atlantic City, New Jersey, in September 2015. In the televised finale on September 13, 2015, she placed outside the Top 15 semi-finalists and was eliminated from competition. She was awarded a $3,000 scholarship prize as her state's representative.

== Early life and education ==
Earley is a native of Lebanon, Maine, and a 2009 graduate of Noble High School in North Berwick, Maine. Earley is a student at the University of New England where she studies dental hygiene.

Awards and achievements
Preceded by Audrey Thames	Miss Maine; 2015	Succeeded by Marybeth Noonan
