= Marian McKnight =

American actress, model, and 1957 Miss America

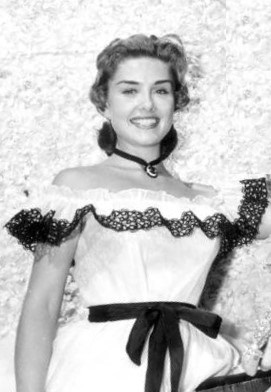
- McKnight at 1957 Florida Products Festival
- Occupations: Actress, model
- Title: Miss America 1957
- Predecessor: Sharon Ritchie
- Successor: Marilyn Van Derbur
- Spouse: Gary Conway (m. 1958)
- Children: 2

Marian McKnight is an American actress, model and former beauty pageant winner. She was crowned Miss America in 1957.

== Pageantry ==
She earned the 1957 Miss America title with a Marilyn Monroe act in the talent portion. She later worked with Monroe's ex-husband, Joe DiMaggio, for a Virginia supplier of military bases. Despite the contention of Monroe biographer Donald Spoto, McKnight denied that she and DiMaggio were romantically involved.

== Career ==
In 1967, McKnight played Jack's mother in Hanna-Barbera's live action version of Jack and the Beanstalk, an Emmy Award-winning film directed by Gene Kelly, in which he also appeared as Jeremy the Peddler. Her voice was dubbed by Janet Waldo so she would sound as well as resemble the animated Princess Serena.

She appeared in an episode of The Love Boat in 1984, along with Jean Bartel, Miss America 1943; Nancy Fleming, Miss America 1961; and Vanessa L. Williams, Miss America 1984.

== Personal life ==
McKnight married actor Gary Conway in 1958 after meeting at UCLA. They have two children (Gareth and Kathleen).

McKnight and Conway were the former owners of Carmody McKnight winery.

Awards and achievements
Preceded by Sharon Ritchie	Miss America; 1957	Succeeded by Marilyn Van Derbur
Preceded by Martha Chestnut	Miss South Carolina; 1956	Succeeded by Cecilia Colvert
