= Mary Ann Mobley =

American actress (1937–2014)

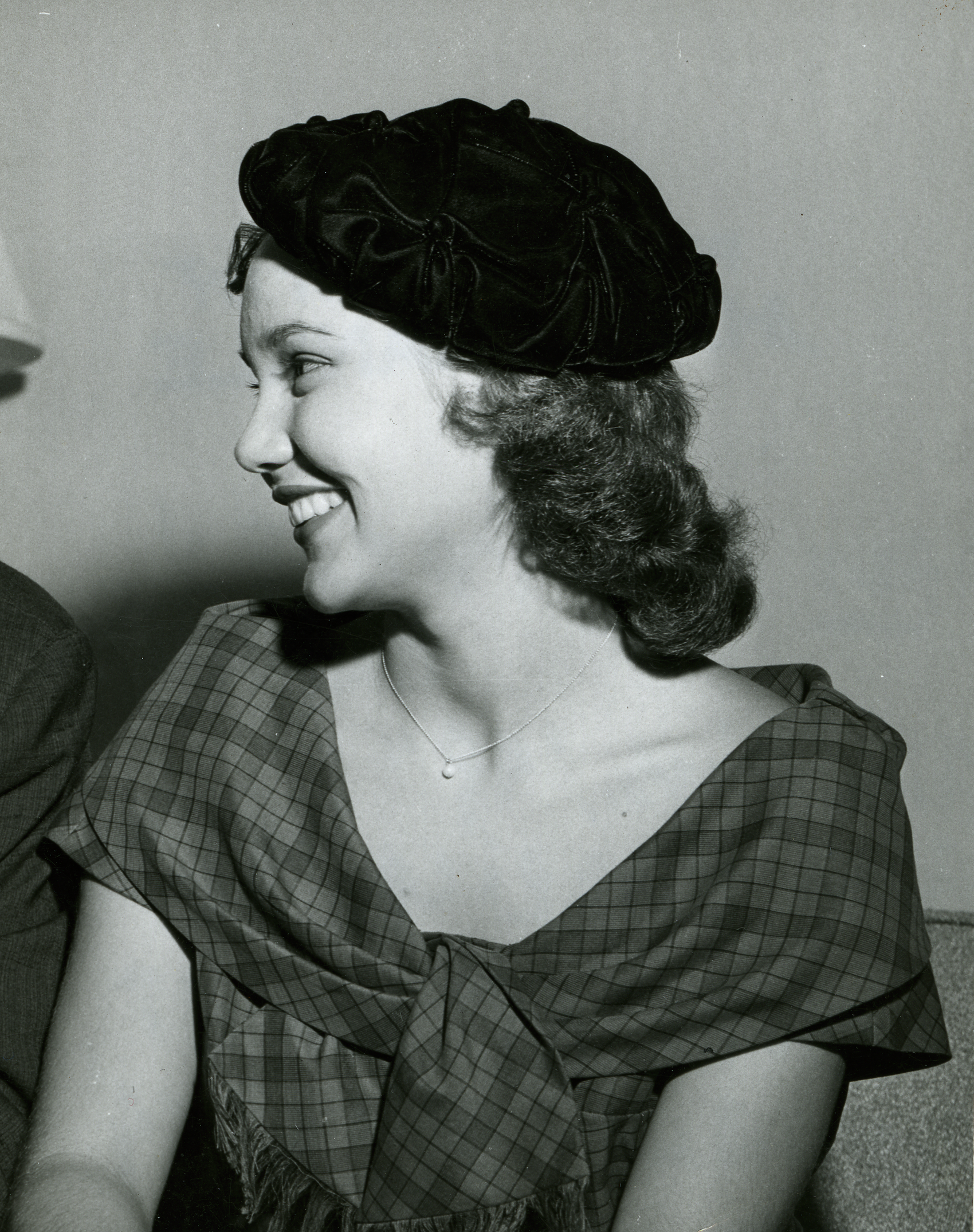
- Mobley in 1958
- Born: February 17, 1937; Biloxi, Mississippi, U.S.
- Died: December 9, 2014 (aged 77); Beverly Hills, California, U.S.
- Education: University of Mississippi
- Occupation: Actress
- Years active: 1960–2003
- Title: Miss Mississippi 1958; Miss America 1959
- Predecessor: Marilyn Van Derbur
- Successor: Lynda Lee Mead
- Spouse: Gary Collins (m. 1967; died 2012)
- Children: 1

Mary Ann Mobley (February 17, 1937 – December 9, 2014) was an American actress, television personality, and Miss America 1959.

== Early life and education ==
Mobley was born in 1937 in Biloxi, Mississippi. She grew up in Brandon, Mississippi, and graduated from Brandon High School. She attended the University of Mississippi (Ole Miss), where she was a member of Chi Omega sorority.

== Miss America ==
Mobley was crowned Miss America 1959, the first Mississippian to achieve this honor, winning the national talent award.

In September 1988, Mobley joined husband Gary Collins as co-host of the 1989 Miss America pageant, the 30th anniversary year of her own Miss America victory.

== Career ==
After her reign as Miss America 1959, Mobley embarked on a career in both film and television. She signed a five-year contract with MGM. She made her first television appearances on Be Our Guest in 1960, followed by five appearances on Burke's Law from 1963 to 1965. She made two films with Elvis Presley in 1965, Girl Happy and Harum Scarum.

She was given the Golden Globe Award for New Star of the Year – Actress in 1965. She was active in many charitable causes and was awarded the Outstanding Young Woman of the Year Award in 1966 by Lady Bird Johnson.

In 1966, Mobley was the female guest star on the first two-part episode of Mission: Impossible, in the episode “Old Man Out”. She went on to make multiple appearances on Perry Mason; Love, American Style; and Fantasy Island. She played a recurring role as Maggie McKinney Drummond on Diff'rent Strokes in the final season of the series, having taken over the role from Dixie Carter. She also played Arnold’s teacher on Diff'rent Strokes in season 2, episode 24. In Carter's later series, Designing Women, Mobley guest-starred as Karen Delaporte, the snide head of a historical society, who crosses swords with Carter's character, Julia Sugarbaker.

From 1973 to 1977, Mobley made occasional appearances on Match Game as one of the celebrity panelists. She and her husband Gary Collins played Dr. and Mrs. Diller on The Love Boat S2 E6 "Ship of Ghouls" (1978). From 1984 to 1988, Mobley joined Collins in co-hosting the Pillsbury Bake-Off on CBS.

She appeared in the documentary film Miss America, which PBS aired as the January 27, 2002, episode of American Experience.

Mobley is briefly depicted in the third season of the Amazon Prime series The Marvelous Mrs. Maisel, played by Amanda Dela Cruz.

== Public service/philanthropy ==
Mobley served on the National Council on Disability. She was also active with the March of Dimes, the Susan G. Komen Breast Cancer Foundation, and the Crohn's & Colitis Foundation.

== Personal life ==
In 1981, Mobley was inducted into the University of Mississippi Alumni Hall of Fame.

She married actor and television host Gary Collins in 1967 at Brandon United Methodist Church.

The couple separated in 2010 but reconciled and were living in Biloxi when Collins died on October 13, 2012. Collins and Mobley had one daughter together, Mary Clancy Collins. Mobley was also stepmother to Melissa Collins and Guy William Collins, children from his first marriage.

=== Health and death ===
Mobley had Crohn's disease and had at times been an activist for improvements in treatment.

She was treated in 2009 for Stage III breast cancer. Mobley died at her home in Beverly Hills, California, on December 9, 2014, at the age of 77, from breast cancer.

== Filmography ==
=== Film ===
- 1964: Get Yourself a College Girl - Teresa "Terry" Taylor
- 1965: Girl Happy - Deena
- 1965: Young Dillinger - Elaine
- 1965: Harum Scarum - Princess Shalimar
- 1966: Three on a Couch - Susan Manning
- 1967: The King's Pirate - Princess Patna
- 1968: For Singles Only - Anne Carr

=== Television ===
- 1959: Take a Good Look (ABC game show) - Herself
- 1960: Be Our Guest (CBS daytime TV show)
- 1963: General Hospital - Jonelle Andrews (1979)
- 1963-1965: Burke's Law - Teri / Cindy / Girl / Denise / Sugar
- 1964-1966: Perry Mason - Sharon Carmody / Dianne Adler
- 1965-1966: Run for Your Life - Laura Bronson / Clarice Newell
- 1966: The Man from U.N.C.L.E. - April Dancer
- 1966: Mission: Impossible - Crystal Walker
- 1967: The Virginian - Ellie Willard
- 1967: The Legend of Custer - Ann L'Andry
- 1968: Istanbul Express (TV Movie) - Peggy Coopersmith
- 1969: My Dog, the Thief, Part 1 (TV Movie) - Kim Lawrence
- 1969: My Dog, the Thief, Part 2 (TV Movie) - Kim Lawrence
- 1969–1973: Love, American Style - Linda / Joanne Fergusson / Carol / Pat
- 1969: Ironside - Marcy Atkins
- 1972: Search - Lilia Moen
- 1973: The Partridge Family - Audrey Parson
- 1973–1977: Match Game - Herself - Panelist
- 1974: The Girl on the Late, Late Show (TV Movie) - The Librarian
- 1974–1977: Tattletales - Herself
- 1977: The Fantastic Journey - Rhea
- 1978–1984: Fantasy Island - Bryana Spencer / Nancy Carsons / Florence Richmond / Linda Roth / Amanda DeHaven / Ellie Drake / Sheila Crane / Pamela Deering
- 1978–1985: The Love Boat (3 episodes) - Annette Epshaw / Marion Vail / Mrs. Diller
- 1979-1980 Whew! (TV Game Show) - Herself - Celebrity Contestant
- 1980–1986: Diff'rent Strokes - Maggie McKinney Drummond / Nancy Osborne
- 1980: Vega$ - Paula Conway
- 1984: Hotel - Catherine Stevens
- 1986: Super Password - Herself - Celebrity Contestant
- 1986: Rosie (as Sally Sugarbaker) Episode: "Peach's Sweet Treats"
- 1988: Falcon Crest (4 episodes) - Dr. Beth Everdene
- 1990: Designing Women - Karen Delaporte
- 1992: Hearts Afire - Mary Fran Smithers
- 1994: Bandit Bandit - Annie
- 1999: Sabrina, the Teenage Witch - Mary Ann Mobley
- 2003: Dead Like Me (TV Series) - Mary Ann Mobley (final appearance)

Awards and achievements
Preceded by Marilyn Van Derbur	Miss America; 1959	Succeeded by Lynda Lee Mead
Preceded by Mary Allen	Miss Mississippi; 1958	Succeeded by Margie Wilson

Media offices
Preceded by Gary Collins	Miss America host (with Gary Collins); 1989	Succeeded by Gary Collins & Phyllis George
