= Miss America 1956 =

29th Miss America pageant

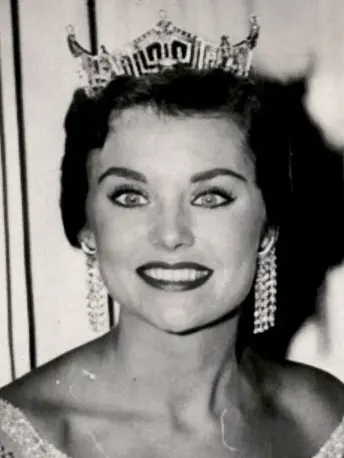
- Date: September 10, 1955
- Presenters: Bert Parks
- Venue: Boardwalk Hall, Atlantic City, New Jersey
- Broadcaster: ABC
- Entrants: 50
- Placements: 10
- Winner: Sharon Ritchie; Colorado

Miss America 1956, the 29th Miss America pageant, was held at the Boardwalk Hall in Atlantic City, New Jersey on September 10, 1955 and was broadcast of the competition on ABC.

Sharon Ritchie became the first Miss Colorado to be the winner. As she was crowned, master of ceremonies Bert Parks performed the song "There She Is..." for the first time.

== Results ==
=== Placements ===
Placements	Contestant
Miss America 1956	Colorado – Sharon Ritchie
1st Runner-Up	Oregon – Dorothy Johnson
2nd Runner-Up	Chicago – Florence Gallagher
3rd Runner-Up	North Carolina – Clara Faye Arnold
4th Runner-Up	Oklahoma – Ann Campbell
Top 10	Alabama – Patricia Huddleston; Arizona – Beth Andre; Florida – Sandra Wirth; Hawaii – Barbara Mamo Vieira; Massachusetts – Virginia E. Maffucci

=== Awards ===
==== Preliminary awards ====
Awards	Contestant
Lifestyle and Fitness	Hawaii - Barbara Mamo Vieira; North Carolina - Clara Faye Arnold; Oklahoma - Ann Campbell
Talent	Alabama - Patricia Huddleston; Florida - Sandra Wirth; Massachusetts - Virginia E. Maffucci

=== Other awards ===
Awards	Contestant
Miss Congeniality	Hawaii - Barbara Mamo Vieira
Non-finalist Talent	Missouri - Sharon Knickmeyer; Utah - Suzanne Storrs Poulton

== Contestants ==
State	Name	Hometown	Age	Talent	Placement	Awards	Notes
Alabama	Patricia Huddleston	Clanton	21	Classical Vocal, "Pace, Pace Mio Dio!" from La Forza del Destinó	Top 10	Preliminary Talent Award	
Arizona	Beth Andre	Phoenix		Comic Monologue, "What Do I Do Now, Mr. McLeod?"	Top 10		
Arkansas	Charlene Bowers	Helena		Vocal, "I Want to be Evil"			
California	Barbara Harris	Santa Cruz		Vocal, "Over the Rainbow"			
Canada	Dalyce Gail Smith	Whitehorse					
Chicago	Florence Gallagher	Chicago		Semi-classical Vocal, "Love is Where You Find it"	2nd runner-up		
Colorado	Sharon Ritchie	Denver	18	Recitation, "The Murder of Lidice" by Edna St. Vincent Millay	Winner		
Connecticut	Audrey Figlar	Hartford		Charleston Dance			
Delaware	Joanne Sakowski	Wilmington		Vocal			
(Washington, D.C.) District of Columbia	Judith Dunkle	Washington, D.C.	19	Vocal			
Florida	Sandra Wirth	Miami		Fire Baton, "Jazz Medley"	Top 10	Preliminary Talent Award	
(Georgia (U.S. state)) Georgia	Jeanine Parris	Atlanta	22	Dramatic Monologue			
Hawaii	Barbara Mamo Vieria	Honolulu		Vocal/Hula, "The Night is Young"	Top 10	Preliminary Lifestyle & Fitness Award Miss Congeniality	
Idaho	Judy Voiten	Boise	19	Vocal/Guitar, "Western Folk Song Medley"			
Illinois	Marian Elizabeth Cox	Oak Park		Vocal, "If I Loved You"			
Indiana	Carolyn Turner	Indianapolis		Chalk Talk & Poetry			
Iowa	Kay Taylor	Iowa City	20	Tap Dance, "French Maids Dreaming of Marriage"			
Kansas	Gail White	Arkansas City		Piano			
Kentucky	Ann Shirley Gillock	Carrollton		Organ			
Louisiana	Jan Aline Johnston	Ruston		Drama			
Maine	Janice Vaughn	Waterville		Dramatic Monologue			
Maryland	Carol Jeanette	Westminster		Fashion Display & Speech, "How to Pack a Suitcase"			
Massachusetts	Virginia Maffucci	Watertown		Dramatic Monologue, "Solitary Confinement"	Top 10	Preliminary Talent Award	
Michigan	Margaret Devereaux	Howell		Piano, "Flight of the Bumblebee"			
Minnesota	Marlyse Reed	Fairmont		Dramatic Monologue from L'Aiglon			
Mississippi	Carolyn Cochran	Lucedale		Dramatic Monologue			
Missouri	Sharon Knickmeyer	St. Louis		Synchronized Swimming		Non-finalist Talent Award	
Montana	Bertha Mae Huebl	Glendive		Vocal			
Nebraska	Sandra Spiecher	Omaha		Speech, "Teaching Handicapped Students"			
Nevada	Vivienne Potter	Reno		Dramatic Monologue, "An Address to the Jury"			
New Hampshire	Margaret Johnson	Dover		Dramatic Monologue			
New Jersey	Patricia Campbell	Camden		Dance			
New York City	Diana Deutsch	New York City		Art Sketching			
North Carolina	Clara Faye Arnold	Raleigh		Monologue, "Sabrina Fair"	3rd runner-up	Preliminary Lifestyle & Fitness Award	
North Dakota	MaryAnn Gibbs	Williston		Vocal			
Ohio	Marguerite Garr	Cincinnati		Vocal & Zither, "Old Black Joe"			
Oklahoma	Ann Campbell	Oklahoma City		Speech & Furniture Design Display	4th runner-up	Preliminary Lifestyle & Fitness Award	
Oregon	Dorothy Johnson	Portland		Dramatic Monologue from Macbeth	1st runner-up		
Pennsylvania	Pam Ulrich	Sinking Spring		Drama, "Proper Recitation"			
Puerto Rico	Gladys Rodríguez						
Rhode Island	Claire Mae Emerson	Pawtucket		Dramatic Monologue			
South Carolina	Martha Chestnut	Conway		Piano			
South Dakota	Connie White	Canistota		Piano			
Tennessee	Patty Williams	Jackson		Vocal, "The Student Prince"			
Texas	June Prichard	Seymour		Horseback Riding			1st runner-up at Miss Dixie 1957
Utah	Suzanne Storrs Poulton	Salt Lake City				Non-finalist Talent Award	
Vermont	Phyllis Reich	Bennington		Vocal & Dance			
Virginia	Betty Sue Matthews	Norfolk		Vocal, "There's No Business Like Show Business"			
West Virginia	Mary Fryman	Madison		Vocal			
Wisconsin	Margaret Walls	Milwaukee	18	Ballet, "Dying Swan"			
