= Sharon Ritchie =

Miss America 1956 (born 1937)

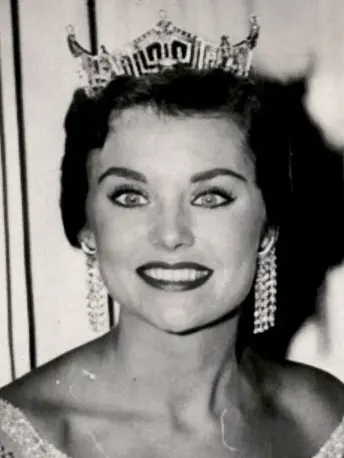
- Ritchie in 1957
- Born: Sharon Kay Ritchie; January 12, 1937 (age 89); Grand Island, Nebraska
- Title: Miss Colorado 1955; Miss America 1956
- Predecessor: Lee Meriwether
- Successor: Marian McKnight
- Spouses: Don Cherry (m. 1956; div. 1961) Kyle Rote (m. 1965; div. 1972) Robert M. Fomon (m. 1975; div. 1984) Terry Mullin (m. 1992)
- Children: 2

Sharon Kay Ritchie (born January 12, 1937) was Miss America in 1956.

== Early life ==
Ritchie spent her childhood in Grand Island, Nebraska, but hailed from Denver and was later crowned Miss Colorado 1955.

== Personal life ==
Ritchie was previously married to singer/golfer Don Cherry; former football player and sportscaster Kyle Rote; and E. F. Hutton & Co. chairman Robert M. Fomon. She has two children from her marriage to Cherry.

She has been married to Terry Mullin since 1992.

Awards and achievements
Preceded by Lee Meriwether	Miss America; 1956	Succeeded by Marian McKnight
Preceded by Barbara Busey	Miss Colorado; 1955	Succeeded by Polly Childs
