= Miss America 1982 =

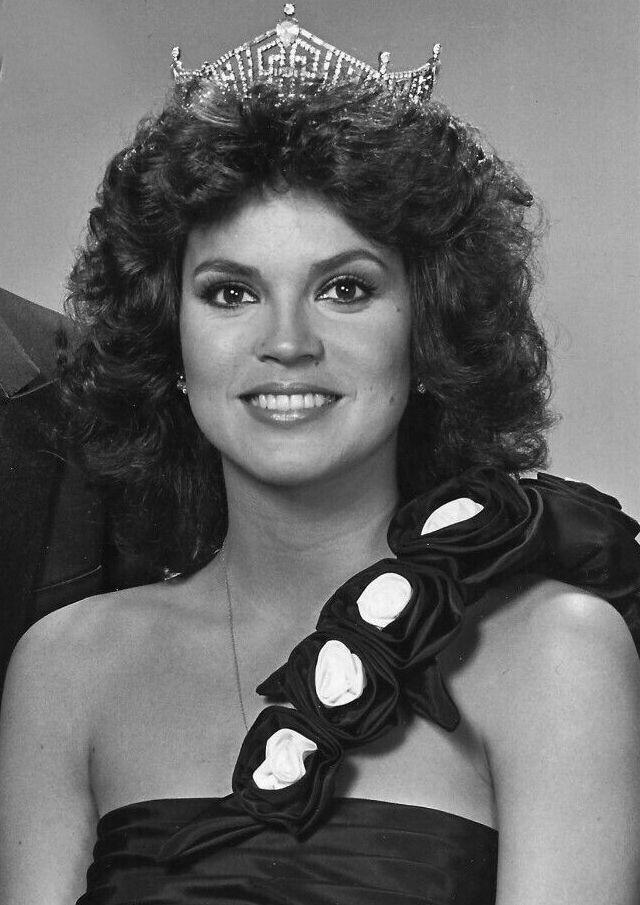
- Elizabeth Ward as Miss America 1982
- Date: September 12, 1981
- Presenters: Ron Ely
- Venue: Boardwalk Hall, Atlantic City, New Jersey
- Broadcaster: NBC
- Entrants: 50
- Placements: 10
- Winner: Elizabeth Ward; Arkansas

Miss America 1982, the 55th Miss America pageant, was held at the Boardwalk Hall in Atlantic City, New Jersey on September 12, 1981, on NBC Network. Elizabeth Ward of Arkansas was crowned by Miss America 1981 Susan Powell. She was the second Miss Arkansas to win the title after Donna Axum in 1964.

== Results ==
=== Placements ===
Placement	Contestant
Miss America 1982	Arkansas – Elizabeth Ward
1st Runner-Up	Illinois – Sandra Truitt †
2nd Runner-Up	Georgia – Kristl Evans
3rd Runner-Up	Indiana – Pamela Carlberg
4th Runner-Up	Texas – Sheri Ryman
Top 10	Mississippi – Karen Hopson; New York – Suzanne Alexander; Oregon – Julie Ross; Utah – Jonelle Smith; Wisconsin – Keungsuk Kim

=== Preliminary awards ===
Awards	Contestant
Lifestyle and Fitness	Arkansas - Elizabeth Ward; Mississippi - Karen Hopson; (Washington (state)) Washington - Kristine Elizabeth Weitz
Talent	Illinois - Sandra Truitt; (New York (state)) New York - Suzanne Alexander; Texas - Sheri Ryman

==== Non-finalist awards ====
Awards	Contestant
Talent	Arizona - Sarah Tattersall; Idaho - Stephanie Kambitsch; Iowa - Darla Vesta Blocker; New Hampshire - Natalie Oliver; New Jersey - Debra Naley; North Carolina - Lynn Williford; Ohio - Juliana Zilba; (Washington (state)) Washington - Kristine Elizabeth Weitz

== Contestants ==
State	Name	Hometown	Age	Talent	Placement	Special Awards	Notes
Alabama	Phoebe Stone	Huntsville	22	Ballet, "Mame"			
Alaska	Laura Trollan	Juneau	19	Ballet/Jazz Dance, "Most Wanted"			
Arizona	Sarah Tattersall	Scottsdale	20	Vocal, "Maybe This Time" & "The Man That Got Away" from Cabaret		Non-finalist Talent Award	
Arkansas	Grace Elizabeth Ward	Russellville	20	Vocal, "After You've Gone"	Winner	Preliminary Lifestyle & Fitness Award	Previously National Sweetheart 1980
California	Cheryl Vancleave	Riverside	20	Country Vocal Medley, "I Was Country When Country Wasn't Cool" & "You're Lookin' at Country"			Later married Frank Kalil Mother to Ryan Kalil and Matt Kalil
Colorado	Lynnette Jessen	Denver	20	Acrobatic Dance, Theme from Exodus			Later Miss Colorado USA 1985
Connecticut	Virginia Reichardt	Danbury	21	Country Western Vocal, "Love is a Rose" & "Queen of Hearts"			
Delaware	Jodi Meade Graham	Wilmington	19	Vocal, "Can You Read My Mind"			Daughter of Miss Pennsylvania 1956, Lorna Ringler Graham Grand-niece of Miss America 1924, Ruth Malcomson
Florida	Dean Herman	Jacksonville	23	Gymnastics Dance, "They're Playing Our Song"			
(Georgia (U.S. state)) Georgia	Kristl Evans	Atlanta	21	Vocal, "Ring Them Bells"	2nd runner-up		
Hawaii	Pamela Iwalani Offer	Honolulu	23	Vocal, "Don't Cry for Me Argentina"			Mother of Miss Arizona 2010, Kathryn Bulkley
Idaho	Stephanie Kambitsch	Genesee	22	Piano, "Hungarian Rhapsody No. 11"		Non-finalist Talent Award	
Illinois	Sandra Truitt	Evanston	25	Classical Vocal, "Près des remparts de Séville" from Carmen	1st runner-up	Preliminary Talent Award	
Indiana	Pam Carlberg	Bourbon	21	Accordion Medley, "Sabre Dance" & "Ritual Fire Dance"	3rd runner-up		
Iowa	Darla Blocker	Davenport	19	Vocal, "But the World Goes Round"		Non-finalist Talent Award	
Kansas	Dawn Holmstrom	Wichita	20	Vocal Medley, "My Man" & "Happy Days are Here Again"			
Kentucky	Sheri Copeland	Benton	20	Popular Vocal, "Out Here on My Own" from Fame			
Louisiana	Donese Worden	Monroe	22	Violin, "Millionaire's Hoe-Down"			
Maine	Kathleen Jarrell	Orr's Island	19	Vocal Medley, "Swanee", "My Mammy", & "I'm Happy"			
Maryland	Robin Harmon	Hagerstown	24	Greek Dramatic Monologue from Antigone			
Massachusetts	Deborah Salois	North Andover	19	Vocal, "Keepin' Out of Mischief Now" from Ain't Misbehavin'			
Michigan	Gwen Roberta Brown	Ishpeming	22	Dramatic Presentation of Original Writing, "Memory of Grandmother"			
Minnesota	Elizabeth Ruyak	Mankato	20	Piano, Fantaisie-Impromptu by Frédéric Chopin			Became television host/reporter with CBS/NBC -- part of five Summer/Winter Olympics broadcast teams from 1992-2002
Mississippi	Karen Hopson	Vicksburg	21	Character Ballet en Pointe, "Overture" from Annie	Top 10	Preliminary Lifestyle & Fitness Award	
Missouri	Theresa McDonnell	Florissant	22	Vocal, "Let's Hear it for Me" from Funny Lady			
Montana	Sue Harris	Helena	19	Gymnastics Dance, Theme from Hawaii Five-O			
Nebraska	Jill Pershing	Lincoln	21	Ballet en Pointe, Rhapsody in Blue			
Nevada	Suzanne Bowman	Reno	20	Modern Rhythmic Gymnastics, "Zero to Sixty in Five"			
New Hampshire	Natalie Oliver	Manchester	21	Vocal, "Home" from The Wiz		Non-finalist Talent Award	
New Jersey	Debra Naley	Rockaway	26	Violin Medley, "Csárdás" & "Orange Blossom Special"		Non-finalist Talent Award	
New Mexico	Lynn Lawson	Portales	21	Classical Piano, "Piano Concerto No. 2, Third Movement" by Rachmaninoff			
(New York (state)) New York	Suzanne Alexander	Lyons Falls	20	Classical Vocal, "Vissi d'arte" from Tosca	Top 10	Preliminary Talent Award	
North Carolina	Lynn Williford	Wilmington	24	Russian Character Dance, "Czardas"		Non-finalist Talent Award	
North Dakota	Stacie Anfinson	Hettinger	21	Vocal, "I Only Want to Say"			
Ohio	Juliana Zilba	Mansfield	21	Vocal Medley, "Up the Ladder to the Roof" & "With One More Look at You" from A Star is Born		Dr. David B. Allman Medical Scholarship Non-finalist Talent Award	Sister of Miss Ohio 1986, Mary Zilba
Oklahoma	April Clayton	Cameron	22	Ballet en Pointe, "The Blue Danube"			
Oregon	Julie Ross	Portland	20	Classical Piano, "Toccata" by Prokofiev	Top 10		
Pennsylvania	Jill Shaffer	Dover	22	Piano, "Piano Concerto in A Minor" by Grieg			
Rhode Island	Kathleen Cryan	Providence	23	Jazz Dance, "Electro-Phantasma"			
South Carolina	Jill Rankin	Columbia	21	Figure Skating, "Mozart's Piano Concerto No. 21 in C Major"			
South Dakota	Pennisue Largent	Hot Springs	22	Vocal & Jazz Dance, "Misty"			
Tennessee	Angelina Johnson	Jackson	20	Ventriloquism, "Laverne & Shirley"			
Texas	Sheri Ryman	Texas City	20	Gymnastics, Theme from Close Encounters of the Third Kind	4th runner-up	Preliminary Talent Award	
Utah	Jonelle Smith	Provo	23	Classical Vocal, "Sempre Libera" from La traviata	Top 10		
Vermont	Kimberly Nestle	Shelburne	19	Acrobatic Jazz Dance, "I Hope I Get It" from A Chorus Line			
Virginia	Vicky Pulliam	Martinsville	21	Semi-classical Vocal, "Art is Calling for Me" from The Enchantress by Victor Herbert			
(Washington (state)) Washington	Kristine Weitz	Moses Lake	19	Jazz Vocal, "Summertime"		Preliminary Lifestyle & Fitness Award Non-finalist Talent Award	
West Virginia	Candy Cohen	Huntington	24	Tap Dance, "How High the Moon"			
Wisconsin	Keungsuk Kim	Shorewood	19	Classical Piano, "Kabalevsky's Prelude"	Top 10		
Wyoming	Keri Borgaard	Cheyenne	23	Vocal Medley, "At the Crossroads" & "Hey, Look Me Over"			
