= Sally Miller (disambiguation) =

Sally Miller was an American slave.

Sally Miller may also refer to:

- Sally Perdue, aka Sally Miller, American beauty queen and radio talk show host
- Sally Miller, a character from The Charmings American sitcom

== See also ==
- Sally Miller Gearhart, lesbian American feminist
