= Bill Clinton sexual assault and misconduct allegations =

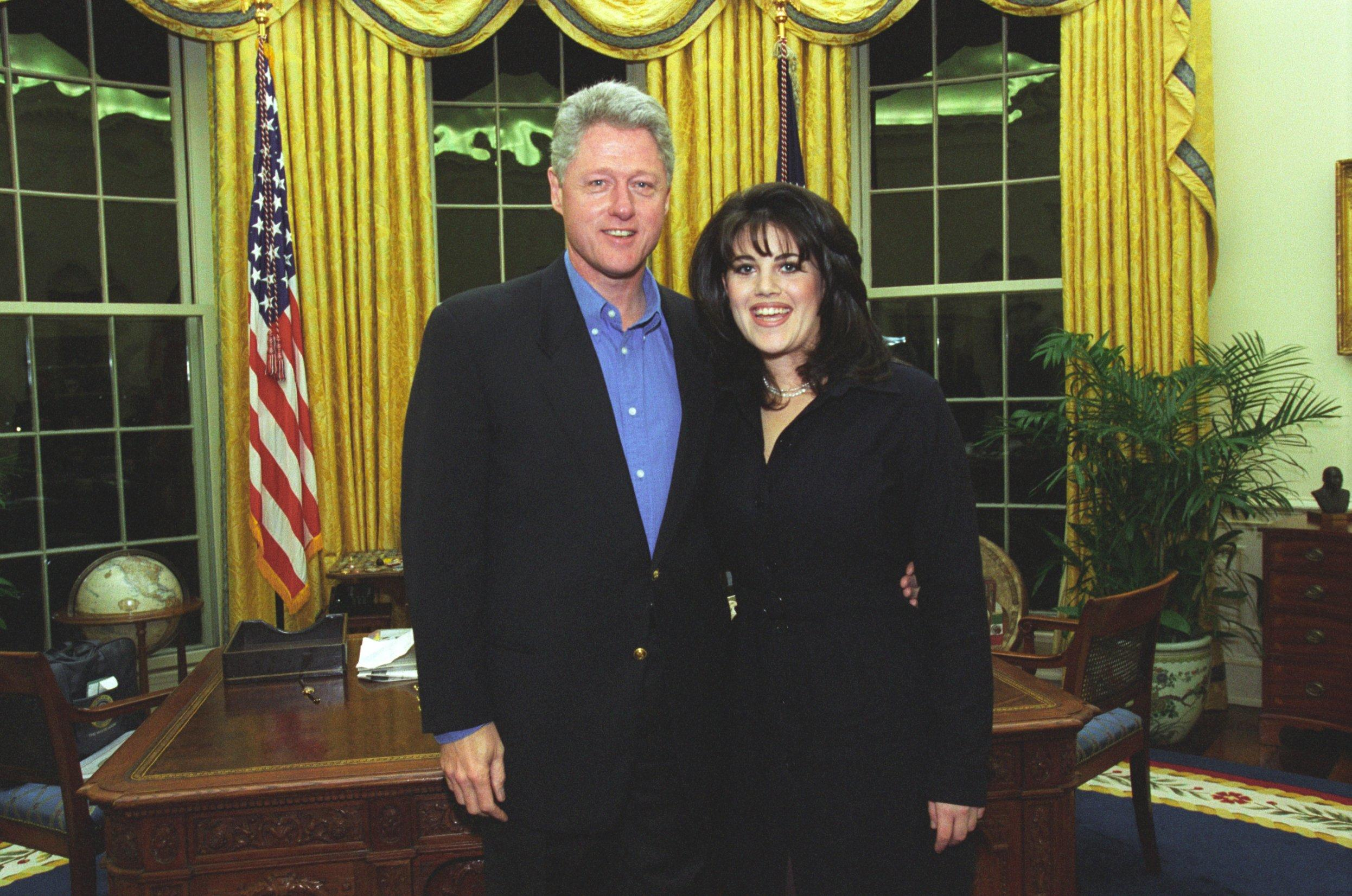
Bill Clinton and Monica Lewinsky on February 28, 1997

Bill Clinton, the 42nd president of the United States (1993–2001), has been publicly accused of sexual misconduct, including rape, harassment, and sexual assault. Additionally, some commentators have characterized Clinton's sexual relationship with former White House intern Monica Lewinsky as predatory or non-consensual, while Lewinsky called the relationship consensual at the time before saying it was an abuse of power. These allegations have been revisited and lent more credence in 2018, in light of the #MeToo movement, with many commentators and Democratic leaders now saying Clinton should have been compelled to resign after the Lewinsky scandal.

== Overview ==
In 1994, Paula Jones initiated a sexual harassment lawsuit against Bill Clinton, claiming he had made unwanted advances towards her in 1991; Clinton denied the allegations. In April 1998, the case was initially dismissed by Judge Susan Webber Wright on the grounds that it lacked legal merit. Jones appealed Webber Wright's ruling, and her suit gained traction following Clinton's admission to having an affair with Monica Lewinsky in August 1998. In 1998, lawyers for Paula Jones released court documents that alleged a pattern of sexual harassment by Clinton when he was Governor of Arkansas. Robert S. Bennett, Clinton's main lawyer for the case, called the filing "a pack of lies" and "an organized campaign to smear the President of the United States" funded by Clinton's political enemies. In October 1998, Clinton's attorneys tentatively offered $700,000 to settle the case, which was less than the $800,000 which Jones' lawyers sought. Clinton later agreed to an out-of-court settlement and paid Jones $850,000. Bennett said the president made the settlement only so he could end the lawsuit for good and move on with his life. During the deposition for the Jones lawsuit, which was held at the White House, Clinton denied having sexual relations with Monica Lewinsky—a denial that became the basis for an impeachment charge of perjury.

In 1998, Kathleen Willey alleged that Clinton had groped her in the Oval Office on November 29, 1993. The U.S. Office of the Independent Counsel’s final report determined Willey gave "false information" to the FBI after being granted immunity, inconsistent with sworn testimony related to the Jones allegation. On March 19, 1998, Julie Hiatt Steele, a friend of Willey, released an affidavit, accusing the former White House aide of asking her to lie to corroborate Ms. Willey's account of being sexually groped by Clinton in the Oval Office. An attempt by Kenneth Starr to prosecute Steele for making false statements and obstructing justice ended in a mistrial and Starr declined to seek a retrial after Steele sought an investigation against the former independent counsel for prosecutorial misconduct.

Also in 1998, Juanita Broaddrick alleged that Clinton had raped her in the spring of 1978, although she said she did not remember the exact date. To support her charge, Broaddrick notes that she told multiple witnesses in 1978 she had been raped by Clinton, something these witnesses also state in interviews to the press. Broaddrick had earlier filed an affidavit denying any "unwelcome sexual advances" and later repeated the denial in a sworn deposition. In an interview with NBC Dateline in February 1999 wherein she detailed the alleged rape, Broaddrick conceded that she had denied under oath being raped, but claimed it was only to avoid testifying about the ordeal publicly.

The Lewinsky scandal has had an enduring impact on Clinton's legacy, beyond his impeachment in 1998. In the wake of the #MeToo movement (which shed light on the widespread prevalence of sexual assault and harassment, especially in the workplace), various commentators and Democratic political leaders, as well as Lewinsky herself, have revisited their view that the Lewinsky affair was consensual, and instead characterized it as an abuse of power or harassment, in light of the power differential between a president and a 22-year old intern. In 2018, Clinton was asked in several interviews about whether he should have resigned, and he said he had made the right decision in not resigning. During the 2018 Congressional elections, The New York Times alleged that having no Democratic candidate for office asking Clinton to campaign with them was a change that attributed to the revised understanding of the Lewinsky scandal. However, former DNC interim chair Donna Brazile previously urged Clinton in November 2017 to campaign during the 2018 midterm elections, in spite of New York U.S. senator Kirsten Gillibrand's recent criticism of the Lewinsky scandal.

== Accusations ==
=== Juanita Broaddrick ===
In a 1999 episode of Dateline NBC, former Bill Clinton campaign volunteer Juanita Broaddrick alleged that, in the late 1970s, Clinton raped her in her hotel room. According to Broaddrick, she agreed to meet with Clinton for coffee in the lobby of her hotel, but Clinton asked if they could go to her room to avoid a crowd of reporters; she agreed. Broaddrick stated that once Clinton had isolated her in her hotel room, he raped her. Broaddrick stated Clinton injured her lip by biting it during the assault. In 1999, Clinton denied Broaddrick's allegations through his lawyer.

Supporters of Clinton have questioned her account by noting that, when Broaddrick testified about her alleged encounter with Clinton under oath, she denied having been raped by him. In her NBC interview alleging rape, Broaddrick said that she had only denied being raped under oath to protect her privacy. Supporters of Clinton have also noted that she continued to support him, and appear at public events on his behalf, weeks after the alleged rape, and that Broaddrick said that she could not remember the day or month the alleged incident occurred. Broaddrick has alleged that in 1978 she revealed the alleged assault to five intimates, and that they advised her not to cause trouble for herself by going public.

=== Leslie Millwee ===
In October 2016, Leslie Millwee accused Bill Clinton of sexually assaulting her three times in 1980. Millwee was then an employee at a now-defunct Arkansas-based television station, and Clinton was then governor of Arkansas. Millwee told Breitbart News that on each of the three occasions, Clinton came up behind her and fondled her breasts, and on the second occasion, he rubbed his crotch against her and came to orgasm.

=== Paula Jones ===
According to Paula Jones' account, on May 8, 1991, she was escorted to Clinton's hotel room in Little Rock, Arkansas, where he propositioned and exposed himself to her. She claimed she kept quiet about the incident until 1994, when a David Brock story in the American Spectator magazine printed an account. In 1994, Jones and her attorneys, Joseph Cammarata and Gilbert Davis, filed a federal lawsuit against Clinton alleging sexual harassment. In the discovery stage of the suit, Jones' lawyers had the opportunity to question Clinton under oath about his sexual history; in the course of this testimony, Clinton denied having had a sexual affair with Monica Lewinsky, a denial that, after his affair with Lewinsky was subsequently exposed, eventually led to his impeachment for perjury and obstruction of justice.

Several witnesses disputed Jones' account, including her sister and brother-in-law. These witnesses contended that she had described her encounter with Clinton as "happy" and "gentle". In addition, Jones had claimed to friends that Clinton had a particular deformity on his penis, a claim that was revealed to be false by investigators.

However, legal analyst Stuart Taylor Jr. wrote a 15,000 word piece in the November 1996 issue of The American Lawyer defending the merits of the case, which included a large number of contemporaneous witnesses to whom Jones had confided at that time, and asking why the national media had not treated her accusations more seriously. Taylor's article led to numerous media organizations revisiting the case, and indicating that it indeed had merit.

In April 1998, the case was dismissed by judge Susan Webber Wright as lacking legal merit. However, Jones appealed Webber Wright's ruling, and her suit gained traction following Clinton's admission to having an affair with Monica Lewinsky in August 1998. This admission indicated that Clinton may have lied under oath when he testified in the Jones case that he had never had a sexual relationship with Lewinsky.

In October 1998, Clinton's attorneys tentatively offered $700,000 to settle the case, which was then the $800,000 which Jones' lawyers sought. In November 1998, Clinton agreed to an out-of-court settlement, paying Jones and her lawyers $850,000 to drop the suit, but acknowledged no wrongdoing and offered no apology; the vast majority of this money was also used to pay Jones' legal fees. Clinton's lawyer said that the president made the settlement only so he could end the lawsuit for good and move on with his life.

=== Kathleen Willey ===
In 1998, Kathleen Willey alleged Clinton groped her without consent in the White House Oval Office in 1993. Kenneth Starr granted her immunity for her testimony in his separate inquiry.

Linda Tripp, the Clinton Administration staffer who secretly taped her phone conversations with Monica Lewinsky in order to expose the latter's affair with the president, testified under oath that Willey's sexual contact with President Clinton in 1993 was consensual, that Willey had been flirting with the president, and that Willey was happy and excited following her 1993 encounter with Clinton. Six other friends of Willey confirmed Tripp's account in sworn testimony, stating that Willey had sought a sexual relationship with the president. Ken Starr, who had deposed Willey in the course of investigating Clinton's sexual history, determined that she had lied under oath repeatedly to his investigators. Starr and his team therefore concluded that there was insufficient evidence to pursue her allegations further. In 2007, Willey published a book about her experiences with the Clintons.

=== Other accusations ===
In April 1998, Inside Edition reported that Cristy Zercher, a former flight attendant, had accused Clinton of groping and fondling her on a 1992 campaign flight while his wife Hillary was sleeping nearby.

In 1999, Eileen Wellstone reiterated to reporters that she had accused Clinton of sexually assaulting her in 1969, when they were students at Oxford. Wellstone filed a complaint with the university, but no charges were brought against Clinton.

A campaign staffer, Sandra Allen James, accused Clinton of sexually assaulting her in his hotel room in 1991. She claimed that he exposed himself to her and forced her to conduct oral sex on him while they were sitting on the couch.

A former professor from the University of Arkansas claimed Clinton had groped a female student and tried to trap her in his office when he was a professor. This would later be backed up by a piece written by Daniel Harris and Teresa Hampton, which alleged that students at the university confirmed that Clinton had tried to force himself on them when he was a professor.

Karen Hinton, who served in the Clinton administration under the HUD Secretary Andrew Cuomo, told journalist Michael Isikoff that Clinton had harassed her at a fundraiser in 1984. Hinton claimed that Clinton had been staring at her and that he wrote down his hotel room number and a question mark on a napkin and gave it to her, which she said made her feel humiliated. Her allegations were published in Isikoff's book Uncovering Clinton.

Bill Clinton developed a relationship with financier and sex offender Jeffrey Epstein that began in the early 1990s and continued into the early 2000s. During Clinton’s presidency, Epstein made multiple visits to the White House and maintained ties with Clinton’s associates; after Clinton left office, he traveled on Epstein’s private jet on several occasions for charitable trips. After Epstein’s later exposure as a sex offender, Clinton has denied any knowledge of Epstein’s criminal activities and distanced himself from the disgraced financier. Epstein’s former employee Johanna Sjoberg testified in 2016 that Epstein had once quipped “Clinton likes them young” in reference to girls. Another allegation surfaced in a 2011 email from Virginia Giuffre (made public years later), in which Giuffre told a journalist that “B. Clinton” had personally intervened to pressure Vanity Fair magazine not to publish an exposé about Epstein’s sex trafficking, calling Epstein “his good friend". However, in August 2025, Ghislaine Maxwell testified that she in fact facilitated much of their relationship, with the two not having a personal friendship. It has also been acknowledged that Clinton and Epstein's relationship became strained by 2003, with the claim that Clinton visited Epstein's private island in the U.S. Virgin Islands also being discredited by Secret Service records. In her posthumous memoir Nobody's Girl renowned Epstein accuser Virginia Giuffre would also concede how Maxwell bragged about how "she loved to talk about how easily she could get former President Bill Clinton on the phone" to arrange visits between him and Epstein, with Maxwell also accompanying Epstein to the White House during the visits he made when Clinton was U.S. President. On November 12, 2025, a list of names documented in Epstein's flight logs and personal contact book records was published by The Independent which showed Clinton was listed in Epstein's flight logs. However, Clinton was not mentioned as being among those who were listed in Epstein's personal contact book.

In November 2017, sources within the Democratic Party told author and former foreign editor of Newsweek Edward Klein that Clinton was being accused of sexual assault by four women. The plaintiffs alleged that the assaults took place shortly after the end of his presidency in the early 2000s, while they were in their late teens. A member of Clinton's legal team confirmed the existence of new allegations against Clinton.

== 2016 United States presidential election ==
Charges of sexual misconduct on Bill Clinton's part resurfaced during the 2016 presidential campaign of Hillary Clinton. When a lewd recording of Hillary's opponent Donald Trump discussing the ability to grope women when in power was released during the campaign, Broaddrick, Willey, and Jones reemerged as critics of Hillary Clinton, accusing her of enabling her husband's alleged sexual assaults on them. Two days after the release of the recording, they appeared as guests at the second 2016 presidential debate and referenced Bill Clinton in pre-debate statements.

Broaddrick's allegations resurfaced early in the campaign. In various media interviews, Broaddrick stated that Bill Clinton raped her and that Hillary Clinton knew about it and tried to threaten Broaddrick into remaining silent. She said that she started giving some interviews in 2015 because she was angered by the hypocrisy of Hillary Clinton's statement that victims of sexual assault should be believed.

== Reactions ==
=== Bill Clinton ===
Bill Clinton has adamantly denied all four accusations. Through his representatives, Clinton has responded to the allegations by casting doubt on the credibility of the accusers, saying that (in the case of Broaddrick and Willey) they previously testified under oath that Clinton never made unwanted advances. Several witnesses close to Willey and Jones have stated that the two women described their encounter with Clinton as consensual. Clinton has admitted extramarital relationships with Monica Lewinsky and Gennifer Flowers, both of which have generally been accepted as consensual.

When asked in 2018 whether he would have approached the sexual misconduct allegations differently in the wake of the MeToo movement, Clinton said that he would not. When he was asked if he owed Lewinsky a personal apology, Clinton said that he did not.

=== Hillary Clinton ===
Hillary Clinton has largely remained silent on the topic of the allegations against Bill. In her 2017 memoir What Happened, Clinton noted that Donald Trump "brought to our second debate three women who had accused my husband of bad acts decades ago."

=== Other reactions ===
In a 1998 op-ed for The New York Times titled "Feminists and the Clinton Question", prominent feminist Gloria Steinem was critical of the response to the allegations against Clinton, writing:

If all the sexual allegations now swirling around the White House turn out to be true, President Clinton may be a candidate for sex addiction therapy. But feminists will still have been right to resist pressure by the right wing and the media to call for his resignation or impeachment. The pressure came from another case of the double standard. For one thing, if the President had behaved with comparable insensitivity toward environmentalists, and at the same time remained their most crucial champion and bulwark against an anti-environmental Congress, would they be expected to desert him? I don't think so.

On the topic of the accusation by Willey against Clinton, Steinem wrote: "He is accused of having made a gross, dumb and reckless pass at a supporter during a low point in her life. She pushed him away, she said, and it never happened again. In other words, President Clinton took ''no'' for an answer", and wrote on the accusation by Jones: "As with the allegations in Ms. Willey's case, Mr. Clinton seems to have made a clumsy sexual pass, then accepted rejection."

Steinem's article received some criticism from the media when it was published, including from the New York Times itself. Conservative commentator Ann Coulter derided Steinem's understanding of sexual assault as "the boss gets one free grope." Caitlin Flanagan, writing for The Atlantic in 2017, described the article as "notorious" and that it "must surely stand as one of the most regretted public actions of [Steinem's] life", saying that the article "slut-shamed, victim-blamed, and age-shamed; it urged compassion for and gratitude to the man the women accused". Flanagan added: "Moreover … it characterized contemporary feminism as a weaponized auxiliary of the Democratic Party."

In 2016, on the U.S. television program The View, co-host Joy Behar referred to Bill Clinton's accusers as "tramps". Behar apologized for the sexual slur shortly afterwards.

=== #MeToo retrospectives ===
By late 2017, the allegations against Clinton and his standing within the Democratic Party were being reconsidered. This was prompted as a result of the Harvey Weinstein sexual abuse allegations, which quickly triggered the Weinstein effect and the Me Too movement, with liberals and feminists reconsidering their lack of support for the alleging women at the time. Michelle Goldberg wrote that Broaddrick's allegations meant that "Bill Clinton no longer has a place in decent society."

Sitting U.S. Senator Kirsten Gillibrand, who had succeeded Hillary Clinton in the Senate, went so far as to say Clinton should have resigned the presidency over his misconduct. A HuffPost/YouGov survey found that 53 percent of people who voted for Hillary Clinton in the 2016 election believed that the accusations against Bill Clinton were credible, while 83 percent of Trump voters found the accusations credible.

Some commentators have characterized Clinton's affair with Lewinsky, who was at the time a White House intern, as sexual misconduct because of the vast power imbalance between a president and an intern; Lewinsky was 22 at the time and described the relationship as completely consensual. In 2018, Lewinsky herself began to question her long-standing view that her relationship with Clinton had been consensual, characterizing the relationship as a "gross abuse of power" wherein the power differential between the two was so great that "consent might well be rendered moot." In October 2018, Hillary Clinton stated in an interview on CBS News Sunday Morning that Bill's affair with Lewinsky did not constitute an abuse of power because Lewinsky "was an adult".

During the 2018 Congressional elections, The New York Times alleged that having no Democratic candidate for office asking Clinton to campaign with them was a change that attributed to the revised understanding of the Lewinsky scandal. However, former DNC interim chair Donna Brazile previously urged Clinton in November 2017 to campaign during the 2018 midterm elections, in spite of Kirsten Gillibrand's recent criticism of the Lewinsky scandal.

== Related books ==
Several books have been published related to these incidents. These include:

- High Crimes and Misdemeanors: The Case Against Bill Clinton (1998) by Ann Coulter
- No One Left to Lie To: The Triangulations of William Jefferson Clinton (1999) by Christopher Hitchens
- Their Lives: The Women Targeted by the Clinton Machine (2005) by Candice E. Jackson

A book and the subsequent documentary also on the topic is:

- The Hunting of the President (2000) by Joe Conason and Gene Lyons
