= Miss Arkansas =

Beauty pageant competition

- Formation: 1932
- Headquarters: Little Rock
- Location: Arkansas
- Members: Miss America
- Official language: English
- Key people: Lacy Glover (executive director)
- Website: missarkansas.org

The Miss Arkansas competition is the pageant that selects the representative for the state of Arkansas in the Miss America pageant. Arkansas has won the Miss America title three times (1964, 1982, 2017).

Ava Weeks of Conway was crowned Miss Arkansas on June 13, 2026, at Robinson Center Auditorium in Little Rock. She competed for the title of Miss America 2027 on September 6, 2026, at the Kravis Center for the Performing Arts in West Palm Beach, Florida.

== Gallery of past titleholders ==
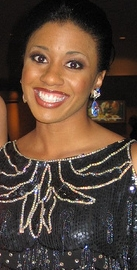
Eudora Mosby,
Miss Arkansas 2005

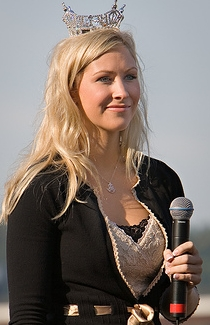
Amber Bennett,
Miss Arkansas 2006

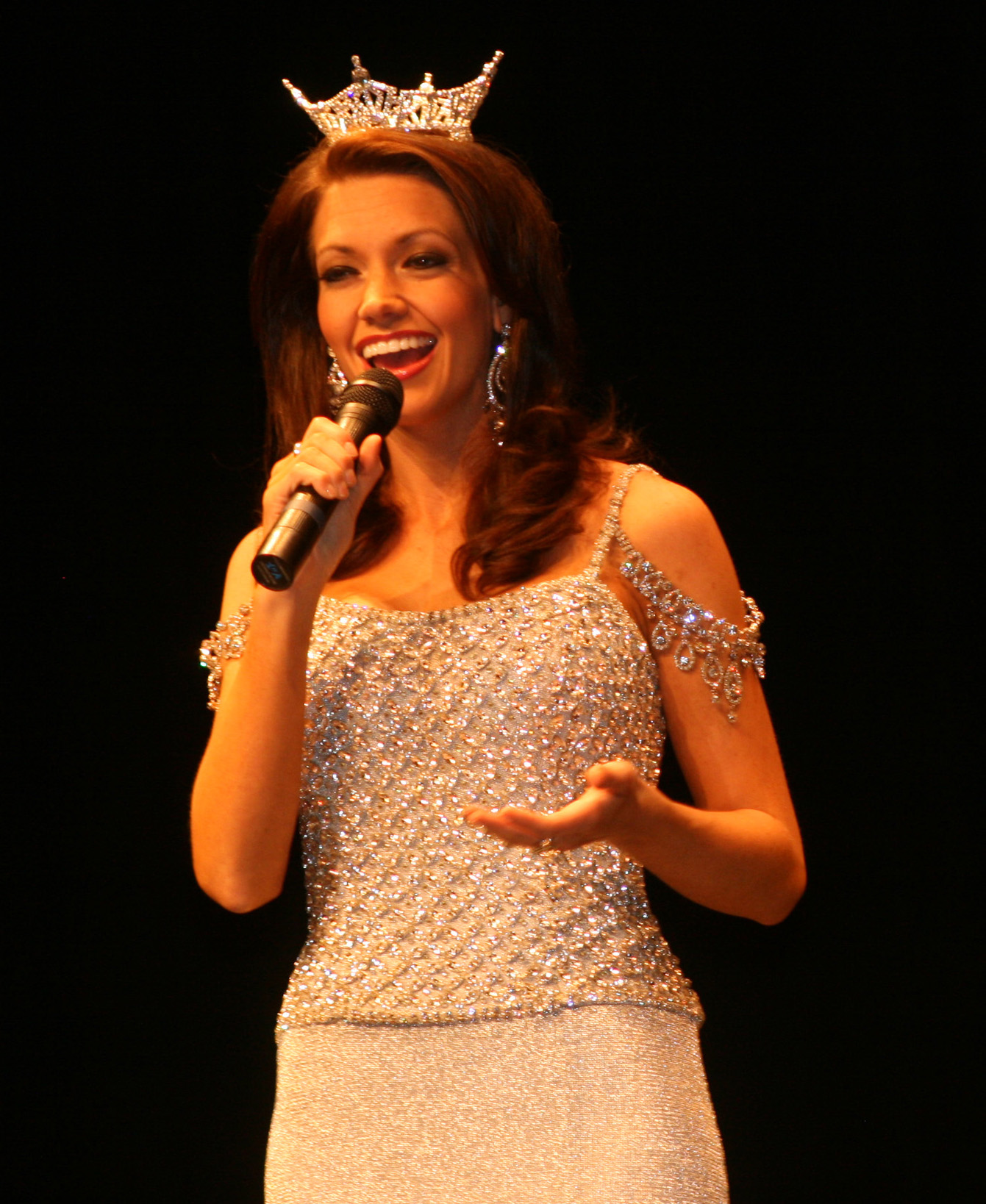
Sarah Slocum,
Miss Arkansas 2009

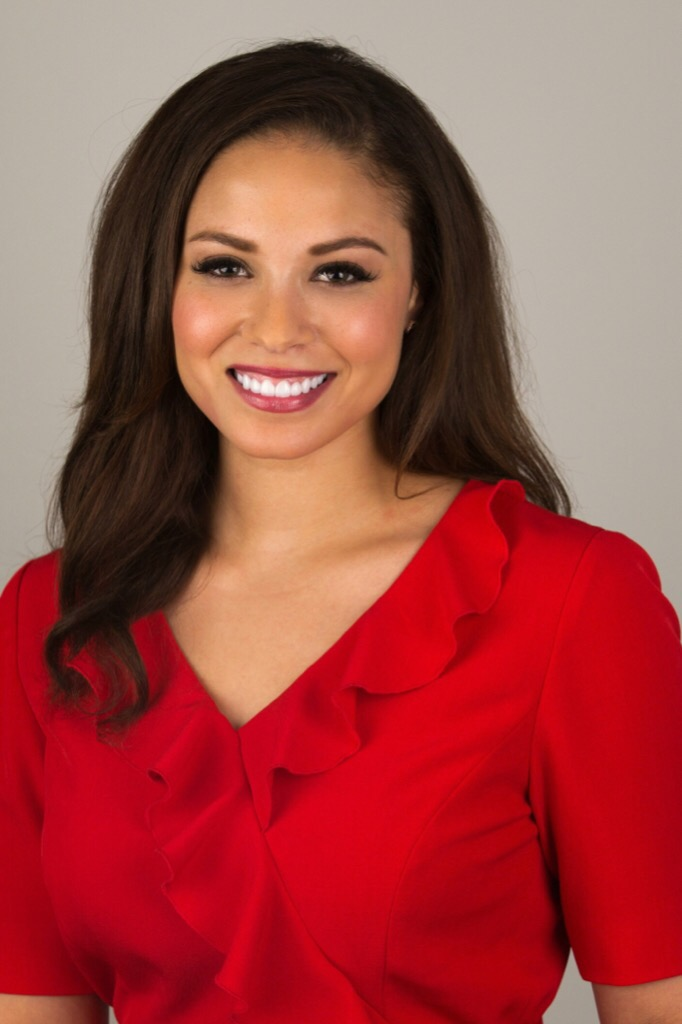
Alyse Eady,
Miss Arkansas 2010

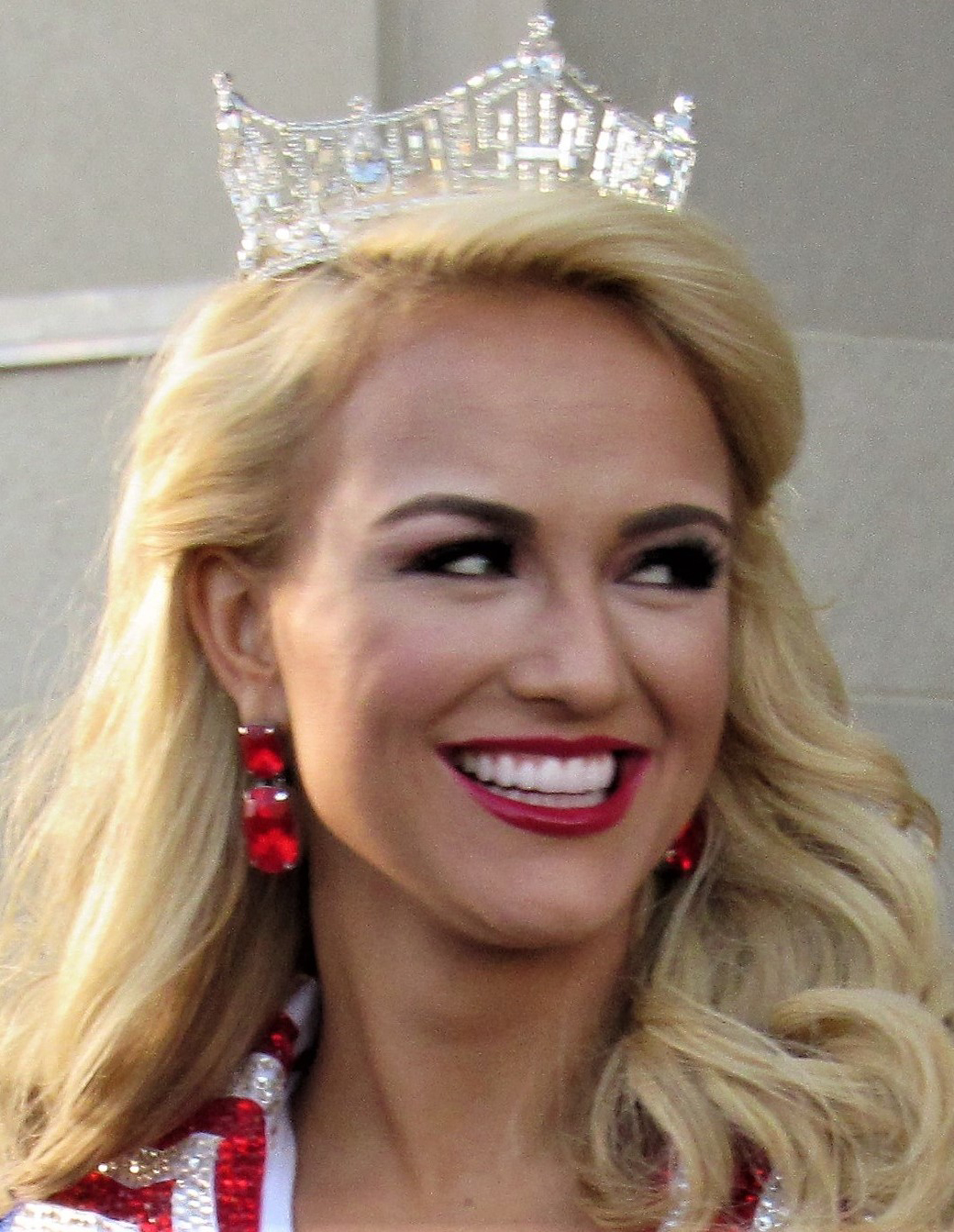
Savvy Shields,
Miss Arkansas 2016 and Miss America 2017

== Results summary ==
The following is a visual summary of the past results of Miss Arkansas titleholders at the national Miss America pageants/competitions. The year in parentheses indicates the year of the national competition during which a placement and/or award was garnered, not the year attached to the contestant's state title.

=== Placements ===
- Miss Americas: Donna Axum (1964), Elizabeth Ward (1982), Savvy Shields (2017)
- 1st runners-up: Rebecca McCall (1946), Frances Anderson (1962), Karen Carlson (1965), Alyse Eady (2011)
- 2nd runners-up: Paula Montgomery (1996), Ashton Campbell (2015)
- 3rd runners-up: Mary Jennings (1951), Charlotte Simmen (1952), Lacy Fleming (2005)
- 4th runners-up: Lencola Sullivan (1981)
- Top 10: Dorris Love (1943), Sally Miller (1959), Donna Connelly (1971), Mary Stuart (1983), Julie Russell (1987), Nicole Bethmann (1994), Erin Wheatley (1999), Brandy Rhodes (2000), Jessie Ward (2001), Eudora Mosby (2006)
- Top 11: Cori Keller (2024), Kennedy Holland (2026)
- Top 12: Ashlen Batson (2009)
- Top 15: Barbara Brothers (1949), Sarah Slocum (2010), Amy Crain (2014), Loren McDaniel (2016)
- Top 16: Katie Bailey (2008)

=== Awards ===
==== Preliminary awards ====
- Preliminary Lifestyle and Fitness: Rebecca McCall (1946), Mary Jennings (1951), Charlotte Simmen (1952), Frances Anderson (1962), Donna Axum (1964), Sharon Evans (1968), Paula Roach (1976), Bunnie Holbert (1978), Lencola Sullivan (1981), Elizabeth Ward (1982), Lauren Davidson (2003)
- Preliminary Talent: Barbara Banks (1956), Savvy Shields (2017), Kennedy Holland (2026)

==== Non-finalist awards ====
- Non-finalist Talent: Marilyn Morgan (1972), Joyce McCormack (1977), Bunnie Holbert (1978), Regina Hopper (1984), Lisa Stevens (1985), Patti Thorn (1989), Beth Anne Rankin (1995)
- Non-finalist Interview: Whitney Kirk (2004)

==== Other awards ====
- Miss Congeniality: Sharon Evans (1968) (tie), Rhonda Pope (1975) (tie), Sloane Roberts (2013)
- America's Choice: Sarah Slocum (2010)
- Dr. David B. Allman Medical Scholarship: Christi Taunton (1986)
- Charles & Theresa Brown Scholarship: Ashton Campbell (2015)
- Quality of Life Award Winners: Claudia Raffo (2019)
- Quality of Life Award Finalists: Kristen Glover (2012)
- STEM Scholarship Award Finalists: Darynne Dahlem (2020)
- AHA Go Red for Women Leadership Award Regional Winner: Camille Cathey (2025)

== Winners ==
- Declared as winner
- Ended as a runner-up
- Ended as a finalist or semi-finalist

Year	Name	Hometown	Age	Local Title	Miss America Talent	Placement at Miss America	Special scholarships at Miss America	Notes
2026	Ava Weeks	Conway	20	Miss Southwest Arkansas	Vocal			
2025	Kennedy Holland	Greenwood	20	Miss Metro	Vocal	Top 11	Preliminary Talent Award	
2024	Camille Cathey	Wynne	22	Miss White River	Vocal, "If I Had My Way"		AHA Go Red for Women Leadership Award Regional Winner	Previously Miss Arkansas' Outstanding Teen 2018
2023	Cori Keller	Stuttgart	25	Miss Metro	Tap Dance	Top 11		
2022	Ebony Mitchell	Harrison	25	Miss Dogwood	Dance			Preliminary Red Carpet, Talent, and On Stage Question Winner at Miss Arkansas 2022
2021	Whitney Williams	Conway	23	Miss University of Arkansas	Baton Twirling, "Conga" by Miami Sound Machine			
2019–20 (Note: Titleholder extended to a second full year in 2020 after state and national pageants postponed to 2021 due to the COVID-19 pandemic)	Darynne Dahlem	Greenwood	22	Miss Apple Blossom	Vocal, "Somewhere" from West Side Story		STEM Scholarship Award Finalist	
2018	Claudia Raffo	Jonesboro	22	Miss Historic Batesville	Jazz Dance, "That's Life"		Quality of Life Award	
2017	Maggie Benton	Jonesboro	22	Miss Greater Jonesboro	Vocal, "The Music of the Night"			
2016	Savannah Skidmore	Calico Rock	21	Miss University of Arkansas	Vocal	Did not compete; originally first runner-up, later assumed the title after Shields won Miss America 2017		
2016	Savannah Skidmore	Calico Rock	21	Miss University of Arkansas	Vocal			Later Miss Arkansas USA 2019; Top 5 at Miss USA 2019 pageant
2016	Savvy Shields	Fayetteville	21	Miss Heart of the Ozarks	Jazz Dance, "They Just Keep Moving the Line"	Winner	Preliminary Talent Award	Previously Miss Arkansas' Outstanding Teen 2009
2015	Loren McDaniel	Van Buren	22	Miss Northwest Arkansas	Vocal, "Bring Him Home" from Les Misérables	Top 15		
2014	Ashton Campbell	Hindsville	20	Miss Ouachita River	Vocal, "Via Dolorosa"	2nd runner-up	Charles & Theresa Brown Scholarship	
2013	Amy Crain	Hot Springs	23	Miss Diamond Lakes	Contemporary Clogging, "Game Time"	Top 15		4th runner-up at National Sweetheart 2010 pageant
2012	Sloane Roberts	Rison	19	Miss Heart of the Ozarks	A cappella Tap Dance		Miss Congeniality	Previously Miss Arkansas' Outstanding Teen 2008; 2nd runner-up at Miss America's Outstanding Teen 2008 pageant
2011	Kristen Glover	Stuttgart	22	Miss Ouachita Baptist University	Tap Dance, "Piano Sonata No. 11"		Quality of Life Award Finalist	
2010	Alyse Eady	Fort Smith	22	Miss South Central Arkansas	Ventriloquism / Vocal, "I Want to be a Cowboy's Sweetheart"	1st runner-up		Previously Miss Teen Arkansas 2004
2009	Sarah Slocum	Sheridan	23	Miss Ouachita River	Vocal, "The Prayer"	Top 15	America's Choice	
2008	Ashlen Batson	Newark	21	Miss Spirit of Arkansas	Flute, Medley from Carmen	Top 12		
2007	Katie Bailey	Conway	25	Miss South Arkansas	Vocal, "Feeling Good"	Top 16		
2006	Amber Bennett	Carlisle	23	Miss Central Arkansas	Vocal, "Come Rain or Come Shine"			
2005	Eudora Mosby	Hazen	23	Miss Central Arkansas	Vocal, "Dream In Color"	Top 10		
2004	Lacy Fleming	Hampton	22	Miss Ouachita Baptist University	Vocal, "Last Dance"	3rd runner-up		
2003	Whitney Kirk	Cabot	22	Miss Three Rivers	Vocal / Dance, "All That Jazz"		Non-finalist Interview Award	Contestant at National Sweetheart 2000 pageant
2002	Lauren Davidson	El Dorado	20	Miss White River	Vocal, "It's Time"		Preliminary Lifestyle & Fitness Award	
2001	Jessie Ward	Prescott	21	Miss Texarkana	Tap Dance, Michael Jackson Medley	Top 10		Current executive director of the Miss Arkansas organization
2000	Sara Harris	Forrest City	20	Miss Delta	Vocal, "Unchained Melody"			
1999	Brandy Rhodes	Hot Springs	22	Miss Lake Dardanelle	Original Tap Dance, "American Rhapsody"	Top 10		
1998	Erin Wheatley	Little Rock	22	Miss White River	Vocal / Tap Dance, "I Got Rhythm"	Top 10		
1997	Stacy Freeman	Sheridan	22	Miss White River	Tap Dance, "Sing, Sing, Sing"			Previously Miss Arkansas Teen USA 1992
1996	Melonie McGarrah	Rogers	22	Miss White River	Vocal, "I Will Always Love You"			
1995	Paula Montgomery	Cabot	22	Miss Greater Little Rock	Vocal, "Can't Help Lovin' Dat Man"	2nd runner-up		Previously Miss Arkansas Teen USA 1991 Mother of Miss Arkansas' Outstanding Teen 2017, Aubrey Reed
1994	Beth Anne Rankin	Magnolia	23	Miss Diamond Lakes	Piano		Non-finalist Talent Award	
1993	Nicole Bethmann	Rogers	24	Miss Diamond Lakes	Vocal, "And I Am Telling You I'm Not Going"	Top 10		
1992	Shannon Boy	Alma	21	Miss Diamond Lakes	Flute, Theme from Star Wars			
1991	Heather Hunnicutt	Fayetteville	22	Miss Northwest Arkansas	Vocal, "Born To Be Blue"			Daughter of Claudette Smith, Miss Arkansas 1960
1990	Karissa Rushing	Benton	24	Miss White River	Vocal, "With a Song In My Heart"			
1989	Marci Lewallen	Dardanelle	22	Miss Arkansas Valley	Vocal / Banjo, "Boogie Woogie Banjo Blues"			
1988	Patti Thorn	Hot Springs	23	Miss Diamond Lakes	Vocal, "Love Is Where You Find It"		Non-finalist Talent Award	
1987	Carole Lawson	Paragould	21	Miss University of Arkansas	Flute / Piccolo, Medley from Carmen			Previously National Sweetheart 1986
1986	Julie Russell	Fort Smith	22	Miss Lake Dardanelle	Classical Piano with Narration	Top 10		
1985	Christi Taunton	Camden	20	Miss Camden	Popular Vocal, "Remembering"		Dr. David B. Allman Medical Scholarship	
1984	Lisa Stevens	Arkadelphia	22	Miss Ouachita Baptist University	Flute, "Sabre Dance"		Non-finalist Talent Award	
1983	Regina Hopper	Springdale	24	Miss Northwest Arkansas	Popular Vocal, "You're Gonna Hear From Me"		Non-finalist Talent Award	Elected to the Miss America Board of Directors
1982	Mary Stuart	Little Rock	20	Miss White River	Vocal / Broadway Jazz Dance, "The Birth of the Blues"	Top 10		Later cast as Frannie Hughes on As the World Turns from 1990 to 1993
1981	Micki Petrus	Hazen		Miss University of Central Arkansas		Did not compete; originally second runner-up, later assumed the title after Ward won Miss America 1982		
1981	Grace Elizabeth Ward	Russellville	20	Miss White River	Vocal, "After You've Gone"	Winner	Preliminary Lifestyle and Fitness Award	Previously National Sweetheart 1980 Infamously had short-lived affair with President Bill Clinton in 1998
1980	Lencola Sullivan	Morrilton	22	Miss White River	Blues Vocal, "St. Louis Blues"	4th runner-up	Preliminary Lifestyle and Fitness Award	First African-American contestant to place as a runner-up at a Miss America pageant
1979	Janet Holman	North Little Rock	22	Miss University of Arkansas	Vocal, "Somewhere"			
1978	Naylene Vuurens	Searcy	20	Miss Diamond Lakes	Piano, "Etude in G Minor"			
1977	Bunnie Holbert	Stuttgart	20	Miss White River	Vocal, "Feelings"		Non-finalist Talent Award Preliminary Lifestyle and Fitness Award	
1976	Joyce McCormack	Little Rock	21	Miss White River	Ballet en Pointe, "Polonaise"		Non-finalist Talent Award	
1975	Paula Roach	Jonesboro	20	Miss Jonesboro	Piano, Theme from Summer of '42		Preliminary Lifestyle and Fitness Award	
1974	Rhonda Pope	Hot Springs	21	Miss Hot Springs	Vocal Medley, "Friends" & "With a Little Help from My Friends"		Miss Congeniality (tie)	
1973	Becky Hume	Jonesboro	23	Miss Osceola	Free Floor Exercise & Balance Beam Routine			
1972	Debbye Hazelwood	Magnolia	20	Miss Southern State College	Piano, Warsaw Concerto			
1971	Marilyn Morgan	Clarksville	20	Miss Clarksville	Popular Vocal, "Something"		Non-finalist Talent Award	
1970	Donna Connelly	Hope	19	Miss State College of Arkansas	Vocal Medley, "Who Will Buy" from Oliver! & "Love Is a Many Splendored Thing"	Top 10		
1969	Marilyn Allen	North Little Rock	20	Miss North Little Rock	Acrobatic Ballet, Theme from Exodus			
1968	Helen Gennings	Batesville	20	Miss Ouachita Baptist University	Popular Vocal, "What the World Needs Now Is Love" & "Love Makes the World Go Round"			
1967	Sharon Evans	North Little Rock	20	Miss Ouachita Baptist University	Vocal / Dance, "Mame" from Mame		Miss Congeniality (tie) Preliminary Lifestyle and Fitness Award	
1966	Mary Craig	Batesville	18	Miss Batesville	Vocal / Dancing			
1965	Nita Vanhook	Newport	20	Miss Newport		Did not compete; originally second runner-up, later assumed the title after Oglesby resigned		
1965	Rhonda Oglesby	Pine Bluff	19	Miss University of Arkansas	Popular Vocal			Resigned after holding the title for three months
1964	Karen Carlson	Fayetteville	20	Miss University of Arkansas	Vocal, "As Long As He Needs Me" from Oliver!	1st runner-up		Ex-wife of David Soul
1963	Pam Jackson	North Little Rock		Miss North Little Rock		Did not compete; originally first runner-up, later assumed the title after Axum won Miss America 1964		
1963	Donna Axum	El Dorado	21	Miss El Dorado	Vocal Medley, "Quando me'n vo'" & "I Love Paris"	Winner	Preliminary Lifestyle and Fitness Award	
1962	Edye Addington	Texarkana	19	Miss Arkansas State Teachers' College	Vocal Medley, "When I Fall In Love" & "This Can't Be Love"			
1961	Frances Anderson	Pine Bluff	19	Miss Pine Bluff	Vocal, "I Enjoy Being a Girl"	1st runner-up	Preliminary Lifestyle and Fitness Award	
1960	Claudette Smith	Star City	18	Miss Pine Bluff	Vocal			Mother of Heather Hunnicut, Miss Arkansas 1991
1959	Suzanne Jackson	North Little Rock	19	Miss University of Arkansas	Vocal Medley from The King and I			
1958	Sally Miller	Pine Bluff		Miss Pine Bluff	Classical Vocal, "Caro Nome" from Rigoletto	Top 10		
1957	Suzanne Scudder	Hot Springs		Miss University of Arkansas	Vocal			
1956	Barbara Banks	Little Rock			Interpretive Ballet, Slaughter on Tenth Avenue		Preliminary Talent Award	
1955	Charlene Bowers	Helena			Vocal, "I Want To Be Evil"			
1954	Sarah Martin	Little Rock			Classical Vocal			
1953	Helen Reed	Fayetteville			Tap Dance			
1952	Bonnie Nicksic	Hot Springs			Vocal / Dance, "Life Upon the Wicked Stage" from Show Boat			
1951	Charlotte Simmen	Little Rock			Vocal & Art Exhibition	3rd runner-up	Preliminary Lifestyle and Fitness Award	
1950	Mary Jennings	Hot Springs			Classical Vocal, "Un Bel Di" from Madame Butterfly	3rd runner-up	Preliminary Lifestyle and Fitness Award	Was a featured soprano with the New York City Opera Judged the Miss America 1989 and 1991 pageants
1949	Barbara Brothers	Little Rock			Painting Display & Poetry Recitation, "Old Black Joe" & "I'm in Love with a Wonderful Guy"	Top 15		
1948	Van Louis McDaniel	Forrest City			Monologue, "Spartan Parents"			
1947	Pam Camp	Little Rock			Sketching			
1946	Rebecca McCall	Blytheville			Vocal, "Put the Blame on Mame"	1st runner-up	Preliminary Lifestyle and Fitness Award	
1945	Leslie Hampton	Lake Village			Vocal, "My Man"			
1944	Mineola Graham	Brinkley						
1943	Dorris Love	Jonesboro			Dramatic Reading, "Letter to a Soldier"	Top 10		
1942	No Arkansas representative at Miss America pageant							
1941	Ferol Amelia Dumas	Magnolia						
1940	Betty Benson	Forrest City						
1939	Jean Thompson	Helena						
1938	Lorene Bailey	Jonesboro			Piano, "Dinah"			
1937	No Arkansas representative at Miss America pageant							
1936	No Arkansas representative at Miss America pageant							
1935	No Arkansas representative at Miss America pageant							
1934	No national pageant was held							
1933	Vivian Ferguson		20			N/A		Disqualified for being married
1932	Nina Ruth Hudson	Harrison	14			No national pageant was held		
1931	No national pageants were held							
1930	No national pageants were held							
1929	No national pageants were held							
1928	No national pageants were held							
1927	No Arkansas representative at Miss America pageant							
1926	No Arkansas representative at Miss America pageant							
1925	No Arkansas representative at Miss America pageant							
1924	No Arkansas representative at Miss America pageant							
1923	No Arkansas representative at Miss America pageant							
1922	No Arkansas representative at Miss America pageant							
1921	No Arkansas representative at Miss America pageant							
