= Miss Arkansas' Teen =

- Formation: 1997
- Type: Beauty pageant
- Location: Little Rock, Arkansas
- Members: Miss America's Teen
- Official language: English
- Key people: Abby Houseworth; Lacy Glover (Executive Director)
- Website: Official website

The Miss Arkansas' Teen competition is the pageant that selects the representative for the U.S. state of Arkansas in the Miss America's Teen pageant.

In January 2023, the official name of the pageant was changed from Miss Arkansas' Outstanding Teen, to Miss Arkansas’ Teen, in accordance with the national pageant.

Peyton Bolling of Rogers, Arkansas, was the first contestant from Arkansas to win the national title on January 4, 2025.

Presley Bennett of White Hall was crowned Miss Arkansas' Teen on June 12, 2026, at the Robinson Center Auditorium in Little Rock. She competed for the title of Miss America's Teen 2027 on September 5, 2026, at the Kravis Center for the Performing Arts in West Palm Beach, Florida.

== Results summary ==
The following is a visual summary of the past results of Miss Arkansas' Outstanding Teen titleholders presented in the table below. The year in parentheses indicates year of the Miss America's Outstanding Teen competition in which the placement and/or award was garnered.

=== Placements ===
- Miss America's Teens: Peyton Bolling (2025)
- 2nd runners-up: Sloane Roberts (2009), Laura Leigh Turner (2013)
- 4th runners-up: Dorothy Shepard (2007)
- Top 10: Hannah Joiner (2006)
- Top 12: Aubrey Elizabeth Reed (2018)

=== Awards ===
==== Preliminary awards ====
- Preliminary Evening Wear/On Stage Question: Hannah Joiner (2006), Dorothy Shepard (2007), Sloane Roberts (2009)
- Preliminary Lifestyle and Fitness: Hannah Joiner (2006), Dorothy Shepard (2007)
- Preliminary Talent: Sloane Roberts (2009), Laura Leigh Turner (2013), Gracie Stover (2016)

==== Non-finalists awards ====
- Non-finalist Evening Wear/On Stage Question: Gracie Stover (2016)
- Non-finalist Interview: Ashton Yarbrough (2015)

==== Other awards ====
- Miss Photogenic: Ashton Campbell (2012)
- Outstanding Achievement in Academic Life: Camille Cathey (2019)
- Teens in Action Award Winners: Emily Brewer (2017)
- Teens in Action Award Finalists: Gracie Stover (2016), Ka'Mya Tackett (2023), Presley Bennett (2027)
- Teens in Action Award 1st Runner-Up: Amelia Lisowe (2026)

== Winners ==
- Declared as Winner
- Ended as a runner-up
- Ended as a finalist or semi-finalist

Year	Name	Hometown	Age	Local title	Talent	Placement at MAO Teen	Special scholarships at MAO Teen	Notes
2026	Presley Bennett	White Hall	17	Miss Saline County's Teen	Tap Dance		Teens in Action Award Finalist	
2025	Amelia Lisowe	Bryant	14	Miss Greater Little Rock's Teen	Dance		Teens in Action 1st Runner-Up	
2024	Bella Crowe	Benton	17	Miss Saline County's Teen	Vocal	Did not compete; originally first runner-up, later assumed the title after Bolling won Miss America's Teen 2025		
2024	Peyton Bolling	Rogers	17	Miss Dogwood's Teen	Jazz Dance, "Man of La Mancha"	Winner		Held Miss America's Teen title for nine months
2023	Allie Bell	Conway	18	Miss Ouachita River's Teen	Jazz Dance			
2022	Ka'Mya Tackett	Sherwood	15	Miss Conway's Outstanding Teen	Lyrical Dance		Teens in Action Finalist	Later Miss High School America 2024
2021	Shelby Cook	Huntsville	18	Miss Natural State's Outstanding Teen	Lyrical Dance "Via Dolorosa"			
2019-20	Sarah Cate Lay	North Little Rock	16	Miss White River's Outstanding Teen	Tap Dance, "Shout" by The Isley Brothers			
2018	Camille Cathey	Wynne	16	Miss Northeast Arkansas' Outstanding Teen	Vocal, "Dream On"		Outstanding Achievement in Academic Life	1st runner-up at Miss Arkansas 2023. Later Miss Arkansas 2024
2017	Aubrey Elizabeth Reed	Russellville	17	Miss Lake Dardanelle's Outstanding Teen	Contemporary Dance	Top 9		Daughter of Miss Arkansas 1995, Paula Montgomery Swindle
2016	Emily Brewer	Little Rock	17	Miss Greater Little Rock's Outstanding Teen	Tap Dance		Teens in Action Award	
2015	Gracie Stover	Little Rock	17	Miss Ouachita River's Outstanding Teen	Tap Dance		Outstanding Dance Award Non-finalist Evening Wear/OSQ Award Preliminary Talent Award Teens in Action Award Finalist	3rd runner-up at Miss Arkansas 2018 pageant 4th runner-up at Miss Arkansas 2019 competition
2014	Ashton Yarbrough	Bentonville	17	Miss Dogwood's Outstanding Teen	Vocal		Non-finalist Interview Award	Top 15 at Miss Arkansas 2017. Miss University of Arkansas 2018.
2013	Brighton Barnard	Little Rock	14	Miss Central Arkansas' Outstanding Teen	Contemporary Dance, "Firework"			
2012	Laura Leigh Turner	Little Rock	15	Miss Diamond Lakes' Outstanding Teen	Tap Dance, "Beat It"	2nd runner-up	Preliminary Talent Award	1st runner-up at Miss Arkansas 2018 and 2019 competitions
2011	Ashton Campbell	Hindsville	17	Miss South Arkansas' Outstanding Teen	Vocal, "Via Dolorosa"		Miss Photogenic	Later Miss Arkansas 2014; 2nd runner-up at Miss America 2015 pageant
2010	Mackenzie Bryant	Conway	17	Miss Petit Jean Valley's Outstanding Teen	Dance			
2009	Savvy Shields	Fayetteville	14	Miss Teen Heart of the Ozarks	Dance			Later Miss Collegiate America 2013 Later Miss Arkansas 2016; Crowned Miss America 2017
2008	Sloane Roberts	Rison	15	Miss Teen White River	Tap Dance	2nd runner-up	Preliminary Evening Wear/OSQ Award Preliminary Talent Award	Later Miss Arkansas 2012
2007	Morgan Holt	Conway	16	Miss Teen Conway	Tap Dance			1st runner-up at Miss Arkansas 2012 pageant
2006	Dorothy Shepard	Pine Bluff	17	Miss Teen South Arkansas	Tap Dance	4th runner-up	Preliminary Evening Wear/OSQ Award Preliminary Lifestyle & Fitness Award	
2005	Hannah Joiner	Maumelle	17	Miss Teen Greater Little Rock	Tap Dance	Top 10	Preliminary Evening Wear/OSQ Award Preliminary Lifestyle & Fitness Award	
2004	Alyse Eady	Fort Smith	16	Miss Teen Arkansas Valley		No national pageant Was previously an independent pageant with the winner earning the title of "Miss Teen Arkansas"		Later Miss Arkansas 2010; 1st runner-up at Miss America 2011 pageant
2003	Lindsey Wright	Greenwood	16	Miss Teen Texarkana	Vocal, "I Am Changing"	No national pageant Was previously an independent pageant with the winner earning the title of "Miss Teen Arkansas"		
2002	Kara Luttrell	El Dorado	17	Miss Teen South Arkansas		No national pageant Was previously an independent pageant with the winner earning the title of "Miss Teen Arkansas"		
2001	Chanley Painter	Conway	17	Miss Teen Conway	Violin	No national pageant Was previously an independent pageant with the winner earning the title of "Miss Teen Arkansas"		Later Miss Arkansas USA 2009; Top 10 at Miss USA 2009 pageant
2000	Amber Bennett	Carlisle	16	Miss Teen White River		No national pageant Was previously an independent pageant with the winner earning the title of "Miss Teen Arkansas"		Later Miss Arkansas 2006
1999	Julie Rees	Jonesboro	17	Miss Teen Delta		No national pageant Was previously an independent pageant with the winner earning the title of "Miss Teen Arkansas"		
1998	Emily Wade	Foreman	15	Miss Teen Texarkana		No national pageant Was previously an independent pageant with the winner earning the title of "Miss Teen Arkansas"		
1997	Jenna Williams	El Dorado	17	Miss Teen Arkansas Valley		No national pageant Was previously an independent pageant with the winner earning the title of "Miss Teen Arkansas"		
