= Savvy Shields =

American beauty pageant winner

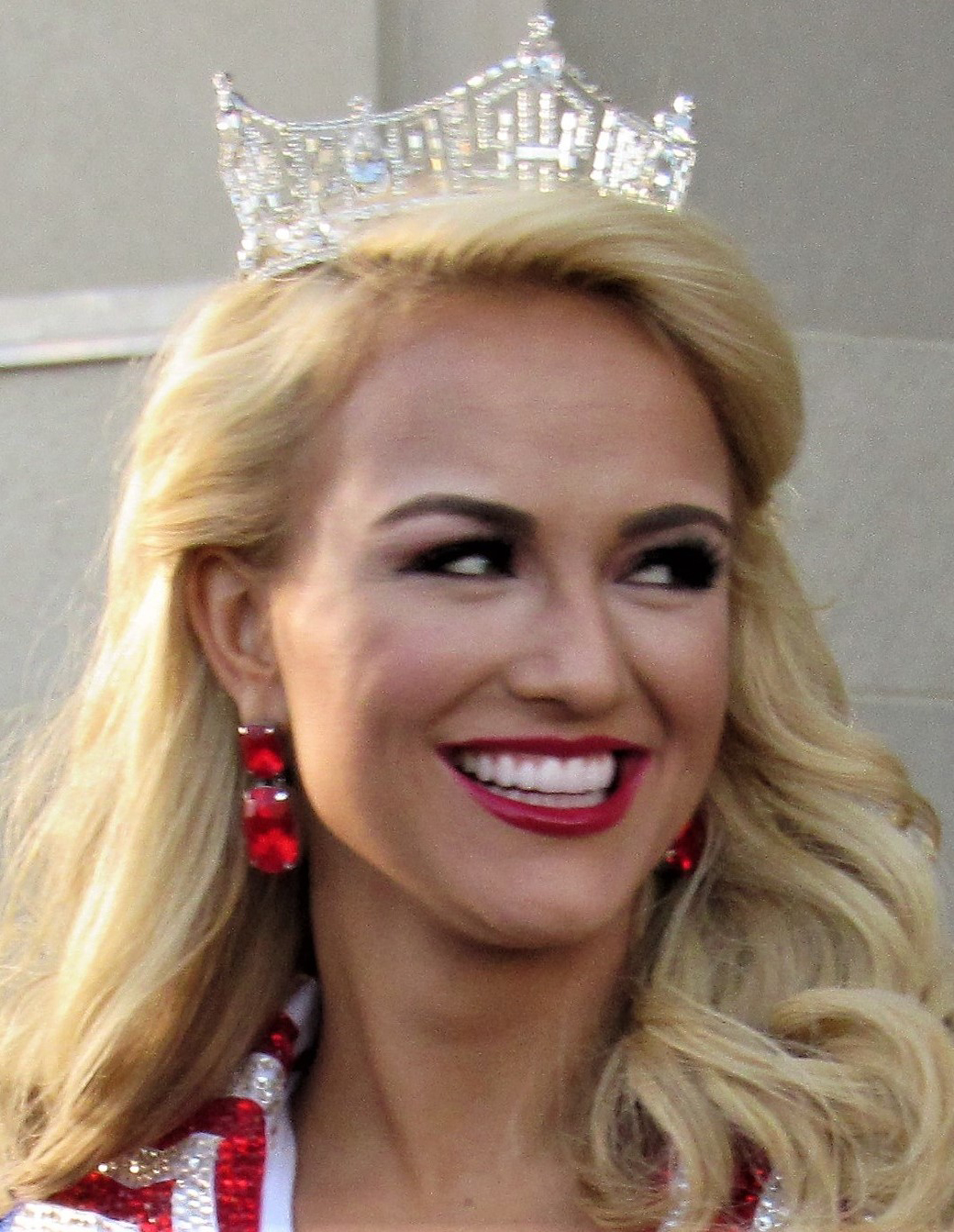
- Shields in September 2017
- Born: Savannah Janine Shields; July 1, 1995 (age 31); Fayetteville, Arkansas, U.S.
- Education: University of Arkansas
- Title: Miss Arkansas' Outstanding Teen 2009; Miss Arkansas Collegiate 2013; Miss Collegiate America 2013; Miss Heart of the Ozarks 2016; Miss Arkansas 2016; Miss America 2017
- Term: September 11, 2016 – September 10, 2017
- Predecessor: Betty Cantrell
- Successor: Cara Mund
- Spouse: Nate Wolfe (m. 2018)
- Website: savvyjanine.com

Savannah Janine Shields Wolfe (née Shields; born July 1, 1995) is an American beauty pageant titleholder from Fayetteville, Arkansas, who was crowned Miss Arkansas 2016. On September 11, 2016, she was crowned Miss America 2017 by Miss America 2016, Betty Cantrell.

== Early life and education ==
Savvy Shields was born on July 1, 1995, in Fayetteville, Arkansas.

Shields earned a degree in fine arts and a minor in business at the University of Arkansas in 2018. She was also a member of the Gamma Nu chapter of Kappa Kappa Gamma at the University of Arkansas. After her reign as Miss America, she returned to the University of Arkansas in January 2018.

== Pageantry ==
=== Early pageantry ===
Shields won the Miss Arkansas' Outstanding Teen 2009 title in June 2009 and represented Arkansas at the 2010 Miss America's Outstanding Teen pageant in Orlando, Florida in August. After winning the Miss Arkansas Collegiate 2013 title, Shields was crowned Miss Collegiate America 2013 at the Miss Collegiate America 2013 Pageant in Orlando, Florida on July 8, 2013.

=== Miss Arkansas 2016 ===
In July 2016, Shields competed as Miss Heart of the Ozarks and won the preliminary lifestyle and fitness and preliminary talent awards at the Miss Arkansas 2016 pageant. She went on to win the Miss Arkansas 2016 title, with a platform of “Eat Better, Live Better.”

=== Miss America 2017 ===
Shields represented Arkansas at the Miss America 2017 competition held at Boardwalk Hall in Atlantic City, New Jersey in September 2016. Her platform was "Eat Better, Live Better."

Shields won the talent portion and a $2,000 scholarship at the conclusion of the second round of preliminary competitions on Wednesday, September 7, 2016, for her jazz dance performance to the song, “They Just Keep Moving the Line” from the TV show Smash. In the final round of the competition, Shields was asked about presidential candidate, Hillary Clinton, by judge, Gabby Douglas. In her allotted 20 second response, she answered, "If you're trying to be leader of the free world, everything you say and do matters, and all of your actions are held to a higher standard. And unfortunately, the media does love to sensationalize everything, and its hard to tell what is truth and what is truly scandal..."

She bested first runner-up, Miss South Carolina 2016, Rachel Wyatt, for the 2017 Miss America title and was crowned by Miss America 2016, Betty Cantrell, on September 11, 2016. Along with the title of Miss America, Shields also won a $50,000 scholarship. Shields is the third Miss Arkansas to win the Miss America title, along with Donna Axum in 1964, and Elizabeth Ward in 1982.

== Personal life ==
About three months after her passing on the crown at the Miss America 2018 pageant, Shields's long-time boyfriend, Nate Wolfe, proposed on December 15, 2017. The couple was married on July 28, 2018 in Bentonville, Arkansas.

Awards and achievements
Preceded by Betty Cantrell	Miss America; 2017	Succeeded by Cara Mund
Preceded by Loren McDaniel	Miss Arkansas; 2016	Succeeded by Savannah Skidmore
Preceded by Haley O'Brien	Miss Collegiate America; 2013	Succeeded by Megan Gordon
Preceded by Sloane Roberts	Miss Arkansas' Outstanding Teen; 2009	Succeeded by Mackenzie Bryant
