= Kathy Shelton =

American sexual assault survivor (born 1962)

- Born: 1962 (age 63–64); Springdale, Arkansas, U.S.

Kathy Shelton (born 1962) is an American rape survivor. The defendant in her 1975 case was represented by then-criminal defense lawyer Hillary Clinton (then Rodham) in court, which caused controversy when Clinton stood as the Democratic Party candidate in the 2016 U.S. presidential election.

== Early life ==
Shelton was raised by a single mother in Springdale, Arkansas.

== 1975 attack and trial ==
In 1975, at age 12, Shelton was raped in Arkansas. The man accused of raping Shelton was 41-year-old defendant Thomas Alfred Taylor, who was a distant relative of Shelton.

Taylor's court-appointed criminal defense lawyer was 27-year-old Hillary Rodham (now Clinton). At the time, she taught at the University of Arkansas School of Law, and represented the defendant pro bono. In her autobiography, Clinton said she was reluctant to take the case and asked to be let off the case; her account was later confirmed by the prosecutor in the case.

Taylor pleaded guilty to the lesser charge of unlawful fondling of a minor under the age of 14. Based on court documents obtained by CNN and Clinton's account in her 2003 memoir Living History, Clinton won a plea deal for Taylor.

After Shelton became aware that Clinton had been the criminal defense lawyer of the defendant in her case decades earlier, Shelton stated in 2007 that she herself bore no ill will toward Clinton for having had to act as her assailant's court-appointed criminal defence lawyer in the rape case, saying "I have to understand that she was representing Taylor ... Hillary was just doing her job."

== Hillary Clinton 2016 US Presidential campaign ==
In 2016, Shelton claimed that she had been misquoted in the 2007 interview. She told The Daily Beast in 2014, "Hillary Clinton took me through hell." Shelton said, "I started seeing where I had really been stomped in the ground. I didn't really know what to do about it. I just figured life would have to go on and I would have to live with it".

=== Release of 1980s Clinton audio recordings ===
In the mid-1980s, Roy Reed, a reporter for Esquire, recorded a series of interviews with Hillary Clinton. Reed had been hired by the magazine to write a profile of her, which ended up not being published. During the recording, they discussed Shelton's case. The tapes were released in 2014 after Free Beacon reporters found them in the archives of the University of Arkansas at Fayetteville. At one point, Clinton laughed in the interview while recounting that her client, Taylor, passed a polygraph test, which she said "forever destroyed my faith in polygraphs." Reed said in 2016, "She was laughing at the vagaries of the legal system that play out every day across America in one way or another."

Shelton said it was after hearing Clinton discussing the case in previously unpublished tapes that she decided to speak out publicly. She said of her interpretation of the tapes, "To me she's saying, they're guilty, and she's laughing about it."

During the 2016 U.S. presidential campaign, Shelton was interviewed by The Daily Mail, a British tabloid, and set up a GoFundMe page to raise $10,000. On the page, she stated that Clinton had forced her to "undergo multiple polygraph tests" and "was sent for a psychiatric examination". Shelton did not undergo psychiatric examination: "one day after Clinton filed a request for psychiatric exam, it was denied by the judge." After The Washington Post published its fact-check of Shelton's claims, the GoFundMe site removed the text about polygraph tests and psychiatric examinations.

=== Full disclosure ===
During the campaign, Shelton spoke out against Clinton in a surprise press conference held by Donald Trump before the second presidential debate between him and Clinton. Also attending the conference were Juanita Broaddrick, Paula Jones and Kathleen Willey.
