= Juanita Broaddrick =

American nursing home administrator and political activist (born 1942)

- Born: Juanita Smith; December 13, 1942 (age 83)
- Occupation: Nursing home administrator
- Known for: Making an allegation against Bill Clinton of raping her in 1978
- Political party: Republican
- Spouse(s): Gary Hickey (divorced 1979) David Broaddrick (m. 1981; div. 2004)
- Children: 1

Juanita Broaddrick (born December 13, 1942) is an American former nursing home administrator. She alleged that she was raped by U.S. politician Bill Clinton on April 25, 1978, when he was the Attorney General of Arkansas. Clinton's attorney, David E. Kendall, stated on his client's behalf that it "never happened", and Clinton declined to comment further on the issue.

It had been recorded in a letter prepared by a Republican rival of Clinton's around 1992, but Broaddrick refused to speak to news media until 1999. In a sworn statement in 1997 with the placeholder name "Jane Doe #5", Broaddrick filed an affidavit with Paula Jones's lawyers stating there were unfounded rumors and stories circulating "that Mr. Clinton had made unwelcome sexual advances toward me in the late seventies. ... These allegations are untrue". She then recanted that statement to investigators of potential misconduct by Clinton led by Kenneth Starr, while insisting at the time that Clinton had not pressured or bribed her in any way. Starr declined to further investigate the issue, and mentioned it only in a footnote of his final report.

Speculation continued that Broaddrick had more to say on the matter, and in an interview with Dateline NBC that aired on February 24, 1999, Broaddrick discussed the matter in public for the first time, this time saying that Clinton had raped her, which a lawyer for Clinton denied to be true. Broaddrick's claims returned to public attention in relation to the 2016 Hillary Clinton presidential campaign and the 2017 Me Too movement. She wrote a memoir repeating the allegation in 2018.

== Background ==
Broaddrick is from Van Buren, Arkansas, a town in the northwest part of the state. She was born Juanita Smith to parents Buster Smith and Mary Elizabeth Smith. She has an older sister. Her father owned the Smith Cleaners establishment. The family belonged to the Episcopal Church. In her memoir she says her mother was physically and emotionally abusive to her and her sister.

Juanita Smith graduated from Van Buren High School in 1960. She attended nursing school at Sparks School of Nursing from 1960 to 1963. She then worked as a registered nurse at several nursing homes.

In 1974, she bought a nursing home in Van Buren. It was known as the Brownwood Manor Nursing Home. Her mother was part owner with her.

Juanita was first married to Gary Hickey, with the marriage happening before she left nursing school. They had a son, who was born around 1969.

== Allegations against Bill Clinton ==
=== 1978: Her account ===
Broaddrick, who was known as Juanita Hickey at the time, first met Clinton when he made a visit to her nursing home during his 1978 gubernatorial campaign. Clinton was the Arkansas Attorney General at the time. Broaddrick wanted to volunteer for the campaign, and says Clinton invited her to stop by the campaign office in Little Rock. She said she contacted the office a few weeks later while in the area for a nursing home conference and that Clinton said he would not be in the campaign office that day and suggested they meet at the coffee shop at the Camelot Hotel (now the DoubleTree hotel) in the city instead. After his arrival, however, he allegedly requested that they instead have coffee in her room to avoid a crowd of reporters in the lobby and Broaddrick agreed.

Broaddrick said the two spoke briefly in her room, with Clinton describing plans he had to renovate a prison visible from her window if he became governor. Then, according to Broaddrick, Clinton suddenly kissed her. Broaddrick says she pushed Clinton away and told him she was married and not interested, but he persisted. As recounted in the NBC interview:

Then he tries to kiss me again. And the second time he tries to kiss me he starts biting my lip ... He starts to, um, bite on my top lip and I tried to pull away from him. And then he forces me down on the bed. And I just was very frightened, and I tried to get away from him and I told him 'No,' that I didn't want this to happen but he wouldn't listen to me. ... It was a real panicky, panicky situation. I was even to the point where I was getting very noisy, you know, yelling to 'Please stop.' And that's when he pressed down on my right shoulder and he would bite my lip. ... When everything was over with, he got up and straightened himself, and I was crying at the moment and he walks to the door, and calmly puts on his sunglasses. And before he goes out the door he says 'You better get some ice on that.' And he turned and went out the door.

When asked if there was any way Clinton could have thought it was consensual, Broaddrick said "No, not with what I told him and with how I tried to push him away. It was not consensual."

Broaddrick shared the hotel room with her friend and employee Norma Rogers. Rogers attended a conference seminar that morning, and says she returned to their room to find Broaddrick on the bed "in a state of shock", with her pantyhose torn in the crotch and her lip swollen as though she had been hit. Rogers says Broaddrick told her Clinton had "forced himself on her". Rogers helped Broaddrick ice her lip, and then the women left Little Rock. Rogers said that Broaddrick was very upset on the way home and blamed herself for letting Clinton in the room. Broaddrick says she did not tell her husband, Gary Hickey, about the incident, and told him she accidentally injured her lip. He told NBC he did not remember the injury or her explanation. David Broaddrick, however, has said he noticed her injured lip, and she told him that Clinton had raped her when he asked about it. Three other friends confirmed that Broaddrick had told them about the incident at the time: Susan Lewis; Louis Ma; and Jean Darden, Norma Rogers' sister. Broaddrick did not recall the date of the alleged incident, but said it was spring of 1978 and that she had stayed in the Camelot Hotel. Records show Broaddrick attended a nursing home meeting at the Camelot Hotel in Little Rock on April 25, 1978. The Clinton White House would not respond to requests for Clinton's official schedule for the date, but news reports suggest that he was in Little Rock that day, with no official commitments in the morning.

Three weeks after the alleged assault, Broaddrick participated in a small Clinton fundraiser at the home of a local dentist. Broaddrick said she was "in denial" and felt guilty, thinking that she had given Clinton the wrong idea by letting him into her room. When she arrived at the event, she says, her friend who had picked the Clintons up from the airport told her that Hillary Clinton had asked if she would be at the event. Broaddrick says Bill Clinton did not speak to her at the event, but Hillary Clinton approached her, took her hand, and said "I just want you to know how much Bill and I appreciate what you do for him." When Broaddrick moved her hand away, she says, Hillary Clinton held on to her and said, "Do you understand? Everything that you do." Broaddrick says she felt nauseated and left the gathering. Broaddrick says she interpreted the incident as Hillary Clinton thanking her for keeping quiet.

=== Subsequent developments ===
Juanita Hickey divorced Gary Hickey around 1979 and married David Broaddrick around 1981.

Broaddrick opened a second facility, to provide services for mentally disabled children in Fort Smith, Arkansas.

In 1984, Broaddrick's nursing facility was adjudged the best in the state, which brought a congratulatory official letter from the governor. On the bottom was a handwritten note from Clinton, saying, "I admire you very much."

Broaddrick said that in 1991, Clinton called her out of a state nursing standards meeting to try to apologize: "'Juanita, I'm so sorry for what I did. I'm not the man that I used to be, can you ever forgive me? What can I do to make this up to you?' And I'm standing there in absolute shock. And I told him to go to hell, and I walked off." Jean Darden, in whom Broaddrick had confided about the incident, also attended the meeting and said she saw Broaddrick talking to Clinton in the hallway. Clinton announced his 1992 presidential campaign soon after that alleged interaction.

=== 1992–1998 ===
Though Broaddrick was resistant to talking to the media, rumors about her story began circulating no later than Clinton's presidential bid in 1992. Broaddrick had confided in Phillip Yoakum, whom she knew from business circles and at the time considered a friend. When Clinton won the Democratic nomination, Yoakum, widely considered to have a Republican agenda, contacted Sheffield Nelson, Clinton's opponent in the 1990 gubernatorial race. Yoakum arranged a meeting between Nelson and Broaddrick, who resisted Yoakum's and Nelson's push that she go public. Yoakum secretly taped the conversation and wrote a letter summarizing the allegations, which began to circulate within Republican circles. The story reached The New York Times and the Los Angeles Times in October 1992, but the papers dropped the story after Broaddrick refused to talk to reporters and Yoakum refused to release the recording.

In the fall of 1997, Paula Jones's private investigators tried to talk to Broaddrick at her home, also secretly taping the conversation. Broaddrick refused to discuss the incident, saying "it was just a horrible horrible thing," and that she "wouldn't relive it for anything." The investigators told her she would likely be subpoenaed if she would not talk to them. Broaddrick said she would deny everything, saying "you can't get to him, and I'm not going to ruin my good name to do it ... there's just absolutely no way anyone can get to him, he's just too vicious." Broaddrick was subpoenaed in the Jones suit soon after and submitted an affidavit denying that Clinton had made "any sexual advances". The recording of Broaddrick's conversation with the investigators was leaked to the press, but Broaddrick continued to refuse to speak to reporters.

Despite Broaddrick's denial in her affidavit, Jones' lawyers included Yoakum's letter and Broaddrick's name in a 1998 filing. The letter suggested that the Clintons had bought Broaddrick's silence, describing a phone call where Broaddrick's husband asked Yoakum to say the incident never happened and said that he intended to ask Clinton "for a couple of big favors". This, along with the discrepancy between the letter and Broaddrick's affidavit, attracted the attention of independent counsel Kenneth Starr, who was investigating Clinton for obstruction of justice. After being approached by the FBI, Broaddrick consulted her son, a lawyer, who told her she could not lie to federal investigators. After Starr granted her immunity, thus assuring that she would not be prosecuted for perjury regarding her affidavit in the Jones case, Broaddrick recanted the affidavit. However, she insisted that Clinton had not pressured or bribed her in any way, and so Starr concluded that the story was not relevant to his investigation and his report only mentioned the recanting in a footnote.

=== 1999 ===
Rumors continued to circulate in tabloids and on talk radio, now with Broaddrick's name attached. Broaddrick was upset by a tabloid report that she had been paid to keep quiet, and decided to agree to an interview with NBC's Lisa Myers. Myers interviewed her on December 20, 1998, the day after Clinton was impeached. The interview only aired on February 24, 1999, 66 days later and after Clinton had been acquitted on February 12. NBC was accused of intentionally sitting on the story and invoking unusually demanding standards of corroboration until the impeachment process ended. Broaddrick and another source said NBC gathered the key corroborating evidence within 10 days of the interview, NBC assistant producer Chris Giglio said it may have taken him 14 days—in either case, while the impeachment process was ongoing. Though the story was unaired, at least one Republican senator reportedly invoked it to convince undecided Republicans to vote for impeachment.

While NBC waited to air the interview, Broaddrick was approached by Dorothy Rabinowitz, who wrote for the Wall Street Journal editorial page. Upset with NBC's delay, Broaddrick agreed to speak with Rabinowitz, and the story debuted on the Wall Street Journal's editorial page on February 19. NBC aired Myers' interview soon after.

During her interview with NBC Dateline, Broaddrick conceded that she had denied being raped by Clinton while testifying under oath. However, Broaddrick also alleged that her denial was only to avoid testifying about the ordeal publicly.

=== Clinton response to allegations ===
On Friday night, February 19, 1999, Clinton's attorney, David Kendall, denied the allegations on Clinton's behalf. Kendall stated: "Any allegation that the president assaulted Mrs. Broaddrick more than 20 years ago is absolutely false. Beyond that, we're not going to comment."

When asked about Broaddrick's claims at a news conference on February 24, 1999, Clinton said: "Well, my counsel has made a statement about the ... issue, and I have nothing to add to it." As of November 2020, he has not made any further public statements on the matter, and has not been sued or charged with any crimes in connection with Broaddrick's allegations.

=== Public and press reactions ===
Because there was limited corroborating evidence for Broaddrick's allegation and she had previously filed a sworn statement saying there was no assault, her allegation was not believed to be credible. As The New York Times summarized it in 1999, "There is no physical evidence to verify it. No one else was present during the alleged encounter in a Little Rock hotel room nearly 21 years ago. The hotel has since closed. And Mrs. Broaddrick denied the encounter in an affidavit in January 1998 in the Paula Jones case, in which she was known only as 'Jane Doe No. 5'. Through all those years, she refused to come forward. When pressed by the Jones lawyers, she denied the allegation. And now, she has recanted that denial."

In March 1999, Slate magazine ran a much-cited article called "Is Juanita Broaddrick Telling the Truth?", that gave possible grounds upon which Broaddrick should be believed, or should not be believed, regarding each of a number of key points. On the disbelief side, it was suggested that the five people who said Broaddrick had confided in them soon after the incident could be lying. This argument proposes that Rogers and Darden may have developed a grudge against Clinton; in 1980 as governor, he had commuted the life sentence of Guy Lavern Kuehn, the man who murdered their father in 1971. Skeptics also noted that even if these people were telling the truth, Broaddrick could have been lying to them at the time the original events took place.

Some details in Broaddrick's account corresponded with other women's allegations. In an interview that emerged after Broaddrick's allegations, Elizabeth Gracen had said that Clinton bit her lip during a consensual encounter that became rough.

Broaddrick said that after the assault, Clinton told her not to worry about pregnancy because childhood mumps had rendered him sterile. When contacted about the issue, Gennifer Flowers, who Clinton later admitted to a sexual relationship with, also said that Clinton had thought he couldn't have children. Clinton would go on to father one child, Chelsea Clinton, who was born in 1980.

In March 1999, shortly after the allegations publicly aired, 56% of Americans believed the allegations were false, while a third believed that Broaddrick's allegation of rape was at least possibly true. Similarly, 66% of the public felt that the media should stop pursuing the story, while 29% felt the press should continue to investigate the allegation.

The public and media had "scandal fatigue" from the repeated sexual misconduct allegations against Clinton and, after his impeachment and acquittal, many felt the allegation had nowhere to go. Many reporters had encountered the story while it was being disseminated by Republican activists and felt they had already looked into it. Jack Nelson, Washington bureau chief of the Los Angeles Times, said "This is a story that's been knocked down and discredited so many times ... [E]veryone's taken a slice of it, and after looking at it, everyone's knocked it down. The woman has changed her story about whether it happened. It just wasn't credible." Julia Malone, a Cox Communications reporter, became frustrated by what she perceived as media neglect of the story and held a National Press Club panel on the issue entitled "Too Hot for a 'Scandal-Weary' New Media to Handle?" Sam Donaldson of ABC News said he was frustrated over his fellow reporters' unwillingness to press Clinton to respond to the allegations: Clinton refused to comment when Donaldson asked about the allegations, and no one else would press the issue.

Judgement on the Broaddrick matter has varied among book-length treatments of the Bill Clinton years. While Christopher Hitchens' 1999 book, No One Left to Lie To, argued that Broaddrick's claim was credible and shows similarities to Paula Jones' later allegation of sexual harassment, Michael Isikoff's book, Uncovering Clinton, said that Clinton's lawyers figured that he might well have had consensual, extramarital sex with Broaddrick, but they did not believe he would have raped her, and Joe Conason and Gene Lyons' 2004 book The Hunting of the President argued that Broaddrick's claim is not credible, noting that the FBI had found evidence for the allegations inconclusive.

== Aftermath ==
Broaddrick filed a lawsuit against Clinton in December 1999 to obtain documents that the White House may have gathered about her, claiming its refusal to accede to her demand for such documents violated the Privacy Act of 1974. Her lawyer was conservative judicial activist Larry Klayman, head of conservative activist group Judicial Watch. The suit was dismissed by U.S. District Court Judge Henry H. Kennedy Jr. in March 2001. The judge ruled that the Privacy Act did not apply in this case and that Broaddrick had failed to show evidence that the U.S. Department of Justice had improperly released documents about her.

During that time Broaddrick's business was audited by the IRS, which she claimed was retaliation: "I do not believe this was coincidence," Broaddrick declared, "I do not think our number just came up."

As Hillary Clinton's campaign in the 2000 United States Senate election in New York unfolded, Broaddrick published an open letter to her, denouncing her alleged role in covering for her husband's alleged attack.

The Broaddricks divorced in 2004. David Broaddrick had opposed her going public with her rape story in 1999. Juanita Broaddrick said she also developed a fear of enclosed spaces as a result of what happened.

In 2008, Broaddrick sold her nursing home business and retired, having done well as a businesswoman. She continues to live in Van Buren, on a 23-acre ranch.

== Renewed attention during the 2016 U.S. presidential campaign ==
Broaddrick resurrected her rape claims on Twitter during the United States presidential election of 2016, as Hillary Clinton was the Democratic nominee for president.

In this context, the Broaddrick case has often brought about unease on the part of people who are generally supportive of the Clintons. In an October 2016 recap of the case, Dylan Matthews of Vox said: "The basic answer is that some of the claims [against Bill Clinton] appear more credible than others. There are three main accusers [the others being Jones and Willey], of whom it seems by far the most credible—based on the publicly available evidence—is Broaddrick." Matthews continues: "Given the prevailing view among many progressives—including Hillary Clinton—that one should default to believing rape accusers, the Broaddrick allegation thus poses a problem." Michelle Goldberg of Slate wrote in a late 2015 essay, "our rules for talking about sexual assault have changed since the 1990s, when these women were last in the news. Today, feminists have repeatedly and convincingly made the case that when women say they've been sexually assaulted, we should assume they're telling the truth. Particularly when it comes to Broaddrick, it's not easy to square the arguments against believing her with the dominant progressive consensus on trusting victims. This is a tension that people on the right are eager to exploit."

Many conservative commentators who were typically quite skeptical of sexual assault claims without firm evidence, found Broaddrick's allegations quite believable. As Katie J. M. Baker of BuzzFeed News lamented, "In theory, partisan politics shouldn't play a role in determining whether an alleged rape victim deserves to be heard." Similar observations have been made by Robby Soave of Reason magazine.

The now-retired NBC reporter who broadcast her story, Lisa Myers, said: "No one can objectively look at Juanita's story and not be troubled. One of the things that makes her so credible is who she is—open, straightforward, seemingly guileless."

When in late 2015, during a town hall event during her presidential campaign, Hillary Clinton was asked about the allegation, and she responded: "Well, I would say that everybody should be believed at first until they are disbelieved based on evidence."

In January 2016, Broaddrick shared on the social networking site Twitter, "I was 35 years old when Bill Clinton, Ark. Attorney General raped me and Hillary tried to silence me. I am now 73. ... it never goes away." Broaddrick said she was neither a Democrat nor a Republican, but she supported the Donald Trump 2016 presidential campaign: "He says the things I like to hear." She agreed with Trump's injection of Bill Clinton's acknowledged and alleged sexual misdeeds into the campaign. Although she voted for George W. Bush in the 2000 and 2004 elections, in the 2008 presidential election she voted for Barack Obama and gave $3,000 to his campaign because he was running against Hillary Clinton. As the election progressed, she increasingly aligned herself with conservative actions and views.

On October 8, 2016, in the wake of controversy over the Donald Trump Access Hollywood tape, Trump retweeted Broaddrick's tweets in which she calls Bill Clinton a "rapist" and calls Hillary Clinton's actions "horrific". On October 9 Broaddrick appeared on a panel with Trump, Paula Jones, and Kathleen Willey (a fourth woman at the panel, Kathy Shelton, had an unrelated grievance against Hillary Clinton) an hour before the second debate between Trump and Clinton in the general election portion of the United States presidential election debates, 2016. Broaddrick and the others were also in the audience during the debate, as was Bill Clinton, although debate organizers kept them in separate areas. The Trump campaign said it had paid for Broaddrick's travel to the debate.

== #MeToo and further commentary in 2017–2018 ==
In 2017, in the wake of Harvey Weinstein sexual abuse allegations, Broaddrick criticized 1990s Bill Clinton paramour Monica Lewinsky for aligning herself with the #MeToo movement, saying, "I have always felt sad for you, but where were you when we needed you?" Broaddrick added, "I always felt she was a victim. I only wish she had spoken up in '99 when I was going through so much persecution after my interview on NBC Dateline."

Other discussions of the allegations against Clinton also appeared, including those from Broaddrick. Matthews wrote that "America's ongoing national reckoning with sexual assault and sexual harassment by powerful men now has liberals and Democrats reconsidering the legacy of one of the party's most important figures of the past quarter-century: President Bill Clinton."

Caitlin Flanagan of The Atlantic wrote "Yet let us not forget the sex crimes of which the younger, stronger Bill Clinton was very credibly accused in the 1990s. Juanita Broaddrick reported that ..." before recapping the case. During an NPR interview Flanagan said, "And so there were a series of women throughout the course of his presidency who came forward with accounts of things they said he did to them which really mirror the kinds of things we're looking at now in the very worst of the cases. Juanita Broaddrick, most prominently, said that he raped her very violently in a way that is quite like the Harvey Weinstein accusations in terms of the hotel room and the suddenness and the bleak horror of it all."

Michelle Goldberg wrote an op-ed in The New York Times entitled "I Believe Juanita", where she said, "In this #MeToo moment, when we're reassessing decades of male misbehavior and turning open secrets into exposes, we should look clearly at the credible evidence that Juanita Broaddrick told the truth when she accused Clinton of raping her. But revisiting the Clinton scandals in light of today's politics is complicated as well as painful."

Following the sexual assault allegations made against Alabama Senate candidate Roy Moore, Broaddrick said, "All victims matter. It doesn't matter if you're a Democrat or a Republican ... We all have the right to be believed."

In 2017, Broaddrick said, of women who had accused Trump of sexually assaulting them, "I felt sorry for them. I felt like they had a right to be heard. But I also felt at the same time that they should bear investigation, scrutiny and vetting. I think it's only fair for all parties involved."

In January 2018, Broaddrick self-published a memoir, co-authored by Nick Lulli, with the title You'd Better Put Some Ice On That: How I Survived Being Raped By Bill Clinton.

Following the September 2018 allegations against Supreme Court Justice Brett Kavanaugh during his confirmation process, Broaddrick stated the allegations made by Kavanaugh accuser Christine Blasey Ford were "sketchy" and "vague".

In a 2019 article for The Atlantic, Amanda FitzSimons wrote that Broaddrick had said regarding E. Jean Carroll, who publicly accused Donald Trump of rape, that Carroll had "just wanted attention... When you’ve been raped, you have a persona about you—it’s almost like you can sense it. I don’t have ESP, but you can almost feel their feelings if these things really happened to them."

== Political activism ==
Since the 2016 election, Broaddrick has been increasingly politically active in support of Donald Trump, the Republican Party, and conservative groups.

== See also ==
- Linda Tripp
- Monica Lewinsky
- Sally Perdue
- Their Lives: The Women Targeted by the Clinton Machine
