= Their Lives =

- Author: Candice E. Jackson
- Language: English
- Subject: Accusations against Bill Clinton
- Genre: Nonfiction
- Published: May 31, 2005
- Publisher: World Ahead Publishing
- Publication place: United States
- ISBN: 978-0974670133

Their Lives: The Women Targeted by the Clinton Machine is a book by Candice E. Jackson. Published by conservative publisher World Ahead Publishing on May 31, 2005, it recounts the stories of seven women who crossed paths with Bill Clinton at various stages of Clinton's career: Monica Lewinsky, Paula Jones, Gennifer Flowers, Kathleen Willey, Elizabeth Gracen, Juanita Broaddrick, and Sally Perdue.

== Content and themes ==
The book was intended to be a rebuttal to the former president's best-selling memoir, My Life. The author suggests that Clinton's inner circle bribed, intimidated, and harassed women when they fell out of Bill Clinton's favor. She also argues that former First Lady Hillary Clinton's active involvement in these attacks should make women oppose her potential White House campaign.

== News coverage and controversy ==
Their Lives received heavy coverage in certain media segments when it was released, including coverage on The Rush Limbaugh Show, by the New York Post's Page Six, an appearance by Jackson on C-SPAN's Book TV, and an article in China Daily. The Pittsburgh Tribune-Review said the book offered a "cautionary conclusion". The book made further news when Jackson escorted Broaddrick and Willey on a tour of the Bill Clinton Presidential Library to draw attention to Clinton's attempts to conceal his alleged past actions.

Critics focused on its lack of objectivity, with the Boston Phoenix calling it "yet another new Clinton-bashing book" and noting that many of the more controversial stories have not been proven.

Search engine service Google also drew criticism from the author and the publisher for allegedly refusing to host online ads for the book.
