= Miss America 2017 =

90th edition of the Miss America competition

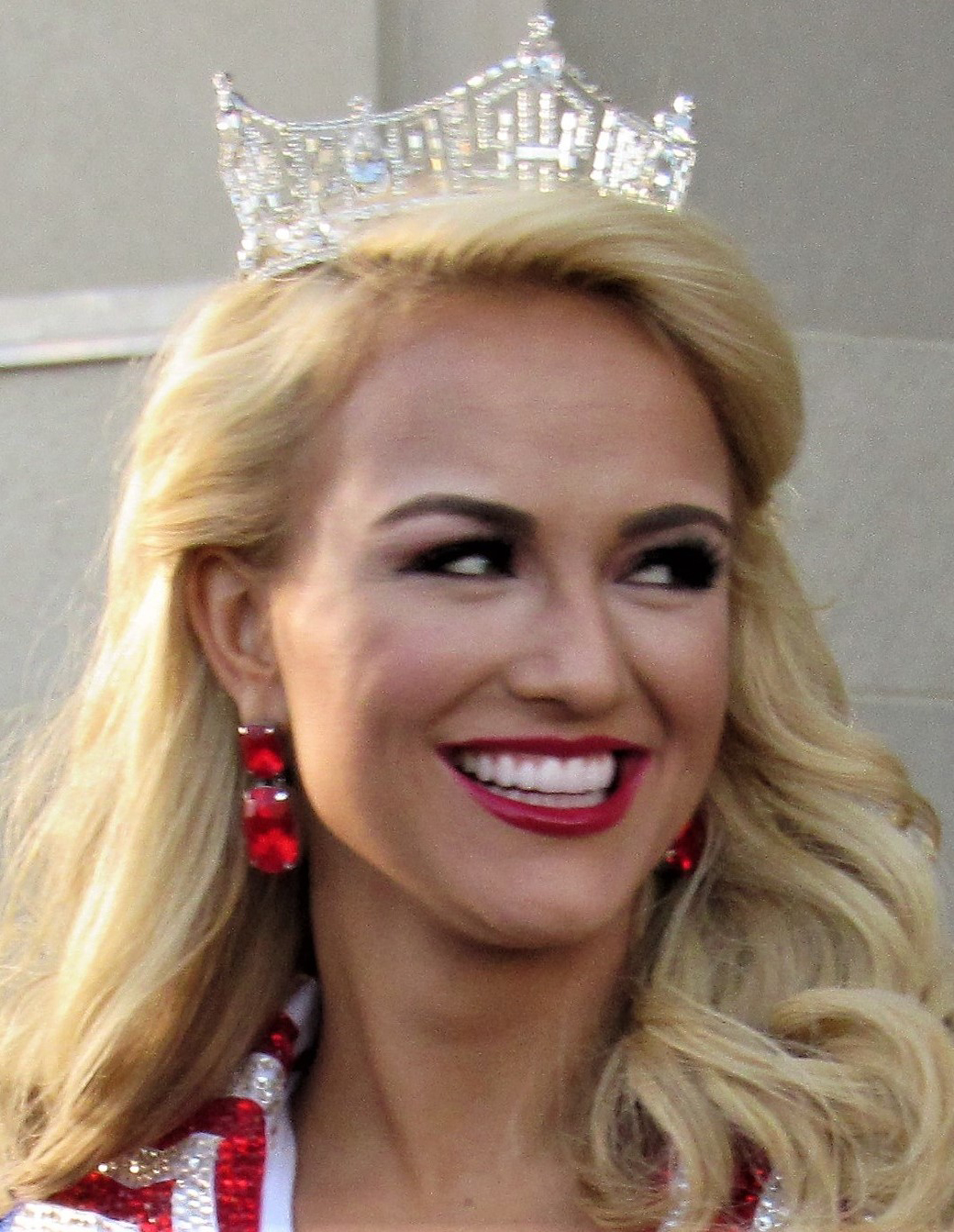
- Date: September 11, 2016
- Presenters: Chris Harrison; Sage Steele
- Venue: Boardwalk Hall, Atlantic City, New Jersey
- Broadcaster: ABC
- Winner: Savvy Shields; Arkansas

Miss America 2017, the 90th Miss America pageant, was held at the Boardwalk Hall in Atlantic City, New Jersey, on Sunday, September 11, 2016. The event was broadcast by ABC in the United States, the first in the network's newest agreement to carry the pageant until 2019, with Dick Clark Productions producing the ceremony.

Betty Cantrell (Miss Georgia 2015) crowned her successor, Miss Arkansas 2016, Savvy Shields, at the end of the two-hour nationally televised event.

== Overview ==
=== Preliminary judges ===
The panel of preliminary competition judges included actress, Katherine Bailess; Miss America 1966, Debby Bryant Berge; musician, Rob Bowman; Jennifer Caudle; television host, Nicole Lapin; strategist, Deanna Siller; and CEO of Galvanized Media, David Zinczenko.

=== Final night judges ===
The panel of judges on the final night of competition included singer, Ciara; businessman, Mark Cuban; Olympic gold medalist, Gabby Douglas; actress, Sara Foster; actress, Laura Marano; country singer, Cole Swindell; and Miss America 1985, Sharlene Wells Hawkes.

== Results ==
=== Placements ===
Placement	Contestant
Miss America 2017	Arkansas – Savvy Shields
1st Runner-Up	South Carolina – Rachel Wyatt
2nd Runner-Up	New York – Camille Sims
3rd Runner-Up	Washington – Alicia Cooper
4th Runner-Up	Mississippi – Laura Lee Lewis
Top 7	Maryland – Hannah Brewer; Texas – Caroline Carothers
Top 10	California – Jessa Carmack; Iowa – Kelly Koch; Tennessee – Grace Burgess
Top 12	Kentucky – Laura Jones*; Oklahoma – Sarah Klein
Top 15	Idaho – Kylee Solberg; Louisiana – Justine Ker; Massachusetts – Alissa Musto

- - America's Choice

=== Awards ===
==== Preliminary awards ====
Awards	Contestant
Lifestyle and Fitness	District of Columbia - Cierra Jackson; Maryland - Hannah Brewer; Ohio - Alice Magoto
Talent	Arkansas - Savvy Shields; Michigan - Arianna Quan; Tennessee - Grace Burgess

==== Children's Miracle Network (CMN) National Miracle Maker awards ====
Results	Contestant
Winner	Alabama - Hayley Barber
1st runner-up	South Carolina - Rachel Wyatt
2nd runner-up	Kansas - Kendall Schoenekase

==== Quality of Life awards ====
Results	Contestant	Platform
Winner	Alabama - Hayley Barber	Sight for Small Eyes
1st runner-up	Kansas - Kendall Schoenekase	Stay Alive – Don’t Text and Drive
2nd runner-up	Maryland - Hannah Brewer	Hannah's Heroes
Finalists
Finalists	Mississippi - Laura Lee Lewis	Mentoring Matters
Finalists	Nevada - Bailey Gumm	Autism Through a Different Lens
Finalists	Oklahoma - Sarah Klein	Supporting Our Troops from Deployment to Employment
Finalists	Tennessee - Grace Burgess	Ready, Set, Read! Encouraging A Love for Reading

==== STEM Scholarship awards ====
Results	Contestant
Winners	Alabama - Hayley Barber; Illinois - Jaryn Franklin; Kansas - Kendall Schoenekase
Finalists
Finalists	Hawaii - Allison Chu; Montana - Lauren Scofield

==== Other awards ====
Awards	Contestant(s)
Miss Congeniality	Minnesota - Madeline Van Ert
Non-Finalist Interview Award	Florida - Courtney Sexton
Non-Finalist Talent Award	Colorado - Shannon Patilla; Michigan - Arianna Quan; New Hampshire - Caroline Carter; North Carolina - McKenzie Faggart
John Curran Non-Finalist; Communications Journalism Interview Award	Nebraska - Aleah Peters
Louanne Gamba Instrumentalist Scholarship	Michigan - Arianna Quan
Women in Business Scholarship Award	Georgia - Patricia Ford; Rhode Island - Shruti Nagarajan

== Contestants ==
- The Miss America 2017 contestants were:

State/district/terr.	Name	Hometown	Age	Talent	Platform	Placement	Special awards	Notes
Alabama	Hayley Barber	Pelham	22	Tap Dance "Dibidy Do" by Club des Belugas	Sight for Small Eyes		Quality of Life Award Winner STEM Scholarship Award Children's Miracle Network Hospitals National Maker Award	Contestant at National Sweetheart 2013 pageant
Alaska	Kendall Bautista	Eagle River	23	Piano "Tarantelle" by Frédéric Chopin	The Power of One - Making a Difference			Previously Miss Alaska USA 2014
Arizona	Katelyn Niemiec	Scottsdale	22	Twirl Routine "Wings" by Macklemore & Ryan Lewis	Bullying S.T.O.P.S. Here			Previously Miss Arizona's Outstanding Teen 2009 Contestant at National Sweetheart 2013 pageant
Arkansas	Savvy Shields	Fayetteville	21	Jazz Dance "They Just Keep Moving the Line" from the television show Smash	Eat Better, Live Better	Miss America 2017	Preliminary Talent Award	Previously Miss Arkansas' Outstanding Teen 2009 Previously Miss Collegiate America 2013
California	Jessa Carmack	Santa Clara	22	Gymnastics Dance, "Little Less Conversation" by Elvis Presley	Building a Healthy Future by Instilling a Health Lifestyle for Our Youth	Top 10		Previously Miss California's Outstanding Teen 2011 Top 15 at Miss America's Outstanding Teen 2012 pageant
Colorado	Shannon Ebony Patilla	Denver	24	R&B / Soul Vocal "Something's Gotta Hold On Me" by Etta James	Learning Through Serving		Non-finalist Talent Award	
Connecticut	Alyssa Rae Taglia	Wolcott	22	Tap Dance	"Smiles for Seniors" - Enriching the Lives of Seniors Across America			Previously Miss Connecticut Teen USA 2010
Delaware	Amanda Debus	Middletown	24	Contemporary Ballet "Fight Song"	All Aware, Allergy Awareness			Previously Miss Delaware's Outstanding Teen 2008 Previously Miss Delaware Teen USA 2011
District of Columbia	Cierra Dena'e Jackson	Columbus, GA	24	Gospel Vocal, "Alabaster Box" by CeCe Winans	Behind the Frontline: Supporting Military Children		Preliminary Lifestyle & Fitness Award	Later Miss District of Columbia USA 2020 and top 16 at Miss USA 2020
Florida	Courtney Sexton	Starke	23	Modern Dance "I Got Love"	Get Up! Get Moving! Volunteer!		Non-finalist Interview Award	Previously Miss Florida's Outstanding Teen 2008 Top 10 at National Sweetheart 2015 pageant
Georgia	Patricia Ford	Johns Creek	20	Ballet en Pointe "Explosive" by Bond	Promoting Children's Miracle Network Hospitals		Women in Business Scholarship Award	1st runner-up at National Sweetheart 2015 pageant
Hawaii	Allison Chu	Kahala	22	Operatic vocal "O Mio Babbino Caro" from Gianni Schicchi	Safe in the Sun		STEM Scholarship Finalist	Sister of Miss Hawaii Teen USA 2010, Julianne Chu Later Miss Hawaii USA 2021
Idaho	Kylee Solberg	Coeur d'Alene	21	Classical Ballet en Pointe to Don Quixote	Our Words Have Power	Top 15		Previously National Sweetheart 2015
Illinois	Jaryn Franklin	East Moline	23	Jazz Vocal, "Dream a Little Dream of Me"	Advocating for Individuals with Disabilities		STEM Scholarship Award	
Indiana	Brianna DeCamp	Kendallville	22	Tap Dance, "Dr. Jazz" from Jelly Last Jam	Ray of Hope: Medical Missions			Previously Miss Indiana's Outstanding Teen 2011
Iowa	Kelly Koch	Waukee	20	Ballet en pointe, "Curse of the Black Pearl"	Pinky Swear Foundation	Top 10		
Kansas	Kendall Ellen Schoenekase	Overland Park	22	Vocal, "Ain't no Sunshine" by Bill Withers	Stay Alive - Don't Text and Drive		Quality of Life Award 1st runner-up STEM Scholarship Award Children Miracle Network National Miracle Maker 2nd runner-up	Previously Miss Missouri United States 2010
Kentucky	Laura Katherine Jones	Fisherville	23	Violin, "Smooth Criminal" by Michael Jackson	W.A.I.T.	Top 12	America's Choice	Previously Miss Kentucky's Outstanding Teen 2010 Top 10 at Miss America's Outstanding Teen 2011
Louisiana	Justine Ker	Choudrant	22	Classical Piano	A Beautiful Mind: Promoting Positive Mental Health	Top 15		Previously Miss Louisiana's Outstanding Teen 2011
Maine	Marybeth Noonan	Raymond	20	Show Tune Vocal, "I Got Rhythm" from Girl Crazy	"Be Their Voice" - Fundraising for Childhood Cancer Research and Providing Assistance for Families Affected			Previously Miss Maine's Outstanding Teen 2010 Contestant at National Sweetheart 2015 pageant
Maryland	Hannah Brewer	Manchester	18	Vocal "God Bless America"	Hannah's Heroes	Top 7	Quality of Life Award 2nd runner-up Preliminary Lifestyle & Fitness Award	Previously Miss Maryland Teen USA 2013; Top 16 at Miss Teen USA 2013 Sister of Miss Pennsylvania 2005, Nicole Brewer
Massachusetts	Alissa Musto	Rehoboth	21	Piano	Changing Keys - Connecting Kids with Keyboards	Top 15		
Michigan	Arianna Quan	Bloomfield Hills	23	Classical Piano, Mily Balalkirev's transcription of Mikhail Glinka's "L'Alouette (The Lark)"	Being American: Immigration and Citizenship Education		Louanne Gamba Instrumentalist Scholarship Non-finalist Talent Award Preliminary Talent Award	
Minnesota	Madeline Taylor Van Ert	Rochester	19	Piano/Vocal, "What a Wonderful World"	Fine Arts for Kids		Miss Congeniality	Top 10 at National Sweetheart 2015 pageant
Mississippi	Laura Lee Lewis	Brookhaven	23	Show Tune Vocal, "A Piece of Sky" by Barbra Streisand from "Yentl"	Mentoring Matters	4th runner-up	Quality of Life Award Finalist	Previously Miss Mississippi's Outstanding Teen 2009 3rd runner-up at National Sweetheart 2014 pageant
Missouri	Erin O'Flaherty	St. Louis	23	Vocal, "Mad Hatter", from Wonderland: Alice's New Musical Adventure	Suicide Prevention: We're All Responsible			First openly gay contestant to compete at Miss America
Montana	Lauren Scofield	Havre	22	Piano, "Moonlight Sonata" by Beethoven	Planting the Seeds of STEM		STEM Scholarship Finalist	Niece of Miss Montana 1986, Kamala Compton
Nebraska	Aleah Peters	Omaha	22	Baton Twirling "Wings"	Cyber-bullying Prevention - Make Kindness Viral		John Curran Non-finalist Communications Journalism Interview Award	
Nevada	Bailey Gumm	Minden	20	Tap Dance "Sax" by Fleur East	Autism Through a Different Lens		Quality of Life Award Finalist	Previously Miss Nevada's Outstanding Teen 2011 Contestant at National Sweetheart 2014 pageant
New Hampshire	Caroline Carter	Dover	18	Vocal, "I Dreamed a Dream" from Les Misérables	1, 2, We: Diabetes Advocacy		Non-finalist Talent Award	Previously Miss New Hampshire's Outstanding Teen 2014
New Jersey	Brenna Weick	Mantua Township	22	Vocal	A World of Difference: Navigating the Cybersphere			Previously Miss New Jersey's Outstanding Teen 2009; 1st runner-up at Miss America's Outstanding Teen 2010 pageant Top 10 at National Sweetheart 2013 pageant
New Mexico	Stephanie Michelle Chavez	Albuquerque	23	Vocal, "That's Life" by Frank Sinatra	Stephanie's Ponytail - How I Learned to Read			Contestant at National Sweetheart 2015 pageant
New York	Camille Sims	Ithaca	23	Vocal, "Sway"	Encouraging Wellness and Fostering Food Dignity	2nd runner-up		Previously Miss Georgia's Outstanding Teen 2010; 2nd runner-up at Miss America's Outstanding Teen 2011 pageant 4th runner-up at Miss Georgia 2015 pageant
North Carolina	McKenzie Faggart	Concord	21	Lyrical Dance, "Rise Up"	The SAFE Project		Non-finalist Talent Award	Previously Miss North Carolina's Outstanding Teen 2011
North Dakota	Macy Christianson	Minot	20	Contemporary Ballet	You Decide the Road Ahead: Don't Drink and Drive			Later Miss North Dakota USA 2020
Ohio	Alice Louisa Magoto	Cincinnati	18	Vocal, "Astonishing" from Little Women	Beauty Unedited - Redefining Beauty for the Next Generation		Preliminary Lifestyle & Fitness Award	Later Miss Ohio USA 2019 and Top 10 at Miss USA 2019
Oklahoma	Sarah Klein	Tulsa	24	Piano	Supporting our Troops from Deployment to Employment	Top 12	Quality of Life Award Finalist	2nd runner-up at National Sweetheart 2015 pageant
Oregon	Alexis Mather	Astoria	21	Bravura Performance "Nessun Dorma" from Giacomo Puccini's Turandot	Mentoring to Develop Leaders			
Pennsylvania	Samantha Lambert	Pittsburgh	22	Acrobatic Dance	Heads Up: Brain Injury Awareness			
Puerto Rico	Carole Rigual	Bayamón	22	Monologue, "Crossroads"	Children Victims of Sexual Abuse			Top 30 at Nuestra Belleza Latina 2013
Rhode Island	Shruti Nagarajan	Providence	24	Bollywood-fusion dance	Upward Mobility: College Access for Low Income and Minority Students		Women in Business Scholarship Award	
South Carolina	Rachel Wyatt	Clemson	21	Jazz Dance, "Something in the Water" by Carrie Underwood	Autism Speaks	1st runner-up	CMN Miracle Maker Award 1st runner-up	Previously Miss South Carolina Teen 2012 Previously Miss America's Outstanding Teen 2013
South Dakota	Julia Olson	Sioux Falls	23	Operatic Vocal "Omio Bino Caro"	Worth It			Contestant at National Sweetheart 2015 pageant
Tennessee	Grace Burgess	Memphis	22	Vocal "Desperado" by The Eagles	Ready, Set, Read! Encouraging a Love for Reading	Top 10	Preliminary Talent Award Quality of Life Award Finalist	Contestant at National Sweetheart 2015 pageant
Texas	Caroline Carothers	San Antonio	20	Baton Twirling, "Hot Honey Rag" from Chicago	With + Math = I Can	Top 7		
Utah	Lauren Wilson	Pleasant Grove	21	Dance, "Libertango"	With Help Comes Hope: Suicide Awareness and Prevention			
Vermont	Rylee Field	Montpelier	24	Spoken Word Poetry, "Mockingbird" by Rives	Find a Happy Place - Positive Mental Health and Wellness			
Virginia	Michaela Gabriella Sigmon	Chesapeake	21	Tap Dance	Making it Matter			
Washington	Alicia Nicole Cooper	Vancouver	21	Tap Dance "Let's Get Loud" by Jennifer Lopez	Live on Purpose: Defining Your Legacy	3rd runner-up		
West Virginia	Morgan Breeden	Charles Town	21	Piano, "From Hurt to Heart" (Original composition)	Bullies Beware: I Have a Lion in My Heart			
Wisconsin	Courtney Jean Pelot	Manitowoc	22	Jazz Dance, "Burnin' Up" by Jesse J. Cornish	Open Books, Open Opportunity: Promoting Literacy in Our Communities			
Wyoming	Jordyn Hall	Laramie	23	Lyrical/Jazz dance	Shatter the Silence - Stop the Violence			
