= Sally Perdue =

American beauty pageant contestant

Sally Perdue (also known as Sally Miller and Myra Belle Miller) is a former 1958 Miss Arkansas and Little Rock radio talk show host. She was a top-10 finalist in the 1958 Miss America pageant.

== Biography ==
Miller is a 1960 graduate of Lindenwood College.

Fulfilling a childhood dream, Perdue traveled the length of the Great Wall of China on foot in 1990.

She was awarded Lindenwood's 1991 Alumni Merit Award for professional accomplishment.

In 1994, Perdue stated that she had had an affair with then-Governor Bill Clinton of Arkansas in 1983. She is one of three former holders of the Miss Arkansas title to have been extramaritally linked to Clinton. She also stated to Ambrose Evans-Pritchard of The Sunday Telegraph that she had been asked not to reveal the affair by a former Democratic staffer in 1992, who supposedly told her that "they knew that I went jogging by myself and he couldn't guarantee what would happen to my pretty little legs."

In 2005, Perdue settled a lawsuit over her dismissal from employment at the Friends School in West Chester, Pennsylvania.

She earned a master's degree in education from Regent University, Washington (D. C.) Campus, in 2006.

== See also ==
- Their Lives: The Women Targeted by the Clinton Machine
- Paula Jones
- Gennifer Flowers
- Elizabeth Gracen
- Juanita Broaddrick
- Kathleen Willey

Awards and achievements
Preceded by Suzanne Scudder	Miss Arkansas; 1958	Succeeded by Suzanne Jackson
