= Miss America 1964 =

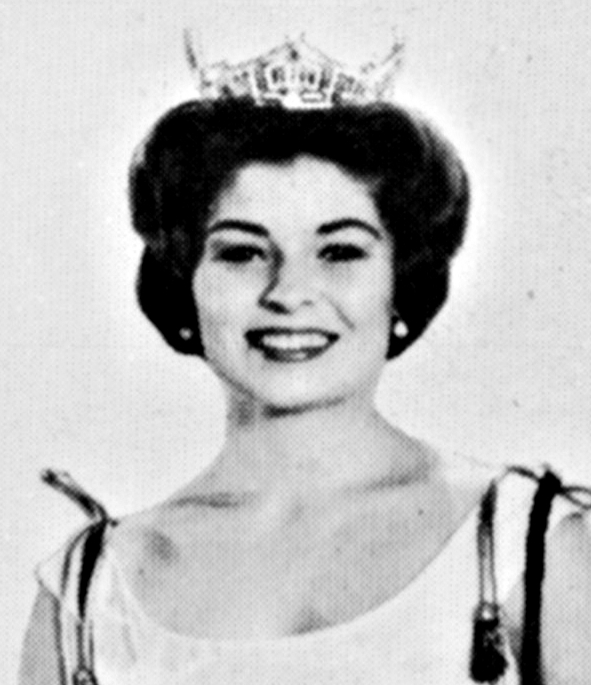
- Donna Axum, Miss America 1964
- Date: September 7, 1963
- Presenters: Bert Parks; Bess Myerson
- Venue: Boardwalk Hall, Atlantic City, New Jersey
- Broadcaster: CBS
- Entrants: 52
- Placements: 10
- Withdrawals: Canada
- Winner: Donna Axum; Arkansas

Miss America 1964, the 37th Miss America pageant, was held at the Boardwalk Hall in Atlantic City, New Jersey on September 7, 1963 and was broadcast on CBS.

Donna Axum became the first Miss Arkansas to win the crown.

== Results ==
=== Placements ===
| Placement | Contestant |
|---|---|
| Miss America 1964 | Arkansas – Donna Axum |
| 1st Runner-Up | District of Columbia – Roseanne Tueller |
| 2nd Runner-Up | Hawaii – Susan Dee Pickering |
| 3rd Runner-Up | Tennessee – Martha Ellen Truett |
| 4th Runner-Up | Arizona – Susan Jean Bergstrom |
| Top 10 | Alabama – Judith Antoinette Short; California – Wendy Lee Douglas; Colorado – Cheryl Lillian Sweeten; Nevada – Cheryle Jeanne Thompson; Virginia – Dorcas Dara Campbell |

=== Top 10 ===
1. Alabama
2. Arizona
3. Arkansas
4. California
5. Colorado
6. District of Columbia
7. Hawaii
8. Nevada
9. Tennessee
10. Virginia

=== Top 5 ===
1. Arizona
2. Arkansas
3. District of Columbia
4. Hawaii
5. Tennessee

=== Awards ===
==== Preliminary awards ====
| Awards | Contestant |
|---|---|
| Lifestyle and Fitness | Alabama - Judith Antoinette Short; Arkansas - Donna Axum; (Washington, D.C.) District of Columbia - Roseanne Tueller |
| Talent | Alabama - Judith Antoinette Short; (Washington, D.C.) District of Columbia - Roseanne Tueller; Virginia - Dorcas Dara Campbell |

=== Other awards ===
| Awards | Contestant |
|---|---|
| Miss Congeniality | North Carolina - Jeanne Flinn Swanner† |
| Non-finalist Talent | Iowa - Carolyn Northway; Kansas - Karen Raye Schwartz; (New York (state)) New York - Barbara Gloede; New York City - Marsha Metrinko; Vermont - Melissa Hetzel; (Washington (state)) Washington - Mardi Hagen; West Virginia - Karen Childers |

== Contestants ==
| State | Name | Hometown | Age | Talent | Placement | Awards | Notes |
|---|---|---|---|---|---|---|---|
| Alabama | Judy Short | Birmingham | 18 | Marimba, "Horst Toccata" | Top 10 | Preliminary Lifestyle & Fitness Award Preliminary Talent Award | Previously Alabama's Junior Miss 1962 |
| Alaska | Colleen Kendall | Anchorage | | Popular Vocal | | | |
| Arizona | Susan Bergstrom | Phoenix | | Modern Jazz Dance, "Tonight" | 4th runner-up | | |
| Arkansas | Donna Axum† | El Dorado | 21 | Vocal Medley, "Quando me'n vo" & "I Love Paris" | Winner | Preliminary Lifestyle & Fitness Award | |
| California | Wendy Douglas | Sacramento | | Vocal, "Summertime" | Top 10 | | |
| Colorado | Cheryl Sweeten | Arvada | 18 | Dramatic Reading from Anastasia | Top 10 | | |
| Connecticut | Valerie Stetson | Milldale | | Modern Ballet | | | |
| Delaware | Diane Beverly Isaacs | Greenwood | | Piano & Popular Vocal | | | |
| (Washington, D.C.) District of Columbia | Rosanne Tueller | McLean, VA | | Vocal & Jazz Dance, "I Love Paris" | 1st runner-up | Preliminary Talent Award Preliminary Lifestyle & Fitness Award | |
| Florida | Flora Jo Chandonnet | North Miami | | Semi-classical Vocal, "One Kiss" from The New Moon | | | |
| (Georgia (U.S. state)) Georgia | Nancy Middleton | Macon | | Semi-classical Vocal | | | |
| Hawaii | Susan Pickering | Honolulu | | Combination of Can-Can, Jazz, & Freestyle Ballet with Art Display | 2nd runner-up | | |
| Idaho | Linda Moulton | Boise | 20 | Semi-classical Vocal & Piano | | | |
| Illinois | Judith Schlieper | Decatur | 20 | Siamese Dance | | | |
| Indiana | Marsha Pinkstaff | Crawfordsville | | Dramatic Reading | | | |
| Iowa | Carolyn Northway | Davenport | 19 | Piano, "Étude Opus 25, No. 8" by Frédéric Chopin | | Non-finalist Talent Award | |
| Kansas | Karen Raye Schwartz | Pratt | 20 | Classical Vocal, "Voi la Sapete" from Cavalleria rusticana | | Non-finalist Talent Award | Karen Raye Schwartz Angle died at age 76 on May 4, 2020 of lung cancer in Ellicott City, Maryland. |
| Kentucky | Nell Owen | Bowling Green | | Fashion Design | | | Former mayor of Prospect, KY |
| Louisiana | Linda Gail Baucum | Springhill | 18 | Modern Jazz/South American Rock-Umba Dance | | | Contestant at Miss Teenage America 1962 |
| Maine | Elaine Ann Ouillette | Lewiston | | Musical Variety Act | | | |
| Maryland | Carolyn Bond Wright | Forest Hill | | Sketch/Ballet/Modern Jazz Dance | | | |
| Massachusetts | Lila Saldani | Attleboro | | Original Dramatic Monologue, "A World of Darkness" | | | |
| Michigan | Kathleen McLaughlin | Ishpeming | 22 | Dramatic Presentation, "Western Star" by Stephen Vinvent Benét | | | |
| Minnesota | Sharon Carnes | St. Paul | | Vocal, "Love is Where You Find It" from The Kissing Bandit | | | |
| Mississippi | Jan Nave | McComb | | Contemporary Dance | | | |
| Missouri | Judith Engelhardt | Affton | | Classical Vocal, "The Jewel Song" from Faust | | | |
| Montana | Roberta Tarbox | Missoula | | Classical Vocal | | | |
| Nebraska | Donna Marie Black | Broken Bow | | Classical Vocal, "Una Voce Poco Fa" from The Barber of Seville | | | |
| Nevada | Cheryle Thompson | Las Vegas | | Folk Singing, "My Lover has Gone" | Top 10 | | |
| New Hampshire | Georgia Taggart | Westport, CT | | Dramatic Reading | | | |
| New Jersey | Janet Bryan Adams | Hopatcong | | Dramatic Monologue | | | |
| New Mexico | Sandi Moore | Loving | 19 | Combination Acrobatic Routine & Drawing | | | |
| (New York (state)) New York | Barbara Gloede | Staten Island | | Vocal & Pantomime, "Guide to World Capitals" | | Non-finalist Talent Award | |
| New York City | Marsha Metrinko | New York City | | Tap Dance, "Just in Time" & "Blues" | | Non-finalist Talent Award | |
| North Carolina | Jeanne Swanner† | Graham | 18 | Comedy Sketch & Ukulele | | Miss Congeniality | Judged the Miss America Pageants in 1990, 1994, & 2000. Jeanne Flinn Swanner Robertson died unexpectedly on August 21, 2021, at age 77. |
| North Dakota | JoAnn Syvrud | Mandan | | Vocal Ballad & Guitar | | | |
| Ohio | Peggy Emerson | Akron | | Semi-classical Vocal, "And This is my Beloved" | | | |
| Oklahoma | Cheryl Semrad Hassman | Waukomis | | Speech, "May I Teach Others to Live" | | | |
| Oregon | D'Ann Fullerton | Roseburg | | Original Novelty Dance & Hula Baton | | | |
| Pennsylvania | Cheryl Lyn Kegley | Salisbury | | Classical Ballet, "Ritual Fire Dance" | | | |
| Rhode Island | Sheila Guamiere | Bristol | | Piano | | | |
| South Carolina | Carolyn Gaines | North Augusta | 19 | Popular Vocal | | | |
| South Dakota | Heather Ann Paterson | Watertown | | Ballet, Soft Shoe, & Charleston Dance | | | |
| Tennessee | Martha Truett | Tiptonville | | Piano, Rhapsody in Blue | 3rd runner-up | | |
| Texas | Jeanne Amacker | Beaumont | | Vocal, "When You Wish Upon a Star" | | | |
| Utah | Annette Bates | Salt Lake City | | Classical Vocal, "Adele's Laughing Song" from Die Fledermaus | | | |
| Vermont | Melissa Hetzel | Burlington | | Popular Vocal, "Fly Me to the Moon" | | Non-finalist Talent Award | |
| Virginia | Dorcas Campbell | Fairfield | | Vocal Medley, "Prés des remparts de Séville" from Carmen & songs from West Side Story | Top 10 | Preliminary Talent Award | |
| (Washington (state)) Washington | Mardi Hagen | Tacoma | | Modern & Classical Character Dance | | Non-finalist Talent Award | |
| West Virginia | Karen Childers | South Charleston | | Dramatic Reading from "The Yellow Wallpaper" | | Non-finalist Talent Award | |
| Wisconsin | Barbara Bonville | Whitefish Bay | 19 | Cello, "Pièce en forme de Habanera" by Maurice Ravel | | Special Scholarship Award | |
| Wyoming | Cody Neville | Byron | | Classical Piano, Fantaisie - Impromptu | | | |
