= Regina Hopper =

American lawyer

- Education: University of Arkansas (BA, JD)
- Occupation: Partner/Chief Strategy Officer The NEXT Education
- Known for: Emmy Award CBS News 48 Hours

Regina Hopper is an American business executive, attorney and journalist.

== Corporate career ==
Hopper is a graduate of the University of Arkansas Fulbright College with a BA degree in Political Science and the University of Arkansas/Fayetteville law school with a JD degree. She worked as an attorney and then as a special assignment reporter for the CBS and ABC affiliates in Little Rock, Arkansas. Moving to CBS News in New York, she won an Emmy for her work on the broadcast 48 Hours then moved to Washington to cover two presidential administrations for the various CBS broadcasts as well as the affiliate division Newspath.

== Recognition ==
The Hill named Hopper on its annual list of top lobbyists. She was awarded the Gayle Pettus Pontz legal award in 2018 and a Johnson Fellow at the University of Arkansas in 2011.
