= Donna Axum =

American beauty pageant contestant

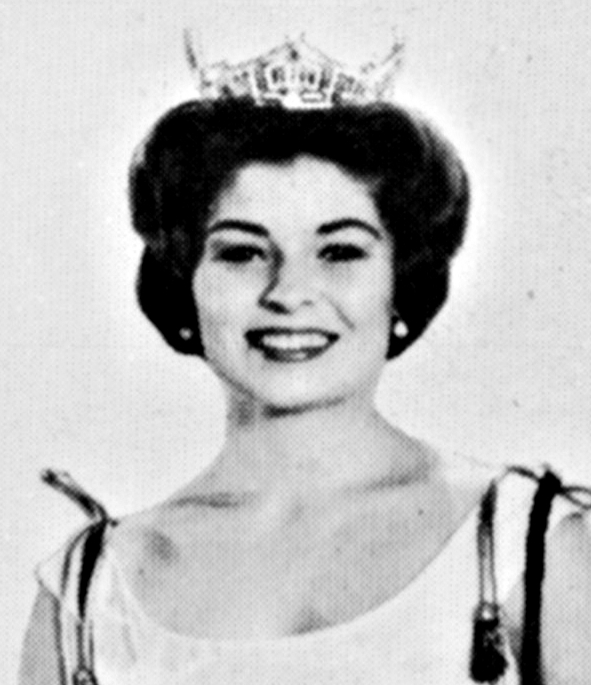
- Axum in 1964
- Born: Donna Idelle Axum; January 3, 1942; El Dorado, Arkansas, U.S.
- Died: November 4, 2018 (aged 76); Fort Worth, Texas, U.S.
- Other name: Donna Axum Whitworth
- Education: University of Arkansas
- Title: Miss America 1964
- Predecessor: Jacquelyn Mayer
- Successor: Vonda Kay Van Dyke
- Spouses: Michael Alan Buckley; Gus Franklin Mutscher (m. 1969; div. 1972) J. Bryan Whitworth (m. 1984)
- Children: 6

Signature
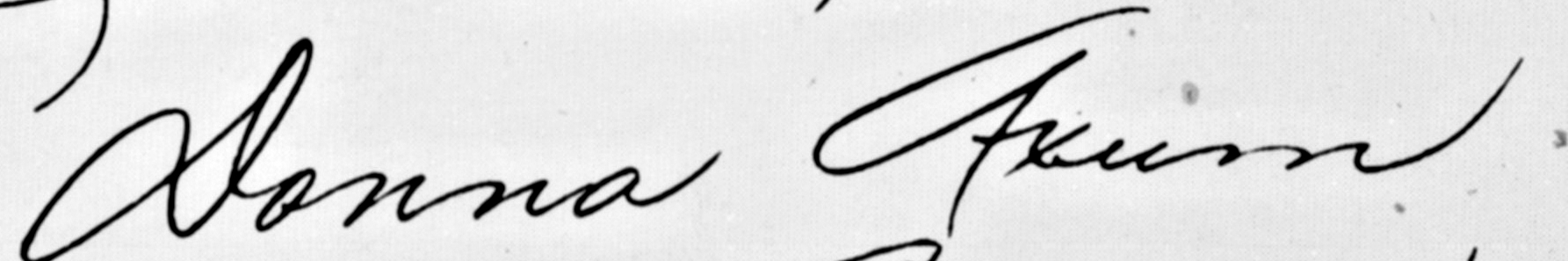

Donna Axum (January 3, 1942 – November 4, 2018) was an American beauty pageant winner, author, television executive producer, philanthropist and model. She was crowned Miss America in 1964. One month earlier she had been crowned Miss Arkansas.

After her Miss America win, Axum taught classes at Texas Tech University and worked in television such as starring on The Noon Show and Good Morning Arkansas. Aside from Miss America, Axum was an active civic leader as she served on the National Committee for the Performing Arts of the Kennedy Center in Washington, D.C. after being nominated by President Bill Clinton, the Fort Worth Symphony, the Van Cliburn Foundation and Texas Christian University College of Fine Arts Board of Visitors.

== Early life ==
Axum was born in El Dorado, Arkansas to Hurley B. Axum, a banker, and Idelle Axum (née Wheat). She had French, Dutch and Irish ancestors. Axum has a sister, Mona. In 1959, Axum graduated from El Dorado High School.

== Education ==
Axum's Miss America scholarship was used to complete her Bachelor of Arts and Master of Arts degrees at the University of Arkansas at Fayetteville in speech/drama, television and film. While there, she was a member of the Delta Iota chapter of Delta Delta Delta.

== Career ==
=== Early pageants ===
In 1958, during Axum's high school senior year, she won the beauty pageant title for Miss Union County. She secured titles as the 1960 Arkansas Miss Hospitality, 1961 Arkansas Forest Queen, and the 1962 National Cotton Picking Queen.

=== Miss Arkansas ===
Before 1963, Axum first competed for Miss Arkansas, but was unsuccessful.

In 1963, before her final year at the University of Arkansas, Axum became a contestant again and won the 1963 beauty pageant title as Miss Arkansas.

=== Miss America 1964 ===
Axum won the Miss America 1964 pageant about a month later. Axum become the first of only three Arkansans to win the title. The other two are Elizabeth Ward (1981) and Savvy Shields (2016). Axum traveled over 250,000 miles (400,000 km) representing the state and nation as Miss America at events.

=== Communications and entertainment ===
Axum held many titles after serving as Miss America: university instructor, author, television executive producer, TV hostess, professional speaker and civic leader. In 1988, Axum was named a Distinguished Alumnus of the University of Arkansas and served on its National Development Council. She also served on the steering committee of a seven-year capital campaign that raised more than $1.046 billion for the university.

Axum taught speech classes at Texas Tech University in Lubbock, Texas, and later worked in television, starring in programs like The Noon Show and Good Morning Arkansas.

Axum was nominated by President Bill Clinton to be a member of the boards of the National Committee for the Performing Arts of the Kennedy Center in Washington, D.C. She also served at the Fort Worth Symphony, the Van Cliburn Foundation, named for the famed pianist from Shreveport, Louisiana, and the Texas Christian University College of Fine Arts Board of Visitors.

Axum remained active at the University of Arkansas, participating in campaigns to help most of the university's fundraising efforts until her death in 2018.

== Personal life ==
Axum first married Michael Alan Buckley and had one child, Lisa. They later divorced.

In 1969, Axum married Gus Franklin Mutscher, who served as Speaker of the Texas House of Representatives from 1969 to 1972 and later as the Washington County judge. The pair divorced in 1972. They had a son, Gus H. Mutscher.

On March 1, 1984, Axum married J. Bryan Whitworth, executive vice president of ConocoPhillips. The Whitworths lived in Fort Worth, Texas. Bryan Whitworth had three children, Elizabeth, Suzanne, and Cathy.

As an author Axum penned How to Be and Look Your Best Everyday: A Comprehensive Guide from a Former Miss America in 1978.

Axum died on November 4, 2018, at age 76 in Fort Worth from complications of Parkinson's disease. Axum is buried at Fairview Memorial Gardens in Fayetteville, Arkansas.

== See also ==
- List of Miss America titleholders

Awards and achievements
Preceded by Jacquelyn Mayer	Miss America; 1964	Succeeded by Vonda Kay Van Dyke
Preceded by Edye Addington	Miss Arkansas; 1963	Succeeded by Pam Jackson
