= Kathleen Willey =

American political aide and activist (born 1946)

- Born: Kathleen Elizabeth Matzuk; June 2, 1946 (age 80); Philadelphia, Pennsylvania, U.S.
- Occupation: White House aide volunteer
- Spouses: Richard Dolsey (m. 1968; div. 1970) Edward Willey (m. 1973; died 1993) Bill Schwicker (m. 1999; div. 2006)
- Children: 3 (Note: Her firstborn child was placed for adoption. She then had a daughter with her first husband and a son with her second husband.)

Kathleen Willey (born June 2, 1946) is a former White House volunteer aide who, on March 15, 1998, alleged on the TV news program 60 Minutes that Bill Clinton had sexually assaulted her on November 29, 1993, during his first term as President. She had been subpoenaed to testify in the Paula Jones sexual harassment case.

== Claims ==
According to Willey, during an early afternoon meeting on November 29, 1993, in the private study of the Oval Office, Clinton had embraced her tightly, kissed her on the lips, grabbed her breast, and forced her hand on his genitals. Clinton denied assaulting Willey. According to Monica Lewinsky's testimony, Clinton stated that the allegation was absurd because Willey is a small-breasted woman, so he would never pursue her. She had asked an acquaintance, Julie Hiatt Steele, to back up her claims to a Newsweek reporter; Steele at first reluctantly agreed, but soon recanted and then was subjected to a years-long attack by Willey's right-wing patrons and brought up on charges by Ken Starr's Office of Independent Counsel (OIC).

According to Linda Tripp's grand jury testimony, she felt Willey pursued a romance with Clinton from the start of her White House affiliation. Willey had speculated with Tripp as to how she might be able to set up an assignation between herself and the president. She routinely attended events at which Clinton would be present and wore a black dress she believed he liked. According to Tripp's testimony, Willey wondered if she and Clinton could arrange to meet in a home to which she had access, on the Chesapeake Bay.

== Investigation ==
The Final Report of the U.S. Office of the Independent Counsel report noted that "Willey and President Clinton are the only direct witnesses to their meeting, and their accounts differ substantially on the crucial facts of what occurred." It also stated that she gave false information to the FBI about her sexual relationship with a former boyfriend and acknowledged having lied about it when the agents confronted her with contradictory evidence. The probative value of this last aspect of Willey's testimony is highly uncertain beyond the unfavorable light it casts on her general credibility. Her claims regarding Clinton do not involve her former boyfriend.

There were also some differences in Paula Jones’ and her grand jury testimony, but in both, she stated she had been harassed. Following Willey's acknowledgment of these lies about her boyfriend, "the Independent Counsel agreed not to prosecute Willey for any offense arising out of the investigation, including false statements in her Jones deposition, so long as she cooperated fully and truthfully with the investigation."

According to Independent Counsel Robert Ray's report, "Willey's Paula Jones deposition testimony differed from her grand jury testimony on material aspects of the alleged incident."

Ultimately, the Independent Counsel declined prosecution, and noted the absence of strong supporting evidence.

According to a book critical of Clinton by Candice E. Jackson, Tripp told Larry King in February 1999 that Willey is "an honest person" who was "telling the truth" about having been sexually assaulted by Clinton. However, Tripp's grand jury testimony differs from Willey's claims regarding inappropriate sexual advances. She stated that Willey appeared excited about the alleged assault. Specifically, Tripp testified that Willey reported Clinton's sexual advances, which Clinton completely denied making. Tripp also noted that Willey stated that the force of the advances took her breath away, which is consistent with Willey's claim that she was not even given the opportunity to consent. However, Tripp further noted that Willey seemed pleased in some respects with what had happened.

The Independent Counsel believed that Willey told a boyfriend that she was pregnant and she had a miscarriage when she did not. On the evening of March 19, 1998, Julie Hiatt Steele, a friend of Willey, released an affidavit, accusing the former White House aide of asking her to lie to corroborate Willey's account of being sexually groped by President Clinton in the Oval Office.

An attempt by Starr to prosecute Steele for making false statements and obstructing justice ended in a mistrial, and Starr declined to seek a retrial after Steele sought an investigation against the former Independent Counsel for prosecutorial misconduct. Federal prosecutors are immune to such “misconduct” actions under longstanding Supreme Court precedent.

In March 2000, U.S. District Court Judge Royce Lamberth ruled that President Clinton had "committed a criminal violation" of the Privacy Act of 1974 by releasing letters from Willey to the President that were written even after the alleged incident. A three-judge panel of the U.S. District Court of Appeals later criticized that aspect of Lamberth's ruling as “sweeping” and “superfluous,” but denied the White House motion before them. Willey filed suit against the White House over the issue.

== Target ==
On November 6, 2007, her book Target: Caught in the Crosshairs of Bill and Hillary Clinton was published by WND Books, an imprint of World Ahead Media and WorldNetDaily. In her book, Willey claimed that on Labor Day weekend 2007, her house was burglarized, with the only thing stolen being a manuscript of her book. Willey stated that she believes individuals with ties to the Clintons were responsible for the break-in. She also filed a police report.

Willey draws similarities in her book between the circumstances of her husband's death on November 29, 1993, and of the death of Vincent Foster, although she does not claim to know that any wrongdoing took place.

== "A Scandal a Day" website ==
In July 2015, Willey launched "A Scandal A Day," an anti-Clinton website; the website was set up by an Arizona-based private detective company Maverick Investigations, owned by Tom Watson.

In 2016, Willey was interviewed by Larry King about the alleged incident.

== Appearance with Trump ==
In October 2016, Willey joined Donald Trump for a press conference before the second presidential debate to air grievances against Hillary and Bill Clinton. The conference also included Juanita Broaddrick, Paula Jones, and Kathy Shelton. She was paid $2,500 for the appearance by a Political Action Committee headed by Roger Stone.

== Personal life ==
While in high school, Willey became pregnant. She was sent to Ohio for the birth, and the child was placed for adoption. When she returned to school, it was said that her absence had been due to a car crash.

Her first marriage was to Richard Dolsey, a medical student. They had a daughter before divorcing in 1970.

At the time of the alleged assault by President Clinton, Willey was married to Edward Eugene Willey Jr., a real estate lawyer. They had a son together. Edward Willey committed suicide on November 29, 1993. Around this time, he owed the IRS $400,000, and stole $275,000 from a client.

She was remarried in November 1999 to Bill Schwicker, whom she divorced in 2006. As of 2008, she works and resides in Powhatan County, Virginia.

Willey works as a freelance writer and lives in Powhatan County, Virginia.

== In popular media ==
In 2021, Willey was portrayed by Elizabeth Reaser in Impeachment: American Crime Story, which focuses on the story of the Monica Lewinsky scandal, and portrays Willey's relationship with Linda Tripp.

== See also ==
- Bill Clinton sexual misconduct allegations
