= Laura Kaeppeler =

Miss America 2012

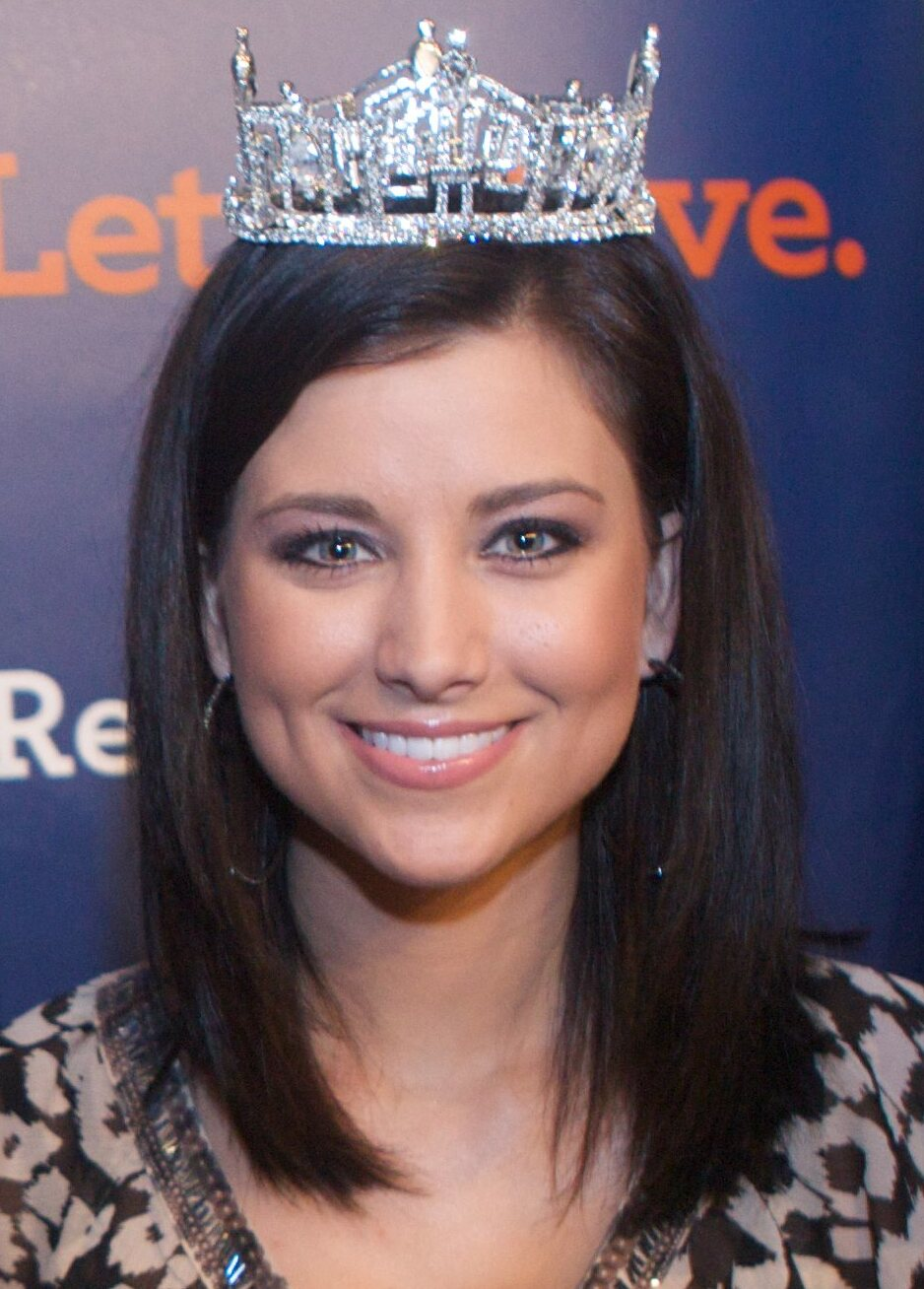
- Kaeppeler in 2012
- Born: Laura Marie Kaeppeler; March 2, 1988 (age 38); Kenosha, Wisconsin, U.S.
- Education: Carthage College
- Title: Miss Kenosha 2010; Miss Southern Wisconsin 2011; Miss Wisconsin 2011; Miss America 2012
- Term: January 14, 2012 - January 12, 2013
- Predecessor: Teresa Scanlan
- Successor: Mallory Hagan
- Spouse: Mike Fleiss (m. 2014; sep. 2019)
- Children: 2

Laura Marie Kaeppeler (born March 2, 1988) is an American beauty pageant titleholder crowned Miss America 2012 on January 14, 2012, representing the state of Wisconsin. Kaeppeler was the first woman representing Wisconsin to win Miss America since Terry Meeuwsen won Miss America 1973. She was briefly on the board of directors for the Miss America Organization.

== Background ==
Kaeppeler was born to Jeff and Sue Kaeppeler in Kenosha, Wisconsin. In 2009 Kaeppeler won the title of Miss Kenosha 2010. She then went on to win the talent preliminary award and was second runner-up to Miss Wisconsin 2010, Kimberly Sawyer. One year later Kaeppeler won the title of Miss Southern Wisconsin 2010. At the Miss Wisconsin 2011 pageant, she won the preliminary talent award, which she tied with Raeanna Johnson, who later took over the Miss Wisconsin title after Laura won Miss America 2012. She attended St. Joseph High School and Carthage College, where she graduated in 2010 with a degree in music.

== Miss America 2012 pageant ==
Kaeppeler was Wisconsin's representative at the Miss America 2012 competition held in Las Vegas, Nevada at the Theatre for the Performing Arts of Planet Hollywood Resort and Casino on January 14, 2012.

In the preliminary competition, Kaeppeler won the talent portion and a $2,000 scholarship with her rendition of the Luigi Arditi waltz "Il Bacio". She chose a platform of supporting and mentoring children of incarcerated parents, as her father served 18 months in prison for mail fraud.

In the lifestyle and fitness competition, she wore a white bikini, and for her evening gown, Kaeppeler wore a black customized Tony Bowls beaded dress.

In the final round, judge Lara Spencer asked Kaeppeler if beauty queens should declare their political viewpoint. Kaeppeler then answered, "Miss America represents everyone, so I think the message to political candidates is that they represent everyone as well. And so in these economic times, we need to be looking forward to what America needs, and I think Miss America needs to represent all." Kaeppeler beat out first runner-up Miss Oklahoma 2011, Betty Thompson, for the title of Miss America 2012 and was crowned by Miss America 2011, Teresa Scanlan. Along with the title of Miss America, she also won a $50,000 scholarship.

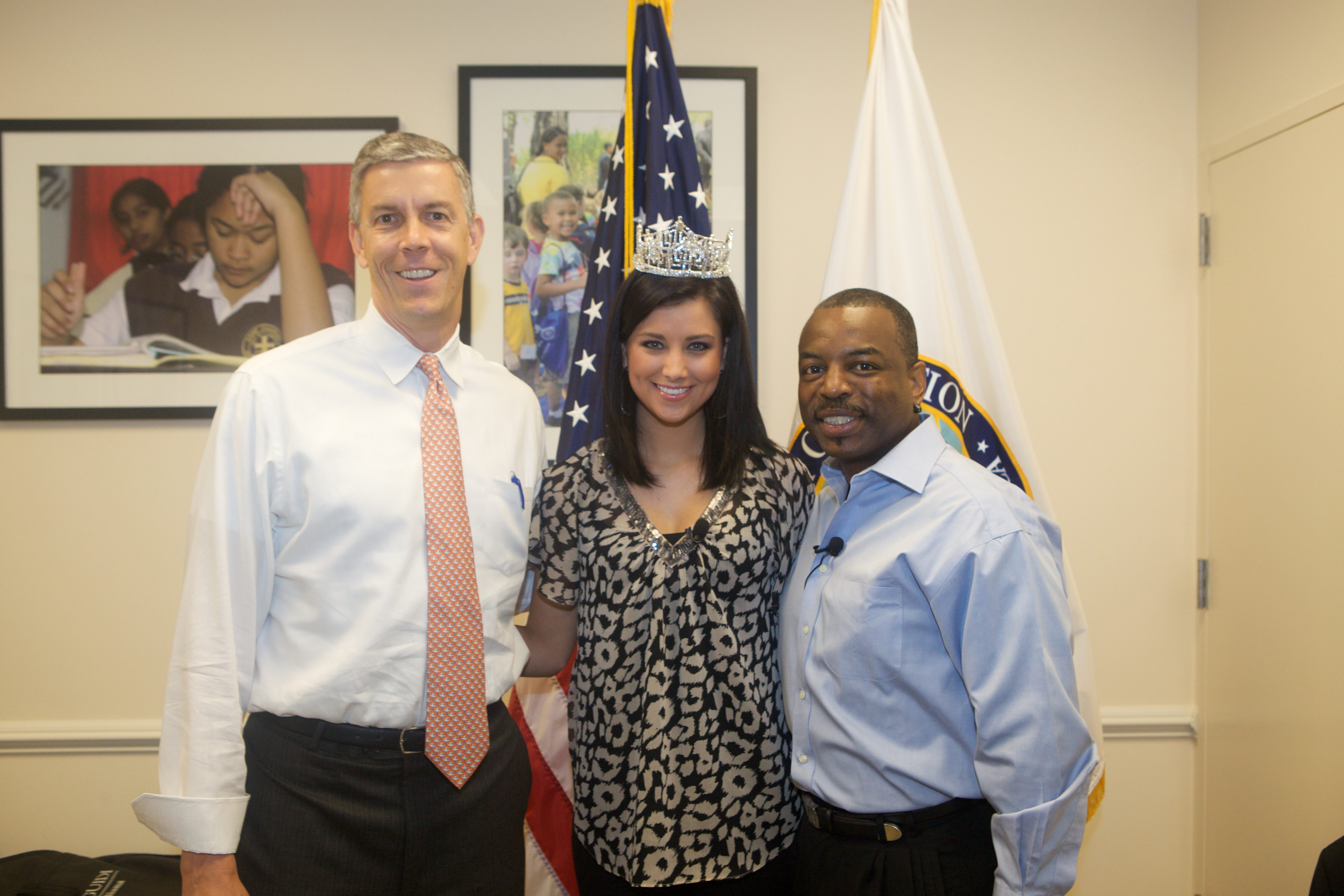
United States Secretary of Education, Arne Duncan, taking a photo with 2012 Miss America, Laura Kaeppeler and actor LeVar Burton at the Let's Read! Let's Move! event on July 17, 2012.

== Miss America role ==
Kaeppeler met President Obama through a joint meeting with the Children's Miracle Network Hospital Champions at the White House. Obama previously met with Miss America 2009 Katie Stam and Miss America 2010 Caressa Cameron during similar events.

== Personal life ==
On April 6, 2014, Kaeppeler married television producer Mike Fleiss, who was a judge at the Miss America 2012 pageant which Kaeppeler won. The couple's first child, Benjamin, was born in May 2015. In early July 2019, Fleiss filed for divorce from Kaeppeler, citing irreconcilable differences. Later that same month, Kaeppeler was granted an emergency domestic violence restraining order against Fleiss, alleging that he verbally and physically assaulted her and "demanded she get an abortion" after telling him she was pregnant with their second child. The Kauai Police Department also began a criminal investigation. Fleiss denied Kaeppeler's allegations in court filings. Weeks later, the couple reportedly reached a $10 million divorce settlement which included Kaeppeler withdrawing her assault allegations as part of the agreement. In November 2019, Kaeppeler and Fleiss announced on Twitter that they had reconciled. Kaeppeler's second child, George, was born in 2020.

Kaeppeler is currently the co-host of the Health Interrupted Podcast with celebrity fitness trainer, Gina Lombardi.

Awards and achievements
Preceded by Teresa Scanlan	Miss America; 2012	Succeeded by Mallory Hagan
Preceded by Kimberly Sawyer	Miss Wisconsin; 2011	Succeeded by Raeanna Johnson
