= Miss America 2011 =

84th edition of the Miss America competition

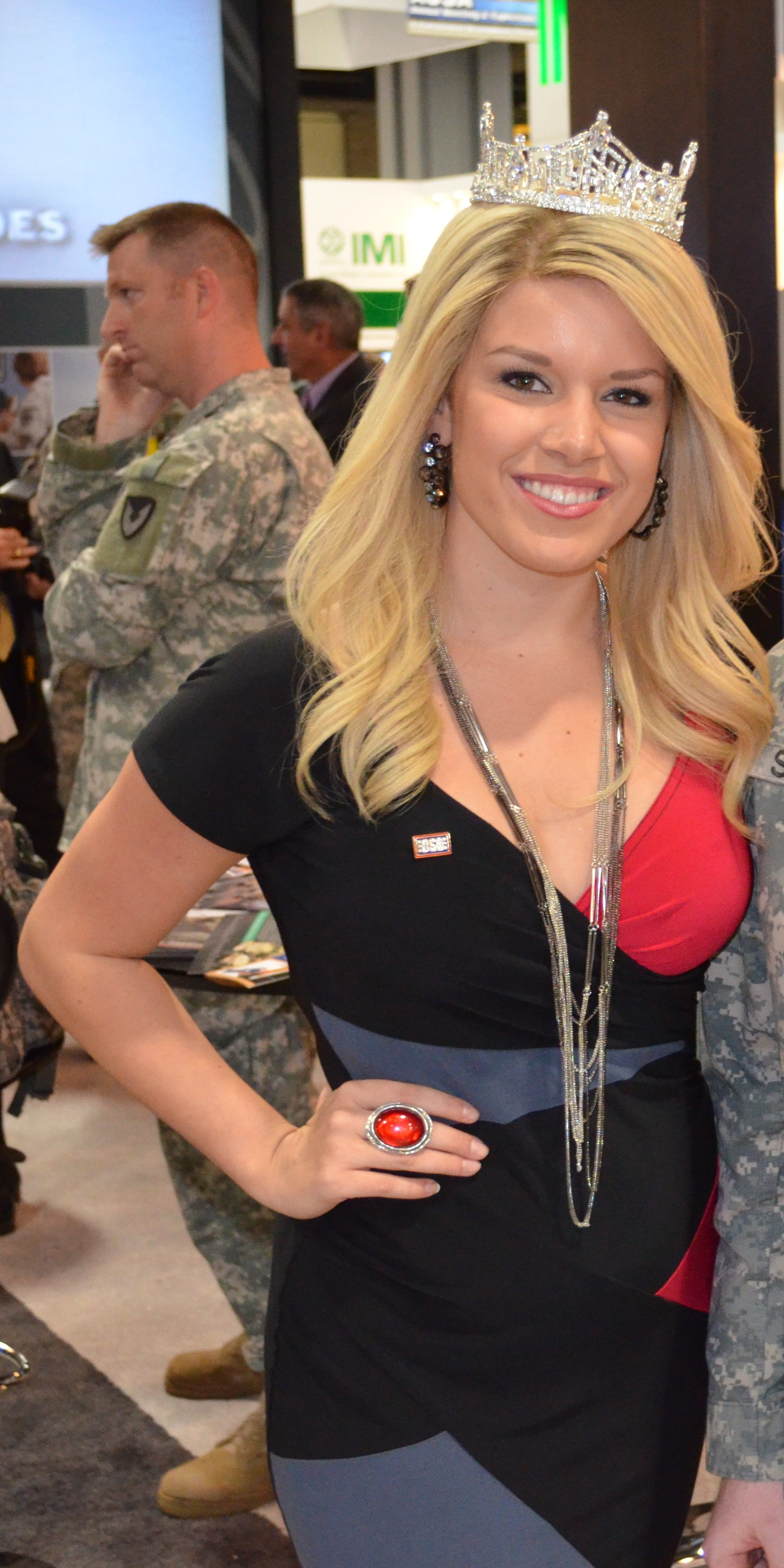
- Date: January 15, 2011
- Presenters: Chris Harrison, Brooke Burke
- Venue: Theatre for the Performing Arts, Paradise, Nevada
- Broadcaster: ABC
- Placements: 15
- Winner: Teresa Scanlan; Nebraska

Miss America 2011 was the 84th Miss America pageant. Since the first Miss America pageant was held 105 years ago, in 1921, the Miss America Organization was celebrating its 90th anniversary in 2011.

It was held at the Theatre for the Performing Arts of Planet Hollywood Resort and Casino on the Las Vegas Strip in Paradise, Nevada on Saturday, January 15, 2011. Miss America 2010, Caressa Cameron from Virginia, crowned her successor Teresa Scanlan from Nebraska at the end of this event. Scanlan became the first representative from Nebraska to win the Miss America title.

Delegates from the 50 states and the District of Columbia, Virgin Islands, and Puerto Rico competed for the title of Miss America 2011. The pageant was broadcast live on ABC. This was the first pageant telecast on ABC since Miss America 2005.

The judges were Joy Behar from ABC's The View, Miss America 1990 Debbye Turner Bell, television executive producer Mark Cherry, dancer Tony Dovolani from Dancing with the Stars, actress Marilu Henner, orthopedic surgeon and shoe designer Taryn Rose, and country singer Mark Wills.

== Results ==
=== Placements ===
| Placement | Contestant |
|---|---|
| Miss America 2011 | Nebraska – Teresa Scanlan |
| 1st Runner-Up | Arkansas – Alyse Eady |
| 2nd Runner-Up | Hawaii – Jalee Fuselier |
| 3rd Runner-Up | Washington – Jacquie Brown |
| 4th Runner-Up | Oklahoma – Emoly Ann West |
| Top 10 | Arizona – Kathryn Bulkley; California – Arianna Afsar; Delaware – Kayla Martell *; Kentucky – Djuan Trent **; Virginia – Caitlin Uze |
| Top 12 | New York – Claire Buffie *; Texas – Ashley Melnick |
| Top 15 | Oregon – Stephenie Steers **; Rhode Island – Deborah Saint-Vil; Utah – Christina Lowe |

* – America's Choice

** – Contestant's Choice

=== Awards ===
The Miss America 2011 scholarship award winners are:

==== Quality of Life award ====
| Results | Contestant | Platform |
|---|---|---|
| Winner | Michigan – Katie Lynn LaRoche | Raising Awareness of Human Trafficking |
| 1st runner-up | Delaware – Kayla Martell | – |
| 2nd runner-up | New Jersey – Ashleigh Udalovas | – |
| Finalists | Florida – Jaclyn Raulerson; (Georgia (U.S. state)) Georgia – Christina McCauley; Maryland – Lindsay Staniszewski; Minnesota – Kathryn Knuttila; Virginia – Caitlin Uze | Various |

== Delegates ==
The Miss America 2011 delegates were:

| State/district/terr. | Name | Hometown | Age^{1} | Talent | Platform | Placement | Awards | Notes |
|---|---|---|---|---|---|---|---|---|
| Alabama | Ashley Davis | Dothan | 22 | Vocal | Marching Toward a Brighter Future for Babies | | Preliminary Lifestyle & Fitness | |
| Alaska | Abby Hancock | Anchorage | 24 | Piano | Raising Global Citizens: The World is Our Classroom | | | |
| Arizona | Kathryn Bulkley | Mesa | 20 | Classical Vocal | Drowning Prevention Awareness | Top 10 | | Daughter of Miss Hawaii 1981 Pamela Offer |
| Arkansas | Alyse Eady | Fort Smith | 22 | Variety Act | Developing Leaders through The Boys and Girls Clubs of America | 1st runner-up | | Miss Arkansas' Outstanding Teen 2004 |
| California | Arianna Afsar | San Diego | 19 | Vocal | A Helping Hand for America's Seniors | Top 10 | | Previously Miss California's Outstanding Teen 2005; Preliminary Talent Award and 1st runner-up at Miss America's Outstanding Teen 2006; Youngest teen to date to have won a state title and was 1st runner-up to MAOT at 13; Starred as Eliza Hamilton in Hamilton Chicago; Top 36 on American Idol 8 |
| Colorado | Melaina Shipwash | Colorado Springs | 24 | Jazz Dance | Self Reflection: Eating Disorder Awareness and Education | | | |
| Connecticut | Brittany Decker | Bristol | 21 | Vocal | One World: Global Awareness for Global Prosperity | | | |
| Delaware | Kayla Martell | Milford | 21 | Contemporary Dance | National Alopecia Areata Foundation | Top 10 | Quality of Life 1st runner-up | America's Choice |
| (Washington, D.C.) District of Columbia | Stephanie Williams | Atlantic City, NJ | 23 | Broadway Vocal | A Dose of Prevention: Smart Medicine for What Ails America | | Fourpoints | |
| Florida | Jaclyn Raulerson | Plant City | 20 | Vocal | Stop Bullying Now! | | Quality of Life Finalist | |
| (Georgia (U.S. state)) Georgia | Christina McCauley | Marietta | 21 | Vocal | "Let's Get it Straight" – Scoliosis Awareness and Support | | Quality of Life Finalist | |
| Hawaii | Jalee Fuselier | Hale'iwa | 22 | Vocal | Ready for the "Real World" | 2nd runner-up | Preliminary Lifestyle & Fitness | Miss Hawaii's Outstanding Teen 2005 |
| Idaho | Kylie Kofoed | Eagle | 19 | Vocal | Strengthening the Family; Family Plus: The Boys and Girls Clubs of America | | | |
| Illinois | Whitney Thorpe-Klinsky | New Baden | 22 | Tap Dance | United: The Miss America Organization and Susan G. Komen for the Cure | | | |
| Indiana | Gabrielle Reed | Bloomington | 22 | Vocal | "Empowerment from the Start" Communities Preventing Domestic Violence | | Non-finalist Talent | |
| Iowa | Pauli Mayfield | Davenport | 24 | Vocal | Mentoring America's Kids: M.A.K.ing a Difference | | Ric Ferentz Non-finalist Interview | |
| Kansas | Lauren Werhan | Wichita | 20 | Ballet en Pointe | "Do the Deed" – Deeds of Service | | | |
| Kentucky | Djuan Trent | Columbus, GA | 24 | Vocal | Homelessness Awareness and Prevention: A Hand Up, Not a Hand Out | Top 10 | Contestants' Choice | |
| Louisiana | Kelsi Crain | Monroe | 20 | Ballet en Pointe | Heart for the Arts | | | 1st runner-up at Louisiana's Junior Miss 2008 |
| Maine | Arikka Knights | Chester | 24 | Tap Dance | Connecting the Generations | | | Contestant at National Sweetheart 2007 |
| Maryland | Lindsay Staniszewski | Edgewater | 22 | Vocal | Beyond Beauty: Building Self-Esteem and Positive Body Image in Girls | | Quality of Life Finalist | Sister of Kasey Staniszewski, Miss Maryland's Outstanding Teen 2007, Miss Maryland Teen USA 2009 and 3RD Runner up at Miss Teen USA 2009 and Later Miss Maryland USA 2013 and top 15 at Miss USA 2013. |
| Massachusetts | Loren Galler-Rabinowitz | Brookline | 24 | Piano | Fighting Childhood Hunger | | Miracle Maker | 2004 U.S. Ice Dancing Bronze Medalist |
| Michigan | Katie Lynn LaRoche | Bay City | 23 | Contemporary Dance | Raising Awareness of Human Trafficking | | Quality of Life, Miss Congeniality | Contestant at National Sweetheart 2009 |
| Minnesota | Kathryn Knuttila | Detroit Lakes | 24 | Piano | Inspiring America: Crowning the Good in Your Neighborhood | | Quality of Finalist, Non-finalist Talent, Louanne Gamba Instrumental | Sister of Miss Minnesota 2001 Kari Knuttila |
| Mississippi | Sarah Beth James | Madison | 21 | Piano | Donate Life – Promoting Organ and Tissue Donation | | Non-finalist Talent | |
| Missouri | Erika Hebron | O'Fallon | 24 | Lyrical Dance | Asthma Awareness Education | | | Missouri's Junior Miss 2005 |
| Montana | Kacie West | Kalispell | 21 | Musical Theater Vocal | Rising Above the Influence: Prevention of Underage Drinking | | | Miss Montana USA 2013 |
| Nebraska | Teresa Scanlan | Gering | 17 | Piano | Eating Disorders: A Generation at Risk | Winner | Preliminary Talent | Youngest Miss America winner since Bette Cooper in 1937; Later Miss Nebraska World 2015, 1st Runner-up at Miss World America 2015 |
| Nevada | Cris Crotz | Mesquite | 24 | Vocal | Promoting Cancer Prevention through Nutrition and Overall Wellness | | | Contestant on Whodunnit? |
| New Hampshire | Krystal Muccioli | Nashua | 20 | Vocal | Volunteerism: "Be the Change You Wish to See in the World" | | | |
| New Jersey | Ashleigh Udalovas | Millville | 22 | Tap Dance | Read to Succeed: Improving America's Future through Literacy | | Quality of Life 2nd runner-up | Contestant at National Sweetheart 2007 & 2008 |
| New Mexico | Madison Tabet | Albuquerque | 18 | Jazz Dance | Domestic Violence: The Solution Within | | | Miss New Mexico's Outstanding Teen 2007 |
| (New York (state)) New York | Claire Buffie | New York City | 24 | Contemporary Lyrical Dance | Straight for Equality: Let's Talk | Top 12 | America's Choice | Contestant at National Sweetheart 2008 as Miss Indiana, First contestant to campaign for the Miss America title on a gay rights platform |
| North Carolina | Adrienne Core | Erwin | 22 | Clogging | Supporting the V Foundation for Cancer Research | | Preliminary Talent, Non-finalist Talent | |
| North Dakota | Beth Dennison | Hutchinson, MN | 21 | Contemporary Dance | Leading by Example; A Child's Guide to Becoming a Volunteer | | | |
| Ohio | Becky Minger | Sylvania | 22 | Vocal | Discovering You, Empowering You: A Movement for Youth Development | | | |
| Oklahoma | Emoly West | Edmond | 25 | Ballet En Pointe | Leadership and Character Development | 4th runner-up | Preliminary Lifestyle & Fitness | |
| Oregon | Stephenie Steers | Hillsboro | 24 | Vocal | Human Trafficking Awareness | Top 15 | Contestants' Choice | |
| Pennsylvania | Courtney Thomas | Philadelphia | 22 | Fiddle | Don't C.O.P.P. Out! Consequences of Peer Pressure | | | Top 10 at National Sweetheart 2009 |
| Puerto Rico | Mariselle Morales | San Juan | 24 | Vocal | Brilliant Futures of America | | | |
| Rhode Island | Deborah Saint-Vil | Providence | 22 | Vocal | Mind Power: Ensuring Our Future | Top 15 | Preliminary Talent | |
| South Carolina | Desiree Puglia | Simpsonville | 22 | Tap Dance | Children's Miracle Network | | | |
| South Dakota | Loren Vaillancourt | Huron | 20 | Gymnastics Dance | Dangers of Distracted Driving | | | |
| Tennessee | Nicole Jordan | Memphis | 21 | Vocal | America's Promise Alliance: Grad Nation and Dropout Prevention | | | |
| Texas | Ashley Melnick | Fort Worth | 21 | Vocal | The Voice of Autism | Top 12 | | |
| Utah | Christina Lowe | Midway | 21 | Vocal | Spectacular Citizenship: It's Time to Give Back | Top 15 | | |
| Vermont | Caroline Bright | St. Albans | 20 | Vocal | Rock the World – Run for Office | | | Miss Vermont's Outstanding Teen 2007 |
| (United States Virgin Islands) Virgin Islands | Sheniqua Robinson | Saint Croix | 22 | Dance | Dance: A Movement Towards Better Health | | | |
| Virginia | Caitlin Uze | Arlington | 22 | Irish Dance | Uniquely You: Building Positive Self Image | Top 10 | Quality of Life Finalist, Marion A. Crooker | |
| (Washington (state)) Washington | Jacquie Brown | Vancouver | 21 | Vocal | Mentoring: Positive Influences That Can Change a Life | 3rd runner-up | | |
| West Virginia | Cali Young | Glen Dale | 24 | Dance | Inter-generational Programs: Keeping a Young Connection | | | |
| Wisconsin | Kimberley Sawyer | Egg Harbor | 23 | Operatic Vocal | Service for the Soul | | | |
| Wyoming | Alicia Grove | Rock Springs | 23 | Jazz Dance | Embrace Yourself: Women's Heart Health and Cardiovascular Disease Prevention | | | |

^{1} Age at the time of the Miss America pageant
