= Teresa Scanlan =

Miss America 2011 winner (born 1993)

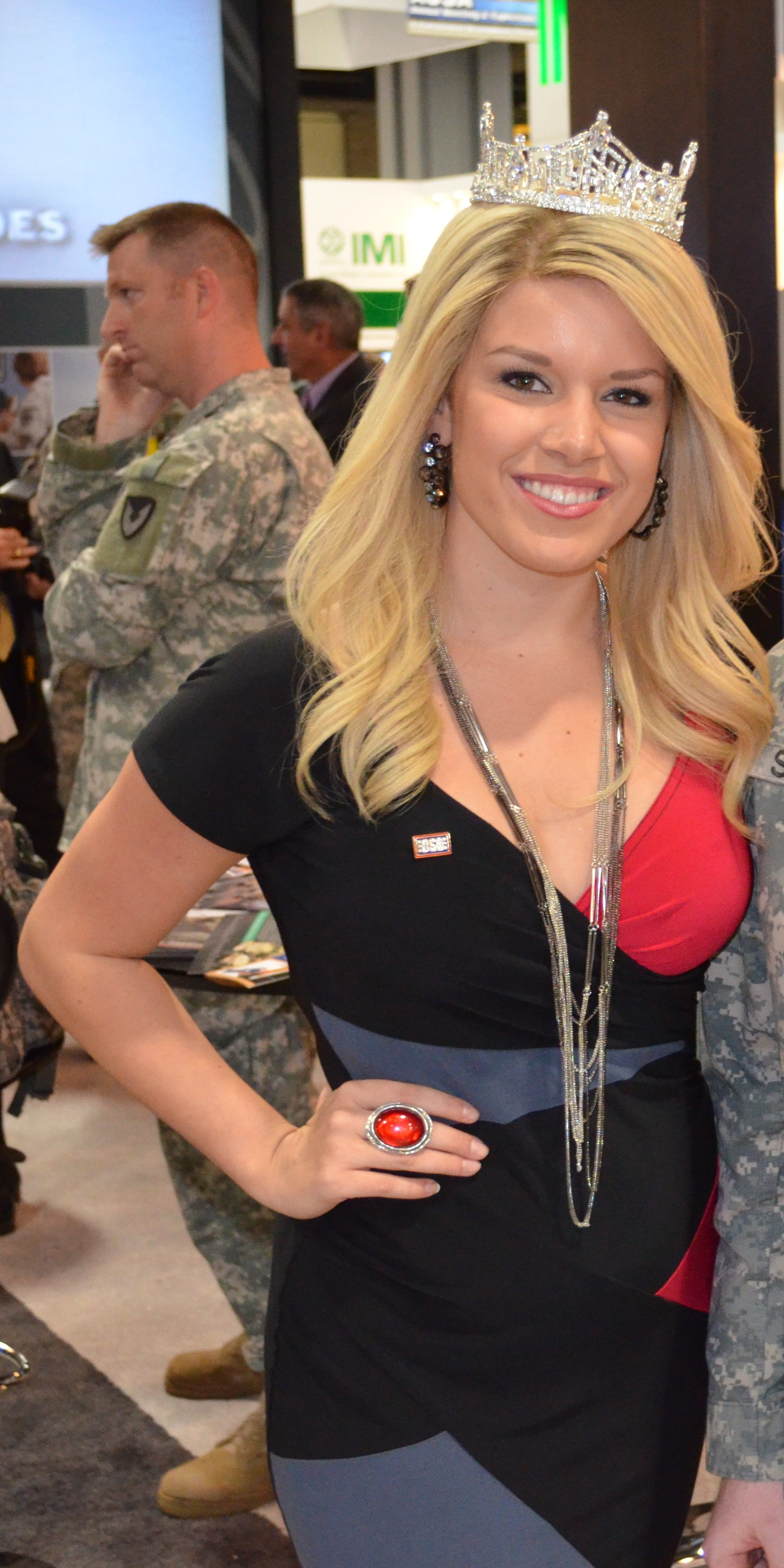
- Teresa Scanlan at Association of the United States Army convention in 2011
- Born: February 6, 1993 (age 33); Colton, California, U.S.
- Education: UC Berkeley School of Law
- Alma mater: Gering High School; Scottsbluff High School; Patrick Henry College
- Title: Miss Southeast 2010; Miss Nebraska 2010; Miss America 2011; Miss Nebraska World 2015
- Term: January 15, 2011 – January 14, 2012
- Predecessor: Caressa Cameron
- Successor: Laura Kaeppeler
- Spouse: John Mocadlo (m. 2015; div. 2016)
- Children: 1
- Website: teresascanlan.com

Teresa Michelle Scanlan (born February 6, 1993) is an American attorney and beauty pageant titleholder from Gering, Nebraska who was named Miss Nebraska 2010, subsequently winning Miss America 2011 at age 17 and becoming the youngest Miss America since Bette Cooper in 1937. She now works as a business litigation attorney at Paul Hastings in Houston, Texas, and serves as a staff sergeant in the Wyoming Air National Guard, in the Force Support Squadron.

== Biography ==
Scanlan is of Irish and Croatian ancestry. Her father is from Ireland (Scanlan is an Irish surname) and her maternal grandparents, Frank and Nives Jelich (Jelić), immigrated to the United States from Ilovik, Croatia.

Scanlan was home-schooled until her junior year of high school, before attending Gering High School part-time for half of her junior year. She graduated early from Scottsbluff High School in the spring of 2010 after taking a double load of classes throughout high school. Teresa was named a Salutatorian for the Scottsbluff class of 2010. While at Scottsbluff High School, she played the lead role Sharpay Evans in Disney's High School Musical Onstage. She also participated in choir, show choir, and speech. In 2012, she enrolled as a student at Patrick Henry College.

In her spare time, Scanlan enjoys singing, acting, dancing, playing piano and guitar, composing songs, baking, participating in activities with her local church, and making clothes out of duct tape, among many other hobbies.

In 2018, Scanlan announced she had joined the Air National Guard as an Airman First Class, while continuing her education at UC Berkeley School of Law. She serves as a member of the Wyoming Air National Guard in the 153rd Force Support Squadron. Scanlan graduated from her basic combat training class in the top 10%.

In 2021, Scanlan graduated from UC Berkeley School of Law and joined King & Spalding as a business litigation attorney in their Houston, Texas office. Then in 2025, Scanlan joined Paul Hasting's Houston, Texas office as an associate in the Complex Litigation and Arbitration practice.

== Pageants ==
Miss Nebraska 2010

She won the title of Miss Nebraska 2010 on June 5, 2010, when she received her crown from outgoing titleholder Brittany Jeffers. Scanlan's platform is “Eating Disorders: A Generation at Risk.” Scanlan's passion to combat eating disorders stems from a friend who struggled with bulimia. Scanlan did research about eating disorders for her friend and discovered how rampant it was across the nation. She hopes to educate children and adults alike as to the signs and risks of eating disorders, as well as how and where to get help for themselves or a loved one. Her competition talent was piano. At 17 years of age, she is the youngest Miss Nebraska ever crowned. After winning the title of Miss Nebraska 2010, Scanlan announced that she was taking a year off from school to fulfill her duties as Miss Nebraska 2010, and that she had deferred enrollment to Patrick Henry College until the fall of 2011.

Miss America 2011

Scanlan was Nebraska's representative at the Miss America 2011 competition held in Las Vegas, Nevada in January 2011. Her platform for the national pageant was "Eating Disorders: A Generation at Risk."

In the preliminary competition, Scanlan won the talent portion and a $2,000 scholarship for her piano performance of "White Water Chop Sticks."

Scanlan beat out first runner-up Miss Arkansas 2010, Alyse Eady, for the title of Miss America 2011 and was crowned by Miss America 2010 Caressa Cameron on January 15, 2011. With this win she became the first Miss Nebraska ever to claim the Miss America title, as well as the youngest winner in 74 years. Along with the title of Miss America, she also won a $50,000 scholarship. Furthermore, Scanlan was the first titleholder from Nebraska to win Miss America, Miss USA, or Miss Teen USA.

Miss World America 2015

Scanlan was later crowned Miss Nebraska World 2015, and competed at the Miss World America 2015 pageant, where she finished as first runner-up to Arizona's Victoria Mendoza.

== Personal life ==
On September 6, 2015, Scanlan married Connecticut automobile dealer John Mocadlo, after being engaged for eight months. Mocadlo and Scanlan served ex officio for the Miss Connecticut Scholarship Organization within the Miss America program. In 2016, Scanlan and her husband had a son, and divorced later that same year.

Awards and achievements
Preceded by Caressa Cameron	Miss America; 2011	Succeeded by Laura Kaeppeler
Preceded by Brittany Jeffers	Miss Nebraska; 2010	Succeeded by Nicky Haverland
