= Alyse Eady =

American model and TV news anchor

Alyse Eady Lemmond
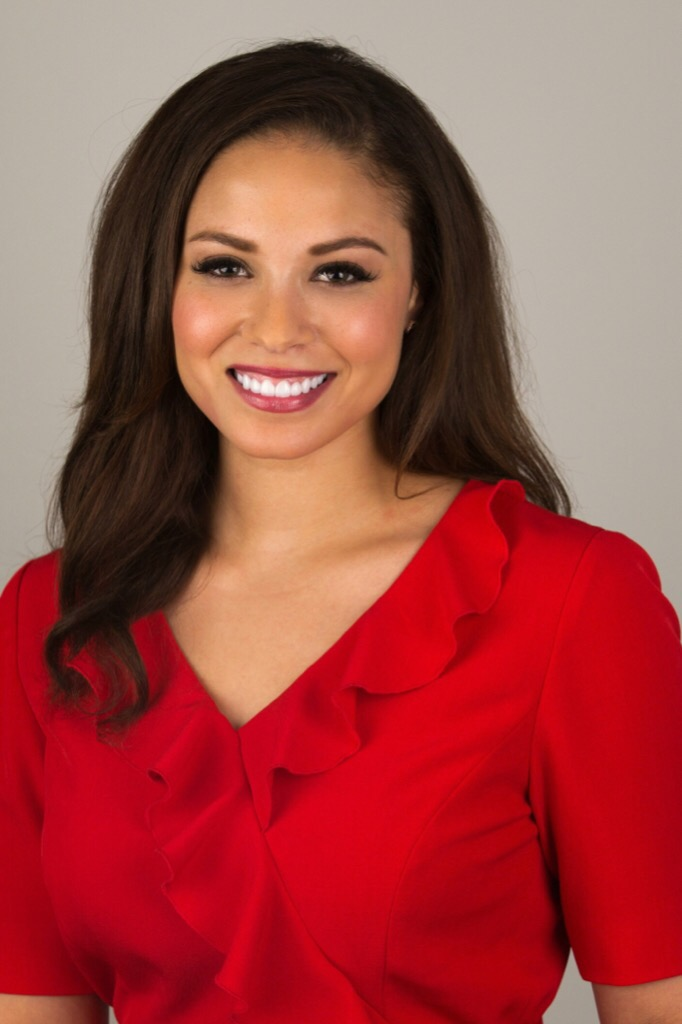
- Born: Alyse Cynthia Eady; March 15, 1988 (age 38); Fort Smith, Arkansas, U.S.
- Education: Ouachita Baptist University; Universidad de Alicante
- Spouse: Patrick Jeffrey Lemmond (m. 2013)
- Beauty pageant titleholder
- Title: Miss Teen Arkansas-America 2004; Miss South Central Arkansas 2010; Miss Arkansas 2010
- Hair color: Brunette
- Eye color: Hazel
- Major competition: Miss America 2011 (first runner-up)

Alyse Cynthia Eady (born March 15, 1988) is an American news anchor and beauty pageant titleholder who was Miss Arkansas 2010. Eady was named first runner-up at the Miss America 2011 pageant, which was won by Miss Nebraska 2010 Teresa Scanlan.

== Biography ==
Eady is from Fort Smith, Arkansas, and was a caretaker for both of her parents, who were ill when she was growing up. Eady's father became blind and her mother had lupus and had multiple surgeries when Eady was younger. Eady helped out by learning to cook, and assisting her mother to bathe and dress. During high school, she worked as a tutor for the local Boys and Girls Club.

Eady graduated from Ouachita Baptist University with a Bachelor of Arts in Mass Communications and Speech Communication.

In 2004, she won the title of Miss Teen Arkansas-America 2004, which is now known as Miss Arkansas' Outstanding Teen. She performed in the Variety Act as a special guest during one of the Preliminary Competitions at Miss America 2007 including her yodeling abilities. In 2010, she was named Miss Arkansas 2010 while competing as Miss South Central Arkansas 2010 and also won a Preliminary Talent Award and the Coleman Overall Talent Award at the pageant. Her platform was the Boys & Girls Clubs of America and her talent is a Variety Act, in which she both sings and does ventriloquism to the song "I Want to Be a Cowboy's Sweetheart." Her act, which also included yodeling, was called "daring and skillful" by The Washington Post.

At the Miss America 2011 pageant, Eady was named the first runner-up and won $25,000 in scholarships. In 2011, she also appeared on the Late Night Show With David Letterman.

Eady married her college sweetheart, Patrick Jeffrey Lemmond, on December 7, 2013.

Eady previously worked as a news anchor for TEGNA-owned KTHV-TV, the local CBS-affiliated television station in Little Rock, Arkansas. In August 2016, Eady joined WAGA-TV in Atlanta, GA as a morning news anchor.

Awards and achievements
Preceded by Sarah Slocum	Miss Arkansas; 2010	Succeeded by Kristen Glover
Preceded by Lindsey Wright	Miss Teen Arkansas-America; 2004	Succeeded by Hannah Joiner
