= Miss America 2012 =

85th edition of the Miss America competition

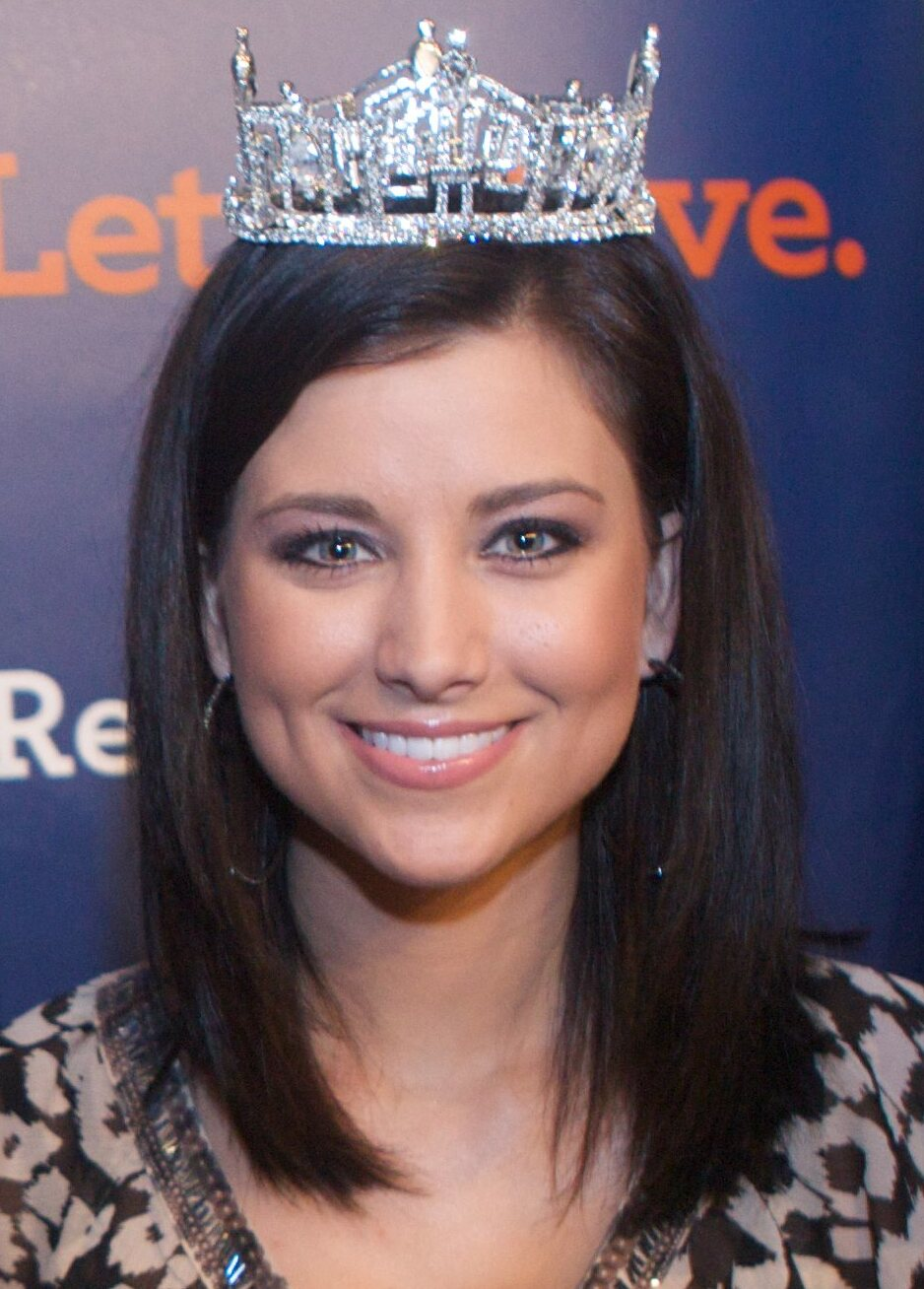
- Laura Kaeppeler, Miss America 2012
- Date: January 14, 2012
- Presenters: Chris Harrison; Brooke Burke
- Venue: Theatre for the Performing Arts, Las Vegas, Nevada
- Broadcaster: ABC
- Entrants: 53
- Placements: 15
- Winner: Laura Kaeppeler; Wisconsin

Miss America 2012 was the 85th Miss America pageant, held at the Theatre for the Performing Arts of Planet Hollywood Resort and Casino in Las Vegas, Nevada, on January 14, 2012.

Teresa Scanlan of Nebraska crowned Laura Kaeppeler of Wisconsin as her successor at the end of this event.

== Results ==
=== Placements ===
Placement	Contestant
Miss America 2012	Wisconsin – Laura Kaeppeler
1st Runner-Up	Oklahoma – Betty Thompson*
2nd Runner-Up	New York – Kaitlin Monte
3rd Runner-Up	Arizona – Jennifer Sedler
4th Runner-Up	California – Noelle Freeman
Top 10	Illinois – Hannah Smith; Iowa – Jessica Pray; Louisiana – Hope Anderson; Tennessee – Erin Hatley; Texas – Kendall Morris
Top 13	Alabama – Courtney Porter**; Florida – Kristina Janolo; South Carolina – Bree Boyce
Top 15	North Carolina – Hailey Best; Virginia – Elizabeth Crot

* - America's Choice

** - Saved by eliminated delegates after Swimsuit Competition to compete in Evening Gown as a "wild card"

=== Awards ===
==== Preliminary awards ====
Awards	Contestant
Lifestyle and Fitness	(New York (state)) New York - Kaitlin Monte; Texas - Kendall Morris; Utah - Danica Olsen
Talent	Hawaii - Lauren Cheape; Oklahoma - Betty Thompson; Wisconsin - Laura Kaeppeler

==== Quality of Life award ====
Results	Contestant	Platform
Winner	Kentucky - Ann-Blair Thornton	Alzheimer's Awareness Research
1st runner-up	New Hampshire - Regan Hartley	-
2nd runner-up	Michigan - Elizabeth Wertenberger	-
Finalists	Arkansas - Kristen Glover; Hawaii - Lauren Cheape; Minnesota - Natalie Davis; (New York (state)) New York - Kaitlin Monte; Ohio - Ellen Bryan	Various

==== Other awards ====
Awards	Contestant
Miss Congeniality	Nebraska - Kayla Batt
Children's Miracle Network (CMN) Miracle Maker Award	Louisiana - Hope Anderson
Four Points Award	Idaho - Genevieve Nutting
Non-finalist Talent Award	Delaware - Maria Cahill; Hawaii - Lauren Cheape; Nebraska - Kayla Batt; (Washington (state)) Washington - Brittney Henry
Ric Ferentz Non-finalist Interview Award	(Washington, D.C.) District of Columbia - Ashley Boalch

== Judges ==
The seven judges for the competition were:

- dancer and musician Mark Ballas
- television personality Raúl De Molina
- television producer Mike Fleiss
- television personality Kris Jenner
- actress Teri Polo
- personal trainer Chris Powell
- television personality Lara Spencer

== Contestants ==
The following contestants competed for the title.

State/district/terr.	Name
Alabama	Courtney Porter
Alaska	Katy Lovegreen
Arizona	Jennifer Sedler
Arkansas	Kristen Glover
California	Noelle Freeman
Colorado	Diana Tremaine
Connecticut	Morgan Amarone
Delaware	Maria Cahill
(Washington, D.C.) District of Columbia	Ashley Boalch
Florida	Kristina Janolo
(Georgia (U.S. state)) Georgia	Michaela Lackey
Hawaii	Lauren Cheape
Idaho	Genevieve Nutting
Illinois	Hannah Smith
Indiana	Jackie Jerlecki
Iowa	Jessica Pray
Kansas	Carissa Kelley
Kentucky	Ann-Blair Thornton
Louisiana	Hope Anderson
Maine	Julia Furtado
Maryland	Carlie Colella
Massachusetts	Molly Whalen
Michigan	Elizabeth Wertenberger
Minnesota	Natalie Davis
Mississippi	Mary Margaret Roark
Missouri	Sydney Friar
Montana	Veronika Ohlinger
Nebraska	Kayla Batt
Nevada	Alana Lee
New Hampshire	Regan Hartley
New Jersey	Katharyn Nicolle
New Mexico	Sarina Turnbull
(New York (state)) New York	Kaitlin Monte
North Carolina	Hailey Best
North Dakota	Ariana Walker
Ohio	Ellen Bryan
Oklahoma	Betty Thompson
Oregon	Caroline McGowan
Pennsylvania	Juliann Sheldon
Puerto Rico	Laura Ramirez
Rhode Island	Robin Bonner
South Carolina	Bree Boyce
South Dakota	Anna Simpson
Tennessee	Erin Hatley
Texas	Kendall Morris
Utah	Danica Olsen
Vermont	Katie Levasseur
(United States Virgin Islands) Virgin Islands	Camila Daniels
Virginia	Elizabeth Crot
(Washington (state)) Washington	Brittney Henry
West Virginia	Spenser Wempe
Wisconsin	Laura Kaeppeler
Wyoming	Catherine Brown

== Replacements ==
- Montana - Veronika Ohlinger was originally the 1st runner-up but later was crowned Miss Montana 2011 to replace the original winner Taryn Chuter, who resigned due to a knee injury that required surgery.
