= Brittany Lee Lewis =

US activist, educator, political commentator and beauty pageant contestant

- Born: July 21, 1990 (age 35)
- Education: George Washington University; Temple University
- Occupation: Television personality
- Known for: Miss Black America 2017; Miss Delaware 2014
- Website: https://www.brittanyleelewis.com/

Brittany Lee Lewis (born July 21, 1990) is an activist, television personality, political commentator, disc jockey (DJ), Miss Delaware 2014, and Miss Black America 2017. She is a native of Brigantine, New Jersey. Lewis was crowned the 49th Miss Black America in 2017 and she competed in the Miss America Pageant as Miss Delaware in 2014. She is also a regular commentator on RT News, Roland Martin Show, Fox5DC, and various Sinclair Broadcasting programs.

Lewis is an advocate for domestic violence awareness and chooses it as her platform topic in pageants; her sister was fatally shot in 2010 after an abusive relationship of five years. Lewis is a historian and educator, having taught at both the college and post-secondary levels. She has a B.A., M.A., and is a PhD candidate in the history department at George Washington University.

Her activism and pageantry have been covered by NPR, The Washington Post, Southern Living, and Good Morning Washington, among others.

== Pageantry ==
Lewis began entering pageants at the age of 21 when she a senior in college to help pay off student loans.

In 2012, Lewis was awarded Miss Greater Reading Pennsylvania 2012, and was third place in the Miss Pennsylvania Scholarship Pageant performing ballet en pointe to "Don Quixote: Kitri Variation". She followed that up in 2013, when she was crowned Miss Hockessin. She later emceed the pageant in 2014.

On September 14, 2014, she competed as Miss Delaware in the Miss America 2015 Pageant, earning first runner-up for the Quality of Life Award. She later donated a shoe she wore in the pageant to the Atlantic City History Museum. Nearly three years later, Lewis was crowned Miss Black America 2017 on August 26, 2017. During the pageant she danced to "Stomp to my Beat" by JS16. Lewis later said she competed as "part of her research" for her PhD dissertation.

== Domestic violence advocacy ==
Lewis actively advocates for awareness of domestic violence. Her sister, Gina Clarke-Lewis, was killed in March 2010 as a result of domestic violence. Lewis has worked with state and national nonprofits and "led the charge to declare October as Domestic Violence Awareness Month." She also has worked with the Delaware Coalition Against Domestic Violence and the Department of Justice's Violence Unit speaking on college campuses and secondary schools about the issue.

== Education ==
After graduating from Holy Spirit High School in 2008, Lewis earned a BA from Temple University where she double majored in African-American Studies and Broadcast Journalism. At Temple University, she also danced competitively on the Diamond Gem Dance Team, formed the Black New Voice Newsletter, and joined the Alpha Kappa Alpha sorority.

In 2013, she earned her MA Degree in Secondary Education, as part of the Teach for America program.

In 2015, Lewis entered the PhD program at George Washington University, specializing in African- American, urban, women's, and US 20th century history with an emphasis on political ideology, social movements, and the state.

Lewis also works as an adjunct professor at Wilmington University, teaching the course "Ethnic Studies: The Black Woman.”

== Television ==
Lewis has worked as a television personality and political commentator for multiple networks.

She regularly appears on Fox5DC, RT News, the Roland Martin Show, and several Sinclair Broadcasting programs.
