= Miss Virgin Islands =

Miss America pageant

The Miss Virgin Islands competition is the pageant that selects the representative for the territory of United States Virgin Islands in the Miss America pageant. The competition did not renew its license in 2015 and did not send a contestant to the Miss America 2016 pageant. There has been no representatives since.

== Winners ==
Year	Name	Hometown	Age	Local Title	Miss America Talent	Placement at Miss America	Special scholarships at Miss America	Notes
2025	Has not sent representatives since 2015.							
2024	Has not sent representatives since 2015.							
2023	Has not sent representatives since 2015.							
2022	Has not sent representatives since 2015.							
2021	Has not sent representatives since 2015.							
2019-2020	Has not sent representatives since 2015.							
2018	Has not sent representatives since 2015.							
2017	Has not sent representatives since 2015.							
2016	Has not sent representatives since 2015.							
2015	Alexandra Pierre	Prior Lake, Minnesota	21			Did not compete		
2014	Ashley Gabriel	Orlando, Florida	19		Vocal "Rolling in the Deep" by Adele			
2013	Ashley Massiah	Fredricksted	21		Majorette Dance "Requiem"			
2012	Aniska Tonge	Saint Thomas	21		Vocal "Let Me Be Your Star"			Miss World US Virgin Islands 2014 and represented the US Virgin Islands at Miss World 2014 Also Miss Universe US Virgin Islands 2018 and represented the US Virgin Islands at Miss Universe 2018
2011	Camila Daniels	Saint Thomas	18		Flute "Birds" from The Carnival of the Animals			
2010	Sheniqua Robinson	Saint Croix	22		Lyrical Dance "Hallelujah"			
2009	Shayla Solomon	Saint Thomas	23		Dramatic Monologue from A Midsummer Night's Dream			
2008	Shamika Thomas	Saint Thomas	23		Vocal			
2007	Janeisha John	Saint Thomas	20		Jazz Dance "Astonishing" from Little Women			Miss US Virgin Islands 2010 and represented the US Virgin Islands at Miss Universe 2010
2006	Stacy Smith	Saint Thomas	24		Steel Pan & Vocal "Overjoyed"			
2005	Allison Bourne-Vanneck	Saint Thomas	22		Steel Pans "Eine kleine Nachtmusik" & "Hot Hot Hot"			
2004	Kinila Callendar	Saint Thomas	24		Cultural Dance "Jam Band Party Mix"			
