= Miss Delaware =

Beauty pageant competition

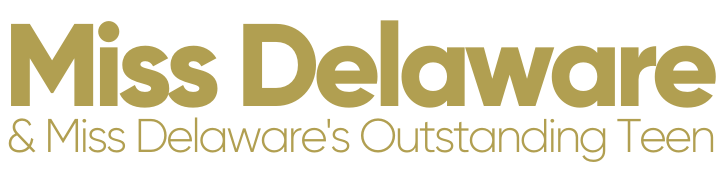
- Formation: 1933; 93 years ago
- Type: Beauty pageant
- Headquarters: Dover
- Location: Delaware
- Members: Miss America
- Official language: English
- Executive Director: Joanna Wicks Talmo
- President: Beth Ann Jones
- Website: Official website

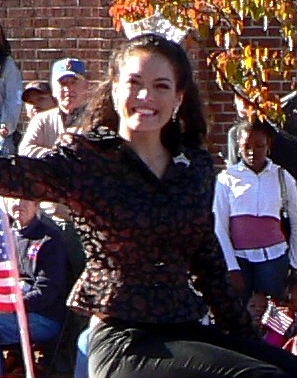
Jamie Ginn, Miss Delaware 2006

The Miss Delaware competition is the pageant that selects the representative of Delaware in the Miss America pageant. The event takes place annually in the month of June and has previously been held in Rehoboth Beach at Convention Hall, in the state capital of Dover, Delaware at the Dover Downs Hotel and Casino, and in Milton at the Milton Theatre. Miss Delaware serves as the official hostess to the state of Delaware.

Anaya Harrison of Wilmington was crowned Miss Delaware on June 20, 2026, at the Thompson Theatre at the University of Delaware in Newark. She competed for the title of Miss America 2027 on September 6, 2026, at the Kravis Center for the Performing Arts in West Palm Beach, Florida.

== Results summary ==
The following is a visual summary of the past results of Miss Delaware titleholders at the national Miss America pageants/competitions. The year in parentheses indicates the year of the national competition during which a placement and/or award was garnered, not the year attached to the contestant's state title.

=== Placements ===
- Top 10: Lois Anne Alava (1954), Catherine Lawton (1973), Debora Rica Lipford (1977), Kayla Martell (2011)
- Top 15: Peggy Insolo (1940), Galen Giaccone (2009)

=== Awards ===
==== Preliminary awards ====
- Preliminary Lifestyle and Fitness: Janice Anne Albro (1979)
- Preliminary Talent: Lois Anne Alava (1954), Catherine Lawton (1973), Junnie Cross (2001), Galen Giaccone (2009)

==== Non-finalist awards ====
- Non-finalist Talent: Robin Jane Whemper (1962), Elaine Campanelli (1976), Sandra Louise Aiken (1978), Lisa Marie Munzert (1991), Jennifer Lin Kaczmarczyk (1994), Alison White (1998), Rebecca Bledsoe (2006), Maria Cahill (2012), Rebecca Jackson (2014), Brooke Mitchell (2016)
- Non-finalist Interview: Alyssa Murray (2013)

==== Other awards ====
- Miss Congeniality: Paula Kusmer (1972)
- Equity and Justice Finalist: Sophie Phillips (2022)
- George Cavalier Talent Award: Anne Marie Jarka (1988)
- Bernie Wayne Scholarship for the Performing Arts: Junnie Cross (2001)
- Bert Parks Talent Award: Michelle Harris (1996), Junnie Cross (2001)
- Quality of Life Award 1st runners-up: Kayla Martell (2011), Brittany Lewis (2015)
- Quality of Life Award Finalists: Junnie Cross (2001), Linda Kurtz (2005), Alyssa Murray (2012)
- Forever Miss Americas Scholarship: Grace Otley (2023)

== Winners ==
- Declared as winner
- Ended as a runner-up
- Ended as a finalist or semi-finalist

Year	Name	Hometown	Age	Local Title	Miss America Talent	Placement at Miss America	Special scholarships at Miss America	Notes
2026	Anaya Harrison	Wilmington	24	Miss Claymont	Piano			
2025	Hailey Mack	Ocean View	18	Miss Ocean View	Color Guard, “Uccen”			2nd woman to perform color guard as a talent at Miss America
2024	Nova Gaffney	Milford	24	Miss Southern Delaware	Classical Ballet en Pointe, "Carmen"			
2023	Emily Beale	Ocean View	27	Miss Ocean View	Tap Dance, “The Devil Went Down to Georgia”			
2022	Grace Otley	Hockessin	22	Miss Dover	Violin, "Smooth Criminal"		Forever Miss Americas Scholarship	Previously Miss Delaware's Outstanding Teen 2014
2021	Sophie Phillips	Bear	25	Miss Milford	Piano, "Good Golly, Miss Molly"		Equity and Justice Finalist	
2019–2020	Hillary May	Mount Vernon, IN	23	Miss Hockessin	Vocal, "I Could Have Danced All Night"			2020 competition was postponed indefinitely due to COVID-19 pandemic
2018	Joanna Wicks	Wilmington	24	Miss Wilmington	Speed Painting, "Confident"			
2017	Chelsea Bruce	Manasquan, NJ	21	Miss Newark	Contemporary Dance, "Sleeping at Last" by Turning Page			Eligible as a student at the University of Delaware
2016	Amanda Debus	Middletown	23	Miss First State	Contemporary Ballet, "Fight Song"			Previously Miss Delaware's Outstanding Teen 2008 Previously Miss Delaware Teen USA 2011 3rd runner-up at Miss Delaware USA 2018 pageant 1st runner-up at Miss Delaware USA 2019 pageant
2015	Brooke Mitchell	Selbyville	19	Miss Milford	Tap Dance/Baton Twirling, "Uptown Funk"		Non-finalist Talent Award	Contestant at National Sweetheart 2014 pageant
2014	Brittany Lewis	Brigantine, NJ	23	Miss Wilmington	Jazz Dance		Quality of Life Award 1st runner-up	Originally first runner-up, assumed title when Longacre was dethroned
2014	Amanda Longacre	Bear	24	Miss Pike Creek	Vocal	Unable to compete; dethroned due to her not meeting the Miss America Organization's age requirement		
2013	Rebecca Jackson	Kennett Square, PA	21	Miss Dover	Vocal, "Think of Me" from The Phantom of the Opera		Non-finalist Talent Award	
2012	Alyssa Murray	Selbyville	20	Miss Coastal Bay	Jazz Dance, "River Deep – Mountain High"		Non-finalist Interview Award Quality of Life Award Finalist	4th runner-up at Miss Delaware USA 2015 competition 1st runner-up at Miss Delaware USA 2018 competition
2011	Maria Cahill	Newark	20	Miss Rehoboth Beach	Irish Dance, "Lord of the Dance"		Non-finalist Talent Award	
2010	Kayla Martell	Milford	21	Miss Kent County	Contemporary Ballet en Pointe, "The Way You Make Me Feel"	Top 10	Quality of Life Award 1st runner-up	Voted into the Top 15 as a "People's Choice" by public voting First contestant with alopecia areata to compete in Miss America pageant
2009	Heather Lehman	Magnolia	20	Miss Diamond State	Classical Vocal, "Adele's Laughing Song" from Die Fledermaus			
2008	Galen Giaccone	Wyoming	20	Miss Diamond State	Piano, "El Cumbanchero" by Rafael Hernández Marín	Top 15	Preliminary Talent Award	
2007	Brittany Dempsey	Dover	20	Miss Capital	Jazz Dance, "Rhythm of the Night"			Previously Delaware's Junior Miss 2005
2006	Jamie Ginn	Wilmington	25	Miss Brandywine	Dance, "Dancin' Fool" from Copacabana			4th runner-up at National Sweetheart 2005 pageant as Miss New Jersey
2005	Rebecca Bledsoe	Middletown	22	Miss Central Delaware	Classical Vocal, "Una Voce Poco Fa" from The Barber of Seville		Non-finalist Talent Award	
2004	Linda Kurtz	Dover	21	Miss Dover	Ballet, "Man of La Mancha"		Quality of Life Award Finalist	Contestant at National Sweetheart 2003 pageant
2003	Erin Elizabeth Williams	Lincoln	20	Miss Eastern Shore	Classical Vocal, "Time to Say Goodbye"			
2002	Shoha Parekh	Newark	24	Miss Greenville	Bharatnatyam Style Dance			
2001	Erin Cooper	Camden	22	Miss Hockessin	Lyrical Ballet, "Book of Days"			
2000	Junnie Cross	Dover	22	Miss Hockessin	Vocal, "Wishing You Were Somehow Here Again" from The Phantom of the Opera		Bert Parks Talent Award Bernie Wayne Scholarship for the Performing Arts Award Preliminary Talent Award Quality of Life Award Finalist	
1999	Kama Boland	Hockessin	22	Miss Diamond State	Piano, "Jerry Lee Lewis Medley"			
1998	Jody Kelly	Dover	22	Miss Hockessin	Flute, "Shenandoah" and "Dueling Banjos"			
1997	Alison White	Millsboro	18	Miss Millsboro	Classical Vocal, "Poor Wand'ring One" from The Pirates of Penzance		Non-finalist Talent Award	
1996	Aimee Michelle Voshell	Felton	18	Miss Dover	Ballet en Pointe "Return to Innocence"			Mother to Miss Delaware's Outstanding Teen 2022, Brynn String
1995	Michelle Harris	Newark	24	Miss Brandywine	Vocal, "I Will Always Love You"		Bert Parks Talent Award	
1994	Letitia Lee Pusey	Millsboro	23	Miss Sussex County	Lyrical Tap Dance			
1993	Jennifer Lin Kaczmarczyk	Hockessin	20	Miss Brandywine	Popular Vocal, "This Is the Moment"		Non-finalist Talent Award	
1992	Kathleen Ann Slavin	Dagsboro	25	Miss Sussex County	Vocal, "My Man"			
1991	Beth Ann Jones	Wilmington	22	Miss Brandywine	Vocal Medley			
1990	Lisa Marie Munzert	New Castle	20	Miss Brandywine	Dance / Twirling, "They're Playing Our Song"		Non-finalist Talent Award	
1989	Robin Lee Coutant	Millsboro	21	Miss University	Vocal, "Think of Me"			
1988	Laura Kathleen Ludwig	Lewes	21	Miss Sussex County	Popular Vocal, "Happy Days Are Here Again"			
1987	Anne Marie Jarka	Newark	21	Miss University	Vocal / Piano, "Almost Over You"		George Cavalier Talent Award	
1986	Lori Ann Scott	Wilmington	23	Miss Wilmington	Popular Vocal, "Love Is Spreading All Over"			
1985	Lisa Anne Patrick	Newark	24	Miss Newark	Character Ballet en Pointe			
1984	Nancy Lynn Ball	Rehoboth Beach	24	Miss Cape Henlopen	Jazz Ballet en Pointe			
1983	Tammy Renee Copeland	Newark	21	Miss Greater Wilmington	Vocal, "Cry Me a River"			
1982	Nancy Ellen Farley	Elsmere	21	Miss New Castle	Comedy Monologue, "Report of the Nominating Committee"			
1981	Jodi Meade Graham	Wilmington	19	Miss Brandywine College	Vocal, "Can You Read My Mind"			Daughter of Miss Pennsylvania 1956, Lorna Ringler Graham, and grand-niece of Miss America 1924, Ruth Malcomson
1980	Andra Lee Dickerson	Newark	21	Miss Newark	Piano / Vocal			
1979	Ann Lorraine Harrington	Milford	22	Miss Milford	Magic Act			
1978	Janice Anne Albro	Claymont	25	Miss Brandywine Hundred	Piano Medley, "The Entertainer" & "Maple Leaf Rag"		Preliminary Swimsuit Award	
1977	Sandra Louise Aiken	Seaford	21	Miss Seaford	Classical Vocal, "Quando me'n vo'"		Non-finalist Talent Award	
1976	Debora Rica Lipford	Newark	21	Miss Newark	Dramatic Interpretation, "It Was a Good Time" from Ryan's Daughter	Top 10		First African-American contestant to reach the top 10 at Miss America pageant
1975	Elaine Campanelli	Ocean View	20	Miss Ocean View	Fire Baton Routine		Non-finalist Talent Award	
1974	Kathleen Attanasi	Rehoboth Beach	22	Miss Rehoboth Beach	Harp Medley, "Harmonious Blacksmith" & "Close To You"			
1973	Jackie LaGuardia	Milford	19	Miss Sussex West	Vocal from Irma La Douce			
1972	Catherine Lawton	Clayton	20	Miss University Motors	Banjo, "Banjo Memories"	Top 10	Preliminary Talent Award	
1971	Paula Kusmer	Wilmington	19	Miss Goldey-Beacom College	Dramatic reading from The Diary of Anne Frank		Miss Congeniality	
1970	Linda Sue Hitchens	Seaford	20	Miss Nylon Capital	Vocal / Dance, "Give My Regards to Broadway"			
1969	Margo Ewing	Wilmington	19	Miss Talleyville	Vocal, "My Mother's Wedding Day"			Served as a Delaware state senator
1968	Gayle Freeman	Wilmington	19	Miss Brandywine College	Vocal & Guitar, "Times They Are a-Changin'"			
1967	Susan Alice Levens	Dover	18	Miss Wesley College	Vocal, "Who Will Buy" from Oliver!			
1966	Mary Lee Mancini	Wilmington	19	Miss Greater Wilmington	Ballet / Sketch			
1965	Kathleen Grandell	Wilmington	18	Miss Brandywine	Multi-lingual Monologue			
1964	Anita Gail Eubank	Wilmington	20	Miss Brandywine	Popular Vocal & Dance			
1963	Diane Beverly Isaacs	Greenwood		Miss Greenwood	Piano & Popular Vocal			Previously married to current United States Senator, Tom Carper
1962	Alice Richards Watts	Lewes	19	Miss Harrington	Pantomime, "Seventeen"			
1961	Robin Jane Whempner	Wilmington	18	Miss Newark	Vocal & Dance, "That's What Makes Paris Paree" from April in Paris		Non-finalist Talent Award	
1960	Deborah Dunkenfield Benoit	Wilmington	21		Composite Expression of Special Training			
1959	Ester Olney	Newark	18		Vocal			
1958	Nancy M. Williams	Wilmington			Dance to musical selections from Gone With the Wind			
1957	Kathleen Ann D'Attilio	Wilmington	19		Piano			
1956	Janice Olson	Newark						
1955	Joanne Lorraine Sakowski	Wilmington	19		Vocal			
1954	Barbara Jane Woodall	Claymont	20		Piano			
1953	Lois Anne Alava	Wilmington			Piano, "Concerto in A Minor"	Top 10	Preliminary Talent Award	
1952	Helen Blackwell	Wilmington			Classical Vocal			Later, competed in Miss USA 1955 as Miss Delaware USA
1951	Suzanne Parrott	Dover			Piano			
1950	Lorna Elaine Edwardson	Dover	19		Classical Vocal, "Un Bel Di" from Madame Butterfly			
1949	No Delaware representative at Miss America pageant							
1948	No Delaware representative at Miss America pageant							
1947	No Delaware representative at Miss America pageant							
1946	No Delaware representative at Miss America pageant							
1945	No Delaware representative at Miss America pageant							
1944	Jacquelyn Vasseur	Wilmington						
1943	Mona Crawford	Wilmington						
1942	Dorothy McGovern	Wilmington						
1941	Verona Smith	Bridgeville						
1940	Peggy Insolo	Wilmington			Piano	Top 15		
1939	No Delaware representative at Miss America pageant							
1938	No Delaware representative at Miss America pageant							
1937	Nickey Harriet	Harrington						
1936	Lillian Shamers	Wilmington						
1935	No Delaware representative at Miss America pageant							
1934	No national pageant was held							
1933	Victoria A. George	Wilmington	18		N/A			
1932	No national pageants were held							
1931	No national pageants were held							
1930	No national pageants were held							
1929	No national pageants were held							
1928	No national pageants were held							
1927	No Delaware representative at Miss America pageant							
1926	No Delaware representative at Miss America pageant							
1925	No Delaware representative at Miss America pageant							
1924	No Delaware representative at Miss America pageant							
1923	Ruth Agnes Brady	Wilmington		Miss Wilmington	N/A			Competed under local title at national pageant
1922	A. Adele Senft	Wilmington		Miss Wilmington	N/A			Competed under local title at national pageant
1921	No Delaware representative at Miss America pageant							
