= Barbizon Modeling and Acting School =

American modeling and acting school

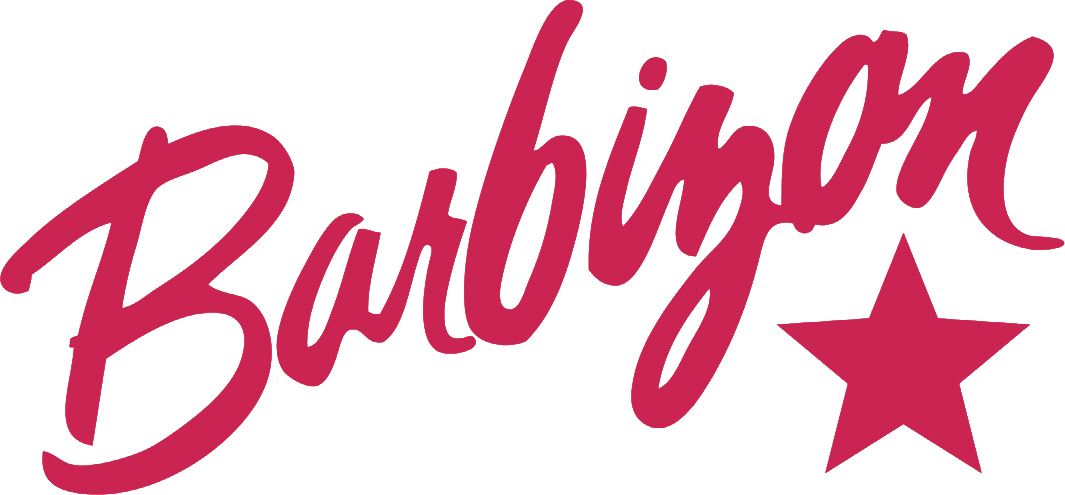

Location
- Tampa, Florida; 26.269141°N 80.249429°W

Information
- Type: Acting and modeling school
- Established: 1939 (87 years ago) in New York City, New York, United States
- Website: barbizonmodeling.com

Barbizon Modeling and Acting School is an international modeling and acting school headquartered in Tampa, Florida. It operates through licensed and franchised schools offering modeling, acting, and personal development courses. Alumni include Condoleezza Rice, Carmen Electra, and Ryan Phillippe. Barbizon established a college scholarship program in 1992 for students attending colleges and universities in the United States. The company has been the subject of class action lawsuits alleging deceptive business practices.

== History ==
Helen Fraser opened the first Barbizon School of Modeling and Acting in 1939 on Fifth Avenue in New York City. The Barbizon name was developed from her trips to the French town of Barbizon, a village outside of Paris known for the 19th-century Barbizon school of painters. Fraser was a fashion model and teacher who also wrote the book Assignment in Modeling: A Guide to a Career in Fashion and Photographic Modeling.

By 1973, Barbizon reported 37 franchisees in 18 U.S. states.

== Programs and operations ==
Barbizon operates centers in over 200 cities across the United States. Most Barbizon locations serve students aged 8 to 19, with weekend instruction over six months totaling about 48 hours; the company also offers industry placement services.

In 1992, Barbizon established a college scholarship program for students attending colleges and universities in the United States.

== Reception and criticism ==
In 2010, Illinois residents filed a class action lawsuit against a Barbizon franchise, alleging that its courses were worthless and that it misrepresented students' job prospects. According to the case record of the firm that defended Barbizon, the suit was resolved through a class-wide settlement. In 2016, a class action complaint filed in California accused the school of marketing its programs to children with false claims, citing the state's laws on advance-fee talent representation services and unfair competition. The case was settled.

A 2022 Tampa Bay Times feature on the company noted its longevity and its mixed reputation.

== Notable alumni ==
- Audrey Marie Anderson
- Nicole Gale Anderson
- David Archuleta – American Idol contestant
- Moisés Arias
- Drew Tyler Bell
- Haley Bennett
- Logan Browning
- Caressa Cameron – Miss America 2010
- Carmen Electra (Note: thanked Barbizon in her self-help book)
- Sean Faris
- Lyndsy Fonseca
- Isabel Gravitt
- Julie Henderson – model
- Madison Iseman
- June Kirby – actress and model
- Karen Montell – politician and model
- Gena Lee Nolin (Note: named Miss Barbizon)
- Tera Patrick – pornographic actress and model
- Ryan Phillippe
- Giuliana Rancic – entertainment journalist
- Condoleezza Rice – former U.S. Secretary of State (Note: in Elisabeth Bumiller's biography of Rice, Barbizon is referenced as one of Rice's early stepping stones)
- Zach Roerig
- Sofia Vassilieva
- Jill Wagner
- Faye Wong

== See also ==
- Lists of schools
