= Scottsbluff Public Schools =

School district in Nebraska, United States

Scottsbluff Public Schools, located in Scottsbluff, Nebraska, United States, is the largest school district in Scotts Bluff County. The district serves more than 2,600 students and has one high school, one middle school, and five elementary schools.

The current superintendent is Dr. Andrew Dick. The current school board members of SBPS are Ruth Kozal, president; Mark Lang; Scott Reisig; Lori Browning; Paul Snyder; and Beth Merrigan.

The high school's journalism department includes two publications: The Bluffs (yearbook) and The Echoes (newspaper).

The high school has recently seen recent additions including a geothermal system and a new commons area. Lincoln Heights, Longfellow, Roosevelt, and Westmoor Elementary Schools also renovated their air conditioning and heating units, and Westmoor added several new classrooms for the '08-'09 school year.

== Schools ==
- Scottsbluff High School
- Bluffs Middle School
- Lincoln Heights Elementary
- Longfellow Elementary
- Roosevelt Elementary
- Westmoor Elementary
- Lake Minatare Elementary
- Jawad middle school

== Athletics ==
Scottsbluff High School is a member of the Nebraska School Activities Association and the school's teams compete in the Western Conference. The school mascot is the Bearcat.

State championships
Season	Sport	Number of championships	Year
Fall	Football	1	2026
Fall	Cross country, boys	14	1960, 1961, 1967, 1996, 1997, 1998, 2000, 2003, 2004, 2005, 2010, 2011, 2013, 2014
Fall	Cross country, girls	3	1997, 1998, 2008
Fall	Volleyball	1	1976
Fall	Softball	0	
Fall	Golf, girls	9	2003, 2006, 2008, 2009, 2010, 2013, 2014, 2019, 2020
Fall	Tennis, boys	2	1979, 1984
Fall	Unified bowling	0	
Winter	Basketball, boys	4	1941, 1952, 1955, 2012
Winter	Basketball, girls	0	
Winter	Swimming, boys	0	
Winter	Swimming, girls	0	
Winter	Wrestling, boys	2	1968, 1989
Spring	Soccer, boys	6	2021, 2022, 2023, 2024, 2025, 2026
Spring	Soccer, girls	0	
Spring	Track and field, boys	7	1930, 1938, 1950, 1953, 1964, 1968, 2012
Spring	Track and field, girls	4	1976, 1977, 1978, 2007
Spring	Golf, boys	3	2010, 2013, 2015
Spring	Tennis, girls	1	1994
Total		50	

== Notable alumni ==
- Jack Todd (1965 graduate) - journalist, author, and conscientious objector.
- Teresa Scanlan (2010 graduate) - Miss Nebraska 2010; Miss America 2011
- Sabastian Harsh (2020 graduate) - American football defensive lineman
