= Sabastian Harsh =

American football player (born 2001)

No. 54 – Houston Texans
- Position: Defensive end
- Roster status: Practice squad

Personal information
- Born: November 28, 2001 (age 24); Scottsbluff, Nebraska, U.S.
- Listed height: 6 ft 2 in (1.88 m)
- Listed weight: 255 lb (116 kg)

Career information
- High school: Scottsbluff (Scottsbluff, Nebraska)
- College: Wyoming (2020–2024); NC State (2025)
- NFL draft: 2026: undrafted

Career history
- Houston Texans (2026–present)

Career NFL statistics as of Week 9, 2026
- Total tackles: 8
- Sacks: 0.5
- Stats at Pro Football Reference

Sabastian Harsh (born November 28, 2001) is an American professional football defensive end for the Houston Texans of the National Football League (NFL). He played college football for the Wyoming Cowboys and the NC State Wolfpack.

== Early life ==
Harsh played high school football at Scottsbluff High School in Nebraska where he was a quarterback, linebacker, and punter. During his senior season, he rushed for over 2,000 yards and 35 touchdowns and threw for 874 yards and 11 more touchdowns. On the defensive side of the ball he accrued 66 tackles, 9.5 tackles for loss, 3 sacks, one interception, 4 forced fumbles, and 8 quarterback hurries. He also averaged 42 yards per punt including a 79 yard punt in the state championship.

On January 26, 2020, Harsh announced his decision to accept an offer to play college football at Wyoming as a preferred walk-on. Harsh chose Wyoming over a walk-on offer from Nebraska and scholarship offers from Division II schools Nebraska–Kearney and Chadron State.

== College career ==
=== Wyoming ===
As a true freshman at Wyoming, Harsh did not appear in any games. He was awarded a scholarship ahead of the 2021 season. In 2021, he appeared in every game, playing mostly on special teams. He sat out the entire 2022 season due to a knee injury before appearing in 12 games, and starting in 8, during the 2023 season. During his final season for the Cowboys, Harsh missed four games due to injury. He finished the season with 40 tackles, 9 tackles for loss, and 1.5 sacks and earned All-Mountain West Honorable Mention recognition.

On March 14, 2025, Harsh announced that he would enter the transfer portal.

=== NC State ===
On April 5, 2025, Harsh announced that he was transferring to NC State.

== Professional career ==
Pre-draft measurables
Height	Weight	Arm length	Hand span	Wingspan	40-yard dash	10-yard split	20-yard split	20-yard shuttle	Three-cone drill	Vertical jump	Broad jump	Bench press
6 ft 1 7/8 in (1.88 m)	255 lb (116 kg)	31 3/8 in (0.80 m)	9 5/8 in (0.24 m)	6 ft 5 1/8 in (1.96 m)	4.66 s	1.62 s	2.72 s	4.63 s	7.22 s	28.0 in (0.71 m)	9 ft 2 in (2.79 m)	28 reps
All values from Pro Day

On May 8, 2026, Harsh signed with the Houston Texans as an undrafted free agent. On August 30, 2026, he made the initial 53-man roster. He was waived on November 14, and re-signed on November 17.
