= Jamie Ginn =

American beauty pageant contestant

Jamie Ginn Piazza
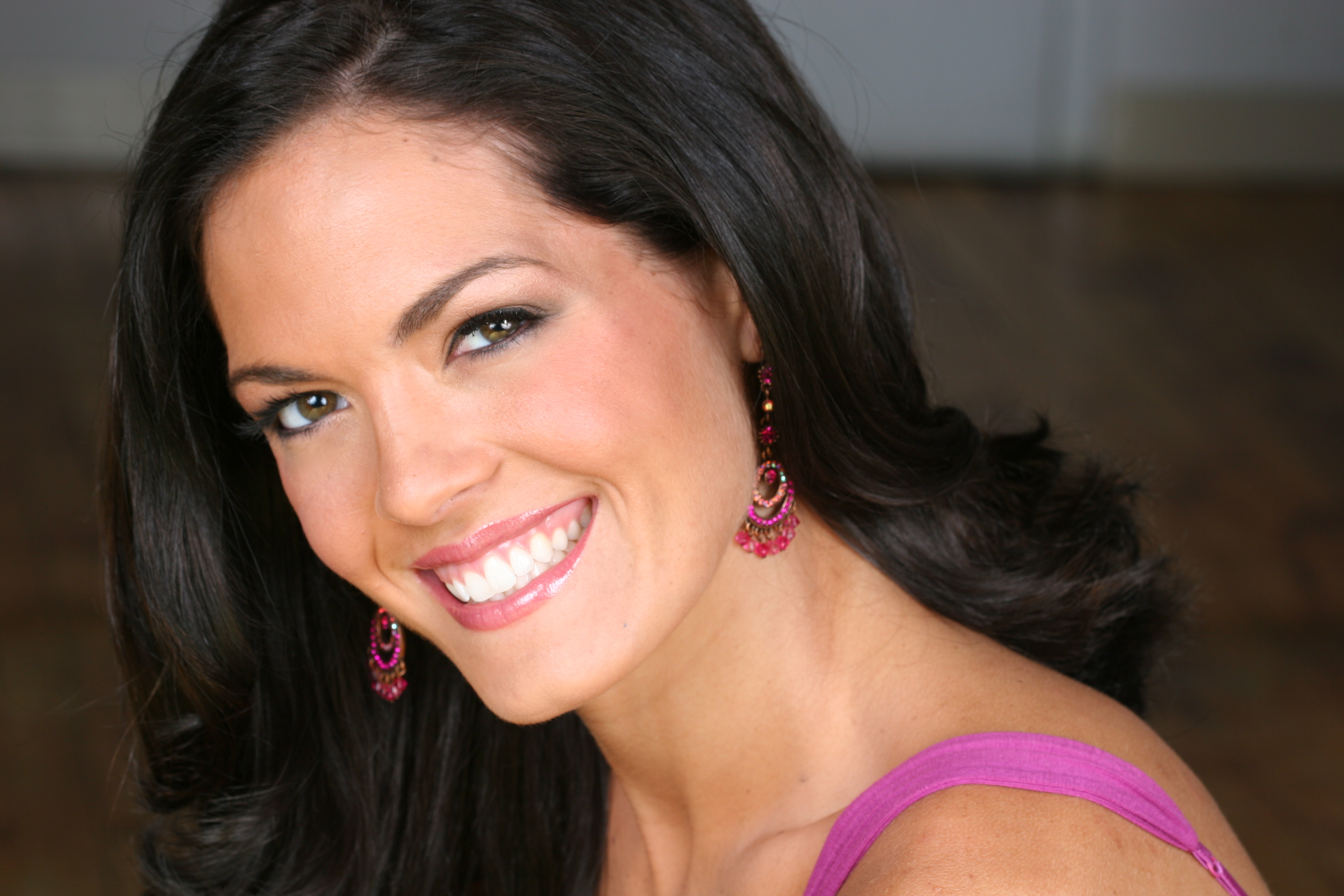
- Jamie Ginn, Miss Delaware 2006
- Born: Jamie Ginn; January 7, 1982 (age 44); Ocean City, New Jersey United States
- Education: Rowan University
- Beauty pageant titleholder
- Title: Miss Brandywine 2006; Miss Delaware 2006
- Hair color: Brunette
- Eye color: Brown
- Major competition: Miss America 2007
- Website: www.jamieginn.com

Jamie Ginn Piazza (born January 7, 1982) was Miss Delaware 2006 and competed in the Miss America 2007 competition, which was won by Lauren Nelson of Oklahoma.

Piazza (formerly Ginn), originally of Ocean City, New Jersey, had competed previously in the Miss New Jersey competition and placed as First Runner-Up. She was also the fourth runner-up in the 2006 National Sweetheart competition, held annually in Hoopeston, Illinois.

Ginn was a Top 3 Finalist during the reality television special Pageant School, leading up to the Miss America competition.

Her pageant platform was finding a cure for Crohn's disease and colitis.

Ginn holds a Bachelor of Science degree in chemical engineering from Rowan University and worked at DuPont until 2014.

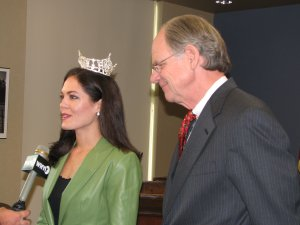
Congressman Michael Castle with Jamie Ginn, Miss Delaware 2006.

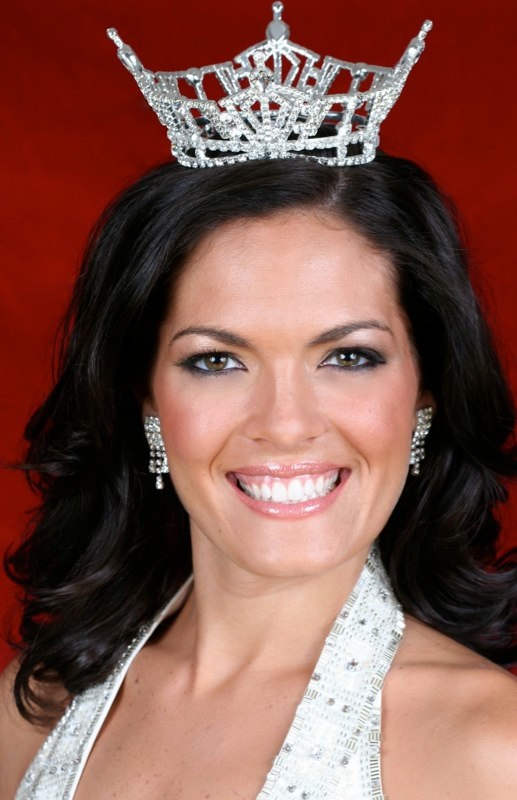
Jamie Ginn was crowned Miss Delaware 2006 and placed as 4th Runner-Up for National Sweetheart.

Awards and achievements
Preceded by Rebecca Bledsoe	Miss Delaware; 2006	Succeeded by Brittany Dempsey
