= Kayla Martell =

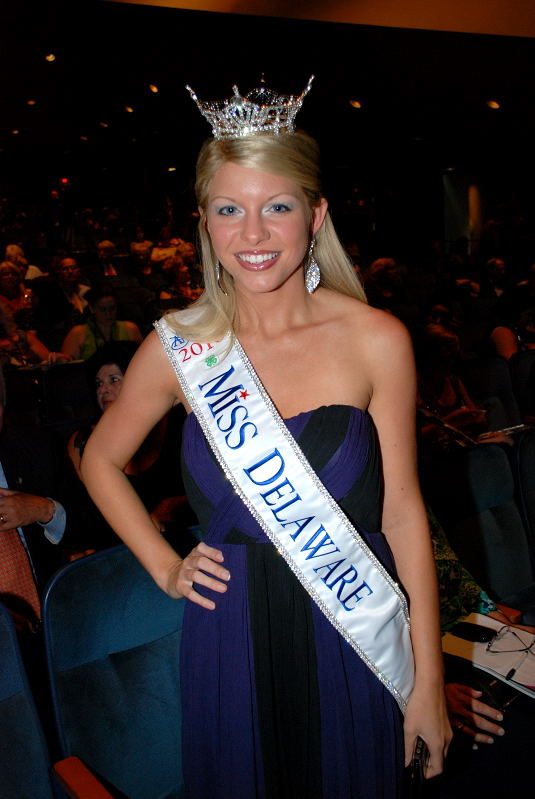
- Born: Kayla Martell; June 27, 1988 (age 38); Milford, Delaware, U.S.
- Beauty pageant titleholder
- Title: Miss Sussex County 2006; Miss Indian River 2007; Miss Georgetown 2008; Miss Newark 2009; Miss Kent County 2010; Miss Delaware 2010
- Major competition: Miss America 2011 (Top 10)

Kayla Martell (born June 27, 1989) is an American beauty queen from Milford, Delaware and the winner of the Miss Delaware 2010 pageant. Martell placed in the Top 10 at the Miss America 2011 pageant. In the fifth grade, Martell was diagnosed with alopecia areata and subsequently lost all her hair. Martell had competed in the Miss Delaware pageant four other times; three times without a wig. Martell plans to use her platform to raise awareness for alopecia areata. Martell had previously won Miss Kent County in order to compete in the Miss Delaware competition. During the state competition, she also won the pageant community service award, the state community service award, and the Thursday evening gown and Friday swimsuit competitions. Martell made it to a semifinalist round in the 2011 Miss America pageant, becoming the first bald contestant in Miss America history.

Preceded by Heather Lehman	Miss Delaware; 2010	Succeeded by Maria Cahill
