= Miss Nebraska's Teen =

- Formation: 2005
- Type: Scholarship pageant
- Location: North Platte, Nebraska
- Members: Miss America's Teen
- Official language: English
- Key people: Megan Doughtey; Jodi Miller Holen
- Website: Official website

The Miss Nebraska's Teen competition is the pageant that selects the representative for the U.S. state of Nebraska in the Miss America's Teen pageant.

Ella-Kathryn Anderson of Scottsbluff was crowned Miss Nebraska's Teen on June 6, 2026, at the North Platte HS Performing Arts Center in North Platte, Nebraska. She competed for the title of Miss America's Teen 2027 on September 5, 2026, at the Kravis Center for the Performing Arts in West Palm Beach, Florida.

== Results summary ==
The results of Miss Nebraska's Outstanding Teen as they participated in the national Miss America's Outstanding Teen competition. The year in parentheses indicates the year of the Miss America's Outstanding Teen competition the award/placement was garnered.

=== Placements ===
- 4th runners-up: Morgan Holen (2015), Rose Chen (2022)
- Top 10: Steffany Lien (2016)
- Top 15: Phoenix Stanford (2020)

=== Awards ===
==== Preliminary awards ====
- Preliminary Evening Wear/On Stage Question: Brooke Ludemann (2012), Hannah Miller (2017)

==== Non-finalist awards ====
- Non-finalist Evening Wear/On Stage Question: Hannah Miller (2017)
- Non-finalist Interview: Hannah Miller (2017)

==== Other awards ====
- Outstanding Dance Talent Award: Morgan Holen (2015)
- Top 5 Interview Award: Hannah Miller (2017), Phoenix Stanford (2020)
- Miss Congeniality/Most Inspirational Award: Janae Harris (2025)
- Teens in Action Award Finalist: Ella-Kathryn Anderson (2027)

== Winners ==
- Declared as winner
- Ended as a runner-up
- Ended as a finalist or semi-finalist

Year	Name	Hometown	Age	Local title	Talent	Placement at MAO Teen	Special scholarships at MAO Teen	Notes
2026	Ella-Kathryn Anderson	Scottsbluff	18	Miss Douglas County’s Teen	Vocal		Teens in Action Award Finalist	
2025	Gabriella Swift	North Platte	18	Miss Douglas County's Teen	Contemporary Dance			
2024	Janae Harris	Omaha	17	Miss Lincoln's Teen	Contemporary Dance		Most Inspirational/Miss Congeniality Award	
2023	Boston Pettera	North Platte		Miss Alliance's Teen	Baton Twirling			
2022	Alexandra Thompson	North Platte	14	Miss Alliance's Outstanding Teen	Vocal			
2021	Rose Chen	Scottsbluff	17	Miss Scotts Bluff County's Outstanding Teen	Piano, "Tarantella in A Minor"	4th runner-up		
2019-20	Phoenix Stanford	Papillion	15	Miss Douglas County's Outstanding Teen	Vocal, "Dream On"	Top 15		First Asian-American to win Miss Nebraska's Outstanding Teen
2018	Kelsie Therkildsen	Bennington	15	Miss Metro's Outstanding Teen	Jazz Dance, "Swing with Me"			
2017	Carsyn Long	Gering	17	Miss Kearney's Outstanding Teen	Vocal			3rd runner-up at Miss Nebraska 2019 competition
2016	Hannah Miller	Elkhorn		Miss Omaha's Outstanding Teen	Dance		Non-finalist Evening Wear/OSQ Award Non-finalist Interview Award Preliminary Evening Wear/OSQ Award Top 5 Interview Award	
2015	Steffany Lien	Omaha	17	Miss Douglas County's Outstanding Teen	Baton Twirl, "Hollywood" by Michael Bublé	Top 10		Six-time world champion baton twirler Later University of Louisville's Cardinal Girl Feature Twirler Later Miss Nebraska 2022
2014	Morgan Holen	Omaha			Dance	4th runner-up	Outstanding Dance Talent Award	Daughter of Miss Nebraska 1988, Jodi Miller Holen Later Distinguished Young Woman of Nebraska 2016; Top 10 at Distinguished Young Woman 2016 national finals Later Miss Nebraska 2021
2013	Samantha Washington	Lincoln	15	Miss Omaha's Outstanding Teen	Vocal			First African American woman to hold title of Miss Nebraska's Outstanding Teen Later Miss Nebraska Teen USA 2017 First woman in Nebraska to hold teen titles in both the Miss America and Miss USA organizations 2nd runner-up at Miss Nebraska USA 2019 and 2020 pageants
2012	Lianna Prill	Holdrege	17	Miss Sandhills' Outstanding Teen	Vocal			2nd runner-up at Miss Nebraska 2016 pageant 3rd runner-up at Miss Nebraska 2017 pageant
2011	Brooke Ludemann	North Platte	17	Miss Northwest's Outstanding Teen	Vocal		Preliminary Evening Wear/OSQ Award	2nd runner-up at Miss Nebraska 2015 pageant
2010	Staci Craighead	Omaha	17		Vocal			Daughter of former Nebraska state senator, Joni Craighead
2009	JaCee Pilkington	Minatare	17		Vocal			Later Miss Nebraska 2013
2008	Rachel Foehlinger	Ralston		Miss Omaha's Outstanding Teen	Baton Twirl			Sister of Christina Foehlinger, Miss Nebraska 2001 1st runner-up at Miss Nebraska 2013 pageant 2nd runner-up at Miss Nebraska 2012 and 2014 pageants Contestant at National Sweetheart 2014 pageant
2007	Kayla Batt	Alliance			Vocal		Spirit Award	Top 10 at National Sweetheart 2010 pageant Later Miss Nebraska 2011
2006	Sharla Schreiber	Columbus	16		Jazz/Flag Dance			
2005	Jessica States	North Platte	17		Vocal, "I Am What I Am" from La Cage aux Folles			
