= Gering High School =

Public school in Nebraska

Coordinates: 41°49′56″N 103°40′2″W

Location
- 1500 U Street; Gering, (Scotts Bluff County), Nebraska 69341; United States

Information
- Type: Public high school
- Principal: Mario Chavez
- Staff: 37.63 (FTE)
- Enrollment: 581 (2022-23)
- Student to teacher ratio: 15.44
- Colors: Blue and gold
- Athletics conference: Western Conference
- Nickname: Bulldogs

Gering High School (GHS) is the only high school in Gering, Nebraska, United States. It is located at 1500 U Street. It has an enrollment of over 625 students, with a student to teacher ratio of 18:1. GHS offers a full range of academic courses as well as art, journalism and music programs. Many extracurricular after-school clubs and sports programs are available. The school was the first in the district to use block scheduling, the practice of having four one-and-a-half-hour classes that alternate every other day. In 2007 the Freshmen Academy was created to provide a transition for junior high students to high school. The Freshmen Academy mimics the high school block schedule, while maintaining a smaller more cohesive environment for the freshmen students.

The representative for Nebraska's 3rd District, Adrian Smith, graduated from Gering High School in 1989.

== General information ==
Gering High School is a campus with more than 50 certified staff and 20 classified staff to serve the students. Students are offered course selections that include both academic and vocational choices as well as a host of specialties in fine and performing arts and a full complement of extra-curricular activities. The school offers college preparatory and college credit classes, as well as special needs classes. Updates to the facility include a new vocational building in 2007 and new and remodeled science classrooms in 2008.

== Mascot ==
Gering schools use a mascot known as Brutus the Bulldog, with school colors of blue and gold.

== Test scores ==
According to the STARS standardized test for 2009, 92% of 11th graders were proficient in reading, while 80% were proficient in science, 97% were proficient in writing and 84% were proficient in math.
