= Sareh Nouri =

Persian-American fashion designer (born 1979)

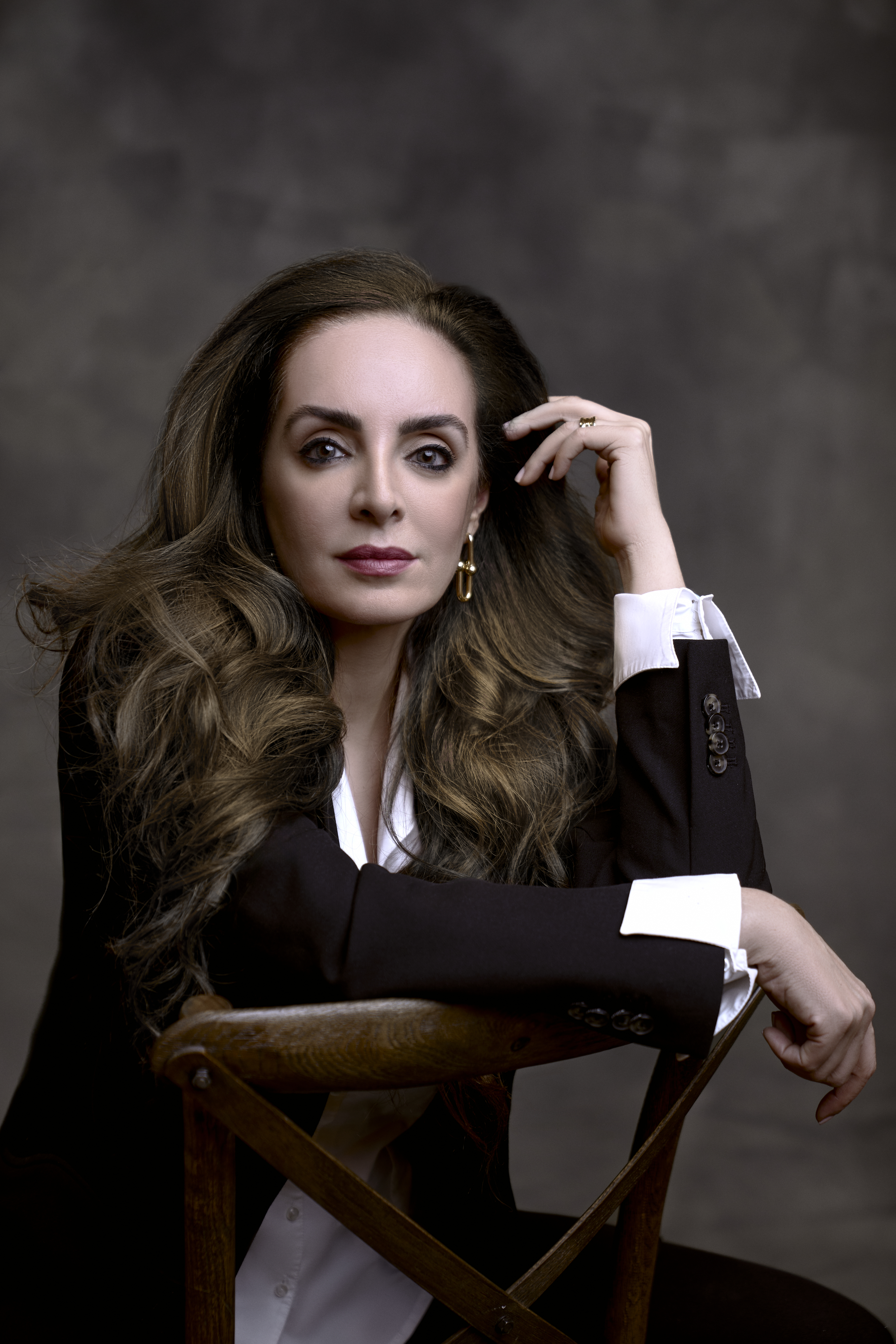
- Sareh Nouri
- Born: July 25, 1979 (age 46); Tehran, Iran
- Education: George Mason University
- Occupation: Fashion designer
- Known for: Couture wedding gowns, bridal sashes
- Label: Sareh Nouri Bridal, LLC

Sareh Nouri (Persian: ساره نوری) is a Persian-American fashion designer known for her eponymous bridal line of wedding dresses, luxury robes, and evening wear.

== Early life ==
Sareh Nouri was born in Tehran, Iran, and immigrated to the United States in 1989 at the age of nine. Her family lived in northern Virginia. She received her B.A in graphic design from George Mason University. She is frequently cited as a notable alumna from the university.

Before venturing into wedding dress design, Nouri worked on various commercial and non-profit media ads as a graphic designer.

== Career ==
After designing her own wedding dress in 2009, Nouri began working in the bridal industry in various roles at high end bridal salons, eventually being promoted to buyer and director of sales. She began making wedding dresses under her own name in 2011, launching a couture bridal label of wedding dresses manufactured in the US. Now, herbridal designs have risen to popularity and are sold in upscale bridal boutiques and luxury department stores across the US, most notably in New York City; Dallas, Texas; Atlanta, Georgia; North Carolina; and Connecticut.

Nouri has also launched a collection of luxury bridal robes.

== Personal life ==
Nouri was married in 2009 in Washington, D.C. at the Ritz-Carlton. She and her husband share twin daughters.

== In the media ==
Nouri's bridal design collections have been featured in Vogue.

Bridal collections and interviews by Nouri have been featured in various bridal magazines and websites including The Knot, Martha Stewart Weddings, Wedding Wire, Premier Brides, and Inside Weddings. Modern Luxury Weddings featured Nouri on the cover of their July 2020 issue.

Nouri's wedding dresses are sold at luxury department stores including Neiman Marcus and Bergdorf Goodman. Her designs are also available at Kleinfeld, the bridal boutique known as the setting of the television series Say Yes to the Dress.

Nouri designed the wedding gown for former American Idol contestant Diana DeGarmo.

Nouri's first flagship store opened on June 1, 2021 at the Livingston Town Center in Livingston, New Jersey. Nouri's second flagship location opened in Chevy Chase, Maryland in June, 2025.
