= Caressa Cameron =

American beauty pageant titleholder and singer

Caressa Cameron Jackson
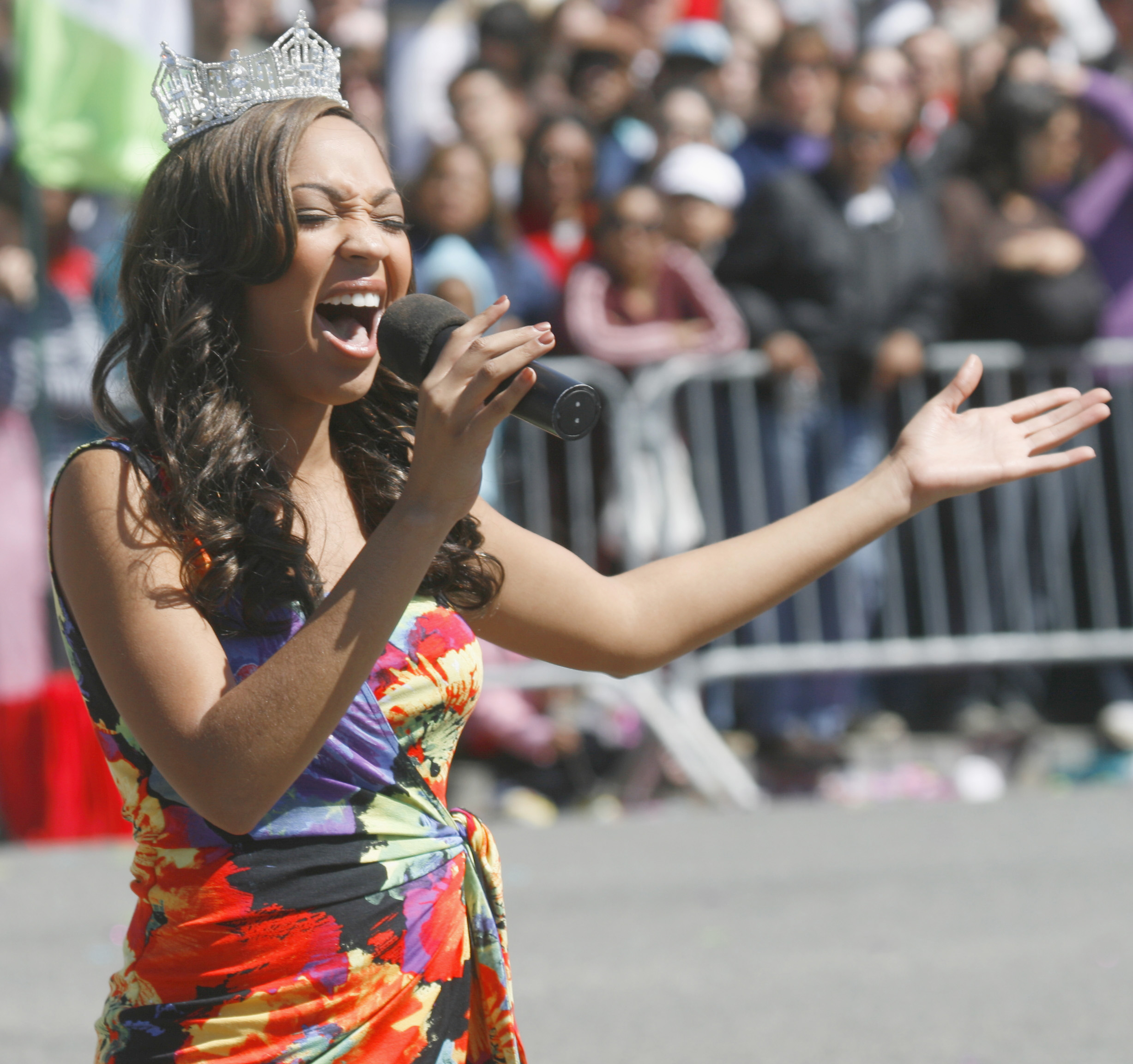
- Caressa performing in the Cherry Blossom Festival parade
- Born: August 4, 1987 (age 39); Fredericksburg, Virginia, U.S.
- Education: Massaponax High School; Virginia Commonwealth University; Barbizon Modeling and Acting School
- Title: Miss Virginia 2009; Miss America 2010
- Term: January 30, 2010 – January 15, 2011
- Predecessor: Katie Stam
- Successor: Teresa Scanlan
- Spouse: Nathaniel Jackson Jr. (m. 2012)
- Children: 2
- Website: http://www.caressacameronlive.com

Caressa Venal Cameron-Jackson (born August 4, 1987) is an American beauty pageant titleholder and occasional singer from Fredericksburg, Virginia who was Miss Virginia 2009 and Miss America 2010. She is the eighth African American Miss America titleholder, the first Black Miss Virginia to be crowned Miss America.

== Early life and education ==
The Virginia native is a graduate of Massaponax High School and Virginia Commonwealth University. In 2002, Cameron graduated from Barbizon Modeling and Acting School in Virginia.

== Pageantry ==
=== Before 2009 ===
Cameron placed second runner-up to Tori Hall at the Miss Virginia Teen USA 2005 pageant. She was second runner-up to Amber Copley at the Miss Virginia USA 2006 pageant. She was placed second runner-up in the 2006 and 2007 Miss Virginia pageants. At the 2008 competition, Cameron was named first runner-up. Due to this placement, Cameron qualified to compete in the National Sweetheart 2008 pageant, where Miss Virginia later was named the fourth runner-up.

=== Miss Virginia 2009 ===
Cameron was crowned Miss Virginia on June 28, 2009, winning on her fourth attempt.

=== Miss America 2010 ===
On January 27, 2010, the performer won a $2,000 scholarship in succeeding the preliminary talent competition in vocal pop.

On January 30, 2010, Cameron won the Miss America 2010 pageant held at Planet Hollywood in Las Vegas, Nevada.

== Miss America role ==
She traveled more than 250,000 miles during her year of service advocating for her personal platform, "Real Talk: AIDS in America" and spoke to over 80,000 students around the nation about healthy choices. For her efforts, Caressa was the recipient of the President’s Volunteer Service Award and a Congressional Honor. The titleholder performed during the Presidential Inauguration festivities in 2009, the 2010 White House Christmas Tree lighting, and more.

== Personal life ==
Cameron married her high school sweetheart, Nathaniel Jackson Jr., on December 2, 2012. Cameron wore a Sareh Nouri wedding gown.

== Video clips ==
- "Miss America 2010 Caressa Cameron sings God Bless America" video, Miss America 2010 Caressa Cameron sings "God Bless America" at the Independence Day Parade in Philadelphia on July 4, 2010.

Awards and achievements
Preceded by Katie Stam	Miss America; 2010	Succeeded by Teresa Scanlan
Preceded by Tara Wheeler	Miss Virginia; 2009	Succeeded by Chinah Helmandollar
