= Miss Nebraska =

Beauty pageant competition

- Formation: 1925
- Type: Beauty pageant
- Headquarters: Omaha
- Location: Nebraska
- Members: Miss America
- Official language: English
- Website: Official website

The Miss Nebraska competition is the pageant that selects the representative for the state of Nebraska in the Miss America pageant.

Lexi Nolda of North Platte was crowned Miss Nebraska on June 6, 2026, at North Platte HS Performing Arts Center in North Platte. She competed for the title of Miss America 2027 on September 6, 2026, at the Kravis Center for the Performing Arts in West Palm Beach, Florida.

== Gallery of past titleholders ==
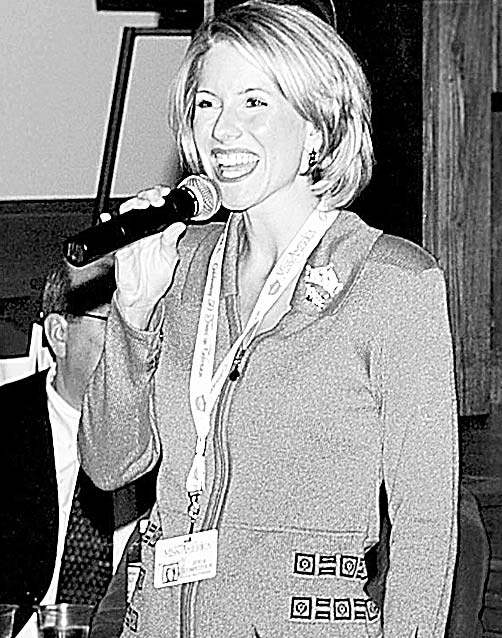
Brook Matthews,
Miss Nebraska 2004

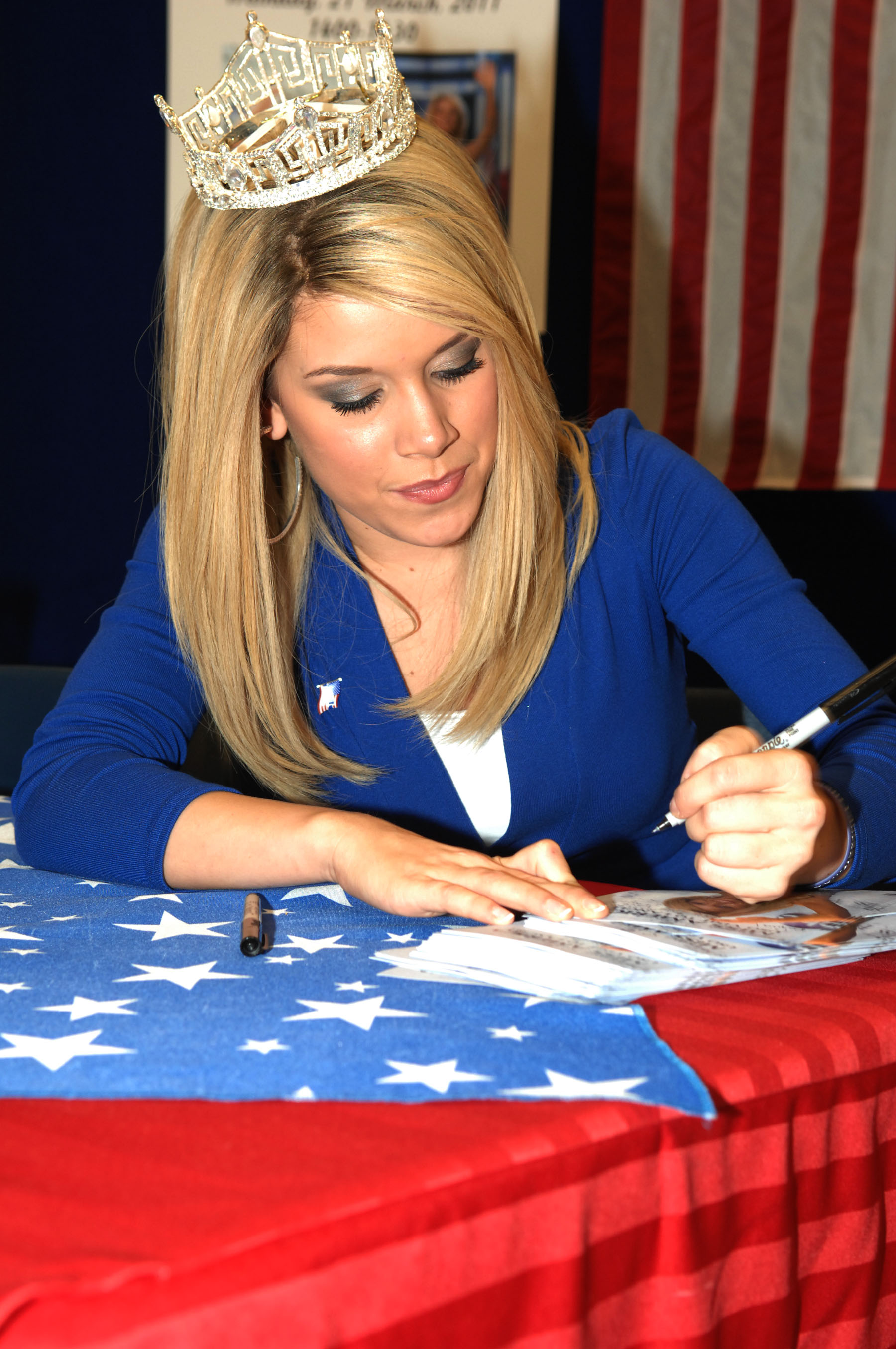
Teresa Scanlan,
Miss Nebraska 2010 & Miss America 2011

== Results summary ==
The following is a visual summary of the past results of Miss Nebraska titleholders at the national Miss America pageants/competitions. The year in parentheses indicates the year of the national competition during which a placement and/or award was garnered, not the year attached to the contestant's state title.

=== Placements ===
- Miss America: Teresa Scanlan (2011)
- Top 10: Mary Lee Jepsen (1963), Guylyn Remmenga (1979), Kristin Lowenberg (1984), Brittany Jeffers (2010), Jessica Shultis (2019)
- Top 12: Alyssa Howell (2016)
- Top 15: Myrtle Roach (1925)
- Top 20: Christina Foehlinger (2002)

=== Awards ===
==== Preliminary awards ====
- Preliminary Lifestyle and Fitness: Molly McGrath (2007)
- Preliminary Talent: Diane Knotek (1957), Mary Lee Jepsen (1963) (tie), Guylyn Remmenga (1979) (tie), Teresa Scanlan (2011)

==== Non-finalist awards ====
- Non-finalist Talent: Madalyn Joyce King (1947), Diane Knotek (1957), Catherine "Kay" Nielson (1958), Sherry Johnson (1959), Patricia Lee Van Horne (1967), Linda Kay Hallstrom (1978), Paula Louise Mitchell (1981), Allison Boyd (1985), Julie Meusburger (1986), Vicki Linn Train (1992), Myra Katherine Hale (1996), Kendra Quandt (1998), Jane Noseworthy (2004), Kayla Batt (2012), Steffany Lien (2023)
- Non-finalist Interview: Jill Pennington (2001), Aleah Peters (2017)

==== Other awards ====
- Miss Congeniality: Jane Deliese Briggeman (1970), Kayla Batt (2012)
- Quality of Life Award 1st runners-up: Kendra Quandt (1998)
- Quality of Life Award 2nd runners-up: Myra Katherine Hale (1996)
- Quality of Life Award Finalists: Vicki Linn Train (1992)
- STEM Scholarship Award Finalists: Allison Tietjen (2018)
- Tiffany Phillips Scholar-Athlete Scholarship: Allie Swanson (2020)
- Women in Business 1st runner-up: Morgan Holen (2022)
- Women in Business Scholarship Award Finalists: Jessica Shultis (2019)

== Winners ==
- Declared as winner
- Ended as a runner-up
- Ended as a finalist or semi-finalist

Year	Name	Hometown	Age	Local Title	Miss America Talent	Placement at Miss America	Special scholarships at Miss America	Notes
2026	Lexi Nolda	North Platte	22	Miss Fremont	Contemporary Dance			
2025	Makinzie Gergory	Scottsbluff	25	Miss Old West Balloon Fest	Lyrical Dance			
2024	Raechel Warren	Omaha	28	Miss Douglas County	Roller Figure Skating, "Song Must Go On"			Previously Miss Iowa Volunteer 2022
2023	Morgan Baird	Gering	21	Miss Scotts Bluff County	Contemporary Dance			
2022	Steffany Lien	Lincoln	24	Miss Lincoln	Dance Twirl		Non-finalist Talent Award	Previously Miss Nebraska's Outstanding Teen 2015
2021	Morgan Hope Holen	Omaha	23	Miss Omaha	Dance		Women in Business 1st runner-up	Daughter of Miss Nebraska 1988, Jodi Sue Miller Holen Previously Miss Nebraska's Outstanding Teen 2014; 4th runner-up at Miss America's Outstanding Teen 2015 Previously Distinguished Young Woman of Nebraska 2016; Top 10 at Distinguished Young Woman 2016
2020	Title vacant; state and national pageants postponed due to the COVID-19 pandemic							
2019	Allie Swanson	Omaha	24	Miss Heartland	Vocal		Tiffany Phillips Scholar-Athlete Scholarship	Sister of Miss Nebraska 2014 and Miss Nebraska USA 2020, Megan Swanson Resigned the title due to subsequent marriage
2018	Jessica Shultis	Dannebrog	24	Miss Lincoln	Original Monologue	Top 10	Women in Business Scholarship Finalist	Semifinalist at Miss Nebraska USA 2016 and 2020 competitions
2017	Allison Tietjen	Chester	21	Miss Heartland	Piano, "The Phantom of the Opera"		STEM Scholarship Finalist	
2016	Aleah Peters	Omaha		Miss Omaha	Baton Twirling, "Wings"		Non-finalist Interview Award	
2015	Alyssa Howell	Omaha	20	Miss Douglas County	Piano, "Northern Lights"	Top 12		
2014	Megan Swanson	Omaha	21	Miss Douglas County	Vocal, "You Raise Me Up"			Sister of Miss Nebraska 2019, Allie Swanson Later Miss Nebraska USA 2020
2013	Jacee Pilkington	Minatare	21	Miss Western Nebraska	Vocal, "How Great Thou Art"			Previously Miss Nebraska's Outstanding Teen 2009
2012	Mariah Cook	Chadron	23	Miss State Fair	Piano, "Malagueña"			
2011	Kayla Batt	Alliance	21	Miss Omaha	Vocal, "Love You I Do"		Miss Congeniality Non-finalist Talent Award	Previously Miss Nebraska's Outstanding Teen 2007; Top 10 at National Sweetheart 2010
2010	Nicky Haverland		24	Miss Douglas County		Did not compete; originally 3rd runner-up, later assumed title after Scanlan won Miss America 2011		
2010	Teresa Scanlan	Gering	17	Miss Southeast	Piano, "White Water Chopped Sticks" by Calvin Jones	Winner	Preliminary Talent Award	Youngest Miss Nebraska ever crowned Later Miss Nebraska World 2015, 1st runner up at Miss World America 2015
2009	Brittany Jeffers	Ogallala	23	Miss Omaha	Dance, "So Much Better" from Legally Blonde	Top 10		Top 10 at National Sweetheart 2007 pageant
2008	Gretchen Bergquist	Oxford	22	Miss Panhandle	Vocal, "Feeling Good"			
2007	Ashley Bauer	Scottsbluff	22	Miss Douglas County	Vocal, "This Is my Life"'			Contestant at National Sweetheart 2006 pageant
2006	Molly McGrath	Omaha	23	Miss Sarpy County	Jazz Dance, "She Bangs"		Preliminary Lifestyle & Fitness Award	
2005	Kelly Keiser	Gothenburg	21	Miss Lincoln	Piano, "Cumana"			Contestant at National Sweetheart 2004 pageant
2004	Brook Matthews	Blair	24	Miss Omaha	Vocal, "Shine It On"			Contestant at National Sweetheart 2003 pageant
2003	Jane Noseworthy	Bellevue	24	Miss Omaha	Classical Vocal, "Art Is Calling for Me" from The Enchantress		Non-finalist Talent Award	
2002	Krista Knicely	Omaha	23	Miss Douglas County	Jazz Dance, "I'm a Woman"			
2001	Christina Foehlinger	Ralston	21	Miss Tri-Cities	Baton Twirling, Theme from Robin Hood: Prince of Thieves	Top 20		Sister of Miss Nebraska's Outstanding Teen 2008, Rachel Foehlinger
2000	Jill Pennington	Omaha	23	Miss Great Plains	Vocal, "If I Loved You"		Non-finalist Interview Award	
1999	Becky Smith	Omaha	20	Miss Omaha	Ballet en Pointe, Music from Kiss of the Spider Woman			
1998	Jenny Lemmerman	West Point	20	Miss Great Plains	Vocal, "I'm a Woman"			
1997	Kendra Quandt	Davenport	23	Miss Western Nebraska	Classical Piano, "Prelude in C sharp minor" by Rachmaninoff		Non-finalist Talent Award Quality of Life Award 1st runner-up	
1996	Rachel Scott	Columbus	19	Miss Columbus	Vocal, "Via Dolorosa"			
1995	Myra Katherine Hale	Lincoln	23	Miss Douglas County	Classical Piano		Non-finalist Talent Award Quality of Life Award 2nd runner-up	
1994	Jennifer Love	North Platte	21	Miss High Plains	Classical Vocal, "Romany Life" from The Fortune Teller			
1993	Mary Lynn Schnitzler	Battle Creek	23	Miss Norfolk Area	Vocal, "Someone Like You" from Jekyll & Hyde			
1992	Natalie Kuijvenhoven	Lincoln	21	Miss Great Plains	Vocal, "Can't Help Lovin' Dat Man"			
1991	Vicki Linn Train	North Platte	24	Miss Great Plains	Piano, "Prelude" from Pour le piano		Non-finalist Talent Award Quality of Life Award Finalist	
1990	Michelle Ebadi	Omaha	23	Miss Western Nebraska	Tap Dance, "Sing, Sing, Sing" & "Puttin' on the Ritz"			
1989	Kristi Hilliard	Ogallala	24	Miss Great Plains	Vocal "Golden Rainbow"			
1988	Jodi Sue Miller	Omaha	20	Miss Omaha	Acrobatic Jazz Dance			Previously Nebraska's Junior Miss 1986 Mother of Miss Nebraska's Outstanding Teen 2014 and Miss Nebraska 2021, Morgan Hope Holen
1987	Mindee Zimmerman	Norfolk	23	Miss Platte Valley	Vocal, "People"			
1986	Donna Schieffer	Columbus	19	Miss Columbus Area	Modern Dance			
1985	Julie Meusburger	Lincoln	22	Miss River City	Flute, Carmen Fantasy		Non-finalist Talent Award	
1984	Allison Boyd	Nebraska City	21	Miss University of Nebraska	Acrobatic Dance		Non-finalist Talent Award	
1983	Kristin Lowenberg	Kearney	20	Miss Kearney Area	Jazz Dance, "What a Feeling"	Top 10		
1982	Sandra Haschke	Humphrey	20	Miss Lincoln Area	Popular Vocal, "All I Ever Need Is You"			
1981	Jill Pershing	Lincoln	21	Miss Lincoln	Ballet en Pointe, Rhapsody in Blue			
1980	Paula Louise Mitchell	Norfolk	20	Miss University of Nebraska	Piano, "Toccata in E-flat minor" by Khachaturian		Non-finalist Talent Award	Mother of Miss Nebraska Teen USA 2015, Paige Pflueger
1979	Kathryn Ann Saathoff	Fremont	21	Miss Midland Lutheran College	Vocal, "It Don't Mean a Thing (If It Ain't Got That Swing)"			
1978	Guylyn Remmenga	Elwood	21	Miss University of Nebraska-Lincoln	Piano, "Toccata" & "Nocturne"	Top 10	Preliminary Talent Award (tie)	Previously National Sweetheart 1976
1977	Linda Kay Hallstrom	Omaha	18	Miss Eastern Nebraska Area	Jazz Dance		Non-finalist Talent Award	
1976	Marion Catherine Watson	Omaha	22	Miss Lancaster County	Vocal, "Over the Rainbow"			
1975	Janet Kay Goode	Omaha	19	Miss Omaha	Dramatic Skit, "Why?"			Previously Miss Nebraska World 1974
1974	Sharon Sue Pelc	Johnstown	22	Miss Ord	Ventriloquism & Singing, "Those Were the Days"			
1973	Sandy Cramer	Omaha	18	Miss Omaha	Acrobatic Jazz Dance, "I'm an Ordinary Man"			
1972	Jeanine Giller	Omaha	22	Miss Omaha	Jazz Dance, "Bitter End"			
1971	Sally Lou Warner	Bushnell	19	Miss Kimball	Vocal, "Big Spender"			
1970	Debra May Sullivan	Omaha	19	Miss Omaha	Acrobatic Dance, "Fly Me to the Moon"			
1969	Jane Deliese Briggeman	Seward	21	Miss York	Musical Interpretation, "I'm Always Chasing Rainbows" & Fantaisie-Impromptu		Miss Congeniality	
1968	Diane Boldt	Omaha	19	Miss Kearney	Character Dance			
1967	Terry Lee Schmidt	Lincoln	18	Miss University of Nebraska	Drawing & Reading, "What Is a Girl?" by Alan Beck			
1966	Patricia Lee Van Horne	Lincoln	19	Miss Lincoln	Popular Vocal, "Misty"		Non-finalist Talent Award	
1965	Karen Hansmeire	Ogallala	20	Miss Ogallala	Semi-classical Vocal, "Love Is Where you Find It"			
1964	Sandra Lee Rice	Cozad	20	Miss Lexington	Dramatic Reading from After the Fall			
1963	Donna Marie Black	Broken Bow		Miss Grand Island	Classical Vocal, "Una Voce Poco Fa" from The Barber of Seville			
1962	Mary Lee Jepsen	Papillion	18	Miss Papillion	Fire Baton Twirling, "Ritual Fire Dance"	Top 10	Preliminary Talent Award (tie)	
1961	Nancy Lee Foreman	Albion	20	Miss Albion	Dramatic Reading, "Such Is Your Heritage"			
1960	Cheryl Ann Jaeke	Shelton	18	Miss Grand Island	Vocal			
1959	Joan Arolyn Sipes	Columbus	19		Piano, "Transcendental Étude No. 4 in D minor" by Liszt			
1958	Sherry Johnson	Omaha			Monologue		Non-finalist Talent Award	
1957	Catherine Lucille "Kay" Nielson	Lincoln	20		Modern Interpretive Dance		Non-finalist Talent Award	Later Miss Iowa USA 1959
1956	Diane Knotek	Lincoln			Classical Vocal, "The Polonaise"		Non-finalist Talent Award Preliminary Talent Award	
1955	Sandra Spiecher	Omaha			Speech, "Teaching Handicapped Students"			
1954	Sue Welch Fisher	Kearney			Classical Vocal, "Un bel dì vedremo" from Madama Butterfly			
1953	Diana Louise Hann	Lincoln			Art			
1952	Helen Francis Burhorn	Omaha			Piano, Warsaw Concerto			
1951	Geraldine Marie Elseman	Omaha	19		Dramatic Monologue			
1950	Jinx Burrus	Crete			Baton Twirling			
1949	Vanita Mae Brown	Omaha						
1948	Betty Love Booth	Fremont		Miss Nebraska				Multiple Nebraska representatives Competed under local title at Miss America pageant
1948	Serena McKinney	Omaha		Miss Omaha				Multiple Nebraska representatives Competed under local title at Miss America pageant
1947	Madalyn Joyce King	Omaha		Miss Omaha	Tap Dance		Non-finalist Talent Award	Competed under local title at Miss America pageant
1946	Marjorie Ann Hanson	Omaha		Miss Omaha				Competed under local title at Miss America pageant
1945	No Nebraska representative at Miss America pageant							
1944	No Nebraska representative at Miss America pageant							
1943	No Nebraska representative at Miss America pageant							
1942	Claire Buglewicz				Vocal, "You Made Me Love You"			
1941	No Nebraska representative at Miss America pageant							
1940	No Nebraska representative at Miss America pageant							
1939	No Nebraska representative at Miss America pageant							
1938	Emmajane Newby	Humboldt						
1937	Ruth Lenore Jones	Nebraska City						Assumed the title after the original winner, Ruby Hart, was disqualified after getting married
1936	No Nebraska representative at Miss America pageant							
1935	No Nebraska representative at Miss America pageant							
1934	No national pageant was held							
1933	No Nebraska representative at Miss America pageant							
1932	No national pageants were held							
1931	No national pageants were held							
1930	No national pageants were held							
1929	No national pageants were held							
1928	No national pageants were held							
1927	No Nebraska representative at Miss America pageant							
1926	Anne Kathleen Foucar	Omaha		Miss Omaha				Competed under local title at Miss America pageant
1925	Myrtle Roach	Omaha		Miss Omaha		Top 15		Competed under local title at Miss America pageant
1924	No Nebraska representative at Miss America pageant							
1923	No Nebraska representative at Miss America pageant							
1922	No Nebraska representative at Miss America pageant							
1921	No Nebraska representative at Miss America pageant							
