= Miss America 2010 =

83rd edition of the Miss America competition

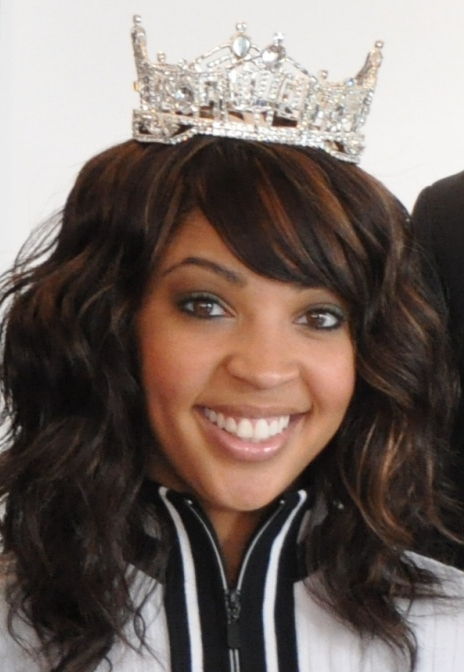
- Miss America 2010, Caressa Cameron, in 2010
- Date: January 30, 2010
- Presenters: Mario Lopez
- Venue: Theatre for the Performing Arts, Las Vegas, Nevada
- Broadcaster: TLC
- Entrants: 53
- Placements: 15
- Returns: Puerto Rico
- Winner: Caressa Cameron; Virginia

Miss America 2010, the 83rd Miss America pageant, was held on the Las Vegas Strip in Paradise, Nevada at the Theatre for the Performing Arts of Planet Hollywood Resort and Casino on Saturday, January 30, 2010. Miss America 2009, Katie Stam from Indiana, crowned her successor, Caressa Cameron from Virginia, at the end of the event.

Contestants from all 50 states along with District of Columbia, Virgin Islands and Puerto Rico competed for the prestigious title. The pageant was broadcast live on TLC. This edition was the 5th year that Las Vegas hosted the pageant.

Fifteen contestants were selected as finalists. After competing in swimsuit, the judges selected the top 12, and three are eliminated. After competing evening gown, ten were selected to compete in talent, and two are eliminated. Then, three are eliminated and seven were selected prior to the final interview. At the end of the competition, the four runners-up were announced first, followed by the new Miss America winner.

== Judges ==
The seven judges for the competition were:

- actress and producer, Vivica A. Fox
- Miss America 2002, Katie Harman
- Olympic gymnast, Shawn Johnson
- musician, Dave Koz
- radio personality, Rush Limbaugh
- comedian and actor, Paul Rodriguez

== Results ==
=== Placements ===
Placement	Contestant
Miss America 2010	Virginia – Caressa Cameron
1st Runner-Up	California – Kristy Cavinder
2nd Runner-Up	Tennessee – Stefanie Wittler
3rd Runner-Up	Louisiana – Katherine Putnam
4th Runner-Up	Kentucky – Mallory Ervin *
Top 7	Hawaii – Raeceen Woolford; New Mexico – Nicole Miner
Top 10	District of Columbia – Jen Corey; Nebraska – Brittany Jeffers; Texas – Kristen Blair
Top 12	Colorado – Katie Layman; Oklahoma – Taylor Treat*
Top 15	Arkansas – Sarah Slocum*; Indiana – Nicole Pollard; Oregon – CC Barber **

* - Selected by America's vote from the Miss America pre-pageant special, Miss America: Behind the Curtain. ** - For the first time in pageant history, after 14 finalists were selected, contestant was voted by her fellow competitors as the 15th finalist among the remaining 39 non-finalists.

=== Awards ===
==== Preliminary awards ====
Awards	Contestant
Lifestyle and Fitness	(New York (state)) New York - Alyse Zwick; Oregon - CC Barber; Puerto Rico - Miriam Pabón
Talent	California - Kristy Cavinder; Michigan - Nicole Blaszczyk; Virginia - Caressa Cameron

==== Quality of Life award ====
Results	Contestant	Platform
Winner	Oklahoma - Taylor Treat	Service Learning
1st runner-up	New Hampshire - Lindsey Graham	-
2nd runner-up	Nevada - Christina Keegan	-
Finalists	Alabama - Liz Cochran; Iowa - Anne Langguth; Kentucky - Mallory Ervin; Minnesota - Brooke Kilgarriff; Missouri - Tara Osseck; Montana - Brittany Wiser; Tennessee - Stefanie Wittler	Various

==== Other awards ====
Awards	Contestant
Miss Congeniality	Hawaii - Raeceen Woolford
Dr. & Mrs. David B. Allman Scholarship	Pennsylvania - Shannon Doyle
Non-finalist Talent	Iowa - Anne Langguth; Maine - Susie Stauble; Michigan - Nicole Blaszczyk; Minnesota - Brooke Kilgarriff; Rhode Island - Julianna Strout

musician, Brooke White

== Contestants ==
State/district/terr.	Name	Hometown	Age	Talent	Placement	Awards	Notes
Alabama	Liz Cochran	Helena	21	Contemporary Jazz Dance		Quality of Life Award Finalist	
Alaska	Sydnee Waggoner	Anchorage	23	Operatic Vocal			
Arizona	Savanna Troupe	Phoenix	23	Baton Twirling			
Arkansas	Sarah Slocum	Sheridan	23	Vocal	Top 15	America's Choice	
California	Kristy Cavinder	Orange	21	Ballet en Pointe	1st runner-up	Preliminary Talent Award	
Colorado	Katie Layman	Aurora	23	Contemporary Lyrical Dance	Top 12		
Connecticut	Sharalynn Kuziak	Southington	22	Theatrical Tap Dance			
Delaware	Heather Lehman	Magnolia	20	Classical Opera			
(Washington, D.C.) District of Columbia	Jen Corey	Washington, D.C.	22	Operatic Vocal	Top 10		Contestant at National Sweetheart 2008 pageant
Florida	Rachael Todd	Oviedo	22	Irish Step Dance			
(Georgia (U.S. state)) Georgia	Emily Cook	Marietta	22	Oboe			
Hawaii	Raeceen Woolford	Honolulu	24	Hula	Top 7	Miss Congeniality	
Idaho	Kara Jackson	Nampa	22	Viola			
Illinois	Erin O'Connor	Evergreen Park	20	Ballet en Pointe			
Indiana	Nicole Lynn Pollard	Lafayette	23	Broadway Vocal	Top 15		
Iowa	Anne Michael Langguth	Iowa City	22	Violin		Non-finalist Talent Award Quality of Life Finalist Award	Top 10 at National Sweetheart 2008 pageant
Kansas	Becki Ronen	Hutchinson	21	Classical Trumpet			
Kentucky	Mallory Ervin	Morganfield	24	Vocal	4th runner-up	America's Choice Quality of Life Award Finalist	Contestant on The Amazing Race 17, 18, and 24
Louisiana	Katherine Putnam	Shreveport	23	Piano	3rd runner-up	CMN Miracle Maker Award	
Maine	Susanna Stauble	Gray	22	Vocal		Non-finalist Talent Award	
Maryland	Brooke Poklemba	Westminster	24	Vocal			
Massachusetts	Amanda Kelly	Braintree	23	Vocal			Sister of Miss Massachusetts USA 2006, Tiffany Kelly Contestant at National Sweetheart 2008 pageant
Michigan	Nicole Blaszczyk	Novi	22	Lyrical Dance		Non-finalist Talent Award Preliminary Talent Award	
Minnesota	Brooke Kelly Kilgarriff	Eagan	20	Vocal		Non-finalist Talent Award Quality of Life Award Finalist	
Mississippi	Anna Tadlock	Brandon	23	Vocal			
Missouri	Tara Osseck	St. Charles	23	Tap Dance		Quality of Life Award Finalist	
Montana	Brittany Wiser	Bozeman	21	Vocal		Quality of Life Award Finalist	Later Miss Montana USA 2011
Nebraska	Brittany Jeffers	Ogallala	23	Broadway Style Jazz Dance	Top 10		Top 10 at National Sweetheart 2007 pageant
Nevada	Christina Keegan	Gardnerville	24	Contemporary Ballet en Pointe		Quality of Life Award 2nd runner-up	
New Hampshire	Lindsey Graham	Sandown	22	Vocal / Piano		Quality of Life Award 1st runner-up	
New Jersey	Ashley Shaffer	Perrineville	22	Classical Vocal			
New Mexico	Nicole Miner	Albuquerque	23	Vocal	Top 7		Contestant at National Sweetheart 2008 pageant
(New York (state)) New York	Alyse Zwick	Scarsdale	24	Ballet en Pointe		Preliminary Swimsuit Award	Contestant at National Sweetheart 2008 pageant
North Carolina	Katherine Elizabeth Southard	Matthews	23	Ballet en Pointe			
North Dakota	Katie Ralston	Carrington	22	Musical Theatre Vocal			
Ohio	Erica Gelhaus	St. Henry	21	Classical Vocal / Opera			Previously National Sweetheart 2007
Oklahoma	Taylor Treat	Ada	22	Ballet en Pointe	Top 12	America's Choice Quality of Life Award	
Oregon	CC Barber	Scappoose	23	Dance	Top 15	Contestants' Choice Preliminary Swimsuit Award	Contestant at National Sweetheart 2006 pageant
Pennsylvania	Shannon Doyle	Wilkes-Barre	24	Tap Dance		Dr. & Mrs. David B. Allman Scholarship	
Puerto Rico	Miriam Pabón	Las Piedras	24	Vocal		Preliminary Swimsuit Award	3rd runner-up at Miss World Puerto Rico 2008 pageant Top 12 at Miss International 2008 pageant
Rhode Island	Julianna Claire Strout	Watch Hill	24	Vocal		Non-finalist Talent Award	
South Carolina	Kelly Sloan	Gray Court	24	Vocal			
South Dakota	Morgan Peck	Sioux Falls	20	Vocal			
Tennessee	Stefanie Wittler	Soddy-Daisy	22	Vocal	2nd runner-up	Quality of Life Award Finalist	
Texas	Kristen Blair	Southlake	22	Classical Vocal	Top 10		
Utah	Whitney Merrifield	Lindon	19	Classical Piano			
Vermont	Laura Hall	South Burlington	22	Musical Theater Dance			
(United States Virgin Islands) Virgin Islands	Shayla Solomon	Saint Thomas	24	Steel Pan Drums			
Virginia	Caressa Cameron	Fredericksburg	22	Vocal	Miss America 2010	Preliminary Talent Award	4th runner-up at National Sweetheart 2006 pageant
(Washington (state)) Washington	Devanni Partridge	Auburn	21	Piano			
West Virginia	Talia Rochelle Markham	Ripley	22	Vocal			
Wisconsin	Kristina Smaby	Holmen	22	Dance en Pointe			
Wyoming	Anna Nelson	Rock Springs	19	Character Pointe Dance			
