= Destiny Vélez =

Puerto Rican beauty pageant titleholder

Destiny Velez
- Born: Destiny Vélez; November 19, 1995 (age 31); San Juan, Puerto Rico
- Education: Prairie View A&M University The University of Texas
- Height: 5 ft (1.5 m)
- Beauty pageant titleholder
- Title: Miss Fort Worth 2014; Miss Trujillo Alto 2015; Miss Puerto Rico 2015
- Hair color: Brown
- Eye color: Brown
- Major competition: Miss America 2016

Destiny Vélez (born November 19, 1995) is a beauty pageant titleholder from San Juan, Puerto Rico, who was crowned Miss Puerto Rico 2015. She competed for the Miss America 2016 title in September 2015 and placed outside the Top 15. On December 20, 2015, she was suspended indefinitely from her Miss Puerto Rico position after a series of Islamophobic comments via Twitter.

== Pageant career ==
=== Early pageants ===
As a child, Vélez started her pageant career at the age of 8, participating in National American Miss, Sunburst, Texas Choice Pageants, Cities of America and American Coed pageants. In 2005, she was named Miss Texas (North) Junior Pre-Teen. She vied for the 2005 National All-American Miss Junior Preteen title but she was not a Top 10 finalist. In 2009, she was named 2009 Miss Texas (North) Junior Teen, Division 1. She vied for the 2009 National American Miss Junior Teen title and placed 3rd runner-up for the national title.

Entering the Miss America system at 13, Vélez vied for the Miss Texas' Outstanding Teen title four times, placing well but never claiming the state title. In 2009, she was Miss Teen Tarrant County and placed second runner up. In 2010, as Miss Teen White Rock Lake, Vélez placed tenth overall but drew notice for her "crowd-pleasing performance" of "Wipe Out" on drums. In 2011, she was named Miss Teen Fort Worth 2011 and won eighth place at the state pageant. In 2012, Vélez entered the state pageant as Miss Hunt County's Outstanding Teen 2012 but was not a Top-10 finalist.

Competing as an adult, Vélez won the Miss Fort Worth 2014 title. She competed in the 2014 Miss Texas pageant with the platform "Bully-Free: It Starts With Me!" and an acoustic drum performance in the talent portion of the competition. She was not a Top 10 finalist for the state title.

=== Miss Puerto Rico 2015 ===
Returning to her native Puerto Rico to compete, Vélez was crowned Miss Trujillo Alto 2015. She entered the Miss Puerto Rico pageant in July 2015 as one of 15 qualifiers for the commonwealth title. Vélez's competition talent was an instrumental performance on acoustic drums. Her platform is "#UpStander" along with an anti-bullying campaign.

Vélez won the competition on July 11, 2015, when she received her crown from outgoing Miss Puerto Rico titleholder Yarelis Salgado. She earned several thousand dollars in scholarship money and other prizes from the commonwealth pageant. As Miss Puerto Rico, she is an ambassador and spokesperson for San Jorge Children's Foundation which is sponsored by Children's Miracle Network and The Bully Project, her platforms. Her activities include public appearances along with community service events across Puerto Rico.

=== Vying for Miss America 2016 ===
Vélez was Puerto Rico's representative at the Miss America 2016 pageant in Atlantic City, New Jersey, in September 2015. In the televised finale on September 13, 2015, she placed outside the Top 15 semi-finalists and was eliminated from competition. She was awarded a $3,000 scholarship prize as Puerto Rico's representative.

== Personal life and education ==
Vélez is a native of San Juan, Puerto Rico, but her family relocated to the Fort Worth, Texas, area when she was five years old. She is a 2014 graduate of L. D. Bell High School in Hurst, Texas. She was a championship bowler in high school with two perfect 300 games to her credit, her first at age 15. Vélez is a student at The University of Texas where she was a member of the Association of Latino Professionals for America, Women in Business, Sigma Alpha Lambda and Turning Point USA. She holds a bachelor's degree in Information Systems and a master's degree in Business Analytics. She also attended Prairie View A&M where she was part of the women's bowling roster from 2014 - 2016 and was the SWAC Champion. In her spare time she enjoys watching and volunteering in Esports and playing DOTA 2. She is involved with animal welfare issues and enjoys volunteering at her local animal shelter. From a former beauty queen now turned into streamer/gamer you can find her streaming on Twitch in her spare time.

== Response to controversial remarks ==
On December 17, 2015, Vélez posted a series of anti-Muslim and other comments on Twitter, as a response to filmmaker Michael Moore posting a photo of himself outside Trump Tower in New York holding a sign that said "We Are All Muslims". The tweets, which included: "there's no comparison between Jews, Christians & Muslims. Jews nor Christians have terrorizing agendas in their sacred books", and "Islamic God is not the same God as Christians & Jews" were posted via the official Miss Puerto Rico account. They were soon deleted and an apology was posted while the Miss America Organization distanced itself from the comments. On December 20, 2015, Vélez was suspended indefinitely from her Miss Puerto Rico role but after her apology, she was reinstated back with her title and did participate in the Miss America pageant. She crowned her successor Carole Rigual the following summer in 2016.

Awards and achievements
Preceded by Yarelis Salgado	Miss Puerto Rico; 2015	Succeeded by Carole Rigual
