= Miss America 1985 =

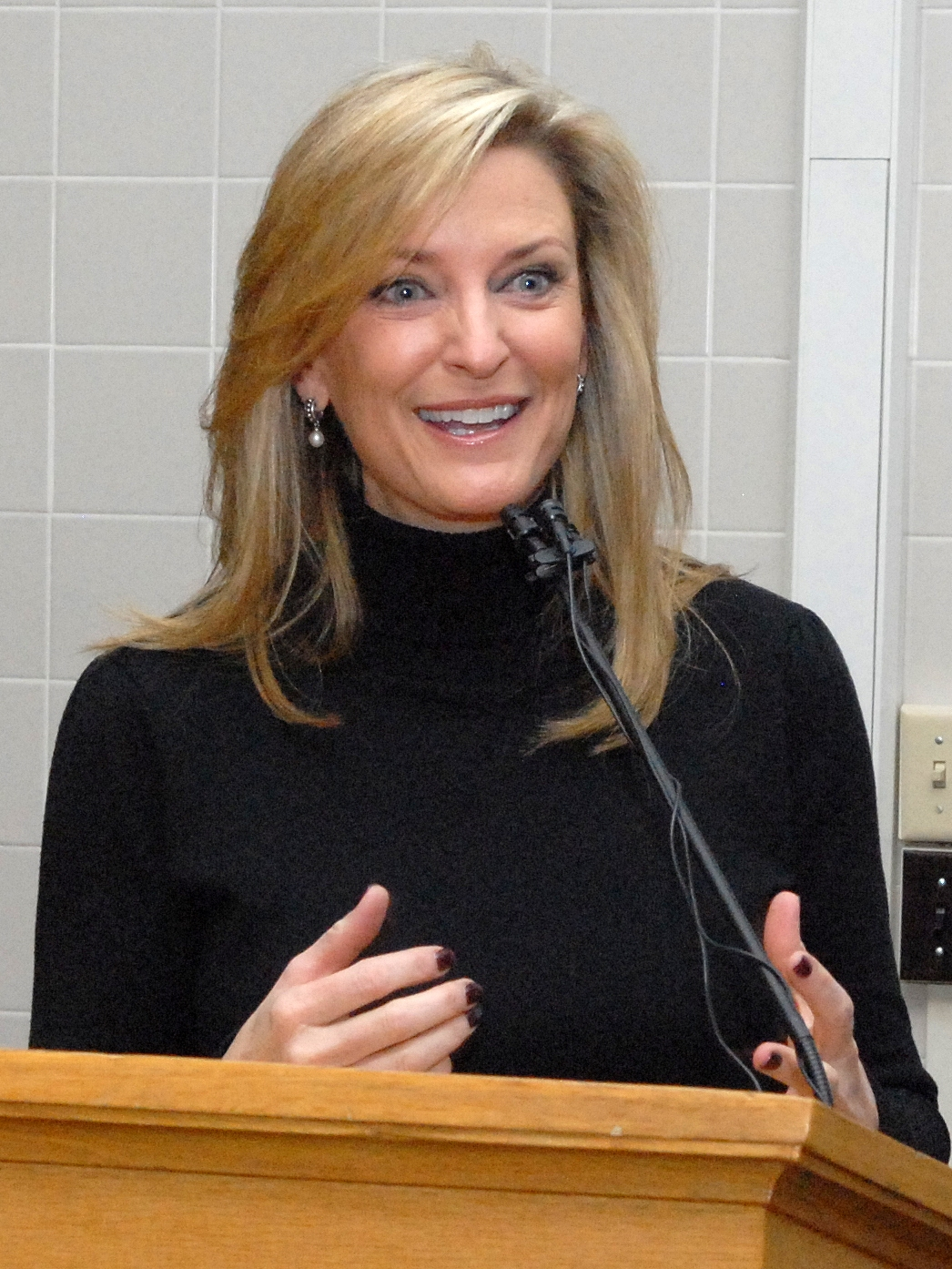
- Sharlene Wells Hawkes, Miss America 1985, in 2009
- Date: September 15, 1984
- Presenters: Gary Collins
- Venue: Boardwalk Hall, Atlantic City, New Jersey
- Broadcaster: NBC
- Winner: Sharlene Wells Hawkes; Utah

Miss America 1985, the 58th Miss America pageant, was broadcast from the Boardwalk Hall in Atlantic City, New Jersey, on September 15, 1984 on NBC Network.

The winner, Paraguay native Sharlene Wells Hawkes, became the first foreign-born Miss America. She later became a horse-racing and football commentator for ESPN from 1987 to 2002.

Another of the five finalists, Lauren Green, is currently a correspondent on the Fox News Channel.

== Results ==
=== Placements ===
Placement	Contestant
Miss America 1985	Utah – Sharlene Wells
1st Runner-Up	Ohio – Melissa Bradley
2nd Runner-Up	Mississippi – Kathy Manning
3rd Runner-Up	Minnesota – Lauren Green
4th Runner-Up	Texas – Tamara Hext
Top 10	Hawaii – Debbie Nakanelua; Kentucky – Kelly Lin Brumagen; Massachusetts – Margaret Marie O'Brien; New York – Mary Ann Farrell; Tennessee – Shelley Suzanne Mangrum

=== Awards ===
==== Preliminary awards ====
Awards	Contestant
Lifestyle and Fitness	Mississippi - Kathy Manning; Texas - Tamara Hext; Utah - Sharlene Wells
Talent	Massachusetts - Margaret Marie O'Brien; Minnesota - Lauren Green; (New York (state)) New York - Mary-Ann Farrell

==== Non-finalist awards ====
Awards	Contestant
Talent	Alabama - Tammy Little; Alaska - Maryline Blackburn; Arkansas - Lisa Stevens; (Georgia (U.S. state)) Georgia - Camille Bentley; Michigan - Barbara Crandall; Nebraska - Allison Boyd; New Jersey - Patricia La Terra; Virginia - Susan Parker

== Judges ==
- Pearl Bailey
- LeRoy Neiman
- Rebecca Ann King
- Vivian Blaine
- Christopher Little
- Dixie Ross Neill
- Josiah Bunting III
- Sam Haskell

== Contestants ==
State	Name	Hometown	Age	Talent	Placement	Special Awards	Notes
Alabama	Tammy Little	Section	23	Vocal, "Hit Me with a Hot Note" from Sophisticated Ladies		Non-finalist Talent Award	
Alaska	Maryline Blackburn	Anchorage	23	Vocal, "I Am What I Am"		Non-finalist Talent Award	
Arizona	Rhonda White	Central	20	Country Vocal Medley			
Arkansas	Lisa Stevens	Arkadelphia	22	Flute, "Sabre Dance"		Non-finalist Talent Award	
California	Donna Grace Cherry	Northridge	24	Singing Impressions			
Colorado	Lisa Frees	Thornton	25	Vocal, "I Got Rhythm"			
Connecticut	Joanne Caruso	Trumbull	23	Clarinet, "Jazz Medley"			Sister of Miss Connecticut 1980, Jeanne Caruso
Delaware	Nancy Lynn Ball	Rehoboth Beach	24	Jazz Ballet en Pointe			
(Washington, D.C.) District of Columbia	Desiree Keating	Silver Spring, MD	22	Interpretive Dance			Later Miss District of Columbia USA 1986
Florida	Lisa Valdez	Bradenton	21	Vocal, "Through the Eyes of Love"			
(Georgia (U.S. state)) Georgia	Camille Bentley	Thomasville	19	Popular Vocal, "Until Now"		Non-finalist Talent Award	
Hawaii	Debbie Nakanelua	Honolulu	26	Stylized Hula, "Hawaiian Hula Eyes"	Top 10		
Idaho	Patty Hoag	Burley	19	Popular Vocal, "Wind Beneath My Wings"			
Illinois	Ruth Booker	Chicago	21	Vocal, "Kiss Me in the Rain"			
Indiana	Cynthia Yantis	Fort Wayne	23	Popular Vocal, "City Lights"			
Iowa	Debra Deitering	Missouri Valley	23	Vocal, "This is My Life"			
Kansas	Nancy Lee Cobb	Wichita	20	Piano/Vocal, "I Love New Orleans Music"			
Kentucky	Kelly Lin Brumagen	Lexington	22	Vocal, "Le Jazz Hot!" from Victor/Victoria	Top 10	Dr. David B. Allman Medical Scholarship	
Louisiana	Nita Whitaker	Shreveport	24	Popular Vocal, "Over the Rainbow"			First African American to win Miss Louisiana
Maine	Lisa Johnson	South Portland	22	Electric Violin			
Maryland	Mary Elizabeth Haroth	Towson	25	Vocal, "Memory" from Cats			
Massachusetts	Margaret O'Brien	Weymouth	26	Vocal Medley, "The Man that Got Away", "The Man I Love", & "My Man"	Top 10	Preliminary Talent Award	Previously National Sweetheart 1983
Michigan	Barbara Jean Crandall	Lawrence	21	Ventriloquism, "Auctioneer's Song"		Non-finalist Talent Award	
Minnesota	Lauren Green	Minneapolis	26	Piano, "Étude Op. 10, No. 4 in C-Sharp Minor" by Frédéric Chopin	3rd runner-up	Preliminary Talent Award	First African American Miss Minnesota
Mississippi	Kathy Manning	Drew	22	Country Vocal, "Crazy"	2nd runner-up	Preliminary Lifestyle & Fitness Award	Later Miss Mississippi USA 1987 Top 11 at Miss USA 1987 Katharine Clare Manning Loeb died at 59 on December 23, 2021 of COVID-19 related illness in Tennessee.
Missouri	Anna Schell	Kennett	26	Semi-classical Vocal, Medley from The Sound of Music			
Montana	Michele Larson	Billings	21	Vocal, "My Tribute" by Andraé Crouch			
Nebraska	Allison Boyd	Nebraska City	21	Acrobatic Dance		Non-finalist Talent Award	
Nevada	LeAnna Grant	Las Vegas	22	Vocal, "I Love Paris"			Later Miss Nevada USA 1986
New Hampshire	Corinne Lucier	Hooksett	20	Vocal, "The Simple Joys of Maidenhood" from Camelot			
New Jersey	Patricia La Terra	West New York	24	Dramatic Monologue		Non-finalist Talent Award	
New Mexico	Trina Collins	Hobbs	22	Acrobatic Dance			Mother of Miss Indiana 2015, Morgan Jackson
(New York (state)) New York	Mary-Ann Farrell	New York City	22	Classical Piano, Danzas Argentinas	Top 10	Preliminary Talent Award	Sister of Miss Florida 1985, Monica Farrell Sister of Miss Illinois 1992, Kathleen Farrell
North Carolina	Francesca Adler	Fayetteville	23	Vocal, "Home"			Mother of Miss America's Outstanding Teen 2018, Jessica Baeder
North Dakota	Callie Northagen	Grand Forks	21	Piano			
Ohio	Melissa Ann Bradley	Mansfield	23	Vocal, "A Piece of Sky" from Yentl	1st runner-up		Mother of actor Chad Buchanan
Oklahoma	Julie Sunday	Owasso	21	Piano			
Oregon	Renee Bagley	Portland	22	Popular Vocal, "Don't Cry Out Loud"			
Pennsylvania	Gina Major	Huntsville	24	Vocal, Judy Garland Medley			
Rhode Island	Joanna Minisce	North Smithfield	19	Modern Jazz Dance			
South Carolina	Vicki Harrell	Columbia	22	Piano			
South Dakota	Debra Cleveland	Madison	19	Classical Piano			
Tennessee	Shelly Mangrum	Nashville	23	Vocal, "And the World Goes 'Round"	Top 10		
Texas	Tamara Hext	Fort Worth	21	Vocal, "I've Got a Crush on You"	4th runner-up	Preliminary Lifestyle & Fitness Award	
Utah	Sharlene Wells	Salt Lake City	20	Spanish Vocal & Paraguayan Harp, "Mis Noches Sin Ti"	Winner	Preliminary Lifestyle & Fitness Award	First foreign-born Miss America Currently on the Miss America Board of Directors
Vermont	Lorrie Glosick	Winooski	21	Vocal, "The Trolley Song"			
Virginia	Susan Carter Parker	Covington	23	Classical Vocal, "My Man's Gone Now"		Non-finalist Talent Award	
(Washington (state)) Washington	Rebecca Wood	Spokane	21	Vocal, "If I Ruled the World"			
West Virginia	Melanne Pennington	Cross Lanes	24	Semi-classical Vocal, "One Kiss" from The New Moon			Died from Leukemia at the age of 28 in 1988
Wisconsin	Barbara Marie Mullally	Onalaska	22	Vocal, "Here I Am"			
Wyoming	Annie Easterbrook	Laramie	21	Gymnastics Jazz Dance			
