= Miss America 1986 =

Annual competition open to American women

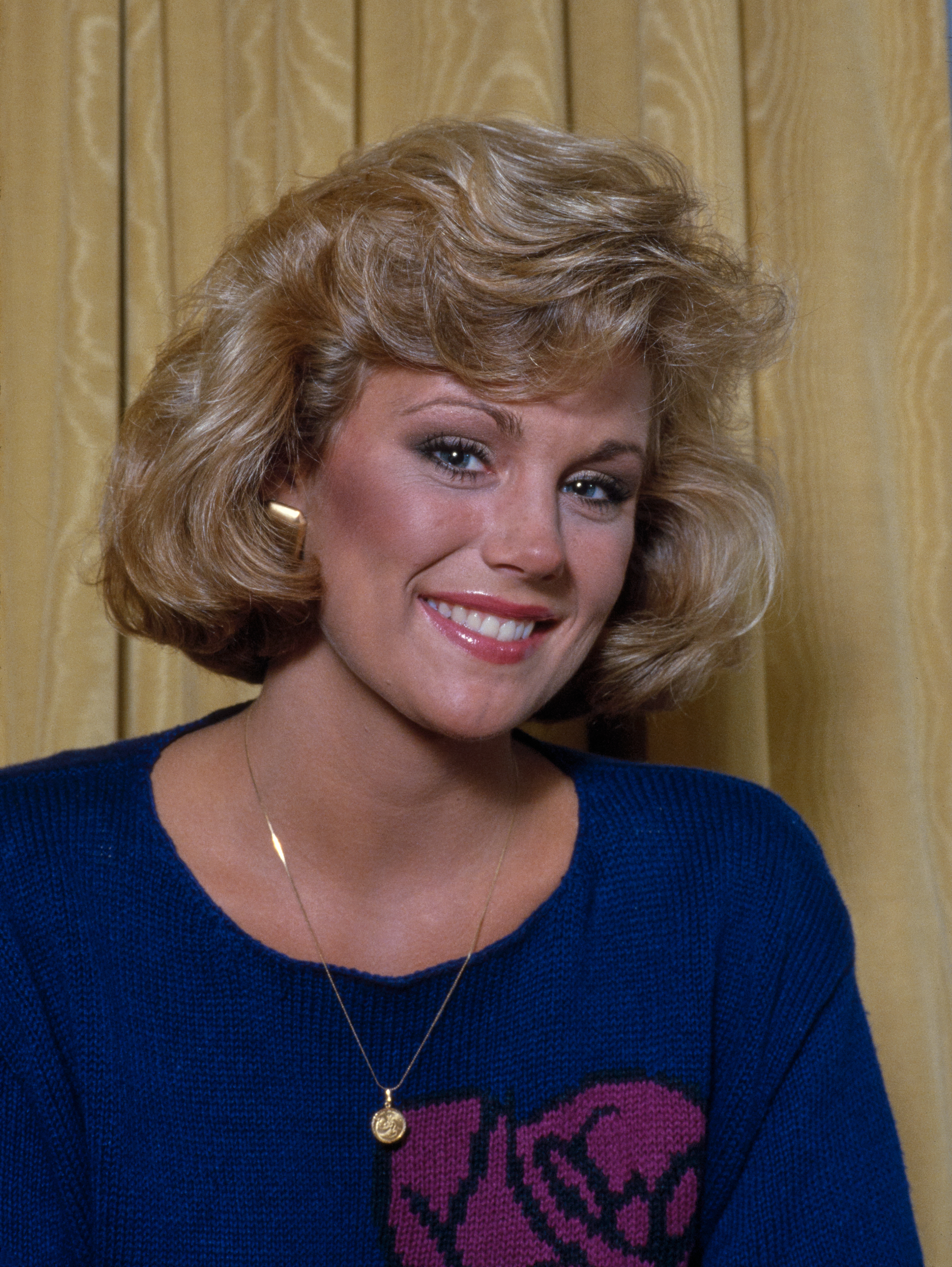
- Date: September 14, 1985
- Presenters: Gary Collins
- Venue: Boardwalk Hall, Atlantic City, New Jersey
- Broadcaster: NBC
- Winner: Susan Akin; Mississippi

Miss America 1986, the 59th Miss America pageant, took place at the Boardwalk Hall in Atlantic City, New Jersey on September 14, 1985 and was broadcast on NBC Network.

== Results ==
=== Placements ===
Placement	Contestant
Miss America 1986	Mississippi – Susan Akin
1st runner-up	South Carolina – Sherry Thrift
2nd runner-up	Texas – Jonna Fitzgerald
3rd runner-up	Washington – Honey Castro
4th runner-up	Alabama – Angela Tower
Top 10	Indiana – Laurie Broderick; Kentucky – Laurie Keller; Michigan – Alecia Masalkoski; New Mexico – Valerie Faber; Ohio – Suellen Cochran

=== Awards ===
==== Preliminary awards ====
Awards	Contestant
Lifestyle and Fitness	Alabama - Angela Tower; Ohio - Suellen Cochran; Mississippi - Susan Akin
Talent	Indiana - Laurie Broderick; Ohio - Suellen Cochran; Texas - Jonna Fitzgerald

==== Non-finalist awards ====
Awards	Contestant
Talent	Florida - Monica Farrell; Hawaii - Jeanne Miyamoto; Massachusetts - Lisa Kleypas; Nebraska - Julie Meusburger; Nevada - Sonja Nall; (New York (state)) New York - Jill Privateer; Pennsylvania - Lea Schiazza; Vermont - Erica Van Der Linde

== Delegates ==
State	Name	Hometown	Age	Talent	Placement	Special Awards	Notes
Alabama	Angela Tower	Birmingham	25	Ballet en Pointe, "Chariots of Fire"	4th runner-up	Preliminary Lifestyle & Fitness Award	Toured with the 1986 Miss America Gillette Show Troupe Mother of Miss Alabama's Outstanding Teen 2010, Scarlett Walker, and Miss Alabama's Outstanding Teen 2012 and Miss Alabama 2018, Callie Walker
Alaska	Kristina Christopher-Taylor	Palmer	20	Comedy Monologue			
Arizona	Diane Martin	Phoenix	23	Vocal, "The Man That Got Away" & "Maybe This Time" from Cabaret			Later Miss Arizona USA 1987 2nd runner-up at Miss USA 1987
Arkansas	Christi Taunton	Camden	20	Popular Vocal, "Remembering"		Dr. David B. Allman Medical Scholarship	
California	Lisa Davenport	Santa Cruz	23	Popular Vocal, "Once in my Lifetime"			Previously named Miss California 1982 when original winner, Debra Maffett, won Miss America 1983 Became the first titleholder to hold a state title twice
Colorado	Linda Trimmer	Denver	22	Vocal, "He Touched Me" from Drat! The Cat!			
Connecticut	Lorine Guagenti	Derby	21	Jazz Dance			
Delaware	Lisa Anne Patrick	Newark	24	Character Ballet en Pointe			
(Washington, D.C.) District of Columbia	Cherie Ward	Adelphi, MD	22	Original Drama			
Florida	Monica Farrell	Jacksonville	21	Classical Piano, "Prelude No. 5 in G Minor" by Sergei Rachmaninoff		Non-finalist Talent Award	Sister of Miss New York 1984, Mary-Ann Farrell and Miss Illinois 1992, Kathleen Farrell Later Miss Florida USA 1988 3rd runner-up at Miss USA 1988
(Georgia (U.S. state)) Georgia	Samantha Mohr	Columbus	23	Popular Vocal, "Wind Beneath My Wings"			
Hawaii	Jeanne Miyamoto	Honolulu	25	Vocal, "Bali Ha'i"		Non-finalist Talent Award	
Idaho	Nanette South	Rexburg	19	Alto Saxophone			
Illinois	Karen Moncrieff	Chicago	21	Popular Vocal, "Through the Eyes of Love" from Ice Castles			
Indiana	Laurie Broderick	Elkhart	21	Dance/Twirl	Top 10	Preliminary Talent Award	
Iowa	Sherri Bowman	Council Bluffs	24	Piano			
Kansas	Carolyn Jo Kirgis	Salina	25	Vocal, "Our Love Is Here to Stay"			Carolyn Jo Kirgis Johnson died in Phillipsburg, Kansas of complications with Multiple Sclerosis on July 24, 2022 at age 61.
Kentucky	Laurie Janine Keller	Nippa	21	Vocal/Ballet en Pointe, "Don't Cry For Me Argentina"	Top 10		
Louisiana	Carol Carter	Shreveport	20	Vocal, "Corner of the Sky" from Pippin			Later Miss Louisiana USA 1987
Maine	Mary Margaret Nightingale	Fort Fairfield	20	Vocal, "The Blue Danube"			
Maryland	Jennifer Louise Charlton	Bethesda	22	Vocal/Dance, "Last Blues Song"			
Massachusetts	Lisa Kleypas	Carlisle	20	Original Vocal Composition & Guitar, "Love You Are My Wings"		Non-finalist Talent Award	
Michigan	Alecia Rae Masalkoski	Muskegon	23	Karate Kata	Top 10		Holds a black belt in karate Later Miss Indiana USA 1987
Minnesota	Elizabeth Hunter	Austin	21	Semi-classical Vocal, "Love Is Where You Find It"			
Mississippi	Susan Akin	Meridian	21	Vocal, "You're My World"	Winner	Preliminary Lifestyle & Fitness Award	
Missouri	Lisa Coverdale	Columbia	24	Classical Piano			
Montana	Julie Culbertson	Billings	19	Jazz Dance			
Nebraska	Julie Meusburger	Lincoln	22	Flute, Carmen Fantasy		Non-finalist Talent Award	
Nevada	Sonja Nall	Las Vegas	23	Classical Ballet en Pointe, "Kitri's Variation" from Don Quixote		Non-finalist Talent Award	
New Hampshire	Tami Jean Brisebois	Deerfield	24	Modern Dance			
New Jersey	Toni Georgiana	Cherry Hill	21	Acrobatic Dance, "Slaughter on Tenth Avenue"			
New Mexico	Valerie Faber	Hobbs	26	Classical Piano, "Polonaise in A-flat major, Op. 53"	Top 10		
(New York (state)) New York	Jill Privateer	Fredonia	21	Vocal, "Shine On, Harvest Moon"		Non-finalist Talent Award	
North Carolina	Joni Parker	Fayetteville	24	Vocal, "The Shadow of Your Smile"			
North Dakota	Elizabeth Anne Jaeger	Fargo	25	Jazz Dance			Previously Miss North Dakota USA 1983 4th runner-up at Miss USA 1983
Ohio	Suellen Cochran	Heath	21	Piano, "Variations on Chopsticks"	Top 10	Preliminary Lifestyle & Fitness Award Preliminary Talent Award	
Oklahoma	Felicia Ferguson	Oklahoma City	24	Vocal, "You Don't Know Me"			
Oregon	Dana Kocks	Ashland	21	Classical Vocal, "Seguidilla" from Carmen			
Pennsylvania	Lea Schiazza	Philadelphia	23	Vocal, "Who's Sorry Now'		Non-finalist Talent Award	
Rhode Island	Lori Boucher	Pawtucket	20	Vocal, "Losing My Mind"			
South Carolina	Sherry Thrift	Westminster	23	Clogging, "Are You From Dixie?"	1st runner-up		Previously South Carolina's Junior Miss 1980
South Dakota	Amy DeHeer	Hot Springs	21	Vocal, "Who Will Buy?" from Oliver!			
Tennessee	Sonya Pleasant	Mountain City	22	Vocal, "I Fall to Pieces"			
Texas	Jonna Fitzgerald	Tyler	21	Fiddle, "Csárdás" & "Orange Blossom Special"	2nd runner-up	Preliminary Talent Award	
Utah	Gina Larsen	Provo	21	Popular Vocal, "Greatest Love of All"			
Vermont	Erica Van Der Linde	Old Bennington	21	Classical Piano, "Waldesrauschen"		Non-finalist Talent Award	
Virginia	Kimberly Johnson	Coeburn	19	Vocal & Piano, "Swing Low, Sweet Chariot"			
(Washington (state)) Washington	Honey Castro	Moses Lake	19	Vocal, "What Did I Have I Don't Have Now" from On a Clear Day You Can See Forever	3rd runner-up	Dr. David B. Allman Medical Scholarship	
West Virginia	Rebecca Porterfield	Martinsburg	21	Jazz Dance, "Dance Attack"			
Wisconsin	Mary Kay Anderson	St. Francis	20	Piano, "Frederik Chopin's Etude, Winter Wind, Op 25, No 11"			Later Miss Wisconsin-USA 1988
Wyoming	Tamra Jo Dereemer	Horse Creek	22	Popular Vocal, "God Bless the USA"			

== Judges ==
- Marian McKnight
- Chris Schenkel
- Jerome Hines
- Georgia Gibbs
- Gilbert Mitchell
- John Zerbe
- Cicely Tyson
