= Through the Fire =

Through the Fire may refer to:

== Music ==
- Through the Fire (Hagar Schon Aaronson Shrieve album), 1984
- Through the Fire (Peabo Bryson album), 1994
- "Through the Fire" (song), a 1985 song by Chaka Khan
- "Through the Fire", a 2022 song by Fivio Foreign featuring Quavo from the album B.I.B.L.E.

== Film ==
- Through the Fire (1988 film), a supernatural horror film, also released as Gates of Hell II: Dead Awakening
- Through the Fire (2018 film), a French film
- Through the Fire (2005 film), an American film

== See also ==
- "Through the Fire and Flames", a 2005 DragonForce song
- Through Fire, an American hard rock band
- Through the Wire, a 2003 single by Kanye West
