= Sanderford =

Sanderford is a surname. Notable people with the surname include:

- Howard Sanderford (1935–2026), American politician
- Paul Sanderford (born 1949), American college basketball coach
- Shannon Sanderford (born 1992), American beauty pageant titleholder
