= Samantha Mohr =

American television meteorologist (born 1961)

- Born: Samantha Sue Mohr; September 13, 1961 (age 65)
- Education: University of Georgia; University of St. Thomas
- Beauty pageant titleholder
- Title: Miss Columbus 1985; Miss Georgia 1985
- Major competition: Miss America 1986
- Website: http://samanthamohr.net

Samantha Mohr (born September 13, 1961) is an American meteorologist and television personality from Columbus, Georgia. Mohr was crowned Miss Georgia 1985 and competed for the Miss America 1986 title. She is currently on-air talent at The Weather Channel.

== Broadcast career ==
After being crowned Miss Georgia in 1985, Mohr used her scholarship winnings to study meteorology in Houston where she interned at FOX TV station KRIV. From there she went on to KTVK/Phoenix in 1989, where she was a morning meteorologist for Good Morning Arizona. After a dozen years in the desert, San Francisco's CBS O&O KPIX hired her as Chief Meteorologist, where she served from 2001 through 2007.

From the Bay Area, she returned to Georgia to The Weather Channel in 2007 on Weekend View, which she co-hosted with Dao Vu and Bill Keneely. CNN International was her next stop. During her two years at CNN Center from 2013 through 2015, she also provided weather coverage for Weekend Express on HLN. From there, Mohr did weekend weather for "WXIA-TV/11 Alive" in Atlanta as part of the "11 Alive StormTracker" team from 2015 - 2022.

== Pageant career ==
Entering her first pageant at the suggestion of a fellow UGA student, Mohr won the Miss Columbus 1985 title. This win made her eligible to enter the Miss Georgia pageant in June 1985. Mohr won the competition on Saturday, June 22, 1985. She earned more than $3,500 in scholarship money and other prizes from the state pageant.

As Miss Georgia, her activities included public appearances across the state of Georgia. Mohr was Georgia's representative at the Miss America 1986 pageant in Atlantic City, New Jersey, in September 1985. In computer modeling that successfully predicted that Susan Akin would be named Miss America, Mohr's odds were set at 22 to 1. Mohr was not a Top-10 finalist for the national crown. Mohr's reign as Miss Georgia lasted until she crowned her successor, Marlesa Ball, as Miss Georgia 1986 on June 28, 1986.

== Personal life and education ==
Mohr is a native of Columbus, Georgia, and a 1985 graduate of the University of Georgia. There she earned a bachelor of science degree in speech pathology with a minor in audiology. She is a 1989 graduate of the University of St. Thomas in Houston, Texas, where she earned a bachelor of arts degree in broadcast meteorology.

She is currently a meteorologist at The Weather Channel in Atlanta, Georgia.

Awards and achievements
Preceded by Camille Bentley	Miss Georgia; 1985	Succeeded by Marlesa Ball
