= Ashley Schmider =

American beauty pageant winner

- Born: Ashley Marie Schmider; 1991 (age 34–35); South Fayette, Pennsylvania
- Education: Duquesne University
- Height: 5 ft 3 in (160 cm)
- Beauty pageant titleholder
- Title: Miss Southwestern Pennsylvania 2012; Miss Laurel Highlands 2013; Miss Neshaminy Valley 2015; Miss Pennsylvania 2015
- Hair color: Brown
- Eye color: Hazel
- Major competition: Miss America 2016
- Website: "ashleyschmider.com". Archived from the original on 2015-08-01.

Ashley Marie Schmider is an American beauty pageant titleholder from South Fayette, Pennsylvania, who was crowned Miss Pennsylvania 2015. She then competed for the Miss America 2016 title in September 2015.

== Early life and education ==
Schmider is a native of South Fayette Township, a suburb of Pittsburgh, Pennsylvania. She is a 2009 graduate of South Fayette High School. As a high school senior, Schmider was presented with the Joan of Arc Medallion by the Roman Catholic Diocese of Pittsburgh in recognition of her volunteer work.

Schmider is a graduate of Duquesne University. Although she pledged the Sigma Kappa sorority, she is no longer a member. She is currently an associate risk consultant at KPMG in Philadelphia, Pennsylvania.

== Pageant career ==
In 2009, Schmider won the Queen title as well as the academic achievement and most promising model awards at the Miss Pennsylvania Teen pageant hosted by National American Miss. In March 2010, Schmider won the Miss Teen Pennsylvania-World 2010 title.

Entering the Miss America system of pageants, Schmider won the Miss Southwestern Pennsylvania 2012 title in November 2011 then competed in the 2012 Miss Pennsylvania pageant. She was named was first runner-up to winner Jordyn Colao. On November 3, 2012, Schmider won the Miss Laurel Highlands 2013 title then competed in the 2013 Miss Pennsylvania pageant. She was named was first runner-up to winner Annie Rosellini.

Schmider did not compete for Miss Pennsylvania in 2014. In July 2014, Schmider won the Miss United States Continental pageant in Houston, Texas.

Returning to the Miss America system, Schmider was crowned Miss Neshaminy Valley 2015 which made her eligible to compete at the 2015 Miss Pennsylvania pageant. Entering the state pageant in June 2015 as one of 40 finalists, Schmider's preliminary competition talent was a tap dance to "Pon de Replay" by Rihanna. Her platform is "Strong Women, Strong Girls: Impacting Our Communities... One Girl At A Time". Schmider won the competition on Saturday, June 13, 2015, when she received her crown from outgoing Miss Pennsylvania titleholder Amanda Smith.

As Miss Pennsylvania, her activities include public appearances across the state. Schmider was Pennsylvania's representative at the Miss America 2016 pageant in Atlantic City, New Jersey, in September 2015.

Awards and achievements
Preceded by Amanda Smith	Miss Pennsylvania; 2015	Succeeded by Samantha Lambert
