= Shirley Cothran =

American model

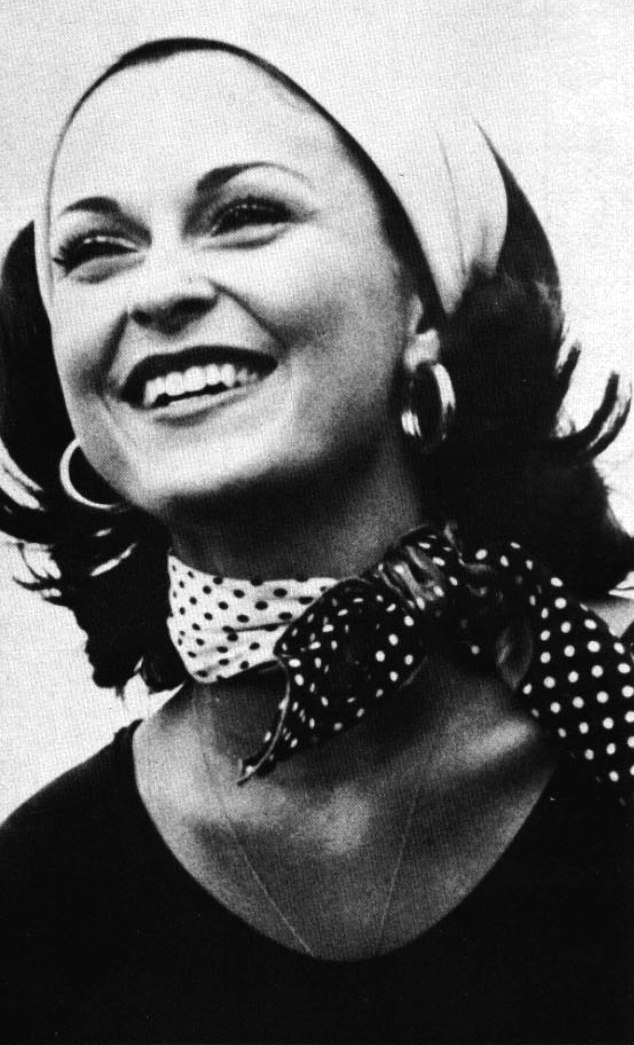
- Born: September 18, 1952 (age 73); Denton County, Texas, U.S.
- Education: North Texas State University; Texas Woman’s University
- Occupations: Author and professional speaker
- Title: Miss Texas 1974; Miss America 1975
- Predecessor: Rebecca Ann King
- Successor: Tawny Godin
- Spouse: Richard Barret (m. 1976)
- Children: 4
- Website: Official website

Shirley Cothran Barret (born September 18, 1952, Denton County, Texas) is an American beauty pageant titleholder from Texas, winning Miss America 1975.

== Early life and education ==
She graduated from Denton High School in 1970 and was the second Miss America from that high school as Phyllis George was crowned Miss America before her in 1971. She later attended North Texas State University and earned her bachelor of science in elementary education and her master's degree in guidance counseling.

Cothran later used the scholarship money she earned from her Miss America win towards her Ph.D. in early childhood education and family counseling.

== Life and career ==
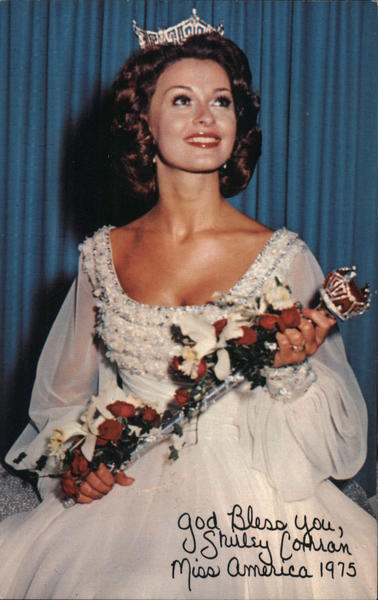
Postcard of Cothran as Miss America 1975

She was crowned Miss Texas 1974 and won the Miss America 1975 title. She currently tours as a motivational speaker and still resides in Texas.

She appeared, with her husband and three sons, on the television game show Family Feud in the season 19 episodes 62 and 64.

== Personal life ==
Cothran married Richard Barret in 1976 and has four children: David, Julia, John, and Mark. Her daughter Julia is the oldest of her children.

Though not maintaining as nearly as high of a public profile as fellow Texas-origin Miss America winner Phyllis George, Cothran did resonate with some younger women in the 1970s, described by The New York Times, along with George, in 1978 as a symbol "to younger Women of Texas tenacity and grace under pressure." However, Cothran made clear that she wished to raise her children “as much of a Texan as anyone.”

She was openly supportive of the Equal Rights Amendment and spoke in favor of abortions which were related to rape or danger to a mother's life.

Awards and achievements
Preceded by Rebecca Ann King	Miss America; 1975	Succeeded by Tawny Godin
Preceded by Judy Mallett	Miss Texas; 1974	Succeeded by Phyllis Barger
