= Jonna Fitzgerald =

American beauty pageant contestant

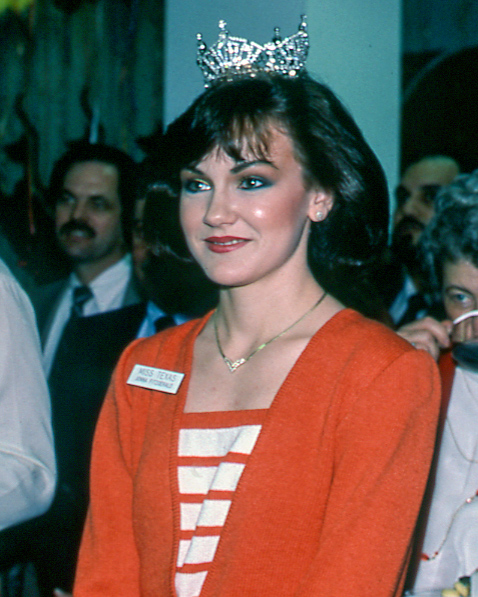
Miss Texas Jonna Fitzgerald at Houston Hobby Airport on December 10, 1985.

Jonna Fitzgerald is an American beauty pageant titleholder and musical entertainer. She was crowned Miss Texas 1985 then Preliminary Talent Winner and 2nd Runner Up to Miss America 1986. In computer modelling that successfully predicted that Susan Akin would be named Miss America, Fitzgerald's odds were set at 22 to 1.

Fitzgerald was a featured entertainer for the 1985 Vice-Presidential Inaugural Ball in Washington, D.C., with Johnnie High's Country Music Revue. Through the years she has shared the stage with artists such as Janie Fricke, Jerry Clower, Frenchie Burke, Mason Dixon, Larry Gatlin, Shoji Tabuchi, Johnnie Gimble, and Charlie Daniels. The country music Revue Association named her “Instrumentalist of the Year” in 1989.

In 1999, Fitzgerald became a news anchor at KETK-TV in Tyler, Texas. She worked as an anchor and community relations director until 2005, when she was named district director for incoming congressman Louie Gohmert's district office.

Awards and achievements
Preceded by Tamara Hext	Miss Texas; 1985	Succeeded by Stephany Samone
