= Miss America 2016 =

89th edition of the Miss America competition

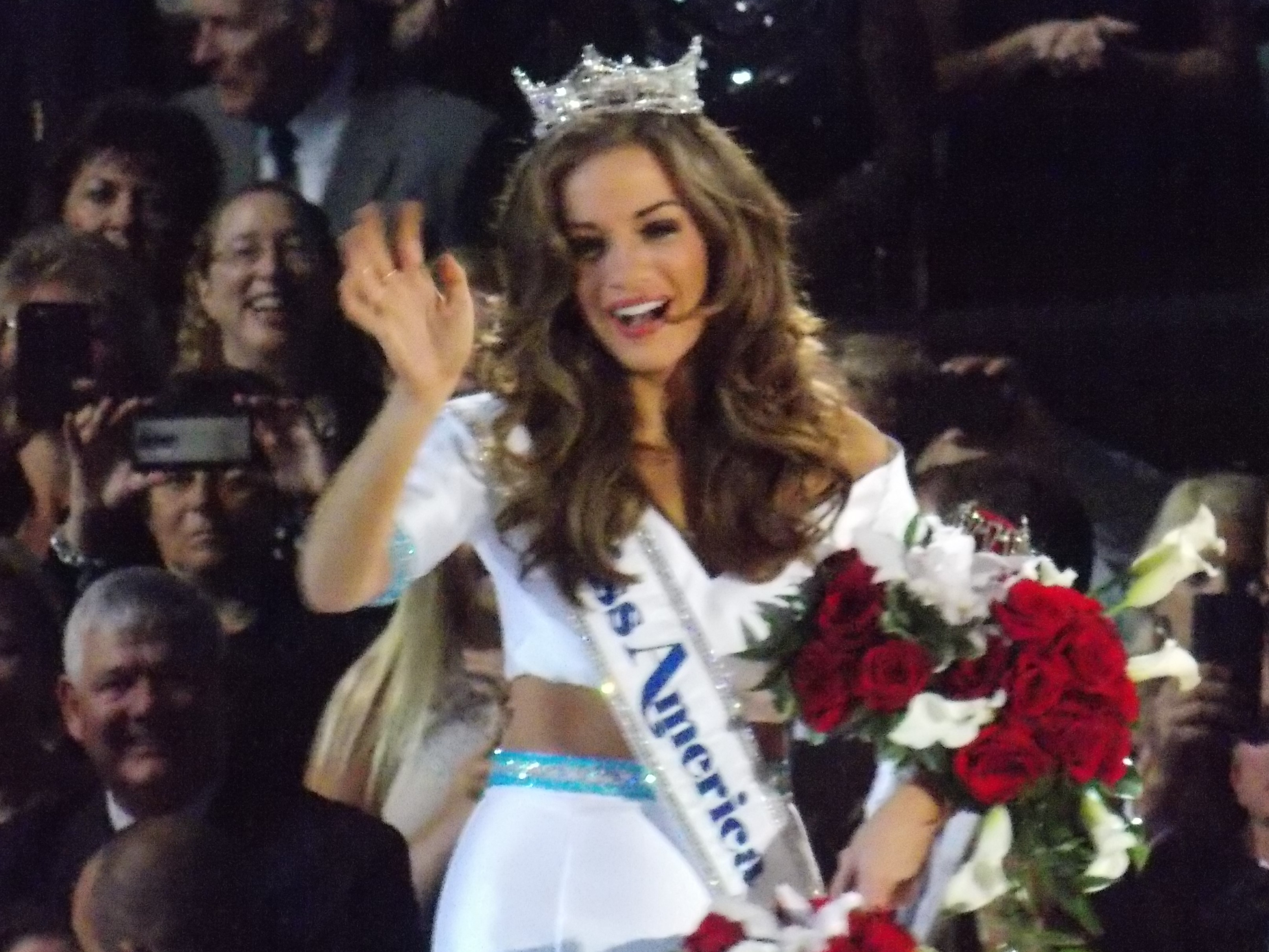
- Betty Cantrell as she walked the runway after being crowned Miss America 2016
- Date: September 13, 2015
- Presenters: Chris Harrison, Brooke Burke
- Venue: Boardwalk Hall, Atlantic City, New Jersey, United States
- Broadcaster: ABC
- Entrants: 52
- Placements: 15
- Withdrawals: Virgin Islands
- Winner: Betty Cantrell; Georgia

Miss America 2016 was the 89th Miss America pageant, held at the Boardwalk Hall in Atlantic City, New Jersey, on September 13, 2015.

Kira Kazantsev of New York crowned Betty Cantrell of Georgia as her successor at the end of the event. According to Miss America's website, the pageant got around 7.9 million views.

== Overview ==
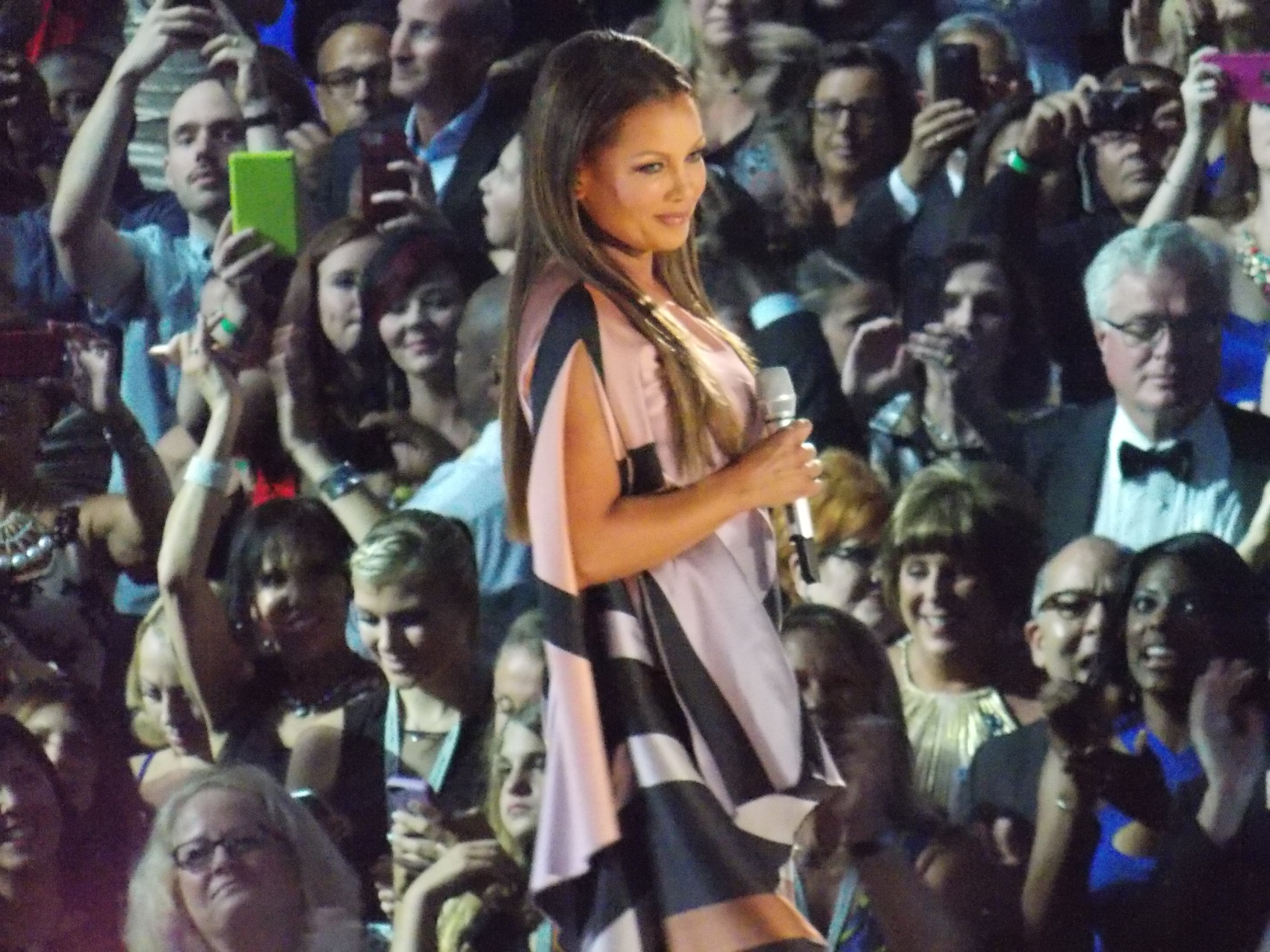
Vanessa Williams at the conclusion of her performance of "Oh How the Years Go By" at Miss America 2016

There were 52 women competing for the title, down from 53 contestants in the 2014 pageant, as the Miss Virgin Islands pageant organization did not renew their license and is no longer sending representatives for the Miss America pageant.

The panel of preliminary competition judges included publicist and talent producer Brian Edwards, Miss America 1979 Kylene Barker, producer Jenni Pulos, fashion and style expert Rachel Zalis, fashion designer Noah Alexander, D.C. lobbyist Lanny Griffith, and actor/model James Brown III.

Vanessa Williams (who was crowned Miss America 1984 but was forced to resign a few weeks before her reign ended) served as head judge and performed Oh How the Years Go By. The pageant began with Miss America CEO Sam Haskell issuing an apology to Williams, telling her that although "none of us currently in the organization were involved then, on behalf of today's organization, I want to apologize to you and to your mother, Miss Helen Williams. I want to apologize for anything that was said or done that made you feel any less the Miss America you are and the Miss America you always will be." Suzette Charles (Williams' replacement) said in an interview with Inside Edition that she was perplexed over the apology and suggested that it was given for the purpose of ratings. Williams also commented on the events surrounding her return, stating in an interview with Robin Roberts that "there's a lot of people who feel I should return, so the people who harbor the resentment I understand it but realize that all of those people that were part of the old guard are no longer there."

== Results ==
=== Placements ===
Placement	Contestant
Miss America 2016	Georgia – Betty Cantrell
1st Runner-Up	Mississippi – Hannah Roberts
2nd Runner-Up	Colorado – Kelley Johnson
3rd Runner-Up	Louisiana – April Nelson
4th Runner-Up	Alabama – Meg McGuffin
Top 7	South Carolina – Daja Dial; Tennessee – Hannah Robison *
Top 10	Florida – Mary Katherine Fechtel; Oklahoma – Georgia Frazier; Texas – Shannon Sanderford
Top 12	Iowa – Taylor Wiebers; Nebraska – Alyssa Howell
Top 15	Arkansas – Loren McDaniel; Virginia – Savannah Lane; West Virginia – Chelsea Malone

- - America's Choice

=== Awards ===
==== Preliminary awards ====
Awards	Contestant
Lifestyle and Fitness	Florida - Mary Katherine Fechtel; Iowa - Taylor Wiebers; South Carolina - Daja Dial
Talent	(Georgia (U.S. state)) Georgia - Betty Cantrell; Iowa - Taylor Wiebers; Louisiana - April Nelson

== Contestants ==
State/district/terr.	Name	Hometown	Age	Talent	Platform	Placement	Special awards	Notes
Alabama	Meg McGuffin	Ozark	22	Jazz Ballet en Pointe "Enigma Variation" from The Matrix	"Healthy is the New Skinny - Promoting Positive Body Image"	4th runner-up	Quality of Life Award 2nd runner-up	Previously Miss Alabama's Outstanding Teen 2007
Alaska	Zoey Grenier	Anchorage	19	Vocal "Shy" from Once Upon a Mattress	"Instilling Responsibility in Youth through Athletics"			Contestant at National Sweetheart 2014
Arizona	Madison Esteves	Chandler	20	Contemporary Dance	"Empowering Individuals With Disabilities"			Previously Miss Arizona's Outstanding Teen 2012
Arkansas	Loren McDaniel	Van Buren	22	Vocal "Piece of Sky"	"Confidently You"	Top 15		
California	Bree Morse	Garden Grove	23	Tap Dance	"Alopecia Areata Advocacy (NAAF)"			
Colorado	Kelley Johnson	Windsor	22	Monologue	"The Health Initiative PLUS"	2nd runner-up	STEM Scholarship Award	Appeared on The Ellen DeGeneres Show to discuss her nursing monologue and received $10,000 from Shutterfly for nurse anesthetist school Later Miss California USA 2018
Connecticut	Colleen Ward	Wolcott	22	Irish Step Dance	"Promoting Childhood Literacy: Encouraging a Health Mind for a Healthy Life"			
Delaware	Brooke Mitchell	Selbyville	19	Baton twirling "Rhythm of the Night"	"Volunteerism - Turn Your Passion into Action"			Contestant at National Sweetheart 2014
District of Columbia	Haely Jardas	Fort Myers	24	Vocal "Blank Space" by Taylor Swift	"Mental Health Manners"			
Florida	Mary Katherine Fechtel	Leesburg	19	Lyrical Dance "Listen"	"A Safety Net - Protecting Our Youth from Online Predators"	Top 10	Preliminary Lifestyle & Fitness Award	Sister of Elizabeth Fechtel, Miss America's Outstanding Teen 2012 Previously Miss Florida's Outstanding Teen 2010
Georgia	Betty Cantrell	Warner Robins	21	Classical Vocal "Tu Tu Piccolo Iddio"	"Healthy Children, Strong America"	Miss America 2016	Preliminary Talent Award	
Hawaii	Jeanné Kapela	Kailua-Kona	20	Lyrical Dance "My Heart Will Go On" by Tioni Tam Sing	"Sex Trafficking: #ItEndsWithUs"		Miss Congeniality	Contestant at National Sweetheart 2014, but pulled out of the competition due to a family emergency
Idaho	Kalie Wright	Kimberly	23	Vocal	"United We Stand, Supporting Our US Military Heroes"			Previously National Sweetheart 2014 Later Miss Minnesota USA 2018
Illinois	Crystal Davis	Anna	22	Vocal "That's Life"	"Crystal Clear Driving - Eyes on the Road Ahead"			
Indiana	Morgan Jackson	Charlestown	21	Lyrical Ballet, "You Raise Me Up"	"Project Impact: If not you, then who?"			Daughter of Trina Collins, Miss New Mexico 1984 Previously Miss Indiana's Outstanding Teen 2007; Top 10 at Miss America's Outstanding Teen 2008 Contestant at National Sweetheart 2014
Iowa	Taylor Wiebers	Clinton	21	Vocal. "Don't Forget Me" from Smash	"St. Baldrick's Foundation - Shave. Serve. Share."	Top 12	Preliminary Lifestyle & Fitness Award Preliminary Talent Award	
Kansas	Hannah Wagner	Wichita	19	Ballet en Pointe Swan Lake	"The Bold Initiative: Stand Up, Stand Out, BE BOLD!"			
Kentucky	Clark Janell Davis	Lexington	18	Vocal "Summertime"	"Promoting Dyslexia Awareness"			Grew up with dyslexia
Louisiana	April Nelson	Mandeville	23	Vocal "Climb Ev'ry Mountain" from The Sound of Music	"I.O.U. - Improving Others through U!"	3rd runner-up	Preliminary Talent Award	Previously Miss Louisiana's Outstanding Teen 2008
Maine	Kelsey Earley	Lebanon	24	Clogging "Black Betty"	"The Superhero in You"		Quality of Life Award Finalist	Contestant at National Sweetheart 2012
Maryland	Destiny Clark	Gaithersburg	23	Guitar/Vocal	"Forging Your Own Destiny - Overcoming Adversity with Self-Discovery and Mentorship"		Quality of Life Award Finalist	4th runner-up at Miss Maryland USA 2015
Massachusetts	Meagan Fuller	Attleboro	22	Jazz Dance	"America's Promise Alliance"			Previously Massachusetts' Junior Miss 2010; Top 10 at America's Junior Miss 2010 Contestant at National Sweetheart 2013; 1st runner-up at National Sweetheart 2013 pageant
Michigan	Emily Kieliszewski	Alpena	23	Tap Dance "U Can't Touch This" by MC Hammer	"Adopting America's Children"			
Minnesota	Rachel Latuff	Minneapolis	24	Contemporary Ribbon Dance "Out of the Woods"	"The Heart of Learning: Providing What Our Classrooms Need"			Contestant at National Sweetheart 2014
Mississippi	Hannah Roberts	Mount Olive	21	Classical violin "Zapateado, No. 2, Opus 23"	"Pages of Love"	1st runner-up	STEM Scholarship Award Quality of Life Award Finalist	Previously Mississippi's Junior Miss 2011; 2nd runner-up to America's Junior Miss 2011
Missouri	McKensie Garber	Hale	22	Jazz Ballet en Pointe "P.Y.T."	"Character Plus - Inspiring Lives of Integrity Through Education"			Previously Miss Missouri's Outstanding Teen 2011
Montana	Danielle Wineman	Cut Bank	23	Piano "Pirates of the Caribbean"	"Acting on Compassion"			Sister of Alexis Wineman, Miss Montana 2012 Previously Montana's Junior Miss 2010
Nebraska	Alyssa Howell	Omaha	20	Piano "Northern Lights"	"Making Miracles Happen - One Miracle Bag at a Time"	Top 12		Previously Miss Virginia National Teen 2009
Nevada	Katherine Kelley	Madisonville, KY	23	Piano	"Every Day Counts: A Comprehensive Plan for Improving School Attendance"			
New Hampshire	Holly Blanchard	Derry	23	Baton Twirling "Show Me How You Burlesque" by Christina Aguilera	"Charity from the Heart: Giving Time to Make a Difference"			Contestant at National Sweetheart 2014
New Jersey	Lindsey Giannini	Hammonton	21	Latin Rhythm Dance "Fireball" by Pitbull	"Dangers of Distracted Driving"		Quality of Life Award Winner	
New Mexico	Marissa Livingston	Albuquerque	20	Jazz Dance "I'm Gonna Live 'Til I Die"	"For The Kids - Supporting Children's Miracle Network Hospitals through Dance Marathons"			Contestant at National Sweetheart 2014
New York	Jamie Lynn Macchia	Eltingville	23	Lyrical Dance "I Was Here" by Beyoncé	"Inspiring Action Against Pediatric Cancer"			1st runner-up at National Sweetheart 2014
North Carolina	Kate Peacock	Dunn	19	Tap Dance "Swing the Mood"	"Pediatric Eye Disease"			2nd runner-up at Miss North Carolina's Outstanding Teen 2012
North Dakota	Delanie Wiedrich	Hazen	19	Vocal "Someone Like You" by Adele	"Beyond the B Word: A New Stance on Bullying"			
Ohio	Sarah Hider	Wooster	24	Jazz Vocal "Almost Like Being in Love"	"Women Hold Up Half The Sky"			Previously Miss Ohio's Outstanding Teen 2008
Oklahoma	Georgia Frazier	Tulsa	23	Vocal "Happy Days Are Here Again"	"Warriors for Women"	Top 10		Previously Miss Oklahoma's Outstanding Teen 2009 Top 16 at National Sweetheart 2014
Oregon	Ali Wallace	Portland	21	Lyrical Dance "Latch" by Sam Smith	"Traumatic Brain Injury Education & Awareness"			Daughter of Tamara Fazzolari, Miss Oregon 1987
Pennsylvania	Ashley Schmider	South Fayette	23	Tap Dance "Pon de Replay" by Rihanna	"Strong Women, Strong Girls Mentoring Organization: Impacting Our Communities... One Girl at a Time"			Contestant at National Sweetheart 2012 Previously Miss United States Continental 2014
Puerto Rico	Destiny Vélez	Trujillo Alto	19	Acoustic Drums	"#Upstander"			
Rhode Island	Alexandra Curtis	West Warwick	23	Musical Theater "Poor Unfortunate Souls"	"Leading Ladies: Equipping Young Women With the Skills to Lead"		Quality of Life Award Finalist	Previously National All-American Miss Teen 2010-2011; Contestant at National Sweetheart 2014; Later 4th Runner-Up at Miss World America 2017
South Carolina	Daja Dial	Spartanburg	22	Vocal "I Believe"	"Type I & Type II Diabetes Mellitus"	Top 7	Preliminary Lifestyle & Fitness Award	
South Dakota	Autumn Simunek	Hot Springs	22	Vocal, "Hallelujah"	"5 Stars for Serving Those Who Served"			Previously Miss South Dakota's Outstanding Teen 2007 Contestant at National Sweetheart 2012
Tennessee	Hannah Robison	Paris	21	Piano "El Cumbanchero"	"Campaign Against Pain: Arthritis Awareness"	Top 7	America's Choice STEM Scholarship Award Quality of Life Award 1st runner-up	2nd runner-up at Miss Tennessee Teen USA 2012
Texas	Shannon Sanderford	Coppell	23	Pop Vocal	"She Matters: Gender Equality and Female Empowerment"	Top 10		
Utah	Krissia Beatty	St. George	22	Piano "All of Me"	"Live Well"			
Vermont	Alayna Westcom	Bakersfield	23	Scientific Experiment	"Success Through STEM: Science, Technology, Engineering, and Math"		STEM Scholarship Award	Contestant at National Sweetheart 2014
Virginia	Savannah Lane	Midlothian	19	Vocal "Don't Rain on My Parade" from Funny Girl	"Power of Performance"	Top 15		
Washington	Lizzi Jackson	Bellingham	21	Vocal	"Community Through Mentorship: Investing in Our Future"		STEM Scholarship Award	
West Virginia	Chelsea Malone	Wheeling	23	Vocal	"Break the Silence: Opening up the Conversation of Mental Health"	Top 15		
Wisconsin	Rosalie Smith	Waukesha	19	Lyrical Dance "Heaven" by Beyoncé	"Colin's Crusade: Breaking the Barriers of Addiction"			
Wyoming	Mikaela Shaw	Laramie	21	Violin	"Make Music Matter"			Contestant at National Sweetheart 2013 Later Miss Wyoming USA 2017

== Pageant notes ==
=== Withdraws ===
- Virgin Islands - Due to lack of sponsorships
