= DaNae Couch =

- Born: DaNae Elizabeth Couch; August 6, 1988 (age 38); Coppell, Texas
- Education: Baylor University; Texas Tech University
- Beauty pageant titleholder
- Title: Miss Dallas 2012; Miss Texas 2012
- Hair color: Brunette
- Eye color: Brown
- Major competition: Miss America 2013 (Top 10)

DaNae Elizabeth Couch (born August 6, 1988) is an American beauty pageant titleholder from Coppell, Texas who was named Miss Texas 2012.

== Biography ==
She won the title of Miss Texas on July 7, 2012, when she received her crown from outgoing titleholder Kendall Morris. Couch’s platform is “Hope for Family Recovery: Life Beyond Addiction” and she said she hoped to address drug education, addiction awareness, and recovery resources in schools. Her competition talent was a twirling routine to “You Can't Stop the Beat.” Couch graduated with a degree in English and a minor in Public Relations from Baylor University, where she was also a member of Kappa Alpha Theta. While attending Baylor, Couch was a baton twirler in the Baylor University Golden Wave Band. As of 2012 Couch was in her third year of attending law school at Texas Tech University and was planning to become an attorney specializing in litigation. Couch has also served as a summer intern for the Supreme Court of Texas.

Awards and achievements
Preceded by Kendall Morris	Miss Texas; 2012	Succeeded by Ivana Hall
