= Monique Evans (Miss Texas) =

American beauty pageant titleholder

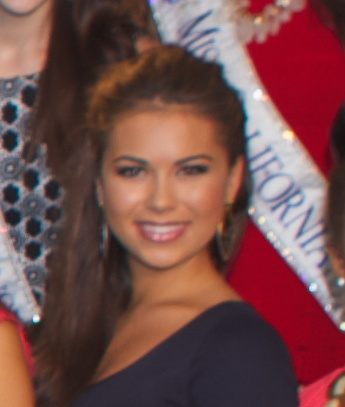
- Evans at Miss America 2015
- Born: Monique Elyse Evans; January 17, 1992 (age 34); Laguna Beach, California, U.S.
- Education: University of Texas at Austin
- Height: 5 ft 7 in (1.70 m)
- Beauty pageant titleholder
- Title: Miss Texas 2014; Miss Florida USA 2020
- Hair color: Brown
- Eye color: Brown
- Major competitions: Miss America 2015 (Top 16); Miss USA 2020 (Unplaced)

Monique Elyse Evans (born January 17, 1992) is an American dancer and beauty pageant titleholder who was crowned Miss Texas 2014 and Miss Florida USA 2020. She represented Texas at Miss America 2015 and placed in the top sixteen and also represented Florida at Miss USA 2020.

== Career ==
Evans won the Miss Austin 2011 crown, and placed 8th at the Miss Texas 2011 pageant. Evans was named Miss Hunt County 2012 on October 29, 2011, and placed 11th at Miss Texas 2012. Evans won the Miss Dallas 2013 title, but was a non-finalist for Miss Texas 2013. In July 2013, Gulfshore Life magazine named her one of three finalists in their "Model of the Year" contest for amateur models with ties to Southwest Florida.

In November 2013, Evans earned the title of Miss Park Cities, and the right to compete for the Miss Texas 2014 crown. Evans is a professionally trained ballerina, and her Miss Texas competition talent was performing ballet en pointe to "Requiem for a Tower". Evans won the Miss Texas 2014 title on July 5, 2014, when she received her crown from outgoing titleholder Ivana Hall at the Eisemann Center for Performing Arts in Richardson, Texas. Prizes for winning Miss Texas include a $10,000 cash scholarship, a wardrobe by fashion designer Vince Camuto, and use of an automobile from Grubbs Infiniti in Euless, Texas, while she holds the title.

As Miss Texas, Evans competed to be crowned Miss America 2015 at Boardwalk Hall in Atlantic City, New Jersey, on Sunday, September 14, 2014. Her platform, "Remember Your Heart: One Beat at a Time", focused on heart disease prevention and was inspired by cardiac issues in her immediate family. She placed in the Top 16 as a semi-finalist. During her year of service, Evans made a record-setting 470 appearances as Miss Texas.

In January 2020, she competed for and won Miss Florida USA 2020 title. She was crowned by outgoing titleholder Nicolette Jennings, and would represent the state of Florida at Miss USA 2020. In addition, she will serve as a goodwill ambassador for the organization.

Miss USA 2020 was originally scheduled for the spring of 2020, the competition was postponed due to the COVID-19 pandemic, and later held on November 9, 2020, but did not place.

In July 2021, Evans passed the title to Ashley Cariño of Kissimmee, becoming the longest state titleholder in the history, surpassing Linette De Los Santos due to COVID delays.

== Personal life ==
Evans is a 2010 graduate of Naples High School in Florida. As of 2017, she was living in Naples, Florida, working as a specialty pharma rep and ballet instructor. Her older brother was born with Shone's syndrome, a rare congenital heart disease.

Awards and achievements
Preceded by Ivana Hall	Miss Texas; 2014	Succeeded by Shannon Sanderford
Preceded by Nicolette Jennings	Miss Florida USA; 2020	Succeeded by Ashley Cariño
