= Miss America 1975 =

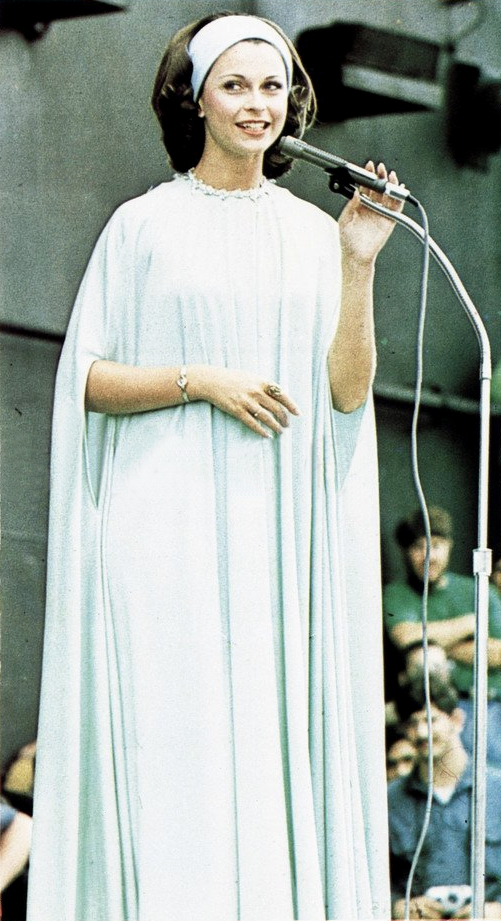
- Miss America 1975 aboard USS John F. Kennedy
- Date: September 7, 1974
- Presenters: Bert Parks; Phyllis George
- Venue: Boardwalk Hall, Atlantic City, New Jersey
- Broadcaster: NBC
- Winner: Shirley Cothran; Texas

Miss America 1975, the 48th Miss America pageant, was held at the Boardwalk Hall in Atlantic City, New Jersey on September 7, 1974, and broadcast on NBC.

The winner, Shirley Cothran, was a graduate of Denton High School in Texas, the same school attended by the Miss America of four years before, Phyllis George.

Among the other contestants in the 1975 pageant was Miss Florida, actress Delta Burke.

== Results ==
=== Placements ===
Placement	Contestant
Miss America 1975	Texas – Shirley Cothran
1st Runner-Up	California – Lucianne Buchanan
2nd Runner-Up	Illinois – Jean Ahern
3rd Runner-Up	Kentucky – Darlene Compton
4th Runner-Up	Louisiana – Libby Lovejoy
Top 10	Indiana – Penny Tichenor; New Mexico – Donna Reel; South Dakota – Barbara Marie Guthmiller; Tennessee – Deborah Humphreys Kincaid; Washington – Kathleen Beth Moore

=== Top 10 ===
1. Tennessee
2. Illinois
3. New Mexico
4. Kentucky
5. Texas
6. South Dakota
7. Louisiana
8. Indiana
9. California
10. Washington

=== Awards ===
==== Preliminary awards ====
Awards	Contestant
Lifestyle and Fitness	California - Lucianne Buchanan; Kansas - Karen Diane Smith; Texas - Shirley Cothran
Talent	Illinois - Jean Ahern; Kentucky - Darlene Compton; Tennessee - Deborah Humphreys Kincaid

=== Other awards ===
Awards	Contestant
Non-finalist Talent	Florida - Delta Burke; Iowa - Jean Bollhoefer; Kansas - Karen Diane Smith; North Carolina - Susan Lynn Griffin; Ohio - Lorrie Janet Kapsta; Rhode Island - Karen Ann Salvatore; West Virginia - Mary Beth Derry
Miss Congeniality	Arkansas - Rhonda Kay Pope; Hawaii - Coline-Helen Kanaloku Aiu

== Judges ==
- Eileen Farrell
- Dr. Wellington B. Gray
- Trudy Haynes
- Peter Lind Hayes
- Mary Healy
- Eddie Foy III
- Colonel Gilbert Mitchell
- Jeanne Meixell

== Contestants ==
State	Name	Hometown	Age	Talent	Placement	Special Awards	Notes
Alabama	Pam Long	Florence	20	Ventriloquism			Screenwriter of the soap opera Guiding Light
Alaska	Darby Moore	Kenai	20	Ventriloquism, "Supercalifragilisticexpialidocious"			
Arizona	Mary Avilla	Glendale	20	Popular Vocal, "Best Thing You've Ever Done"			
Arkansas	Rhonda Pope	Hot Springs	21	Vocal Medley, "Friends" & "With a Little Help from My Friends"		Miss Congeniality	
California	Lucianne Buchanan	Claremont	21	Harp, "Concerto in B Flat"	1st runner-up	Preliminary Lifestyle & Fitness Award	
Colorado	Cynthia Hunter	Denver	23	Soft Shoe Dance, "Mame"			
Connecticut	Elisa Heinemann	Wethersfield	18	Dramatic Interpretations, "Prunella", "Yenta", & "Wicked Witch"			
Delaware	Kathleen Attanasi	Rehoboth Beach	22	Harp Medley, "Harmonious Blacksmith" & "Close to You"			
Florida	Delta Burke	Orlando	18	Dramatic Monologue, "Anne Boleyn"		Non-finalist Talent Award	Later gained fame as an actress, most notable on Designing Women
(Georgia (U.S. state)) Georgia	Gail Nelson	Atlanta	22	Vocal Medley, "So Long, Dearie", "Put on Your Sunday Clothes", & "Before the Parade Passes By" from Hello, Dolly!			
Hawaii	Coline-Helen Kanaloku Aiu	Honolulu	23	Modern Jazz Dance, "Hospital Shootout"		Miss Congeniality	
Idaho	Rochelle Bacon	Boise	21	Vocal, "Cornet Man" from Funny Girl			
Illinois	Jean Ahern	Hinsdale	21	Ballet en Pointe, "Kitri's Variation" from Don Quixote	2nd runner-up	Preliminary Talent Award	
Indiana	Penny Tichenor	Owensville	21	Vocal, "Maybe This Time" from Caberet	Top 10		
Iowa	Jean Bollhoefer	Haverhill	25	Popular Vocal, "Starting Here, Starting Now"		Non-finalist Talent Award	
Kansas	Karen Smith	Shawnee	18	Jazz/Acrobatic Dance, "The Entertainer"		Non-finalist Talent Award Preliminary Lifestyle & Fitness Award	
Kentucky	Darlene Compton	Louisville	25	Vocal, "Mira" from Carnival!	3rd runner-up	Preliminary Talent Award	
Louisiana	Libby Lovejoy	Sulphur	21	Classical Ballet en Pointe, "The Grenadiers"	4th runner-up		
Maine	Margaret Ann Welch	Bangor	22	Vocal, "Killing Me Softly with His Song"			
Maryland	Susan Jane Wohlfarth	Potomac	21	Classical Ballet, Giselle			
Massachusetts	Susan Sadlier	Lowell	22	Musical Comedy, "I'm the Greatest Star"		Dr. David B. Allman Medical Scholarship	
Michigan	Susan Lillian Short	Kalamazoo	23	Semi-classical Vocal, "Love is Where You Find It"			
Minnesota	Pam Bernhagen	Bloomington	20	Acrobatic Jazz Ballet, "Fiddler on the Roof"			Sister of Miss Minnesota 1971, Sheila Bernhagen
Mississippi	Diane Bounds	Gulfport	21	Popular Vocal, "When You Smile"			
Missouri	Michelle Marshall	Florissant	20	Vocal/Dance, "Sweet Charity" from Sweet Charity			
Montana	Pamela Royer	Billings	20	Gymnastic Floor Exercise, "Love Story"			
Nebraska	Sharon Sue Pelc	Johnstown	22	Ventriloquism & Singing, "Those Were the Days"			
Nevada	Jacqueline Barker	Sparks	19	Popular Vocal, "The Way We Were"			
New Hampshire	Cynthia Erb	Manchester	18	Gymnastic Dance to the theme from Midnight Cowboy		Dr. David B. Allman Medical Scholarship	
New Jersey	Elizabeth Bracken	Mahwah	21	Dramatic Monologue, "Elizabeth Umpstead" by Carl Sandburg			
New Mexico	Donna Frances Reel	Albuquerque	21	Vocal, "For Once in My Life"	Top 10		Previously Miss New Mexico USA 1972 Top 10 at Miss USA 1972 Previously Miss New Mexico World 1973 Top 16 at Miss World USA 1973
(New York (state)) New York	Kris Krull	Niagara Falls	22	Jazz Dance, "Superstar" from Jesus Christ Superstar			
North Carolina	Susan Griffin	High Point	22	Semi-classical Vocal, "With a Song in My Heart"		Non-finalist Talent Award	Susan Griffin Fisher died at age 71 on January 27, 2024 in High Point, North Carolina.
North Dakota	Susan Kay Myhr	Bottineau	18	Vocal, "You're Gonna Hear From Me" & "Don't Rain on My Parade"			
Ohio	Lorrie Kapsta	Columbus	26	Classical Piano, "Piano Concerto in B Minor" by Tchaikovsky		Non-finalist Talent Award	
Oklahoma	Debbie Knight	Warr Acres	22	Piano, "Minuet in G Major"			
Oregon	Juli Ann Berg	Eugene	21	Vocal, "Corner of the Sky" from Pippin			Daughter of Miss Oregon 1947, Jo Ann Amorde
Pennsylvania	Karen Lynn Kuhn	Levittown	20	Ballet, "Shubert Alley Overture"			
Rhode Island	Karen Salvatore	Warwick	22	Original Skit, "Don't Smoke"		Non-finalist Talent Award	
South Carolina	Cheryl Von Lehe	Charleston	18	Vocal, "Oh Babe, What Would You Say?"			
South Dakota	Barbara Guthmiller	Tripp	21	Vocal, "Summertime"	Top 10		Older sister of Miss South Dakota 1976, Beth Guthmiller Contestant at National Sweetheart 1972
Tennessee	Deborah Kincaid	Memphis	21	Vocal Medley, "Once in a Lifetime", "In My Own Lifetime", & "This is My Life"	Top 10	Preliminary Talent Award	
Texas	Shirley Cothran	Denton	21	Flute Medley, "Bumble Boogie" & "Swingin' Sheperd Blues"	Winner	Preliminary Lifestyle & Fitness Award	
Utah	Kathlyn Louise White	Bountiful	21	Classical Vocal, "Voices of Spring"			Married singer Wayne Osmond
Vermont	Donna Shea	Windsor	21	Oratory, "Eulogy of John F. Kennedy"			
Virginia	Stephanie Dowdy	Virginia Beach	18	Vocal, "I've Gotta Be Me"			
(Washington (state)) Washington	Kathleen Moore	Bothell	22	Classical Vocal, "Italian Street Song"	Top 10		
West Virginia	Mary Derry	Morgantown	21	Semi-classical Vocal, "Cycles"		Non-finalist Talent Award	
Wisconsin	Carol Schmitt	Green Bay	22	Vocal, "Speak Softly Love"		Dr. David B. Allman Medical Scholarship Special Education Award	
Wyoming	Cheryl Johnson	Cheyenne	20	Modern Jazz Dance, "Scorpio"		Dr. David B. Allman Medical Scholarship	
