= Carol Carter =

Carol Carter may refer to:

- Carol A. Carter, American microbiologist
- Carol Ann Carter, American artist
