= Tamara Hext =

American beauty queen (born 1963)

Tamara Lynne Hilliard (née Hext; born May 1, 1963) is an American beauty queen from Texas who competed in the Miss America pageant.

== Career ==
Hext won the title Miss Texas 1984, after competing in that pageant as Miss Arlington. She went on to become a finalist in the nationally televised Miss America pageant that same year, and finished as the 4th runner up. Tamara attended Vidor High School.

After competing for the Miss America pageant, Hext relocated to New York City and began studying acting. She had a co-starring role in the 1988 horror film Through the Fire. She subsequently returned to Texas where she completed a degree at the University of Texas at Arlington.

== Personal life ==
Hext was married to Jim Hilliard, who played for the Texas Longhorns football team and was an orthopedic surgeon for 35 years. In March 2018, Jim Hilliard was diagnosed with amyotrophic lateral sclerosis. The couple raised three sons, the youngest of whom, Sam Hilliard, is a professional baseball player. Jim died on September 12, 2021.

Awards and achievements
Preceded by Gloria Gilbert	Miss Texas; 1984	Succeeded by Jonna Fitzgerald
