= Miss Texas' Teen =

American state beauty pageant

- Formation: 1990
- Type: Beauty pageant
- Headquarters: Richardson
- Location: Texas
- Members: Miss America's Teen
- Official language: English
- Key people: Jan Mitchell
- Website: Official website

The Miss Texas' Teen competition is the pageant that selects the representative for the U.S. state of Texas in the Miss America's Teen pageant.

In January 2023, the official name of the pageant was changed from Miss Texas' Outstanding Teen, to Miss Texas’ Teen, in accordance with the national pageant.

Zoe Zogleman of Prosper was crowned Miss Texas' Teen on June 27, 2026, at the Eisemann Center in Richardson, Texas. She competed for the title of Miss America's Teen 2027 on September 5, 2026, at the Kravis Center for the Performing Arts in West Palm Beach, Florida.

== Results summary ==
The results of Miss Texas' Teen as they participated in the national Miss America's Teen competition. The year in parentheses indicates the year of the Miss America's Teen competition the award/placement was garnered.

=== Placements ===
- Miss America's Teen: Meghan Miller (2006), London Hibbs (2019)
- 1st runners-up: Addyson Jackson (2016)
- 2nd runners-up: Katherine Omo-Osagie (2022), J-Belle Kimbrell (2023), Emma Fossum (2026), Zoe Zogleman (2027)
- 3rd runners-up: Reilly Johannson (2012), Stephanie Wendt (2018), Natalie Poveda (2024)
- 4th runners-up: Macie Krause (2025)
- Top 7: Kassidy Brown (2015), Heather King (2017)
- Top 8: Margana Wood (2013)
- Top 10: Sydney Capello (2009)
- Top 12: Sheridan Donevant (2014)

=== Awards ===
==== Preliminary awards ====
- Preliminary Fitness: Natalie Poveda (2024), Macie Krause (2025), Zoe Zogleman (2027)
- Preliminary Evening Gown: Natalie Poveda (2024)
- Preliminary Evening Wear/On Stage Question: Meghan Miller (2006), Kendall Morris (2007), Sydney Capello (2009), Stephanie Wendt (2018), London Hibbs (2019), Katherine Omo-Osagie (2022)
- Preliminary Lifestyle & Fitness: Kendall Morris (2007)
- Preliminary Talent: Meghan Miller (2006), Sydney Capello (2009), London Hibbs (2019), Macie Krause (2025), Emma Fossum (2026)

==== Non-finalist awards ====
- Non-finalist Talent: Allie Graves (2020)

==== Other awards ====
- Advertisement Sales Award: J-Belle Kimbrell (2023)
- America's Choice: Sheridan Donevant (2014)
- Overall Talent: Meghan Miller (2006)
- Overall Vocal Talent: Allie Graves (2020)
- Scholastic Excellence: Stephanie Wendt (2018)
- Spirit of America Award: Heather King (2017)
- Top Advertisement Sales Media Scholarship: Allie Graves (2020)
- Overall Interview Award: Katherine Omo-Osagie (2022)

== Winners ==
- Declared as Winner
- Ended as a runner-up
- Ended as a finalist or semi-finalist

Year	Name	Hometown	Age	Local title	Talent	Placement at MAO Teen	Special scholarships at MAO Teen	Notes
2026	Zoe Zogleman	Prosper	17	Miss Dallas' Teen	Acro Dance	2nd Runner-Up	Preliminary Fitness Award	
2025	Emma Fossum	Dallas	17	Miss Colleyville's Teen	Classical Piano "La Campanella" by Franz Liszt	2nd Runner-Up	Preliminary Talent Award	First Asian American to win Miss Texas’ Teen Later Miss Ohio Teen USA 2026 Top 20 at Miss Teen USA 2026
2024	Macie Krause	Dallas	17	Miss Arlington's Teen	Lyrical Dance, "I Didn't Know My Own Strength" by Whitney Houston	4th Runner-Up	Preliminary Talent Award Preliminary Fitness Award	Previously International Cinderella Teen (2022-2023) Previously International Cinderella Mini-Miss (2016-2017) Previously International Cinderella Tot (2014-2015)
2023	Natalie Poveda	Grapevine	18	Miss Colleyville's Teen	Dance	3rd Runner-Up	Preliminary Fitness Award Preliminary Evening Gown	
2022	J-Belle Kimbrell	Dallas	18	Miss Southlake's Outstanding Teen	Vocal	2nd Runner-Up	Advertisement Sales Award	
2021	Katherine Omo-Osagie	Carrollton	17	Miss Lewisville's Outstanding Teen	Vocal, "How Far I'll Go" from Moana	2nd Runner-Up	Preliminary Evening Wear/OSQ Award Overall Interview Award	2nd runner-up at Miss Texas 2025 and 2026
2019-20	Allie Graves	Texarkana	17	Miss Lone Star's Outstanding Teen	Vocal, "Tomorrow"		Non-finalist Talent Award Overall Vocal Talent Award Top Advertisement Sales Media Scholarship	
2018	Ady Lee Forrester	Midlothian	16	Miss Arlington's Outstanding Teen	Vocal	N/A		Assumed title when Hibbs was named Miss America's Outstanding Teen 2019
2018	London Hibbs	Tyler	17	Miss Dallas' Outstanding Teen	Vocal, "Think of Me" from The Phantom of the Opera	Winner	Preliminary Evening Wear/OSQ Award Preliminary Talent Award	
2017	Stephanie Wendt	Coppell	17	Miss North Texas' Outstanding Teen	Dance, "I Believe" by Fantasia Barrino	3rd runner-up	Preliminary Evening Wear/OSQ Award Scholastic Excellence Award	2nd runner-up at Miss Texas 2022. Top 10 at Miss Texas 2023. 1st runner-up at Miss Texas 2025 and 2026. Later assumed Miss Texas 2026
2016	Heather King	Frisco	17	Miss Frisco's Outstanding Teen	Vocal	Top 11	Spirit of America Award	
2015	Addyson Jackson	Frisco	16	Miss Plano's Outstanding Teen	Dance	1st runner-up		
2014	Kassidy Brown	Lufkin	17	Miss Dallas' Outstanding Teen	Contemporary Jazz en Pointe, "It's Oh So Quiet" by Björk	Top 7		
2013	Sheridan Donevant	Houston	16	Miss Houston's Outstanding Teen	Dance	Top 12	America's Choice Award	Semi-finalist at Miss Texas Teen USA 2015
2012	Margana Wood	Houston	17	Miss Houston's Outstanding Teen	Dance	Top 8		Later Miss Texas 2017; 4th runner-up at Miss America 2018 pageant
2011	Reilly Johannsen	Irving	16	Miss Colleyville's Outstanding Teen	Dance	3rd runner-up		
2010	Madison Fuller	Fairfield	15	Miss Teen Frisco	Ventriloquism			Later Miss Texas 2018 Older sister of Miss Texas 2021, Mallory Fuller
2009	Taylor Lowery	Lufkin	16	Miss Teen Frisco	Gymnastic Routine to Circus by Britney Spears			
2008	Sydney Capello	Southlake	15	Miss Teen Duncanville	Pop Vocal, "Midnight Train to Georgia"	Top 10	Preliminary Evening Wear/OSQ Award Preliminary Talent Award	
2007	Callie Thompson	Katy	17	Miss Teen Montgomery County	Jazz Dance			
2006	Kendall Morris	Ennis	15	Miss Teen Southlake	Classical Piano		Preliminary Evening Wear/OSQ Award Preliminary Lifestyle & Fitness Award	Later Miss Texas 2011; Top 10 at Miss America 2012 pageant
2005	Heather Harris	Houston	17	Miss Teen Houston	Classical Vocal	N/A		Assumed title when Miller was named Miss America's Outstanding Teen 2006
2005	Meghan Miller	Beaumont	17	Miss Teen Farmer's Branch	Ventriloquism, Disney Medley	Winner	Overall Talent Award Preliminary Evening Wear/OSQ Award Preliminary Talent Award	Appeared on America's Got Talent
2004	Holly Gonzalez			Miss Teen Bexar County	Classical Ballet	No national pageant		
2003	Chase Brown			Miss Teen Frisco	Pop Vocal	No national pageant		
2002	Brittany Wellsfry	Wichita Falls	17	Miss Teen Farmer's Branch	Country Vocal	No national pageant		Initially named 1st runner-up at Miss Teen Texas 2002 pageant Assumed title when Anderson resigned
2002	Julia Anderson	Fort Worth	17			N/A		Resigned one month after being crowned due to her being arrested and charged with public intoxication
2001	Shea Yarborough			Miss Teen North Texas	Classical Ballet	No national pageant		
2000	Rebecca Robinson		16	Miss Teen Collin County	Tap Dance	No national pageant		Later Miss Texas 2008
1999	LeeAnn Haynie			Miss Teen Metrocrest	Tap Dance	No national pageant		
1998	Caitlin Sullivan			Miss Teen Farmer's Branch	Classical Ballet	No national pageant		
1997	Cindy Elizondo			Miss Teen Collin County	Classical Piano	No national pageant		
1996	Larkin Parker			Miss Teen Texarkana	Classical Ballet	No national pageant		
1995	AnaMichelle Lopez			Miss Teen Nacogdoches	Pop Vocal	No national pageant		
1994	Brooke Staudt			Miss Teen Houston	Ventriloquism	No national pageant		
1993	Tara Watson	Lufkin	15	Miss Teen Lake O' The Pines	Clogging	No national pageant		Later Miss Texas 2000
1992	Carly Jarmon		16	Miss Teen Hurst-Euless-Bedford	Pop Vocal	No national pageant		Later Miss Texas 1995 Married to 2002 World Series champion, Benji Gil
1991	Amanda Talbot			Miss Teen Lake O' The Pines	Pop Vocal	No national pageant		
1990	Brooke Bigelow	Kilgore	13	Miss Teen Greater East Texas	Pop Vocal, "America the Beautiful"	No national pageant		
