= Shannon Sanderford =

- Born: Shannon Lee Sanderford; March 9, 1992 (age 34); Coppell, Texas
- Education: University of Oklahoma
- Beauty pageant titleholder
- Title: Miss San Jacinto 2013; Miss Duncanville 2014; Miss Fort Worth 2015; Miss Texas 2015
- Hair color: Blonde
- Major competition: Miss America 2016

Shannon Lee Sanderford (born March 9, 1992) is an American beauty pageant titleholder from Coppell, Texas, who was crowned Miss Texas 2015. She competed for the Miss America 2016 title in September 2015 and placed in the Top 10.

== Pageant career ==
=== Early pageants ===
In her first try for Miss Texas, Sanderford won the Miss San Jacinto 2013 title. She competed in the 2013 Miss Texas pageant with the platform "Double Beauty" and a vocal performance in the talent portion of the competition. She was named Overall Interview Winner but was not a finalist for the state title.

On November 30, 2013, Sanderford won the Miss Duncanville 2014 title. She competed in the 2014 Miss Texas pageant with the platform "Mentoring Made Easy" and a vocal performance in the talent portion of the competition. She was named was a Top-10 finalist for the state title.

=== Miss Texas 2015 ===
On November 29, 2014, Sanderford was crowned Miss Fort Worth 2015 which made her eligible to compete at the 2015 Miss Texas pageant. Entering the state pageant at the Eisemann Center for Performing Arts in Richardson, Texas, in June 2015 as one of 57 qualifiers, Sanderford's competition talent was a pop vocal performance of "Dear Future Husband". Her platform is "She Matters".

Sanderford won the competition on Saturday, July 4, 2015, when she received her crown from outgoing Miss Texas titleholder Monique Evans. She earned more than $15,000 in scholarship money and other prizes from the state pageant. As Miss Texas, her activities include public appearances across the state of Texas.

=== Vying for Miss America 2016 ===
Sanderford was Texas's representative at the Miss America 2016 pageant in Atlantic City, New Jersey, in September 2015. In the televised finale on September 13, 2015, she sang Dusty Springfield's "Son of a Preacher Man" during the talent portion of the competition. Sanderford placed in the Top 10 finalists and earned a $7,000 scholarship award.

== Personal life and education ==
Sanderford is a native of Coppell, Texas, and a 2010 graduate of Faith Christian School (Texas). Her father is Wayne Everett Sanderford and her mother is Nancy Lee Wilkinson Sanderford.

In 2014, Sanderford graduated from the University of Oklahoma where she earned a Bachelor of Arts degree in journalism and advertising. While a student at Oklahoma, she became a member of the Chi Omega women's fraternity. Sanderford is a marketing coordinator working in the Dallas area.

Awards and achievements
Preceded by Monique Evans	Miss Texas; 2015	Succeeded by Caroline Carothers
