= Rebecca Ann King =

Miss America (born 1950)

Rebecca Dreman
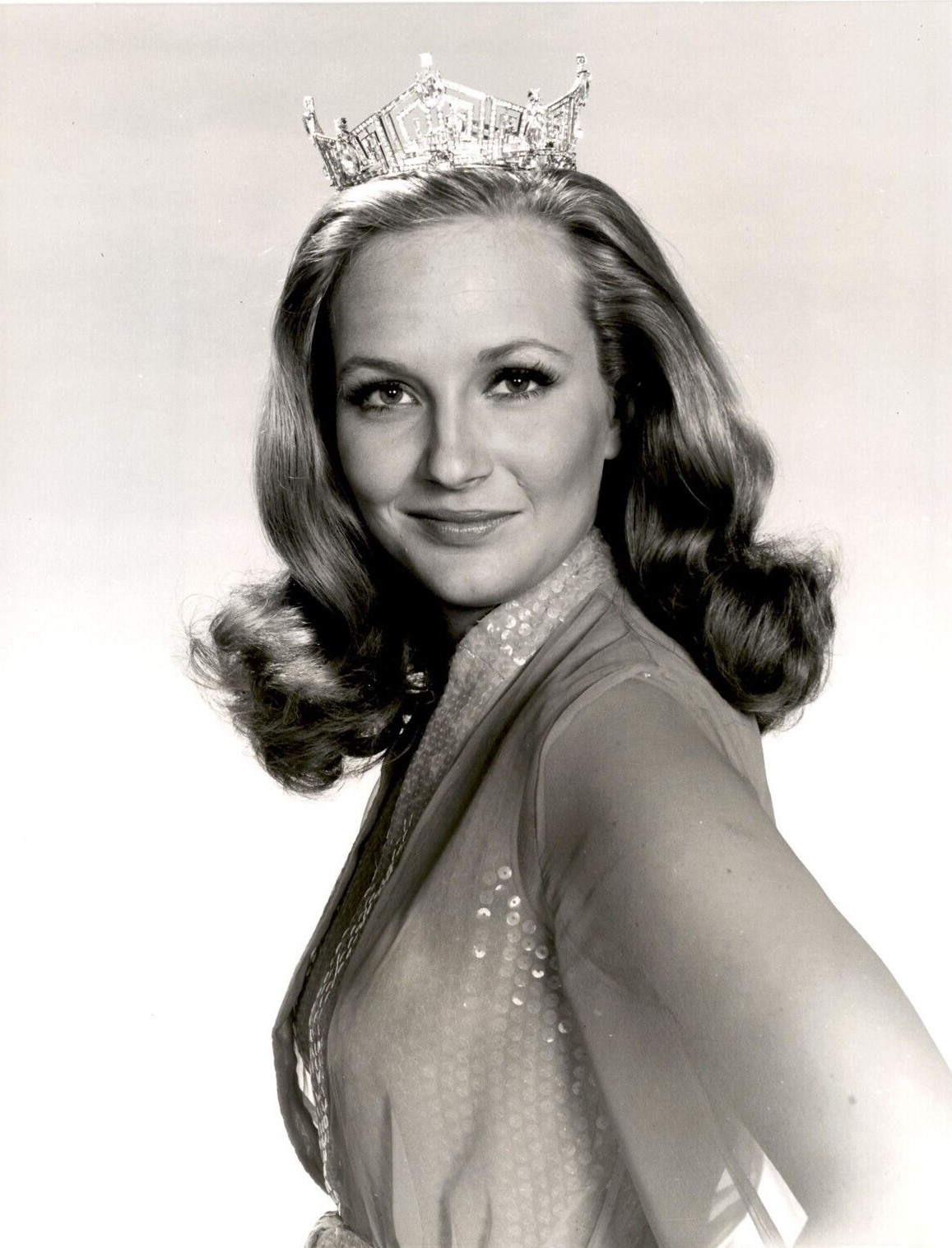
- King as Miss America 1974
- Born: Rebecca Ann King; April 14, 1950 (age 76); Hancock, Iowa, U.S.
- Education: University of Denver
- Occupation: Domestic-relations attorney specializing in divorce
- Title: Miss Metro Denver 1973; Miss Colorado 1973; Miss America 1974
- Predecessor: Terry Meeuwsen
- Successor: Shirley Cothran
- Spouse: George Dreman (m. 1992)
- Children: 2

Rebecca King Dreman (born Rebecca Ann King, April 14, 1950, in Hancock, Iowa) is an American attorney and beauty pageant titleholder, most noted for being Miss America 1974.

== Life and career ==
King was crowned Miss Colorado 1973 and later earned the title of Miss America 1974. Heralding the arrival of feminism in this most traditional of events, Rebecca King was a law student, who famously expressed feminist political views at the Miss America Pageant's morning-after breakfast following her coronation. She pressured the Miss America Organization to award points for the interview section of the competition and has spoken in favor of female empowerment at many schools and organizations.

King received a J.D. degree from the University of Denver School of Law and became a practicing domestic-relations attorney specializing in divorce.

== Personal life ==
She married banker George Dreman in 1992 and has since used the name Rebecca King Dreman. They have 2 daughters, Emily and Diana. Her daughter, Diana, won the Miss Colorado 2011 pageant and competed at the Miss America 2012 pageant, making her the first daughter of a Miss America ever to compete for the Miss America title. In September 2010, after she felt a marshmallow-like lump in her arm she was diagnosed with stage-4 melanoma.

Awards and achievements
Preceded by Terry Meeuwsen	Miss America; 1974	Succeeded by Shirley Cothran
Preceded by Sally Anderson	Miss Colorado; 1973	Succeeded by Cynthia Hunter
