= Through the Fire (1988 film) =

- Promotional poster
- Directed by: Gary Marcum
- Written by: Gary Marcum; Brad Potter
- Produced by: Charles C. Cunningham; Gary Marcum; Brad Potter
- Starring: Tamara Hext; Tom Campitelli; Randy Strickland
- Cinematography: Roger Pistole
- Edited by: Jay W. Helton; Lisa Lancaster
- Music by: Ron Dilulio; Grady Orr
- Distributed by: Talon Productions; Tapeworm Video Distributors; Overseas Filmgroup
- Release date: October 26, 1988 (Fort Worth)
- Running time: 88 minutes
- Country: United States
- Language: English
- Budget: $125,000

Through the Fire is a 1988 American horror film directed by Gary Marcum (as G. D. Marcum) and starring Tamara Hext, Tom Campitelli, and Randy Strickland. It follows a young woman in a Texas town who, with the help of a police officer, begins a search for her missing sister; in doing so, the two uncover a cabal of dilettante Satanists who have conjured a powerful demon.

Filmed in Fort Worth, Texas in 1986, Through the Fire had a limited screening there in late 1988. It was not distributed in the United States until 1997, when it was released on VHS under the alternative title The Gates of Hell Part II: Dead Awakening, falsely suggesting the film to be a sequel of City of the Living Dead (1980), a film by Lucio Fulci that was released in North America under the title The Gates of Hell.

== Plot ==
At a bar in Fort Worth, Texas, Sandra Curtis becomes inebriated and is escorted home by police officer Nick Berkley. Meanwhile, four men dabbling in Satanic occult practices meet for a gathering, and express regret over the fact that they have conjured the demon Moloch through their rituals. Shortly after, a woman in a local home nearby is brutally murdered in her garage.

Sandra phones Nick the next day and asks to meet him. Upon doing so, she asks him to help locate her sister, Marilyn, who went missing five weeks prior. Nick agrees to help Sandra. Sandra receives a parcel from a jewelry repair company addressed to Marilyn containing an medallion, and recalls that her sister always wore it. Meanwhile, members of the cult begin stalking Sandra, and a rash of disappearances continues, a second being two local men who vanished while rock climbing. Believing the disappearances may be connected to Marilyn's, Nick and Sandra visit the monolith where the men went missing, and find a pentagram symbol at the top of the cliff.

Nick brings Marilyn's medallion to the local university, where P. J., a professor, can examine it and translate the Hebrew text inscribed on it. She informs Nick that the medallion is intended to be worn by a "destroyer," someone put on earth by God to battle evil forces. P. J., a skeptic of the supernatural, meets with Nick and Sandra together to explain the historical basis of the amulet and demon-conjuring, during which a powerful stream of light enters the house and beams through Nick and Sandra. Rattled by the experience, the three agree to spend the night together, and Nick drives P. J. to her home to retrieve her clothing and belongings.

Sandra, alone in the house, discovers that her cat has been locked in her freezer and frozen to death. Later that night, the cultists raid the house in search of the medallion. Nick manages to shoot one of them to death, but they murder P. J. in the process. Nick and Sandra go into hiding at a hotel, where they are visited by Randy Sternman, one of the cultists, who attempts to explain to them that their duty is to enforce evildoing; he also reveals that, though he was a friend of Marilyn, the cult had to kill her.

Armed with guns and protective gear, Nick and Sandra track the cultists to an abandoned hotel downtown where they have been living. Inside, they find several of the cultists dead, including Randy, whose throat has been slashed. Each of the dead cultists are reanimated as zombies by the demonic Moloch, and begin stalking Nick and Sandra through the hotel. Nick is injured during an altercation with one of the zombies, leaving Sandra alone to fend for herself. Facing off with the possessed Randy, Sandra manages to hang from a windowsill outside one of the rooms while a grenade detonates inside, destroying him.

Nick reappears, but Sandra, believing him to be one of the undead, forces him at gunpoint to recite the Lord's Prayer to her to prove he is in fact alive. Though he struggles to recite it, Sandra quickly realizes through his stumbling that he has not been overtaken by Moloch, and the two depart the hotel.

== Cast ==
- Tamara Hext as Sandra Curtis
- Tom Campitelli as Nick Berkley
- Randy Strickland as Randy Sternman
- Billie Carroll as P. J.
- Dan Shackelford as Gary
- John Davies as Oscar
- Wendy Wade as Janet
- Terry Wegner as Al
- Martin Smith as Harry
- Lourdes Regala as Rita
- Dan Robbins as Ian
- Britt Scarborough as Mr. Skippy
- Danny Hulsey as Security Guard
- Cindy Able as Conni
- Tracy Baldwin as Marilyn Curtis
- Stacy Schronk as Landlord
- Beverly Brown as Mrs. Thompson
- Jane Sanson as Barney Mom
- Joel Kirkpatrick as Barney
- Joe Jenkins as Allen

== Production ==
Through the Fire was shot on location in Fort Worth, Texas in the summer of 1986 on a budget of $125,000. Filming locations included the then-abandoned Blackstone Hotel and Hulen Mall.

== Release ==
Through the Fire had a small screening in Fort Worth, Texas, where it was filmed, on October 26, 1988 at the Ridglea Theatre.

=== Critical response ===
Michael H. Price of the Fort Worth Star-Telegram wrote that while the film's special effects "fail the story early on," they "rally toward the end in a rampage sequence that will linger in memory long after moments of ineptitude have been forgotten." Price added that the film's buddy humor between the two lead characters "tends to overwhelm the suspense, but comes in hand for the denouement."

=== Home media ===
The film was not distributed in the United States until nearly ten years after its original production. It was given a VHS release on April 18, 1997 by Creature Features under the title The Gates of Hell Part II: Dead Awakening, falsely suggesting the film was a sequel to Lucio Fulci's City of the Living Dead (1980), which was titled The Gates of Hell in the United States.

In 2021, Vinegar Syndrome released the film for the first time on Blu-ray, featuring a new 2K scan of the original film elements.
