= Miss Texas =

Beauty pageant competition

- Formation: 1923
- Type: Beauty pageant
- Headquarters: Richardson
- Location: Texas
- Members: Miss America
- Official language: English
- State Director: Jan Mitchell
- Website: www.misstexas.org

The Miss Texas competition was founded in 1937 as a scholarship contest for young women. The winner represents Texas in the Miss America pageant; four winners have gone on to be crowned Miss America.

To become Miss Texas, a contestant must first win a local competition. A young woman may compete at the local and state level more than once, but may only compete in the national Miss America competition one time. Hundreds of women participate each year in the local pageants, culminating in the selection of local finalists who compete for the Miss Texas title each July. The state pageant was held in Fort Worth for 36 years before relocating to the University of Texas at Arlington's Texas Hall in 2009. In 2012, the pageant moved to the Allen Event Center in suburban Collin County. In 2014 the Miss Texas pageant began being held at the Eisemann Center for Performing Arts in Richardson, Texas.

In 2010, Miss Texas celebrated its 75th anniversary, and Randy Pruett wrote a book, A Dream as Big as Texas, to document the stories of the 75 women that were crowned Miss Texas.

Regan Hutsell of Houston was crowned Miss Texas on June 27, 2026, at Eisemann Center in Richardson, Texas. She represented Texas and won the title of Miss America 2027 on September 6, 2026, in West Palm Beach, Florida. She is the fourth Texan to win the title.

Stephanie Wendt of Coppell was named the new Miss Texas on September 12, 2026.

== Gallery of past titleholders ==
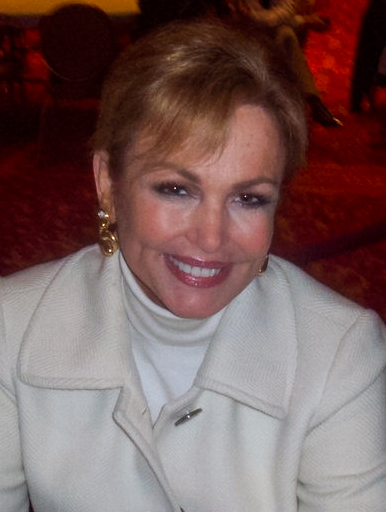
Phyllis George,
Miss Texas 1970 and Miss America 1971 in 2008

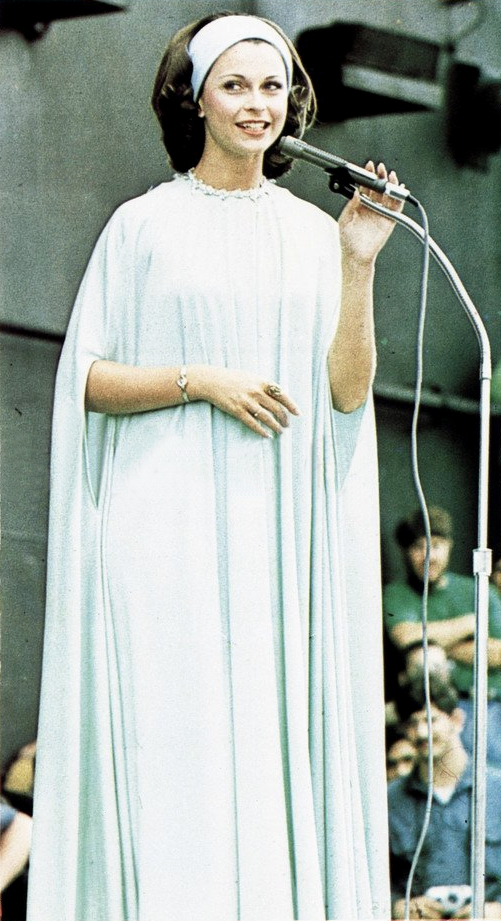
Shirley Cothran,
Miss Texas 1974 and Miss America 1975

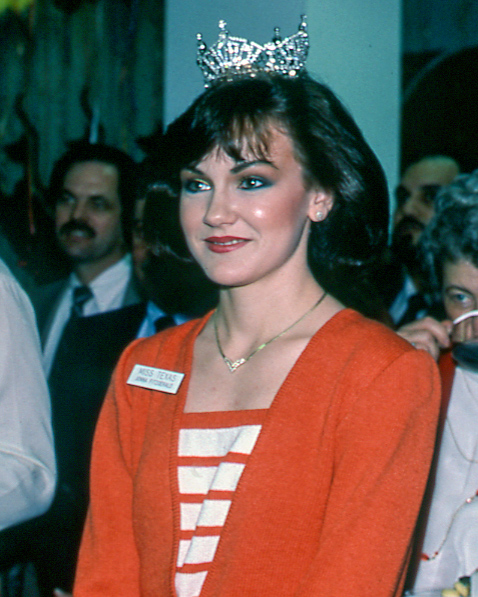
Jonna Fitzgerald,
Miss Texas 1985

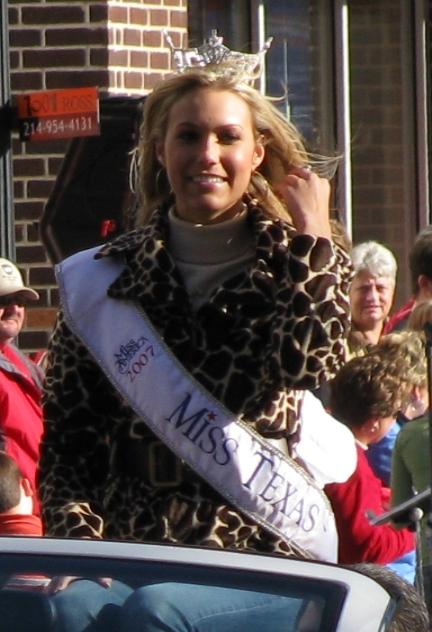
Molly Hazlett,
Miss Texas 2007

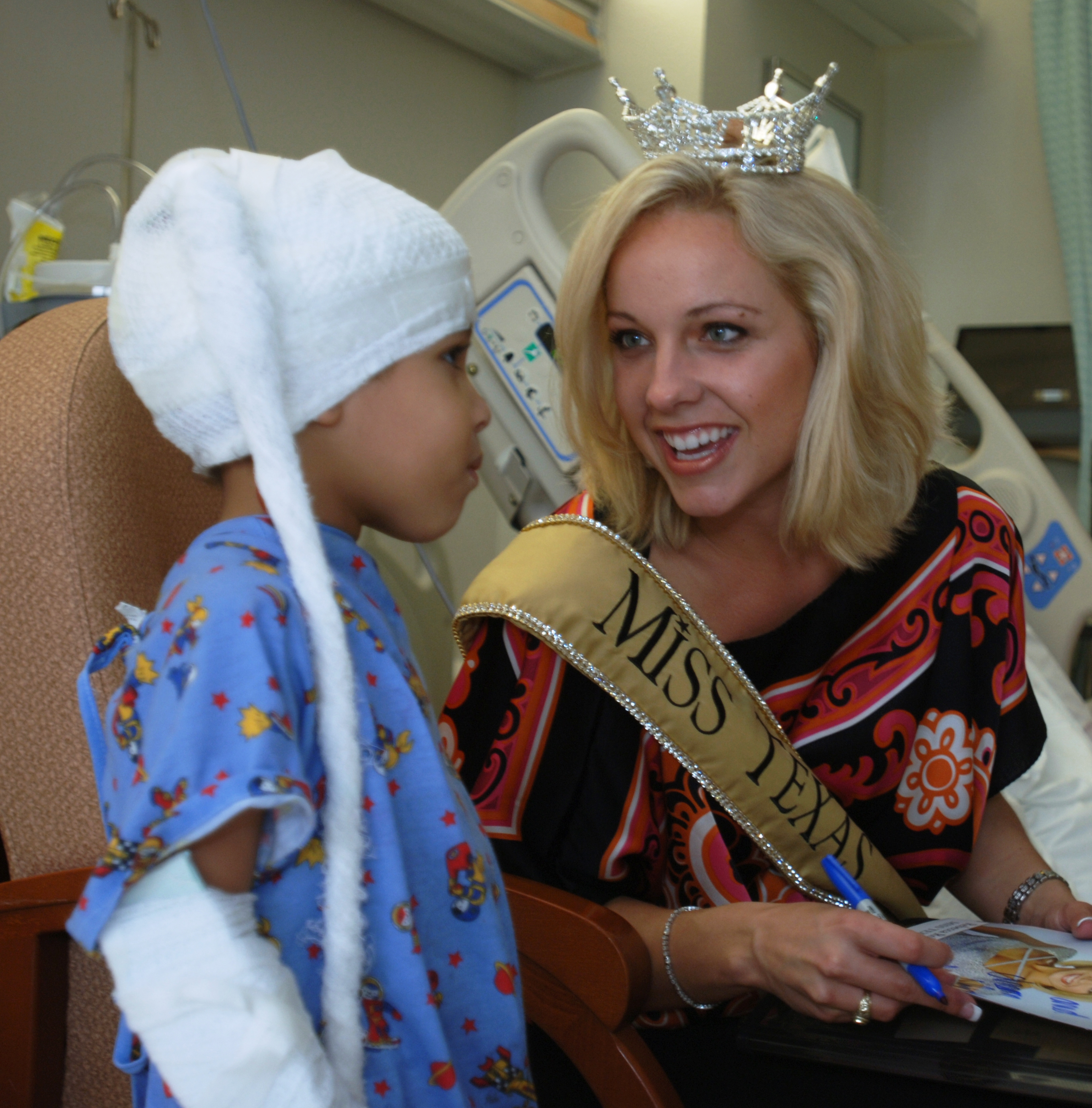
Rebecca Robinson,
Miss Texas 2008

== Results summary ==
The following is a visual summary of the past results of Miss Texas titleholders at the national Miss America pageants/competitions. The year in parentheses indicates the year of the national competition during which a placement and/or award was garnered, not the year attached to the contestant's state title.

=== Placements ===
- Miss Americas: Jo-Carroll Dennison (1942), Phyllis George (1971), Shirley Cothran (1975), Regan Hutsell (2027)
- 1st runners-up: Moselle Ransome (1927), Alice Emerick (1937), Shilah Phillips (2007), Ellie Breaux (2024), Annette Addo-Yobo (2025), Sadie Schiermeyer (2026)
- 2nd runners-up: Penny Lee Rudd (1963), Carmen McCollum (1977), Jonna Fitzgerald (1986), Averie Bishop (2023)
- 3rd runners-up: Linda Loftis (1962), Sharon McCauley (1965), Mae Beth Cormany (1973), Suzanne Lawrence (1991)
- 4th runners-up: Sheri Ryman (1982), Tamara Hext (1985), Yanci Yarbrough (2000), Margana Wood (2018)
- Top 7: Caroline Carothers (2017)
- Top 8: Molly Hazlett (2008)
- Top 10: Mary Nell Hendricks (1959), Susan Logan (1967), Judy Mallett (1974), Mary Ellen Richardson (1976), Lori Smith (1978), Sandi Miller (1979), Terri Eoff (1981), Dana Rogers (1984), Stephany Samone (1987), Rita Jo Thompson (1988), Leah Kay Lyle (1990), Rhonda Morrison (1992), Arian Archer (1995), Michelle Martinez (1997), Tara Watson (2001), Mary Lisa Dalzell (2003), Jamie Story (2005), Morgan Matlock (2006), Kristen Blair (2010), Kendall Morris (2012), DaNae Couch (2013), Ivana Hall (2014), Shannon Sanderford (2016), Mallory Fuller (2022)
- Top 12: Ashley Melnick (2011)
- Top 13: Polly Below (1945)
- Top 15: Rosebud Blondell (1926), Patricia Allen Green (1936), Charmayne Smith (1939), Chandler Foreman (2020)
- Top 16: Margaret Sommers (1951), Monique Evans (2015)
- Top 20: Stacy James (2002)

=== Awards ===
==== Preliminary awards ====
- Preliminary Fitness: Regan Hutsell (2027)
- Preliminary Evening Gown: Ellie Breaux (2024), Annette Addo-Yobo (2025)
- Preliminary Interview: Mary Lisa Dalzell (2003)
- Preliminary Lifestyle and Fitness: Jo-Carroll Dennison (1942), Phyllis George (1971), Shirley Cothran (1975), Carmen McCollum (1977), Tamara Hext (1985), Molly Hazlett (2008), Kendall Morris (2012), Margana Wood (2018)
- Preliminary Social Impact Pitch: Mallory Fuller (2022)
- Preliminary Talent: Jo-Carroll Dennison (1942), Linda Loftis (1962), Carmen McCollum (1977), Sheri Ryman (1982), Jonna Fitzgerald (1986), Stephany Samone (1987), Suzanne Lawrence (1991), Shilah Phillips (2007), Regan Hutsell (2027)

==== Non-finalist awards ====
- Non-finalist Interview: BaShara Chandler (1994)
- Non-finalist Talent: Marilyn Turner (1960), Mary Cage Moore (1961), Gloria Gilbert (1983), Sunni Cranfill (2004), Madison Fuller (2019)

==== Other awards ====
- Equity & Justice Finalists: Averie Bishop (2023)
- Miss Congeniality: Joyce Courrege (1944), Luna McClain (1947), Rebecca Robinson (2009)
- Louanne Gamba Instrumental Award: Kendall Morris (2012)
- Quality of Life Award Winners: Suzanne Lawrence (1991)
- Women in Business Winners: Averie Bishop (2023)
- Women Who Brand Winners: Averie Bishop (2023)

== Winners ==
- Declared as winner
- Ended as a runner-up
- Ended as a finalist or semi-finalist

Year	Name	Hometown	Age	Local Title	Miss America Talent	Placement at Miss America	Special scholarships at Miss America	Notes
2026	Stephanie Wendt	Coppell	26	Miss Park Cities	Lyrical Dance	Did not compete; originally 1st runner-up, later assumed title when Hutsell won Miss America 2027		Previously Miss Texas' Outstanding Teen 2017; 3rd Runner-Up at Miss America's Outstanding Teen 2018
2026	Regan Hutsell	Houston	25	Miss Houston	Jazz Dance, "Le Jazz Hot!" from the film Victor/Victoria	Winner	Preliminary Fitness Winner Preliminary Talent Winner	Former Radio City Rockette
2025	Sadie Schiermeyer	Frisco	22	Miss Richardson	Jazz Dance, "That's Life"	1st Runner-Up		Daughter of Miss Texas 1994, Arian Archer Orlando
2024	Annette Addo-Yobo	Southlake	25	Miss Southlake	Slam Poetry, "Autism Speaks"	1st Runner-Up	Preliminary Evening Gown Winner	First immigrant born and Ghanaian winner 2023 & 2024 Overall Interview Winner at Miss Texas
2023	Ellie Breaux	Houston	22	Miss Tarrant County	Rhythmic Gymnastics/Dance, "Hold my Hand"	1st Runner-Up	Preliminary Evening Gown Winner	
2022	Averie Bishop	Dallas	26	Miss Carrollton	Vocal, "On my Own"	2nd Runner-Up	Women in Business Winner Women Who Brand Winner Equity & Justice Finalist	First Asian American to win the title of Miss Texas Ran for Texas' 112th House of Representatives district in 2024
2021	Mallory Fuller	Fairfield	23	Miss Colleyville	Fiddle	Top 10	Preliminary Social Impact Pitch Award	Fourth Runner Up at Miss Texas 2019 Semi Finalist at Miss Texas 2018 Younger sister of Miss Texas' Outstanding Teen 2010 and Miss Texas 2018, Madison Fuller
2019–20	Chandler Foreman	Pearland	22	Miss Park Cities	Flute, "Ain't No Mountain High Enough"	Top 15		ABC Big 2 & Fox 24, teams Morning Anchor in Odessa, TX
2018	Madison Fuller	Fairfield	23	Miss Dallas	Ventriloquism, "I've Been Everywhere"		Non-finalist Talent Award	Previously Miss Texas' Outstanding Teen 2010 Older sister of Miss Texas 2021, Mallory Fuller
2017	Margana Wood	Houston	22	Miss Travis County	Contemporary Dance, "When We Were Young" by Adele	4th runner-up	Preliminary Lifestyle & Fitness Award	Previously Miss Texas' Outstanding Teen 2012; Top 8 at Miss America's Outstanding Teen 2013 pageant
2016	Caroline Carothers	San Antonio	20	Miss Plano	Baton Twirling, "Hot Honey Rag" from Chicago (musical)	Top 7		
2015	Shannon Sanderford	Coppell	23	Miss Fort Worth	Vocal, "Son of a Preacher Man"	Top 10		
2014	Monique Evans	Austin	22	Miss Park Cities	Ballet en Pointe, "Requiem for a Tower"	Top 16		Later Miss Florida USA 2020
2013	Ivana Hall	Cedar Hill	23	Miss North Texas	Vocal, "Fever"	Top 10		Later Miss Oklahoma World 2015; Top 22 at Miss World America 2015 pageant
2012	DaNae Couch	Coppell	23	Miss Dallas	Twirling, "Last Dance"	Top 10		
2011	Kendall Morris	Ennis	20	Miss Frisco	Piano, "New World Symphony"	Top 10	Louanne Gamba Instrumental Award Preliminary Lifestyle & Fitness Award	
2010	Ashley Melnick	Dallas	21	Miss Fort Worth	Vocal, "I Surrender"	Top 12		
2009	Kristen Blair	Southlake	22	Miss North Texas	Classical Vocal, "Chi il bel sogno di doretta" from La rondine	Top 10		
2008	Rebecca Robinson	Buffalo	24	Miss Longview	Tap Dance, "Hey Pachuco"		Miss Congeniality	Previously Miss Texas' Outstanding Teen 2000
2007	Molly Hazlett	Centerville	21	Miss Longview	Character Jazz en Pointe, "Rich Man's Frug" from Sweet Charity	Top 8	Preliminary Lifestyle & Fitness Award	
2006	Shilah Precious Phillips	Plano	25	Miss Frisco	Vocal, "I Believe in You and Me"	1st runner-up	Preliminary Talent Award	First African American to win Miss Texas title
2005	Morgan Matlock	Lamesa	24	Miss Fort Worth	Vocal Medley, "Come Rain or Come Shine" & "What Kind of Fool Am I?"	Top 10		
2004	Jamie Story	Bedford	23	Miss Arlington	Classical Piano, "Piano Concerto No. 1 in G Minor" by Mendelssohn	Top 10		
2003	Sunni Cranfill	Hooks	23	Miss Amarillo Area	Ballet en Pointe, "Carmen Fantasy"		Non-finalist Talent Award	Later Dallas Cowboys cheerleader in 2009
2002	Mary Lisa Dalzell	Magnolia	23	Miss Lake O' The Pines	Flute Medley, "Shenandoah" & "Dueling Banjos"	Top 10	Preliminary Interview Award	Evening Anchor at NBC affiliate in Fort Myers, Florida
2001	Stacy James	Texarkana	22	Miss Lake O' The Pines	Vocal, "Man of La Mancha"	Top 20		
2000	Tara Watson	Lufkin	22	Miss Hurst-Euless-Bedford	Vocal, "I've Got a Crush on You"	Top 10		Previously Miss Texas' Outstanding Teen 1993
1999	Yanci Yarbrough	Childress	24	Miss Hurst-Euless-Bedford	Vocal Medley, "Come In From the Rain" & "Stormy Weather"	4th runner-up		
1998	Tatum Hubbard	Odessa	24	Miss Arlington	Jazz Dance, "Hit Me With a Hot Note And Watch Me Bounce" from Sophisticated Ladies			
1997	Reagan Hughes	Midland	23	Miss Lake O' The Pines	Dramatic Vocal, "I Dreamed a Dream"			
1996	Michelle Martinez	Dallas	23	Miss Dallas	Classical Piano, "Ballade in G Minor" by Chopin	Top 10		
1995	Carly Jarmon	Mesquite	19	Miss Oak Cliff	Vocal, "Stand by Your Man"			Previously Miss Texas' Outstanding Teen 1992 Married to 2002 World Series champion, Benji Gil
1994	Arian Archer	Borger	20	Miss Amarillo Area	Vocal, "Almost Over You"	Top 10		
1993	BaShara Chandler	Garland	21	Miss Northeast Texas	Piano, "4th Movement of Sonata in C" by Alberto Ginastera		Non-finalist Interview Award	
1992	Amy Parker	Carrollton	22	Miss Tarrant County	Vocal, "A Sunday Kind of Love"			
1991	Rhonda Morrison	Coldspring	21	Miss Lake O' The Pines	Vocal, "My Funny Valentine"	Top 10		
1990	Suzanne Lawrence	Humble	21	Miss Humble/Kingwood	Country Vocal, "Sweet Dreams"	3rd runner-up	Quality of Life Award Winner Preliminary Talent Award	
1989	Leah Kay Lyle	Plainview	22	Miss Haltom-Richland Area	Piano, "Sonata Opus 22" by Alberto Ginastera	Top 10		
1988	Catalina "Cathy" Castro	McAllen	22	Miss Duncanville	Ballet en Pointe, "Les toreadors"			First Hispanic woman to win Miss Texas title
1987	Rita Jo Thompson	Lufkin	22	Miss Greenville	Jazz Dance, "An American Trilogy"	Top 10		
1986	Stephany Samone	Dallas	25	Miss Grand Prairie	Country Vocal, "Stand By Your Man"	Top 10	Preliminary Talent Award	
1985	Jonna Fitzgerald	Tyler	21	Miss Greenville	Fiddle, "Csárdás" & "Orange Blossom Special"	2nd runner-up	Preliminary Talent Award	
1984	Tamara Hext	Fort Worth	21	Miss Arlington	Vocal, "I've Got a Crush On You"	4th runner-up	Preliminary Swimsuit Award	
1983	Dana Rogers	Boerne	22	Miss San Antonio	Vocal, "An American Trilogy"	Top 10		Mother of Miss Nevada's Outstanding Teen 2019, Molly Martin
1982	Gloria Gilbert	Millsap	20	Miss Palo Pinto County	Ventriloquism & Vocal, "I've Been Everywhere"		Non-finalist Talent Award	Previously National Sweetheart 1981 Longtime hostess of the Miss Texas pageant television broadcast
1981	Sheri Ryman	Texas City	20	Miss Texas A&M	Gymnastics, Theme from Close Encounters of the Third Kind	4th runner-up	Preliminary Talent Award	
1980	Terri Eoff	Lubbock	19	Miss Lubbock	Dramatic Performance from A Bad Play For an Old Lady	Top 10		Appeared on the soap opera Search for Tomorrow
1979	Lex Ann Haughey	Hurst	20	Miss Haltom-Richland Area	Flute, "Flight of the Bumblebee" & "Flight '76" by Walter Murphy			
1978	Sandi Miller	Mesquite	20	Miss Red Bird Area	Classical Piano, "2nd Concerto in F Minor" by Gershwin	Top 10		Later Mrs. Texas 1988
1977	Lori Smith	Fort Worth	20	Miss Haltom-Richland Area	Vocal, "Moanin' Low"	Top 10		
1976	Carmen McCollum	Odessa	19	Miss West Texas	Saxophone Medley, "Wabash Cannonball," "Yakety Sax," & "If He Walked Into My Life" from Mame	2nd runner-up	Preliminary Swimsuit Award Preliminary Talent Award	
1975	Mary Ellen Richardson	Waco	20	Miss Waco	Classical Vocal, "The Jewel Song" from Faust	Top 10		
1974	Phyllis Lynne Barger		20	Miss Houston	Ballet en Pointe	Did not compete; originally 3rd runner-up, later assumed title after Cothran won Miss America 1975 title		
1974	Phyllis Lynne Barger		20	Miss Houston	Ballet en Pointe			Participated in Miss Texas 1973
1974	Shirley Jean Cothran	Denton	21	Miss Haltom-Richland Area	Flute Medley, "Bumble Boogie" & "Swingin' Shepherd Blues"	Winner	Preliminary Swimsuit Award	3rd runner-up in Miss Texas 1973
1973	Judy Mallett	Beaumont		Miss Haltom-Richland Area	Fiddle, "Csárdás" & "Orange Blossom Special"	Top 10		Performed in halftime show of Super Bowl VIII
1972	Mae Beth Cormany	Wichita Falls		Miss Hurst-Euless-Bedford	Vocal Medley, "Misty" & "Come Rain or Come Shine"	3rd runner-up		
1971	Janice Bain	San Antonio	21	Miss White Settlement	Classical Vocal, "Il Bacio" by Luigi Arditi			
1970	Belinda Myrick	Odessa		Miss West Texas	Country Vocal	Did not compete; later assumed title after George won Miss America 1971		
1970	Belinda Myrick	Odessa		Miss West Texas	Country Vocal			Toured with Miss America USO Troupe
1970	Phyllis George	Denton	21	Miss Dallas	Piano Medley, "Promises, Promises" & "Raindrops Keep Fallin' on My Head"	Winner	Preliminary Swimsuit Award	One of the first women sportscasters on network television as co-host of NFL Today on CBS (1975–77, 1980–83) Co-host of the 1989 and 1990 Miss America pageants with Gary Collins Died from complications from polycythemia vera (a blood disorder) in Lexington, Kentucky on May 14, 2020
1969	Dana Dowell	White Oak	19	Miss Longview	Percussion, "Cute"			
1968	Glenda Propes	Henderson	18	Miss Rusk County	Vocal and Dance	Did not compete; later assumed title after Hugghins resigned		
1968	Diane Hugghins	Tyler	20	Miss Nacogdoches	Jazz Dance, "Put on a Happy Face" from Bye Bye Birdie			Resigned after competing at Miss America 1969 pageant
1967	Molly Grubb	Fort Worth	20	Miss Fort Worth	Ballet en Pointe, "La Périchole"			As referenced on the television show Dallas, the winner in 1967 was Sue Ellen Shepard, the future wife of J.R. Ewing.
1966	Susan Logan	San Angelo	19	Miss Lubbock	Dramatic Monologue from Gone with the Wind	Top 10		
1965	Mary Lou Butler	Irving	19	Miss Nacogdoches	Vocal			
1964	Lenda Varley	Fort Worth	19	Miss Fort Worth	Vocal	N/A		Assumed title after McCauley resigned
1964	Sharon McCauley	Athens	20	Miss Athens	Vocal, "Let Me Entertain You" from Gypsy: A Musical Fable	3rd runner-up		After competing at Miss America 1965 pageant, resigned to marry the Miss Texas stage director
1963	Jeanne Amacker	Beaumont		Miss Austin	Vocal, "When You Wish upon a Star"			
1962	Penny Lee Rudd	Waskom	19	Miss Marshall	Jazz Dance, "Perhaps, Perhaps, Perhaps"	2nd runner-up		
1961	Linda Loftis	Fort Worth	19	Miss Fort Worth	Classical Vocal, "Sempre Libera" from La traviata	3rd runner-up	Preliminary Talent Award	
1960	Mary Cage Moore	Laredo	18	Miss Dallas	Spanish Dance, music by Manuel de Falla		Non-finalist Talent Award	
1959	Marilyn Turner	Fort Worth	19	Miss Fort Worth	Ballet en Pointe		Non-finalist Talent Award	
1958	Mary Nell Hendricks	Arlington		Miss Arlington	Vocal, "Getting to Know You"	Top 10		
1957	Carolyn Calvert	Austin		Miss Austin	Monologue from Medea			
1956	Barbara Therrell Murry	Houston	18	Miss Houston	Vocal			
1955	June Prichard	Seymour		Miss West Texas	Horseback Riding			1st runner-up at Miss Dixie 1957 pageant
1954	Yvonne Erwin	Dallas		Miss Dallas	Piano & Art			
1953	Paula Lane	Cleburne		Miss Cleburne	Fashion Design & Speech			
1952	Connie Wray Hopping	Littlefield	19	Miss Littlefield	Vocal			Connie Wray Hopping Nicholson died at age 92 on August 23, 2025 in Lubbock, Texas.
1951	Glenda Jane "Janie" Holcomb	Odessa	19	Miss West Texas	Dramatic Monologue, "Joan of Arc"			
1950	Margaret Sommers	Dallas		Miss Dallas	Classical Vocal, "Jealousy"	Top 16		
1949	Ysleta Laverne Leissner	Fort Worth	19	Miss Fort Worth	Ballet en Pointe			
1948	Bonnie Jean Bland	Orange		Miss Orange	Vocal/Art Display, "Put the Blame on Mame"			
1947	Luna McClain	Lufkin		Miss Lufkin	Vocal, "Smoke Gets in Your Eyes" & "Cowboy Boogie"		Miss Congeniality	
1946	D. Anne Wisener	University Park		Miss University Park	Vocal, "Embraceable You"			
1945	Polly Below	Galveston		Miss Galveston	Vocal	Top 13		
1944	Joyce Courrege	Orange		Miss Orange	Comedic Monologue		Miss Congeniality	
1943	No Texas representative at Miss America pageant							
1942	Jo-Carroll Dennison	Tyler	19	Miss Tyler	Vocal and Dance, "Deep in the Heart of Texas"	Winner	Preliminary Swimsuit Award Preliminary Talent Award	
1941	Gloria Ann Byrns	Port Arthur		Miss Port Arthur	Tap Dance & Baton Twirling	N/A		Returned as Miss Texas in 1941 because Texas held on contest Withdrew from Miss America 1941 pageant due to illness Gloria Ann Byrns Evans died in Texas at 89 on December 24, 2011.
1940	Gloria Ann Byrns	Port Arthur		Miss Port Arthur	Tap Dance & Baton Twirling			
1939	Charmayne Smith	Dallas		Miss Dallas	Vocal, "Round-Up Time in Texas"	Top 15		
1938	No Texas representative at Miss America pageant							
1937	Olive Henderson			Miss San Antonio				Multiple Texas representatives Contestants competed under local title at Miss America pageant
1937	Alice Emerick	Fort Worth		Miss Texas	Tap Dance	1st runner-up		Multiple Texas representatives Contestants competed under local title at Miss America pageant
1936	Patricia Allen Green	Corpus Christi		Miss Corpus Christi		Top 15		No Miss Texas Competed under local title at Miss America pageant
1935	No Texas representative at Miss America pageant							
1934	No national pageant was held							
1933	No Texas representative at Miss America pageant							
1932	No national pageants were held							
1931	No national pageants were held							
1930	No national pageants were held							
1929	No national pageants were held							
1928	No national pageants were held							
1927	Moselle Ransome			Miss Dallas	N/A	1st runner-up		Multiple Texas representatives Contestants competed under local title at Miss America pageant
1927	Mildred Casad			Miss El Paso	N/A			Multiple Texas representatives Contestants competed under local title at Miss America pageant
1927	Juanita Gilbert			Miss Fort Worth	N/A			Multiple Texas representatives Contestants competed under local title at Miss America pageant
1926	Rosebud Blondell			Miss Dallas	N/A	Top 15		Multiple Texas representatives Contestants competed under local title at Miss America pageant
1926	Winnie Law			Miss Fort Worth	N/A			Multiple Texas representatives Contestants competed under local title at Miss America pageant
1926	Zasada Lord			Miss Houston	N/A			Multiple Texas representatives Contestants competed under local title at Miss America pageant
1925	Elinore Wilkens			Miss Dallas	N/A			Multiple Texas representatives Contestants competed under local title at Miss America pageant
1925	Mary Louise Kilman			Miss Fort Worth	N/A			Multiple Texas representatives Contestants competed under local title at Miss America pageant
1925	Edna Francis			Miss Houston	N/A			Multiple Texas representatives Contestants competed under local title at Miss America pageant
1924	Vera Simpson			Miss Austin	N/A			Multiple Texas representatives Contestants competed under local title at Miss America pageant
1924	Freeda Rowley			Miss Beaumont	N/A			Multiple Texas representatives Contestants competed under local title at Miss America pageant
1924	Etta Mae Collins			Miss Dallas	N/A			Multiple Texas representatives Contestants competed under local title at Miss America pageant
1924	Hazel Doolin			Miss Fort Worth	N/A			Multiple Texas representatives Contestants competed under local title at Miss America pageant
1924	Lorraine Holzhaus			Miss Galveston	N/A			Multiple Texas representatives Contestants competed under local title at Miss America pageant
1924	Mary C. Wilmot			Miss Houston	N/A			Multiple Texas representatives Contestants competed under local title at Miss America pageant
1924	Name not known			Miss Irvington	N/A			Multiple Texas representatives Contestants competed under local title at Miss America pageant
1924	Katherine Hensley			Miss San Antonio	N/A			Multiple Texas representatives Contestants competed under local title at Miss America pageant
1924	Thelma Kirsch			Miss Texas City	N/A			Multiple Texas representatives Contestants competed under local title at Miss America pageant
1923	Bessie Laurene Roosa	Fort Worth		Miss Fort Worth	N/A			Multiple Texas representatives Contestants competed under local title at Miss America pageant
1923	Katherine Hensley	San Antonio		Miss San Antonio	N/A			Multiple Texas representatives Contestants competed under local title at Miss America pageant
1922	No Texas representative at Miss America pageant							
1921	No Texas representative at Miss America pageant							

== In popular culture ==
- In the long-running television series Dallas, the character Sue Ellen Ewing had purportedly won the title of Miss Texas in 1967, long before the events of the show took place (1978–91).
