= List of Miss America titleholders =

Miss America is an annual competition open to women from the United States between the ages of 18 and 28. Originating in 1921 as a beauty pageant, the competition now judges competitors' talent performances and interviews in addition to their physical appearance.

In January 2018, the new board of directors increased the maximum age of titleholders to 25 years old, from 24. Therefore, contestants could not be older than 25 years old on December 31 in the calendar year of her state competition.

In January 2023, the new board of directors increased the maximum age of delegates to 28 years old, from 27. Thus, participants must be at least 18 by the date of competition, and no older than 28 in the year of her national competition.

== Gallery of past Miss Americas ==
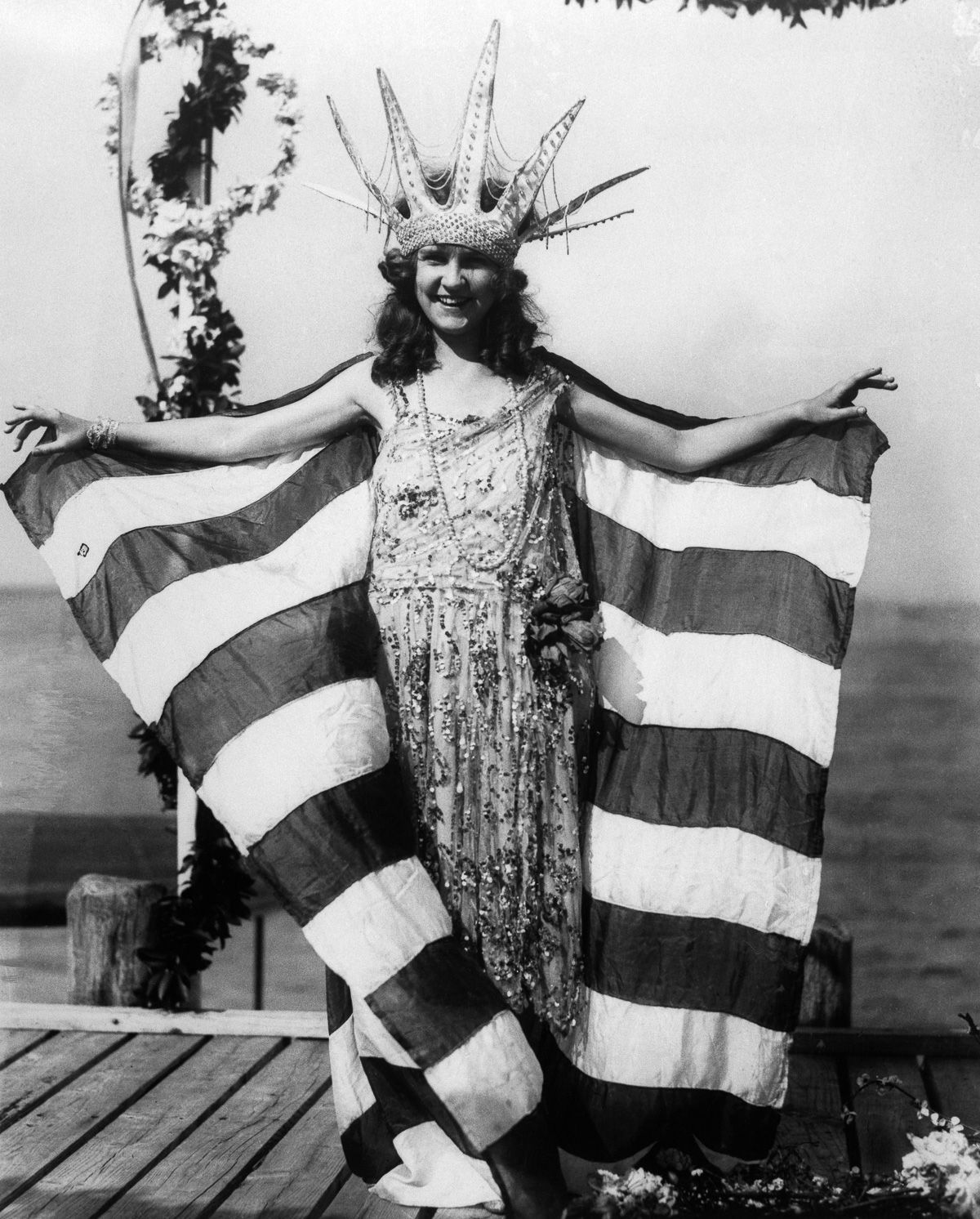
Margaret Gorman,
Miss America 1921

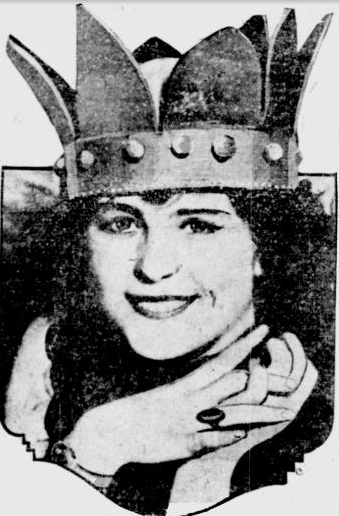
Mary Katherine Campbell,
Miss America
1922 and 1923

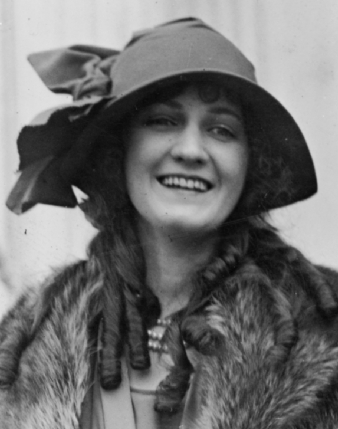
Ruth Malcomson,
Miss America 1924

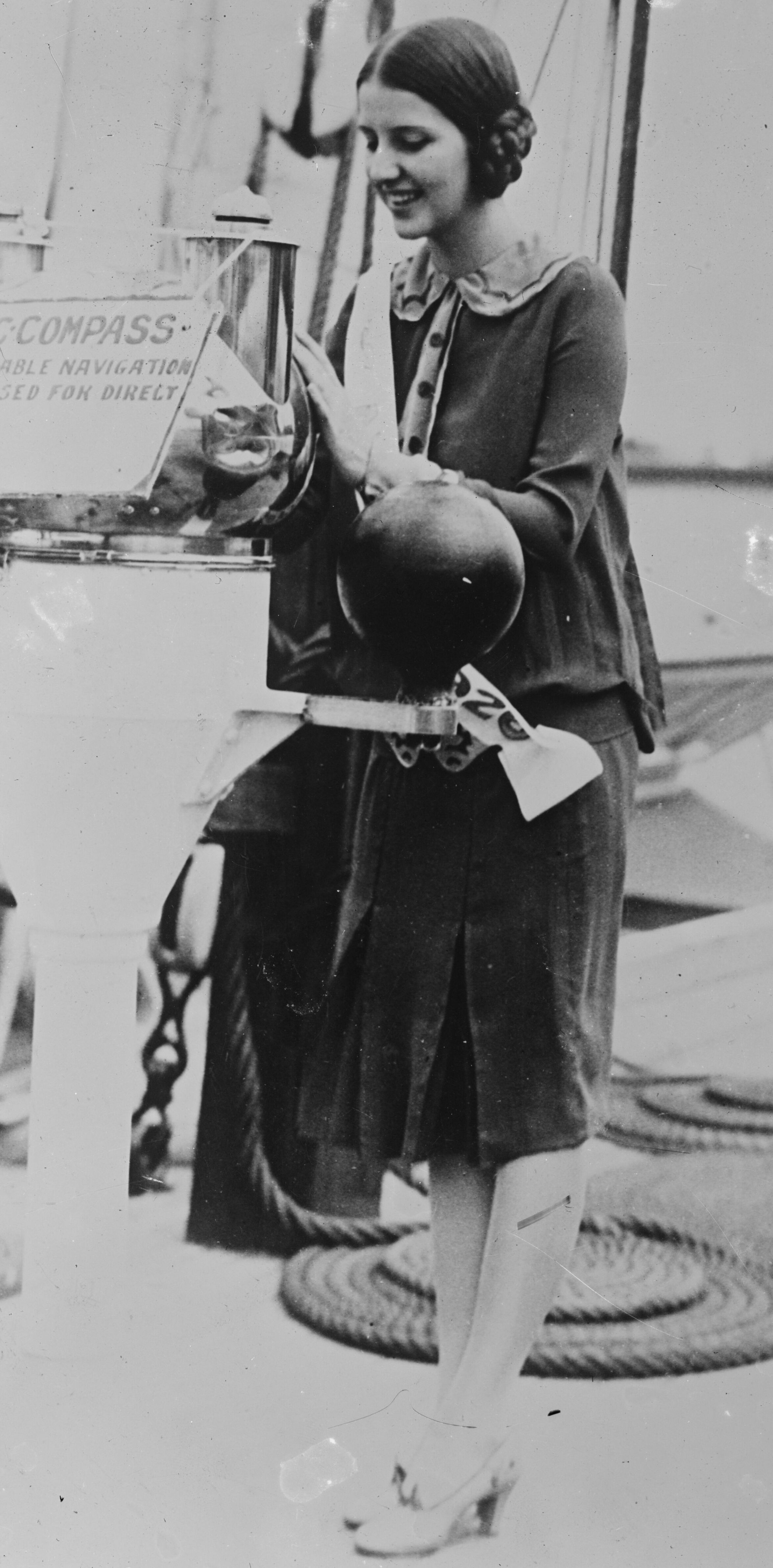
Norma Smallwood,
Miss America 1926

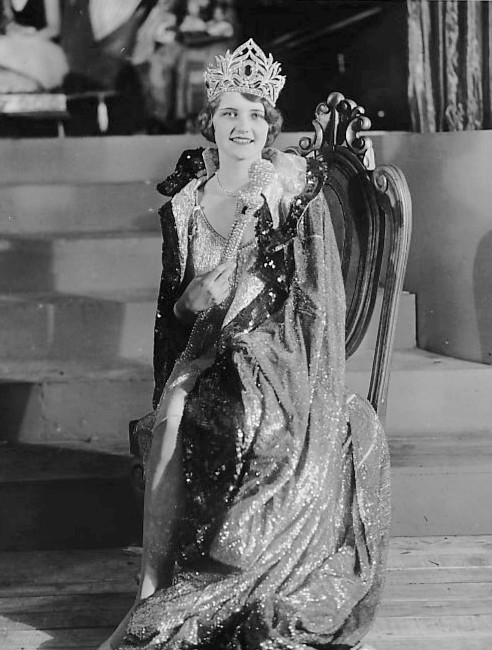
Lois Delander,
Miss America 1927

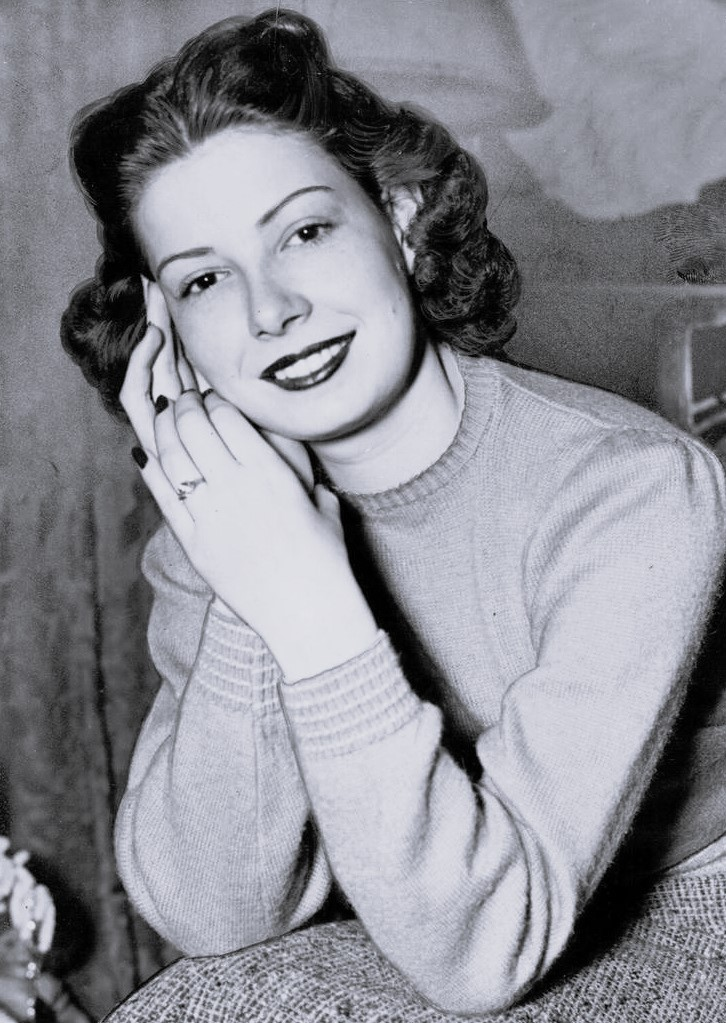
Patricia Donnelly,
Miss America 1939

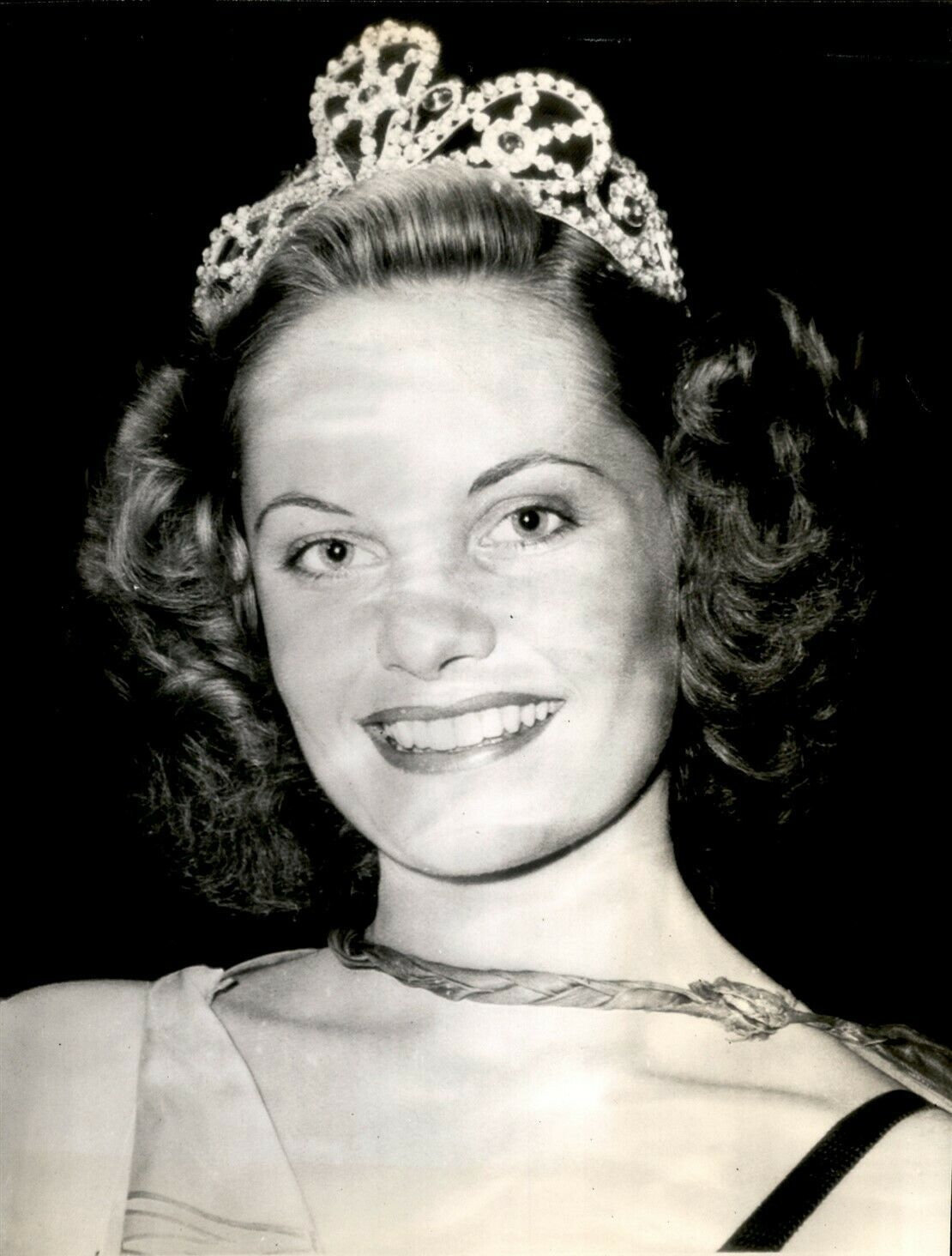
Jean Bartel,
Miss America 1943

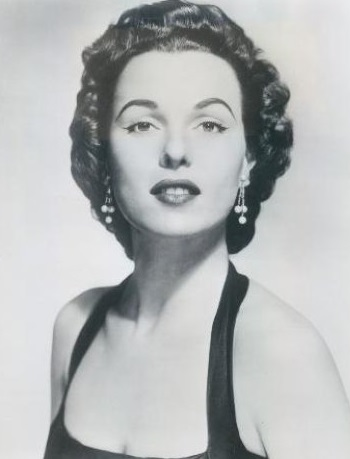
Bess Myerson,
Miss America 1945

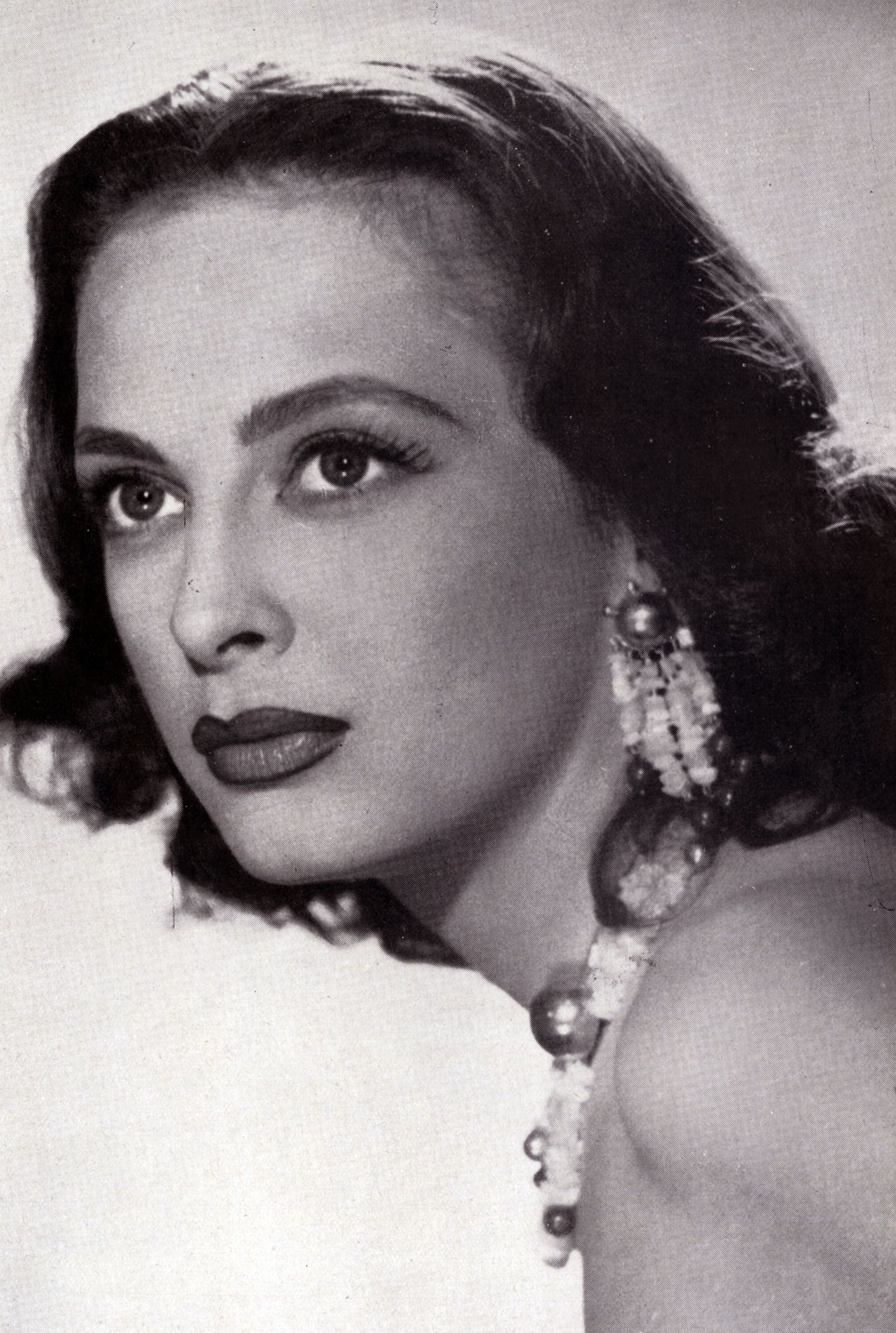
Marilyn Buferd,
Miss America 1946

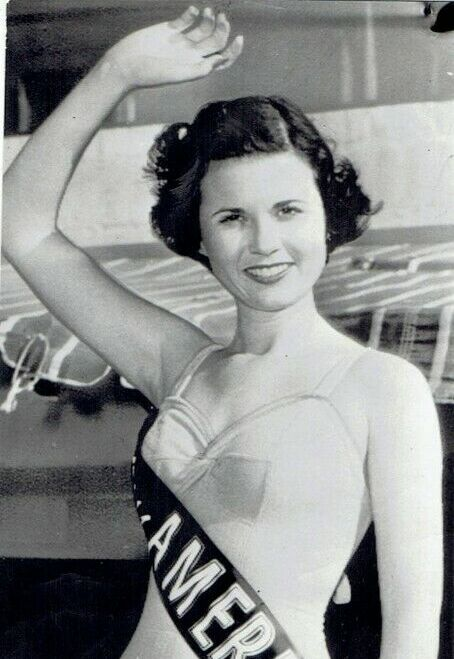
Jacque Mercer,
Miss America 1949

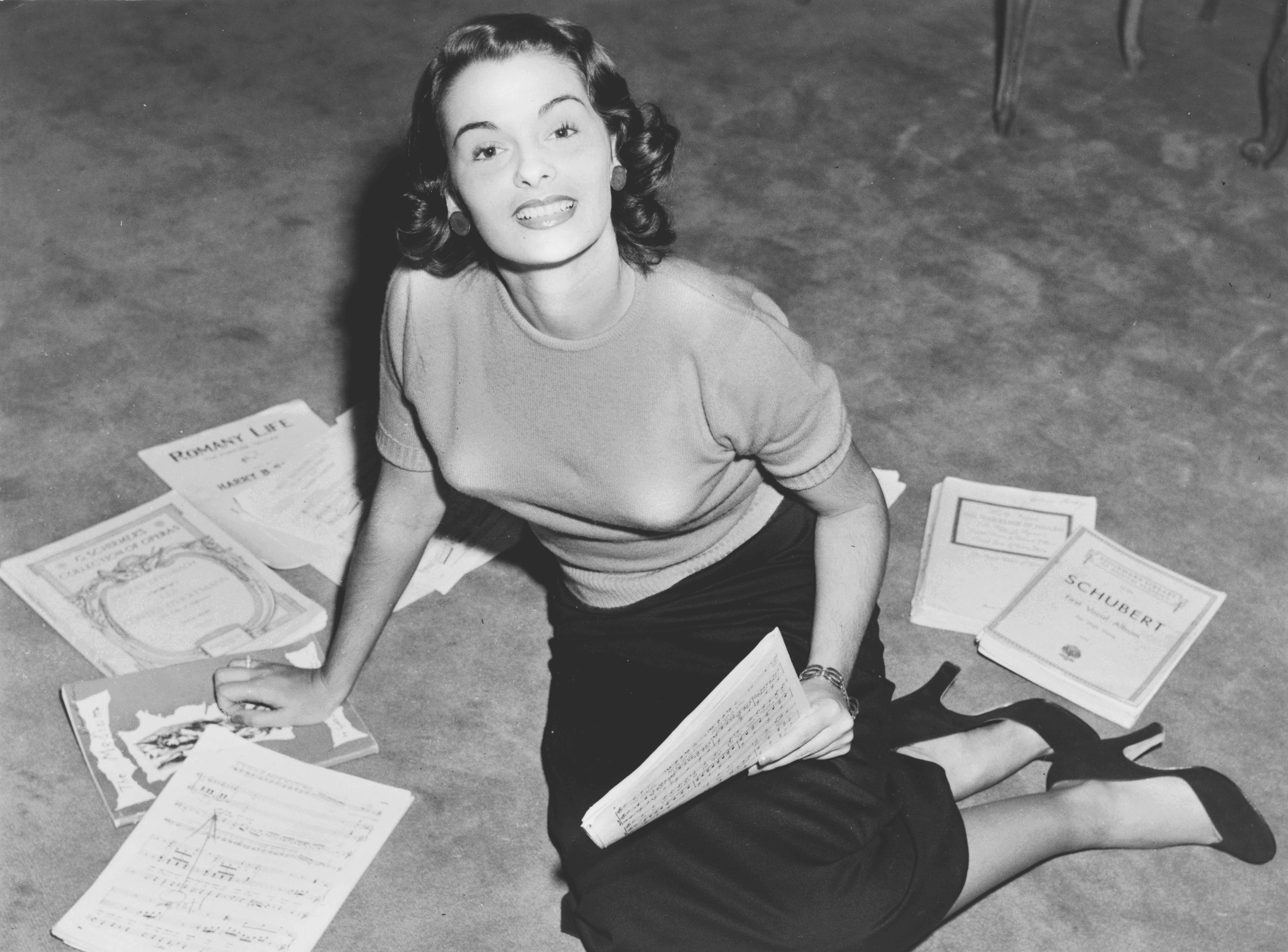
Yolanda Betbeze,
Miss America 1951

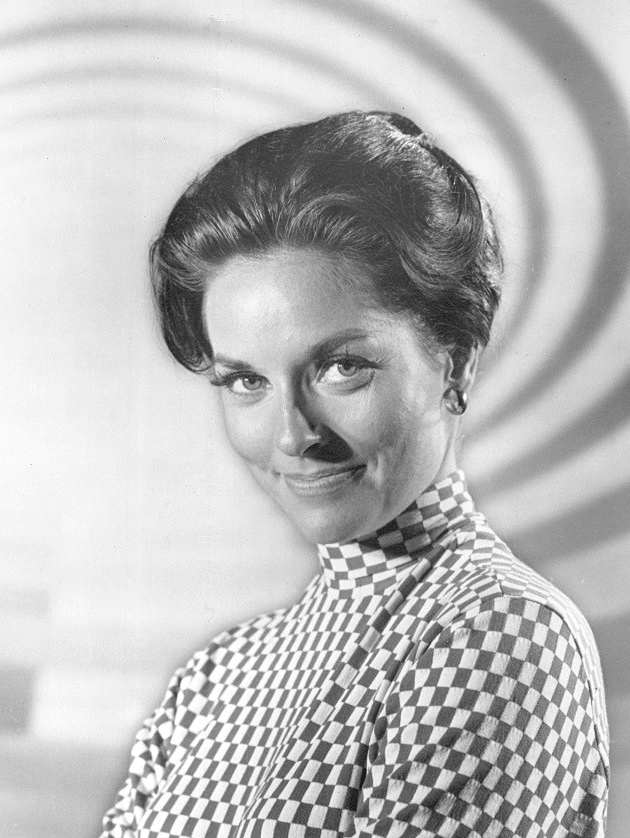
Lee Meriwether,
Miss America 1955

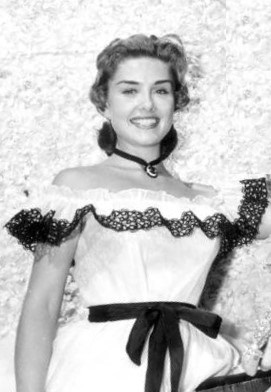
Marian McKnight,
Miss America 1957

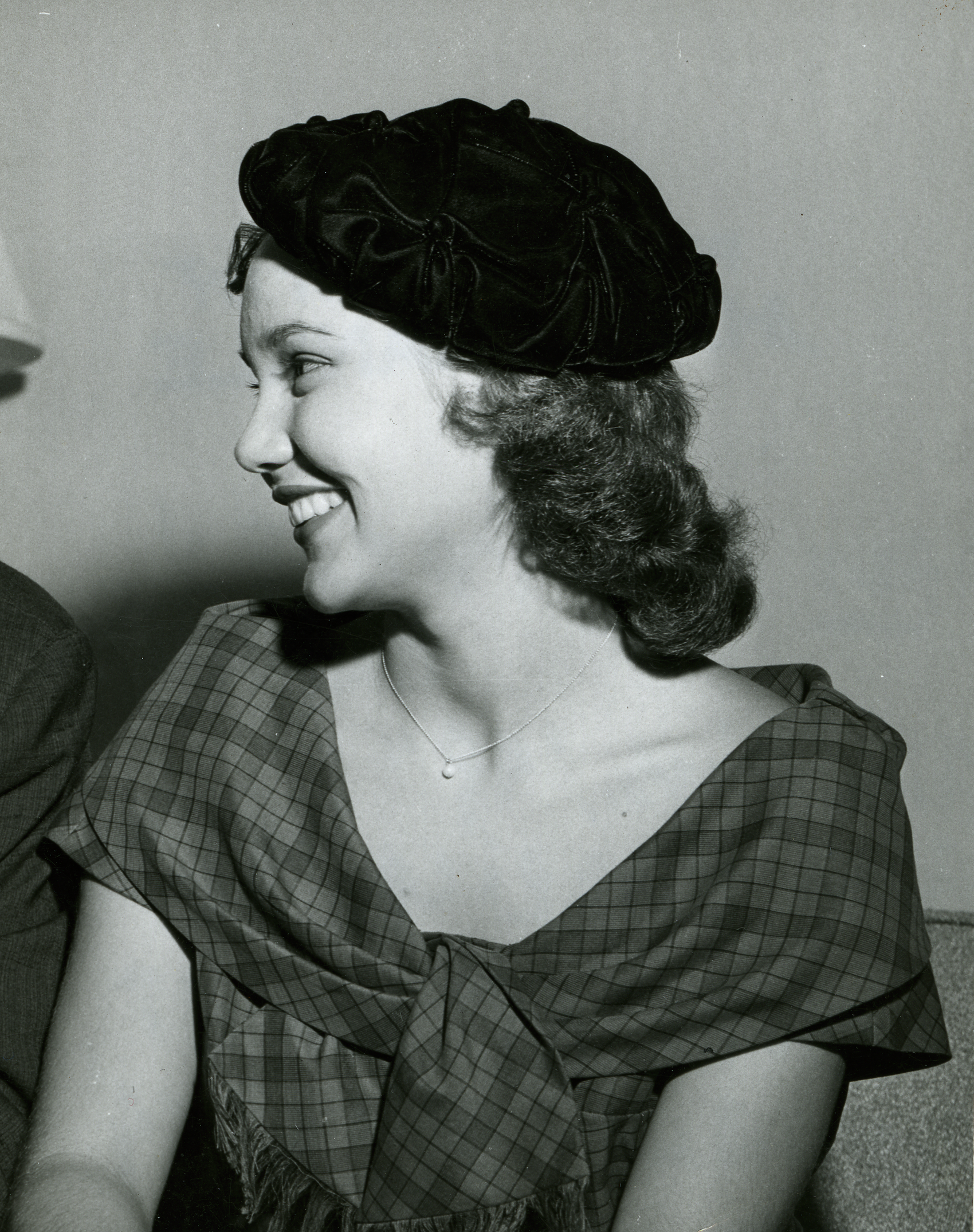
Mary Ann Mobley,
Miss America 1959

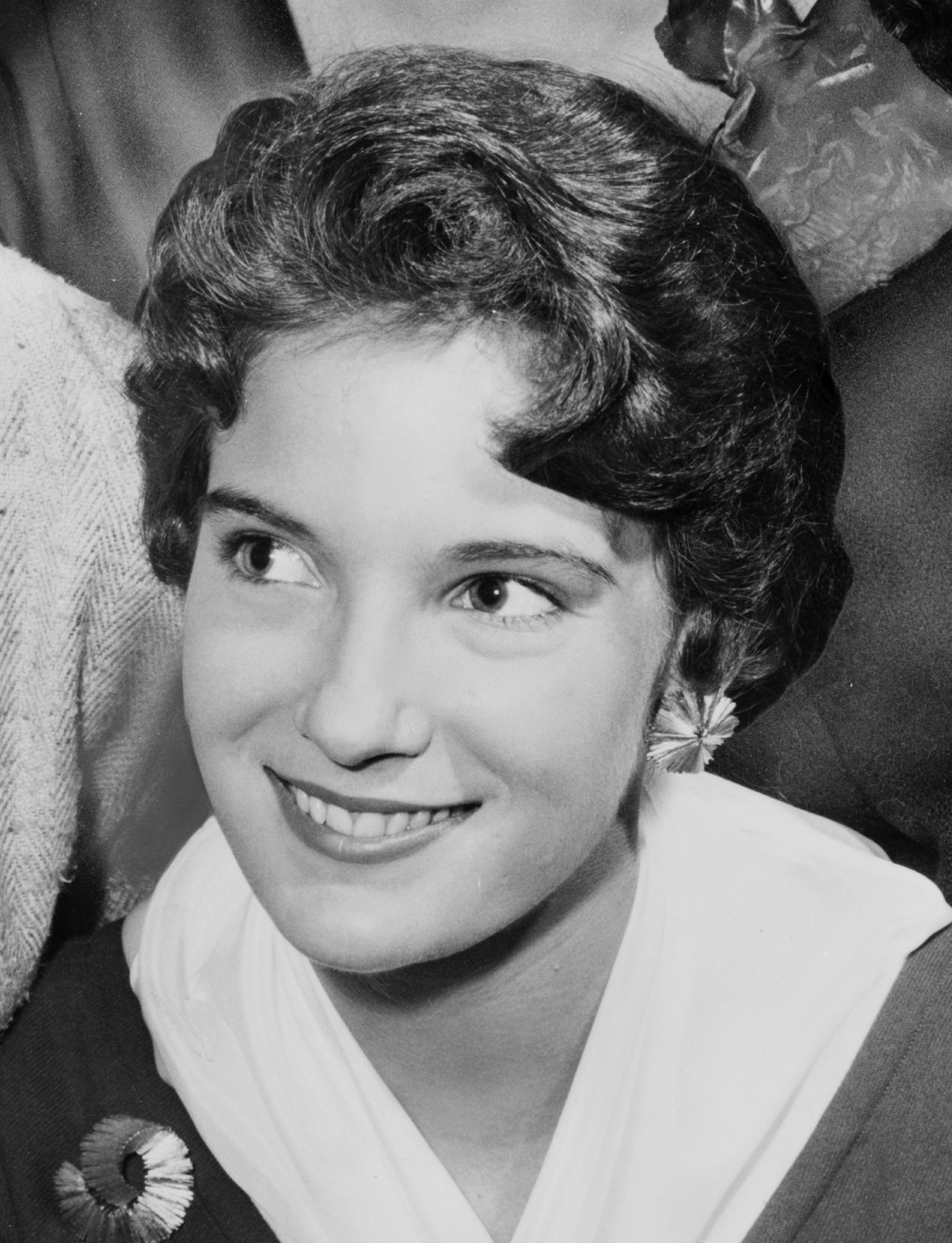
Lynda Lee Mead,
Miss America 1960

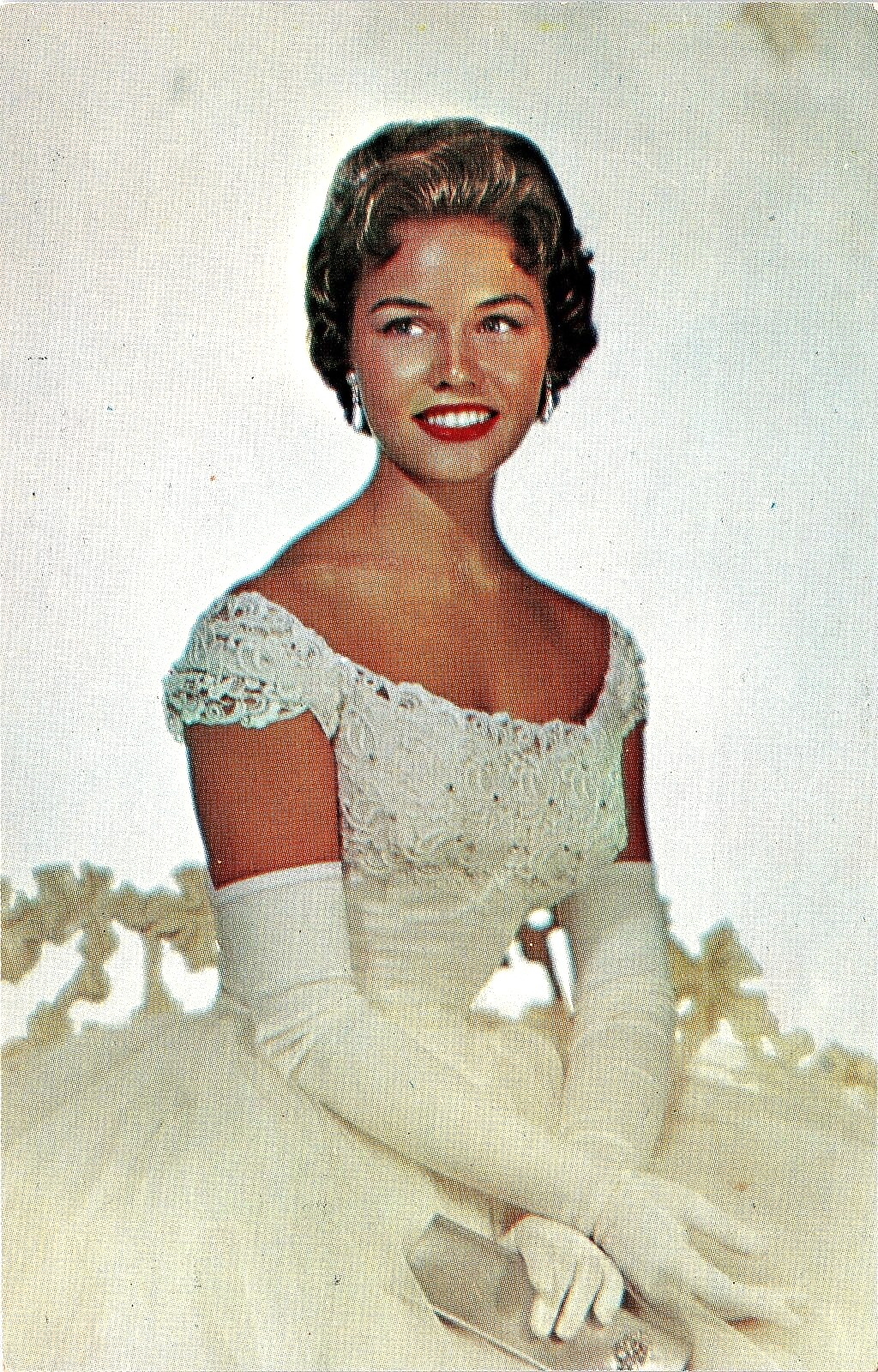
Nancy Anne Fleming,
Miss America 1961

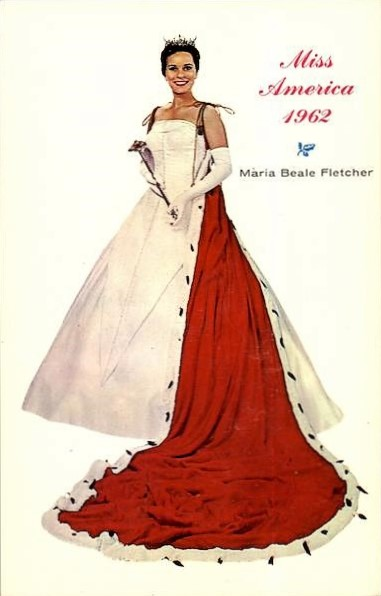
Maria Beale Fletcher,
Miss America 1962

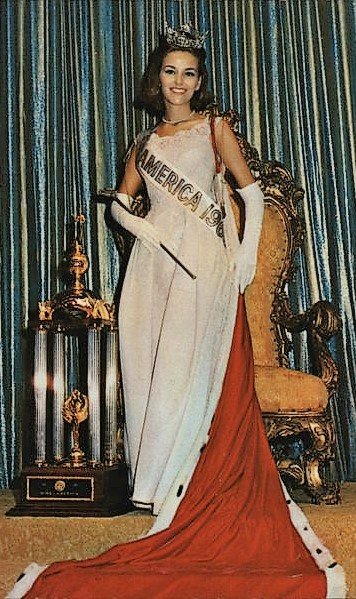
Deborah Irene Bryant,
Miss America 1966

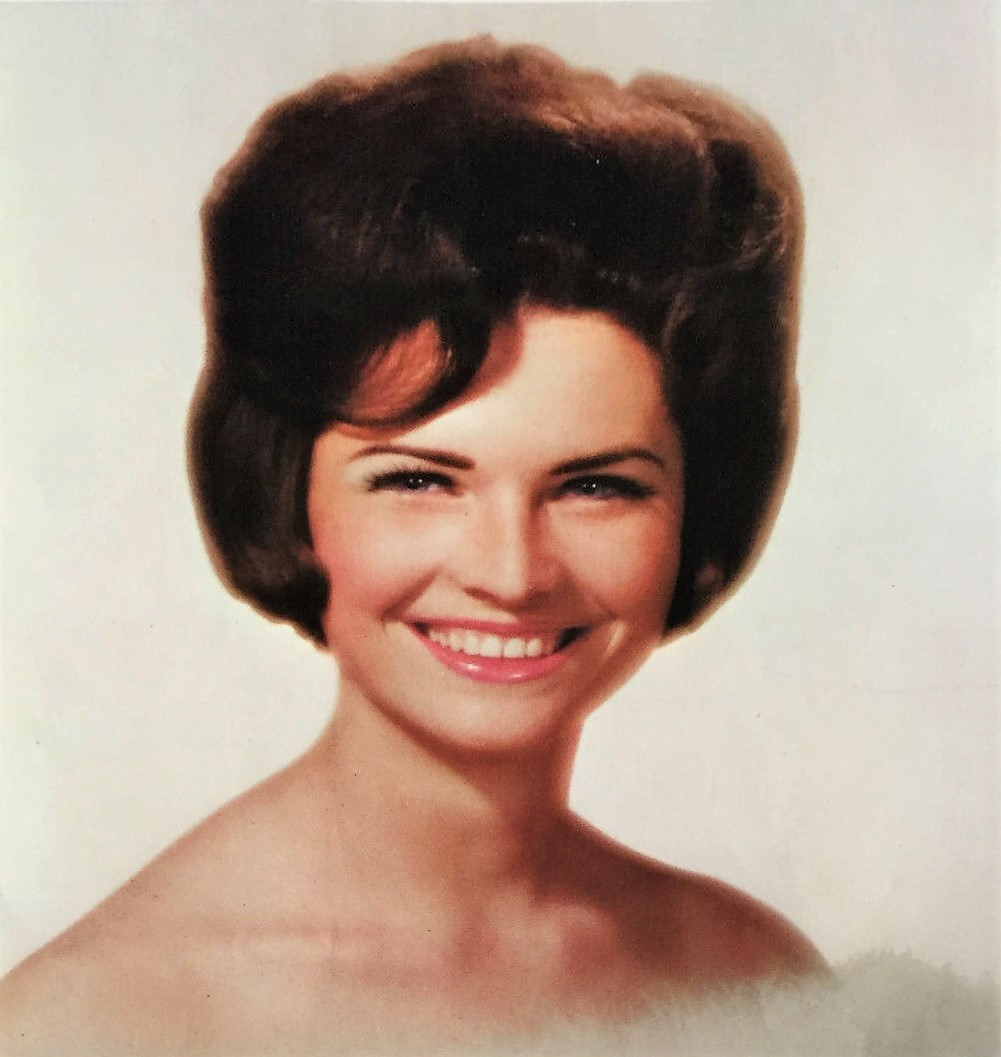
Jane Anne Jayroe,
Miss America 1967

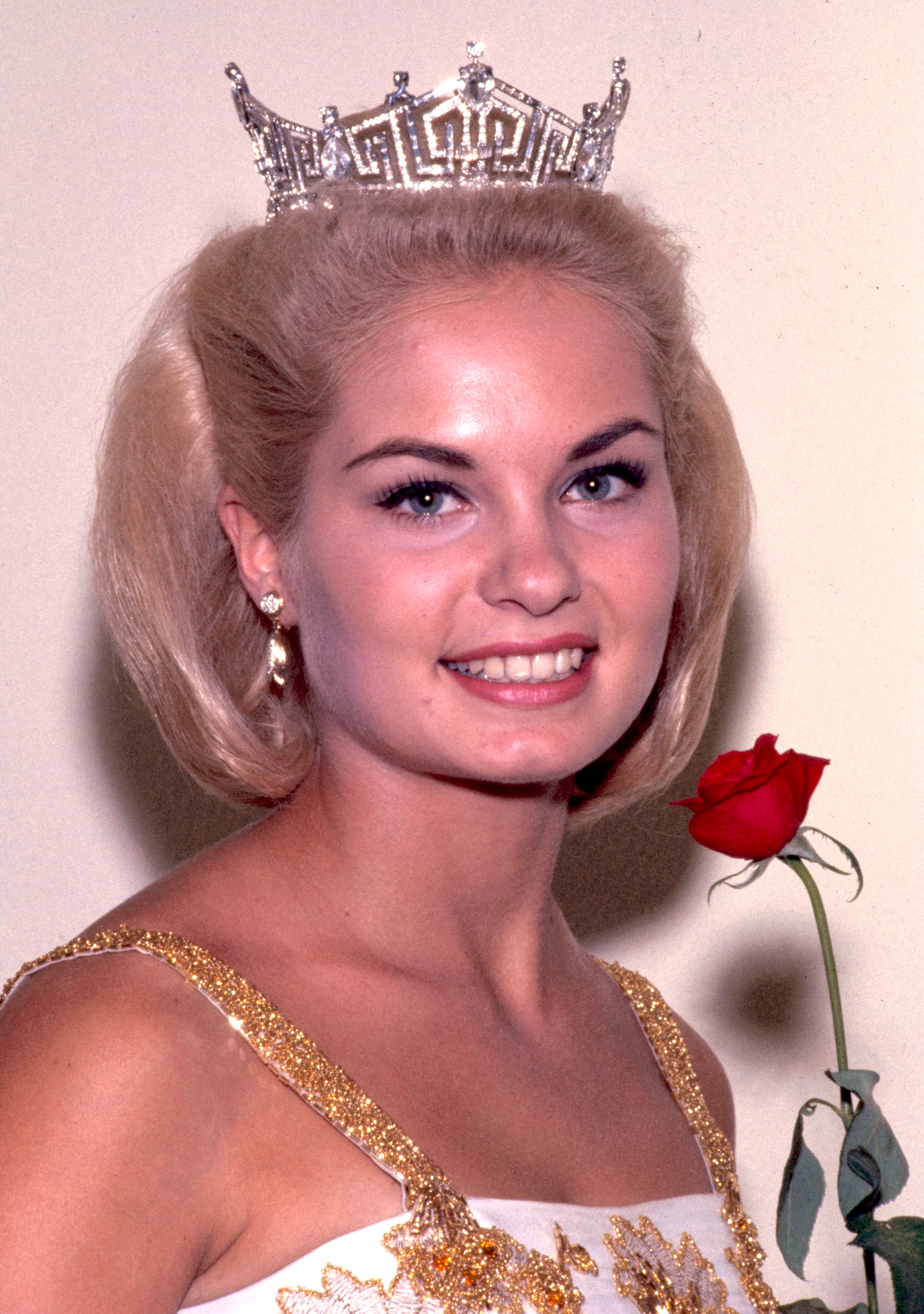
Judith Ford,
Miss America 1969

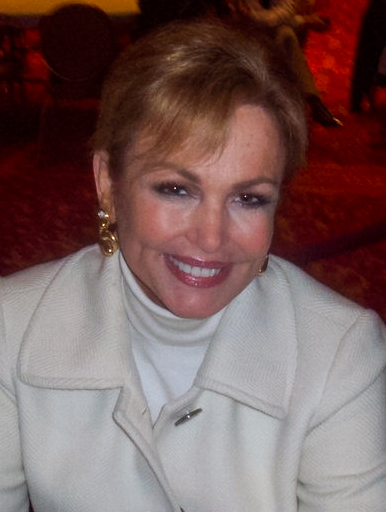
Phyllis George,
Miss America 1971

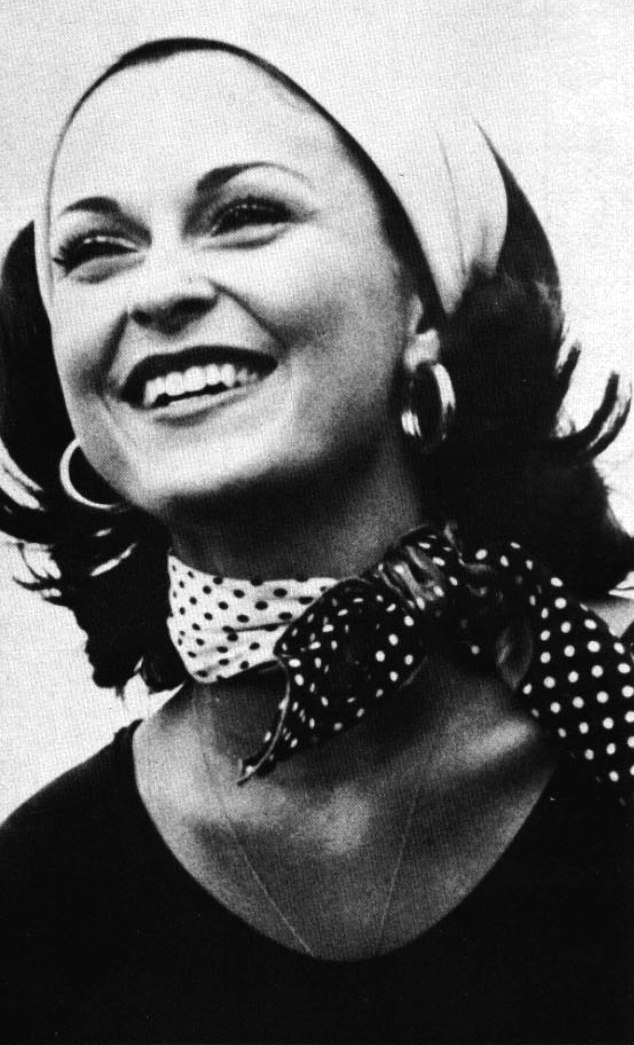
Shirley Cothran,
Miss America 1975

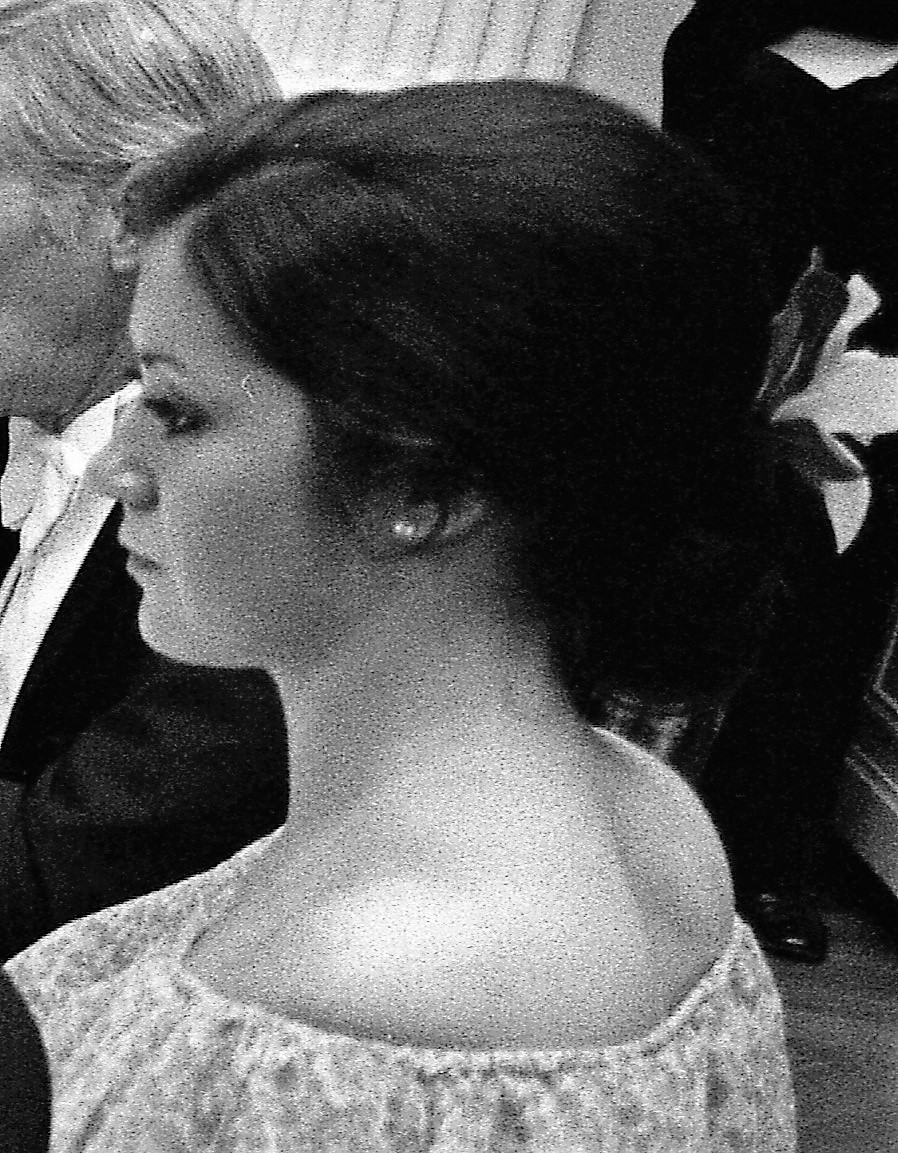
Tawny Godin,
Miss America 1976

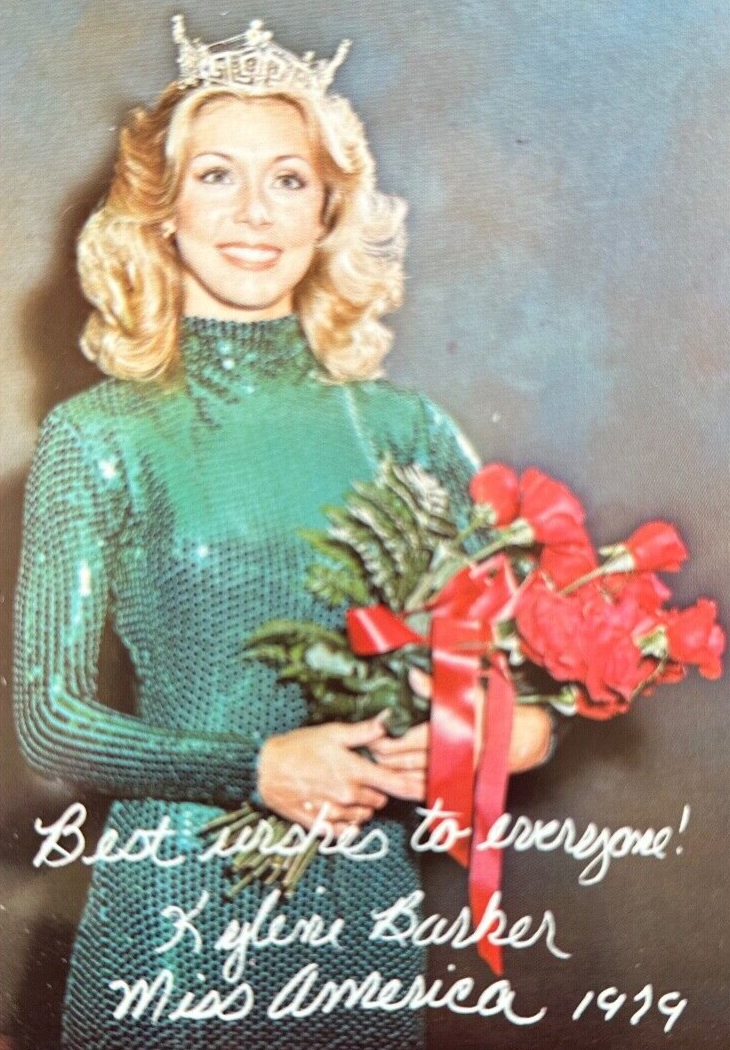
Kylene Barker,
Miss America 1979

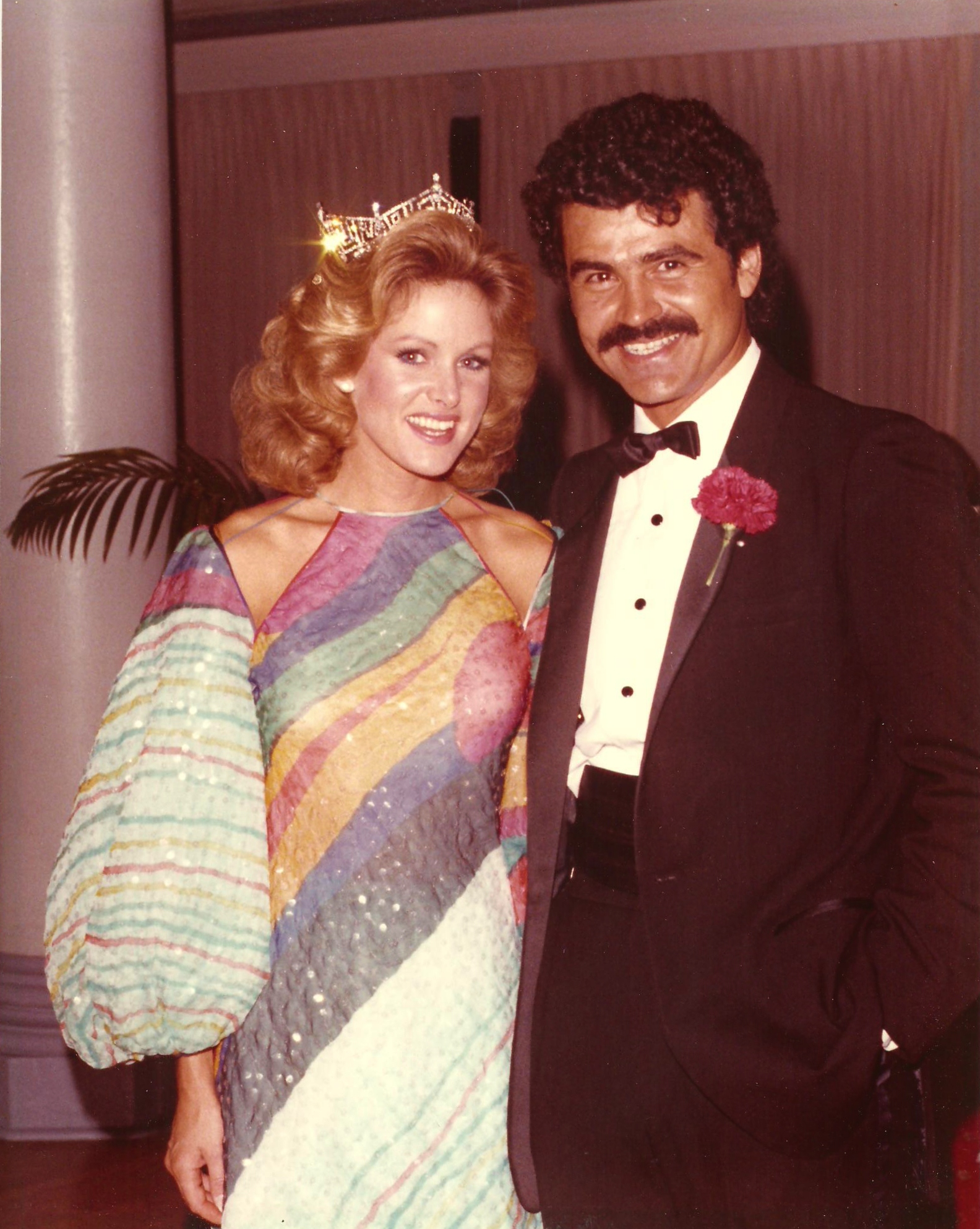
Debra Maffett,
Miss America 1983

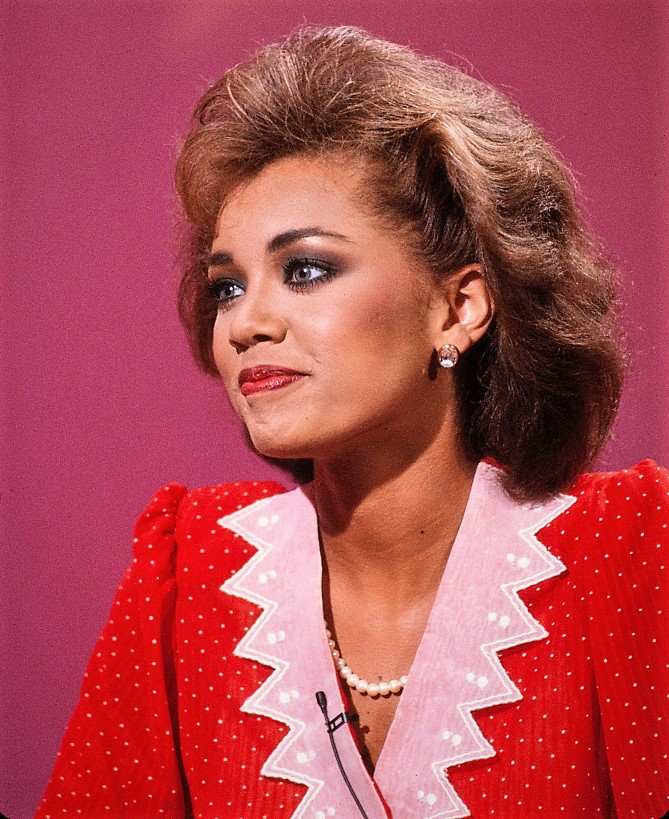
Vanessa Williams,
Miss America 1984 (resigned)

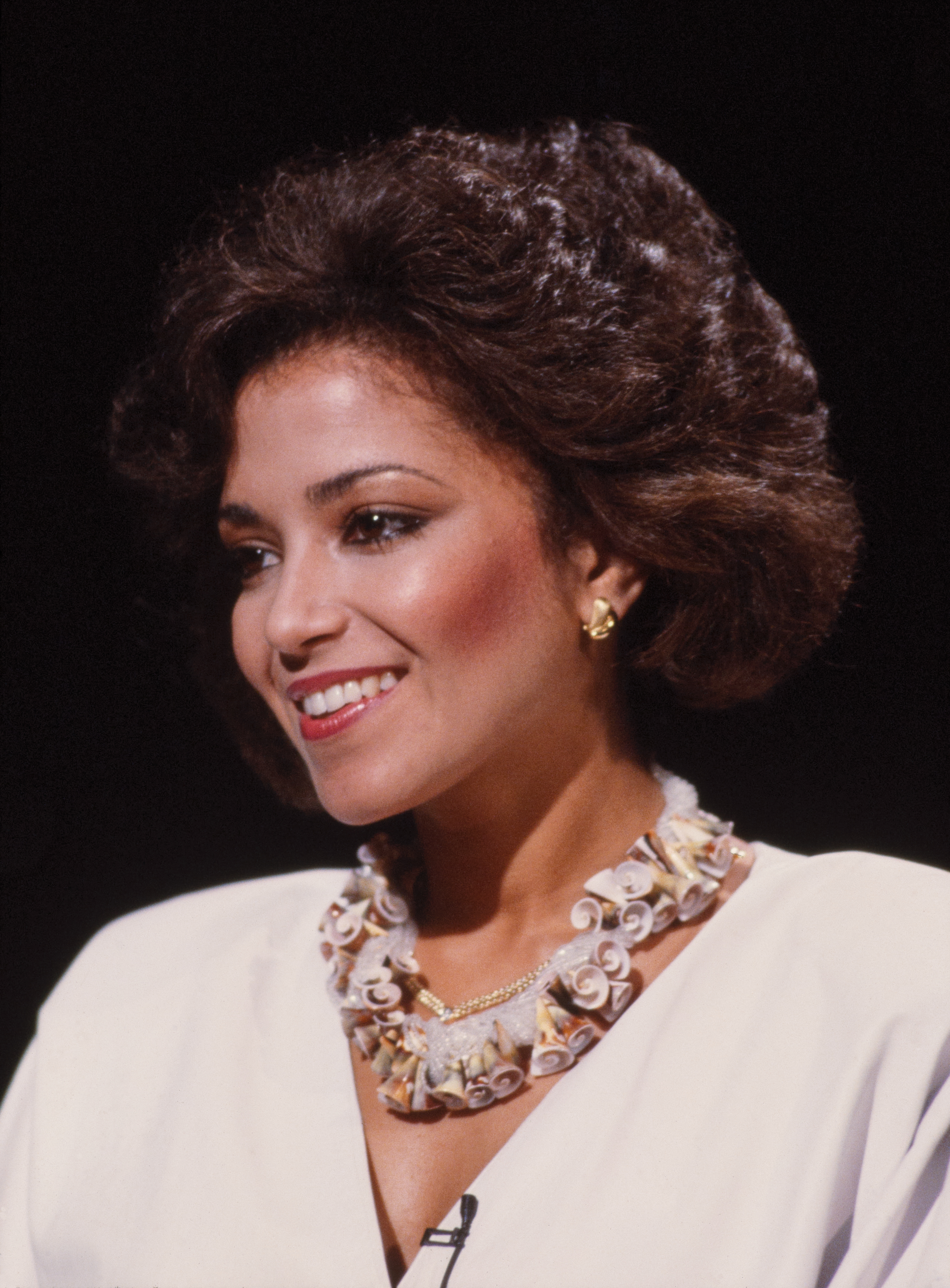
Suzette Charles,
Miss America 1984 (successor)

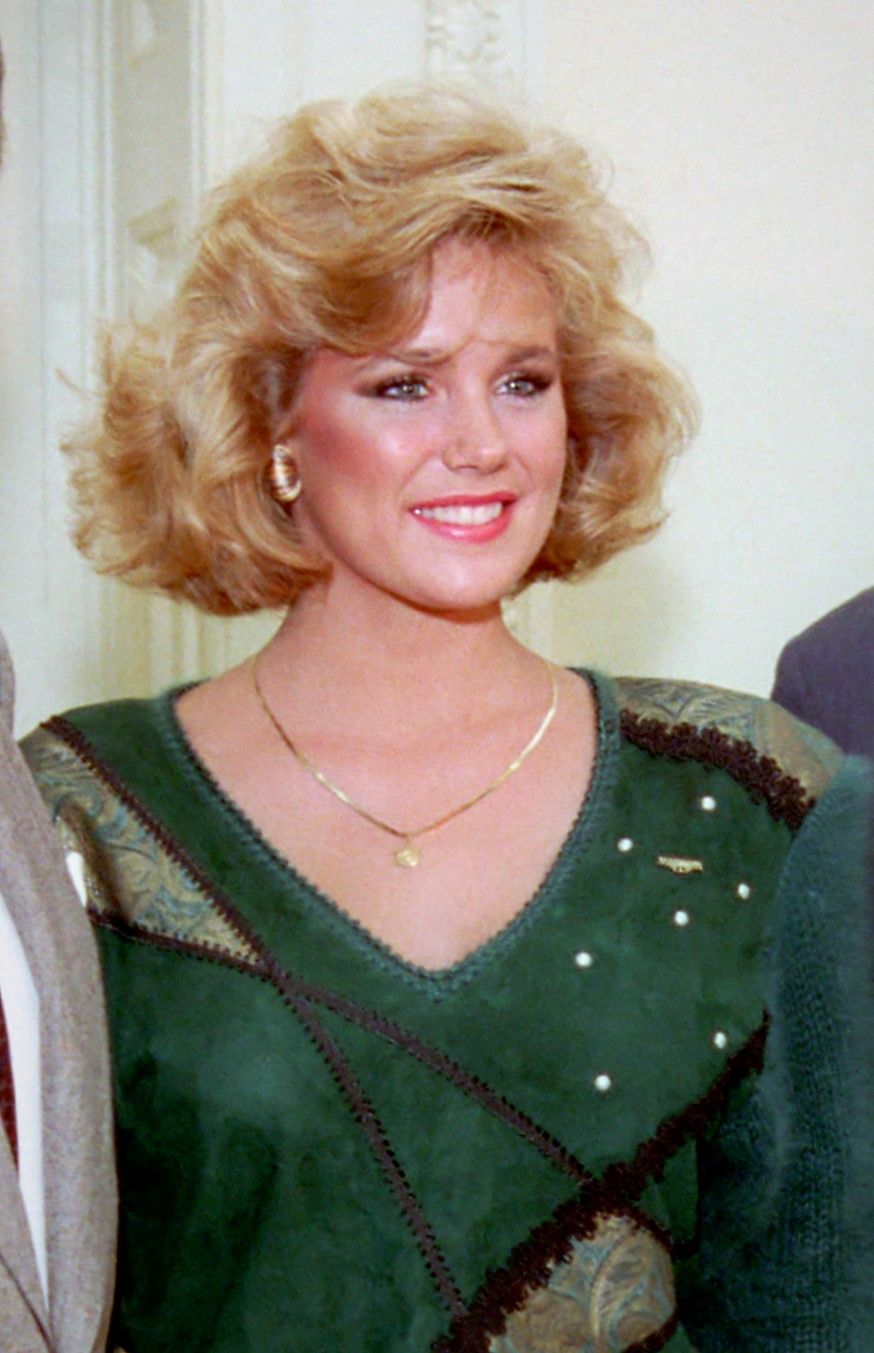
Susan Akin,
Miss America 1986

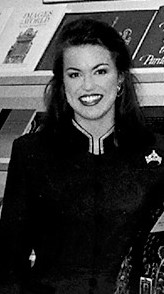
Tara Dawn Holland,
Miss America 1997

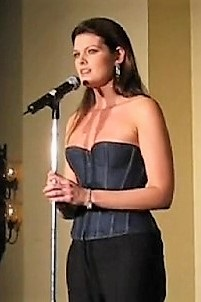
Katherine Shindle,
Miss America 1998

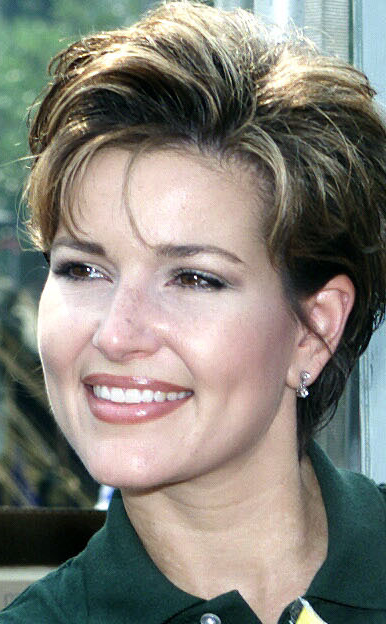
Heather French,
Miss America 2000

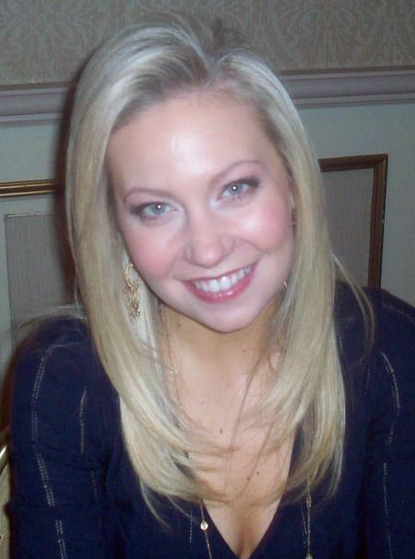
Katie Harman,
Miss America 2002

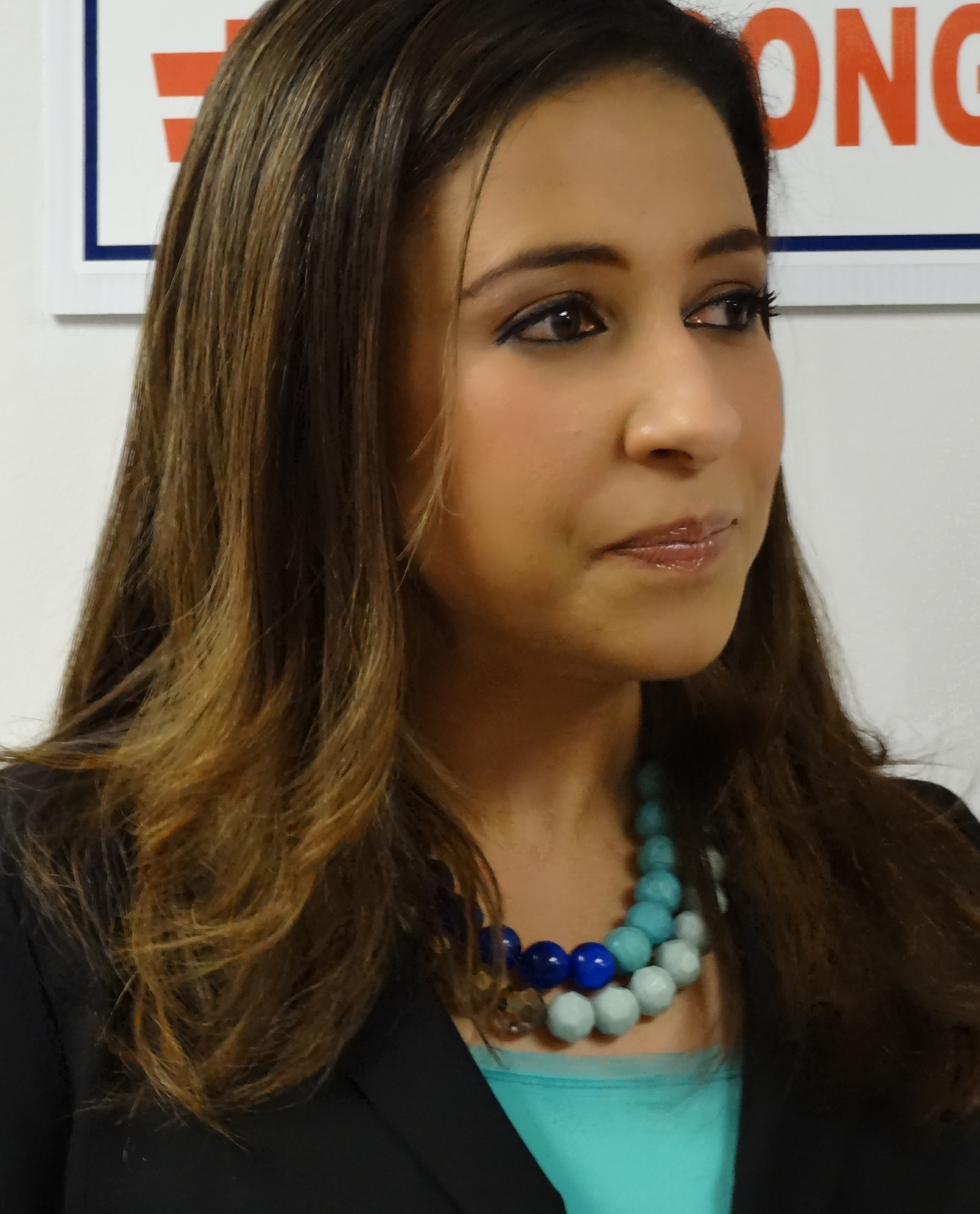
Erika Harold,
Miss America 2003

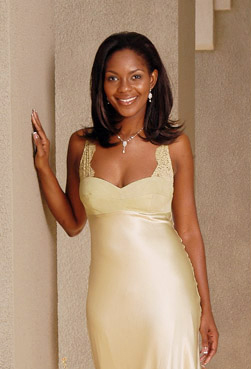
Ericka Dunlap,
Miss America 2004

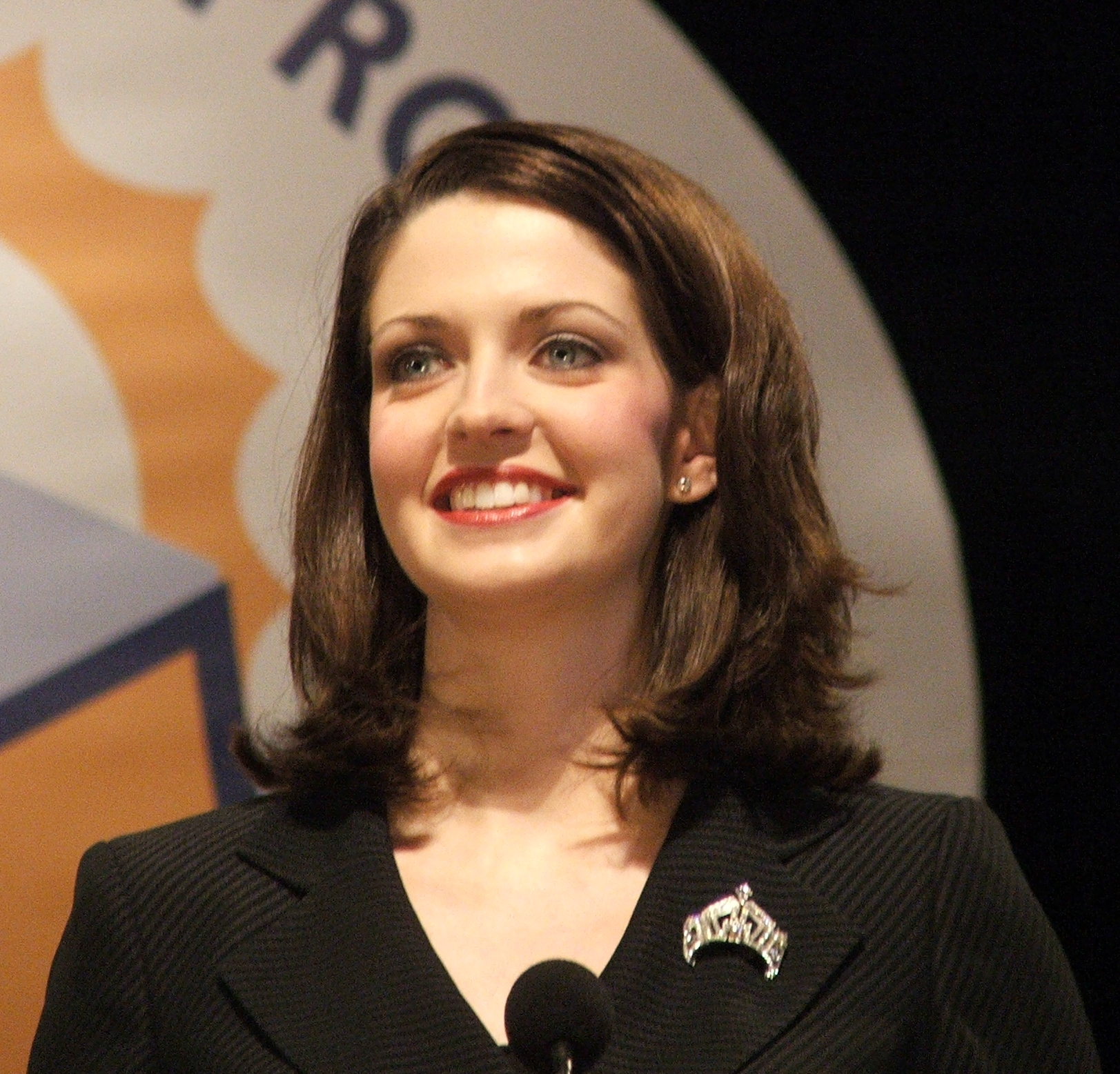
Deidre Downs,
Miss America 2005

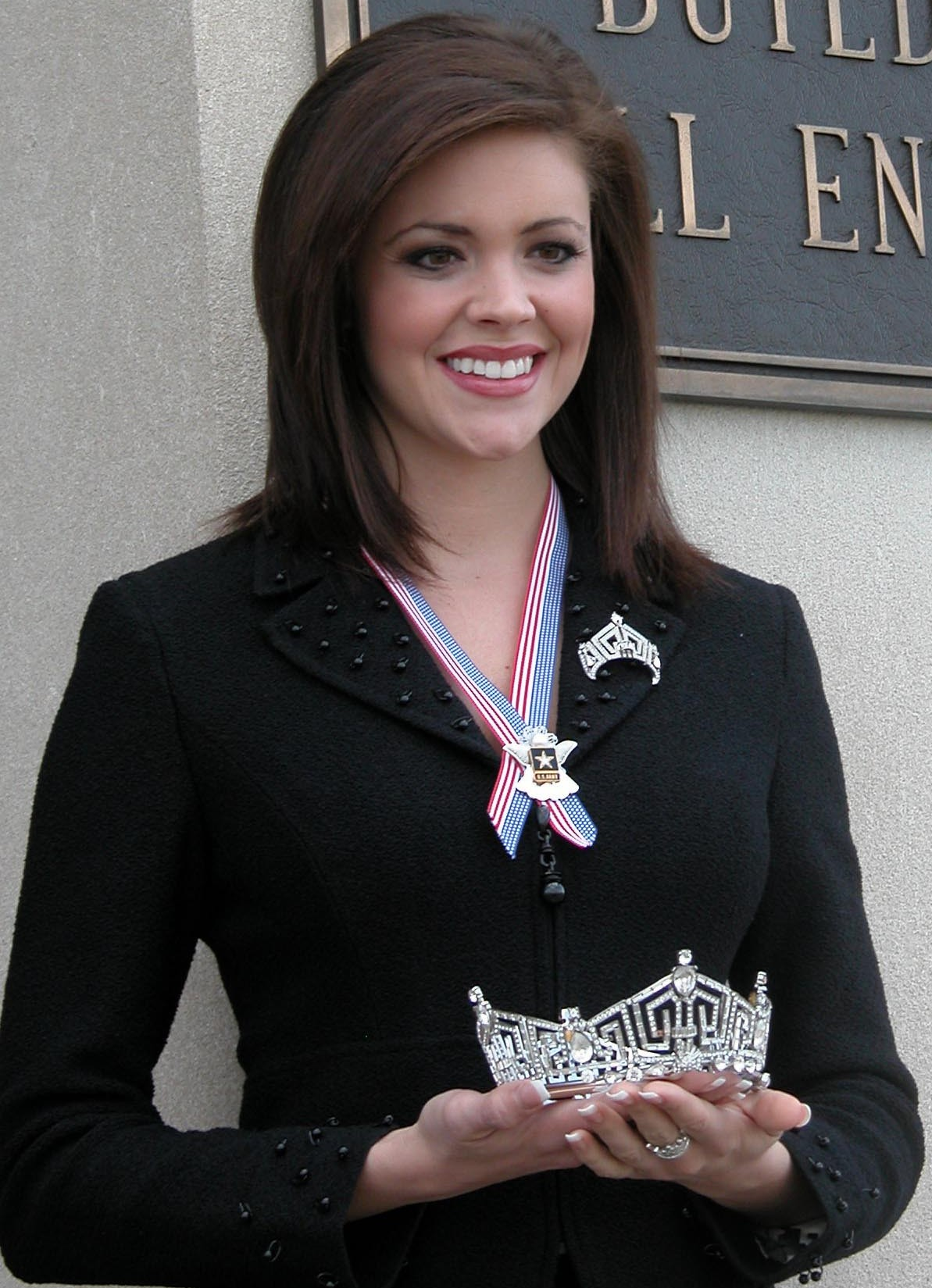
Jennifer Berry,
Miss America 2006

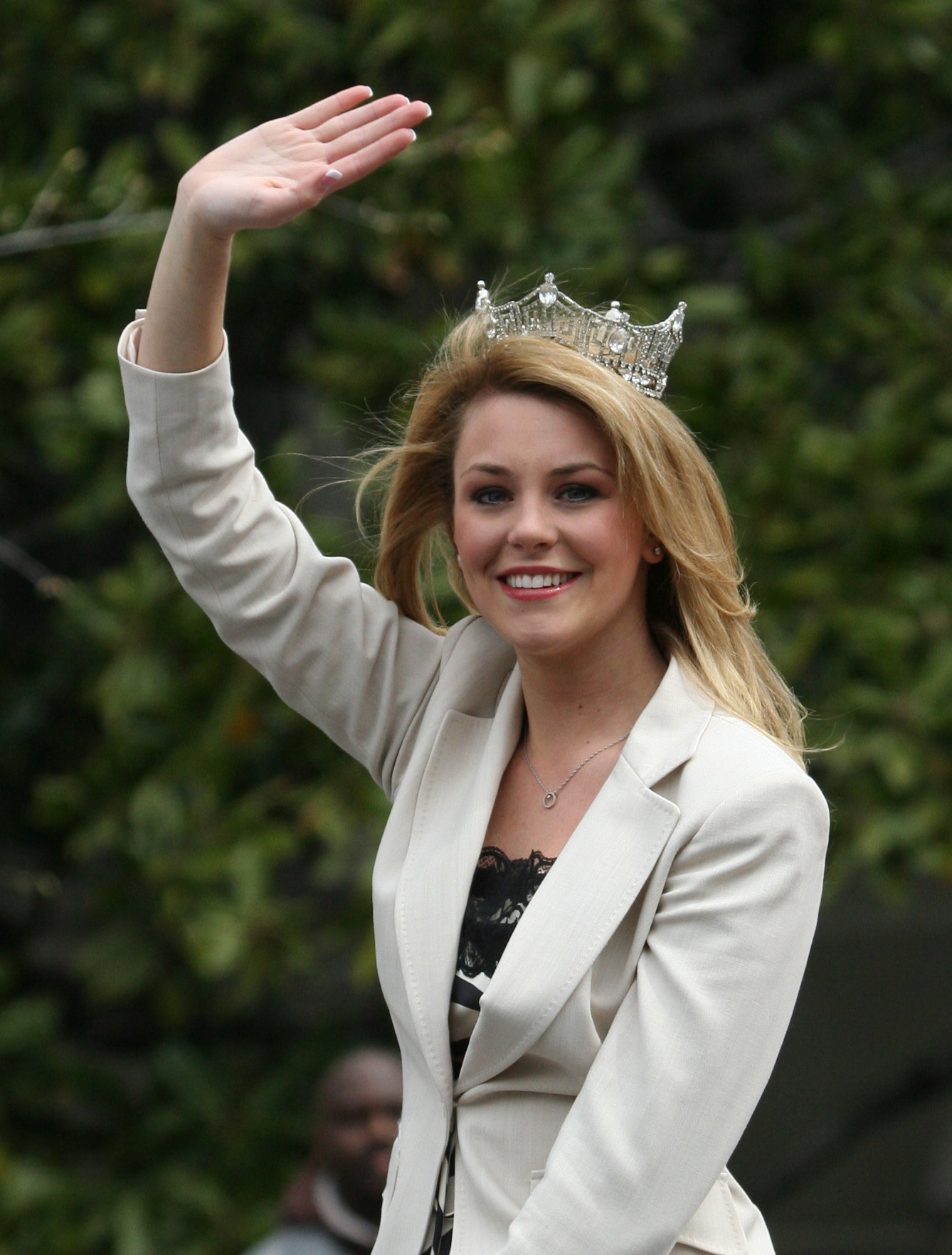
Lauren Nelson,
Miss America 2007

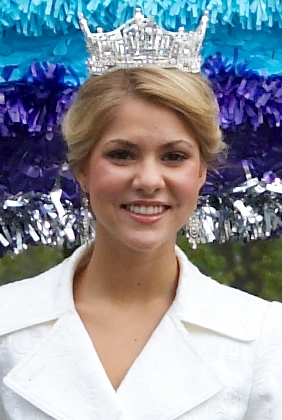
Kirsten Haglund,
Miss America 2008

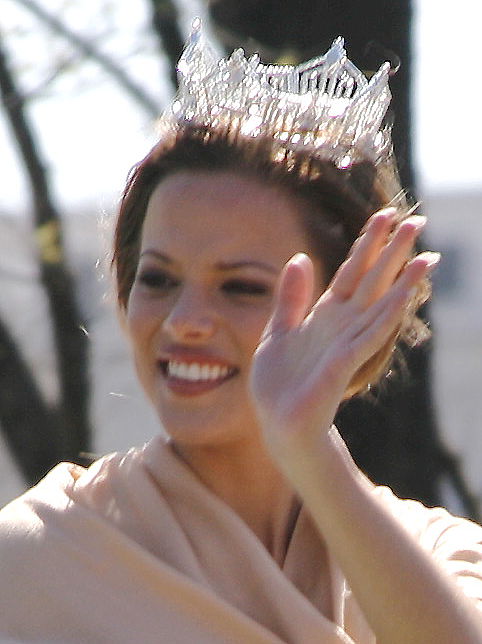
Katie Stam,
Miss America 2009

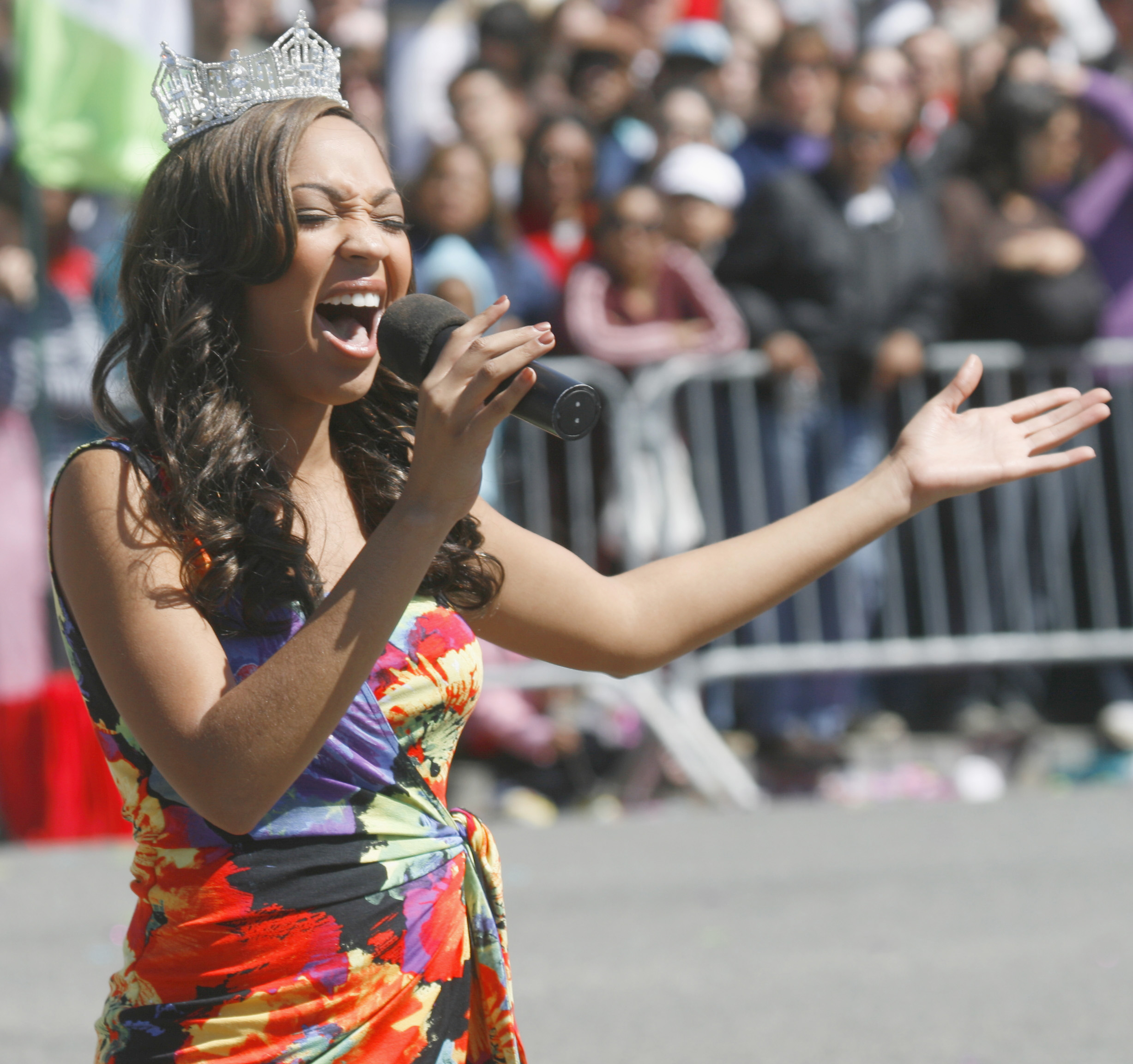
Caressa Cameron,
Miss America 2010

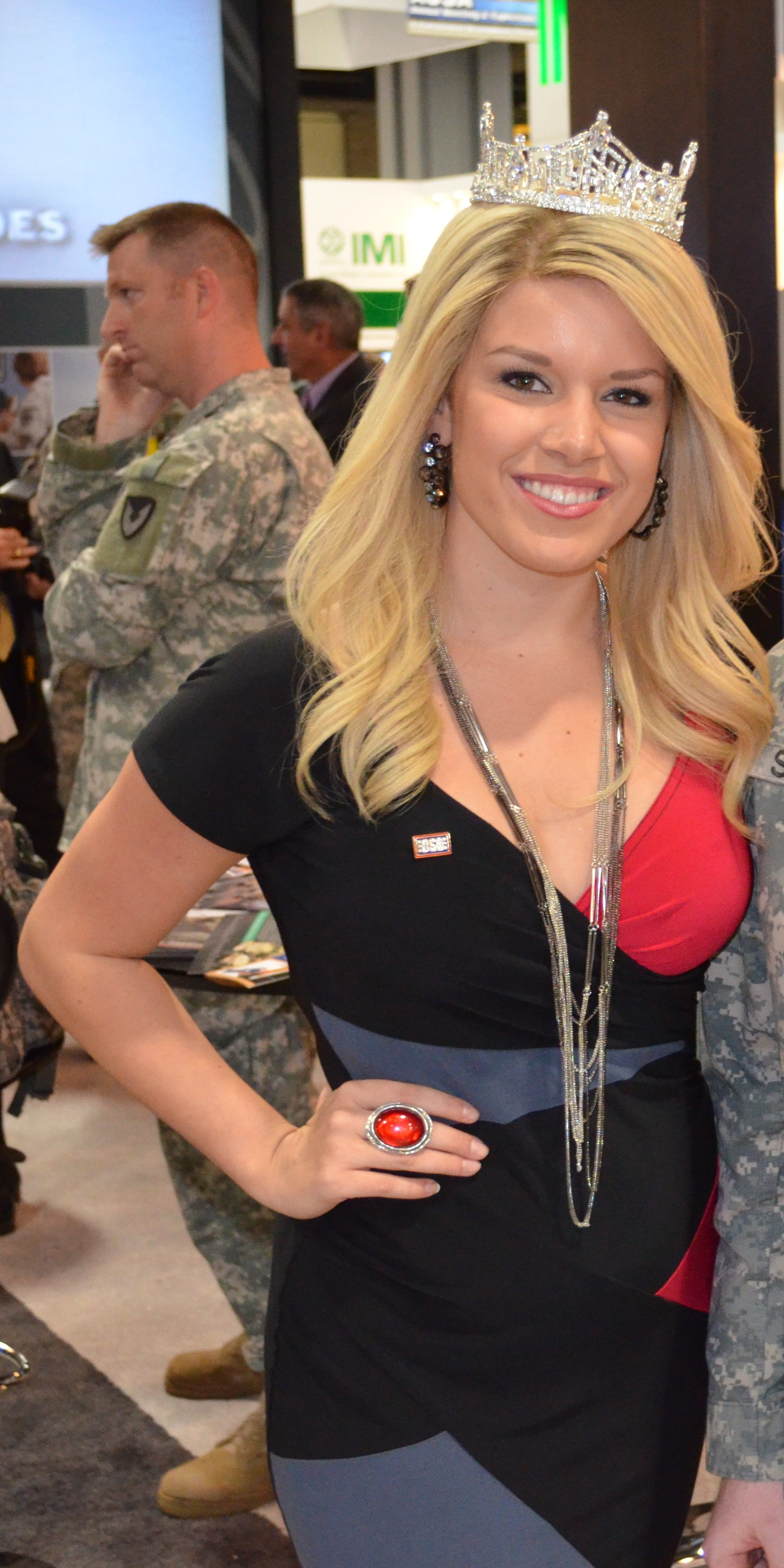
Teresa Scanlan,
Miss America 2011

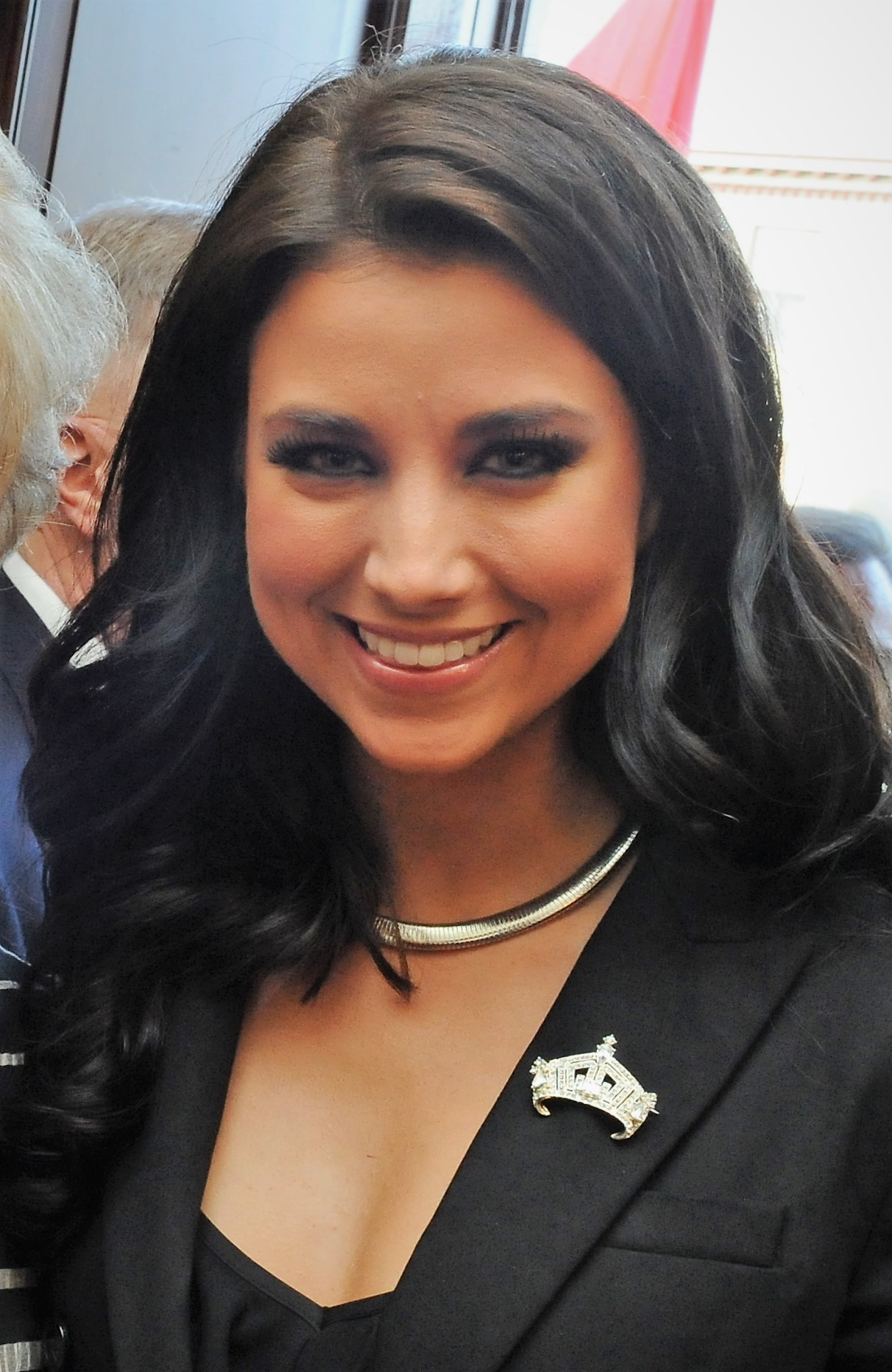
Laura Kaeppeler,
Miss America 2012

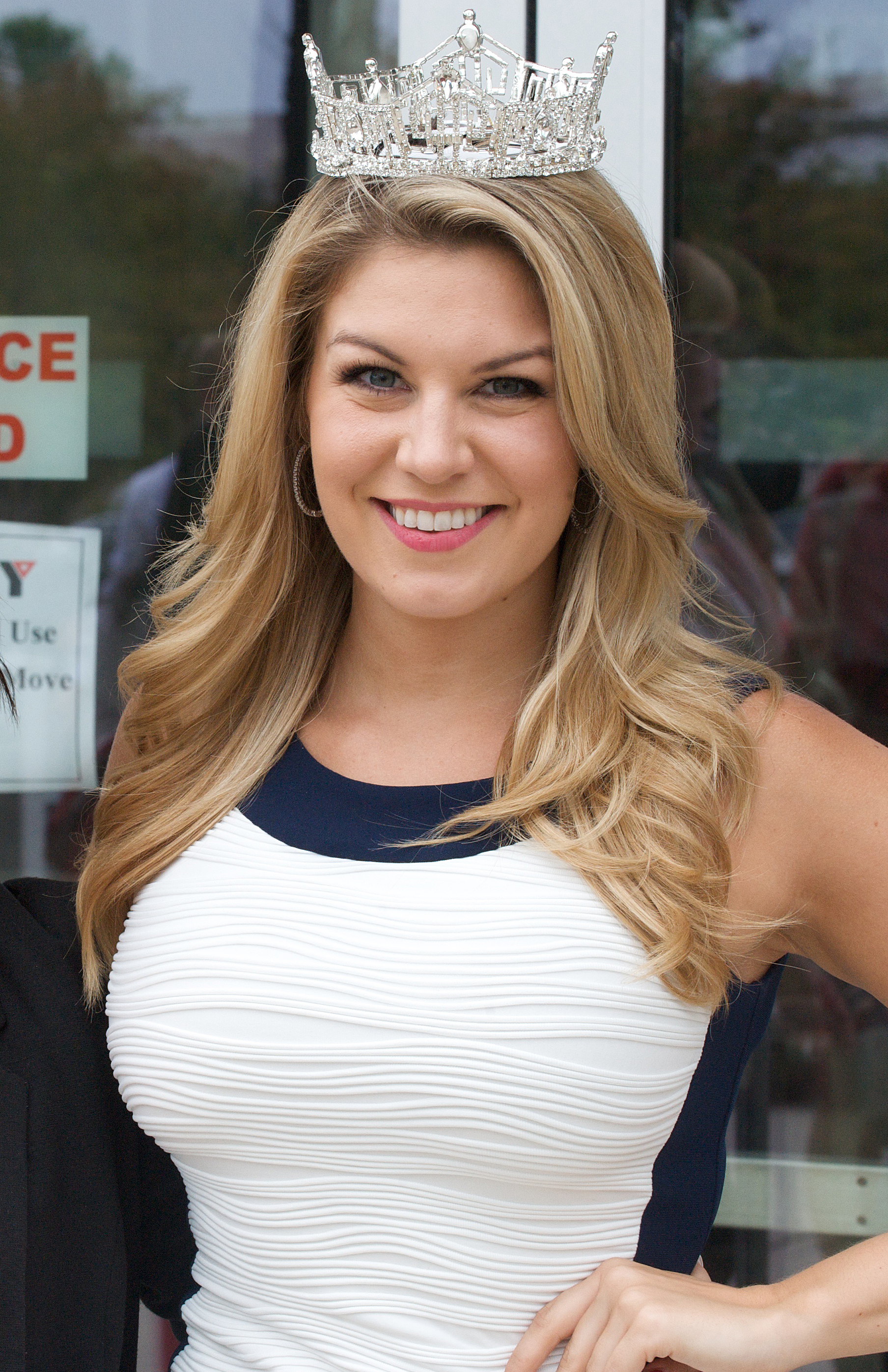
Mallory Hagan,
Miss America 2013

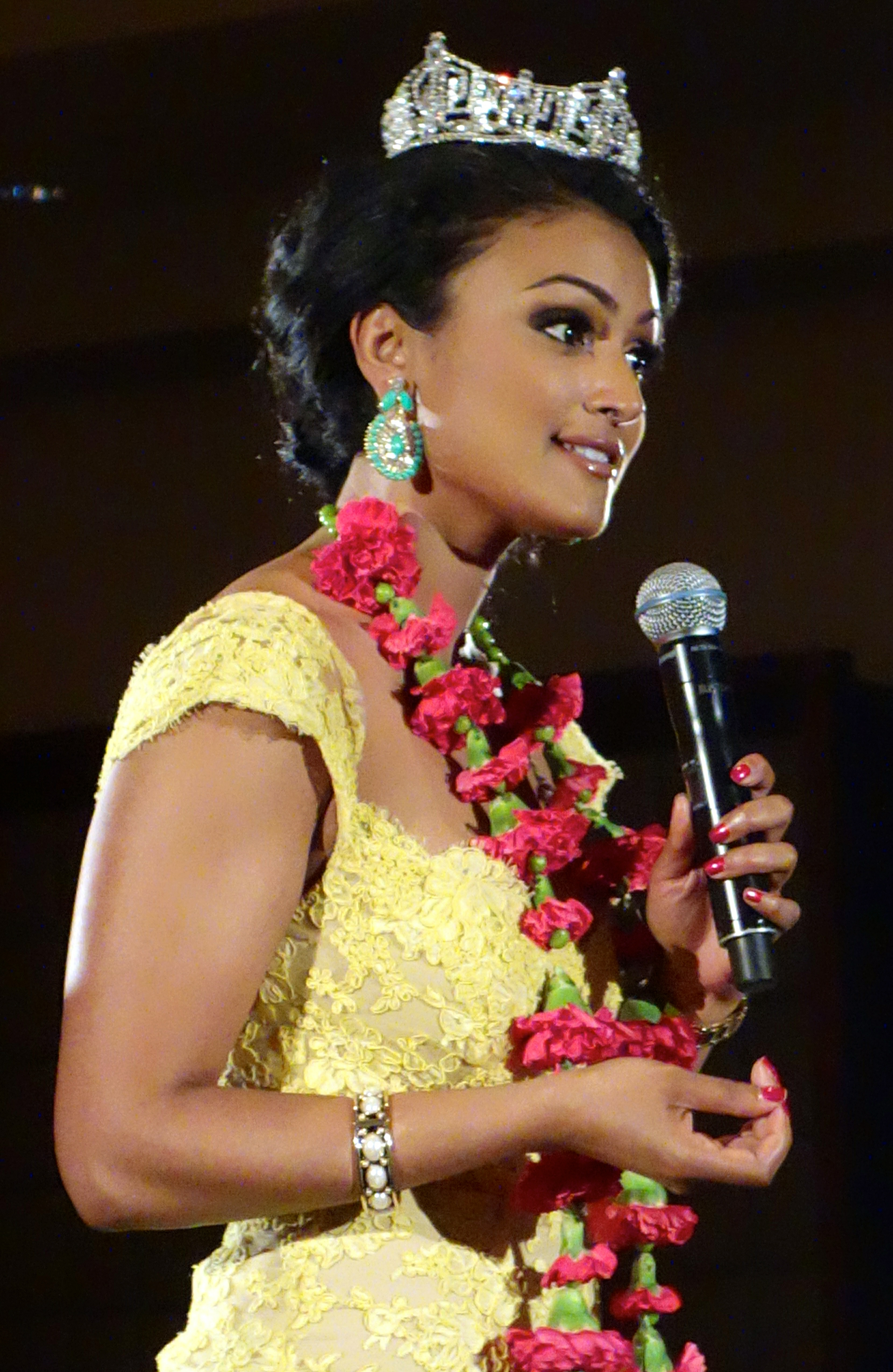
Nina Davuluri,
Miss America 2014

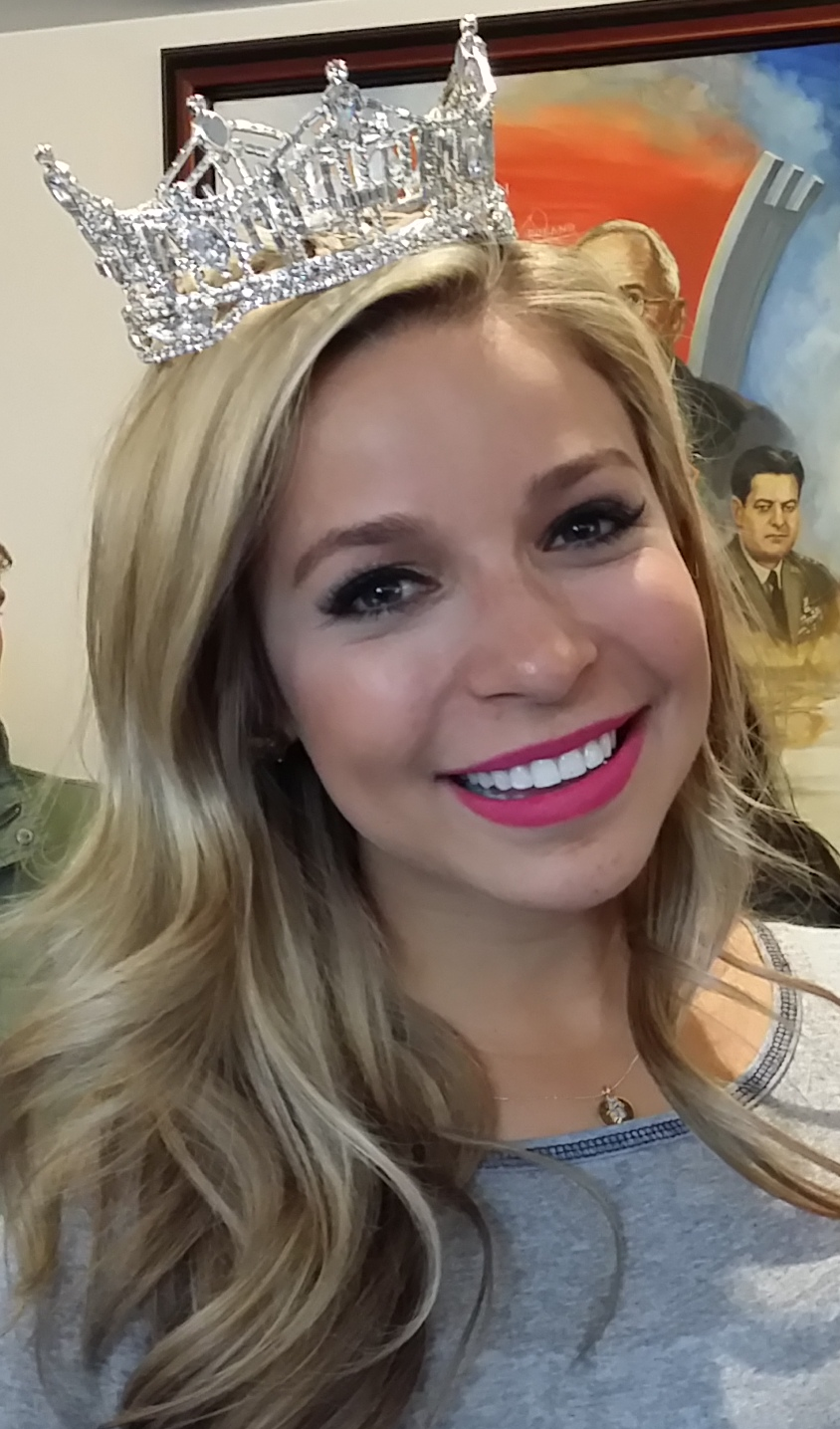
Kira Kazantsev,
Miss America 2015

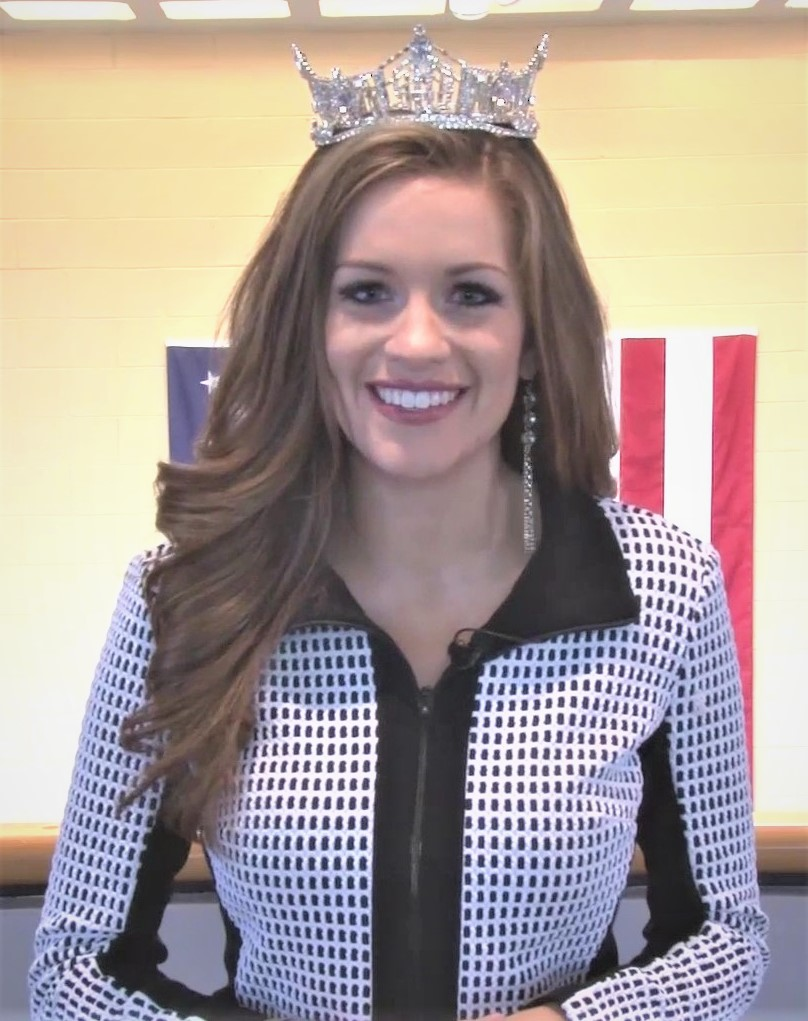
Betty Cantrell,
Miss America 2016

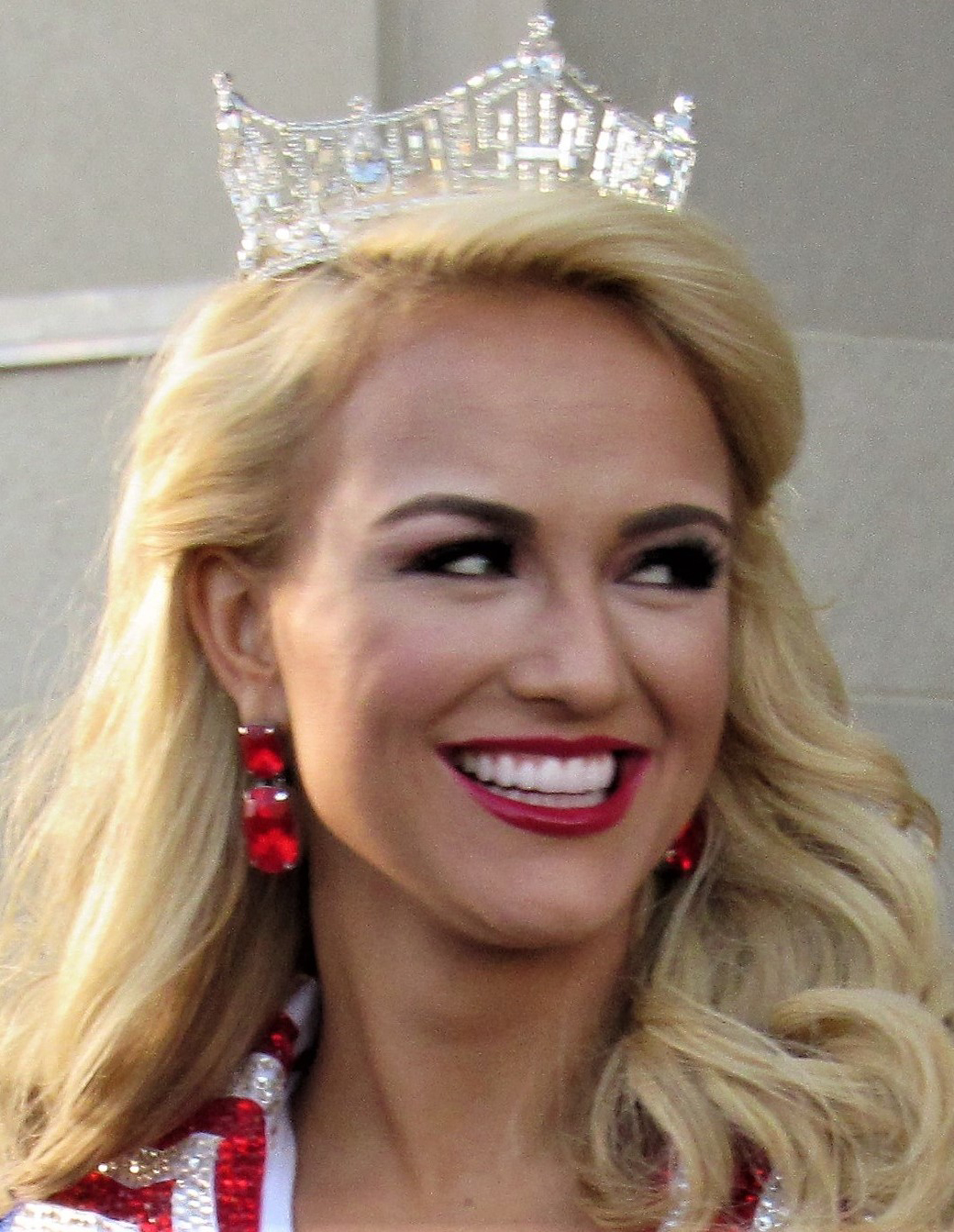
Savvy Shields,
Miss America 2017

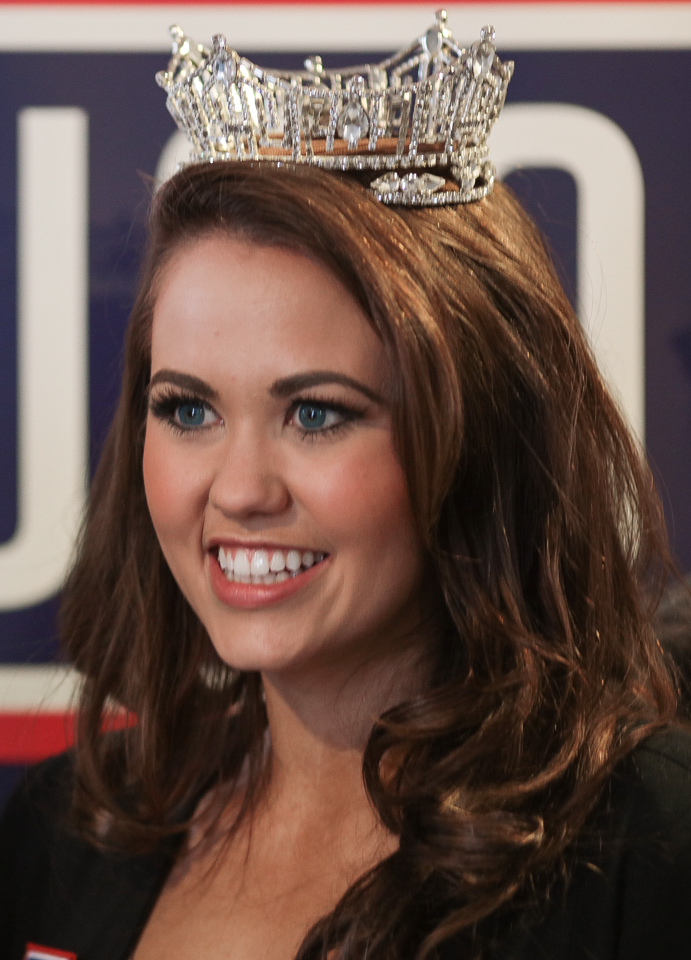
Cara Mund,
Miss America 2018

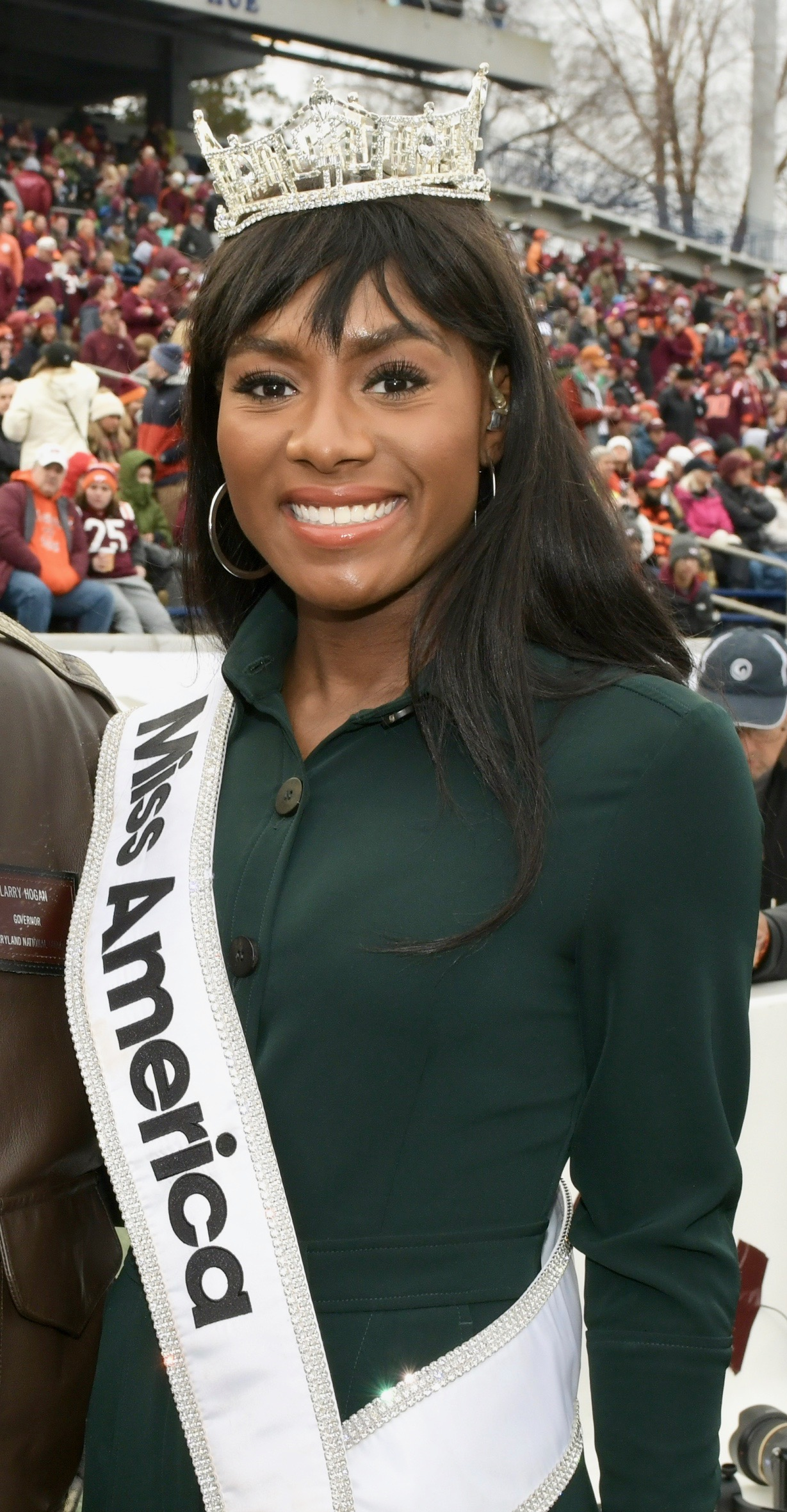
Nia Franklin,
Miss America 2019

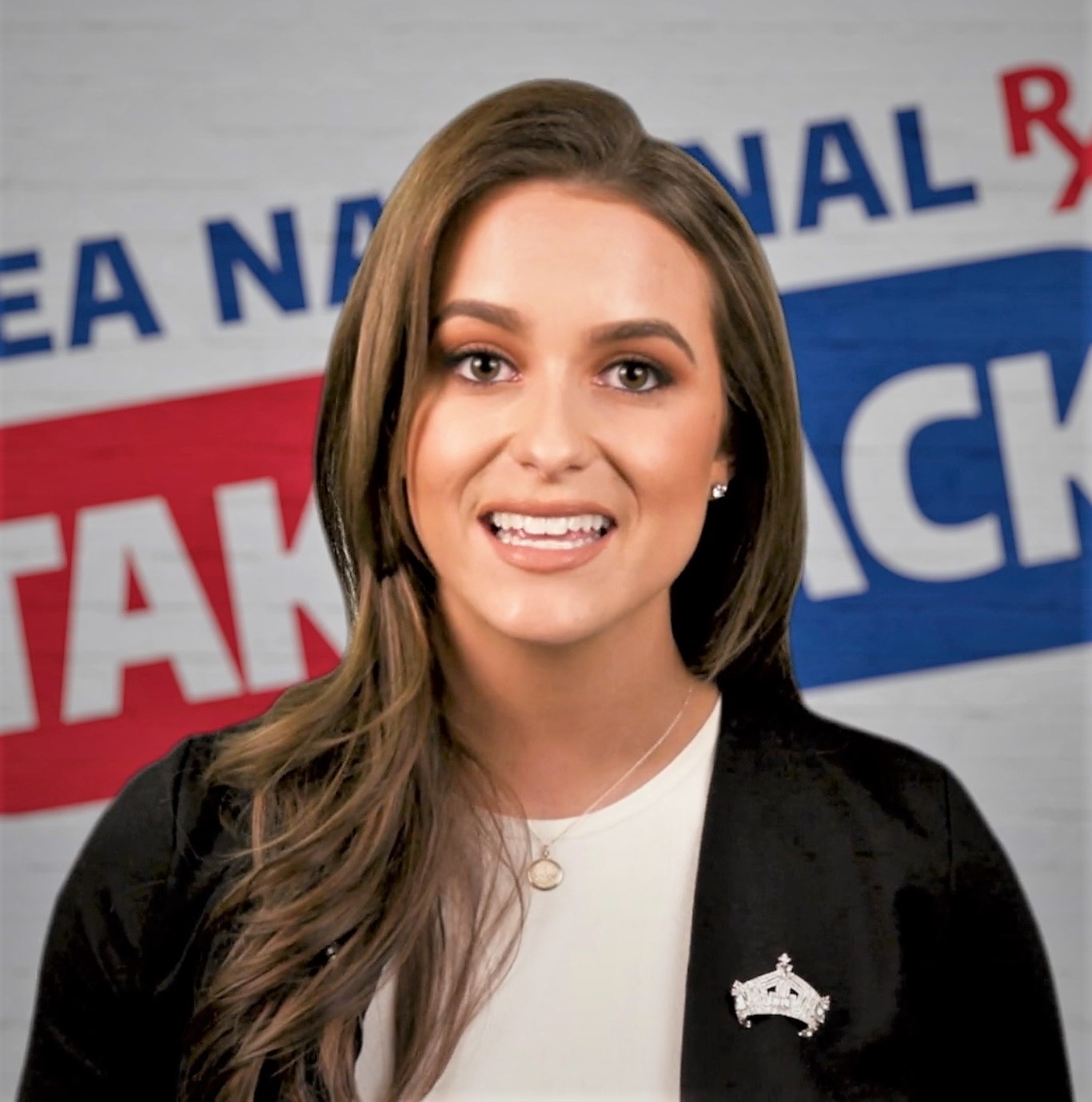
Camille Schrier,
Miss America 2020

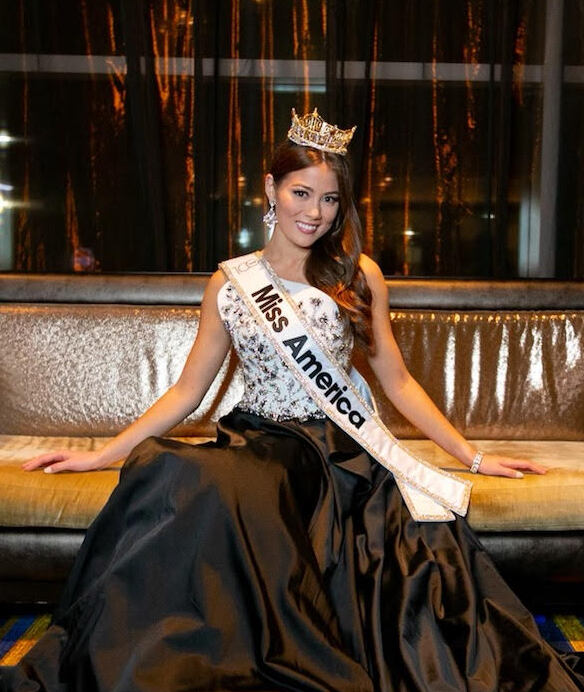
Emma Broyles,
Miss America 2022

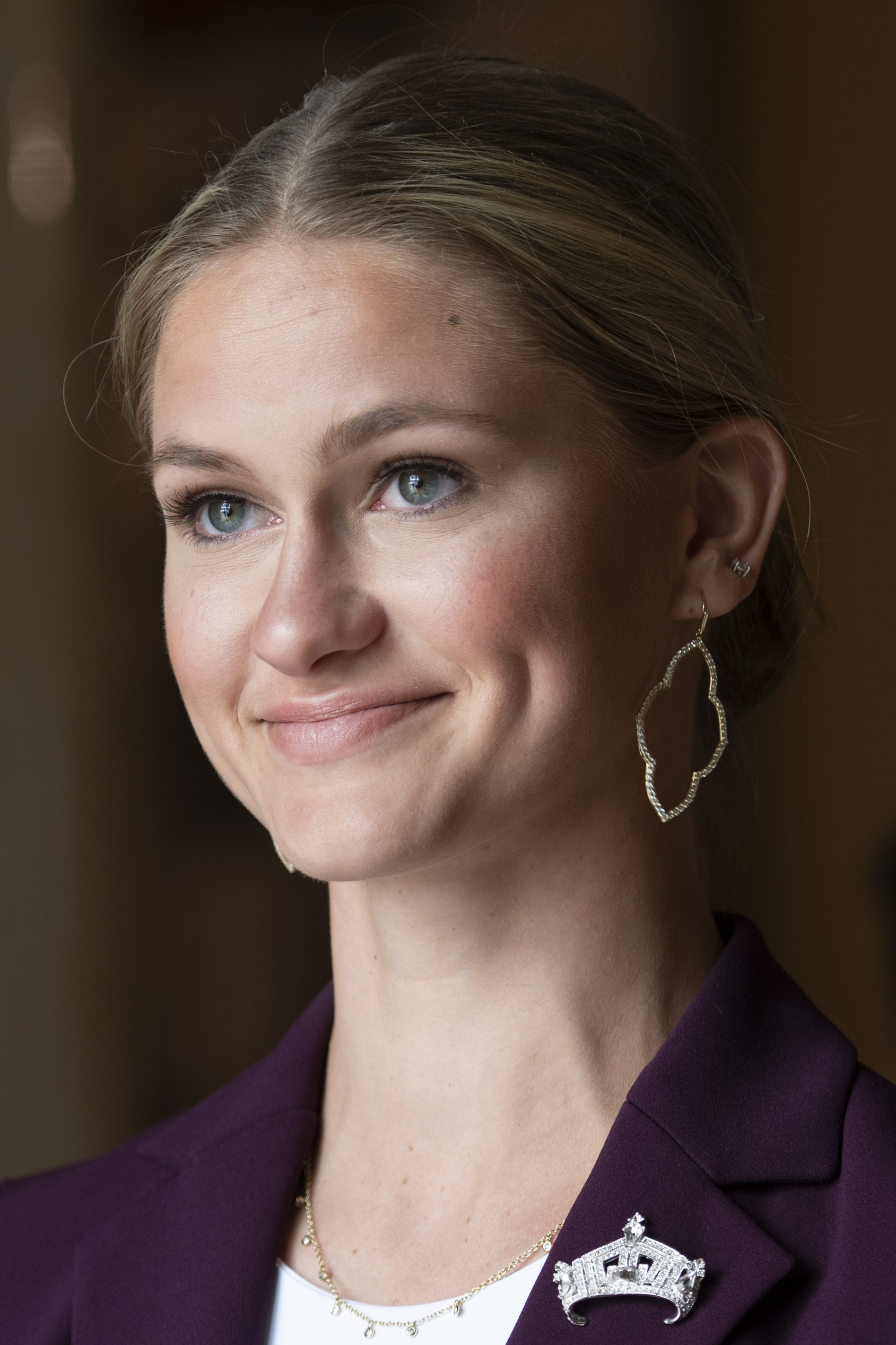
Grace Stanke,
Miss America 2023

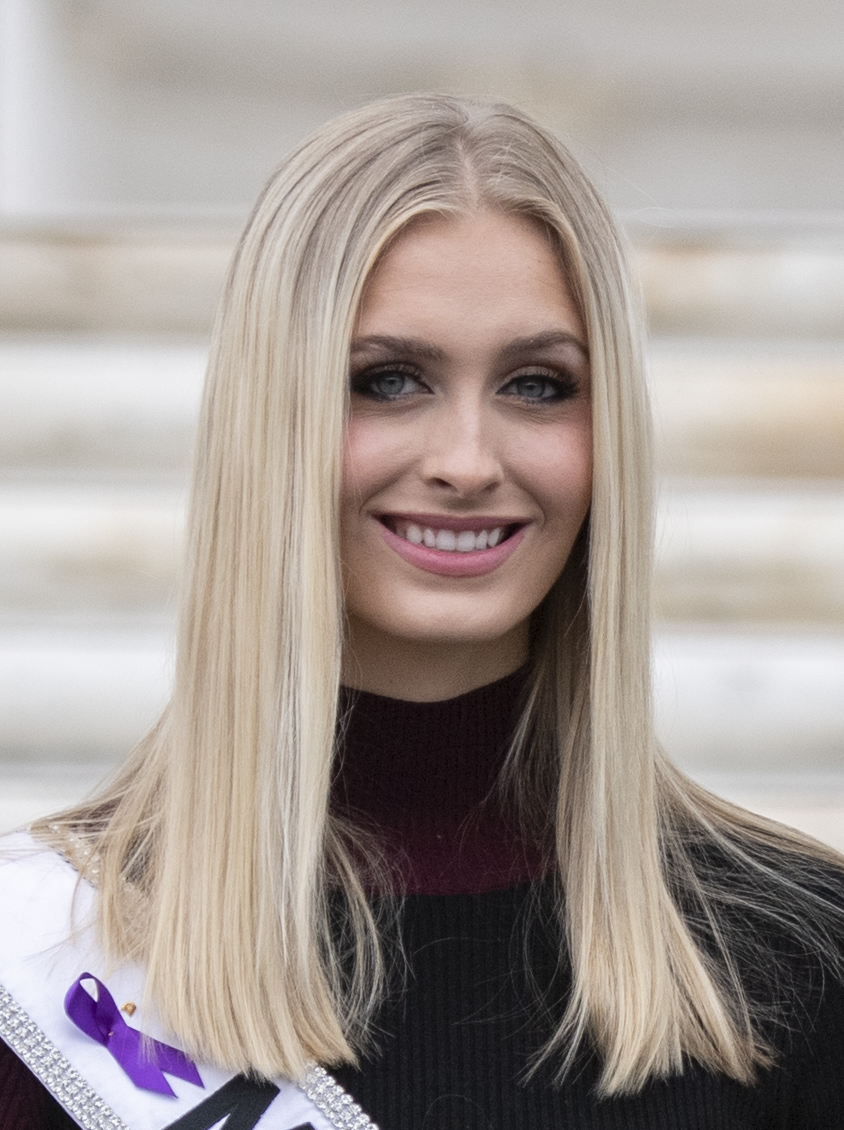
Madison Marsh,
Miss America 2024

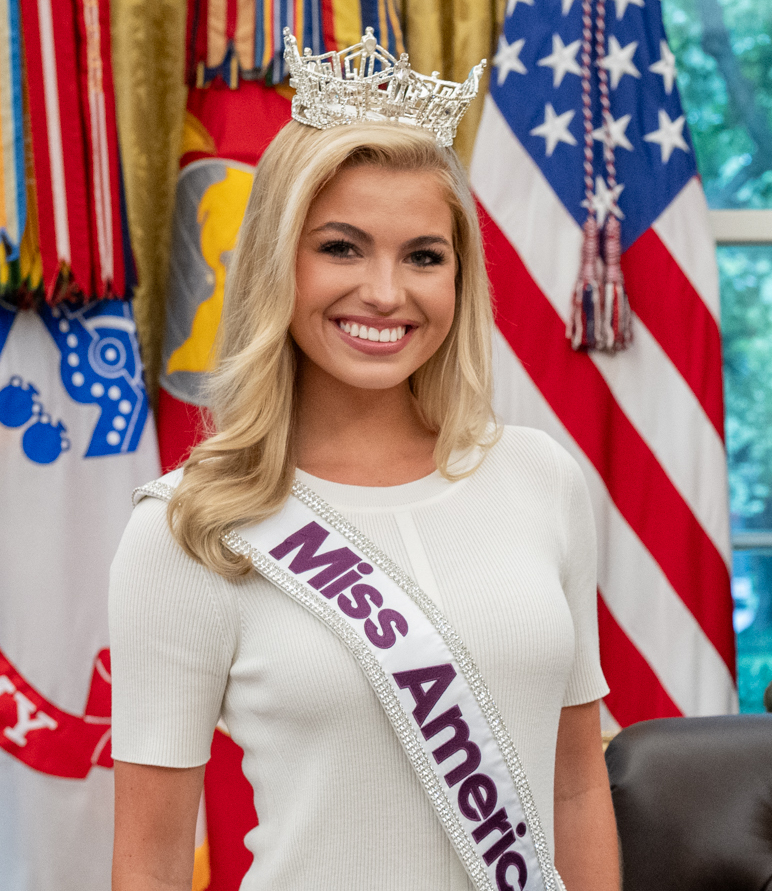
Abbie Stockard,
Miss America 2025

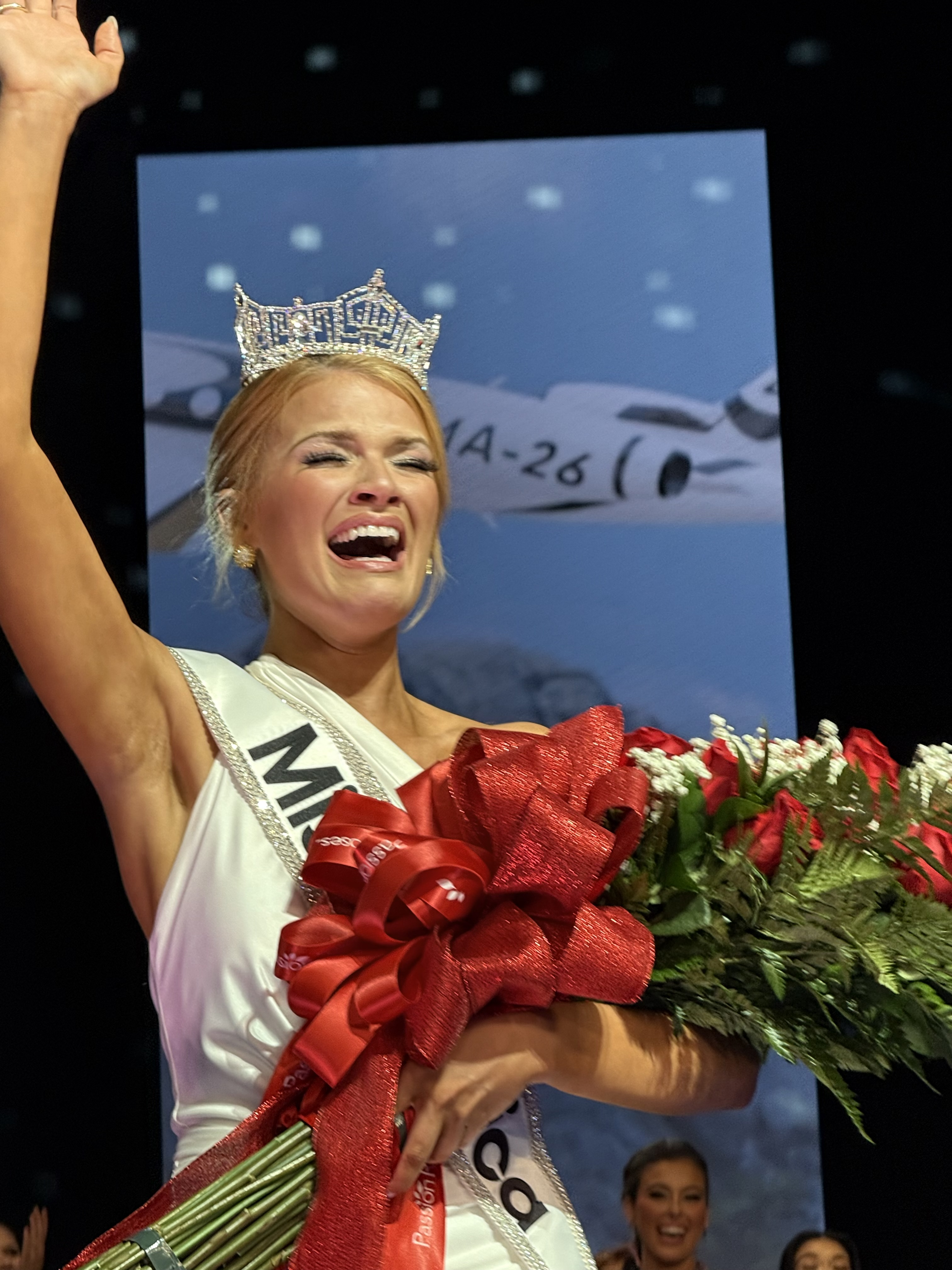
Cassie Donegan,
Miss America 2026

Regan Hutsell,
Miss America 2027

== Winners ==
| Year | Crowned | Winner | State/District | City | Age | Awards | Talent | Notes |
|---|---|---|---|---|---|---|---|---|
| 1921 | Sept. 8, 1921 | Margaret Gorman | (Washington, D.C.) District of Columbia | Washington | 16 | Inter-City Beauty, Amateur | | Earned title of "The Most Beautiful Bathing Girl in America" (pageant renamed "Miss America" in 1922) |
| 1922 | Sept. 7, 1922 | Mary Katherine Campbell | Ohio | Columbus | 16 | | | Only person to win twice; also was 1st runner-up at the 1924 pageant |
| 1923 | Sept. 7, 1923 | Mary Katherine Campbell | Ohio | Columbus | 17 | | | Only person to win twice; also was 1st runner-up at the 1924 pageant |
| 1924 | Sept. 6, 1924 | Ruth Malcomson | Pennsylvania | Philadelphia | 18 | | | |
| 1925 | Sept. 11, 1925 | Fay Lanphier | California | Oakland | 19 | | | |
| 1926 | Sept. 10, 1926 | Norma Smallwood | Oklahoma | Tulsa | 18 | Bather's Revue Winner Evening Gown Award | | |
| 1927 | Sept. 9, 1927 | Lois Delander | Illinois | Joliet | 17 | | | |
| 1928 | No national pageants were held | | | | | | | |
| 1929 | No national pageants were held | | | | | | | |
| 1930 | No national pageants were held | | | | | | | |
| 1931 | No national pageants were held | | | | | | | |
| 1932 | No national pageants were held | | | | | | | |
| 1933 | Sept. 9, 1933 | Marian Bergeron | Connecticut | West Haven | 15 | | | Youngest winner in history at the age of 15½ Held title for two years since no competition was held in 1934 |
| 1934 | No national pageant was held | | | | | | | |
| 1935 | Sept. 7, 1935 | Henrietta Leaver | Pennsylvania | Pittsburgh | 17 | | Vocal / Tap dance, "Living In a Great Big Way" | |
| 1936 | Sept. 12, 1936 | Rose Coyle | Pennsylvania | Philadelphia | 22 | Preliminary Talent | Vocal / Tap dance, "I Can't Escape From You" & "Truckin'" | |
| 1937 | Sept. 11, 1937 | Bette Cooper | New Jersey | Bertrand Island | 17 | Evening Gown Award | Vocal, "When the Poppies Bloom Again" | |
| 1938 | Sept. 10, 1938 | Marilyn Meseke | Ohio | Marion | 21 | | Tap dance, "The World Is Waiting for the Sunrise" | Held the title of Miss Ohio twice (1931 & 1938) |
| 1939 | Sept. 9, 1939 | Patricia Donnelly | Michigan | Detroit | 19 | | Vocal / Bass Fiddle, "To You" & "Ol' Man Mose" | |
| 1940 | Sept. 7, 1940 | Frances Marie Burke | Pennsylvania | Philadelphia | 19 | Preliminary Swimsuit | Vocal / Dance, "I Can't Love You Anymore" | |
| 1941 | Sept. 6, 1941 | Rosemary LaPlanche | California | Los Angeles | 18 | Preliminary Swimsuit | Dance | Also placed 1st runner-up at Miss America 1940 pageant |
| 1942 | Sept. 12, 1942 | Jo-Carroll Dennison | Texas | Tyler | 18 | Preliminary Swimsuit Preliminary Talent | Vocal / Dance, "Deep in the Heart of Texas" | |
| 1943 | Sept. 11, 1943 | Jean Bartel | California | Los Angeles | 19 | Preliminary Swimsuit Preliminary Talent | Vocal, "Night and Day" | |
| 1944 | Sept. 9, 1944 | Venus Ramey | (Washington, D.C.) District of Columbia | Washington | 19 | Preliminary Swimsuit Preliminary Talent | Vocal / Dance, "Take It Easy" | |
| 1945 | Sept. 8, 1945 | Bess Myerson | (New York (state)) New York | New York City | 21 | Preliminary Swimsuit Preliminary Talent | Piano & flute, "Piano Concerto In A Minor" by Edvard Grieg & "Summertime" | First Jewish-American Miss America First Miss New York crowned |
| 1946 | Sept. 7, 1946 | Marilyn Buferd | California | Los Angeles | 21 | Preliminary Swimsuit Preliminary Talent (tie) | Dramatic monologue, Accent on Youth | |
| 1947 | Sept. 6, 1947 | Barbara Jo Walker | Tennessee | Memphis | 21 | Preliminary Talent | Art display & vocal medley, "One Kiss" & "Un Bel Di" from Madama Butterfly | |
| 1948 | Sept. 11, 1948 | BeBe Shopp | Minnesota | Hopkins | 18 | Preliminary Swimsuit | Vibraharp, "Caprice Viennois" by Fritz Kreisler | |
| 1949 | Sept. 10, 1949 | Jacque Mercer | Arizona | Litchfield Park | 18 | Preliminary Swimsuit (tie) Preliminary Talent | Dramatic reading, Romeo and Juliet | |
| 1951 (Note: No "Miss America 1950" was officially crowned. Since the majority of each titleholder's reign occurred during the following year, the organization began referring to titleholder using upcoming year.) | Sept. 9, 1950 | Yolande Betbeze | Alabama | Mobile | 21 | Preliminary Swimsuit | Classical vocal, "Caro Nome" from Rigoletto | Sparked the creation of the Miss USA and Miss Universe pageants |
| 1952 | Sept. 8, 1951 | Colleen Kay Hutchins | Utah | Salt Lake City | 25 | Preliminary Talent | Dramatic monologue, "Elizabeth the Queen" by Maxwell Anderson | |
| 1953 | Sept. 6, 1952 | Neva Jane Langley | (Georgia (U.S. state)) Georgia | Macon | 19 | Preliminary Swimsuit Preliminary Talent | Classical piano, "Toccata" | |
| 1954 | Sept. 12, 1953 | Evelyn Ay | Pennsylvania | Ephrata | 20 | Preliminary Swimsuit | Poetry recitation, "Footsteps" from Leaves from a Grass-House by Don Blanding | |
| 1955 | Sept. 11, 1954 | Lee Meriwether | California | San Francisco | 19 | Preliminary Swimsuit | Dramatic monologue, Riders to the Sea | First winner crowned on television. Television broadcast moved to ABC Became an actress, starring in Batman and Barnaby Jones |
| 1956 | Sept. 10, 1955 | Sharon Ritchie | Colorado | Denver | 18 | | Recitation, "The Murder of Lidice" by Edna St. Vincent Millay | |
| 1957 | Sept. 8, 1956 | Marian McKnight | South Carolina | Manning | 19 | | Comedy sketch, "The Monroe Doctrine" | |
| 1958 | Sept. 7, 1957 | Marilyn Van Derbur | Colorado | Denver | 20 | | Organ, "Tea for Two" & "Tenderly" | Television broadcast moved to CBS |
| 1959 | Sept. 6, 1958 | Mary Ann Mobley | Mississippi | Brandon | 21 | Preliminary Talent | Vocal medley & dance, "Un Bel Di" & "There'll Be Some Changes Made" | Became a television actress (seen on Diff'rent Strokes) and hostess |
| 1960 | Sept. 12, 1959 | Lynda Lee Mead | Mississippi | Natchez | 20 | | Original dramatic act, "Schizophrenia" | |
| 1961 | Sept. 10, 1960 | Nancy Fleming | Michigan | Montague | 18 | Preliminary Swimsuit Preliminary Talent (tie) | Presentation of dress design | |
| 1962 | Sept. 9, 1961 | Maria Fletcher | North Carolina | Asheville | 19 | Preliminary Swimsuit | Vocal/tap dance, "Somebody Loves Me" | First Miss North Carolina crowned |
| 1963 | Sept. 8, 1962 | Jacquelyn Mayer | Ohio | Sandusky | 20 | | Broadway medley, "Wishing Upon a Star," "My Favorite Things" & The White Cliffs of Dover | |
| 1964 | Sept. 7, 1963 | Donna Axum | Arkansas | El Dorado | 21 | Preliminary Swimsuit | Vocal medley, "Quando me'n vo'" & "I Love Paris" | |
| 1965 | Sept. 12, 1964 | Vonda Kay Van Dyke | Arizona | Phoenix | 21 | Miss Congeniality | Ventriloquism, "Together (Wherever We Go)" | Only Miss Congeniality winner to be also crowned Miss America |
| 1966 | Sept. 11, 1965 | Deborah Bryant | Kansas | Overland Park | 19 | Preliminary Swimsuit | Dramatic interpretation, "The Miserable Miserliness of Midas Moneybags" | |
| 1967 | Sept. 10, 1966 | Jane Anne Jayroe | Oklahoma | Laverne | 19 | Preliminary Talent | Vocal / Orchestral conducting, "1-2-3" | Television broadcast moved to NBC |
| 1968 | Sept. 9, 1967 | Debra Dene Barnes | Kansas | Moran | 20 | Preliminary Swimsuit | Piano, "Born Free" | |
| 1969 | Sept. 7, 1968 | Judith Ford | Illinois | Belvidere | 18 | Preliminary Swimsuit Preliminary Talent | Acrobatic dance & trampoline, "The Blue Danube" | |
| 1970 | Sept. 6, 1969 | Pamela Eldred | Michigan | West Bloomfield | 21 | Preliminary Swimsuit | Ballet, "Love Theme" from Romeo & Juliet | |
| 1971 | Sept. 12, 1970 | Phyllis George | Texas | Denton | 21 | Preliminary Swimsuit | Piano medley, Promises, Promises & "Raindrops Keep Fallin' on My Head" | Former sportscaster on CBS in 1970s and 1980s Former First Lady of Kentucky (1979–83) |
| 1972 | Sept. 11, 1971 | Laurie Lea Schaefer | Ohio | Bexley | 22 | Preliminary Swimsuit | Semi-classical vocal, "And This Is My Beloved" | |
| 1973 | Sept. 9, 1972 | Terry Meeuwsen | Wisconsin | De Pere | 23 | Preliminary Swimsuit Preliminary Talent | Vocal, "He Touched Me" from Drat! The Cat! | First Miss Wisconsin crowned Co-host of The 700 Club |
| 1974 | Sept. 8, 1973 | Rebecca King | Colorado | Denver | 23 | | Vocal, "If I Ruled the World" | Mother of Miss Colorado 2011, Diana Dremen |
| 1975 | Sept. 7, 1974 | Shirley Cothran | Texas | Denton | 21 | Preliminary Swimsuit | Flute medley, "Bumble Boogie" & "Swingin' Shepherd Blues" | |
| 1976 | Sept. 6, 1975 | Tawny Godin | (New York (state)) New York | Yonkers | 18 | | Original piano composition, "Images in Pastels" | |
| 1977 | Sept. 11, 1976 | Dorothy Benham | Minnesota | Edina | 20 | Preliminary Swimsuit Preliminary Talent | Classical vocal, "Adele's Laughing Song" from Die Fledermaus | Appeared in Jerome Robbins' Broadway |
| 1978 | Sept. 10, 1977 | Susan Perkins | Ohio | Middletown | 23 | Preliminary Talent | Vocal, "Good Morning Heartache" | Television broadcast moved to CBS |
| 1979 | Sept. 9, 1978 | Kylene Barker | Virginia | Galax | 22 | | Gymnastics routine, "Gonna Fly Now" & "Feels So Good" | Television broadcast moved to NBC |
| 1980 | Sept. 8, 1979 | Cheryl Prewitt | Mississippi | Ackerman | 22 | Preliminary Swimsuit | Vocal / Piano, "Don't Cry Out Loud" | |
| 1981 | Sept. 6, 1980 | Susan Powell | Oklahoma | Elk City | 21 | Preliminary Talent (tie) | Classical vocal, "The Telephone Aria" | |
| 1982 | Sept. 12, 1981 | Elizabeth Ward | Arkansas | Russellville | 20 | Preliminary Swimsuit | Vocal, "After You've Gone" | Previously National Sweetheart 1981 Infamously claimed to have had short-lived affair with President Bill Clinton while he was Governor of Arkansas |
| 1983 | Sept. 11, 1982 | Debra Maffett | California | Anaheim | 25 | Preliminary Swimsuit Preliminary Talent | Popular Vocal, "Come in From the Rain" | |
| 1984 | Sept. 17, 1983 | Vanessa Lynn Williams | (New York (state)) New York | Millwood | 20 | Preliminary Swimsuit Preliminary Talent | Popular vocal, "Happy Days Are Here Again" | First African American Miss America Resigned on July 23, 1984, due to backlash from unauthorized nude photos of her being published in Penthouse magazine |
| 1984 | July 23, 1984 | Suzette Charles | New Jersey | Mays Landing | 21 | Preliminary Talent | Popular vocal, "Kiss Me In the Rain" | Served the shortest term by any Miss America, lasting only seven weeks |
| 1985 | Sept. 15, 1984 | Sharlene Wells | Utah | Salt Lake City | 20 | Preliminary Swimsuit | Spanish vocal & Paraguayan harp, "Mis Noches Sin Ti" | The first foreign-born, bilingual Miss America (born in Asunción, Paraguay) |
| 1986 | Sept. 14, 1985 | Susan Akin | Mississippi | Meridian | 21 | Preliminary Swimsuit | Vocal, "You're My World" | |
| 1987 | Sept. 13, 1986 | Kellye Cash | Tennessee | Memphis | 21 | Preliminary Swimsuit Preliminary Talent | Piano / Vocal, "I'll Be Home" | Grandniece of singer, Johnny Cash |
| 1988 | Sept. 19, 1987 | Kaye Lani Rae Rafko | Michigan | Monroe | 24 | Preliminary Swimsuit | Hawaiian-Tahitian dance | |
| 1989 | Sept. 10, 1988 | Gretchen Carlson | Minnesota | Anoka | 22 | Preliminary Talent | Classical violin, "Zigeunerweisen" | Former news anchor of Fox & Friends Later served as chairwoman of the board of directors of the Miss America Organization |
| 1990 | Sept. 16, 1989 | Debbye Turner | Missouri | Mexico | 23 | Preliminary Swimsuit | Marimba medley, "Flight of the Bumblebee," "Csárdás" & "Can-Can" | Medical Reporter and Anchor for CBS's The Early Show First Miss Missouri crowned |
| 1991 | Sept. 8, 1990 | Marjorie Vincent | Illinois | Oak Park | 25 | Preliminary Talent | Classical piano, "Fantaisie-Impromptu" | First Miss America winner of Haitian descent Later served as chair of the board of trustees for the Miss America Organization (served for 3 months) |
| 1992 | Sept. 14, 1991 | Carolyn Suzanne Sapp | Hawaii | Kona | 24 | Preliminary Swimsuit | Vocal, "Ain't Misbehavin'" | First Miss Hawaii crowned |
| 1993 | Sept. 19, 1992 | Leanza Cornett | Florida | Jacksonville | 21 | | Vocal, "A New Life" from Jekyll & Hyde | First Miss Florida crowned. Married (and later divorced) Mark Steines |
| 1994 | Sept. 18, 1993 | Kimberly Clarice Aiken | South Carolina | Columbia | 18 | | Vocal, "Summertime" | |
| 1995 | Sept. 17, 1994 | Heather Whitestone | Alabama | Birmingham | 21 | Preliminary Swimsuit Preliminary Talent | Ballet en Pointe, "Via Dolorosa" | First deaf Miss America |
| 1996 | Sept. 16, 1995 | Shawntel Smith | Oklahoma | Muldrow | 24 | | Vocal, "The Woman in the Moon" from A Star Is Born | |
| 1997 | Sept. 14, 1996 | Tara Dawn Holland | Kansas | Overland Park | 23 | Preliminary Swimsuit | Classical vocal, "Où Va la Jeune Hindoue" from Lakmé | Her crowning was featured at beginning of the 2006 film, Little Miss Sunshine |
| 1998 | Sept. 13, 1997 | Katherine Shindle | Illinois | Evanston | 20 | Preliminary Talent | Vocal, "Don't Rain on My Parade" | Performed in Legally Blonde on Broadway President of the Actors' Equity Association Briefly on the board of directors for the Miss America Organization in 2018 Television broadcast moved to ABC |
| 1999 | Sept. 19, 1998 | Nicole Johnson | Virginia | Roanoke | 24 | | Vocal, "That's Life" | Diabetes awareness advocate |
| 2000 | Sept. 18, 1999 | Heather Renee French | Kentucky | Maysville | 24 | Preliminary Swimsuit | Vocal, "As If We Never Said Goodbye" from Sunset Boulevard | First Miss Kentucky crowned |
| 2001 | Oct. 14, 2000 | Angela Perez Baraquio | Hawaii | Honolulu | 24 | Preliminary Swimsuit | Hula, "Theme" from Mutiny on the Bounty | First Filipino American and Asian American Miss America |
| 2002 | Sept. 22, 2001 | Katie Harman | Oregon | Gresham | 21 | Preliminary Talent | Classical vocal, "O mio babbino caro" | First Miss Oregon crowned |
| 2003 | Sept. 21, 2002 | Erika Harold | Illinois | Urbana | 22 | | Classical vocal, "Habanera" | |
| 2004 | Sept. 20, 2003 | Ericka Dunlap | Florida | Orlando | 21 | | Vocal, "If I Could" | Finished in third place on The Amazing Race 15 with her then-husband, Brian Kleinschmidt |
| 2005 | Sept. 18, 2004 | Deidre Downs | Alabama | Birmingham | 24 | | Vocal, "I'm Afraid This Must Be Love" | First former Miss America titleholder to enter a same-sex marriage. |
| 2006 | Jan. 21, 2006 | Jennifer Berry | Oklahoma | Tulsa | 22 | Preliminary Talent | Ballet en Pointe, "Within" | Television broadcast moved to CMT |
| 2007 | Jan. 29, 2007 | Lauren Nelson | Oklahoma | Lawton | 20 | Preliminary Lifestyle & Fitness | Vocal, "You'll Be in My Heart" | |
| 2008 | Jan. 26, 2008 | Kirsten Haglund | Michigan | Farmington Hills | 19 | Preliminary Lifestyle & Fitness | Vocal, "Over the Rainbow" | Haglund's grandmother, Iora Hunt, represented Detroit, Michigan at the Miss America 1944 pageant Television broadcast moved to TLC |
| 2009 | Jan. 24, 2009 | Katie Stam | Indiana | Seymour | 22 | Preliminary Lifestyle & Fitness | Vocal, "Via Dolorosa" | First Miss Indiana crowned |
| 2010 | Jan. 30, 2010 | Caressa Cameron | Virginia | Fredericksburg | 22 | Preliminary Talent | Vocal, "Listen" from Dreamgirls | |
| 2011 | Jan. 15, 2011 | Teresa Scanlan | Nebraska | Gering | 17 | Preliminary Talent | Piano, "White Water Chopped Sticks" by Calvin Jones | Youngest Miss America winner since 1933 First Miss Nebraska crowned Television broadcast moved back to ABC |
| 2012 | Jan. 14, 2012 | Laura Kaeppeler | Wisconsin | Kenosha | 23 | Preliminary Talent | Operatic vocal, "Il Bacio" by Luigi Arditi | Briefly on the Board of Directors for the Miss America Organization in 2018 |
| 2013 | Jan. 12, 2013 | Mallory Hagan | (New York (state)) New York | Brooklyn | 24 | | Tap dance, "Get Up Offa That Thing" by James Brown | Served the second shortest term by any Miss America, lasting only nine months |
| 2014 | Sept. 15, 2013 | Nina Davuluri | (New York (state)) New York | Fayetteville | 24 | | Bollywood fusion dance, "Dhoom Tana" from Om Shanti Om | First Indian American winner First to perform a Bollywood dance at a Miss America pageant |
| 2015 | Sept. 14, 2014 | Kira Kazantsev | (New York (state)) New York | Manhattan | 23 | | Vocal with plastic cup percussion, "Happy" by Pharrell Williams | |
| 2016 | Sept. 13, 2015 | Betty Cantrell | (Georgia (U.S. state)) Georgia | Warner Robins | 21 | Preliminary Talent | Classical vocal, "Tu? Tu? Piccolo Iddio!" from Madama Butterfly | |
| 2017 | Sept. 11, 2016 | Savvy Shields | Arkansas | Fayetteville | 21 | Preliminary Talent | Jazz dance, "They Just Keep Moving the Line" from the NBC show Smash | Previously Miss Arkansas' Outstanding Teen 2009 Previously Miss Collegiate America 2013 |
| 2018 | Sept. 10, 2017 | Cara Mund | North Dakota | Bismarck | 23 | | Jazz dance, "The Way You Make Me Feel” by Michael Jackson | First Miss North Dakota crowned |
| 2019 | Sept. 9, 2018 | Nia Franklin | (New York (state)) New York | Brooklyn | 25 | | Operatic vocal, "Quando m'en vò" from La bohème | |
| 2020 | Dec. 19, 2019 | Camille Schrier | Virginia | Richmond | 24 | Preliminary Talent | Chemistry demonstration | First contestant to perform scientific demonstration and win Miss America Television broadcast moved back to NBC Held title for two years since no competition was held in 2020 |
| 2021 | No national pageant was held due to the COVID-19 pandemic | | | | | | | |
| 2022 | Dec. 16, 2021 | Emma Broyles | Alaska | Anchorage | 20 | Preliminary Social Impact Pitch Award | Vocal, "Let Me Be Your Star" from TV show Smash | First Miss Alaska crowned First Korean-American Miss America Previously Miss Alaska's Outstanding Teen 2017 |
| 2023 | December 15, 2022 | Grace Stanke | Wisconsin | Wausau | 20 | Preliminary Talent Award | Classical Violin, "The Storm" by Antonio Vivaldi | Previously Miss Wisconsin's Outstanding Teen 2017 |
| 2024 | January 14, 2024 | Madison Marsh | Colorado | Colorado Springs | 22 | | HERStory | Graduate of the United States Air Force Academy First active-duty officer and graduate of a military service academy to compete at Miss America |
| 2025 | January 5, 2025 | Abbie Stockard | Alabama | Vestavia Hills | 22 | | Contemporary Dance, "You Say" | |
| 2026 | September 7, 2025 | Cassie Donegan | (New York (state)) New York | Queens | 28 | Preliminary Talent Award | Vocal "Darker Shade of Blue" from the musical Some Like It Hot | Previously Miss Virginia’s Outstanding Teen 2013, placed 4th runner-up at Miss America’s Outstanding Teen 2014 Previously Miss New York Volunteer 2024, Placed 2nd runner up nationally |
| 2027 | September 6, 2026 | Regan Hutsell | Texas | Houston | 25 | Preliminary Fitness & Talent Award | Jazz Dance "Le Jazz Hot!" from the film Victor/Victoria | Former Radio City Rockette |

== Winners by state ==
| State | Number of titles won | Year(s) won |
|---|---|---|
| New York | 8 | 1945, (Note: Competed at Miss New York City) 1976, 1984, 2013, 2014, 2015, 2019, 2026 |
| Oklahoma | 6 | 1926, (Note: Competed at Miss Tulsa) 1967, 1981, 1996, 2006, 2007 |
| California | 6 | 1925, 1941, 1943, 1946, 1955, 1983 |
| Ohio | 6 | 1922, (Note: Competed at Miss Columbus) 1923, (Note: Competed at Miss Columbus) 1938, 1963, 1972, 1978 |
| Michigan | 5 | 1939, 1961, 1970, 1988, 2008 |
| Illinois | 5 | 1927, 1969, 1991, 1998, 2003 |
| Pennsylvania | 5 | 1924, (Note: Competed at Miss Philadelphia) 1935, (Note: Competed at Miss Pittsburgh) 1936, (Note: Competed at Miss Philadelphia) 1940, (Note: Competed at Miss Philadelphia) 1954 |
| Texas | 4 | 1942, 1971, 1975, 2027 |
| Alabama | 4 | 1951, 1995, 2005, 2025 |
| Colorado | 4 | 1956, 1958, 1974, 2024 |
| Virginia | 4 | 1979, 1999, 2010, 2020 |
| Mississippi | 4 | 1959, 1960, 1980, 1986 |
| Wisconsin | 3 | 1973, 2012, 2023 |
| Arkansas | 3 | 1964, 1982, 2017 |
| Kansas | 3 | 1966, 1968, 1997 |
| Minnesota | 3 | 1948, 1977, 1989 |
| Georgia | 2 | 1953, 2016 |
| Florida | 2 | 1993, 2004 |
| Hawaii | 2 | 1992, 2001 |
| South Carolina | 2 | 1957, 1994 |
| Tennessee | 2 | 1947, (Note: Competed at Miss Memphis) 1987 |
| Utah | 2 | 1952, 1985 |
| New Jersey | 2 | 1937, (Note: Competed at Miss Bertrand Island) 1984 |
| Arizona | 2 | 1949, 1965 |
| District of Columbia | 2 | 1921, 1944 |
| Alaska | 1 | 2022 |
| North Dakota | 1 | 2018 |
| Nebraska | 1 | 2011 |
| Indiana | 1 | 2009 |
| Oregon | 1 | 2002 |
| Kentucky | 1 | 2000 |
| Missouri | 1 | 1990 |
| North Carolina | 1 | 1962 |
| Connecticut | 1 | 1933 |

Debut wins

Debut wins timeline
| | States/Federal District |
|---|---|
| 1920s | List: 1921: (Washington, D.C.) District of Columbia; 1922: Ohio; 1924: Pennsylvania; 1925: California; 1926: Oklahoma; 1927: Illinois |
| 1930s | List: 1933: Connecticut; 1937: New Jersey; 1939: Michigan |
| 1940s | List: 1942: Texas; 1945: (New York (state)) New York; 1947: Tennessee; 1948: Minnesota; 1949: Arizona |
| 1950s | List: 1951: Alabama; 1952: Utah; 1953: (Georgia (U.S. state)) Georgia; 1956: Colorado; 1957: South Carolina; 1959: Mississippi |
| 1960s | List: 1962: North Carolina; 1964: Arkansas; 1966: Kansas |
| 1970s | List: 1973: Wisconsin; 1979: Virginia |
| 1980s | List: 1990: Missouri |
| 1990s | List: 1992: Hawaii; 1993: Florida; 2000: Kentucky |
| 2000s | List: 2002: Oregon; 2009: Indiana |
| 2010s | List: 2011: Nebraska; 2018: North Dakota |
| 2020s | List: 2022: Alaska |

=== States that have yet to win Miss America ===
There have been no Miss America winners from the following eighteen states:

- Delaware
- Idaho
- Iowa
- Louisiana
- Maine
- Maryland
- Massachusetts
- Montana
- Nevada
- New Hampshire
- New Mexico
- Rhode Island
- South Dakota
- Vermont
- Washington
- West Virginia
- Wyoming
- Puerto Rico

=== Entities that no longer participate in Miss America ===
- Canada (until 1963)
- Virgin Islands (until 2015)

=== Former Entities of the US that participated in the pageant when they were US entities ===
- Panama Canal Zone (only participated once throughout its existence, in 1925, under a local title)
