= Miss America 1924 =

4th Miss America pageant

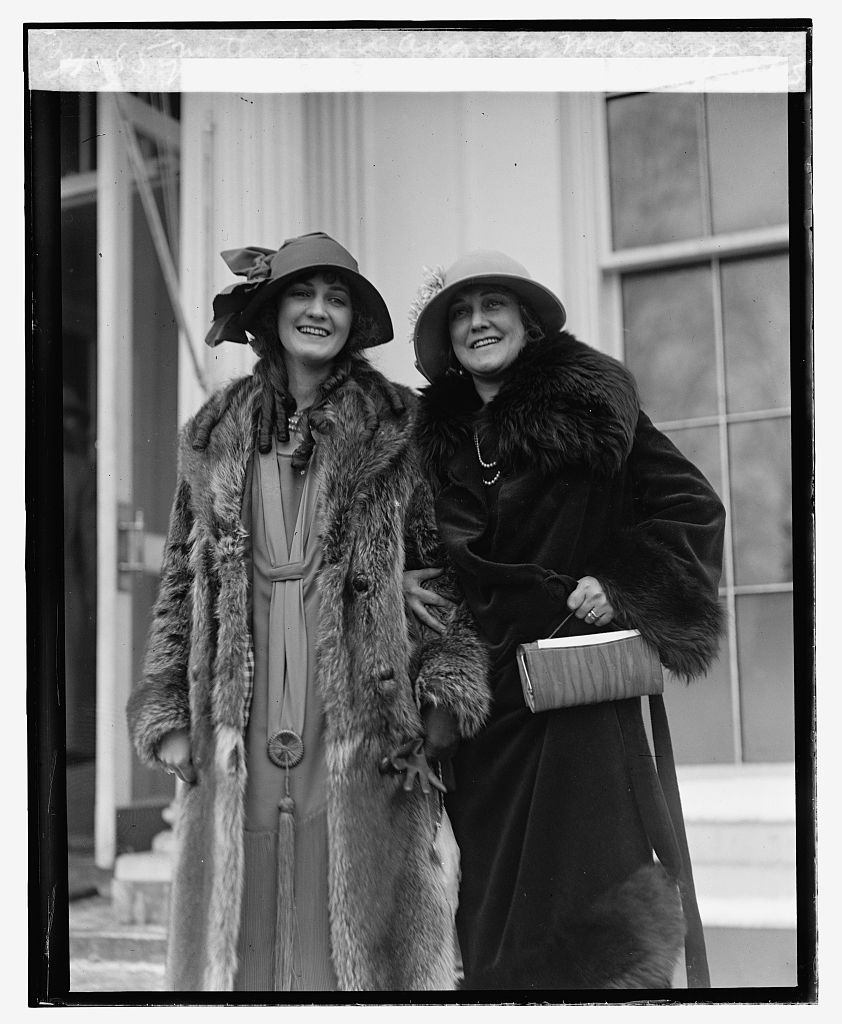
- Miss America 1924, Ruth Malcomson, and her mother, Augusta
- Date: September 6, 1924
- Presenters: King Neptune
- Venue: Million Dollar Pier Ballroom, Atlantic City, New Jersey
- Entrants: 83
- Placements: 16
- Winner: Ruth Malcomson; Philadelphia

Miss America 1924, the fourth Miss America pageant, was held at the Million Dollar Pier in Atlantic City, New Jersey, on Saturday, September 6, 1924. Mary Katherine Campbell, who won the title the previous two years, placed as 1st runner-up. Pageant officials later instituted a rule allowing competitors to be crowned only once. Ruth Malcomson competing as Miss Philadelphia was named Miss America of 1924 against a field of 83 entrants, the largest number of contestants in Miss America history.

Second runner-up Fay Lanphier would become Miss America 1925. Another of the finalists, Beatrice Roberts, became an actress who appeared in more than 50 Hollywood productions.

== Results ==
=== Placements ===
| Placement | Contestant |
|---|---|
| Miss America 1924 | Philadelphia – Ruth Malcomson |
| 1st Runner-Up | Miss America 1922 & 1923 – Mary Katherine Campbell |
| 2nd Runner-Up | Santa Cruz – Fay Lanphier |
| 3rd Runner-Up | Los Angeles – Lillian Knight |
| 4th Runners-Up | New York City – Beatrice Roberts (tie); Chicago – Margaret Leigh (tie) |
| Top 11 | Atlanta – Estelle Bradley; Cape May – Emily Borbach; Greater New York – Margie Booth; Hoboken – Emerita Monsch; Oklahoma City – Willie Mae Stockton |
| Top 16 | Milwaukee – Clara Koehler; New Jersey Newark – Edith Becker; New Orleans – Louise Moore; Youngstown – Pauline James |

== Contestants ==
| Location | Name | Age | Placement | Notes |
|---|---|---|---|---|
| Altoona | Katherine Brown | | | |
| Atlanta | Estelle Bradley | | Top 10 | |
| Austin | Vera Simpson | | | |
| Baltimore | Mary Rose Kenny | | | |
| Bay Ridge | Dorothea Kenna | | | |
| Beaumont | Freeda Rowley | | | |
| Biloxi | Vivian Ruth Shaddinger | | | |
| Birmingham | Mildred Adams | | | |
| Boston | Mildred M. Prendergast | | | |
| Bradley Beach | Edith Wright | | | |
| Bronx | Francis Harten | | | |
| Brooklyn | Hildur Johnson | | | |
| Cape May | Emily Borbach | | Top 10 | |
| Chicago | Margaret Leigh | | 4th runner-up (tie) | |
| Columbus GA | Anne Davis | | | |
| Columbus OH | Lenore O'Ryan | | | |
| Coney Island, New York | Agnes I. Leonard | | | |
| Cumberland, Maryland | Gretchen Carney | | | |
| Dallas, Texas | Etta Mae Collins | | | |
| Decatur, Illinois | Virginia Lipscomb | | | |
| Delaware County, Pennsylvania | Margaret McGee | | | |
| Elizabeth, New Jersey | Doris Mae Bock | 18 | | |
| Fort Worth, Texas | Hazel Doolin | | | |
| Galveston, Texas | Lorraine Holzhaus | | | |
| Greater New York, New York | Margie Booth | | Top 10 | |
| Hammonton, New Jersey | Alice Kind | | | |
| Hoboken, New Jersey | Emerita Monsch | | Top 10 | |
| Houston, Texas | Mary C. Wilmot | | | |
| Jackson, Mississippi | Mabel Batson | | | |
| Jacksonville, Florida | Roberta Russell | | | |
| Jersey City, New Jersey | Bonnie Blair | | | |
| Johnstown, Pennsylvania | Letne von Alt | | | |
| Lakeland, Florida | Margaret Swindell | | | |
| Lancaster, Pennsylvania | Stella Springer | | | |
| Los Angeles, California | Lillian Knight | | 3rd runner-up | |
| Louisville, Kentucky | Juanita Hobbs | | | |
| Manhattan, New York | Alice Beatrice Roberts | | 4th runner-up (tie) | |
| Margate City, New Jersey | Myrtle Marshall | | | |
| Milwaukee, Wisconsin | Clara Ethel Koehler | | Top 15 | |
| Miss America 1922 & 1923 | Mary Katherine Campbell | 18 | 1st runner-up | |
| Nashville, Tennessee | Ann Elizabeth Warner | | | |
| Newark, New Jersey | Edith Becker | | Top 15 | |
| Newburgh, New York | Mary Griggs | | | |
| New Orleans, Louisiana | Louise Moore | | Top 15 | |
| Norristown, Pennsylvania | Dorothy E. Gross | | | |
| Oakland, California | Irma Frazier | | | |
| Oklahoma City, Oklahoma | Willie Mae Stockton | | Top 10 | |
| Paducah, Kentucky | Kathleen McElroy | | | |
| Pensacola, Florida | Lottie Eitzen | | | |
| Philadelphia, Pennsylvania | Ruth Malcomson | | Winner | Aunt of Miss Pennsylvania 1956, Lorna Malcomson Ringler, and great-aunt of Miss Delaware 1981, Jodi Meade Graham |
| Pittsburgh, Pennsylvania | Helen Steubne | | | |
| Pleasantville, New Jersey | Gertrude McDonough | | | |
| Providence, Rhode Island | Freida Leamon | | | |
| Queens, New York | Mary Carlson | | | |
| Reading, Pennsylvania | Nellie M. Paige | | | |
| Richmond, New York | Melise Danning | | | |
| Rochester, New York | Katherine Skuse | | | |
| St. Louis, Missouri | Helen Moore | | | |
| San Antonio, Texas | Katherine Hensley | | | |
| Santa Cruz, California | Fay Lanphier | 18 | 2nd runner-up | |
| Sioux City, Iowa | Alta Sterling | | | |
| Somers Point, New Jersey | Ethel Sipps | | | |
| Stamford, Connecticut | Helen Haddock | | | |
| Syracuse, New York | Alma Jeanne Williams | | | |
| Tampa, Florida | Virginia McRae | | | |
| Texas City, Texas | Thelma Kirsch | | | |
| Tulsa, Oklahoma | Rose Everett | | | |
| (Washington, D.C.) Washington D.C. | Helen Sweeney | | | |
| Watertown, New York | Hilda Farrell | | | |
| West Palm Beach, Florida | Frances Payne | | | |
| Wichita, Kansas | Donna Frye | | | |
| Wilkes-Barre, Pennsylvania | Theresa Matzer | | | |
| Yonkers, New York | Florence Kreisler | | | |
| Youngstown, Ohio | Pauline James | | Top 15 | |
