= Mary Katherine Campbell =

American beauty pageant contestant (1905–1990)

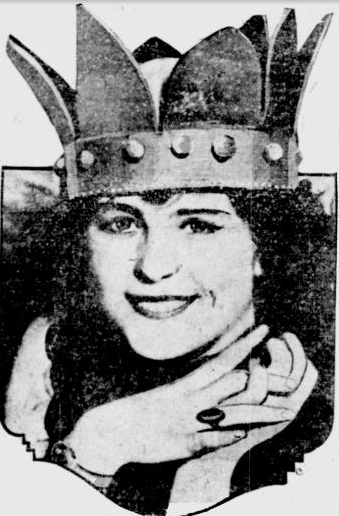
- Campbell in 1922
- Born: December 18, 1905; Columbus, Ohio, U.S.
- Died: June 7, 1990 (aged 84); San Francisco, California, U.S.
- Education: Ohio State University; Ohio Wesleyan University
- Title: Miss Columbus 1922; Miss America 1922; Miss America 1923
- Term: September 7, 1922 – September 7, 1923 & September 7, 1923 – September 6, 1924
- Predecessor: Margaret Gorman
- Successor: Ruth Malcomson
- Spouse: Frederick Stanley Townley (m. 1933; died 1987)

Mary Katherine Campbell (December 18, 1905 – June 7, 1990) was the only person to win the Miss America pageant twice and the second woman in history to win the title.

== Early life and education ==
Campbell's Miss America biography stated she is "typically American and altogether an ideal type", and that "her forebearers for ten generations have been American born".

Campbell had graduated with a diploma from East High School in February 1922, and entered Ohio State University as an art major after her selection as Miss America. This made her the first pageant winner to attend college. She also attended Ohio Wesleyan University. She was a member of Pi Beta Phi's Ohio Beta chapter at Ohio State University.

== Pageantry ==
She became "Miss Columbus" over a field of 170 other women, and proceeded to Atlantic City, where the Inter-City competition had grown to include 57 women from around the country. It would be the last time in Miss America history where "professional" (model, Dorothy Knapp) and "amateur" (West Philadelphia's Gladys Grenemeyer) winners would be judged as finalists against the "Inter-City" champion (Mary Katherine Campbell) and place as runners-up to the Miss America title.

Campbell entered her second successful attempt in the beauty pageant as Miss America competing in Atlantic City against a field of 74 other women from 36 states.

Campbell was Miss America 1922 and Miss America 1923, and she was also 1st runner-up at the Miss America 1924 pageant. Competing as "Miss Columbus," Campbell was only sixteen years old at the time of her first crowning in 1922. She lied about her age by nearly one year to enter the pageant held in Atlantic City, New Jersey. She said that she was born in May 1905 but later admitted that she had lied about her age. After the 1924 pageant and the judges' scores revealed that Campbell had almost won the title a third time, the Miss America Organization changed the rules so that "a contestant may only win the Miss America title once."

== Career offers ==
Campbell received offers from three movies, two Broadway musicals, and a circus. She was even approached by Flo Ziegfeld to become a Ziegfeld Girl, and perform with the famous Ziegfeld Follies chorus girls, but her mother wouldn't permit it. Campbell sang "My Buddy" on the B. F. Keith Circuit for several weeks, but, "You couldn't hear me past the third row," she explained.

== Personal life ==
Campbell married Frederick Stanton Townley (1903–1987), an executive at DuPont. She died in San Francisco county in 1990, aged 84, and was buried at Oak Grove Cemetery in Delaware, Ohio, next to her late husband.

Awards and achievements
Preceded by Margaret Gorman	Miss America; 1922 & 1923	Succeeded by Ruth Malcomson
Preceded by --	Miss Columbus; 1922	Succeeded by Genevieve Mambourg
