= Stephanie Williams (Miss District of Columbia) =

American beauty pageant titleholder (born 1987)

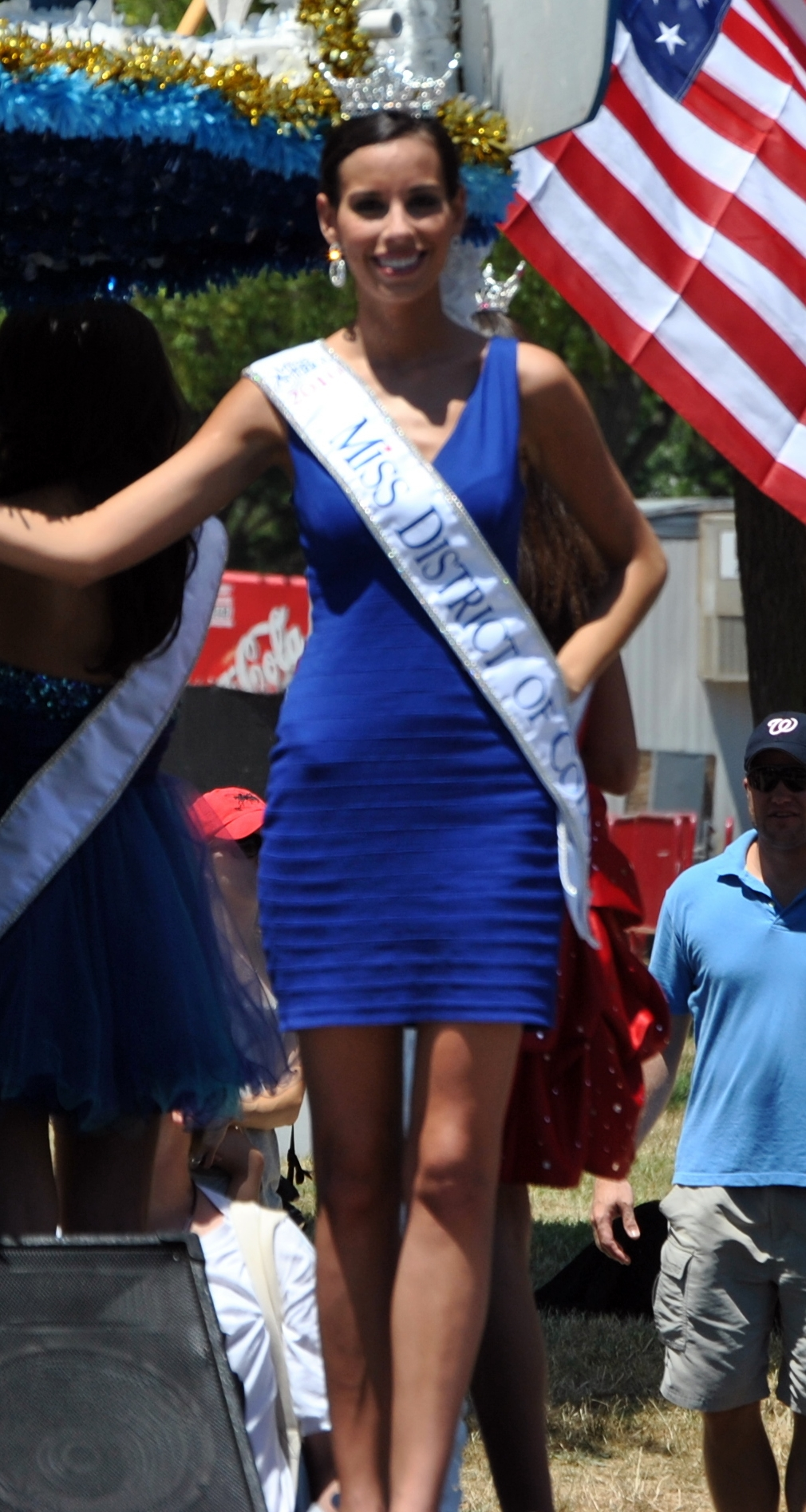
- Born: Stephanie Williams; 1987 (age 38–39); Atlantic City, New Jersey, U.S.
- Beauty pageant titleholder
- Title: Miss District of Columbia 2010
- Major competition: Miss America 2011

Stephanie Ariel Williams (born 1987) is an American beauty pageant titleholder. She won the title of Miss District of Columbia 2010, and competed in the Miss America 2011 Pageant on January 15, 2011, in Las Vegas, Nevada. She is a graduate of Wagner College, with a B.S. in Arts Administration, and is a graduate of the George Washington University School of Medicine and Health Sciences, she went on to UCLA Mattel Children's hospital for her general pediatrics residency, and will be a fellow in neonatology at The Children's Hospital of Los Angeles., She was also 1st runner-up in the Miss District of Columbia 2009 pageant. She grew up in Atlantic City, New Jersey, which was home to the Miss America pageant until 2004.

Awards and achievements
| Preceded by Jen Corey | Miss District of Columbia; 2010 | Succeeded by Ashley Boalch |
