= Miss America 1922 =

2nd Miss America pageant

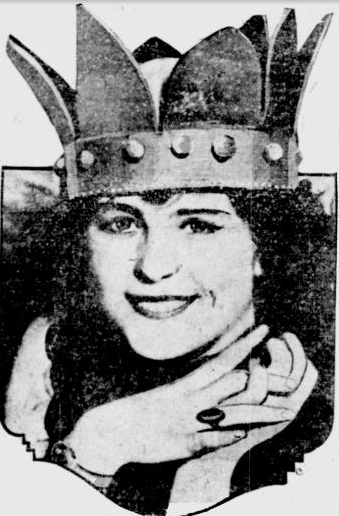
- Mary Katherine Campbell, Miss America 1922
- Date: September 7, 1922
- Presenters: King Neptune (Hudson Maxim)
- Venue: Million Dollar Pier, Atlantic City, New Jersey
- Entrants: 64
- Placements: 4
- Winner: Mary Katherine Campbell; Columbus, Ohio

Miss America 1922 was the second annual Miss America pageant, held at the Million Dollar Pier in Atlantic City, New Jersey from September 7, 1922.

At the conclusion of the event, Miss America 1921, Margaret Gorman of Washington, D.C., and film actress, Anita Stewart, presented the $5,000 Golden Mermaid Trophy to Mary Katherine Campbell of Columbus, Ohio thus declaring Campbell as the official successor to the Miss America title.

Contestants from 64 cities, states, and titles competed at the event. The event was presented by Hudson Maxim dressed as King Neptune.

== Overview ==
=== Organization of pageant ===
The pageant consisted of six phases of competition: rolling chair parade, evening gown, intercity bathing, amateur surf attire, professional mermaids, and the final. There was no talent competition at this pageant (this would not become part of the Miss America competition until 1935), and there was no formal interview sessions between the contestants and judges.

On the afternoon of September 7, 1922, the 58 contestants competed in the rolling chair parade. Later that same day, they competed in the evening gown competition. Both the rolling chair and evening gown competitions were won by Miss Indianapolis, Thelma Blossom. On September 8, 1922, the contestants competed in bathing suit revues. The contestants were divided into three unique groupings: intercity, amateur, and professional beauties. During the bathing revue, the Mayor of Atlantic City and some of the city's police force joined the contestants, wearing their own bathing attire.

The three winners of these bathing/beauty competitions then progressed to the final phase of competition to compete directly against the reigning Miss America 1921, Margaret Gorman. Mary Katherine Campbell, competing as Miss Columbus in the pageant, edged out the previous year's winner, Margaret Gorman, who competed as "Miss America 1921" in the 1922 event, to claim the preliminary "Intercity Beauty Award." Campbell then competed against "Professional Beauty Award" winner, Dorothy Knapp of New York, "Amateur Beauty Award" winner, Gladys Greenamyer of West Philadelphia, and Gorman, the reigning Miss America. After the conclusion of the final phase of competition, judging panel deliberated for over two hours before selecting the sole winner of the pageant. Mary Katherine Campbell, Miss Columbus, was then named Miss America 1922 just after midnight on September 9, 1922.

=== Judges ===
The panel of judges for the national pageant included Heyworth Campbell, Coles Phillips, Joseph Cummings Chase, Arnold Genthe, Willy Pogany, August William Hutaf, Norman Rockwell, and Howard Chandler Christy. Rockwell later reported that the judging panel was given no instructions on how to judge the pageant and select a winner. One judge suggested that they judge each part or feature of the body out of ten, then the woman with the total highest score would win. After they had tried this system, they discovered that judging a contestant "piecemeal" did not result in the most beautiful and well-rounded contestant being selected as a winner. So they "...gave up trying to figure out a system and resolved to trust our eyes. It led to squabbles, because all of us didn't see things in the same way, but it was the best we could do."

== Results ==
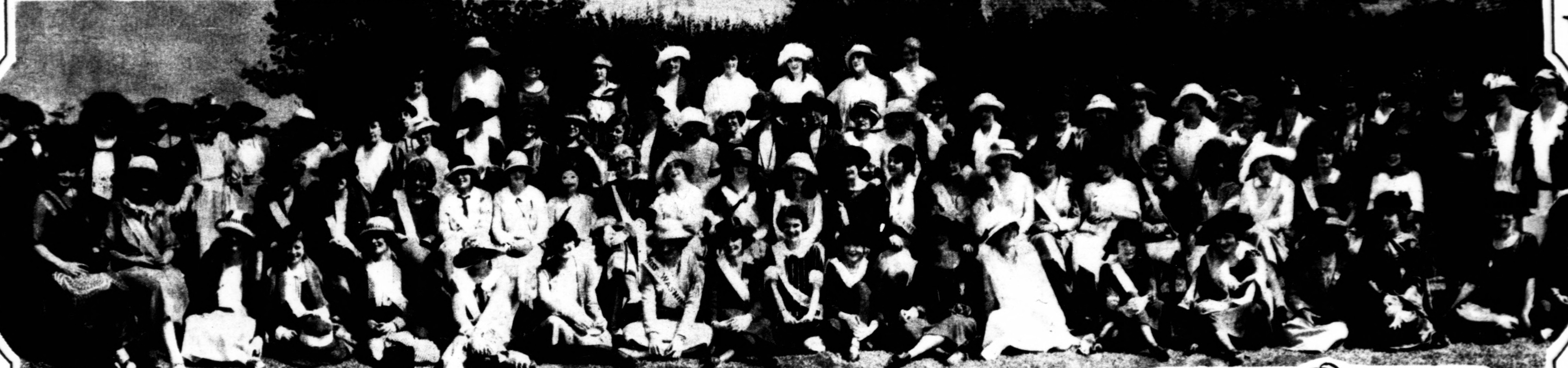
Contestants of Miss America 1922

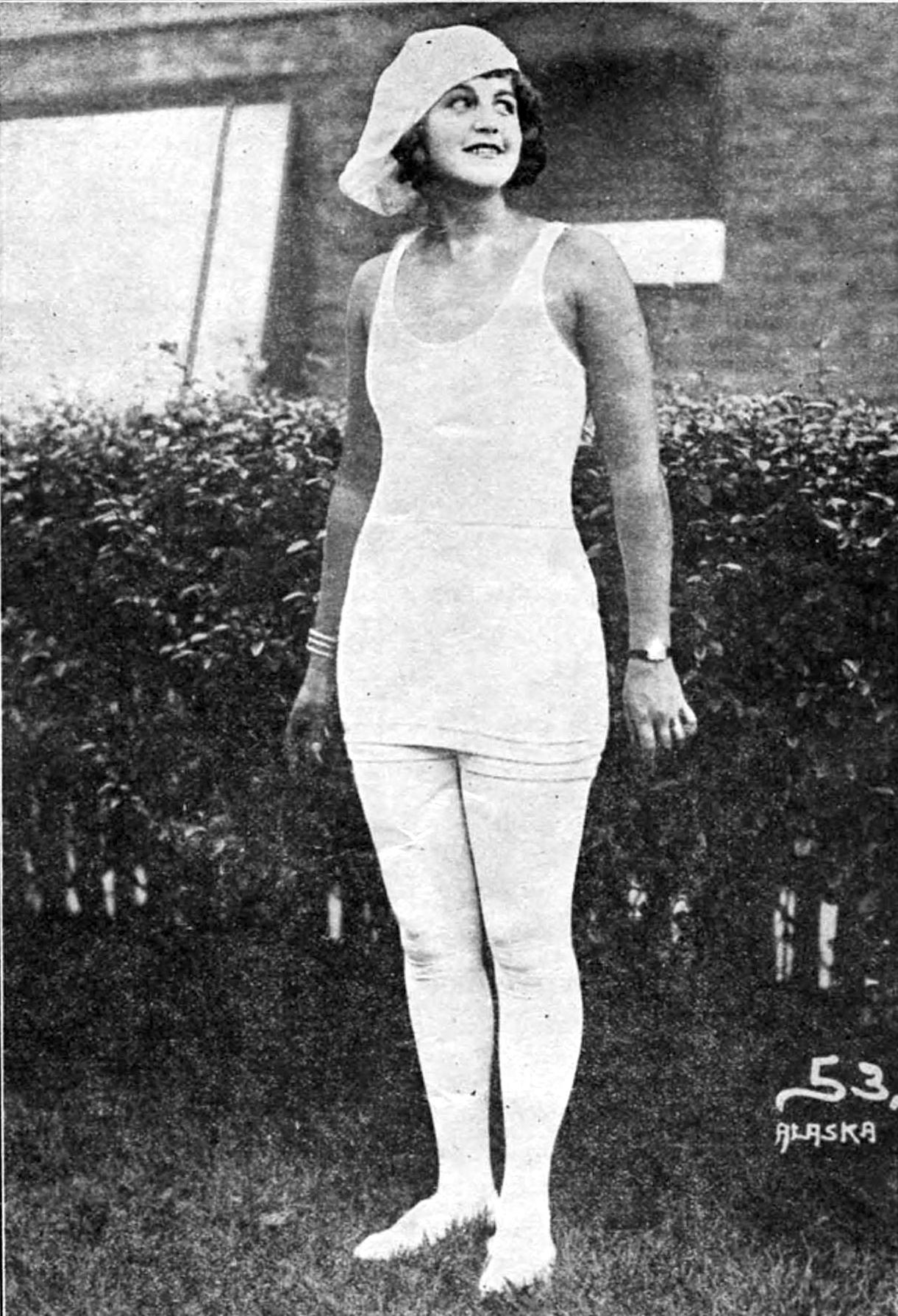
Miss Alaska 1922,
Helmar Liederman

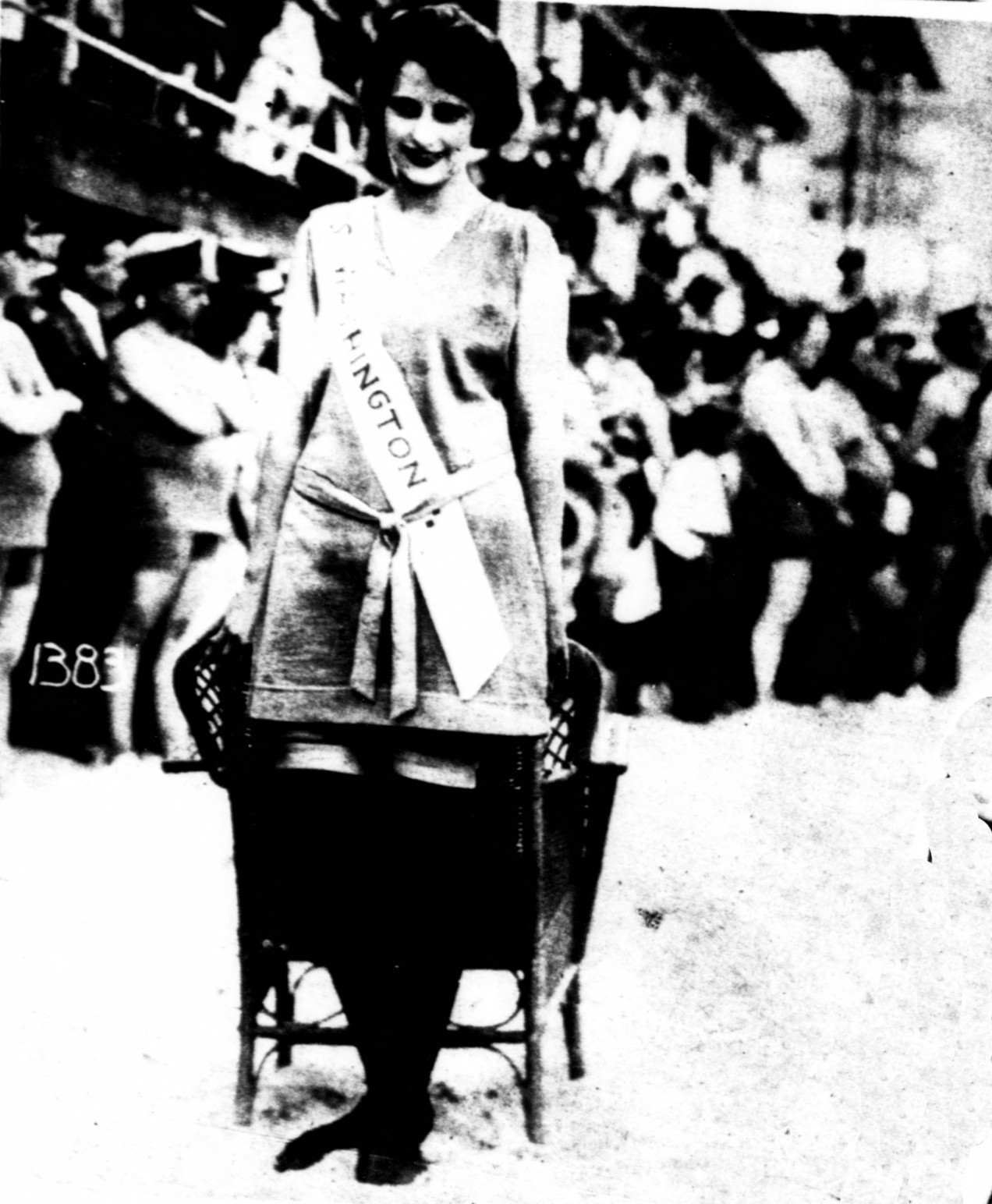
Miss Washington 1922,
Evelyn Atkinson

=== Placements ===
Placement	Contestant
Miss America 1922	Columbus – Mary Katherine Campbell
1st Runner-Up	New York City – Dorothy Knapp
Finalists	Miss America 1921 – Margaret Gorman; West Philadelphia – Gladys Greenamyer

=== Preliminary awards ===
==== Evening Dress Award ====
Results	Contestant
Winner	Indianapolis – Thelma Blossom
Second Prize	Detroit – M. Beth Madson
Third Prize	Columbus – Mary Katherine Campbell

==== Intercity Roller Chair Parade ====
Results	Contestant
Winner	Indianapolis – Thelma Blossom
Second Prize	Pottsville – Leah M. Knapp
Third Prize	Cleveland – Leile Charles

==== Intercity Beauty Award / Bathers' Revue ====
Results	Contestant
Winner	Columbus – Mary Katherine Campbell
Second Prize	Nashville – Sue Burton
Third Prize	Rockaway Beach – Dorothy Hughes

==== Professional Beauty Award ====
Results	Contestant
Winner	New York City – Dorothy Knapp
Second Prize	New York – Pauline Virginia Dakla
Third Prize	Indiana – Sydney Nelson

==== Amateur Beauty Award ====
Results	Contestant
Winner	West Philadelphia – Gladys Greenamyer
Second Prize	Vineland – Mary Elizabeth Edwards
Third Prize	Atlantic City – Estelle Marks

== Contestants ==
Sixty-four contestants competed for the title.

Locality	Contestant	Age (Note: Ages at the time of national competition)	Notes
Akron	Doris Widdersheim		
Alaska	Helmar Liederman	23	Disqualified from Miss America 1923 pageant because she was married
Allentown	Ellen E. Sherr		
Atlantic City	Estelle Marks		
Baltimore	Irma Knabe		
Binghamton	Helen Agnes Searles		
Birmingham	Elise Sparrow	24	Married Boston Red Sox owner, Tom Yawkey, in 1925 and later divorced in 1944
Boston	Charlotte Trowbridge		
Bridgeport	Paula E. Spoettle		
Bridgeton	Sarah Alice Bell		
Brighton Beach	Ruth Andrea		
Buffalo	Bertha Rent		
Chester	Anna Marie Burke		
Chicago	Georgia Hale	22	Starred in Charlie Chaplin's 1925 film, The Gold Rush, and the 1926 silent film, The Great Gatsby
Cleveland	Leile Charles		Competed in pageant despite being married
Columbus	Mary Katherine Campbell	15	
Dayton	Helen Francis Smith		
Detroit	M. Beth Madson		Also competed in Miss America 1923 pageant as Miss Detroit
Easton	Dorothy Haupt		Also competed in Miss America 1923 pageant as Miss Erie
Erie	Thora McDannel		
Fall River	Helen Lynch		
Florida	Eleanor Logan	19	
Greater Camden	Eleanor Lindley		
Harrisburg	Gertrude Shoemack		
Indiana	Sydney Nelson		Nelson lived and worked in New York City at time of pageant but cited as being from Indianapolis; Appeared in the Broadway productions of The Passing Show of 1922 and The Whirl of New York
Indianapolis	Thelma Blossom	20	
Johnstown	Velma Ziegler		
Kansas City	Miriam Chafee		
Lancaster	Elsie Blumenstock		
Long Beach	Lillian Harnach		
Los Angeles	Katherine Grant		
Louisville	Dorothy Heick		
Macon	Frances Gurr		
Memphis	Ruth Doughty		
Miss America 1921	Margaret Gorman	17	Also competed as Miss America 1921 in the 1923 pageant
Montreal	Marie Gauthier		
Nashville	Sue Burton		
New Bedford	Alice Burke		
New Haven	Lillian Peterson		
New Orleans	Maude Allison Price		
New York	Pauline Virginia Dakla		Appeared in the Broadway productions of Bombo, The Passing Show of 1922, and The Whirl of New York
New York City	Dorothy Knapp	17	
Ocean City	Marion Steelman		
Philadelphia	Kathryn Molineaux		
Pittsburgh	Rae Bennett		
Portland	Virginia Edwards		
Pottsville	Leah M. Knapp		
Reading	Evelyn Renninger		
Rochester	Mildred Moon		
Rockaway Beach	Dorothy Hughes		
San Francisco	Tanssia Zara		
Schenectady	Roberta Cooper		
Seattle	Evelyn Atkinson		
South Beach	Mary Hlavka		
St. Louis	Mildred Hose		
Syracuse	M. Rosamond Fahey		
Toledo	Loraine Foskey		
Toronto	Marjorie Smith		
Utica	Janette Adams		
Vineland	Mary Elizabeth Edwards	18	
Washington, D.C.	Evelyn C. Lewis		
Waterbury	Hazel Germershausen		
West Philadelphia	Gladys Greenamyer	18	
Wheeling	Mary Dague		
Wilmington	A. Adele Senft		
