= Jen Corey =

American beauty pageant titleholder (born 1987)

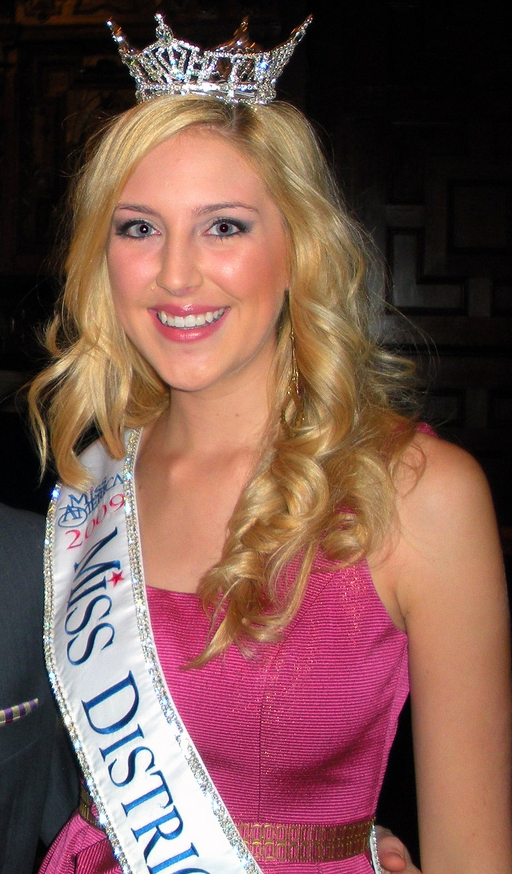
- Jennifer Corey, Miss District of Columbia 2009
- Born: Jennifer Corey; July 21, 1987 (age 39)
- Education: American University
- Beauty pageant titleholder
- Title: Miss District of Columbia Sweetheart 2008; Miss District of Columbia 2009
- Hair color: Blonde
- Eye color: Blue
- Major competition: Miss America 2010 (Top 10)

Jennifer Corey Baca (born July 21, 1987) is an American beauty pageant titleholder, event planner, and community activist.

== Background ==
Baca is a 2009 graduate of American University with a degree in vocal performance. In 2009 she was crowned Miss District of Columbia and finished in the Top 10 at Miss America 2010. During her year of service, Baca served as the local ambassador for the Children's Miracle Network. She worked with Goodwill of Greater Washington with her platform called "Let's Talk Trash", which promoted recycling and reusing. In 2010 Corey was named one of MSNBC's BLTWY Top 40 Under 40 Who Changed DC in 2010.

Baca works for AtlanticLIVE at The Atlantic as Associate Director of Business Development. Previously, she started as an intern at the J Street Group in 2010 and rejoined the J Street Group as a Project Manager in 2012. She planned events and programs for the Food Allergy & Anaphylaxis Network and the Washington National Opera. In 2010 Corey started her own makeup consulting business, Capital Charm. She serves on the board of the Miss District of Columbia Scholarship Program on which she serves as the secretary and executive producer.

== Personal life ==
Baca became engaged to her husband, Joshua Baca, who formerly campaigned for Mitt Romney, on May 10, 2014.

Awards and achievements
Preceded by Kate Grinold	Miss District of Columbia; 2009	Succeeded by Stephanie Williams
