= Miss America 1925 =

5th Miss America pageant

- Date: September 11, 1925
- Presenters: King Neptune (Ernest Torrence)
- Venue: Million Dollar Pier Ballroom, Atlantic City, New Jersey
- Entrants: 66
- Placements: 15
- Winner: Fay Lanphier; California

Miss America 1925, the fifth Miss America pageant, was held at the Million Dollar Pier in Atlantic City, New Jersey on Friday, September 11, 1925. Entrants from the West Coast, Miss California, Fay Lanphier from Oakland, and Miss Los Angeles, Adrienne Dore, captured the top two awards. The newly crowned beauty queen was a runner-up in the 1924 competition. Lanphier was also the first Miss America crowned representing an entire state.

Reports were received that King Neptune, portrayed by actor Ernest Torrence, somehow fell into the ocean and had to be pulled out ("rescued") by lifeguards. Also on hand for the final night of pageant activities was Triton, son of Neptune, played by Douglas Fairbanks, Jr.

Ruth Malcomson, the winner from the previous year, decided not to defend her title due to her belief that professionals were entering the Inter-City competition as a Hollywood film was to be shot around the 1925 pageant. Her decision drew controversy in the press, and began false speculation that the pageant wasn't honest. The pageant committee quickly instituted a new rule that no Miss America could return to competition.

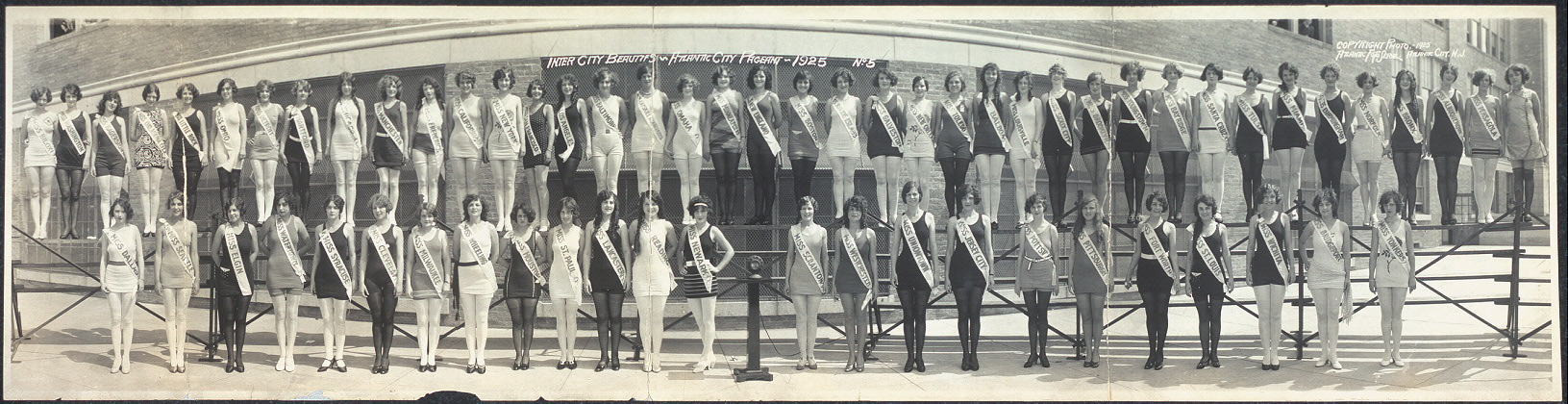
Contestants of the 1925 Miss America Pageant

== Results ==
=== Placements ===
Placement	Contestant
Miss America 1925	California – Fay Lanphier
1st Runner-Up	Los Angeles – Adrienne Dore
Top 5	Bronx – Edith Higgins; Greater New York – Alice Beatrice Roberts; Syracuse – Fern Jackson
Top 15	Biloxi – Laurice McFarland; Cleveland – Elsie Connor; Detroit – Jane Porter; Jersey City – Frances M. Glowaski; Louisville – Madeline O’Laughlin; Miami – Ruth Wooddall; Minneapolis – Lucille McGinnity; Newark – Helen Corcoran; Omaha – Myrtis Roach; Pittsburgh – Mildred Walker

=== Other awards ===
Awards	Contestant
Rolling Chair Parade Winner	Pensacola - Lucy Davis Young

== Contestants ==
City / State	Name	Age	Hometown	Placement	Special awards	Notes
Albuquerque, New Mexico	Celina Chauvin					
Balboa, Panama Canal Zone	Rena De Young		Balboa, Panama Canal Zone			Represented the Balboa in the Panama Canal Zone. The Canal Zone was an area directly administered by the United States and thus was considered US soil, thus making De Young eligible to compete in the pageant.
Baltimore, Maryland	Thelma Krakan					
Bay Ridge, New York	Ethel Groesback					
Biloxi, Mississippi	Laurice McFarland			Top 15		
Birmingham, Alabama	Nellie Kincaid					
Boston, Massachusetts	Nina Wolff					
Bridgeport, Connecticut	Alta Sommerville					
The Bronx, New York	Edith Higgins			Top 5		
Brooklyn, New York	Peggy Moore					
California	Fay Lanphier	19		Winner		
Chicago, Illinois	Margarita Gonzales					
Cleveland, Ohio	Elsie Connor			Top 15		
Dallas, Texas	Elinore Wilkens					
Detroit, Michigan	Jane Porter			Top 15		
Elgin, Illinois	Lucille Burns					
Erie, Pennsylvania	Mary Ann Guth					
Fort Worth, Texas	Mary Louis Kilman					
Frederick, Maryland	Mildred Lee Purdy					
Galveston, Texas	Lucille King					
Greater New York, New York	Alice Beatrice Roberts			Top 5		
Hagerstown, Maryland	Aleda Bradford Cook					
Hartford, Connecticut	Mary Brandaburg					
Houston, Texas	Edna Francis					
Huntington, West Virginia	Eleanor McCracken					
Jersey City, New Jersey	Francis M. Glowaski			Top 15		
Lancaster, Pennsylvania	Estella Wittell					
Los Angeles, California	Adrienne Dore			1st runner-up		
Louisville, Kentucky	Mary Madeline O'Laughlin			Top 15		
Manchester, Connecticut	Helen Kanehl					
Miami, Florida	Ruth Wooddall			Top 15		
Milwaukee, Wisconsin	Virginia Armstrong					
Minneapolis, Minnesota	Lucille McGinty			Top 15		
Newark, New Jersey	Helen Corcoran			Top 15		
New England	Katherine Kearns					
New Jersey	Lee Bartlett					
New Orleans, Louisiana	Thelma Roeling					
Norfolk, Virginia	Dorothea Price					
Ohio	Elarka Towne					
Oklahoma City, Oklahoma	Fern Marlow					
Omaha, Nebraska	Myrtle Roach			Top 15		
Pittsburgh, Pennsylvania	Mildred Walker			Top 15		
Pensacola, Florida	Lucy Davis Young				Rolling Chair Parade Winner	
Pottsville, Pennsylvania	Elsie Gallagher					
Reading, Pennsylvania	Florence Zawidski					
Rhode Island	Loretta Berchman					
St. Louis, Missouri	Eileen Wenzel					
San Francisco, California	Edyth Flynn					
Santa Cruz, California	Yetta Haber					
Scranton, Pennsylvania	Beula Keator					
Seattle, Washington	Evelyn Carman					
Sioux City, Iowa	Dorothy Nordyke					
St. Paul, Minnesota	Dorothy Bastyr					
Syracuse, New York	Fern Jackson			Top 5		
Toledo, Ohio	Emilia Kaniewska					
Tulsa, Oklahoma	Sue Starkey					
Uniontown, Pennsylvania	Mildred Sherman					
(Washington, D.C.) Washington, D.C.	Abbie Eagan					
Watertown, New York	Florence V. Andrews					
Westchester, New York	Emma Soltis					
Wichita, Kansas	Wildeana Withers					
Yonkers, New York	Wilma Ansell					
Youngstown, Ohio	Isabel Robertson					
