= Miss America 1921 =

1st Miss America pageant

- Date: Thursday, September 8, 1921
- Presenters: King Neptune XII (Hudson Maxim); Thomas P. Endicott
- Venue: Million Dollar Pier, Atlantic City, New Jersey, United States
- Entrants: 10
- Placements: 1
- Winner: Margaret Gorman; Washington, D.C.

Miss America 1921 known as the first Miss America pageant, at its start in 1921, an activity designed to attract tourists to extend their Labor Day holiday weekend and enjoy festivities in Atlantic City, New Jersey. Atlantic City's Inter-City Beauty Contest, as it was initially called, attracted over 1,500 photographic entries from around the country, all vying to win the "Golden Mermaid" award and cash prizes. With only 10 contestants, this would be the lowest number of contestants in the pageant's history.

Six "Inter-City Beauties," arrived in Atlantic City and entered a new event: The "Inter-City Beauty" Contest. It was judged in stylish afternoon attire not only by the judges, but also the public, who shared in 50 percent of the final score. Personality played a large role in the voting as masses of people surrounded each entrant to get to know her better and throw questions at them throughout the event. Later, the entrants were escorted and presented on the stage of the Keith Theatre on the Garden Pier.

The amateur prize, the Watkins Trophy, was awarded to Miss Washington, DC, Margaret Gorman, Miss Camden, Katherine M. Gearon placed second, receiving $100 in gold. A special professional prize, the Endicott Trophy, was awarded to Miss New York, silent film actress Virginia Lee.

Inter-City participants competed for honors along with two other categories of winners in the Bathers’ Revue, the amateur group consisting of over two hundred citizens and tourists and the open group consisting of eleven models and actresses. The winner was Margaret Gorman who won the Golden Mermaid award.

Gorman decided to enter the contest the following year and, since Washington, D.C. had already selected another contestant to represent their area in the 1922 contest, officials allowed Gorman to compete as "Miss America" just two weeks prior to the competition which marks the first time the title was actually used.

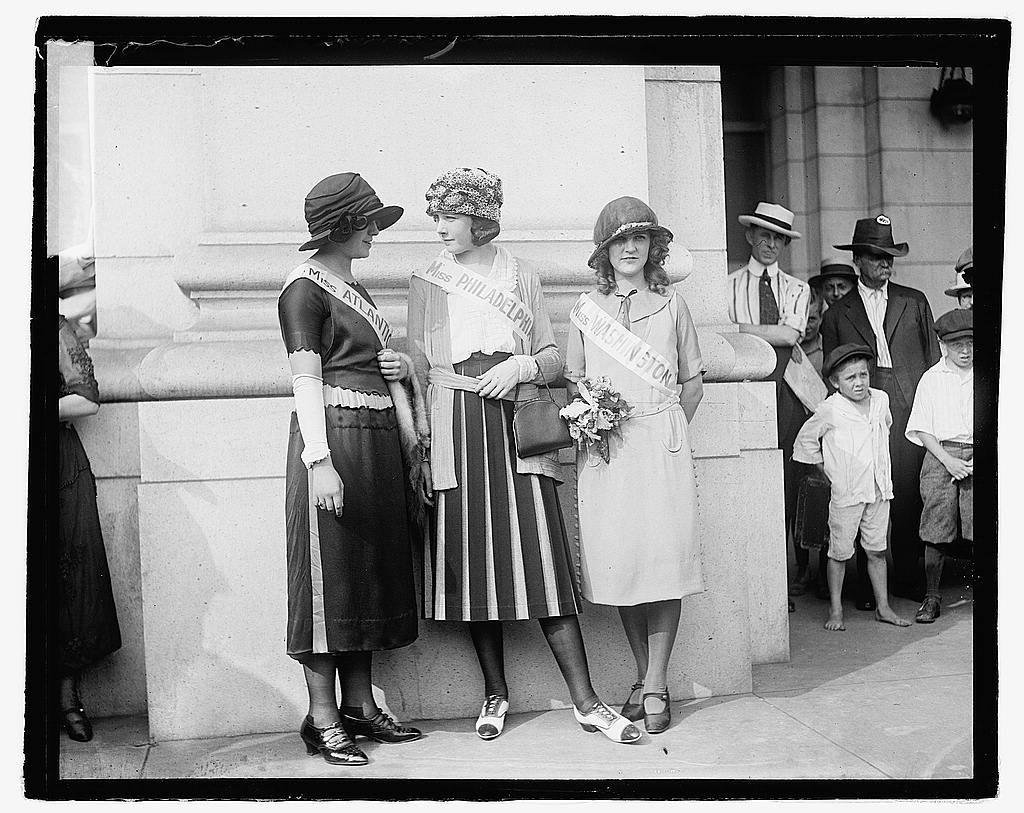
Contestants at the 1921 Pageant; Miss Atlantic City (Ethel Charles), Miss Philadelphia, and Miss Washington, DC.

== Results ==
=== Placements ===
Placement	Contestant
Miss America 1921 "Golden Mermaid"	Washington, D.C. – Margaret Gorman
1st Runner-Up	Camden – Katherine M. Gearon
2nd Runner-Up	Newark – Margaret Bates
3rd Runner-Up	Ocean City – Hazel Harris

=== Awards ===
Final results	Contestant
Amateur Beauty	Camden, New Jersey – Katherine M. Gearon
Bathers' Revue	Washington, D.C. – Margaret Gorman
Endicott Trophy	New York City – Virginia Lee
Golden Mermaid Trophy	Washington, D.C. – Margaret Gorman
Professional Beauty	New York City – Virginia Lee
Watkins Trophy	Washington, D.C. – Margaret Gorman

== Contestants ==
- Winner
- Runner-up
- Non-Finalist Award Winner

City	Name	Hometown	Age (Note: Ages at the time of national competition)	Placement	Special awards	Notes
Camden, New Jersey	Katherine M. Gearon	Camden		1st runner-up	Amateur Beauty Award	
Harrisburg, Pennsylvania	Emma Pharo	Harrisburg				
Atlantic City, New Jersey	Ethel Charles	Atlantic City				
New York City, New York	Virginia Lee	New York City	20		Endicott Trophy Professional Beauty Award	
New York	Lucy Day Smith					
Newark, New Jersey	Margaret Bates	Newark		2nd runner-up		
Ocean City, Maryland	Hazel Harris	Ocean City		3rd runner-up		
Philadelphia, Pennsylvania	Nellie Orr	Philadelphia				
Pittsburgh, Pennsylvania	Thelma Matthews	Pittsburgh				
(Washington, D.C.) Washington, D.C.	Margaret Gorman	Washington, D.C.	16	Winner	Bathers' Revue Award Golden Mermaid Trophy Watkins Trophy	Later competed as Miss America 1921 in the 1922 and 1923 pageants
