= Kate Michael =

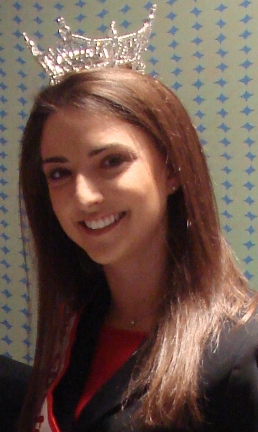
- Born: Kate Michael; March 7, 1982 (age 44); Lexington, Kentucky
- Education: University of Georgia; Johns Hopkins University
- Height: 5 ft 10 in (1.78 m)
- Beauty pageant titleholder
- Title: Miss District of Columbia 2006
- Hair color: Brunette
- Eye color: Hazel
- Major competition: Miss America 2007

Kate Michael (born March 7, 1982, in Lexington, Kentucky) is a writer, on-camera host, emcee, and model who was the Miss District of Columbia in 2006. Michael succeeded Shannon Schambeau as Miss D.C. on July 1, 2006, and also competed in the Miss America 2007 pageant held January 29, 2007.

== Education ==
Michael graduated from Parkview High School in 2000, and went on to graduate magna cum laude from the University of Georgia in 2003, where she was a member of Sigma Kappa sorority. She earned a joint master's degree in business administration and government from Johns Hopkins University in 2008.

== Notes ==
Michael won two local Georgia beauty pageant titles prior to being named Miss District of Columbia. On January 24, 2004, she was named Miss Thunder Road 2004. On September 25, 2004, she was named Miss Gwinnett County 2005. Michael was also named "The Most Beautiful Person on Capitol Hill" on July 27, 2005, by The Hill, which covers Congress. On August 4, 2006, Michael was chosen as one of 17 annual recipients of the prestigious Bryce Harlow Foundation Scholarship Award. Michael appeared as a model in the January 2007 issue of ELLE magazine along with two other Miss America 2007 competitors.

Michael worked for three years as a research assistant for the Senate Health, Education, Labor and Pensions Committee under Senator Johnny Isakson of Georgia. Michael also worked for Congressman Ed Schrock from Virginia.

Michael was chosen to be the face of a new women's Chic Boutique in DC called Green & Blue. On April 2, 2007, Green & Blue opened for business. On April 17, 2007, Michael was honored with the Verizon 2006-2007 Pollin Award for her service and dedication to the Washington DC community. The award is named in honor of Abe Pollin, Chairperson of the Washington Wizards and the Verizon Center.

On July 8, 2007, Michael threw the ceremonial first pitch in the Washington Nationals home game against the Milwaukee Brewers. Nationals pitcher Jason Bergmann acted as her catcher. The game honored all of the area beauty queens as it was called "Miss DC Day at the Nationals." Michael for a time was one of the co-hosts of a regional sports talk show called "Just Another Sports Show." Michael also competed in the 2008 Miss District of Columbia USA pageant on November 24, 2007, and finished as 2nd runner-up. In May, 2008, Michael accepted a position with the Department of Employment Services. In August, 2008, Michael started her own business called "Consignment Cocktails."

As of 2023, Michael was a writer, on-camera host, emcee, and model.

Awards and achievements
Preceded by Shannon Schambeau	Miss District of Columbia; 2006	Succeeded by Shayna Rudd
