= Miss America 1923 =

3rd Miss America pageant

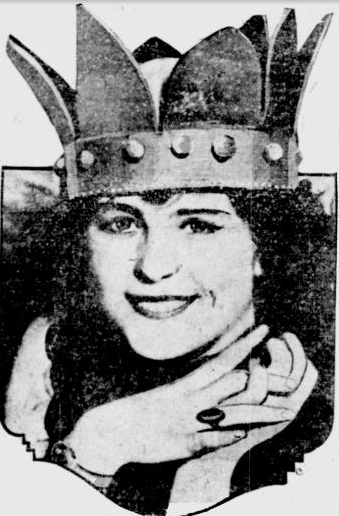
- Mary Katherine Campbell, Miss America 1923
- Date: September 7, 1923
- Presenters: King Neptune (Hudson Maxim)
- Venue: Million Dollar Pier, Atlantic City, New Jersey
- Entrants: 75
- Placements: 5
- Winner: Mary Katherine Campbell; N/A

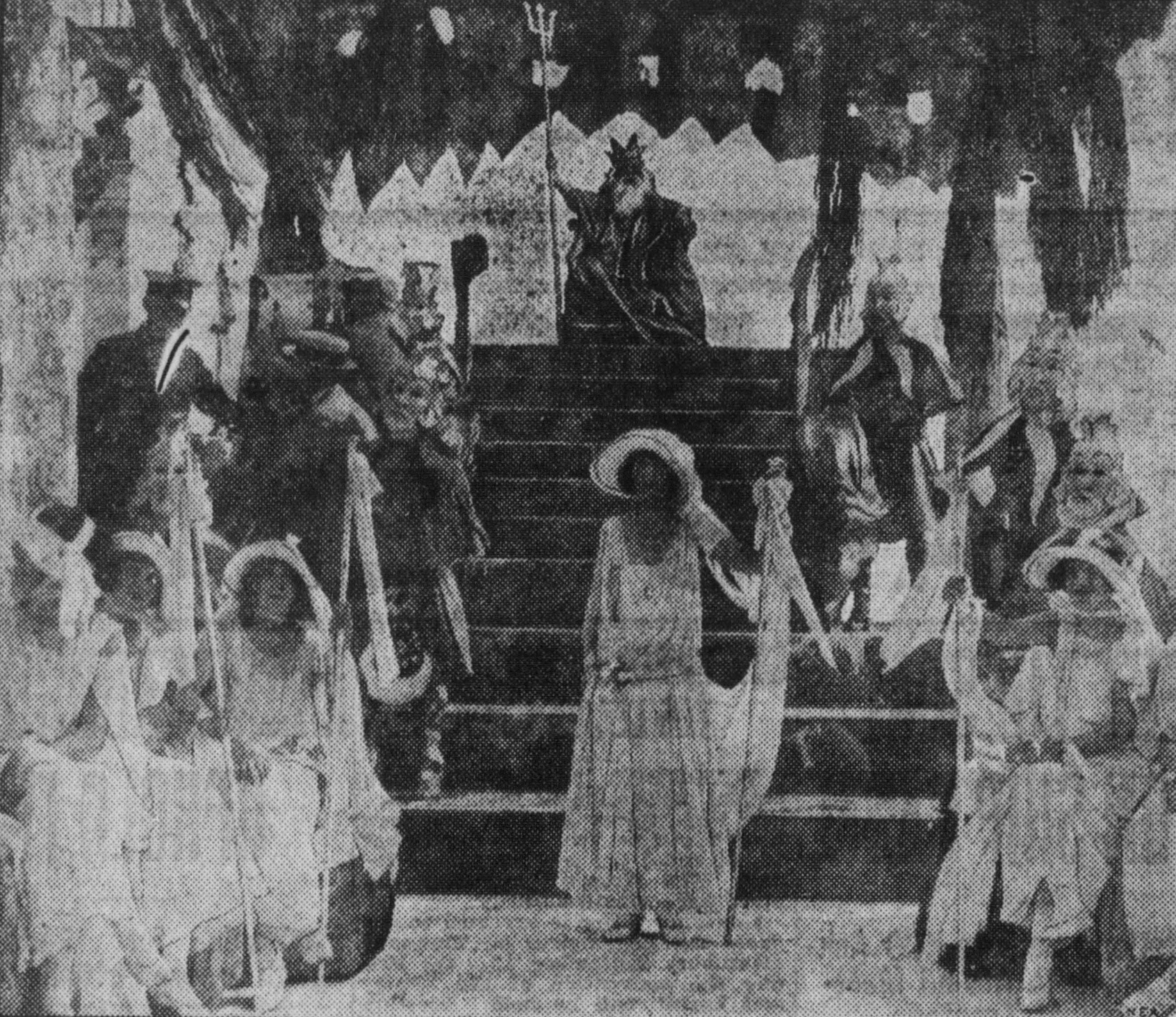
Opening ceremony

Miss America 1923, was the third Miss America pageant, held at the Million Dollar Pier in Atlantic City, New Jersey on Friday, September 7, 1923.

At the conclusion of the event, King Neptune crowned the incumbent titleholder Mary Katherine Campbell as Miss America 1923. Campbell is the only Miss America to win the title twice.

Contestants from 75 cities, states, and titles competed at the event. The event was presented by Hudson Maxim dressed as King Neptune.

== Overview ==
=== Organization of pageant ===
The pageant consisted of four phases of competition: evening dress (called King Neptune's Court); roller chair parade, bathing girl revue, and the final. There was no talent competition at this pageant (this would not become part of the Miss America competition until 1935).

=== Judges ===
The panel of judges for the national pageant included film director, Penrhyn Stanlaws; painter, Joseph Cummings Chase; glamour artist, J. Knowles Hare; illustrator, Dean Cornwell; and painter and illustrator, Norman Rockwell.

=== Aftermath ===
Soon after the conclusion of the pageant, numerous women's clubs and church groups protested against any further beauty contests and "[urged] that they be prohibited by law," "[denouncing them] as vulgar, undignified and demoralizing to young womanhood." One woman was quoted as saying "The beauty of our girls is too glorious, too sacred a thing to be put on exhibition like the freaks in a circus side show, to be commercialized and made the basis for all sorts of mercenary schemes."

Another protest arose when Ethelda Kenvin, Miss Brooklyn, was named the 1st runner-up at the conclusion of the contest despite being married since 1921 to professional baseball player Eppie Barnes. Some of her fellow contestants insisted that her placement and awards be revoked due to her marital status and violations of eligibility rules. The judges' panel were made aware of this but ultimately decided to allow Kenvin to keep her prizes.

Additionally, Helmar Liederman of New York filed suit against the contest directors, Armand T. Nichols and Harry L. Godshall, Sr., for $150,000 due to their refusal to allow her to enter the national competition as "Miss Alaska" because she was a married woman, despite being authorized to compete by a newspaper in Juneau, Alaska.

== Results ==
=== Placements ===
| Placement | Contestant |
|---|---|
| Miss America 1923 "Golden Mermaid" | Miss America 1922 – Mary Katherine Campbell |
| 1st Runner-Up | Brooklyn – Ethelda Kenvin |
| 2nd Runner-Up | Coney Island – Heather Eulalie Walker |
| 3rd Runner-Up | St. Louis – Charlotte Nash |
| 4th Runner-Up | Philadelphia – Marion Green |

== Awards ==
=== Evening Dress Award ===
Award also referred to as "King Neptune's Court."

| Results | Contestant |
|---|---|
| Winner | Memphis – Elizabeth Mallory |
| Runner-up | Syracuse – Eileen Snyder |

=== Roller Chair Parade ===
| Awards | Contestant |
|---|---|
| Grand Prize | St. Louis – Charlotte Nash |
| Second Prize | Memphis – Elizabeth Mallory |
| Third Prize | Philadelphia – Marion Green |
| Fourth Prize | Pottsville – Isabel Lynch |
| Fifth Prize | Brooklyn – Ethelda Kenvin |

== Contestants ==
- Winner
- Runner-up
- Non-Finalist Award Winner

| City / State / Title | Name | Age | Notes |
|---|---|---|---|
| Akron | Thelma Boyd | | |
| Alaska | Helmar Liederman | 24 | Competed in Miss America 1922 pageant as Miss Alaska. Disqualified from 1923 pageant because she was married. |
| Albany | Peggy Ross | | |
| Allentown | Helen Noble | | |
| Altoona | Margaret Lillian Ross | | |
| Asheville | Rose Hildebrand | | |
| Atlanta, Georgia | Frances Thayer | | |
| Baltimore | Billie Muller | | |
| Binghamton | Bonita C. Bement | 19 | |
| Birmingham | Louise Newman | | |
| Boston | Margaret L. Black | | |
| Bridgeton | Sarah Delp | | |
| Brighton Beach | Edithea Lois Wild | 15 | |
| Brooklyn | Ethelda Kenvin | 24 | Married baseball player, E.D. Barnes, in 1921 |
| Buffalo | Irene Knight | | |
| Burlington | Hazel Gove | | |
| Cambridge | Doris Rowden George | | |
| Camden | Florence Nurock | | |
| Cape May | Mildred McCann | | |
| Chicago | Corrine Dellefield | | |
| Cincinnati | Olga Emrick | | Later worked as a stenographer and was active with the "Anti-Flirt Club" |
| Cleveland | Mary Jane Clark | | |
| Columbus | Genevieve Mambourg | | |
| Coney Island | Heather Eulalie Walker | | Star of the lost musical film, Hit the Deck, opposite Jack Oakie |
| Cumberland | Elizabeth Catherine Steele | 18 | |
| Dallas | Ruth Elizabeth Brand | | |
| Detroit | Beth Madson | | Also competed in Miss America 1922 pageant as Miss Detroit |
| Easton | Agnes Connelly | | |
| Erie | Dorothy Haupt | | Also competed in Miss America 1922 pageant as Miss Easton |
| Fort Worth | Bessie Laurene Roosa | | |
| Hammonton | Alice Kind | | |
| Harrisburg | Helen R. Knisely | | |
| Jacksonville | Alyce Phillips | | |
| Johnstown | Betty Grening | | |
| Lakeland | Mary Weaver | | |
| Lebanon | Grace Kohr | | |
| Long Branch | Elene Hicks | 19 | Died of breast cancer in 1940 at age 38 |
| Louisville | Juanita Hobbs | | |
| Memphis | Elizabeth Mallory | | |
| Miami | Katherine Kyle | | Also known as "Katherine Newlon" |
| Miss America 1921 | Margaret Gorman | 18 | Competed as Miss America 1921 |
| Miss America 1922 | Mary Katherine Campbell | 16 | Competed as Miss America 1922; Only woman to win the national pageant twice |
| New Bedford | Mildred Salisbury | | |
| New Haven | Helen Haddock | | |
| New Jersey | Elizabeth McClure | | |
| New Jersey | Alberta Dorothy Smith | | |
| New Jersey | Elsie Banholzer | | |
| New York City | Peggy Verna Shevlin | | |
| Niagara Falls | Nelda Tell | | |
| Norristown | Mildred Maconachy | | |
| Ocean City | Grace Taylor | | |
| Oklahoma City | Mary Deen Overly | | |
| Pensacola | Katherine Floyd | | |
| Philadelphia | Marion Green | | |
| Portland | Winona Evelyn Drew | | |
| Portland | Patricia Smith | | |
| Pottsville | Isabel Lynch | | |
| Providence | Loretta La Flamme | | |
| Reading | Jane Ondeck | | |
| Richmond | Billie Gates | | |
| Rochester | Reta Cowles | | |
| St. Louis | Charlotte Nash | 17 | Married millionaire and theatre magnate, Fred Nixon-Nirdlinger, twice Shot and killed Nixon-Nirdlinger in March 1931 in Nice, France; Was acquitted after successfully arguing act was in self-defense |
| San Antonio | Katherine Helmsley | | |
| San Francisco | Violet Regal | | |
| Sunbury | Mary Botto | | |
| Syracuse | Eileen Snyder | | |
| Trenton | Alma D. DeCone | | |
| Tulsa | Constance Crosby | | |
| Vineland | Mary E. Edwards | | |
| Washington, D.C. | Lorraine Bunch | | |
| West Virginia | Neva Jackson | | |
| Wildwoody | Eleanor Addis | | |
| Wilmington | Ruth Agnes Brady | | |
