= The American Venus =

1926 film

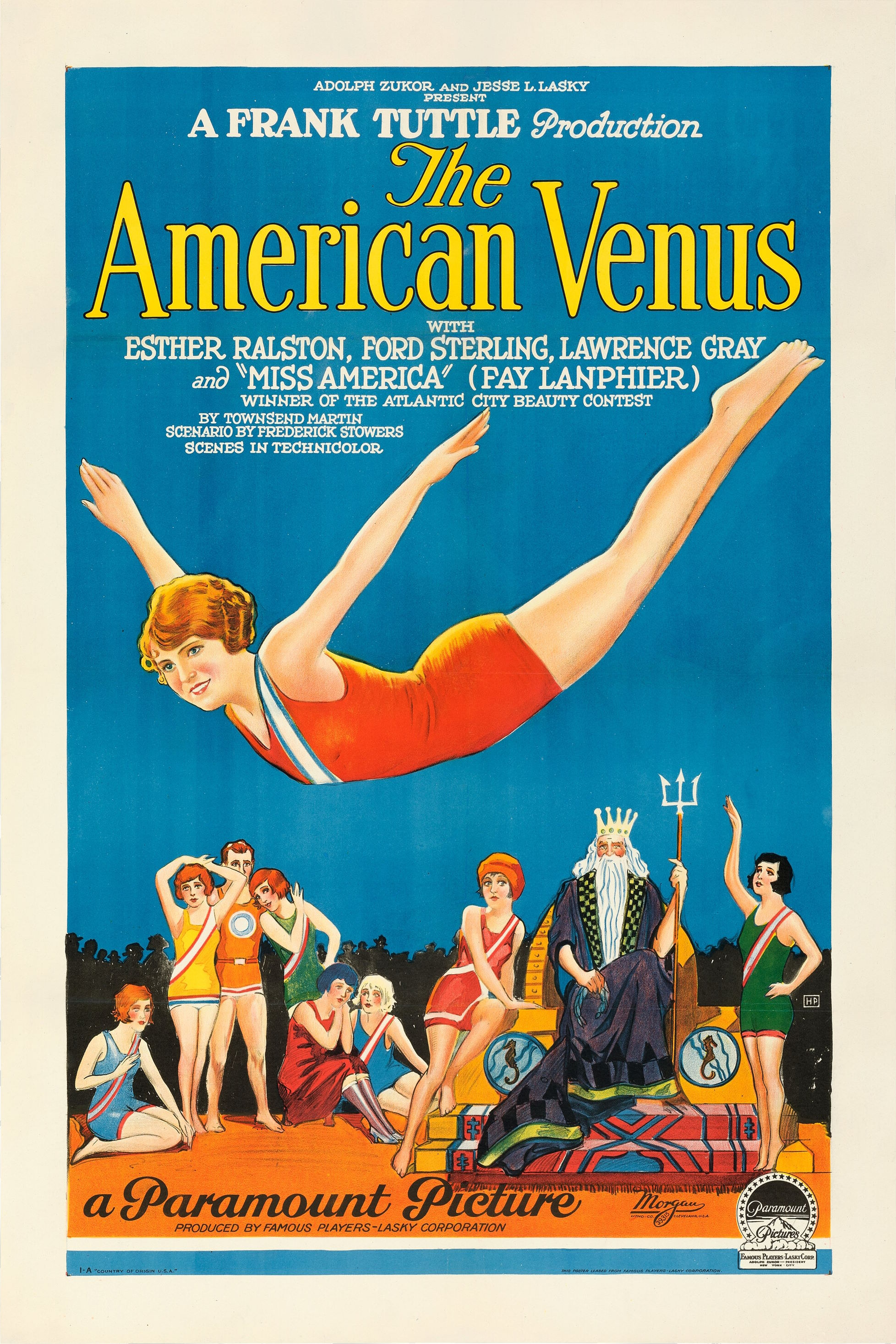
- Theatrical release poster
- Directed by: Frank Tuttle
- Written by: Frederick Stowers (scenario); Robert Benchley (titles)
- Story by: Townsend Martin
- Starring: Esther Ralston; Ford Sterling; Edna May Oliver; Louise Brooks
- Cinematography: J. Roy Hunt
- Production company: Famous Players–Lasky
- Distributed by: Paramount Pictures
- Release date: January 31, 1926
- Running time: 87 minutes
- Country: United States
- Language: Silent (English intertitles)

Trailer for the film

The American Venus is a 1926 American silent comedy film directed by Frank Tuttle, and starring Esther Ralston, Ford Sterling, Lawrence Gray, Fay Lanphier, Louise Brooks, and Douglas Fairbanks Jr. The film was based on an original story by Townsend Martin. The scenario was written by Frederick Stowers with intertitles by Robert Benchley.

== Plot ==
As described in a film magazine review, the daughter of a maker of beauty cream enters and wins a beauty contest in her hometown and then enters the national contest in an effort to save her father from falling into the power of a rival manufacturer, to whose son she is engaged to be married. Through breaking her engagement, discovering her father's rival in a bribery deal, forming an attachment for the rival's former exploitation man, and making friends with the winner of the national contest, the girl succeeds in so shaping events that she and her father win on all points.

== Cast ==
- Esther Ralston as Mary Gray
- Lawrence Gray as Chip Armstrong
- Ford Sterling as Hugo Niles
- Fay Lanphier as Miss Alabama
- Louise Brooks as Miss Bayport
- Edna May Oliver as Mrs. Niles
- Kenneth MacKenna as Horace Niles
- William B. Mack as John Gray
- George De Carlton as Sam Lorber
- Władysław T. Benda as Artist
- Ernest Torrence as King Neptune
- Douglas Fairbanks, Jr. as Triton
- June Elkin as Miss Newark – 1925 contestant (uncredited), also as Fay Lanphier double
- Edythe Flynn as Miss San Francisco – 1925 contestant (uncredited)

== Production ==
Before shooting began, the film became the subject of a minor controversy when the New York Graphic, a newspaper known for its use of yellow journalism, claimed that the film's distributor, Paramount Pictures, had "fixed" the Miss America pageant. In a series of articles, the paper claimed that the eventual winner, Fay Lanphier (Miss California), had been chosen before the pageant because she signed on to star in the film before the pageant was held. Paramount publicly admitted it had been involved with the pageant's promotions and had agreed to pay for pageant's reviewing stand. The studio also agreed to sponsor an "American Venus" contest to be held before the Miss America pageant to determine which of the contestants had the best "photographic possibilities". Lanphier won the American Venus title and was chosen by Famous Players–Lasky then production manager Walter Wanger a role in the film. The New York Graphic was later forced to retract their claim that the contest had been fixed.

Fay Lanphier was the first Miss America winner to star in a feature film. While the film was a popular draw upon its release and played in theatres for two years after its initial release (mainly due to the heavy publicity and the inclusion of two sequences that were shot in two-strip Technicolor), The American Venus received mixed reviews and Lanphier's contract was dropped. The American Venus proved to be more helpful to the careers of star Esther Ralston and Louise Brooks who was cast in a supporting role. Ralston had previously played supporting roles in the silent features Huckleberry Finn and Beggar on Horseback (1925). The success of The American Venus effectively established Ralston's career as a leading lady. The film also helped to boost Louise Brooks's burgeoning career. It was her first significant role (her first role was small part in 1925's The Street of Forgotten Men) for which she received good reviews.

Production took place in the fall of 1925, beginning around August 24 and ending around November 10. The film was shot in part in early September at the Miss America beauty pageant on Boardwalk Hall in Atlantic City, New Jersey, and later at Paramount's Famous Players–Lasky's Astoria Studios on Long Island, as well as on the Coney Island boardwalk in Greenwich, Connecticut (in the vicinity of Round Hill and Banksville), and “near a swimming hole” in Ocala, Florida.

The American Venus was privately screened at the Atlantic City Ambassador Hotel as a benefit under the auspices of the Atlantic City Shrine Club on December 26, 1925. A benefit screening of the film also took place at midnight on December 31, 1925, at the American Theater in Oakland, California—the hometown of star Fay Lanphier. The film premiered on January 11, 1926, at the Stanley Theater, Atlantic City, New Jersey. It officially opened at the Rivoli Theater in New York City on January 24, 1926. The film was copyrighted on January 25, 1926, by Famous Players-Lasky Corporation, and officially released on January 31, 1926.

== Preservation ==
A surviving color sequence from The American Venus

The film is believed to be lost, although pieces of the film's trailer survive. In April 2018, three seconds of technicolor footage from the film was discovered by the British Film Institute.

In 2026, Flicker Alley released Focus on Louise Brooks. It contained all extant material (including trailers, test footage, and a Technicolor fragment) from The American Venus.

== See also ==
- List of early color feature films
