= Miss District of Columbia =

Beauty pageant competition

- Type: Beauty pageant
- Headquarters: Washington, D.C.
- Location: District of Columbia
- Members: Miss America
- Official language: English
- Key people: Lisa Spies (Executive Director)
- Website: Official website

The Miss District of Columbia competition is the pageant that selects the representative for the District of Columbia in the Miss America Pageant.

The District of Columbia pageant, which was suspended for some years during the 1960s and 1990s, is unusual in that many winners come from outside the district. Women are eligible to compete for the title if they attend school, work, or are ordinarily a resident in the District, and many students who have won the title come from out-of-state.

Evelyn Smith was crowned Miss District of Columbia 2026 on June 27, 2026, at UDC Theatre of the Arts in Washington, D.C. She competed for the title of Miss America 2027 on September 6, 2026, at the Kravis Center for the Performing Arts in West Palm Beach, Florida.

== Gallery of past titleholders ==
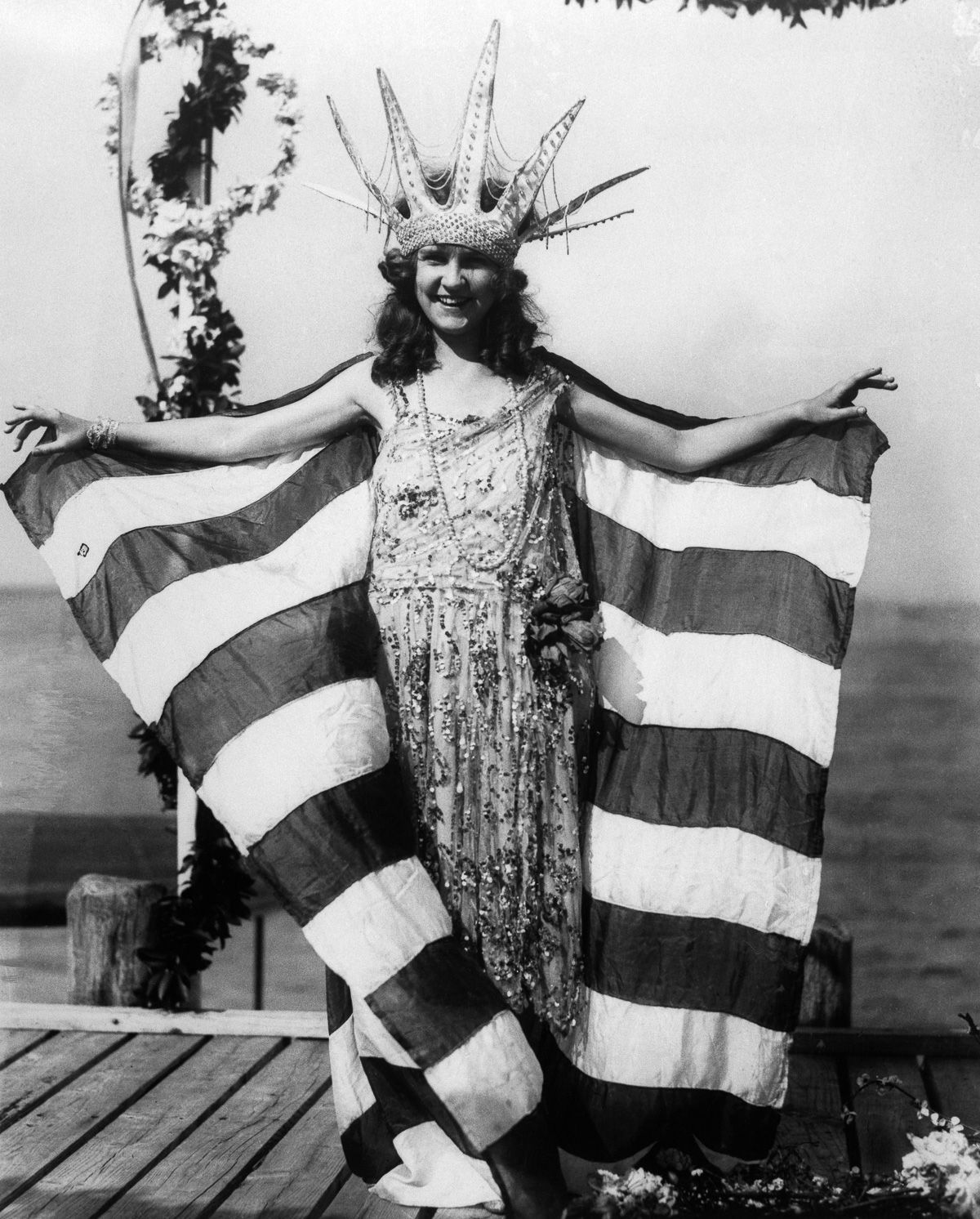
Margaret Gorman,
Miss Washington, D.C. 1921 and Miss America 1921

Helen Sweeney,
Miss District of Columbia 1924

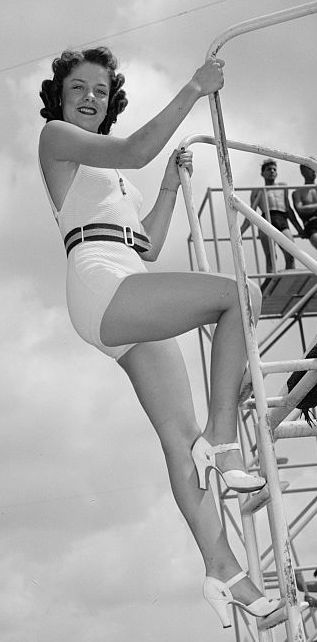
Dorothy Parker,
Miss District of Columbia 1938

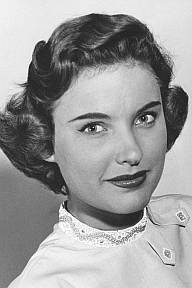
Margo Lucey,
Miss District of Columbia 1956

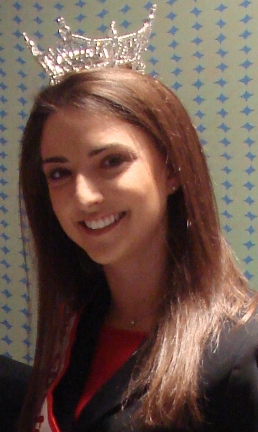
Kate Michael,
Miss District of Columbia 2006

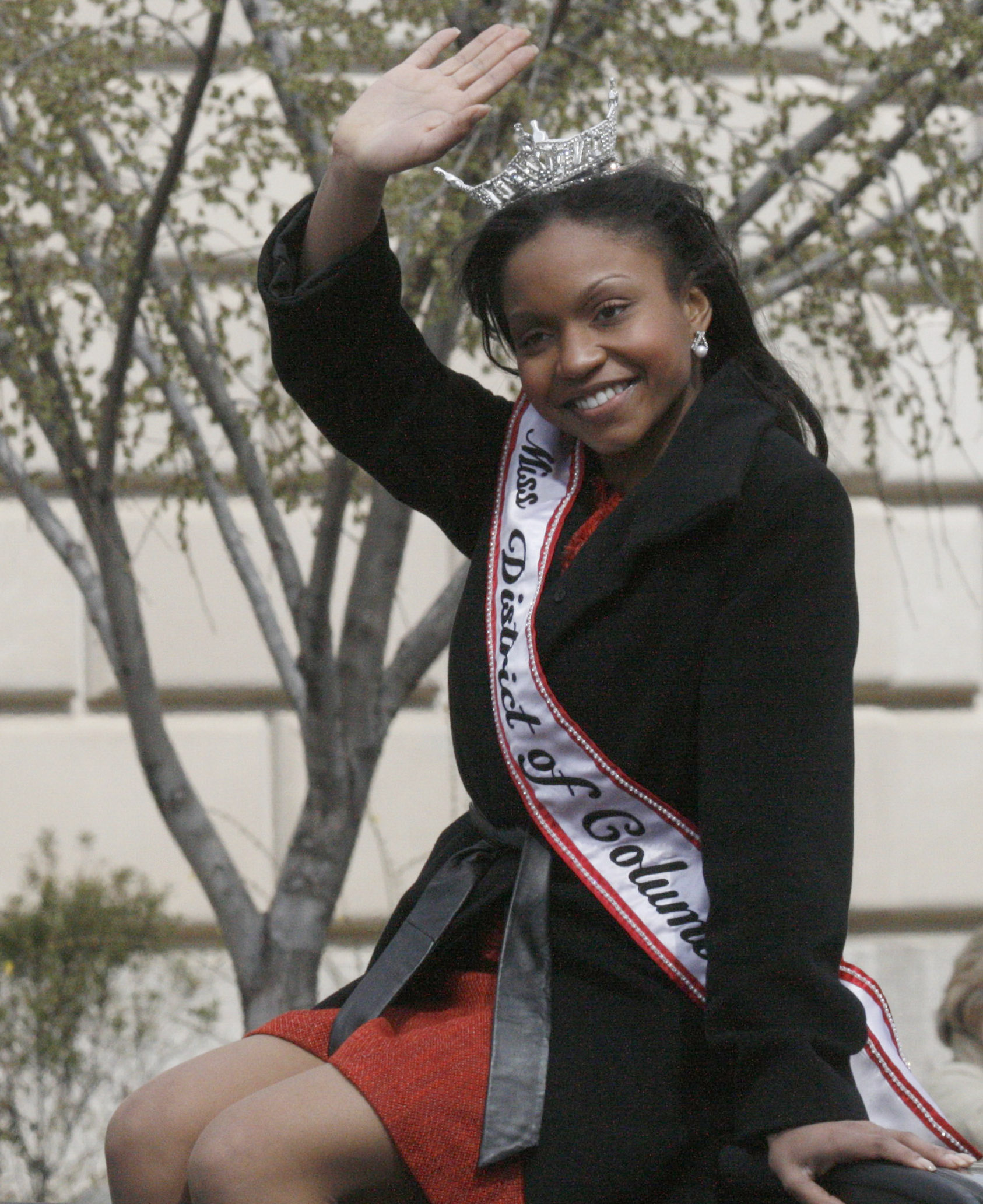
Shayna Rudd,
Miss District of Columbia 2007

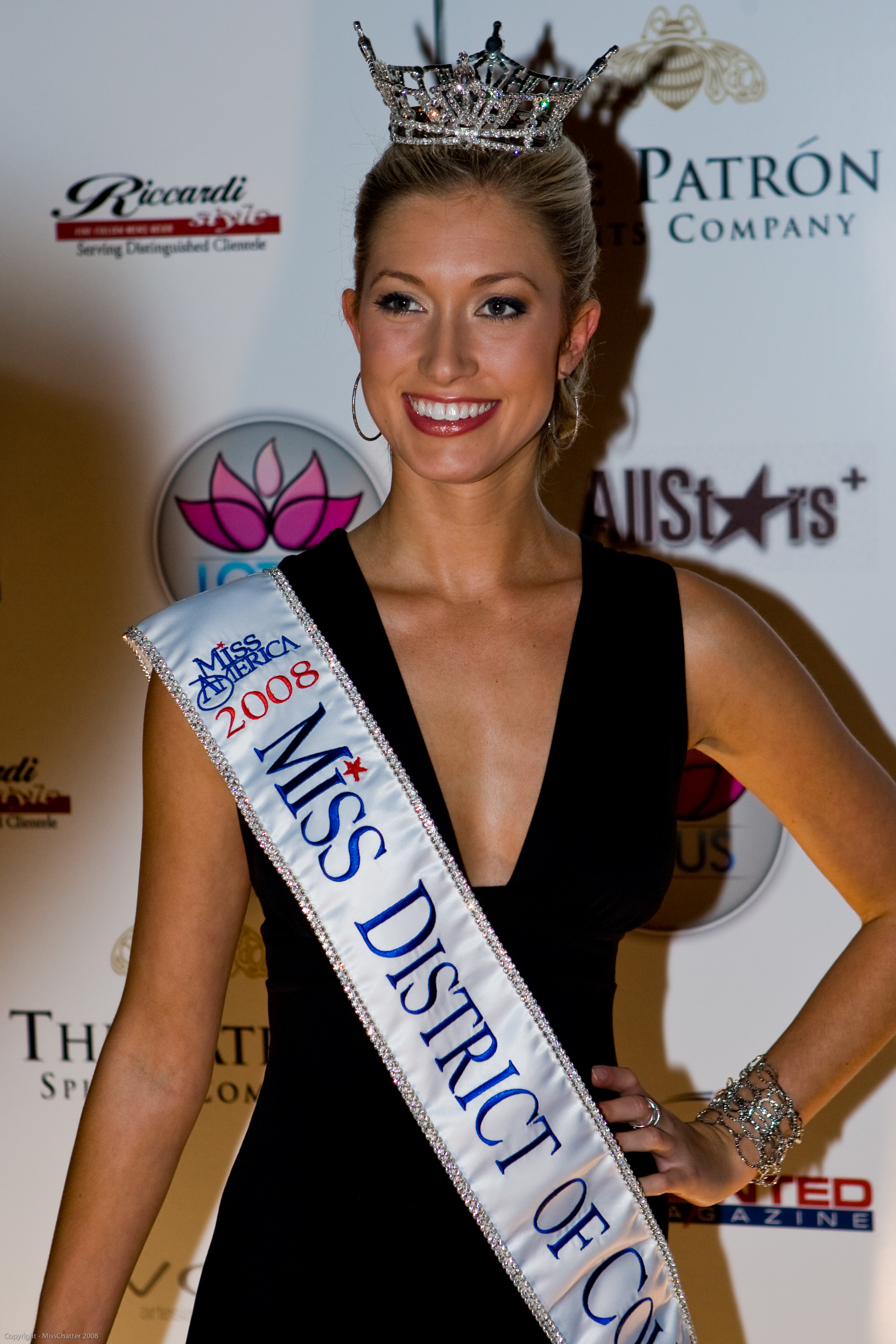
Kate Grinold,
Miss District of Columbia 2008

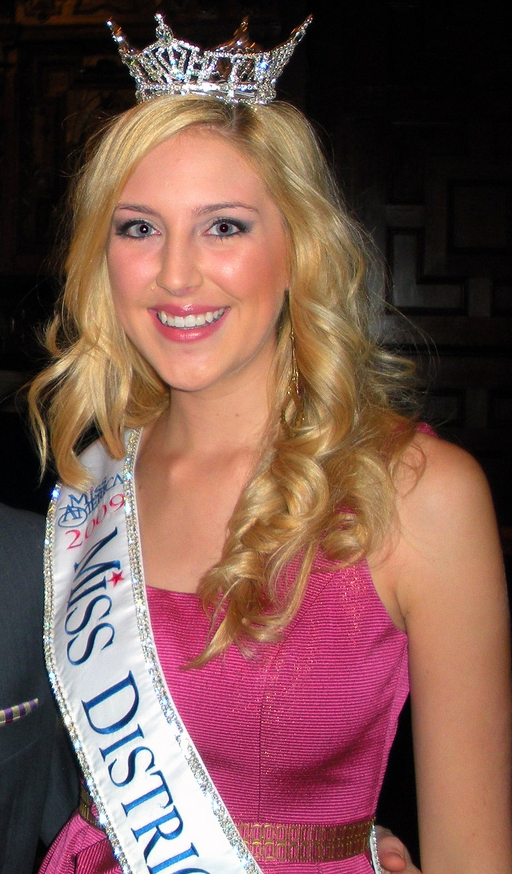
Jennifer Corey,
Miss District of Columbia 2009

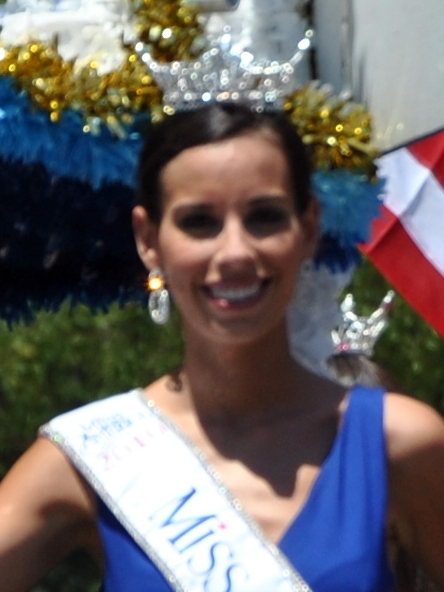
Stephanie Williams,
Miss District of Columbia 2010

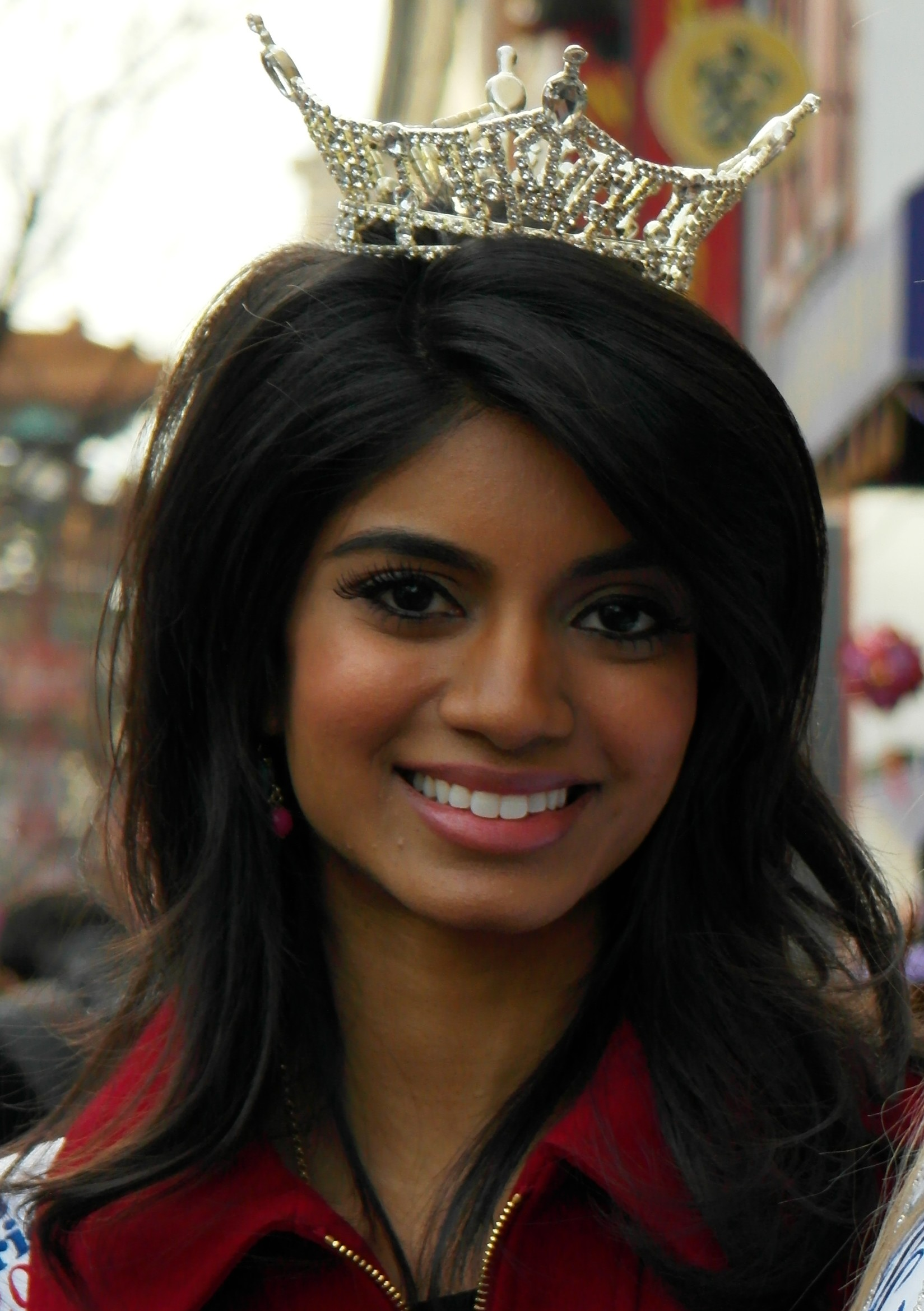
Bindhu Pamarthi,
Miss District of Columbia 2013

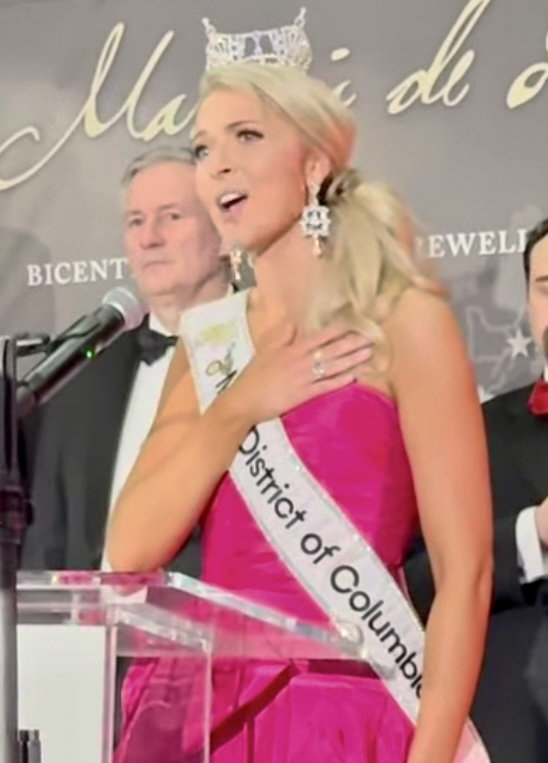
Katie Ann Powell,
Miss District of Columbia 2024

== Results summary ==
The following is a visual summary of the past results of Miss District of Columbia titleholders at the national Miss America pageants/competitions. The year in parentheses indicates the year of the national competition during which a placement and/or award was garnered, not the year attached to the contestant's state title.

=== Placements ===
- Miss Americas: Margaret Gorman (1921), Venus Ramey (1944)
- 1st runners-up: Marjorie Joesting (1926), Margo Lucey (1957), Rosanne Tueller (1964)
- 2nd runners-up: Jean Cavanaugh (1941)
- 3rd runners-up: Ruth Rea (1961), Marshawn Evans (2002), Briana Kinsey (2018)
- 4th runners-up: Dixie Rafter (1943), Shannon Schambeau (2006), Evelyn Smith (2027)
- Top 4: Margaret Gorman (1922)
- Top 10: Linda Weisbrod (1955), Nicole Messina (1999), Kate Grinold (2009), Jennifer Corey (2010), Allison Farris (2019), Andolyn Medina (2022)
- Top 12: Helen Clum (1935)
- Top 13: Dorothy Powell (1945)
- Top 15: Dorothy Parker (1938), Catherine Howe (1940)
- Top 16: Sandra Stahl (1951)
- Top 18: Rita Burns (1933)

=== Awards ===
==== Preliminary awards ====
- Preliminary Interview: Marshawn Evans (2002)
- Preliminary Lifestyle & Fitness: Dixie Rafter (1943), Venus Ramey (1944), Ruth Rea (1961), Rosanne Tueller (1964), Shannon Schambeau (2006), Cierra Jackson (2017)
- Preliminary Talent: Catherine Howe (1940), Venus Ramey (1944), Sandra Stahl (1951), Iris Fitch (1953), Linda Weisbrod (1955), Virginia Pailes (1960) (tie), Rosanne Tueller (1964), Nicole Messina (1999), Marshawn Evans (2002)
- Preliminary Evening Gown: Katie Wadman (2026)
- Preliminary Fitness: Evelyn Smith (2027)

==== Non-finalist awards ====
- Non-finalist Interview: Ashley Boalch (2012)
- Non-finalist Talent: Scarlett Shinault (1962), Toyia Taylor (2000), Shayna Rudd (2008)

==== Other awards ====
- Jean Bartel Military Awareness Scholarship: Andolyn Medina (2022)
- Miss Congeniality: Iris Fitch (1953) (tie), Katie Ann Powell (2025)
- Four Points Award: Stephanie Williams (2011)
- Quality of Life Award Finalists: Nicole Messina (1999), Therese Lizardo (2005), Briana Kinsey (2018), Allison Farris (2019)
- STEM Scholarship Award Winners: Briana Kinsey (2018)
- Top Fundraiser 4th runner-ups: Andolyn Medina (2022)

== Winners ==
- Declared as winner
- Ended as a runner-up
- Ended as a finalist or semi-finalist

Year	Name	Hometown	Age	Local Title	Talent	Placement at Miss America	Special scholarships at Miss America	Notes
2026	Evelyn Smith	Oklahoma City, Oklahoma	25	Miss DuPont Circle	Jazz Dance	4th runner-up	Preliminary Fitness	Previously Miss Oklahoma's Outstanding Teen 2017; Top 9 at Miss America's Outstanding Teen 2018
2025	Katie Wadman	Logan Circle	24	Miss Logan Circle	Dance		Preliminary Evening Gown Award	Previously Miss Iowa USA 2021
2024	Katie Ann Powell	Sandy, Utah	26	Miss Penn Quarter	Harp, "Baroque Flamenco"		Most Inspirational/Miss Congeniality Award	
2023	Jude Maboné	Philadelphia, Pennsylvania	27	Miss Rock Creek Park	Classical Vocal			
2022	Alivia Roberts	Shannon, Mississippi	26	Miss Embassy Row	Ballet en Pointe			
2021	Andolyn Medina	Chesapeake, Virginia	25		Vocal	Top 10	Jean Bartel Military Awareness Scholarship Top Fundraiser 5th Place	Previously Miss Virginia's Outstanding Teen 2012; Top 10 and Preliminary Evening Gown/OSQ at Miss America's Outstanding Teen 2013 Previously District of Columbia Sweetheart 2019; 3rd runner up at National Sweetheart 2019 pageant Currently an officer in the United States Navy
2019–2020 (Note: Titleholder extended to a second full year in 2020 after state and national pageants postponed to 2021 due to the COVID-19 pandemic)	Katelynne Cox	Camas, Washington	24		Vocal		Women in Business Scholarship Finalist	Previously Miss Missouri 2016 within Miss Earth United States organization Top 10 finalist at Miss Earth United States 2016 pageant
2018	Allison Farris	Jasper, Alabama	24		Classical Piano, "Hungarian Rhapsody No. 6" by Franz Liszt	Top 10	Quality of Life Award Finalist	
2017	Briana Kinsey	Hoover, Alabama	24		Pop Vocal, "Born For This"	3rd runner-up	Quality of Life Award Finalist STEM Scholarship Award	Eligible as a graduate student at American University
2016	Cierra Jackson	Columbus, Georgia	24		Gospel Vocal, "Alabaster Box" by CeCe Winans		Preliminary Lifestyle & Fitness Award	Later Miss District of Columbia USA 2020; Top 16 at Miss USA 2020 pageant
2015	Haely Jardas	Fort Myers, Florida	24		Vocal, "Blank Space" by Taylor Swift			
2014	Teresa Davis	Hoschton, Georgia	23		Piano, "Malagueña"			
2013	Bindhu Pamarthi	Washington, D.C.	23		Bollywood Dance, "Stereo Love"			
2012	Allyn Rose	Newburg, Maryland	24		Artistic Roller Skating, "Beat It"			Previously Miss Maryland USA 2011; Top 8 at Miss USA 2011 pageant Later Miss U.S. Supranational 2014; 3rd runner-up at Miss Supranational 2014 pageant
2011	Ashley Boalch	Sandy Spring, Maryland	23		Vocal, "Why Do Fools Fall In Love"		Non-finalist Interview Award	Appears on The Real Housewives of Potomac
2010	Stephanie Williams	Atlantic City, New Jersey	23		Vocal, "This Is My Now"		Four Points Award	
2009	Jennifer Corey	West Islip, New York	22		Operatic Vocal, "O mio babbino caro"	Top 10		Contestant at National Sweetheart 2008 pageant
2008	Kate Grinold	Washington, D.C.	23		Contemporary Ballet Tango, "Tanguera"	Top 10		
2007	Shayna Rudd	Philadelphia, Pennsylvania	22		Jazz Dance, "Feeling Good"		Non-finalist Talent Award	
2006	Kate Michael	Lilburn, Georgia	24		Jazz Dance, "Fever"			
2005	Shannon Schambeau	San Antonio, Florida	25		Tap Dance, "My Strongest Suit" from Aida	4th runner-up	Preliminary Swimsuit Award	2nd runner-up at National Sweetheart 2004 pageant as Miss Florida Later Mrs. Texas America 2010; Top 6 at Mrs. America 2011 under married name, Shannon Patterson
2004	Therese Lizardo	Watchung, New Jersey	24		Hawaiian/Tahitian Dance, "Tahitian Drums"		Quality of Life Award Finalist	
2003	Lisa Ferris	Portland, Oregon	21		Vocal, "Gimme, Gimme" from Thoroughly Modern Millie			
2002	Sarah-Elizabeth Langford	Atlanta, Georgia	23		Gymnastics, "Around the World"			Later Miss District of Columbia USA 2005
2001	Marshawn Evans	Arlington, Virginia	22		Rhythmic Dance Twirl, "I Will Survive"	3rd runner-up	Preliminary Interview Award Preliminary Talent Award	Contestant on The Apprentice 4
2000	Rashida Jolley	Washington, D.C.	20		Harp, "I Got Rhythm" & "Fascinating Rhythm"			
1999	Toyia Taylor	Washington, D.C.	24		Public Address, "Wake Up"		Non-finalist Talent Award	
1998	Nicole Messina	Waterford, New Jersey	23		Tap Dance, "Sing, Sing, Sing"	Top 10	Preliminary Talent Award Quality of Life Award Finalist	
1997	Sonya Gavankar	Joliet, Illinois	21		Vocal, "The Power of the Dream"			
1990–1996	No District of Columbia representative at Miss America pageant							
1989	Donya Rose	Washington, D.C.	22		Lyrical Jazz Ballet, "Over the Rainbow"			
1988	Patricia Morrin	Washington, D.C.	23		Jazz Dance			Crowned after the original pageant results, in which Edwina Richard was crowned, were overturned due a judge being a faculty member where two of the contestants were students
1987	Cheryl Chapman	Arlington, Virginia	21		Vocal, "Come Rain or Come Shine"			
1986	Karen Watson	Arlington, Virginia	25		Classical Ballet en Pointe			
1985	Cherie Ward	Adelphi, Maryland	22		Original Drama			
1984	Desiree Keating	Silver Spring, Maryland	22		Interpretive Dance			Later Miss District of Columbia USA 1986
1964–1983	No District of Columbia representative at Miss America pageant							
1963	Rosanne Tueller	McLean, Virginia			Vocal & Jazz Dance, "I Love Paris"	1st runner-up	Preliminary Swimsuit Award Preliminary Talent Award	
1962	Ann Verner	Arlington, Virginia	19		Vocal & Guitar, "Country Boy"			
1961	Scarlett Shinault	Silver Spring, Maryland	20		Vocal, "I Cain't Say No"		Non-finalist Talent Award	
1960	Ruth Rea	Chevy Chase, Maryland	18		Vocal, "A Little Brains, A Little Talent" from Damn Yankees	3rd runner-up	Preliminary Swimsuit Award	
1959	Virginia Pailes	Hyattsville, Maryland	21		Vocal, "It All Depends on You"		Preliminary Talent Award (tie)	
1958	Lee Berkow	Washington, D.C.	21		Vocal, "Come Rain or Come Shine"			
1957	June Cook	Arlington, Virginia	20		Piano, Rhapsody in Blue			
1956	Margo Lucey	Colesville, Maryland	20		Dramatic Monologue & Vocal, "Autumn Leaves"	1st runner-up		Later Mrs. Maryland 1980; 4th runner-up at Mrs. America 1981 pageant
1955	Judith Dunkle	Washington, D.C.	19		Vocal			
1954	Linda Weisbrod	Washington, D.C.	21		Classical Vocal, "O Mio Fernando" from La favorite	Top 10	Preliminary Talent Award	
1953	Helen Smith	Washington, D.C.	19		Dance			
1952	Iris Fitch	Washington, D.C.	19		Vocal, "With a Song in My Heart"		Miss Congeniality (tie) Preliminary Talent Award	
1951	June Klein	Washington, D.C.	21		Vocal			
1950	Sandra Stahl	Washington, D.C.	21		Classical Vocal, "The Bell Song" from Lakmé	Top 16	Preliminary Talent Award	
1949	Mary Hayes	Washington, D.C.	19		Classical Piano			
1948	Joann Miller	Washington, D.C.	23		Vocal, "An Old, Old Castle in Scotland"			
1947	Margaret Wilson	Washington, D.C.	19		Dance, "Mexican Hat Dance"			
1946	Jeanne Carlson	Washington, D.C.	19		Vocal, "Doin' What Comes Natur'lly"			
1945	Dorothy Powell	Washington, D.C.	21		Dramatic Reading from Saint Joan	Top 13		
1944	Venus Ramey	Washington, D.C.	19		Vocal in English and Spanish & Dance, "Take It Easy"	Winner	Preliminary Swimsuit Award Preliminary Talent Award	
1943	Dixie Rafter	Washington, D.C.	18		Vocal / Dance, "They're Either Too Young or Too Old" from Thank Your Lucky Stars	4th runner-up	Preliminary Swimsuit Award	
1942	Marilyn Makin	Washington, D.C.	18		Vocal			
1941	Jean Cavanaugh	Washington, D.C.	18		Soft Shoe Dance, "A Pretty Girl Is Like a Melody"	2nd runner-up		
1940	Catherine Howe	Washington, D.C.	22		Dance, "The Yam"	Top 15	Preliminary Talent Award	
1939	Evelyn Foster	Washington, D.C.	19		Ballet en Pointe			
1938	Dorothy Parker	Washington, D.C.			Vocal & Tap Dance, "How'd You Like to Love Me"	Top 15		
1937	Helen Greene	Washington, D.C.	24		Blues Vocal & Piano			
1936	Shirley Schwartz	Washington, D.C.						First Jewish titleholder
1935	Helen Clum	Washington, D.C.	18		Vocal & Dance, "Every Day I'll Fall In Love With You"	Top 12		
1934	No national pageant was held							
1933	Rita Burns	Washington, D.C.	19		N/A	Top 18		
1932	No national pageants were held							
1931	No national pageants were held							
1930	No national pageants were held							
1929	No national pageants were held							
1928	No national pageants were held							
1927	Gladys Cookman	Washington, D.C.			N/A			
1926	Marjorie Joesting	Washington, D.C.			N/A	1st runner-up		
1925	Abbie Eagan	Washington, D.C.			N/A			
1924	Helen Sweeney	Washington, D.C.			N/A			
1923	Margaret Gorman	Washington, D.C.	18		N/A			Competed as Miss America 1921
1923	Lorraine Bunch	Washington, D.C.			N/A			Competed as Miss Washington, D.C. at national pageant
1922	Margaret Gorman	Washington, D.C.	17		N/A	Top 4		Returned to defend her title and competed as Miss America 1921
1922	Evelyn C. Lewis	Washington, D.C.			N/A			Competed as Miss Washington, D.C. at national pageant
1921	Margaret Gorman	Washington, D.C.	16		N/A	Winner	Bathers' Revue Award Golden Mermaid Trophy	Competed as Miss Washington, D.C. at national pageant
