= Dorothy Knapp =

American dancer, actress, model and Ziegfeld girl

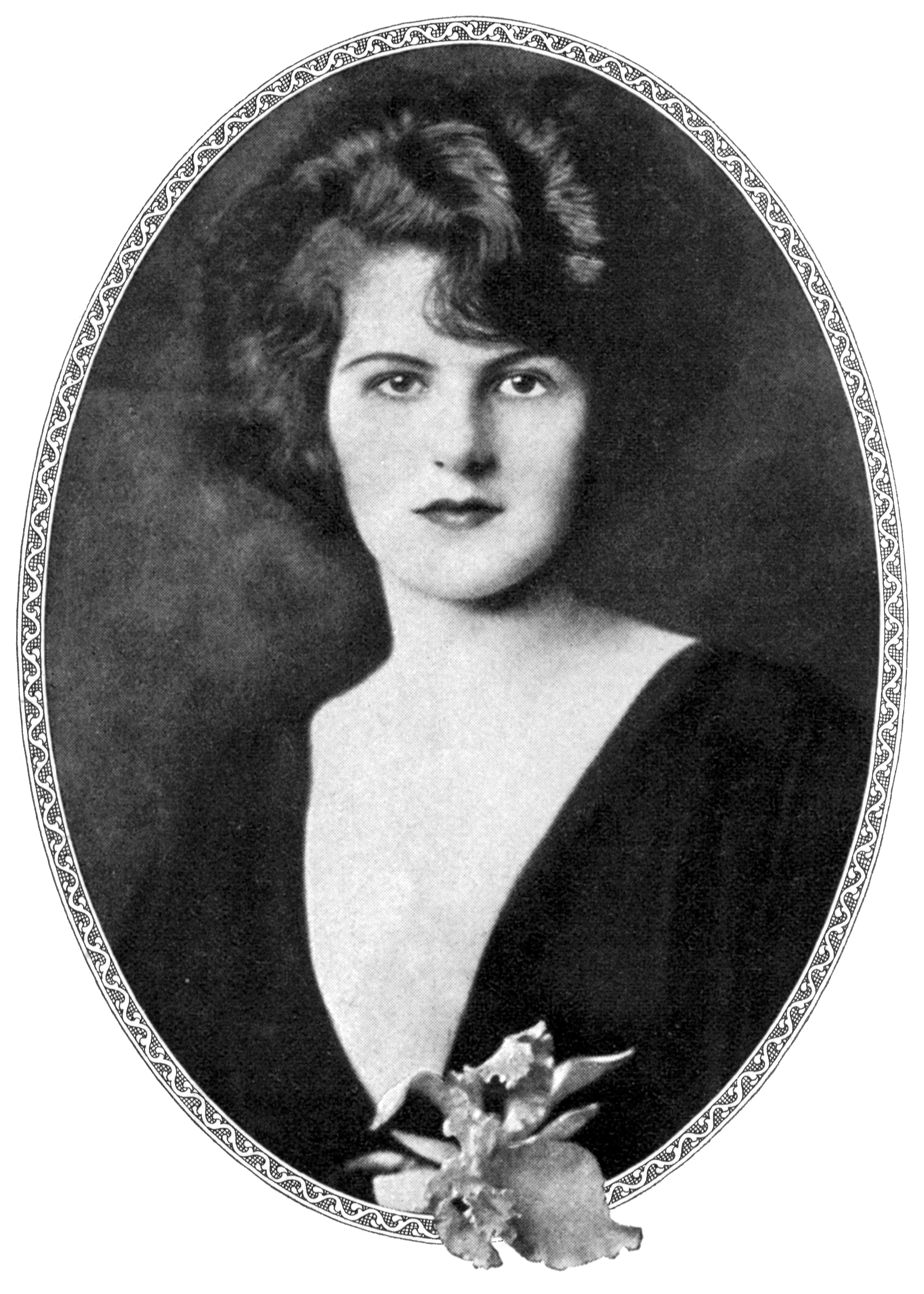
- Dorothy Knapp, from a 1924 publication.
- Born: 1900–1904; Chicago, Illinois, U.S.
- Died: Los Angeles, California, U.S. (Likely, but not definitively confirmed)
- Occupations: Dancer, actress, model
- Spouse: Jack Edmond (m.1933–div.1934)
- Beauty pageant titleholder
- Title: Miss New York City 1922
- Major competition: Miss America 1922 (first runner-up)

Dorothy Knapp (born 1900–1904) was an American dancer, actress, model and Ziegfeld girl.

== Early life ==
Dorothy Knapp was born in Chicago, or Dallas (sources vary). She lived in New York City after 1915, and was dancing professionally by 1916, in the company of Norma Gould.

== Career ==
Knapp began modeling and entering beauty contests as a teenager, and was publicized as "American Venus" in 1922. She won a precursor contest to what became the Miss America pageant in Atlantic City. In a 1922 newsreel she was described as "the perfect woman". Her measurements were published in detail, and she was often photographed in a swimsuit doing exercises. "Keeping fit is a pleasure by radio," one such photograph of Knapp was captioned.

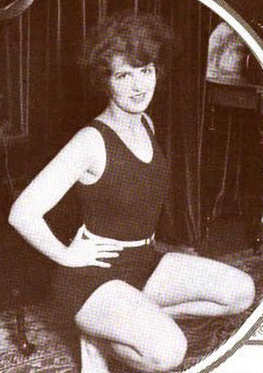
Dorothy Knapp in a swimsuit, from a 1923 publication.

From beauty pageants and glamorous photographs, she was cast in variety shows, including Earl Carroll's Vanities in 1923, 1926, and 1928, and the Ziegfeld Follies of 1924 and 1925. Louise Brooks, who remembered Knapp as one of Ziegfeld's "prize beauties" and shared a dressing room with her, noted that "people like Walter Wanger and Gilbert Miller would meet there, ostensibly to hear my reviews of books that Herman Mankiewicz gave me to read. What they actually came for was to watch Dorothy doing a striptease in front of a full-length mirror." In 1929 she starred on Broadway in Fioretta; the show's failure was blamed on Knapp's lack of musical talent, and she was hospitalized after she was fired from the production, and lawsuits followed. She appeared twice more on Broadway, in Free For All (1931) and Broadway Interlude (1936), but both shows closed quickly.

On screen, she was seen in the films None But the Brave (1928), The Border Patrol (1930), Whoopee! (1930), and Under the Cock-Eyed Moon (1930). She appeared as a host and performer on several radio dramas on the NBC radio network, in the spring of 1931. Her radio program "Backstage with Dorothy Knapp" was about her experiences in show business. Simultaneous to her radio work in 1931, NBC was also preparing her for becoming a host on their new television broadcasts; the press frequently referred to her as NBC's "Television Girl," and she first appeared on some experimental television transmissions in June 1931.

== Personal life ==
Knapp was involved with Earl Carroll, and was briefly engaged to actor Chick Chandler, cousin of illustrator Howard Chandler Christy. In 1933 she married a Canadian radio announcer, Jack Edmond; they divorced in 1934. She made public comments about withdrawing to a convent, possibly in Mexico, but had not done so before 1936, when she was reported living in Tudor City and making sculptures. In 1957, Walter Winchell mentioned that Knapp was working at the jewelry counter of a department store, and living with Anna May Wong.

Awards and achievements
Preceded by Virginia Lee	Miss New York City; 1922	Succeeded by Peggy Verna Shevlin
