= Ruth Malcomson =

American model (1906–1988)

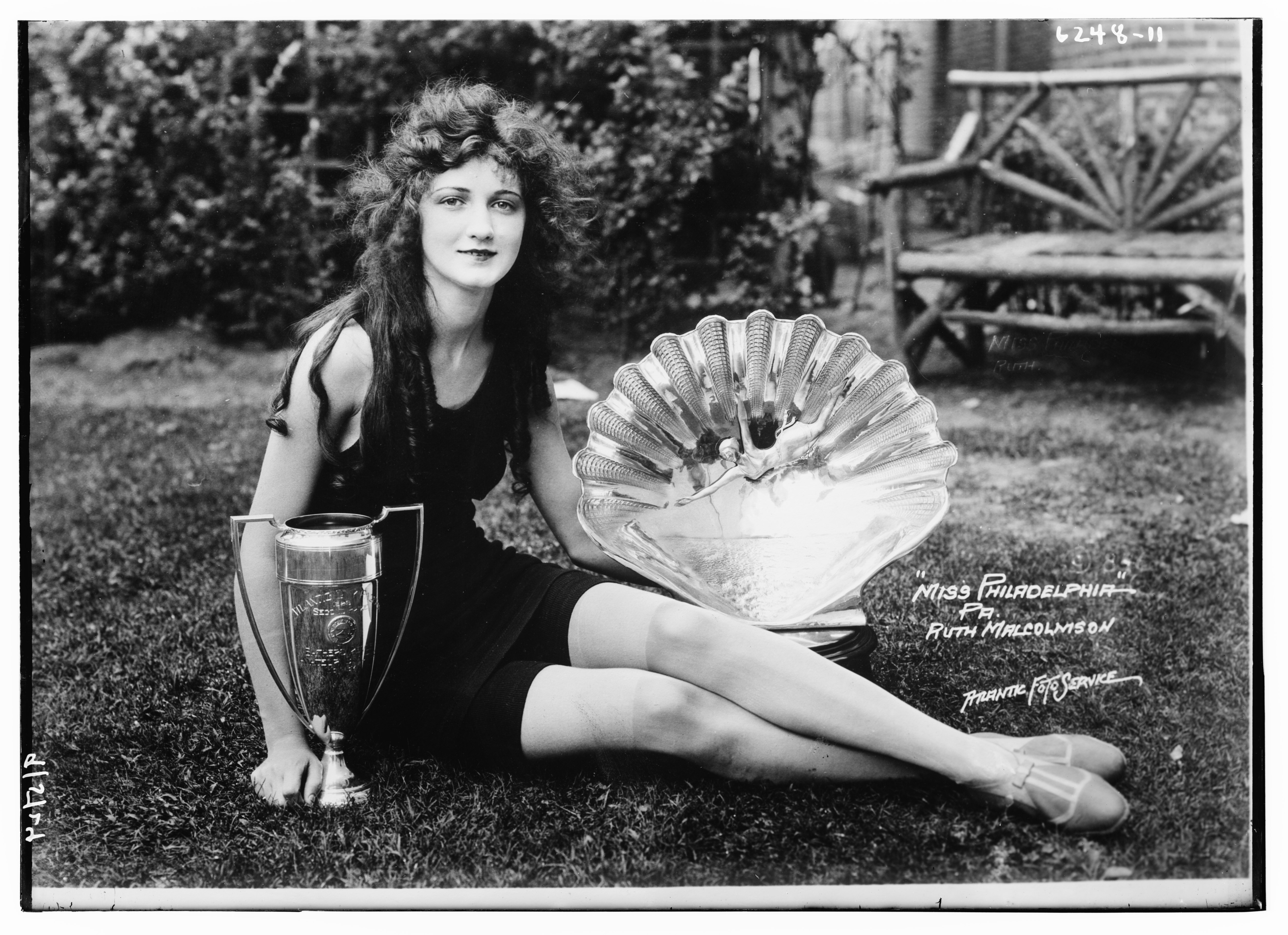
- Ruth Malcomson as Miss Philadelphia in 1924
- Born: April 16, 1906; Philadelphia, Pennsylvania, U.S.
- Died: May 25, 1988 (aged 82); Drexel Hill, Pennsylvania, U.S.
- Title: Miss Philadelphia 1924; Miss America 1924
- Term: September 6, 1924 – September 11, 1925
- Predecessor: Mary Katherine Campbell
- Successor: Fay Lanphier
- Spouse: Carl Schaubel (m. 1931)
- Children: 1

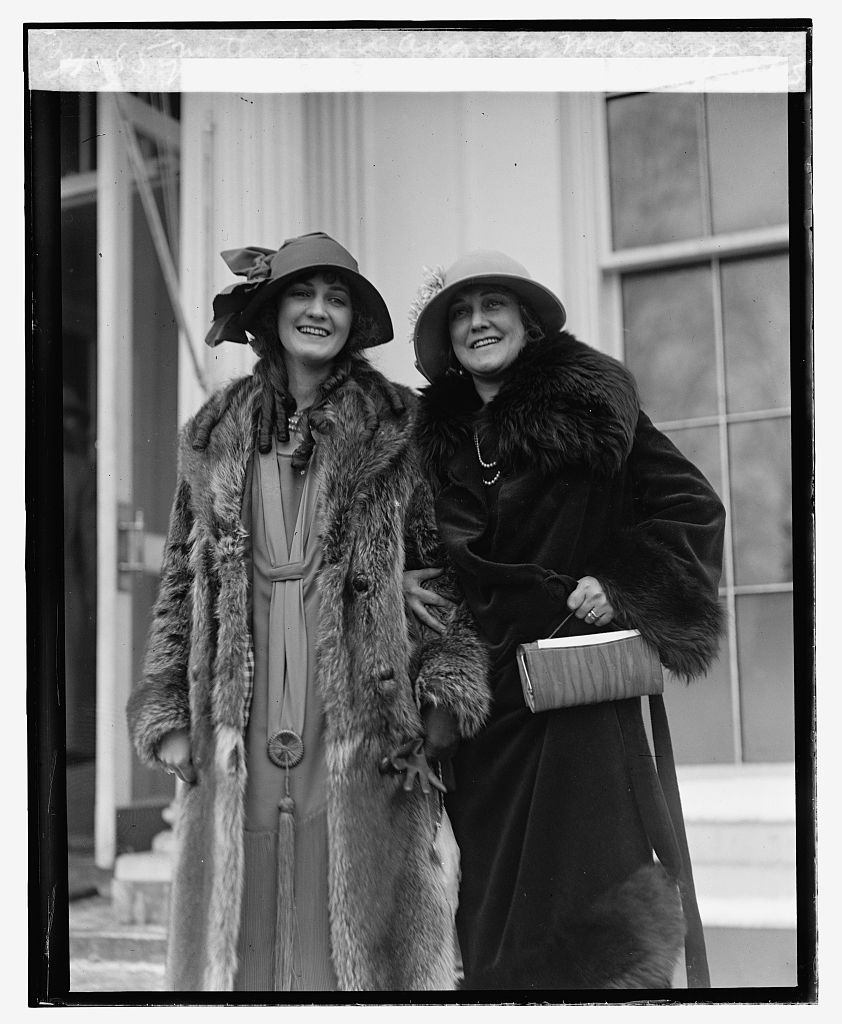
Malcomson (left) with her mother, 1925

Ruth Augusta Malcomson (April 16, 1906 – May 25, 1988) was named Miss America in 1924, earning the title at the age of eighteen.

== Biography ==
Malcomson, a native of Philadelphia, Pennsylvania was the amateur winner in the 1923 contest and returned to defeat incumbent Mary Campbell, who was seeking her third consecutive crown. At the time, the relatively new beauty contest was sometimes still referred to as "The Atlantic City Pageant," with the winner called "The Golden Mermaid."

In a published article following the contest, Malcomson provided others with her ten rules for beauty. Listed briefly, they are:

1. Rise early.
2. Eat a hearty breakfast.
3. Exercise.
4. No alcohol.
5. Smoking is detrimental.
6. Get outdoors.
7. Eat a light lunch.
8. Eat a satisfying dinner.
9. Early to bed.
10. Sleep.

Her niece, Lorna Ringler Graham, was Miss Pennsylvania 1956 (and a non-finalist talent winner at the 1956 Miss America pageant), and Ruth's grand-niece, Jodi Meade Graham, was Miss Delaware 1981, who did not place or win awards at the 1981 Miss America competition in Atlantic City, New Jersey.

Malcomson died in Drexel Hill, Pennsylvania on May 25, 1988 at age 82.

Awards and achievements
Preceded by Mary Katherine Campbell	Miss America; 1924	Succeeded by Fay Lanphier
Preceded by Marion Green	Miss Philadelphia; 1924	Succeeded by Annette Jackson
