= Fay Lanphier =

American actress

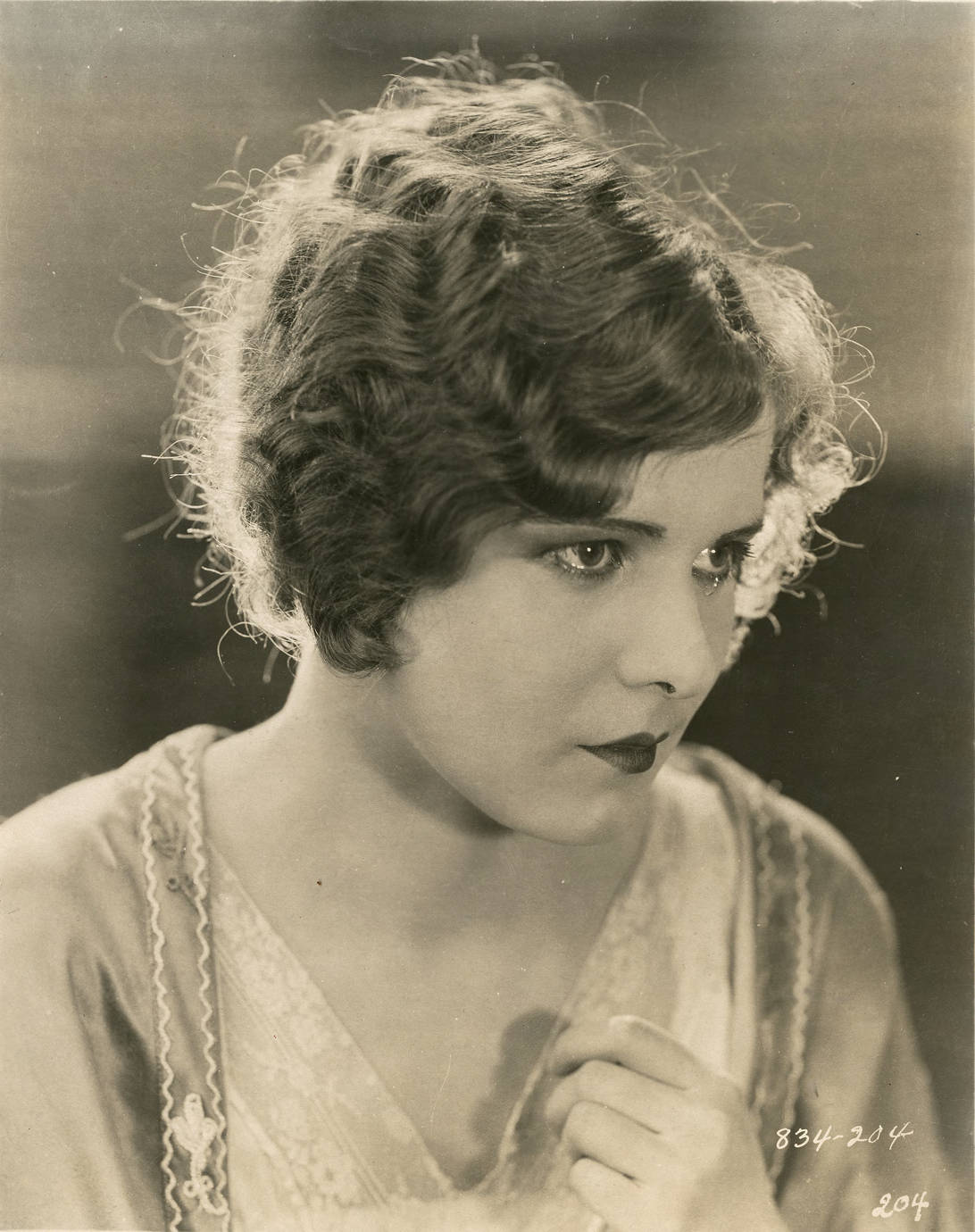
- Lanphier in 1926
- Born: Fay Elinora Lanphier; December 12, 1905; El Dorado, California, US
- Died: June 21, 1959 (aged 53); Orinda, California, U.S.
- Resting place: Mountain View Cemetery
- Other name: Fay Daniels
- Education: Oakland High School
- Title: 1925 Rose Queen; Miss Santa Cruz 1924; Miss California 1925; Miss America 1925
- Term: September 11, 1925 – September 10, 1926
- Predecessor: Ruth Malcomson
- Successor: Norma Smallwood
- Spouses: Sidney M. Spiegel (m. 1928; div. 1929) Winfield Daniels (m. 1931–1959)
- Children: 2

Fay Elinora Lanphier (December 12, 1905 – June 21, 1959) was an American model and actress most noted for winning the title of Miss Santa Cruz in 1924 and then Miss California and Miss America in 1925.

== Early life ==
Lanphier was born in El Dorado, California, the eldest child of six born to Percival Caspar Lanphier and Emily Elenora Olson. Her family later moved to Alameda, California. Lanphier's father died before she was a teenager. She graduated from Oakland High School in 1924 and was saving money to go to business college. In December 1924, Lanphier signed a contract with Max Graf to star in a series of shorts produced on the San Francisco Peninsula.

== Career ==
=== Pageantry ===
She was the 1925 Rose Queen. To date, she is the only person to hold both titles at the same time. She is also the first Miss California to become Miss America. Before she was Miss California, she was Miss Santa Cruz 1924. Lanphier won Miss America in 1925 on a vote of 12–3.

=== Film career ===
Lanphier appeared in the Paramount Pictures film The American Venus (1926) which featured a beauty contest, and co-starred Louise Brooks, and performed for a short time on stage in San Francisco with the Henry Duffy Players.

== Personal life ==
On June 8, 1928, Lanphier married Sidney M. Spiegel, son of Joseph Spiegel, in Chicago. They divorced after six months of marriage.

In 1931, she married high-school sweetheart Winfield Daniels, with whom she had two daughters. They remained married until her death in 1959.

== Later years and death ==
After her second marriage, Lanphier largely retired from public life and became a housewife and mother. She lived in the Oakland, California suburb of Orinda until her death from hepatitis and viral pneumonia at age 53 on June 21, 1959.

On June 24, 1959, Lanphier was interred at the Outdoor Mausoleum at the Mountain View Cemetery in Oakland, California.

Awards and achievements
Preceded by Ruth Malcomson	Miss America; 1925	Succeeded by Norma Smallwood
Preceded by --	Miss California; 1925	Succeeded by Bertha Wiezel
