= Margaret Gorman =

First Miss America winner

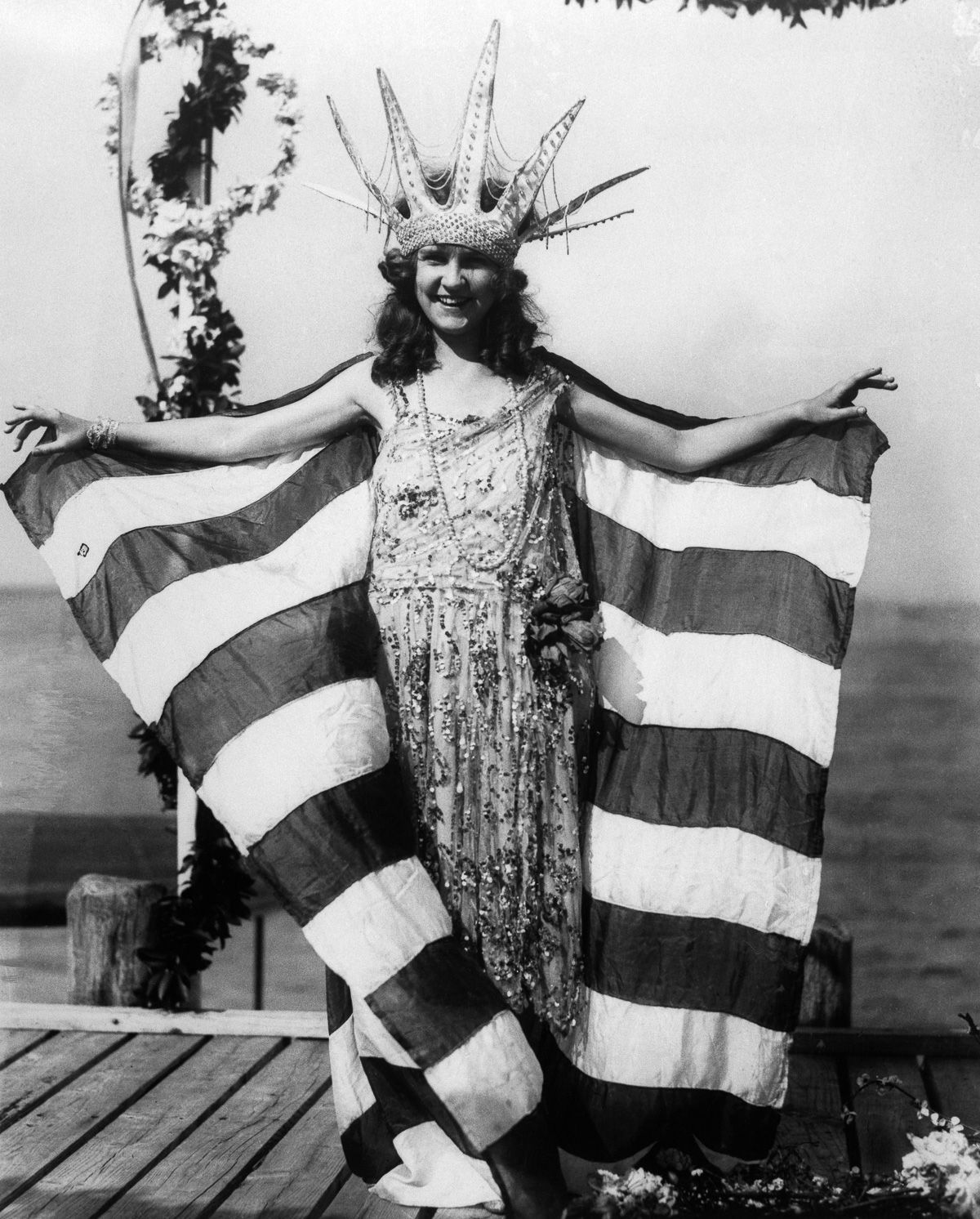
- Gorman in 1921
- Born: August 18, 1905; Washington, D.C., U.S.
- Died: October 1, 1995 (aged 90); Bowie, Maryland, U.S.
- Title: Miss Washington, D.C. 1921; Miss America 1921
- Term: September 8, 1921 – September 7, 1922
- Predecessor: --
- Successor: Mary Katherine Campbell
- Spouse: Victor Cahill (m. 1925; died 1957)

Margaret Gorman (August 18, 1905 – October 1, 1995) was an American model and beauty queen who was the winner of the first Miss America beauty pageant after being crowned Miss District of Columbia in 1921.

== Pageantry ==
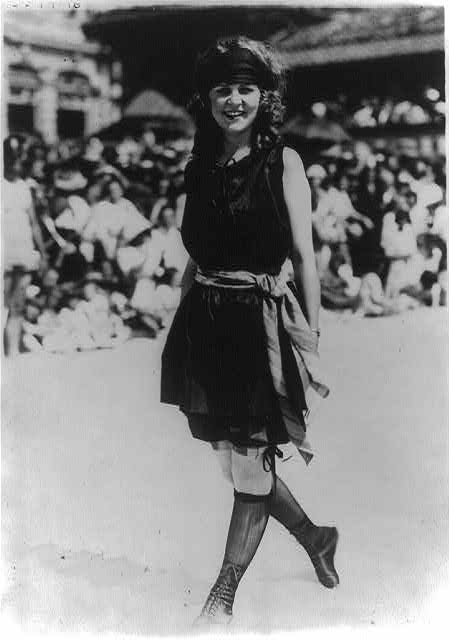
Margaret Gorman wins first prize, Atlantic City.

Gorman was a junior at Western High School in Washington, D.C., when her photo was entered into a popularity contest at the Washington Herald.

She was chosen as Miss District of Columbia in 1921 at age 16 on account of her athletic ability, past accomplishments, and outgoing personality. As a result of that victory, she was invited to join the Second Annual Atlantic City pageant held September 7-8, 1921, as an honored guest. There she was invited to join a new event: the "Inter-City Beauty" Contest. She won the titles "Inter-City Beauty, Amateur" and "The Most Beautiful Bathing Girl in America" after competing in the Bather's Revue. She won the grand prize, the Golden Mermaid trophy. She was crowned as "Miss America." She is the only Miss America to receive her crown at the end of the year.

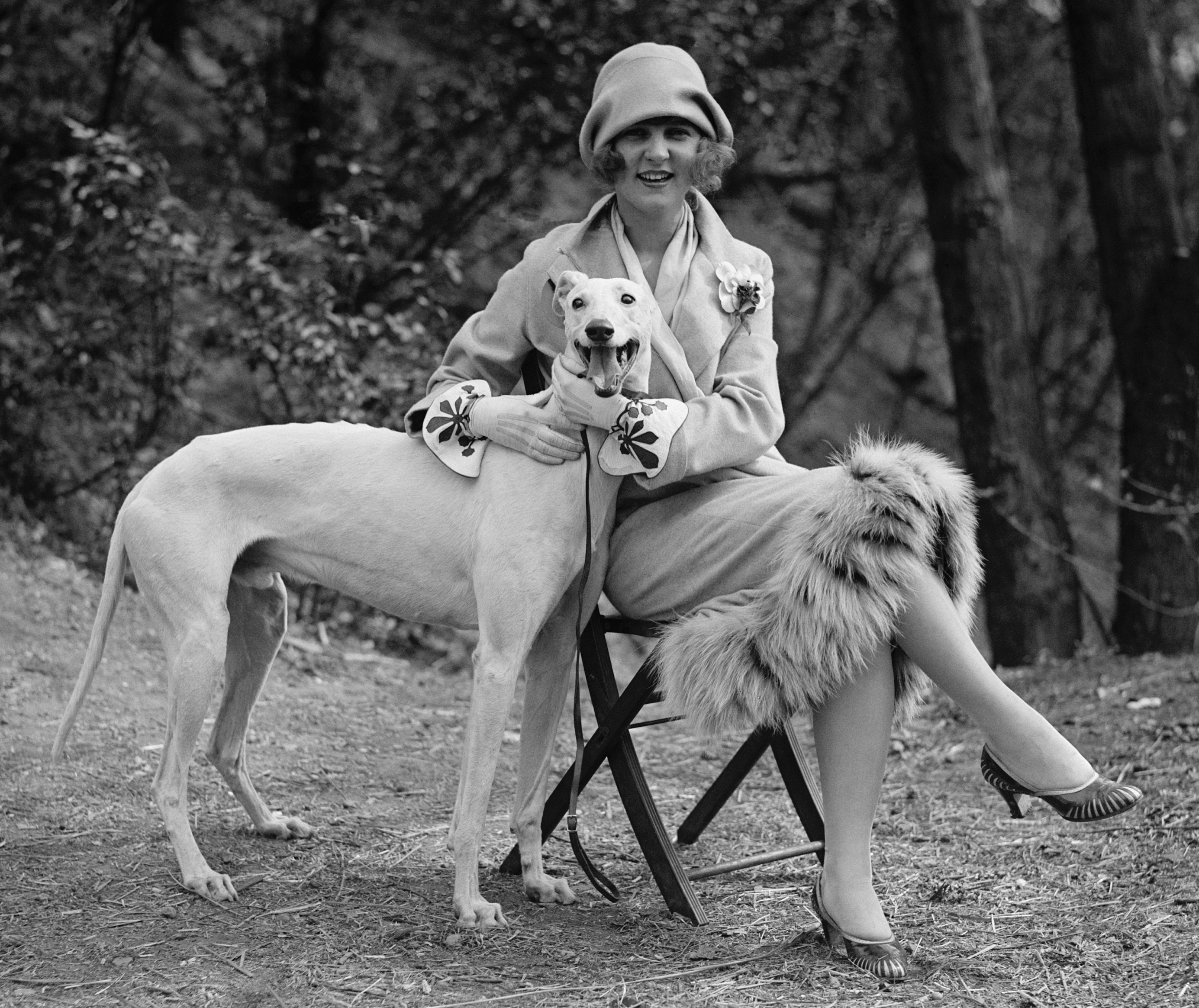
Margaret Gorman with her pet Greyhound, "Long Goodie", in April 1925

Gorman was the lightest Miss America at 108 pounds until 1949, when Jacque Mercer of Phoenix, Arizona, weighed in at 106 and won the title.

Gorman later said: "I never cared to be Miss America. It wasn't my idea. I am so bored by it all. I really want to forget the whole thing." She still owned the sea green chiffon and sequined dress that she wore in the 1922 competition.

== Personal life ==
Gorman continued to compete in 1922. In 1925, she married Victor Cahill; he died in 1957. She lived all her life in Washington, D.C., became a socialite, and enjoyed traveling.

She died on October 1, 1995, aged 90.

Awards and achievements
Preceded by --	Miss America; 1921	Succeeded by Mary Katherine Campbell
Preceded by --	Miss Washington, D.C. 1921	Succeeded by Evelyn C. Lewis
