= Texas's 1st House of Representatives district =

American legislative district

Texas's 1st State House of Representatives district
- Representative: Vacant
- Demographics: 65.9% White; 21.6% Black; 7.8% Hispanic; 1.3% Asian; 3.4% Other
- Population (2020) • Voting age: 194,995; 150,743

District 1 is a district in the Texas House of Representatives. It was created in the 3rd legislature (1849–1851).

The district has been vacant since September 2026. Republican Gary VanDeaver represented the district from 2015 until his resignation. Chris Spencer (R) won the 2026 election and will take office in January 2027.

As a result of redistricting after the 2020 Federal census, from the 2022 elections the district encompasses all of Bowie, Cass, Lamar, Morris, and Red River Counties. Major cities in the district include Atlanta, Douglasville, Linden, New Boston, Paris, and Texarkana.

== Elections ==
=== 2022 ===
VanDeaver was unopposed in the 2022 General Election.

2022 Republican Primary
Party	Candidate	Votes	%
Republican	Gary VanDeaver	13,279	62.88%
Republican	George Lavender	6,115	28.96%
Republican	Ray Null	1,723	8.16%
Total votes		21,117	100%

=== 2020 ===
2020 General Election
Party	Candidate	Votes	%
Republican	Gary VanDeaver	59,508	100%
Total votes		59,508	100%

2020 Republican Primary Election
Party	Candidate	Votes	%
Republican	Gary VanDeaver	20,232	100%
Total votes		20,232	100%

=== 2018 ===
As no candidate filed to run against VanDeaver, no primary election was held for the seat.

2018 General Election
Party	Candidate	Votes	%
Republican	Gary VanDeaver	43,340	100%
Total votes		43,340	100%

=== 2016 ===
2016 General Election
Party	Candidate	Votes	%
Republican	Gary VanDeaver	49,840	100%
Total votes		49,840	100%

2016 Republican Primary
Party	Candidate	Votes	%
Republican	Gary VanDeaver	18,291	61.93%
Republican	George Lavender	11,246	38.07%
Total votes		29,537	100%

=== 2014 ===
2014 General Election
Party	Candidate	Votes	%
Republican	Gary VanDeaver	29,585	100%
Total votes		29,585	100%

2014 Republican Primary
Party	Candidate	Votes	%
Republican	Gary VanDeaver	9,406	54.34%
Republican	George Lavender	7,903	45.66%
Total votes		17,309	100%

=== 2012 ===
2012 General Election
Party	Candidate	Votes	%
Republican	George Lavender	42,080	82.64%
Libertarian	Tim Eason	8,839	17.36%
Total votes		50,919	100%

2010 Republican Primary
Party	Candidate	Votes	%
Republican	George Lavender	12,425	100%
Total votes		12,425	100%

=== 2010 ===
2010 General Election
Party	Candidate	Votes	%
Republican	George Lavender	18,575	51.51%
Democratic	Stephen J. Frost	14,717	40.81%
Independent	Trent E. Gale	2,766	7.67%
Total votes		83,763	100%

2010 Democratic Primary
Party	Candidate	Votes	%
Democratic	Stephen J. Frost	8,274	100%
Total votes		8,274	100%

2010 Republican Primary
Party	Candidate	Votes	%
Republican	George Lavender	4,133	51.95%
Republican	Jack Ballard	3,822	48.05%
Total votes		7,955	100%

=== 2008 ===
2008 General Election
Party	Candidate	Votes	%
Democratic	Stephen J. Frost	29,598	53.59%
Republican	George Lavender	24,853	45.00%
Libertarian	Tim Eason	781	1.41%
Total votes		55,232	100%

2008 Democratic Primary
Party	Candidate	Votes	%
Democratic	Stephen J. Frost	18,549	100%
Total votes		18,549	100%

2008 Republican Primary
Party	Candidate	Votes	%
Republican	George Lavender	6,669	100%
Total votes		6,669	100%

=== 2006 ===
2006 General Election
Party	Candidate	Votes	%
Democratic	Stephen J. Frost	21,841	86.79%
Libertarian	Tim Eason	3,324	13.21%
Total votes		25,165	100%

2006 Democratic Primary
Party	Candidate	Votes	%
Democratic	Stephen J. Frost	7,418	100%
Total votes		7,418	100%

=== 2004 ===
2004 General Election
Party	Candidate	Votes	%
Democratic	Stephen J. Frost	28,495	52.81%
Republican	H.E. (Pete) Snow	25,463	47.19%
Total votes		53,958	100%

2004 Democratic Primary
Party	Candidate	Votes	%
Democratic	Stephen J. Frost	10,761	58.31%
Democratic	Lynn Davis	7,694	41.69%
Total votes		18,455	100%

2004 Republican Primary
Party	Candidate	Votes	%
Republican	H.E. (Pete) Snow	2,218	55.37%
Republican	Marcus (Mark) Graves	1,788	44.63%
Total votes		4,006	100%

=== 2002 ===
2002 General Election
Party	Candidate	Votes	%
Democratic	Barry B. Telford	20,627	62.05%
Republican	Dan Teafatiller	12,615	37.95%
Total votes		33,242	100%

2002 Democratic Primary
Party	Candidate	Votes	%
Democratic	Gary English	6,943	36.29%
Democratic	Barry B. Telford	12,190	63.71%
Total votes		19,133	100%

2002 Republican Primary
Party	Candidate	Votes	%
Republican	Dan Teafatiller	930	100%
Total votes		930	100%

=== 2000 ===
2000 General Election
Party	Candidate	Votes	%
Democratic	Barry B. Telford	29,989	100%
Total votes		29,989	100%

2000 Democratic Primary
Party	Candidate	Votes	%
Democratic	Barry B. Telford	15,017	100%
Total votes		15,017	100%

=== 1998 ===
1998 General Election
Party	Candidate	Votes	%
Democratic	Barry B. Telford	18,237	100%
Total votes		18,237	100%

1998 Democratic Primary
Party	Candidate	Votes	%
Democratic	Barry B. Telford	8,093	100%
Total votes		8,093	100%

=== 1996 ===
1996 General Election
Party	Candidate	Votes	%
Democratic	Barry B. Telford	24,728	63.77%
Republican	George Lavender	14,050	36.23%
Total votes		38,778	100%

1996 Democratic Primary
Party	Candidate	Votes	%
Democratic	Barry B. Telford	15,193	100%
Total votes		15,193	100%

1996 Republican Primary
Party	Candidate	Votes	%
Republican	George Lavender	2,180	100%
Total votes		2,180	100%

=== 1994 ===
1994 General Election
Party	Candidate	Votes	%
Democratic	Barry B. Telford	22,036	100%
Total votes		22,036	100%

1994 Democratic Primary
Party	Candidate	Votes	%
Democratic	Barry B. Telford	11,350	100%
Total votes		11,350	100%

=== 1992 ===
1992 General Election
Party	Candidate	Votes	%
Democratic	Barry B. Telford	30,216	100%
Total votes		30,216	100%

1992 Democratic Primary
Party	Candidate	Votes	%
Democratic	Barry B. Telford	15,893	100%
Total votes		15,893	100%

== List of representatives ==
Leg.	Portrait	Representative	Party	Term start	Term end	Counties represented
3rd	[data missing]	Burrell P. Smith	?	November 5, 1849	November 3, 1851	Red River
4th	[data missing]	Napoleon B. Charlton	?	November 3, 1851	November 7, 1853	Jefferson, Tyler
5th		Hardin R. Runnels	?	November 7, 1853	November 5, 1855	Bowie
6th	[data missing]	Howell W. Runnels Sr.	?	November 21, 1855	November 2, 1857	Bowie
7th	[data missing]	Howell W. Runnels Sr.	?	November 2, 1857	November 7, 1859	Bowie
8th		Solomon H. Pirkey	?	November 12, 1859	March 18, 1861	Bowie
9th		Edward B. Pickett	?	November 4, 1861	March 1, 1862	Chambers, Jefferson, Liberty, Orange
9th	[data missing]	Isaiah Junker	?	February 2, 1863	November 2, 1863	Chambers, Jefferson, Liberty, Orange
10th		Frederick F. Foscue	?	November 2, 1863	August 6, 1866	Chambers, Jefferson, Liberty, Orange
11th		Ambrose D. Kent	?	August 7, 1866	February 7, 1870	Chambers, Jefferson, Liberty, Orange
12th		Thomas J. Chambers	Democratic	February 8, 1870	January 14, 1873	Chambers, Hardin, Jasper, Jefferson, Liberty, Newton, Orange, Polk, Tyler
12th		Joseph G. Smyth	Democratic	February 10, 1870	January 14, 1873	Chambers, Hardin, Jasper, Jefferson, Liberty, Newton, Orange, Polk, Tyler
12th		W. T. Simmons	?	February 16, 1870	January 14, 1873	Chambers, Hardin, Jasper, Jefferson, Liberty, Newton, Orange, Polk, Tyler
13th		James Armstrong	Democratic	January 14, 1873	January 13, 1874	Chambers, Hardin, Jasper, Jefferson, Liberty, Newton, Orange, Polk, Tyler
13th		Henry H. Ford	Democratic	January 14, 1873	January 13, 1874	Chambers, Hardin, Jasper, Jefferson, Liberty, Newton, Orange, Polk, Tyler
13th		Arthur T. Watts	Democratic	January 14, 1873	January 13, 1874	Chambers, Hardin, Jasper, Jefferson, Liberty, Newton, Orange, Polk, Tyler
14th		James B. Simpson	Democratic	January 13, 1874	April 18, 1876	Chambers, Hardin, Jasper, Jefferson, Liberty, Newton, Orange, Polk, Tyler
14th		Dan Triplett	Democratic	January 13, 1874	April 18, 1876	Chambers, Hardin, Jasper, Jefferson, Liberty, Newton, Orange, Polk, Tyler
14th 15th		Pinkney S. Watts	Democratic	January 13, 1874	April 18, 1876	Chambers, Hardin, Jasper, Jefferson, Liberty, Newton, Orange, Polk, Tyler
14th 15th		Pinkney S. Watts	Democratic	April 18, 1876	January 14, 1879	Chambers, Hardin, Jefferson, Liberty
16th		James W. Carlton	Democratic	January 14, 1879	January 11, 1881	Chambers, Hardin, Jefferson, Liberty
17th		William L. Douglass	Democratic	January 11, 1881	January 9, 1883	Chambers, Hardin, Jefferson, Liberty
18th		William L. Douglass	Democratic	January 9, 1883	January 13, 1885	Chambers, Hardin, Jefferson, Liberty, Orange
19th		Charles F. Stevens	Democratic	January 13, 1885	January 11, 1887	Chambers, Hardin, Jefferson, Liberty, Orange
20th		Hugh E. Jackson	Democratic	January 11, 1887	January 8, 1889	Chambers, Hardin, Jefferson, Liberty, Orange
21st		Jerome Swinford	Democratic	January 8, 1889	January 13, 1891	Chambers, Hardin, Jefferson, Liberty, Orange
22nd		George C. O'Brien	Democratic	January 13, 1891	January 10, 1893	Chambers, Hardin, Jefferson, Liberty, Orange
23rd		F. M. Ball	Democratic	January 10, 1893	January 8, 1895	Bowie
24th		R. D. Harrell	Democratic	January 8, 1895	March 10, 1895	Bowie
24th		Frank M. Brooks	Independent	April 16, 1895	January 12, 1897	Bowie
25th		J. D. Alexander	Democratic	January 12, 1897	January 10, 1899	Bowie
26th		William C. Rochelle	Democratic	January 10, 1899	January 8, 1901	Bowie
27th		William C. Rochelle	Democratic	August 12, 1901	January 13, 1903	Bowie
28th		William C. Rochelle	Democratic	January 13, 1903	January 10, 1905	Bowie
29th		Joseph A. Dodd	Democratic	January 10, 1905	January 8, 1907	Bowie
30th		Joseph A. Dodd	Democratic	January 8, 1907	January 12, 1909	Bowie
31st		Norman Dalby	Democratic	January 12, 1909	January 10, 1911	Bowie
32nd		Lewis Henry	Democratic	January 10, 1911	January 14, 1913	Bowie
33rd		Lewis Henry	Democratic	January 14, 1913	January 12, 1915	Bowie
34th		R. H. Jones	Democratic	January 12, 1915	January 9, 1917	Bowie
35th		R. H. Jones	Democratic	January 9, 1917	January 14, 1919	Bowie
36th		Sid Crumpton	Democratic	January 14, 1919	January 11, 1921	Bowie
37th		Sid Crumpton	Democratic	January 11, 1921	January 9, 1923	Bowie
38th		Joseph A. Dodd	Democratic	January 9, 1923	January 13, 1925	Bowie
39th		William J. Simmons	Democratic	January 13, 1925	January 11, 1927	Bowie
40th		William J. Simmons	Democratic	January 11, 1927	January 8, 1929	Bowie
41st		William J. Simmons	Democratic	January 8, 1929	January 13, 1931	Bowie
42nd		Joseph A. Dodd	Democratic	January 13, 1931	January 10, 1933	Bowie
43rd		Jasper N. Reed	Democratic	January 10, 1933	January 8, 1935	Bowie
44th		Jasper N. Reed	Democratic	January 8, 1935	January 12, 1937	Bowie
45th		Jasper N. Reed	Democratic	January 12, 1937	January 10, 1939	Bowie
46th		Joseph S. White Jr.	Democratic	January 10, 1939	January 14, 1941	Bowie
47th		Jasper N. Reed	Democratic	January 14, 1941	January 12, 1943	Bowie
48th		Winford L. Dunn Sr.	Democratic	January 12, 1943	January 9, 1945	Bowie
49th		Winford L. Dunn Sr.	Democratic	January 9, 1945	January 14, 1947	Bowie
50th		Joe T. Kennington	Democratic	January 14, 1947	January 11, 1949	Bowie
51st		Jim T. Lindsey Sr.	Democratic	January 11, 1949	January 9, 1951	Bowie
52nd		Jim T. Lindsey Sr.	Democratic	January 9, 1951	January 13, 1953	Bowie
53rd		Jim T. Lindsey Sr.	Democratic	January 13, 1953	January 11, 1955	Bowie
54th		Jim T. Lindsey Sr.	Democratic	January 11, 1955	January 8, 1957	Bowie
53rd		Thomas H. Stilwell	Democratic	January 13, 1953	January 11, 1955	Bowie
54th		Thomas H. Stilwell	Democratic	January 11, 1955	January 8, 1957	Bowie
55th		Leslie C. Terrell	Democratic	January 8, 1957	January 13, 1959	Bowie
55th		George W. McCoppin	Democratic	January 8, 1957	January 13, 1959	Bowie
56th		Leslie C. Terrell	Democratic	January 13, 1959	January 10, 1961	Bowie
56th		George W. McCoppin	Democratic	January 13, 1959	January 10, 1961	Bowie
57th		Robert W. Bass	Democratic	January 10, 1961	January 8, 1963	Bowie
57th		George W. McCoppin	Democratic	January 10, 1961	January 8, 1963	Bowie
58th		Robert W. Bass	Democratic	January 8, 1963	January 12, 1965	Bowie
59th		Robert W. Bass	Democratic	January 12, 1965	January 10, 1967	Bowie
60th		Robert W. Bass	Democratic	January 10, 1967	January 14, 1969	Bowie
61st		Ed Howard	Democratic	January 14, 1969	January 12, 1971	Bowie
62nd		Ed Howard	Democratic	January 12, 1971	January 9, 1973	Bowie
63rd		Ed Howard	Democratic	January 9, 1973	January 14, 1975	Bowie, Red River
64th		Hamp Atkinson	Democratic	January 14, 1975	January 11, 1977	Bowie, Red River
65th		Hamp Atkinson	Democratic	January 11, 1977	January 9, 1979	Bowie, Red River
66th		Hamp Atkinson	Democratic	January 9, 1979	January 13, 1981	Bowie, Red River
67th		Hamp Atkinson	Democratic	January 13, 1981	January 11, 1983	Bowie, Red River
68th		Alex H. Short Jr.	Democratic	January 11, 1983	January 8, 1985	Bowie, Red River
69th		Alex H. Short Jr.	Democratic	January 8, 1985	January 13, 1987	Bowie, Red River
70th		Barry B. Telford	Democratic	January 13, 1987	January 10, 1989	Bowie, Cass, Marion, Morris
71st		Barry B. Telford	Democratic	January 10, 1989	January 8, 1991	Bowie, Cass
72nd		Barry B. Telford	Democratic	January 8, 1991	January 12, 1993	Bowie, Cass
73rd		Barry B. Telford	Democratic	January 12, 1993	January 10, 1995	Bowie, Cass
74th		Barry B. Telford	Democratic	January 10, 1995	January 14, 1997	Bowie, Cass
75th		Barry B. Telford	Democratic	January 14, 1997	January 12, 1999	Bowie, Cass
76th		Barry B. Telford	Democratic	January 12, 1999	January 9, 2001	Bowie, Red River
77th		Barry B. Telford	Democratic	January 9, 2001	January 14, 2003	Bowie, Red River
78th		Barry B. Telford	Democratic	January 14, 2003	January 11, 2005	Bowie, Red River
79th		Stephen J. Frost	Democratic	January 11, 2005	January 9, 2007	Bowie, Cass, Marion, Morris
80th		Stephen J. Frost	Democratic	January 9, 2007	January 13, 2009	Bowie, Cass, Marion, Morris
81st		Stephen J. Frost	Democratic	January 13, 2009	January 11, 2011	Bowie, Cass, Marion, Morris
82nd		George Lavender	Republican	January 11, 2011	January 8, 2013	Bowie, Cass, Marion, Morris
83rd		George Lavender	Republican	January 8, 2013	January 13, 2015	Bowie, Cass, Marion, Morris
84th		Gary VanDeaver	Republican	January 13, 2015	January 10, 2017	Bowie, Franklin, Lamar, Red River
85th		Gary VanDeaver	Republican	January 10, 2017	January 8, 2019	Bowie, Franklin, Lamar, Red River
86th		Gary VanDeaver	Republican	January 8, 2019	January 12, 2021	Bowie, Franklin, Lamar, Red River
87th		Gary VanDeaver	Republican	January 12, 2021	January 10, 2023	Bowie, Franklin, Lamar, Red River
88th		Gary VanDeaver	Republican	January 10, 2023	Present	Bowie, Lamar, Red River, Cass, Morris

== Living past representatives ==
Representative	Legislature(s)	Elected time	Birth date and age
Stephen James Frost	79th-81st	6 years	March 30, 1972 (age 52)
George Lavender	82nd-83rd	4 years ± 2 days	September 7, 1955 (aged 69)
