= Miss Louisiana =

Beauty pageant competition

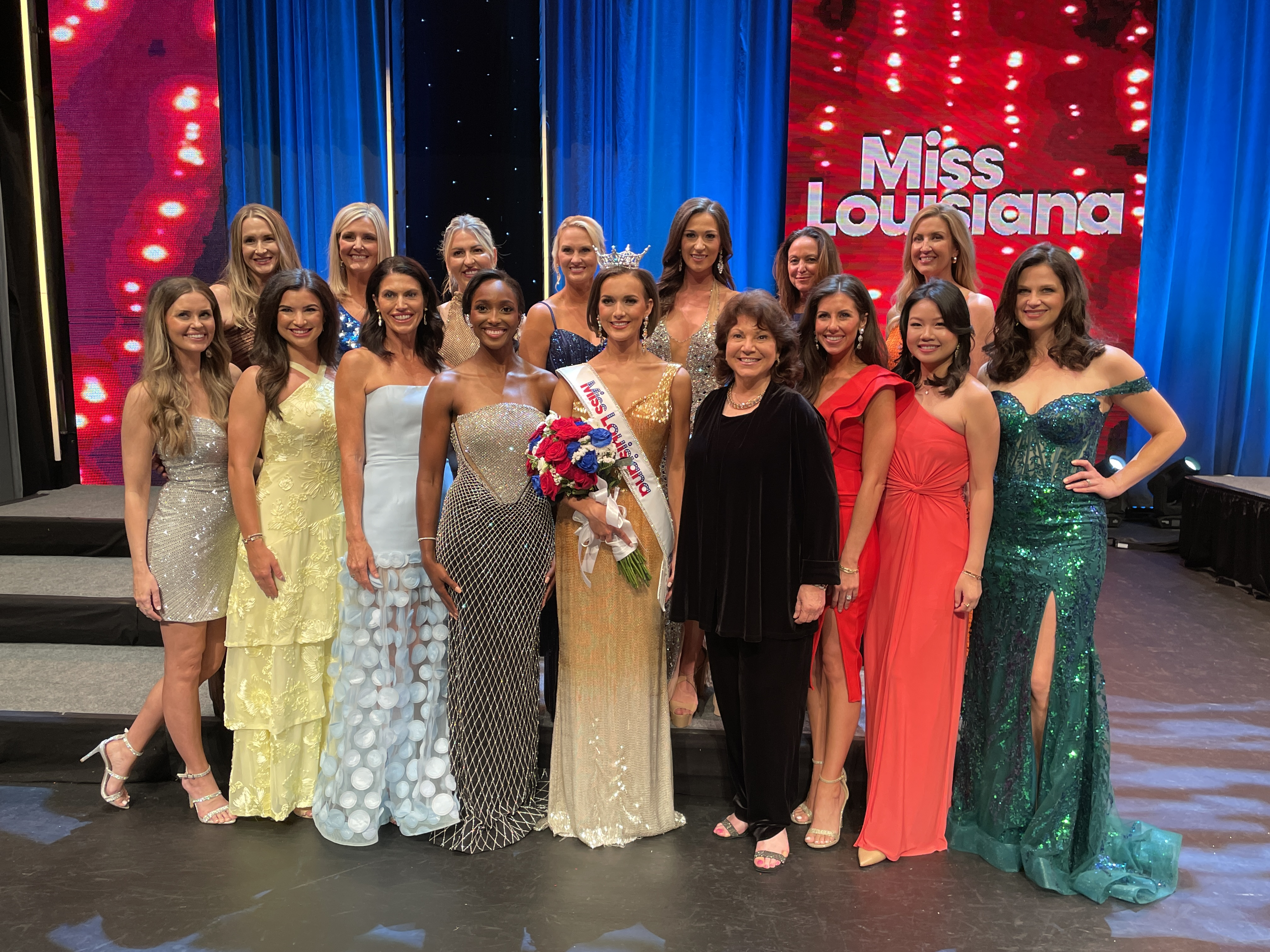
- Miss Louisiana 2026, Shelby Bordelon, with past titleholders.
- Formation: 1922
- Type: Beauty pageant
- Headquarters: Monroe
- Location: Louisiana
- Members: Miss America
- Official language: English
- Website: www.misslouisiana.com

The Miss Louisiana competition is the pageant that selects the representative for the state of Louisiana in the Miss America pageant. Although no delegate from Louisiana has ever won the Miss America title, five have placed 1st runner-up. As of 2026, Louisiana is the lone member of the Confederacy during the Civil War which has not produced a Miss America.

The pageant is held in June at the W. L. Jack Howard Theatre, named for the late Mayor W. L. "Jack" Howard and located in downtown Monroe adjacent to the Civic Center. The 2026 pageant was the 63rd held in Monroe.

Shelby Bordelon of Sunshine was crowned Miss Louisiana 2026 on June 20, 2026, and placed first runner-up at Miss America 2027 in West Palm Beach, Florida on September 6, 2026.

== Gallery of past titleholders ==
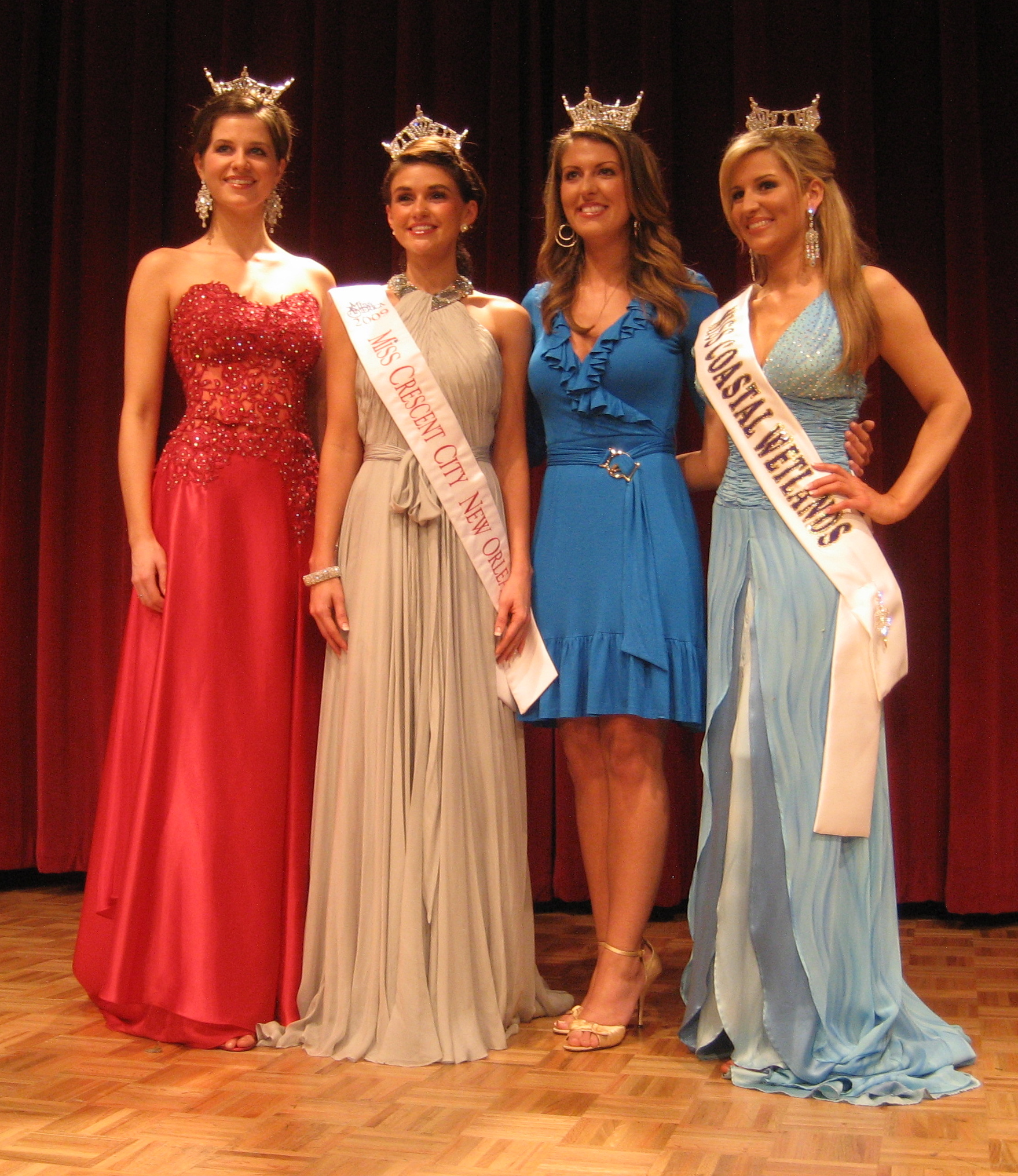
Blair Abene, Miss Louisiana 2008 (second from right) with local titleholders, 2009; Hope Anderson, at left, was to become Miss Louisiana 2011.

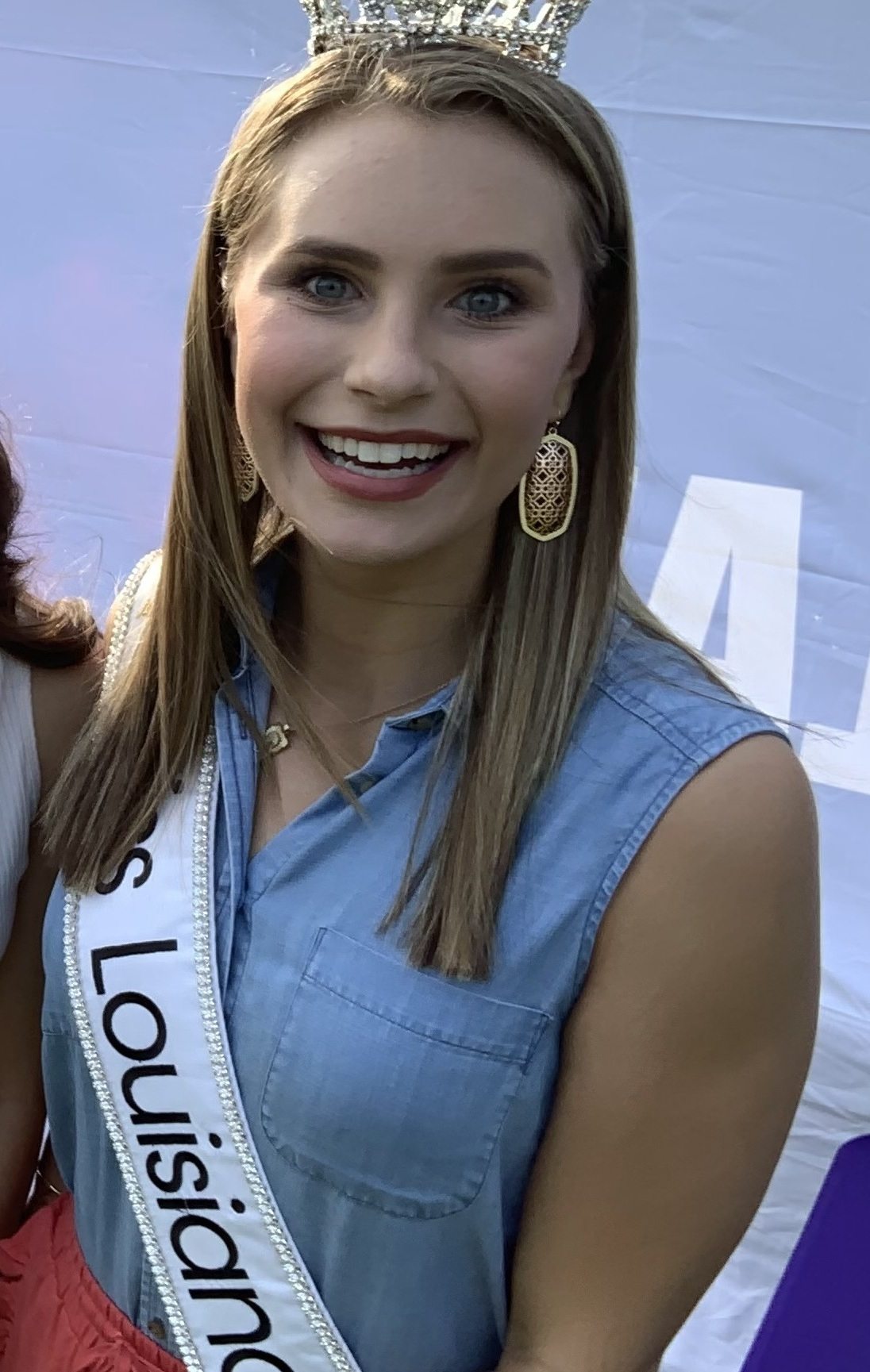
Julia Claire Williams, Miss Louisiana 2021

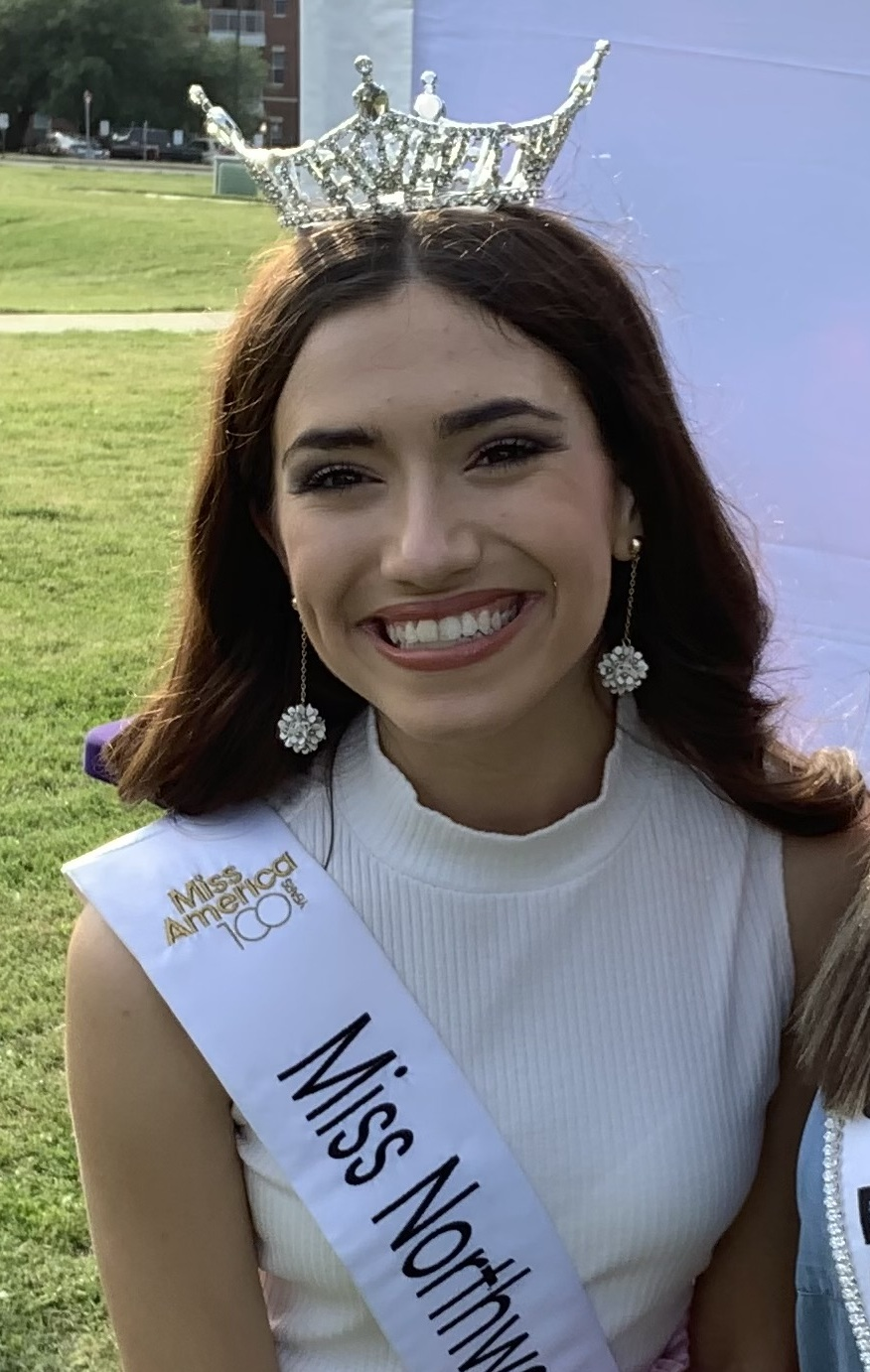
Mackenzie Scroggs, Miss Louisiana 2022

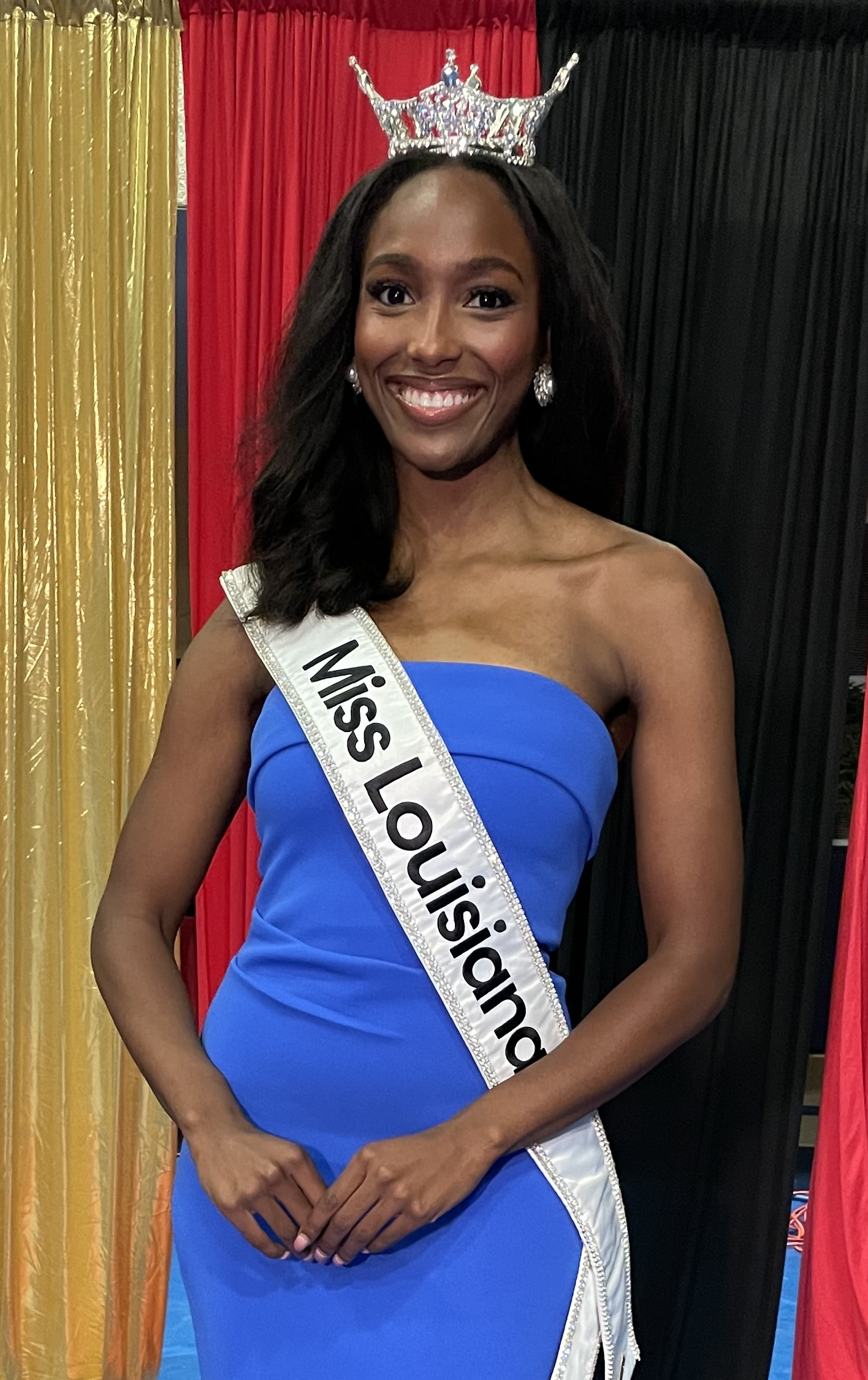
Gabrelle McLeod, Miss Louisiana 2025

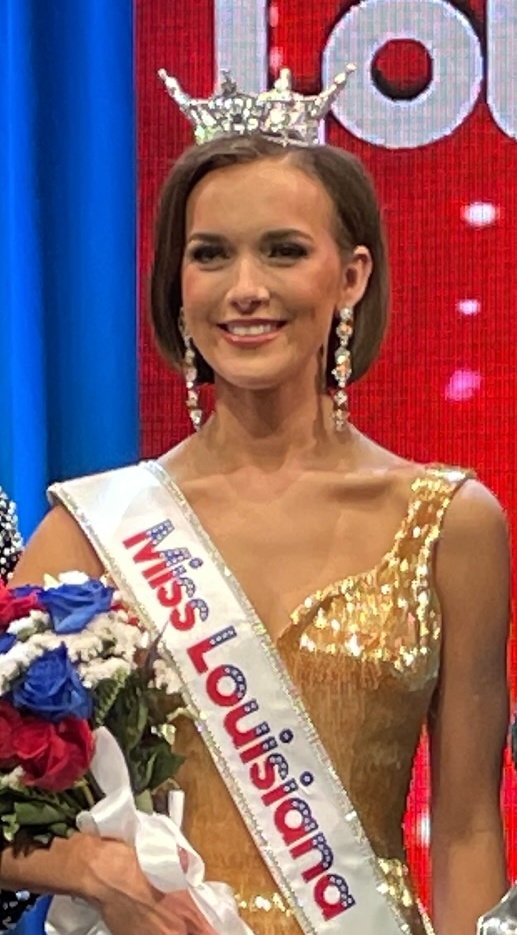
Shelby Bordelon, Miss Louisiana 2026

== Results summary ==
The following is a visual summary of the past results of Miss Louisiana titleholders at the national Miss America pageants/competitions. The year in parentheses indicates the year of the national competition during which a placement and/or award was garnered, not the year attached to the contestant's state title.

=== Placements ===
- 1st runners-up: Patricia Brant (1988), Erika Schwarz (1997), Faith Jenkins (2001), Jennifer Dupont (2005), Shelby Bordelon (2027)
- 2nd runners-up: Holli' Conway (2019)
- 3rd runners-up: Marguerite McClelland (1946), Debra (Debbie) Ward (1974), Katherine Putnam (2010), April Nelson (2016)
- 4th runners-up: Libby Lovejoy (1975), Linnea Fayard (1991)
- Top 7: Laryssa Bonacquisti (2018)
- Top 10: Barbara Barker (1953), Lynda Ferguson (1966), Genevieve Del Gallo (1968), Debby Robert (1973), Phyllis Kelly (1979), Valerie Brosset (1989), Christi Page (1992), Mette Boving (1998), Hope Anderson (2012)
- Top 15: Louise Moore (1924), Justine Ker (2017)
- Top 16: Gertrude Rissie Miller (1937)
- Top 18: Marjorie Hagler (1933)

=== Awards ===
==== Preliminary awards ====
- Preliminary Evening Gown: Shelby Bordelon (2027)
- Preliminary Lifestyle and Fitness: Valerie Brosset (1989), Stacy King (1990), Christi Page (1992), Faith Jenkins (2001), Jennifer Dupont (2005), Laryssa Bonacquisti (2018)
- Preliminary Talent: Debby Robert (1973), Debra (Debbie) Anne Ward (1974), Patricia Brant (1988), Julie Lawrence (2000), Faith Jenkins (2001), April Nelson (2016), Laryssa Bonacquisti (2018), Holli' Conway (2019)

==== Non-finalist awards ====
- Non-finalist Talent: Bobbie Chachere (1957), Cherie Martin (1965), Myrrah McCully (1980), Bobbie Candler (1983), Miriam Gauthier (1984), Amanda Mainord (1987), Stacy King (1990), Karmyn Tyler (1996), Julie Lawrence (2000), Jaden Leach (2014), Meagan Crews (2020), Gracie Reichman (2023)
- Non-finalist Interview: Lacey Sanchez (2015)

==== Other awards ====
- Miss Congeniality: N/A
- Miss America Scholar Award: Julie Lawrence (2000)
- Children's Miracle Network (CMN) Miracle Maker Award: Katherine Putnam (2010), Hope Anderson (2012)
- CMN Miracle Maker Award 2nd runners-up: Lacey Sanchez (2015)
- Quality of Life Award Winners: Faith Jenkins (2001)
- Quality of Life Award 1st runners-up: Heather Dupree (1999)
- Quality of Life Award 2nd runners-up: Erika Schwarz (1997)
- STEM Scholarship 1st runner-up: Julia Claire Williams (2022)
- Show Me Your Shoes Winner: Gabrelle McLeod (2026)

== Winners ==
- Declared as winner
- Ended as a runner-up
- Ended as a finalist or semi-finalist

Year	Name	Hometown	Education	Age	Local Title	Miss America Talent	Placement at Miss America	Special scholarships at Miss America	Notes
2026	Shelby Bordelon	Sunshine	Southeastern Louisiana University	23	Miss Louisiana Port City	Vocal	1st runner-up	Preliminary Evening Gown	
2025	Gabrelle McLeod	Vicksburg, Miss.	ULM	21	Miss Cane River	Vocal		Miss America's Show Me Your Shoes "Best Shoe" Winner	
2024	Olivia Grace George	Ruston	Louisiana Tech University	20	Miss Louisiana Watermelon Festival	Jazz Dance, "Bossa Nova Baby"			
2023	Makenzie Scroggs	Marksville	Northwestern State University	20	Miss Natchitoches City of Lights	Jazz Dance			
2022	Gracie Reichman	Colfax	Louisiana Tech University	21	Miss Louisiana Watermelon Festival	Clogging		Non-finalist Talent Award	Previously Miss Louisiana's Outstanding Teen 2018
2021	Julia Claire Williams	Kinder	ULM	22	Miss Heart of Pilot	Dance, "Last Dance"		STEM Scholarship 1st runner-up	Previously Miss Louisiana's Outstanding Teen 2015
2020	Courtney Hammons	Choudrant	Louisiana Tech University	23	Miss Louisiana Tech	No talent competition	Did not compete; 1st runner-up at Miss Louisiana 2019 pageant, later assumed the 2020 title to finish Crews's reign after the former had to continue her education; 2020 state pageant was cancelled due to the COVID-19 pandemic		
2019	Meagan Crews	Bossier City	LSU Shreveport	22	Miss Louisiana Watermelon Festival	Vocal, "I Will Always Love You"		Non-Finalist Talent Award	Previously Miss Louisiana's Outstanding Teen 2014
2018	Holli' Conway	Monroe	Northwestern State University	23	Miss Heart of Pilot	Vocal, "I Believe"	2nd runner-up	Preliminary Talent Award	Appeared as an alternate in the Broadway production of SIX: The Musical Appeared in the Broadway production of TINA: The Tina Turner Musical
2017	Laryssa Bonacquisti	Baton Rouge	LSU	22	Miss Shreveport	Ventriloquism, "I Wanna Be a Cowboy Sweetheart"	Top 7	Preliminary Lifestyle and Fitness Award Preliminary Talent Award	Daughter of Miss New Jersey 1990, Lynette Falls Bonacquisti
2016	Justine Ker	Ruston	Vanderbilt University	22	Miss Louisiana Watermelon Festival	Classical Piano	Top 15		Cousin of Miss California 2013 and 1st runner-up at Miss America 2014, Crystal Lee Previously Miss Louisiana's Outstanding Teen 2011
2015	April Nelson	Mandeville	OCU	23	Miss Crescent City New Orleans	Vocal, "Climb Ev'ry Mountain" from The Sound of Music	3rd runner-up	Preliminary Talent Award	Previously Miss Louisiana's Outstanding Teen 2008
2014	Lacey Sanchez	Baton Rouge	LSU / Southeastern Louisiana University	24	Miss Lafayette	Vocal, "Not for the Life of Me" from Thoroughly Modern Millie		CMN Miracle Maker 2nd runner-up Non-finalist Interview Award	
2013	Jaden Leach	West Monroe	ULM	20	Miss Spirit of the Ouachita	Vocal, "I Can't Let Go" from Smash		Non-finalist Talent Award	
2012	Lauren Vizza	Shreveport	Louisiana Tech	22	Miss Louisiana Tech	Dance, "The Time of My Life" by David Cook			Later Miss Louisiana USA 2018
2011	Hope Anderson	Monroe	ULM / Louisiana Tech	22	Miss Spirit of Ruston	Dance, "Sway"	Top 10	CMN Miracle Maker Award	Contestant at National Sweetheart 2009 pageant
2010	Kelsi Crain	Monroe	ULM	20	Miss ULM	Ballet en Pointe, "Victory"			
2009	Katherine Putnam	Oak Grove	ULM	23	Miss Shreveport	Piano, "Hallelujah Chorus" from Handel's Messiah	3rd runner-up	CMN Miracle Maker Award	
2008	Blair Abene	Hammond	Southeastern Louisiana	22	Miss Lincoln Parish	Classical Vocal, "Nessun dorma"			Previously Miss Teen Louisiana 2002 Top 10 at National Sweetheart 2006 pageant
2007	Amanda Joseph	Pineville	LSU / UL Monroe	21	Miss Bossier City	Ballet en Pointe, "Canned Heat"			
2006	Jamie Wilson	Minden	Louisiana Tech / LSU Law	23	Miss Louisiana Watermelon Festival	Vocal, "Like We Never Loved at All"			Contestant at National Sweetheart 2005 pageant
2005	Molly Causey	Ruston	Louisiana Tech / LSU	22	Miss Shreveport	Piano, "Hungarian Rhapsody No. 2" by Franz Liszt			Previously Miss Teen Louisiana 1999 Contestant at National Sweetheart 2004 pageant
2004	Jennifer Dupont	Plaquemine	LSU	23	Miss Ouachita Parish	Jazz Dance, "The Life of the Party" from The Wild Party	1st runner-up	Preliminary Swimsuit Award	Triple Crown Winner: Previously Miss Louisiana Teen USA 1998; Previously Miss Louisiana USA 2000
2003	Melissa Clark	Ruston	Louisiana Tech	23	Miss Louisiana Tech	Vocal, "The Prayer"			Previously Miss Teen Louisiana 1998 Contestant at National Sweetheart 2000 pageant Previously National Sweetheart 2001
2002	Casey Crowder	Shreveport	Northwestern State	23	Miss Ark-La-Miss Fair	Vocal Medley, "This Can't Be Love" & "Almost Like Being in Love"			Previously Miss Teen Louisiana 1995
2001	Kati Guyton	Bossier City	Ouachita Baptist / LSU Shreveport	23	Miss Louisiana Watermelon Festival	Vocal, "Your Daddy's Son" from Ragtime			Previously Miss Teen Louisiana 1996
2000	Faith Jenkins	Shreveport	Louisiana Tech / Southern Law	24	Miss Louisiana Lagniappe	Vocal, "If I Could"	1st runner-up	Preliminary Talent Award Preliminary Swimsuit Award Quality of Life Award	
1999	Julie Lawrence	Destrehan	New Orleans	22	Miss Louisiana Stock Show	Ballet en Pointe, "I, Don Quixote" from Man of La Mancha		Miss America Scholar Non-finalist Talent Award Preliminary Talent Award	Contestant at National Sweetheart 1998 pageant
1998	Heather Dupree	Baton Rouge	LSU	21	Miss Louisiana Lagniappe	Ventriloquism, "Sold (The Grundy County Auction Incident)"		Quality of Life Award 1st runner-up	Previously Miss Louisiana Teen USA 1993
1997	Mette Boving	Ruston	Louisiana Tech	24	Miss Holiday in Dixie	Popular Vocal, "How Do I Live"	Top 10		Later Mrs. Colorado 2015
1996	Erika Schwarz	Folsom	Loyola	24	Miss St. Tammany Parrish	Original Piano Composition, "New Orleans Rhapsody"	1st runner-up	Quality of Life Award 2nd runner-up	Judge for the Miss America 2006 pageant
1995	Karmyn Tyler	Shreveport	Centenary / Texarkana College / TAMU–Texarkana	20	Miss City of Roses	Classical Vocal, "Tu che di gel sei cinta"		Non-finalist Talent Award	
1994	Tiffany Mock	Bossier City	Northeast Louisiana	23	Miss Shreveport	Vocal, "Zing! Went the Strings of My Heart"			
1993	Catherine Teague	Shreveport	Louisiana Tech	20	Miss Natchitoches City of Lights	Vocal, "Listen To My Heart"			
1992	Elizabeth Haynes	Baton Rouge	Louisiana Tech / LSU	24	Miss Caddo Lake	Piano Medley, "El Cumbanchero" & "Cumana"			
1991	Christi Page	Ruston	Louisiana Tech	21	Miss Caney Lake	Piano / Vocal, "Great Balls of Fire"	Top 10	Preliminary Swimsuit Award	
1990	Linnea Fayard	Shreveport	LSU Shreveport / Louisiana Tech	22	Miss Louisiana Super Derby Festival	Vocal, "Stormy Weather"	4th runner-up		
1989	Stacy King	Slidell	Louisiana Tech	23	Miss Louisiana Deep South	Banjo Medley, "Dueling Banjos" & "Ghost Riders"		Non-finalist Talent Award Preliminary Swimsuit Award	
1988	Valerie Brosset	West Monroe	Northeast Louisiana	21	Miss Louisiana Stockshow	Contemporary Ballet, "Singin' in the Rain"	Top 10	Preliminary Swimsuit Award	
1987	Patricia Brant	Monroe	Northeast Louisiana	23	Miss Red River Valley	Ventriloquism, "Arizona Yodeler" & "Row, Row, Row Your Boat"	1st runner-up	Preliminary Talent Award	
1986	Amanda Mainord	Baton Rouge	LSU	20	Miss Louisiana State University	Vocal, "When You Wish upon a Star"		Non-finalist Talent Award	
1985	Carol Carter	Shreveport	LSU Shreveport	20	Miss Louisiana State University-Shreveport	Vocal, "Corner of the Sky" from Pippin			Later Miss Louisiana USA 1987
1984	Nita Whitaker	Shreveport	Northeast Louisiana	24	Miss Louisiana Forest Festival	Popular Vocal, "Over the Rainbow"			First African American to win Miss Louisiana
1983	Miriam Gauthier	Shreveport		19	Miss Bossier City	Piano, "Toccata" by Antonio Tauriello		Non-finalist Talent Award	
1982	Bobbie Candler	Baton Rouge	LSU	25	Miss Baton Rouge	Semi-classical Vocal, "With a Song in My Heart"		Non-finalist Talent Award	Previously National Sweetheart 1979
1981	Donese Worden	Monroe	Northeast Louisiana	22	Miss Northeast Louisiana University	Violin, "Millionaire's Hoe-Down"			
1980	Martha "Missy" Crews	Baton Rouge	LSU	22	Miss Baton Rouge	Ballet en Pointe, "Jet Song" from West Side Story			
1979	Myrrah McCully	Monroe	LSU	24	Miss North Louisiana Paperland	Piano, "Piano Concerto in D-flat major" by Aram Khachaturian		Non-finalist Talent Award	
1978	Phyllis Kelly	Baton Rouge	Southeastern Louisiana	20	Miss Southeastern Louisiana University	Classical Vocal, "Italian Street Song" from Naughty Marietta	Top 10		Performed national anthem at Super Bowl XII
1977	Donna Holt	Tioga	Louisiana College	21	Miss Plain Dealing Dogwood	Semi-classical Vocal, "My Tribute"			
1976	Candy Sue Crocker	Hammond	Southeastern Louisiana / Northeast Louisiana	22	Miss Plain Dealing Dogwood	Vocal / Tap Dance, "Swanee"			
1975	Becky Wilson	Bossier City	Louisiana Tech	23	Miss Louisiana Watermelon Festival	Vocal, "Corner of the Sky" from Pippin			
1974	Libby Lovejoy	Sulphur	SMU	21	Miss Lake Charles	Classical Ballet en Pointe, "The Grenadiers"	4th runner-up		
1973	Debra (Debbie) Anne Ward	Baton Rouge	LSU	20	Miss Delhi	Vocal Medley, "A Heart That's Free", "I Enjoy Being a Girl", & "I Could Have Danced All Night"	3rd runner-up	Preliminary Talent Award	Featured performer and co-host of the Miss Wisconsin (1975-1979) and Miss America 1974–1977 pageants
1972	Debby Robert	Baton Rouge	LSU	21	Miss Baton Rouge	Classical Vocal, "The Art of Beguiling"	Top 10	Preliminary Talent Award	
1971	Avis Cochran	Shreveport	SHSU / University of Houston–Victoria	19	Miss Shreveport	Acrobatic Dance, Theme from Exodus			
1970	Carol Almand	Haynesville		18	Miss Homer	Vocal, "The Wedding"			
1969	Sharon Branaman	New Iberia	USL	19	Miss Lafayette	Classical Vocal, "Olympia's Aria" from The Tales of Hoffmann			
1968	Susanne Saunders	Shreveport	Northeast Louisiana	18	Miss Northeast Louisiana State College	Popular Vocal, "I Can See It"			
1967	Genevieve Del Gallo	New Orleans	Loyola	21	Miss New Orleans	Classical Vocal, "Un Bel Di" from Madama Butterfly	Top 10		
1966	Joy Woods	New Orleans	Northeast Louisiana	20	Miss Northeast Louisiana State College	Oboe / Dance			
1965	Lynda Ferguson	Shreveport	Centenary	20	Miss Shreveport	Semi-classical Vocal, "Italian Street Song" from Naughty Marietta	Top 10		
1964	Cherie Martin	Pineville	Northeast Louisiana	19	Miss Rapides Parrish	Toreador Dance & Baton Twirling		Non-finalist Talent Award	
1963	Linda Gail Baucum	Springhill		18	Miss Springhill	Modern Jazz/South American Rock-Umba Dance			Contestant at Miss Teenage America 1962 Was originally named first runner-up at Miss Louisiana 1963 pageant Assumed title when original winner, Cathey, resigned
1963	Judith Ann Cathey	West Monroe		20			Unable to compete; resigned moments after being crowned as she was to marry her fiancé in August 1963		
1962	Diana Jane Smith	Oak Ridge	Northeast Louisiana	21	Miss Bastrop	Organ Medley "Lady of Spain" & "Sabre Dance"			
1961	Lyndra Frances Pate	Shreveport	Centenary	20	Miss Bastrop	Vocal, "The House I Live In"			
1960	Judith Ann Coday	Baton Rouge	LSU	20	Miss Baton Rouge	Vocal			
1959	Mary Mills Hawkins	Lake Providence	LSU	22	Miss Baton Rouge	Piano			
1958	Alberta Louise Futch	Hammond	Southeastern Louisiana		Miss Tangipahoa Parish	Fire Baton Twirling			
1957	Beverly Leigh Norman	Shreveport	St. Mary's College		Miss Caddo Parish	Vocal,"My Own True Love"			
1956	Bobbie Donna Chachere	Baton Rouge	LSU	18	Miss Baton Rouge	Dance		Non-finalist Talent Award	
1955	Jan Aline Johnston	Ruston	Louisiana Tech		Miss Ruston	Drama			
1954	Gail Gleason	Shreveport	Louisiana Tech		Miss Louisiana Tech	Piano & Art			
1953	Sonya Lee LeBlanc	Baton Rouge	LSU		Miss Baton Rouge	Dance			
1952	Barbara Barker	Monroe			Miss Monroe	Drama, "The Fog"	Top 10		
1951	Jeanne Thompson	Baton Rouge				Dance			Later Miss Louisiana USA 1952 and 1953 Only woman ever to compete in Miss USA pageant twice
1950	Rowena Raye Taliaferro	Winnsboro	Northwestern State College of Louisiana	22		Piano / Vocal			
1949	Annie Gray Hollingsworth	Baton Rouge	LSU	18					
1948	No Louisianan representative at Miss America pageant								
1947	Ruth Mary Blust	New Orleans				Vocal, "This Song Is You"			
1946	Marguerite McClelland	Baton Rouge			Miss Baton Rouge	Classical Vocal, "Frühlingsstimmen"	3rd runner-up		Multiple Louisiana representatives Competed under local title at Miss America pageant
1946	Joyce Josephine Frink	New Orleans			Miss New Orleans				Multiple Louisiana representatives Competed under local title at Miss America pageant
1945	Helene Shively	New Orleans			Miss New Orleans				Competed under local title at Miss America pageant
1944	Wilhelmina Hoffman	New Orleans			Miss New Orleans				Competed under local title at Miss America pageant
1943	Shirley Catherine Lange	New Orleans			Miss New Orleans				Competed under local title at Miss America pageant
1942	Edna Joyce	New Orleans			Miss New Orleans				Competed under local title at Miss America pageant
1941	Helen Yvonne Englert	New Orleans			Miss New Orleans				Competed under local title at Miss America pageant
1940	Pauline Powell	New Orleans			Miss New Orleans				Competed under local title at Miss America pageant
1939	Frances Helen Anello	New Orleans			Miss New Orleans				Competed under local title at Miss America pageant
1938	Irene Blush Schomberger	New Orleans			Miss New Orleans	Vocal / Trumpet / Dance			Competed under local title at Miss America pageant
1937	Gertrude Rissie Miller	Winnsboro					Top 16		
1936	Doris Huet	New Orleans			Miss New Orleans				Competed under local title at Miss America pageant
1935	No Louisiana representative at Miss America pageant								
1934	No national pageant was held								
1933	Marjorie Hagler			17			Top 18		
1932	No national pageants were held								
1931	No national pageants were held								
1930	No national pageants were held								
1929	No national pageants were held								
1928	No national pageants were held								
1927	Gladys Renya Moore	New Orleans			Miss New Orleans				Competed under local title at Miss America pageant
1926	Edna du Vernay	New Orleans			Miss New Orleans				Competed under local title at Miss America pageant
1925	Thelma Roeling	New Orleans			Miss New Orleans				Competed under local title at Miss America pageant
1924	Louise Moore	New Orleans			Miss New Orleans		Top 15		Competed under local title at Miss America pageant
1923	No Louisiana representative at Miss America pageant								
1922	Maude Allison Price	New Orleans			Miss New Orleans				Competed under local title at Miss America pageant
1921	No Louisiana representative at Miss America pageant								
