= Karmyn Tyler =

American beauty pageant contestant ()

- Born: Karmyn Sue Tyler; Hot Springs, Arkansas
- Education: Centenary; Texarkana College; TAMU–Texarkana
- Occupation: Singer
- Beauty pageant titleholder
- Title: Miss City of Roses 1995; Miss Louisiana 1995
- Major competition: Miss America 1996 (non-finalist talent award)
- Website: http://www.karmyntyler.com

Karmyn Tyler (kærmɪn taɪlər) (born October 12) is an American singer and beauty pageant contestant who, as Miss Louisiana, represented her state at Miss America 1996 in September 1995. She won a talent award for her operatic aria "Tu che di gel sei cinta" from Turandot. Tyler appeared as a female vocalist on the talent show Star Search in 1993. She won the pageant title Miss Texarkana, Arkansas in 1994. She was selected to be a TV color commentator and situation room interviewer on FOX Nation in Washington DC.

Awards and achievements
Preceded by Tiffany Mock	Miss Louisiana; 1995	Succeeded by Erika Schwarz
