= Thomas Duggan (disambiguation) =

Thomas, Tommy or Tom Duggan may refer to:

- Thomas Duggan (1882–1930) — a Canadian sports promoter
- Thomas Hinds Duggan (1815–1865) — Texas state senator
- Tommy Duggan (1897–1961) — American soccer player
- Tommy Duggan (1919–1998) — Irish film and television actor
- Tom Duggan (1915–1969) — American radio commentator

== See also ==
- Tom Dugan (disambiguation)
