= Arthur Watts =

Arthur Watts may refer to:

== People ==
- Arthur Watts (illustrator) (1883–1935), British illustrator and artist
- Arthur Watts (barrister) (1931–2007), British lawyer
- Arthur Watts (politician) (1897–1970), Australian politician
- Arthur Watts (swimmer) (1911–1962), English Olympic swimmer
- Arthur Thomas Watts (1837–1921), Texan politician

== Fictional characters ==
- Dr. Arthur Watts (RWBY), an antagonist of the animated web series RWBY

== See also ==
- Arthur Watt (1891–1973), Australian cricketer
- John Arthur Watts (1947–2016), British MP from Slough
- William Arthur Watts (1930–2010), professor in botany
