= Robert Bass (disambiguation) =

Robert Bass (born 1948) is an American businessman and philanthropist.

Robert Bass may also refer to:

- Robert Bass (American football) (born 1970), American football linebacker
- Robert Bass (conductor) (1953–2008), American music director and conductor
- Robert P. Bass (1873–1960), American farmer, forestry expert, and Republican politician from New Hampshire
- Robert Wilton Bass (1921–1998), politician from Texas
- Bob Bass (1929–2018), American basketball coach and executive
- Robert William Bass (1804–1875), English artist
