= McCoppin =

McCoppin is a surname. Notable people with the surname include:

- Frank McCoppin (1834–1897), American politician
- George Washington McCoppin (1904–1993), American politician
- Peter McCoppin (born 1948), Canadian conductor and organist
- Suzy McCoppin (born 1978), American actress and columnist
