= Hamp Atkinson =

American politician

Member of the Texas House of Representatives from the 1st district
- In office January 14, 1975 – January 11, 1983
- Preceded by: Vernon Edgar Howard
- Succeeded by: Alex Harris Short Jr.

Personal details
- Born: December 23, 1933 New Boston, Texas, US
- Died: July 5, 2016 (aged 82) De Kalb, Texas, US
- Spouse: Sue Farris Atkinson
- Children: 2
- Parent(s): Ballard Atkinson; Sybil Garrett Atkinson

Hamp Atkinson was a Texas Democratic politician who served in the Texas House of Representatives from 1975 to 1983.

== Life ==
Atkinson was born on December 23, 1933, in New Boston, Texas, to Ballard and Sybil Garrett Atkinson. He died on July 5, 2016, at the age of 82 in De Kalb, Texas.

== Politics ==
Hamp Atkinson was a democrat. He served in the Texas House from 1975 to 1983. He retired after his fourth term in office.
