= George Lavender =

American politician

Member of the Texas House of Representatives from the 1st district
- In office January 11, 2011 – January 13, 2015
- Preceded by: Stephen James Frost
- Succeeded by: Gary VanDeaver

Personal details
- Born: September 7, 1955 (age 71)
- Party: Republican
- Spouse: Jan Timberlake Lavender (married c. 1978)
- Education: Arkansas High School; University of Arkansas
- Occupation: Businessman

George Edward Lavender (born September 7, 1955) is an American state politician and a Republican former member of the Texas House of Representatives, having been first elected on November 2, 2010 and voted out of office in 2014 after only two terms. He has run for office seven times, including once as a Democrat, and has won twice.

He graduated in 1973 from Arkansas High School in Miller County, Arkansas. He holds an undergraduate degree in management from the University of Arkansas at Fayetteville. Born and raised in Arkansas, Lavender is now a businessman in Texarkana in Bowie County, Texas, where he resides with his wife.

Lavender was defeated, 45–55 percent in the 2008 general election by the Democratic incumbent Representative Stephen James Frost of New Boston, also in Bowie County. However, in 2010, with a narrow 51.5 percent of the vote, Lavender unseated Frost. Earlier, in both 1994 and 1996, Lavender ran unsuccessfully for the District 1 seat in the Texas State Senate, first as a Democrat, then as a Republican. He attempted to retake his seat in 2016, but lost by 24 points to Rep. Gary VanDeaver. In 2022, it will be his seventh campaign for public office.

In the 2011 House session, Lavender served on the Transportation and the Land and Resource Management committees. He worked for passage of legislation signed by Governor Rick Perry, which permits the manufacture of incandescent light bulbs in Texas. Lavender contends that fluorescent light bulbs contain mercury and are manufactured mostly in China. Lavender said consumers should have the choice of light bulbs and jobs in the industry should be kept in the United States.

In the 2012 general election Lavender faced no Democratic opponent. To secure his second term, he received 42,049 votes (82.6 percent) to the Libertarian Tim Eason's 8,830 ballots (17.4 percent). In his two terms, Lavender filed 43 bills, of which only 4 became law.

In the Republican primary election held on March 4, 2014, Lavender was unseated in his bid for a third legislative term by Gary VanDeaver, the former school superintendent of the New Boston Independent School District in New Boston, Texas, who received 9,400 votes (54.3 percent) to Lavender's 7,898 (45.7 percent).

On March 1, 2016, VanDeaver defeated Lavender in a rematch in the Republican primary. VanDeaver polled 18,263 votes (61.9 percent) to Lavender's 11,242 (38.1 percent).

Lavender ran against VanDeaver again in 2022, this time with a third candidate (Ray Null) in the Republican primary. His campaign finance forms filed with the Texas Ethics Commission indicate it is a self-funded campaign with a personal loan of $50,000. Once again, Lavender lost to VanDeaver, and even with a third candidate in the mix VanDeaver increased his winning percentage over Lavender.

Texas House of Representatives
Preceded by Stephen James Frost	Texas State Representative for District 1 January 11, 2011 – January 13, 2015	Succeeded by Gary VanDeaver
