= Texas A&M University–Texarkana =

Public university in Texarkana, Texas, U.S.

Coordinates: 33.4911°N 94.0967°W

- Former names: East Texas State University Center at Texarkana (1971–1996)
- Type: Public university
- Established: 1971
- President: Ross Alexander
- Provost: Melinda Arnold
- Academic staff: 132
- Students: 2,112 (fall 2022)
- Location: Texarkana, Texas, US
- Campus: Urban, 375 acres (152 ha)
- Colors: Maroon, navy and gold
- Nickname: Eagles
- Sporting affiliations: NAIA – RRAC
- Website: www.tamut.edu

Texas A&M University–Texarkana (A&M–Texarkana or TAMUT) is a public university in Texarkana, Texas, United States. It is part of the Texas A&M University System.

Students who reside in Oklahoma and Arkansas attend at in-state tuition rates, and historically 30 percent of the student body is from Arkansas. Louisiana residents who reside in a parish that borders Texas may also attend at in-state tuition rates.

== History ==
A&M–Texarkana first opened with 323 students in 1971 as East Texas State University Center at Texarkana, an upper-level branch of the main East Texas State University (ETSU) in Commerce, Texas. It originally shared a campus with local community college Texarkana College and "was established to provide third and fourth-year college instruction for people residing in an isolated region." The university received separate accreditation in 1980, and when ETSU joined the Texas A&M System as Texas A&M University–Commerce (now East Texas A&M University) in September 1996, the Texarkana branch became a separate institution and was renamed to Texas A&M University–Texarkana.

The university became a four-year college with graduate programs in 2010, moving to its new and current campus near Bringle Lake Park.

In the late 2010s, the university received large funding grants from the state legislature, including $32 million worth of building construction in 2016, supported by State Representative Gary VanDeaver and Speaker of the Texas House Joe Straus, and a 2019 $3.6 million funding addition for new academic programs, including support from VanDeaver and State Senator Bryan Hughes.

As a response to the COVID-19 pandemic in the United States, the university transitioned to online classes for the spring 2020 semester and donated test kits to local hospitals.

== Academics ==
A&M–Texarkana is a member of the Texas A&M University System and is governed by its Board of Regents. The university's current president is Ross Alexander and provost Melinda Arnold is the academic head.

A&M–Texarkana is organized into two academic colleges which both offer undergraduate and graduate programs, the College of Arts, Sciences and Education and the College of Business, Engineering, and Technology. Combined, the colleges provide 18 undergraduate majors, 20 master's degree programs, and several Extended Education and Community Development programs (for certifications without a degree).

In 2013, A&M–Texarkana and Northeast Texas Community College signed a matriculation agreement between their bachelor and associate nursing programs, respectively, followed by a dual admissions agreement between A&M-Texarkana and Texarkana College in 2014, and one between A&M–Texarkana and Paris Junior College in 2015. The College of Arts, Sciences and Education is partnered with all three of the above as well as Collin College.

In 2015, local ophthalmic group Texarkana Eye Associates partnered with the university to offer an ophthalmic assistant/optician training course, which was then offered beginning in 2016 as a professional (not for credit) course.

In 2019 the History Department launched the Red River Center for Regional History and Culture to support the collection, preservation, exchange, and dissemination of locally and regionally significant materials relating to history and culture in the Red River area, including southeastern Oklahoma, northeast Texas, southwest Arkansas, and northwest Louisiana.

In 2020, A&M–Texarkana announced that it would launch a Bachelor of Science in Mechanical Engineering 2020 beginning fall 2020.

== Campus ==
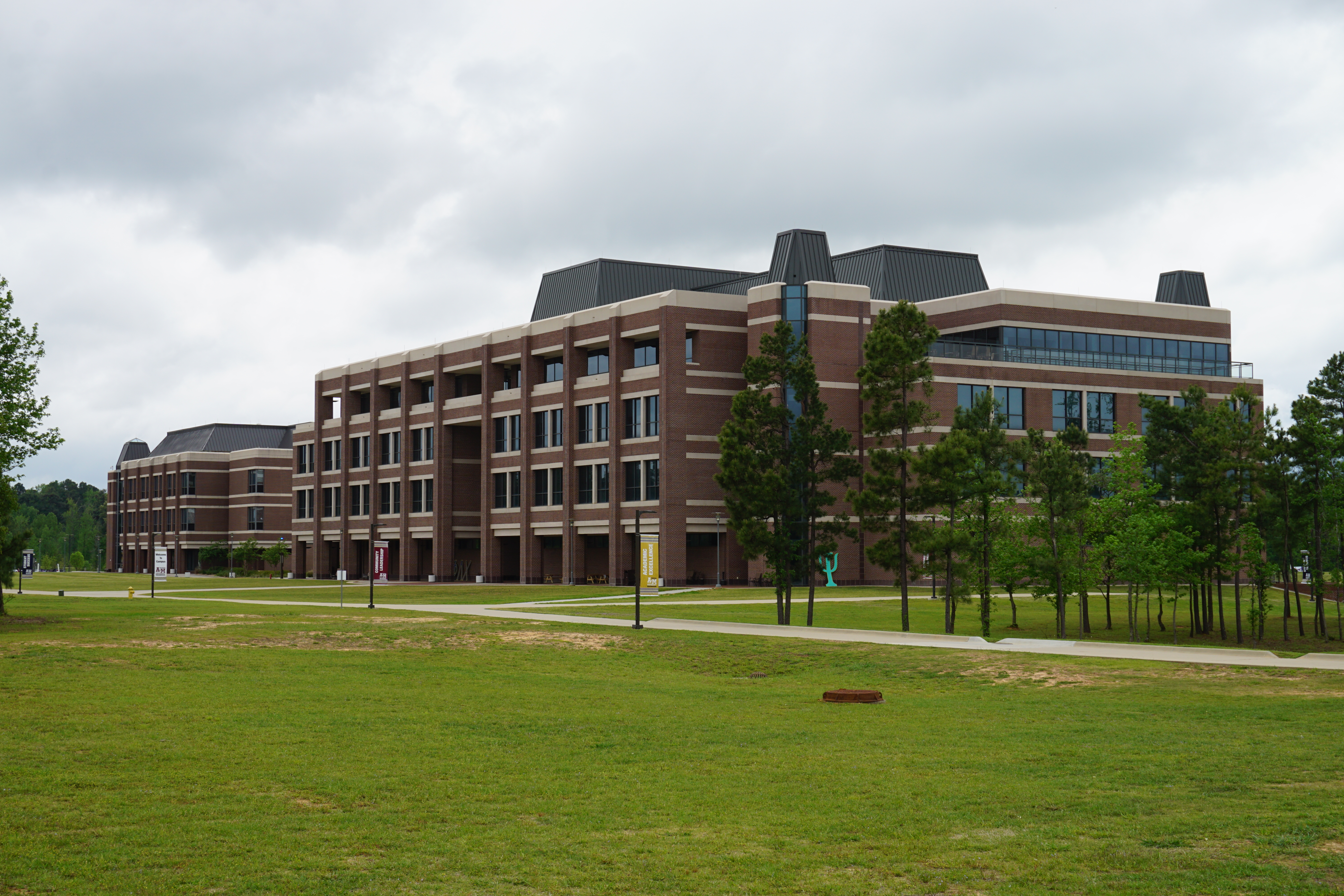
The University Center and the Science & Technology Building at A&M–Texarkana

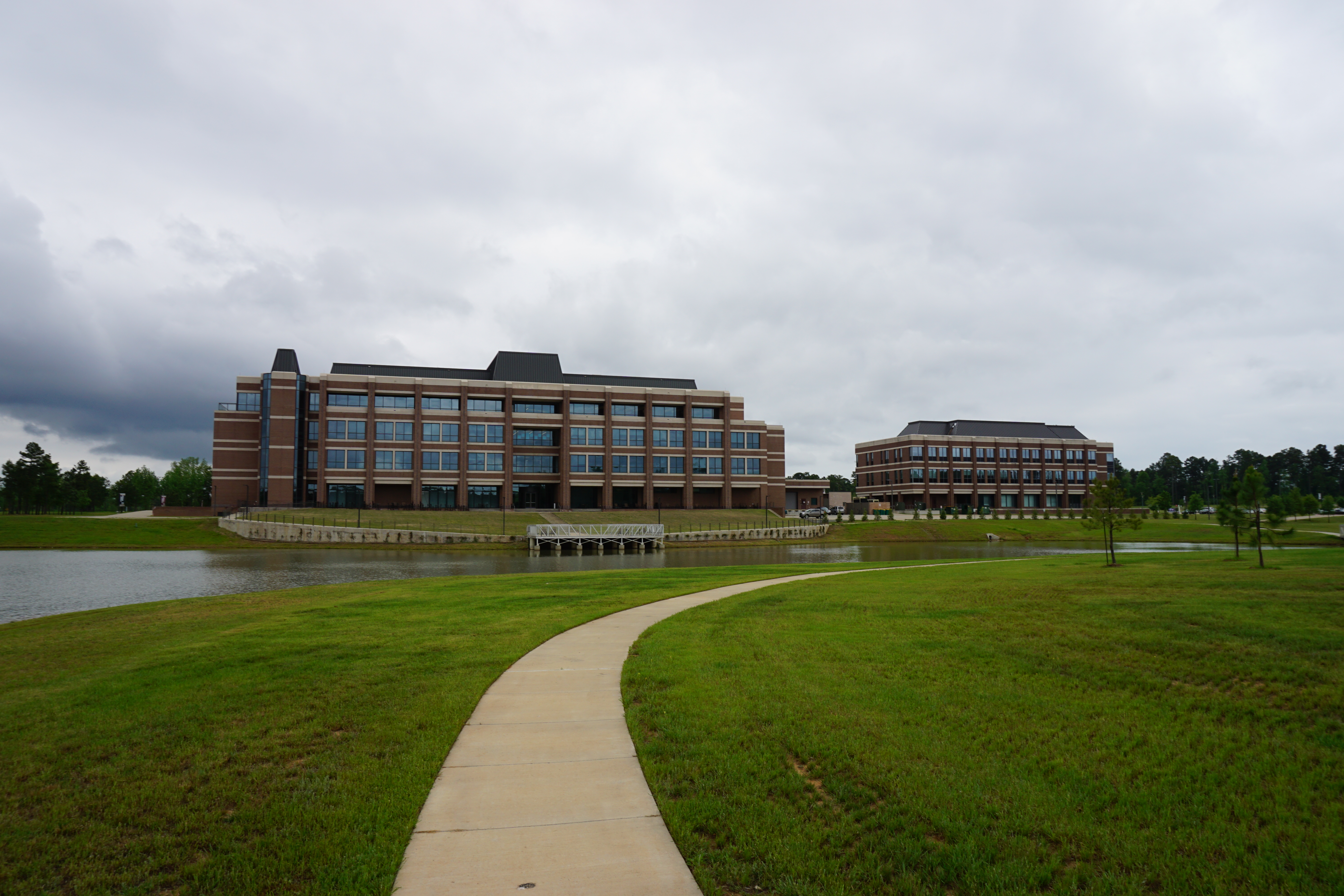
The A&M–Texarkana campus

The Texarkana metropolitan area is located one hour (72 miles) from Shreveport, Louisiana, two hours (145 miles) from Little Rock, Arkansas, and less than three hours (180 miles) from Dallas, Texas.

Until 2010, the university shared the same campus with Texarkana College. On this campus, buildings included the construction of the A. M. and Welma Aikin Learning Center in 1978, a library in 1983, and a Center for Professional Development in 1985.

In 2004, the university acquired 375 acres of land as a gift from the City of Texarkana, Texas (300 acres), and the Anita and Truman Arnold Foundation (75 acres). The university received funding from the Texas Legislature for the construction of buildings at the new campus near Bringle Lake in Texarkana, Texas.

Construction of the new campus began in 2006. Six buildings have been built: Science & Technology, University Center, Central Plant, Bringle Lake Village, the Student Recreation Center, and the Building for Academic and Student Services, completed in 2019. Bringle Lake Village is a 294-bed furnished residence hall that features many amenities, including an in-ground swimming pool, sand volleyball court, and fitness center. Students have three-floor plans from which to choose.

Its library is named after founding president John F. Moss.

== Athletics ==
The Texas A&M–Texarkana (TAMUT) athletic teams are called the Eagles. The university is a member of the National Association of Intercollegiate Athletics (NAIA), primarily competing in the Red River Athletic Conference (RRAC) since the 2016–17 academic year. The Eagles previously competed as an NAIA independent within the Association of Independent Institutions (AII) from 2014–15 (the same season when it began its athletics program and joined the NAIA) to 2015–16.

TAMUT competes in 21 intercollegiate varsity sports: Men's sports include baseball, basketball, bowling, cross country, golf, soccer, tennis and track & field; while women's sports include basketball, beach volleyball, bowling, cross country, golf, soccer, softball, tennis, track & field and volleyball; and co-ed sports compete in cheer, dance and Esports.

=== History ===
The university added the intercollegiate athletics program in 2014 with women's soccer and men's & women's tennis. Texas A&M–Texarkana continued to expand the offerings with baseball in 2015, and men's soccer in 2016. It also announced the addition of softball in 2017. The university announced the addition of men's and women's basketball for the 2019–20 academic year, bringing the total number of intercollegiate sports to eight.

In 2025, the university announced that it would be adding football and play will begin with the 2027 season. Coinciding with the announcement, athletic director Ryan Wall announced that the Eagles will be moving to the Lone Star Conference at the NCAA Division II level starting with the 2026–27 academic year. The athletics department also entered a partnership with Red River Credit Union for the naming rights to the future football stadium; the stadium is planned to have a capacity of 6,000 and open in 2028.

=== Accomplishments ===
Both the men's baseball and women's soccer teams have made appearances in post-season tournaments. In addition, nearly all of the sports teams have appeared in RRAC conference tournaments, and the men's tennis team has appeared in the NAIA national tournament.

== Student life ==
Undergraduate demographics as of Fall 2023
Race and ethnicity	Total
White	49%
Hispanic	19%
Black	18%
International student	6%
Two or more races	5%
Asian	1%
Unknown	1%
Economic diversity
Low-income (Note: The percentage of students who received an income-based federal Pell grant intended for low-income students.)	51%
Affluent (Note: The percentage of students who are a part of the American middle class at the bare minimum.)	49%

There are over 30 recognized student organizations at A&M–Texarkana.

=== National honorary societies ===
- Beta Beta Beta (Biology)
- Chi Sigma Iota (Counseling)
- Beta Gamma Sigma (Business)
- Kappa Delta Pi (Education)
- Phi Alpha Theta (History)
- Psi Chi (Psychology)
- Sigma Tau Delta (English)
- Alpha Chi (Honors)

=== Fraternities and sororities ===
- Omega Delta Chi sorority
- Zeta Phi Beta sorority
- Alpha Sigma Alpha sorority
- Phi Lambda Chi fraternity

== Notable people ==
=== Alumni ===
- Stephen J. Frost, BS-History, Democratic member of the Texas House of Representatives from Maud
- Martha Whitehead, MBA, former mayor of Longview, Texas and Texas State Treasurer
- Erwin Cain, BS, Republican member of the Texas House of Representatives from Sulphur Springs
- Bob Bruggeman, BBA, Mayor of Texarkana

=== Faculty ===
- Benjamin Neuman, biologist and coronavirus expert
- Parag K. Lala, electrical engineer and textbook author
