= Tom Dugan =

Thomas or Tom Dugan may refer to:

- Thomas Buchanan Dugan (1858–1940), United States Army brigadier general
- Tom Dugan (actor, born 1889) (1889–1955), Irish-born American film and television actor
- Tom Dugan (actor, born 1961), American theater, film and television actor

== See also ==
- Thomas Duggan (disambiguation)
