= Barry B. Telford =

American politician

Member of the Texas House of Representatives from the 1st district
- In office January 13, 1987 – January 11, 2005
- Preceded by: Alex Harris Short Jr.
- Succeeded by: Stephen James Frost

Bowie County Democratic Chair
- In office 1980–1986

Personal details
- Born: October 24, 1946 (age 79) New Boston, Texas, USA
- Died: June 1, 2024 (aged 77)
- Spouse: Marsha
- Children: 2

Barry B. Telford (October 24, 1946 – June 1, 2024) was an American politician who served in the Texas House of Representatives from 1987 to 2005. He was the Bowie County Democratic Chair from 1980 to 1986.

== Life ==
Telford was born on October 24, 1946, in New Boston, Texas. He attended Texarkana Junior College and graduated from North Texas State University in 1970 with a Bachelor of Science degree in education.

Telford died on June 1, 2024 at the age of 77.

== House of Representatives election results (1986-2002) ==
Election	Candidates	Party	Votes	Percent
1988 General Election	Barry B. Telford	Democratic Party	[data missing]	100%
1990 General Election	Barry B. Telford	Democratic Party	[data missing]	100%
1992 Primary Election	Barry B. Telford	Democratic Party	15,893 of 15,893	100%
1992 General Election	Barry B. Telford	Democratic Party	30,216 of 30,216	100%
1994 Primary Election	Barry B. Telford	Democratic Party	[data missing]	100%
1994 General Election	Barry B. Telford	Democratic Party	[data missing]	100%
1996 Primary Election	Barry B. Telford	Democratic Party	[data missing]	100%
1996 General Election	Barry B. Telford	Democratic Party	24,728 of 38,778	63.77%
1998 Primary Election	Barry B. Telford	Democratic Party	[data missing]	100%
1998 General Election	Barry B. Telford	Democratic Party	18,237 of 18,237	100%
2000 General Election	Barry B. Telford	Democratic Party	29,989 of 29,989	100%
2002	Barry B. Telford	Democratic Party	20,627 of 33,242	62.05%
2002	Dan Teafatiller	Republican Party	12,615 of 33,242	37.95%
