= Joseph Grigsby Smyth =

American politician

Member of the Texas House of Representatives from the 1st district
- In office February 8, 1870 – January 14, 1873
- Preceded by: Ambrose Dudley Kent
- Succeeded by: James H. Armstrong; Henry Harrison Ford; Arthur Thomas Watts

Personal details
- Born: February 25, 1847 Texas, US
- Died: June 8, 1915 (aged 68) Texas, US
- Spouse(s): Ella E. Green; Epsie Belle Miller
- Children: 13

Joseph Grigsby Smyth (February 25, 1847 – June 8, 1915) was a Texan politician who served in the Texas House from 1870 to 1873.

== Life ==
=== Early years (1847-1870) ===
Smyth was born on February 25, 1847. He married Ella E. Green on March 2, 1868. They had five children together, but only two made it past age 9. Ella died on September 13, 1883.

=== Texas House (1870-1873) ===
He was elected to the Texas House in February 1870 at the age of 22.

=== Later years (1873-1915) ===
He married Epsie Belle Miller on June 5, 1884. They had eight children together between September 1885 and February 1901. One of them died before turning 2. Joseph died June 8, 1915, at the age of 68.
