= Miss Louisiana's Teen =

Beauty pageant competition

- Formation: 1993
- Type: Beauty pageant
- Location: Monroe, Louisiana
- Members: Miss America's Teen
- Official language: English
- Key people: Dewana Little
- Website: Official website

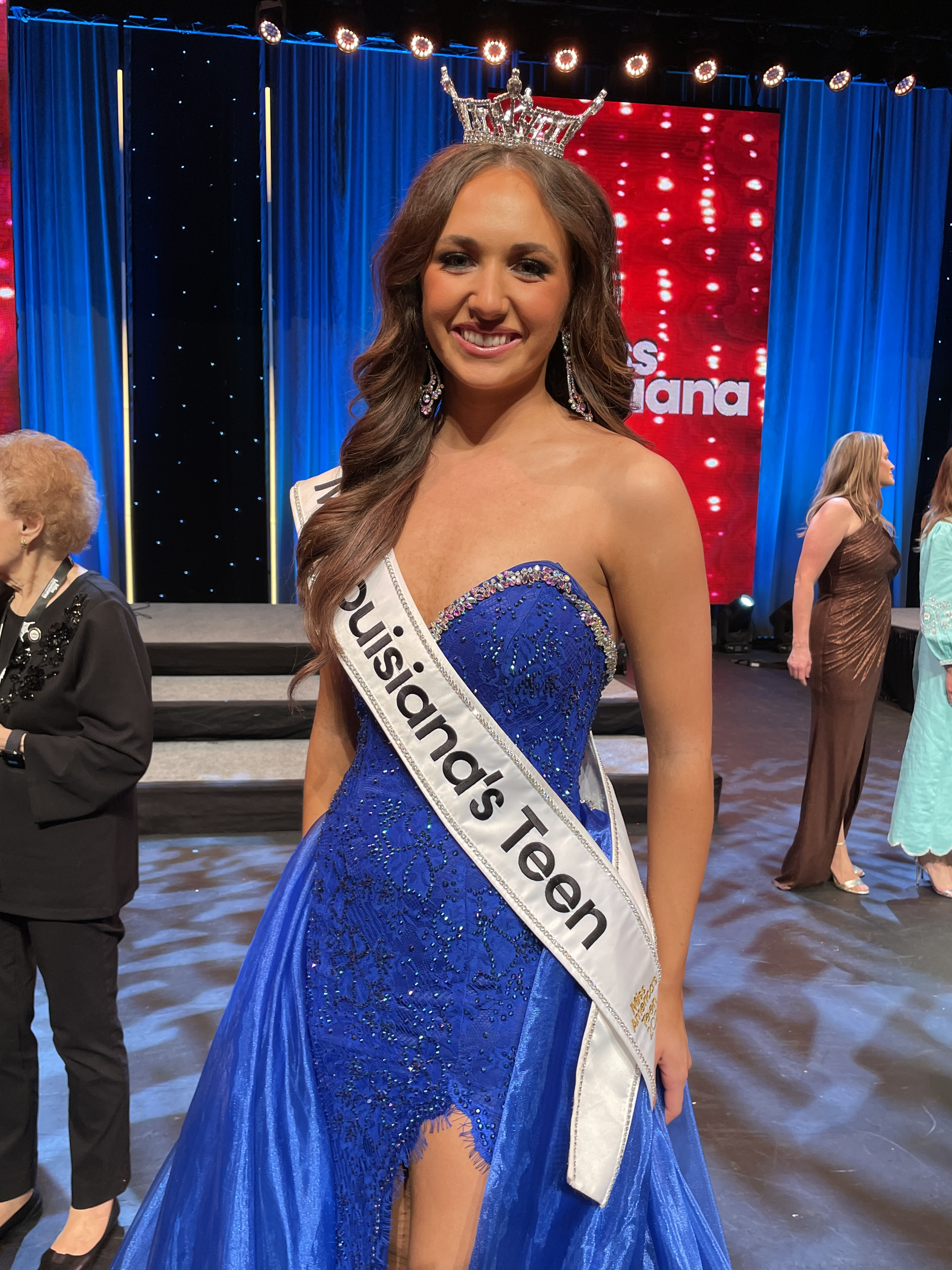
Ava Martin, Miss Louisiana Teen 2026

The Miss Louisiana's Teen competition is the pageant that selects the representative for the U.S. state of Louisiana in the Miss America's Teen pageant. The pageant is held each April at the Brown Auditorium at the University of Louisiana at Monroe in Monroe, Louisiana.

Ava Martin of Minden was crowned Miss Louisiana's Teen on April 12, 2026, at the ULM Brown Auditorium in Monroe, Louisiana. She competed for the title of Miss America's Teen 2027 on September 5, 2026, at the Kravis Center for the Performing Arts in West Palm Beach, Florida.

In January 2023, the official name of the pageant was changed from Miss Louisiana's Outstanding Teen to Miss Louisiana's Teen in accordance with the national pageant.

== Results summary ==
The following is a visual summary of the past results of Miss Louisiana's Teen titleholders presented in the table below. The year in parentheses indicates year of the Miss America's Teen competition in which the placement and/or award was garnered.

=== Placements ===
- 3rd runners-up: Mary Jane Hobgood (2008)
- 4th runners-up: Sarah Katherine McCallum (2017)
- Top 10: Kelly Bernard (2010)
- Top 11: Melissa Le (2025)
- Top 15: Justine Ker (2012), Chanley Patterson (2020)

=== Awards ===
==== Preliminary awards ====
- Preliminary Talent: Mary Jane Hobgood (2008), Melissa Le (2025)

==== Other awards ====
- Miss Congeniality/Spirit of America: Jeremeka Bradley (2007)
- Children's Miracle Network (CMN) Miracle Maker Award: Julia Claire Williams (2016)
- Overall Instrumental Talent Award: Justine Ker (2012), Chanley Patterson (2020)
- Overall Interview Award: Jeremeka Bradley (2007)
- Scholastic Excellence Award: Justine Ker (2012)
- Top 5 Interview Award: Sarah Katherine McCallum (2017)
- AHA Go Red for Women Leadership Award: Virginia Kirkpatrick (2026)

== Winners ==
- Declared as winner
- Ended as a runner-up
- Ended as a finalist or semi-finalist

Year	Name	Hometown	Age	Local title	Talent	Placement at MAO Teen	Special scholarships at MAO Teen	Notes
2026	Ava Martin	Minden	18	Miss Union Parish's Teen	Musical Theater Dance			Previously Miss Louisiana Teen Volunteer 2024; Top 10 at Miss Teen Volunteer America 2025
2025	Virginia Kirkpatrick	Baton Rouge	16	Miss Louisiana Port City’s Teen	Jazz Dance, “If My Friends Could See Me Now”		AHA Go Red for Women Leadership Award	Younger sister of Miss Louisiana's Teen 2023, Laura Jane Kirkpatrick; Daughter of Miss Louisiana 1998, Heather Dupree; Granddaughter of Miss Mississippi 1969, Jane Carol Foshee
2024	Melissa Le	Ruston	16	Miss Louisiana Watermelon Festival's Teen	Classical Piano, “Hungarian, Opus 39, No. 12”	Top 11	Preliminary Talent Award	Later Distinguished Young Woman of Louisiana 2026; Top 8 at America’s Distinguished Young Woman 2026 competition; Previously Miss Louisiana Teen Volunteer 2022; 4th Runner up at Miss Teen Volunteer America 2023
2023	Laura Jane Kirkpatrick	Baton Rouge	17	Miss Dixie Stockshow's Teen	Lyrical Dance, “I dreamed A Dream”			Daughter of Miss Louisiana 1998, Heather Dupree; Older sister of Miss Louisiana's Teen 2025, Virginia Kirkpatrick; Granddaughter of Miss Mississippi 1969, Jane Carol Foshee
2022	Mary Laura Hunt	Ruston	16	Miss Louisiana Watermelon Festival's Outstanding Teen	Lyrical Dance			
2021	Sophia Nawaz	New Orleans	17	Miss Vieux Carré's Outstanding Teen	Pop Vocal, "C'est si Bon"			
2019-20	Chanley Patterson	Ruston	16	Miss Louisiana Watermelon Festival's Outstanding Teen	Piano, "El Cumbanchero"	Top 15	Overall Instrumental Talent Award	3rd Runner-Up at the Miss Louisiana 2025 pageant
2018	Gracie Reichman	Colfax	17	Miss Louisiana Watermelon Festival's Outstanding Teen	Contemporary Clogging, "Let's Get Loud"			Later Miss Louisiana 2022
2017	Alana Lewis	Haughton	17	Miss Louisiana Watermelon Festival's Outstanding Teen	Vocal, "The Girl in 14G”			
2016	Sarah Katherine McCallum	Farmerville	15	Miss Louisiana Watermelon Festival's Outstanding Teen	Vocal, "Climb Ev'ry Mountain" from The Sound of Music	4th runner-up	Top 5 Interview Award	Later Distinguished Young Woman of Louisiana 2019; Top 8 at Distinguished Young Woman of America 2019 competition
2015	Julia Claire Williams	Kinder	16	Miss Holiday in Dixie's Outstanding Teen	Lyrical Dance		CMN Miracle Maker Award	Later Miss Louisiana 2021
2014	Meagan Crews	Bossier City	17	Miss Dixie Gem Peach's Outstanding Teen	Vocal			Later Miss Louisiana 2019
2013	BayLea Huffman	Delhi	16	Miss Louisiana Port City's Outstanding Teen	Dance			
2012	Deon Sumer	Zachary	17	Miss Acadiana's Outstanding Teen	Baton Twirling			
2011	Justine Ker	Choudrant	17	Miss Spirit of Ruston's Outstanding Teen	Classical Piano	Top 15	Outstanding Instrumental Talent Award Scholastic Excellence Award	Later Miss Louisiana 2016; Top 15 at the Miss America 2017 pageant
2010	Brooke Hotard	Port Allen	16	Miss Crescent City's Outstanding Teen	Jazz Dance			
2009	Kelly Bernard	Hammond	16	Miss Monroe's Outstanding Teen	Vocal	Top 10		2nd runner-up at Miss Louisiana 2014 pageant Top 10 at the National Sweetheart 2014 pageant
2008	April Nelson	Mandeville	16	Miss Pineville's Outstanding Teen	Vocal			Later Miss Louisiana 2015; 3rd runner-up at Miss America 2016 pageant
2007	Mary Jane Hobgood	Shreveport		Miss Holiday in Dixie's Outstanding Teen	Ballet en Pointe, Rodeo by Aaron Copland	3rd runner-up	Preliminary Talent Award	
2006	Jeremeka Bradley	Bossier City	16	Miss Bossier City's Outstanding Teen	Vocal		Overall Interview Award Spirit of America Award	
2005	Bethany Moore	Bastrop	18	Miss Louisiana Harvest Festival's Outstanding Teen	Vocal			
2004	Whitney Breaux	Baton Rouge		Greater Baton Rouge Teen	Harp	No national pageant Was previously an independent pageant with the winner earning the title of, "Miss Teen Louisiana" Changed to current title after a national pageant was created by the Miss America Organization in 2005		
2003	Bethany Hejtmanek	Shreveport		Holiday in Dixie Teen	Vocal	No national pageant Was previously an independent pageant with the winner earning the title of, "Miss Teen Louisiana" Changed to current title after a national pageant was created by the Miss America Organization in 2005		
2002	Blair Abene	Tickfaw		Ark-La-Miss Fair Teen	Vocal	No national pageant Was previously an independent pageant with the winner earning the title of, "Miss Teen Louisiana" Changed to current title after a national pageant was created by the Miss America Organization in 2005		Later Miss Louisiana 2008
2001	Courtney Haynes	West Monroe	16	Bossier City Teen	Vocal, "Stormy Weather"	No national pageant Was previously an independent pageant with the winner earning the title of, "Miss Teen Louisiana" Changed to current title after a national pageant was created by the Miss America Organization in 2005		Appeared on Star Search at age 6 3rd runner-up at Miss Louisiana 2009 pageant
2000	Amie Bonomolo			Acadiana Teen	Lyrical Dance	No national pageant Was previously an independent pageant with the winner earning the title of, "Miss Teen Louisiana" Changed to current title after a national pageant was created by the Miss America Organization in 2005		3rd runner-up at Miss Louisiana 2002 pageant
1999	Molly Causey	Ruston		Shreveport Teen	Piano	No national pageant Was previously an independent pageant with the winner earning the title of, "Miss Teen Louisiana" Changed to current title after a national pageant was created by the Miss America Organization in 2005		Later Miss Louisiana 2005
1998	Melissa Clark	Ruston		Dixie Gem Peach Teen	Vocal	No national pageant Was previously an independent pageant with the winner earning the title of, "Miss Teen Louisiana" Changed to current title after a national pageant was created by the Miss America Organization in 2005		Later Miss Louisiana 2003
1997	Shantel Beauclair-Smith			Central Louisiana Teen		No national pageant Was previously an independent pageant with the winner earning the title of, "Miss Teen Louisiana" Changed to current title after a national pageant was created by the Miss America Organization in 2005		
1996	Kati Guyton	Bossier City		Holiday in Dixie Teen	Classical Vocal	No national pageant Was previously an independent pageant with the winner earning the title of, "Miss Teen Louisiana" Changed to current title after a national pageant was created by the Miss America Organization in 2005		Later Miss Louisiana 2001
1995	Casey Jo Crowder	Shreveport		River Cities Teen	Vocal	No national pageant Was previously an independent pageant with the winner earning the title of, "Miss Teen Louisiana" Changed to current title after a national pageant was created by the Miss America Organization in 2005		Later Miss Louisiana 2002
1994	Nicole Barrett			Independence Bowl Teen		No national pageant Was previously an independent pageant with the winner earning the title of, "Miss Teen Louisiana" Changed to current title after a national pageant was created by the Miss America Organization in 2005		
1993	Lyn Smith			Caddo Lake Teen		No national pageant Was previously an independent pageant with the winner earning the title of, "Miss Teen Louisiana" Changed to current title after a national pageant was created by the Miss America Organization in 2005		
