= James Armstrong (Texas politician) =

American politician

Member of the Texas House of Representatives from the Jefferson district
- In office December 13, 1847 – November 5, 1849
- Preceded by: [data missing]
- Succeeded by: District created

Member of the Texas Senate from the 14th district
- In office November 3, 1851 – November 7, 1853
- Preceded by: Jerome B. Robertson
- Succeeded by: James K. Holland

Member of the Texas Senate from the 23rd district
- In office November 7, 1853 – November 2, 1857 Serving with Thomas Hinds Duggan
- Preceded by: [data missing]
- Succeeded by: George Bernard Erath

Member of the Texas House of Representatives from the 1st district
- In office January 14, 1873 – January 13, 1874
- Preceded by: Thomas Jefferson Chambers; Joseph Grigsby Smyth; W. T. Simmons
- Succeeded by: James Bates Simpson; Dan Triplett; Pinkney Samuel Watts

Personal details
- Born: c. 1811 Kentucky, U.S.
- Died: December 21, 1879 (aged 67–68) Beaumont, Texas, U.S.
- Children: 5

James Armstrong (c. 1811 - December 21, 1879) was a Texan politician who served in the Texas House and Texas Senate.

== Life ==
=== Early years ===
Armstrong was born in 1811 in Kentucky. He later moved to Jasper County in 1835, where he would stay until 1840.

=== Politics ===
He served in many districts in both the Texas House and Texas Senate from 1847 to 1874.

=== Later years ===
He died of pneumonia on December 21, 1879, at Beaumont, Jefferson County, Texas, at the age of 67–68.
