= Alex Harris Short Jr. =

American politician

Alex Harris Short, Jr.

Member of the Texas House of Representatives from the 1st district
- In office January 11, 1983 – January 13, 1987
- Preceded by: Hamp Atkinson
- Succeeded by: Barry B. Telford

Personal details
- Born: January 5, 1947 Bell County, Texas, US
- Died: March 10, 1996 (aged 49)
- Spouse: Rebecca Ruth Dees
- Children: 1
- Parent(s): Alex Short Sr. Bernice Marie Tucker

Alex Harris Short Jr. was a politician who served in the Texas House from 1983 to 1987.

== Life ==
Short Jr. was born on January 5, 1947, to Alex Short Sr. and Bernice Marie Tucker in Bell County, Texas, US. He has 1 sister, named Jan Short. He died on March 10, 1996, at the age of 49.

== Politics ==
Alex ran for the Texas House in the 1982 and 1984 election and won. He served from January 11, 1983, to January 13, 1987. He retired and served no more terms.
