= Vernon Edgar Howard =

Texan politician

Ed Howard
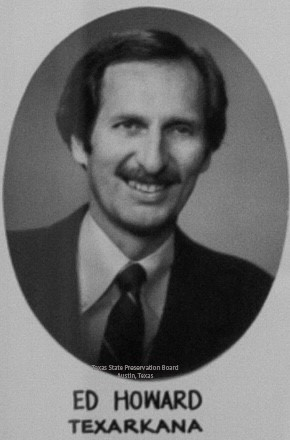

Member of the Texas House of Representatives from the 1st district
- In office January 14, 1969 – January 14, 1975
- Preceded by: Robert Wilton Bass
- Succeeded by: Hamp Atkinson

Member of the Texas Senate from the 1st district
- In office January 9, 1979 – September 18, 1986
- Preceded by: A. M. Aikin Jr.
- Succeeded by: Richard M. Anderson

Personal details
- Born: April 13, 1937 Hot Springs, Arkansas, USA
- Died: July 2, 1998 (aged 61)
- Party: Democratic
- Spouse: Jo Ann Jay
- Children: 4
- Parent(s): Verna Elisha Howard; Ruth Moryne Jackson

Vernon Edgar "Ed" Howard (April 13, 1937 – July 2, 1998) was a Texan politician who served in the Texas House of Representatives for District 1 from 1969 to 1975 and the Texas Senate for District 1 from 1979 to 1986. He served in both positions as a representative of the Democratic Party.

== Early years and education ==
Howard was born on April 13, 1937, in Hot Springs, Arkansas to Verna Elisha Howard and Ruth Moryne (nee Jackson) and moved to Texas at a very early age. He graduated from Greenville High School in 1955, where he was a basketball star and involved in student government. He later attended Abilene Christian College and graduated in 1959 with a bachelor's degree in Business Administration. He then continued his education at Southern Methodist University, where he received his master's degree in Political Science.

== Politics ==
Nicknamed "Honest Ed," Howard served in both the Texas House of Representatives and Texas Senate.

=== Texas House of Representatives ===
Howard served in the Texas House of Representatives from 1969 to 1975. While in office, he was selected "Who's Who in American Politics," "Who's Who in the South," and was instrumental in the passage of key legislation in education and city services that earned him the award "Outstanding Young Legislator."

=== Texas Senate ===
After serving three terms in the Texas House, he was elected to the Texas Senate in 1978, where he served from 1979 to 1986.

Howard's major areas of concern were wiretapping, insurance, industrial revenue bonds, and revisions in the method of financing our colleges and universities. Living in Texarkana, with three states bordering his district, Howard was also interested in strengthening interstate compacts between Texas and neighboring legislatures.

He served as Vice-Chairman and Chairman of the Sunset Advisory Commission. He served on the Interstate Oil Compact Commission and was twice selected a delegate to the Southern Regional Education Board.

In April 1985, he announced his resignation to become a lobbyist.

=== Committees ===
Committee Chart
		House			Senate
Year	R.S.	Committees	Year	R.S.	Committees
1969	61st	Claims Elections Governmental Affairs and Efficiency Oil, Gas and Mining State Contracting Procedures, Interim Youth	1979	66th	Administration (Vice Chair): Administration Subcommittee: Rules; Economic Development State Affairs: State Affairs Subcommittee: Nominations
1971	62nd	Administration Business and Marketing Affairs Counties Degree Plans Highways and Roads House Rules and Procedures School Districts Urban Affairs	1981	67th	Administration (Vice Chair): Administration Subcommittee: Rules; Fees and Grants, Interim Finance (Vice Chair) Regional Intergovernmental Cooperation, Special State Affairs: State Affairs Subcommittee: Nominations
1973	63rd	Environmental Affairs: Environmental Affairs Subcommittee: State Parks; Human Resources Revenue and Taxation: Revenue and Taxation Subcommittee: Exemptions	1983	68th	Committee of the Whole Senate: Committee of the Whole Senate Subcommittee: Finance; Economic Development Finance (Vice Chair) Regional Intergovernmental Cooperation, Special State Affairs: State Affairs Subcommittee: Nominations
			1985	69th	Administration, Special Committee of the Whole Senate Economic Development Finance (Vice Chair) Jurisprudence Natural Resources Nominations, Special (Chair) Premium Tax Task Force State Affairs

== Family and personal life ==
He married Jo Ann Jay in 1960. He became very successful in the business world with his wife. They had four children: Eric, Jay, Lee, and Katie.

An animal lover, Howard went hunting with a group of friends every year; however, his actual purpose was to fire off rounds but not hit the deer so as to make them wary during the hunting season; in ten years of such conservation-oriented hunting, he did not succeed in killing one animal and maintained a close bond of friendship with his hunting buddies who said that he "just can't hit the broadside of a barn."

== Death ==
He died on July 2, 1998, at the age of 61 of throat cancer. He was buried in the Texas State Cemetery at Austin, Travis County, Texas, USA. He is survived by his wife, children, and ten grandchildren.
