= Stephen James Frost =

American politician (born 1972)

Member of the Texas House of Representatives from the 1st district
- In office January 11, 2005 – January 11, 2011
- Preceded by: Barry B. Telford
- Succeeded by: George Lavender

Personal details
- Born: March 30, 1972 (age 54) Cass County, Texas, U.S.
- Party: Democratic
- Spouse: Kimberly Davis (m. 2002)

Stephen James Frost (born March 30, 1972) is an American politician who served in the Texas House of Representatives from 2005 to 2011.

== Life ==
Frost was born on March 30, 1972, to George and Monica Frost in Cass County, Texas. The Frost family moved to Maud, Texas in 1980. He graduated from Texas A&M - Texarkana with a B.S. in History. In 1997, Stephen went on to earn a J.D. degree from the University of Arkansas at Little Rock School of Law. In 2002, he married Kimberly Davis.

Frost was elected as the representative for the 1st district of the Texas House of Representatives in the 2004 election and started the term on January 11, 2005. He also won the 2006 and 2008 elections for this seat. He ran again in 2010, but lost to George Lavender in the general election.

== Election results ==
=== 2004 Election ===
03/09/2004 Democratic primary results
Party	Candidate	Votes	%
Democratic	Stephen James Frost	10,757	58.31
Democratic	Jerry "Lynn" Davis, Jr.	7,691	41.69
Total votes		18,448	100

11/02/2004 General Election results
Party	Candidate	Votes	%
Democratic	Stephen James Frost	28,495	52.81
Republican	H. E. "Pete" Snow	25,463	47.19
Total votes		53,958	100

=== 2006 Election ===
03/07/2006 Democratic Primary Election results
Party	Candidate	Votes	%
Democratic	Stephen James Frost	21,841	100
Total votes		21,841	100

11/07/2006 General Election results
Party	Candidate	Votes	%
Democratic	Stephen James Frost	21,841	86.79
Libertarian	Tim E. Eason	3,324	13.21
Total votes		53,958	100

=== 2008 Election ===
11/04/2008 General Election results
Party	Candidate	Votes	%
Democratic	Stephen James Frost	29,598	53.59
Republican	George Lavender	24,853	45.00
Libertarian	Tim E. Eason	781	1.41
Total votes		55,232	100

=== 2010 Election ===
11/02/2010 General Election results
Party	Candidate	Votes	%
Republican	George Lavender	18,575	51.51
Democratic	Stephen James Frost	14,717	40.82
Independent	Trent E. Gale	2,766	7.67
Total votes		55,232	100
