= Robert Wilton Bass =

American politician (1921–1998)

Member of the Texas House of Representatives from the 1st district
- In office January 10, 1961 – January 14, 1969
- Preceded by: George Washington McCoppin
- Succeeded by: Vernon Edgar Howard

Personal details
- Born: September 16, 1921
- Died: June 28, 1998 (aged 76)
- Spouse: Joann Sheppard (1924-?)
- Children: 2
- Parent(s): Allie Bass (1876-1970); Stella Smith (1881-1940)

Robert Wilton Bass (September 16, 1921 – June 28, 1998) was a politician from Texas, United States, who served in the Texas House of Representatives from 1961-1969.

== Life ==
Bass was born on September 16, 1921, the youngest of 6 siblings. His parents were Allie Bass and Stella Smith. Bass married Joann Sheppard and they had two children: Portia Coye Bass (1940-2008) and Penny Bass (1946-2006). He died aged 76, and was buried at Texas State Cemetery.

== Politics ==
He was elected in the 1960 election, and served from January 10, 1961. He also won the 1962, 1964, and 1966 elections, serving until January 14, 1969.
