= Thomas Jefferson Chambers =

American politician

Member of the Texas House of Representatives from the 1st district
- In office February 8, 1870 – January 14, 1873
- Preceded by: Ambrose Dubley Kent
- Succeeded by: James H. Armstrong; Henry Harrison Ford; Arthur Thomas Watts

Personal details
- Born: March 22, 1840 Virginia, US
- Died: May 24, 1929 (aged 89) Texas, US
- Spouse(s): Mittie Smith; Frances Nolan
- Children: 12
- Parents: Landon Gore Chambers (father); Mary Green Allan (mother)

Thomas Jefferson Chambers (March 22, 1840 – May 24, 1929) was a newspaper editor and Texan politician who served in the Texas House from 1870 to 1873.

== Early life ==
Chambers was born on March 22, 1840. In 1858, Chambers married Mittie Smith. They had five children.

Thomas Jefferson Chambers was a nephew of Chambers County, Texas, namesake Gen. Thomas Jefferson Chambers of the Texas Army during its war for independence. Jeff Chambers was a newspaper editor, who served twice as mayor of Liberty, Texas, first in 1873–1875 and again in 1904–1906, and was elected to the Texas House of Representatives. He began his career in newspapers as a teenager working at a paper in his native Virginia before moving to Liberty with his family and working at the original Liberty Gazette, founded by Henry Shea in 1855.

Jeff Chambers bought the Gazette from Shea in 1857 or 1858 and operated it himself while still in his teens. He published the Gazette until 1869, but for the period of the Civil War, in which he served in the Confederate Army and was twice captured.

=== Civil War ===
Chambers enlisted as a private for the Confederates on March 17, 1862. On May 3, 1862, he was assigned to Captain Edward Bradford Pickett's Company, Third Regiment, Carter's Brigade, Texas Mounted Volunteers of the Twenty-fifth Texas Cavalry Regiment.

== Later life ==
His wife died sometime in the early 1870s. Sometime later, Chambers married Frances Nolan. They had 7 children together. Chambers died on May 24, 1929, at the age of 89.

Chambers resumed publication of The Liberty Gazette after the war, then sold the Gazette press in 1869 to G.W. O’Brien, who moved its press to Beaumont, where he published The Lumberman.

In the 1870s, he published The Observer in Liberty for several years.

Finally, in December 1887, Chambers began his last newspaper venture, The Liberty Vindicator, which remains in publication today as The Vindicator.
