= Henry Harrison Ford =

American politician (1844–1887)

Member of the Texas House of Representatives from the 1st district
- In office January 14, 1873 – January 13, 1874
- Preceded by: Thomas Jefferson Chambers; Joseph Grigsby Smyth; W. T. Simmons
- Succeeded by: James Bates Simpson; Dan Triplett; Pinkney Samuel Watts

Personal details
- Born: March 11, 1844 Mississippi, US
- Died: September 23, 1887 (aged 43) Jasper County, Texas, US
- Spouse(s): Eugenia Rebecca Stark (1849–1935)
- Children: 5

Henry Harrison Ford (March 11, 1844 - September 23, 1887) was a member of the Texas House from 1873 to 1874.

== Life ==
He was born on March 11, 1844, in Mississippi to David Ford and Maria Van Dyke Hamilton. He married Eugenia Rebecca Stark on May 9, 1867. They had 5 children born between 1868 and 1879. He died on September 23, 1887, at the age of 43.

=== Politics ===
He served in the Texas House from 1873 to 1874.
