= W. T. Simmons =

American politician

Member of the Texas House of Representatives from the 1st district
- In office February 16, 1870 – January 14, 1873
- Preceded by: Ambrose Dudley Kent
- Succeeded by: James H. Armstrong; Henry Harrison Ford; Arthur Thomas Watts

W. T. Simmons was a member of the Texas House from 1870 to 1873.

== Life ==
=== Early Years (Unknown-1870) ===
The only thing that most likely happened before he served in the Texas House was that he served in the Civil War.

=== Politics (1870-1873) ===
He served in the Texas House from February 1870 to January 1873.

==== Committees he served in ====
===== 1870 =====
- Member of the House Committee on Division of the State, Select
- Member of the House Committee on Education
- Member of the House Committee on House Officer and Employee Compensation, Select
- Member of the House Committee on Penitentiary

===== 1871 =====
- Member of the House Committee on Commerce and Manufactures
- Member of the House Committee on Public Buildings and Grounds
- Member of the House Committee on Regulate Pay of House Employees
- Member of the House Committee on Penitentiary

=== Later Years (1873-Unknown) ===
Not much is known, but he for sure died sometime after he was in the House.
