= Texarkana College =

Community college in Texarkana, Texas, US

Coordinates: 33°26′38″N 94°4′39″W

- Motto: A Great Place to Start ... Or Start Over
- Type: Public community college
- Established: 1927
- President: Jason Smith
- Undergraduates: 4,695
- Location: Texarkana, Texas, United States
- Campus: Urban
- Colors: Blue and White
- Nickname: Bulldog
- Website: texarkanacollege.edu

Texarkana College (formerly known as Texarkana Junior College) is a public community college in Texarkana, Texas.

== History ==
Texarkana College was founded in 1927 as part of the Texarkana Independent School District (TISD), then under the name Texarkana Junior College. Warren Woodson served as football coach from 1927-1934, leading to the college's admission to the Arkansas Intercollegate Athletic Association for the 1929 season. In 1941, the Texarkana College District was established. In 1948, twenty acres of land were purchased to provide for a new campus. In 1950, construction began and the college moved locations.

=== Integration effort ===
Throughout the late 1940s and the 1950s, the college was the focus of attempts by local black denizens—supported by the NAACP—to desegregate the college. Two groups of prospective black students separately sued the college in the United States District Court for the Northern District of Texas, in Bruce v. Stilwell (1953) and Whitmore v. Stilwell (1956). Throughout the multi-year process—though some junior colleges in the state had acceded to integration—the TISD offered alternatives, including split schedules for white and black students or a separate black-only junior college. The August 1956 judgment in Whitmore stated that the TISD could not refuse admission to black students for race-based reasons.

After the judgment, multiple black students successfully enrolled at the school on September 6. At a meeting of the local white Citizen's Council the same day, TISD president H.W. Stilwell exhorted attendees that "it is not only your right, but your duty to resist" desegregation. On the first day of classes, a group of hundreds of white demonstrators gathered to prevent entry to black students. Ulysses Simpson Tate, who represented the students in Bruce and Whitmore, requested help from President Dwight Eisenhower, writing that they were approaching "a state of anarchy" with the nullification of the court order. When the help was not forthcoming, Tate attempted to sue Stilwell and the TISD board for contempt of court, but he was forced to dismiss the case due to technical reasons. The crisis later played a major role in the state's attempt to ban the NAACP in Texas v. NAACP.

=== Later history ===
In 1957, the college became independent from the school district when the members of the board of the Texarkana Independent School District (who had also been serving as a board of regents of the college) voted to separate the two boards. The school eventually integrated in June 1963, which resulted in a public cross burning by local white youths. In 1971, Texarkana College began a partnership with East Texas State University to allow for greater compatibility between the two institutions' curricula.

==== Financial difficulties ====
In the 2000s, the college began to face repeated budget shortfalls and stagnant graduation rates. To raise money, College President James Russell solicited a $5 million matching donation from alumnus Ross Perot in 2011. Continuing to cut programs amidst funding issues, the college campaigned for an expansion of the school's tax base. The college had previously only taxed residents within a specific 16-square-mile area in Texarkana; the November 2012 ballot initiative would instead tax all of Bowie County, also allowing for defrayed admission costs for county residents. Though the proposal was initially unpopular given high anti-tax sentiment in the area, the initiative passed.

The increased funds coincided with what EdSurge identified as the college's turnaround. Graduation rates increased from 9 percent in 2008 to 36 percent in 2017, which was among the highest in the state for community colleges.

== Programs ==
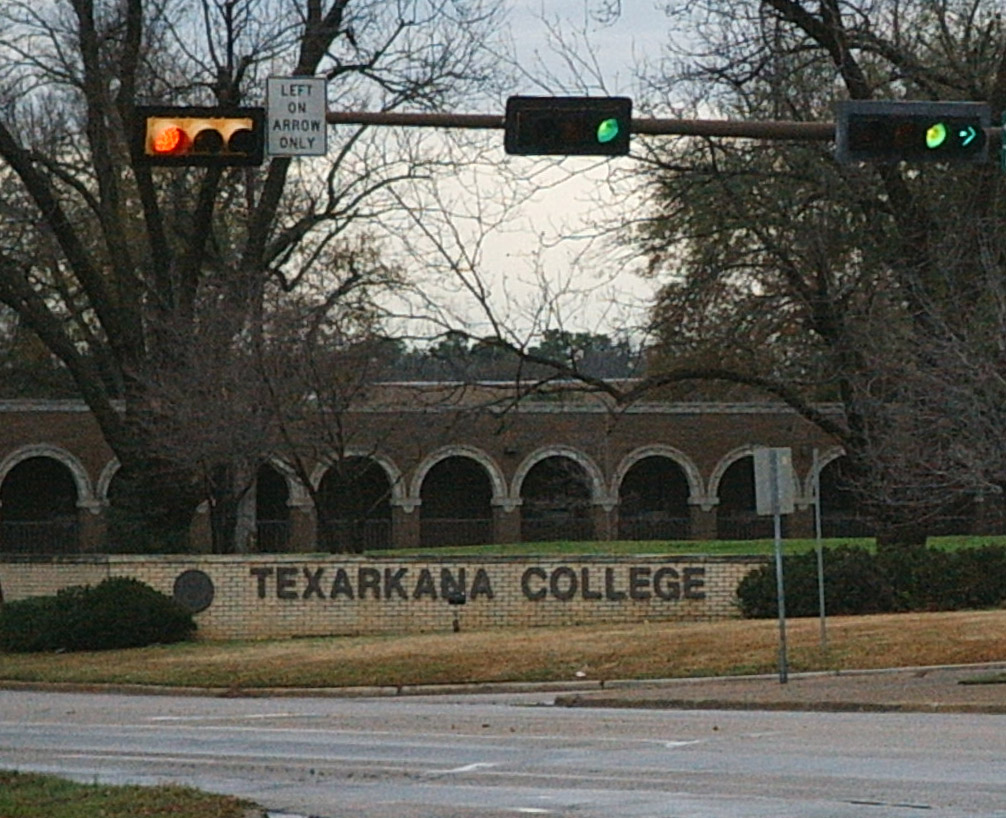
Southwest corner of Texarkana College campus

=== Academics ===
The college offers associate degree programs, certificate programs, and non-credit courses It is also home to the Bill Moran School of Bladesmithing. The college's bladesmithing program is associated with the American Bladesmith Society and was established by William F. Moran.The college also offers classes at the Barry Telford Unit state prison.

In 2022, the college had 3,794 students.The college is governed by a board of trustees. Jason Smith is the current president of the college.

=== Athletics ===
The college was formerly home to the Texarkana Bulldogs football team and the Texarkana Bulldogs baseball team. The college has formerly been part of the National Junior College Athletic Association, the Texas Junior College Conference, the Texas Eastern Conference, and the Southwest Junior College Football Conference.

=== Accreditation ===
The college is accredited by the Southern Association of Colleges and Schools Commission on Colleges. Individual programs are also accredited by the Accreditation Commission for Education in Nursing and the Commission on Accreditation of Allied Health Education Programs.

== Notable alumni ==
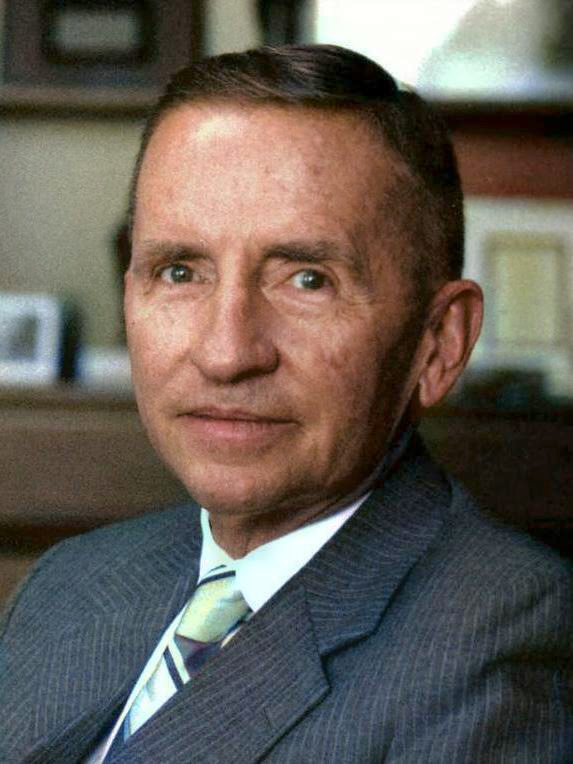
Ross Perot in 1986

=== Business and politics ===
- Ross Perot, American businessman and politician (founder of Electronic Data Systems and Perot Systems, known for his third party presidential campaigns in 1992 and 1996)
- Barry B. Telford, American politician (former member of the Texas House of Representatives)
- Fonda Hawthorne, American politician (former member of the Arkansas House of Representatives)
- Larry Teague, American politician (former member of the Arkansas Senate and the Arkansas House of Representatives)

=== Sports ===
- Hunter Pence, American baseball player (player for the Houston Astros, Philadelphia Phillies, San Francisco Giants, and Texas Rangers)
- Danny Ardoin, American baseball player (player for the Minnesota Twins, Texas Rangers, Colorado Rockies, Baltimore Orioles, and Los Angeles Dodgers)
- Tyler Eppler, American baseball player (player for the Wei Chuan Dragons, Orix Buffaloes, Kiwoom Heroes, and Fubon Guardians)
- Steven Trout, American baseball coach (head baseball coach of Texas State University)
- John Briscoe, American baseball player (player for the Oakland Athletics)
- Melvin Bunch, American baseball player (player for the Kansas City Royals, Seattle Mariners, and Chunichi Dragons)
- Buddy Carlyle, American baseball player (player for the San Diego Padres, Los Angeles Dodgers, Atlanta Braves, New York Yankees, New York Mets, LG Twins, Hanshin Tigers and Hokkaido Nippon-Ham Fighters)
- José De La Torre, Puerto Rican baseball player (player for the Boston Red Sox)
- Bryant Nelson, American baseball player (player for the Boston Red Sox)
- Phil Norton, American baseball player (player for the Chicago Cubs and Cincinnati Reds)
- Jamie Pogue, Canadian baseball coach (assistant coach for the St. Louis Cardinals)
- Andrew Russell, Australian baseball player (player for the Australia national baseball team)
- Drew Sutton, American baseball player (player for the Cincinnati Reds, Cleveland Indians, Boston Red Sox, Tampa Bay Rays, and Pittsburgh Pirates)
- David Welch, American baseball player (player for the Milwaukee Brewers and Sydney Blue Sox)
- Daniel Berg, American baseball player (player for the Minnesota Twins and Victoria Aces)
- Ryan Lynch, American race car driver (competing in the NASCAR Craftsman Truck Series)

=== Music ===
- Karmyn Tyler, American singer and beauty pageant contestant
