= Thomas Hinds Duggan =

American politician

Thomas Hinds Duggan (20 April 1815 – 26 December 1865) was an early Texas settler and two-time Texas State Senator from Guadalupe County, Texas.

Duggan was born in Jefferson County, Mississippi to Edmund Duggan and the former Elizabeth Alston. He married Elizabeth Berry on 20 May 1834. As a young man in Rodney, Mississippi, he worked as a merchant outfitting parties leaving for Texas. After applying to empresario Joseph Vehlein for land in 1835, he and family first moved to Austin in the fall of 1839. When Native American attacks on the then-frontier town became too much, Duggan moved his family, eventually settling just east of Seguin in present-day Guadalupe County, Texas. When Guadalupe County was organized in 1846, he was its first County Clerk.

In 1850, Duggan was first elected to the Texas Senate from the 23rd District for service in the Fourth Texas Legislature. After a failed bid for re-election, Duggan was again elected in 1858, this time from the 27th district, to serve in the Eighth Legislature. It was during this session he voted for secession prior to the Civil War. After losing a re-election bid to Stephen Heard Darden (for the 25th district), Duggan, at age 46, joined the Texas militia. His service during the conflict was limited to Texas.

At the close of the Civil War, Duggan, as a politician, was required to have a presidential pardon. Though it was not necessary that he do it in person — he journeyed to Washington, D.C. where he secured a pardon from Andrew Johnson. The hardships of the journey aggravated an old injury, and after his return to Seguin, he died on 26 December 1865. He is buried in the San Geronimo Cemetery.

Duggan was the grandfather of Texas State Senator Arthur Pope Duggan.

Texas Senate
Preceded by None	Texas State Senator from District 23 (Seguin); 1851–1853	Succeeded by James H. Armstrong
Preceded by Henry Eustace McCulloch	Texas State Senator from District 27 (Seguin); 1859–1861	Succeeded by John N. Houston
