= George Washington McCoppin =

American politician

Member of the Texas House of Representatives from the 1st district
- In office January 8, 1957 – January 8, 1963
- Preceded by: Thomas H. Stilwell
- Succeeded by: Robert Wilton Bass

Personal details
- Born: November 3, 1904
- Died: July 1, 1993 (aged 88)
- Spouse: Alice Ann Johnson
- Children: 2
- Parents: Edward Richard McCoppin (father); Zema Phillips (mother)

George Washington McCoppin (November 3, 1904 - July 1, 1993) was a former Texas House member who served in the House from 1957 to 1963.

== Life ==
McCoppin was born on November 3, 1904, to Edward Richard McCoppin and Zema Phillips. He married Alice Ann Johnson and had 2 children together. Their children are named George Edward McCoppin (1936-?) and Sally Beth McCoppin (1939-?). McCoppin died on July 1, 1993, at the age of 88. He is buried at Hillcrest Cemetery in Texarkana.
