= Gary VanDeaver =

American educator and state representative

Member of the Texas House of Representatives from the 1st district
- In office January 13, 2015 – September 21, 2026
- Preceded by: George Lavender
- Succeeded by: Chris Spencer (elect)

Personal details
- Born: September 25, 1958 (age 68) Grimes County, Texas, U.S.
- Party: Republican
- Spouse: Pamela Sue Nevill VanDeaver (m. 1983)
- Children: 2
- Education: East Texas State University
- Occupation: Educator

Gary Wayne VanDeaver (born September 25, 1958) is an American politician who served as the state representative for the Texas House of Representatives' 1st district, which encompasses Bowie, Cass, Lamar, Morris, and Red River counties in northeastern Texas. He is a retired lifelong educator with the Avery Independent School District, Rivercrest Independent School District and finally at New Boston Independent School District in New Boston, Texas, where he still resides. In December 2025, VanDeaver announced that he would not seek re-election in 2026.

VanDeaver was first elected in 2014 and was re-elected by his district four times, in 2016, 2018, 2020, and 2022, identifying as a conservative Republican. He defeated the previous incumbent, George Lavender, on three occasions and never faced opposition in a general election.

== Early life ==
VanDeaver was born in Grimes County south of College Station, Texas. He grew up on a cattle ranch in Red River County outside of Clarksville, Texas.

== Political career ==
VanDeaver was first elected to the Texas House of Representatives in 2014, defeating the incumbent George Lavender by 54.34%-45.66% in the 2014 Republican primary election. VanDeaver faced no opposition in the 2014 general election.

VanDeaver easily defeated Lavender in a rematch in the 2016 Republican primary on March 1, 2016. VanDeaver received 18,263 votes (61.93 percent) to Lavender's 11,242 (38.07 percent). VanDeaver faced no opposition in the 2016 general election.

VanDeaver ran unopposed in the 2018 Republican primary. VanDeaver ran unopposed in the general election held on November 6, 2018.

VanDeaver ran unopposed in the 2020 Republican primary. VanDeaver ran unopposed in the general election held on November 3, 2020.

VanDeaver ran again in the 2022 Republican primary, once again defeating Lavender (and a third candidate, Ray Null); the margin being 62.88%-28.96% over Lavender with Null taking only 8.16%. As with his previous general election races, VanDeaver again faced no opposition.

VanDeaver ran in the 2024 Republican primary against Chris Spencer and Dale Huls. VanDeaver received 45.5% of the primary vote, while Spencer garnered 43.0% and Huls received 11.4%, resulting in a runoff election. In the Republican primary runoff, VanDeaver defeated Spencer with 53.5% of the vote, while Spencer received 46.5%.

On December 1, 2025, VanDeaver announced that he would not seek re-election to a seventh term in the Texas House of Representatives, stating that he would serve out the remainder of his term until January 2027. He was one of only two Republicans to oppose school vouchers, the other being former Speaker Dade Phelan. VanDeaver was also one of five representatives censured by the Republican Party of Texas for opposing some of its priorities and for supporting Speaker Dustin Burrows. In closing his political career, he said, "While much of my work over the past decade has been with a focus on making Texas better, I have always tried to view that work through the lens of ensuring rural Texas, and especially our little corner here in Northeast Texas, is positioned for the brightest future possible." He later opted to resign his house seat in September 2026.

The Texas Association of School Boards announced VanDeaver would join the nonprofit organization as executive director beginning October 1, 2026.

Texas House of Representatives
Preceded by George Lavender	Member of the Texas House of Representatives from the 1st district 2015–2026	Vacant
