= Tu che di gel sei cinta =

Aria by Puccini

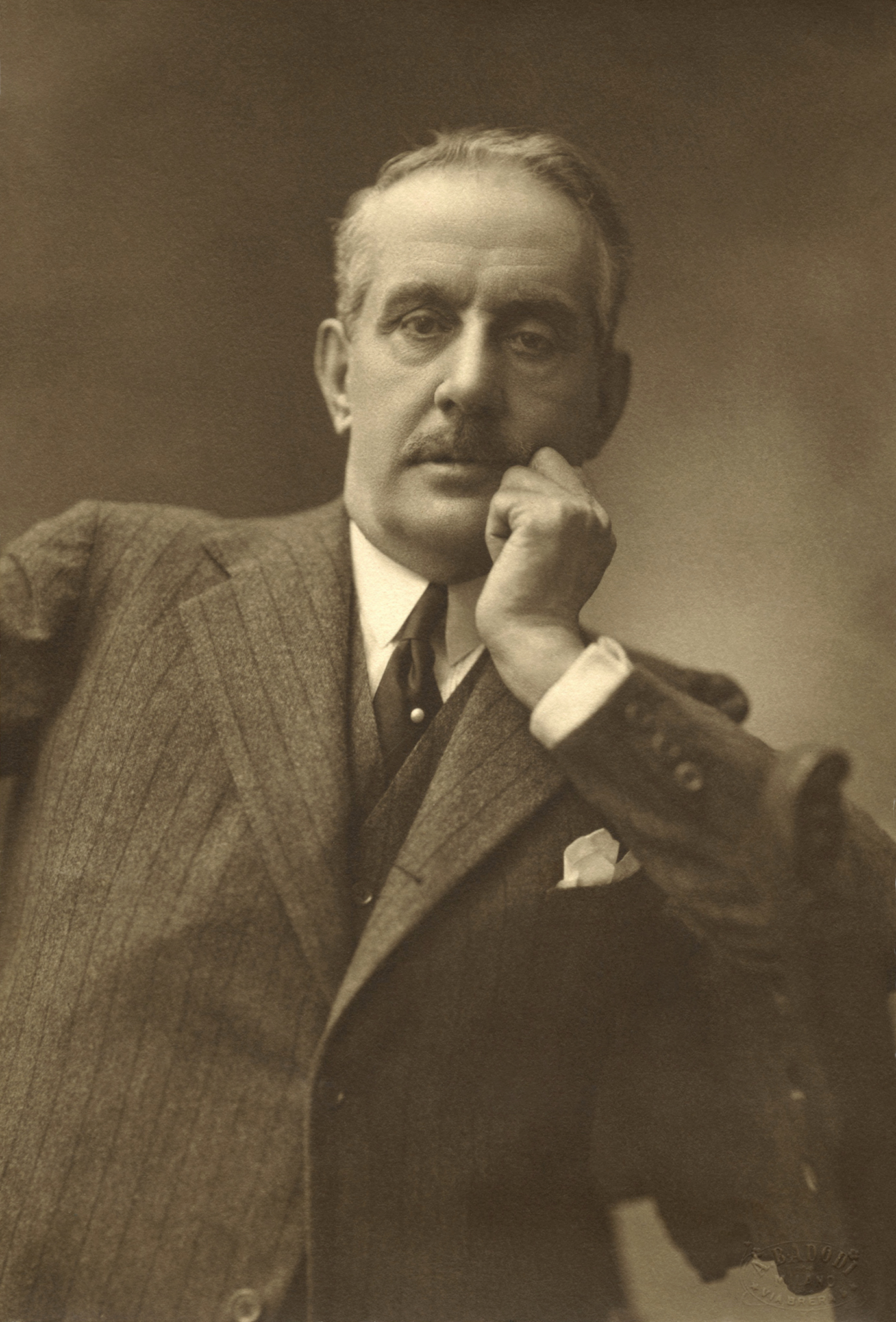
Giacomo Puccini, 1924

"Tu che di gel sei cinta" ("You who are girdled with ice") is a soprano aria from act 3, scene 1, of Puccini's 1926 opera Turandot. It is sung by Liù under torture, prior to her suicide.

The words were written by Puccini himself while waiting for librettists Giuseppe Adami and Renato Simoni to deliver the next part of the libretto. When the librettists read it, they decided that they could not improve on Puccini’s text. In their work on Turandot, Ashbrook and Powers suggest that Puccini's failure to complete the opera much beyond this point resulted mainly from inadequate dramatic build-up for Turandot's last-minute change of heart combined with an overly successful treatment of the secondary character (i.e. Liù).

== Background ==
Princess Turandot is taken aback by Liù's strong resolve by not revealing the name of the Prince, and asked her:

Turandot:
Chi pose tanta forza nel tuo cuore?
Liù:
Principessa, l'amore!
Turandot:
L'amore?

Who put so much strength into your heart?

Princess, Love!

Love?

Turandot was furious with the answer, and ordered Ping to continue torturing Liù. Liù counters Turandot with this aria, and later seized a dagger from a soldier's belt and stabs herself. In the following moments, the blind Timur tries to wake Liù, saying it is dawn ("Liù, Liù, sorgi, sorgi"). When told she is dead, he cries out in anguish that her offended spirit will take revenge, and Liù's cortège moves off, with Timur vowing to accompany her into "the night which knows no dawn".

== Libretto ==
Tu che di gel sei cinta
da tanta fiamma vinta
L'amerai anche tu!
Prima di quest'aurora
io chiudo stanca gli occhi
perché egli vinca ancora...
egli vinca ancora...
per non, per non vederlo più!
Prima di quest'aurora, di quest'aurora
io chiudo stanca gli occhi
per non vederlo più!

You who are girdled with ice
Once conquered by so much flame
You will love him too!
Before this dawn
I will close my weary eyes
So that he may still win
He may still win...
To not, to not see him any more!
Before this dawn, this dawn
I will close my weary eyes
To not see him any more!
