= Arthur Thomas Watts =

American politician

Member of the Texas House of Representatives from the 1st district
- In office January 14, 1873 – January 13, 1874
- Preceded by: Thomas Jefferson Chambers; Joseph Grigsby Smyth; W. T. Simmons
- Succeeded by: James Bates Simpson; Dan Triplett; Pinkney Samuel Watts

Personal details
- Born: August 31, 1837 Covington County, Mississippi
- Died: June 28, 1921 (aged 83) Beaumont, Jefferson, Texas
- Spouse(s): Mary E. Victory (1849-1890)
- Children: 4
- Parents: William Watts (1804-1845) (father); Patience Lott (1807-1900) (mother)

Arthur Thomas Watts (August 31, 1837 – June 28, 1921) was a Texan politician who served in the Texas House from 1873 to 1874.

== Life ==
=== Early life and war (1837-1873) ===
Watts was born on August 31, 1837, in Covington County, Mississippi, to Patience Lott and William Watts. He was the middle child of 3 children. His parents moved to Texas in 1841 while he stayed in Mississippi. He would later move to Texas and was admitted to the bar in 1859. In 1861, he moved back to Mississippi to fight in the American Civil War. He fought alongside Stonewall Jackson for a bit. He was later wounded at the second battle of Manassas, and again, on May 12, 1864, at Spottsylvania Courthouse.

=== Children ===
Arthur married Mary E. Victory sometime before their first child.
On March 26, 1870, they had Mary Ellen Watts. She would live to be 85 years old.
On August 30, 1872, they had Mattie McClanahan Watts. She would live to be 5 years old.
On September 27, 1879, they had Rosa D. Watts. She would live to be 53 years old. She is the only one to marry and have kids. She had 2 children with Silas Gary Byrnett.
In April 1881, they had Commissa Appellate Watts. She would only live to be at most 4 months old.

=== Politics (1873-1874) ===
He served in the Texas House from 1873 to 1874.

=== Later Years (1874-1921) ===
The last known place he was at was in Beaumont, Jefferson, Texas, in the 1920 census. He died on June 28, 1921, at the age of 83. Only 2 of his 4 children made it past the age of 5.
