= Margia Dean =

American actress (1922–2023)

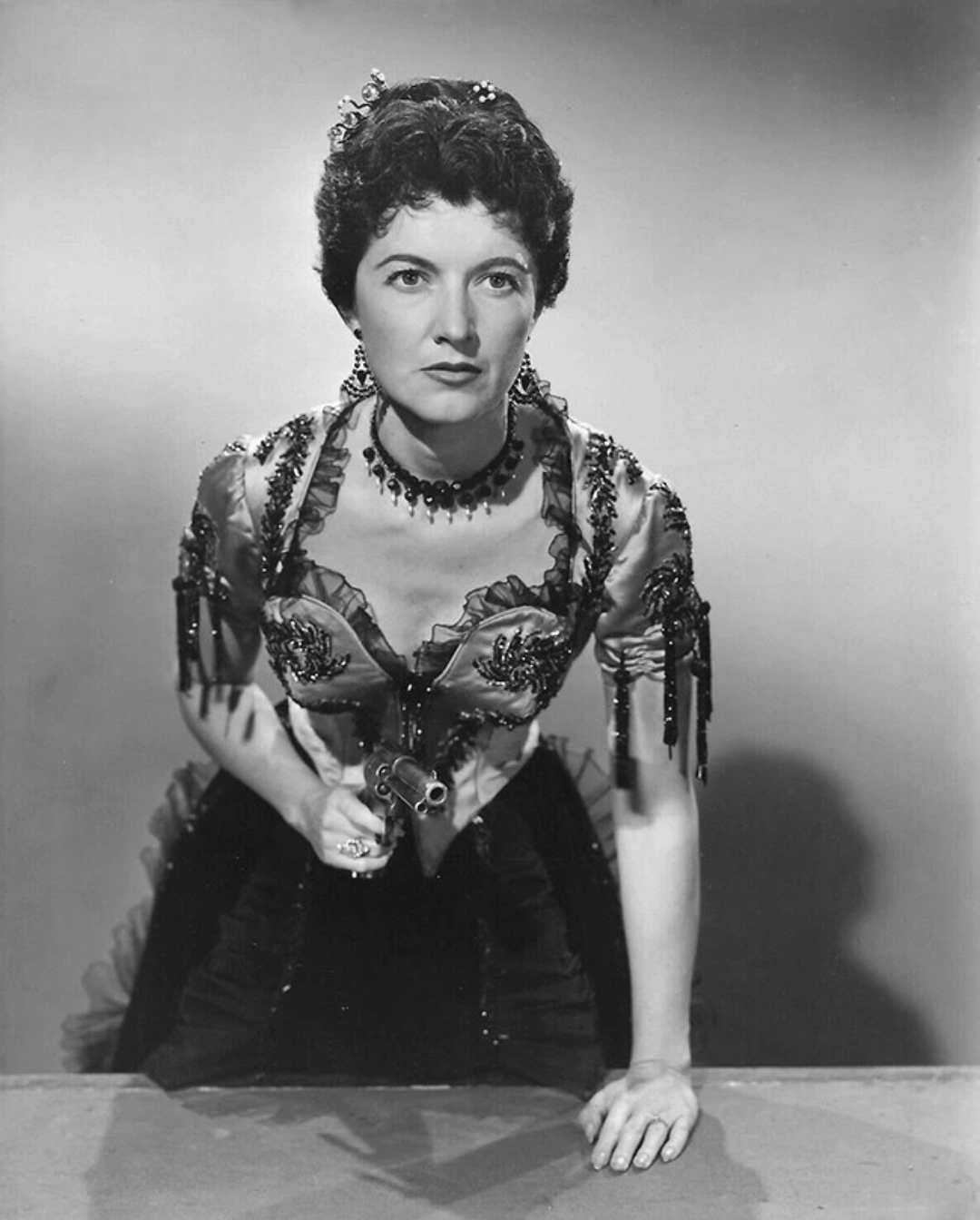
- Dean in 1956
- Born: Marguerite Louise Skliris; April 7, 1922; Chicago, Illinois, U.S.
- Died: June 23, 2023 (aged 101); Rancho Cucamonga, California, U.S.
- Occupations: Beauty queen, actress
- Years active: 1929–1964
- Spouses: Hal Fischer (m. 1939–1945) Felipe Alvarez (m. 1965)

Marguerite Louise Skliris-Alvarez (née Skliris; April 7, 1922 – June 23, 2023), known by her stage name Margia Dean (name is pronounced as Mar-juh) was an American beauty queen and stage and screen actress of royal Greek descent, who had a career in Hollywood films from the 1940s until the early 1960s, appearing in 30 starring roles and 20 bit parts. She is not to be confused with Marjorie Deanne, a Hollywood actress active from 1938 to 1943.

== Biography ==
=== Early life and career ===
Marguerite Louise Skliris was born in Chicago to Evangelis Skliris, a lawyer, and his wife who studied in Paris, France. Her grandfather owned all of the railroads in Greece, her great-great-grandfather had risen to become the regent of Greece, the family had emigrated from Athens to the United States in 1913, settling in Chicago before Margia was born, but moved to San Francisco, California when she was at a young age.

Dean began acting at the age of 7, appearing on stage in many child roles and later won the Women's National Shakespeare Contest for her role as Juliet in a production of Romeo and Juliet. She also took up modelling and was named "Miss San Francisco" and "Miss California" in 1939. She was a top-five runner-up to Patricia Donnelly in the "Miss America 1939" competition.

=== Theatre ===
After her modelling, she was told that had she stayed in New York she would have been on Broadway, but as her mother was working, she returned to San Francisco to finish her education. She did, however, start her career in the theatre genre, working with the Geary and Curren Theatre and then with the Biltmore Theatre in Los Angeles.

=== Film career ===
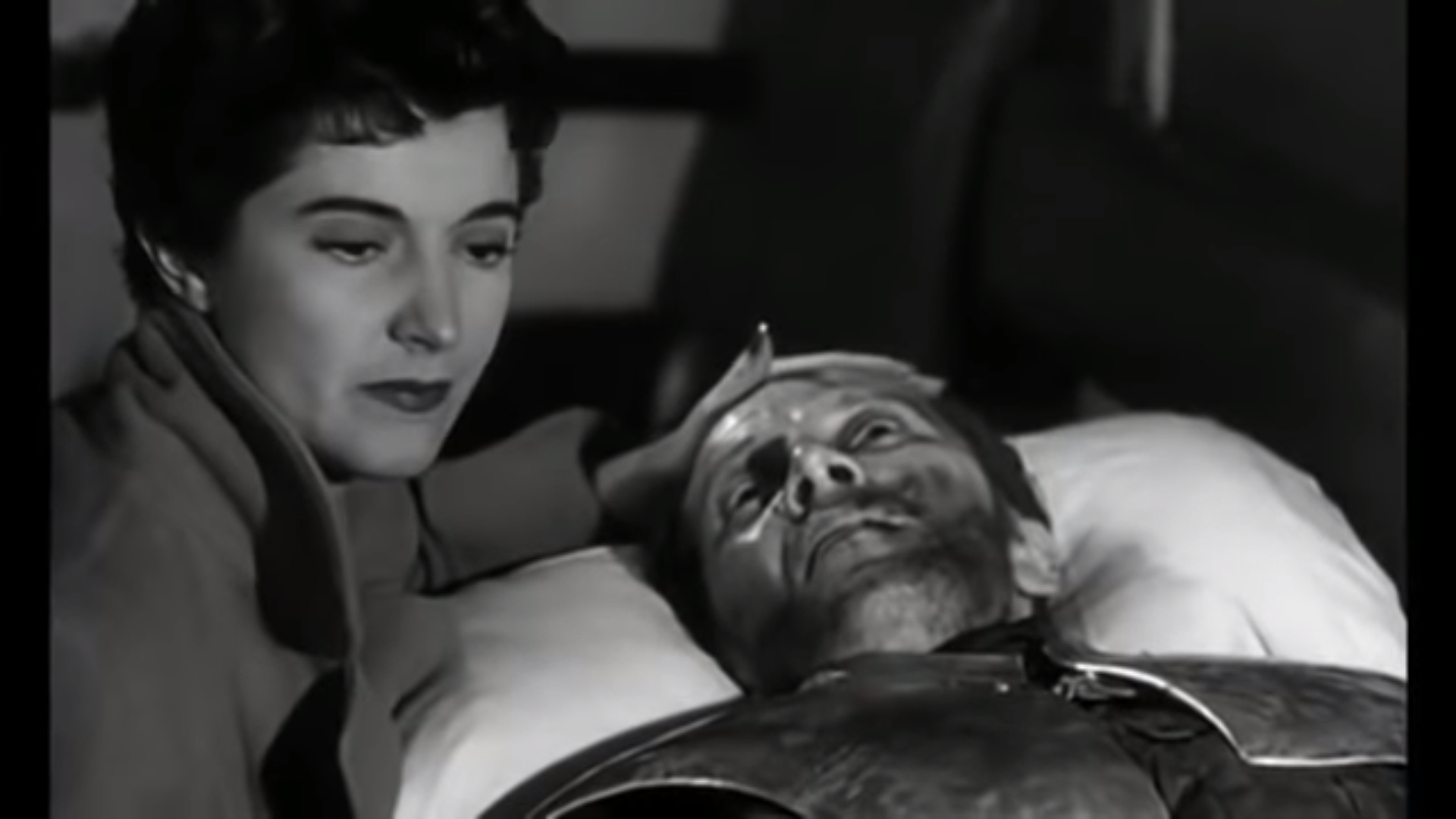
Margia Dean in The Quatermass Xperiment

Dean made her feature film debut in Casanova in Burlesque (1944) and adopted her stage name, Margia Dean.

Although never under contract to any studio, she worked variously at Republic Pictures, Columbia Pictures and Paramount Pictures, although for the majority of her films, was with both 20th Century Fox and some 16 in all, for Lippert Pictures under the producer Robert L. Lippert, and she became known as the Queen of Lippert.

Her first leading role was in Shep Comes Home (1948) and roles followed in Red Desert (1949), FBI Girl (1951), The Lonesome Trail (1955), Villa!! (1958) and Seven Women from Hell (1961). Dean starred in a 1958 Western, Ambush at Cimarron Pass, featuring a very young Clint Eastwood in one of his earliest film roles. She also portrayed a trapeze artist in the 1961 circus tale The Big Show, which starred Esther Williams, Cliff Robertson, Nehemiah Persoff, David Nelson and Robert Vaughn.

Her association with Lippert led to her being cast in The Quatermass Xperiment (1955), the first Hammer horror film.

Frustrated that her roles were predominantly in B movies, she eventually retired from acting following her marriage in 1965 to her second husband, architect Felipe Alvarez. Her final film was Moro Witch Doctor. She briefly became involved in movie production, creating Margo Productions and producing The Long Rope (1961) with Hugh Marlowe as well as a number of television pilots.

== Later life and death ==
Dean was later a vice-president in a real estate firm and worked in costume design and interior decoration. Dean died at her apartment in Rancho Cucamonga, California, on June 23, 2023, at the age of 101.

== Filmography ==
- Casanova in Burlesque (1944)
- Call of the South Seas (1944)
- Take It Big (1944)
- The Desert Hawk (1944)
- Accent on Crime (1944)
- Minstrel Man (1944)
- Earl Carroll Vanities (1945)
- The Power of the Whistler (1945)
- Crime Doctor's Warning (1945)
- Who's Guilty? (1945)
- Living in a Big Way (1947)
- Shep Comes Home (1948)
- I Shot Jesse James (1949)
- Rimfire (1949)
- Grand Canyon (1949)
- Ringside (1949)
- Treasure of Monte Cristo (1949)
- Tough Assignment (1949)
- Red Desert (1949)
- The Baron of Arizona (1950)
- Western Pacific Agent (1950)
- Motor Patrol (1950)
- Hi-Jacked (1950)
- The Return of Jesse James (1950)
- Bandit Queen (1950)
- Fingerprints Don't Lie (1951)
- Mask of the Dragon (1951)
- Tales of Robin Hood (1951)
- Pier 23 (1951)
- Kentucky Jubilee (1951)
- Inside the Walls of Folsom Prison (1951)
- Savage Drums (1951)
- Take Care of My Little Girl (1951)
- Leave It to the Marines (1951)
- Sky High (1951)
- FBI Girl (1951)
- Superman and the Mole-Men (1951)
- Mr. Walkie Talkie (1952)
- Loan Shark (1952)
- Mesa of Lost Women (1953)
- Sins of Jezebel (1953)
- Fangs of the Wild (1954)
- The Lonesome Trail (1955)
- The Quatermass Xperiment (1955)
- Last of the Desperados (1955)
- The Revolt of Mamie Stover (1956)
- Frontier Gambler (1956)
- Stagecoach to Fury (1956)
- Badlands of Montana (1957)
- Ambush at Cimarron Pass (1958)
- Villa!! (1958)
- The Secret of the Purple Reef (1960)
- The Big Show (1961)
- 7 Women from Hell (1961)
- Moro Witch Doctor (1964)

Awards and achievements
Preceded by Claire James	Miss California; 1939	Succeeded by Rosemary LaPlanche
