= Miss America 1939 =

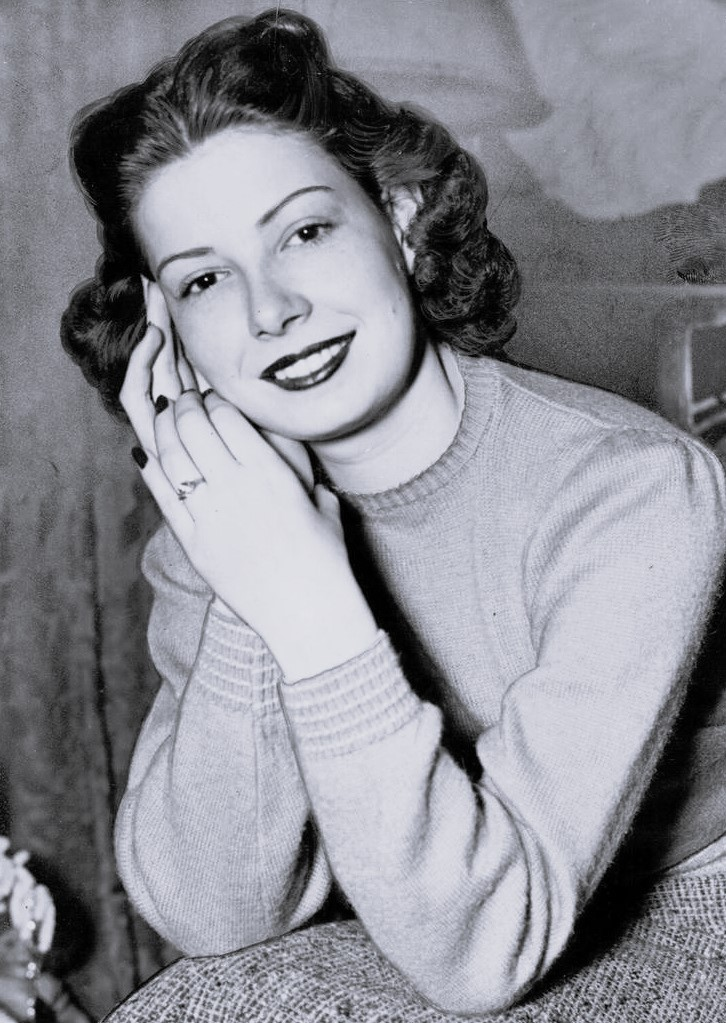
- Date: September 9, 1939
- Venue: Steel Pier, Atlantic City, New Jersey
- Entrants: 43
- Placements: 15
- Winner: Patricia Donnelly; Michigan

Miss America 1939, the 13th Miss America pageant, was the last pageant to be held at the famed Steel Pier in Atlantic City, New Jersey. The finals were held on Saturday, September 9, 1939, and Miss Michigan, Patricia Donnelly, was crowned Miss America 1939. The Miss Congeniality Award was also introduced at the 1939 competition.

Donnelly later became a singer and actress. Third runner-up Marguerita Skliris became the actress Margia Dean, who starred in such Hollywood films as Seven Women from Hell and The Quatermass Xperiment. Fourth runner-up Rose Marie Elliott had a successful musical career on the Broadway stage as Rose Marie Brown.

== Results ==
=== Placements ===
Placement	Contestant
Miss America 1939	Michigan – Patricia Donnelly
1st Runner-Up	Oklahoma – Bettye Cornelia Avert
2nd Runner-Up	Washington – Anna Mae Schoonover
3rd Runner-Up	California – Marguerita Louise Skliris
4th Runner-Up	Virginia – Rose Marie Elliott
Top 15	Birmingham – Florine Holt; Chicago – Ethel Lorraine Lobdell; Eastern New York – Clare E. Foley; Florida – Rose Marie Magrill; Miami – Irmigard Margaret Dietel; Minnesota – Marion June Rudeen; New Jersey – Margo Lundgren; North Carolina – Margaret Wood; Sun Valley – E. Louise Fletchner; Texas – Charmayne Smith

=== Awards ===
==== Preliminary awards ====
Award	Contestant
Talent	California - Marguerita Louise Skliris; Minnesota - Marion June Rudeen; North Carolina - Margaret Wood

=== Other awards ===
Award	Contestant
Miss Congeniality	Mississippi - Doris Coggins

== Contestants ==
Title	Name	Hometown	Age	Talent	Placement	Awards	Notes
Birmingham	Florine Holt	Birmingham		Vocal, "Moonglow" & "A Little Bit of Heaven"	Top 15		
Arkansas	Jean Thompson	Helena					
California	Marguerita Skliris	San Francisco		Dramatic Monologue, "The Poison Scene" from Romeo and Juliet	3rd Runner-up	Preliminary Talent Award	Later known as actress Margia Dean
Central Connecticut	Catherine Harrison	Derby					
Charlotte	Marguerite Taylor	Charlotte					
Connecticut	Frieda Lampar	Bridgeport					
Coney Island	Grayce M. Reilly						
(Washington, D.C.) District of Columbia	Evelyn Foster		19	Ballet en Pointe			
Eastern New York	Claire E. Foley			Vocal Comedy & Dance	Top 15		
Eastern Ohio	Maxine Drumm						
Eastern Pennsylvania	Emma Louise Knoell	Philadelphia					
Florida	Rose Marie Magrill	Miami		Tap Dance	Top 15		
(Georgia (U.S. state)) Georgia	Mary Durrance	Glennville		Vocal			
Illinois	Ethel Lorraine Lodbell	Chicago		Monologue, "From the Diary of a Contestant"	Top 15		
Kansas	Rosemary Winslow	Salina					
Kentucky	Louise Holman	Pineville					
Lexington	Mattigene Palmore	Lexington					
Maryland	Elaine Pasqualla	Crisfield					
Miami	Irmigard Dietel	Miami		Vocal Medley, "See You Again", "Blue Evening", & "Solitude"	Top 15		
Michigan	Patricia Donnelly	Detroit	19	Vocal/Bass Fiddle, "To You" & "Ol' Man Mose"	Winner		
Minnesota	Marion Rudeen	Minneapolis		Acrobatic Dance	Top 15	Preliminary Talent Award	
Mississippi	Doris Coggins	Baldwyn				Miss Congeniality	
Missouri	Margaret Ley	St. Louis					
Montana	Lucille Chouinard	Fort Peck					
Montgomery	Louise Robertson	Montgomery					
Myrtle Beach	Mary Eleanor Parish	Myrtle Beach					
New Hampshire	Lois Marjorie Truax	Nashua					
New Jersey	Margo Lundgren	Harrison		Whistling Tunes Vocal, "Don't Worry About Me"	Top 15		
New Orleans	Frances Helen Anello	New Orleans					
North Carolina	Margaret Wood			Vocal, "If I Didn't Care"	Top 15	Preliminary Talent Award	
Ohio	Jeanne Saboda	Cleveland					
Oklahoma	Bettye Cornelia Avert	Oklahoma City		Original Piano & Vocal, "Wondering & Dreaming"	1st Runner-up		
Pennsylvania	Ruth Phyllis Willock	Pittsburgh					
Philadelphia	Nancy Lee	Philadelphia					
South Carolina	Margaret Allan Shealy	Clinton		Vocal, "Especially for You"			
Staten Island	Lillian Evelyn Hessen	Annadale					
Sun Valley	E. Louise Fletchner			Clarinet, "Stardust"	Top 15		E. Louise Flechtner Brierton died at age 99 on May 5, 2020 in Pennsylvania.
Tennessee	Judy Jones	Tracy City		Vocal Medley, "I Surrender" & "Come True"			
Texas	Charmayne Smith	Dallas		Vocal, "Round Up Time in Texas"	Top 15		
Virginia	Rose Marie Elliot	Sulfolk		Vocal, "Smoke Gets in Your Eyes"	4th Runner-up		Later known on Broadway as Rose Marie Brown
(Washington (state)) Washington	Anna Mae Schoonover	Seattle		Dramatic Monologue from Accent on Youth	2nd Runner-up		
Western Tennessee	Louise Bussart	Etowah					
