= Courtney Thomas =

American beauty pageant titleholder

- Born: Courtney Elizabeth Thomas; October 30, 1988 (age 37); Sigel, Pennsylvania
- Education: Drexel University; Shippensburg University of Pennsylvania
- Beauty pageant titleholder
- Title: Miss MidState 2007; Miss Moraine State 2008; Miss Cambria County 2009; Miss Jewel of the West 2010; Miss Pennsylvania 2010
- Hair color: Brunette
- Eye color: Brown
- Major competitions: National Sweetheart 2009 (Top 10); Miss America 2011

Courtney Elizabeth Thomas (born October 30, 1988) is an American beauty pageant titleholder from the village of Sigel in Eldred Township Pennsylvania who was named Miss Pennsylvania 2010.

== Biography ==
Thomas won the title of Miss Pennsylvania on June 19, 2010, when she received her crown from outgoing titleholder Shannon Doyle. Thomas's platform is “Don't C.O.P.P. Out! Consequences Of Peer Pressure." Shortly before her 15th birthday, Thomas was severely injured as a passenger in a car accident caused by a drunk driver in which she broke both of her arms and legs. According to Thomas, her story “about rising above the Consequences Of Peer Pressure encourages youth as well as adults to take inventory of their lives and to think about every decision they make so that a bad decision won't end their life prematurely, or have a negative impact on their life.” As of 2010 Thomas was a senior biological sciences major at Drexel University. She at that time hoped to become a physician with her own family practice.

Awards and achievements
Preceded by Shannon Doyle	Miss Pennsylvania; 2010	Succeeded by Juliann Sheldon
