= Miss America 1974 =

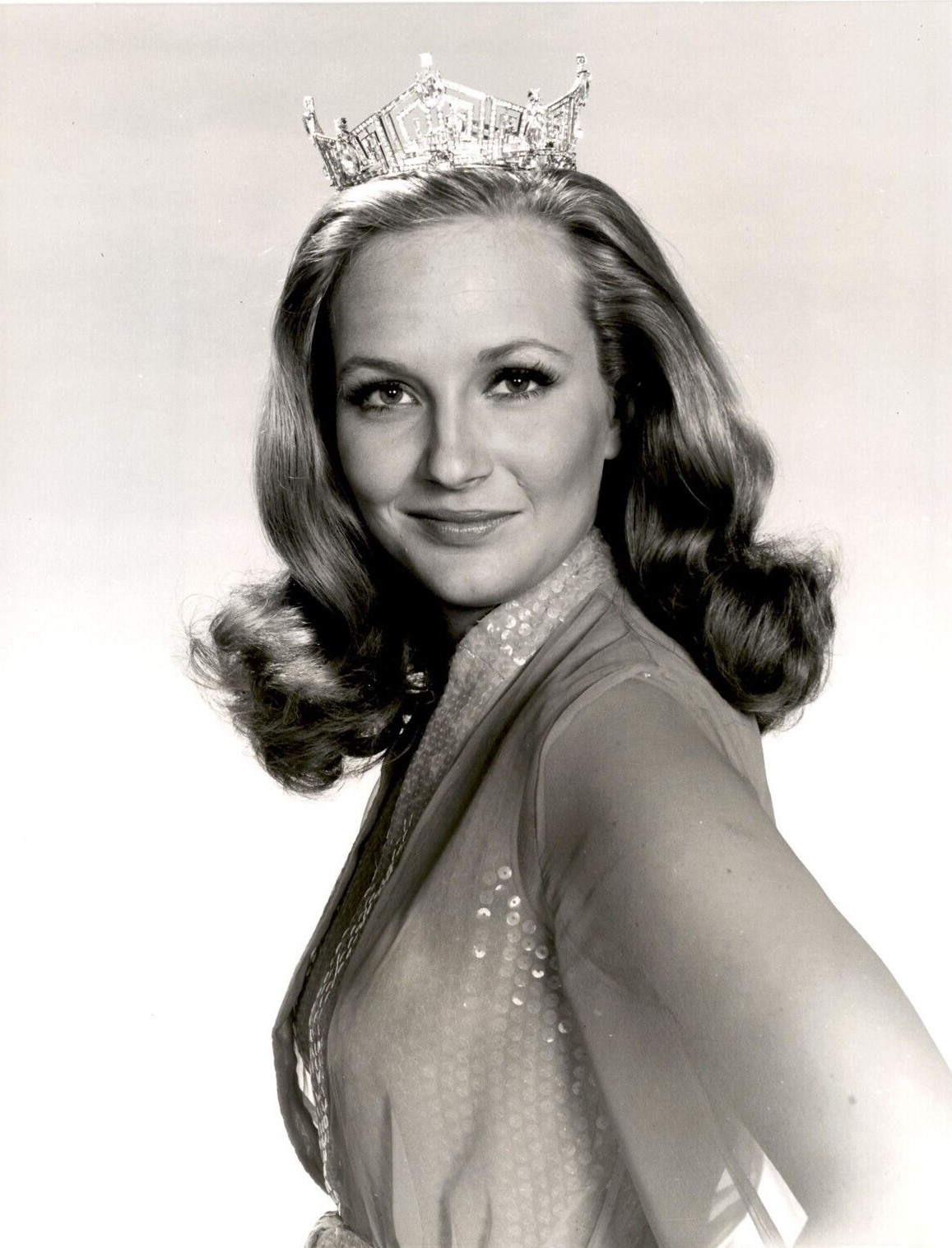
- Rebecca Ann King as Miss America 1974
- Date: September 8, 1973
- Presenters: Bert Parks
- Venue: Boardwalk Hall, Atlantic City, New Jersey
- Broadcaster: NBC
- Winner: Rebecca Ann King; Colorado

Miss America 1974, the 47th Miss America pageant, was held at the Boardwalk Hall in Atlantic City, New Jersey on September 8, 1973, and broadcast on NBC.

The winner was Rebecca Ann King, whose daughter Diana Dreman would become Miss Colorado and a contender for Miss America 2012, the first daughter of a victorious Miss America to compete in the pageant.

Suzanne Plummer, second runner-up, is known today as Sue Lowden, who became chairperson of the Republican Party in Nevada and a 2010 U.S. Senate candidate there. Another contestant, Michelle Marshall of Missouri, is now the political analyst and blogger Taylor Marsh.

== Results ==
=== Placements ===
Placement	Contestant
Miss America 1974	Colorado – Rebecca Ann King
1st Runner-Up	Wisconsin – Judy Hieke
2nd Runner-Up	New Jersey – Suzanne Plummer
3rd Runner-Up	Louisiana – Debbie Ward
4th Runner-Up	Pennsylvania – Tina Louise Thomas
Top 10	California – Susan Shipley; Illinois – Colleen Metternich; Oklahoma – Andrea Hanson; Texas – Judy Mallett; Washington – Leslie Ann Mays

=== Awards ===
==== Preliminary awards ====
Awards	Contestant
Lifestyle and Fitness	New Jersey - Suzanne Plummer; (Washington (state)) Washington - Leslie Ann Mays; Wisconsin - Judy Hieke
Talent	Illinois - Colleen Metternich; Louisiana - Debbie Ward; Pennsylvania - Tina Louise Thomas

==== Other awards ====
Awards	Contestant
Non-finalist Talent	Florida - Ellen Rowena Meade; Massachusetts - Rena Diane Walmsley; Montana - Debbie Reber; New Hampshire - Michelle Annette Cote; Ohio - Cheryl Ann Yourkvitch; Utah - Brenda Richardson; Vermont - Joylynn McCraw
Miss Congeniality	Hawaii - Kanoelehua Kaumeheiwa
Neat as a Pin	Colorado – Rebecca Ann King (tie); (New Hampshire) Nevada – Echo Layne Ross (tie)
