= Casanova in Burlesque =

1944 film by Leslie Goodwins

- Theatrical release poster
- Directed by: Leslie Goodwins
- Screenplay by: Frank Gill Jr.
- Story by: John Wales
- Produced by: Albert J. Cohen
- Starring: Joe E. Brown; June Havoc; Dale Evans; Marjorie Gateson; Lucien Littlefield; Ian Keith
- Cinematography: Reggie Lanning
- Edited by: Ernest J. Nims
- Music by: Marlin Skiles
- Production company: Republic Pictures
- Distributed by: Republic Pictures
- Release date: February 29, 1944
- Running time: 74 minutes
- Country: United States
- Language: English

Casanova in Burlesque is a 1944 American comedy film directed by Leslie Goodwins and written by Frank Gill Jr.. The film stars Joe E. Brown, June Havoc, Dale Evans, Marjorie Gateson, Lucien Littlefield and Ian Keith. The film was released on February 29, 1944, by Republic Pictures.

== Plot ==
A stripper discovers that a professor spends summer teaching Shakespeare and winter as a burlesque comic.

== Cast ==
- Joe E. Brown as Joseph M. Kelly Jr.
- June Havoc as Lillian Colman
- Dale Evans as Barbara Compton
- Marjorie Gateson as Lucille Compton
- Lucien Littlefield as John Alden Compton
- Ian Keith as J. Boggs-Robinson
- Roger Imhof as Joseph M. Kelly Sr.
- Harry Tyler as Bucky Farrell
- Patricia Knox as Peewee Dixon
- Sugar Geise as Fannie
- Jerry Frank as Al Gordon
- Margia Dean as Burlesque Queen
