= Candace Otto =

American pageant titleholder

- Born: April 8, 1980 (age 46); Pittsburgh, Pennsylvania, U.S.
- Height: 5 ft 5 in (1.65 m)
- Beauty pageant titleholder
- Title: Miss Pennsylvania 2003
- Hair color: Brown
- Eye color: Brown
- Major competition: Miss America 2004

Candace Otto (born April 8, 1980, in Pittsburgh) is a pageant titleholder from Murrysville, Pennsylvania, who held the Miss Pennsylvania 2003 title and competed in the Miss America pageant.

== Pageants ==
Otto first competed in a pageant in 1996 when she competed at Miss Pennsylvania Teen USA. In 2001, while attending college in Evanston she entered the Miss Illinois contest and won the non-finalist talent award.

Two years later, after winning the Miss Three Rivers local title, Otto competed in her first Miss Pennsylvania pageant. She won the Talent award in preliminary competition and was crowned Miss Pennsylvania at the conclusion of the final competition on July 12, 2003. She was the first Miss Pennsylvania from Murrysville. Her win earned her a $6,000 scholarship.

In September she went on to compete in the Miss America 2004 pageant where she performed "Non Ti Scordar Di Me" as her talent selection, the same song she performed in the state pageant. At the Miss America Pageant, she was the first Miss Pennsylvania to win the Bernie Wayne Performing Arts Award and the first Miss Pennsylvania since 1991 to win a non-finalist talent award.

During her reign she made over 150 appearances as a keynote speaker or featured performer, travelling between 2,000 and 4,000 miles each month crisscrossing the state by car. Her platform issue "Challenging Americans to Address Poverty" was inspired by her work with National Student Partnerships (NSP), for which she served as co-director in 2001. She also appeared on the game show Pyramid Candace was a co-founder of NSP Evanston and has served on the advisory board of NSP Pittsburgh.

== Education and career ==
Otto is an accomplished performer and vocalist. She started taking acting classes at age six and in subsequent years performed in a number of minor roles that were noted in local newspapers. She then took voice lessons and joined the chorus of the Civic Light Opera. After graduating from Shady Side Academy in Pittsburgh, Pennsylvania, in 1998, she studied Musical Theater at Northwestern University. After graduation, Candace was given an opportunity to study opera with the Ezio Pinza Council of American Singers of Opera, in Italy. In November 2001 she performed with the Sistine choir before a papal audience of 250,000 at the Vatican City.

Otto married Matthew McDonald on June 10, 2006.
