= Miss Pennsylvania's Teen =

- Formation: 2005
- Type: Scholarship Pageant
- Location: York, Pennsylvania
- Members: Miss America's Teen
- Official language: English
- Website: Official website

The Miss Pennsylvania's Teen competition selects the representative for the Commonwealth of Pennsylvania in the Miss America's Teen Competition. The Miss Pennsylvania's Teen Competition is held each June at the Appell Center for Performing Arts in York, Pennsylvania.

Anna Rinnier of Bryn Mawr was crowned Miss Pennsylvania's Teen on June 19, 2026, at the Appell Center for Performing Arts in York, Pennsylvania. She competed for the title of Miss America's Teen 2027 on September 5, 2026, at the Kravis Center for the Performing Arts in West Palm Beach, Florida.

== Results summary ==
The following is a visual summary of the past results of Miss Pennsylvania's Teen titleholders presented in the table below. The year in parentheses indicates year of the Miss America's Teen competition in which the placement and/or award was garnered.

=== Placements ===
- 1st runners-up: Julia Rae Schlucter (2009), Cecilia Petrush (2019)
- 2nd runners-up: Elena LaQuatra (2008)
- Top 8: Page Mackenzie Weinstein (2015)
- Top 10: Jocelyn Gruber (2011), Riley Evans (2020)
- Top 11: Alysa Bainbridge (2017), Jaylen Baron (2021), Lynzi Allen (2026)

=== Awards ===
==== Preliminary awards ====
- Preliminary Evening Wear/On Stage Question: Elena LaQuatra (2008)
- Preliminary Talent: Cecilia Petrush (2019), Riley Evans (2020)
- Preliminary Evening Gown: Lynzi Allen (2026)

==== Non-finalist awards ====
- Non-finalist Evening Wear/On Stage Question: Katie Schreckengast (2014)
- Non-finalist Interview: Katie Schreckengast (2014)
- Non-finalist Talent: Tawni Darby (2007), Samantha Renck (2016)

==== Other awards ====
- Miss Congeniality/Spirit of America: Julia Rae Schlucter (2009)
- America's Choice: Alysa Bainbridge (2017)
- Children's Miracle Network (CMN) Miracle Maker Award: Page Mackenzie Weinstein (2015), Alysa Bainbridge (2017)
- Community Service Award: Katie Schreckengast (2014)
- Outstanding Achievement in Academic Life: Kaitlynne Kline (2012)
- Outstanding Dance Award: Samantha Renck (2016)
- Overall Vocal Talent: Cecilia Petrush (2019)
- Teens in Action Award 2nd Runner-up: Jersey Gianna Smith (2023)
- Teens in Action Award Finalists: Samantha Renck (2016), Madison Dompkosky (2018), Jaylen Baron (2022), Anna Rinnier (2027)
- Top Advertisement Sales Media Scholarship: Page Weinstein (2015), Madison Dompkosky (2018), Cecilia Petrush (2019)
- Overall Interview Award: Jaylen Baron (2021)

== Winners ==
- Declared as winner
- Ended as a runner-up
- Ended as a finalist or semi-finalist

Year	Name	Hometown	Age	Local title	Talent	Placement at MAO Teen	Special scholarships at MAO Teen	Notes
2026	Anna Rinnier	Bryn Mawr	16	Miss Northeastern Pennsylvania’s Teen	Tap Dance		Teens in Action Award Finalist	
2025	Lynzi Allen	Perkasie	17	Miss Philadelphia's Teen	Jazz Dance	Top 11	Preliminary Evening Gown	
2024	Arianna Spurlin	Dallas	17	Miss Wilkes-Barre/Scranton’s Teen	Tap Dance			
2023	Lizzie Shacklett	Radnor	15	Miss Wilkes-Barre/Scranton’s Teen	Irish Step Dance			
2022	Jersey Gianna Smith	Carmichaels	16	Miss York County's Outstanding Teen	Lyrical Acrobatic Dance		Teens in Action 2nd runner-up	
2021	Jaylen Baron	Eagleville	19	Miss Greater Reading's Outstanding Teen	Musical Theater Dance	Top 11	Teens in Action Finalist Top Interview Award (tie)	
2019-20	Riley Evans	Pittsburgh	16	Miss Moraine State's Outstanding Teen	Acrobatic Jazz Dance, "The Greatest Show" from The Greatest Showman	Top 10	Preliminary Talent Award	
2018	Cecilia Petrush	Murrysville	17	Miss Laurel Highlands' Outstanding Teen	Vocal, "Don't Rain on My Parade" from Funny Girl	1st runner-up	Overall Vocal Talent Award Preliminary Talent Award Top Advertisement Sales Media Scholarship	Later Miss Washtenaw County 2022
2017	Madison Dompkosky	Mountain Top	15	Miss Wilkes-Barre/Scranton's Outstanding Teen	Tap Dance, "Don't Stop Till You Get Enough"		Top Advertisement Sales Media Scholarship	
2016	Alysa Bainbridge	Leesport	17	Miss State Capitol's Outstanding Teen	Lyrical Dance	Top 11	CMN Miracle Maker Award America's Choice Award	Later Miss Delaware USA 2024 and Miss Pennsylvania 2022
2015	Samantha Renck	Newtown	17	Miss Philadelphia's Outstanding Teen	Lyrical Dance		Non-finalist Talent Award Outstanding Dance Award Teens in Action Award Finalist	
2014	Page Mackenzie Weinstein	Pittsburgh	16	Miss Laurel Highlands' Outstanding Teen	Dance Twirl Routine, "Wings" by L'il Mix	Top 8	CMN Miracle Maker Award	Later Miss Pennsylvania 2024
2013	Katie Schreckengast	Palmyra	16	Miss Luzerne County's Outstanding Teen	Alto Saxophone		Community Service Award Non-finalist Evening Wear/OSQ Award Non-finalist Interview Award	Later Miss Pennsylvania 2017; Top 10 at Miss America 2018 pageant
2012	Kaitlyn Miller	Plymouth	17	Miss MidState's Outstanding Teen	Tap Dance			
2011	Kaitlynne Kline	Cochranton	17	Miss Laurel Highland's Outstanding Teen	Vocal		Outstanding Achievement in Academic Life Award	
2010	Jocelyn Gruber	Grove City	17	Miss Greater Johnstown's Outstanding Teen	Piano, "Hungary Rapsodie Mignonne Op. 410" by Carl Kölling	Top 10		2nd runner-up at Miss Pennsylvania 2014 pageant
2009	Jill Wiley	Washington Boro	16	Miss Central Pennsylvania's Outstanding Teen	Broadway Vocal			Cast in the national touring company of Beauty and the Beast Cast as Maria Rainer in national tour of The Sound of Music
2008	Julia Rae Schlucter	Malvern	16	At-Large	Broadway Vocal	1st runner-up	Spirit of America Award	Diagnosed with cystic fibrosis at birth 1st runner-up at Miss Pennsylvania 2015 pageant
2007	Elena LaQuatra	Mount Lebanon	15	Miss Central Pennsylvania's Outstanding Teen	Tap Dance, "You Can't Stop the Beat" from Hairspray	2nd runner-up	Preliminary Evening Wear/OSQ Award	Deaf since age 4 due to bacterial meningitis Later Miss Pennsylvania Teen USA 2010 Later Miss Pennsylvania USA 2016
2006	Tawni Darby	Hermitage	15	Miss Moraine State's Outstanding Teen	Lyrical Dance		Non-finalist Talent Award	Founder and director of the Teens in Training camp program for Miss America's Outstanding Teen contestants
2005	Annie Rosellini	Butler	13	At-Large	Lyrical Dance			Later Miss Pennsylvania 2013
