= Tina Louise Thomas =

American model and beauty contestant

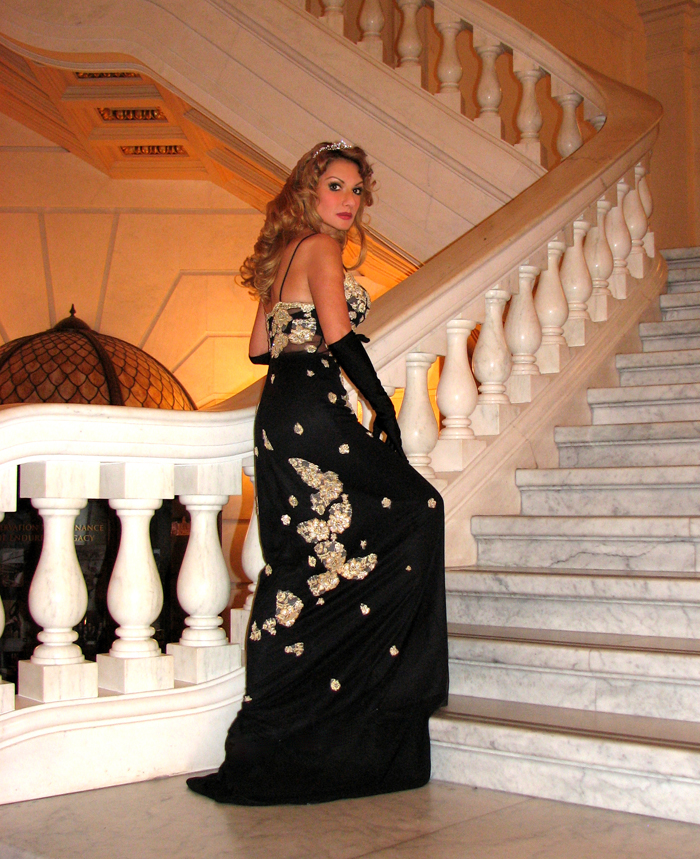
- Thomas at Capitol Rotunda 2007
- Born: Tina Louise Thomas; March 11, 1955 (age 71)
- Education: J. P. McCaskey High School
- Height: 5 ft 7 in (1.70 m)
- Beauty pageant titleholder
- Title: Miss Pennsylvania 1973
- Hair color: Chestnut Brown
- Eye color: Chestnut
- Major competitions: Miss America 1974 (runner-up, preliminary talent award winner)

Tina Louise Thomas, "Take My Hand, Precious Lord"
A 30-second sample of "Take My Hand, Precious Lord" by Tina Louise Thomas.

Tina Louise Thomas is a former Miss Pennsylvania (1973) and Miss America scholarship pageant national talent winner and 4th runner-up (1974), as well as being a musician and writer. Thomas was baptized Christina Hatzithomas in her father's Greek Orthodox church. (Hatzi is a preface to a family name given to descendants of ancestors baptized in the River Jordan).

== Pageant contestant ==
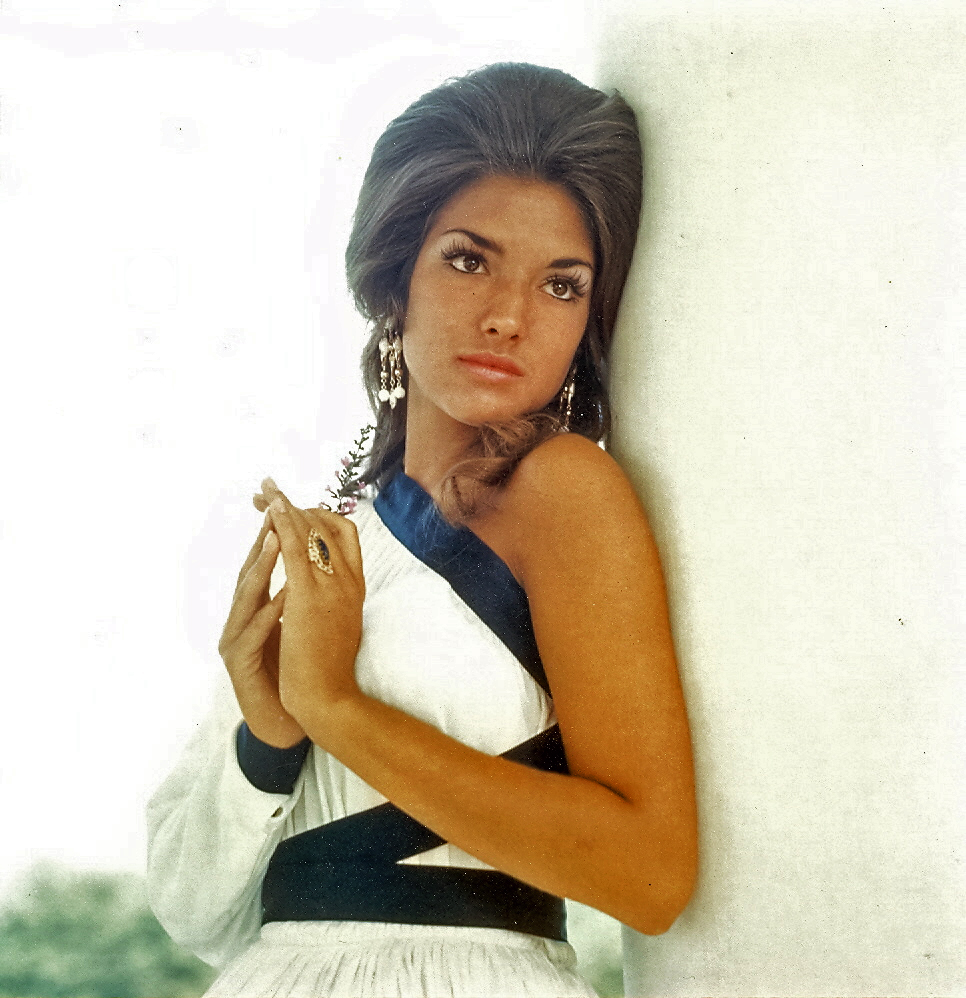
Tina at the Hershey Hotel, PA, 1973

On June 25, 1973, shortly after winning the state's pageant title, Thomas was invited to speak to the Pennsylvania House of Representatives about her platform issues and she was, subsequently, honored by them with a Citation, commending her talent, beauty and academic achievements. She had earlier received a similar recognition from the Pennsylvania State Senate at the State Capitol Rotunda.

Five days later, on June 30, Thomas was the official ribbon-cutter who opened the now world-famous Hershey's Chocolate World.

Thomas, who was accompanied by the Glenn Osser Orchestra, won a Preliminary Talent Award at the 47th Miss America pageant, held at Boardwalk Hall in Atlantic City, New Jersey, which was presented by Terry Meeuwsen, Miss America 1973, as well as at every pageant she entered on her journey to Atlantic City. Additionally, Thomas won the swimsuit competition in each of her local and state contests.

Thomas's winning performance featured her rendition of "Take My Hand, Precious Lord", written in 1932 by Rev. Thomas A. Dorsey and arranged by Paul Mann, to a standing ovation. Rev. Dorsey, the "father of black gospel music," went on to write an article in Christian Life magazine "Jesus Took My Hand" (describing the experiences he went through prior to writing the song) where he mentioned her. He wrote, "And, it was the song that helped Tina Thomas, Miss Pennsylvania, win the Miss America talent competition."

Early in her pageant days Thomas was sought after to assist in raising awareness and funds for various causes, including disadvantaged youth and retarded children, multiple sclerosis, the Salvation Army, Teen Challenge, the American Heart Association, the Arthritis Fund, and Easter Seals, where she appeared on telethons, radio and television shows and commercials, performed at concerts on their behalf, as well as led and participated in activities such as Bike Hikes.

Throughout Thomas's pageant years, leading up to and including her run at Miss America, where she competed as the youngest contestant that year at the age of 18, her primary platform was against substance abuse. Her many actions were recognized when she became the recipient of the Red Rose City Outstanding Citizen Award on September 25, 1973 and was made an International Honorary Member of Beta Sigma Phi.

The August 1974 issue of Christian Life magazine carried Thomas' personal written testimony under the banner heading "Beauty for the Lord," which was re-printed in May 1975 by Greek Youth Magazine for distribution in the U.S. and in Greece.

== Performances ==
Between 1972 and 1979, Thomas shared the concert stage, many of which were televised, with an array of people and groups, several of whom were Grammy and Dove award winners. Among them were: the Oak Ridge Boys, Roy Rogers, Bill Gaither Trio, The Happy Goodman Family, Dottie Rambo, Reba Rambo, Speer Family, The Cathedrals, the Kingsmen Quartet, Blackwood Brothers, Larry Ferrari, the Jacobs Brothers, the Blue Ridge Quartet and the Couriers. At many of the concerts Tina was accompanied on the piano by William D. (Bill) Crabtree.

There were several concerts where Thomas either opened for or sang with author and singer Dale Evans Rogers. The first was a televised concert on November 17, 1972. Two other engagements were opening for Ms. Evans August 7 and 8, 1973 in Chautauqua, New York, when Thomas was accompanied by multi-award-winning jazz pianist George Shearing, and at the historic Ocean Grove, NJ Great Auditorium and Casino Asbury Park, for the 50th Annual Convention of the National Federation of Men's Bible Classes weekend concert series, June 21–23, 1974.

In July 1973, shortly after winning the Miss Pennsylvania crown, Thomas was invited by the then-Pennsylvania Secretary of State, C. Delores Tucker, (the first African-American Secretary of State in the U.S.) to sing at the State Museum of Pennsylvania, Harrisburg, where Governor Milton J. Shapp presented her with a Gubernatorial Commendation. Two months later Thomas appeared with Shapp and Tucker as a speaker and soloist for a civil rights event in Philadelphia, Pennsylvania. She also performed at the Pennsylvania Governor's Bi-Centennial Commonwealth Prayer Breakfast on November 16, 1976.

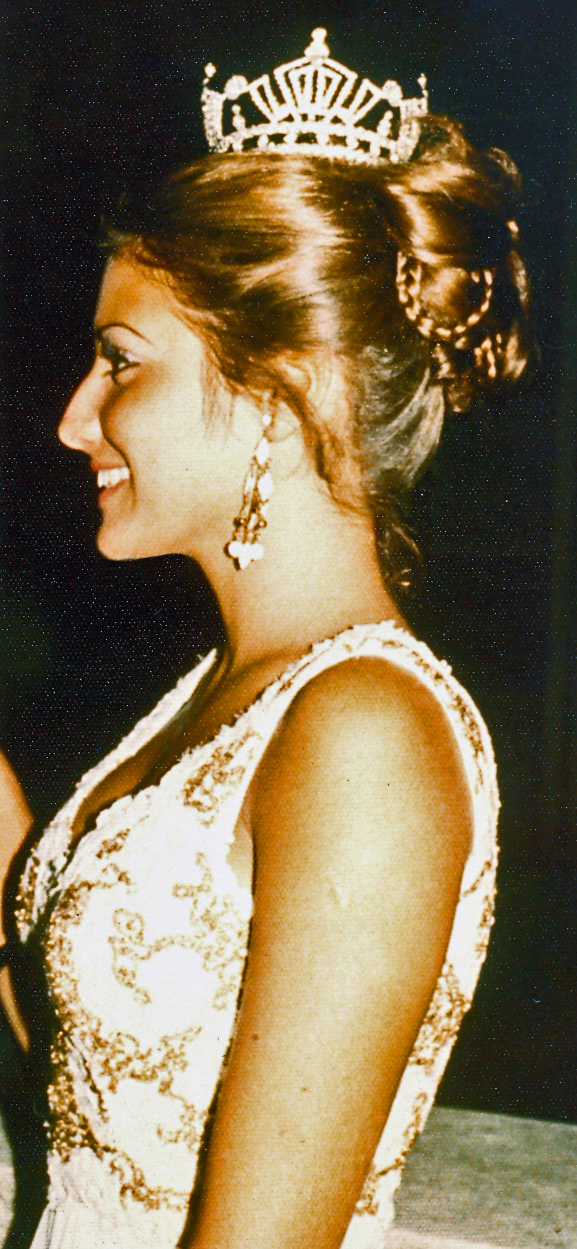
Tina, Hershey Theater, 1974

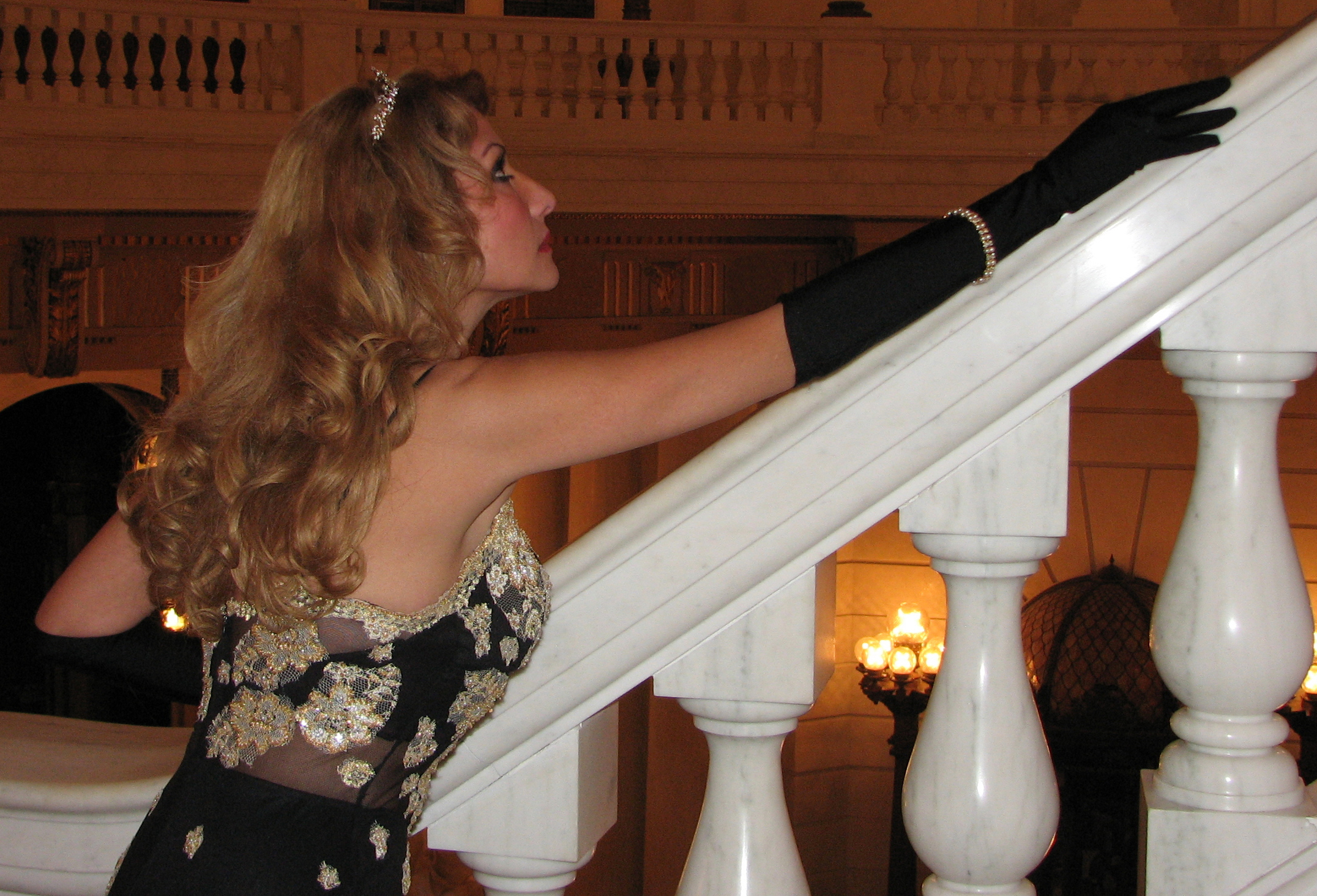
Tina, Harrisburg Rotunda, 2007

Prior to the 1975 Greater Mississippi Billy Graham Crusade held at Veteran's Memorial Stadium in Jackson, Mississippi, Thomas performed and gave personal Testimony for the Crusade members.

Thomas made two singing appearances on Christian Broadcasting Network's The 700 Club. On her first engagement, August 3, 1977, she sang My Tribute, by Andrae Crouch and was interviewed by Dr. Pat Robertson and on her second engagement, September 27, 1978, she performed several songs from her album, Servant.

During December 1978, at the Fulton Opera House, Thomas starred as the leading lady where she sang and danced in the tribute performance "The Rodgers and Hart Production" with Metropolitan Opera star John Darrenkamp. The final performance of the show was held New Year's Eve.

== Years following ==
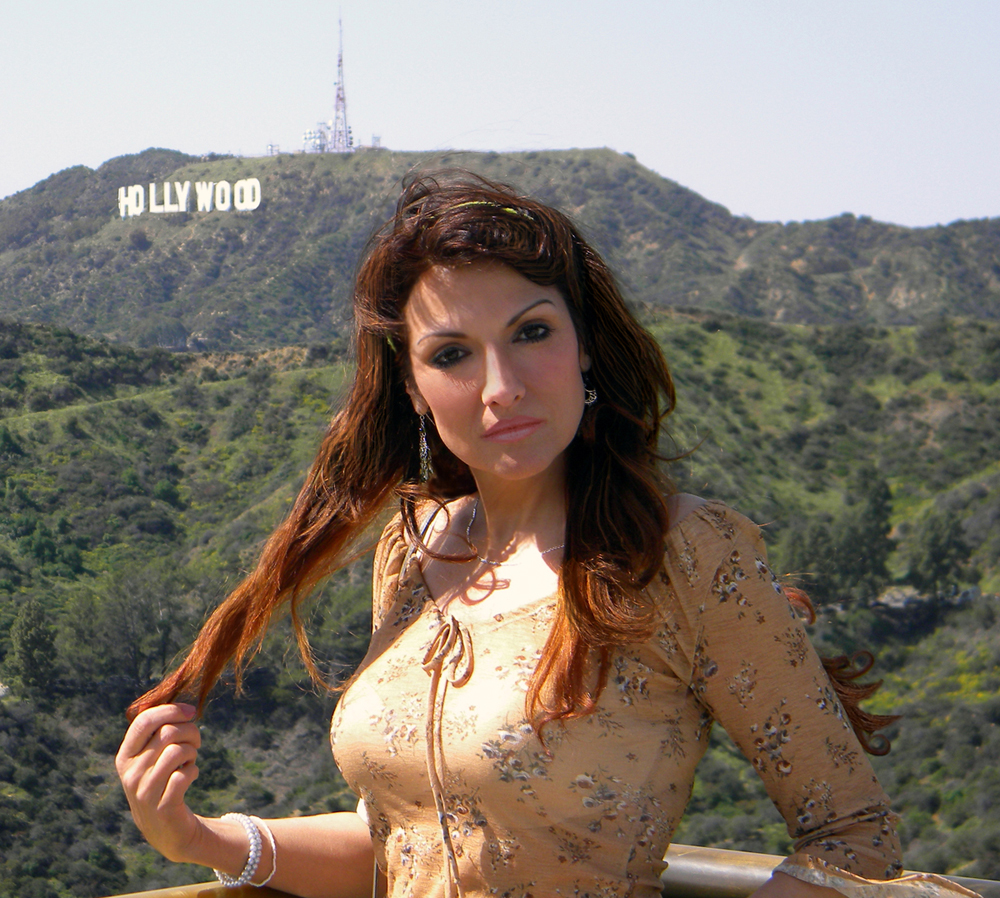
Thomas, Griffith Park Observatory, California, 2010

Thomas. a soprano, recorded a sacred music album at Superior Sound Studios in 1976, Servant, produced by Wayne Hilton and engineered by Fred Cameron. Her booking agent, at the time, was Russell Kruse, founder of Kruse International.

Although Thomas declined offers to pursue a singing career following the release of Servant, deciding, instead, to raise a family, she provided individual vocal lessons and coaching stage performers to aspiring singers and musicians.

Along with working out and a healthy lifestyle, Thomas enjoys dancing, playing piano, writing poetry, art, and astronomy. Thomas has also expressed interest in the outdoors, becoming both a certified sailor and a certified scuba diver. Her sons, Austin and Aaron, are, as well, performers and athletic.

As a member of the Main Street Acting Company, Thomas assisted in the production and choreography and performed in a televised presentation of The Easter Story, held on Good Friday, April 17, 1992. She also became certified to counsel at a domestic violence center and is both a certified classroom tutor and supervisor, working with at-risk elementary school students and alternative education middle and high school students in a remedial reading program.

Since 1994 she has been a judge in the annual Miss Optimist competition, judging the essays and oral presentations of the contestants. Additionally, she was a contributing writer, and also served as a co-editor, for Wing Beat magazine, devoted to the ancient sport of falconry, from December 1994 to December 1996. Aside from sacred music, Thomas has been an avid fan and writer of jazz and blues music since her youth.

== Servant ==
Servant

Studio album by Tina Louise Thomas
- Released: Nov 17, 1976
- Recorded: Superior Sound Studios; Hendersonville, TN
- Genre: Sacred
- Label: Superior
- Producer: Wayne Hilton

=== Track listing ===
1. Servant (Eileen)
2. Sing/Simple Song (Joe Raposo) (Honeytree)
3. Flesh Of My Flesh (Randy Matthews)
4. He Is God (Lindstrom)
5. Take My Hand, Precious Lord (Thomas A. Dorsey)
6. I Am Your Servant (Larry Norman)
7. Amazing Grace (Words: John Newton / Music: Samuel Stanley)
8. Drinkin' (Honeytree)
9. Ave Maria (Charles B. Marks)
10. The Lord's Prayer (Albert Hay Malotte)

=== Production ===
- Produced By Wayne Hilton
- Recorded at Superior Sound Studios, Hendersonville, Tennessee
- Engineer & Remix: Fred Cameron
- Art, Design and Layout: Fred Satterfield

=== Personnel ===
- Keyboards: BeeGee Cruser Adair
- Bass: James "Duke" Dumas
- Drums: Fred Satterfield
- Acoustic Guitar: Wayne Hilton
- Percussion: Farrell Morris
- Harp: Cindy Reynolds
- Brass and string arrangements: Roger Bissell
- Backing Vocal: Tina Louise Thomas

Honorary titles
Preceded by Linda Olson	Miss Pennsylvania; 1973	Succeeded by Karen Lynn Kuhn
