= Miss America 1940 =

14th Miss America pageant

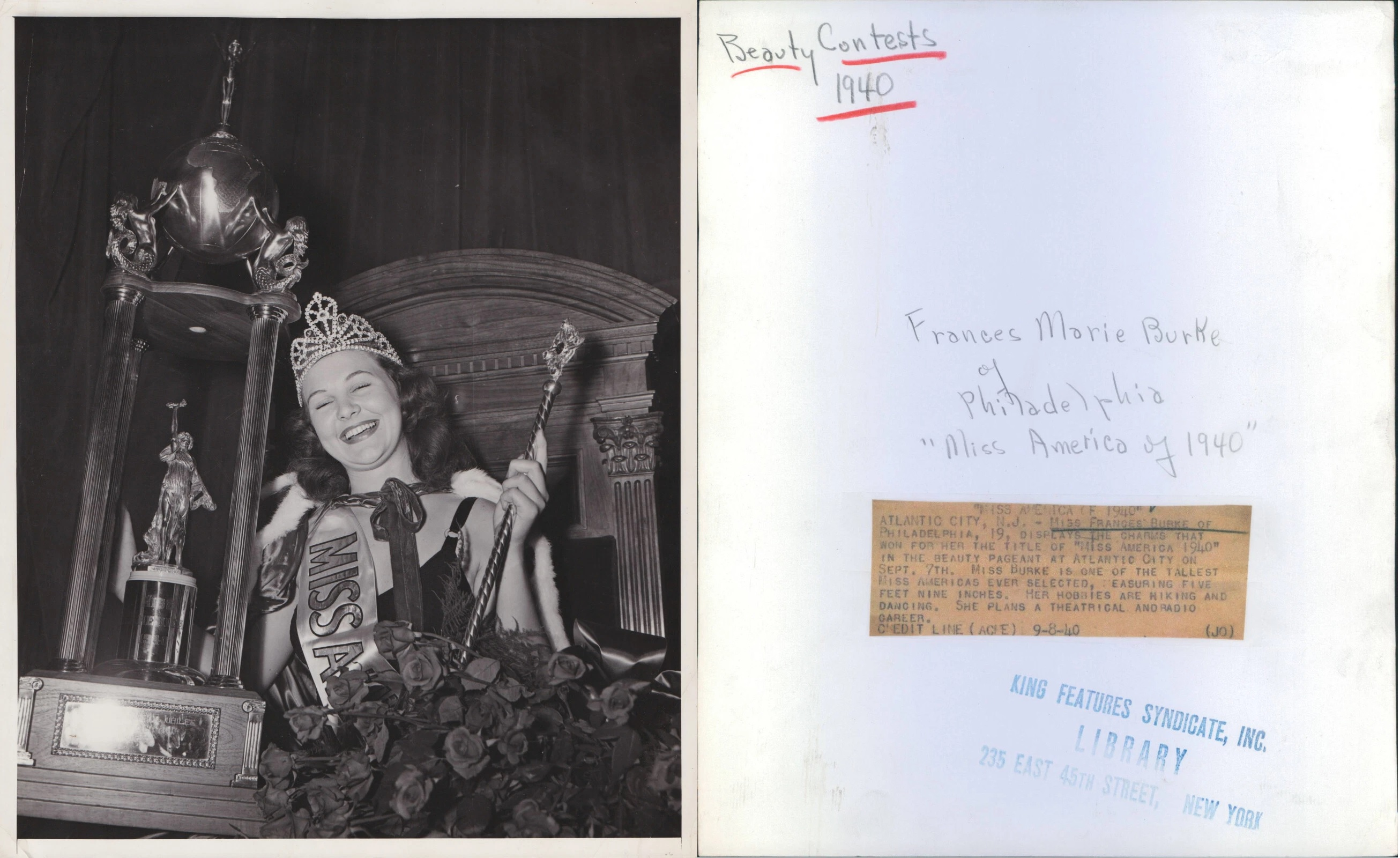
- Date: September 7, 1940
- Presenters: Bob Russell
- Venue: Boardwalk Hall, Atlantic City, New Jersey, U.S.
- Entrants: 44
- Placements: 15
- Winner: Frances Marie Burke; Philadelphia

Miss America 1940, the 14th Miss America pageant, was held at the Boardwalk Hall in Atlantic City, New Jersey for the first time since 1933. The finals were held on September 7, 1940. Aside from the winner, Frances Burke, Miss Philadelphia, two other contestants from Pennsylvania placed among the Top 15, one representing Eastern Pennsylvania and the other from Western Pennsylvania.

The runner-up, Rosemary LaPlanche, would become Miss America 1941, before the pageant instituted rules preventing contestants from competing more than once.

== Results ==
=== Placements ===
Placement	Contestant
Miss America 1940	Philadelphia – Frances Marie Burke
1st Runner-Up	California – Rosemary LaPlanche
2nd Runner-Up	Michigan – Monnie Drake
3rd Runner-Up	Massachusetts – Polly Connors
4th Runner-Up	Kentucky – Dorothy Slatten
Top 15	Delaware – Peggy E. Insolo; District of Columbia – Catherine Virginia Howe; Eastern Pennsylvania – Mildred Irene Saha; Huntington – Juanita Park Wright; Miami – Mitzi Strother; Missouri – Virginia Morrison; Montana – Kay Kittendorff; Myrtle Beach – LaBruce Sherill; Oklahoma – Ada Martyne Wood; Western Pennsylvania – Alberta Louise Carts

=== Awards ===
==== Preliminary awards ====
Award	Contestant
Lifestyle and Fitness	California – Rosemary LaPlanche; Kentucky – Dorothy Slatten; Philadelphia – Frances Marie Burke
Talent	District of Columbia – Catherine Virginia Howe; Michigan – Monnie Drake (tie); Montana – Kay Kittendorff (tie); Myrtle Beach – LaBruce Sherill

== Contestants ==
Title	Name	Hometown	Age	Talent	Placement	Awards	Notes
Arizona	Anna Marie Barnett	Bisbee					
Arkansas	Betty Benson	Forrest City					
Birmingham	Evelyn Motlow	Birmingham		Vocal			
California	Rosemary LaPlanche	Los Angeles	17	Dance	1st Runner-up	Preliminary Lifestyle & Fitness	
Central Ohio	Bette Jane Hart						
Colorado	Eileen Hoskins	Denver					
Connecticut	Dorothy Pickard	New Haven					
Delaware	Peggy Insolo	Wilmington		Piano	Top 15		
Delaware County	Dorothy A. Wall	Lansdowne					
(Washington, D.C.) District of Columbia	Catherine Howe		22	Dance, "The Yam"	Top 15	Preliminary Talent Award	
Eastern New York	Geraldine Anne Racine						
Eastern Pennsylvania	Mildred Saha	Secane			Top 15		
Huntington	Juanita Park Wright	Huntington			Top 15		
Indiana	Carolyn Akin	Evansville		Tap Dance			
Kansas City	Gloria Kathleen Gipson	Kansas City					
Kentucky	Dorothy Slatten	Lexington			4th Runner-up	Preliminary Lifestyle & Fitness	
Knoxville	Thelma McGhee	Knoxville					
Maine	Shirlie Edith Houston	Augusta					
Maryland	Marie Beiser	Baltimore					
Massachusetts	Polly Connors	Bedford			3rd Runner-up		
Miami	Mitzie Strother	Miami			Top 15		
Michigan	Monnie Drake	Detroit		Vocal, "Bill"	2nd Runner-up	Preliminary Talent Award	
Minnesota	Virginia Kepler	Minneapolis					
Mississippi	Carolyn Simon	Greenville					
Missouri	Virginia Morrison	St. Louis			Top 15		
Montana	Kay Kittendorf	Missoula		Classical Vocal, "Un bel dì, vedremo" from Madama Butterfly	Top 15	Preliminary Talent Award	
Montgomery	Carolyn Foreman	Montgomery					
Myrtle Beach	LaBruce Sherill	Myrtle Beach		Tap Dance, "Cocktails for Two"	Top 15	Preliminary Talent Award	
New Jersey	Mildred Marie Selko	Kearny					
New Orleans	Pauline Powell	New Orleans					
North Carolina	Jeanne Wofford	Forest City					
Ohio	Violet Berze	Steubenville					
Oklahoma	Ada Martyne Wood	Oklahoma City			Top 15		
Philadelphia	Frances Marie Burke	Philadelphia		Vocal/Dance, "I Can't Love You Anymore"	Winner		
South Carolina	Vanadora Baker	Dillon		Recitation			
St. Louis	LeFern Mueller	St. Louis					
Tennessee	Christine Webb	Centerville		Dramatic Monologue, "The Waltz"			
Texas	Gloria Ann Byrns	Port Arthur		Tap Dance & Baton Twirling			
Virginia	Virginia Campbell	Charlottesville					
(Washington (state)) Washington	Peggy Mason	Tacoma					
West Virginia	Mary Schlarmann Bowles	Montgomery					
Westchester County	Constantine Gray	Yonkers					
Western Kentucky	Violet Owen						
Western New York	Gloria Elizabeth Sheehan	Buffalo					
Western Pennsylvania	Alberta Louise Carts	Pittsburgh			Top 15		
