= Miss Pennsylvania =

American beauty pageant competition

- Formation: 1921
- Type: Beauty pageant
- Headquarters: York
- Location: Pennsylvania
- Members: Miss America
- Official language: English
- Website: misspa.org

The Miss Pennsylvania competition is the pageant that selects the representative for the state of Pennsylvania in the Miss America pageant. Pennsylvania, including early years' city representatives, has won the Miss America crown on five occasions.

Originally held in Hershey, the pageant moved to West Chester where pageants were held during the 1950s. The pageant was held in Altoona from 1974. In 1994, Easton was chosen as the new venue of the pageant and the date was shifted from June to May. In November 2008, the pageant was moved to the Pittsburgh area. In 2019, the competition moved to York, Pennsylvania.

In the fall of 2018, the Miss America Organization terminated the Miss Pennsylvania organization's license as well as licenses from Florida, Georgia, New Jersey, New York, Tennessee, and West Virginia.

Stephanie Skinner of Philadelphia was crowned Miss Pennsylvania 2026 on June 20, 2026, at The Appell Center for Performing Arts in York. She competed for the title of Miss America 2027 on September 6, 2026, at the Kravis Center for the Performing Arts in West Palm Beach, Florida.

== Gallery of past titleholders ==
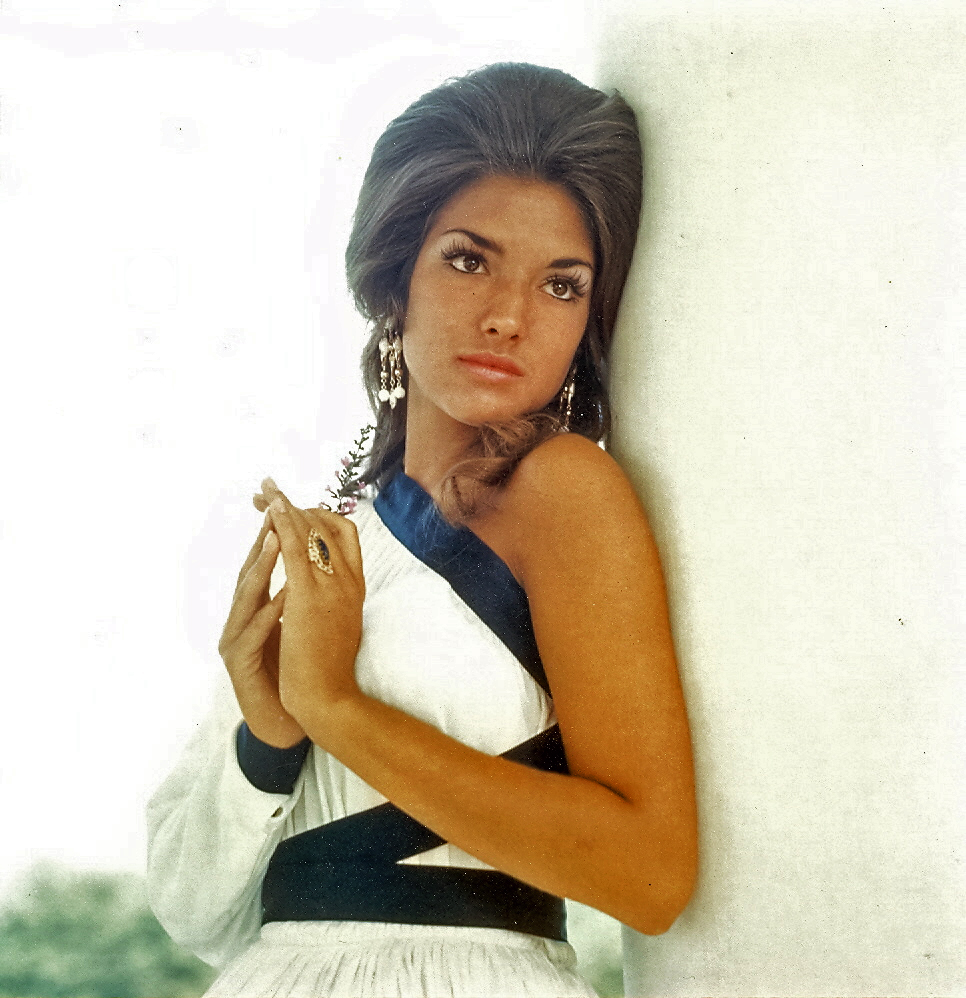
Tina Louise Thomas,
Miss Pennsylvania 1973

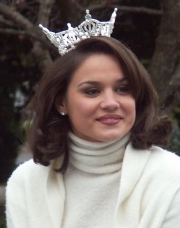
Nicole Brewer,
Miss Pennsylvania 2005

== Results summary ==
The following is a visual summary of the past results of Miss Pennsylvania titleholders at the national Miss America pageants/competitions. The year in parentheses indicates the year of the national competition during which a placement and/or award was garnered, not the year attached to the contestant's state title.

=== Placements ===
- Miss Americas: Ruth Malcomson (1924), Henrietta Leaver (1935), Rose Coyle (1936), Frances Marie Burke (1940), Evelyn Ay (1954)
- 1st runners-up: Rosella Hannon (1941)
- 2nd runners-up: Linda Olson (1973), Susan Spafford (2000)
- 3rd runners-up: Barbara Sue Nager (1955), Maureen Wimmer (1972)
- 4th runners-up: Marion Green (1923), Maggie Walker (1971), Tina Louise Thomas (1974)
- Top 4: Gladys Greenamyer (1922)
- Top 5: Kathleen Coyle (1927)
- Top 10: Dorothea Ditmer (1927), Emma Hammermeister (1943), Patricia Hunt (1953), Lois Janet Piercy (1960), Marie McLaughlin (1977), Lynn Carol Grote (1978), Carolyn Louise Black (1980), Michelle Kline (1990), Marla Wynne (1991), Melissa Jeka (2001), Nicole Brewer (2006), Emily Wills (2007), Katie Schreckengast (2018)
- Top 12: Lenore Pollock (1935), Jean McCool (1935), Helen Keaser (1935), Margie Dorie (1944)
- Top 13: Gloria Bair (1945)
- Top 15: Mildred Walker (1925), Anna Mae Reefer (1926), Anna Julia Zaker (1936), Bonnie Boyle (1936), Elaine Miller (1936), Kathryn “Kay” Buckley (1938), Alberta Louise Carts (1940), Mildred Saha (1940), Lillian Handford (1947)
- Top 16: Eleanor Kramer (1946), Janice Murray (1951)
- Top 18: Geraldine Glassman (1933)
- Top 20: Rosalyn Menon (2002)

=== Awards ===
==== Preliminary awards ====
- Preliminary Lifestyle and Fitness: Evelyn Ay (1954), Emily Wills (2007)
- Preliminary Presentation: Rosalyn Menon (2002)
- Preliminary Talent: Rose Coyle (1936), Rosella Hannon (1941), Eleanor Kramer (1946), Jennie Blatchford (1958), Lois Janet Piercy (1960), Maureen Wimmer (1972), Tina Louise Thomas (1974), Lynn Carol Grote (1978), Amanda Smith (2015), Page Weinstein (2024)

==== Non-finalist awards ====
- Non-finalist Talent: Lorna Malcomson Ringler (1957), Judith McConnell (1966), Gale Veronica Rothwell (1967), Connie Harness (1976), Lea Schiazza (1986), Linda O'Boyle (1992), Candace Otto (2004), Rachel Brooks (2008), Kendria Perry (2009), Amanda Smith (2015)

==== Other awards ====
- Miss Congeniality: N/A
- Amateur Beauty Award: Gladys Greenamyer (1922)
- Bernie Wayne Performing Arts Award: Candace Otto (2004)
- Cavalier Scholarship: Katarina Sitaris (1988)
- Community Achievement Award: Rosalyn Menon (2002)
- Dr. David B. Allman Medical Scholarship: Charmaine Kowalski (1979), Shannon Doyle (2010)
- Equity and Justice Award Finalist: Meghan Sinisi (2022)
- Quality of Life Award Winners: Michelle Kline (1990)
- Quality of Life Award 2nd runners-up: Marla Wynne (1991)
- Roller Chair Parade (Intercity) Second Prize: Leah M. Knapp (1922)
- Roller Chair Parade Third Prize: Marion Green (1923)
- Women in Business Scholarship Award: Meghan Sinisi (2022)
- Quality of Life Award Finalist: Stephanie Skinner (2027)

== Winners ==
- Declared as winner
- Ended as a runner-up
- Ended as a finalist or semi-finalist

Year	Name	Hometown	Age	Local Title	Miss America Talent	Placement at Miss America	Special scholarships at Miss America	Notes
2026	Stephanie Skinner	Philadelphia	21	Miss Philadelphia	Tap Dance		Quality of Award Life Finalist	Previously Miss New York Teen USA 2023; 1st runner-up at Miss Teen USA 2023; Previously Miss High School America 2021
2025	Victoria Vespico	Shavertown	25	Miss Northeastern PA	Tap Dance			
2024	Page Weinstein	Pittsburgh	26	Miss Greater Pittsburgh	Dance Twirl, "Thunderstruck"		Preliminary Talent Award	Previously Miss Pennsylvania's Outstanding Teen 2014 and a Top 8 finalist at Miss America's Teen 2015
2023	Miranda Moore	Harrisburg	24	Miss Central Pennsylvania	Clarinet			
2022	Alysa Bainbridge	Leesport	23	Miss Greater Reading	Lyrical Dance			Previously Miss Pennsylvania's Outstanding Teen 2016; Later Miss Delaware USA 2024
2021	Meghan Sinisi	Altoona	25	Miss Central Pennsylvania	Baton Twirling		Equity and Justice Award Finalist Women in Business Award	
2019–20	Tiffany Seitz	Freeport	23	Miss Laurelwood	Dance			
2018	Kayla Repasky	Gettysburg	22	Miss Greater Carlisle	Contemporary Dance, "Every Breath You Take"			
2017	Katie Schreckengast	Palmyra	20	Miss Central Pennsylvania	Alto Saxophone, "Listen" from Dreamgirls	Top 10		Previously Miss Pennsylvania's Outstanding Teen 2013
2016	Samantha Lambert	Pittsburgh	22	Miss Laurelwood	Acrobatic Dance, "Game of Shadows"			
2015	Ashley Schmider	South Fayette	23	Miss Neshaminy Valley	Tap Dance, "Feel This Moment"			Contestant at National Sweetheart 2012 pageant
2014	Amanda Smith	Dade City, FL	21	Miss Southwestern Pennsylvania	Vocal, "Wishing You Were Somehow Here Again" from The Phantom of the Opera		Non-finalist Talent Award Preliminary Talent Award	
2013	Annie Rosellini	Butler	21	Miss Greater Juniata Valley	Lyrical Dance, "Let It Be"			Previously Miss Pennsylvania's Outstanding Teen 2005
2012	Jordyn Colao	Erie	22	Miss Freedom Forge	Tap Dance, "Whatever Lola Wants" from Damn Yankees			
2011	Juliann Sheldon	Plum	21	Miss Jewel of the West	Lyrical Dance, "I Believe"			Former NFL cheerleader for the Carolina Panthers
2010	Courtney Thomas	Sigel	21	Miss Jewel of the West	Fiddle, "Orange Blossom Special"			Top 10 at National Sweetheart 2009 pageant
2009	Shannon Doyle	Wilkes-Barre	24	Miss Armstrong County	Tap Dance, "A Little Polish"		Dr. David B. Allman Medical Scholarship	
2008	Kendria Perry	Nazareth	23	Miss Armstrong County	Piano, "Ballade No. 1" by Chopin		Non-finalist Talent Award	
2007	Rachel Brooks	Broomall	24	Miss River City	Vocal, "Summertime"		Non-finalist Talent Award	
2006	Emily Wills	Beaver	24	Miss Armstrong County	Vocal, "If I Ain't Got You"	Top 10	Preliminary Swimsuit Award	2nd runner-up at National Sweetheart 2005 pageant
2005	Nicole Brewer	Philadelphia	22	Miss Allegheny Valley	Vocal, "The Wizard and I" from Wicked	Top 10		Sister of Miss Maryland 2016, Hannah Brewer
2004	Victoria Bechtold	Johnstown	21	Miss Pittsburgh	Classical Vocal, "Je Veux Vivre" from Roméo et Juliette			
2003	Candace Otto	Murrysville	23	Miss Three Rivers	Classical Vocal, "Non Ti Scordar di Me" by Ernesto De Curtis		Bernie Wayne Performing Arts Award Non-finalist Talent Award	
2002	Autumn Marisa	Waynesburg	22	Miss Armstrong County	Lyrical Dance, "The Bells of St. Paul"			
2001	Rosalyn Menon	Hazleton	22	Miss Three Rivers	Classical Piano, "Piano Sonata in C Minor" by Beethoven	Top 20	Community Achievement Award Preliminary Presentation Award	
2000	Melissa Jeka	Warminster	23	Miss Allegheny Valley	Ballet en Pointe, "The Diamond"	Top 10		
1999	Susan Spafford	Erie	24	Miss Southwestern Pennsylvania	Violin, "Polish Caprice"	2nd runner-up		
1998	Mayra Acosta	Lewistown	22	Miss Southwestern Pennsylvania	Popular Vocal, "To Love You More"			
1997	Heather Busin	Grove City	20	Miss Butler County	Vocal, "I Will Listen"			
1996	GiGi Gordon	Butler	23	Miss Armstrong County	Lyrical Dance, "When a Man Loves a Woman"			
1995	Linette Mertz	Kutztown	23	Miss Susquehanna Valley	Country Vocal, "Why Haven't I Heard from You"			
1994	Kirstin Border	Glen Rock	24	Miss State Capitol	Violin, "Czardas with a Twist of Orange"			
1993	Diane Fabiano	Lansdale	24	Miss Southwestern Pennsylvania	Vocal, "City Lights"			
1992	Judy Fitch	Dallas	24	Miss Wilkes-Barre/Scranton	Vocal, "Sincerely"			
1991	Linda O'Boyle	Dupont	23	Miss Wilkes-Barre/Scranton	Technique Tap Dance, "Hoofin'"		Non-finalist Talent Award	
1990	Marla Wynne	Easton	23	Miss Southwestern Pennsylvania	Ventriloquism, "Together (Wherever We Go)"	Top 10	Quality of Life Award 2nd runner-up	Described by broadcaster Larry King as the "ugliest girl" in the pageant. King later rescinded his remarks Mother, Marlene Wynne, was the executive director of the Miss Pennsylvania pageant until death in June 2008
1989	Michelle Kline	Easton	24	Miss Wilkes-Barre/Scranton	Classical Vocal, "Una Voce Poco Fa" from The Barber of Seville	Top 10	Quality of Life Award	
1988	Denise Meyer	Pittsburgh	21	Miss Bedford	Popular Vocal, "Over the Rainbow"			
1987	Katarina Sitaris	Wilkes-Barre	24	Miss Wilkes-Barre/Scranton	Classical Vocal, "Quando me'n vo'" from La bohème		Cavalier Scholarship	
1986	Darlene Deeley	Philadelphia	25	Miss Greater Wilkes-Barre/Scranton	Gymnastics / Dance Routine			
1985	Lea Schiazza	Philadelphia	23	Miss Montgomery County	Vocal, "Who’s Sorry Now"		Non-finalist Talent Award	
1984	Gina Major	Huntsville	24	Miss Lehigh Valley	Vocal, Judy Garland Medley			
1983	Jennifer Eshelman	Hegins	23	Miss Pocono	Classical Vocal, "Adele's Laughing Song" from Die Fledermaus			
1982	Laurie Ann Hixenbaugh	Belle Vernon	22	Miss Washington County	Baton Twirling, "Pop Goes to the Movies"			
1981	Jill Shaffer	Dover	22	Miss Lebanon	Piano, "Piano Concerto in A Minor" by Grieg			
1980	Anita Ellen Patton	Lebanon	21	Miss Lebanon	Vocal, "If You Believe" from The Wiz			
1979	Carolyn Louise Black	Elizabethtown	22	Miss Lancaster County	Vocal, "All the Things You Are"	Top 10		
1978	Charmaine Kowalski	State College	22	Miss Penn State	Piano, Warsaw Concerto		Dr. David B. Allman Medical Scholarship	
1977	Lynn Carol Grote	Bowmansville	22	Miss Lancaster County	Piano Medley, "I Got Rhythm," "The Man I Love," & Rhapsody in Blue	Top 10	Preliminary Talent Award	
1976	Marie McLaughlin	Levittown	23	Miss Lehigh Valley	Ventriloquism, "Together (Wherever We Go)"	Top 10		
1975	Connie Harness	Mechanicsburg	20	Miss Cumberland Valley	Classical Vocal, "Romance" from The Desert Song		Non-finalist Talent Award	
1974	Karen Lynn Kuhn	Levittown	20	Miss Lower Bucks County	Ballet, "Shubert Alley Overture"			
1973	Tina Louise Thomas	Lancaster	18	Miss Lancaster County	Gospel Vocal, "Take My Hand, Precious Lord"	4th runner-up	Preliminary Talent Award	
1972	Linda Olson	Corry	20	Miss Indiana University of Pennsylvania	Piano, Gershwin Medley	2nd runner-up		
1971	Maureen Wimmer	Perkasie	20	Miss Bucks County	Classical Vocal, "Quando me'n vo'" from La bohème	3rd runner-up	Preliminary Talent Award	
1970	Maggie Walker	Harrisburg	18	Miss York County	Gymnastic Ballet on Uneven Parallel Bars, "Contessa"	4th runner-up		
1969	Trudy Lee Pedersen	Etters	18	Miss York County	Vocal, "The Sound of Music"			
1968	Susan Robinson	Pittsburgh	22	Miss Pittsburgh	Comedy Monologue, "Sis Hopkins"			
1967	Doris Ann Lausch	Lancaster	20	Miss Lancaster County	Vocal, "Love In a Home" from Li'l Abner			
1966	Gale Veronica Rothwell	Philadelphia	21	Miss Germantown	Classical Vocal, "Quando me'n vo'" from La bohème		Non-finalist Talent Award	
1965	Judith Lynn McConnell	Pittsburgh	21	Miss Pittsburgh	Dramatic Reading from Saint Joan		Non-finalist Talent Award	Best known for her role in the soap opera, Santa Barbara
1964	Marilyn Cutaiar March	Havertown	19	Miss Delaware County	Toe Dance Ballet, "Dance of the Painted Doll"			
1963	Cheryl Lynn Kegley	Salisbury		Miss Central Pennsylvania	Classical Ballet, "Ritual Fire Dance"			Replaced Donna Loar who relinquished her title after two months due to her having mononucleosis
1962	Crystale Leigh Martin	Milton	19	Miss Susquehanna Valley	Dramatic Presentation with self-accompaniment on harp, "The Mad Scene" from Hamlet			
1961	E. Lynne Maloney	King of Prussia	20	Miss Montgomery County	Charcoal Drawing Display & Pantomime Routine			
1960	Priscilla Mae Hendricks	Shillington	19	Miss Reading	Original Display of Art Work			
1959	Lois Janet Piercy	Springfield	21	Miss Centre County	Original Flute & Art Display, "Night Rain on the City"	Top 10	Preliminary Talent Award	
1958	Rosalie Samley	Bethlehem		Miss Lehigh Valley	Ballet, "I Won't Dance"			
1957	Jennie Rebecca Blatchford	Hollidaysburg		Miss Central Pennsylvania	Baton Twirling, "St. Louis Blues" & "The Stars and Stripes Forever"		Preliminary Talent Award	
1956	Lorna Malcomson Ringler	Upper Darby		Miss Delaware County	Vocal		Non-finalist Talent Award	Niece of Miss America 1924, Ruth Malcomson, and mother of Miss Delaware 1981, Jodi Meade Graham
1955	Pam Ulrich	Sinking Spring		Miss Reading	Drama, "Proper Recitation"			
1954	Barbara Sue Nager	Philadelphia		Miss Greater Philadelphia	Egyptian Ballet Dance, "Egyptian Suite"	3rd runner-up		
1953	Evelyn Margaret Ay	Ephrata	20	Miss Lancaster County	Poetry Recitation, "Footsteps" from Leaves from a Grass-House by Don Blanding	Winner	Preliminary Swimsuit Award	
1952	Patricia Mary Hunt	Norristown	20	Miss Greater Philadelphia	Drama	Top 10		Multiple Pennsylvania representatives Contestants competed under local title at Miss America pageant
1952	Miriam May "Mimi" Smith	McAlisterville	21	Miss Pennsylvania	Pipe Organ, "Tico Tico"			Multiple Pennsylvania representatives Contestants competed under local title at Miss America pageant
1951	Margaret Mary "Peggy" Ramsdale	Clifton Heights	19	Miss Greater Philadelphia	Vocal, "Danny Boy"			Multiple Pennsylvania representatives Contestants competed under local title at Miss America pageant
1951	Clare Marie Lippert	Tarentum	18	Miss Pennsylvania	Vocal, "Lullaby of Broadway"			Multiple Pennsylvania representatives Contestants competed under local title at Miss America pageant
1950	Janice Eileen Murray	Philadelphia	23	Miss Greater Philadelphia	Classical Vocal, "O Don Fatale" from Don Carlos	Top 16		Multiple Pennsylvania representatives Contestants competed under local title at Miss America pageant
1950	Emilie Ann Longacre	Phoenixville	18	Miss Pennsylvania	Vocal, "You're My Everything"			Multiple Pennsylvania representatives Contestants competed under local title at Miss America pageant
1949	Miriam Lapayowker	Philadelphia	21	Miss Greater Philadelphia	Electric Guitar, "I'm in the Mood for Love"			Multiple Pennsylvania representatives Contestants competed under local title at Miss America pageant
1949	Marlene Joan Carozza	Kennett Square	18	Miss Pennsylvania	Piano, Clair de Lune			Multiple Pennsylvania representatives Contestants competed under local title at Miss America pageant
1948	Betty Jane Bruce	Bridgeport	19	Miss Greater Philadelphia	Vocal, "Fool That I Am" & "Mean to Me"			Multiple Pennsylvania representatives Contestants competed under local title at Miss America pageant
1948	Ruth Annette Douglas	Harrisburg	20	Miss Pennsylvania	Vocal Medley, "Let My Song Fill Your Heart" & "Lover"			Multiple Pennsylvania representatives Contestants competed under local title at Miss America pageant
1948	Sarah Jayne Cromwell	Pittsburgh	19	Miss Pittsburgh				Multiple Pennsylvania representatives Contestants competed under local title at Miss America pageant
1947	Kay McClane	Philadelphia		Miss Greater Philadelphia	Vocal, "Sketching"			Multiple Pennsylvania representatives Contestants competed under local title at Miss America pageant
1947	Dorothy Gresh	Williamsport		Miss Pennsylvania	Vocal, "Lover, Come Back to Me"			Multiple Pennsylvania representatives Contestants competed under local title at Miss America pageant
1947	Lillian Handford	Pittsburgh		Miss Pittsburgh	Painting Display	Top 15		Multiple Pennsylvania representatives Contestants competed under local title at Miss America pageant
1946	Virginia Brown	Philadelphia		Miss Greater Philadelphia				Multiple Pennsylvania representatives Contestants competed under local title at Miss America pageant
1946	Eleanor Kramer	Lebanon		Miss Pennsylvania	Vocal, "My Hero" from The Chocolate Soldier	Top 16	Preliminary Talent Award	Multiple Pennsylvania representatives Contestants competed under local title at Miss America pageant
1945	Timmie Weston	Clairton		Miss Pennsylvania				Multiple Pennsylvania representatives Contestants competed under local title at Miss America pageant
1945	Gloria Bair	Philadelphia		Miss Philadelphia	Dance, "Temptation"	Top 13		Multiple Pennsylvania representatives Contestants competed under local title at Miss America pageant
1944	Margie Dorie	Pittsburgh		Miss Pennsylvania	Vocal, "Big Boy Blue"	Top 12		Multiple Pennsylvania representatives Contestants competed under local title at Miss America pageant
1944	Itha Duerrhammer	Philadelphia		Miss Philadelphia	Vocal & Dance			Multiple Pennsylvania representatives Contestants competed under local title at Miss America pageant
1943	Betty Marie Marcus	Kensington		Miss Eastern Pennsylvania				Multiple Pennsylvania representatives Contestants competed under local title at Miss America pageant
1943	June McAdams	Philadelphia		Miss Philadelphia				Multiple Pennsylvania representatives Contestants competed under local title at Miss America pageant
1943	Emma Hammermeister	Pittsburgh		Miss Western Pennsylvania	Dance & Baton Twirling	Top 10		Multiple Pennsylvania representatives Contestants competed under local title at Miss America pageant
1942	Geraldine Powell	Philadelphia		Miss Philadelphia				Multiple Pennsylvania representatives Contestants competed under local title at Miss America pageant
1942	Ruth Elfreda Schmidt	Pittsburgh		Miss Western Pennsylvania				Multiple Pennsylvania representatives Contestants competed under local title at Miss America pageant
1941	Catherine Jane Albert	Coatesville		Miss Eastern Pennsylvania				Multiple Pennsylvania representatives Contestants competed under local title at Miss America pageant
1941	Carrie de Ludo	Philadelphia		Miss Philadelphia				Multiple Pennsylvania representatives Contestants competed under local title at Miss America pageant
1941	Roselle Hannon	Pittsburgh		Miss Western Pennsylvania	Vocal, "Because of You"	1st runner-up	Preliminary Talent Award	Multiple Pennsylvania representatives Contestants competed under local title at Miss America pageant
1940	Dorothy A. Wall	Lansdowne		Miss Delaware County				Multiple Pennsylvania representatives Contestants competed under local title at Miss America pageant
1940	Mildred Saha	Secane		Miss Eastern Pennsylvania		Top 15		Multiple Pennsylvania representatives Contestants competed under local title at Miss America pageant
1940	Frances Marie Burke	Philadelphia		Miss Philadelphia	Vocal / Dance, "I Can't Love You Anymore"	Winner		Multiple Pennsylvania representatives Contestants competed under local title at Miss America pageant
1940	Alberta Louise Carts	Pittsburgh		Miss Western Pennsylvania		Top 15		Multiple Pennsylvania representatives Contestants competed under local title at Miss America pageant
1939	Emma Louise Knoell	Philadelphia		Miss Eastern Pennsylvania				Multiple Pennsylvania representatives Contestants competed under local title at Miss America pageant
1939	Ruth Phyllis Willock	Pittsburgh		Miss Pennsylvania				Multiple Pennsylvania representatives Contestants competed under local title at Miss America pageant
1939	Nancy Lee	Philadelphia		Miss Philadelphia				Multiple Pennsylvania representatives Contestants competed under local title at Miss America pageant
1938	Wilma Kaspar	Rahns		Miss Eastern Pennsylvania				Multiple Pennsylvania representatives Contestants competed under local title at Miss America pageant
1938	Kathryn “Kay" Buckley	Philadelphia		Miss Philadelphia	Swing Vocal	Top 15		Multiple Pennsylvania representatives Contestants competed under local title at Miss America pageant
1938	Ruth Willock	Pittsburgh		Miss Western Pennsylvania				Multiple Pennsylvania representatives Contestants competed under local title at Miss America pageant
1937	Beryl Kober	Chalfont		Miss Eastern Pennsylvania				Multiple Pennsylvania representatives Contestants competed under local title at Miss America pageant
1937	Kathryn Crase	Philadelphia		Miss Philadelphia				Multiple Pennsylvania representatives Contestants competed under local title at Miss America pageant
1937	Kathryn H. Kendrick	Sunnybrook		Miss Sunnybrook				Multiple Pennsylvania representatives Contestants competed under local title at Miss America pageant
1936	Margie Sossong	Scranton		Miss Anthracite				Multiple Pennsylvania representatives Contestants competed under local title at Miss America pageant
1936	Elaine Miller	Chester		Miss Chester		Top 15		Multiple Pennsylvania representatives Contestants competed under local title at Miss America pageant
1936	Ellen McCormick	Lancaster		Miss Lancaster				Multiple Pennsylvania representatives Contestants competed under local title at Miss America pageant
1936	Joan Frankenburg	Miquon		Miss Montgomery County				Multiple Pennsylvania representatives Contestants competed under local title at Miss America pageant
1936	Rose Coyle	Philadelphia		Miss Philadelphia	Vocal / Tap Dance, "I Can't Escape From You" & "Truckin'"	Winner	Preliminary Talent Award	Multiple Pennsylvania representatives Contestants competed under local title at Miss America pageant
1936	Bonnie Boyle	Pittsburgh		Miss Pittsburgh		Top 15		Multiple Pennsylvania representatives Contestants competed under local title at Miss America pageant
1936	Anna Julia Zaker	Reading		Miss Reading		Top 15		Multiple Pennsylvania representatives Contestants competed under local title at Miss America pageant
1936	Marie Ketter	Ridgway		Miss Western Pennsylvania				Multiple Pennsylvania representatives Contestants competed under local title at Miss America pageant
1936	Sallie Hinton	York		Miss York				Multiple Pennsylvania representatives Contestants competed under local title at Miss America pageant
1935	Loretta Gale Tarle	Bridgeport		Miss Bridgeport				Multiple Pennsylvania representatives Contestants competed under local title at Miss America pageant
1935	Helen Rita Skelly	Conshocken		Miss Conshohocken				Multiple Pennsylvania representatives Contestants competed under local title at Miss America pageant
1935	Florence Carman	Upper Darby		Miss Delaware County				Multiple Pennsylvania representatives Contestants competed under local title at Miss America pageant
1935	Margie Godwin	Philadelphia		Miss Mayfair				Multiple Pennsylvania representatives Contestants competed under local title at Miss America pageant
1935	Marie Baumgard	Norristown		Miss Montgomery County				Multiple Pennsylvania representatives Contestants competed under local title at Miss America pageant
1935	Helen Keaser	Norristown		Miss Norristown	Vocal Medley, "Tell Me That You Love Me Tonight" & "You're a Heavenly Thing"	Top 12		Multiple Pennsylvania representatives Contestants competed under local title at Miss America pageant
1935	Jean McCool	Philadelphia		Miss Philadelphia	Vocal Medley, "Lovely To Look At" & "Little Things You Used To Do"	Top 12		Multiple Pennsylvania representatives Contestants competed under local title at Miss America pageant
1935	Henrietta Leaver	Pittsburgh	19	Miss Pittsburgh	Vocal / Tap Dance, "Living In a Great Big Way"	Winner	Henrietta Leaver Mider died on September 18, 1993, at age 77 of cancer in Columbus, Ohio.	Multiple Pennsylvania representatives Contestants competed under local title at Miss America pageant
1935	Alice Brown	Scranton		Miss Scranton				Multiple Pennsylvania representatives Contestants competed under local title at Miss America pageant
1935	Claire Spirit	Tamaqua		Miss Tamaqua				Multiple Pennsylvania representatives Contestants competed under local title at Miss America pageant
1935	Lenore Pollock	West Philadelphia		Miss West Philadelphia	Vocal, Piano, Banjo & Dance, "Dark Eyes" & "My Man"	Top 12		Multiple Pennsylvania representatives Contestants competed under local title at Miss America pageant
1935	Gertrude Schappert	Wilkes Barre		Miss Wilkes Barre				Multiple Pennsylvania representatives Contestants competed under local title at Miss America pageant
1934	No national pageant was held							
1933	Geraldine Glassman		17			Top 18		
1932	No national pageants were held							
1931	No national pageants were held							
1930	No national pageants were held							
1929	No national pageants were held							
1928	No national pageants were held							
1927	Florence Koons			Miss Pennsylvania				Multiple Pennsylvania representatives Contestants competed under local title at Miss America pageant
1927	Kathleen Coyle			Miss Philadelphia		Top 5		Multiple Pennsylvania representatives Contestants competed under local title at Miss America pageant
1927	Mary Millnack			Miss Pittsburgh				Multiple Pennsylvania representatives Contestants competed under local title at Miss America pageant
1927	Dorothea Ditmer			Miss Rochester		Top 10		Multiple Pennsylvania representatives Contestants competed under local title at Miss America pageant
1927	Esther J. Cantor			Miss Wilkes Barre				Multiple Pennsylvania representatives Contestants competed under local title at Miss America pageant
1926	Name unknown			Miss Lancaster				Multiple Pennsylvania representatives Contestants competed under local title at Miss America pageant
1926	Anna Mae Reefer			Miss Philadelphia		Top 15		Multiple Pennsylvania representatives Contestants competed under local title at Miss America pageant
1926	Thelma Williams			Miss Pittsburgh				Multiple Pennsylvania representatives Contestants competed under local title at Miss America pageant
1926	Esther Weissinger			Miss Pottsville				Multiple Pennsylvania representatives Contestants competed under local title at Miss America pageant
1926	Illa Williams			Miss Scranton				Multiple Pennsylvania representatives Contestants competed under local title at Miss America pageant
1926	Helen Villet Grant			Miss Wilkes Barre				Multiple Pennsylvania representatives Contestants competed under local title at Miss America pageant
1926	Name unknown			Miss Williamsport				Multiple Pennsylvania representatives Contestants competed under local title at Miss America pageant
1925
1925	Annette Jackson			Miss Philadelphia		N/A		Disqualified for being a professional model
1925	Mary Ann Guth			Miss Erie				Multiple Pennsylvania representatives Contestants competed under local title at Miss America pageant
1925	Estella Wittell			Miss Lancaster				Multiple Pennsylvania representatives Contestants competed under local title at Miss America pageant
1925	Mildred Walker			Miss Pittsburgh		Top 15		Multiple Pennsylvania representatives Contestants competed under local title at Miss America pageant
1925	Elsie Gallagher			Miss Pottsville				Multiple Pennsylvania representatives Contestants competed under local title at Miss America pageant
1925	Florence Zawidski			Miss Reading				Multiple Pennsylvania representatives Contestants competed under local title at Miss America pageant
1925	Beula Keator			Miss Scranton				Multiple Pennsylvania representatives Contestants competed under local title at Miss America pageant
1925	Mildred Sherman			Miss Uniontown				Multiple Pennsylvania representatives Contestants competed under local title at Miss America pageant
1924								Multiple Pennsylvania representatives Contestants competed under local title at Miss America pageant
1924	Ruth Malcomson	Philadelphia		Miss Philadelphia		Winner		Aunt of Miss Pennsylvania 1956, Lorna Malcomson Ringler, and great-aunt of Miss Delaware 1981, Jodi Meade Graham
1924	Katherine Brown			Miss Altoona				Multiple Pennsylvania representatives Contestants competed under local title at Miss America pageant
1924	Margaret McGee			Miss Delaware County				Multiple Pennsylvania representatives Contestants competed under local title at Miss America pageant
1924	Name unknown			Miss Erie				Multiple Pennsylvania representatives Contestants competed under local title at Miss America pageant
1924	Letne von Alt	Johnstown		Miss Johnstown				Multiple Pennsylvania representatives Contestants competed under local title at Miss America pageant
1924	Stella Springer	Lancaster		Miss Lancaster				Multiple Pennsylvania representatives Contestants competed under local title at Miss America pageant
1924	Name unknown			Miss Marcus Hook				Multiple Pennsylvania representatives Contestants competed under local title at Miss America pageant
1924	Dorothy E. Gross	Norristown		Miss Norristown				Multiple Pennsylvania representatives Contestants competed under local title at Miss America pageant
1924	Helen Steubne	Pittsburgh		Miss Pittsburgh				Multiple Pennsylvania representatives Contestants competed under local title at Miss America pageant
1924	Nellie M. Paige	Reading		Miss Reading				Multiple Pennsylvania representatives Contestants competed under local title at Miss America pageant
1924	Theresa Matzer			Miss Wilkes Barre				Multiple Pennsylvania representatives Contestants competed under local title at Miss America pageant
1923	Helen Noble	Allentown		Miss Allentown	N/A			Multiple Pennsylvania representatives Contestants competed under local title at national pageant
1923	Margaret Lillian Ross	Altoona		Miss Altoona	N/A			Multiple Pennsylvania representatives Contestants competed under local title at national pageant
1923	Agnes Connelly	Easton		Miss Easton	N/A			Multiple Pennsylvania representatives Contestants competed under local title at national pageant
1923	Dorothy Haupt	Erie		Miss Erie	N/A			Also competed in Miss America 1922 pageant as Miss Easton
1923	Helen R. Knisely	Harrisburg		Miss Harrisburg	N/A			Multiple Pennsylvania representatives Contestants competed under local title at national pageant
1923	Betty Grening	Johnstown		Miss Johnstown	N/A			Multiple Pennsylvania representatives Contestants competed under local title at national pageant
1923	Grace Kohr	Lebanon		Miss Lebanon	N/A			Multiple Pennsylvania representatives Contestants competed under local title at national pageant
1923	Mildred Maconachy	Norristown		Miss Norristown	N/A			Multiple Pennsylvania representatives Contestants competed under local title at national pageant
1923	Marion Green	Philadelphia		Miss Philadelphia	N/A	4th runner-up	Roller Chair Parade Third Prize	Multiple Pennsylvania representatives Contestants competed under local title at national pageant
1923	Isabel Lynch	Pottsville		Miss Pottsville	N/A		Roller Chair Parade Fourth Prize	Multiple Pennsylvania representatives Contestants competed under local title at national pageant
1923	Jane Ondeck	Reading		Miss Reading	N/A			Multiple Pennsylvania representatives Contestants competed under local title at national pageant
1923	Mary Botto	Sunbury		Miss Sunbury	N/A			Multiple Pennsylvania representatives Contestants competed under local title at national pageant
1922	Ellen E. Sherr	Allentown		Miss Allentown	N/A			Multiple Pennsylvania representatives Contestants competed under local title at national pageant
1922	Anna Marie Burke	Chester		Miss Chester	N/A			Multiple Pennsylvania representatives Contestants competed under local title at national pageant
1922	Dorothy Haupt	Easton		Miss Easton	N/A			Also competed in Miss America 1923 pageant as Miss Erie
1922	Thora McDannel	Erie		Miss Erie	N/A			Multiple Pennsylvania representatives Contestants competed under local title at national pageant
1922	Gertrude Shoemack	Harrisburg		Miss Harrisburg	N/A			Multiple Pennsylvania representatives Contestants competed under local title at national pageant
1922	Velma Ziegler	Johnstown		Miss Johnstown	N/A			Multiple Pennsylvania representatives Contestants competed under local title at national pageant
1922	Elsie Blumenstock	Lancaster		Miss Lancaster	N/A			Multiple Pennsylvania representatives Contestants competed under local title at national pageant
1922	Kathryn "Kitty" Molineaux	Philadelphia		Miss Philadelphia	N/A			Multiple Pennsylvania representatives Contestants competed under local title at national pageant
1922	Rae Bennett	Pittsburgh		Miss Pittsburgh	N/A			Multiple Pennsylvania representatives Contestants competed under local title at national pageant
1922	Leah M. Knapp	Fountain Springs		Miss Pottstown	N/A		Intercity Roller Chair Parade Second Prize	Multiple Pennsylvania representatives Contestants competed under local title at national pageant
1922	Evelyn Renninger	Reading		Miss Reading	N/A			Multiple Pennsylvania representatives Contestants competed under local title at national pageant
1922	Gladys Greenamyer	West Philadelphia	18	Miss West Philadelphia	N/A	Top 4	Amateur Beauty Award	Multiple Pennsylvania representatives Contestants competed under local title at national pageant
1921	Emma Pharo	Harrisburg		Miss Harrisburg	N/A			Multiple Pennsylvania representatives Contestants competed under local title at national pageant
1921	Nellie Orr	Philadelphia		Miss Philadelphia	N/A			Multiple Pennsylvania representatives Contestants competed under local title at national pageant
1921	Thelma Matthews	Pittsburgh		Miss Pittsburgh	N/A			Multiple Pennsylvania representatives Contestants competed under local title at national pageant
