= Rose Marie Brown =

American actress

Rose Marie Brown (April 15, 1919 – January 19, 2015) was an American theater actress who was crowned Miss Virginia in 1939. Then known by her birth name, Rose Marie Elliott, she placed fourth in the 13th Miss America pageant in Atlantic City. However, despite losing the pageant, she was discovered by Rodgers and Hammerstein, which led to a career on Broadway during the late 1930s and 1940s.

== Biography ==
Brown was born Rose Marie Elliott on April 15, 1919, in Suffolk, Virginia, to Rosa Marie (née Bruce) Elliott and Milton T. Elliott III. She attended Simmons College before entering local beauty pageants.

In 1939, Elliott won her first local pageant, winning the title Miss Peanut. She went on to win the sixth Miss Virginia pageant later that year. Elliott competed as Miss Virginia in the 13th Miss America competition in 1939, the last to be held at the Steel Pier in Atlantic City, New Jersey. She ultimately placed fourth, losing to Miss Michigan Patricia Donnelly. However, Elliott was spotted by a talent agent with MCA Inc., Maynard Morris, who invited her to audition for roles on Broadway. He reportedly told her father, "She’s got talent — you should send her to New York City."

Elliott moved to New York, where she enrolled as student at American Academy of Dramatic Arts, then located at Carnegie Hall. She accompanied a roommate to an audition, where she was noticed by Richard Rodgers and Oscar Hammerstein, who were in the audience observing the auditions. Rodgers and Hammerstein invited her to meet with them at their office the next morning. She was soon cast in her first Broadway production, One Touch of Venus, opposite actress Mary Martin. Elliott appeared in a string of Broadway productions, including the 1946 musical Annie Get Your Gun with Bert Lahr and Ethel Merman.

She married her husband, W. Donald Brown, following a meeting at a party, taking the name Rose Marie Brown. The couple, who had two sons, Josh Brown and Jeffrey Brown, were longtime residents of Darien, Connecticut. She died in her sleep at the Edgehill retirement community in Stamford, Connecticut, on January 19, 2015, at the age of 95. She was survived by her sons. Her husband died in 1999.
