= Frances Marie Burke =

American model (1922–2017)

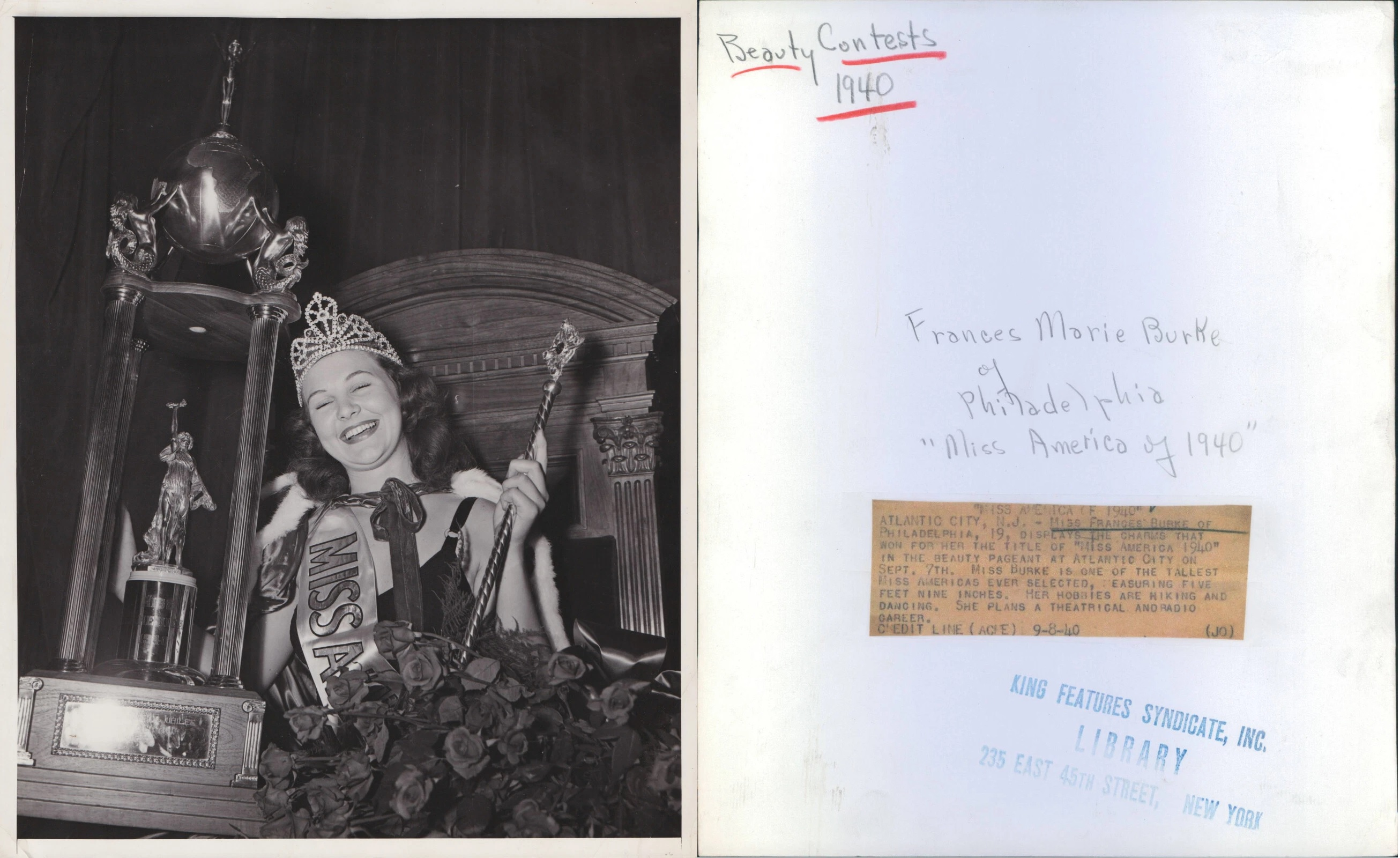
- Born: Frances Marie Burke; May 4, 1922; Philadelphia, Pennsylvania, U.S.A.
- Died: December 2, 2017 (aged 95)
- Title: Miss Philadelphia 1940; Miss America 1940
- Predecessor: Patricia Donnelly
- Successor: Rosemary LaPlanche
- Spouse: Lawrence Kenney (m. 1945)
- Children: 4

Frances Marie Kenney (née Burke; May 4, 1922 – December 2, 2017) was an American beauty pageant contestant who was the winner of Miss America in 1940.

== Biography ==
Burke was born in Philadelphia, Pennsylvania. She was crowned Miss America at the Boardwalk Hall in Atlantic City on September 7, 1940.

She competed in the pageant as Miss Philadelphia.

After winning the Miss America title Burke worked as a successful model. Despite opportunities in Hollywood, she chose to stay close to her family in Philadelphia.

Burke was married to Lawrence Kenney for 72 years and had four children (Missy, Wendy, Lawrence, and William) and was the grandmother of five boys and five girls.

She died at the home of her daughter on December 2, 2017, at the age of 95.

Preceded by Patricia Donnelly	Miss America; 1940	Succeeded by Rosemary LaPlanche

Preceded by Nancy Lee	Miss Philadelphia; 1940	Succeeded by Carrie de Ludo
