= Patricia Donnelly =

American beauty queen (1919–2009)

Patricia Mary Donnelly
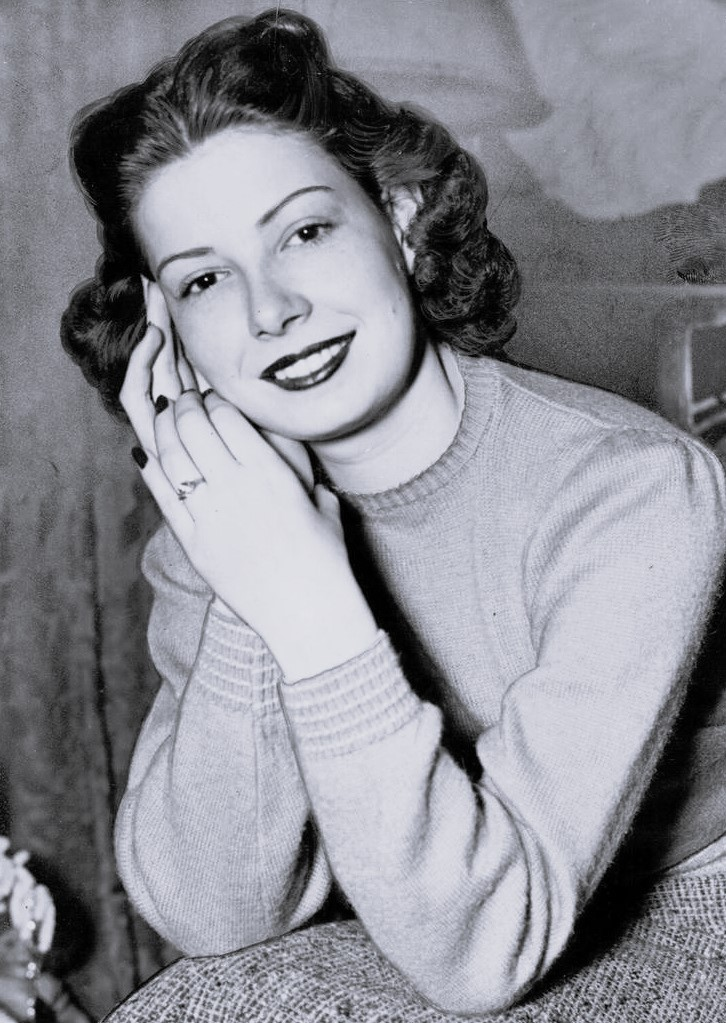
- Donnelly in 1940
- Born: Patricia Mary Harris; October 30, 1919; Durand, Michigan, U.S.
- Died: October 25, 2009 (aged 89)
- Other name: "The Long-Stemmed American Beauty"
- Occupations: Singer; Hollywood showgirl; model
- Title: Miss America 1939
- Spouse: Robin Harris (m. 1948)
- Children: 2

Patricia Mary Donnelly (née Harris, October 30, 1919 – October 25, 2009) was an American beauty queen who won Miss America in 1939. She subsequently briefly had a career as a singer and worked on stage and screen.

== Early years ==
Donnelly was born in Durand, Michigan. She was a singer in grade school and on radio programs, and she began singing with a band soon after she finished high school. She also worked as a model for Hudson's department store.

== Miss America ==
Donnelly was the last to be crowned at the Steel Pier. In the talent competition, she sang the then-new ballad "To You" and the faster-tempo "Old Man Mose". After winning the Miss America title, she traveled across the United States making personal appearances. She was given the nickname "The Long-Stemmed American Beauty".

== Career ==
Following her reign as Miss America, Donnelly sang at the Stork Club, on Broadway, and appeared in some films. She worked for the John Robert Powers modeling agency. Her Broadway credits included the musical revue Priorities of 1942 and the musical comedy The Lady Comes Across (1942).

En route to Chicago on the famous "Super Chief" of railways, she was introduced to Jack L. Warner of Warner Bros. Studio. He recognized her strong resemblance to Hollywood beauty, Ann Sheridan.

Soon a Hollywood contract was offered, but Donnelly turned it down. "I realized by that time I didn't want my face known," she said. "In other words, I wanted the freedom of movement, to go where I pleased without people knowing who I was."

== Personal life ==
Donnelly married Robin Harris in 1948 and had two children, Amanda and Stephen. For years she and Robin worked together as travel editors of the Hearst Newspapers.

In 1980, she was diagnosed with throat cancer after years of smoking cigarettes. She underwent a laryngectomy and spoke with the aid of a prosthesis.

Donnelly died on October 25, 2009, at the age of 89.

Awards and achievements
Preceded by Marilyn Meseke	Miss America; 1939	Succeeded by Frances Marie Burke
