= Miss America award winners =

Beauty pageant award winners

The most frequently presented Miss America awards are for preliminary talent and swimsuit. The talent award was introduced in 1936, and the swimsuit award in 1940. In the 2000s, preliminary awards for evening gown and interview were briefly introduced but were discontinued after two years as it was felt that they made the semi-finalists too predictable.

Other awards include Miss Congeniality, given out in the early years of the pageant and re-introduced at Miss America 2006, and the Quality of Life Award for a contestant's platform, first awarded in 1989.

== Preliminary awards ==
=== Preliminary on stage interview/Social Impact Pitch award ===
Year	Winner	State	Topic	Placement at Miss America	Notes
2023	Kelsey Hollis	Georgia	Autism Acceptance: A Platform for Change	4th Runner-up	
2023	Bailey Hodson	Iowa	Americans for the Arts – Advocate, Educate, Invest		
2022	Emma Broyles	Alaska	Creating Inclusive Communities Through Sports	Winner	
2022	Mallory Fuller	Texas	Mallory's Mission: Suicide Prevention	Top 10	
2021	The 2021 edition was cancelled due to the COVID-19 pandemic				
2020	Victoria Hill	Georgia		1st runner-up	Double preliminary winner
2020	Jade Glab	New Jersey		Top 15	
2019	Gabriela Taveras	Massachusetts	Americans' interactions abroad	4th runner-up	STEM Scholarship
2019	Emili McPhail	Virginia	Kneeling during the national anthem		
2019	Tianna Vanderhei	Wisconsin	Higher education	Top 15	
1921–2018	Not awarded at these pageants				

=== Preliminary talent award ===
Year	Winner	State	Talent	Placement at Miss America	Notes
2027	Kylie Gene Wright	New Jersey	Karate		
2027	Regan Hutsell	Texas	Jazz Dance	Winner	Former Radio City Rockette
2027	Erika Dalton	Utah	Violin		
2026	Kennedy Holland	Arkansas	Vocal	Top 11	
2026	Cassie Donegan	New York	Vocal	Winner	Previously Miss Virginia's Outstanding Teen 2013
2026	Jordyn Bristol	Utah	Vocal		
2025	Carley Vogel	Tennessee	Classical Vocal	2nd Runner Up	
2025	Page Weinstein	Pennsylvania	Dance Twirl		
2025	Carrie Everett	North Carolina	Vocal		
2024	Maya Amore	Michigan	Speed Painting		
2024	Taylor Loyd	North Carolina	Opera	Top 11	
2024	Veronica Druchniak	Maine	Aerial Arts		
2023	Elizabeth Hallal	Indiana	Vocal	Top 7	
2023	Grace Stanke	Wisconsin	Violin	Winner	
2022	Sydney Park	New York	Original Monologue	3rd runner-up	
2022	Isabelle Hanson	Illinois	Classical Violin	Top 10	
2021	The 2021 edition was cancelled due to the COVID-19 pandemic				
2020	Victoria Hill	Georgia	Classical Vocal	1st runner-up	Double preliminary winner
2020	Camille Schrier	Virginia	Chemistry Presentation	Winner	
2019	Taylor Tyson	Florida	Classical Piano	3rd runner-up	
2019	Lydia Tremaine	Indiana	Vocal	Top 15	
2019	Holli' Conway	Louisiana	Vocal	2nd runner-up	
2018	Laryssa Bonacquisti	Louisiana	Ventriloquism	Top 7	Double preliminary winner
2018	Brianna Drevlow	Minnesota	Classical Piano		
2018	JessiKate Riley	Utah	Classical Violin		
2017	Savvy Shields	Arkansas	Jazz Dance	Winner	
2017	Arianna Quan	Michigan	Piano		
2017	Grace Burgess	Tennessee	Vocal	Top 10	
2016	Betty Cantrell	Georgia	Vocal	Winner	
2016	Taylor Wiebers	Iowa	Vocal	Top 12	Double preliminary winner
2016	April Nelson	Louisiana	Vocal	3rd runner-up	
2015	Ramsey Carpenter	Kentucky	Fiddle	Top 12	
2015	Mackenzie Bart	Ohio	Ventriloquism	Top 10	
2015	Amanda Smith	Pennsylvania	Vocal		
2014	Myrrhanda Jones	Florida	Baton Twirling	3rd runner-up	
2014	Rebecca Yeh	Minnesota	Violin	4th runner-up	
2014	Samantha Russo	New Hampshire	Vocal		
2013	Joanna Guy	Maryland	Vocal	Top 10	
2013	Rosie Savageau	North Dakota	Piano and Vocal		
2013	Alicia Clifton	Oklahoma	Tap Dance	2nd runner-up	
2012	Lauren Cheape	Hawaii	Rope Jumping		
2012	Betty Thompson	Oklahoma	Irish Step Dancing	1st runner-up	
2012	Laura Kaeppeler	Wisconsin	Operatic Vocal	Winner	
2011	Teresa Scanlan	Nebraska	Piano	Winner	
2011	Adrienne Core	North Carolina	Clogging		
2011	Deborah Saint-Vil	Rhode Island	Vocal	Top 15	
2010	Kristy Cavinder	California	Ballet en pointe	1st runner-up	
2010	Nicole Blaszczyk	Michigan	Lyrical Dance		
2010	Caressa Cameron	Virginia	Vocal	Winner	
2009	Galen Giaccone	Delaware	Piano	Top 15	
2009	Chasity Hardman	Georgia	Vocal	1st runner-up	
2009	Ashley Wheeler	Vermont	Vocal		
2008	Dana Elaine Daunis	Connecticut	Vocal		
2008	Diana Reed	Iowa	Baton	Top 10	
2008	Valerie J. Amaral	Massachusetts	Vocal		
2007	Jacquelynne Fontaine	California	Operatic Vocal	Top 10	
2007	Pilialoha Gaison	Hawaii	Tahitian Dance	Top 10	
2007	Shilah Phillips	Texas	Vocal	1st runner-up	
2006	Dustin-Leigh Konzelman	California	Fiddle		
2006	Jennifer Berry	Oklahoma	Ballet en Pointe	Winner	
2006	Erika Grace Powell	South Carolina	Vocal	Top 10	
2005	Veena Goel	California	Jazz Dance	4th runner-up	
2005	Danica Tisdale	Georgia	Vocal	Top 10	
2005	Erika Ebbel	Massachusetts	Classical Piano		
2004	Kanoelani Gibson	Hawaii	Vocal	1st runner-up	
2004	Laurie Gray	Rhode Island	Classical Violin	Top 10	
2004	Tina Sauerhammer	Wisconsin	Classical cello	2nd runner-up	
2003	Tangra Riggle	Indiana	Contemporary Vocal	Top 15	
2003	Camille Lewis	Maryland	Crossover Classical Violin	4th runner-up	
2003	Casey Preslar	Oklahoma	Jazz Vocal	2nd runner-up	
2002	Marshawn Evans	District of Columbia	Rhythmic Dance Twirl	3rd runner-up	
2002	Becky Pruett	Mississippi	Vocal	Top 20	
2002	Katie Harman	Oregon	Classical Vocal	Winner	
2001	Rita Ng	California	Classical Piano	2nd runner-up	
2001	Junnie Cross	Delaware	Vocal		
2001	Jennifer Powers	Illinois	Classical Vocal		
2001	Faith Jenkins	Louisiana	Vocal	1st runner-up	Double preliminary winner
2000	Julie Lawrence	Louisiana	Ballet		
2000	Crystal Lewis	Virginia	Vocal		
2000	Mary-Louise Kurey	Wisconsin	Operatic Vocal	Top 10	
1999	Chera-Lyn Cook	Kentucky	Vocal	4th runner-up	
1999	Nicole Messina	District of Columbia	Tap Dance	Top 10	
1999	Julie Payne	Oklahoma	Tap Dance	Top 10	
1998	Michelle Warren	North Carolina	Vocal	1st runner-up	
1998	Christy Neuman	Florida	Rhythmic Gymnastics Dance	Top 10	
1998	Katherine Shindle	Illinois	Vocal	Winner	
1997	Shani Lynn Nielsen	Indiana	Vocal	Top 10	
1997	Patricia Leines	Oregon	Operatic Aria	2nd runner-up	Double preliminary winner
1997	Melissa Short	Hawaii	Opera	Top 10	Double preliminary winner
1996	Amanda Moody	Utah	Piano		
1996	Lisa Bamford	North Carolina	Piano		
1996	Helen Louise Goldsby	New York	Vocal	Top 10	
1995	Heather Whitestone	Alabama	Ballet en Pointe	Winner	Double preliminary winner
1995	Trisha Shaffer	Kansas	Vocal	Top 10	
1995	Yvonne Ku Dehner	Montana	Classical Vocal	Top 10	
1994	Titilayo Rachel Adedokun	Ohio	Classical Vocal	2nd runner-up	
1994	Lenena Holder	Mississippi	Operatic Aria		
1994	Patricia Ann-Regan McEachern	New Hampshire	Vocal		
1993	Pam McKelvy	Kansas	Vocal	3rd runner-up	
1993	Catherine Ann Lemkau	Iowa	Vocal	1st runner-up	Double preliminary winner
1993	Heather Hertling	New Jersey	Classical Vocal		
1992	Debra Renea Fries	Maryland	Baton		
1992	Lisa Somodi	Iowa	Classical Piano	3rd runner-up	
1992	Marisol A. Montalvo	New York	Opera	1st runner-up	
1991	Marjorie Vincent	Illinois	Classical Piano	Winner	
1991	Scarlet Annette Morgan	North Carolina	Opera		
1991	Suzanne Lawrence	Texas	Vocal	3rd runner-up	
1990	Kimilee Bryant	South Carolina	Classical Vocal		
1990	Tamara Denise Toshiko Marler	Oklahoma	Vocal	Top 10	
1990	Kristin Huffman	Ohio	Classical Vocal	4th runner-up	
1989	Sophia Christine Symko	Utah	Classical Piano		
1989	Gretchen Elizabeth Carlson	Minnesota	Violin	Winner	
1989	Lori Lee Kelley	Oklahoma	Operatic Aria	2nd runner-up	
1988	Maria Kim	Wisconsin	Piano		
1988	Patricia Brant	Louisiana	Ventroliquism	1st runner-up	
1988	Stacie James	Nevada	Vocal	2nd runner-up	
1987	Kelly Garver	Michigan	Fiddle	3rd runner-up	
1987	Kellye Cash	Tennessee	Piano/Vocal	Winner	Double preliminary winner
1987	Stephany Samone	Texas	Vocal	Top 10	
1986	Jonna Fitzgerald	Texas	Fiddle	2nd runner-up	
1986	Laurie Jean Broderick	Indiana	Baton	Top 10	
1986	Suellen Cochran	Ohio	Piano	Top 10	Double preliminary winner
1985	Lauren Susan Green	Minnesota	Classical Piano	3rd runner-up	
1985	Mary-Ann Farrell	New York	Piano	Top 10	
1985	Margaret Marie O'Brien	Massachusetts	Vocal	Top 10	
1984	Barbara Webster	Missouri	Fiddle	Top 10	
1984	Suzette Charles	New Jersey	Vocal	1st runner-up	
1984	Vanessa Williams	New York	Vocal	Winner	Double preliminary winner
1983	Dianne Evans	Mississippi	Vocal	2nd runner-up	
1983	Debra Maffett	California	Vocal	Winner	Double preliminary winner
1983	Gwendolyn Suzann Witten	Kentucky	Vocal	Top 10	
1982	Sandra Truitt	Illinois	Operatic Vocal	1st runner-up	
1982	Suzanne Alexander	New York	Operatic Vocal	Top 10	
1982	Sheri Rhyman	Texas	Gymnastics	4th runner-up	
1981	Paige Phillips	Alabama	Ventriloquism	1st runner-up	
1981	Cheryl Flanagan	New York	Tap Dance	Top 10	
1981	Susan Powell (tie)	Oklahoma	Classical Vocal	Winner	
1981	Doris Janell Hayes (tie)	Washington	Vocal	Top 10	
1980	Pam Wenzel	Arizona	Gymnastics	Top 10	
1980	Kelli Diane Krull	New York	Baton	Top 10	
1980	Tana Kay Carli	Ohio	Accordion	1st runner-up	
1979	Teresa Cheatham	Alabama	Semi-Classical Vocal	1st runner-up	Double preliminary winner
1979	Lori Ann Bergen	Kansas	Fiddle	Top 10	
1979	Carolyn Cline (tie)	Florida	Piano/Vocal	2nd runner-up	
1979	Guylyn Remmenga (tie)	Nebraska	Classical Piano	Top 10	
1978	Catherine LaBelle	Florida	Vocal	4th runner-up	
1978	Susan Perkins	Ohio	Vocal	Winner	
1978	Lynne Carol Grote	Pennsylvania	Piano	Top 10	
1977	Dorothy Kathleen Benham	Minnesota	Classical Vocal	Winner	Double preliminary winner
1977	Sonja Anderson (tie)	New York	Classical Vocal	4th runner-up	
1977	Carmen McCollum (tie)	Texas	Saxophone	2nd runner-up	Double preliminary winner
1977	Pamela Polk	Virginia	Operatic Vocal	Top 10	
1976	Cynthia Marie Carpenter	Massachusetts	Classical Piano	Top 10	
1976	Diana Lynn Pacini	Montana	Classical Piano		
1976	Susan Kay Banks	Ohio	Classical Vocal	3rd runner-up	
1975	Jean Ahern	Illinois	Ballet en Pointe	2nd runner-up	
1975	Darlene Compton	Kentucky	Vocal	3rd runner-up	
1975	Deborah Humphries Kincaid	Tennessee	Vocal	Top 10	
1974	Colleen Ann Metternich	Illinois	Piano	Top 10	
1974	Debbie Ward	Louisiana	Vocal	3rd runner-up	
1974	Tina Louise Thomas	Pennsylvania	Vocal	4th runner-up	
1973	Catherine Lawton	Delaware	Banjo	Top 10	
1973	Debby Robert	Louisiana	Classical Vocal	Top 10	
1973	Terry Anne Meeuwsen	Wisconsin	Vocal	Winner	Double preliminary winner
1972	Sandy Rings	Kansas	Ventriloquism	Top 10	
1972	Allyn E. Warner	Maine	Vocal	4th runner-up	
1972	Cynthia Cook (tie)	Georgia	Ventriloquism	Top 10	
1972	Maureen Wimmer (tie)	Pennsylvania	Operatic Vocal	3rd runner-up	
1971	Suzanne Dennie	Alabama	Piano/Vocal		
1971	Lisa Louise Donovan	Florida	Vocal	Top 10	
1971	Judy Ann Adams	Oklahoma	Violin	Top 10	
1970	Judith Mendenhall	Minnesota	Flute	4th runner-up	
1970	Patricia Brummet	New Mexico	Classical Vocal	Top 10	
1970	Kathy Lynn Baumann	Ohio	Acro dance	1st runner-up	Double preliminary winner
1969	Linda Fitts	Florida	Dance	Top 10	
1969	Judith Anne Ford	Illinois	Trampoline	Winner	Double preliminary winner
1969	Cherie Suzanne Davis	Virginia	Opera	Top 10	
1968	Dawn Lauree Cashwell	Florida	Baton Twirling	4th runner-up	
1968	Mary Lynn Haglund	Indiana	Figure Skating	Top 10	
1968	Marilyn Gail Cocozza	Rhode Island	Vocal	3rd runner-up	
1967	Charlene Diane Dallas	California	Piano	1st runner-up	Double preliminary winner
1967	Sharon Elaine Phillian	Ohio	Classical Vocal	3rd runner-up	
1967	Jane Anne Jayroe	Oklahoma	Vocal / Orchestra Conducting	Winner	
1966	Linda Folsom	Alabama	Opera	Top 10	
1966	Eileen Mary Smith	Indiana	Vocal Medley	2nd runner-up	
1966	Nancy Janice Moore	South Carolina	Piano Solo	Top 10	
1965	Vicki Jane Powers	Alabama	Opera	Top 10	
1965	Barbara Phyllis Hasselberg	Minnesota	Medley of Authentic Polynesian Dances	4th runner-up	
1965	Karen Victoria Kopseng	North Dakota	Classical Vocal		
1964	Judith Antoinette Short	Alabama	Marimba	Top 10	Double preliminary winner
1964	Rosanne Tueller	District of Columbia	Singing in French & Jazz Dance	1st runner-up	Double preliminary winner
1964	Dorcas Dara Campbell	Virginia	Classical & Popular Vocal Medley	Top 10	
1963	Patricia Lei Anderson	Hawaii	Opera	4th runner-up	
1963	Charlotte Ann Carroll	Mississippi	Popular Vocal & Dance	Top 10	
1963	Beverly Ann Smith (tie)	Maryland	Organ & Piano Solo		
1963	Mary Lee Jepson (tie)	Nebraska	Flaming Fire Baton Act	Top 10	
1962	Susan Ann Henryson	California	Popular Vocal Medley	Top 10	
1962	Linda Jacklyn Loftis	Texas	Opera	3rd runner-up	
1962	Carolyn Deann Lasater	Utah	Pantomime Dance	2nd runner-up	
1961	Tommye Lou Glaze	Indiana	Opera	4th runner-up	
1961	Marian Faye Walker	Utah	Opera	Top 10	
1961	Teresa Rinaldi (tie)	Alabama	Opera	Top 10	
1961	Nancy Fleming (tie)	Michigan	Presentation of Dress Design	Winner	Double preliminary winner
1961	Iris Elaine Thurwell	Canada	Vocal		Best Popular Singer in Talent
1960	Suzanne Ingeborg Johnson	Illinois	Vocal	Top 10	
1960	Ann Penelope Marston	Michigan	Archery Demonstration		
1960	Virginia Noble Pailes (tie)	District of Columbia	Vocal		
1960	Diana Martha Klug (tie)	Connecticut	Fashion Design Presentation & Speech		
1960	Lois Janet Piercy (tie)	Pennsylvania	Original Flute Solo & Art Display	Top 10	
1959	Lee Thornberry	Alabama	Song & Dance	Top 10	
1959	Billie June Turner	Connecticut	Ballet en Pointe	Top 10	
1959	Mary Ann Mobley	Mississippi	Classical & Popular Vocal Medley & Dance	Winner	
1958	Gloria Rupprecht	Indiana	Comedy Vocal		
1958	Sara Ann Cooper	Missouri	Dancing the Charleston	Top 10	
1958	Judith Hanson (tie)	Oregon	Opera	Top 10	
1958	Jennie Blatchford (tie)	Pennsylvania	Baton Twirling		
1957	Anne Stuart Ariall	Alabama	Vocal / Dance	2nd runner-up	
1957	Barbara Banks	Arkansas	Interpretive Ballet		
1957	Diane Knotek	Nebraska	Classical Vocal		
1956	Patricia Byrd Huddleston	Alabama	Classical Vocal	Top 10	
1956	Sandra Wirth	Florida	Fire Baton	Top 10	
1956	Virginia Maffucci	Massachusetts	Dramatic Monologue	Top 10	
1955	Linda Weisbrod	District of Columbia	Classical Vocal	Top 10	
1955	Barbara Maxine Quinlan	Ohio	Classical Vocal	Top 10	
1955	Janice Hutton Somers (tie)	Michigan	Vocal	4th runner-up	
1955	Heather Jo Taferner (tie)	New York	Operatic Vocal		
1954	Lois Ann Alava	Delaware	Piano	Top 10	
1954	Delores Jerde	South Dakota	Piano		
1954	Anna Lee Ceglis	Virginia	Classical Vocal	2nd runner-up	
1953	Iris Ann Fitch	District of Columbia	Vocal		
1953	Neva Jane Langley	Georgia	Classical Piano	Winner	Double preliminary winner
1953	Joan Elizabeth Kayne	New York City, NY	Dance	Top 10	
1952	Jeanne Moody	Alabama	Drama		
1952	Lu Long Ogburn	North Carolina	Piano	2nd runner-up	Double preliminary winner
1952	Colleen Kay Hutchins	Utah	Dramatic Monologue	Winner	
1951	Renee Roy	Connecticut	Comedy Sketch	Top 16	
1951	Sandra Joanne Stahl	District of Columbia	Classical Vocal	Top 16	
1951	Irene O'Connor	South Dakota	Dramatic Monologue	1st runner-up	
1949	Jacque Mercer	Arizona	Dramatic Monologue	Winner	Double preliminary winner
1949	Margaret Lynn Munn	Canada	Classical Vocal	Top 15	
1949	Gloria Yvonne Burkhart	Minnesota	Classical Violin	Top 15	
1948	Patti Anne Luer	Montana	Vocal / Dance	Top 15	
1948	Dorothy Jane Free	Tennessee	Vocal		
1948	Marilyn Robinson	Utah	Dramatic Monologue	Top 15	
1947	Barbara Jo Walker	Memphis, TN	Vocal & Art Display	Winner	
1947	Pepper Donna Shore	Miami Beach, FL	Hula / Rhumba	Top 15	
1947	Elaine Mary Campbell	Minnesota	Classical Vocal	1st runner-up	
1946	Emma Dale Nunnally	Alabama	Operatic Vocal		
1946	Jane Miller	Atlanta, GA	Classical Vocal	2nd runner-up	Double preliminary winner
1946	Eleanor D. Kramer	Pennsylvania	Vocal	Top 16	
1945	Polly Ellis	California	Vocal	Top 13	
1945	Arlene Anderson	Minnesota	Vocal / Marimba	4th runner-up	
1945	Frances Dorn (tie)	Birmingham, AL	Tap Dance	2nd runner-up	
1945	Bess Myerson (tie)	New York City, NY	Classical Piano & Flute Solo	Winner	Double preliminary winner
1944	Betty Jane Rase	Birmingham, AL	Vocal	4th runner-up	Double preliminary winner
1944	Venus Ramey	District of Columbia	Song & Dance	Winner	Double preliminary winner
1944	Virginia Warlen	Florida	Vocal	2nd runner-up	Double preliminary winner
1943	Helena Frances Mack	Boston, MA	Samba Dance	2nd runner-up	Double preliminary winner
1943	Jean Bartel	California	Vocal	Winner	Double preliminary winner
1943	Joan Hyldoft	Cincinnati, OH	Ice Skating		
1942	Barbara Patterson	Cincinnati, OH	Vocal		
1942	Marion Mosell	New York	Operatic Vocal		
1942	Jo-Carroll Dennison	Texas	Vocal	Winner	Double preliminary winner
1941	Virginia MacGraw	Birmingham, AL	Vocal	Top 15	
1941	Joey Augusta Paxton	North Carolina	Iloilo Ang Banwa Ko	4th runner-up	Double preliminary winner
1941	Roselle Marie Hannon	Western Pennsylvania	Bucasoy Folk Dance	1st runner-up	
1940	Catherine Virginia Howell	District of Columbia	Dance		
1940	Mary Eleanor Parish	Myrtle Beach, SC	Tap Dance		
1940	Monnie Drake (tie)	Michigan	Vocal	2nd runner-up	
1940	Kay Kittendorf (tie)	Montana	Operatic Vocal	Top 15	
1939	Marguerite Louise Skliris	California	Dramatic Monologue	3rd runner-up	
1939	Marion Rudeen	Minnesota	Acro-Dance	Top 15	
1939	Margaret Wood	North Carolina	Vocal	Top 15	
1938	Ruth Brady	Asbury Park, NJ	Vocal / Tap Dance	3rd runner-up	
1938	Gloria Smiley	Jacksonville, FL	Acrobatic Dance	4th runner-up	
1938	Muriel LaVon Goodspeed	Utah	Classical Vocal / Piano	2nd runner-up	
1937	Phyllis Randall	California	Vocal / Dance	3rd runner-up	
1937	Claire Nevulis	Massachusetts	Vocal / Tap Dance	Top 16	
1937	Grace Travis	New York City, NY	Vocal	Top 16	
1936	Gloria Levings	Birmingham, AL	Pandanggo sa Ilaw Folk Dance	4th runner-up	
1936	Phyllis Hume Dobson	California	Drama	1st runner-up	
1936	Rose Veronica Coyle	Philadelphia, PA	Vocal / Tap Dance	Winner	

=== Preliminary swimsuit award ===
There have multiple instances of ties for this preliminary award. This occurred at Miss America pageants in 1943, 1946, 1947, 1949, 1953, 1972, 1979, 1987, and 1993.

This award was discontinued since the Miss America 2019 competition and was replaced with state titleholders participating in a live interactive session with the judges, "to highlight her achievements and goals in life and how she will use her talents, passion, and ambition to perform the job of Miss America."

Year	Winner	State	Placement at Miss America	Notes
2019–present	Award discontinued			
2018	Sara Zeng	Florida		
2018	Laryssa Bonacquisti	Louisiana	Top 7	Double preliminary winner
2018	Margana Wood	Texas	4th runner-up	
2017	Cierra Jackson	District of Columbia		
2017	Hannah Brewer	Maryland	Top 7	
2017	Alice Magoto	Ohio		
2016	Daja Dial	South Carolina	Top 7	
2016	Mary Katherine Fechtel	Florida	Top 10	
2016	Taylor Wiebers	Iowa	Top 12	Double preliminary winner
2015	Victoria Cowen	Florida	3rd runner-up	
2015	Alex Eppler	Oklahoma	Top 10	
2015	Jade Kenny	Maryland		
2014	Carly Mathis	Georgia	Top 10	
2014	Kelsey Griswold	Oklahoma	2nd runner-up	
2014	Chelsea Rick	Mississippi	Top 15	
2013	Mandy Schendel	Washington	Top 10	
2013	Megan Ervin	Illinois	Top 10	
2013	Ali Rogers	South Carolina	1st runner-up	
2012	Danica Olsen	Utah		
2012	Kendall Morris	Texas	Top 10	
2012	Kaitlin Monte	New York	2nd runner-up	
2011	Jalee Fuselier	Hawaii	2nd runner-up	
2011	Ashley Davis	Alabama		
2011	Emoly West	Oklahoma	4th runner-up	
2010	CC Barber	Oregon	Top 15	Selected as Contestant's Choice
2010	Alyse Zwick	New York		
2010	Miriam Pabón	Puerto Rico		
2009	Katie Stam	Indiana	Winner	
2009	Leigh-Taylor Smith	New York	3rd runner-up	
2009	Christine Kozlowski	Mississippi		
2008	Kirsten Haglund	Michigan	Winner	
2008	Ashley Bickford	Rhode Island		
2008	Molly Hazlett	Texas	Top 8	
2007	Molly McGrath	Nebraska		
2007	Lauren Nelson	Oklahoma	Winner	
2007	Emily Wills	Pennsylvania	Top 10	
2006	Shannon Schambeau	District of Columbia	4th runner-up	
2006	Julia Bachison	Utah		
2006	Kristi Lauren Glakas	Virginia	3rd runner-up	
2005	Jenna Edwards	Florida		
2005	Jennifer Dupont	Louisiana	1st runner-up	
2005	Amy Davis	Utah		
2004	Nicole Lamarche	California	4th runner-up	
2004	Candace Glickman	New Hampshire	Top 10	
2004	Nancy Redd	Virginia	Top 10	
2003	Lauren Davidson	Arkansas		
2003	Jennifer Adcock	Mississippi	Top 10	
2003	Tiffany Walker	New York	Top 10	
2002	Emily Foster	Georgia		
2002	Abbie Lynne Rabine	Massachusetts	1st runner-up	
2002	Stephanie Culberson	Tennessee	2nd runner-up	
2001	Angela Perez Baraquio	Hawaii	Winner	
2001	Whitney Boyles	Kentucky	4th runner-up	
2001	Faith Jenkins	Louisiana	1st runner-up	Double preliminary winner
2001	Christy May	Mississippi	3rd runner-up	
2000	Heather French	Kentucky	Winner	
2000	Gina Giacinto	Nevada		
2000	Karen Lindsay	Rhode Island		
1999	Joslyn Jamie Tinker	Alaska	Top 10	
1999	Lissette Gonzalez	Florida	2nd runner-up	
1999	Kelli Bradshaw	North Carolina	1st runner-up	
1998	Rebekah Ann Keller	California	4th runner-up	
1998	Erika Kauffman	Hawaii	Top 10	
1998	Kathy Nejat	New Jersey		
1997	Melissa Short	Hawaii	Top 10	Double preliminary winner
1997	Tara Dawn Holland	Kansas	Winner	
1997	Patricia Leines	Oregon	2nd runner-up	Double preliminary winner
1996	Tiffany Stoker	California	3rd runner-up	
1996	Tracy Hayes	Illinois	4th runner-up	
1996	Amy Beth Keller	Kansas	Top 10	
1995	Heather Whitestone	Alabama	Winner	Double preliminary winner
1995	Tiffany Storm	Indiana	4th runner-up	
1995	Cullen Johnson	Virginia	1st runner-up	
1994	Lisa Duncan	California		
1994	Kara Kim Martin	Georgia	1st runner-up	
1994	Cynthia Sims	West Virginia		
1993	Shelli Yoder (tie)	Indiana	2nd runner-up	
1993	Catherine Lemkau (tie)	Iowa	1st runner-up	Double preliminary winner
1993	Tawyna Mullins	Kentucky	Top 10	
1993	Carrie Lee Davis	South Carolina	Top 10	
1992	Carolyn Sapp	Hawaii	Winner	
1992	Christi Page	Louisiana	Top 10	
1992	Elizabeth Anne Johnson	Utah		
1991	Karrie Mitchell	Colorado	Top 10	
1991	Beth Howell	Mississippi		
1991	Dana Dalton	Florida		
1990	Jeri Lynn Zimmerman	Illinois	3rd runner-up	
1990	Stacy King	Louisiana		
1990	Debbye Turner	Missouri	Winner	
1989	Melissa Aggeles	Florida	Top 10	
1989	Valerie Brosset	Louisiana	Top 10	
1989	Carla Haag	Mississippi	Top 10	
1988	Kelly Jerles	Georgia		
1988	Kaye Lani Rae Rafko	Michigan	Winner	
1988	Nancy Humphries	South Carolina		
1987	Tamara Tungate	Missouri	4th runner-up	
1987	Dawn Elizabeth Smith (tie)	South Carolina	2nd runner-up	
1987	Kellye Cash (tie)	Tennessee	Winner	Double preliminary winner
1987	Julianne Smith	Virginia	1st runner-up	
1986	Angela Tower	Alabama	4th runner-up	
1986	Susan Akin	Mississippi	Winner	
1986	Suellen Cochran	Ohio	Top 10	Double preliminary winner
1985	Katherine Manning	Mississippi	2nd runner-up	
1985	Tamara Hext	Texas	4th runner-up	
1985	Sharlene Wells	Utah	Winner	
1984	Wanda Geddie	Mississippi	3rd runner-up	
1984	Vanessa Williams	New York	Winner	Double preliminary winner
1984	Pamela Rigas	Ohio	4th runner-up	
1983	Debra Maffett	California	Winner	Double preliminary winner
1983	Elizabeth Williams	North Carolina		
1983	Desiree Daniels	Tennessee	1st runner-up	
1982	Elizabeth Ward	Arkansas	Winner	
1982	Karen Hopson	Mississippi	Top 10	
1982	Kristine Weitz	Washington		
1981	Lencola Sullivan	Arkansas	4th runner-up	
1981	Debra Goodwin	Minnesota		
1981	Donna Pope	Mississippi	2nd runner-up (tie)	
1980	Shelly Peiken	Maryland		
1980	Cheryl Prewitt	Mississippi	Winner	
1980	Monta Maki	North Carolina		
1979	Teresa Cheatham (tie)	Alabama	1st runner-up	Double preliminary winner
1979	Janice Anne Albro	Delaware		
1979	Sue Erickson	Minnesota		
1979	Cheri Brown (tie)	Mississippi		
1978	Bunnie Holbert	Arkansas		
1978	Catherine Hinson	South Carolina	2nd runner-up	
1978	Linda Moore	Tennessee	Top 10	
1977	Dorothy Benham	Minnesota	Winner	Double preliminary winner
1977	Lavinia Cox	South Carolina	1st runner-up	
1977	Carmen McCollum	Texas	2nd runner-up	Double preliminary winner
1976	Paula Roach	Arkansas		
1976	Janet Carr	California	2nd runner-up	
1976	Debra Cusick	Rhode Island		
1975	Lucianne Buchanan	California	1st runner-up	
1975	Karen Smith	Kansas		
1975	Shirley Cothran	Texas	Winner	
1974	Suzanne Plummer	New Jersey	2nd runner-up	
1974	Leslie Ann Mays	Washington	Top 10	
1974	Judy Hieke	Wisconsin	1st runner-up	
1973	Rebecca Sue Graham	Indiana	4th runner-up	
1973	Cindy Lee Sykes	Kansas	Top 10	
1973	Terry Anne Meeuwsen	Wisconsin	Winner	Double preliminary winner
1972	Carolyn Stoner	California		
1972	Laurie Lea Schaefer	Ohio	Winner	
1972	Linda Moyer (tie)	Virginia		
1972	Susan Buckner (tie)	Washington	Top 10	
1971	Kathleen O'Sullivan	Hawaii		
1971	Claudia Turner	South Carolina	1st runner-up	
1971	Phyllis George	Texas	Winner	
1970	Carol Norval	Connecticut		
1970	Pamela Eldred	Michigan	Winner	
1970	Kathy Baumann	Ohio	1st runner-up	Double preliminary winner
1969	Dellynne Catching	Alabama	Top 10	
1969	Judith Anne Ford	Illinois	Winner	Double preliminary winner
1969	Susan Thompson	Iowa	2nd runner-up	
1968	Sharon Ann Evans	Arkansas		
1968	Kristine Phillips	Idaho		
1968	Debra Dene Barnes	Kansas	Winner	
1967	Charlene Diane Dallas	California	1st runner-up	Double preliminary winner
1967	Nancy Anne Naylor	New Hampshire	4th runner-up	
1967	Barbara Ann Harris	South Carolina		
1966	Deborah Irene Bryant	Kansas	Winner	
1966	Patricia Anne Puckett	Mississippi	1st runner-up	
1966	Kathryn Elizabeth Blaikie	Nevada		
1965	Sherri Lee Raap	California		
1965	Jane Nelson	New Mexico	Top 10	
1965	Ella Dee Kessel	West Virginia	2nd runner-up	
1964	Judith Antoinette Short	Alabama	Top 10	Double preliminary winner
1964	Donna Axum	Arkansas	Winner	
1964	Rosanne Tueller	District of Columbia	1st runner-up	Double preliminary winner
1963	Pamela Gilbert	Illinois		
1963	Carole Jean Van Valin	Michigan	Top 10	
1963	Joan Mary Engh	Wisconsin	1st runner-up	
1962	Frances Jane Anderson	Arkansas	1st runner-up	
1962	Nancee Ann Parkinson	Minnesota	4th runner-up	
1962	Maria Fletcher	North Carolina	Winner	
1961	Ruth Rea	District of Columbia	3rd runner-up	
1961	Nancy Fleming	Michigan	Winner	Double preliminary winner
1961	Edith Sandra Browning	South Carolina	Top 10	
1960	Bonnie Jo Marquis	New York	Top 10	
1960	Sharon Joyce Vaughn	Washington	2nd runner-up	
1960	Mary Alice Fox	Wisconsin	1st runner-up	
1959	Sandra Lee Jennings	California	3rd runner-up	
1959	Anita Marie Hursh	Indiana		
1959	Betty Lane Evans	North Carolina	4th runner-up	
1958	Lynn Freyse	Arizona	Top 10	
1958	Jody Elizabeth Shattuck	Georgia	1st runner-up	
1958	Elaine Herndon	North Carolina	Top 10	
1957	Joan Colleen Beckett	California	Top 10	
1957	Sandra Jean Stuart	Chicago	Top 10	
1957	Jere Wright	Hawaii	Top 10	
1956	Barbara Mamo Vieira	Hawaii	Top 10	
1956	Clara Faye Arnold	North Carolina	3rd runner-up	
1956	Ann Campbell	Oklahoma	4th runner-up	
1955	Lee Meriwether	California	Winner	
1955	Ann Gloria Daniel	Florida	1st runner-up	
1955	Polly Rankin Suber	South Carolina	2nd runner-up	
1954	Patricia Ann Johns	California	Top 10	
1954	Evelyn Margaret Ay	Pennsylvania	Winner	
1954	Elaine Holkenbrink	Wyoming	Top 10	
1953	Gwen Harmon (tie)	Alabama	3rd runner-up	
1953	Jeanne Shores (tie)	California	2nd runner-up	
1953	Jo Hoppe	Chicago	4th runner-up	
1953	Neva Jane Langley	Georgia	Winner	Double preliminary winner
1952	Charlotte Rosalie Simmen	Arkansas	3rd runner-up	
1952	Lu Long Ogburn	North Carolina	2nd runner-up	Double preliminary winner
1952	Marlene Margaret Rieb	South Dakota	Top 10	
1951	Yolande Betbeze	Alabama	Winner	
1951	Mary Jennings	Arkansas	3rd runner-up	
1951	Joanne Durant	California	Top 16	
1949	Jacque Mercer (tie)	Arizona	Winner	Double preliminary winner
1949	Jone Ann Pedersen (tie)	California	4th runner-up	
1949	Sylvia Canady	Colorado	3rd runner-up	
1949	Trudy Germi	Illinois	2nd runner-up	
1948	Jerry Long	Atlanta, GA	Top 15	
1948	Vera Ralston	Kansas	3rd runner-up	
1948	BeBe Shopp	Minnesota	Winner	
1947	Peggy Jane Elder (tie)	Alabama	3rd runner-up	
1947	Margaret Marshall	Canada	2nd runner-up	
1947	Evelyn L. Murray	Kentucky		
1947	Raven Malone (tie)	New York City	Top 15	
1946	Rebecca Jane McCall	Arkansas	1st runner-up	
1946	Janey Miller (tie)	Atlanta, GA	2nd runner-up	Double preliminary winner
1946	Marilyn Buferd	California	Winner	
1946	Eileen Henry (tie)	New York City	Top 16	
1945	Lee Wieland	Chicago	Top 13	
1945	Bess Myerson	New York City	Winner	
1945	Lee Henson	Tennessee	Top 13	
1944	Betty Jane Rase	Birmingham, AL	4th runner-up	Double preliminary winner
1944	Venus Ramey	District of Columbia	Winner	Double preliminary winner
1944	Virginia Warlen	Florida	2nd runner-up	Double preliminary winner
1943	Helena Frances Mack (tie)	Boston, MA	2nd runner-up	Double preliminary winner
1943	Jean Bartel	California	Winner	Double preliminary winner
1943	Dixie Lou Rafter	District of Columbia	4th runner-up	
1943	Emma Hammermeister (tie)	Western Pennsylvania	Top 10	
1942	Marie Duncan	Birmingham, AL	Top 10	
1942	Bette Brunk	Chicago	1st runner-up	
1942	Jo-Carroll Dennison	Texas	Winner	Double preliminary winner
1941	Rosemary LaPlanche	California	Winner	
1941	Dorothy Slatten	Kentucky	Top 15	
1941	Joey Augusta Paxton (tie)	North Carolina	4th runner-up	Double preliminary winner
1941	Lillian Helen O'Donnell (tie)	Westchester County, NY	3rd runner-up	
1940	Rosemary LaPlanche	California	1st runner-up	
1940	Dorothy Slatten	Kentucky	4th runner-up	
1940	Frances Marie Burke	Philadelphia, PA	Winner	

== Jean Bartel Quality of Life / Social Impact Initiative Scholarship award ==
The Quality of Life Award was initially sponsored by Fruit of the Loom. From its inception in 1989 until 2002, the winner received a $10,000 scholarship. For Miss America 2003, the value of the award was reduced to $6,000 for the winner, and the amount was reduced again to $3,000 from Miss America 2006. In 2008, the scholarship returned to $6,000. In 2020, award named was changed to the "Jean Bartel Social Impact Initiative Scholarship Award." The Miss America Organization announced the return of the Quality of Life Award in July 2025.

Year	Winner	State	Platform	Placement at Miss America
2027	Alexandra de Roos	Florida	"The Blue Project"	
2026	Paris Richardson	Florida	"C.R.O.W.N. of Health"	2nd runner-up
2025	Award not presented			
2024	Award not presented			
2023	Emmie Perkins	Mississippi	"Music is Medicine"	
2022	Lauren Bradford	Alabama	UNPLUG: The Digital Diet Plan	1st runner-up
2021	The 2021 edition was cancelled due to the COVID-19 pandemic			
2020	Annika Wooton	Kansas	The Artist's Fingerprint: The Transformative Power of the Arts	Top 15
2019	Claudia Raffo	Arkansas	New Life Saves Lives: Umbilical Cord Donation	
2018	Jessica Procter	Alabama	Step Up to the Plate: Decreasing Food Insecurity	Top 7
2017	Hayley Barber	Alabama	Sight for Small Eyes	
2016	Lindsey Giannini	New Jersey	Dangers of Distracted Driving	
2015	Caitlin Brunell	Alabama	Caitlin's Closet: One Stop Shopping for Life	Top 10
2014	Haley Williams	Michigan	Through a Child's Eyes: Conquering Childhood Grief	
2013	Anna Laura Bryan	Alabama	P.A.W.S. for Autism: People and Animals Working Side-by-side	Top 12
2012	Ann-Blair Thornton	Kentucky	Alzheimer's Awareness Research	
2011	Katie LaRoche	Michigan	Raising Awareness of Human Trafficking	
2010	Taylor Treat	Oklahoma	Service Learning	Top 12
2009	Emily Cox	Kentucky	Uniquely Me: Promoting Self-Esteem in Adolescent Girls	Top 12
2008	Caleche Manos	Nevada	M.A.D.D. – Prevention of Drinking and Driving Through Education	
2007	Allison Rogers	Rhode Island	Go Green! Global Warming Awareness	
2006	Tracey Brown	Idaho	Breast Cancer Awareness: Education, Support and Research	
2005	Deidre Downs	Alabama	Curing Childhood Cancer	Winner
2004	Catherine Crosby	Alabama	First Vote: America's Freedom to Choose	Top 15
2003	Teresa Benitez	Nevada	Poverty: A N.E.W. Focus	3rd runner-up
2002	Jaclyn Hunt	Utah	Organ, Eye and Tissue Donation	Top 10
2001	Faith Jenkins	Louisiana	Illiteracy Prevention/Eradication	1st runner-up
2000	Brandee Helbick	New Hampshire	Educational Disabilities Awareness	
1999	Heather Davis	Maryland	Drug-Free L.I.F.E. for Youth/Peer Mentorship	
1998	Jennifer Ostergaard	Minnesota	Child Abuse Education, Awareness, and Prevention	
1997	Alison McCreary	Alabama	Hospice: A Special Kind of Caring	3rd runner-up
1996	Dena Querubin	New Jersey	Adopt-A-Grandparent	
1995	Stacy Agren	Arizona		
1994	Amanda Murray	Arizona	Asthma Support Program	
1993	Kim Wimmer	Alabama	Education of Homeless Youth	
1992	Cheryl Lynn Majercik	Illinois	AIDS Hospice service	
1991	Suzanne Lawrence	Texas	"Smiles Against Cancer" organization	3rd runner-up
1990	Michelle Kline	Pennsylvania	Organ Donation	Top 10
1921–1989	Not awarded at these pageants			

== Miss Congeniality ==
Year	Winner	State	Placement at Miss America
2027	Adella Harris	Montana	
2026	Award not announced		
2025	Katie Ann Powell	District of Columbia	
2024	Cydney Bridges	Indiana	2nd runner-up
2023	Hannah Edelen	Kentucky	
2022	Mariah Larocque	Maine	
2021	The 2021 edition was cancelled due to the COVID-19 pandemic		
2020	Grace Zimmerman	Idaho	
2019	Julia Crane	Vermont	
2018	Angelina Klapperich	Alaska	Top 15
2017	Madeline Van Ert	Minnesota	
2016	Jeanné Kapela	Hawaii	
2015	Jacky Arness	North Dakota	Top 16
2014	Brooke Mosteller (tie)	South Carolina	
2014	Ciera Pekarcik (tie)	Utah	
2013	Sloane Roberts	Arkansas	
2012	Kayla Batt	Nebraska	
2011	Katie Lynn LaRoche	Michigan	
2010	Raeceen Woolford	Hawaii	Top 7
2009	Rebecca Robinson	Texas	
2008	Ashley Young	North Dakota	
2007	Melinda Toole	Alabama	4th runner-up
2006	Malika Dudley	Hawaii	
2005	Olena Rubin	Hawaii	
1976–2004	Award was discontinued		
1975	Rhonda Kay Pope (tie)	Arkansas	
1975	Coline-Helen Kanaloku Aiu (tie)	Hawaii	
1974	Kanoelehua Kaumeheiwa	Hawaii	
1973	Sally Peterson	Utah	
1972	Paula Kusmer	Delaware	
1971	Debbie May	Indiana	
1970	Jane Deliese Briggeman	Nebraska	
1969	Karen Maciolek	New Mexico	
1968	Sharon Evans (tie)	Arkansas	
1968	Tia Tyler (tie)	Colorado	
1968	Sheila Scott (tie)	New Hampshire	
1967	Linda MacLim	Virginia	
1966	Marie Mushro	Iowa	
1965	Vonda Kay Van Dyke	Arizona	Winner
1964	Jeanne Flinn Swanner	North Carolina	
1963	Margaret Farrar Wass	New Hampshire	
1962	Susan Henryson (tie)	California	Top 10
1962	Rosita Giusti Haito Rey (tie)	Puerto Rico	
1961	Susan Talbert	New York	
1960	Gordean Leilehua Lee	Hawaii	
1959	Ann Louise Willis	Rhode Island	
1958	Glynnelle Hubbard	New Mexico	
1957	Sandra Simpson	Vermont	
1956	Barbara Mamo Vieira	Hawaii	Top 10
1955	Patsy Bruce	Illinois	
1954	Patricia Condon	New Jersey	
1953	Iris Fitch (tie)	District of Columbia	
1953	Shirley Barbour (tie)	Oklahoma	
1952	Claire Katherine Heen (tie)	Hawaii	
1952	Otilia Jimenez (tie)	Puerto Rico	
1951	Dell'finn Kalaupaona Poaha	Hawaii	
1949	Carol Rosebel Fraser (tie)	Montana	
1949	Betty Jane Crowley (tie)	New Jersey	Top 15
1948	Yun Tau Zane	Hawaii	
1947	Luna McClain	Texas	
1946	Violet Mellar	New York	Top 16
1945	Georgina E. Patterson	Northern British Columbia	
1944	Joyce Courrege	Texas	
1943	Toula Hagestratou	Birmingham, AL	
1942	Dorothy Fox	Mississippi	
1941	Mifaunwy Dolores Shunatona	Oklahoma	Top 15
1940	Not awarded at this pageant		
1939	Doris Coggins	Mississippi	
1921–1938	Not awarded at these pageants		

== America's Choice ==
In 2008, the Miss America Organization introduced this award in which viewers could cast votes online for a specific state titleholder a month before the final night of pageant. The state titleholder with the most votes is then given an automatic spot in the semi-finals, regardless of her performance in the preliminary competition. In 2022, the state titleholder with the most votes won an extra $5,000 scholarship.

Year	Winner	State	Placement at Miss America	Notes
2024	Courtney Wages	Kansas	Top 11	
2023	Monica Nia Jones	Illinois	Top 11	
2022	Vivian Zhong	Michigan	N/A	STEM Scholarship award
2021	The 2021 edition was cancelled due to the COVID-19 pandemic			
2019–2020	Not awarded at these pageants/competitions			
2018	Abby Foster	Illinois	Top 15	
2017	Laura Katherine Jones	Kentucky	Top 12	
2016	Hannah Robison	Tennessee	Top 7	
2015	Sierra Sandison	Idaho	Top 16	
2014	Theresa Vail	Kansas	Top 10	
2013	Alexis Wineman	Montana	Top 16	
2012	Betty Thompson	Oklahoma	1st runner-up	
2011	Kayla Martell	Delaware	Top 10	
2011	Claire Buffie	New York	Top 12	
2010	Sarah Slocum	Arkansas	Top 15	Selected from the Miss America pre-pageant special, Miss America: Behind the Curtain
2010	Mallory Ervin	Kentucky	4th runner-up	Selected from the Miss America pre-pageant special, Miss America: Behind the Curtain
2009	Amanda Tapley	Alabama	Top 15	Selected from TLC show, Miss America: Countdown to the Crown
2009	Chastity Hardman	Georgia	1st runner-up	Selected from TLC show, Miss America: Countdown to the Crown
2009	Katie Stam	Indiana	Winner	Selected from TLC show, Miss America: Countdown to the Crown
2009	Alexandra Hoffman	South Dakota	Top 15	Selected from TLC show, Miss America: Countdown to the Crown
2008	Jill Stevens	Utah	Top 15	
1921–2007	Not awarded at these pageants			

== STEM scholarship award ==
At the Miss America 2014 pageant, the Miss America Organization introduced this $5,000 scholarship to be given to state titleholders with strong science, technology, engineering, and mathematics (STEM) backgrounds with the goal of highlighting the vital and active roles women have in these fields.

Year	Winner	State	Placement at Miss America	Notes
2023	Victoria Chuah	Virginia		
2022	Vivian Zhong	Michigan		Award Sponsored by Miss America
2022	Lauren Bradford	Alabama	1st runner-up	Award Sponsored by University of South Dakota
2021	The 2021 edition was cancelled due to the COVID-19 pandemic			
2020	Morgan Nichols	South Carolina		
2019	Gabriela Taveras	Massachusetts	4th runner-up	Preliminary On Stage Interview Award
2019	Laura Haller	Montana		
2019	Alexis Hilts	Nevada		
2018	Briana Kinsey	District of Columbia	3rd runner-up	
2018	Molly Matney	Kentucky		
2018	Jillian Zucco	Massachusetts		
2017	Hayley Barber	Alabama		Children's Miracle Network (CMN) Miracle Maker Award Quality of Life Award
2017	Jaryn Franklin	Illinois		
2017	Kendall Schoenekase	Kansas		
2016	Kelley Johnson	Colorado	2nd runner-up	
2016	Hannah Roberts	Mississippi	1st runner-up	
2016	Hannah Robison	Tennessee	Top 7	America's Choice
2016	Alayna Westcom	Vermont		
2016	Lizzi Jackson	Washington		
2015	Maggie Bridges	Georgia		
2015	Lauren Kuhn	Massachusetts	4th runner-up	
2015	Jessica Burson	New Mexico		
2015	Mackenzie Bart	Ohio	Top 10	Preliminary Talent Award
2015	Lucy Edwards	Vermont		
2014	Crystal Lee	California	1st runner-up	
2014	Chelsea Rick	Mississippi	Top 15	Preliminary Lifestyle & Fitness Award
1921–2013	Not awarded at these pageants			

== Women in Business Scholarship award ==
Year	Winner	State	Placement at Miss America	Notes
2023	Averie Bishop	Texas	2nd Runner-Up	First Asian American to win the title of Miss Texas Ran for Texas' 112th House of Representatives district in 2024
2022	Meghan Sinsi	Pennsylvania		
2021	The 2021 edition was cancelled due to the COVID-19 pandemic			
2020	Alex Francke	Kentucky		
2019	Penelope Ng Pack	Hawaii		Non-finalist Talent Award
2019	Carrie Wintle	South Dakota		
2018	Meredith Winnefeld	Colorado		Non-finalist Talent Award
2018	Sarah Clapper	Ohio		
2017	Patricia Ford	Georgia		
2017	Shruti Nagarajan	Rhode Island		
1921–2016	Not awarded at these pageants			

== Equity and Justice Scholarship award ==
In September 2019, the Miss America Organization announced that a new scholarship, the Equity and Justice Scholarship, will be awarded at the 2020 competition to the candidate, "who best exemplifies inclusion and acceptance of these principles in her social impact initiative." The winner receives a $3,000 scholarship.

Year	Winner	State	Social Impact Initiative	Placement	Notes
2023	Heather Renner	Nevada	"Performing for a Purpose"		
2022	Sasha Sloan	Utah	"RISE for Refugees: Refugee Inclusivity, Support, and Education"	Top 10	
2021	The 2021 edition was cancelled due to the COVID-19 pandemic				
2020	Alexandra Badgett	North Carolina	"N.I.N.E.: No is Not Enough"	Top 15	
1921-2019	Not awarded at these pageants				
