= Pamela Eldred =

American beauty pageant titleholder

- Born: April 21, 1948; West Bloomfield, Michigan, United States
- Died: July 12, 2022 (aged 74); West Bloomfield, Michigan, United States
- Title: Miss Detroit 1969; Miss Michigan 1969; Miss America 1970
- Predecessor: Judith Ford
- Successor: Phyllis George
- Spouses: Jules F. Levey; Norman Robbins (m. 1998)
- Children: 1

Pamela Anne Eldred-Robbins (April 21, 1948 - July 12, 2022) was an American beauty pageant titleholder who was crowned Miss Michigan 1969 and later Miss America 1970.

== Early life and education ==
Eldred is from West Bloomfield and graduated from University of Detroit Mercy.

== Pageantry ==
She was crowned Miss America 1970 on September 6, 1969. During the Vietnam War, she toured the country entertaining American soldiers as part of a United Services Organization show. She received a citation for courage after being fired at by the enemy during a show. As a ballerina, Eldred performed a dance in the Miss America talent competition to music from Romeo and Juliet. One of the five finalists Eldred defeated in the Miss America 1970 pageant was singer and actress Susan Anton. She was the first American ballerina to dance with the Russian ballet dancer Rudolf Nureyev in 1984.

She participated in the homecoming of Kirsten Haglund along with Nancy Fleming Lange and Kaye Lani Rae Rafko Wilson, both former Miss Michigans who also became Miss America. After the pageant, Eldred worked with people with disabilities due to her being the first to mention disabled people during the Miss America pageant.

== Personal life ==
Eldred's father worked for Chrysler and she often had to act as a model in car shows as a way for her to earn scholarship money due to her family needing use most of their income to support her disabled sister. After her year as Miss America 1970, she married Dr. Jules F. Levey and had a daughter, Hilary Levey (Friedman), a Harvard-educated sociologist. She remarried in 1998 to lawyer Norman Robbins, who was 29 years her senior. Eldred died of kidney failure in her native Michigan on July 12, 2022, at the age of 74.

Awards and achievements
Preceded by Judith Ford	Miss America; 1970	Succeeded by Phyllis George
Preceded by Darlene Kurant	Miss Michigan; 1969	Succeeded by Sandra Gillespie
