= Miss North Carolina =

Beauty pageant competition

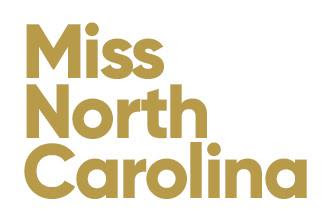

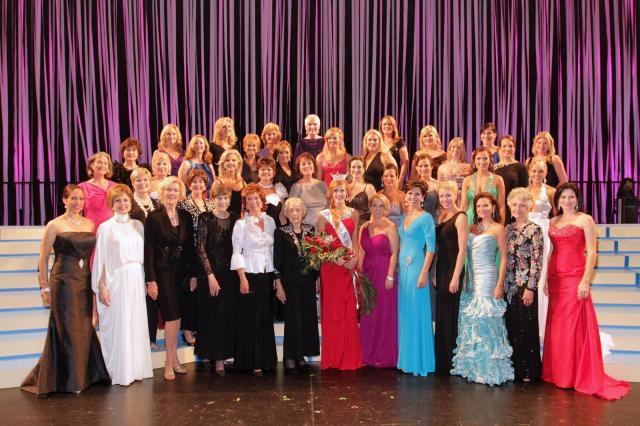
- Former Miss North Carolina titleholders at the 75th anniversary celebration
- Formation: 1937
- Type: Beauty pageant
- Headquarters: Raleigh
- Location: North Carolina
- Members: Miss America
- Official language: English
- Leader: Susan Williams (Executive Director)
- Website: www.missnc.org

The Miss North Carolina competition selects the representative for the state of North Carolina to compete in the annual Miss America competition. The competition has been held in High Point, North Carolina since 2021 and was previously held in Raleigh every year since 1978. Prior to that, it was held in various locales including Charlotte, Greensboro, Winston-Salem, Durham, Burlington, Wilmington, and Morehead City.

Lauryn Mallard of Advance was crowned Miss North Carolina on June 27, 2026, at the High Point Theatre in High Point, North Carolina. She competed for the title of Miss America 2027 on September 6, 2026, at the Kravis Center for the Performing Arts in West Palm Beach, Florida.

== 75th anniversary ==
The Miss North Carolina pageant celebrated its 75th anniversary in 2012. For pageant week, all living former Miss North Carolina titleholders were invited back for a reunion. The "Miss North Carolina Sisterhood" sponsored a special gala the night before the pageant on June 22, 2012. This was highlighted with a special exhibit at the North Carolina Museum of History and 43 former Miss North Carolinas (the oldest being Miss North Carolina 1946, Trudy Riley Kearny) coming to the week's events, including Miss America 1962, Maria Fletcher. In addition, all of the former titleholders were invited for a special honorary luncheon at the North Carolina Executive Mansion, the first luncheon held there since the 1960s. This also marked the first time in 17 years that the pageant has been televised throughout the state. It was televised on the special events channel of Time Warner Cable.

== Gallery of past titleholders ==
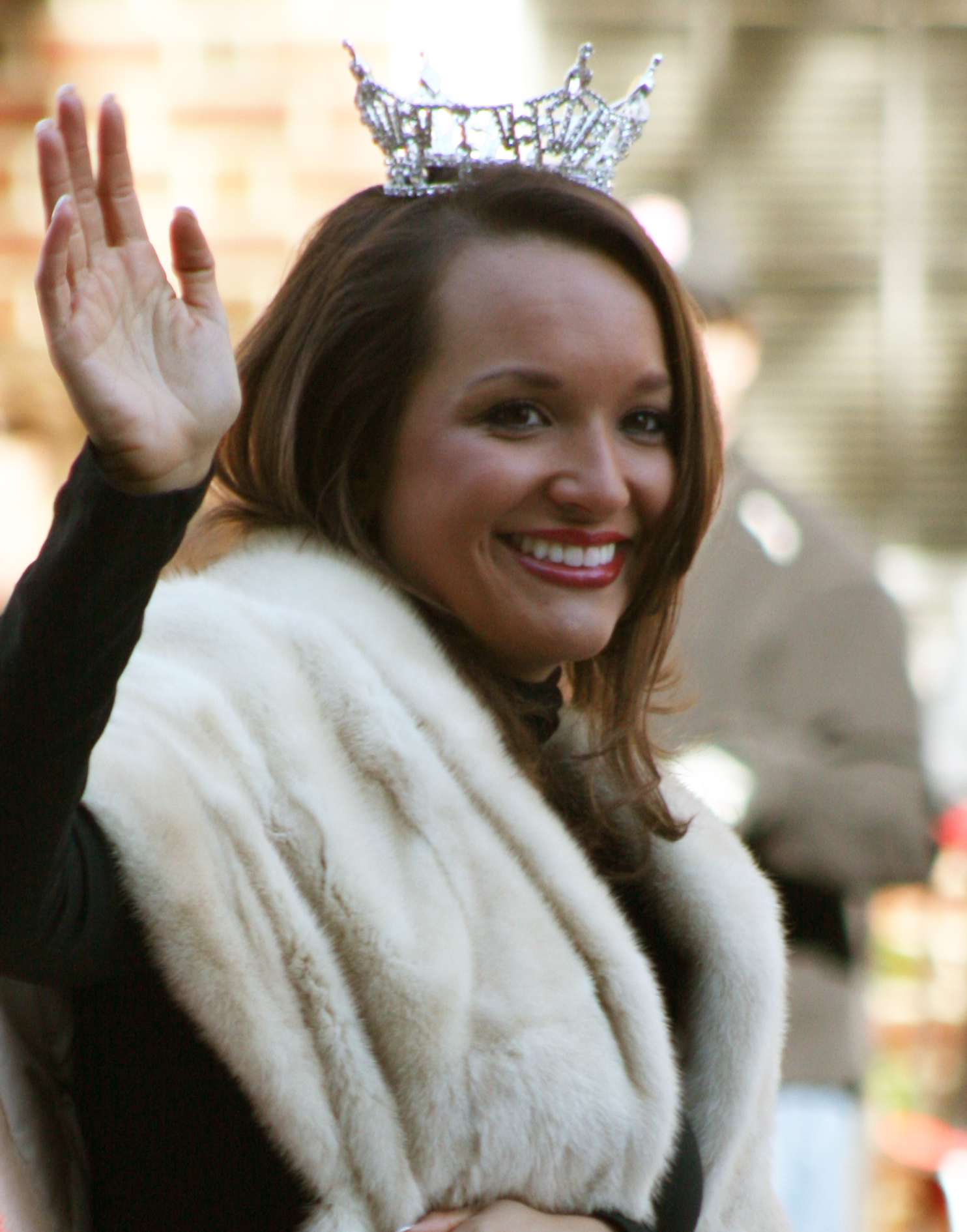
Jessica Jacobs,
Miss North Carolina 2007

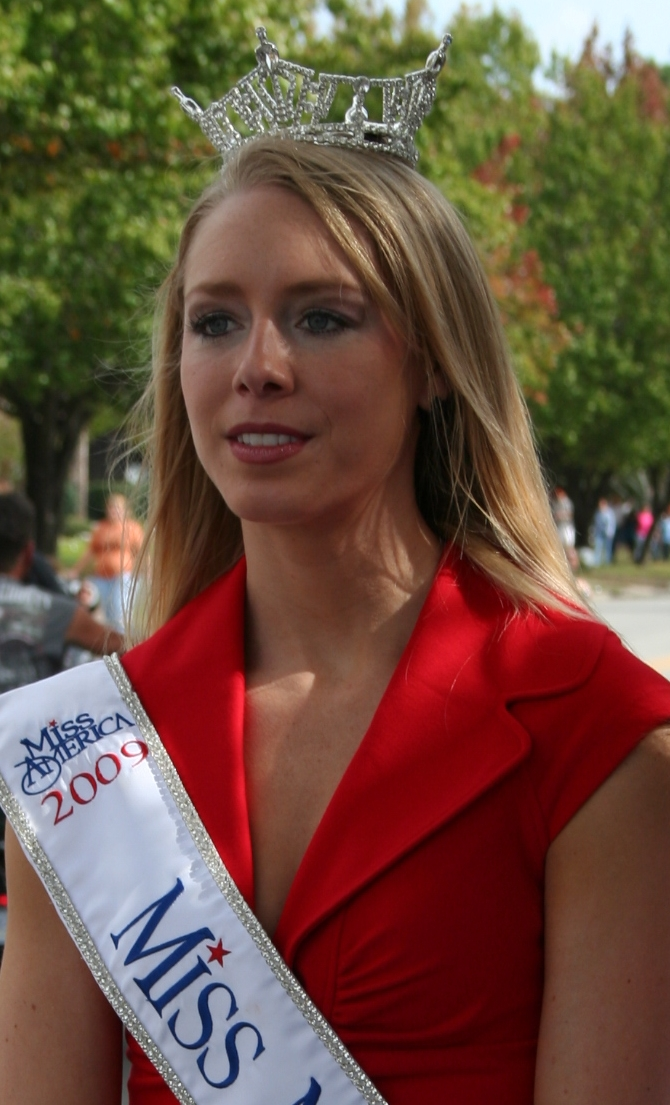
Katherine Southard,
Miss North Carolina 2009

== Results summary ==
The following is a visual summary of the past results of Miss North Carolina titleholders at the national Miss America pageants/competitions. The year in parentheses indicates the year of the national competition during which a placement and/or award was garnered, not the year attached to the contestant's state title.

=== Placements ===
- Miss Americas: Maria Fletcher (1962)
- 1st runners-up: Constance Dorn (1973), Susan Lawrence (1976), Michelle Warren (1998), Kelli Bradshaw (1999)
- 2nd runners-up: Ruth Covington (1937), Lu Long Ogburn (1952), Ann Herring (1961), Kirstin Elrod (2005)
- 3rd runners-up: Clara Faye Arnold (1956)
- 4th runners-up: Joey Augusta Paxton (1941), Betty Evans (1959), Jessica Jacobs (2008)
- Top 10: Elaine Herndon (1958), Jennifer Smith (1992)
- Top 11: Taylor Loyd (2024)
- Top 13: Dorothy Johnson (1945)
- Top 15: Margaret Wood (1939), Misty Clymer (2003), Hailey Best (2012), Alexandra Badgett (2020)
- Top 16: Betty Hunneycutt (1937), Carolyn Edwards (1951)

=== Awards ===
==== Preliminary awards ====
- Preliminary Lifestyle and Fitness: Joey Augusta Paxton (1941), Lu Long Ogburn (1952), Clara Faye Arnold (1956), Elaine Herndon (1958), Betty Evans (1959), Maria Fletcher (1962), Monta Maki (1980), Elizabeth Williams (1983), Kelli Bradshaw (1999)
- Preliminary Talent: Margaret Wood (1939), Joey Augusta Paxton (1941), Lu Long Ogburn (1952), Scarlet Morgan (1991), Lisa Bamford (1996), Michelle Warren (1998), Adrienne Core (2011), Taylor Loyd (2024)

==== Non-finalist awards ====
- Non-finalist Talent: Sarah Stedman (1968), Elise Annette Johnson (1969), Patricia Johnson (1970), Cornelia Lerner (1971), Susan Griffin (1975), Deborah Shook (1979), Janet Ward Black (1981), Lynn Williford (1982), Elizabeth Williams (1983), Scarlet Morgan (1991), Dana Stephenson (1995), Lisa Bamford (1996), Jennifer Roberts (1997), Lorna McNeil (2001), Adrienne Core (2011), Arlie Honeycutt (2013), Beth Stovall (2015), McKenzie Faggart (2017)

==== Other awards ====
- Miss Congeniality: Jeanne Swanner (1964)
- Children's Miracle Network (CMN) Miracle Maker Award: Hailey Best (2012)
- Children's Miracle Network (CMN) Miracle Maker Award 1st runners-up: Victoria Huggins (2018), Alexandra Badgett (2020)
- Duke of Edinburgh Bronze Medalists: Hailey Best (2012), Arlie Honeycutt (2013)
- Equity & Justice Scholarship Award Winners: Alexandra Badgett (2020)
- Quality of Life Award 1st runners-up: Heidi Sue Williams (1993)
- Quality of Life Award 2nd runners-up: Dana Reason (2004)
- Quality of Life Award Finalists: Amanda Watson (2009)
- Top Fundraiser 2nd runner-up: Carli Batson (2022)

== Winners ==
- Declared as winner
- Ended as a runner-up
- Ended as a finalist or semi-finalist

Year	Name	Hometown	Age	Local Title	Miss America Talent	Placement at Miss America	Special scholarships at Miss America	Community Service Initiative	Notes
2026	Lauryn Mallard	Advance	26	Miss Charlotte	Lyrical Dance			Fight with Grace	
2025	Sophia Kellstrom	Kings Mountain	26	Miss Davidson County	Vocal, "I'd Rather Go Blind" by Etta James			Make a Change: Fighting Food Insecurity	At Miss NC, won evening gown preliminary, tied for talent preliminary
2024	Helen Carrie Everett	Auburn, Washington	20	Miss Johnston County	Vocal, "The Impossible Dream"		Preliminary Talent Award	We Need Equity to Build Community	Helen Carrie Everett died at age 22 on April 5, 2026 of signet ring cell carcinomain cancer in Auburn, Washington.At Miss NC, won talent preliminary, evening gown preliminary, overall rookie award
2023	Taylor Loyd	Mooresville	22	Miss Statesville	Opera performance, "Amour, ranime mon courage" (The Poison Aria) from C. Gounod's Romeo et Juliette	Top 10	Preliminary Talent Award	The Arts Connection: arts advocacy, education, & accessibility	At Miss NC, won talent preliminary, evening gown preliminary, overall rookie award
2022	Karolyn Martin	Charlotte	22	Miss Metrolina	Vocal, "This is the Moment" from the musical Jekyll and Hyde			SelfKare: Eat to Success	At Miss NC, won evening gown preliminary
2021	Carli Batson	Wilmington	21	Miss Cleveland	Dance, Lyrical en pointe to "The Impossible Dream."		Top Fundraiser 3rd Place	CarolinaCares: supporting arts communities	At Miss NC, won talent preliminary, won evening gown preliminary
2019–20	Alexandra Badgett	Charlotte	22	Miss Jacksonville	Tap Dance, "This Is Me" by Keala Settle	Top 15	CMN Miracle Maker Award 1st runner-up Equity & Justice Scholarship Award	NiNE (No Is Not Enough): sexual assault prevention	Previously Miss North Carolina's Outstanding Teen 2012
2018	Laura Matrazzo	Chapel Hill	23	Miss Metrolina	Rhythm Tap Dance, "Are You Ready for a Miracle?"			Money Talks: Student-Focused Principles of Financial Management.	
2017	Victoria Huggins	St. Pauls	23	Miss Greater Sampson County	Vocal, "I Will Always Love You"		CMN Miracle Maker Award 1st runner-up	The ALZ Project for Alzheimer's Awareness	Former contestant on Star Search and American Idol Season 10
2016	McKenzie Faggart	Concord	21	Miss Mecklenburg County	Lyrical Dance, "Rise Up"		Non-finalist Talent Award	The S.A.F.E. Project (Support, Accept, Forgive, Evolve).	Previously Miss North Carolina's Outstanding Teen 2011; Top 15 at Miss America's Outstanding Teen 2012 pageant
2015	Kate Peacock	Dunn	19	Miss Dunn	Tap Dance, "Proud Mary"			Peeper Keepers: Pediatric Eye Disease Awareness	
2014	Beth Stovall	Goldsboro	20	Miss Greater Sampson County	Classical Vocal, "Chi Il Bel Sogno di Doretta" from La rondine		Non-finalist Talent Award	Inspiration Art: arts advocacy	
2013	Johna Edmonds	Lumberton	24	Miss Johnston County	Vocal, "Somewhere"			Readers to Leaders: Promoting Literacy in America's Youth	
2012	Arlie Honeycutt	Garner	19	Miss Kinston-Lenoir	Vocal, "Someone Like You" from Jekyll & Hyde		Duke of Edinburgh Bronze Medal Non-finalist Talent Award	The Domino Effect: volunteerism	
2011	Hailey Best	Goldsboro	21	Miss Durham	Operatic Vocal, "Art is Calling for Me" from The Enchantress by Victor Herbert	Top 15	CMN Miracle Maker Award Duke of Edinburgh Bronze Medal	The Live on Foundation: supporting children in foster care	
2010	Adrienne Core	Erwin	22	Miss Raleigh	Contemporary Clogging, "Soul Man"		Non-finalist Talent Award Preliminary Talent Award	The V Foundation for Cancer	
2009	Katherine Southard	Raleigh	23	Miss Raleigh	Ballet en pointe, "Fascinating Rhythm"			Scoliosis: Ahead of the Curve	
2008	Amanda Watson	Raleigh	21	Miss Garner	Vocal		Quality of Life Award Finalist	ALS Awareness	First Miss America contestant to choose ALS awareness as her platform
2007	Jessica Jacobs	High Point	23	Miss Central Carolina	Ballet en pointe, "Spring" from The Four Seasons	4th runner-up		Communities in Schools	
2006	Elizabeth Horton	High Point	22	Miss Carolina Coast	Operatic Vocal, "Je veux vivre" from Romeo and Juliet			Autism Awareness	
2005	Brooke Elizabeth McLaurin	Fayetteville	24	Miss Fayetteville	Vocal, "I'll Never Love This Way Again"			Brain Tumor Awareness	
2004	Kirstin Elrod	Cary	23	Miss Carolina Foothills	Semi-classical Vocal, "Love Is Where You Find It"	2nd runner-up		Counteracting Chemical and Substance Abuse	
2003	Dana Reason	Raleigh	24	Miss Greenville	Tap Dance, "Rock This Town"		Quality of Life Award 2nd runner up	Pediatric Cancer: Changing Lives One Child at a Time.	
2002	Misty Clymer	Raleigh	24	Miss Western Piedmont	Vocal, "Hold On" from The Secret Garden	Top 15			
2002	Rebekah Revels	St. Pauls		Miss Fayetteville	Vocal	Unable to compete; resigned following threat of release of intimate photographs; later attempted, through court action, to regain her right to compete in the Miss America pageant			
2001	Ashley House	Dallas	20	Miss Lincoln County	Celtic Irish Dance, "Feet of Flames"			Awareness and Management of Disabilities	Died on December 24, 2017, at the age of 37
2000	Lorna McNeill	Lumberton	24	Miss Topsail Island	Vocal, "Natural Woman"		Non-finalist Talent Award	Substance use prevention	
1999	Kelly Trogdon	Asheboro	23	Miss Western Piedmont	Vocal, "It's Time"			Birth Defects/Infant Mortality	
1998	Kelli Bradshaw	Spivey's Corner	22	Miss Western Piedmont	Ballet en Pointe, "PS 491" by John Tesh	1st runner-up	Preliminary Swimsuit Award	Basic Lifesaving Techniques Education	
1997	Michelle Warren	Gastonia	22	Miss Appalachian Valley	Vocal, "And I Am Telling You I'm Not Going"	1st runner-up	Preliminary Talent Award	Domestic Violence Prevention	
1996	Jennifer Roberts	Greensboro	21	Miss Thomasville	Tap Dance, "Devil With a Blue Dress On"		Non-finalist Talent Award		
1995	Lisa Bamford	Raleigh	21	Miss Garner	Classical Piano, Totentantz by Liszt		Non-finalist Talent Award Preliminary Talent Award		
1994	Dana Stephenson	Garner	20	Miss Garner	Classical Vocal, "Art is Calling for Me" from The Enchantress by Victor Herbert		Non-finalist Talent Award	CRUSADE: Fighting drug and alcohol abuse	
1993	Mary Susan Runion	Wilmington	24	Miss Spivey's Corner	Tap Dance, "Luck Be a Lady"				
1992	Heidi Sue Williams	Wade	23	Miss Fayetteville	Vocal, "Danny Boy"		Quality of Life Award 1st runner-up		Sister of Miss North Carolina Teen USA 1993, Wendy Williams
1991	Jennifer Smith	Mt. Airy	22	Miss Greater Raleigh	Semi-classical Vocal, "Half a Moment" from By Jeeves	Top 10		Arts Education	
1990	Scarlet Morgan	Pfafftown	22	Miss Forsyth County	Classical Vocal, "Vissi d'arte" from Tosca		Non-finalist Talent Award Preliminary Talent Award		
1989	Kelly Fletcher	Morganton	21	Miss High Country	Semi-classical Vocal, "Half a Moment"				
1988	Lee Beaman	Rocky Mount	20	Miss Henderson	Jazz en Pointe				
1987	Lori Boggs	Kannapolis	26	Miss Cabarrus County	Popular Vocal, "You Don't Have to Say You Love Me"				Previously Miss North Carolina USA 1980
1986	Karen Bloomquist	Durham	22	Miss Durham	Piano				
1985	Joni Parker	Fayetteville	24	Miss Fayetteville	Vocal, "The Shadow of Your Smile"				
1984	Francesca Adler	Fayetteville	23	Miss Fayetteville	Vocal, "Home"				Mother of Miss America's Outstanding Teen 2018, Jessica Baeder
1983	Deneen Graham	North Wilkesboro	19	Miss Elkin Valley	Jazz Dance, "Sing, Sing, Sing"				First African American Miss North Carolina
1982	Elizabeth Williams	Shelby	22	Miss Greater Greensboro	Semi-classical Vocal, "Climb Ev'ry Mountain" from The Sound of Music		Non-finalist Talent Award Preliminary Swimsuit Award		
1981	Lynn Williford	Wilmington	24	Miss Wilmington	Russian Character Dance, "Czardas"		Non-finalist Talent Award		
1980	Janet Ward Black	Kannapolis	21	Miss Charlotte-Mecklenburg	Classical Piano, "Revolutionary Étude" by Frédéric Chopin		Non-finalist Talent Award		Janet Ward Black died at the age of 66 on November 2, 2025 in Greensboro, North Carolina.
1979	Monta Maki	Hickory	23	Miss Hickory	Vocal, "You Light Up My Life"		Preliminary Swimsuit Award		
1978	Deborah Shook	Spruce Pine	21	Miss Spivey's Corner	Tap Dance, "Lover"		Non-finalist Talent Award		Gained national attention by kicking her crown across the stage the next to last night of her reign in a disagreement with pageant sponsors, Raleigh Jaycees
1977	Kathy Fleming	Hamptonville	22	Miss Appalachian State University	Popular Vocal, "Everything"				
1976	Susie Proffitt	Black Mountain	22	Miss Rutherford County	Tap Dance from Baby Face				
1975	Susan Lawrence	Thomasville	21	Miss Thomasville	Vocal, "You And I" from Goodbye, Mr. Chips	1st runner-up			
1974	Susan Griffin	High Point	22	Miss High Point	Semi-classical Vocal, "With a Song in My Heart"		Non-finalist Talent Award		Susan Griffin Fisher died at age 71 on January 27, 2024 in High Point, North Carolina.
1973	Heather Walker	Hendersonville	19	Miss Hendersonville	Popular Vocal, "The Other Man's Grass Is Always Greener"				
1972	Constance Dorn	Kinston	19	Miss Kinston	Ballet, "The Grand Holiday"	1st runner-up			Later Miss North Carolina USA 1975; 2nd runner-up at Miss USA 1975 pageant
1971	Patsy Wood	Benson	24	Miss Garner	Vocal, "I Believe it All"				
1970	Cornelia Lerner	Asheville	18	Miss Asheville	Piano, "Revolutionary Étude" by Chopin		Non-finalist Talent Award		
1969	Patricia Johnson	Winston-Salem	20	Miss Raleigh	Semi-classical vocal from Porgy and Bess		Non-finalist Talent Award		
1968	Elisa Annette Johnson	New Bern	19	Miss New Bern	Vocal, "As Long as He Needs Me" from Oliver!		Non-finalist Talent Award		
1967	Sarah Stedman	Asheboro	22	Miss Randolph County	Piano, Fantaisie-Impromptu		Non-finalist Talent Award		
1966	Nannette Minor	Charlotte	23	Miss Charlotte	Piano & Vocal				
1965	Penelope Clark	Sanford	19	Miss Sanford	Classical Ballet, "Robina"				
1964	Sharon Finch	Thomasville	20	Miss Thomasville	Vocal & Dance with Castanets				
1963	Jeanne Swanner	Graham	18	Miss Graham	Comedy Sketch & Ukulele		Miss Congeniality		Judge at Miss America pageants in 1990, 1994, and 2000 Jeanne Flinn Swanner Robertson died unexpectedly on August 21, 2021, at age 77.
1962	Janice Barron	Morganton	18	Miss Morganton	Piano, "Revolutionary Étude" by Chopin				
1961	Susan Woodall			Miss Roanoke Rapids		Did not compete; later assumed the title after Fletcher won Miss America 1962			
1961	Maria Fletcher	Asheville	19	Miss Asheville	Tap dance to recorded version of herself singing "Somebody Loves Me"	Winner	Preliminary Swimsuit Award		
1960	Ann Herring	Winston-Salem	19	Miss Winston-Salem	Vocal, "The Lonely Goatherd" from The Sound of Music	2nd runner-up			
1959	Judith Klipfel	Asheboro	18	Miss Randolph County	Vocal				
1958	Betty Evans	Greenville		Miss Greenville	Vocal, Piano, Skit, & Dance, "Wait till You See Her"	4th runner-up	Preliminary Swimsuit Award		
1957	Elaine Herndon	Durham		Miss Durham	Vocal & Dance	Top 10	Preliminary Swimsuit Award		
1956	Joan Melton	Albemarle		Miss Albemarle	Piano				
1955	Clara Faye Arnold	Raleigh		Miss Wake County	Monologue, "Sabrina Fair"	3rd runner-up	Preliminary Swimsuit Award		
1954	Betty Ring	Lexington		Miss Lexington	Dramatic Monologue, "The Sleepwalking Scene" from Macbeth				
1953	Barbara Crockett	Winston-Salem		Miss Winston-Salem	Vocal, "Shine"				
1952	Barbara Harris	Salisbury		Miss Salisbury	Classical Vocal, "Mon cœur s'ouvre à ta voix"				
1951	Lu Long Ogburn	Smithfield		Miss Smithfield	Piano, "Malagueña"	2nd runner-up	Preliminary Swimsuit Award Preliminary Talent Award		Lu Long Ogburn Medlin died at age 92 on April 5, 2025 in Smithfield, North Carolina.
1950	Carolyn Edwards	Leaksville		Miss Tri-City	Monologue, "Rumba" by Dorothy Parker	Top 16			
1949	Nancy Lee Yelverton	Rocky Mount		Miss Rocky Mount	Monologue, "A Delightful Dilemma"				
1948	Patsy Osborne	Lawndale		Miss Shelby	Vocal & Piano				
1947	Alice White	Fayetteville		Miss Fayetteville	Vocal, "That's My Desire"				
1946	Trudy Riley	Wilson		Miss Wilson					
1945	Dorothy Johnson	Winston-Salem		Miss Winston-Salem	Recitation, "I Am Old Glory"	Top 13			
1944	Betsy Marie Dalton	Winston-Salem		Miss Winston-Salem					
1943	No North Carolina representative at Miss America pageant								
1942	Hilda Taylor	Goldsboro		Miss Goldsboro					
1941	Joey Augusta Paxton	Charlotte	19	Miss Charlotte	Swing Vocal	4th runner-up	Preliminary Swimsuit Award Preliminary Talent Award		Joey Augusta Paxton of Hallandale Beach, Florida died at 79 on September 17, 2002.
1940	Jeanne Wofford	Forest City		Miss Forest City					
1939	Margaret Wood			Miss North Carolina	Vocal, "If I Didn't Care"	Top 15	Preliminary Talent Award		Multiple North Carolina representatives Contestants competed under local title at Miss America pageant
1939	Marguerite Elizabeth Taylor	Charlotte		Miss Charlotte				Marguerite Elizabeth Taylor Colina died at age 89 on October 4, 2009 in Charlotte, North Carolina.	Multiple North Carolina representatives Contestants competed under local title at Miss America pageant
1938	Rebecca Pearl Hankins	Charlotte	18	Miss Charlotte					No Miss North Carolina Competed as Miss Charlotte at Miss America pageant
1937	Ruth Covington			Miss North Carolina	Tap Dance, "Gonna Go"	2nd runner-up			Multiple North Carolina representatives Contestants competed under local title at Miss America pageant
1937	Betty Hunneycutt	Charlotte		Miss Charlotte		Top 16			Multiple North Carolina representatives Contestants competed under local title at Miss America pageant
1936	Thelma Perkins	Charlotte		Miss Charlotte					No Miss North Carolina Competed as Miss Charlotte at Miss America pageant
1935	No North Carolina representative at Miss America pageant								
1934	No national pageant was held								
1933	Leola Councilman		20		N/A				
1932	No national pageants were held								
1931	No national pageants were held								
1930	No national pageants were held								
1929	No national pageants were held								
1928	No national pageants were held								
1927	No North Carolina representative at Miss America pageant								
1926	No North Carolina representative at Miss America pageant								
1925	No North Carolina representative at Miss America pageant								
1924	No North Carolina representative at Miss America pageant								
1923	Rose Hildebrand	Asheville		Miss Asheville	N/A				No Miss North Carolina Competed as Miss Asheville at Miss America pageant
1922	No North Carolina representative at Miss America pageant								
1921	No North Carolina representative at Miss America pageant								
