= Miss Michigan =

Beauty pageant competition

- Formation: 1922; 104 years ago
- Type: Beauty pageant
- Headquarters: Muskegon
- Location: Michigan
- Members: Miss America
- Official language: English
- Website: Official website

The Miss Michigan competition is the pageant that selects the representative for the state of Michigan in the Miss America pageant. Michigan has won the Miss America crown on five occasions.

Grace Hanke of Hazel Park was crowned Miss Michigan on June 20, 2026, at Frauenthal Theatre in Muskegon. She competed for the title of Miss America 2027 on September 6, 2026, at the Kravis Center for the Performing Arts in West Palm Beach, Florida.

== Gallery of past titleholders ==
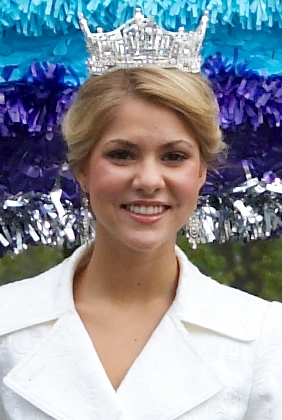
Kirsten Haglund
Miss Michigan 2007 and Miss America 2008

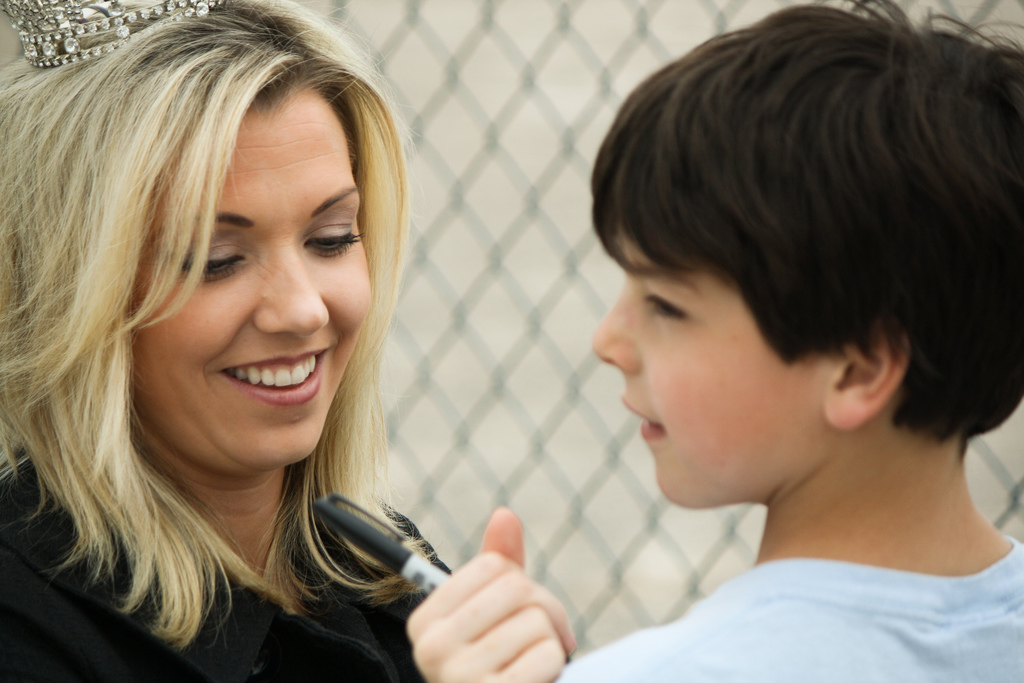
Ashlee Baracy,
Miss Michigan 2008

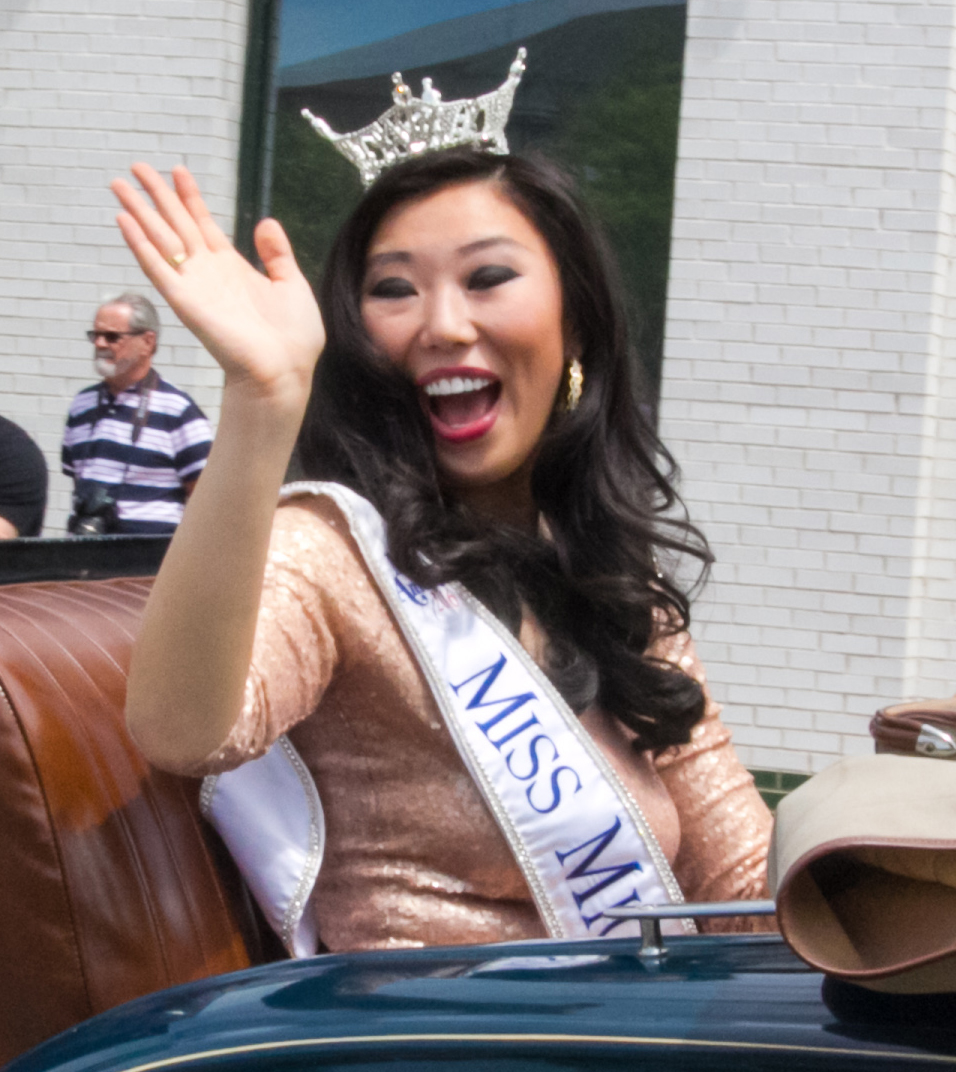
Arianna Quan,
Miss Michigan 2016

== Results summary ==
The following is a visual summary of the past results of Miss Michigan titleholders at the national Miss America pageants/competitions. The year in parentheses indicates the year of the national competition during which a placement and/or award was garnered, not the year attached to the contestant's state title.

=== Placements ===
- Miss Americas: Patricia Donnelly (1939), Nancy Fleming (1961), Pamela Eldred (1970), Kaye Lani Rae Rafko (1988), Kirsten Haglund (2008)
- 2nd runners-up: Monnie Drake (1940), Patricia Hill (1942)
- 3rd runners-up: Kelly Lynn Garver (1987)
- 4th runners-up: Janice Hutton Somers (1955)
- Top 10: Carole Van Valin (1963), Alecia Rae Masalkoski (1986), Che'vonne Burton (2001), Stacy Essebaggers (2002), Ashlee Baracy (2009)
- Top 12: Beverly Bennett (1944)
- Top 15: Jane Porter* (1925), Joyce Jean Hurd** (1926), Charlotte Jane Lowe*** (1927), Gerry Marcoux (1941), Doris Evelyn Johnson (1948), Dolores Jane Motter (1949), Madonna Kimberly Emond (2003)
- Top 18: Barbara Strand (1933)

Michigan holds a record of 23 placements at Miss America.

=== Awards ===
==== Preliminary awards ====
- Preliminary Lifestyle and Fitness: Nancy Fleming (1961), Carole Van Valin (1963), Kaye Lani Rae Rafko (1988), Kirsten Haglund (2008)
- Preliminary Talent: Monnie Drake (1940) (tie), Janice Hutton Somers (1955) (tie), Ann Penelope Marston (1960), Nancy Fleming (1961) (tie), Kelly Lynn Garver (1987), Nicole Blaszczyk (2010), Arianna Quan (2017), Maya Schuhknecht (2024)

==== Non-finalist awards ====
- Non-finalist Talent: Shirley Swanson (1957), Sarah Jane Noble (1965), Esther Lynne Smith (1966), Toni Jo Abbenante (1968), Linda Susan Kish (1972), Terri Cousino (1973), Bethany Wright (1980), Barbara Jean Crandall (1985), Sandra Kay Metiva (1992), Maria Malay Kamara (1995), Nicole Blaszczyk (2010), Arianna Quan (2017), Vivian Zhong (2021).

==== Other awards ====
- Miss Congeniality: Katie Lynn LaRoche (2011)
- Equity & Justice Scholarship Award Finalists: Mallory Rivard (2020)
- Evening Dress Award Second Prize: M. Beth Madson* (1922)
- Louanne Gamba Special Instrumentalist Award: Arianna Quan (2017)
- Miss America Scholar Award: Ashlee Baracy (2009)
- Private Interview Award: Mallory Rivard (2020)
- Quality of Life Award Winners: Katie Lynn LaRoche (2011), Haley Williams (2014)
- Quality of Life Award 1st runners-up: Stacey Gail Heisler (1994), Ashlee Baracy (2009)
- Quality of Life Award 2nd runners-up: Terri Sue Liford (1993), Elizabeth Wertenberger (2012)
- Quality of Life Award Finalist: Hannah Palmer (2025)
- STEM Scholarship Winner: Vivian Zhong (2022)

* Competed as Miss Detroit
** Competed as Miss Lansing
*** Competed as Miss Battle Creek

== Winners ==
- Declared as winner
- Ended as a runner-up
- Ended as a finalist or semi-finalist

Year	Name	Hometown	Age	Local Title	Miss America Talent	Placement at Miss America	Special scholarships at Miss America	Notes
2026	Grace Hanke	Hazel Park	19	Miss Oakland County	Vocal			
2025	Hannah Palmer	Brighton	24	Miss Spirit of the State	HER Story, "Your Dream Is Waiting"		Quality of Life Award Finalist	
2024	Jenae Lodewyk	Bay City	24	Miss Bay County	HerStory			Sister to Miss Michigan's Outstanding Teen 2016, Kendra Lodewyk
2023	Maya Schuhknecht	Buchanan	21	Miss Spirit of the State	Speed Painting		Preliminary Talent Award	
2022	Melissa Beyrand	Milford	22	Miss Oakland County	Violin, "The Final Countdown"			Electro-pop violinist with NUCLASSICA®. Third Miss Michigan NUCLASSICA® violinist.
2021	Vivian Zhong	Northville	24	Miss Spirit of the State	Piano		America's Choice Non-Finalist Talent Winner STEM Scholarship Winner	
2019–20	Mallory Rivard	Bay City	24	Miss Great Lakes Bay	Vocal		Equity & Justice Scholarship Award Finalist Private Interview Award	4th runner-up at Miss Michigan Teen USA 2012 competition 3rd runner-up at Miss Michigan Teen USA 2013 competition Retained title for an additional year due to COVID-19 pandemic
2018	Emily Sioma	Grass Lake	24	Miss Shoreline	Tap Dance, "Gotta Push On"			Made national news when she used her introduction during the Miss America telecast to highlight the ongoing Flint water crisis rather than state her academic credentials, by stating, "From the state with 84 percent of the U.S. fresh water, but none for its residents to drink..." 3rd runner-up at Miss Michigan USA 2020 pageant
2017	Heather Kendrick	Marysville	23	Miss Washtenaw County	Violin, "Bad Romance"			Appeared on America's Got Talent with electro-pop violin group, Nuclassica Second Miss Michigan NUCLASSICA violinist.
2016	Arianna Quan	Bloomfield Hills	23	Miss Wayne County	Classical Piano, "L’Ouette" by Glinka Balakirev		Louanne Gamba Special Instrumentalist Award Non-finalist Talent Award Preliminary Talent Award	
2015	Emily Kieliszewski	Alpena	23	Miss Stateline	Tap Dance, "U Can't Touch This" by MC Hammer			
2014	KT Maviglia	Dundee	21	Miss Washtenaw County	Dance, "Be Italian" from Nine			Diagnosed with sensorineural hearing loss aged nine
2013	Haley Williams	Saline	20	Miss Saginaw County	Baton Twirling, "Thunder" by Nuttin' But Stringz		Quality of Life Award	Previously Miss Michigan's Outstanding Teen 2009 Later named captain of the University of Alabama Crimsonettes
2012	Angela Christine Venditti	Shelby Township	25	Miss St. Clair Shores	Tap Dance, "Dirty Orchestra" by Black Violin			
2011	Elizabeth Wertenberger	Dundee	22	Miss Southwest	Dance, "Don't Stop Believin'"		Quality of Life Award 2nd runner-up	
2010	Katie Lynn LaRoche	Bay City	23	Miss Capital City	Contemporary Dance, "Calls Me Home"		Miss Congeniality Quality of Life Award	Contestant at National Sweetheart 2009 pageant
2009	Nicole Blaszczyk	Novi	22	Miss Wayne County	Lyrical Dance, "Lifetime"		Non-finalist Talent Award Preliminary Talent Award	
2008	Ashlee Baracy	Westland	23	Miss Wayne County	Jazz Dance	Top 10	Miss America Scholar Quality of Life Award 1st runner-up	1st runner-up at National Sweetheart 2007 pageant
2007	Gina Valo	Ann Arbor		Miss West Michigan	Fiddle	Did not compete; originally 1st runner-up, later assumed the title after Haglund won Miss America 2008		
2007	Gina Valo	Ann Arbor		Miss West Michigan	Fiddle			2nd runner-up at National Sweetheart 2006 pageant
2007	Kirsten Haglund	Farmington Hills	19	Miss Oakland County	Vocal, "Over the Rainbow"	Winner	Preliminary Swimsuit Award	Granddaughter of Miss Detroit 1944, Iora June Victor
2006	Angela Corsi	Farmington Hills	24	Miss Heart of Michigan	Contemporary Dance en Pointe, "Sway"			4th runner-up at National Sweetheart 2004 pageant 3rd runner-up at National Sweetheart 2005 pageant
2005	Octavia Reese	Detroit	23	Miss Wayne County	Cello, "Fuego"			
2004	Kelli Talicska	Auburn	24	Miss Kalamazoo County	Vocal, "All I Ask of You" from The Phantom of the Opera			Contestant at National Sweetheart 2003 pageant
2003	Madonna Kimberly Emond	Livonia	22	Miss Great Lakes	Jazz Dance, "On Broadway"	Top 15		3rd runner-up at National Sweetheart 2001 pageant Previously National Sweetheart 2002
2002	Erin Moss	Stevensville	21	Miss Southwest Michigan	Flute, "Riverdance"			
2001	Stacy Essebaggers	Whitehall	21	Miss Great Lakes	Clogging, Rhythm Of The Night (From "Moulin Rouge" Soundtrack)	Top 10		
2000	Che'vonne Burton	Detroit	18	Miss Redford Township	Vocal Medley, "This Can't Be Love" & "Almost Like Being in Love"	Top 10		Previously Miss Michigan Teen USA 1997
1999	Audrie Chernauckas	Livonia	23	Miss Redford Township	Ballet en Pointe, Medley from Titanic			Publicly condemned state legislators for "improper" spending of the state's $8.5 billion tobacco settlement on smoking causation programs Appeared in a 2011 episode of House Hunters with husband and young son Performed for The Rockettes and Siegfried and Roy
1998	Laura Welling	Livonia	23	Miss Washtenaw County	Gymnastic Dance, Selection from Jurassic Park			
1997	Kimberly Stec	Rochester	22	Miss Washtenaw County	Jazz Dance, "And I Am Telling You I'm Not Going"			
1996	Jennifer Lynn Drayton	Saginaw	22	Miss Great Lakes	Classical Piano, "Piano Sonata No. 23" by Beethoven			
1995	Coni Lyn Hull Sullivan	Jackson	23	Miss Redford Township	Vocal, "Half a Moment" from By Jeeves			
1994	Maria Malay Kamara	Zeeland	24	Miss Heart of Michigan	Classical Vocal, "Sempre libera" from La traviata		Non-finalist Talent Award	
1993	Stacey Gail Heisler	Livonia	23	Miss Great Lakes	Violin, "It Don't Mean a Thing (If It Ain't Got That Swing)"		Quality of Life Award 1st runner-up	
1992	Terri Sue Liford	Monroe	24	Miss Monroe County	Popular Vocal, "Only You"		Quality of Life Award 2nd runner-up	
1991	Sandra Kay Metiva	Saginaw	25	Miss Northern Michigan	Vocal, "Amazing Grace"		Non-finalist Talent Award	
1990	Victoria Lynn Fair	Jackson	21	Miss Jackson County	Classical Vocal, "Habanera"			
1989	Margaret Jan McIntyre	Monroe	24	Miss Monroe County	Ballet, Carmen			
1988	Krista Ann Blomgren	Livonia	22	Miss Heart of Michigan	Oboe, "Polovetsian Dances"			Top Ten Finalist - Grammy Educator Award, 7X Semi-Finalist - Grammy Educator Award, 2017 50 Most Influential Music Educators in the U.S., Pi Kappa Lamba, Guest Conductor, Band Adjudicator. 1989 International Spokesmodel for the Cultured Pearl Industry
1987	Melanie Ester Churella	Farmington Hills	24	Miss Farmington		Did not compete; originally first runner-up, later assumed the title after Rafko won Miss America 1988		
1987	Kaye Lani Rae Rafko	Monroe	23	Miss Monroe County	Hawaiian-Tahitian Dance	Winner	Preliminary Swimsuit Award	
1986	Kelly Lynn Garver	Farmington Hills	23	Miss Farmington	Fiddle Medley, "Orange Blossom Special" & "New Country"	3rd runner-up	Preliminary Talent Award	
1985	Alecia Rae Masalkoski	Muskegon	23	Miss Muskegon County	Karate Kata	Top 10		Holds a black belt in karate Later Miss Indiana USA 1987
1984	Barbara Jean Crandall	Lawrence	21	Miss Southwest Michigan	Ventriloquism, "Auctioneer's Song"		Non-finalist Talent Award	
1983	Denise Gehman	Waterford	20	Miss West Bloomfield	Vocal Medley, "Love Is a Many-Splendored Thing" & "Show Me" from My Fair Lady			
1982	Kathy Lou Pennington	Jackson	25	Miss Heart of Michigan	Vocal, "God Bless the Child"			
1981	Gwen Roberta Brown	Ishpeming	22	Miss Ishpeming	Dramatic Presentation of Original Writing, "Memory of Grandmother"			
1980	Heidi Hepler	Livonia	24	Miss Livonia	Classical Vocal, "Italian Street Song"			
1979	Bethany Jane Wright	Saginaw	19	Miss Saginaw	Vocal, "The Music and the Mirror" from A Chorus Line		Non-finalist Talent Award	
1978	Suzanne Schemm	Essexville	21	Miss Van Buren County	Vocal / Dance, "All That Jazz"			
1977	Holly Schmidt	Farmington Hills	18	Miss Farmington	Piano, "Doctor Gradus ad Parnassum"			
1976	Diane Kay Hansen	Berrien Center	23	Miss Southwest Michigan	Piano Medley, "My Country, 'Tis of Thee," "Dixie," & "Yankee Doodle"			
1975	Julie Ann Beckers	Allegan	18	Miss Allegan County	Dance & Speech, "Zarathustra"			
1974	Susan Lillian Short	Kalamazoo	23	Miss Heart of Michigan	Semi-classical Vocal, "Love Is Where You Find It"			
1973	Sherry Agnello	St. Clair Shores	19	Miss St. Clair Shores	Vocal, "I'd Rather Be Blue"			
1972	Terri Cousino	Erie	19	Miss Monroe County	Vocal, "How Can I Wait?"		Non-finalist Talent Award	
1971	Linda Susan Kish	Allen Park	19	Miss Taylor	Vocal, "As Long as He Needs Me"		Non-finalist Talent Award	
1970	Ginger Myers	Lincoln Park	21	Miss Ann Arbor	Vocal, "Wicked Man"			
1969	Sandra Gillespie	Hastings	20	Miss Michigan State University		Did not compete; later assumed the title after Eldred won Miss America 1970		
1969	Pamela Eldred	Birmingham	21	Miss Detroit	Ballet, "Love Theme" from Romeo & Juliet	Winner		
1968	Darlene Kurant	Muskegon	19	Miss Muskegon	Vocal, "I've Grown Accustomed to Her Face"			
1967	Toni Jo Abbenante	East Grand Rapids	19	Miss Michigan Junior College	Dramatic Reading, "Then You'll Remember Me" by Grace Atkinson		Non-finalist Talent Award	
1966	Nancy Ackert	Battle Creek	19	Miss Battle Creek	Vocal Medley from Annie Get Your Gun			Assumed title when original winner, Gayle Chancey, was disqualified prior to Miss America 1967 pageant
1965	Esther Lynne Smith	Portage	19	Miss Western Michigan University	Classical Vocal		Non-finalist Talent Award	Born Vlaardingen, Netherlands
1964	Sarah Jane Noble	East Lansing	18	Miss East Lansing	Free Exercise Routine		Non-finalist Talent Award	
1963	Kathleen McLaughlin	Ishpeming	22	Miss Upper Michigan	Dramatic Presentation, "Western Star" by Stephen Vincent Benét			
1962	Carole Van Valin	Roscommon	18	Miss Roscommon	Dramatic Reading, "Joe's Pal"	Top 10	Preliminary Swimsuit Award	
1961	Karen Southway	Wyoming	18	Miss Wyoming	Vocal, "Someone to Watch Over Me"			
1960	Donna Sheppard		18	Miss Dowagiac		Did not compete; later assumed the title after Fleming won Miss America 1961		
1960	Nancy Fleming	Montague	18	Miss White Lake	Presentation of Dress Design	Winner	Preliminary Swimsuit Award Preliminary Talent Award (tie)	
1959	Ann Penelope Marston	Wyandotte	21	Miss Detroit	Archery Demonstration		Preliminary Talent Award	
1958	Patience Joann Pierce	Detroit	23	Miss Detroit	Drama, "Meet Christobel"			
1957	Valerie Strong	Williamsburg		Miss Williamsburg	Piano, "Brazil"			
1956	Shirley Swanson	Muskegon		Miss Muskegon	Monologue		Non-finalist Talent Award	
1955	Margaret Devereaux	Howell		Miss Howell	Piano, "Flight of the Bumblebee"			
1954	Janice Hutton Somers	Lansing		Miss Lansing	Vocal, "You Made Me Love You"	4th runner-up	Preliminary Talent Award (tie)	Assumed the title after pageant officials reviewed the ballots and determined there was "an unusual pattern" in the judging
1954	Grace Dryovage	Garden City		Miss Michigan	4th runner-up Miss America			
1953	Velva Irene Robbins	Dowagiac		Miss Dowagiac	Speech, "Education"			
1952	Karol Dragomir	Benton Harbor		Miss Benton Harbor	Vocal, "I'll Walk Alone"			Previously married to actor, Peter Palmer
1951	Dolores Maria Berruezo	St. Clair Shores	19	Miss St. Clair Shores	Dance			First Latina Miss Michigan
1950	Bette Lou Pittman	Owosso		Miss Owosso	Monologue, "I Like Americans"			
1949	Dolores Jane Motter	Dearborn		Miss Dearborn	Ceramic Exhibition & Piano	Top 15		
1948	Doris Evelyn Johnson	Detroit		Miss Detroit	Vocal, "Worry, Worry, Worry"	Top 15		Multiple Michigan representatives Contestants competed under local title at Miss America pageant
1948	Linda Carroll	Grand Rapids		Miss Michigan	Impersonations of famous people			Multiple Michigan representatives Contestants competed under local title at Miss America pageant
1947	Jane Rose Foster	Detroit		Miss Detroit	Vocal, "My Dream Came True"			Multiple Michigan representatives Contestants competed under local title at Miss America pageant
1947	Peggy Ellsworth	Reed City		Miss Michigan	Vocal, "He's Funny That Way"			Multiple Michigan representatives Contestants competed under local title at Miss America pageant
1946	Constance Liddicoat	Detroit		Miss Detroit				Multiple Michigan representatives Contestants competed under local title at Miss America pageant
1946	Ruth Margaret Lenfestey	New Baltimore	20	Miss Michigan				Multiple Michigan representatives Contestants competed under local title at Miss America pageant
1945	Barbara Lee Smith	Detroit		Miss Detroit				Multiple Michigan representatives Contestants competed under local title at Miss America pageant
1945	Therese Mary Sullivan	Detroit		Miss Michigan				Multiple Michigan representatives Contestants competed under local title at Miss America pageant
1944	Iora June Victor	Detroit		Miss Detroit	Vocal, "Goodnight, Wherever You Are"			Grandmother of Miss Michigan 2007 and Miss America 2008, Kirsten Haglund
1944	Beverly Bennett	Detroit		Miss Michigan	Vocal, "Stormy Weather"	Top 12		Multiple Michigan representatives Contestants competed under local title at Miss America pageant
1943	Ruby Jean Telfer	Detroit		Miss Detroit				
1942	Patricia Hill	Detroit		Miss Detroit	Comedic Recitation	2nd runner-up		
1941	Gerry Marcoux	Detroit		Miss Detroit		Top 15		
1940	Monnie Drake	Detroit		Miss Detroit	Vocal, "Bill"	2nd runner-up	Preliminary Talent Award (tie)	
1939	Patricia Donnelly	Detroit	19	Miss Detroit	Vocal / Bass Fiddle, "To You" & "Ol' Man Mose"	Winner		
1938	Marjorie Jackson	Detroit		Miss Detroit				Competed under local title at national pageant
1937	No Michigan representative at Miss America pageant							
1936	June Ursula Forbes	Flint		Miss Flint				Competed under local title at national pageant
1935	No Michigan representative at Miss America pageant							
1934	No national pageant was held							
1933	Barbara Strand					Top 18		
1932	No national pageants were held							
1931	No national pageants were held							
1930	No national pageants were held							
1929	Loraine Budge McVey	Beaverton				N/A		No national Miss America pageant held
1928	No national pageant was held							
1927	Charlotte Jane Lowe			Miss Battle Creek	N/A	Top 15		Multiple Michigan representatives Competed under local title at national pageant
1927	Ruth Bushroe			Miss Flint	N/A			Multiple Michigan representatives Competed under local title at national pageant
1927	Florence Nina Clement			Miss Kalamazoo	N/A			Multiple Michigan representatives Competed under local title at national pageant
1927	Margherite Strang			Miss Lansing	N/A			Multiple Michigan representatives Competed under local title at national pageant
1927	Margaret Tinney			Miss Pontiac	N/A			Multiple Michigan representatives Competed under local title at national pageant
1927	Charlotte Elaine Bowman			Miss Saginaw	N/A			Multiple Michigan representatives Competed under local title at national pageant
1926	Gertrude Fisher			Miss Battle Creek	N/A			Multiple Michigan representatives Contestants competed under local title at Miss America pageant
1926	Ruth Mae Fowler			Miss Detroit	N/A			Multiple Michigan representatives Contestants competed under local title at Miss America pageant
1926	Joyce Jean Hurd			Miss Lansing	N/A	Top 15		Multiple Michigan representatives Contestants competed under local title at Miss America pageant
1925	Jane Porter			Miss Detroit	N/A	Top 15		Competed under local title at Miss America pageant
1924	No Michigan representative at Miss America pageant							
1923	M. Beth Madson	Detroit		Miss Detroit	N/A			Competed under local title at national pageant
1922	M. Beth Madson	Detroit		Miss Detroit	N/A		Evening Dress Award Second Prize	Competed under local title at national pageant
1921	No Michigan representative at Miss America pageant							
