= Miss America 1961 =

34th Miss America pageant

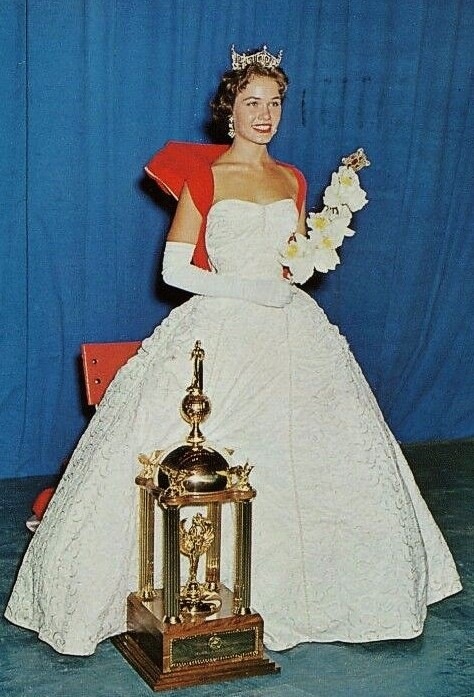
- Nancy Anne Fleming, Miss America 1961
- Date: September 10, 1960
- Presenters: Bert Parks
- Venue: Boardwalk Hall, Atlantic City, New Jersey
- Broadcaster: CBS
- Entrants: 54
- Placements: 10
- Winner: Nancy Fleming; Michigan

Miss America 1961, the 34th Miss America pageant, was held at the Boardwalk Hall in Atlantic City, New Jersey on September 10, 1960, on CBS.

The telecast was watched by a reported 85 million viewers. Nancy Fleming, the winner as Miss Michigan, later became a television personality and the wife of Jim Lange, host of TV's The Dating Game.

== Results ==
=== Placements ===
Placement	Contestant
Miss America 1961	Michigan – Nancy Fleming
1st Runner-Up	California – Suzanne Marie Reamo
2nd Runner-Up	North Carolina – Ann Farrington Herring
3rd Runner-Up	District of Columbia – Ruth Rea
4th Runner-Up	Indiana – Tommye Lou Glaze
Top 10	Alabama – Teresa Rinaldi; Idaho – Marlene Rae Coleman; Massachusetts – Brenda Corvo; South Carolina – Edith Sandra Browning; Utah – Marian Faye Walker

=== Top 10 ===
1. Alabama
2. California
3. District of Columbia
4. Idaho
5. Indiana
6. Massachusetts
7. Michigan
8. North Carolina
9. South Carolina
10. Utah

=== Top 5 ===
1. California
2. District of Columbia
3. Indiana
4. Michigan
5. North Carolina

=== Awards ===
==== Preliminary awards ====
Award	Contestant
Lifestyle and Fitness	District of Columbia – Ruth Rea; Michigan – Nancy Fleming; South Carolina – Edith Sandra Browning
Talent	Alabama – Teresa Rinaldi (tie); Michigan – Nancy Fleming (tie); Indiana – Tommye Lou Glaze; Utah – Marian Faye Walker

=== Other awards ===
Award	Contestant
Miss Congeniality	New York – Susan Jane Talbert
Non-finalist Talent	Canada – Iris Elaine Thurwell; Chicago – Margaret McDowell; Illinois – Vicky Joyce Nutter; Maine – Sally Ann Robinson; Mississippi – Patricia McRaney; Oregon – Rosemary Doolen; Texas – Mary Cage Moore

== Contestants ==
State	Name	Hometown	Age	Talent	Placement	Awards	Notes
Alabama	Teresa Rinaldi	Birmingham	21	Vocal, "Addio" from La bohème	Top 10	Preliminary Talent Award	
Alaska	June Bowdish	Anchorage	22	Dramatic Monologue from St. Joan			
Arizona	Georgia Garbarino	Flagstaff	18	Modern Dance, "An American in Paris"			
Arkansas	Claudette Smith	Star City	18	Vocal			Mother of Miss Arkansas 1991, Heather Hunnicut
California	Suzanne Reamo	La Mesa	20	Vocal, "Love is Where You Find it"	1st runner-up		
Canada	Iris Elaine Thurwell	Northtown		Vocal		Non-finalist Talent Award	
Chicago	Margaret McDowell	Evanston	21	Dramatic Reading		Non-finalist Talent Award	
Colorado	Anne Walker	Littleton	18	Dance			
Connecticut	Wendy Mitchell	New Haven	18	Vocal, "Just in Time"			
Delaware	Deborah Dunkenfield Benoit	Wilmington	21	Composite Expression of Special Training			
(Washington, D.C.) District of Columbia	Ruth Rea	Chevy Chase, MD	18	Vocal, "A Little Brains, A Little Talent" from Damn Yankees	3rd runner-up	Preliminary Lifestyle & Fitness Award	
Florida	Kathy Magda	Fort Lauderdale	19	Dramatic Monologue from Our Town			
(Georgia (U.S. state)) Georgia	Sandra Tally	Homerville	18	Piano, "Deep Purple"			
Hawaii	Gabriella Haleakala'l	Honolulu	20	Hula			
Idaho	Marlene Coleman	Pocatello	18	Vocal, "If I Were on the Stage"	Top 10		Contracted laryngitis and was unable to perform her talent during the national telecast
Illinois	Vicky Joyce Nutter	Vandalia	18	Presentation of Fashion Designs		Non-finalist Talent Award	
Indiana	Tommye Glaze	Culver	21	Classical Vocal, "Una Voce Poco Fa" from The Barber of Seville	4th runner-up	Preliminary Talent Award	
Iowa	Sally Neville	Davenport	18	Dramatic Reading, "Mother on a Moment's Notice"			
Kansas	Gayla Leigh Shoemake	El Dorado	19	Original Dramatic Interpretation, "Rude Awakening"			
Kentucky	Alice Chumbley	Jamestown	21	Dramatic Monologue from The Country Girl			
Louisiana	Judith Ann Coday	Baton Rouge	20	Vocal			
Maine	Sally Ann Robinson	Enfield	20	Monologue/Piano		Non-finalist Talent Award	
Maryland	Robin Carole Davis	Hyattsville	18	Vocal, "I Cain't Say No"			
Massachusetts	Brenda Crovo	Reading	20	Vocal Medley, "Bill" & "Can't Help Lovin' Dat Man" from Show Boat	Top 10		
Michigan	Nancy Fleming	Montague	18	Presentation of Dress Design	Winner	Preliminary Lifestyle & Fitness Award Preliminary Talent Award	
Minnesota	Jean Elverum	Fairbault	22	Vocal, "Romany Life" from The Fortune Teller			
Mississippi	Patricia McRaney	McComb	20	Speech & Art Presentation		Non-finalist Talent Award	
Missouri	Dusene Vunovich	Kansas City	19	Vocal, "Honey Bun" from South Pacific			
Montana	Lois Marie Volkel	Missoula	18	Classical Vocal, "Voi lo Sapete" from Cavalleria rusticana			
Nebraska	Cheryl Ann Jacke	Shelton	18	Vocal			
Nevada	Nancy Bowen	McGill	19	Humorous Reading & Piano			
New Hampshire	Drina Bouchard	Rochester	18	Cha-cha-cha Interpretation			
New Jersey	Ann Barber	Westfield	18				
New Mexico	Carolyn Moore	Carlsbad	18	Caricature Drawing			
(New York (state)) New York	Susan Talbert	Ogdensburg	19	Dance		Miss Congeniality	
New York City	Sherrylyn Patecell	New York City					
North Carolina	Ann Herring	Winston-Salem	19	Vocal, "The Lonely Goatherd" from The Sound of Music	2nd runner-up		
North Dakota	Carol Olson	Fargo	21	Dramatic Monologue from Mary Stuart			
Ohio	Alice McClain	Marion	18	Vocal, "Summertime" & "I Got Plenty of Nothin'"			
Oklahoma	Donna Kay Creed	Enid	20	Vocal, "The Sound of Music"			
Oregon	Rosemary Doolen	Salem	19	Vocal, "A Heart That's Free"		Non-finalist Talent Award	
Pennsylvania	Priscilla Mae Hendricks	Shillington	19	Original Display of Art Work			
Rhode Island	Sally Saabye	Warwick	18	Piano/Pantomime			
South Carolina	Edith Sandra Browning	Greenwood	19	Comic Dance/Pantomime, "I Wish I Could Shimmy Like my Sister Kate"	Top 10	Preliminary Lifestyle & Fitness Award	
South Dakota	Janet Barber	Britton	18	Dramatic Interpretation, "Casual Approach to Violence"			
Tennessee	Jenny Thomas	Nashville	19	Modern Ballet, Porgy and Bess			
Texas	Mary Cage Moore	Laredo	18	Spanish Dance with music by Manuel de Falla		Non-finalist Talent Award	
Utah	Marian Faye Walker	Salt Lake City	27	Classical Vocal, "The Waltz Aria" from Mireille	Top 10	Preliminary Talent Award	
Vermont	Anne Masino	Randolph	18	Accordion, "China Boy"			
Virginia	Catherine Birch	Staunton	19	Classical Ballet			Later married magician John A. Daniel
(Washington (state)) Washington	Connie Hughes	Bellingham	18	Original Monologue			
West Virginia	Mary Hoback	Bluefield	18	Original Dramatic Reading			
Wisconsin	Karen Fahrenbach	Racine	21	Classical Ballet en Pointe, The Sleeping Beauty			
Wyoming	Sharon Luond	Cheyenne	18	Dramatic Monologue from Wingless Victory by Maxwell Anderson			
