= Jacquelyn Mayer =

American beauty pageant contestant

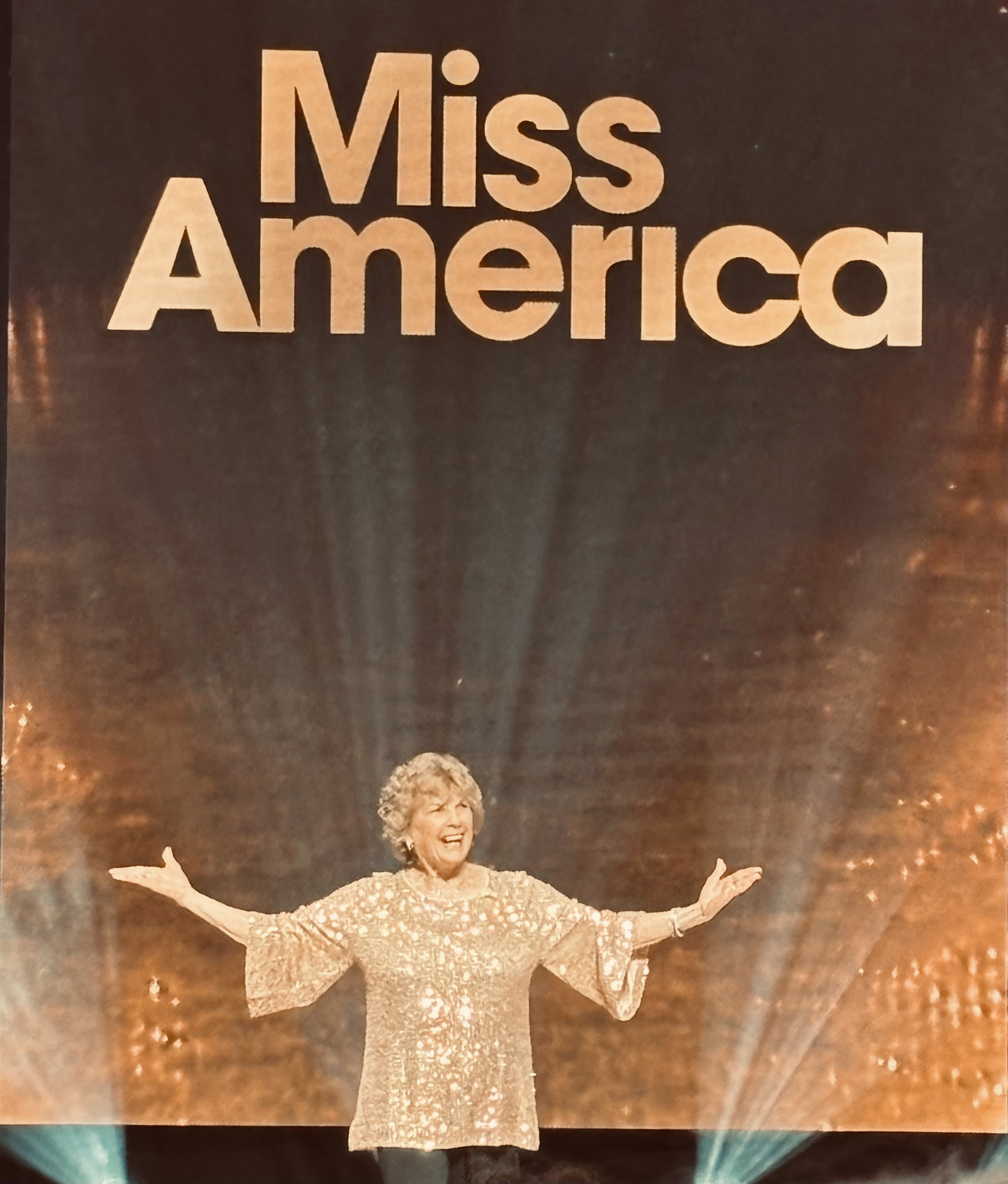
- Jacquelyn Mayer in 2025
- Born: August 20, 1942 (age 84); Sandusky, Ohio, U.S.
- Education: Northwestern University
- Occupations: Health care activist Motivational speaker Beauty pageant director
- Title: Miss Vacationland 1962; Miss Ohio 1962; Miss America 1963
- Predecessor: Maria Fletcher
- Successor: Donna Axum
- Spouse: John Townsend
- Children: 2

Jacquelyn Jeanne Mayer (born August 20, 1942) is an American actress and beauty queen who was crowned Miss Ohio 1962 and Miss America 1963 and currently travels the United States as a motivational speaker, noted for her recovery from a near-fatal stroke suffered at age 28.

== Early life and education ==
Mayer was raised in Sandusky, Ohio, and graduated Sandusky High School in 1960, spending much of her senior year in Austria as an exchange student, and then attended Northwestern University, where a friend encouraged her to enter the Miss America contest for the scholarship money offered to the winner.

== Pageantry ==
She was first crowned Miss Vacationland (representing her native Sandusky and Lake Erie Islands region) in 1962 - becoming the first ever winner of the crown, then went on to win the Miss Ohio pageant later that year. On September 8, 1962, at Atlantic City's Boardwalk Hall, she was crowned Miss America 1963.

Mayer is an executive director of the Miss Vacationland pageant.

== Health issues and activism ==
In 1970, Mayer suffered a stroke in the early hours following a Thanksgiving evening with her family. She was rushed to the hospital and though surviving, spent the next seven years in rehabilitation needing to re-learn such simple tasks as the alphabet and basic motor functions. Thirty years later, having regained the ability to walk and speak, Mayer considered herself 90% recovered. Firelands Regional Medical Center in Sandusky, formerly known as Providence Hospital, features the Jackie Mayer Rehab & Skilled Nursing Center.

For over 20 years, Mayer has dedicated her life to assisting stroke survivors and their families. She has been a spokeswoman for the American Heart Association, made educational films to raise stroke awareness, helped found the National Stroke Association, and has appeared on Good Morning America and The Phil Donahue Show, and her story has been featured in magazines such as People and Family Circle.

== Personal life ==
She married John Townsend and has two children, Bill Townsend, a technology entrepreneur, and Kelly Rostic, a former anchorwoman with NBC and Fox.

== Awards and honors ==
Beauty pageants

- Miss Vacationland 1962
- Miss Ohio 1962
- Miss America 1963

Halls of Fame

- Ohio Women's Hall of Fame inductee (class of 1997)

State/Local

- Section of State Route 2 running through Erie County named "Jackie Mayer Miss America Highway".

Other

- Honorary Doctorate Degree from Lourdes College

Awards and achievements
Preceded by Maria Fletcher	Miss America; 1963	Succeeded by Donna Axum
Preceded by Bonnie Gawronski	Miss Ohio; 1962	Succeeded by Darlene Depasquale
