= Bill Townsend =

American entrepreneur (born 1965)

Bill Townsend (born c. 1965) is an entrepreneur who helped launch several leading Internet companies including search engine Lycos, social networking site SixDegrees, now LinkedIn, GeoCities (sold to Yahoo!) and Deja.com (sold to Google and eBay). He is President & CEO of TRICCAR, Inc., a publicly-held bioceutical research and development company focused on pharmaceutical and bioceutical solutions to common diseases. He is also President & CEO of Ontheline Corporation, a next generation communications and digital lifestyle platform

== Education ==
Townsend earned an MBA from Baylor University's Hankamer School of Business where he held the John Schoen Entrepreneur-in-Residence chair and lectured on leadership and entrepreneurship. He earned his BA at The College of Wooster and studied at Washington & Jefferson College and SDA Bocconi.

== Career ==
Townsend has founded, co-founded or served on the executive management team or on the board of directors at several global biomedicine, nutraceutical, Internet, and technology companies. Most notably of these companies is TRICCAR, Inc., a bioceutical firm focused on bioceutical and pharmaceutical research, development, and marketing, where he serves as President and Chief Executive Officer as well as the Internet search engine company Lycos. Lycos was acquired by Terra Networks, the Internet arm of the Spanish telecommunications giant Telefónica for $12.5 billion.

Townsend served on the Board of Directors and oversaw the Marketplace division of the $2.8 billion Newegg company, the second largest pure-play e-commerce retailer behind Amazon. He oversaw the company's global marketplace division and its growth to over $280 million. Previously, he served on the boards of IAB, PacAirVentures, ReallyEasyInternet VOIP, and Futuristics.net.

== Philanthropy ==
In 2000, Townsend founded the Amati Foundation to help expand the stringed arts, specifically education in playing, making, and preserving the violin.

Townsend began studying violin making under the tutelage of Ziang Mei and William Hilton (a student of Vhakn Nigogosian), and Alberti Genduso (who has studied with the German masters Horst Kloss and Karl Roy, director of the Bavarian State School of Violin Making in Mittenwald, Germany). Townsend has made musical instruments for the likes of Martie Maguire of The Chicks and concert violinist Anne Akiko Meyers.

In 2005, he introduced a wood treatment system to increase sonority and harmonics in instrument making. This system, Il Cremonese Violin Treatments, matched the ground used by Antonio Stradivari on which to apply varnish and protect wood.

Townsend is the son of Jacquelyn Mayer, Miss America 1963. He contributes time and funding to women's issues, education and animal welfare causes.

== Politics ==
Townsend was the 1992 Republican nominee for United States Congress in Pennsylvania's 20th Congressional District, narrowly losing to Democratic incumbent Austin Murphy.
