= Miss America 1962 =

Pageant in the United States

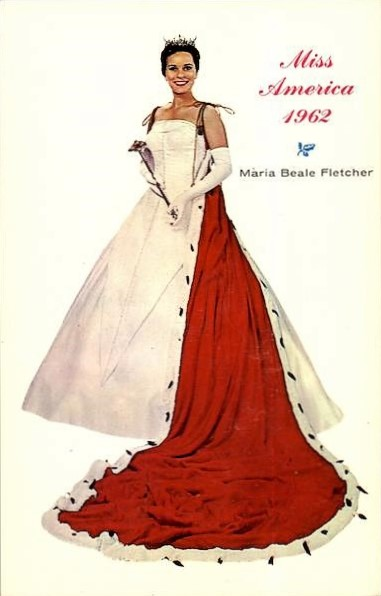
- Miss America 1962, Maria Beale Fletcher
- Date: September 9, 1961
- Presenters: Bert Parks
- Venue: Boardwalk Hall, Atlantic City, New Jersey
- Broadcaster: CBS
- Entrants: 55
- Placements: 10
- Winner: Maria Fletcher; North Carolina

Miss America 1962, the 35th Miss America pageant, was held at the Boardwalk Hall in Atlantic City, New Jersey on September 9, 1961, and was broadcast on CBS.

According to Nielsen ratings, the pageant is the highest rated Miss America telecast on record. It is also ranked among the top 100 television events of all time. Maria Fletcher became the first entry representing North Carolina to win the crown.

== Results ==
=== Placements ===
Placement	Contestant
Miss America 1962	North Carolina – Maria Fletcher
1st Runner-Up	Arkansas – Frances Jane Anderson
2nd Runner-Up	Utah – Carolyn DeAnn Lasater
3rd Runner-Up	Texas – Linda Jacklyn Loftis
4th Runner-Up	Minnesota – Nancee Ann Parkinson
Top 10	Alabama – Delores Hodgens; California – Susan Ann Henryson; Hawaii – Joan Whitney Vine; Montana – Joanna Katherine Lester; New Mexico – Myrtice Lee Conn

=== Top 10 ===
1. Alabama
2. Arkansas
3. California
4. Hawaii
5. Minnesota
6. Montana
7. New Mexico
8. North Carolina
9. Texas
10. Utah

=== Top 5 ===
1. Arkansas
2. Minnesota
3. North Carolina
4. Texas
5. Utah

=== Awards ===
==== Preliminary awards ====
Awards	Contestant
Lifestyle and Fitness	Arkansas - Frances Jane Anderson; Minnesota - Nancee Ann Parkinson; North Carolina - Maria Fletcher
Talent	California - Susan Ann Henryson; Texas - Linda Jacklyn Loftis; Utah - Carolyn Deann Lasater

=== Other awards ===
Awards	Contestant
Miss Congeniality	California - Susan Ann Henryson; Puerto Rico - Rosita Giusti Haito Rey
Non-finalist Talent	Delaware - Robin Jane Whemper; (Washington, D.C.) District of Columbia - Scarlett Shinault; Indiana - Kathleen Burke; Maine - Dawne Frances Christie; Puerto Rico - Rosita Giusti; Rhode Island - Cheryl Hirst

== Contestants ==
State	Name	Hometown	Age	Talent	Placement	Awards	Note
Alabama	Delores Hodgens	Bessemer	23	Classical Piano, "Hungarian Rhapsody No. 12"	Top 10		
Alaska	Jean Ann Holm	Fairbanks	19	Monologue with Modeling			
Arizona	Susan Webb	Prescott	19	Original Dramatic Composition, "My Heritage: The Stars"			
Arkansas	Frances Anderson	Pine Bluff	19	Vocal, "I Enjoy Being a Girl"	1st runner-up	Preliminary Lifestyle & Fitness Award	
California	Susan Henryson	Fresno	19	Vocal, "You've Got to See Momma Every Night"	Top 10	Preliminary Talent Award Miss Congeniality	
Canada	Connie Gail Feller	Ottawa	20				
Chicago	Nancy Kessler	Oak Park	18	Modern Dance			
Colorado	Jane McBurney	Denver	18	Piano, "Malagueña"			
Connecticut	Karen Sealise	Glastonbury	18	Sermon based on Sermon on the Mount			
Delaware	Robin Jane Whemper	Wilmington	18	Vocal & Dance, "That's What Makes Paris Paree" from April in Paris		Non-finalist Talent Award	
(Washington, D.C.) District of Columbia	Scarlett Shinault	Silver Spring, MD	20	Vocal, "I Cain't Say No"		Non-finalist Talent Award	
Florida	Sherry Grimes	Sarasota	18	Vocal, "My Man's Gone Now"			
(Georgia (U.S. state)) Georgia	Glenda Brunson	Savannah	18	Spanish Dance			
Hawaii	Joan Whitney Vine	Honolulu	18	Vocal Medley, "Ah! Je Veux Vivre" & "Thou Swell"	Top 10		
Idaho	LaVerda Garrison	Nampa	18	Dramatic Monologue, "The Yellow Wallpaper"			
Illinois	Jacqueline Bingert	Winthrop Harbor	21	Tap Dance & India Ink Sketching			
Indiana	Kathleen Burke	Terre Haute	18	Musical Monologue & Fashion Show		Non-finalist Talent Award	
Iowa	Patti Whalen	Clinton	18	Vocal Medley, "I Feel Pretty" & "Tonight" from West Side Story			
Kansas	Carolyn Jane Parkinson	Scott City	20	Musical Reading, "Hello Kansas"			
Kentucky	Lee Grigsby	Bardstown	18	Vocal, "Summertime"			
Louisiana	Lyndra Frances Pate	Shreveport	20	Vocal, "The House I Live in"			
Maine	Dawne Frances Christie	Gray	21	Piano, 'Hungarian Rhapsody No. 11"		Non-finalist Talent Award	
Maryland	Patricia Ann Moon	Bethesda	18	Modern Jazz Dance			
Massachusetts	Nona Smith	Fairhaven	18	Dramatic Reading			
Michigan	Karen Southway	Wyoming	18	Vocal, "Someone to Watch Over Me"			
Minnesota	Nancee Parkinson	West St. Paul	18	Modern Calypso Jazz Dance	4th runner-up	Preliminary Lifestyle & Fitness Award	
Mississippi	Annice Jernigan	New Albany	21	Piano Medley			
Missouri	Sarah Burns	Caruthersville	20	Vocal/Dance, "Put on a Happy Face" from Bye Bye Birdie			
Montana	Joanna Lester	Missoula	20	Vocal Medley, "Bewitched, Bothered, and Bewildered" & "There Once was a Man" from The Pajama Game	Top 10		
Nebraska	Nancy Lee Foreman	Albion	20	Dramatic Reading, "Such is Your Heritage"			
Nevada	Sherry Wagner	Reno	19	Tap Dance, "Oh Them Golden Slippers"			
New Hampshire	Annette Lambert	Claremont	18	Saxophone, "Valse Vanite" by Rudy Wiedoeft			
New Jersey	Marilyn Haufler	Watchung	18	Comedic Monologue			
New Mexico	Myrtice Conn	Clovis	21	Comedic Monologue, "Phonetic Punctuation" by Victor Borge	Top 10		
(New York (state)) New York	Kathryn Moden	Buffalo	20	Dramatic Reading from A Midsummer Night's Dream			
New York City	Maryann Hillyer	New York City	20	Vocal, "The Song is You"			
North Carolina	Maria Fletcher	Asheville	19	Tap Dance to a recorded version of herself singing "Somebody Loves Me"	Winner	Preliminary Lifestyle & Fitness Award	
North Dakota	Diane Ulvedal	Grand Forks	18	Piano, "Gavotte in B Major" by Bach			
Ohio	Darlene Depasquale	Dayton	18	Comedy Skit, "Betty at the Baseball Game"			
Oklahoma	Dana Darlene Reno	Stigler	20	Oration with Indian Sign Language			
Oregon	Jody Bourne	Salem	20	Interpretive Ballet			
Pennsylvania	E. Lynn Maloney	King of Prussia	20	Charcoal Drawing Display & Pantomime Routine			
Puerto Rico	Rosita Giusti					Non-finalist Talent Award Miss Congeniality	
Rhode Island	Cheryl Hirst	Greenville	18	Ventriloquism & Organ, "This Can't be Love"		Non-finalist Talent Award	
South Carolina	Janet McGee	Greenville	20	Vocal, "Ave Maria"			
South Dakota	Rejean Bowar	Faulkton	21	Piano, Vocal, & Narration of Original Monologue			
Tennessee	Rita Wilson	Humboldt	20	Vocal, "I'm Doing Alright for a Country Gal"			Previously National Sweetheart 1959
Texas	Linda Loftis	Fort Worth	19	Classical Vocal, "Sempre Libera" from La traviata	3rd runner-up	Preliminary Talent Award	
Utah	Carolyn DeAnn Lasater	Salt Lake City	19	Pantomime Dance, "My Life in a Day"	2nd runner-up	Preliminary Talent Award	
Vermont	Janice Cole	Binghamton, NY	18	Dramatic Reading from Romeo and Juliet			
Virginia	Charlotte Thomas	Roanoke	19	Piano, "Malagueńa"			
(Washington (state)) Washington	Gail Hannuk	Aberdeen	18	Piano, "Warsaw Concerto"			
West Virginia	Carole Johnson	Rivesville	21	Vocal & Dance, "Hey, Look Me Over" from Wildcat & "You Can't Get a Man with a Gun" from Annie Get Your Gun			Later Miss West Virginia World 1962
Wisconsin	Diane Anderson	Eau Claire	19	Violin & Ballet en Pointe, "The Swan"			
Wyoming	Mary Orr	Sheridan	19	Dramatic Reading, "The Bride"			
