= Kellye Cash =

American musician and model (born 1965)

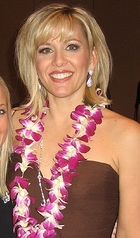
- Born: February 2, 1965 (age 61); Memphis, Tennessee, United States
- Occupation: Musician
- Title: Miss Milan Crown and Scepter 1986; Miss Tennessee 1986; Miss America 1987
- Predecessor: Susan Akin
- Successor: Kaye Lani Rae Rafko
- Spouse: Todd Sheppard (m. 1989)
- Children: 3
- Relatives: Johnny Cash (grand-uncle); Tommy Cash (grand-uncle); June Carter Cash (grand-aunt)
- Website: www.kellyecashmusic.com

Kellye Cash-Sheppard (born February 2, 1965) is an American musician and beauty pageant titleholder. She won Miss America in 1987.

== Early life ==
Cash was born in Memphis, Tennessee.

== Pageantry ==
Cash was crowned Miss Tennessee 1986 and later Miss America 1987, capturing preliminary honors in both the talent and swimsuit competitions.

== Career ==
Following her reign as Miss America, Cash toured with Bob Hope's USO Show and appeared on Late Night with David Letterman, The Today Show, Good Morning America, and others.

She has performed with numerous musical artists, including Vince Gill, Lee Greenwood, and Billy Joel, and appeared in regional theatrical productions. Cash was chosen for the role of country music legend Patsy Cline in Always...Patsy Cline. In 2003, from April to December, Cash played the role of "Narrator" in Joseph and the Amazing Technicolor Dreamcoat at the Mansion America Theatre in Branson, Missouri.

Cash has released six albums: four Christian and two country, including Living by the Word, and Real Life.

She has hosted and performed at several pageants over the years as well as other events, such as for the finals of 2007's Star Search.

=== Politics ===
An advocate for conservative political candidates and issues, Cash has twice been publicly elected to the State Executive Committee of the Tennessee Republican Party. She performed at an event for presidential candidate Pat Buchanan, held before the 1996 Republican National Convention.

== Personal life ==
Cash is the grand-niece of singers Johnny Cash, Tommy Cash and June Carter Cash. Cash married Todd Sheppard, a teacher, in 1989. The couple have three children.

Her daughter, Cassidy, competed for the title of Miss Tennessee in June 2014, placing in the top 16 finalists.

Her daughter, Tatum, was crowned Miss Virginia in June 2021. She competed for the title of "Miss America" in December 2021.

She appeared on Wonka's The Golden Ticket with her daughter Tatum.

Awards and achievements
Preceded by Susan Akin	Miss America; 1987	Succeeded by Kaye Lani Rae Rafko
Preceded by Sonja Pleasant	Miss Tennessee; 1986	Succeeded by Kris Beasley
