= Maria Fletcher =

Miss America 1962

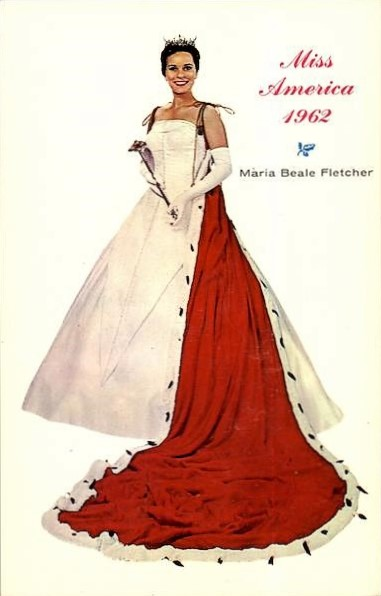
- Postcard of Fletcher as Miss America 1962
- Born: Maria Beale Fletcher; June 23, 1942 (age 84); Asheville, North Carolina, U.S.
- Education: Vanderbilt University
- Title: Miss Asheville 1961; Miss North Carolina 1961; Miss America 1962
- Predecessor: Nancy Fleming
- Successor: Jacquelyn Mayer
- Children: 2

Maria Beale Fletcher (born June 23, 1942) is an American beauty pageant contestant who was Miss America 1962.

== Early life and education ==
Fletcher was born to dancing duo Charles "Beale" and Margaret Gatley Fletcher, who were the founders of the Fletcher School of Dance and the Land of the Sky Civic Ballet. She has one brother, Walter, and two sisters, Margaret and Bonnie.

She is from Asheville, North Carolina, and was a graduate of A.C. Reynolds High School. She worked as a Radio City Music Hall Rockette prior to winning the Miss America crown. After winning Miss America, Fletcher used her earned scholarship towards a degree in French from Vanderbilt University.

== Pageantry ==
She was the Miss America preliminary competition swimsuit winner, and her overseas tour included visits to 31 Army hospitals and Servicemen's Clubs. For the talent competition, she tap danced to a recording of herself singing “Somebody Loves Me.” She remains as of 2025 the only Miss North Carolina to be crowned Miss America.

== Career ==
During the late 1960s, Fletcher served as co-host of The Noon Show on Nashville, Tennessee, television station WSM.

Awards and achievements
Preceded by Nancy Fleming	Miss America; 1962	Succeeded by Jacquelyn Mayer
Preceded by Ann Herring	Miss North Carolina; 1961	Succeeded by Susan Woodall
