= Kaye Lani Rae Rafko =

American nurse

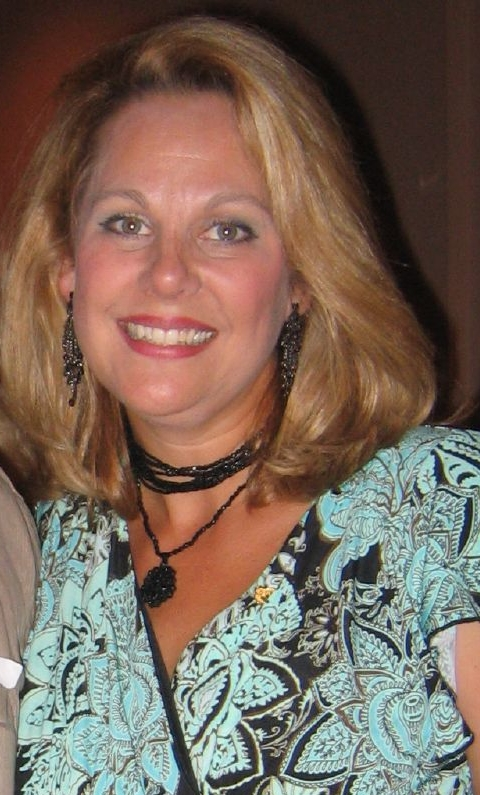
- Rafko in 2007
- Born: August 26, 1963 (age 63); Monroe, Michigan, United States
- Occupation: Nurse
- Title: Miss Monroe County 1987; Miss Michigan 1987; Miss America 1988
- Predecessor: Kellye Cash
- Successor: Gretchen Carlson
- Spouse: Charles Wilson
- Children: 4 (Note: One child is deceased.)

Kaye Lani Rae Wilson (née Rafko; born August 26, 1963) is the winner of the 1988 Miss America Pageant. She is from Monroe, Michigan, where a street is named for her.

== Biography ==
On September 19, 1987, Rafko was named Miss America 1988 after winning the 1987 Miss Michigan pageant. In the Miss America competition her platform included help for hospice services and her talent was Tahitian dancing. Rafko has participated in various fundraising activities and been a vocal advocate for nursing and hospice programs. She has addressed medical professional organizations around the world on the topic of nursing, including groups in Malaysia, Paris, Rome, and Singapore.

Rafko is a registered nurse and is married to Charles (Chuck) Wilson. They have three children.

Rafko co-hosts Only in Monroe, a monthly public-access television program, with Michelle Baumann. The show was taken over by Late Show host Stephen Colbert for the July 2015 episode, with Wilson and rapper Eminem as guests. Colbert returned as guest host on May 22, 2026, the day after his run hosting The Late Show ended.

Rafko appeared in the 1989 documentary Roger & Me.

Awards and achievements
Preceded by Kellye Cash	Miss America; 1988	Succeeded by Gretchen Carlson
Preceded by Kelly Garver	Miss Michigan; 1987	Succeeded by Melanie Churella
