= Nancy Fleming =

American beauty pageant titleholder

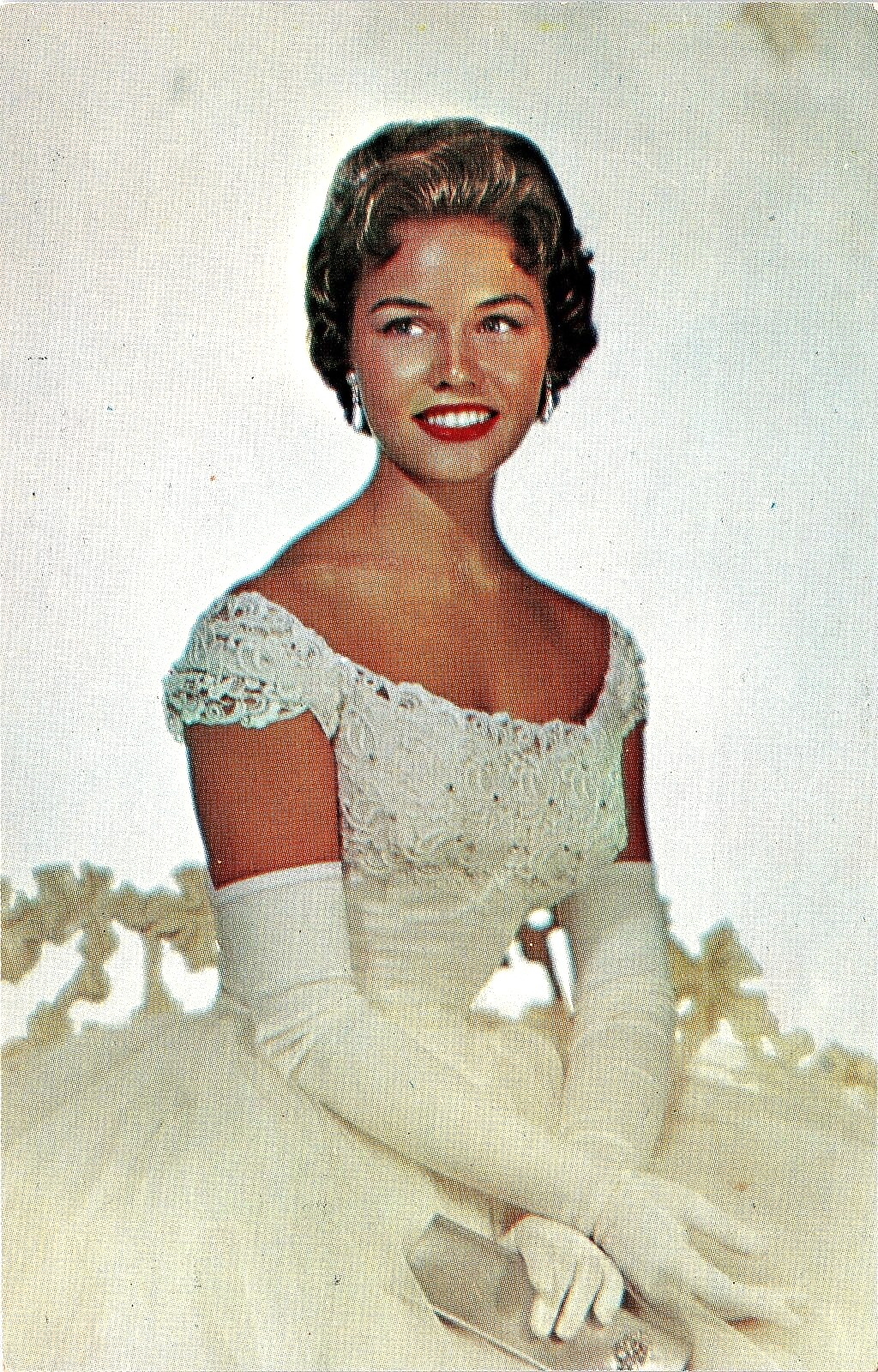
- Fleming as Miss Michigan in 1960
- Born: Nancy Anne Fleming; May 20, 1942 (age 84); Muskegon, Michigan
- Education: Michigan State University
- Title: Miss America 1961
- Predecessor: Lynda Lee Mead
- Successor: Maria Fletcher
- Spouses: William Frederic Johnson (m. 1963; div. 1973) Jim Lange (m. 1978; died 2014)
- Children: 2

Nancy Anne Fleming (born May 20, 1942) is an American beauty pageant titleholder who was crowned Miss America 1961 on September 10, 1960.

== Education ==
Fleming graduated from Michigan State University in 1964 and earned a teaching certificate from the University of California, Berkeley in 1966. She is listed as one of Michigan State University's "Accomplished Women Graduates." During her freshman year at MSU, she lived in West Landon Hall on the North Campus, a dormitory for women. Her time at the school was sometimes troubled. Later, she said, "I felt like a freak at MSU. I had just been on television three days before and I entered with a lot of fanfare. There was a lot of weirdness and rudeness. I was pointed out and stared at. It was really creepy."

== Pageantry ==
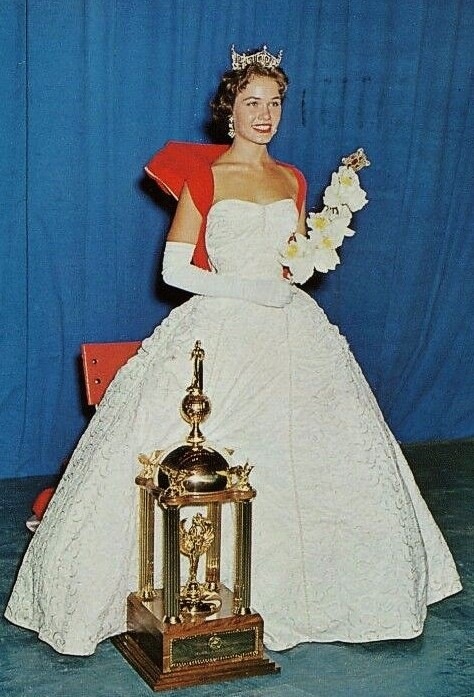
Fleming posing with the Miss America trophy in 1960

A native of Montague, Michigan, Fleming competed in the Miss America pageant as Miss Michigan. She competed in the Miss Michigan pageant as Miss White Lake.

== Career ==
Before entering show business, Fleming worked as an elementary school teacher.

She later worked in the entertainment industry, as a program host and interviewer for ABC-TV, Cable Health Network (now Lifetime) and PBS.

She appeared in an episode of The Love Boat in 1984, along with Jean Bartel, Miss America 1943; Marian McKnight, Miss America 1957; and Vanessa L. Williams, Miss America 1984.

== Personal life ==
Fleming's first husband was William Frederic Johnson. In 1978, Fleming married Jim Lange, a radio and television personality; their marriage lasted until his death in 2014. Fleming has two children from her first marriage: Ingrid and Steig. Fleming also has three stepchildren from her marriage to Lange: Nick, Romney, and Gavin.

Awards and achievements
Preceded by Lynda Lee Mead	Miss America; 1961	Succeeded by Maria Fletcher
Preceded by Ann Penelope Marston	Miss Michigan; 1960	Succeeded by Donna Sheppard Kickert
