= Mallory Hagan =

American politician (born 1988)

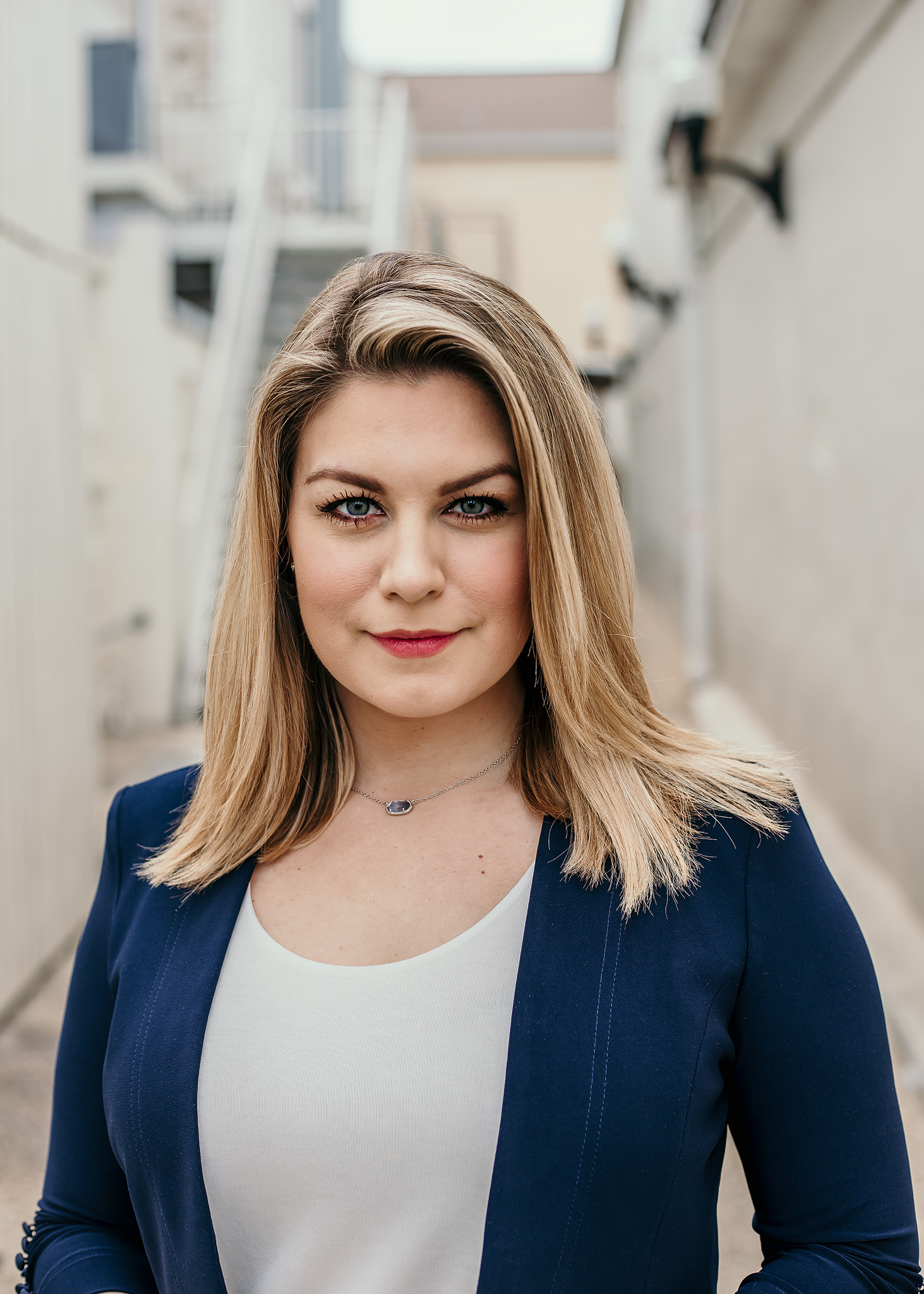
- Campaign portrait, 2018
- Born: Mallory Hytes Hagan; December 23, 1988 (age 37); Memphis, Tennessee, U.S.
- Education: Auburn University; Fashion Institute of Technology (BA)
- Occupation: Business consultant
- Known for: Miss America 2013; Candidate for Congress
- Height: 5 ft 7 in (1.70 m)
- Title: Miss Brooklyn 2010; Miss Manhattan 2011; Miss New York City 2012; Miss New York 2012; Miss America 2013
- Political party: Democratic
- Spouse: Kevin Stramara (m. 2024)
- Website: Official website

Mallory Hytes Hagan Stramara (born December 23, 1988) is an American former news anchor and beauty queen. She won Miss America 2013 as Miss New York 2012 and campaigned unsuccessfully for the House of Representatives in 2018.

Hagan moved to New York in 2008 after her first year of college at Auburn University in her native state Alabama. She became Miss New York's first runner-up in 2010 and 2011, before winning the Miss New York pageant in 2012 and subsequently the Miss America peagant in 2013. She won the competition on a platform for child sexual abuse awareness and prevention due to her family's history of child abuse. Following her win, she graduated from the Fashion Institute of Technology with a communications degree, returned to Alabama in 2016 and worked for WLTZ as a news anchor and reporter between 2016 and 2018.

She ran in the 2018 congressional election as a Democrat in Alabama's 3rd congressional district, which contains 14 counties and includes her hometown of Opelika, Alabama. After moving to Madison, Alabama, she ran for District 25 in the Alabama House of Representatives in the 2022 election.

== Early life and education ==
Hagan was born in Memphis, Tennessee, and was raised in Opelika, Alabama. She graduated from Opelika High School in 2007. Her parents were raised in Auburn, Alabama. She was influenced by her formative years spent with a mother who ran a dance studio in the Auburn-Opelika area, where she was raised. Her grandmother also ran a dance studio in Tennessee, where Hagan was born. She is a former student at Auburn University, where she spent a year studying biomedical science. She was a member of the sorority Pi Beta Phi Alabama Gamma chapter, becoming the fourth Pi Beta Phi to become Miss America (Marilyn Van Derbur, Jackie Mayer, and Susan Akin).

She moved to Brooklyn in October 2008. At the time of her arrival, she had less than $1000 and no job. Several sources stated that Hagan was a Park Slope resident when she won Miss America. The Wall Street Journal ran a correction, corroborated by The New York Times, that she was a resident of Windsor Terrace, Brooklyn at the time. Hagan had lived in six different Brooklyn neighborhoods between her arrival in 2008 and her Miss America victory in 2013, including Sunset Park and Williamsburg.

At the time of the 2013 Miss America competition, she was a Fashion Institute of Technology (FIT) student, where she studied advertising, marketing and communications with aspirations of a profession related to cosmetic and fragrance marketing. At FIT, she was a part of the Presidential Honors Program. She trained several different physical and mental methods to prepare for the pageant. Her fitness trainers included Richard Talens of the social fitness network Fitocracy, Sohee Lee, and Mark Fisher of Mark Fisher Fitness. One of her training elements was the CrossFit exercise program.

== Pageantry ==
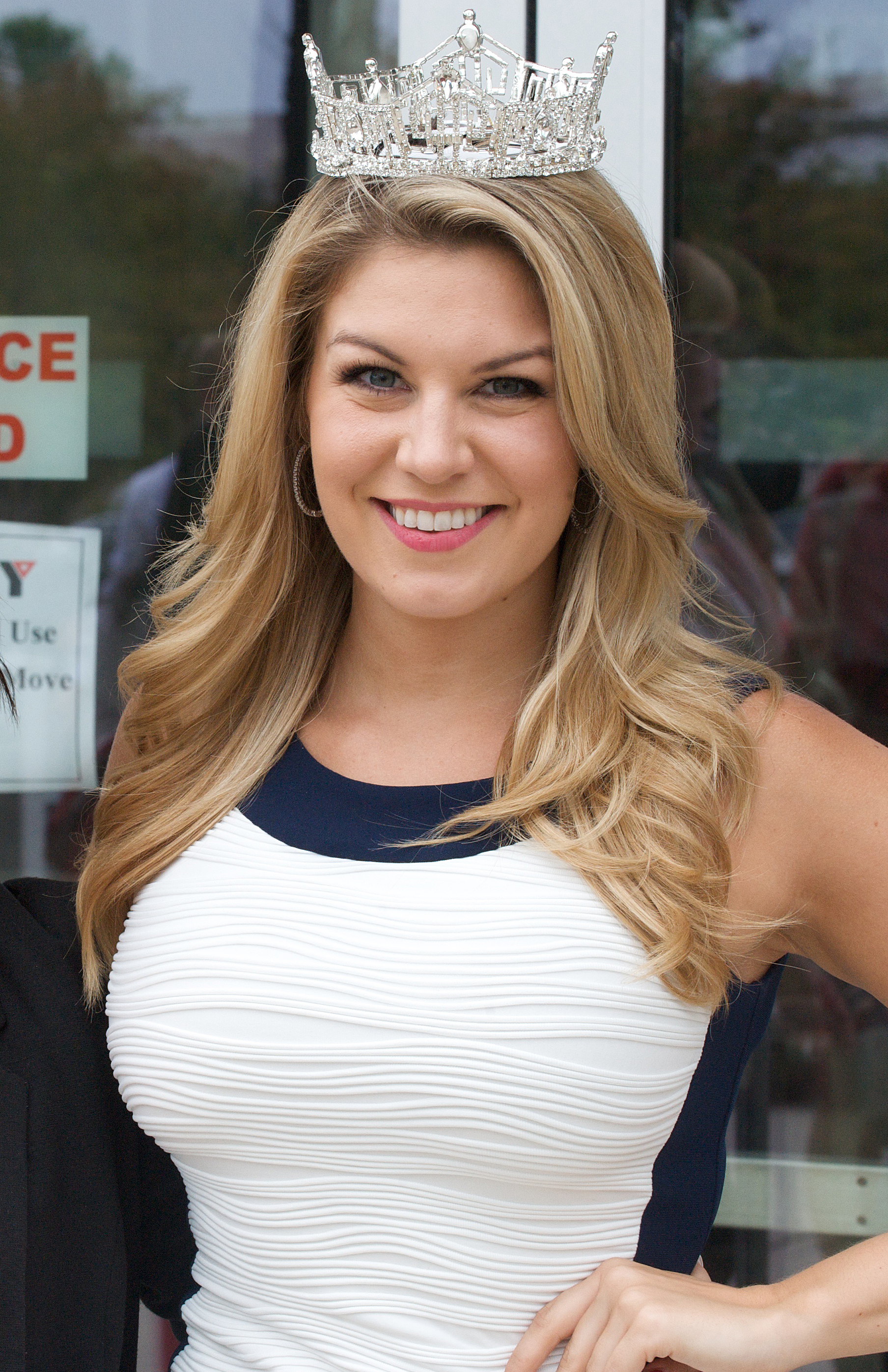
Hagan as Miss America 2013

=== Beginnings in Alabama and Miss New York ===
Hagan competed in the Miss Alabama's Outstanding Teen pageant from the ages of 13 to 17 and won the runner-up title once. In 2008 she made her only appearance in the Miss Alabama competition and won a non-finalist talent award and a scholarship, while studying at Auburn University, before she left her home for New York in the same year.

In New York Hagan first participated in the Miss Brooklyn 2010 pageant, wishing to win scholarship money for her education, and to her own surprise won the competition. This was followed up by titles as Miss Manhattan 2011, Miss New York City 2012, as well as two first runner-up finishes in the Miss New York pageant in 2010 and 2011, before winning the title of Miss New York in 2012 and qualifying for the Miss America pageant in her last eligible year at the age of 24. She received a $10,000 scholarship for her win. During her reign as Miss New York 2012, her platform was child sexual abuse awareness and prevention.

Her contest bio stated that "Hagan has chosen to honor the women in her family who have been victims of sexual abuse by sharing their personal stories and encouraging others to take a stand." According to statements made during an Associated Press interview, her mother, Mandy Moore, convinced her to tackle child sexual abuse since it had affected her mother, aunt, grandmother, and cousins. Hagan has stated that she has experienced the ripple effects of child sexual abuse.

=== 2013 Miss America pageant ===
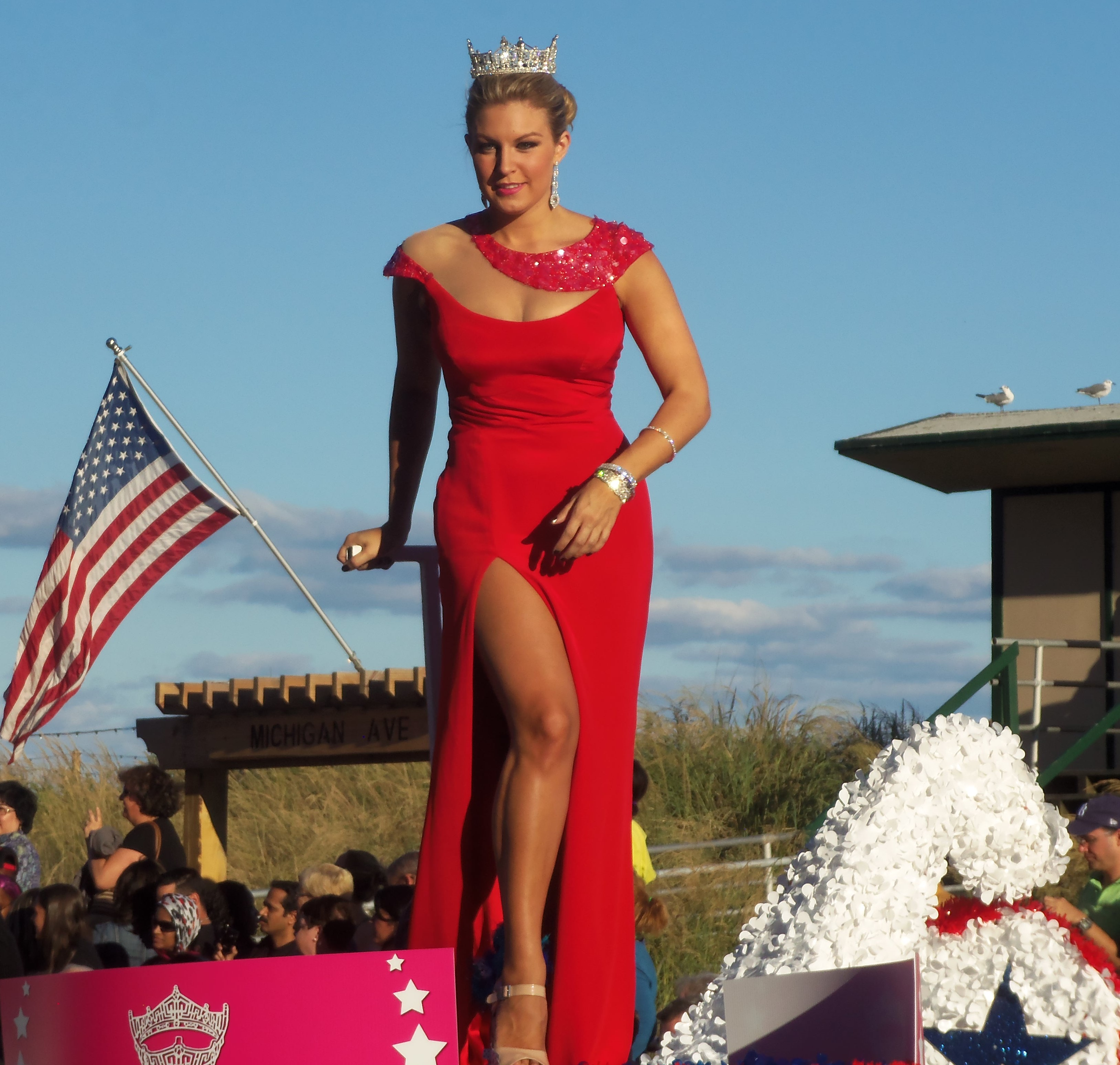
Hagan at the Show Us Your Shoes Parade, around the Miss America 2014 contest in September 2013

Hagan's introductory quip to the Miss America 2013 audience on January 12, 2013 in Las Vegas, Nevada at the beginning of the on-air broadcast was "Sandy may have swept away our shores but never our spirit." Other elements of her winning wardrobe included a black string bikini and an asymmetric white evening gown by Juan Carloa Pinera. She was crowned Miss America 2013 by outgoing Miss America 2012, Laura Kaeppeler, beating out first runner-up, Miss South Carolina 2012, Ali Rogers. Along with the title of Miss America, Hagan also won a $50,000 scholarship.

Hagan was the fourth Miss New York, second New York City resident, and first Brooklyn resident to serve as Miss America. Due to the decision to move the pageant back to Atlantic City, New Jersey, her reign was cut short by four months and ended on September 15, 2013.

As Miss America, Hagan claimed to travel 20,000 miles (32,187 km) per month. During her year, she lobbied with the National Children's Alliance to restore funding in the 2014 budget for Child Advocacy Centers across America, which she later said that she was "incredibly proud of". In addition, she worked with the International Center for Missing and Exploited Children, Safe Horizon, Stop it Now!, and Prevent Child Abuse America, and also gave a response on the issue of gun control in which she opposed fighting violence with violence. She was derided in the press for gaining weight a few months after becoming Miss America, leading to her becoming a proponent of body positivity.

=== Haskell controversy ===
In December 2017, the Huffington Post revealed that the pageant CEO Sam Haskell had sent a series of emails degrading former Miss Americas, including Hagan for her body weight. Hagan took to the media demanding Haskell and other members of the Miss America Board of Directors, including Tammy Haddad of Haddad Media and Miss America Phyllis George, resign. Hagan held a Facebook live stating "I am the storm" in reference to the leaders, such as Haskell, hoping that the "media storm" would blow over. She began a T-shirt line that now benefits the newly restructured Miss America Organization.

In January 2018, Hagan created a Change.org petition to demand, alongside other former Miss Americas, the resignation of Haskell. The Miss America Organization ultimately named Gretchen Carlson, a former news journalist and Miss America, the new Executive Chair of the Board of Directors along with appointing other former Miss Americas to the board, establishing a new leadership.

== Career ==
When she moved to New York, Hagan first worked there for a few years, before using the scholarship money she had won since 2010 to enroll at the Fashion Institute of Technology (FIT), where she earned a degree in Advertising, Marketing and Communications. After her reign as Miss America, she had shifted her interest from marketing to communication and television hosting and changed her major to communications. Following her graduation she moved to Los Angeles to pursue a television career. She later returned to New York City and started a personal branding business called "Define: Mind. Mission. Marketing." with Claire Buffie, Miss New York 2010 to work as a marketing consultant.

In August 2016, Hagan was hired as a reporter by WLTZ-TV, which is based in Columbus, Georgia, and reported from her home region East Alabama and the Columbus area. She was promoted to news anchor of the station's first evening news show WLTZ First News in April 2017 and worked in that position until February 2018, when she declared her congressional candidacy and moved back to her home town Opelika.

=== 2018 congressional run ===
Hagan ran for Alabama's 3rd congressional district in the 2018 congressional election as a Democrat, after she had been asked to do so by her fellow citizens. Hagan was endorsed by the Alabama New South Alliance, the Retail, Wholesale and Department Store Union, End Citizens United, Lilly Ledbetter, and received a "Gun Sense Candidate" distinction from Moms Demand Action. In the first quarter, Hagan raised over $100k for her congressional race. Her campaign was ultimately unsuccessful. She was defeated in the election by incumbent Mike Rogers. While Hagan had explained in a 2013 interview as Miss America that she could not imagine to ever go into politics, she now said after her candidacy that "running for office [was] the thing [she was] the single most proud of".

=== Post election ===
After the 2018 election, Hagan did marketing and social media work for the Miss America organization. She also served as communications director for Michael Bloomberg's presidential campaign in Alabama during the race for the 2020 Democratic presidential nomination. In 2020, she moved to Madison, Alabama, and became a communications manager for the Business Outreach Center Network, working with small business owners from underserved communities such as immigrants and women.

Hagan ran for a seat in the Alabama House of Representatives against sitting House Speaker Mac McCutcheon in District 25 in the 2022 election.

She now works at The Dance Company INC in Madison.

Awards and achievements
Preceded by Laura Kaeppeler	Miss America; 2012	Succeeded by Nina Davuluri
Preceded by Kaitlin Monte	Miss New York; 2012	Succeeded by Shannon Oliver
