= Nina Davuluri =

2014 Miss America beauty pageant titleholder

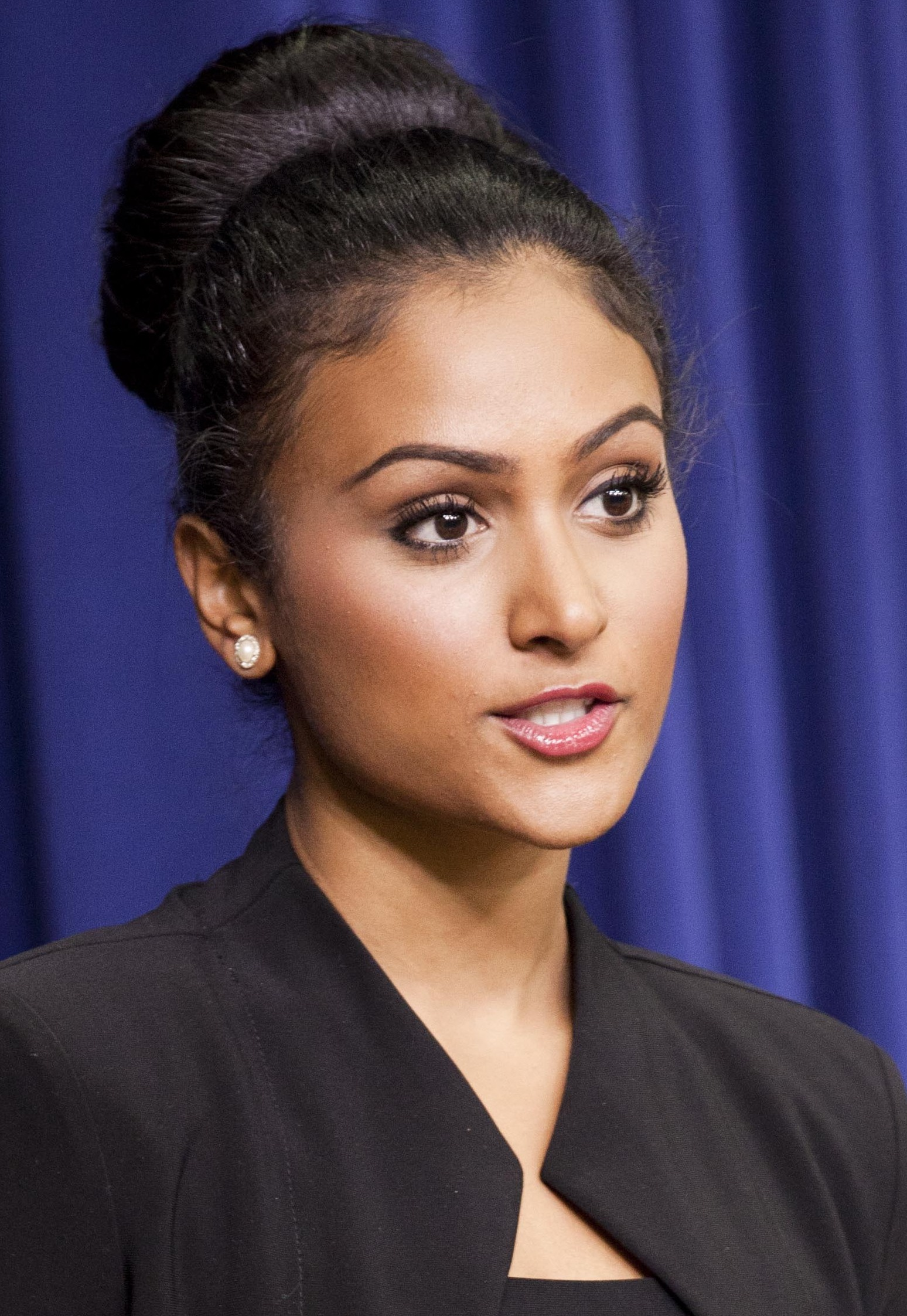
- Davuluri at the White House Forum on Minorities in Energy, November 2013
- Born: April 20, 1989 (age 37); Syracuse, New York, U.S.
- Education: University of Michigan (BS)
- Occupations: Speaker and advocate
- Known for: First Indian American Miss America and Miss New York
- Term: September 15, 2013 – September 14, 2014
- Predecessor: Mallory Hagan
- Successor: Kira Kazantsev
- Beauty pageant titleholder
- Title: Miss Southwest Michigan's Outstanding Teen 2005; Miss Michigan's Outstanding Teen 2006; Miss Greater Rochester 2012; Miss Syracuse 2013; Miss New York 2013; Miss America 2014
- Major competitions: Miss America's Outstanding Teen 2007 (first runner-up); Miss America 2014 (winner)
- Website: www.ninadavuluri.com

Nina Davuluri (born April 20, 1989) is an American public speaker, advocate, and beauty queen who hosts the reality show Made in America on Zee TV America from Manhattan.

As Miss America 2014, she became the first Indian American contestant to win both the Miss New York followed by the Miss America Competition. She is also the second Asian American to be crowned Miss America.

== Early life ==
Davuluri was born on April 20, 1989, in Syracuse, New York, into a Telugu family from India. Her mother is an Information technology specialist, her father was a gynecologist, and her sister is a doctor. When she was six weeks old, Davuluri was brought to live with her grandmother and aunt in Vijayawada, Andhra Pradesh. She stayed there until she was two-and-a-half years old, when her parents brought her back to the United States, returning to India each summer in order to study Indian dance. She is also fluent in Telugu.

Davuluri moved to Oklahoma when she was four years old. She lived there until she was 10, next moving to St. Joseph, Michigan. This period of her life would become the foundation for her future Miss American platform, "Celebrating Diversity Through Cultural Competency," as its goal is to confront bullying by actively learning to talk about diversity in an open and respectful way.

As a child, Davuluri studied ballet, tap, and jazz dance, and was later in the St. Joseph High School, where she participated in the marching band, played varsity tennis, and was on the Science Olympiad team. She graduated from St. Joseph in 2007, the same year that her parents moved to Fayetteville, New York. She chose to stay in Michigan, however, first beginning college at Michigan State University, and later transferring to the University of Michigan, where she was a Sigma Kappa/Alpha Mu, was on the Dean's List, and received Michigan Merit and National Honor Society Awards. She graduated in 2011 with a B.S. in brain behavior and cognitive science. She then moved back in with her family in New York, where she took nine pre-med courses at Le Moyne College. Halfway through her tenure as Miss America, however, she announced that she would not be applying to medical school.

== Miss Michigan's Outstanding Teen and Miss New York ==
At the age of 16, Davuluri became interested in beauty pageants after her sister Meena won the title of Miss St. Joseph. As she was too young to enter local pageants, Davuluri became involved with Miss America's Teen division in Michigan, where she also learned that she could earn scholarship money for college. She won the Miss Southwest Michigan's Outstanding Teen 2005 pageant, followed by the Miss Michigan's Outstanding Teen 2006 pageant, and was first runner-up at the Miss America's Outstanding Teen 2007 pageant. After winning nearly $25,000 in scholarship money, she stopped competing for a few years and focused instead on her undergraduate education. After graduating from the University of Michigan, Davuluri returned to competing in pageants in order to fund graduate school. In 2012, as a New York resident, she won the title of Miss Greater Rochester 2012, and was named second runner-up in the Miss New York 2012 pageant.

Davuluri tried again the following year and won the title of Miss Syracuse 2013. She was then crowned Miss New York 2013. Davuluri has spoken publicly about losing 53 pounds (24 kg), her struggle with bulimia, and her belief that "you don't need to be a certain size to be healthy".

== Miss America ==
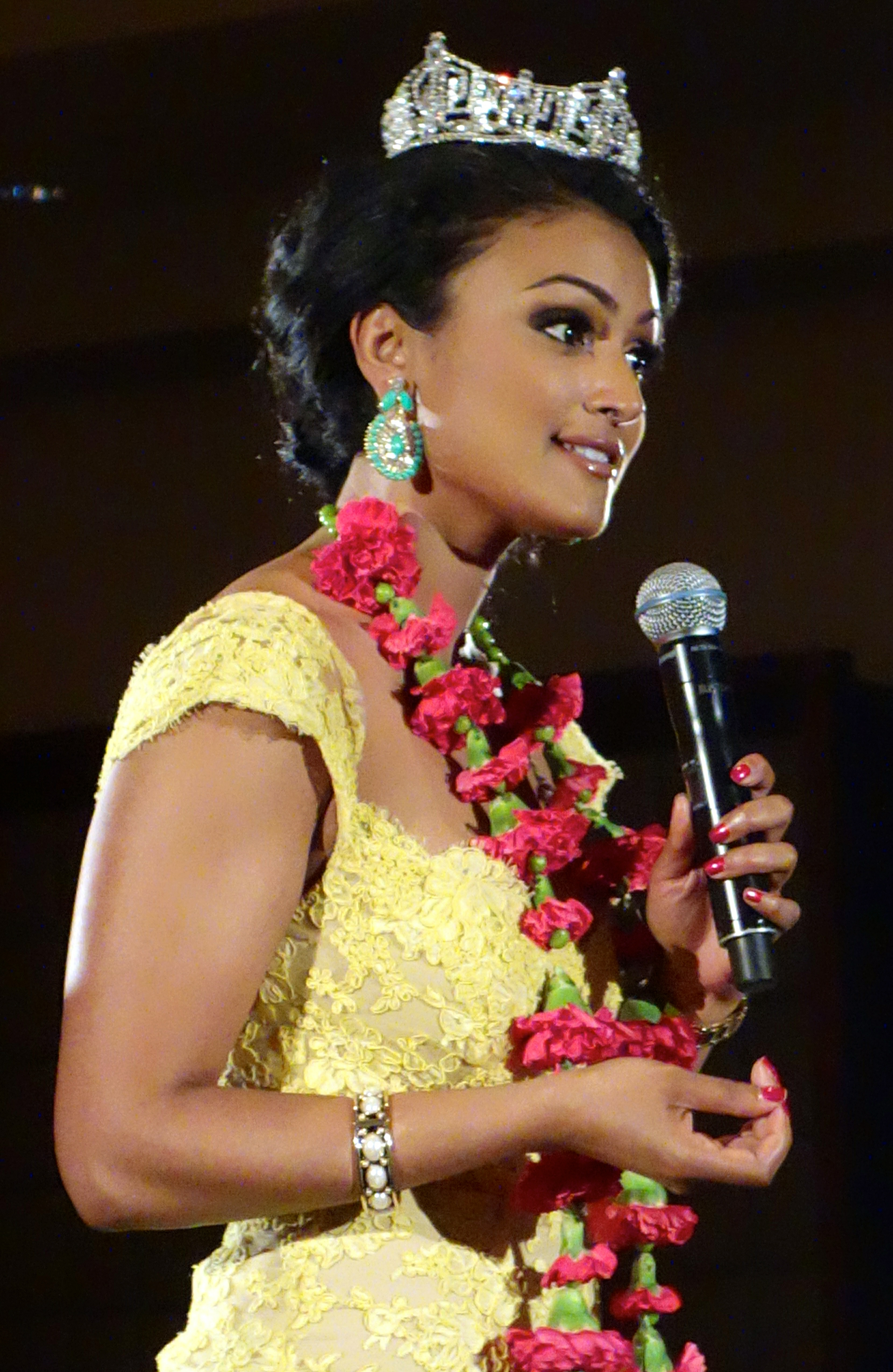
At the International Alliance for the Prevention of AIDS (IAPA) benefit dinner, April 19, 2014

Davuluri, the first Indian American to win the Miss America pageant (and the second Miss New York in a row), held the title of Miss America 2014 from September 15, 2013, to September 14, 2014. In doing so, she followed in the footsteps of a previous Miss Syracuse/Miss New York, Vanessa Williams, who (as Miss America 1984) was the first African American winner of the pageant. She is also the second Asian American contestant to be crowned Miss America (the first was Filipino American Angela Perez Baraquio in 2001). NPR's Michael Martin commented on this aspect of her win by noting that "there were five Asian-Americans competing for the crown. That's the highest number in pageant history. Three of you were in the top five. Two of you were the finalists, and this in a contest where initially the requirements were that contestants be of good health and of the white race."

Drawing on her background in Kuchipudi and Bharatanatyam, Davuluri danced to the song "Dhoom Taana" from the film Om Shanti Om for her talent performance. Her routine, the first time Bollywood appeared on the Miss America stage, was developed in conjunction with Nakul Dev Mahajan as a fusion of Bollywood and Indian classical dance. After being crowned Miss America, she said that she was told that she was "never going to win with a Bollywood talent so just go back to singing if you are serious about [winning]."

During the final moments of the pageant, one of the hosts, Lara Spencer, approached the only contestants left on the stage, Davuluri and Miss California Crystal Lee and asked them how they were "feeling." Davuluri replied that both she and Lee were "so proud. We're making history right here, standing here as Asian-Americans." She later described that part of the pageant as "very surreal."

I really wanted to help effect a change in beauty standards . ... Miss America's branding is so associated with the girl next door, which has always meant blonde hair and blue eyes with only a few exceptions, but the girl next door must evolve as the country evolves. When I was younger I wanted to fit in, but I was aware growing up that I didn't fit that mould, and I really wanted to help make a change that meant young girls wouldn't feel like that.

— Nina Davuluri

=== Aftermath ===
[After being named Miss New York 2013], people called me a terrorist and ridiculous things like that. When that happened, I sat down with my mom and sister ... saying, 'why is this happening? I was born in New York, and I've always thought of myself as first and foremost American and my platform is diversity.'

The biggest thing I realized is that many of these remarks aren't necessarily meant to be malicious but are simply a factor of ignorance ... understanding everyone's beliefs and backgrounds and finding that common ground so we can all communicate in an open, honest and respectful manner ... is something I've essentially been promoting my entire life.

— Nina Davuluri

Shortly after she was crowned Miss America 2014, Davuluri became the target of xenophobic and racist commentary in American social media. The news media compared this response to the backlash against Vanessa Williams after she became Miss America 1984. Congresswoman Grace Meng additionally linked Davuluri's experience to the antisemitism that Jewish American Bess Myerson faced as Miss America 1945. Many of the comments demanded to know why Davuluri was chosen over the soldier, Miss Kansas Theresa Vail, misidentified her as Muslim or Arab (equating both terms to the word "terrorist"), or associated her with groups such as Al-Qaeda. They also noted the pageant date relative to the September 11 anniversary, and generally expressed anti-Indian sentiments and anti-Arab sentiments. Davuluri later said that she was prepared for the social-media response because she faced a similar situation a few months earlier when she was crowned Miss New York.

Some responded to the backlash in a show of solidarity with Davuluri. Students at Duke University, and with Yale University's Asian American Cultural Center and the South Asian Society, created videos and ran photo campaigns denouncing the social media attacks, while Miss Kansas Theresa Vail blogged and gave interviews to discredit the comments about both herself and Davuluri. Actor and civil-rights activist George Takei (the original Hikaru Sulu in Star Trek) posted a comment on Facebook stating that while he normally doesn't "care about Miss America ... the uproar over an Indian-American winning (whom many decried for being 'Arab') has me shaking my head. Please tell me I'm not alone in wondering whether we've learned anything at all." University of Michigan student Munmun Khan also stated that while she doesn't like beauty pageants, she hates "racism and bigotry even more ... Not only was [Davuluri] the first Indian Miss New York, but she is now also the first Indian Miss America. All cause for celebration." Finally, Immediate Past President, Young Democrats of America, Atima Omara, argued that "a sexist, racist, xenophobic attack against one prominent woman of color is an attack against us all, and it shouldn't be tolerated just because we disdain that woman's choices. As an African-American woman with an ethnic name, I know the constant sting that comes from hearing how you are not American enough no matter how much you accomplish in the name of America."

Here, in America, we have this billion-dollar industry that is tanning salons and products, and abroad in many Asian countries, we have our own billion-dollar industry of fairness creams and bleaching products ... I think it's this idea of wanting what you don't have. I think when I learned about ... all the blog posts and commentary highlighting this aspect of "She never would have won Miss India if she were competing there", my reaction to that is "Well, I never wanted to be Miss India" ... when I was growing up, I heard people in India say, 'You would be so much more beautiful if you were fairer". But I've been able to take on this role and say, "You know what? I'm proud".

— Nina Davuluri

An editorial by the staff of The Hindu highlighted a different narrative in India and the Indian diaspora regarding her win and colorism. The editorial suggested that rather than hold a pageant title in India, "the dark complexioned 24-year-old [Davuluri] would not have stood a chance ... had she been in India, far from entering a beauty contest, it is more likely that Ms Davuluri would have grown up hearing mostly disparaging remarks about the colour of her skin; she would have been — going by the storyline of most "fairness" cream advertisements — a person with low self-esteem and few friends." Yale Law School Dean Asha Rangappa echoed these sentiments when she stated that "Davuluri is following in the footsteps of other darker-skinned Indian women who have been recognized in America for their talent and beauty, like The Office's Mindy Kaling or ER's Parminder Nagra — women who'd never get a second glance in India." Similar remarks appeared in social media and in numerous editorials. Davuluri also discussed the subject with reporters in the American media, stating that she was interested in becoming involved in the "Dark is Beautiful" campaign.

=== Platform ===
During her year as Miss America, Davuluri promoted her platform "Celebrating Diversity Through Cultural Competency" and STEM (science, technology, engineering and mathematics) education to high-school and college students. She elaborated on her platform in a Yale University talk as one using social media as a form of activism. Describing it as "Circles of Unity", she encouraged students to view social media as a tool to spread cultural awareness and combat ignorance.

During Davuluri's visit to Central York High School in Pennsylvania, 18-year-old Patrick Farves was suspended for inviting her to his 2014 prom during a question-and-answer session. Although she requested that the suspension be lifted in a Facebook post, school administrators said that they must maintain standards for student behavior. Farves later stated that he regretted the joke as it overshadowed her platform.

She also met with President Barack Obama for the Children's Miracle Network Hospital Champions at the White House.

Last Tuesday, the first Indian Miss America, Nina Davuluri, came to speak at Yale University. She is also the first Miss America to receive xenophobic comments about being a terrorist or Muslim extremist. In addition to being all-around well spoken, graceful and sassy, she thoughtfully explained her platform of cultural competence and stressed that patiently answering people's questions is one of the strongest ways to combat ignorance ... Responding to offensive questions with tolerance and patience might be more effective than harsh words. As we can see from Davuluri's response to her critics, tolerance begets tolerance.

— Yale University junior Lorraine James in February 2014

== Speaker and advocate ==
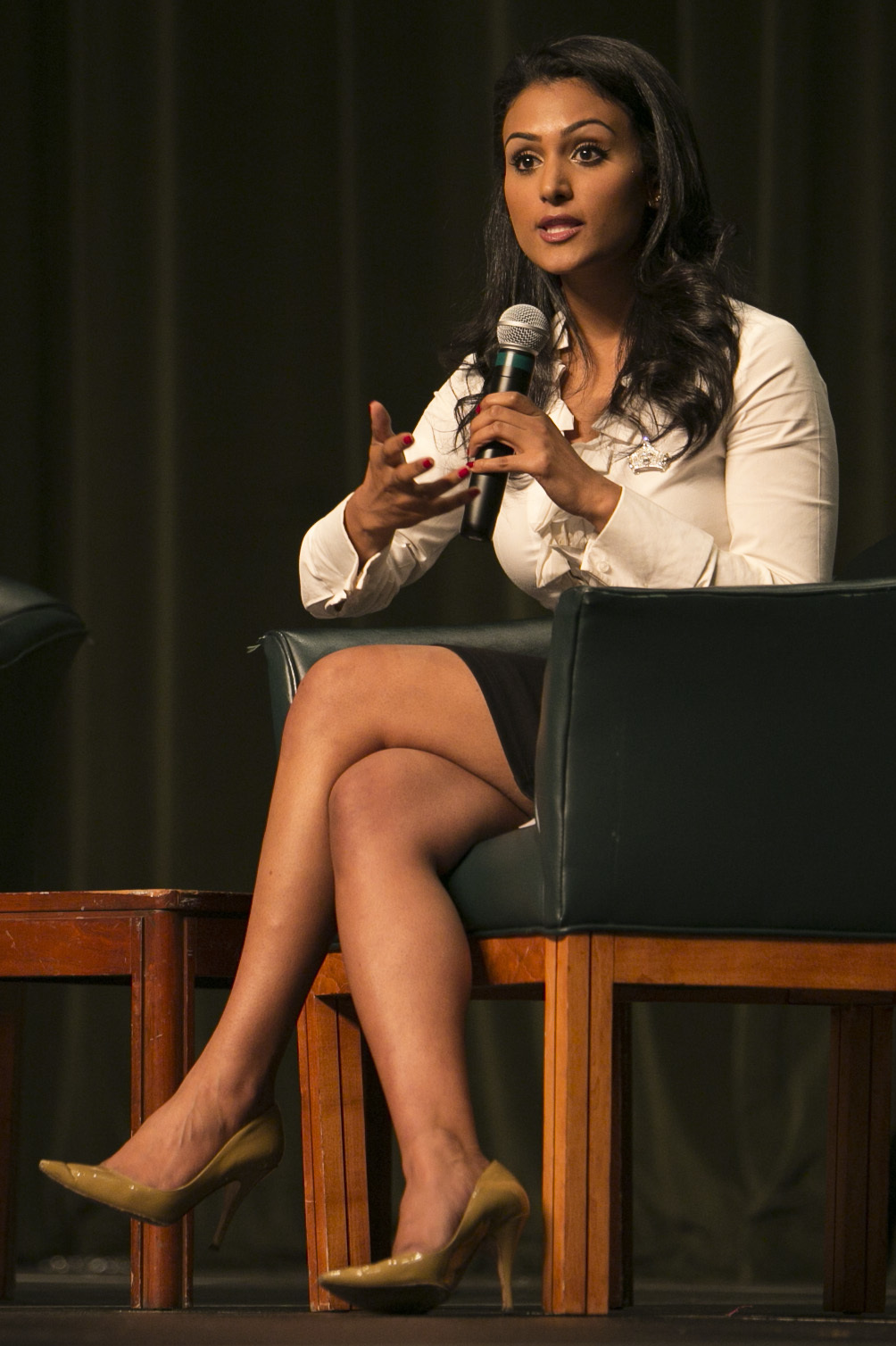
Davuluri speaks to students of the Society of Asian Scientists and Engineers in Philadelphia on October 17, 2014.

Since completing her year as Miss America in September 2014, Davuluri has worked as a public speaker and advocate for diversity, gender equality, and the promotion of STEM education. In this capacity, she has spoken in both political and diplomatic venues. In September 2014, she shared the stage with PBS' NewsHour Weekend anchor Hari Sreenivasan as hosts for a Madison Square Garden talk by Indian Prime Minister Narendra Modi. She also participated in the 2015 Global Entrepreneurship Summit Youth and Women Day in Nairobi in July 2015. About a year later, Davuluri traveled to Mumbai, Hyderabad, and Vijayawada as part of an official March 2016 tour for the U.S. State Department to discuss women's education. Part of this tour focused on events connected with International Women's Day (including a talk for the Asia Society).

Davuluri continues to speak on the subjects of diversity and STEM at college campuses. In an October 2014 East Carolina University talk, she discussed the harassment she faced during her childhood." The following month, she spoke on women in STEM at Northeastern University. In March 2015, she spoke at Harvard's "Side by Side" gender-equality campaign. Later in the same month, she discussed the subject of diversity at Princeton.

== Other accolades ==
- India Abroad Face of the Future Award 2014: India Abroad, June 19, 2015, M69-M82.
- Elected trustee to the Miss America Foundation Board in February 2015 (the first Miss America elected to the board).
- In August 2014 fashion designer Tony Bowls announced that he designed a shoe, "The Nina," in her honor.

== See also ==
- Indians in the New York City metropolitan area

Awards and achievements
Preceded by Mallory Hagan	Miss America; 2014	Succeeded by Kira Kazantsev
Preceded by Shannon Oliver	Miss New York; 2013	Succeeded by Amanda Mason
Preceded by Ashley Noelle Loader	Miss Michigan's Outstanding Teen; 2006	Succeeded by Madelynne Wagner
