= Hinterberger =

Hinterberger is a surname. Notable people with the surname include:

- Ernst Hinterberger (1931–2012), Austrian writer
- Mary Hinterberger (1954–2009), American beauty pageant contestant

== See also ==
- Hinterberger-Konig geometry, used in sector instrument for mass spectrometry
