= Miss New York's Teen =

Miss New York’s Teen
- Formation: 2005
- Type: Beauty pageant
- Headquarters: New York City
- Location: New York
- Members: Miss America's Teen
- Official language: English
- Key people: Sloane Lewis; Bailey Catan
- Website: Official website

The Miss New York's Teen competition is a pageant that selects the representative for the U.S. state of New York in the Miss America's Teen pageant.

Lucille Esler of Gloversville was crowned Miss New York's Teen on July 27, 2026, at the Cultural Arts Theater at Rockland Community College, in Suffern, New York. She competed for the title of Miss America's Teen 2027, and placed in the Top 11. She was also named a preliminary fitness award winner.

== Results summary ==
The year in parentheses indicates year of Miss America's Outstanding Teen competition the award/placement was garnered.

=== Placements ===
- Miss America's Outstanding Teen: Maria DeSantis (2007)
- 4th runner-up: Dajania James (2023)
- Top 11: Lucille Esler (2027)

=== Awards ===
==== Preliminary awards ====
- Preliminary Talent: Maria DeSantis (2007), Alison Stroming (2011), Asia Hickman (2018)
- Preliminary Fitness: Lucille Esler (2027)

==== Non-finalist awards ====
- Non-finalist Interview: Alisa Vasquez (2016)
- Non-finalist Evening Wear/OSQ: Cayla Kumar (2019)
- Non-finalist Talent: Cayla Kumar (2019)

==== Other awards ====
- Spirit of America: Shannon Ryan (2013), Alisa Vasquez (2016)
- Outstanding Instrumental Talent: Asia Hickman (2018)
- Overall Dance Talent: Cayla Kumar (2019)
- Teens in Action Award Finalists: Cayla Kumar (2019)

== Winners ==
- Declared as Winner
- Ended as a runner-up
- Ended as a finalist or semi-finalist

Year	Name	Hometown	Age	Local title	Talent	Placement	Special scholarships at pageant	Notes
2026	Lucille Esler	Gloversville	15	Miss Finger Lakes’ Teen	Lyrical Dance	Top 11	Preliminary Fitness Winner	Niece of Miss New York 1997, Lisa Esler
2025	Nadia Anwar	Staten Island	18	Miss Staten Island's Teen	Vocal			
2024	Erica Parks	New York City	17	Miss Greater New York's Teen	Tap Dance			
2023	Sadie Perry	Fonda	17	Miss Upstate New York's Teen	Tap Dance			
2022	Dajania James	Rochester	17	Miss Rochester's Outstanding Teen	Dance	4th runner-up		
2021	Gianna Caetano	Lancaster	17	Miss Western New York's Outstanding Teen	Piano, "Midnight Escapade"			
2020	No pageant held							
2019	Sarah Lawrence	Eltingville	17	Miss Richmond County's Outstanding Teen	Contemporary Jazz Dance, "Keeping Your Head Up" by Birdy			
2018	Cayla Kumar	Queens Village	15	Miss Bronx's Outstanding Teen	Bollywood Fusion Dance		Non-finalist Evening Wear/OSQ Award Non-finalist Talent Award Overall Dance Talent Award Teens in Action Award Finalist	Later Miss Connecticut 2025
2017	Asia Hickman	West Point	13	Miss Brooklyn's Outstanding Teen	Piano		Outstanding Instrumental Talent Award Preliminary Talent Award	Later Miss District of Columbia Teen USA 2022
2016	Lauryn Whitfield	Rochester	16	Miss Upstate New York's Outstanding Teen	Dance			
2015	Alisa Vasquez	Washingtonville	17	Miss Upstate New York's Outstanding Teen	Vocal		Non-finalist Interview Award Spirit of America Award	
2014	Cady Ruth Stoever	Rush		Miss Flower City's Outstanding Teen	Violin			
2013	Krysta Prehoda	Ballston Spa	17	Miss Empire Rose's Outstanding Teen	Vocal, "What it Means to Be a Friend"			
2012	Shannon Ryan	Clifton Park	17	Miss Empire Rose's Outstanding Teen	Dance		Spirit of America Award	
2011	Lauren Molella	Millbrook	15	Miss Duchess County's Outstanding Teen	Dance, "Arabian Nights"			Daughter of Miss Massachusetts 1983 and National Sweetheart 1982, Holly Mayer Niece of Miss New York 1989, Lisa Molella Later Miss New York 2019
2010	Alison Stroming	New York City		Miss Jubilee's Outstanding Teen	Ballet		Preliminary Talent Award	Trained at the Jacqueline Kennedy Onassis School at the American Ballet Theatre
2009	Kara Jae Kowalski	Castleton Corners	15	Miss Richmond County's Outstanding Teen	Vocal			
2008	Alexandra Mazzucchelli	Great Kills	16	Miss Staten Island's Outstanding Teen	Vocal			
2007	Allison Carlos	Watertown	15	Miss Adirondack International Speedway's Outstanding Teen	Dance			
2006	Brittany Balandis	Fairport	16	Miss Greater Niagara's Outstanding Teen		N/A		3rd runner-up at Miss New York's Outstanding Teen 2006 pageant Assumed title when DeSantis was named Miss America's Outstanding Teen 2007
2006	Maria DeSantis	Todt Hill	17	Miss Staten Island's Outstanding Teen	Vocal	Winner	Preliminary Talent Award	3rd runner-up at Miss New York 2012 pageant Top 10 at National Sweetheart 2012 pageant
2005	Amanda Lee Alicea	Huguenot	16	Miss Staten Island's Outstanding Teen	Vocal			
