= Mary Hinterberger =

American beauty pageant contestant

Mary Theresa Hinterberger (January 15, 1954 – January 22, 2009) was the runner-up for title of Miss New York in 1975, later promoted to that title after the winner, Tawny Godin, won the Miss America contest.

== Biography ==
Hinterberger was born in Buffalo, New York in 1954, and raised in Clifton Park. She was the oldest daughter of seven children.

After taking over the title of Miss New York in the Fall of 1975 (when Tawny Godin became Miss America), Hinterberger studied music at SUNY Potsdam. During her reign as Miss New York, she held speaking engagements for various companies during the year.

== Later years ==
She moved to Texas in 1976, where she worked in the energy industry and had her own seismic brokerage company, Seisnet data services. She married Scott Seaman in December 2007. She died from breast cancer in 2009, at age 54.

Preceded by Tawny Godin	Miss New York; 1975	Succeeded by Sonja Anderson
