= Miss New York =

Beauty pageant competition

Miss New York Scholarship Competition
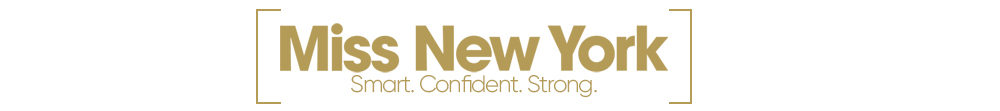
- Formation: 1921
- Type: Beauty pageant
- Headquarters: New York City
- Location: New York
- Members: Miss America
- Official language: English
- Key people: Sloane Lewis (Executive Director)
- Website: www.missnewyork.org

The Miss New York scholarship competition selects the representative for the state of New York in the Miss America scholarship competition.

In the fall of 2018, the Miss America Organization terminated the Miss New York organization's license as well as licenses from Florida, Georgia, New Jersey, Pennsylvania, Tennessee, and West Virginia. In March 2019, the license was awarded to Sloane Lewis and Jamie Hickman, along with a board of directors consisting of 13 members.

Madison Oh of Avon, Connecticut, was crowned Miss New York on June 27, 2026, at the Cultural Arts Theater at Rockland Community College, in Suffern, New York. She competed for the title of Miss America 2027 on September 6, 2026, at the Kravis Center for the Performing Arts in West Palm Beach, Florida.

== Gallery of titleholders ==
A New York delegate has won the Miss America crown eight times (and is the first state to produce winners three consecutive years):

- Bess Myerson (1945, first Jewish American Miss America, competed as Miss New York City)
- Tawny Godin (1976)
- Vanessa Williams (1984, first African American Miss America)
- Mallory Hagan (2013)
- Nina Davuluri (2014, first Indian American Miss America)
- Kira Kazantsev (2015)
- Nia Franklin (2019)
- Cassie Donegan (2026)
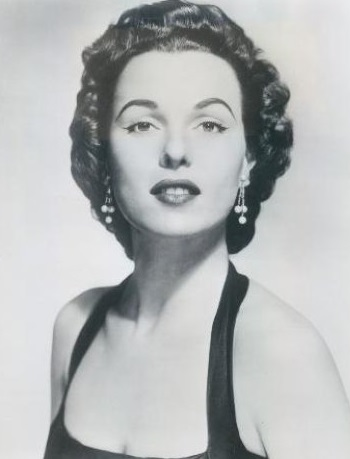
Bess Myerson,
Miss America 1945

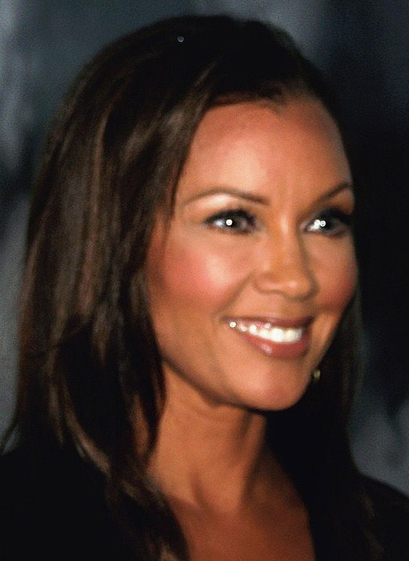
Vanessa Williams,
Miss America 1984

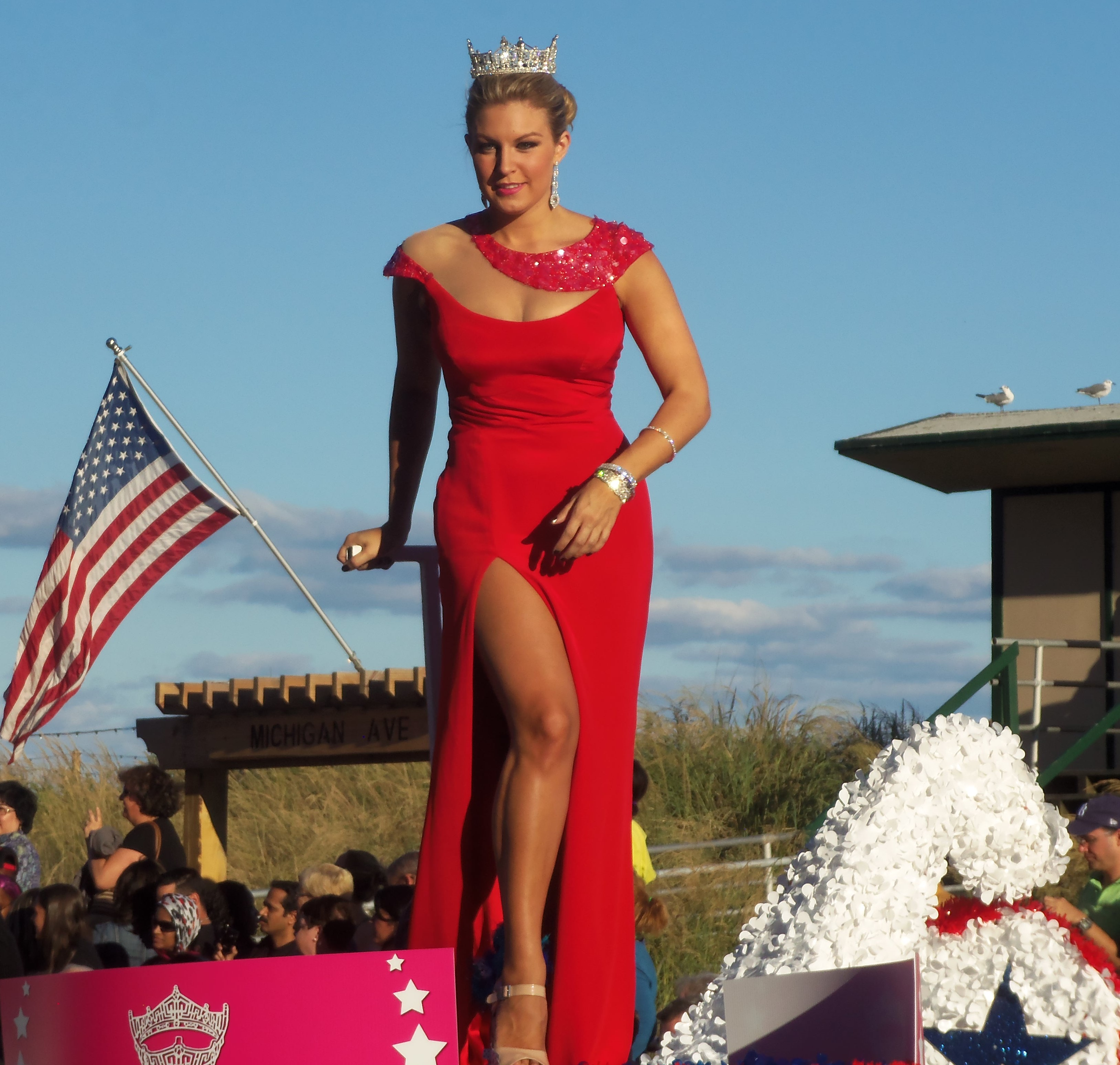
Mallory Hagan,
Miss America 2013

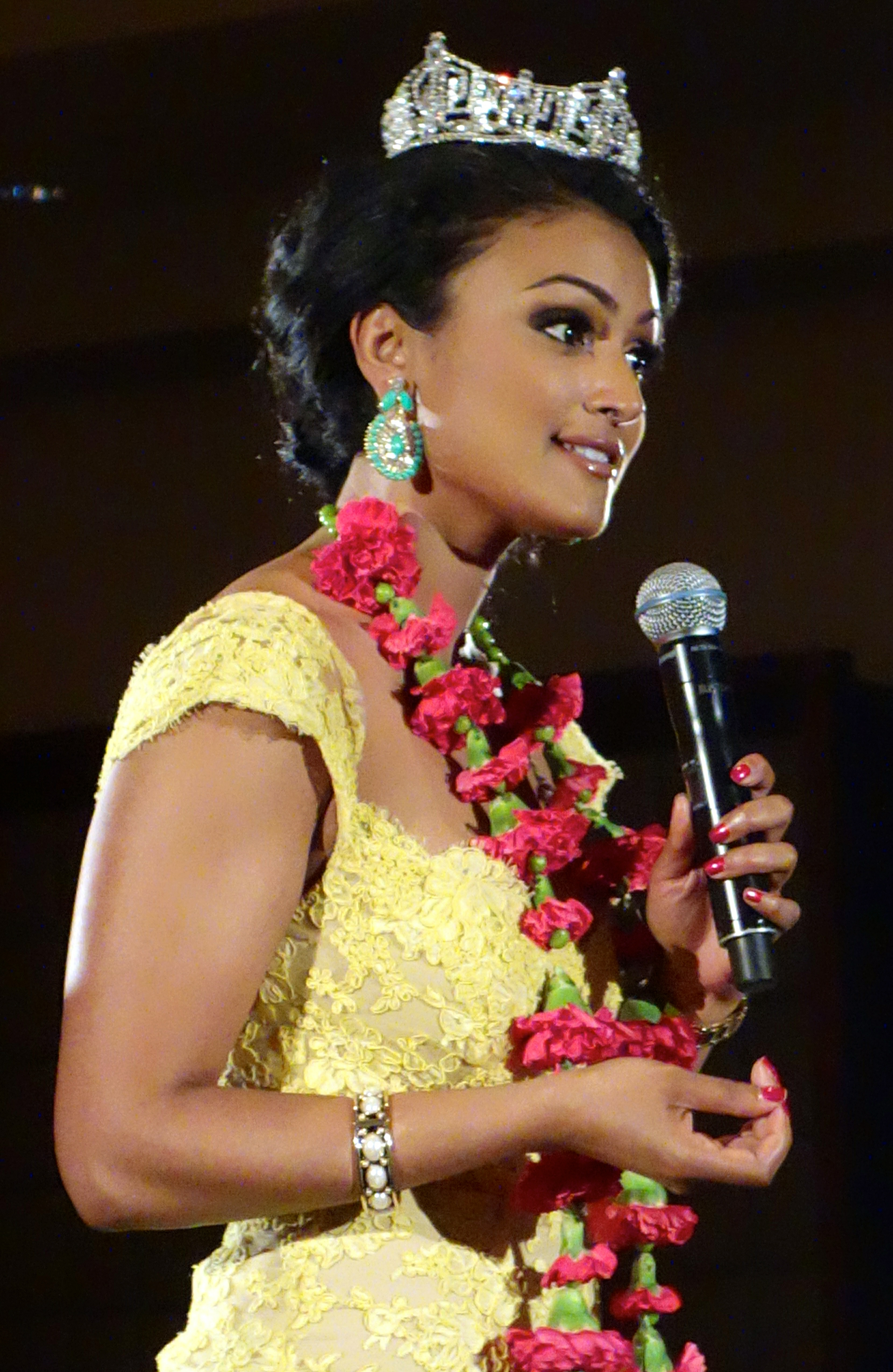
Nina Davuluri,
Miss America 2014

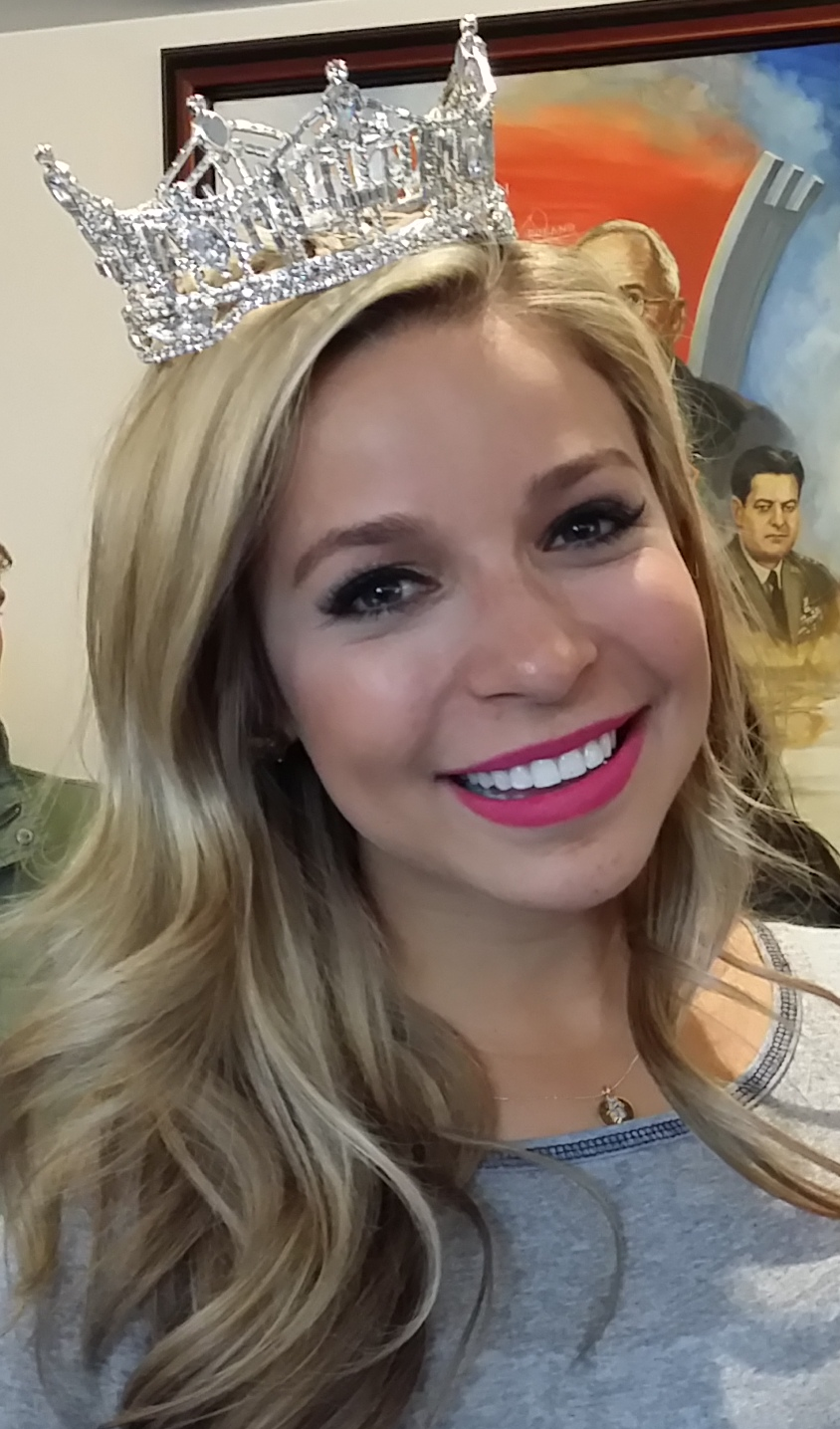
Kira Kazantsev,
Miss America 2015

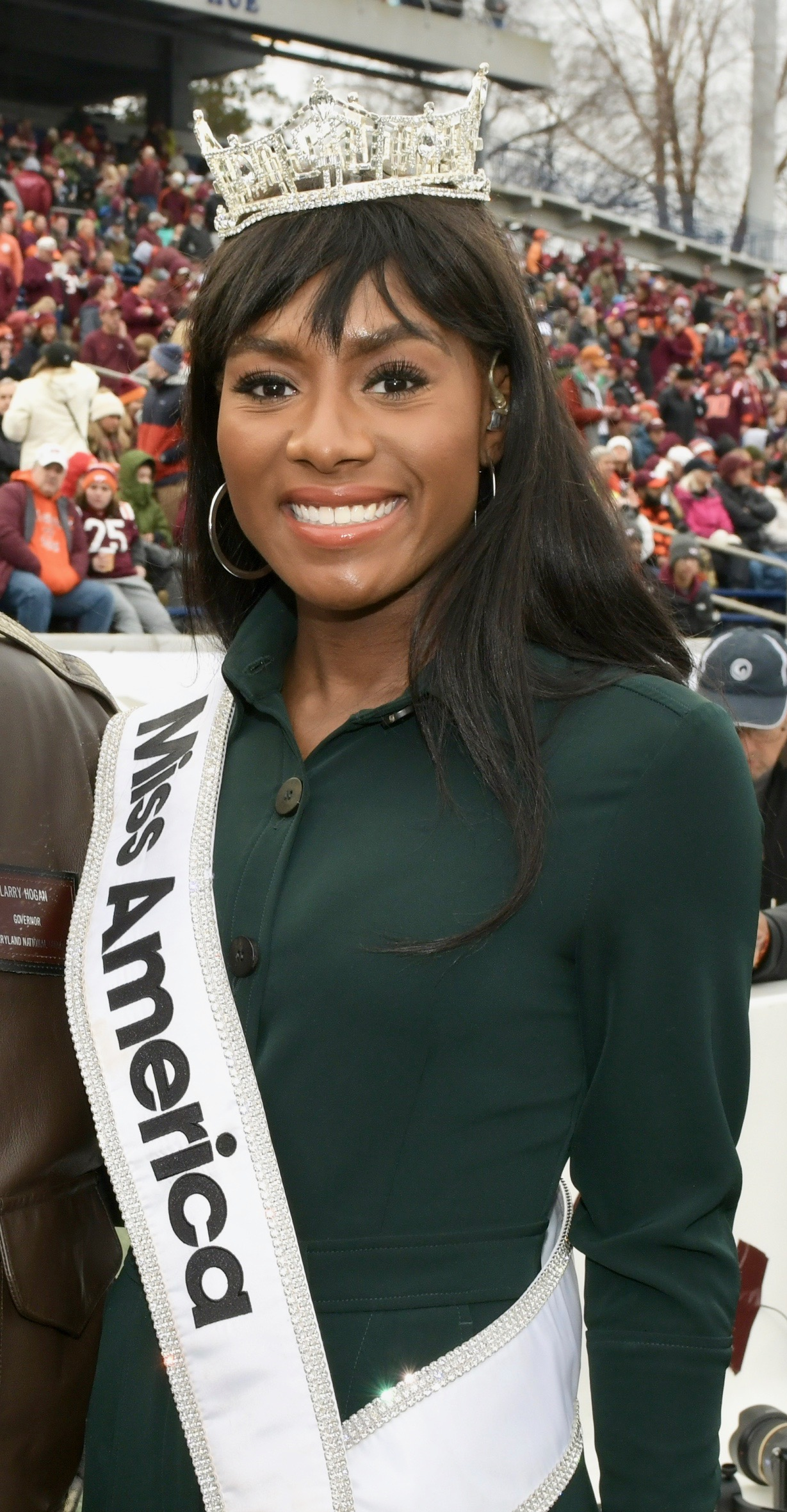
Nia Franklin,
Miss America 2019

== Results summary ==
The following is a visual summary of the past results of Miss New York titleholders at the national Miss America pageants/competitions. The year in parentheses indicates the year of the national competition during which a placement and/or award was garnered, not the year attached to the contestant's state title.

=== Placements ===
- Miss Americas: Bess Myerson (1945), Tawny Godin (1976), Vanessa Williams (1984), Mallory Hagan (2013), Nina Davuluri (2014), Kira Kazantsev (2015), Nia Franklin (2019); Cassie Donegan (2026)
- 1st runners-up: Dorothy Knapp (1922) Ethelda Kenvin (1923), Florence Meyer (1933), Joan Kaible (1954), Marisol Montalvo (1992), Taryn Delanie Smith (2023)
- 2nd runners-up: Heather Eulalie Walker (1923), Kaitlin Monte (2012), Camille Sims (2017)
- 3rd runners-up: Lillian O'Donnell (1941), Milena Mae Miller (1943), Leigh-Taylor Smith (2009), Sydney Park (2022)
- 4th runners-up: Alice Beatrice Roberts (tie) (1924), Sonja Anderson (1977), Andrea Plummer (2002)
- Top 10: Margie Booth (1924), Edith Higgins (1925), Fern Jackson (1925), Alice Beatrice Roberts (1925), Annyse Sherman (1942), Joan Kayne (1953), Bonnie Jo Marquis (1960), Patricia Burmeister (1969), Linda Trybus (1970), Katherine Karlsrud (1971), Kelli Krull (1980), Cheryl Flanagan (1981), Suzanne Alexander (1982), Mary-Ann Farrell (1985), Helen Goldsby (1996), Tiffany Walker (2003), Christina Ellington (2005)
- Top 11: Amelia Collins (2024), Madison Oh (2027)
- Top 12: Renee Vera Hall (1935), Betty Jo Dazey (1944), Claire Buffie (2011)
- Top 15: Catherine Kennedy (1926), Ruth K. Patterson (1926), Dorothea B. Ditner (1927), Freida Louise Mierse (1927), Elissa Winston (1938), Barbara Beech (1938), Clare E. Foley (1939), Grace DeWitt (1941), Raven Malone (1947), Connie Inge Ronde (1948), Loreen Osgood (1949), Lauren Molella (2020)
- Top 16: Helen Fleiss (1937), Grace Travis (1937), Evelyn Raye (1937), Violet Mellar (1946), Eileen Henry (1946), Phyllis Battleson (1951)

=== Awards ===
==== Preliminary awards ====
- Preliminary Lifestyle and Fitness: Bess Myerson (1945), Bonnie Jo Marquis (1960), Vanessa Williams (1984), Tiffany Walker (2003), Leigh-Taylor Smith (2009), Alyse Zwick (2010), Kaitlin Monte (2012)
- Preliminary Talent: Grace Travis (1937), Marion Moselle (1942), Bess Myerson (1945) (tie), Joan Kayne (1953), Heather Taferner (1955) (tie), Sonja Anderson (1977), Kelli Krull (1980), Cheryl Flanagan (1981), Suzanne Alexander (1982), Vanessa Williams (1984), Mary-Ann Farrell (1985), Marisol Montalvo (1992), Helen Goldsby (1996), Sydney Park (2022), Cassie Donegan (2026)

==== Non-finalist awards ====
- Non-finalist Talent: Barbara Gloede (1964), Marsha Metrinko (1964), Julie Just (1965), Kari Pedersen (1968), Eileen Clark (1983), Jill Privateer (1986), Mia Seminoff (1989), Lisa Marie Molella (1990), Ingrid Olsen (1993), Brandi Burkhardt (2000), Bethlene Pancoast (2007)

==== Other awards ====
- Miss Congeniality: Violet Mellar (1946), Susan Jane Talbert (1961)
- Dr. David B. Allman Medical Scholarship: Katherine Karlsrud (1971)
- America's Choice: Claire Buffie (2011)
- Charles & Theresa Brown Scholarship: Kira Kazantsev (2015)
- Evening Dress Award Runner-up: Eileen Snyder (1923)
- Intercity Beauty Award Third Prize: Dorothy Hughes (1922)
- Professional Beauty Award: Virginia Lee (1921), Dorothy Knapp (1922)
- Professional Beauty Award Second Prize: Pauline Virginia Dakla (1922)
- Quality of Life Award Finalists: Kaitlin Monte (2012), Cassie Donegan (2026)
- Roller Chair Parade Fifth Prize: Ethelda Kenvin (1923)
- STEM Scholarship Award 2nd runners-up: Lauren Molella (2020)
- AHA Go Red for Women Leadership Award Regional Winner: Cassie Donegan (2026)

== Winners ==
- Declared as winner
- Ended as a runner-up
- Ended as a finalist or semi-finalist

Year	Name	Hometown	Age	Local Title	Miss America Talent	Placement at Miss America	Special scholarships at Miss America	Notes
2026	Madison Oh	Avon, Connecticut	21	Miss Empire	Dance	Top 11		
2025	Lauren Norris	Wetumpka, Alabama	27	Miss Metropolitan	Vocal	Did not compete; originally 3rd runner-up, later assumed title when Donegan won Miss America 2026		
2025	Cassie Donegan	Queens	27	Miss Five Boroughs	Vocal, "A Darker Shade of Blue"	Winner	Preliminary Talent Award AHA Go Red for Women Leadership Award Regional Winner	Previously Miss Virginia's Outstanding Teen 2013, (4th runner-up at nationals; talent preliminary winner; outstanding vocalist winner); Miss New York Volunteer 2024 (2nd runner-up at nationals; talent preliminary winner)
2024	Abigail Quammen	Manhattan	24	Miss Empire	Vocal, "My Way"			Previously Miss Kentucky's Outstanding Teen 2017
2023	Amelia Collins	Minot, North Dakota	21	Miss Manhattan	Lyrical Dance	Top 11		Previously Miss Tennessee Volunteer; 3rd Runner-Up to Miss Volunteer America 2022
2022	Taryn Delanie Smith	Manhattan	25	Miss Greater New York	Vocal	1st Runner-Up		First Runner Up at Miss New York 2021. Second Runner Up at Miss Washington 2017. Fourth Runner Up at Miss Washington 2016. Top 10 at Miss Washington 2015.
2021	Sydney Park	South Bronx	25	Miss Five Boroughs	Original Monologue	3rd runner-up	Preliminary Talent Award	First Runner Up at Miss New York 2019
2019–20 (Note: Titleholder extended to a full year in 2020 after state and national pageants postponed to 2021 due to the COVID-19 pandemic.)	Lauren Molella	Millbrook	23	Miss Upstate New York	Ballet en Pointe	Top 15	STEM Scholarship Award 2nd runner-up	Daughter of Miss Massachusetts 1983 and National Sweetheart 1982, Holly Mayer, and niece of Miss New York 1989, Lisa Molella Previously Miss New York's Outstanding Teen 2011
2018	Rahmeka Cox	New York City		Miss Southern Tier	Vocal	Did not compete; originally 1st runner-up, later assumed title when Franklin won Miss America 2019		
2018	Nia Franklin	Brooklyn	25	Miss Five Boroughs	Operatic Vocal, "Quando m'en vò" from La bohème	Winner		
2017	Gabrielle Walter	Clarence	24	Miss Western New York	Broadway Vocal, "You'll Never Walk Alone" from Carousel			
2016	Camille Sims	Ithaca	23	Miss Pride of New York	Vocal, "Sway"	2nd runner-up		Previously Miss Georgia's Outstanding Teen 2010; 2nd runner-up at Miss America's Outstanding Teen 2011 pageant
2015	Jamie Lynn Macchia	Eltingville	23	Miss Greater New York	Lyrical Dance "I Was Here" by Beyoncé			1st runner-up at National Sweetheart 2014 pageant. 2nd Runner Up at Miss New York 2014. Top 10 at Miss New York 2012.
2014	Jillian Tapper		23	Miss Southern Tier		Did not compete; originally 3rd runner-up, later assumed title when Kazantsev won Miss America 2015		
2014	Kira Kazantsev	Manhattan	23	Miss City of New York	Vocal with Cup Percussion, "Happy" by Pharrell Williams	Winner	Charles & Theresa Brown Scholarship	
2013	Amanda Mason	Manhattan	24	Miss Manhattan	Classical Vocal	Did not compete; later assumed title when Davuluri won Miss America 2014		
2013	Nina Davuluri	Fayetteville	24	Miss Syracuse	Bollywood Fusion Dance, "Dhoom Tana" from Om Shanti Om	Winner		Previously Miss Michigan's Outstanding Teen 2006; 1st runner-up at Miss America's Outstanding Teen 2007 pageant First Indian American crowned Miss America First to perform Bollywood dance at a Miss America pageant
2012	Shannon Oliver	Manhattan	25	Miss Metropolitan	Operatic Vocal	Did not compete; later assumed title when Hagan won Miss America 2013		
2012	Mallory Hagan	Brooklyn	23	Miss New York City	Tap Dance, "Get Up Offa That Thing"	Winner		
2011	Kaitlin Monte	Pittsford	22	Miss Southern New York	Vocal, "Disneyland" from Smile	2nd runner-up	Preliminary Lifestyle & Fitness Award Quality of Life Award Finalist	1st runner-up at National Sweetheart 2008 pageant as Miss Florida
2010	Claire Buffie	New York City	24	Miss Southeast New York	Jazz Dance, "Bye Bye Blackbird"	Top 12	America's Choice	Contestant at National Sweetheart 2008 pageant as Miss Indiana
2009	Alyse Zwick	Scarsdale	23	Miss Westchester County	Ballet en Pointe		Preliminary Lifestyle & Fitness Award	Contestant at National Sweetheart 2008 pageant, now works for WTVT in Tampa, Florida
2008	Leigh-Taylor Smith	New York City	22	Miss Brooklyn	Vocal, "Say the Word"	3rd runner-up	Preliminary Lifestyle & Fitness Award	
2007	Elisabeth Baldanza	Oneonta	23	Miss Empire Rose	Contemporary Ballet, "Your Daddy's Son" from Ragtime			
2006	Bethlene Pancoast	Brooklyn	24	Miss Heart of New York	A cappella Tap Dance		Non-finalist Talent Award	
2005	Kandice Pelletier	New York City	24	Miss Greater New York City	Musical Theatre Dance, "Queenie Was a Blonde" from The Wild Party			Previously National Sweetheart 2003 as Miss Georgia Contestant on The Amazing Race 10 and The Amazing Race 11 with fellow Miss America contestant, Dustin-Leigh Konzelman
2004	Christina Ellington	New York City	22	Miss Southern New York	Classical Vocal, "My Man's Gone Now"	Top 10		4th runner-up at National Sweetheart 2003 pageant
2003	Jessica Lynch	New York City	24	Miss New York City	Jazz Dance en Pointe, "America"			Contestant at National Sweetheart 2002 pageant
2002	Tiffany Walker	Brooklyn	22	Miss New York City	Interpretive Modern Dance, "Bridge Over Troubled Water"	Top 10	Preliminary Swimsuit Award	
2001	Andrea Plummer	New York City	23	Miss New York City	Ballet en Pointe, "Forrest Gump Suite"	4th runner-up		America's Junior Miss 1996
2000	Kelly Falgiano	Lancaster	21	Miss Amherst	Classical Piano, Sonata Pathétique by Beethoven			
1999	Brandi Burkhardt	Pasadena, MD	20	Miss Manhattan	Vocal, "Take Me As I Am" from Jekyll & Hyde		Non-finalist Talent Award	Previously Miss Maryland Teen USA 1997
1998	Deana Herrera	Staten Island	20	Miss Staten Island	Jazz Dance, "Shoeless Joe from Hannibal, Mo." from Damn Yankees			
1997	Lisa Esler	Northville	21	Miss Fulton County	Vocal, "Memory"			
1996	Tammy Harris	Williamstown	24	Miss Oswego County	Dance, "O Fortuna"			
1995	Sunita Param	Buffalo		Miss Buffalo		Did not compete; later assumed title when Goldsby resigned		
1995	Sunita Param	Buffalo		Miss Buffalo				Starred in American Desi, Miss Match, several national commercials
1995	Helen Goldsby	Brooklyn	24	Miss Orange County	Classical Vocal, "Chi Il Bel Sogno di Doretta" from La Rondine	Top 10	Preliminary Talent Award	Title removed by pageant officials
1994	Dione Lee Robinson	Gansevoort	21	Miss Northeastern New York	Dramatic Monologue			
1993	Marcia Cillan	New York City	23	Miss Manhattan	Vocal, "I Am Changing"			
1992	Ingrid Olsen	Port Jefferson	22	Miss Greater Syracuse	Classical Vocal, "Steal Me, Sweet Thief" from The Old Maid and the Thief		Non-finalist Talent Award	
1991	Marisol Montalvo	Holbrook	23	Miss Brooklyn	Classical Vocal, "Tu che di gel sei cinta" from Turandot	1st runner-up	Preliminary Talent Award	
1990	Maryalice Demler	Buffalo	26	Miss Buffalo	Dramatic Soliloquy, "Shall I Tell You What I Think of You?" from The King and I			Currently evening news anchor for WGRZ-TV in Buffalo
1989	Lisa Marie Molella	Millbrook	24	Miss Dutchess County	Vocal Medley, "That's Life" & "But the World Goes 'Round"		Non-finalist Talent Award	Aunt of Miss New York's Outstanding Teen 2011 and Miss New York 2019, Lauren Molella Sister-in-law of Miss Massachusetts 1983 & National Sweetheart 1982, Holly Mayer
1988	Mia Seminoff	New York City	23	Miss Manhattan	Classical Ballet en pointe, La Esmeralda		Non-finalist Talent Award	
1987	Alice Knisley	Staten Island	21	Miss Metropolitan New York City	Vocal Medley			
1986	Dawan McPeak	New York City	25	Miss Metropolitan New York City	Gymnastics Dance			Later Mrs. Texas 2001
1985	Jill Privateer	Fredonia	21	Miss Buffalo	Vocal, "Shine On, Harvest Moon"		Non-finalist Talent Award	
1984	Mary-Ann Farrell	New York City	22	Miss Manhattan	Classical Piano, Danzas Argentinas	Top 10	Preliminary Talent Award	Sister of Miss Florida 1985, Monica Farrell, and Miss Illinois 1992, Kathleen Farrell Aunt of Miss Ohio 2022, Elizabetta Nies
1983	Melissa Manning		26	Miss Westchester County		Did not compete; later assumed title when Williams won Miss America 1984		
1983	Vanessa Williams	Millwood	20	Miss Greater Syracuse	Popular Vocal, "Happy Days Are Here Again"	Winner	Preliminary Swimsuit Award Preliminary Talent Award	First African American Miss America Resigned on July 23, 1984, after Penthouse was to publish nude photos of Williams without her consent
1982	Eileen Clark	Syracuse	23	Miss Greater Syracuse	Classical Vocal, "Glitter and Be Gay" from Candide		Non-finalist Talent Award	
1981	Suzanne Alexander	Lyons Falls	20	Miss Oneida County	Classical Vocal, "Vissi d'arte" from Tosca	Top 10	Preliminary Talent Award	
1980	Cheryl Flanagan	Rochester	18	Miss Greater Rochester	Tap Dance, Medley from That's Entertainment, Part II	Top 10	Preliminary Talent Award	
1979	Kelli Krull	Buffalo	21	Miss Niagara Falls	Baton Twirling Exhibition, "If My Friends Could See Me Now"	Top 10	Preliminary Talent Award	
1978	Paula Pope	Lockport	21	Miss Greater Colonie	Piano, "Piano Concerto" by Tchaikovsky			
1977	Lesly Braun	Pelham Manor	23	Miss Staten Island	Flute Medley, "Take the "A" Train" & "Sir Duke"			
1976	Sonja Anderson	New York City	25	Miss Manhattan	Vocal, "And This Is My Beloved"	4th runner-up	Preliminary Talent Award	Previously Miss New York USA 1975
1975	Mary Hinterberger		21	Miss Thousand Islands		Did not compete; later assumed title when Godin won Miss America 1976		
1975	Tawny Godin	Yonkers	18	Miss Saratoga Springs	Original Piano Composition, "Images in Pastels"	Winner		Later Los Angeles news anchor
1974	Kris Krull	Niagara Falls	22	Miss Erie County East	Jazz Dance, "Superstar" from Jesus Christ Superstar			
1973	Joann Miller	Cheektowaga	20	Miss Erie County East	Jazz Dance			
1972	Judith Keithley	Rochester	19	Miss Rochester	Piano, Rhapsody in Blue			
1971	Elisabeth Condon	Angola	21	Miss Niagara Falls	Acro Jazz Ballet from Applause			
1970	Katherine Karlsrud	Mamaroneck	18	Miss Westchester	Harp, "Whirlwind" by Carlos Salzedo	Top 10	Dr. David B. Allman Medical Scholarship	First Allman Scholarship recipient to graduate from medical school
1969	Linda Trybus	Snyder	20	Miss Amherst	Song & Dance Medley from Mary Poppins	Top 10		
1968	Patricia Burmeister	Portville	24	Miss Rochester	Classical Vocal, "L'Air des clochettes" from Lakmé	Top 10		
1967	Kari Pedersen	Staten Island	21	Miss Staten Island	Classical Vocal, "Vissi d'arte" from Tosca		Non-finalist Talent Award	
1966	Penelope Donoghue	Yonkers	22	Miss Westchester	Modern Dance			
1965	Marlene Butcher	Hamburg	19	Miss Dunkirk	Vocal / Dance, "I Ain't Down Yet" from The Unsinkable Molly Brown			
1964	Julie Just	Buffalo	20	Miss Tri-County	Popular Vocal, "Any Place I Hang My Hat Is Home"		Non-finalist Talent Award	
1963	Barbara Gloede	Staten Island		Miss New York	Vocal & Pantomime, "Guide to World Capitals"		Non-finalist Talent Award	Multiple New York representatives Contestants competed under local title at Miss America pageant
1963	Marsha Metrinko	New York City		Miss New York City	Tap Dance, "Just in Time" & "Blues"		Non-finalist Talent Award	Multiple New York representatives Contestants competed under local title at Miss America pageant
1962	Paula Heins	Le Roy	19	Miss New York	Vocal, "Climb Ev'ry Mountain" from The Sound of Music			Multiple New York representatives Contestants competed under local title at Miss America pageant
1962	Margaret Mary Warncke	Flushing	22	Miss New York City	Vocal, "Mira" from Carnival!		Special Judge's Award	Multiple New York representatives Contestants competed under local title at Miss America pageant
1961	Kathryn Moden	Buffalo	20	Miss New York	Dramatic Reading from A Midsummer Night's Dream			Multiple New York representatives Contestants competed under local title at Miss America pageant
1961	Maryann Hillyer	New York City	20	Miss New York City	Vocal, "The Song Is You"			Multiple New York representatives Contestants competed under local title at Miss America pageant
1960	Susan Talbert	Ogdensburg	19	Miss New York	Dance		Miss Congeniality	Multiple New York representatives Contestants competed under local title at Miss America pageant
1960	Sherrylyn Patecell	New York City		Miss New York City				Multiple New York representatives Contestants competed under local title at Miss America pageant
1959	Bonnie Jo Marquis	Huntington	19	Miss New York	Vocal & Dance, "Whatever Lola Wants"	Top 10	Preliminary Swimsuit Award	Multiple New York representatives Contestants competed under local title at Miss America pageant
1959	Elizabeth Holmes	Malverne	19	Miss New York City	Vocal Impersonation of Maurice Chevalier			Multiple New York representatives Contestants competed under local title at Miss America pageant
1958	Miriam Sanderson	Rensselaer		Miss New York	French Vocal, "Serenade" by Sigmund Romberg			Multiple New York representatives Contestants competed under local title at Miss America pageant
1958	Bette June Piller	New York City		Miss New York City	Speech on Art			Multiple New York representatives Contestants competed under local title at Miss America pageant
1957	Janet Corrigan	Huntington		Miss New York	Vocal, "True Love"			Multiple New York representatives Contestants competed under local title at Miss America pageant
1957	Astrid Papamichael	New York City		Miss New York City	Vocal			Multiple New York representatives Contestants competed under local title at Miss America pageant
1956	Lael Jackson	New York City		Miss New York City	Specialty Number			Competed under local title at respective Miss America pageant
1955	Diana Deutsch	New York City		Miss New York City	Art Sketching			Competed under local title at respective Miss America pageant
1954	Heather Taferner	New York City		Miss New York City	Classical Vocal, "L'Air des clochettes" from Lakmé		Preliminary Talent Award (tie)	Competed under local title at respective Miss America pageant
1953	Jeannine Bowman	Rome		Miss New York	Drama			Multiple New York representatives Contestants competed under local title at Miss America pageant
1953	Joan Kaible	New York City		Miss New York City	Classical Vocal, "Qual fiamma avea nel guardo" from Pagliacci	1st runner-up		Multiple New York representatives Contestants competed under local title at Miss America pageant
1952	Joan St. John	Binghamton		Miss New York	Vocal			Multiple New York representatives Contestants competed under local title at Miss America pageant
1952	Joan Kayne	New York City		Miss New York City	Dance	Top 10	Preliminary Talent Award	Multiple New York representatives Contestants competed under local title at Miss America pageant
1951	Louise Orlando	Syracuse		Miss New York	Vocal			Multiple New York representatives Contestants competed under local title at Miss America pageant
1951	Sandy Scott	New York City		Miss New York City	Vocal			Multiple New York representatives Contestants competed under local title at Miss America pageant
1950	Marilyn Patricia Reynolds	Syracuse	21	Miss New York	Vocal, "I'll Take Romance"			Multiple New York representatives Contestants competed under local title at Miss America pageant
1950	Phyllis Anita Battleson	New York City	22	Miss New York City	Classical Vocal, "Mon cœur s'ouvre à ta voix"	Top 16		Multiple New York representatives Contestants competed under local title at Miss America pageant
1949	Wanda Nalepa	New York City		Miss New York	Speech, "Nursing"			Multiple New York representatives Contestants competed under local title at Miss America pageant
1949	Loreen Osgood	New York City		Miss New York City	Piano, "The Blue Danube"	Top 15		Multiple New York representatives Contestants competed under local title at Miss America pageant
1948	M. Yvonne Fix	Niagara Falls		Miss New York	Classical Vocal, "Un bel di" from Madama Butterfly			Multiple New York representatives Contestants competed under local title at Miss America pageant
1948	Connie Inge Ronde	New York City		Miss New York City	Dramatic Reading, "State of the Union"	Top 15		Multiple New York representatives Contestants competed under local title at Miss America pageant
1947	Lynn Faune	Brooklyn		Miss Brooklyn	Vocal, "I Come From Brooklyn"			Multiple New York representatives Contestants competed under local title at Miss America pageant
1947	Carol Fredericks	Harrison		Miss New York	Tap Dance			Multiple New York representatives Contestants competed under local title at Miss America pageant
1947	Raven Malone	New York City		Miss New York City	Vocal, "Put the Blame on Mame"	Top 15	Preliminary Swimsuit Award	Multiple New York representatives Contestants competed under local title at Miss America pageant
1946	Violet Mellar	White Plains		Miss New York	Recitation, "True to the End"	Top 16	Miss Congeniality	Multiple New York representatives Contestants competed under local title at Miss America pageant
1946	Eileen Henry	New York City		Miss New York City	Dramatic Monologue from Saint Joan	Top 16	Preliminary Swimsuit Award	Multiple New York representatives Contestants competed under local title at Miss America pageant
1945	June Jenkins	Elmont		Miss New York				Multiple New York representatives Contestants competed under local title at Miss America pageant
1945	Bess Myerson		21	Miss New York City	Piano & Flute, "Piano Concerto in A Minor" & "Summertime"	Winner	Preliminary Swimsuit Award Preliminary Talent Award (tie)	First Jewish American to win Miss America pageant First New York titleholder to be named Miss America
1944	Bobby MacAdam	Brooklyn		Miss New York				Multiple New York representatives Contestants competed under local title at Miss America pageant
1944	Betty Jo Dazey	New York City		Miss New York City	Vocal Medley, "Goodnight, Wherever You Are" & "Swinging on a Star"	Top 12		Multiple New York representatives Contestants competed under local title at Miss America pageant
1943	Marion Butler			Miss New York				Multiple New York representatives Contestants competed under local title at Miss America pageant
1943	Milena Miller	New York City		Miss New York City	Vocal, "I Can't Get Started Without You"	3rd runner-up		Multiple New York representatives Contestants competed under local title at Miss America pageant
1942	Catherine Victoria Zambon			Miss Central New York				Multiple New York representatives Contestants competed under local title at Miss America pageant
1942	Marion Moselle	Utica		Miss New York			Preliminary Talent Award	Multiple New York representatives Contestants competed under local title at Miss America pageant
1942	Annyse Sherman	New York City		Miss New York City	Vocal, "My Hero" from The Chocolate Soldier	Top 10		Multiple New York representatives Contestants competed under local title at Miss America pageant
1941	Charlotte Winstanley			Miss Lake Mohopac				Multiple New York representatives Contestants competed under local title at Miss America pageant
1941	Grace DeWitt	New York City		Miss New York City		Top 15		Multiple New York representatives Contestants competed under local title at Miss America pageant
1941	Lillian O'Donnell	Yonkers		Miss Westchester County		3rd runner-up		Multiple New York representatives Contestants competed under local title at Miss America pageant
1940	Geraldine Anne Racine			Miss Eastern New York				Multiple New York representatives Contestants competed under local title at Miss America pageant
1940	Constantine Gray	Yonkers		Miss Westchester County				Multiple New York representatives Contestants competed under local title at Miss America pageant
1940	Gloria Elizabeth Sheehan	Buffalo		Miss Western New York				Multiple New York representatives Contestants competed under local title at Miss America pageant
1939	Grayce M. Reilly			Miss Coney Island				Multiple New York representatives Contestants competed under local title at Miss America pageant
1939	Clare E. Foley			Miss Eastern New York	Vocal Comedy & Dance	Top 15		Multiple New York representatives Contestants competed under local title at Miss America pageant
1939	Lillian Evelyn Hessen	Annadale		Miss Staten Island				Multiple New York representatives Contestants competed under local title at Miss America pageant
1938	Barbara Beech	Brooklyn		Miss Brooklyn		Top 15		Multiple New York representatives Contestants competed under local title at Miss America pageant
1938	Elissa Winston			Miss Empire State		Top 15		Multiple New York representatives Contestants competed under local title at Miss America pageant
1938	Marion Rosamund			Miss Long Island				Multiple New York representatives Contestants competed under local title at Miss America pageant
1938	Adeline Shull			Miss Long Island Sound				Multiple New York representatives Contestants competed under local title at Miss America pageant
1937	Helen Fleiss	The Bronx		Miss Bronx		Top 16		Multiple New York representatives Contestants competed under local title at Miss America pageant
1937	Dorothy Armstrong	Whitesboro		Miss Empire State				Multiple New York representatives Contestants competed under local title at Miss America pageant
1937	Grace Travis	New York City		Miss New York City	Vocal	Top 16	Preliminary Talent Award	Multiple New York representatives Contestants competed under local title at Miss America pageant
1937	Irene Alice Vanderburgh	Watervliet		Miss Troy				Multiple New York representatives Contestants competed under local title at Miss America pageant
1937	Evelyn Raye	New Rochelle		Miss Westchester County		Top 16		Multiple New York representatives Contestants competed under local title at Miss America pageant
1936	Evelyn Lemhart			Miss Long Island				Multiple New York representatives Contestants competed under local title at Miss America pageant
1936	Susan Georgianna Green	Bolwar		Miss Western New York				Multiple New York representatives Contestants competed under local title at Miss America pageant
1935	Grace Travis	Brooklyn		Miss Brooklyn	Piano			Multiple New York representatives Contestants competed under local title at Miss America pageant
1935	Vera Haal	The Bronx		Miss New York		Top 12		Multiple New York representatives Contestants competed under local title at Miss America pageant
1935	Laura Baker	Poughkeepsie		Miss Poughkeepsie				Multiple New York representatives Contestants competed under local title at Miss America pageant
1934	No national pageant was held							
1933	Florence Meyer		19	Miss New York		1st runner-up		
1933	Elsie Donath			Miss New York City		did not compete		Withdrew from competition and did not compete
1932	No national pageants were held							
1931	No national pageants were held							
1930	No national pageants were held							
1929	No national pageants were held							
1928	No national pageants were held							
1927	Kay Armstrong			Miss Buffalo				Multiple New York representatives Contestants competed under local title at Miss America pageant
1927	Name not known			Miss Central New York				Multiple New York representatives Contestants competed under local title at Miss America pageant
1927	Laura Belle Cooper			Miss Jamestown				Multiple New York representatives Contestants competed under local title at Miss America pageant
1927	Peggy Louise Proctor			Miss Lockport				Multiple New York representatives Contestants competed under local title at Miss America pageant
1927	Freida Louise Mierse			Miss New York City		Top 15		Multiple New York representatives Contestants competed under local title at Miss America pageant
1927	Name not known			Miss Riverside				Multiple New York representatives Contestants competed under local title at Miss America pageant
1927	Dorothea B. Ditner			Miss Rochester		Top 15		Multiple New York representatives Contestants competed under local title at Miss America pageant
1927	Margaret Lockwood			Miss Utica				Multiple New York representatives Contestants competed under local title at Miss America pageant
1927	Eva M. Bergman			Miss Watertown				Multiple New York representatives Contestants competed under local title at Miss America pageant
1927	Betty Schwartz			Miss Western New York				Multiple New York representatives Contestants competed under local title at Miss America pageant
1927	Emma Sackett			Miss Yonkers				Multiple New York representatives Contestants competed under local title at Miss America pageant
1926	Florence Meyer			Miss Bay Ridge				Multiple New York representatives Contestants competed under local title at Miss America pageant
1926	Ruth K. Patterson			Miss Greater New York		Top 15		Multiple New York representatives Contestants competed under local title at Miss America pageant
1926	Name not known			Miss Oswego				Multiple New York representatives Contestants competed under local title at Miss America pageant
1926	Catherine Kennedy			Miss Yonkers		Top 15		Multiple New York representatives Contestants competed under local title at Miss America pageant
1925	Ethel Groesback			Miss Bay Ridge				Multiple New York representatives Contestants competed under local title at Miss America pageant
1925	Edith Higgins			Miss Bronx		Top 10		Multiple New York representatives Contestants competed under local title at Miss America pageant
1925	Peggy Moore			Miss Brooklyn				Multiple New York representatives Contestants competed under local title at Miss America pageant
1925	Alice Beatrice Roberts			Miss Greater New York		Top 10		Multiple New York representatives Contestants competed under local title at Miss America pageant
1925	Fern Jackson			Miss Syracuse		Top 10		Multiple New York representatives Contestants competed under local title at Miss America pageant
1925	Florence V. Andrews			Miss Watertown				Multiple New York representatives Contestants competed under local title at Miss America pageant
1925	Emma Soltis			Miss Westchester				Multiple New York representatives Contestants competed under local title at Miss America pageant
1925	Wilma Ansell			Miss Yonkers				Multiple New York representatives Contestants competed under local title at Miss America pageant
1925	Kathryn Ray			Miss Coney Island		did not compete		Withdrew from pageant
1925	Audrey Jean Austin			Miss Manhattan		did not compete		Withdrew from pageant
1924	Dorothea Kenna			Miss Bay Ridge				Multiple New York representatives Contestants competed under local title at Miss America pageant
1924	Frances Harten			Miss Bronx				Multiple New York representatives Contestants competed under local title at Miss America pageant
1924	Hildur Johnson			Miss Brooklyn				Multiple New York representatives Contestants competed under local title at Miss America pageant
1924	Agnes I. Leonard			Miss Coney Island				Multiple New York representatives Contestants competed under local title at Miss America pageant
1924	Margie Booth	Brooklyn		Miss Greater New York		Top 10		Multiple New York representatives Contestants competed under local title at Miss America pageant
1924	Alice Beatrice Roberts			Miss Manhattan		4th runner-up (tie)		Multiple New York representatives Contestants competed under local title at Miss America pageant
1924	Mary Griggs			Miss Newburgh				Multiple New York representatives Contestants competed under local title at Miss America pageant
1924	Mary Carlson			Miss Queens				Multiple New York representatives Contestants competed under local title at Miss America pageant
1924	Melise Danning			Miss Richmond				Multiple New York representatives Contestants competed under local title at Miss America pageant
1924	Katherine Skuse			Miss Rochester				Multiple New York representatives Contestants competed under local title at Miss America pageant
1924	Alma Jeanne Williams			Miss Syracuse				Multiple New York representatives Contestants competed under local title at Miss America pageant
1924	Hilda Farrell			Miss Watertown				Multiple New York representatives Contestants competed under local title at Miss America pageant
1924	Florence Kreisler			Miss Yonkers				Multiple New York representatives Contestants competed under local title at Miss America pageant
1923	Peggy Ross	Albany		Miss Albany	N/A			Multiple New York representatives Contestants competed under local title at national pageant
1923	Bonita C. Bement	Binghamton		Miss Binghamton	N/A			Multiple New York representatives Contestants competed under local title at national pageant
1923	Edithea Lois Wild	Brooklyn	15	Miss Brighton Beach	N/A			Multiple New York representatives Contestants competed under local title at national pageant
1923	Ethelda Kenvin	Brooklyn	24	Miss Brooklyn	N/A	1st runner-up	Roller Chair Parade Fifth Prize	Married baseball player, E.D. Barnes, in 1921
1923	Irene Knight	Buffalo		Miss Buffalo	N/A			Multiple New York representatives Contestants competed under local title at national pageant
1923	Heather Eulalie Walker	Coney Island		Miss Coney Island	N/A	2nd runner-up		Star of the lost musical film, Hit the Deck, opposite Jack Oakie
1923	Peggy Verna Shevlin	New York City		Miss New York City	N/A			Multiple New York representatives Contestants competed under local title at national pageant
1923	Nelda Tell	Niagara Falls		Miss Niagara Falls	N/A			Multiple New York representatives Contestants competed under local title at national pageant
1923	Reta Cowles	Rochester		Miss Rochester	N/A			Multiple New York representatives Contestants competed under local title at national pageant
1923	Eileen Snyder	Syracuse		Miss Syracuse	N/A		Evening Dress Award Runner-up	Multiple New York representatives Contestants competed under local title at national pageant
1922	Helen Agnes Searles	Binghamton		Miss Binghamton	N/A			Multiple New York representatives Contestants competed under local title at national pageant
1922	Ruth Andrea	Brighton Beach		Miss Brighton Beach	N/A			Multiple New York representatives Contestants competed under local title at national pageant
1922	Bertha Rent	Buffalo		Miss Buffalo	N/A			Multiple New York representatives Contestants competed under local title at national pageant
1922	Lillian Harnach	Long Beach		Miss Long Beach	N/A			Multiple New York representatives Contestants competed under local title at national pageant
1922	Pauline Virginia Dakla			Miss New York	N/A		Professional Beauty Award Second Prize	Appeared in the Broadway productions of Bombo, The Passing Show of 1922, and The Whirl of New York
1922	Dorothy Knapp	New York City	17	Miss New York City	N/A	1st runner-up	Professional Beauty Award	Multiple New York representatives Contestants competed under local title at national pageant
1922	Mildred Moon	Rochester		Miss Rochester	N/A			Multiple New York representatives Contestants competed under local title at national pageant
1922	Dorothy Hughes	Rockaway Beach		Miss Rockaway Beach	N/A		Intercity Beauty Award Third Prize	Multiple New York representatives Contestants competed under local title at national pageant
1922	Roberta Cooper	Schenectady		Miss Schenectady	N/A			Multiple New York representatives Contestants competed under local title at national pageant
1922	Mary Hlavka	South Beach		Miss South Beach	N/A			Multiple New York representatives Contestants competed under local title at national pageant
1922	M. Rosamond Fahey	Syracuse		Miss Syracuse	N/A			Multiple New York representatives Contestants competed under local title at national pageant
1922	Janette Adams	Utica		Miss Utica	N/A			Multiple New York representatives Contestants competed under local title at national pageant
1921	Virginia Lee	New York City	20	Miss New York City	N/A		Professional Beauty Award Endicott Trophy	Competed as Miss New York City at national pageant
