= Miss Michigan's Teen =

- Formation: 2005
- Type: Scholarship Program
- Location: Muskegon, Michigan
- Members: Miss America's Teen
- Official language: English
- Key people: Peggy Lotridge(Director)
- Website: Official website

For the state pageant affiliated with Miss America's Outstanding Teen, see Miss Michigan's Outstanding Teen

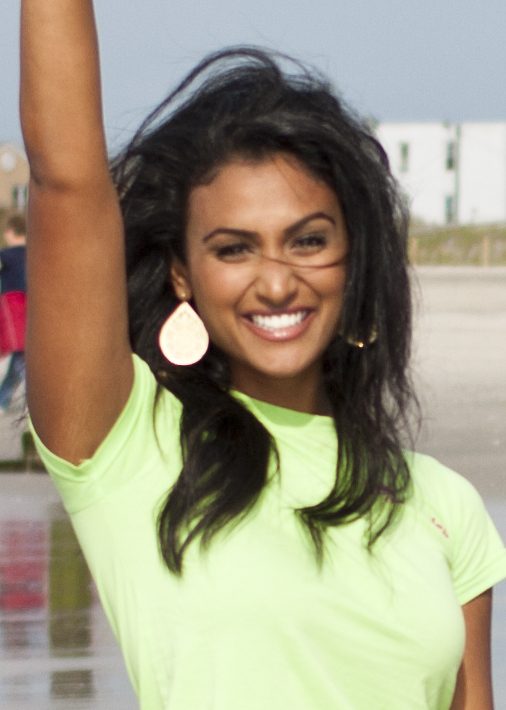
Nina Davuluri, Miss Michigan's Outstanding Teen 2006 and Miss America 2014

The Miss Michigan's Teen competition is the pageant that selects the representative from the U.S. state of Michigan in the Miss America's Teen pageant.

Maggie-Mae Nixon of Ann Arbor was crowned Miss Michigan's Teen on June 19, 2026, at the Frauenthal Theatre in Muskegon. She competed for the title of Miss America's Teen 2027 on September 5, 2026, at the Kravis Center for the Performing Arts in West Palm Beach, Florida.

== Results summary ==
The year in parentheses indicates year of Miss America's Outstanding Teen competition the award/placement was garnered.

=== Placements ===
- 1st runners-up: Nina Davuluri (2007), Marissa Cowans (2012)
- 4th runners-up: Katie Preston (2018)
- Top 10: Brooke Rowland (2011)
- Top 12: Alisha Gatchel (2015)

=== Awards ===
==== Preliminary awards ====
- Preliminary Evening Wear/On-Stage Question: Nina Davuluri (2007)
- Preliminary Talent: Julia Smith (2014), Katie Preston (2018)
- Preliminary Lifestyle and Fitness: Julia Smith (2014)

==== Non-finalist awards ====
- Non-finalist Talent: Julia Smith (2014)

==== Other awards ====
- Scholastic Excellence: Brooke Rowland (2011)
- Outstanding Dance Talent: Julia Smith (2014)
- Outstanding Vocal Talent: Katie Preston (2018)

== Winners ==
- Declared as Winner
- Ended as a runner-up
- Ended as a finalist or semi-finalist

| Year | Name | Hometown | Age | Local title | Talent | Placement at MAO Teen | Special scholarships at MAO Teen | Notes |
|---|---|---|---|---|---|---|---|---|
| 2026 | Maggie-Mae Nixon | Ann Arbor | 17 | Miss Saginaw County's Teen | Violin Performance to "Phantom Of The Opera" | | | |
| 2025 | Libbie Tacia | Big Rapids | 17 | Miss Saginaw County's Teen | Contemporary Dance, "It's All Coming Back To Me Now" | | | |
| 2024 | Isabelle Lorraine Musk | Twin Lake | 18 | Miss Shoreline's Teen | Contemporary Dance | | | |
| 2023 | Kylie D'Andrea | St. Clair Shores | 18 | Miss Sunrise Side‘s Teen | Jazz Dance | | | |
| 2022 | Grace Larsen | Coloma | 17 | Miss Spirit of the State's Outstanding Teen | Musical Theater Dance | | | |
| 2021 | Rylie Dewley | Grand Blanc | 17 | Miss Washtenaw County's Outstanding Teen | Baton Twirling, "Let's Get Loud" | | | Top 13 at Miss Alabama 2023 Miss Heart of Dixie 2024 |
| 2019-20 | Madison McElvany | Monroe | 16 | Miss South Central's Outstanding Teen | Contemporary Dance, "Sarajevo" | | | |
| 2018 | Maria Evola | Macomb | 15 | Miss Saginaw County's Outstanding Teen | Dance, "Maria" from West Side Story | | | |
| 2017 | Katie Preston | Bridgman | 17 | Miss Sunset Coast's Outstanding Teen | Vocal | 4th runner-up | Outstanding Vocal Award Preliminary Talent Award | Performed "The Star-Spangled Banner" at Thursday night's preliminary competition during Miss America 2018 pageant |
| 2016 | Kendra Lodewyk | Bay City | 14 | Miss Auburn/Midland's Outstanding Teen | Vocal, "Ave Maria" by Franz Schubert | | | Younger sister of Miss Michigan 2024, Janae Lodewyk |
| 2015 | Vanessa Chambe | St. Clair Shores | 17 | Miss Downriver's Outstanding Teen | Tap Dance, "Mr. Pinstripe Suit" | | | Top 10 at Miss Michigan 2022 |
| 2014 | Alisha Gatchel | Greenville | 16 | Miss Spirit of the State's Outstanding Teen | Piano/Vocal | Top 12 | | |
| 2013 | Julia Smith | Sterling Heights | 14 | Miss Mid Michigan's Outstanding Teen | Dance | | Non-finalist Talent Award Outstanding Dance Talent Award Preliminary Lifestyle & Fitness Award Preliminary Talent Award | |
| 2012 | Sabrina Jeffrey | Bay City | 14 | Miss Saginaw County's Outstanding Teen | | | | |
| 2011 | Marissa Cowans | St. Clair Shores | 17 | Miss St. Clair Shores' Outstanding Teen | Jazz Dance | 1st runner-up | | |
| 2010 | Brooke Rowland | Portage | 17 | Miss Kalamazoo County's Outstanding Teen | Harp | Top 10 | Scholastic Excellence Award | |
| 2009 | Haley Williams | Saline | 16 | At-Large | Twirl/Dance | | | Later Miss Michigan 2013 |
| 2008 | Carleigh Corrion-Rowley | Essexville | 14 | Miss Oakland County's Outstanding Teen | Dance, "It's Oh So Quiet" | | | |
| 2007 | Madelynne Wagner | Rockford | | | | | | |
| 2006 | Nina Davuluri | St. Joseph | 16 | Miss Southwest Michigan's Outstanding Teen | Modern Classical Indian Dance | 1st runner-up | Preliminary Evening Wear/OSQ Award | Later Miss New York 2013; Crowned Miss America 2014 |
| 2005 | Ashley Noelle Loader | Blissfield | 17 | | Ballet en Pointe | | | |
