= Maryalice Demler =

American journalist

- Born: Mary Alice Demler; July 8, 1964 (age 62); North Tonawanda, New York
- Education: Niagara University
- Occupation: News Anchor
- Height: 5 ft 7.5 in (1.71 m)
- Spouse: Nathan Roger Marton (m. 1996–January 2013)
- Beauty pageant titleholder
- Title: Miss New York 1990; Miss Buffalo 1990
- Hair color: Blonde
- Eye color: Blue
- Major competition: Miss America 1991

Maryalice Demler (born July 8, 1964) is a television journalist and news anchor for WGRZ in Buffalo, New York.

== Biography ==
Demler anchors Channel 2 News at 5:00, 6:00,7:00,10:00, and 11:00. She joined Channel 2 in September 1993. She attended Niagara University, graduating in 1986 with a B. A. in Political Science, and a B. A. in French. She won the title of Miss New York in 1990 and participated in Miss America 1991 on September 7, 1990. On April 18, 2010, The New York Chapter of the National Academy of Television Arts and Sciences honored Demler with the New York Emmy Award for the Best News Anchor - On Camera Talent category. She is the first Buffalo-area news Anchor to receive the Best News Anchor award. She has been the executive director of the Miss Buffalo Pageant for several years (Miss America Preliminary) and has taken her titleholders to Miss New York. She runs the Canal Fest Pageant of the Tonawandas and she ran the Miss Erie County Fair Pageant for several years. She is very involved in community service and is a journalist. She has been voted Western New York's favorite news anchor many times.

Demler was married to Nathan Marton from 1996 to 2013. She dated Joseph Murphy from 2018 until Murphy's unexpected death in February 2019.

Awards and achievements
| Preceded by Lisa Marie Molella | Miss New York; 1990 | Succeeded by Marisol Montalvo |
