= Claire Buffie =

American photographer (born 1986)

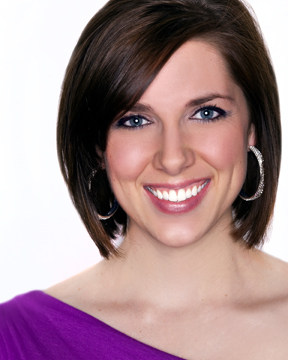
- Photograph by Claire Buffie herself
- Born: Claire Buffie; May 15, 1986 (age 40); Indianapolis, Indiana, U.S.
- Occupation: Photographer
- Height: 5 ft 9 in (1.75 m)
- Beauty pageant titleholder
- Title: Miss Duneland 2007 (IN); Miss Central Indiana 2008 (IN); Miss Jubilee 2009; Miss Southeast New York 2010; Miss New York 2010
- Hair color: Brunette
- Eye color: Blue
- Major competition: Miss America 2011 (top 12)
- Website: www.clairebuffiephotography.com

Claire Buffie (born May 15, 1986) is an American photographer. As Miss New York 2010, she was the first Miss America contestant to advocate a gay-rights platform at the Miss America 2011 pageant (where she placed in the top 12).

== Background ==
A BSU Presidential Scholar and Emens scholar, Buffie earned a Bachelor of Fine Arts degree in visual communications from Ball State University in 2008, with a concentration in photography and a minor in dance performance. During her academic career she received numerous awards and honors. After interning with Lois Greenfield and Macfadden Publications (publisher of Dance Magazine and Pointe), she began designing professionally for movmnt magazine. She has owned and operated her own photography and design business since 2005. She began working for Apple Inc. in 2010.

Buffie competed in the Miss Indiana 2008 contest, earning second runner-up to Miss Indiana 2008 winner, Katie Stam (Miss America 2009), and was a preliminary swimsuit and interview winner. After moving to New York, she competed in Miss New York 2009 pageant, winning preliminary swimsuit, evening gown and overall interview. The next year, she was crowned Miss Southeast New York, and won the Miss New York 2010 title with the platform "Straight for Equality: Let's Talk".

Buffie is the writer of a children's poem book called Babies, Biscuits, Bears, and Seashore Fun, and an active volunteer in New York's Safe Schools Program, which helps schools reduce bullying and harassment based on sexual orientation and gender identity.

Awards and achievements
Preceded by Alyse Zwick	Miss New York; 2013	Succeeded by Kaitlin Monte
