= Dick Talens =

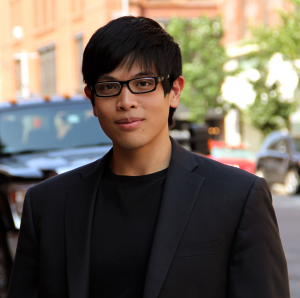
- Born: April 1, 1986 (age 40)
- Occupations: Entrepreneurship, fitness coach
- Known for: Fitocracy, Miss America 2013
- Website: dicktalens.com

Richard Talens is an entrepreneur and fitness coach. He is the founder of Fitocracy, an online game and social network with over 10 million users. According to The Economist, Talens came up with the idea of Fitocracy from his past as a geek who played MMORPGs.

== Career ==
Besides being an entrepreneur, Talens also speaks and writes about his experience as a fitness coach and a growth hacker.

Talens was Mallory Hagan's fitness coach on her road to becoming Miss America 2013. Talens is also a regular fitness contributor for popular outlets like Lifehacker and Thrillist and has spoken about his fitness experience through TEDx.

Talens also writes about his extensive experience scaling companies as a growth marketer.

== Dating ==
Talens has been written about in various outlets and books for his prolific dating history. Lulu listed him as one of the top 10 rated men of 2014 and Mashable has written about his ability to get to sex in 10 texts or less. This is further discussed in former Fox News Host Andrea Tantaros's book, Tied Up in Knots: How Getting What We Wanted Made Women Miserable.

== Education ==
Talens has a B.S. in Managing E-Commerce from the Wharton School at the University of Pennsylvania.

== Child pornography indictment ==
On August 16, 2024, Talens was referred to secondary inspection by U.S. Customs and Border Protection at Washington Dulles Airport, whereupon he was found to have internationally transported child sexual abuse material. When questioned by Homeland Security Washington D.C. Special Agents, Talens admitted that he purchased and watched child pornography.

Talens has pleaded guilty to the charge of Internationally Transporting Child Sexual Abuse Materials in Federal Court following an investigation by U.S. Customs and Border Protection.
