= Miss America 1976 =

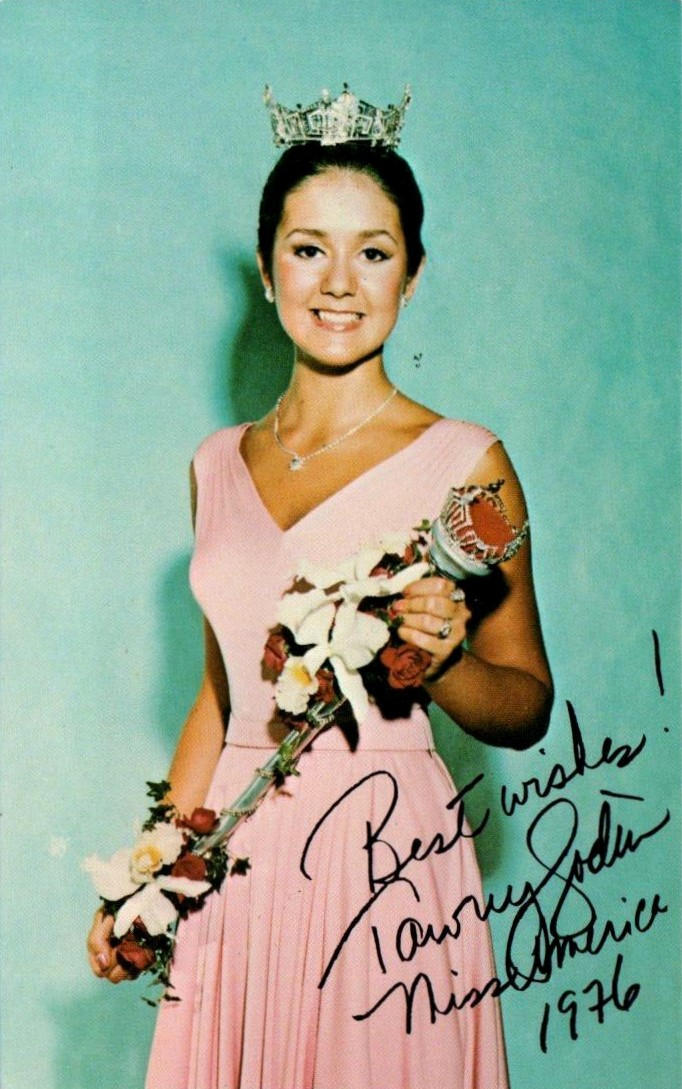
- Tawny Godin, Miss America 1976
- Date: September 6, 1975
- Presenters: Bert Parks; Phyllis George
- Venue: Boardwalk Hall, Atlantic City, New Jersey
- Broadcaster: NBC
- Winner: Tawny Godin; New York state

Miss America 1976, the 49th Miss America pageant, was held at the Boardwalk Hall in Atlantic City, New Jersey on September 6, 1975, and broadcast on NBC.

The winner, Tawny Godin, representing New York, later became better known as Tawny Little, a television personality in Los Angeles who married actor John Schneider, star of the TV series The Dukes of Hazzard. She was the first woman with the title of Miss New York to take the crown, Bess Myerson having won the 1945 pageant entered as Miss New York City. At 5 ft 10 1/2 in (1.79 m), Godin was the tallest Miss America to that point.

== Result ==
=== Placements ===
Placement	Contestant
Miss America 1976	New York – Tawny Godin
1st Runner-Up	North Carolina – Susan Lawrence
2nd Runner-Up	California – Janet Carr
3rd Runner-Up	Ohio – Susan Banks
4th Runner-Up	Arizona – Stacey Petersen
Top 10	Florida – Ann Schmalzried; Indiana – Cyndi Legler; Massachusetts – Cynthia Mary Carpenter; South Carolina – Cyndi Anthony; Texas – Mary Ellen Richardson

=== Awards ===
==== Preliminary awards ====
Awards	Contestant
Lifestyle and Fitness	California - Janet Carr; Arkansas - Paula Denise Roach; Rhode Island - Debra Jean Cusick
Talent	Massachusetts - Cynthia Mary Carpenter; Montana - Diane Lynn Pacini; Ohio - Susan Banks

=== Other awards ===
Awards	Contestant
Non-finalist Talent	Delaware - Elaine Campanelli; (Georgia (U.S. state)) Georgia - Seva Celeste Day; Kentucky - Marsha Ann Griffith; Maryland - Veronica Marie Clarke; Minnesota - Keri Thorne; Pennsylvania - Connie Harness; Wisconsin - Marilyn Sembell; Wyoming - Trish Long
