= Miss America 1945 =

Beauty pageant

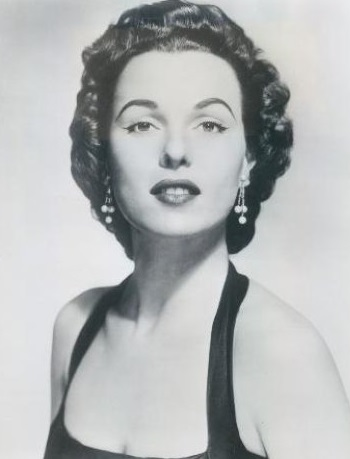
- Date: September 8, 1945
- Presenters: Bob Russell
- Venue: Boardwalk Hall, Atlantic City, New Jersey
- Entrants: 41
- Placements: 13
- Winner: Bess Myerson; New York City

Miss America 1945, the 19th Miss America pageant, was held at Boardwalk Hall in Atlantic City, New Jersey on September 8, 1945. Two days prior to the actual selection and coronation, the night of the talent competition, the Army Air Force Veterans voted the eventual winner, Miss New York City (Bess Myerson) as their favorite beauty queen.

== Overview ==
Bess Myerson was the first Jewish-American and the first Miss New York (competing as Miss New York City, a competition organized by a local radio station) to win the Miss America Pageant as Miss America 1945. As the only Jewish contestant, Myerson was encouraged by the pageant directors to change her name to "Bess Meredith" or "Beth Merrick" but she refused. After winning the title (and as a Jewish Miss America), Myerson received few endorsements and later recalled that "I couldn't even stay in certain hotels [...] there would be signs that read no coloreds, no Jews, no dogs. I felt so rejected. Here I was chosen to represent American womanhood and then America treated me like this." Consequently, she curtailed her Miss America tour and instead embarked on a journey with the Anti-Defamation League. In this capacity, she spoke against discrimination in a talk entitled, "You Can't Be Beautiful and Hate."

== Results ==
=== Placements ===
| Placement | Contestant |
|---|---|
| Miss America 1945 | New York City – Bess Myerson |
| 1st Runner-Up | San Diego – Phyllis Mathis |
| 2nd Runner-Up | Birmingham – Frances Dorn |
| 3rd Runner-Up | Florida – Virginia Freeland |
| 4th Runner-Up | Minnesota – Arlene Anderson |
| Top 13 | California – Polly Ellis; Chicago – Louise Wieland; District of Columbia – Dorothy Louise Powell; Maryland – Virginia Lee Van Sant; North Carolina – Dorothy Louise Johnson; Philadelphia – Gloria Bair; Tennessee – Lee Harriet Henson; Texas – Polly Below |

=== Awards ===
==== Preliminary awards ====
| Award | Contestant |
|---|---|
| Lifestyle and Fitness | Chicago – Louise Wieland; New York City – Bess Myerson; Tennessee – Lee Harriet Henson |
| Talent | Birmingham – Frances Dorn (tie); California – Polly Ellis; Minnesota – Arlene Anderson; New York City – Bess Myerson (tie) |

=== Other awards ===
| Awards | Contestant |
|---|---|
| Miss Congeniality | Northern British Columbia – Georgina E. Patterson |

== Contestants ==
The Miss America 1945 contestants were:

| Represented | Name | Hometown | Age | Talent | Placement | Awards | Notes |
|---|---|---|---|---|---|---|---|
| Arkansas | Leslie Hampton | Lake Village | 18 | | | | |
| Atlanta | Pauline Walker | Atlanta | 18 | | | | |
| Birmingham | Frances Lanell Dorn | Birmingham | 18 | | 2nd runner-up | Preliminary Talent Award (tie) | |
| Boston | Claire Thibadeau | Cambridge | 19 | | | | |
| California | Polly Ellis | Tarzana | 19 | | Top 13 | Preliminary Talent Award | |
| Chicago | Louise Wieland | Chicago | 19 | | Top 13 | Preliminary Swimsuit Award | |
| Cincinnati | Virginia Lee Pleasant | Portsmouth | 20 | | | | |
| Connecticut | Sylvia K. Shaw | Hartford | 20 | | | | |
| Detroit | Barbara Lee Smith | Detroit | 20 | | | | |
| District of Columbia | Dorothy Louise Powell | District of Columbia | 21 | | Top 13 | | |
| Florida | Virginia Freeland | Miami | 19 | | 3rd runner-up | | |
| Georgia | Doris Joyce Coker | Columbus | 18 | | | | |
| Illinois | Beverly Ann Long | Joliet | 18 | | | | |
| Indiana | Betty Anna Lackyear | Evansville | 20 | | | | |
| Iowa | Jeanne Gordon | Des Moines | 19 | | | | |
| Maine | Virginia Trask | Portland | 18 | | | | |
| Maryland | Virginia Lee Van Sant | Cumberland | 20 | | Top 13 | | |
| Massachusetts | Ruth Claire Thomas | Belmont | 18 | | | | |
| Miami Beach | Rae Evelyn Crist | Miami Beach | 19 | | | | |
| Michigan | Theresa Mary Sullivan | Detroit | 19 | | | | |
| Minnesota | Arlene Anderson | Minneapolis | 19 | | 4th runner-up | Preliminary Talent Award | |
| Mississippi | Harriet Jane Carr | Marks | 21 | | | | |
| Missouri | Betty Ruth Ream | Hughesville | 19 | | | | |
| New Hampshire | Margorie Lundfelt | Spofford Lake | 19 | | | | |
| New Jersey | Matilda Agin | New Brunswick | 20 | | | | |
| New Orleans | Helen Shively | New Orleans | 21 | | | | |
| New York City | Bess Myerson | New York City | 21 | Piano & Flute, "Grieg's Piano Concerto In A Minor" & "Summertime" | Winner | Preliminary Talent Award (tie) Preliminary Swimsuit Award | |
| New York | June Jenkins | Elmont | 18 | | | | |
| North Carolina | Dorothy Louise Johnson | Winston-Salem | 21 | | Top 13 | | |
| Northern British Columbia | Georgina E. Patterson | British Columbia, Canada | 19 | | | Miss Congeniality | |
| Ohio | Julia Ann Donahue | Oxford | 19 | | | | |
| Pennsylvania | Timmy Weston | McKeesport | 18 | | | | |
| Philadelphia | Gloria Bair | Philadelphia | 19 | | Top 13 | | |
| Rhode Island | Mary Stevens | Cranston | 24 | | | | |
| San Diego | Phyllis Mathis | San Diego | 19 | | 1st runner-up | | |
| South Carolina | Margaret Neeley | Columbia | 19 | | | | |
| Tennessee | Lee Harriet Henson | Chattanooga | 18 | | Top 13 | Preliminary Swimsuit Award | |
| Texas | Polly Below | Galveston | 18 | | Top 13 | | |
| Utah | Dorothy F. Holohan | Salt Lake City | 21 | | | | |
| Vermont | Mary Staikos | Burlington | 21 | | | | |
| Wisconsin | Eileen Christy | Menomonie | 20 | | | | |
