= Fitocracy =

Fitness social network

Fitocracy, Inc.
- Company type: Private
- Website type: Social networking
- Available in: English
- Founded: New York City, New York, United States
- Headquarters: New York City, New York, {{{location_country}}}
- Area served: Worldwide
- Key people: Dick Talens, co-founder; Brian Wang, co-founder
- Website: www.fitocracy.com
- Registration: Required
- Users: 12,500,000
- Launched: February 2011; 15 years ago
- Current status: Inactive

Fitocracy was an online game and social network that aims to use gamification to help users improve their fitness. It has received coverage from mainstream media sources.

== History ==
Fitocracy was founded by Dick Talens and Brian Wang. Both were self-described computer nerds who had succeeded in improving their own fitness and decided that game mechanics could help others to do the same.

Fitocracy launched in February 2011, using an invite system to control new user signups. Invite codes were initially distributed through sites such as Reddit.

In November 2011, the site introduced advertising, along with a paid option, known as Fitocracy Hero, which was ad-free and offered additional features. By then, Fitocracy claimed to have 120,000 users and a waiting list of a further 120,000.

In January 2012, Fitocracy began a partnership with Red Bull in which the site would be used to host the Red Bull Fitness Challenge.

By the end of January 2012, Fitocracy claimed a user base of 230,000 registered members.

In March 2012, Fitocracy launched an app for iOS devices.

In January 2013, Fitocracy launched an app for Android.

In March 2013, Fitocracy reached one million users and announced a collaboration with Arnold Schwarzenegger, which challenges users to exercise for 15 minutes per day.

In August 2014, Fitocracy was listed as one of Time's Best Websites of 2014.

Fitocracy was acquired in 2016 by an unnamed buyer.

In October 2017, it was announced that Fitocracy had reached 12.5 million active users.

As of August 2024, Fitocracy's website was offline.

== Game ==
The Fitocracy game interface

Fitocracy users log their exercise activity by selecting from a collection of activities such as weight lifting or running and entering details such as weight lifted or distance run. Points are awarded based on the estimated fitness benefit of each activity. Users must reach points thresholds in order to level up.

=== Quests and achievements ===
The site presents users with quests to perform for additional points, typically consisting of a set of related activities. Particularly significant fitness milestones are recognized with achievement badges.

=== Social networking ===
In addition to the game, Fitocracy also provides a social network which enables users to follow other users, view and comment on their workouts and join groups for specific interests.

== Reception ==
Fitocracy was initially covered by technology and gaming focused media, such as TechCrunch, Slate, Lifehacker, Kotaku, and Destructoid. As it grew, it was covered by more mainstream media, including Popular Mechanics, The New York Observer, CNN, The New York Times and The Globe and Mail.

=== 2012 Shorty Awards ===
Fitocracy was nominated in the 2012 Shorty Awards. Although it received the most votes in its category, Social Fitness, it was not selected as the winner by the judges.
