= Tawny Little =

American journalist (born 1956)

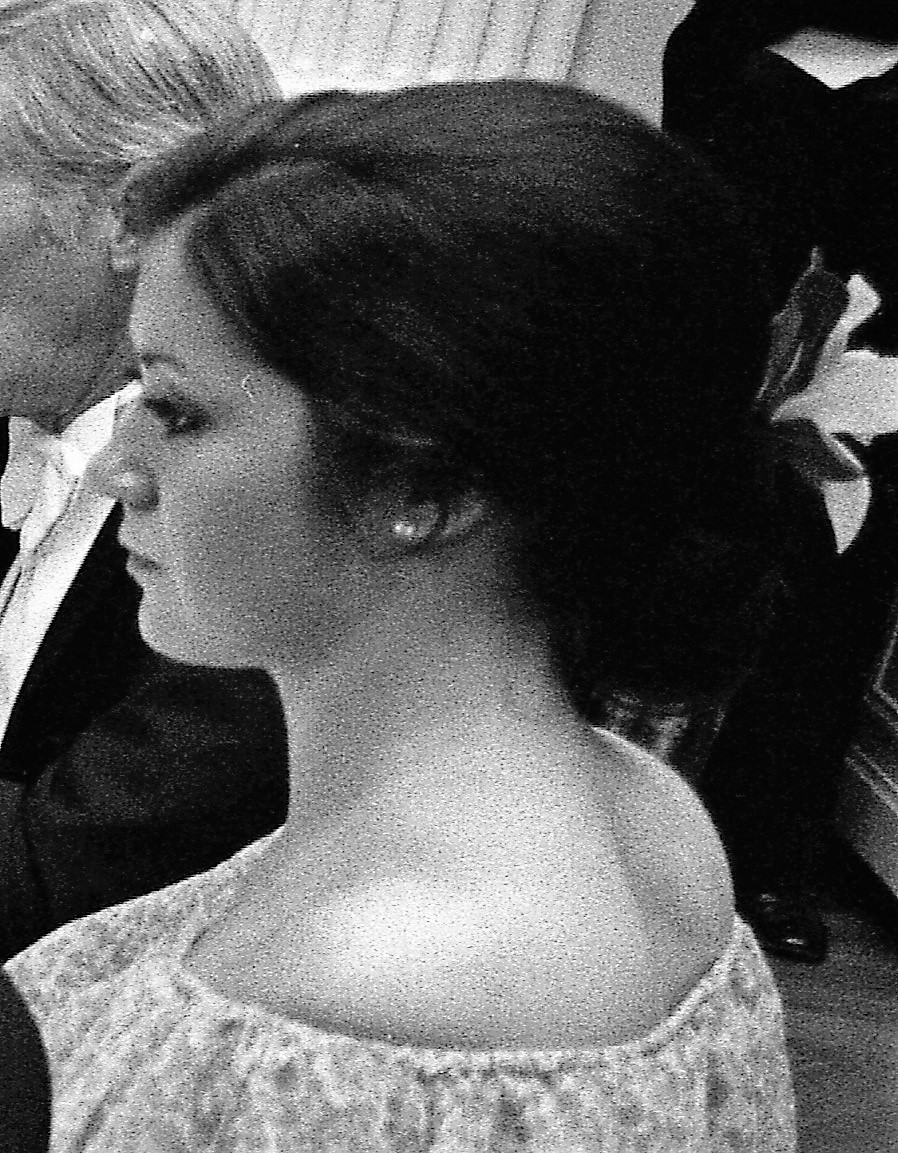
- Godin at a 1976 state dinner
- Born: Tawny Elaine Godin; September 15, 1956 (age 70); Portland, Maine, U.S.
- Occupations: Anchorwoman; talk show host
- Title: Miss New York 1975; Miss America 1976
- Predecessor: Shirley Cothran
- Successor: Dorothy Benham
- Spouses: Miles Little, M.D. (m. 1977; div. 1981) John Schneider (m. 1983; div. 1986) Don Corsini (m. 1986; div. 1999) Rick Welch (m. 2000; died 2014)
- Children: 3

Tawny Little (née Godin; born September 15, 1956), Miss America 1976 and Miss New York 1975, is an American beauty pageant winner and retired television personality.

== Early life and education ==
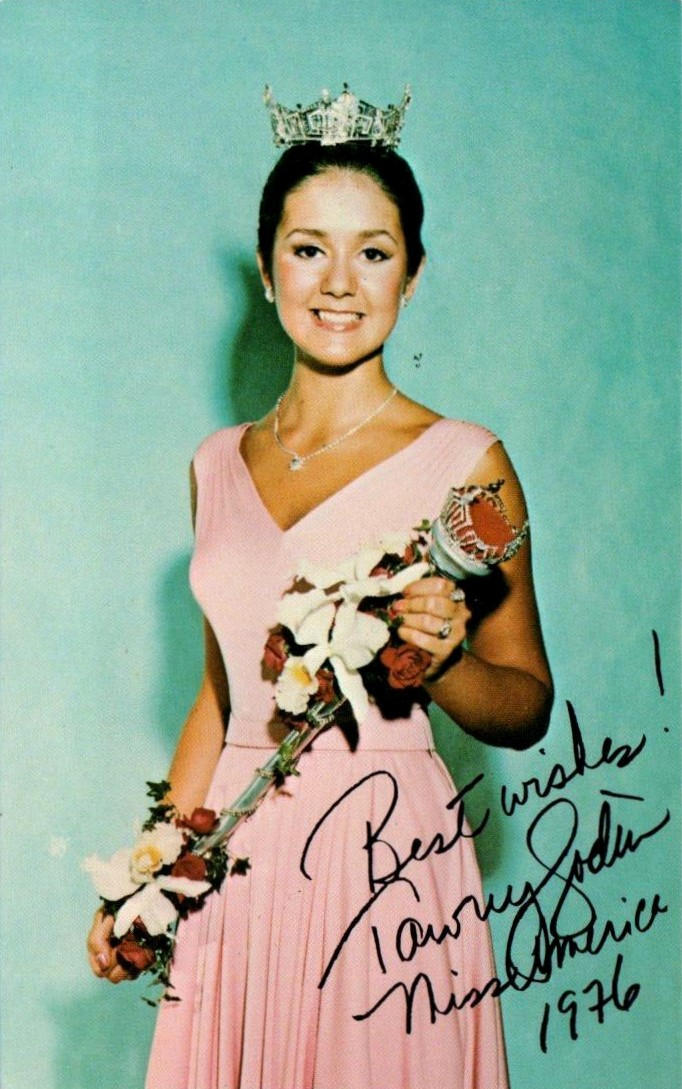
Godin as Miss America 1976

Godin was born in Portland, Maine. She was raised in Yonkers, New York and Toronto, Ontario, Canada. She became involved with the Miss New York pageant to raise tuition for Skidmore College but dropped out after she became Miss America. She later studied at the University of Southern California.

== Career ==
Little was a reporter and anchor with three Los Angeles television stations beginning in 1977 with KABC-TV. At KABC-TV, she served as a reporter, Eyewitness News anchor and co-host with a number of shows such as AM Los Angeles, Eye on LA, Hollywood Close-up and The Love Report. After leaving KABC in 1992, Little joined KCAL-TV as a news anchor for Prime 9 News. Later, from 1995 to 1999, she became a co-anchor with KCOP-TV's UPN News 13. She also appeared in some films and television shows including Rocky II, T.J. Hooker, Hart to Hart and Benson.

== Personal life ==
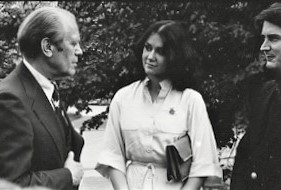
President Gerald Ford meets with Godin and her fiancé Miles Little in 1976.

She was a contestant on The $128,000 Question starring Mike Darow back in 1977 on the subject Shakespeare. On her final win, she won $8,000.

She changed her name to Little after marrying her first husband Miles Little, a neurosurgeon in Los Angeles (1977–1981). After her divorce from Little, she married The Dukes of Hazzard star John Schneider (1983–1986). This marriage also ended in divorce.

In 1986, Little married Don Corsini, general manager of KCBS-TV and KCAL-TV, with whom she had two sons, Joseph John, "J.J." (born 1987) and Chris (born 1989). She and Corsini divorced in 1999. She then married Los Angeles–based lawyer Rick Welch, with whom she had one son, Cole. They remained married until Welch's death in October 2014.
