= Mark Fisher Fitness =

Coordinates: 40.757066°N 73.994543°W

- Logo
- Industry: Fitness
- Founded: May 2011
- Founders: Mark Fisher and Michael Keeler
- Headquarters: 411 West 39th Street, Hell's Kitchen, Manhattan, New York City, USA
- Key people: Mark Fisher, Michael Keeler, Kyle Langworthy, Brian Patrick Murphy
- Website: markfisherfitness.com

Mark Fisher Fitness (MFF) is a boutique fitness center located in the Hell's Kitchen area of New York City. MFF offers classes, semi-private training, nutrition counseling and life coaching.

== History ==
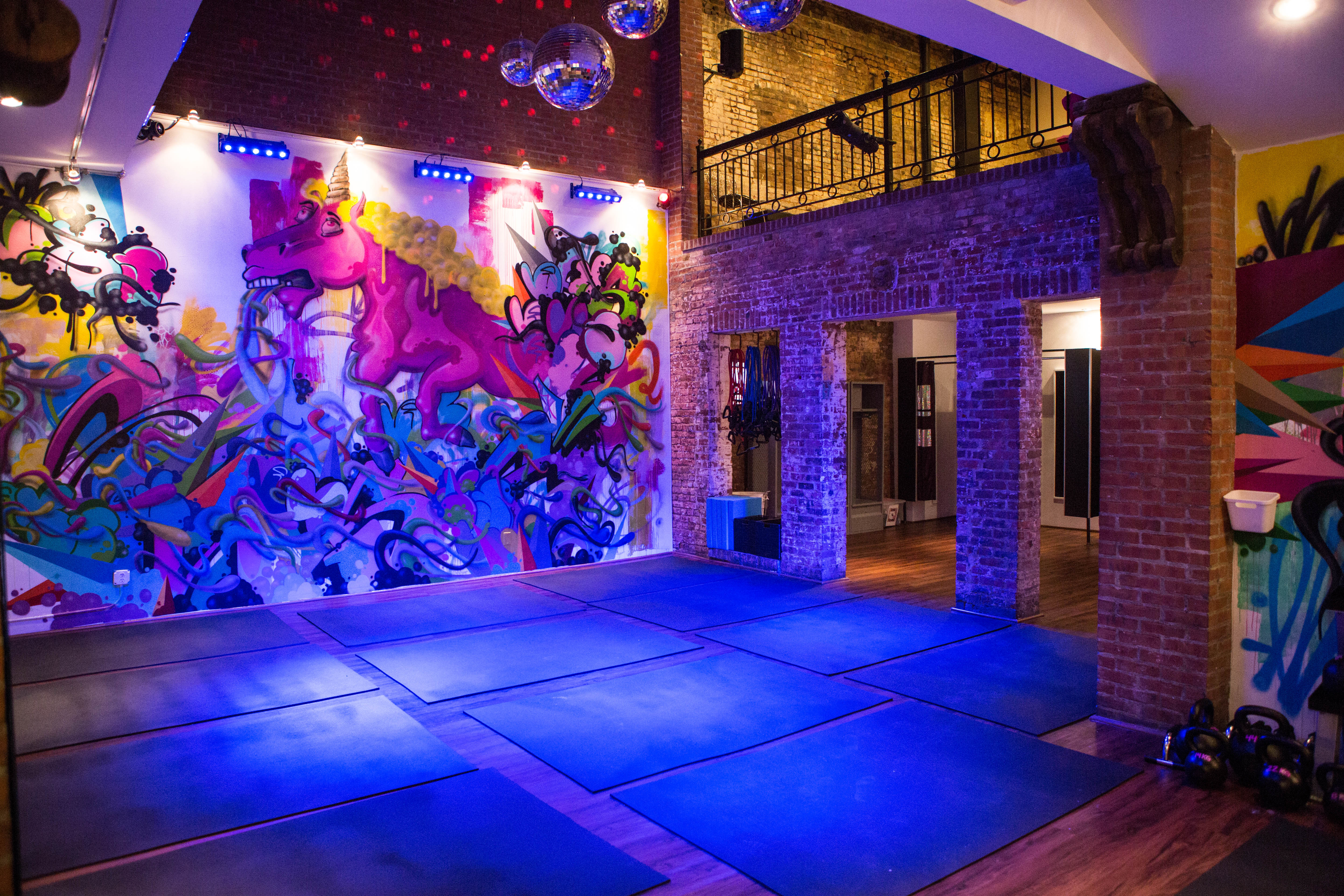
Interior view of The Snatchery at MFF

Mark Fisher Fitness began as a personal training business entity. Fisher began using the name Mark Fisher Fitness in the fall of 2010 with the launch of a newsletter, but the business did not become a corporate entity until May 2011. In June 2011, co-owner Michael Keeler joined Fisher as a business partner. Current head trainer Kyle Langworthy was hired to offer part-time training and Brian Patrick Murphy was hired to help teach classes.

The business began with a program called Snatched in Six Weeks, a six-week makeover program involving exercise classes and nutritional guidance. The classes took place in a rehearsal space in Roy Arias studios in Midtown Manhattan. The Snatched in Six Weeks program grew, and by January 2012 MFF opened their first "clubhouse" in Hell's Kitchen.

MFF currently has a membership training staff of 15, many who are certified RKC and SFG trainers. Within the first five years of opening, MFF membership increased tenfold and in 2015 MFF was named as one of Inc. magazine's 500 fastest growing companies in America.

== General information ==
MFF is also known for its place in the Broadway community where actors and dancers train for the physical demands of performing. Approximately two-thirds of their clientele are involved in entertainment, approximately half of which are performers, including several Tony Award winners, such as Billy Porter, Katie Finneran, Patina Miller and Jerry Mitchell.

Mark Fisher Fitness has been featured in publications like The New York Times, Men's Fitness and Women's Health for fitness techniques, and by outlets like Inc. magazine, Details and TEDxBroadway.

The MFF team launched the Movement and Motivation Lab in 2015, a two-day conference for fitness professionals.

== Community outreach ==
MFF and their clientele participate in the following community projects:

- Broadway Cares/Equity Fights AIDS (Broadway Bares Sponsor)
- Broadway Blows Back – Sponsor (All proceeds to victims of Hurricane Sandy)
- 39th Street Park Renovation Project (Theresa's Park) – Raised money and assisted in helping restore a community park.
- Kinky Boots and Mark Fisher Fitness raises money for Broadway Cares/Equity Fights AIDS with "These Boots Were Made for Rockin' at 54 Below!

In 2015, Mark Fisher Fitness founded the non-profit organization The Uprising, which exists to empower an army of everyday superheroes to rise up and make a difference in the health and vitality of New York City.
