= Kaitlin Monte =

American television personality and beauty pageant titleholder

- Born: February 7, 1989 (age 37)
- Citizenship: American
- Education: University of Tampa (BA), Clarkson University
- Occupation: Journalist
- Years active: 2011–2022
- Notable credits: Fox 26 News at 6, 9, & 10 Anchor (2016-2022); PIX Morning News Weekday Traffic Anchor (2014-2016); Mets Insider Host (2013-2014); Interactive Trivia Host, Today in New York (2012-2014)
- Height: 5 ft 6 in (1.68 m)
- Spouse: Chris Fohlin (m. 2016)
- Children: 3
- Website: kaitlinmonte.com

Kaitlin Monte is an American television news journalist who last worked for Fox-owned KRIV in Houston, TX. Monte joined KRIV in 2016 as a reporter and fill-in anchor.

Her television career began in New York City where she worked at WPIX, SportsNet New York, and WNBC.

== Early life and education ==
Monte grew up in Pittsford, New York, where she attended Pittsford Mendon High School until age 16. She then attended Clarkson University's Clarkson School, followed by the University of Tampa, where she studied performance and consumer psychology, graduating with her bachelor's degree in 2008.

== Entertainment career ==
In 2009, Monte became a performer for the USO Show Troupe, the official entertainment group for the United Services Organization which provides musical performances and entertainment for American military personnel and families.

Monte spent her early career in musical theater and earned membership to Actors Equity Association in 2010.

== Miss America ==
Monte competed in the Miss America 2012 competition, representing her home state as Miss New York 2011 and finishing second runner-up. Monte was awarded state and national lifestyle and fitness scholarships. She was one of eight national finalists for the AMWAY Quality of Life scholarship, which recognizes women for measurable civic impact during their year of service. Monte chose "Anti-Bullying through Leadership" as her personal platform, providing advocacy ranging from in-school presentations to legislative efforts.

== Television news career ==
=== WNBC (2012–2014) ===
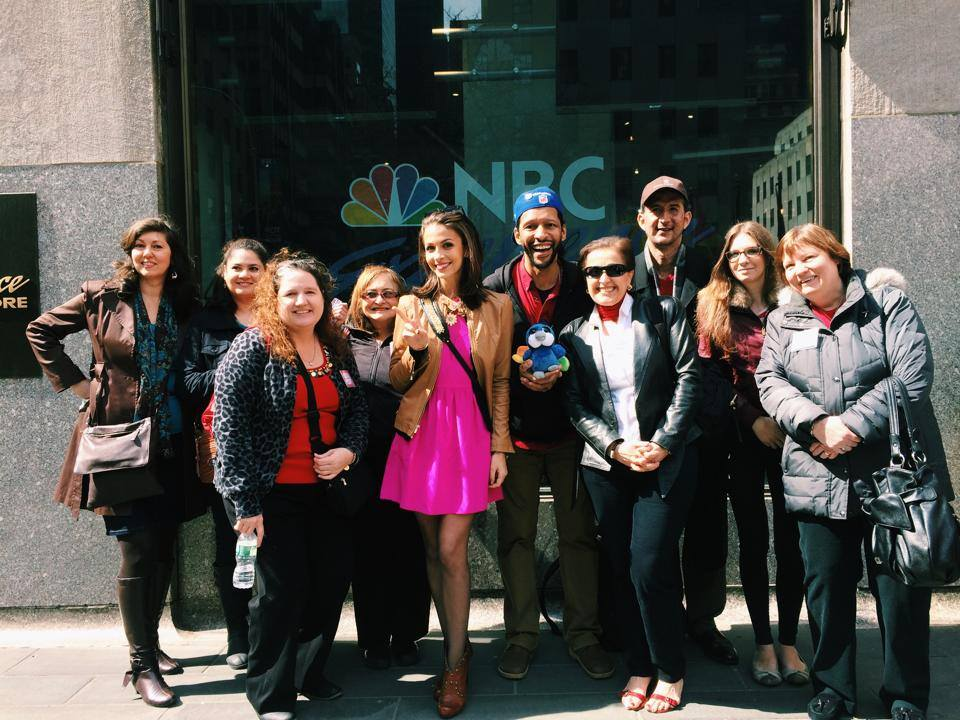
Monte poses with NBC New York trivia fans at Rockefeller Plaza, New York City

Monte's television experience began in 2012 as the interactive trivia host on WNBC's Today in New York. The 10-minute segment aired during the 9 o'clock hour and included a timed, 10-question round of trivia supplemented by online engagement with fans through social media and an interactive chat room.

=== SportsNet New York (2013–2014) ===
Monte was the host of Mets Insider on SportsNet New York for the 2013 and 2014 Mets seasons. The program was a bi-weekly, magazine-style show featuring episodes geared towards a diverse range of Mets topics.

=== WPIX (2014–2016) ===
In June, 2014 it was announced Monte would be the new weekday morning traffic reporter for PIX Morning News on WPIX. She reported on traffic conditions for the New York metro area weekday mornings from 5–9:00 a.m. and occasionally filled in on the anchor desk. Monte was nominated for, but did not win, a 2015 Emmy Award for On-Camera Talent (Transportation/Traffic).

Separately, Monte hosted a cocktail segment, "The Sip", on the WPIX-exclusive entertainment show Celebrity Tastemakers.

=== KRIV Houston (2016–2022) ===
Monte joined Fox owned-and-operated station KRIV in Houston, Texas in July 2016 as a general assignment reporter and fill-in anchor. In August, 2017 she became co-anchor of KRIV’s Fox 26 News at 5 p.m. and 9 p.m., the station’s weekday evening news programs.

At the time of her promotion to anchor, Monte was selected to solo anchor at 10:00 p.m. on The NewsEdge at 10, an all-new live 30-minute program touted as a faster-paced show. KRIV launched a second live weekday time slot at 6 p.m. for The Newsedge brand in 2020, also solo-anchored by Monte.

== Charitable work ==
Growing up alongside two siblings with severe learning and cognitive disabilities led Monte to become an active advocate in the anti-bullying movement.

In 2011, Monte founded an online petition to bring the issue of cyberbullying (referred to as "Jamey's Law" after Jamey Rodemeyer of Buffalo, NY) to New York legislators. Shortly after, State Senator Jeffrey Klein proposed new cyberbullying legislation and the two joined forces along with Jamie Isaacs, to launch the New York Cyberbully Census. Monte has made guest appearances on MSNBC and Al Jazeera America discussing bullying-related issues, and was named the Anti-Defamation League No Place for Hate "Difference Maker of the Year" in 2012 for her "Anti-bullying Through Leadership" workshop series.

In 2015, Monte was appointed to the Board of Trustees for Clarkson University.
