= Averie Bishop =

American attorney and social activist

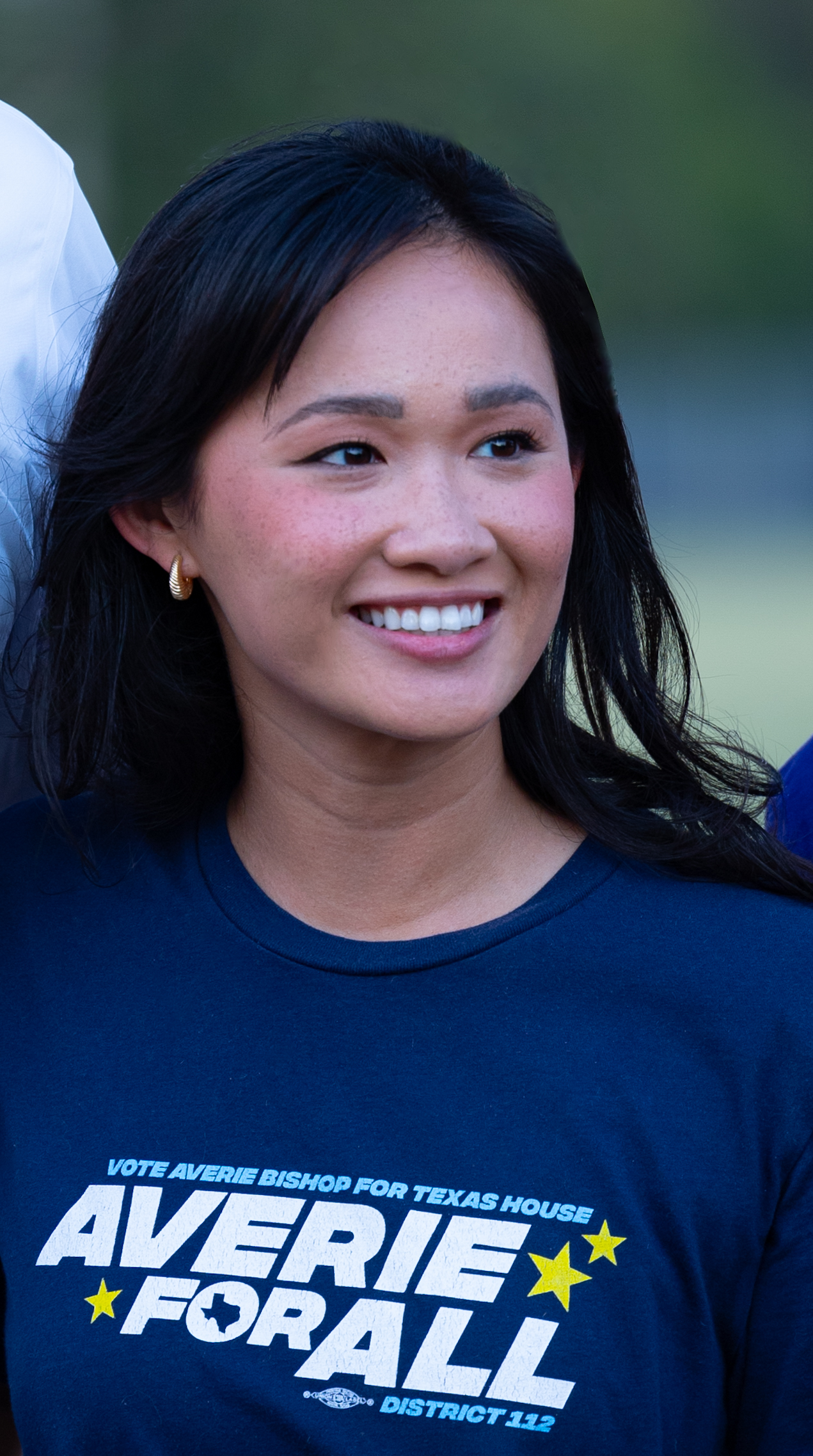
- Bishop in 2024
- Born: McKinney, Texas, U.S.
- Education: Southern Methodist University (BA, JD)
- Title: Miss Texas (2022)
- Political party: Democratic
- Website: Official website

Averie Bishop is a social activist who is the first Asian American woman to be crowned Miss Texas. Her work focuses on diversity, equity, and inclusion, and she co-founded a nonprofit supporting educational access for underserved communities.

She was the second-runner up at Miss America 2023, and ran as the Democratic Party's candidate for Texas's 112th House of Representatives district in the 2024 elections.

== Early life and education ==
Bishop was born in McKinney, Texas. Her mother, a Filipina immigrant from Banga, South Cotabato, Mindanao, worked as a maid and her father was a white and Cherokee bus driver. She attended public schools in the Prosper Independent School District. Since 2015, Bishop and her mother have run the Tulong Foundation, a nonprofit supporting education and accessibility to drinking water in impoverished communities in her mother's hometown of Banga, South Cotabato. By 2022, the foundation was sponsoring over 45 children.

Bishop initially majored in acting but later changed her major to human rights and sociology in light of the 2016 election results. She completed her bachelor's degree and J.D. at Southern Methodist University. While in law school, Bishop interned at a law firm in New York and for U.S. representative Sheila Jackson Lee. In 2020, she began using TikTok during her first semester of law school.

Bishop acquired nearly one million followers across social media for her educational content based on her experience as a first-generation college student. She shared tutorials, lessons, and candid confessions about the struggles of affording college. Bishop gained notoriety for her informal snack videos in her law school library where she broke down difficult legal topics.

== Career ==
She began competing in beauty pageants to earn scholarship money for school. In 2019, she won first competition, Miss Lufkin. She subsequently won Miss Dallas in 2020 and Miss Carrollton in 2021. In her third attempt, Bishop won the 2022 Miss Texas competition. She is the first Asian to win Miss Texas. At Miss America 2023, she was the second-runner up after Grace Stanke of Wisconsin and Taryn Delanie Smith of New York. She won US$20,000 (equivalent to $22,004 in 2025). She started a consulting business in January 2022.

Traditionally an apolitical position, during her year term as Miss Texas, Bishop's platform "Y’all Means All" advocated for diversity and inclusion and the need for comprehensive sex education in schools. She has also pushed for affordable health and reproductive care. She opposed the overturning of Roe v. Wade. Bishop lobbied Texas Republicans to consider the benefits of college diversity and inclusion programs before the Texas Legislature ultimately passed a ban. She supports student loan forgiveness. Bishop is a member of the Dallas Anti-Hate Advisory Council. In 2022, Bishop appeared in Miss Saigon alongside Lou Diamond Phillips at Casa Mañana.

On August 22, 2023, Bishop announced that she would run for Texas's 112th House of Representatives district in the 2024 elections. She won the Democratic primary unopposed on March 5, 2024, and faced incumbent Republican representative Angie Chen Button in the general election. Bishop received 47% of the vote, losing against Button's 53%.

Awards and achievements
Preceded by Mallory Fuller	Miss Texas; 2022	Succeeded by Ellie Breaux
