= Miss Wyoming =

Beauty pageant competition

- Formation: 1937
- Type: Beauty pageant
- Headquarters: Sheridan
- Location: Wyoming
- Members: Miss America
- Official language: English

Miss Wyoming is a state-level pageant that sends winners to compete for the title of Miss America. The competition, which awards scholarships, is open to women aged 19 through 28.

Wyoming is one of the few states, along with Maine, South Dakota, and West Virginia, that has yet to win a Miss America, Miss USA, or Miss Teen USA title.

Alyssa Medina of Cheyenne was crowned Miss Wyoming on June 6, 2026, at the WYO Performing Arts and Education Center in Sheridan, Wyoming. She will for the title of Miss America 2027.

== Results summary ==
The following is a visual summary of the past results of Miss Wyoming titleholders at the national Miss America pageants/competitions. The year in parentheses indicates the year of the national competition during which a placement and/or award was garnered, not the year attached to the contestant's state title.

=== Placements ===
- 1st runners-up: Carol Jean Held (1948)
- 3rd runners-up: Lexie Madden (2013)
- Top 10: Elaine Lois Holkenbrink (1953)
- Top 15: Dorothy June McKay (1947)

=== Awards ===
==== Preliminary awards ====
- Preliminary Lifestyle and Fitness: Elaine Lois Holkenbrink (1953)
- Preliminary Talent: N/A

==== Non-finalist awards ====
- Non-finalist Talent: Carol Rose (1969), Trish Long (1976), Carol June Wallace (1977), Kim Pring (1979)

==== Other awards ====
- Miss Congeniality: N/A
- Dr. David B. Allman Medical Scholarship: Cheryl Johnson (1975)
- Waterford Crystal Scholarship for Business Management and Marketing: Rebecca Darrington (1997)
- Women in Business Scholarship Award Finalists: Cheyenne Buyert (2018)
- Show Me Your Shoes Winner: Anna-Claire Musick (2026)

== Winners ==
- Declared as winner
- Ended as a runner-up
- Ended as a finalist or semi-finalist

Year	Name	Hometown	Age	Local Title	Miss America Talent	Placement at Miss America	Special scholarships at Miss America	Notes
2026	Alyssa Medina	Cheyenne	22	Miss Cheyenne	HER Story			
2025	Anna-Claire Musick	Cheyenne	27	Miss Cheyenne	Tap Dance to “Scatman”		Show Me Your Shoes Winner	Previously Distinguished Young Woman (DYW) of Edgecombe County 2015; Talent Award Winner and 2nd Runner Up at the 2015 Distinguished Young Woman of North Carolina; 2018 North Carolina Rhododendron Queen; Top 15 Finalist at 2019 Miss North Carolina Competition; Top 10 Finalist at 2021 Miss North Carolina Competition; Top 10 Finalist and People's Choice Winner at 2021 National Sweetheart Pageant; 4th Runner Up to Miss North Carolina 2022; Member of the 2023 North Carolina Azalea Festival Queen's Court
2024	Baylee Drewry	Basin	21	Miss University of Wyoming	HERStory, "Breath and Life"			Former Miss Wyoming Teen USA 2020
2023	Mackenzie Kern	Casper	23		HERStory			Former Miss Wyoming USA 2021 and Miss Wyoming Teen USA 2018
2022	Hazel Homer-Wambeam	Laramie	21	Miss University of Wyoming	Musical Theater Performance, "All That Jazz" from Chicago		4th Runner Up: $1000 National Fundraising Award	Previously Distinguished Young Woman (DYW) of Wyoming 2019, National DYW (formerly Junior Miss) winner of Self-Expression Category. Lifetime National Endowment for the Humanities (NEH) Scholar. National winner both 1st and 2nd place, National History Day (NHD) competition in performance and documentary categories.
2021	Mikkayla T. DeBolt	Sheridan	21	Miss Big Horn Mountains	Original Monologue, "Someday"			
2020	No national pageant was held (Note: Pageant cancelled, state and national pageants postponed to 2021 due to the COVID-19 pandemic)							
2019	Jordan Hardman	Rock Springs	22	Miss Gem City	Clogging, "9 to 5"			
2018	Beck Bridger	Sheridan	22	Miss Northeast Wyoming	Vocal, "At Last"			Crowned Miss Wyoming USA 2023
2017	Cheyenne Buyert	Sheridan	19	Miss Sheridan County	Vocal, "Puttin' on the Ritz"		Women in Business Scholarship Finalist	2nd runner-up at Miss Wyoming USA 2020 pageant
2016	Jordyn Hall	Laramie	23	Miss South Central	Jazz Dance			
2015	Mikaela Shaw	Laramie	21	Miss University of Wyoming	Violin, "Hoe-Down" from Rodeo by Aaron Copland			Contestant at National Sweetheart 2013 pageant Later Miss Wyoming USA 2017
2014	Jessie Allen	Lander	24	Miss Fremont County	Dance, "Feeling Good"			Younger sister of Miss Wyoming USA 2012, Holly Allen 2nd runner-up at Miss Wyoming USA 2013 and 2014 pageants
2013	Rebecca Podio	Newcastle	23	Miss Weston County	Piano, "Fantasy" by William Joseph			Contestant at National Sweetheart 2012 pageant
2012	Lexie Madden	Torrington	21	Miss Goshen County	Original Piano Composition, "Canzone Lenta"	3rd runner-up		Previously Wyoming's Junior Miss 2009
2011	Catherine Lynne Brown	Laramie, Wyoming / Richardson, Texas	24	Miss Albany County	Pop Vocal, "Rolling in the Deep"			Eligible to compete as a student at the University of Wyoming
2010	Alicia Grove	Rock Springs	23	Miss Sweetwater County	Jazz Dance, "Ain't No Sunshine"			
2009	Anna Nicole Nelson	Rock Springs	19	Miss Rock Springs	Jazz Dance, "Summer in the City"			
2008	Courtney Candyce Gifford	Sheridan	19	Miss Sheridan College	Vocal Comedy			Previously Miss Wyoming's Outstanding Teen 2005 First Miss America's Outstanding Teen contestant to win a Miss America state title Later Miss Wyoming USA 2013
2007	Jennifer Lee McCafferty	Scottsbluff, Nebraska	24	Miss Albany County	Vocal, "Gimme, Gimme" from Thoroughly Modern Millie			Eligible to compete as a student at the University of Wyoming
2006	Jenileigh Avriel Sawatzke	Orange County, California	24	Miss Cheyenne	Aerial Silk Routine, "Defying Gravity" from Wicked			Eligible to compete as a student at Laramie County Community College. Later Ms. California 2020
2005	Heather Nicole Jackelen	Jackson	24	Miss Jackson	Acrobatic Dance			Previously Miss Wyoming USA 2001 Later Miss Galaxy 2007
2004	Megan Ann Reichert	Dayton	19	Miss Dayton	Semi-classical Vocal, "Poor Wand'ring One" from The Pirates of Penzance			
2003	Tamara Lynn Kocher	Gillette	22	Miss Gillette	Dance			
2002	Beth Kay Holland	Gillette	23		Vocal, "Orange Colored Sky"			Assumed the title when Rothenbuehler resigned
2002	Katie Rothenbuehler	Gillette	22			Unable to compete; relinquished the title less than 24 hours into her reign in order to accept a full-time teaching position		
2001	Erin Dorean Empey	Casper	20		Ballet, "Cristofori's Dream" by David Lanz			
2000	Kimberly Wilkerson	Gillette	24		Vocal, "Everybody Says Don't" from Anyone Can Whistle			Contestant at National Sweetheart 1999 pageant
1999	Priscilla Elaine Dabney	Lander	20		Ballet, "Somewhere Out There"			
1998	Mindy Jo Baughman	Rock Springs	20		Tap Dance, "Tap Your Troubles Away" from Mack & Mabel			
1997	Jeffie Lorraine Ventling	Laramie	24		Vocal, "The Phantom of the Opera"			
1996	Rebecca Darrington	Gillette	19		Vocal, "100 Easy Ways to Lose a Man" from Wonderful Town		Waterford Crystal Scholarship for Business Management and Marketing	
1995	Dawn Marie Frantz	Casper				Did not compete; originally 1st runner-up, later assumed the title after Lane relinquished her title		
1995	Dana Marie Lane	Cheyenne	20		Classical Piano, Fantaisie-Impromptu			Relinquished the title after competing at the Miss America 1996 pageant
1994	Trisha Ramirez	Cheyenne	23		Piano			
1993	Deborah Rose Maston	Wheatland	21	Miss Northeast	Flute			
1992	Stacy Dawn Cenedese	Cheyenne	21	Miss Laramie County	Dance & Baton Twirling, "Hooked on Instrumentals Part 3"			Later Miss Wyoming USA 1997
1991	Laurie Renee Briggs	Cheyenne	23	Miss Albany County	Jazz Tap Dance			
1990	Carolie DeVonne Howe	Chugwater	22	Miss Cheyenne	Vocal, "My Heart Belongs to Me"			
1989	Alisa Christine Mavrotheris	Cheyenne	25		Acrobatic Jazz Dance			
1988	Wendi Willis	Laramie	19	Miss Albany County	Dance & Baton Twirling			
1987	Terrilynn Marie Hove	Casper	21	Miss Laramie	Vocal Medley			
1986	Lacy Jean Reeves	Laramie	22	Miss Albany County	Vocal, "You're Gonna Hear From Me" from Inside Daisy Clover			
1985	Tamra Jo Dereemer	Horse Creek	22	Miss Cheyenne	Popular Vocal, "God Bless the USA"			
1984	Ann (Annie) Warren Easterbrook	Laramie	21	Miss Albany County	Gymnastics Jazz Dance			
1983	Heather Wallace	Cheyenne	21	Miss Cheyenne	Vocal, "New York, New York"			
1982	Janie Hertzler	Cheyenne	23	Miss Laramie	Vocal, "Everything"			
1981	Keri Lyn Borgaard	Cheyenne	23	Miss Cheyenne	Vocal Medley, "At the Crossroads" & "Hey, Look Me Over"			
1980	Susan Pennington	Casper	20	Miss Casper College	Vocal, "The Man I Love"			
1979	Karla Ann Singer	Cheyenne	19	Miss Laramie County	Vocal, "Mister Melody"			
1978	Kim Pring	Cheyenne	22	Miss Cheyenne	Baton Twirling, "There's No Business Like Show Business"		Non-finalist Talent Award	Previously Miss Wyoming USA 1975 Brought a libel lawsuit against Penthouse Magazine
1977	Jeanne Uphoff	Cheyenne	21	Miss Laramie County	Jazz Dance, "You've Got It Bad, Girl"			
1976	Carol June Wallace	Jackson	24	Miss Yellowstone	Piano Medley, "Love Is a Many-Splendored Thing," "Love Story," "Raindrops Keep Fallin' on My Head," & "Strangers in the Night"		Non-finalist Talent Award	Previously Miss Kentucky USA 1975; Semi-finalist at Miss USA 1975 pageant Mother of Miss Kentucky 2002, Mary Catherine Correll
1975	Trish Long	Laramie	21	Miss University of Wyoming	Classical Vocal, "Un Bel Di" from Madama Butterfly		Non-finalist Talent Award	
1974	Cheryl Johnson	Cheyenne	20	Miss Laramie County Community College	Modern Jazz Dance, "Scorpio"		Dr. David B. Allman Medical Scholarship	Named winner after original titleholder, Vicki Tomisek, resigned
1973	Pamela Jo Hill	Casper	20	Miss Casper College	Vocal, "I Can Love"			
1972	Annette Klipstein	Cheyenne	22	Miss Cheyenne	Classical Vocal, "Adele's Laughing Song" from Die Fledermaus			Previously Wyoming's Junior Miss 1968
1971	Marsha Crandall	Rock Springs	20	Miss Rock Springs	Vocal Medley, "What the World Needs Now Is Love" & "The Look of Love"			
1970	Jane Hutchings	Cheyenne	19	Miss University of Wyoming	Piano, Arabesque" by Claude Debussy			
1969	Sandra Ann Grim	Casper	20	Miss Casper	Vocal Medley, "People," "I Gotta Be Me," & "Free Again"			
1968	Carol Ann Ross	Burns	20	Miss Cheyenne	Clarinet Medley, "Clarinet Concerto" by Mozart, "Strangers on the Shore," & "Ji-da"		Non-finalist Talent Award	
1967	Patricia Ann Martínez	Torrington	18	Miss Torrington	Classical Vocal, "Les Filles de Cadix"			
1966	Susan Lynn Livreri	Douglas	20	Miss Douglas	Comedy Sketch			
1965	Trudy Bower	Freedom	19	Miss University of Wyoming	Vocal, "From This Moment On"			
1964	Joan Alster Selmer	Cheyenne	21	Miss Cheyenne	Acro-Baton Routine			
1963	Cody Marie Neville	Byron		Miss Lovell	Classical Piano, Fantaisie-Impromptu			
1962	Gretchen Lea Stainbrook	Jackson Hole	19	Miss Jackson	Musical Skit			
1961	Mary Ray Orr	Sheridan	19	Miss Sheridan	Dramatic Reading, "The Bride"			
1960	Sharon Irene Luond	Cheyenne	18		Dramatic Monologue from Wingless Victory by Maxwell Anderson			
1959	Linda Lou Phillips	Laramie	19		Vocal & Dance			
1958	No Wyoming representative at Miss America pageant							
1957	No Wyoming representative at Miss America pageant							
1956	No Wyoming representative at Miss America pageant							
1955	No Wyoming representative at Miss America pageant							
1954	No Wyoming representative at Miss America pageant							
1953	Elaine Lois Holkenbrink	Torrington			Fashion Display	Top 10	Preliminary Swimsuit Award	
1952	Ruth A. Francis	Casper			Drama			
1951	Patricia Joan Seabeck	Casper			Monologue			
1950	Lenore Ailene Hoffman	Cheyenne						
1949	Esther McLeod	Sheridan						Esther MacLeod Griffin died at age 93 in Story, Wyoming on October 14, 2020.
1948	Carol Jean Held	Douglas			Piano, Hungarian Opus 9 by Edward MacDowell	1st runner-up		
1947	Dorothy June McKay	Cheyenne			Painting Exhibition	Top 15		Dorothy June McKay Hitchcock died at age 83 on August 22, 2009 at Salemtowne Retirement Community in Winston-Salem, North Carolina.
1946	No Wyoming representative at Miss America pageant							
1945	No Wyoming representative at Miss America pageant							
1944	No Wyoming representative at Miss America pageant							
1943	No Wyoming representative at Miss America pageant							
1942	No Wyoming representative at Miss America pageant							
1941	Patricia Marie Snyder	Cheyenne			Vocal & Dance			
1940	No Wyoming representative at Miss America pageant							
1939	No Wyoming representative at Miss America pageant							
1938	No Wyoming representative at Miss America pageant							
1937	Mary Ann McLaughlin	Riverton						
1936	No Wyoming representative at Miss America pageant							
1935	No Wyoming representative at Miss America pageant							
1934	No national pageant was held							
1933	No Wyoming representative at Miss America pageant							
1932	No national pageants were held							
1931	No national pageants were held							
1930	No national pageants were held							
1929	No national pageants were held							
1928	No national pageants were held							
1927	No Wyoming representative at Miss America pageant							
1926	No Wyoming representative at Miss America pageant							
1925	No Wyoming representative at Miss America pageant							
1924	No Wyoming representative at Miss America pageant							
1923	No Wyoming representative at Miss America pageant							
1922	No Wyoming representative at Miss America pageant							
1921	No Wyoming representative at Miss America pageant							
