= Zach Herbert =

American politician

Member-elect of the Texas House of Representatives from the 112th district
- Assuming office January 2027
- Succeeding: Angie Chen Button

Personal details
- Party: Democratic

Zach Herbert is an American politician. He is the Democratic member-elect of the Texas House of Representatives from the 112th district. Prior to his victory, he was a judge-advocate in the United States Marine Corps and founder of law firm Herbert Law Group.

== Biography ==
Herbert was born and raised in Dallas, before moving to East Texas, where he attended Wills Point High School. He studied at Southern Nazarene University, where he obtained his bachelor's degree in 2006, before obtaining his JD from Pepperdine University School of Law in 2009. After serving in the United States Marine Corps for a few years, he returned to Pepperdine to obtain his MBA from the Business School in 2019.

Herbert worked as a judge-advocate while in the Marines, and was involved with jury trials. He founded a law firm named Herbert Law Group. In 2025, he was certified to practice personal injury trial law by the Texas Board of Legal Specialization.

Herbert ran in the 2026 Texas House of Representatives election in the 112th district. The Republican incumbent Angie Chen Button had represented the district since 2009, narrowly winning re-election in 2018 and 2020. He named education, healthcare, and labor among his top priorities. His race received endorsements from the American Federation of Teachers, Moms Demand Action, Stonewall Democrats of Dallas, Texas AFL-CIO, the Texas State Teachers Association, and VoteVets. and was also targeted by the Democratic Legislative Campaign Committee.

Herbert won the March 2026 Democratic primary unopposed. He won the general election, flipping the district and defeating Button 53.6% to 46.4%.

Hebrert lives in Richardson, where his law firm is based.
