= Miss Wisconsin =

Beauty pageant competition

- Formation: 1927
- Type: Beauty pageant
- Headquarters: New Berlin, Wisconsin
- Members: Miss America
- Official language: English
- Key people: Meghan Coffey DeMore
- Website: Miss Wisconsin official website

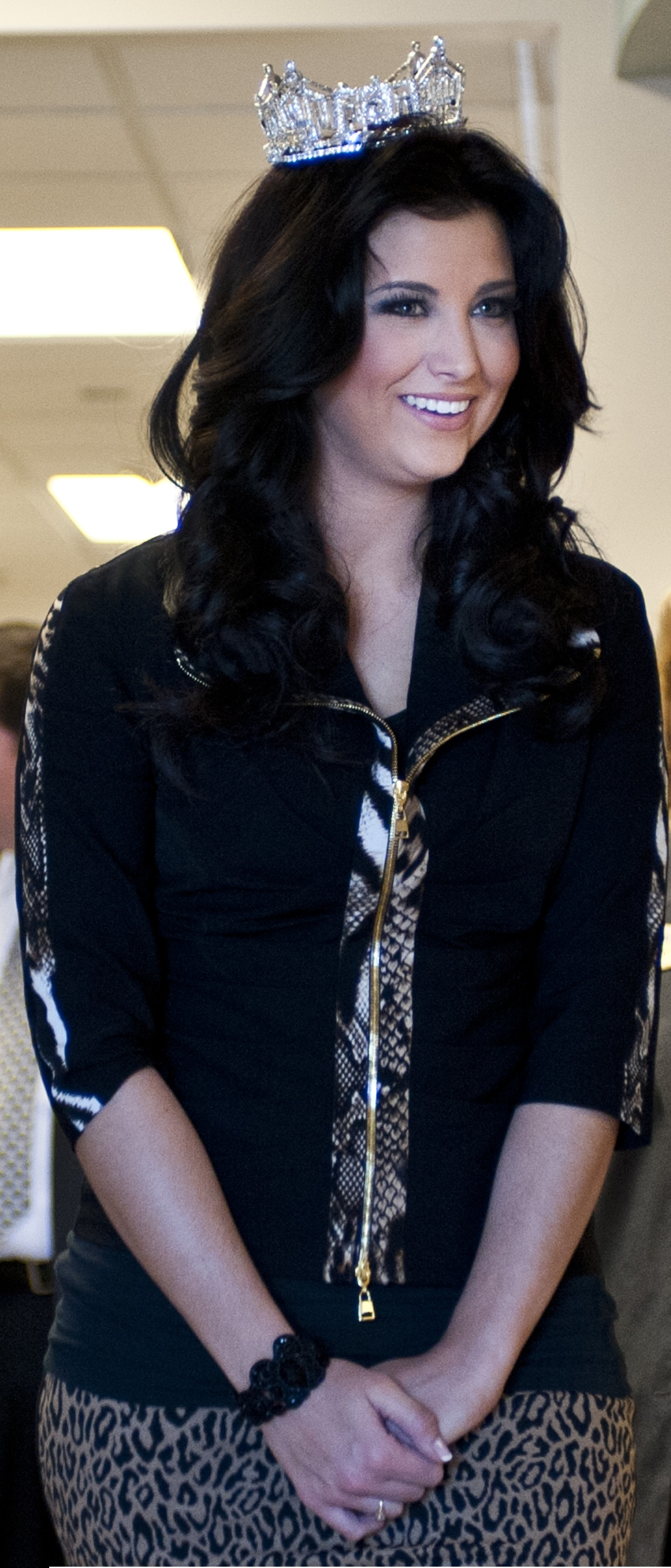
Laura Kaeppeler, Miss Wisconsin 2011 & Miss America 2012

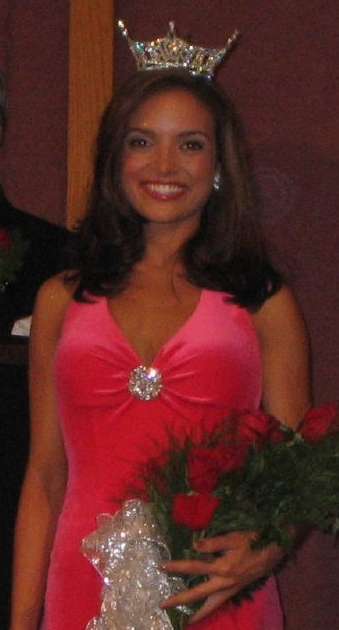
Christina Anna Thompson, Miss Wisconsin 2007

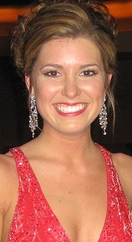
Tracy Ann Gest, Miss Wisconsin 2005

The Miss Wisconsin competition is the pageant, held annually in New Berlin, that selects the representative for the U.S. state of Wisconsin in the annual Miss America pageant.

Wisconsin has won the Miss America title three times: 1973, 2012, and 2023.

On September 17, 2024, the state pageant announced that the Miss Wisconsin pageant (as well as the Miss Wisconsin's Teen competition) will be held in New Berlin, Wisconsin. This will mark the first time that Waukesha County will host the annual state pageants. Miss Wisconsin moved to Oshkosh in 1963 after four years being held in Kenosha.

Jordenne Demiree Butler of Onalaska was crowned Miss Wisconsin on June 20, 2026, at the West Performing Arts Center in New Berlin after besting 30 other statewide candidates.

On Saturday, June 20, 2026, outgoing Miss Wisconsin 2025, Willow Ybre Newell crowned Jordenne Demiree Butler in New Berlin, who competed with the appointed title of Miss River City. She was Miss Wisconsin's Teen 2015 making her the fourth state teen titleholder to advance to the Miss Wisconsin title. The dancer also has the distinction of being the oldest woman, at age 27, to be crowned Miss Wisconsin, and the first to win the state crown with an appointed local title since Jeanne "Jeannie" Eleanor Huston was appointed Miss La Crosse when she was also appointed Miss Wisconsin in 1952, the year when the Wisconsin Junior Chamber of Commerce did not sponsor and organize a Miss Wisconsin contest.

Butler, who likely is the very last woman born in the twentieth century to be named Miss Wisconsin, will now advance to the 2026 Miss America competition to select Miss America 2027 on September 6, 2026 in West Palm Beach, Florida.

Meghan Marie Coffey DeMore (Miss Wisconsin 2006), who became state pageant executive director on February 1, 2026, made history as the first former Miss Wisconsin to become state executive director, after several years as co-executive director and operations manager.

== Results summary ==
The following is a visual summary of the past results of Miss Wisconsin titleholders at the national Miss America pageants/competitions. The year in parentheses indicates the year of the national competition during which a placement and/or award was garnered, not the year attached to the contestant's state title.

=== Placements ===
- Miss Americas: Terry Meeuwsen (1973), Laura Kaeppeler (2012), Grace Stanke (2023)
- 1st runners-up: Mary Alice Fox (1960), Joan Mary Engh (1963), Judith Hieke (1974)
- 2nd runners-up: Barbara Burk Baugh (1968), Tina Marie Sauerhammer (2004)
- 3rd runners-up: N/A
- 4th runners-up: Sharon Mae Singstock (1966)
- Top 8: Christina Anna Thompson (2008)
- Top 10: Keungsuk Kim (1982), Tania Elizabeth Ziegler (1994), Mary-Louise Kurey (2000)
- Top 11: Mandi Jo Genord (2025)
- Top 12: Paula Mae Kuiper (2014)
- Top 15: Clara Ethel Koehler (1924), Bette Anne Miller (1941), Phyllis Ann Kessler (1949), Tianna Marie Vanderhei (2019)
- Top 16: Antoine (Toni) Lunde (1946)
- Top 18: Marie Marguerite Huebner (1933)

=== Awards ===
==== Preliminary awards ====
- Preliminary Lifestyle and Fitness: Mary Alice Fox (1960), Joan Mary Engh (1963), Terry Meeuwsen (1973), Judy Hieke (1974)
- Preliminary Fitness: Mandi Jo Genord (2025)
- Preliminary On Stage Interview: Tianna Marie Vanderhei (2019)
- Preliminary Talent: Terry Meeuwsen (1973), Maria Kim (1988), Mary-Louise Kurey (2000), Tina Marie Sauerhammer (2004), Laura Kaeppeler (2012), Grace Marie Stanke (2023)

==== Non-finalist awards ====
- Non-finalist Interview: Nicole Jean Locy (1998)
- Non-finalist Talent: Lynn Byron Holden (1957), Marilyn Jean Sembell (1976), Gail Marie Soller (1983), Maria Kim (1988), Tricia Ann Luedtke (1991), Stephanie Klett (1993), Joya Josephine Zamora (2001)

==== Other awards ====
- Miss Congeniality: N/A
- Bernie Wayne Performing Arts Award: Mary-Louise Kurey (2000)
- Dr. David B. Allman Medical Scholarship: Carol Ann Schmitt (1975)
- Quality of Life Award Finalists: Laura Margaret Herriot (2002), Molly Jean McGrath (2005)
- Special Education Award: Carol Ann Schmitt (1975)
- Special Scholarship Award: Barbara Jean Bonville (1964)
- STEM Scholarship 2nd runner-up: Jennifer Marie Schmidt (2022)
- AHA Go Red for Women Leadership Award Regional Winner: Mandi Jo Genord (2025)

== Winners ==
- Declared as winner
- Ended as a runner-up
- Ended as a finalist or semi-finalist

Year	Name	Hometown	Age	Local title	Miss America talent	Placement at Miss America	Special scholarships at Miss America	Notes
2026	Jordenne Demiree Butler	Onalaska	27	Miss River City (appointed title)	Jazz Dance, "Thats Life" by Frank Sinatra			Competed for Miss Wisconsin six times, tied a state pageant record with Tianna Marie Vanderhei (2018) Previously Miss Wisconsin's Outstanding Teen 2015
2025	Willow Ybre Newell	Racine	22	Miss Racine	Vocal "I am Telling You" from the musical "Dreamgirls"			First black woman to be named Miss Wisconsin
2024	Mandi Jo Genord	Beaver Dam	22	Miss Northern Lights	Lyrical jazz dance "You Don't Own Me" by Lesley Gore	Top 11	Preliminary Fitness Award AHA Go Red for Women Leadership Award Regional Winner	Previously Miss Wisconsin's Outstanding Teen 2018
2023	Lila Hui Szyryj	Madison	22	Miss South Central	Classical piano, "Revolutionary Etude" by Frederic Chopin			She is the fifth Asian-American, first Chinese-American, and first Madison native to win Miss Wisconsin.
2022	Kylene Elizabeth Spanbauer	Fond du Lac	23	Miss Harbor Cities	Baton, "Holding Out for a Hero"	Did not compete; originally 1st runner-up, later assumed the title after Stanke won Miss America 2023		
2022	Kylene Elizabeth Spanbauer	Fond du Lac	23	Miss Harbor Cities	Baton, "Holding Out for a Hero"			Previously Miss Wisconsin's Outstanding Teen 2016
2022	Grace Stanke	Wausau	20	Miss Badgerland	Classical Violin, "The Storm" by Antonio Vivaldi	Winner	Preliminary Talent Award Winner	Previously Miss Wisconsin's Outstanding Teen 2017; first woman to hold both state titles
2021	Jennifer Marie Schmidt	Racine	25	Miss Rock River Valley	Jazz Dance		STEM Scholarship 2nd runner-up	
2019–20 (Note: Titleholder extended to a full year in 2020 after state and national pageants postponed due to the COVID-19 pandemic)	Alyssa Marie Bohm	Mount Pleasant	24	Miss Rock River Valley	Tap Dance, "Feeling Good"			
2018	Tianna Marie Vanderhei	Wisconsin Rapids	25	Miss Wood Violet	Contemporary Dance, "Lean on Me" by Bill Withers	Top 15	Preliminary On Stage Interview Award	Competed for Miss Wisconsin six times, a state pageant record
2017	McKenna Holly Collins	Waunakee	20	Miss Madison	Ballet en Pointe, “Habanera” from Carmen			Previously a company member at the Madison Ballet Daughter of Wisconsin's Alice in Dairyland 1992, Kristan Ann Conrad
2016	Courtney Jean Pelot	Manitowoc	22	Miss Green Bay Area	Dance, "Burnin' Up" by Jessie J			
2015	Rosalie Elizabeth Smith	Waukesha	19	Miss New Berlin	Lyrical Dance, "Heaven" by Beyoncé			
2014	Raeanna Mary Johnson	Holmen	24	Miss Madison	Lyrical Dance, "Hallelujah"			3rd runner-up at National Sweetheart 2011 pageant First woman to hold the Miss Wisconsin title twice 4th runner-up at Miss Wisconsin USA 2017 pageant
2013	Paula Mae Kuiper	Mount Pleasant	19	Miss Madison	Piano, "Hungarian Rhapsody"	Top 12		
2012	Kathryn (Kate) Bess Gorman	Onalaska	23	Miss La Crosse/Oktoberfest	Vocal, "20th Century Fox Mambo" from Smash			
2011	Raeanna Mary Johnson	Holmen	21	Miss Seven Rivers	Lyrical Dance, "Hallelujah" by Alexandra Burke	Did not compete; originally 1st runner-up, later assumed the title after Kaeppeler won Miss America 2012		
2011	Laura Kaeppeler	Kenosha	23	Miss Southern Wisconsin	Operatic Vocal, "Il Bacio" by Luigi Arditi	Winner	Preliminary Talent Award	Contestant at National Sweetheart 2010 pageant Married TV producer, Mike Fleiss in 2014
2010	Kimberly Brooke Sawyer	Egg Harbor	22	Miss Green Bay Area	Classical Vocal, "Donde lieta uscì" from La bohème			
2009	Kristina Kelly Smaby	Holmen	22	Miss Madison	Ballet en Pointe, "River Deep – Mountain High"			
2008	Briana Rose Lipor	Racine	21	Miss South Central	Classical Vocal, "Chi Il Bel Sogno di Doretta" from La rondine			
2007	Christina Anna Thompson	Pleasant Prairie	23	Miss Madison	Classical Violin, "Praeludium & Allegro" by Fritz Kreisler	Top 8		
2006	Meghan Marie Coffey	New Berlin	22	Miss New Berlin	Baton Twirling, "Stuff Like That There"			Previously Wisconsin's National Teenager 2003
2005	Tracy Ann Gest	Menomonee Falls	20	Miss New Berlin	Classical Piano, "Morceaux de fantaisie"			Previously Beauties of America Teen 2003
2004	Molly Jean McGrath	Wisconsin Rapids	22	Miss Madison	Theatrical Ballet en Pointe, "All That Jazz"		Quality of Life Award Finalist	
2003	Tina Marie Sauerhammer	Green Bay	22	Miss Madison	Classical Cello, "Le cygne"	2nd runner-up	Preliminary Talent Award	
2002	Jayme Michel Dawicki	New Berlin	22	Miss Southern Wisconsin	Classical Piano, "Wedding Day at Troldhaugen"			
2001	Laura Margaret Herriot	Princeton	23	Miss Berlin	Vocal, "Oh, Lady Be Good!"		Quality of Life Award Finalist	
2000	Joya Josephine Zamora	Kenosha	23	Miss Eastern Shore	Vocal, "Life Is Just a Bowl of Cherries"		Non-finalist Talent Award	
1999	Mary-Louise Kurey	Brookfield	24	Miss West Allis	Classical Vocal, "Il Bacio"	Top 10	Bernie Wayne Performing Arts Award Preliminary Talent Award	
1998	Jill Marie Patzner	Arcadia	22	Miss Western Wisconsin	Semi-classical Vocal, "Wishing You Were Somehow Here Again" from The Phantom of the Opera			
1997	Nicole Jean Locy	Glendale	22	Miss Western Wisconsin	Vocal, "Someone Else's Story" from Chess		Non-finalist Interview Award	
1996	Jennifer Marie Streblow	Oshkosh	18	Miss Oshkosh	Vocal, "Someone Like You" from Jekyll & Hyde			
1995	Pamela Lynn Polk	Berlin	22	Miss Southeastern Wisconsin	Vocal, "Operator"			
1994	Laura Jean Voss	Green Bay	22	Miss Green Bay	Semi-classical Vocal, West Side Story Medley			
1993	Tania Elizabeth Ziegler	Fond du Lac	18	Miss Fond du Lac	Classical Violin, "Bruch's Concerto No. 1 in G Minor"	Top 10		
1992	Stephanie Klett	Beloit	25	Miss Wisconsin Central	Coronet Medley, "Basin Street Blues" & "Ciribiribin"		Non-finalist Talent Award	Later Secretary of the Wisconsin Department of Tourism (2011-2019)
1991	Brenda Jo Haines	Arcadia	19	Miss Arcadia	Jazz Clarinet			
1990	Tricia Ann Luedtke	Oostburg	19	Miss Oshkosh	Classical Piano, "Polichinelle in F Sharp Minor"		Non-finalist Talent Award	
1989	Kimberly Jean Totdahl	Racine	23	Miss Kenosha	Vocal & Dance, "Being Alive"			Previously Miss Wisconsin T.E.E.N. 1982 Later Miss Wisconsin USA 1991
1988	Jeanie Marie Pfeiffer	Franksville	25	Miss Milwaukee	Vocal, "Rock-a-Bye Your Baby with a Dixie Melody"			
1987	Maria Kim	Shorewood	20	Miss Madison	Classical Piano, "Fantaisie-Impromptu"		Non-finalist Talent Award Preliminary Talent Award	Previously Miss Wisconsin National Teenager 1983 Previously Miss Wisconsin Teen USA 1985. She is the younger sister of Keungsuk Kim (Miss Wisconsin 1981)
1986	Mara Ann Nesemann	Brookfield	20	Miss Waukesha County	Gymnastics Dance Routine, "1980"			
1985	Mary Kay Anderson	St. Francis	20	Miss St. Francis	Piano, "Frederik Chopin's Etude, Winter Wind, Op 25, No 11"			Later Miss Wisconsin USA 1988
1984	Barbara Marie Mullally	Onalaska	22	Miss La Crosse/Oktoberfest	Vocal, "Here I Am"			Toured with Miss America USO Troupe, 1985
1983	Wendy Lynn Wagner	Menomonie / Des Plaines, Illinois	22	Miss Menomonie	Vocal, "Mira" from Carnival!			
1982	Gail Marie Soller	La Crosse	24	Miss La Crosse/Oktoberfest	Classical Vocal, "Mon cœur s'ouvre à ta voix"		Non-finalist Talent Award	
1981	Keungsuk Kim	Shorewood	19	Miss Milwaukee	Classical Piano, "Kabalevsky's Prelude"	Top 10		She is the older sister of Maria Kim (Miss Wisconsin 1987)
1980	Dana Lorraine Spychalla	Appleton	19	Miss Fond du Lac	Vocal, "The Music and the Mirror" from A Chorus Line			
1979	Kristine Kay Konrad	Oshkosh	19	Miss Oshkosh	Vocal, "Starting Here, Starting Now"			
1978	Carin Ann Kizewic	Racine	24	Miss Milwaukee	Ballet en Pointe, "The Overture" from Die Fledermaus			
1977	Jennifer Mae Woychik	Arcadia	19	Miss Arcadia	Vocal Comedy, "I Love Trash"			
1976	Julie Ann Nowak	Greendale	19	Miss West Allis	Popular Vocal, "Do You Know Where You're Going To?"			
1975	Marilyn Jean Sembell	Beloit / St. Louis, Missouri	25	Miss Lake Geneva	Classical Piano, "Prelude in G minor"		Non-finalist Talent Award	
1974	Carol Ann Schmitt	Green Bay	22	Miss Milwaukee	Vocal, "Speak Softly Love"		Dr. David B. Allman Medical Scholarship Special Education Award	
1973	Judith Hieke	Menomonee Falls	19	Miss Milwaukee	Flute Medley including "Cuanto le Gusta"	1st runner-up	Preliminary Swimsuit Award	
1972	Linda Marie Henderson	Elm Grove	20	Miss Milwaukee-Summerfest	Ballet	Did not compete; originally 1st runner-up, later assumed the title after Meeuwsen won Miss America 1973		
1972	Terry Meeuwsen	De Pere	23	Miss Appleton	Vocal, "He Touched Me" from Drat! The Cat!	Winner	Preliminary Swimsuit Award Preliminary Talent Award	
1971	Patricia Ann Jacobs	Wauwatosa	19	Miss Stevens Point	Vocal & Dance, "On a Clear Day You Can See Forever"			Toured with Miss America USO Troupe
1970	Linda Jane Johnson	Milwaukee	19	Miss Madison	Piano, "Polonaise"			
1969	Cynthia Ann Morgan	Janesville	18	Miss Janesville	Vocal, "Old Devil Moon"			
1968	Marilyn Kay Brahmsteadt	Wisconsin Rapids	21	Miss La Crosse	Vocal, "What a Diff'rence a Day Made"			
1967	Barbara Burk Baugh	Brookfield	20	Miss Milwaukee	Vocal, "Mira" from Carnival!	2nd runner-up		Barbara Burk Baugh Waters died at age 55 on October 26, 2002, at home in Brookfield, Wis. after a long battle with cancer.
1966	Candace Gail Hinz	Milwaukee	19	Miss West Allis	Piano & Watercolor Painting, "Tara's Theme" from Gone with the Wind			
1965	Sharon Mae Singstock	Oshkosh	20	Miss Oshkosh	Vocal, "Rock-a-Bye Your Baby With a Dixie Melody"	4th runner-up		
1964	Angela Gina Baldi	Glendale	18	Miss North Shore	Piano, "On Wisconsin in Three Variations"			
1963	Barbara Jean Bonville	Whitefish Bay	19	Miss North Shore	Cello, "Pièce en forme de Habanera" by Maurice Ravel		Special Scholarship Award	
1962	Joan Mary Engh	La Crosse	21	Miss La Crosse	Vocal Comedy, "I'll Be Anything You Want Me to Be"	1st runner-up	Preliminary Swimsuit Award	Served as Wisconsin's Alice in Dairyland in 1960.
1961	Diane Margaret Anderson	Eau Claire	19	Miss Eau Claire	Violin & Ballet en Pointe, "The Swan"			
1960	Karen Marie Fahrenbach	Racine	21	Miss Racine	Classical Ballet en Pointe, "The Sleeping Beauty"			Karen Marie Fahrenbach Thompson died of cancer at age 68 on November 6, 2007, in Racine, Wisconsin.
1959	Mary Alice Fox	Sheboygan	20	Miss Sheboygan	Soft Shoe Comedy Dance	1st runner-up	Preliminary Swimsuit Award	
1958	Kay Joan Ross	West Allis	24	Miss West Allis	Art Presentation with Vocal & Dance			
1957	Joan Carol Hentschel	Wauwatosa	18	Miss Wauwatosa	Interpretive Ballet, "3:00 in the Morning"			
1956	Lynn Byron Holden	Milwaukee	19	Miss Ripon	Piano		Non-finalist Talent Award	Lynn Holden Noakes died at age 79 on April 8, 2016 in Florida
1955	Margaret Carolynne Walls	Milwaukee	18	Miss Milwaukee	Ballet, "Dying Swan"			Margaret Walls Carseth died at age 88 on November 8, 2025 in San Antonio, Texas.
1954	Dixie Ann Sarchet	Stevens Point	19	Miss Wisconsin Rapids	Modern Dance, "Slaughter on Tenth Avenue"			Dixie Ann Sarchet Kuenn married Detroit Tigers baseball player and future Milwaukee Brewers coach and manager Harvey Edward Kuenn on October 29, 1955, in Stevens Point, Wisconsin. She died at 69 on March 12, 2004, in Milwaukee, Wisconsin.
1953	Judith Lee Jacobsen	Wauwatosa	19	Miss Milwaukee	Vocal & Dance, "Make Believe" & "Come Back to Sorrento"			
1952	Jeanne "Jeannie" Eleanor Huston	La Crosse	19	Miss La Crosse	Cello			
1951	Sheila Marie Murphy	Marshfield	18	Miss Marshfield	Monologue			
1950	Gloria Betty Lange	Milwaukee	20	Miss Milwaukee	Operatic Vocal, "The Donkey Serenade" from The Firefly			
1949	Phyllis Ann Kessler	Green Bay	18	Miss Green Bay	Baton Twirling	Top 15		Phyllis Ann Kessler Lynn Sacho died at age 90 on March 7, 20, 2022 in De Pere, Wisconsin.
1948	Marvene Margaret Fischer	Milwaukee	19	Miss Milwaukee				Marvene Margaret Fischer died at age 99 on November 10, 2026 in Sanborn, Iowa. At the time of her death she was the oldest and earliest living Miss Wisconsin titleholder.
1947	Gladys Elaine Berkley	Baraboo	19	Miss Baraboo	Monologue			Gladys Elaine Berkley Stracy died of a brief illness in Madison, Wisconsin at age 38 on September 10, 1965. She remains as the only Miss Wisconsin from Sauk County.
1946	Antoine (Toni) Bernice Lunde	Milwaukee / Westby	20	Miss Milwaukee		Top 16		Antonie Lunde Early died at age 78 on March 9, 2006, at home in Greenwood, South Carolina.
1945	Eileen Christianson (Christy)	Menomonie	20	Miss Menomonie				
1944	Elsie (Elyse) Sutter	Milwaukee	20	Miss Milwaukee		N/A		Did not compete in the Miss America 1944 pageant. She died at age 95 on September 16, 2019 in Florida.
1943	No Wisconsin representative at Miss America pageant							
1942	Charlotte Ruth Lemmer	Milwaukee	18	Miss Milwaukee				
1941	Bette Anne Miller	Milwaukee	18	Miss Milwaukee Mid-Summer Festival	Artistic Caricature of President Franklin D. Roosevelt	Top 15		Bette Anne Miller Schapekahm died at age 87 on June 2, 2009 in Wauwatosa, Wisconsin.
1940	No Wisconsin representative at Miss America pageant							
1939	No Wisconsin representative at Miss America pageant							
1938	No Wisconsin representative at Miss America pageant							
1937	No Wisconsin representative at Miss America pageant							
1936	Aline Fern Schwartz	Milwaukee	18	Miss Milwaukee				
1935	No Wisconsin representative at Miss America pageant							
1934	No pageant was held							
1933	Marie Marguerite Huebner	Portage	20	Miss Portage		Top 18		Marie Huebner Raimer died at age 93 on February 15, 2007 after a brief illness in Puyallup, Washington.
1932	No pageants were held							
1931	No pageants were held							
1930	No pageants were held							
1929	No pageants were held							
1928	No pageants were held							
1927	Marjorie Mae Leffingwell	Madison / Rio, Wisconsin		Miss Madison			Marjorie Mae Leffingwell Grate died at age 83 on December 23, 1992 in Madison, Wisconsin.	Multiple Wisconsin representatives Contestants competed under local title at Miss America pageant. Virginia June Hillyer competed as Miss Wisconsin
1927	Virginia June Hillyer	Fort Atkinson	17	Miss Fort Atkinson			Virginia June Hillyer Kincaid was the first-ever crowned Miss Wisconsin and later died at age 77 of heart complications on November 25, 1986 in Panama City, Florida.	Multiple Wisconsin representatives Contestants competed under local title at Miss America pageant. Virginia June Hillyer competed as Miss Wisconsin
1926	Dorothy Bernadine Seiler	Madison		Miss Madison			Dorothy Bernadine Seiler Bowley died at age 90 on April 3, 1996, in Augusta, Wisconsin.	Multiple Wisconsin representatives Contestants competed under local title at Miss America pageant
1926	Florence Andrees	Milwaukee		Miss Milwaukee				Multiple Wisconsin representatives Contestants competed under local title at Miss America pageant
1926	Name not known			Miss Racine				Multiple Wisconsin representatives Contestants competed under local title at Miss America pageant
1925	Virginia Sara Armstrong	Milwaukee		Miss Milwaukee			Was later named Miss South Bend (Indiana) 1927. Virginia "Ginny" Sara Armstrong Mahn died in Mount Dora, Florida, on July 16, 2009, at age 99.	No Miss Wisconsin Competed under local title at Miss America pageant
1924	Clara Ethel Koehler	Milwaukee	26	Miss Milwaukee		Top 15	Clara Ethel Koehler Lord died in Milwaukee at age 86 on June 30, 1984. She was the only contestant from Wisconsin to compete at Miss America who was born in the 19th century (June 1898).	No Miss Wisconsin Competed under local title at Miss America pageant
1923	No Wisconsin representative at Miss America pageant							
1922	No Wisconsin representative at Miss America pageant							
1921	No Wisconsin representative at Miss America pageant							
