= Miss America 1973 =

- Date: September 9, 1972
- Presenters: Bert Parks
- Venue: Boardwalk Hall, Atlantic City, New Jersey
- Broadcaster: NBC
- Winner: Terry Meeuwsen; Wisconsin

Miss America 1973, the 46th Miss America pageant, was held at the Boardwalk Hall in Atlantic City, New Jersey, on September 9, 1972 and broadcast on NBC.

The winner was Terry Meeuwsen, the first woman representing Wisconsin to take the crown. She would later become co-host of television's The 700 Club.

Among the finalists was Cindy Lee Sikes, entered as Miss Kansas, who became the actress Cynthia Sikes and co-star for three seasons in the 1980s on the NBC drama St. Elsewhere.

== Results ==
=== Placements ===
Placement	Contestant
Miss America 1973	Wisconsin – Terry Meeuwsen
1st Runner-Up	North Carolina – Constance Anne Dorn
2nd Runner-Up	Pennsylvania – Linda Kay Olsen
3rd Runner-Up	Texas – Mae Beth Cormany
4th Runner-Up	Indiana – Rebecca Sue Graham
Top 10	Delaware – Catherine Lawton; Iowa – Renee Stuedemann; Kansas – Cindy Lee Sikes; Louisiana – Debby Robert; Maryland – Kathleen Neff

=== Awards ===
==== Preliminary awards ====
Awards	Contestant
Lifestyle and Fitness	Indiana – Rebecca Sue Graham; Kansas – Cindy Lee Sikes; Wisconsin – Terry Meeuwsen
Talent	Delaware – Catherine Lawton; Louisiana – Debby Robert; Wisconsin – Terry Meeuwsen

==== Other awards ====
Awards	Contestant
Non-finalist Talent	Arizona – Linda Gail Sirrine; Maine – Marilyn E. Lash; Massachusetts – Marie June Semas; Michigan – Terri Ann Cousino; Nevada – Helen Marie Bennett; New Jersey – Linda Carol Gialanella; Ohio – Karen Sue Sparka; Oregon – Sandra Lynn Herring; Utah – Sally Peterson
Miss Congeniality	Utah – Sally Peterson

== Contestants ==
State	Name	Hometown	Age	Talent	Placement	Awards	Notes
Alabama	Freita Fuller	Opelika	19	Hula & Tahitian Dance			
Alaska	Linda Hogue	Kodiak	18	Modern Dance, "Charlie Chaplin Pantomime"		Neat as a Pin Award	
Arizona	Linda Gail Sirrine	Mesa	19	Popular Vocal, "Happy Heart"		Non-finalist Talent Award	
Arkansas	Debbye Hazelwood	Magnolia	20	Piano, Warsaw Concerto			
California	Diane Wagner	Daly City	20	Ballet, "Swan Lake"			
Colorado	Sally Anderson	Longmont	19	Classical Vocal, "Daydreams"			
Connecticut	Linda Kapral	East Lyme	19	Modern Jazz, African Dance, & Gymnastics			
Delaware	Catherine Lawton	Clayton	20	Banjo, "Banjo Memories"	Top 10	Preliminary Talent Award	
Florida	Suzanne Charles	Fort Lauderdale	20	Ballet, "Dance of the Painted Doll"			
(Georgia (U.S. state)) Georgia	Lisa Lawalin	Rome	20	Vocal, "I Could Have Danced All Night" from My Fair Lady			
Hawaii	Marlene Diane Kehaulani Kalahiki	Kailua-Kona	22	Modern Jazz Dance, "Shotgun"			
Idaho	Vicki Hawkins	Boise	20	Piano, Theme from Summer of '42			
Illinois	Carolyn Paulus	Elmhurst	20	Classical Vocal, "Glitter and be Gay" from Candide			
Indiana	Rebecca Graham	Indianapolis	23	Gymnastics Dance	4th runner-up	Preliminary Lifestyle & Fitness Award	
Iowa	Renee Stuedemann	Clinton	23	Baton Twirling, "Can-Can" from Orpheus in the Underworld	Top 10		
Kansas	Cynthia Sikes	Coffeyville	18	Vocal, "Fame"	Top 10	Preliminary Lifestyle & Fitness Award	Starred as Dr. Annie Cavanero on St. Elsewhere from 1982 to 1985
Kentucky	Carolyn Walters	Louisville	19	Vocal, "Rock-a-Bye Your Baby with a Dixie Melody"			
Louisiana	Debby Robert	Baton Rouge	21	Classical Vocal, "The Art of Beguiling"	Top 10	Preliminary Talent Award	
Maine	Marilyn Lash	Friendship	19	Semi-classical Vocal, "Poor Wand'ring One" from The Pirates of Penzance		Non-finalist Talent Award	
Maryland	Kathleen Louise Neff	Cumberland	21	Dramatic Soliloquy, "Shall I Tell You What I Think of You" from The King and I	Top 10		
Massachusetts	Marie Semas	Taunton	18	Piano & Vocal of an Original Composition		Non-finalist Talent Award	
Michigan	Terri Cousino	Erie	19	Vocal, "How Can I Wait?"		Non-finalist Talent Award	
Minnesota	Linda Hagen	Hampton	22	Popular Vocal, "Who Will Buy?" from Oliver!			
Mississippi	Glenda Meadows	Richton	23	Vocal Medley, "Am I Blue?" & "I'd Rather Be Blue"			
Missouri	Anita Columbo	St. Louis	21	Vocal/Dance, "It's Today" from Mame			
Montana	Debra DeBiase	Billings	21	Ballet, "Summer of '42"			
Nebraska	Jeanine Giller	Omaha	22	Jazz Dance, "Bitter End"			
Nevada	Helen Bennett	Reno	23	Classical Ballet, "Dance of the Gypsy"		Non-finalist Talent Award	
New Hampshire	Jane Badler	Manchester	18	Popular Vocal, "Can't Take My Eyes Off You"			Starred on NBC's V series from 1983 to 1985 & on ABC's V series in 2011
New Jersey	Linda Gialanella	Maplewood	22	Sketching Presentation, "Teaching the World to Draw"		Non-finalist Talent Award	
New Mexico	Wren Prather	Carlsbad	19	Upside Down Tap Dance, "Yankee Doodle Dandy"			
(New York (state)) New York	Judith Keithley	Rochester	19	Piano, Rhapsody in Blue			
North Carolina	Constance Dorn	Kinston	19	Ballet, "The Grand Holiday"	1st runner-up		Later Miss North Carolina USA 1975 2nd runner-up at Miss USA 1975
North Dakota	Georgia Ann Becker	Napoleon	18	Country Western Vocal, "Rose Garden"		Non-finalist Talent Award	
Ohio	Karen Sparka	Bowling Green	21	Vocal Medley, "My Man" & "My Man's Gone Now"		Non-finalist Talent Award	
Oklahoma	Debbie Giannopoulos	Oklahoma City	20	Classical Vocal from Carmen			Contestant at Miss Teenage America 1968
Oregon	Sandra Lynn Herring	Portland	20	Vocal Medley, "Who Will Buy?" & "As Long as He Needs Me" from Oliver!		Non-finalist Talent Award and USO	Contestant at Miss Teenage America 1969
Pennsylvania	Linda Olson	Corry	20	Piano, "Gershwin Medley"	2nd runner-up		
Rhode Island	Michele Passarelli	Pawtucket	18	Vocal, "Cabaret"			
South Carolina	Bonnie Corder	Columbia	21	Vocal Medley, "My Man's Gone Now", "Let Me Sing", & "I'm Happy"			
South Dakota	Janet Hunter	Madison	20	Classical Piano, "Scherzo No. 3" by Chopin			
Tennessee	Debbie Cathey	Nashville	20	Semi-classical Vocal, "Amazing Grace"			
Texas	Mae Beth Cormany	Wichita Falls		Vocal Medley, "Misty" & "Come Rain or Come Shine"	3rd runner-up		
Utah	Sally Peterson	Salt Lake City	21	Classical Piano, "Piano Concerto No. 1"		Miss Congeniality Non-finalist Talent Award	
Vermont	Kathy Hebert	Burlington	21	Vocal & Guitar with Display of Fashion Design, "I Don't Know How to Love Him"			
Virginia	Dona Marie Pillow	Lynchburg	22	Vocal, "Memories"			Cousin of country singer Ray Pillow
(Washington (state)) Washington	Rebecca Pozzi	Kent	20	Vocal Medley, "Consider Yourself" & "I'd Do Anything"			
West Virginia	Lynette Koper	Weirton	21	Presentation of Original Art Works			
Wisconsin	Terry Meeuwsen	De Pere	23	Vocal, "He Touched Me" from Drat! The Cat!	Winner	Preliminary Lifestyle & Fitness Award Preliminary Talent Award	Co-host of The 700 Club
Wyoming	Annette Klipstein	Cheyenne	22	Classical Vocal, "Adele's Laughing Song" from Die Fledermaus			Previously Wyoming's Junior Miss 1968
