= Hazel Homer-Wambeam =

American beauty queen

- Born: Laramie, Wyoming, U.S.
- Education: University of Wyoming
- Occupation: brand manager
- Beauty pageant titleholder
- Title: Miss Wyoming 2022
- Major competitions: Miss Wyoming 2022 (Winner); Miss America 2023

Hazel Homer-Wambeam is an American brand manager and former beauty pageant titleholder. She became the first Jewish woman to win Miss Wyoming when she was crowned in 2022.

== Early life and education ==
Homer-Wambeam is Jewish and from Laramie, Wyoming. Growing up, her family worshipped in a local Masonic Temple since there is no synagogue in the city. Her mother is Jewish and her father is not. Homer-Wambeam attended Hebrew school and celebrated Jewish holidays growing up, but did not observe Shabbat and did not have a Bat Mitzvah.

In 2015, she produced a 10-minute documentary film about Stan Lee and the creation of the Marvel Universe, which won first place at Wyoming's state competition for National History Day. She went on to compete in the national competition in Washington, D.C.

She studied theatre and dance performance at the University of Wyoming, where she served as the student president of the university's chapter of Hillel International. She curated the university's exhibition on Stan Lee at the American Heritage Center.

== Career ==
She worked as a brand manager for Kartoon Studios' Stan Lee Universe in Los Angeles. She oversees Stan Lee Universe's social media platforms and has collaborated with celebrities including Ryan Reynolds and Samuel L. Jackson.

=== Pageants ===
Homer-Wambeam won the Miss University of Wyoming pageant and won Distinguished Young Woman for Wyoming in 2019.

She was crowned Miss Wyoming on June 25, 2022. She was the first Jewish woman to ever win the Miss Wyoming title in the pageant's 101-year history. Homer-Wambeam competed as a delegate in the Miss America 2022 pageant. Her platform, called “EveryBODY Dance, Body Positivity through Movement", was a body positivity through dance education initiative. Trained as a singer and dancer, she performed a musical number from Chicago for the talent portion of the competition. She placed fourth in the fundraising category, collecting $2,800 in six months to go towards scholarships for future contestants. Homer-Wambeam received $8,500 in scholarships from Miss Wyoming, Miss America, and the University of Wyoming to go towards her own education.

== Personal life ==
Homer-Wambeam identities as a feminist.

Awards and achievements
Preceded by Mikkayla T. DeBolt	Miss Wyoming; 2022	Succeeded by Mackenzie Kern
