= Miss America 2023 =

95th edition of the Miss America competition

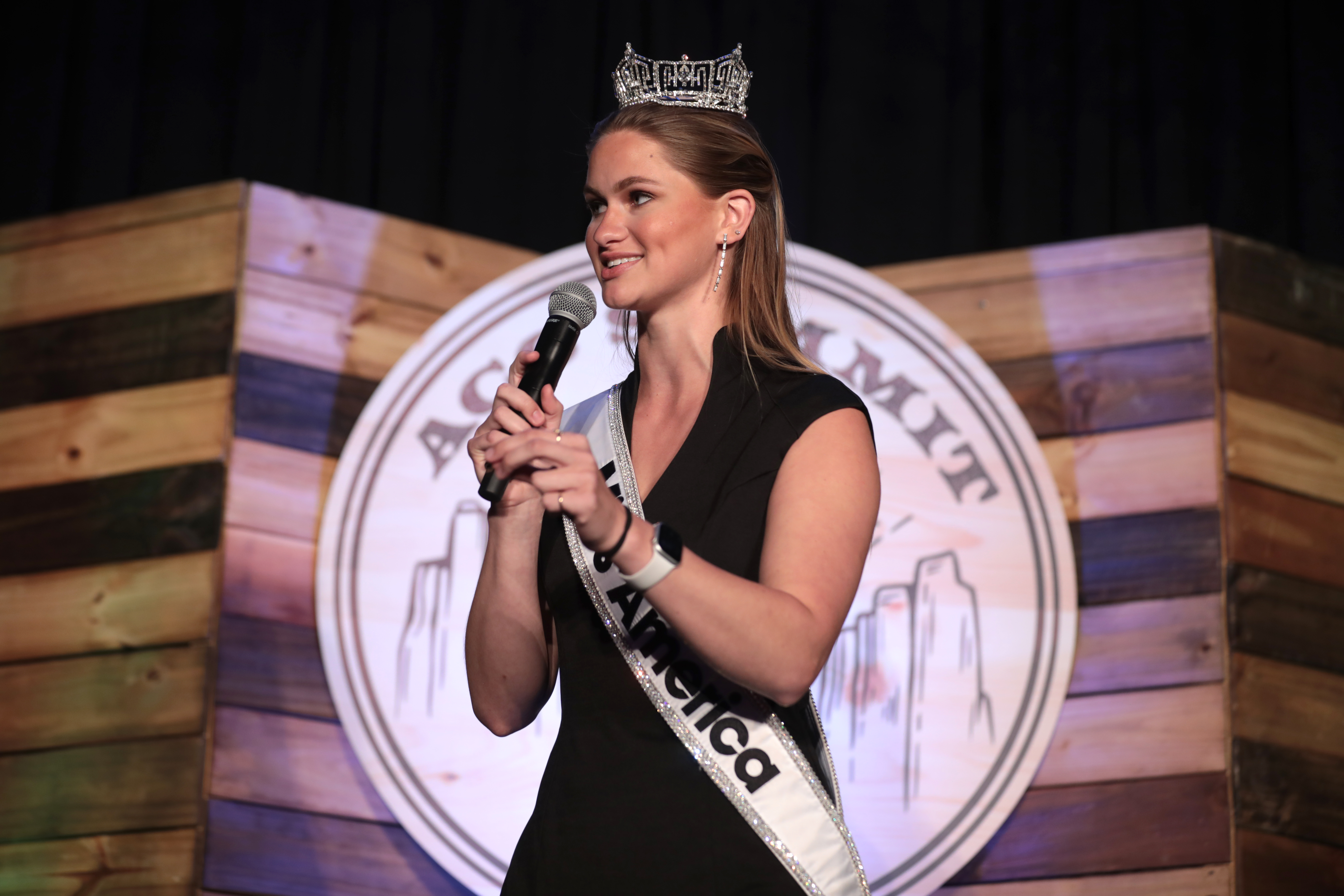
- 2023 Miss America Grace Stanke speaking with attendees at the American Conservation Coalition's 2023 Summit.
- Date: December 15, 2022
- Presenters: Laura Rutledge
- Venue: Mohegan Sun, Uncasville, Connecticut
- Broadcaster: Pageants Live
- Entrants: 51
- Placements: 11
- Returns: Maine
- Winner: Grace Stanke; Wisconsin
- Congeniality: Hannah Edelen (Kentucky)

Miss America 2023 was the 95th edition of the Miss America pageant, which occurred at the Mohegan Sun on December 15, 2022.

Instead of airing on television, the pageant was streamed for the second consecutive year. Unlike the 2022 edition, which streamed on the mainstream service Peacock, the 2023 edition was available only through Pageants Live, a pageant-specific streaming service featuring a subscription price of $32.99 per month at the time with no lower-cost or event-only option available.

Emma Broyles of Alaska crowned Grace Stanke of Wisconsin as Miss America 2023 at the end of the event. Stanke became the third woman from Wisconsin won the title. Coincidentally, both Stanke and Broyles had previously competed together in Miss America's Outstanding Teen 2018.

== Background ==
Miss America 2023 was the 95th installment of the pageant, but the 101st Miss America anniversary. Contestants were required to be between ages 18 and 26 (born between January 1, 1996, and December 31, 2003), be a United States resident or citizen, and meet the particular residency requirements of the states, municipalities, and districts they represent. Candidates must also have been in proper, good or excellent health, including being fully vaccinated from COVID-19.

U.S. state contests occurred during spring and summer 2022.

== Results ==
=== Placements ===
Placement	Contestant
Miss America 2023	Grace Stanke (Wisconsin)
1st Runner-Up	Taryn Delanie Smith (New York)
2nd Runner-Up	Averie Bishop (Texas)
3rd Runner-Up	Elizabeth Lynch (West Virginia)
4th Runner-Up	Kelsey Hollis (Georgia)
Top 7	Elizabeth Hallal (Indiana); Heather Renner (Nevada)
Top 11	Lauren Teruya (Hawaii); Monica Nia Jones (Illinois)§; Elizabetta Nies (Ohio); Sophia Takla (Oregon)

§ – Voted into the Top 11 by receiving the America's Choice Award (Note: The America's Choice winner may be a Top 10 scorer; if that is the case, the 11th highest scorer joins the Top 11.)

== Other awards ==
Awards	Candidates
America's Choice (guarantees top 11 placement)	Illinois – Monica Nia Jones
Equity and Justice Scholarship	Nevada – Heather Renner (Winner); Texas – Averie Bishop (Finalist); Florida – Lindsay Bettis (Finalist)
Jean Bartel Military Awareness Scholarship	Maryland – Kayla Willing
Miss Congeniality	Kentucky – Hannah Edelen
Non-Finalist Talent	California – Catherine Liang; Louisiana – Gracie Reichman; Nebraska – Steffany Lien; Utah – Lindsey Larsen
Non-Finalist Social Impact Pitch	Florida – Lindsay Bettis
Social Impact Scholarship	Mississippi – Emmie Perkins (Winner) -- Music is Medicine; Alabama – Lindsay Fincher (1st Runner-up) -- Catalyst: Arts for All; Kentucky – Hannah Edelen (2nd Runner-up) -- Read, Ready, Kentucky
STEM Scholarship	Virginia – Victoria Chuah (Winner); Alaska – Jessica Reisinger (1st Runner-up); South Dakota – Hunter Widvey (2nd Runner-up)
Women in Business Scholarship	Texas – Averie Bishop (Winner); Florida – Lindsay Bettis (1st Runner-up); California – Catherine Liang (2nd Runner-up)
Women Who Brand Scholarship	Texas – Averie Bishop (Winner); Vermont – Alexina Federhen (Finalist); Arizona – Melody Pierce (Finalist)

== Contestants ==
A total of 51 titleholders competed.

- Winner
- Runner-up
- Finalist
- Non-Finalist Award Winner

State or district	Name	Age (Note: Ages at the time of national competition)	Hometown	Talent	"Social Impact Initiative"	Placement	Special awards	Notes
Alabama	Lindsay Fincher	22	Wedowee	Dance, "Bossa Nova Baby" by Elvis Presley, from Fun in Acapulco	"Catalyst: Arts For All"		Social Impact Finalist	
Alaska	Jessica Reisinger	23	Anchorage	Acrobatic Dance, "I Was Here" by Beyonce	"Supporting Survivors: Increasing Access to Sexual Assault Response Resources"		Women in STEM Finalist	
Arizona	Melody Pierce	26	Phoenix	Tap Dance	"S.T.E.P.S. Towards Eating Disorder Recovery and Awareness"		Women Who Brand Finalist	
Arkansas	Ebony Mitchell	25	Harrison	Tap Dance	"A Responsible Digital You"			
California	Catherine Liang	22	California	Piano	"To Be a Champion of Courage"		Non-Finalist Talent Women in Business Finalist	
Colorado	Savannah Cavanaugh	25	Beaver Creek	Vocal	"Healthy Lungs, Healthy Life"			
Connecticut	Sylvana González	24	Farmington	Latin Jazz Dance, "Get on Your Feet" by Gloria Estefan	"With Heart, Redressing the Run of Abuse"			
Delaware	Grace Otley	22	Hockessin	Violin/Vocal/Keyboard	"Teaching Others to Love Themselves Through Music"			Previously Miss Delaware's Outstanding Teen 2014
District of Columbia	Alivia Roberts	26	Shannon, MS	Ballet en Pointe, "Thunderstruck" by AC/DC	"The D.R.E.A.M. Impact"			
Florida	Lindsay Bettis	26	Ponte Vedra Beach	Jazz Dance	"Prescription for Change: Prevention-Treatment-Recovery"		Equity and Justice Finalist Non-Finalist Social Impact Pitch Women in Business Finalist	
Georgia	Kelsey Hollis	22	Warner Robins	Vocal, "I Didn't Know My Own Strength" by Whitney Houston	"Autism Acceptance: A Platform for Change"	Fourth Runner-up	Preliminary Social Impact Pitch	Previously Miss Georgia's Outstanding Teen 2016
Hawaii	Lauren Teruya	23	Honolulu	Musical Theatre	"Arts for All"	Top 11		Previously Miss Hawaii Teen USA 2017 Sister of Kathryn Teruya, Miss Hawaii Teen USA 2012 and Miss Hawaii 2017
Idaho	Sarah Jensen	26	Weiser	Piano	"Why Math Matters"			
Illinois	Monica Nia Jones	26	Chicago	Violin	"Music Uniting Souls in Communities"	Top 11	People's Choice	
Indiana	Elizabeth Hallal	21	Georgetown	Vocal	"The Triple A Project: Accessibility to the Arts for All"	Top 7	Preliminary Talent Award	
Iowa	Bailey Hodson	24	Berwick	Vocal	"The ABCs: Anti Bullying Campaign"		Preliminary Social Impact Pitch	
Kansas	Ayanna Hensley	21	Dodge City	Dance	"Aces Low: Overcoming Adverse Childhood Experiences"			
Kentucky	Hannah Edelen	24	Springfield	Clogging	"Read Ready Kentucky"		Miss Congeniality Social Impact Finalist	
Louisiana	Gracie Reichman	21	Colfax	Contemporary Clogging	"Think Twice, Be Nice"		Non-Finalist Talent	Previously Miss Louisiana's Outstanding Teen 2018
Maine	Madison Leslie	22	Lewiston	Vocal	"Time to Shake Your Beauty"			Previously Miss Maine's Outstanding Teen 2016
Maryland	Kayla Willing	19	Deal Island	Vocal	"The Write Reason"		Jean Bartel Military Awareness Scholarship	
Massachusetts	Katrina Kincade	25	Boston	Vocal	"Special Olympics: Inclusion Revolution"			First Muslim woman to win Miss Massachusetts
Michigan	Melissa Beyrand	22	Milford	Violin	"Women in Science, Technology, Engineering, the Arts & Mathematics (STEAM)"			
Minnesota	Rachel Evangelisto	24	Minnesota	Praying Mantis Kung Fu	"Foster Care in Crisis: Native Youth in Minnesota"			First Native American to win Miss Minnesota
Mississippi	Emmie Perkins	21	Hattiesburg	Vocal	"Music is Medicine"		Social Impact Winner	
Missouri	Clare Marie Kuebler	21	Wildwood	Dance	"Celebrating Courage: Childhood Cancer Advocacy"			
Montana	Alexa Baisch	22	Glendive	Dance	"The New Stranger Danger: Safety Through Education"			Previously Miss Montana's Outstanding Teen 2017
Nebraska	Steffany Lien	24	Lincoln	Dance Twirl	"Developing Resilience Over Adversity"		Non-Finalist Talent	Previously Miss Nebraska's Outstanding Teen 2015
Nevada	Heather Renner	23	Reno	Classical Vocal	"Performing for a Purpose"	Top 7	Equity and Justice Winner	Previously Miss Nevada's Outstanding Teen 2016 First openly gay Miss Nevada
New Hampshire	Sarah White	23	Weirs Beach	Tap Dance	"Mind Your Mental Health"			
New Jersey	Augostina Mallous	20	Cape May Court House	Acrobatic Dance	"Stop the Traffic: Human Trafficking Prevention"			Previously Miss New Jersey's Outstanding Teen 2017
New Mexico	Kaitlin Kerl	25	Albuquerque	Dance	"Building Bridges Through Inclusion"			
New York	Taryn Delanie Smith	25	Manhattan	Vocal	"S.O.S. Supporting Our Shelters"	First Runner-up		
North Carolina	Karolyn Martin	22	Charlotte	Vocal	"#SelfKare: Eat to Success"			
North Dakota	Sidni Kast	24	Minot	Piano/Vocal	"The One Body Movement"			
Ohio	Elizabetta Nies	19	Cincinnati	Piano	"Living from the Inside Out: A Proven, Global Method of Making Aspirations Attainable"	Top 11		Daughter of Kathleen Farrell Nies, Miss Illinois 1992 and Miss Illinois USA 1994 Niece of Mary-Ann Farrell, Miss New York 1984 and Monica Farrell, Miss Florida 1985 and Miss Florida USA 1988
Oklahoma	Megan Gold	22	Edmond	Flute	"America, Let's do Lunch-Ending Senior Hunger"			
Oregon	Sophia Takla	21	Portland	Vocal	"Operation Joy: Bringing Happiness to Pediatric Care Patients"	Top 11		Daughter of Kimberly Stubblefield Takla, Miss Oregon USA 1986
Pennsylvania	Alysa Bainbridge	24	Reading	Lyrical Dance	"Tyler's Triumph: The More Than Project"			Previously Miss Pennsylvania's Outstanding Teen 2016
Rhode Island	Abby Mansolillo	23	Providence	Film Dialogue, "On the Basis of Sex"	"Trust Your Gut: Be Your Own Health Advocate"			
South Carolina	Jill Dudley	23	Myrtle Beach	Vocal	"Luke's Legacy: Advocacy for Diabetes Education, Prevention and Affordable Insulin for All"			
South Dakota	Hunter Widvey	23	Rapid City	Vocal	"Childhood Cancer Awareness"		Women in STEM Finalist	Previously Miss South Dakota's Outstanding Teen 2016
Tennessee	Lauren Dickson	24	Parsons	Vocal	"Heart for the Hungry: Overcoming Food Insecurity"			
Texas	Averie Bishop	25	Dallas	Vocal	"Y'all Means All"	Second Runner-up	Women in Business Winner Women Who Brand Winner Equity and Justice Finalist	First Asian American to win Miss Texas
Utah	Lindsey Larsen	21	Lehi	Ballet en Pointe	"The MOVEMENT Movement"		Non-Finalist Talent	
Vermont	Alexina Federhen	24	Bennington	Vocal	"Reach Out, Speak Out"		Women Who Brand Finalist	Previously Miss Vermont's Outstanding Teen 2014
Virginia	Victoria Chuah	23	Ashburn	Ballet en Pointe	"4A: Advocacy and Awareness for Adults with Autism"		Women in STEM Finalist	
Washington	Regan Gallo	23	Puyallup	Dance	"Making the Invisible Visible: Advocating for Those with Chronic Disease"			
West Virginia	Elizabeth Lynch	25	Martinsburg	Original Monologue, "It's Not Just Dirt"	"Growing Up, Growing Ag"	Third Runner-up		
Wisconsin	Grace Stanke	20	Wausau	Violin	"Clean Energy, Cleaner Future"	Winner	Preliminary Talent Award	Previously Miss Wisconsin's Outstanding Teen 2017
Wyoming	Hazel Homer-Wambeam	21	Laramie	Musical Theater Performance	"EveryBODY Dance! Body Positivity through Movement"		Top Fundraiser 4th Runner-up	Previously Distinguished Young Woman (DYW) of Wyoming 2019, National DYW (formerly Junior Miss) winner of Self-Expression Category. Lifetime National Endowment for the Humanities (NEH) Scholar. National winner both 1st and 2nd place, National History Day (NHD) competition in performance and documentary categories.

== Controversy and criticism ==
In an effort to move away from its central focus as a beauty contest, the M.A. Organization removed the bathing suit competition and distanced itself from sexist roots of the past in 2018. Critics allege that the competition still objectifies participants and women generally, with one journalist arguing that "these females, beautiful or otherwise, need not continue being judged on and selected for their appearance (according to many women [and to some men], whether or not they monitor Miss America contests or may be Miss Americas themselves." Likewise, the clothes worn by some Miss Americas, particularly since 1983, are scrutinized for promoting objectification.

2023 marks the second year of the final competition night and crowning not being aired on mainstream television. The 2022 Miss America competition was streamed on NBC's Peacock and had several technical glitches throughout the show, causing many viewers to complain on social media about the production value. Streaming the 2022 competition on Peacock was free, but the 2023 competition could only be streamed on PageantsLive.com, requiring the site's US$30 per month fee to watch.
