= Dane Manor =

Farmhouse in Middletown, New York, US

- Interactive map of the Dane Manor area
- Alternative names: Jacob Mills House

General information
- Status: Private residence
- Type: farmhouse
- Location: 447 Scotchtown Collabar Road; Middletown, New York, U.S.
- Coordinates: 41°30′10″N 74°20′41″W
- Owner: Taryn Delanie Smith

Dane Manor, also known as the Jacob Mills House, is a historic farmhouse in Middletown, Orange County, New York. It was built in 1791 for Jacob Mills.

== History ==
The Dutch sandstone house was built in 1791 in the Hudson Valley region of New York. The 4,184-square-foot-home was built for Jacob Mills, a postmaster and tanner who made shoes for Continental Army soldiers during the American Revolutionary War. Mills arrived in the Province of New York in the 1760s as an indentured servant from England. The property remained in Mills' family until the 1980s.

The interior of the house features five bedrooms. A kitchen was added on to the house in 1992. The grounds, stretching 3.7 acres, include a pool.

In 2025, the property was purchased by Taryn Delanie Smith, who renamed it "Dane Manor" in honor of her pet Great Dane, Bruce. Smith is the first Black person and first woman to own the property. The house has been undergoing renovations since 2025.
