= Trial by Fire (Spence book) =

- First edition
- Author: Gerry Spence
- Language: English
- Subject: Law
- Genre: Non-fiction
- Publisher: William Morrow & Co
- Publication date: 1986
- Publication place: United States
- Media type: Hardcover
- Pages: 503
- ISBN: 0-688-06075-7
- Dewey Decimal: 345.73/0256 347.305256 19
- LC Class: KF228.P76 S63 1986

Trial by Fire is a book written by attorney Gerry Spence, which recounts the events surrounding the libel lawsuit brought by former Miss Wyoming Kim Pring against Penthouse Magazine in 1980. Pring had been sexually ridiculed in Hustler magazine after becoming Miss Wyoming, and Spence argued that her right to privacy as a non-public persona had been violated.
