= Terry Meeuwsen =

American journalist

Terry Meeuwsen Friedrich
- Born: March 2, 1949 (age 77); De Pere, Wisconsin, U.S.
- Education: St. Norbert College
- Occupations: Television personality, author, singer, philanthropist
- Years active: 1972–present
- Organization: Orphan's Promise
- Known for: Co-host, The 700 Club
- Notable credit: A New Day (WTMJ-TV NBC News Local) (1978–1986)
- Television: The 700 Club (1993–present)
- Title: Miss Appleton 1972; Miss Wisconsin 1972; Miss America 1973
- Predecessor: Laurel Schaefer
- Successor: Rebecca Ann King
- Spouses: Thomas A. Camburn (m. 1974; div. 1981) Andy Friedrich (m. 1981; died 2023)
- Children: 7

Terry Anne Meeuwsen Friedrich (born March 2, 1949) is an American television personality, author, and singer. She is best known as the co-host of the Christian Broadcasting Network (CBN)'s The 700 Club since 1993. Meeuwsen is the founder of Orphan’s Promise, a philanthropic organization leading charity efforts for orphans, especially advocating for help in Ukraine.

Meeuwsen was the 1972 Miss Appleton, 1972 Miss Wisconsin and the winner of the Miss America pageant in 1973, taking both the talent and swimsuit competitions. She was the first Miss Wisconsin delegate to hold the Miss America title.

== Early life ==
Meeuwsen was born in 1949 in Green Bay, Wisconsin to Joseph and Beverly (née Anderson). She was the eldest of four children. Her father worked for the Wisconsin Public Service Corporation, while her mother worked for the Wisconsin Telephone Company in her early years then worked until retirement for the Superintendent of Schools.

At De Pere High School, Meeuwsen was selected homecoming queen, and was also a cheerleader for three years. She enrolled at the private liberal arts college, St. Norbert College in fall of 1967. She studied music and drama, but didn’t earn a degree. Between 1969 and 1971, Meeuwsen performed and traveled with the singing group The New Christy Minstrels, but left the group to enter the Miss America pageant preliminary competitions.

After winning the 1972 Miss Appleton and 1972 Miss Wisconsin competitions, Meeuwsen competed in the 1973 Miss America Competition. A fellow competitor included Cynthia Sikes (Miss Kansas; known at the time as Cindy Lee Sikes), who would later become an actress, starring on the NBC medical drama St. Elsewhere. Meeuwsen also competed against Jane Badler, who would become an actress on the 1983 science-fiction miniseries, V. During the competition, Meeuwsen won both the Lifestyle and Fitness and Talent awards, before ultimately winning the title of Miss America 1973.

== Career ==
=== Early career ===
Following her reign as Miss America, Meeuwsen began television work at WTMJ-TV in Milwaukee in 1978, co-hosting (with Pete Wilson) a daily morning news and feature program, "A New Day." She left the station in 1986.

=== Christian Broadcasting Network ===
In 1981, Meeuwsen accepted a position at The Christian Broadcasting Network (CBN) in Virginia Beach, VA, as co-host of United States Mornings ("USAM"), a proposed news and features program, with veteran newsman Brian Christie joining her as co-host. The 30-minute daily morning show was sold to network affiliates (ABC, CBS, NBC) for access via satellite as a lead-in to their popular morning network shows. (At the time, affiliates typically aired color bars from the previous night's sign-off until the morning network feed began; offering high-profile personality programming to early morning viewers soon led to networks developing their own proprietary lead-ins.)

After appearing on The 700 Club several times in the late 1980s and early 1990s as a guest co-host, she became a permanent co-host in 1993, sitting daily beside CBN founder Pat Robertson. Since 2000, she has co-hosted the CBN show, Living the Life, with comedian Louise DuArt. Both shows air on Freeform.

In her time at The 700 Club, Meeuwsen has covered a range of interviews, especially stories of women such as death row inmate Karla Faye Tucker and Barbara Bush.

=== Orphan's Promise ===
In 2006, Meeuwsen founded Orphan’s Promise, a non-profit organization benefiting orphans. The organization operates in 69 countries around the world, including in Ukraine, from where Meeuwsen and her husband adopted three children. In 2022, it was reported that Orphan’s Promise has impacted 114,000 children worldwide. Orphan's Promise is a part of the Christian Broadcasting Network’s goodwill arm.

=== Other ventures ===
On September 12, 1995, Meeuwsen released the pop recording, Eyes of My Heart with Star Song Productions. The album was produced by Cliff Downs.

In 1999, Meeuwsen toured with the Aspiring Women Conference, featuring speakers Twila Paris, Lisa Bevere, Stormie Omartian and others. In 2000, she toured with the Women of Faith Group led by Sheila Walsh.

== Personal life ==
Meeuwsen was married to sales manager, Thomas A. Camburn from 1974 until 1979.

In 1981, Meeuwsen married her second husband, Andy Friedrich. They were married until his death from Parkinson's disease on July 29, 2023 at the age of 76. The couple has strongly advocated adoption, and most of their children are adopted. Their youngest three girls were adopted from Ukraine. The couple have seven children.

== Bibliography ==
Meeuwsen began writing in the 1990s and has released several books since her first in 1996. She co-authored The Millennium Hope (Answers to Your Most Critical Concerns) with her 700 Club colleague, Pat Robertson. In 2004 she narrated Robertson’s audio book Courting Disaster: How The Supreme Court Is Usurping The Power Of Congress And The People.

Meeuwsen has contributed to books on adoption, a subject close to her family. She wrote the foreword for the book, Adopted in 2008. In 2011, Meeuwsen wrote the foreword for Mardie Caldwell and Heather Featherston's book Called to Adoption: A Christian's Guide to Answering the Call.

- Meeuwsen, Terry: Christmas Memories. Thomas Nelson Publishers, 1996. ISBN 0785272534.
- Meeuwsen, Terry: Near to the Heart of God. Thomas Nelson Publishers, 1998. ISBN 0785270604.
- Meeuwsen, Terry: Just Between Friends. Thomas Nelson Publishers, 1999.ISBN 0849928834.
- Meeuwsen, Terry: The God Adventure: Embracing His Power and Purpose for You. Multnomah Publishers, 2004. ISBN 978-1590522509.

Awards and achievements
| Preceded by Laurel Schaefer | Miss America; 1973 | Succeeded by Rebecca Ann King |
| Preceded by Patti Jacobs | Miss Wisconsin; 1972 | Succeeded by Linda Henderson |
