= Miss Wisconsin's Teen =

- Formation: 2005
- Type: Beauty pageant
- Headquarters: New Berlin
- Location: Wisconsin
- Members: Miss America's Teen
- Official language: English
- Key people: Meghan Coffey DeMore
- Website: Official Website

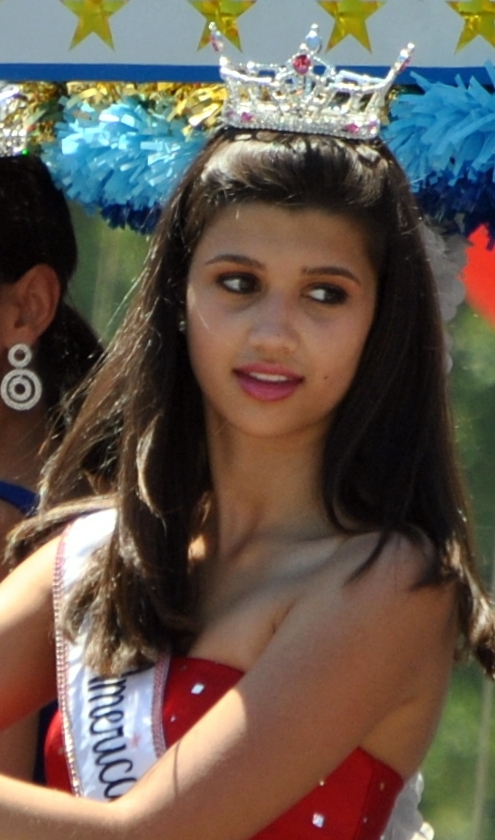
Jeanette Morelan, Miss Wisconsin's Outstanding Teen 2009 and Miss America's Outstanding Teen 2010

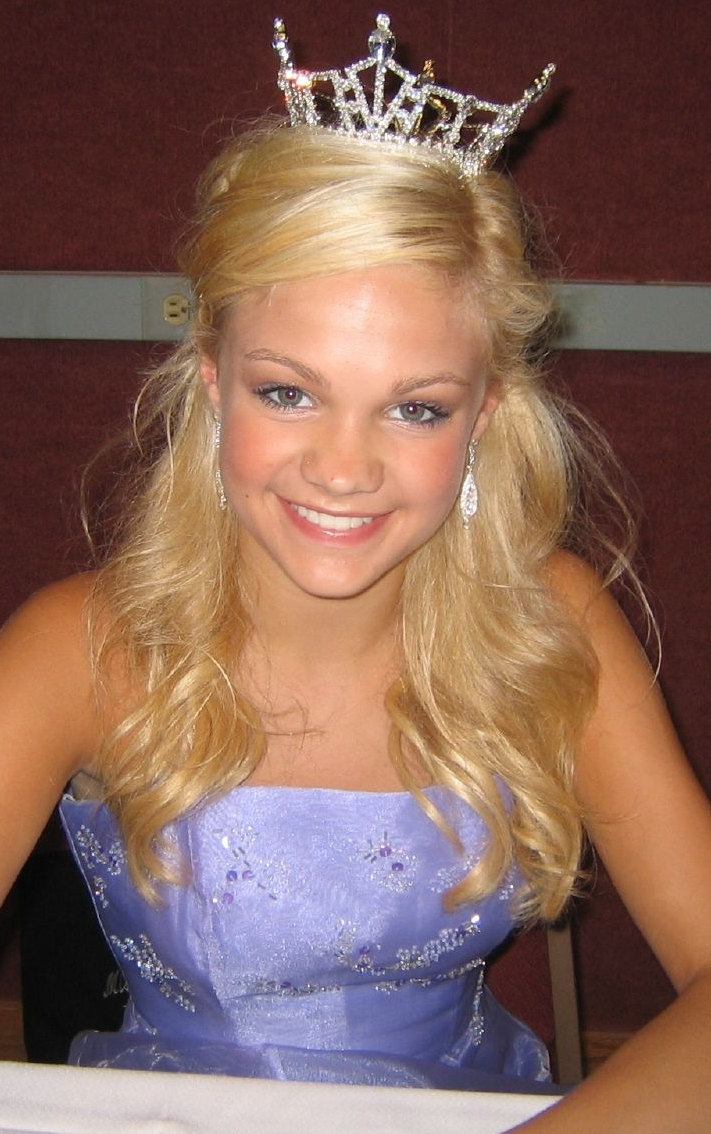
Allie Rick, Miss Wisconsin's Outstanding Teen 2006

The Miss Wisconsin's Teen competition is the pageant that selects the representative for the U.S. state of Wisconsin in the Miss America's Teen pageant. The pageant is held each June in New Berlin, Wisconsin.

First-time state competitor Meredith Rosemurgy of Fitchburg was crowned Miss Wisconsin's Teen 2026 on June 19, 2026, at the West Performing Arts Center in New Berlin. She competed for the title of Miss America's Teen 2027 on September 5, 2026, at the Kravis Center for the Performing Arts in West Palm Beach, Florida.

In 2023, the national pageant program changed the name of all state teen titles, removing the word "Outstanding".

On September 17, 2024, the state pageant announced that the Miss Wisconsin's Teen pageant (as well as the Miss Wisconsin pageant) will be held in New Berlin, Wisconsin. This will mark the first time that Waukesha County will host the annual state pageants. The Wisconsin teenager pageant began in Oshkosh in June 2005.

== Results summary ==
The results of Miss Wisconsin's Teen as they participated in the national Miss America's Teen competition. The year in parentheses indicates the year of the Miss America's Teen competition the award/placement was garnered.

=== Placements ===
- Miss America's Outstanding Teen: Jeanette Morelan (2010)
- Top 10: Allie Rick (2007), Bishara Dorre (2008), JamieNicole Morelan (2014)
- Top 11: Kylene Elizabeth Spanbauer (2017)

=== Awards ===
==== Preliminary awards ====
- Preliminary Lifestyle and Fitness: Bishara Dorre (2008)
- Preliminary Talent: Kylene Elizabeth Spanbauer (2017)

==== Non-finalist awards ====
- Non-finalist Talent: Elise O'Connell (2015)

==== Other awards ====
- Top 5 Interview: JamieNicole Morelan (2014)
- Teens in Action Award Finalist: Natalie Popp (2026), Meredith Rosemurgy (2027)

== Winners ==
- Declared as Winner
- Ended as a runner-up
- Ended as a finalist or semi-finalist

Year	Name	Hometown	Age	Local Title	Talent	Placement at MAO Teen	Special scholarships at MAO Teen	Notes
2026	Meredith Rosemurgy	Fitchburg	16	Miss Madison’s Teen	Ballet		Teens in Action Award Finalist	
2025	Natalie Popp	Fitchburg	17	Miss Capital City's Teen	Vocal		Teens in Action Award Finalist	
2024	Ella Marie Julianne Bey	Pewaukee	15	Miss Foot of the Lake's Teen	Dance			First bi-racial teenager to win the state teen pageant; Later Miss Wisconsin Teen Volunteer 2026; 3rd runner-up at Miss Teen Volunteer America 2027
2023	Trinity Faith Horstman	Onalaska	17	Miss Crossing Rivers' Teen	Tap Dance "The Devil Went Down to Georgia"			Younger sister of Miss Wisconsin's Outstanding Teen 2019-2020, Savannah Horstman
2022	Evelyn Rose Green	Oshkosh	17	Miss Oshkosh's Outstanding Teen	Baton/Twirl			
2021	Eve Rosemary Vanden Heuvel	Freedom	17	Miss Green Bay Area's Outstanding Teen	Piano			
2019-20	Savannah Grace Horstman	Onalaska	17	Miss Onalaska’s Outstanding Teen	Vocal, "Finding Wonderland" from Wonderland: A New Alice			Older sister of Miss Wisconsin's Teen 2023, Trinity Horstman
2018	Mandi Jo Genord	Montello	16	Miss Northern Lights' Outstanding Teen	Dance, Glee cover of "I Dreamed a Dream" from Les Misérables			Later Miss Wisconsin 2024 3rd runner-up at Miss Wisconsin Teen USA 2018 and 2021 pageants 4th runner-up at Miss Wisconsin Teen USA 2020 pageant
2017	Grace Marie Stanke	Wausau	15	Miss Harbor Cities' Outstanding Teen	Violin, "Winter" by Vivaldi			Later Miss Wisconsin 2022 and Miss America 2023 Top 11 at Miss Wisconsin 2021 Previously Outstanding American Miss Jr. Miss 2015
2016	Kylene Elizabeth Spanbauer	Fond du Lac	17	Miss Fond du Lac's Outstanding Teen	Dance/Twirl, "Explosive" by Bond	Top 11	Preliminary Talent Award	1st runner-up at Miss Wisconsin 2022 Later Miss Wisconsin 2022; assumed the title after Grace Stanke won Miss America 2023
2015	Jordenne Demiree Butler	Onalaska	16	Miss River City's Outstanding Teen	Lyrical Dance, Glee cover of "I Dreamed a Dream" from Les Misérables			4th runner-up at Miss Wisconsin 2022 1st runner-up at Miss Wisconsin 2021 Later Miss Wisconsin 2026
2014	Elise MacKenzie O'Connell	Trevor	17	Miss Fox River Valley's Outstanding Teen	Musical Theatre Vocal, "On My Way" from Violet		Non-finalist Talent Award	Previously National American Miss Wisconsin Pre-Teen 2008 2nd runner-up at Miss Wisconsin 2018 and 2019 pageants Later, Miss Chicago 2023
2013	JamieNicole Morelan	Racine	16	Miss Racine's Outstanding Teen	Vocal, "Don't Rain on My Parade"	Top 10	Top 5 Interview Award	Sister of Miss Wisconsin's Outstanding Teen 2009 and Miss America's Outstanding Teen 2010, Jeanette Morelan Previously National American Miss Wisconsin Princess 2003 Previously National American Miss Wisconsin Pre-Teen 2010 Later Distinguished Young Woman of Wisconsin 2015
2012	Madeline Carol Morgan	Oregon	16	Miss West Allis' Outstanding Teen	Piano, “She Sings”			Previously National American Miss Wisconsin Jr Teen 2011
2011	Ann (Annie) Marie Jorgensen	Milwaukee	16	Miss Milwaukee's Outstanding Teen	Dance, "Cosmic Dance" by Florence and the Machine			Later Miss Georgia 2018
2010	Teaka Marie Griesbach	Combined Locks	15	Miss Milwaukee's Outstanding Teen	Dance			Previously National American Miss Wisconsin Jr Teen 2009 1st runner-up at Miss Wisconsin Teen USA 2013 pageant 2nd runner-up at Miss Wisconsin Teen USA 2014 pageant 3rd runner-up at Miss Wisconsin USA 2016 pageant 2nd runner-up at Miss Wisconsin USA 2017 and 2018 pageants 1st runner-up at Miss Wisconsin USA 2019 pageant
2009	Kiersten Anne Gonzales	Pleasant Prairie	17	Miss Milwaukee's Outstanding Teen	Vocal, "The Art Is Calling for Me"	N/A		Assumed title when Morelan was named Miss America's Outstanding Teen 2010
2009	Jeanette Helen Morelan	Racine	15	Miss Southern Wisconsin's Outstanding Teen	Vocal, “Think of Me” from The Phantom of The Opera	Winner		Sister of Miss Wisconsin's Outstanding Teen 2013, JamieNicole Morelan Previously National American Miss Wisconsin Jr Pre-Teen 2004 Previously National American Miss Wisconsin Pre-Teen 2006 Later Distinguished Young Woman of Wisconsin 2012 4th runner-up at Miss Tennessee 2016 pageant
2008	Jennifer Frances Dombrowski	Milwaukee	17	Miss Milwaukee's Outstanding Teen	Irish Step Dance			Later United States of America's Mrs. Wisconsin 2024 Top 12 at United States of America's Mrs. 2024 pageant
2007	Bishara Abridasheed Dorre	Milwaukee	17	Miss Milwaukee's Outstanding Teen	Dance	Top 10	Preliminary Lifestyle and Fitness Award	Previously Miss Wisconsin Teen USA 2006; Previously National American Miss Wisconsin Jr Teen 2004 Previously National American Miss Wisconsin Teen 2008 Previously National American Miss Wisconsin 2009 Previously National American Miss 2010 Later Miss Wisconsin USA 2014; Top 10 at Miss USA 2014 pageant
2006	Alexandra (Allie) Rick	Greendale	15	At-Large	Dance	Top 10		
2005	Tonya Marie Popowski	St. Francis	17	Miss West Allis' Outstanding Teen	Dance/Twirl			
