= Taryn Delanie Smith =

African-American beauty pageant competitor (b. 1996)

- Born: September 23, 1996 (age 30)
- Education: St. John's University
- Occupations: Beauty pageant competitor, TikToker
- Spouse: Alec Castillo
- Beauty pageant titleholder
- Title: Miss Northwest 2017; Miss Greater New York 2022; Miss New York 2022
- Years active: 2017–present
- Major competition: Miss America 2023 (first runner-up)

Instagram information
- Page: Taryn Delanie
- Followers: 1.6 million

TikTok information
- Page: Taryn Delanie
- Years active: 2021–present
- Followers: 1.7 million
- Last updated: September 14, 2026

Taryn Delanie Smith (born 23 September 1996) is an American beauty pageant titleholder and TikToker. She was crowned Miss New York 2022, and was named first runner-up in the Miss America 2023 competition.

== Early life and education ==
Smith was raised in Seattle, Washington, where she experienced housing insecurity as a child.

She attended St. John's University, where she earned a Bachelor's in communication studies and a Master's in International Communication & Intercultural Studies. She worked as a receptionist at a call center to finance her education.

== Pageants ==
Smith was first inspired to participate in pageants during a talent show in high school, when one of her teachers suggested she compete for Miss America. She began competing at age 17, and placed as second runner-up for the Miss Washington 2017 title on July 1, 2017 while competing as Miss Northwest 2017.

Smith was crowned Miss New York 2022 on May 29, 2022 while competing as Miss Greater New York 2022. She was the first Black Miss New York to be crowned while wearing her natural hair. For her advocacy work in the role, Smith focused on initiatives to assist those experiencing homelessness. She was named first runner-up in the Miss America 2023 competition on December 15, 2022.

== Online presence ==
Smith began posting on TikTok in 2021. In March 2023 Smith posted a video where she played Denise, a receptionist in Heaven, which quickly went viral. She continued to focus on sketches about Denise and her job. As of May 2023 she had 1.2 million followers.

== Personal life ==
Smith married personal trainer and business owner Alec Castillo on July 24, 2024.

Smith lives in upstate New York. In 2025, she purchased the Jacob Mills House, an 18th-century farmhouse in Orange County, which she renamed "Dane Manor" after her pet Great Dane, Bruce.

Awards and achievements
Preceded by Sydney Park	Miss New York; 2022	Succeeded by Amelia Collins
