= Angie Chen Button =

Texas businesswoman and politician

- 陳筱玲
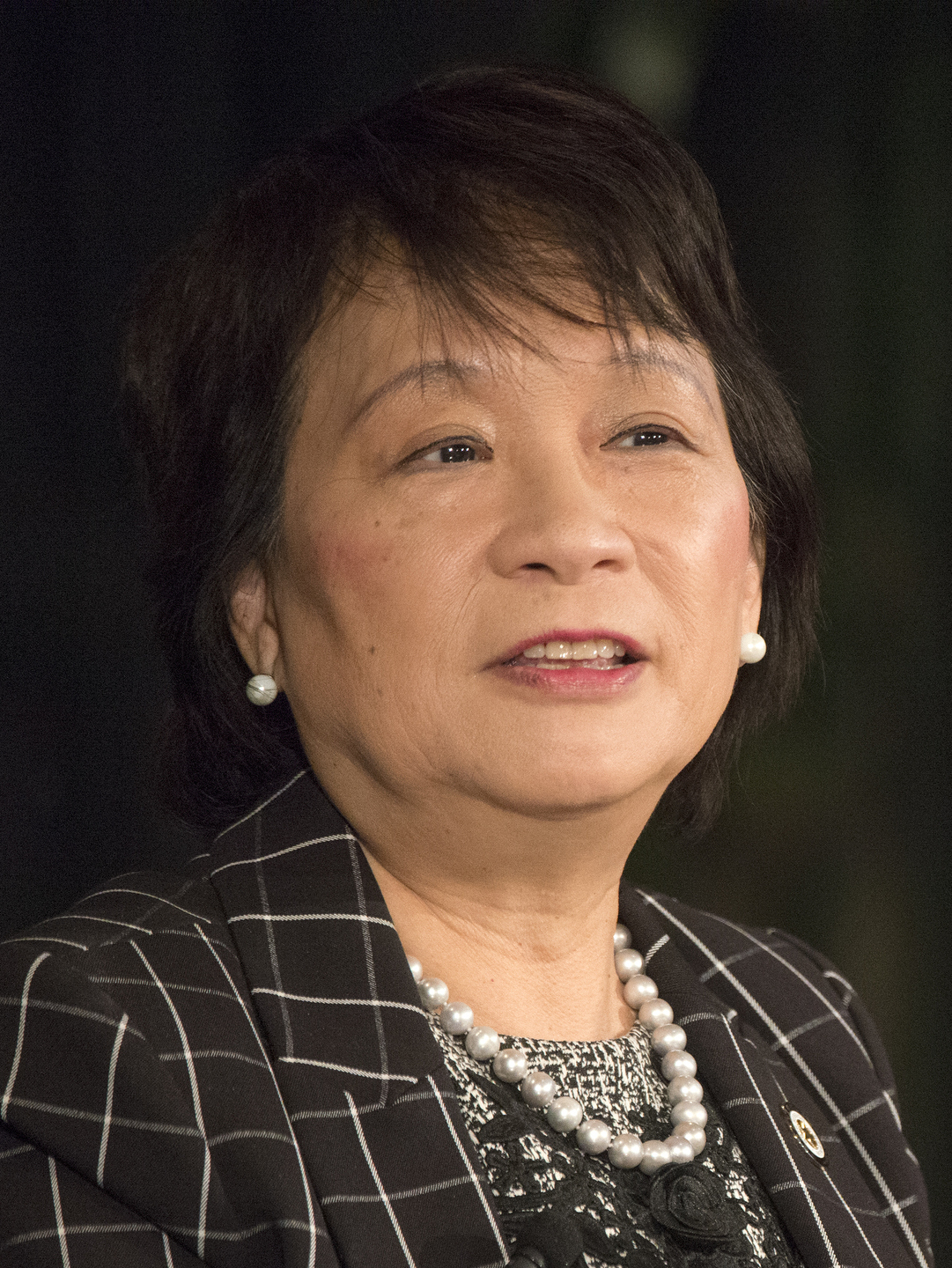
- Button in 2019

Member of the Texas House of Representatives from the 112th district
- Incumbent
- Assumed office January 13, 2009
- Preceded by: Fred Hill

Personal details
- Born: February 9, 1954 (age 72) Taipei, Taiwan
- Party: Republican
- Education: National Taiwan University (BS); University of Texas at Dallas (MS)
- Occupation: Businesswoman
- Website: Campaign website

Angie Chen Button (Chinese: 陳筱玲; pinyin: Chén Xiǎolíng; born February 9, 1954) is a Taiwanese-born American politician, certified public accountant, and former marketing manager. She is a Republican member of the Texas House of Representatives, representing the 112th district in Dallas County since 2009.

== Early life and education ==
Button was born in Taipei, Taiwan, to waishengren parents who fled mainland China during the Great Retreat. The family of 7 lived in a 300-square foot, one-room hut without a bathroom or a kitchen. She graduated from National Taiwan University and immigrated to the United States to attend graduate school at the University of Texas at Dallas, where she met her husband Darcy Button. She proceeded to work as an accountant and marketing director.

== Political career ==
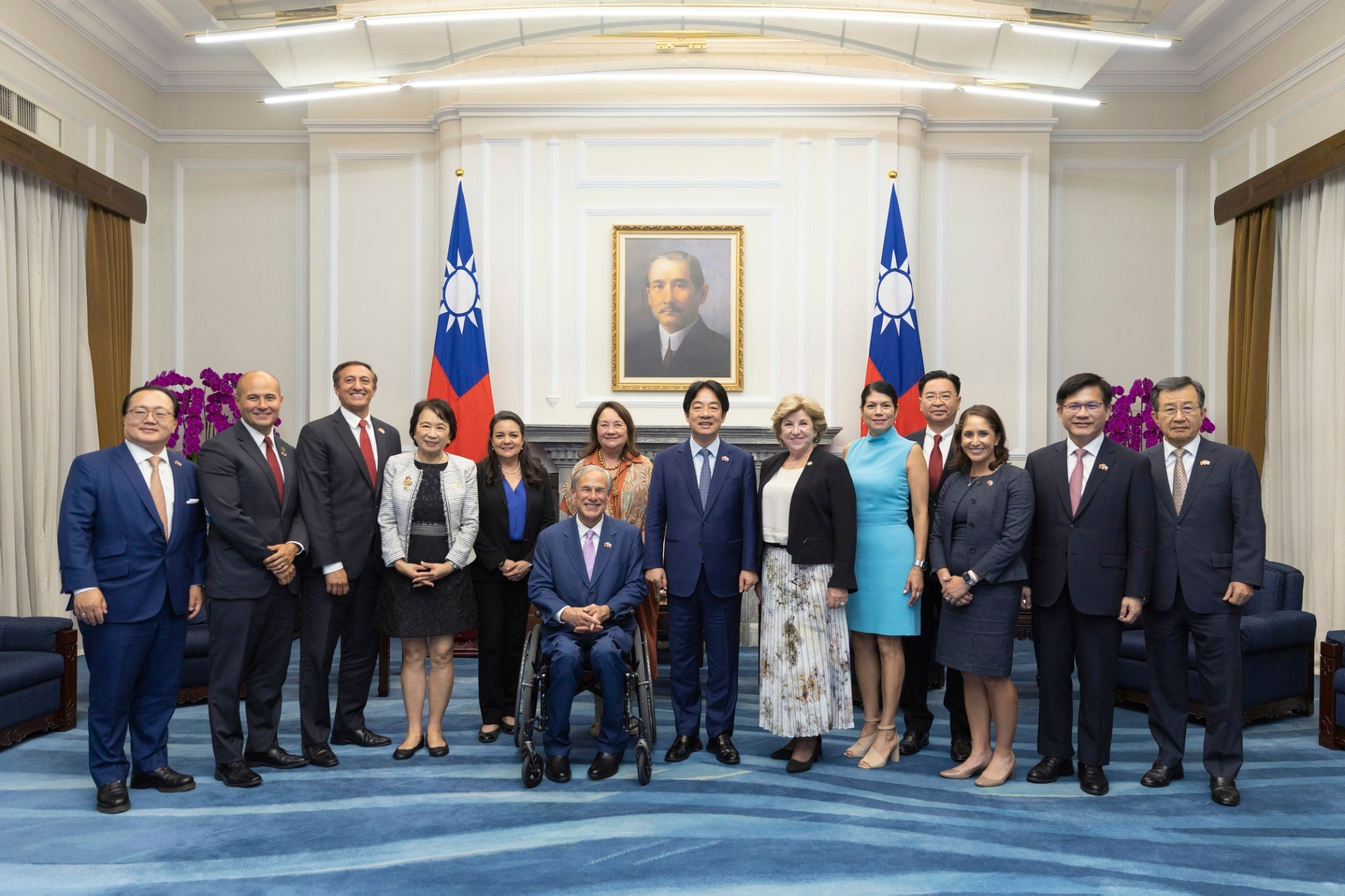
Texas delegation meets with Lai Ching-te in 2024.

Following incumbent Frank Hill's retirement in 2008, then-State Senator Florence Shapiro called Button and suggested she run for the seat.

Button is currently the chair of the House Committee on International Relations and Economic Development and serves as a member of the Ways and Means Committee. In its annual review, Texas Monthly named Button one of the state's best legislators in 2021 for her work in allocating child-care program funding.

Despite her district voting for Joe Biden by nine points in 2020, Button has garnered significant split-ticket voting and is one of two remaining Republicans in the House of Representatives from Dallas County.

In 2024, Button joined a Texas economic delegation led by Greg Abbott meeting President Lai Ching-te.

In the 2026 Midterm Elections, after an 18 year reign, Button lost her reelection bid to Zach Herbert by 8 percentage points.

Texas House of Representatives
Preceded by Fred Hill	Member of the Texas House of Representatives from the 112th district 2009–present	Incumbent
