= Grace Stanke =

American pro-nuclear energy activist (born 2002)

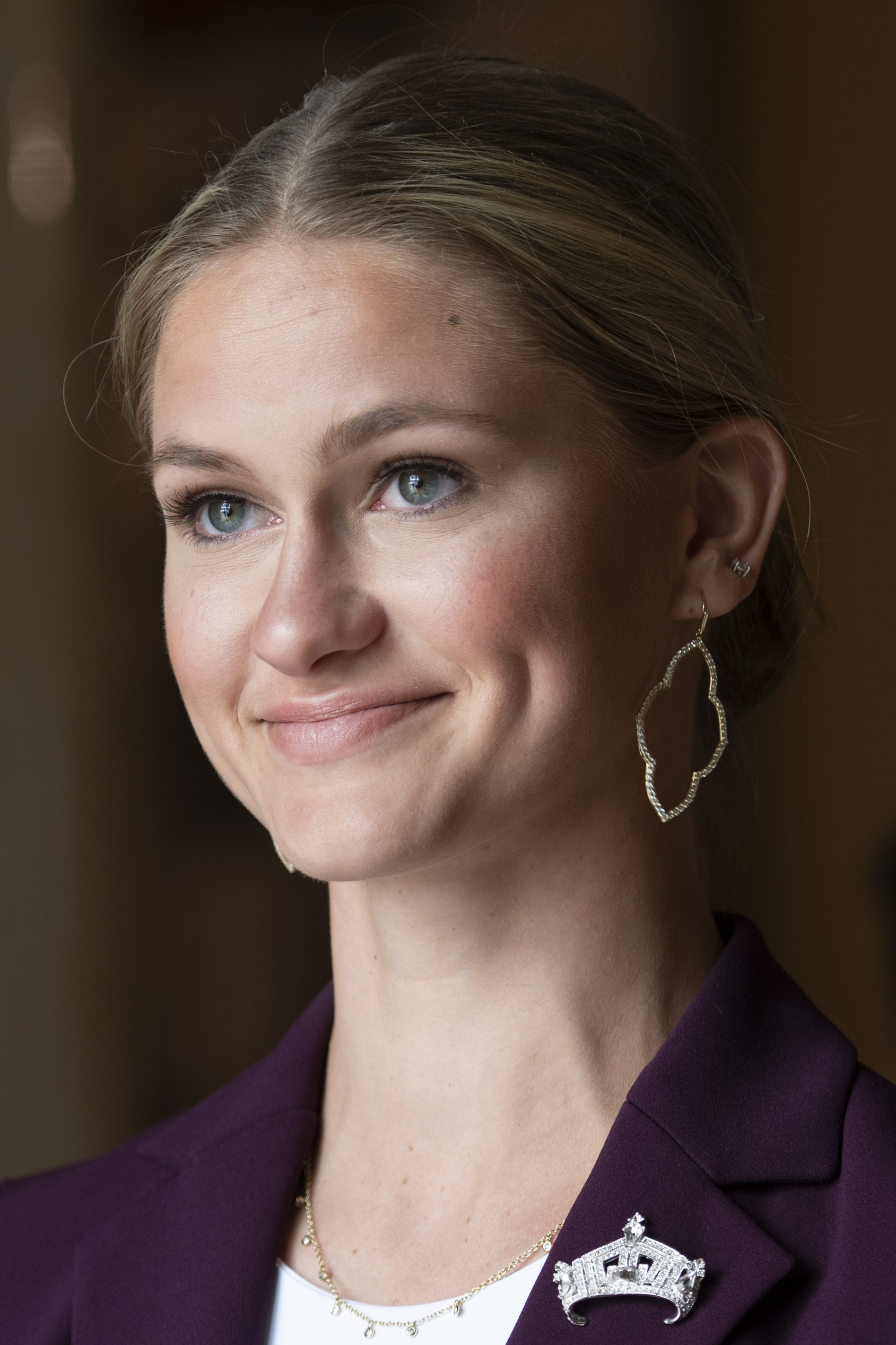
- Stanke in 2023
- Born: Grace Marie Stanke; April 30, 2002 (age 24); Wausau, Wisconsin, U.S.
- Education: University of Wisconsin–Madison
- Known for: Miss America 2023
- Height: 5 ft 11 in (1.80 m)
- Title: Miss Wausau's Outstanding Teen 2016; Miss Harbor Cities' Outstanding Teen 2017; Miss Wisconsin's Outstanding Teen 2017; Miss Madison 2021; Miss Badgerland 2022; Miss Wisconsin 2022; Miss America 2023
- Term: December 15, 2022 – January 14, 2024
- Predecessor: Emma Broyles
- Successor: Madison Marsh

Grace Marie Stanke (born April 30, 2002) is an American pro-nuclear energy activist and scholarship pageant titleholder who was crowned Miss America 2023 on December 15, 2022. A native of Wausau, Wisconsin, she is the third Miss Wisconsin to win the national title. She earned a bachelor's degree in Nuclear Engineering in 2023 from the University of Wisconsin - Madison and is currently employed by Constellation Energy as a Nuclear Fuels Engineer & Clean Energy Advocate.

== Early life and education ==
Stanke is a graduate of Wausau West High School. Her father is a civil engineer. She began competing as a local titleholder in the Miss America's Outstanding Teen pageant circuit to improve her violin skills. Stanke was crowned Miss Wausau's Outstanding Teen 2016, Miss Harbor Cities' Outstanding Teen 2017, and finally Miss Wisconsin's Outstanding Teen 2017.

Stanke started competing in the Miss America system again after she turned 18 to earn scholarship money. She competed at Miss Wisconsin 2021 as Miss Madison 2021, where she was a semi-finalist. Stanke was crowned Miss Wisconsin 2022 while competing as Miss Badgerland 2022 at Miss Wisconsin 2022 on June 18, 2022, becoming the first woman to hold both state Miss and Teen titles. In addition to the title, Stanke won Preliminary Talent and $12,500 in scholarships. She studied nuclear engineering at University of Wisconsin–Madison.

== Miss America 2023 ==
On December 15, 2022, Stanke won the title of Miss America 2023 and a $50,000 scholarship. During the competition, Stanke received a preliminary talent award and a $2,500 scholarship for her classical violin performance of "Summer: III. Presto" from the Four Seasons by Vivaldi. She spent her year as Miss America raising awareness about nuclear power and zero-carbon energy sources. During her reign, Stanke visited nuclear power plants across the United States including the Vogtle Electric Generating Plant in Georgia, the Palo Verde Nuclear Generating Station in western Arizona, and Hanford Site in Washington, and Energy Northwest in Washington. She also spoke about the benefits of nuclear power at the Dairyland Power Cooperative 2023 annual meeting in La Crosse, Wisconsin and at the American Nuclear Society's 2023 annual conference in Indianapolis, Indiana. Stanke served as the Grand Marshal of the 36th Annual Arizona Public Service Electric Light Parade.

During a 'Miss America World Tour', Stanke traveled to Canada, Fukushima, and COP28 in Dubai.

In July 2023, Stanke interviewed with CNN about the "Barbenheimer" phenomenon and her experience with both pageants and nuclear science. In September 2023, Stanke lent some of her sashes, gowns, and crowns to the Marathon County Historical Society in her hometown for an exhibit there called 'A Woman Who Can'. During her reign, the Wall Street Journal declared Stanke "the new face of nuclear energy." Stanke was named to the 2024 Forbes 30 under 30 for Energy list.

For her last appearance as Miss America (before the 2024 competition), Stanke spoke to sixth grade girls at elementary schools in Idaho Falls about STEM and nuclear engineering in a partnership with the Idaho National Laboratory.

Stanke traveled over 270,000 miles during her year as Miss America.

== Nuclear advocacy ==
Stanke completed her bachelor's degree in nuclear engineering from the University of Wisconsin-Madison in 2023. She is currently a nuclear engineer and nuclear energy advocate at Constellation Energy. Stanke continues to advocate for nuclear power and STEM (Science, Technology, Engineering, and Math) education across the United States.

In February 2025, Stanke went on a 10-day speaking tour across Australia to promote nuclear energy. She was heckled by Australian Senator Lidia Thorpe during one of the events.

== See also ==
- Isabelle Boemeke

Awards and achievements
| Preceded by Emma Broyles | Miss America; 2023 | Succeeded by Madison Marsh |
| Preceded by Jennifer Schmidt | Miss Wisconsin; 2022 | Succeeded by Kylene Spanbauer |
| Preceded by Kylene Spanbauer | Miss Wisconsin's Outstanding Teen; 2017 | Succeeded by Mandi Genord |
