= Miss America 1972 =

Beauty pageant edition

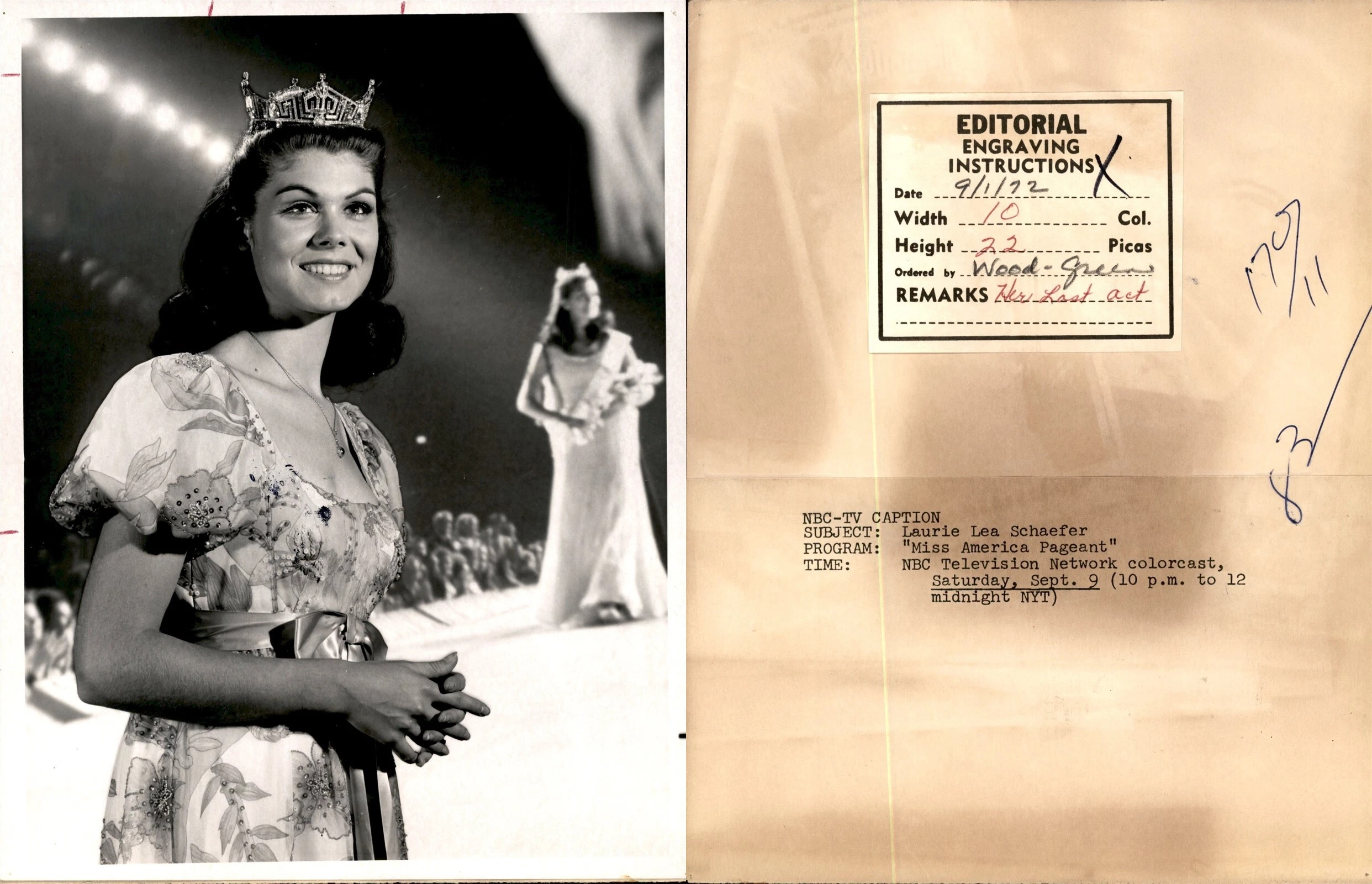
- Date: September 11, 1971
- Presenters: Bert Parks
- Venue: Boardwalk Hall, Atlantic City, New Jersey
- Broadcaster: NBC
- Winner: Laurie Lea Schaefer; Ohio

Miss America 1972, the 45th Miss America pageant, was held at the Boardwalk Hall in Atlantic City, New Jersey, on September 11, 1971, and broadcast on NBC.

Laurie Lea Schaefer, representing Ohio, was crowned Miss America 1972. She became an actress, featured on TV series such as Falcon Crest, and later a casting director and talent scout.

== Results ==
=== Placements ===
Placement	Contestant
Miss America 1972	Ohio – Laurie Lea Schaefer
1st Runner-Up	Idaho – Karen Herd
2nd Runner-Up	Massachusetts – Deborah Ann O'Brien
3rd Runner-Up	Pennsylvania – Maureen Victoria Wimmer
4th Runner-Up	Maine – Allyn E. Warner
Top 10	Georgia – Cynthia Cook; Kansas – Sandy Rings; Minnesota – Sheila Bernhagen; Nevada – Joan Burachio; Washington – Susan Buckner

=== Top 10 ===
1. Georgia
2. Maine
3. Washington
4. Pennsylvania
5. Idaho
6. Ohio
7. Kansas
8. Minnesota
9. Massachusetts
10. Nevada

=== Top 5 ===
1. Pennsylvania
2. Ohio
3. Maine
4. Massachusetts
5. Idaho

=== Awards ===
==== Preliminary ====
Awards	Contestant
Lifestyle and Fitness	California - Carolyn Jean Stoner; Ohio - Laurie Lea Schaefer; Virginia - Linda Jean Moyer (tie); (Washington (state)) Washington - Susan Buckner (tie)
Talent	(Georgia (U.S. state)) Georgia - Cynthia Cook (tie); Kansas - Sandy Rings; Maine - Allyn E. Warner; Pennsylvania - Maureen Victoria Wimmer (tie)

==== Non-finalist awards ====
Awards	Contestant
Talent	Arkansas - Marilyn Morgan; Colorado - Cathy Glau; Florida - Barbara Jo Ivey; Hawaii - Aurora Joan Ka'awa; Michigan - Linda Susan Kish; Oregon - Lynn Grenz; Vermont - Sue Glover
Special Judges/Talent Award	Alaska - Linda Joy Smith; Indiana - Pat Patterson; Oklahoma - Susan Supernaw

==== Other ====
Awards	Contestant
Neat as a Pin	Indiana – Pat Patterson (tie); New Hampshire – Kristi Carlson (tie)
Miss Congeniality	Delaware – Paula Kusmer
