= Laurie Lea Schaefer =

American actress and singer, Miss America 1972

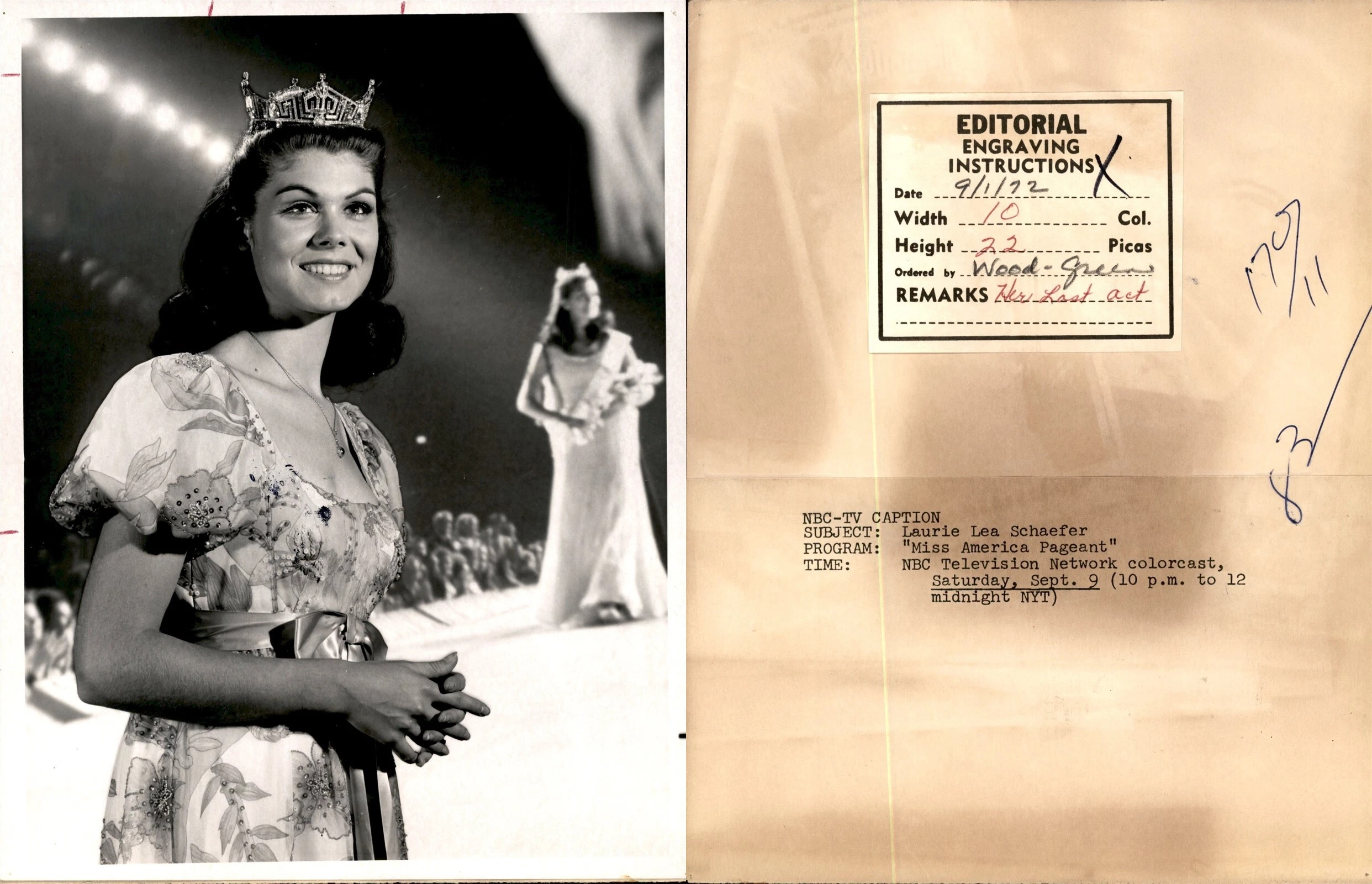
- Laurie Lea Schaefer at the Miss America Pageant in 1972
- Born: Laurel Lea Schaefer; May 21, 1949 (age 77); Bexley, Ohio, U.S.
- Education: Ohio University
- Occupations: Actress, singer
- Title: Miss Bexley 1971; Miss Ohio 1971; Miss America 1972
- Predecessor: Phyllis George
- Successor: Terry Meeuwsen
- Spouse(s): John Lurie (1973-1977; divorced), Michael Bozoukoff (2015-present)

Laurie Lea Schaefer aka Laurel Lea Schaefer (born May 21, 1949) was Miss America 1972. A native of Bexley, Ohio, she received a Bachelor of Fine Arts Degree from Ohio University in June 1971. Three months later, she won the Miss America pageant.

== Biography ==
She parlayed her theatre arts and music degree into a stage career. Her training afforded her opportunities as a leading lady to actors such as Howard Keel, John Davidson, Peter Marshall, Ed Ames, Joe Namath, Giorgio Tozzi and Gordon MacRae. She performed in productions of such musicals and plays as The Music Man, The Sound of Music, Camelot, South Pacific, Showboat, My Fair Lady, Oklahoma, Hello Dolly, Carousel, The King and I, Guys and Dolls, Anything Goes, Under the Yum-Yum Tree, Star-Spangled Girl and Plaza Suite.

Schaefer's television work includes a recurring role on Falcon Crest and guest starring roles on Matlock, L.A. Law, Quantum Leap, Love Boat, Three's Company and Rockford Files. She also played in TV commercials, including for Campbell's soup.

Schaefer's vocal career included performing the American national anthem at the inaugural concert for President Richard Nixon, headlining the Miss America USO tour to Vietnam and Thailand, entertaining on cruises with a one-woman show and singing in the "Capturing the Heart of Gershwin" anniversary concert.

Schaefer has been a commercial casting director, talent scout and owner of Creative Casting Services. In 1974, she established Schaefer Consultants, a personal imaging and entertainment career consultancy. She is a published author, keynote speaker, corporate spokesperson, infomercial host and media presenter.

Schaefer's awards include the American Academy of Achievement's Gold Plate Award, Ohio University's Outstanding Alumni Award, the Tom Dooley Humanitarian Award, New Jersey and Ohio's Woman of the Year Awards, the Ohio Governor's Award, the Bexley Alumni Association-Significant Achievement Award, a President's Award for Leadership from Zonta International and a listing in Who's Who.

=== Marriages ===
Schaefer married John Lurie in 1973; they were divorced in 1977. She married Michael Bozoukoff in 2015.

Awards and achievements
Preceded by Phyllis George	Miss America; 1972	Succeeded by Terry Meeuwsen
Preceded by Grace Bird	Miss Ohio; 1971	Succeeded by Judy Jones
