= Texas's 112th House of Representatives district =

American legislative district

Texas's 112th State House of Representatives district
Representative
Angie Chen Button; R–Dallas
- Demographics: 54.7% White; 13.3% Black; 18.2% Hispanic; 12.1% Asian
- Population (2020) • Voting age: 185,204; 144,361

The 112th district of the Texas House of Representatives contains parts of Dallas, Richardson, Garland, Sachse, Rowlett, and Sunnyvale. The current representative is Angie Chen Button, who has represented the district since 2009.

== Recent election results ==
Texas House District 112 vote by party in recent elections
Year	Democratic	Republican	Other
2024	46.02% 40,148	53.98% 47,092	-
2022	45.17% 30,946	54.83% 37,566	-
2020	48.59% 33,537	48.92% 33,759	2.49% 1,719
