= Excoriation disorder =

- Other names: Dermatillomania, skinning disorder, neurotic excoriation, acne excoriee, pathologic skin picking (PSP), compulsive skin picking (CSP), psychogenic excoriation
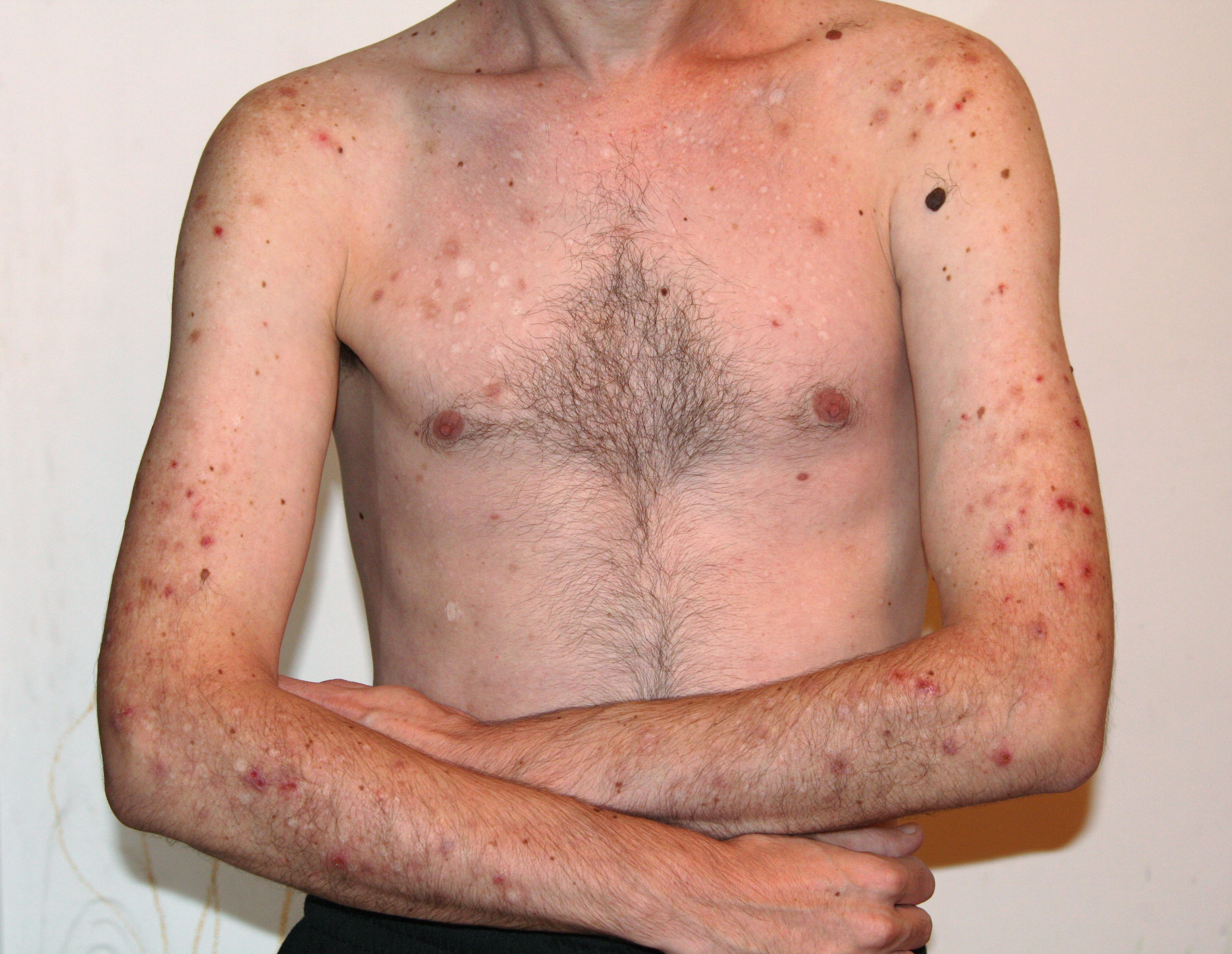
- Sores as a result of skin picking on arms, shoulders and chest
- Specialty: Dermatology; Psychiatry

Excoriation disorder, more commonly known as dermatillomania, is a mental disorder on the obsessive–compulsive spectrum that is characterized by the repeated urge or impulse to pick at one's own skin, to the extent that either psychological or physical damage is caused. The exact causes of this disorder are unclear but are believed to involve a combination of genetic, psychological, and environmental factors, including stress and underlying mental health conditions such as anxiety or obsessive–compulsive disorder (OCD). Individuals with excoriation disorder may also experience co-occurring conditions like depression or body dysmorphic disorder (BDD). Treatment typically involves cognitive behavioral therapy and may include medications. Without intervention, the disorder can lead to serious medical complications.

== Signs and symptoms ==
Episodes of skin picking are often preceded or accompanied by tension, anxiety, or stress. During these moments, there is commonly a compulsive urge to pick, squeeze, bite or scratch at a surface or region of the body, often at the location of a perceived skin defect. When picking, one may feel a sense of relief or satisfaction. In some cases, following picking, the affected person may feel depressed.

The region most commonly picked is the face, but other frequent locations include the arms, legs, back, gums, neck, shoulders, scalp, abdomen, chest, and extremities such as the fingernails, knuckles, cuticles, toenails, etc. Most patients with excoriation disorder report having a primary area of the body that they focus their picking on, but they will often move to other areas of the body to allow their primary picking area to heal. Individuals with excoriation disorder vary in their picking behavior; some do it briefly multiple times a day, while others can do one picking session that can last for hours. The most common way to pick is to use the fingers although a significant minority of people use tools such as tweezers or needles.

Skin picking often occurs as a result of some other triggering cause. Some common triggers are feeling or examining irregularities on the skin, and feeling anxiety or other negative feelings. This anxiety most commonly stems from a type of OCD, which can range in severity and often goes undiagnosed.

The act of skin picking can occur both consciously (focused picking) and unconsciously (automatic picking). Some individuals may be aware of their behavior but are unable to stop, while others may not realize they are picking until after damage has occurred. The level of awareness can fluctuate, and both forms can be present in the same person.

Complications arising from excoriation disorder include infection at the site of picking, tissue damage, and sepsis. Damage from picking can be so severe as to require skin grafting, and severe picking can cause epidermal abscesses. For example, in one reported case, a 58-year-old man with a history of OCD picked an extensive wound on his left foot, exposing underlying muscle tissue. Severe cases of excoriation disorder can cause life-threatening injuries. According to one reported case, a woman picked a hole through the bridge of her nose, which required surgery to fix, and a 48-year-old woman picked through the skin on her neck, exposing the carotid artery. Pain in the neck or back can arise due to prolonged bent-over positions while engaging in the behavior. Besides physical injuries, excoriation disorder can cause severe physical scarring and disfigurement.

Excoriation disorder can cause feelings of intense helplessness, guilt, shame, and embarrassment in individuals, and this greatly increases the risk of self-harm. Studies have shown that excoriation disorder presented suicidal ideation in 12% of individuals with this condition, suicide attempts in 11.5% of individuals with this condition, and psychiatric hospitalizations in 15% of individuals with this condition.

== Causes ==
There have been many different theories regarding the causes of excoriation disorder, including biological and environmental factors.A common hypothesis is that excoriation disorder is often a coping mechanism to deal with elevated levels of turmoil, boredom, anxiety, or stress within the individual, and that the individual has an impaired stress response. A review of behavioral studies in individuals with developmental disorders and comorbid skin-picking found support in this hypothesis, in that skin-picking appears to be maintained by automatic reinforcement within the individual.

=== Neurological ===
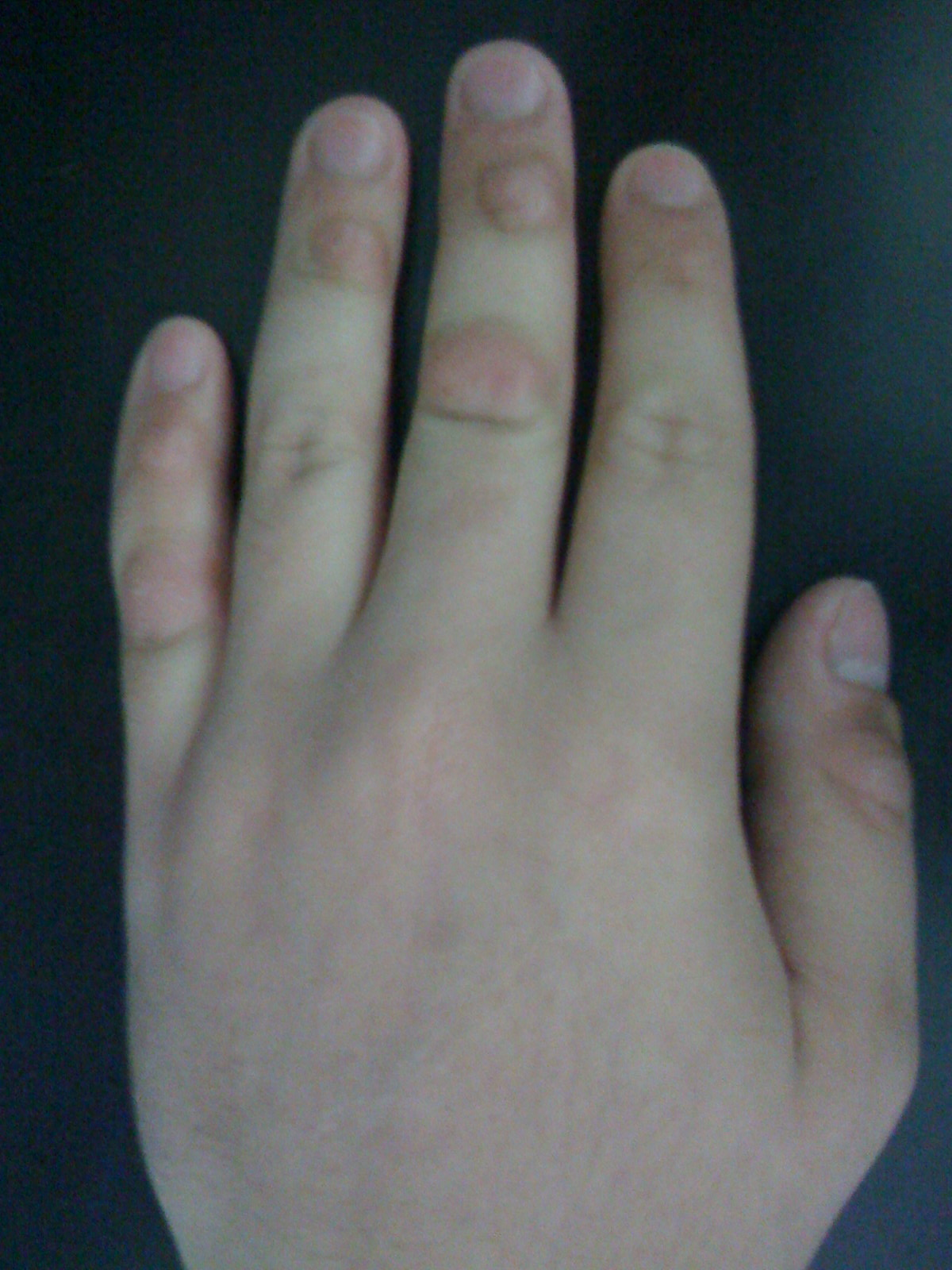
Compulsive picking of the knuckles (via mouth) illustrating potentially temporary disfiguration of the distal and proximal joints of the middle and little fingers.

There is limited knowledge regarding the neurobiology that drives excoriation disorder, and there have been few neuroimaging studies of those with excoriation disorder.

People who have excoriation disorder along with other diagnosed conditions report differing motivations for their picking. Those with both OCD and excoriation disorder report that they will pick their skin due to perceived contamination of the skin, while those with both BDD and excoriation disorder reportedly pick to fix perceived imperfections in the skin. Studies have shown a linkage between dopamine and the urge to pick. Drugs such as cocaine and methamphetamine, which increase the pharmacological effects of dopamine, have been shown to cause uncontrollable picking in users. These drugs can create the sensation of formication, which feels like something is crawling on or under the skin. Thus, excoriation disorder could result from a dysfunction in the dopamine reward functions.

There may be another neurological explanation for excoriation disorder: individuals with the condition have less motor-inhibitory control, but show no sign of a difference in cognitive flexibility when compared to individuals without the condition. Motor-inhibitory control is a function of the right-lateralized frontostriatal circuit, which includes the right inferior frontal and bilateral anterior cingulate cortices. The impairment of motor-inhibitory control is similar to the neurological conditions of those who have problems suppressing inappropriate behaviors, and it has been suggested by at least one study that this may be similar to the mechanisms of substance use disorder.

=== Genetic components ===
There is significant evidence to suggest that skin picking disorders are due to inherited traits or genes. There have been multiple small studies with similar conclusions in regards to the SAPAP3 gene. Excessive grooming by mice has been observed by researchers after the deletion of the SAPAP3 gene. This observation led researchers to study the effects of the SAPAP3 gene on patients with trichotillomania—a disorder marked by the same behaviors directed at one's own head and body hair. This study revealed a significant link between a single nucleotide polymorphism (SNP) within the SAPAP3 gene and trichotillomania.

== Diagnosis ==
There has been controversy over the creation of a separate category in the DSM-5 for excoriation (skin picking) disorder. Two of the main reasons for objecting to the inclusion of excoriation disorder in the DSM-5 are: that excoriation disorder may just be a symptom of a different underlying disorder, e.g. OCD or BDD, and excoriation disorder is merely a bad habit and that by allowing this disorder to obtain its own separate category it would force the DSM to include a wide array of bad habits as separate syndromes, e.g., nail-biting, nose-picking, hair pulling, etc. Stein has argued that excoriation disorder does qualify as a separate syndrome and should be classified as its own category because:

- Excoriation disorder occurs as the primary disorder and not as a subset of a larger disorder.
- Excoriation disorder has well-defined clinical features.
- There is gathering data on the clinical features and diagnostic criteria for this condition.
- There is sufficient data to create this as a separate category for excoriation disorder.
- The incidence rate for excoriation disorder is high within the population.
- Diagnostic criteria for the disease have already been proposed.
- The classification of excoriation disorder as a separate condition would lead to better studies and better treatment outcomes.
- Classification as a separate condition would lead to more awareness of the disorder and encourage more people to obtain treatment.

A new scale used to diagnosis excoriation was used in a recent study, and the results published in the International Journal of Environmental Research and Public Health in May 2022. The scale is titled: Diagnostic Interview for Skin Picking Problems (DISP). The DISP is designed to confirm DSM-5 criteria for the diagnosis, combined with a clinical interview to determine frequency of skin picking, and the body areas impacted. Initial results from the study (n = 120) participants show clinical confirmation at a satisfactory level with 88% of participants identified through the DISP as meeting DSM-5 criteria. Additionally, researchers conducted a 5-month period of validity to determine consistency with the scale. The data shows clinicians can expect to yield consistent data with administration of the scale ranging from satisfactory to perfect levels of diagnosis.

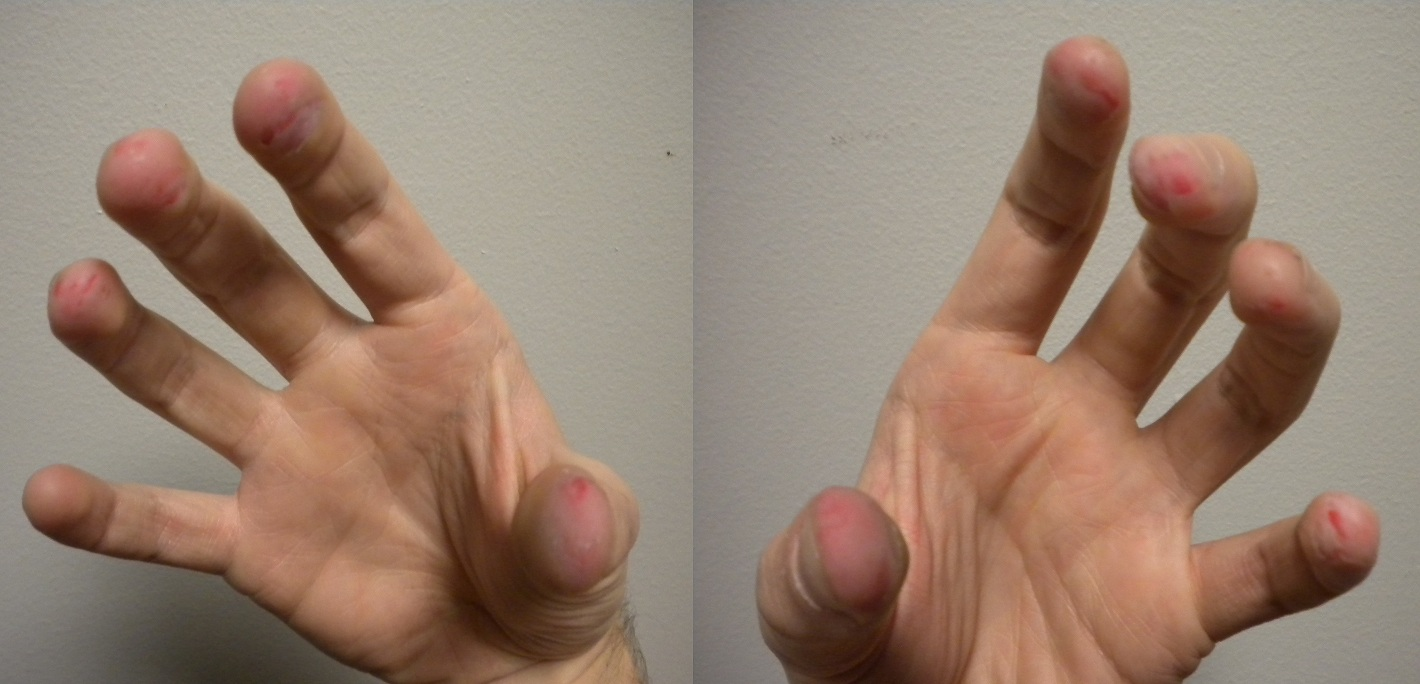
The fingers have been compulsively picked and chewed in someone with excoriation disorder and dermatophagia.

However, a review of the scientific literature by Jenkins et al. on excoriation disorder as a separate category in the DSM-5 concluded that such a distinction requires more evidence. Because excoriation disorder is different from other conditions and disorders that cause picking of the skin, any diagnosis of excoriation disorder must take into account various other medical conditions as possible causes before diagnosing the patient with excoriation disorder. There are a variety of conditions that cause itching and skin picking including: eczema, psoriasis, diabetes, liver disease, Hodgkin's disease, polycythemia vera, systemic lupus, and Prader–Willi syndrome.

In order to better understand excoriation disorder, researchers have developed a variety of scales to categorize skin-picking behavior. These include the Skin-Picking Impact Scale (SPIS) and The Milwaukee Inventory for the Dimensions of Adult Skin-picking. The SPIS was created to measure how skin picking affects the individual socially, behaviorally, and emotionally.

As of the release of the fifth Diagnostic and Statistical Manual of Mental Disorders (DSM-5) in May 2013, this disorder is classified as its own separate condition under "Obsessive Compulsive and Related Disorders" and is termed "excoriation (skin-picking) disorder". The diagnostic material is as follows:

1. Repeated picking of the skin, resulting in injuries
2. Recurring attempts to stop picking while relapses continually occur
3. Picking causes a substantial amount of distress and substantially impairs everyday functioning
4. The picking is not caused or cannot be better explained by physiological effects of a substance or a medical disorder
5. The picking is not more accurately attributed to another mental disorder

=== Classification ===
Since the DSM-5 (2013), excoriation disorder is classified as "L98.1 Excoriation (skin-picking) disorder" in ICD-10, and is no longer classified in "Impulse control disorder" (f63).Excoriation disorder is defined as "repetitive and compulsive picking of skin which results in tissue damage".

Its most official name had been "dermatillomania" for some time. As of the release of the DSM-5 in May 2013, excoriation disorder is classified as its own separate condition under "Obsessive Compulsive and Related Disorders" and is termed "excoriation (skin-picking) disorder".

==== Similarities with other conditions ====
The inability to control the urge to pick is similar to the urge to compulsively pull one's own hair, i.e., trichotillomania. Researchers have noted the following similarities between trichotillomania and excoriation disorder: the symptoms are ritualistic but there are no preceding obsessions; there are similar triggers for the compulsive actions; both conditions appear to play a role in modifying the arousal level of the subject; and the age of onset for both conditions is similar. There is also a high level of comorbidity between those that have trichotillomania and those that have excoriation disorder. A notable difference between these conditions is that skin picking seems to be dominated by females whereas trichotillomania is more evenly distributed across genders. The acronym "body focused repetitive behavior disorders" (BFRB) is used to characterize excoriation and trichotillomania behaviors. One shared behavior is continued picking as an emotional or reward sensation. This involves the picking to resolve negative thoughts or emotions or a developed behavior of automatic picking. This automatic picking becomes habitual and is a comorbidity with ADHD. In 2018, a new study on Tourette Syndrome (TS), trichotillomania, and excoriation revealed cooccurrence of the same disorders. Participants were screened by clinical staff in clinics supporting patients with Tourette Syndrome. Those patients included then completed self-report questionnaires. Of the total number of TS participants (n = 811), 13% revealed diagnosis of trichotillomania and excoriation. This significance of results was reported with the recommendation of screening in children with a diagnosis of TS. This will assist clinicians in screening for trichotillomania and excoriation or the risk factors for both. As with the adult population of women, girls are more impacted by the disorders than boys.

Research has also suggested that excoriation disorder may be thought of as a type of OCD. Excoriation disorder and OCD are similar in that they both involve "repetitive engagement in behaviors with diminished control" and also both generally decrease anxiety.

Nevertheless, Odlaug and Grant have suggested that excoriation disorder is more akin to substance use disorder than OCD. They argue that excoriation disorder differs from OCD in the following fundamental ways:

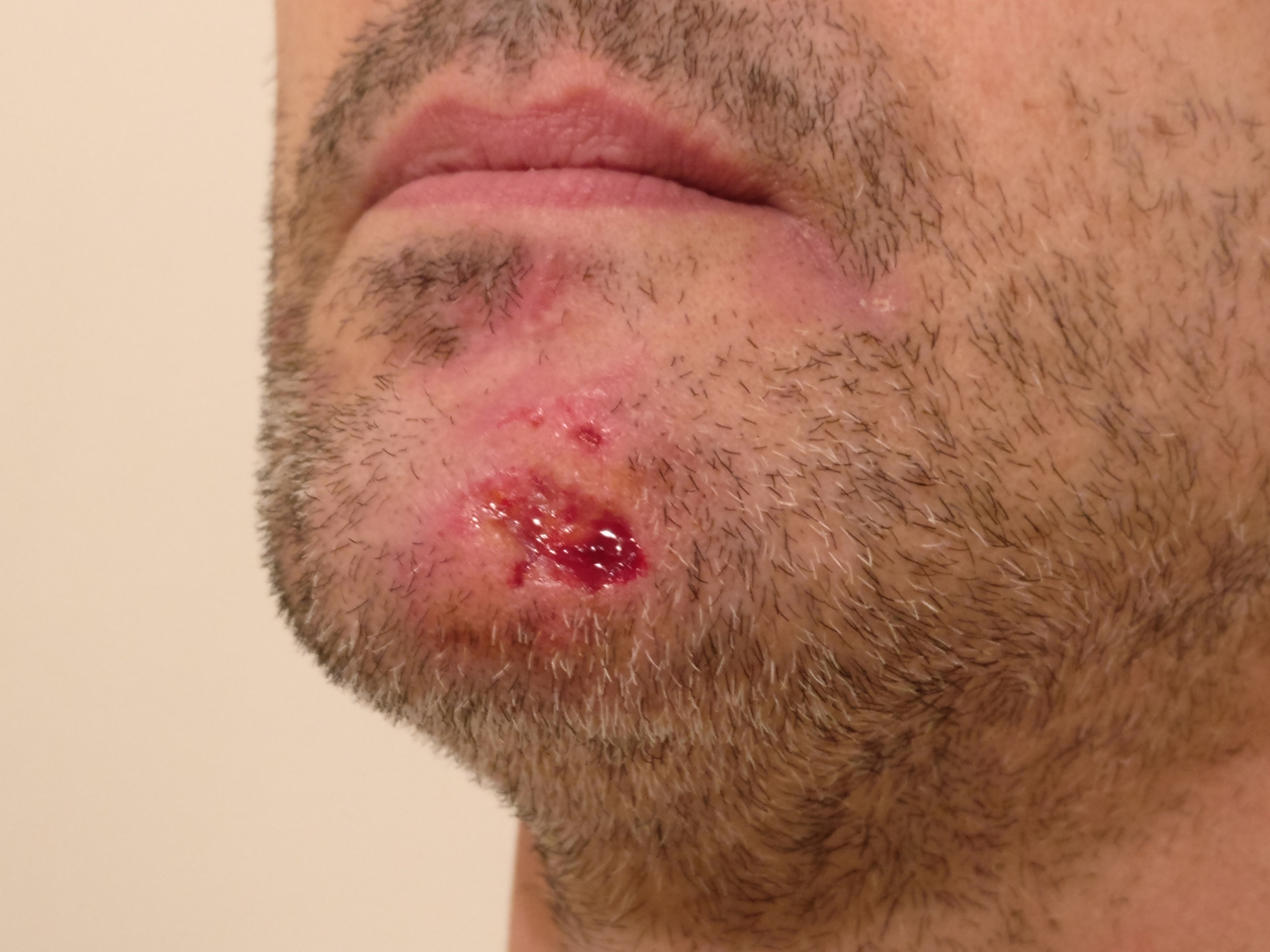
Compulsive picking of the face using nail pliers and tweezers

- There is a much greater share of females with excoriation disorder.
- Excoriation disorder may be inherently pleasurable whereas OCD is not.
- The treatments that are generally effective for patients with OCD (i. e., SSRIs and exposure therapy) are not as successful in patients with excoriation disorder.
- Unlike OCD, picking the skin is rarely driven by obsessive thoughts.

Odlaug and Grant have recognized the following similarities between individuals with dermatillomania and patients with addictions:

- Compulsion to engage in the negative behavior despite knowledge of the harm.
- Lack of control over the problematic behavior.
- Strong urge to engage in the behavior before engagement.
- Feeling of pleasure while engaging in the behavior or a feeling of relief or reduced anxiety after engaging in the behavior.

One study that supported the addiction theory of picking found that 79% of patients with excoriation disorder reported a pleasurable feeling when picking.

Odlaug and Grant also argue that dermatillomania could have several different psychological causes, which would explain why some patients seem more likely to have symptoms of OCD, and others, of an addiction. They suggest that treating certain cases of excoriation as an addiction may yield more success than treating them as a form of OCD.

== Treatment ==
Knowledge about effective treatments for excoriation disorder is sparse, despite the prevalence of the condition. There are two major classes of therapy for excoriation disorder: pharmacological and behavioral. To complement these approaches, group therapy or support groups may be used to help individuals abstain from skin picking. Among them is the abstinence-based 12-step recovery fellowship Obsessive Skin Pickers Anonymous (OSPA).

Individuals with excoriation disorder often do not seek treatment for their condition, largely due to feelings of embarrassment, alienation, lack of awareness, or belief that the condition cannot be treated. One study found that only 45% of individuals with excoriation disorder ever sought treatment, and only 19% ever received dermatological treatment. Another study found that only 30% of individuals with this disorder sought treatment.

=== Medication ===
There are several different classes of pharmacological treatment agents that have some support for treating excoriation disorder: SSRIs, opioid antagonists, anti-epileptic agents, and glutamatergic agents. In addition to these classes of drugs, some other pharmacological products have been tested in small trials as well.

Antipsychotic, antianxiety, antidepressant, and antiepileptic medications have all been used to treat skin picking, with varying degrees of success.

SSRIs have shown to be effective in the treatment of OCD, which serves as an argument in favor of treating excoriation disorder with the same therapy. Unfortunately, clinical studies have not provided clear support for this, because there have not been large double-blind placebo-controlled trials of SSRI therapy for excoriation disorder. In fact, in a meta-analysis of pharmacological treatments of excoriation disorders, it was found that selective serotonin reuptake inhibitors (SSRIs) and lamotrigine were no more effective than a placebo for longterm effects. Reviews of treatment of excoriation disorder have shown that the following medications may be effective in reducing picking behavior: doxepin, clomipramine, naltrexone, pimozide, and olanzapine. Small studies of fluoxetine, an SSRI, in treating excoriation disorder showed that the drug reduced certain aspects of skin picking compared with a placebo, but full remission was not observed. One small study of patients with excoriation disorder treated with citalopram, another SSRI, showed that those who took the drug significantly reduced their scores on the Yale–Brown Obsessive Compulsive Scale compared with a placebo, but that there was no significant decrease on the visual-analog scale of picking behavior.

While there have been no human studies of opioid antagonists for the treatment of excoriation disorder, there have been studies showing that these products can reduce self-chewing in dogs with acral lick, which some have proposed is a good animal model for body-focused repetitive behavior. Furthermore, case reports support the use of these opioid antagonists to treat excoriation disorder. Opioid antagonists work by affecting dopamine circuitry, thereby decreasing the pleasurable effects of picking.

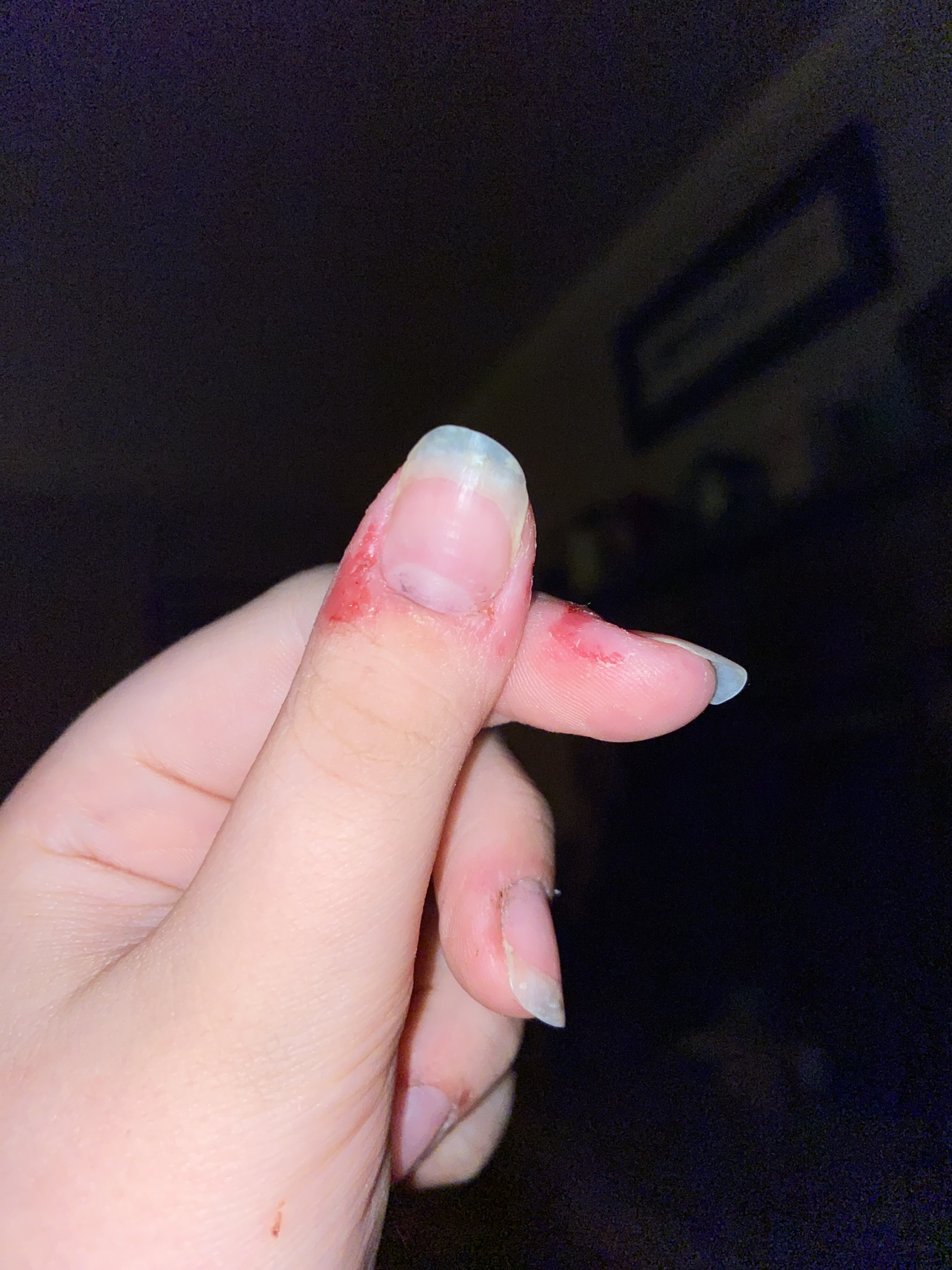
Fingers that have been "picked at" using tweezers.

Another class of possible pharmacological treatments is glutamatergic agents such as N-acetylcysteine (NAC). These products have shown some ability to reduce other problematic behaviors such as cocaine addiction and trichotillomania. Some case studies and some small studies of NAC have shown a decrease in picking by treatment with NAC compared with placebo.

Excoriation disorder and trichotillomania have been treated with inositol.

Topiramate, an anti-epileptic drug, has been used to treat excoriation disorder; in a small study of individuals with Prader–Willi syndrome, it was found to reduce skin picking.

=== Psychological treatment ===
Treatments include cognitive behavioral therapy, acceptance-enhanced behavior therapy, and acceptance and commitment therapy (ACT).Several studies have shown that habit reversal training associated with awareness training reduces skin-picking behavior in those individuals with excoriation disorder that do not have psychological problems. Habit reversal training includes awareness enhancement and competing response training. For example, in one study the competing response training required participants to make a closed fist for one minute instead of picking or in response to a condition that usually provokes picking behavior. In a recent study of participants (n = 113) diagnosed with ED, less than 50% followed through with an appointment to psychiatry. In an absence of longitudinal data which follows patients with psychiatric referrals as a result of ED, little is known for the reasons patients do not follow through with the referral, or what more is needed to ensure access to care. Overall, less than 25% of participants in this study achieved long term results, highlighting the need for a collaborative team approach to treatment across several disciplines to include PCP, dermatology, psychology, and psychiatry as needed.

=== Developmentally disabled ===
Several different behavioral interventions have been tested to treat excoriation disorder in those with developmental disabilities.

One method is to have individuals wear a form of protective clothing that limits the ability of the patient to pick at their body, e.g., gloves or face mask.

Other behavioral treatments attempt to change behavior by providing different incentives. Under Differential Reinforcement of Other Behavior (DRO), a patient is rewarded if able to abstain from the picking behavior for a certain amount of time. In contrast to DRO, Differential Reinforcement of Incompatible Behavior (DRI) rewards an individual for engaging in an alternative behavior that cannot physically occur at the same time as the problem behavior (e.g. sitting on your hands instead of picking at your skin). Lastly, differential reinforcement of alternative behavior rewards behavior that is not necessarily incompatible with the target behavior but serves the same function as the target behavior (e.g., providing people with a competing behavior to occupy their time instead of skin picking).

All of these techniques have been reported to have some success in small studies, but none has been tested in large enough populations to provide definitive evidence of their effectiveness.

=== Biofeedback ===
Tentative evidence suggests that devices that provide feedback when the activity occurs can be useful.

== Prognosis ==
Typically, individuals with excoriation disorder find that the disorder interferes with daily life. Hindered by shame, embarrassment, and humiliation, they may take measures to hide their disorder by not leaving home, wearing long sleeves and pants even in the heat, or covering visible damage to the skin with cosmetics and/or bandages. The results of this shame and isolation often cause the excoriation disorder to become worse. When untreated, excoriation disorder can last anywhere from 5 to 21 years. However, many doctors consider this disorder to be a permanent diagnosis. Excoriation has been documented as showing active from an onset in childhood and remaining active through adulthood.

== Epidemiology ==
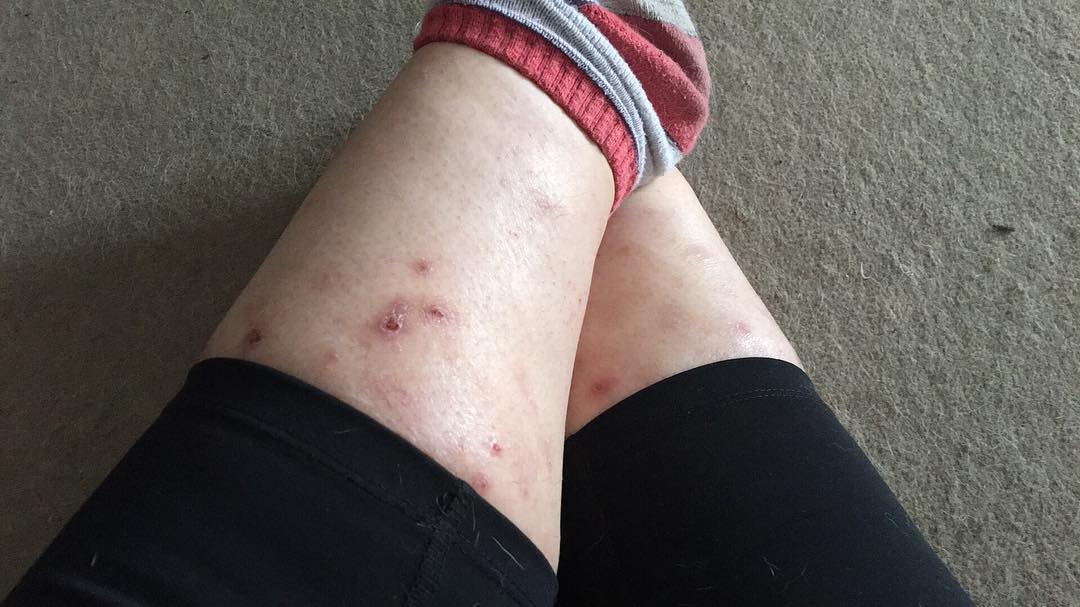
The skin begins to heal after a skin-picking episode caused by excoriation disorder.

The prevalence of excoriation disorder is not well understood.

Estimates of the prevalence of the condition range from 1.4 to 5.4% in the general population. One U.S. telephone survey found that 16.6% of respondents "picked their skin to the point of noticeable tissue damage" and that 1.4% would qualify as meeting the requirements of excoriation disorder. Another community survey found a rate of 5.4% had excoriation disorder. A survey of college students found a rate of 4%. One study found that among non-disabled adults, 63% of individuals engaged in some form of skin picking and 5.4% engaged in serious skin picking. Lastly, a survey of dermatology patients found that 2% had excoriation disorder.

In some patients, excoriation disorder begins with the onset of acne in adolescence, but the compulsion continues even after the acne has gone away. Skin conditions such as keratosis pilaris, psoriasis, and eczema can also provoke the behavior. In patients with acne, the grooming of the skin is disproportionate to the severity of the acne. Certain stressful events including marital conflicts, deaths of friends or family, and unwanted pregnancies have been linked to the onset of the condition. If excoriation disorder does not occur during adolescence, another common age of onset is between the ages of 30 and 45. Additionally, many cases of excoriation disorder have been documented to begin in children under the age of 10. One small survey of patients with excoriation disorder found that 47.5% of them had an early onset of excoriation disorder that began before age 10. Traumatic childhood events may initiate the behavior.

Excoriation disorder is statistically more common in females than in males.

Excoriation disorder has a high rate of comorbidity with other psychiatric conditions, especially with mood and anxiety disorders. One survey of patients with excoriation disorder found that 56.7% also had a DSM-IV Axis-I disorder and 38% had substance use problems. Studies have shown the following rates of psychiatric conditions found in patients with excoriation disorder: trichotillomania (38.3%), substance use disorder (38%), major depressive disorder (approximately 31.7% to 58.1%), anxiety disorders (approximately 23% to 56%), obsessive –compulsive disorder (approximately 16.7% to 68%), and body dysmorphic disorder (approximately 26.8% to 44.9%). There are also higher rates of excoriation disorder in patients in psychiatric facilities; a study of adolescent psychiatric inpatients found that excoriation disorder was present in 11.8% of patients. It is also present at high rates with some other conditions: 44.9% of patients with body dysmorphic disorder also have excoriation disorder, 8.9% of patients with OCD have excoriation disorder, and 8.3% of patients with trichotillomania have excoriation disorder.

Skin picking is also common in those with certain developmental disabilities, for example, Prader–Willi syndrome and Smith–Magenis syndrome. Studies have shown that 85% of people with Prader–Willi syndrome also engage in skin-picking. Children with developmental disabilities are also at an increased risk for excoriation disorder.

Excoriation disorder also correlates with "social, occupational, and academic impairments, increased medical and mental health concerns (including anxiety, depression, obsessive–compulsive disorder) ... and financial burden". Excoriation disorder also has a high degree of comorbidity with occupational and marital difficulties.

Substance use is often present, and individuals with excoriation disorder are twice as likely to have first-degree relatives who have substance use disorders than those without the condition.

Some cases of body-focused repetitive behaviors found in identical twins also suggest a hereditary factor.

In a 2020 Study of Excoriation to identify the variable's such as: demographics, SES, marital status, and gender, more than 75% of participants were identified as female, more than 45% of all participants were unemployed, and more than 60% had marital status which ranged from being single to divorced or widowed. With more females accounting for diagnosis than any other group, future research should look to uncover reasons why women are more impacted by excoriation, and if excoriation has a correlation with marital status or happiness in life.

== History ==
In 1875, English dermatologist Erasmus Wilson introduced the term "neurotic excoriation" to describe compulsive skin-picking behaviors. The first known mention of excoriation disorder in print can be found in 1898 by the French dermatologist Louis-Anne-Jean Brocq, describing an adolescent female patient who had uncontrolled picking of acne. Although the condition was first identified in the 19th century, it remains poorly understood. Much of the existing knowledge about the disorder comes from online surveys rather than in-person clinical evaluations.

== Society and culture ==
Excoriation disorder has been the subject of several episodes of Obsessed, a television documentary series that focuses on the treatment of anxiety disorders.

Excoriation disorder is shown as a symptom of Nina Sayers' anxiety and OCD in the movie Black Swan.

During the 2021 Miss America competition, Miss Alaska 2021 Emma Broyles highlighted her vulnerability and openness on social media about having attention deficit hyperactivity disorder and dermatillomania, as well as her history with volunteering for the Special Olympics. She was crowned Miss America 2022.

== See also ==
- Dermatophagia
- Morgellons
- Trichotillomania, a similar compulsive behaviour, characterized by pulling out hair or eyelashes
- Impulse-control disorder
- Body-focused repetitive behavior
