= Obsessed (TV series) =

Documentary series

- Genre: Television documentary/Reality
- Country of origin: United States
- Original language: English
- No. of seasons: 2
- No. of episodes: 17

Production
- Executive producers: Troy Searer (Tijuana Entertainment); John Foy (Tijuana Entertainment); Rob LePlante (Tijuana Entertainment); Robert Sharenow (A&E Entertainment); Scott Lonker (A&E Entertainment)
- Camera setup: Multi-camera
- Running time: 43 minutes
- Production company: Tijuana Entertainment

Original release
- Network: A&E Network
- Release: May 29, 2009 – 2010

Obsessed is an American documentary series that began airing on the A&E Network on May 29, 2009. The series depicts the real-life struggle and treatment of people with anxiety disorders, including obsessive-compulsive disorder, panic disorder, social anxiety disorder, and general anxiety disorder.

Robert Sharenow of A&E had said about the show, "The series sheds a light on the vast world of anxiety disorders, while offering those who suffer from these debilitating afflictions a path to recovery..."

== Critical reaction ==
Variety's online review of the show is mixed. It refers to the first half of the show as "providing a kind of voyeuristic carnival element" but later on in the review states that the producers make the show "mostly about the pain and loneliness of such disorders; it's not strictly a freak show".

Website PopMatters' review of the show concludes with saying the show "falls short" which "has to do both with the complexity of these conditions and its own limited, conventional means of conveying subjective states. "

== Format ==
The first portion of each episode is dedicated to showing how each subject is affected by their disorder. The second portion of each episode shows the subjects undergoing cognitive behavioral therapy to treat their disorder.

== Episode list ==
=== Season 1 ===
#	Subjects	OCD Topics	Original release date
1	"Helen / Scott"	Panic, Mysophobia	May 25, 2009
Helen has a fear of driving on interstate highways. Her father's death while on an interstate highway sparked her fear of highways. Late at night she puts on the bloody clothing he was wearing when he died. Scott is a mysophobe and is unable to have a successful relationship. He sleeps on the couch because he would be unable to make his bed "just right" in the mornings. He has no trashcan in his house and walks out to the dumpster every time he wants to throw trash away. Through cognitive behavioral therapy (CBT) Helen and Scott are able to overcome their disorders. Dr. Shana Doronn helps Scott feel less anxious about germs by exposing him to dirt and unpleasant items such as a used tampon. Dr. John Tsilimparis helps Helen by driving her on the interstate highway to her parents' grave site. Eventually Helen is able to drive herself on the interstate highway and later burns her father's bloody clothes.
2	"Nicole / Trina"	Panic	June 1, 2009
Nicole becomes very anxious when her mother's and brother's hands are not a particular way. She also is obsessed with her mother's "K" sound and must correct it with her own "K" sound. These obsessions worsened after her father's death several years ago, and she is now unable to enjoy her family's company due to her OCD. Trina has obsessive fears about harming others violently. These fears are often triggered by exposure to violent news stories and by being around knives or other potential weapons. She has trouble maintaining close relationships due to this fear. Both Trina and Nicole are helped through CBT. Dr. Craig April works with Nicole and her family to overcome her fears by exposing her to her mother's and brother's hands being placed in the positions that make her anxious. Nicole also practices listening to her mother's "K" sounds without being allowed to correct them. After twelve weeks of therapy, she is able to manage her OCD well enough to have a family dinner with her mother and brother. Trina is helped by Dr. Shana Doronn, who has her practice exposing herself to violent stories and situations, showing her that she is not a dangerous person despite her obsessive thoughts. Dr. Doronn allows Trina to fire guns at a shooting range and even put a knife to her throat. In the end, Trina makes enough progress to reunite with some of the friends she has been avoiding because of her fears.
3	"Nidia / Rick"	Mysophobia, Gerascophobia	June 8, 2009
Nidia is a mysophobe and washes her hands several times a day. She has a fear of bowel movements and must immediately take very long showers using enemas and toothbrushes to clean her rectum. She has been hospitalized twice due to internal bleeding due to her cleaning rituals. Her marriage to her husband is rocky and may end in divorce if her ritual behavior is not stopped. Rick is afraid of growing old and ritually visits several gyms before and after work for very short workouts. He has anxiety if he does not have a certain number of workouts per day. He has anxiety about turning his body counterclockwise and has a tendency to add up the numbers on car license plates while driving. Nidia is helped through CBT. Dr. Shana Doronn requested that Nidia have an outdoor picnic with her husband. The picnic consisted of high fiber foods to help Nidia face her fear of having a bowel movement. Dr. Doronn instructed Nidia to gradually not take as long of showers without cleaning herself. Rick made only minimal progress through therapy. Dr. John Tsilimparis described his patient Rick as "just visiting" rather than making commitments to therapy to stop ritual behavior.
4	"Russ / Karen"	Hoarding, Panic	June 15, 2009
Russ is a hoarder. His apartment is packed with antiques and other items that remind him of his father and mother. He is afraid of throwing out items for fear of rejecting his parents. At one point his hoarding got so bad he slept outside of his apartment. Karen fears the dark, earthquakes and death. During the evening hours she exhibits signs of paranoia. She fears looking into the mirror at night. Nine years ago she lost custody of her daughter in the aftermath of her divorce. She wants to gain control of her anxiety so that she can regain custody of her daughter. Ultimately Karen was helped through therapy. Dr. Karen Pickett used CBT by exposing her to her fears. Dr. Pickett urged Karen to look underneath her bed at night. Karen visited an earthquake simulator. Russ was also helped through therapy. Dr. Rebecca Gladding was able to get Russ to gradually throw out items which he valued greatly. Dr. Gladding helped Russ set goals of clearing one room of clutter at a time. After several months, Russ made progress, although not enough to impress his friend. Russ has since joined a book club to make new friends.
5	"Shannon / Todd"	Panic, Trichotillomania	June 22, 2009
Shannon has panic attacks. She is overtly concerned with any pollutants in the environment and in the foods she consumes. She fears driving on freeways. She has a young son with autism and wants to be a better mother to him. She had a miscarriage seven years earlier. She keeps the remnants of her miscarriage in her freezer, but she has never examined them. Todd obsessively pulls his hair out and has been doing so since childhood. He obsessively scribbles messages on his home's walls with markers. He is concerned about getting rid of his obsessive disorders in order to be a better father to his daughter. His marriage is very rocky. His wife is concerned that if he does not get better, their marriage will end. Dr. Craig April is unable to help Todd. Dr. April attempted to use cognitive behavior therapy and exposure therapy. Todd missed therapy sessions and never seemed to take his treatment seriously. Todd ultimately left his last therapy session in a very angry mood. Dr. April commented that Todd's symptoms are so severe that he desperately needs the treatment, yet he doesn't have the commitment to follow through. Dr. April suggests that Todd see a psychiatrist. Todd is diagnosed with bipolar disorder and is "more awake" to his problem and continues to seek treatment. Dr. Karen Pickett was able to help Shannon through exposure therapy. Dr. Pickett was able to get Shannon to drive on the freeway. She insisted that Shannon examine the miscarriage remains, something Shannon feared the most. She found that the remains were just tissue and blood. Later on in the episode, Shannon buried the remains in order for her to let go of the past. Ultimately, she was able to overcome many of her anxieties and was able to fulfill her goal of driving her son to a youth ranch for children with autism.
6	"Traci / Judi"	Hoarding, Claustrophobia, Mysophobia	July 6, 2009
Traci struggles with mysophobia. She lives in house with four other people. She doesn't trust her roommates to clean her dishes and kitchen thoroughly. She is also claustrophobic when entering into elevators. She feels her fears were brought about by the death of her father on Christmas Day in 2008. Her boyfriend, Matt, has grown increasingly frustrated with Traci's fears. Traci is afraid Matt will leave her. Judi is a hoarder. She has been collecting things since the early-1980s. Initially she went to garage sales and consequentially bought stuff and sold things. She states that the selling of items stopped after her divorce and turned into hoarding. After her son moved out, it was the first time she began living alone. She feels there was an empty void which she needed to fill with stuff. Judi wants to be able to have her house clean enough to invite her daughter-in-law's parents over for dinner. Dr. Shana Doronn was able to help Judi. The goal was the expose Judi to discarding much of the stuff she collected in order to generate anxiety so that it would be easier to throw away other items in the future. Initially Judi did not want to throw away things. As an example she had great emotional pain when being asked to throw away paper party plates from her son's first birthday. Ultimately she was able to part with the plates. Judi had a garage sale as per of her ongoing therapy. As an agreement with Dr. Doronn, she agreed to give away items to the Goodwill. After three months she was able to have a clean house and have her in-laws over for dinner. Karen Pickett served as Traci's therapist during the episode. Karen exposed Traci to the germs of the port-a-potty. She also exposed Traci to riding in elevators. As part of her final exposure Traci was able to ride a roller coaster.
7	"Christa / Ryan"	Dermatillomania, Mysophobia, Anxiety	July 13, 2009
Christa constantly picks at her skin causing wounds on her face. She is obsessed about potential germs in food. She only consumes certain packaged foods. Christa is concerned about how long her fiancé, Shawn, will continue to support her. Ryan was diagnosed with OCD at age 16. He contends that it might have been brought on by his parents' divorce. Ryan's rituals involve counting such as brushing his teeth with a certain number of strokes, a certain number of times that he puts on his deodorant. He kisses his dog a certain number of times. He locks and checks his front door a certain number of times before departing his house. Sometimes Ryan involves his wife Nora in his rituals such as repeating phrases. Nora is pregnant with the couple's first child. Ryan is concerned that this major change in his life will cause his OCD to become extremely worse. He wants to stop in order to be a good father to his unborn child. Dr. Karen Pickett was able to help Ryan through exposure therapy. She is able get Ryan not to do his rituals, such as not checking the front door after locking it. At the end of the episode Ryan feels more comfortable controlling his OCD. Dr. John Tsilimparis attempted to help Christa with her rituals and fears. Dr. Tsilimparis exposes Christa to eating foods from a restaurant buffet. He also gets Christa to look in the mirror and not pick at her skin. He also takes Christa to a dermatologist, something Christa fears. At the end of the episode Christa had a meal with her family, but was still somewhat concerned with germs. Ultimately she falls back into her rituals and breaks up with her fiancé Shawn.
8	"Marie / Matt"	Panic, Agoraphobia	July 20, 2009
Matt is afraid of going too far from his home. If he is stuck in traffic or goes to unfamiliar areas he has a panic attack. He has lost touch with his friends due to his agoraphobia. He is unable to have a successful romantic relationship due to his fears. He has managed to keep a job as a residential financier where he can work from home. Marie is a 28-year-old single mom involved in a divorce. Her young son died after having a seizure or heart attack. Marie witnessed her son's death. Afterward her OCD became more magnified. Marie is overtly concerned with the weight of appliances in her home. She is afraid the weight will cause her floors to collapse. She wants to be a good mother to her new daughter. Dr. Rebecca Gladding attempts to help Matt. Initially Matt misses several appointments due to claiming to be ill. Dr. Gladding feels that Matt might truly be ill due to his anxiety of exposure treatment. She tries to get Matt to travel further from his home. Matt has let his drivers license expire. He is unwilling to travel as a passenger in his exposure therapy due to having anxiety about not being able to control situations. Dr. Gladding is not comfortable traveling as a passenger with Matt driving due to his expired license. Ultimately a producer and cameraman travel with Matt with Dr. Gladding following close behind. As he is driving out of his "safe zone" Matt gets very anxious and drives back to his house. During this exposure treatment he tells Dr. Gladding that he is done for the day. Ultimately Matt calls the Obsessed producers and tells them he doesn't want to do any more exposure therapy. After filming Matt continues to go through cognitive behavior therapy and continues to make progress in conquering his fears. Dr. Shana Doronn is able to help Marie through exposure therapy. She gets Marie to fill her refrigerator with food. Ultimately she gets Marie to buy a heavy kitchen table. Marie glues down the kitchen tiles as a closure to conquering her fears so that she will be unable to check her floor for cracks due to the weight of her furniture and appliances. Dr. Doronn buys Marie a heavy toy chest for completing therapy.
9	"Mandi / Mora"	Trichotillomania, Panic	July 27, 2009
Mora obsesses about her teeth. She cleans her teeth ritualistically various electric toothbrushes and water picks. She sees several dentists frequently and worries about losing her teeth. She eats soft food because she is afraid hard foods will harm her teeth. She worries that her obsessions will not allow her to be a good mother to her daughter. Mandi began pulling her hair out when she was nine. She pulls her hair before going to sleep at night. She is obsessed with her appearance and wears wigs to hide her baldness. Dr. John Tsilimparis exposes Mora to eating hard foods such as apples, corn on the cob and nachos. He helps Mora reduce her teeth cleaning rituals. By reducing her rituals she is able to spend more time with her family. Dr. Craig April helped Mandi. He is able to make Mandi more aware of why she pull her hair. However during the course of the episode he is unable to make progress on the actual hair pulling. Against Dr. April's wishes Mandi shaves her head. Afterward Mandi continues therapy sessions with Dr. April. At the end of the episode it is reported that Mandi has not pulled out hair in 3 months.
10	"AJ / Vanessa"	Panic, Dermatillomania	August 3, 2009
For almost her entire life, AJ has been obsessed with dogs. She obsesses about dogs being hurt, harmed, mistreated, tortured, or abused in any way. When she was four years old her father abused their family dog in front of her. AJ says that picture is still in her head and that when that image appears in her mind she is more susceptible to panic attacks. During Cognitive Behavioral Therapy, AJ will go to an animal center to confront her obsessive thoughts about animal cruelty. Vanessa began picking out her skin when she was five years old. She believes that there is something under her skin and scratches, pokes, and picks at her skin to relieve her anxiety.
11	"Richie"	Hoarding	August 10, 2009
Richie is an extreme hoarder who has trouble throwing things away.

=== Season 2 ===
#	Subjects	OCD Topics	Original release date
1	"Cindee & Graham"	TBA	??
Cindee is obsessed with exercise and spends many unhealthy hours on the treadmill, at the gym, or with her free weights, leaving little time for her family. Graham fears contamination and washes his hands up to 150 times a day, damaging his relationship with his wife and child. Season 2 introduces CBT therapist Jenifer Garrido, LCSW, owner of Anxiety Treatment Center of Orlando, treating Graham in Episode 1, Sharon in Episode 3, and Robin in Episode 5. Can Cognitive Behavior Therapy help them repair their broken families?
2	"Chad & Nicole"	TBA	??
Chad, a rock musician, is plagued with performing rituals that take up most of his waking hours. He fears that if he doesn't perform his rituals correctly, something terrible will happen to him or his family. Nicole is obsessed with thoughts of her daughter getting kidnapped or dying. Chad and Nicole hope to overcome their overwhelming fears through Cognitive Behavioral Therapy.
3	"Sharon & Patricia"	TBA	??
4	"William & Nanci"	TBA	??
5	"Paul & Robin"	TBA	??
6	"Margaret & Amy"	TBA	??
7	"Al, Tammy, Jodi"	TBA	??
8	"Mark & Sarihn"	TBA	??
9	"Rashawndalyn & Melody"	TBA	??
10	"Phillip & Kerrie"	TBA	??
