= Miss Alaska's Teen =

- Formation: 2005
- Type: Beauty pageant
- Headquarters: Anchorage
- Location: Alaska
- Members: Miss America's Teen
- Official language: English
- Website: Official website

The Miss Alaska's Teen competition is the pageant that selects the representative for Alaska in the Miss America's Teen pageant.

In January 2023, the official name of the pageant was changed from Miss Alaska's Outstanding Teen, to Miss Alaska's Teen, in accordance with the national pageant.

Autumn Braquet of Anchorage was crowned Miss Alaska's Teen on June 4, 2026, at the Wendy Williamson Auditorium at the University of Alaska Anchorage in Anchorage. She competed for the title of Miss America's Teen 2027 on September 5, 2026, at the Kravis Center for the Performing Arts in West Palm Beach, Florida.

== Gallery of previous titleholders ==
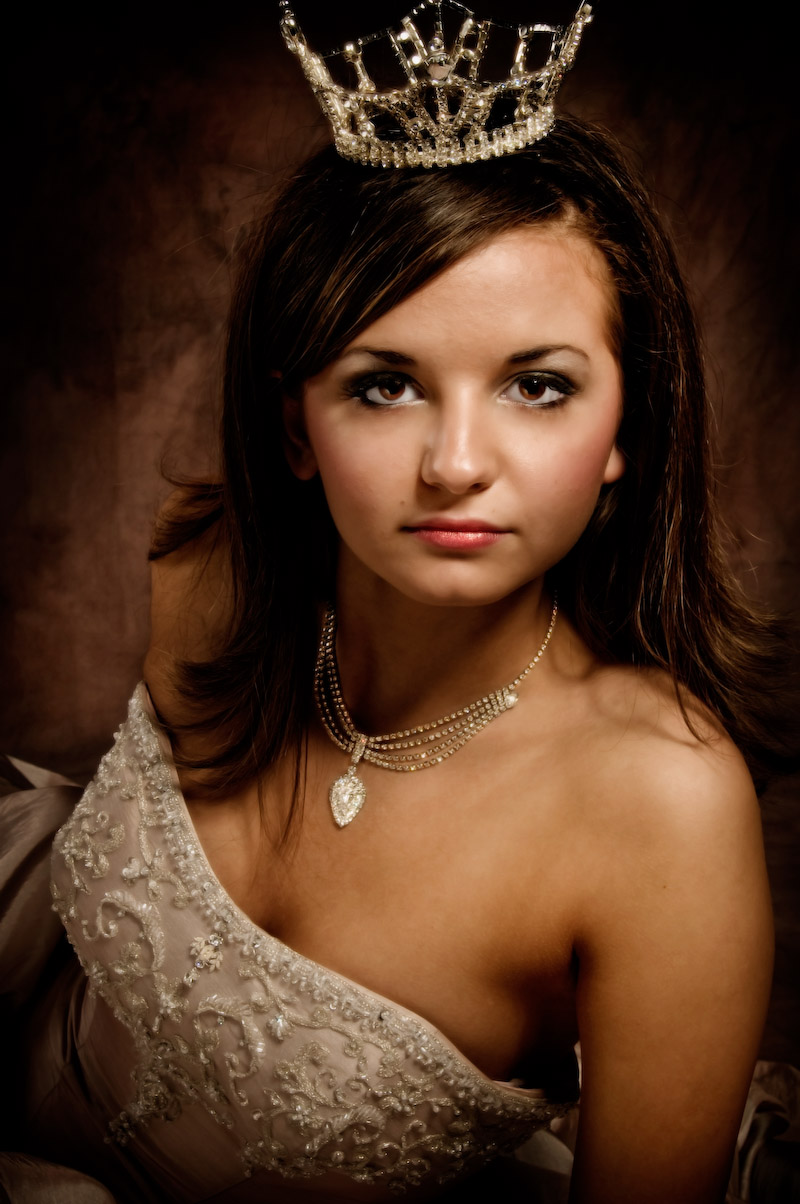
Miss Alaska's Outstanding Teen 2008, Sierra Slade

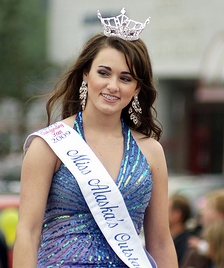
Miss Alaska's Outstanding Teen 2009, Veronica Temple

== Results summary ==
The year in parentheses indicates year of the Miss America's Teen competition in which the placement and/or award was garnered.

=== Placements ===
- 1st runners-up: Sara DeVolld (2026)

=== Awards ===
==== Other awards ====
- Miss Congeniality: Autumn Braquet (2027)
- Teens in Action 2nd runner-up: Sara DeVolld (2026)
- Overall Instrumental Talent Award: Jazzie Trotter (2019)
- Scholastic Excellence Award: Kimberly Carr (2006)

== Winners ==
Year	Name	Hometown	Age	Local Title	Talent	Placement at MAO Teen	Special scholarships at MAO Teen	Notes
2026	Autumn Braquet	Anchorage	16	Miss Alyeska’s Teen	Vocal		Miss Congeniality	
2025	Sara DeVolld	Soldotna	17	Miss Kenai Peninsula's Teen	Ballet en Pointe	1st Runner-Up	Teens in Action 2nd Runner-Up	
2024	Meghan Roth	Anchorage			Contemporary Dance			
2023	Lynciemae Adams	Anchorage	18	At-Large	Interpretive Dance			
2022	Jasmine Frederick	Eagle River	18	Miss Chugiak/Eagle River's Outstanding Teen	Violin			
2021	Sycely Wheeles	Anchorage	15	At-Large	Vocal, “Into the Unknown” from Frozen 2			Previously Miss Alaska Jr. High School America 2017 Later 4th Runner Up at Miss Alaska 2024
2019–20	Corinne Johnson	Anchorage	16	Miss Cook Inlet's Outstanding Teen	Vocal, "Never Enough" from The Greatest Showman			
2018	Jazzie Trotter	Eagle River	13	Miss Chugiak/Eagle River's Outstanding Teen	Piano, "Maple Leaf Rag" by Scott Joplin		Overall Instrumental Talent Award	
2017	Emma Broyles	Anchorage	15	Miss Anchorage's Outstanding Teen	Vocal			Later Distinguished Young Woman of Alaska 2019 Later Miss Alaska 2021 Later Miss America 2022
2016	Danielle Stam	Anchorage	16	Miss Anchorage's Outstanding Teen	Interpretive Flamenco			First Hispanic American to win Miss Alaska's Outstanding Teen. Later, 1st runner-up at Miss Alaska Teen USA 2018 pageant Later, 2nd runner-up at Miss Alaska Teen USA 2019 pageant
2015	Elle Adkins	Eagle River	16	Miss Chugiak/Eagle River Outstanding Teen	Acrobatic Dance			Daughter of Holly Salo Adkins, Miss Alaska 1990 Later, Distinguished Young Woman of Alaska 2017, 1st Runner Up at Miss Alaska 2021 Pageant and Miss Girdwood 2020 Later Miss Alaska 2021 after Emma Broyles won Miss America 2022
2014	Alyssa Hampton	Anchorage	16		Flute Solo, "Take Five" by Paul Desmond			First African American to be crowned Miss Alaska's Outstanding Teen
2013	Autumn Harth	Eagle River	15	Miss Anchorage's Outstanding Teen	Vocal			
2012	Jordan Naylor	Anchorage	14	Miss Forget-Me-Not's Outstanding Teen	Dramatic Monologue from The Wizard of Oz			Later Miss Alaska High School 2015 Contestant at National Sweetheart 2017 pageant Later Miss Alaska USA 2023 Later Miss Alaska 2024
2011	Hannah Rockwell	Eagle River	17	Miss Anchorage's Outstanding Teen	Piano			
2010	Angelina Klapperich	Wasilla	16		Piano			Contestant at National Sweetheart 2013 Later Miss Alaska 2017; Top 15 at Miss America 2018 pageant
2009	Veronica Temple	Eagle River	16	Miss Teen Anchorage	Vocal			One of 13 children Sister of Sarah Temple, Miss Alaska USA 2010 Later Miss Alaska Teen USA 2012
2008	Sierra Slade	Eagle River	15	Miss Teen Birchwood	Dramatic Reading			
2007	Avianna McKee	Anchorage	17		Neo-classical Ballet en Pointe			
2006	Kaela Larson	Willow	15	At-Large	Vocal			Previously America's National Jr. Sweetheart 2005
2005	Kimberly Carr	Wasilla	17	At-Large	Vocal		Scholastic Excellence Award	Previously Alaska's National Junior Teen-Ager 2004
