= Miss Alaska USA =

Beauty pageant competition

- Formation: 1952
- Type: Beauty pageant
- Headquarters: Anchorage
- Location: Alaska
- Members: Miss Universe (1952–1958); Miss USA (1959–present)
- Official language: English
- State Director: Troy Michael Smith
- Website: Official website

Miss Alaska USA, previously known as Miss Alaska Universe, is the beauty pageant that selects the representative for the state of Alaska in the Miss USA pageant, and the name of the title held by its winner. The pageant was directed by Simply Stunning, LLC. from 2015 until 2024, the directorship went vacant shortly after Miss USA 2024 and remained vacant until May 2025 when the Miss USA Organization announced that Crowned Pageantry took over the contest with the new state director being Troy Michael Smith, Mr. Gay World 2023.

Alaska's most successful placement was in 1964, when Susan "Suzy" Marlin placed as the second runner-up. Alaska's most recent placement was in 2017, when Alyssa London placed in the Top 10. Alaska ties with Texas as the states with the most wins in the pageant's history for "Best State Costume".

The current Miss Alaska USA is Holly Huber of Juneau who was crowned on June 28, 2026, at Glenn Massay Theater in The University Of Alaska in Palmer. Huber will represent Alaska at Miss USA 2026.

== Gallery of titleholders ==
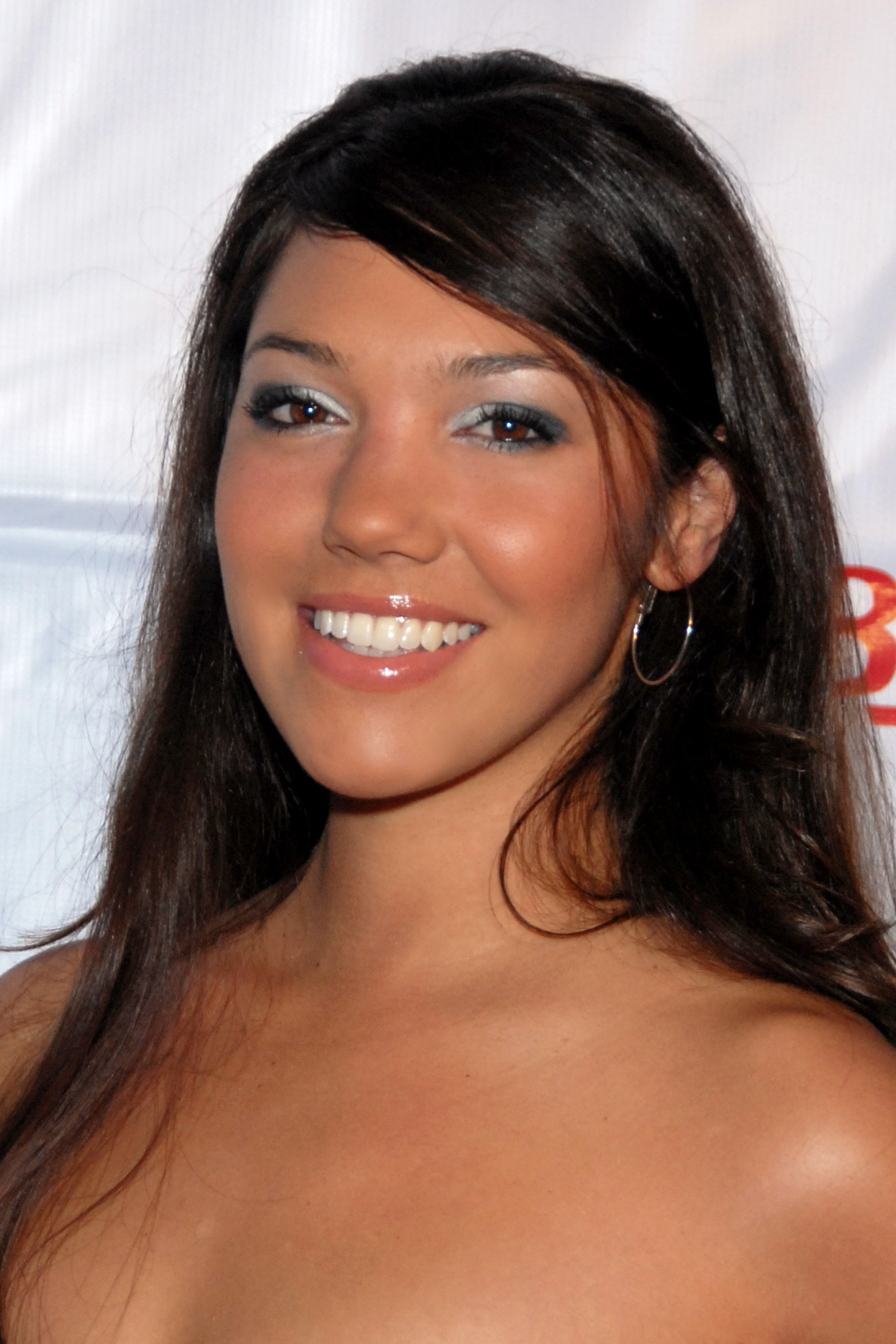
Courtney Carroll, Miss Alaska USA 2008

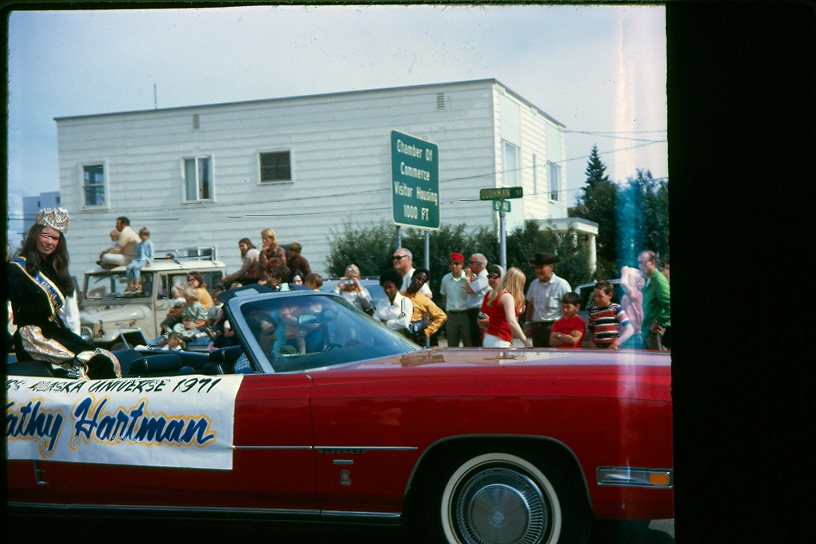
Katherine Hartman, Miss Alaska USA 1971

== Results summary ==
=== Placements in Miss USA ===
- 2nd Runner-Up: Susan "Suzy" Marlin (1964)
- Top 6: Karin Meyer (1990)
- Top 10/12: Patricia Lane (1972), Barbara Samuelson (1978), Alyssa London (2017)

=== Awards ===
- Miss Congeniality: Toni Lynn McFadden (1982), Kimberly Agron (2015), Courtney Schuman (2022), Jordan Naylor (2023)
- Miss Photogenic: Courtney Carroll (2008)
- Best State Costume: Carla Sullivan (1965), Linda Louise Rowley (1969), Katherine "Kathy" Hartman (1971), Patricia "Pat" Lane (1972)

== Winners ==
Color key

- Winner
- Runner-Up
- Semifinalist

Year	Name	Hometown	Age (Note: Age at the time of the Miss USA pageant)	Local title	Placement at Miss USA	Special awards at Miss USA	Notes
2026	Holly Huber	Juneau	26	Miss Glacier Bay			
2025	Kelsey Craft	Anchorage	34	Miss North Star			Previously Miss International U.S. 2017
2024	Brenna Schaake	Fairbanks	29	Miss Fairbanks			
2023	Jordan Naylor	Anchorage	25	Miss Forget-Me-Not		Miss Congeniality	Previously Miss Alaska's Outstanding Teen 2012; Later Miss Alaska 2024
2022	Courtney Schuman	Anchorage	27	Miss Cook Inlet		Miss Congeniality	Previously Miss Alaska 2018
2021	Madison Edwards	Anchorage	24				
2020	Hannah Carlile	Fairbanks	24				
2019	JoEllen Walters	Eagle River	24				
2018	Brooke Johnson	Anchorage	26				
2017	Alyssa London	Anchorage	27		Top 10		First titleholder of Tlingit heritage
2016	Ariane Audett	Anchorage	21				
2015	Kimberly Agron	Anchorage	20			Miss Congeniality	Previously Miss Alaska Teen USA 2013
2014	Kendall Bautista	Eagle River	21				Later Miss Alaska 2016
2013	Melissa McKinney	Anchorage	26				
2012	Jessica Kazmierczak	Salcha	21				
2011	Jessica Chuckran	Anchorage	23				
2010	Sarah Temple	Chugiak	21				Sister of Veronica Temple, Miss Alaska's Outstanding Teen 2009 and Miss Alaska Teen USA 2012
2009	Jessica Nolin	Palmer	22				
2008	Courtney Carroll	Fairbanks	25			Miss Photogenic	
2007	Blair Chenoweth	Anchorage	25				Previously Miss Alaska 2003
2006	Noelle Meyer	Anchorage	25				
2005	Aleah Scheick	Anchorage	22				
2004	Cari Leyva	Anchorage	20				Later Miss Alaska 2007
2003	Stacey Storey	Eagle River	23				Previously Miss Alaska 1995
2002	Christine Olejniczak	Palmer	20				Previously Miss Alaska Teen USA 2000
2001	Ivette Fernandez	Fairbanks	25				
2000	Laurie Ann Miller	Palmer	21				Previously Miss Alaska Teen USA 1997
1999	Anna Ruble	Anchorage	26				
1998	Pamela Kott	Anchorage	27				Daughter of Pete Kott, state representative for District 17, imprisoned for corruption
1997	Rea Bavilla	Unalaska	23				
1996	Janelle Canady	Eagle River	23				
1995	Theresa Lindley	Anchorage					
1994	Dawn Stuvek	Anchorage					
1993	Teresa Gates	Anchorage					
1992	Kelly Quirk	Anchorage					
1991	Tiffany Smith	Tok					
1990	Karin Meyer	Anchorage			Top 6		
1989	Tina Geraci	Eagle River					
1988	Raun Reaves	Anchorage					
1987	Shelly Lynn Dunlevy	Anchorage				Best State Costume – 3nd Place	Third runner-up at Miss Alaska 1986
1986	Kim Christopher-Taylor	Homer	21				Sister of Miss Alaska 1985, Kristina Christopher-Taylor
1985	Kari Moore	Fairbanks	17				
1984	Sherri McNealley	Fort Wainwright	20				
1983	Amy Harms	Fairbanks					
1982	Toni Lynn McFadden	Fairbanks				Miss Congeniality	
1981	Shelly Brunaugh	Fairbanks					
1980	Debby Fickus	Fairbanks					Sister of Linda Kay Fickus, Miss Alaska Teen USA 1983
1979	Kimberly Dawn Fidler	North Pole					
1978	Barbara Bergit Samuelson	Anchorage	22		Top 12		
1977	Edith Baker	North Pole	21				
1976	Liz Staib	Anchorage					
1975	Andie Higgins	Fairbanks	19				
1974	Cynthia Diane Dickerson	Anchorage					
1973	Wendy Curwen		19				
1972	Patricia Ann "Pat" Lane	Fairbanks			Top 12	Best State Costume	
1971	Katherine "Kathy" Hartman	Fairbanks	19			Best State Costume	Born in Montana
1970	Therese Ann Press	Fairbanks	18				
1969	Linda Louise Rowley	Fairbanks				Best State Costume	
1968	Sharon Joy Long	Anchorage	19	Miss Alaska Methodist University			
1967	Maria Louise "Mary Lou" Helfrich	Fairbanks	19	Miss Fairbanks			Born in the Netherlands
1966	Elrita Blakensop	Fairbanks					
1965	Carla Sullivan	Fairbanks	19			Best State Costume	Born in Washington
1964	Patricia Susan "Suzy" Marlin	Fairbanks			2nd runner-up		
1963	Nina Whaley	Fairbanks					
1962	Teresa Dawn Hanson	Fairbanks					
1961	Judy Onstad	Fairbanks	21	Miss Fairbanks			
1960	Evelyn M. Bly	Fairbanks	23	Miss Fairbanks			
1959	Anna Lekanof	St. George	23				Partially of Russian origin
1958	Elenor Moses			Represented the Territory of Alaska at Miss Universe			
1957	Martha Louise Lehmann		18	Represented the Territory of Alaska at Miss Universe			Top 15 at Miss Universe 1957.
1956	Barbara Maria Sellar			Represented the Territory of Alaska at Miss Universe			
1955	Lorna Mae Margaret McLeod			Represented the Territory of Alaska at Miss Universe			McLeod was also registered to participate at Miss World 1955, but withdrew due to lack of sponsorship funds to cover expenses needed to participate.
1954	Charleen Lander			Represented the Territory of Alaska at Miss Universe			
1953	Muriel Hagberg			Represented the Territory of Alaska at Miss Universe			
1952	Shirley Burnett			Represented the Territory of Alaska at Miss Universe			
