= Emma Broyles =

Korean-American model and beauty queen

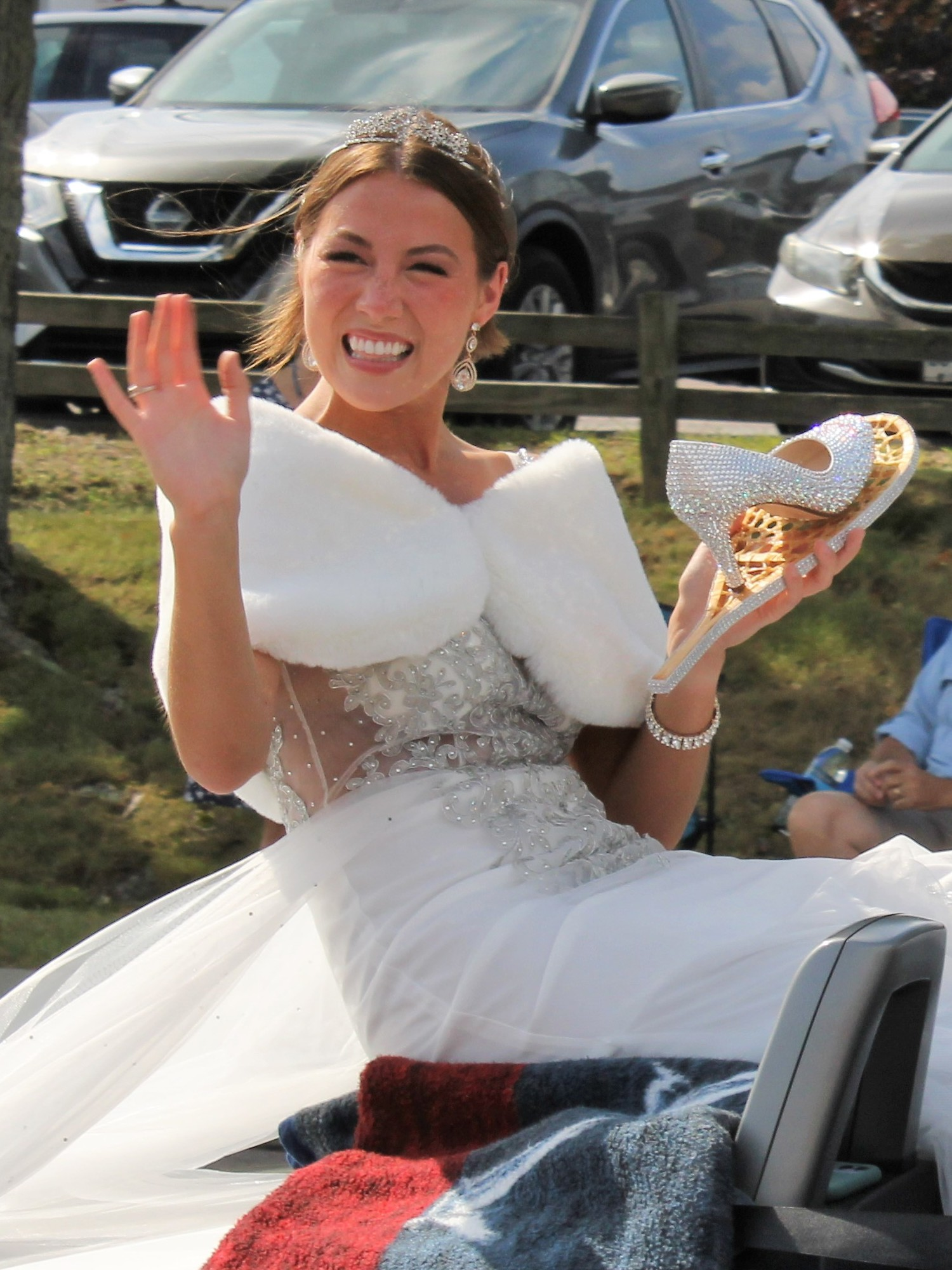
- Born: Emma Leigh Broyles; July 25, 2001 (age 25); Anchorage, Alaska, U.S.
- Education: Arizona State University (BS)
- Known for: First Miss Alaska to win the Miss America title
- Title: Miss Anchorage's Outstanding Teen 2017; Miss Alaska's Outstanding Teen 2017; Distinguished Young Woman of Alaska 2019; Miss Alaska 2021; Miss America 2022
- Term: December 16, 2021 – December 15, 2022
- Predecessor: Camille Schrier
- Successor: Grace Stanke

Emma Leigh Broyles (born July 25, 2001) is an American beauty pageant titleholder who was crowned Miss Alaska 2021 and Miss America 2022 on December 16, 2021, its 100th anniversary. She was the first Miss Alaska to be crowned Miss America, and the first titleholder from outside of the contiguous United States since Angela Perez Baraquio of Hawaii in 2001.

During the Miss America competition, Broyles highlighted her vulnerability and openness on social media about having attention deficit hyperactivity disorder and dermatillomania (the repeated urge or impulse to pick at one's own skin), as well as her history with volunteering for the Special Olympics. Before the competition, she planned to become a physician assistant due to financial concerns over the cost of medical school, though she stated her circumstances changed due to winning the competition's scholarships. She was awarded a record $100,000 in scholarships and succeeded Camille Schrier.

== Early life and education ==
Broyles was born in Anchorage, Alaska to Julie and Ronald Broyles. She has an older brother Brendan and a younger brother Benjamin. Her maternal grandparents immigrated from South Korea to Alaska.

On January 25, 2022, Alaska Governor Mike Dunleavy invited Broyles as an honored guest to Juneau, Alaska for the 2022 State of the State address. Broyles was honored for becoming the first Alaskan to win the title of Miss America in the 100-year history of the competition. On April 7, 2022, Alaska U.S. Senators Lisa Murkowski and Dan Sullivan introduced Senate Resolution 584, "Congratulating Miss Emma Broyles of Alaska for being crowned Miss America 2022."

Broyles graduated from Anchorage's Service High School in 2019, where she was co-president the Special Olympics-sponsored Partners Club due to her personal connection with her older brother with Down syndrome.

In 2024, Broyles graduated from Arizona State University with a Bachelor of Science degree in Biomedical Sciences.She plans to attend medical school and become a dermatologist.

== Pageantry ==
=== Miss Anchorage's Outstanding Teen 2017 ===
In January 2017, Broyles won the title of Miss Anchorage's Outstanding Teen 2017 at the Miss Anchorage 2017 pageant at the age of 15.

=== Miss Alaska's Outstanding Teen 2017 ===
In June 2017, Broyles won the title of Miss Alaska's Outstanding Teen 2017 at the Miss Alaska 2017 pageant at the age of 15.

=== Miss America's Outstanding Teen 2018 ===
Broyles competed for the title of Miss America's Outstanding Teen 2018 in July 2017 at the age of 16. She did not advance to the finals or win any preliminary or non-finalist awards.

=== Distinguished Young Woman of Alaska 2019 ===
Broyles won the title of Distinguished Young Woman of Alaska 2019 at the Distinguished Young Woman competition in November 2018 at the age of 17.

=== Miss Alaska 2021 ===
Broyles was crowned Miss Alaska 2021 on June 17, 2021, winning on her first attempt at the age of 19. She did not hold a local title, but was able to compete as an at-large candidate since Alaska doesn't require candidates to hold a local title to compete at the state level. Broyles won the Talent Phase and People's Choice awards.

=== Miss America 2022 ===
On December 12, 2021, Broyles won a $1,000 scholarship as the social impact pitch winner from the first preliminary night of competition.

On December 16, 2021, Broyles won the Miss America 2022 competition at the age of 20, winning a $100,000 scholarship. The competition was held at the Mohegan Sun Casino and Resort in Uncasville, Connecticut.

== Reign as Miss America 2022 ==
During her Miss America reign, Broyles advocated for the Special Olympics program and Asian-American and Alaskan Native media representation. She also participated in the 2022 Macy's Thanksgiving Parade, flew with the U.S. Air Force Thunderbirds in an F-16 airplane, and was honored as the "Alaskan of the Week" by Senator Dan Sullivan on the floor of the U.S. Senate. During the 2023 Miss America competition, Broyles wore a gown created by Project Runway alum Aaron Michael that featured portraits of former Miss Americas.

Awards and achievements
Preceded by Camille Schrier	Miss America; 2022	Succeeded by Grace Stanke
Preceded by Maile Johnston	Miss Alaska; 2021	Succeeded by Elle Adkins
Preceded by Danielle Stam	Miss Alaska's Outstanding Teen; 2017	Succeeded by Jazzie Trotter
