= Miss America 2022 =

94th edition of the Miss America competition

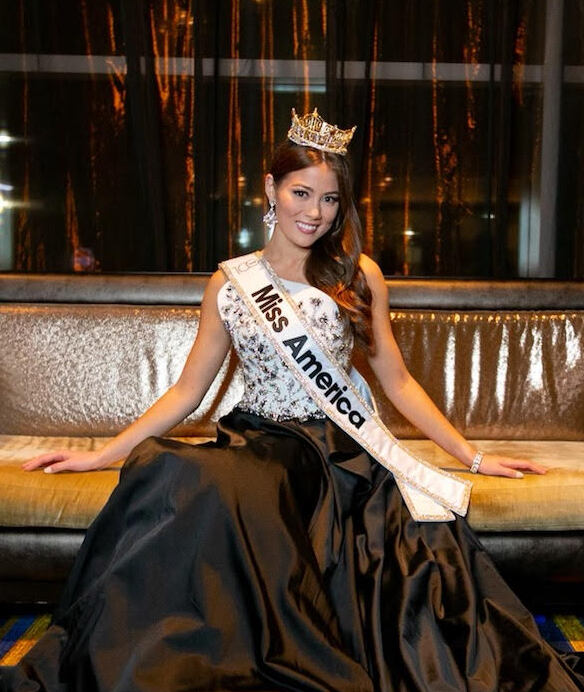
- Emma Broyles
- Date: December 16, 2021
- Presenters: Nina Davuluri; Ericka Dunlap
- Venue: Mohegan Sun, Uncasville, Connecticut
- Broadcaster: Peacock
- Entrants: 50
- Placements: 10
- Withdrawals: Maine (Note: Miss Maine Mariah Larocque had tested positive from COVID-19 prior to the final competition, so she was isolated at the hotel room.)
- Winner: Emma Broyles; Alaska

The Miss America 2022 competition was held on December 16, 2021. This was the 94th Miss America competition and was held at the Mohegan Sun in Uncasville, Connecticut, as the Miss America Organization celebrated its 100th anniversary. It was the first Miss America since 1954 that was not televised, but it was streamed on Peacock. There were several technical glitches within the stream throughout the show, causing many viewers to complain on social media about the production value.

Miss America 2020, Camille Schrier of Virginia crowned her successor, Emma Broyles of Alaska, at the end of the event. Broyles is Alaska's first Miss America title in the history of the pageant and the third Asian American to win the Miss America title, following Angela Perez Baraquio in 2001 and Nina Davuluri in 2014 and the first of Korean descent to win the Miss America title.

== Background ==
On April 8, 2021, the Miss America Organization announced a three-year contract with Mohegan Sun to host the national competition which would be held in December.

On November 22, 2021, it was announced that the competition would be exclusively streamed on Peacock.

=== Impact of the COVID-19 pandemic ===
The COVID-19 pandemic affected the planning of the 2021 event, known as Miss America 2021, which was initially scheduled for December 2020 and was to be hosted at the pageant's headquarters in Atlantic City, New Jersey. That was set to air on NBC but was cancelled on May 8, 2020, due to the onset of the pandemic. The other missing years are because there was no pageant held from 1928 to 1932 or in 1934 because of the Great Depression. Miss America Organization opted to postpone the 94th edition or the 100th anniversary of the pageant to the latter part of 2021.

The state pageant competitions had been planned for April to June 2020. However, they were postponed for a year, rescheduled for April and July 2021 or cancelled outright. The pageant allowed a one-time only grandfather clause on eligibility for state qualifying pageants. The exception was Montana, which held its pageant as planned on July 25, 2020. As with restrictions implemented in all 50 states (including Montana) and District of Columbia, numerous health and safety guidelines have been implemented for contestants, production members, and audiences at state pageants, such as taking a negative COVID-19 test and following social distancing. Additionally, a number of state pageants have had to alter their initial venue choices due to shut-downs implemented by their governors. Some state pageants had to push further a month after they were originally intended to schedule in typical April to June schedule to avoid scheduling conflicts with the Miss USA 2021 state pageants, which were rescheduled into most of 2021 due to the pandemic.

On December 13, 2021, Miss Maine Mariah Larocque tested positive for COVID-19, despite being fully vaccinated, and had to withdraw for the remainder of the competition including the final show. As a result, 50 delegates were still able to participate in the final competition as planned.

== Results ==
=== Placements ===
Placement	Contestant
Miss America 2022	Emma Broyles (Alaska)
1st Runner-Up	Lauren Bradford (Alabama)
2nd Runner-Up	Elizabeth Pierre (Massachusetts)
3rd Runner-Up	Sydney Park (New York)
4th Runner-Up	Abigail Hayes (Oregon)
Top 10	Andolyn Medina (District of Columbia); Leah Roddenberry (Florida); Isabelle Hanson (Illinois); Mallory Fuller (Texas); Sasha Sloan (Utah)

== Candidates ==
51 state or district titleholders participated.

- Declared as winner
- Ended as a runner-up
- Ended as a finalist or semi-finalist

State or district	Name	Age (Note: Ages at the time of national competition)	Hometown	Talent	"Social Impact Initiative"	Placement	Special awards	Notes
Alabama	Lauren Bradford	21	Gulf Shores	Violin, "Symphony No. 5, in C minor" by Ludwig van Beethoven	UNPLUG: The Digital Diet Plan	1st runner-up	Jean Bartel Social Impact Initiative Winner South Dakota University STEM Scholarship Top Fundraiser 2nd Place Women in Business Finalist	Previously Miss Alabama's Outstanding Teen 2017 (Note: Appointed the state title after Jessica Baeder crowned Miss America's Outstanding Teen 2018)
Alaska	Emma Broyles	20	Anchorage	Vocal, “Let Me Be Your Star” from TV show Smash	Building Community Through Special Olympics	Miss America 2022	Preliminary Social Impact Pitch Award	Previously Miss Alaska's Outstanding Teen 2017
Arizona	Amber Barto	23	Scottsdale	Contemporary Dance, "Dream Chasers" By Future World Music	Leadership through Service: Awareness, Action, Results			Previously Miss Arizona's Outstanding Teen 2014
Arkansas	Whitney Williams	23	Conway	Baton Twirling, "Conga" by Miami Sound Machine	Heart for the Arts			
California	Jazmin Avalos	24	Garden Grove	Vocal, "Astonishing" from Little Women	Ending Substance Abuse			
Colorado	Maura Spence-Carroll	21	Fort Carson	Vocal “Never Enough” from The Greatest Showman	#EndTheStigma Surrounding Military Mental Healthcare			First active-duty soldier to become Miss Colorado
Connecticut	Sapna Raghavan	22	Ellington	Indian Classical Dance	Overcoming Adversity: Embracing Diversity			Previously Miss Connecticut's Outstanding Teen 2015
Delaware	Sophie Phillips	25	Bear	Piano	Environmental Justice		Equity and Justice Finalist	
District of Columbia	Andolyn Medina	25	Chesapeake, VA	Vocal, "Summertime" By The Paul Smith Quartet	Demand an End: Stop Child Exploitation and Human Trafficking	Top 10	Jean Bartel Military Awareness Scholarship Top Fundraiser 5th Place	Previously Miss Virginia's Outstanding Teen 2012 Previously District of Columbia Sweetheart 2019 Is an officer in the United States Navy
Florida	Leah Roddenberry	22	Bradenton	Dance	Be a LeadHER: Ignite the Spark Within	Top 10	Equity and Justice Finalist Jean Bartel Social Impact Initiative Finalist	Previously Miss Florida's Outstanding Teen 2013 (Note: Appointed the state title after Leah Sykes crowned Miss America's Outstanding Teen 2014) and 2015
Georgia	Karson Pennington	23	Augusta	Tap Dance	ROAR: Reach Out and Read		Equity and Justice Scholarship 1st runner-up	
Hawaii	Courtney Choy	25	Ewa Beach	Hula Auana	Female Empowerment Through Partnership			
Idaho	Ayriss Torres	21	Pocatello	Ballet en Pointe	The Equity Project			Civil Affairs Specialist in the United States Army
Illinois	Isabelle Hanson	25	Glen Ellyn	Violin	The Media Literacy Movement	Top 10	Preliminary Talent Award	Previously Miss Illinois' Outstanding Teen 2013
Indiana	Braxton Hiser	24	Indianapolis	Vocal	Love Thy Neighbor			
Iowa	Grace Lynn Keller	23	Island Lake, IL	Ballet en Pointe	Read to Succeed: Promoting Literacy in Grades K-3			Eligible as a student and recent graduate of the University of Iowa
Kansas	Taylor Clark	21	St. John	Drums	Band Together: Music Education for All			Previously Miss Kansas' Outstanding Teen 2017
Kentucky	Haley Wheeler	23	Clay City	Vocal	A Stitch of Hope: Alzheimer's Awareness			
Louisiana	Julia Claire Williams	22	Monroe	Dance	Find your FREDDY: Fostering Rewarding Engagements with Disabled and Disadvantaged Youth		STEM Scholarship 1st runner-up	Previously Miss Louisiana's Outstanding Teen 2015
Maine	Mariah Larocque	25	Portland	Vocal	A Survivors Purpose: End Child Sexual Abuse	Withdrew prior to the final competition after tested positive from COVID-19	Miss Congeniality	
Maryland	Lydia Sohn	25	Hanover	Cello	Artworks: Promoting Arts Integration in Education and Engagement in Communities			
Massachusetts	Elizabeth Pierre	23	North Cambridge	Dance	We Hear You: Empowering Youth Voices	2nd runner-up		
Michigan	Vivian Zhong	24	Northville	Piano	Golden Warriors of Pediatric Cancer - Fight Like a Kid		STEM Scholarship Winner America's Choice	
Minnesota	Gabrielle (Elle) Louise Mark	25	Red Wing	Vocal, "Things Are Hard on Dreamers" from stage version of Amelie	The Campaign to Change Direction		STEM Finalist	
Mississippi	Holly Brand	21	Meridian	Vocal	Volunteerism: If You See a Need, Take the Lead		Jean Bartel Social Impact Initiative Finalist	Previously Miss Mississippi's Outstanding Teen 2017
Missouri	Callie Cox	21	Mexico	Vocal	People First			
Montana	Jessica Criss	24	Bozeman	Classical Vocal	A Sense of Defense			
Nebraska	Morgan Hope Holen	23	Omaha	Dance, "Climb Ev'ry Mountain" from The Sound of Music	Lead With Your Strengths: The Power of Strengths-based Mentoring		Women in Business Scholarship 1st runner-up	Daughter of Miss Nebraska 1988, Jodi Sue Miller Holen Previously Miss Nebraska's Outstanding Teen 2014 Previously Distinguished Young Woman of Nebraska 2016; Top 10 at Distinguished Young Woman 2016
Nevada	Macie Tuell	24	Gardnerville	Vocal	Memories Matter: Alzheimer's Awareness			
New Hampshire	Ashley Marsh	26	Laconia	Tap Dance	Fit for Life!			
New Jersey	Alyssa Marie Sullivan	25	Cape May Court House	Vocal	Peer Challenge Commit2Character		Jean Bartel Social Impact Initiative Scholarship 2nd runner-up	Previously Miss New Jersey's Outstanding Teen 2013
New Mexico	Sienna Mascareñas	20	Albuquerque	Dance	Girls Get Math: Breaking Gender Stereotypes in STEM			Previously Miss New Mexico's Outstanding Teen 2017
New York	Sydney Park	25	South Bronx	Original Poetic Prose, "Sit Like a Lady"	You Go Girl! Power Through Sports	3rd runner-up	Preliminary Talent Award	
North Carolina	Carli Batson	21	Wilmington	Dance	Carolina Cares		Top Fundraiser 3rd Place	
North Dakota	Reyna Bergstrom	25	Fargo	Vocal	The Influencer Era: Impact Beyond the Screen			
Ohio	Lora Current	20	Rosewood	Jazz Dance, “Holding Out for a Hero” by Bonnie Tyler	ReadOn: Empowering Literacy, Learning, and Leadership			Previously Ohio Fair's Queen 2019
Oklahoma	Ashleigh Robinson	23	Oklahoma City	Vocal, “Ev'ry Night at Seven” from 1951 MGM film Royal Wedding	Inclusion for all Abilities			
Oregon	Abigail Hayes	20	Damascus	Vocal and Piano, "If I Ain't Got You" by Alicia Keys	Generation Youth: Tomorrow's Leaders	4th runner-up		
Pennsylvania	Meghan Sinisi	26	Altoona	Baton Twirling, "River Deep – Mountain High" by Ike & Tina Turner	Autism Awareness and Acceptance		Equity and Justice Finalist Women in Business Scholarship Winner	
Rhode Island	Leigh Payne	21	Barrington	Piano	Supporting Small Business: Empowering Women through Ownership and Entrepreneurship			
South Carolina	Julia Herrin	20	Manning	Piano	#RealNotPerfect		Top Fundraiser 1st Place	
South Dakota	Kaitlin O'Neill	24	Groton	Ballet	Bloom: Healthy Mind, Healthy Body, Healthy You			
Tennessee	Tally Bevis	24	Springfield	Vocal	Vote With a Vision		Forever Miss America Scholarship Top Fundraiser 4th Place Women in Business Scholarship 2nd runner-up	
Texas	Mallory Fuller	23	Fairfield	Fiddle	The Happy Heart Project	Top 10	Preliminary Social Impact Pitch Award	Younger sister of Miss Texas' Outstanding Teen 2010 and Miss Texas 2018, Madison Fuller
Utah	Sasha Sloan	23	North Salt Lake	Vocal, "That's Life" By Frank Sinatra	RISE for Refugees: Refugee Inclusivity, Support, and Education	Top 10	Equity and Justice Scholarship Winner Jean Bartel Social Impact Initiative Scholarship 1st runner-up Women in Business Finalist	
Vermont	Danielle Morse	22	New Haven	Speed Painting	Championing for the UVM Children's Hospital		STEM Finalist	
Virginia	Tatum Sheppard	22	Milan, TN	Vocal, "Don't Forget Me" By Katherine McPhee. From Smash.	Mentoring Matters			Daughter of Miss America 1987 Kellye Cash
Washington	Maddie Louder	23	Seattle	Dance	Feeding Hope: Eating Disorder Awareness			
West Virginia	Jaelyn Wratchford	20	Martinsburg	Original Monologue	Investing in Our Future: The Impact of Youth Empowerment			
Wisconsin	Jennifer Marie Schmidt	25	Mount Pleasant	Jazz Dance, "Hit Me with a Hot Note and Watch Me Bounce" from the Duke Ellington-based revue Sophisticated Ladies	Diabetes, You Have the Control		STEM Scholarship 2nd runner-up	
Wyoming	Mikkayla DeBolt	21	Sheridan	Original Monologue	Kids Unplugged: Encouraging Our Youth to Explore Their World Without Technology			
