= DLGAP3 =

Protein-coding gene found in humans

Identifiers
- Aliases: DLGAP3, DAP3, SAPAP3, discs large homolog associated protein 3, DLG associated protein 3, SPAPA3
- External IDs: OMIM: 611413; MGI: 3039563; GeneCards: DLGAP3

Gene location (Human)
| Chr. | Chromosome 1 (human) |
| Band | 1p34.3 | Start | 34,865,436 bp |
| Band | 1p34.3 | End | 34,929,650 bp |

Gene location (Mouse)
| Chr. | Chromosome 4 (mouse) |
| Band | 4 D2.2|4 61.33 cM | Start | 127,062,997 bp |
| Band | 4 D2.2|4 61.33 cM | End | 127,130,815 bp |
RNA expression pattern
| Bgee | Human / Mouse (ortholog); Top expressed in: right frontal lobe; cingulate gyrus; anterior cingulate cortex; nucleus accumbens; prefrontal cortex; putamen; Brodmann area 9; amygdala; caudate nucleus; right hemisphere of cerebellum / Top expressed in: superior frontal gyrus; primary visual cortex; dentate gyrus of hippocampal formation granule cell; hippocampus proper; prefrontal cortex; nucleus accumbens; cerebellar cortex; nucleus of stria terminalis; temporal lobe; neural layer of retina; More reference expression data |
| BioGPS | n/a |
Gene ontology
| Molecular function | amyloid-beta binding; protein binding; protein domain specific binding |
| Cellular component | cell junction; postsynaptic membrane; postsynaptic density; membrane; plasma membrane; synapse; neuromuscular junction; glutamatergic synapse; cholinergic synapse; postsynaptic specialization |
| Biological process | signaling; modification of synaptic structure |
Sources:Amigo / QuickGO
Orthologs
| Databases | NCBI: entry; OMA: entry |
| Species | Human | Mouse |
| Entrez | 58512 | 242667 |
| Ensembl | ENSG00000116544 | ENSMUSG00000042388 |
| UniProt | O95886 | Q6PFD5 |
| RefSeq (mRNA) | NM_001080418 | NM_001302081; NM_198618 |
| RefSeq (protein) | NP_001073887 | NP_001289010; NP_941020 |
| Location (UCSC) | Chr 1: 34.87 – 34.93 Mb | Chr 4: 127.06 – 127.13 Mb |
| PubMed search |
- Wikidata
| View/Edit Human | View/Edit Mouse |

Disks large-associated protein 3 (DAP-3) also known as SAP90/PSD-95-associated protein 3 (SAPAP-3) is a protein that in humans is encoded by the DLGAP3 gene.

== Clinical significance ==
Mutations in DLGAP3 have been associated with trichotillomania.
