= Miss Alaska =

Beauty pageant competition

- Type: Beauty pageant
- Headquarters: Anchorage
- Location: Alaska
- Members: Miss America
- Official language: English
- Website: Official website

The Miss Alaska competition is a scholarship pageant that selects the representative for the state of Alaska in the Miss America pageant. Unlike most state-level pageants in the Miss America system, Alaska allows any eligible woman to enter the Miss Alaska pageant without first having to win a local qualifying pageant. Emma Broyles was crowned Miss America 2022 on December 16, 2021. She is the first woman from Alaska to win the title, and only the third woman from Alaska to place at Miss America.

Nora Andrews of Seward was crowned Miss Alaska on June 4, 2026, at the Wendy Williamson Auditorium at the University of Alaska Anchorage in Anchorage. She competed for the title of Miss America 2027 on September 6, 2026, at the Kravis Center for the Performing Arts in West Palm Beach, Florida.

== Gallery of past titleholders ==
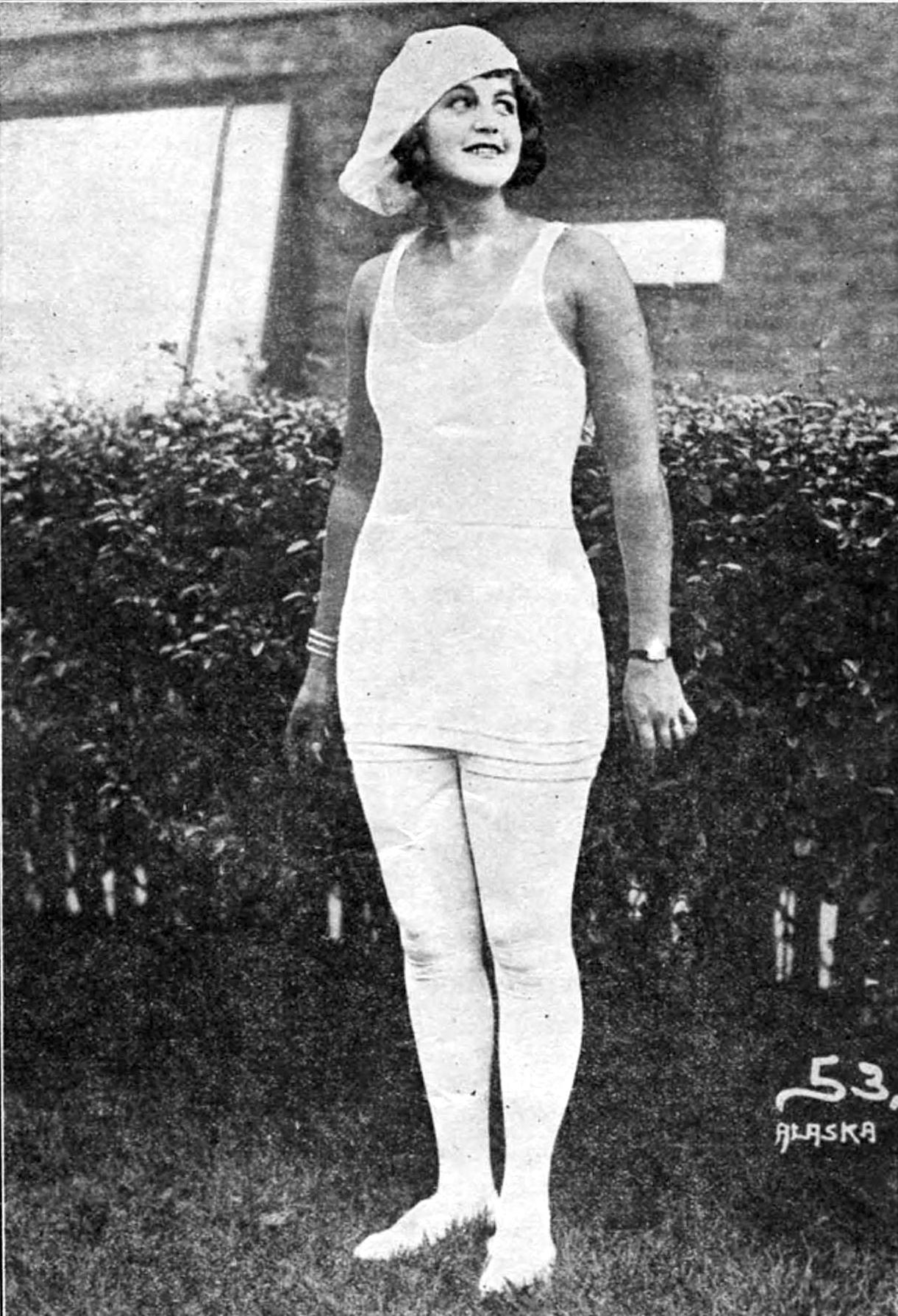
Helmar Liederman, Miss Alaska 1922 and 1923

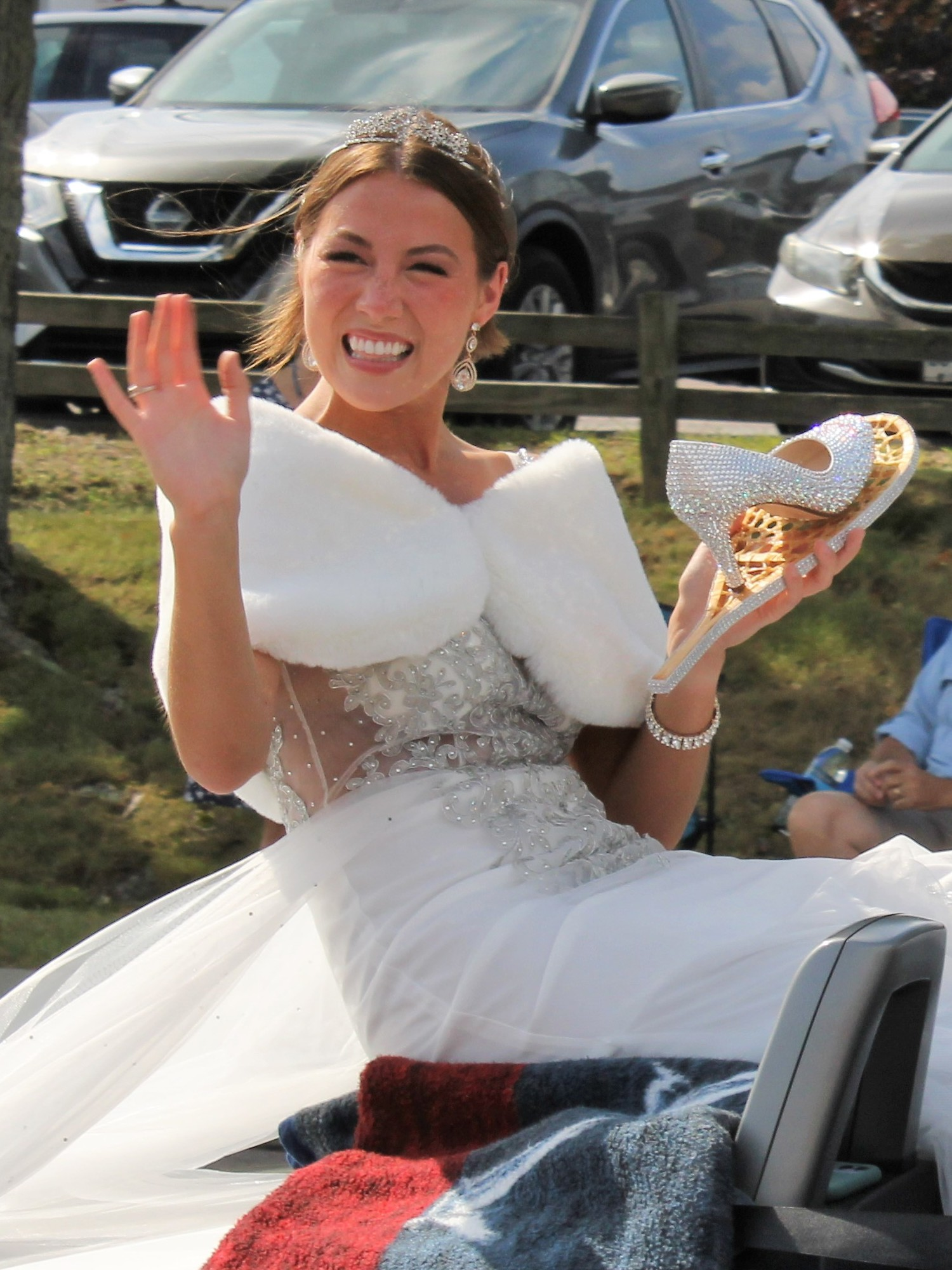
Emma Broyles,
Miss Alaska 2021 and Miss America 2022

== Results summary ==
The following is a visual summary of the past results of Miss Alaska titleholders at the national Miss America pageants/competitions. The year in parentheses indicates the year of the national competition during which a placement and/or award was garnered, not the year attached to the contestant's state title.

=== Placements ===
- Miss America: Emma Broyles (2022)
- Top 10: Joslyn Tinker (1999)
- Top 15: Angelina Klapperich (2018)

=== Awards ===
==== Preliminary awards ====
- Preliminary Lifestyle & Fitness: Joslyn Tinker (1999)
- Preliminary Social Impact Pitch: Emma Broyles (2022)

==== Non-finalist awards ====
- Non-finalist Talent: Karol Hommon (1965), Kathy Tebow (1976), Maryline Blackburn (1985), Rebecca Nyboer (1994), Audrey Solomon (2001)

==== Other awards ====
- Miss Congeniality: Angelina Klapperich (2018)
- Bert Parks Talent Award: Audrey Solomon (2001)
- Charles and Theresa Brown Scholarship: Joslyn Tinker (1999), Eugenia Primis (2002), Stephany Jeffers (2008), Malie Delgado (2015), Emma Broyles (2021)
- Natural White's Smile of Confidence Scholarship: Beth Gustafson (1992)
- Special Judge's Award: Virginia Walker (1971), Linda Smith (1972)
- Women in STEM Finalists: Jessica Reisinger (2023)

== Winners ==
- Declared as winner
- Ended as a runner-up
- Ended as a finalist or semi-finalist

Year	Name	Hometown	Age	Local Title	Miss America Talent	Placement at Miss America	Special scholarships at Miss America	Notes
2026	Nora Andrews	Seward	20	Miss Kenai Fjords	HERStory			
2025	Suparat Prasannet	Anchorage	27	Miss Lake Hood	Piano/Vocal			
2024	Jordan Naylor	Anchorage	26	Miss Cook Inlet	Ballroom Dance, "Little Party Never Killed Nobody (All We Got)"			Previously Miss Alaska's Outstanding Teen 2012 Previously Miss Alaska USA 2023
2023	Hannah Utic	Anchorage	22	Miss Anchorage	Piano/Vocal			
2022	Jessica Reisinger	Anchorage	23	Miss Anchorage	Acrobatic Dance		Women in STEM Finalist	Doctoral Student at the University of Washington
2021	Elle Adkins	Eagle River	22	Miss Girdwood	Acrobatic Dance	Did not compete; originally 1st runner-up, later assumed the title after Broyles won Miss America 2022		
2021	Elle Adkins	Eagle River	22	Miss Girdwood	Acrobatic Dance			Second Runner Up at Miss Alaska 2019 Daughter of Holly Salo Adkins, Miss Alaska 1990 Previously Miss Alaska's Outstanding Teen 2015
2021	Emma Broyles	Anchorage	19		Vocal, "Show Off" from The Drowsy Chaperone	Miss America 2022	Preliminary Social Impact Pitch Charles and Theresa Brown Scholarship	Previously Miss Alaska's Outstanding Teen 2017 Previously Distinguished Young Woman of Alaska 2019.
2019–20 (Note: Titleholder extended to a second full year in 2020 after state and national pageants postponed to 2021 due to the COVID-19 pandemic)	Maile Johnston	Eagle River	19	Miss Anchorage	Dance			
2018	Courtney Schuman	Anchorage	24	-	Original Speech			Later Miss Alaska USA 2022
2017	Angelina Klapperich	Wasilla	23	Miss Anchorage	Piano, "Bumble Boogie"	Top 15	Miss Congeniality	Previously Miss Alaska's Outstanding Teen 2010 Contestant at National Sweetheart 2013 pageant
2016	Kendall Bautista	Eagle River	23	Miss Cook Inlet	Piano, "Tarantelle" by Frédéric Chopin			Previously Miss Alaska USA 2014
2015	Zoey Grenier	Anchorage	19		Vocal, "Shy" from Once Upon a Mattress			Contestant at National Sweetheart 2014 pageant
2014	Malie Delgado	Anchorage	19		Vocal, "Mercy on Me" by Christina Aguilera		Charles & Theresa Brown Scholarship	Contestant on The Price is Right and The X Factor
2013	Michelle Taylor	Anchorage	20		Piano, "Fantaisie-Impromptu" & "Maple Leaf Rag"			
2012	Debbe Ebben	Eagle River	23	Miss Chugiak/Eagle River	Piano, "Requiem for a Dream"			Known for shaving her head for charity 3 months before winning Miss Alaska title
2011	Katy Lovegreen	Anchorage	21	Miss Forget-me-not	Irish Dance			Contestant at National Sweetheart 2010 pageant
2010	Abby Hancock	Anchorage	23	Miss Anchorage	Piano, "Bohemian Rhapsody"			
2009	Sydnee Waggoner	Anchorage	23		Classical Vocal, "Je veux vivre" from Roméo et Juliette			
2008	Stephany Jeffers	Chugiak	23	Miss Birchwood	Vocal		Charles and Theresa Brown Scholarship	
2007	Cari Makanani Villareal Leyva	Anchorage	23		Vocal, "Habanera" from Carmen			Previously Miss Alaska USA 2004
2006	Stephanie Wonchala	Eagle River	21	Miss Chugiak/Eagle River	Piano, "Ballade pour Adeline"			
2005	Rebecca Hayes	Anchorage	24	Miss Anchorage	Ballet en Pointe, "Take Five"			
2004	Christina Reasner	Sterling	22		Vocal, "This Is the Moment"			
2003	Blair Chenoweth	Anchorage	21		Ballet en Pointe, "All That Jazz"			Later Miss Alaska USA 2007
2002	Peggy Willman	Anchorage	23	Miss North Star	Alaskan Native Dance			
2001	Eugenia Primis	Eagle River	20	Miss South Central	Classical Cello, "Allegro Appassionata"		Charles and Theresa Brown Scholarship	
2000	Audrey Solomon	Anchorage	21	Miss University Center	Classical Violin, "Csárdás"		Bert Parks Talent Award Non-finalist Talent Award	
1999	Shannon Kelly	Palmer	21	Miss South Central	Flute, "Carnival of Venice"			
1998	Joslyn Tinker	Soldotna	22	Miss Alyeska	Classical Vocal, "Adele's Laughing Song" from Die Fledermaus	Top 10	Charles and Theresa Brown Scholarship Preliminary Lifestyle & Fitness Award	
1997	Michelle Titus	Fairbanks	19		Vocal, "There Is a Savior"			
1996	Christine Buschur	Eagle River	21	Miss Cook Inlet	Vocal Medley, "Another Op'nin, Another Show" & "I've Got Rhythm"			
1995	Stacey Storey	Eagle River	17	Miss Chugiak/Eagle River	Lyrical Dance, "The Letting Go"			Later Miss Alaska USA 2003
1994	Patricia Marlow	Eagle River	24	Miss Anchorage	Vocal, "If We Were In Love"			
1993	Rebecca Nyboer	Anchorage	22	Miss Alyeska	Classical Piano, "Doctor Gradus Ad Parnassum"		Non-finalist Talent Award	
1992	Keri Baumgardner	Eagle River	25	Miss Anchorage	Vocal, "Come Rain or Come Shine"			
1991	Beth Gustafson	Palmer	20	Miss Denali	Piano, "Rhapsody in Blue"		Natural White's Smile of Confidence Scholarship	
1990	Holly Salo	Kenai	24	Miss Mat-Su Valley	Vocal, "More" from Dick Tracy			Mother of Miss Alaska 2021 and Miss Alaska's Outstanding Teen 2015, Elle Adkins
1989	Christine McCubbins	Kenai	25	Miss Denali	Vocal			
1988	Launa Middaugh	Wasilla	19	Miss South Central	Piano Solo			
1987	Teresa Murton	Anchorage	25	Miss Anchorage	Vocal, "Battle Hymn of the Republic"			
1986	Jerri Morrison	Anchorage	22	Miss Northern Lights	Tap Dance			
1985	Kristina Christopher-Taylor	Palmer	20	Miss Talkeetna	Comedy Monologue			Sister of Miss Alaska USA 1986, Kim Christopher-Taylor
1984	Maryline Blackburn	Anchorage	23	Miss South Central	Vocal, "I Am What I Am"		Non-finalist Talent Award	
1983	Jennifer Smith	Soldotna	19	Miss Soldotna	Vocal, "Le Jazz Hot!" from Victor Victoria			
1982	Kristan Sapp	Wasilla	20	Miss South Central	Sac-Jazz Dance			
1981	Laura Trollan	Juneau	19	Miss Juneau	Ballet / Jazz Dance, "Most Wanted"			
1980	Sandra Lashbrook	Eagle River	21	Miss Chugiak-Eagle River	Guitar & Vocal, "Snowbird"			
1979	Lila Oberg	Palmer	19	Miss Willow Area	Vocal, "For Once in My Life"			
1978	Patty-Jo Gentry	Valdez	22	Miss Fairbanks	Dramatic Monologue, "Marie Antoinette"			
1977	Lisa Granath	Kenai	18	Miss Greater Kenai	Modern Ballet, "A Spoonful of Sugar" & "Every Day's a Holiday"			
1976	Kathy Tebow	Anchorage	19	Miss Anchorage	Violin Solo, "Méditation"		Non-finalist Talent Award	
1975	Cindy Suryan	Kodiak	20	Miss Kodiak	Popular Vocal & Guitar, "For Baby"			
1974	Darby Moore	Kenai	20	Miss Kenai	Ventriloquism, "Supercalifragilisticexpialidocious"			Assumed title when Tomicek resigned
1974	Vicki Tomicek					N/A		Was crowned Miss Alaska 1974 but withdrew for personal reasons
1973	Virginia Adams	Anchorage	21	Miss Anchorage	Classical Vocal, "Adele's Laughing Song"			
1972	Deborah Wood	Anchorage		Miss Anchorage		N/A		Placed 1st runner-up at Miss Alaska and replaced Linda Hogue
1972	Linda Hogue	Kodiak	18	Miss Kodiak	Modern Dance, "Charlie Chaplin Pantomime"		Neat as a Pin Award	
1971	Linda Smith	Anchorage	19	Miss Elmendorf Air Force Base	Dramatic Interpretation, "The Seagull"		Special Judge's Award	
1970	Virginia Walker	Kotzebue	19	Miss Kotzebue/Arctic Circle	Original Poem, "My Wonderland"		Special Judge's Award Neat as a Pin Award	First Miss America contestant from the Arctic Circle
1969	Gwenn Gregg	Anchorage	18	Miss Northern Lights	Art & Poetry Interpretation, "The Wonder of Color"			
1968	Jane Haycraft	Fairbanks	18	Miss Greater Fairbanks Area	Popular Vocal, "Walking Happy"			
1967	Penny Thomasson	Spenard	19	Miss Big Lake	Recitation & Song, "Let's Go to Alaska"			
1966	Nancy Lorell Wellman	Fairbanks	21	Miss Greater Fairbanks Area	Popular Vocal			
1965	Mary Ruth Nidiffer	Anchorage	21	Miss Alaska Methodist University	Popular Vocal, "Typically English"			
1964	Karol Hommon	Anchorage	20		Acrobatic & Modern Jazz Dance		Non-finalist Talent Award	Died in October 1965, after falling from Mount Sugarloaf (Massachusetts)
1963	Colleen Kendall	Anchorage		Miss Alaska State Fair	Popular Vocal			
1962	Mary Dee Fox	Anchorage	18	Miss Greater Anchorage	Original Modern Skit			
1961	Jean Ann Holm	Fairbanks	19	Miss Fairbanks	Monologue combined with Modeling			
1960	June Bowdish	Anchorage	22		Dramatic Monologue from "St. Joan"			
1959	Alansa Carr	Ketchikan	20		Dramatic Reading			
1958	Stuart Johnson	Douglas City	19		Piano, "Alaska's Flag"			First Miss Alaska
1951–1957	No Alaska representative at Miss America pageant							
1950	Maxine Cothern	Fairbanks			Speech, "Alaska"			
1935–1949	No Alaska representative at Miss America pageant							
1934	No national pageant was held							
1933	No Alaska representative at Miss America pageant							
1932	No national pageants were held							
1931	No national pageants were held							
1930	No national pageants were held							
1929	No national pageants were held							
1928	No national pageants were held							
1924–1927	No Alaska representative at Miss America pageant							
1923	Helmar Liederman	New York City	24		N/A	N/A		Disqualified from Miss America 1923 pageant because she was married (despite there being no eligibility rules against this)
1922	Helmar Liederman	New York City	23		N/A			
1921	No Alaska representative at Miss America pageant							
