= Crystal Lee =

American computer scientist

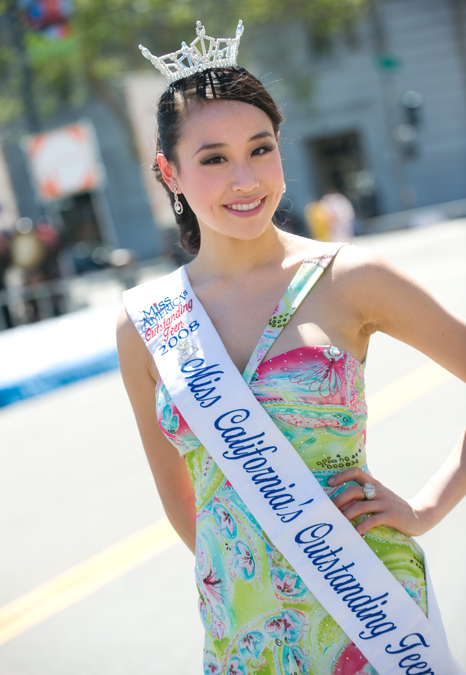
- Miss California's Outstanding Teen 2008
- Born: San Francisco, California, U.S.
- Education: Stanford University (BA, MA)
- Awards: $5,000 STEM Scholarship; Duke of Edinburgh’s Award
- Beauty pageant titleholder
- Title: Miss Teen San Francisco 2008; Miss California's Outstanding Teen 2008; Miss Chinatown USA 2010; Miss San Francisco 2011; Miss South Counties 2012; Miss Silicon Valley 2013; Miss California 2013
- Major competitions: Miss America's Outstanding Teen 2009 (top 10); Miss America 2014 (first runner-up)
- Website: http://crystalalee.com

Crystal Lee (born August 2, 1991) is a co-founder of the Silicon Valley startup LifeSite. Lee was the first runner-up in the Miss America 2014 pageant, Miss California 2013, Miss Chinatown USA 2010 and Miss California's Outstanding Teen 2008. She is currently the in-arena host for the Golden State Warriors.

== Background ==
Lee was born in San Francisco, California to a Chinese-American father and Taiwanese mother. Lee graduated from Ruth Asawa San Francisco School of the Arts. She later received her B.A. in human biology and M.A. in communication from Stanford University in 2013.

== Miss America 2014 ==
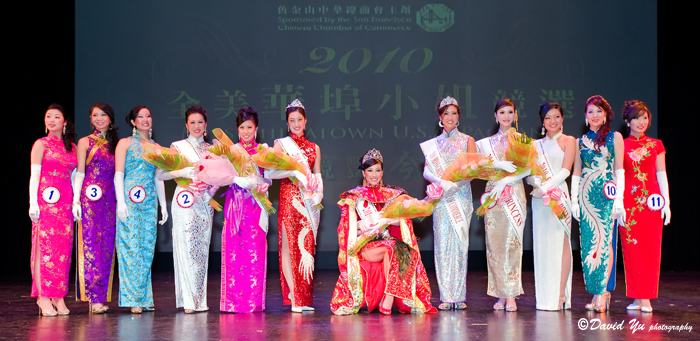
Crystal Lee, Miss Chinatown USA 2010

Lee was first runner-up in the Miss America 2014 pageant where her platform was "Women in STEM." She was also the recipient of the STEM scholarship and the Duke of Edinburgh's Award. In the final moments of the Miss America pageant, Lee and Miss New York Nina Davuluri were the last contestants left on the stage. They were approached by co-host Lara Spencer who asked how they were feeling at that moment. Davuluri stated that she and Lee were "both so proud. We’re making history right here, standing here as Asian-Americans.” In a later interview with NPR's Michel Martin, Davulri described the moment as a, "very surreal, out-of-body experience, being there in the final two. I was holding hands with Miss California, Crystal Lee, and we were both standing there at such a historic moment - two Asian-Americans who were going to take the title and to be a new symbol of hope and encouragement."

When Lee was asked to discuss the final moments in a later interview she stated that she:

was focused on the announcement of results and didn’t think about us being Asian. We’ve had a Chinese-American in the Top 2 before, but perhaps not an Indian-American, which may have been why Nina said something about it. I’ve always thought of myself to be just as American as I am Asian. Our country has always been composed of immigrant backgrounds- whether or not your appearance reflects it. The order in which one’s forefathers arrived doesn’t make their descendants more or less American. But stepping out of the competition, I now realize what a huge step this is for all Asian Americans. I can’t wait for the day we have a Chinese-American Miss America. I hope she’s bilingual, too!

There was a backlash of xenophobic and racist comments in social media against winner Nina Davuluri shortly after she was crowned Miss America 2014 related to the proximity of the event date to the nine-eleven anniversary and to anti-Indian sentiment. News agencies cited tweets that questioned why she was chosen over Miss Kansas, Theresa Vail, misidentified her as Muslim or Arab, and associated her with terrorist groups such as Al-Qaeda. Lee responded to this backlash in an NBC Bay Area phone interview by stating that "people should be ashamed of themselves […] But I think it's also pretty progressive that those ignorant people are being shamed in the media." In another interview, Lee stated: "It’s sad that so many Americans don’t know how much they don’t know. It shows how far we have yet to go as a society. I’m glad the media publicly called out the perpetrators for their ignorance. It reinforces our commitment to acceptance and understanding."

== Publications ==
- Lee, Crystal. "Why Stem Matters." Huffington Post, April 29, 2014.

== Video clips ==
- Vote for Miss California 2013 Crystal Lee - Miss America Organization
- Miss America's runner-up is Miss Silicon Valley, a Stanford grad. Contra Costa Times, September 16, 2013.
- Groundbreaking Miss America Winner Miss New York Takes Home Pageant Crown - ABC News, September 16, 2013

Awards and achievements
Preceded by Leah Cecil	Miss California; 2013	Succeeded by Marina Inserra
Preceded by Jordan Krinke	Miss California's Outstanding Teen; 2008	Succeeded by Monica Stainer
