= Miss Kansas =

Beauty pageant competition

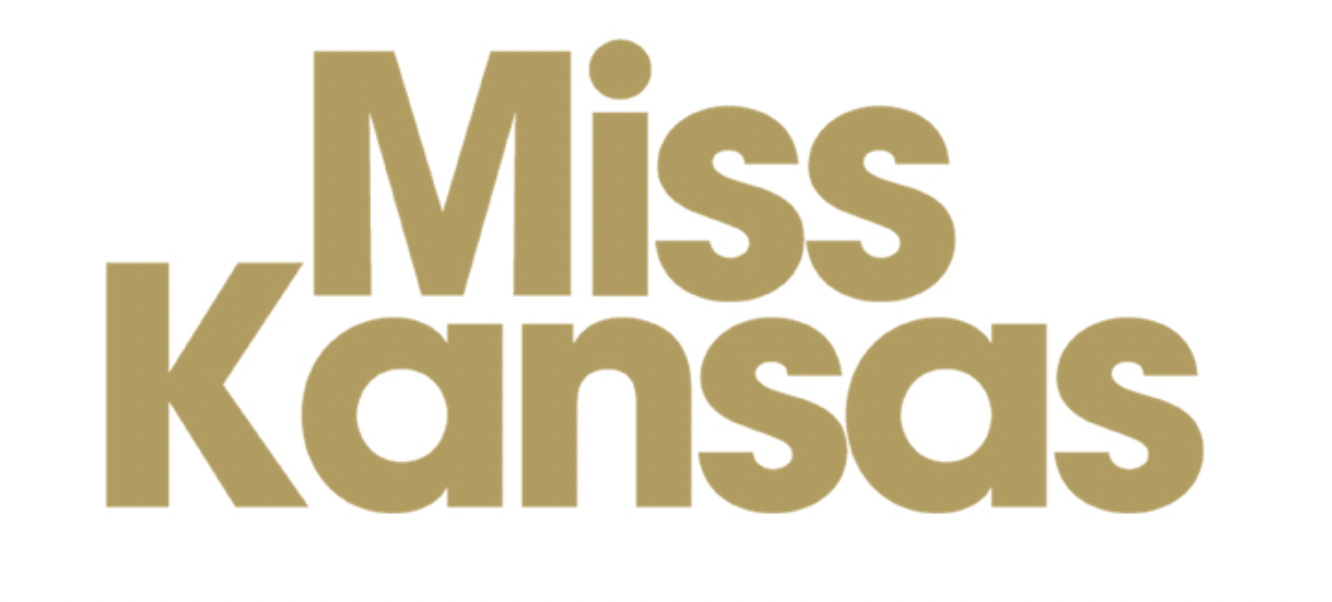
- Formation: 1924
- Type: Beauty pageant
- Headquarters: Pratt
- Location: Kansas
- Members: Miss America
- Official language: English
- Website: Official website

The Miss Kansas competition is the pageant that selects the representative for the US state of Kansas in the Miss America pageant. Kansas has won the Miss America crown on three occasions.

Sophie Lewis of Kansas City was crowned Miss Kansas on June 6, 2026, at the Dennis Lesh Sports Arena at Pratt Community College in Pratt. She competed for the title of Miss America 2027 on September 6, 2026, at the Kravis Center for the Performing Arts in West Palm Beach, Florida.

== Results summary ==
The following is a visual summary of the past results of Miss Kansas titleholders at the national Miss America pageants/competitions. The year in parentheses indicates the year of the national competition during which a placement and/or award was garnered, not the year attached to the contestant's state title.

=== Placements ===
- Miss Americas: Deborah Irene Bryant (1966), Debra Dene Barnes (1968), Tara Dawn Holland (1997)
- 2nd runners-up: Michelle Elaine Whitson (1980)
- 3rd runners-up: Vera June Ralston (1948), Mary Ann McGrew (1957) (tie), Pamela McKelvy (1993)
- Top 10: Sandy Rings (1972), Cynthia Sikes (1973), Lori Ann Bergen (1979), Robbin Lee Wasson (1992), Trisha Schaffer (1995), Amy Keller (1996), Megan Bushell (2005), Theresa Vail (2014)
- Top 11: Courtney Wages (2024)
- Top 15: Shirley Hargiss (1949), Annika Wooton (2020)
- Top 16: Lucia Benton (1937)

=== Awards ===
==== Preliminary awards ====
- Preliminary Lifestyle and Fitness: Vera June Ralston (1948), Deborah Irene Bryant (1966), Debra Dene Barnes (1968), Cynthia Sikes (1973), Karen Dianne Smith (1975), Amy Keller (1996), Tara Dawn Holland (1997)
- Preliminary Talent: Sandy Rings (1972), Lori Ann Bergen (1979), Pamela McKelvy (1993), Trisha Schaffer (1995)

==== Non-finalist awards ====
- Non-finalist Talent: Sharon O'Neal (1960), Karen Raye Schwartz (1964), Karen Diane Smith (1975), Jill Dirks (1978), Laura Lynn Watters (1984), Kimberly Dugger (1991), Angelea Busby (2004), Annika Wooton (2020)

==== Other awards ====
- America's Choice: Theresa Vail (2014), Courntey Wages (2024)
- Children's Miracle Network (CMN) Miracle Maker Award 1st runners-up: Hannah Klaassen (2019)
- CMN Miracle Maker Award 2nd runners-up: Kendall Schoenekase (2017)
- Eleanor "Big Mama" Andrews Performing Arts Award: Kimberlee Grice (2002)
- People's Choice: Courtney Wages (2024)
- Quality of Life Award/Social Impact Initiative Scholarship Award Winners: Annika Wooton (2020)
- Quality of Life Award 1st runners-up: Tara Dawn Holland (1997), Kendall Schoenekase (2017)
- Quality of Life Award Finalists: Megan Bushell (2005), Adrienne Rosel (2006), Krystian Fish (2018)
- STEM Scholarship Award Winners: Kendall Schoenekase (2017)

== Winners ==
- Declared as winner
- Ended as a runner-up
- Ended as a finalist or semi-finalist

Year	Name	Hometown	Age	Local Title	Miss America Talent	Placement at Miss America	Special scholarships at Miss America	Notes
2026	Sophie Lewis	Kansas City	23	Miss Topeka	Vocal			Previously Miss International 2024
2025	Emily Rugg	Wichita	26	Miss Meadowlark	Vocal			
2024	Alexis Smith	Wichita	25	Miss Butler County	Ventriloquism, "The Auctioneer"			
2023	Courtney Wages	Wichita	25	Miss Southern Kansas	Tap Dance	Top 11	People's Choice	
2022	Ayanna Hensley	Dodge City	21	Miss Kiowa County	Dance			
2021	Taylor Clark	St. John	21	Miss Augusta	Drums			Previously Miss Kansas' Outstanding Teen 2017
2019–20 (Note: Titleholder extended to a full year in 2020 after state and national pageants postponed due to the COVID-19 pandemic.)	Annika Wooton	Overland Park	25	Miss Wichita	Speed Painting, "Free To Be" Original Poem while painting a portrait of Supreme Court Justice, Ruth Bader Ginsburg	Top 15	Social Impact Initiative Scholarship Award Non-Finalist Talent Award	Competed for the Miss Kansas title a total of seven times Served two years due to COVID-19 pandemic
2018	Hannah Klaassen	Arkansas City	19	Miss South Central	Tap Dance, "The Greatest Show" from The Greatest Showman		CMN Miracle Maker Award 1st runner-up	
2017	Krystian Fish	Wichita	21	Miss Heart of the Midwest	Vocal, "They Just Keep Moving the Line" from Smash		Quality of Life Award Finalist	
2016	Kendall Schoenekase	Overland Park	22	Miss Johnson County	Vocal, "Ain't No Sunshine"		CMN Miracle Maker Award 2nd runner-up Quality of Life Award 1st runner-up STEM Scholarship Award	4th runner-up at Miss Kansas Teen USA 2011 competition
2015	Hannah Wagner	Wichita	19	Miss Augusta	Ballet en Pointe, Swan Lake			
2014	Amanda Sasek	Moberly, MO	23	Miss Greater Wichita	Vocal, "I Don't Know My Own Strength"			
2013	Theresa Vail	Manhattan	22	Miss Leavenworth County	Vocal, "Nessun Dorma"	Top 10	America's Choice	First Miss America contestant to display tattoos in the swimsuit competition
2012	Sloane Lewis	Norwich	22	Miss Wooded Hills	Self-arranged Piano, "River Storm"			Current Miss New York state pageant executive director
2011	Carissa Kelley	Winfield	24	Miss Wooded Hills	Dance, "Rolling in the Deep"			Previously Miss Kansas Teen USA 2004
2010	Lauren Werhan	Wichita	20	Miss Southwest	Ballet en Pointe, "Asturias"			
2009	Becki Ronen	Buhler	20	Miss Flint Hills	Classical Trumpet, "Stars in a Velvety Sky"			
2008	Emily Deaver	Augusta	19	Miss Augusta	Piano / Vocal, "What Are You Doing the Rest of Your Life?"			
2007	Alyssa George	Minneapolis	21	Miss Sedgwick County	Classical Piano			
2006	Michelle Walthers	Towanda	21	Miss Augusta	Vocal, "Shy" from Once Upon a Mattress			
2005	Adrienne Rosel	Liberal	23	Miss Wichita	Theatrical Vocal / Dance, "America" from West Side Story		Quality of Life Award Finalist	
2004	Megan Bushell	Wichita	22	Miss Wheat Capital	Vocal, "When you Say you Love Me"	Top 10	Quality of Life Award Finalist	
2003	Angelea Busby	Lenexa	21	Miss Cheney Lake	Interpretive Baton Twirling / Dance, Theme from Robin Hood: Prince of Thieves		Non-finalist Talent Award	
2002	Jeanne Anne Schroeder	Hutchinson	24	Miss Chisholm Trail	Classical Vocal, "Time to Say Goodbye"			
2001	Kimberlee Grice	Ulysses	23	Miss Kaw Valley	Vocal, "At Last"		Eleanor "Big Mama" Andrews Performing Arts Award	
2000	Amy Lea Shaw	Derby	22	Miss Arkansas Valley	Classical Piano, "Prelude, Op. 23, No. 5" by Rachmaninoff			
1999	Leah Darby	Derby	21	Miss Derby	Vocal "I Dreamed a Dream" from Les Misérables			
1998	Jennifer Vannatta	Leawood	24	Miss Greater Kansas City	Vocal, "Le Jazz Hot" from Victor/Victoria			Co-director of the Arkansas, Illinois, Kansas, Missouri, Nebraska and Oklahoma state pageants for the Miss USA organization Married to JC Fisher of The Texas Tenors
1997	Lesley Moss	Hoxie	24	Miss Greater Kansas City	Vocal, "You'll Have to Swing It"			
1996	Jennifer Parks	Wichita		Miss Arkansas Valley		Did not compete; originally 3rd runner-up, later assumed title after Holland won Miss America 1997 when the other runners-up declined to take the title		
1996	Tara Dawn Holland	Overland Park	23	Miss Flint Hills	Classical Vocal, "Où Va la Jeune Hindoue" from Lakmé	Winner	Preliminary Swimsuit Award Quality of Life Award 1st runner-up	Previously National Sweetheart 1995 as Miss Florida
1995	Amy Keller	Great Bend	24	Miss Heartland	Classical Vocal, "Quando me'n vo'"	Top 10	Preliminary Swimsuit Award	
1994	Trisha Schaffer	Liberal	22	Miss Southwest	Popular Vocal, "Orange Colored Sky"	Top 10	Preliminary Talent Award	
1993	Lori Minnix	Lawrence	24	Miss KU/Lawrence	Classical Piano "Piano Concerto No. 1 in B Flat Minor" by Tchaikovsky			
1992	Pamela McKelvy	Kansas City	24	Miss Greater Kansas City	Popular Vocal, "I Am Changing"	3rd runner-up	Preliminary Talent Award	
1991	Robbin Lee Wasson	Lenexa	21	Miss Greater Kansas City	Vocal Medley, "How Long Has This Been Going On?" & "It's a Miracle"	Top 10		
1990	Kimberly Dugger	Wichita	22	Miss Wichita	Semi-classical Vocal, "Love Is Where you Find It"		Non-finalist Talent Award	
1989	Jennifer Lyn Hedrick	Derby	22	Miss Fort Scott	Flute, "Carmen Fantasy" by Georges Bizet and François Borne			
1988	Candice Cae Pyle	Dodge City	20	Miss Dodge City	Vocal, "Blue Moon"			
1987	Sherri Lee Mayer	Brewster	26	Miss Harvey County	Dramatic Interpretation, "Clear Glass Marbles" from Talking With...			
1986	Heather Lynn Clark	Benton	23	Miss Wichita	Vocal & Sign Language, "I'll Never Say Goodbye"			
1985	Carolyn Jo Kirgis	Salina	25	Miss Blue Stem	Vocal, "Our Love Is Here to Stay"			Carolyn Jo Kirgis Johnson died in Phillipsburg, Kansas, of complications with multiple sclerosis on July 24, 2022, at age 61.
1984	Nancy Lee Cobb	Wichita	20	Miss Lawrence	Piano / Vocal, "I Love New Orleans Music"			
1983	Laura Lynn Watters	Colby	22	Miss Troia-Thomas County	Trumpet Medley, "Sugar Blues" & "Wood Chopper's Ball"		Non-finalist Talent Award	
1982	Lisa Marie Berwick	Valley Center	21	Miss Wheatland	Vocal, "Battle Hymn of the Republic"			
1981	Dawn Holmstrom	Wichita	20	Miss Wichita	Vocal Medley, "My Man" & "Happy Days Are Here Again"			
1980	K. Leann Folsom	Wichita	21	Miss Center City	Piano / Vocal, "Kiss Me in the Rain"			
1979	Michelle Elaine Whitson	Mission	21	Miss Topeka	Harp, "Never on Sunday"	2nd runner-up		Previously National Sweetheart 1978
1978	Lori Ann Bergen	Salina	20	Miss Salina	Violin, "Csárdás" & "Orange Blossom Special"	Top 10	Preliminary Talent Award	
1977	Jill Dirks	Wichita	22	Miss Wichita	Vocal, "Open Your Heart"		Non-finalist Talent Award	
1976	Linda Hall	Hill City	21	Miss Frontier	Piano, Theme from The Apartment			Wife of former United States Senator Tom Daschle
1975	Jana Salmans	Hanston	20	Miss Dodge City	Vocal, "Follow Me"			
1974	Karen Smith	Shawnee	18	Miss Shawnee	Jazz / Acrobatic Dance, "The Entertainer"		Non-finalist Talent Award Preliminary Swimsuit Award	
1973	Jane Schulte	Hays	21	Miss Fort Hays State College	Vocal Medley, "Happiest Girl in the Whole USA" & "The First Time Ever I Saw Your Face"			
1972	Cynthia Sikes	Coffeyville	18	Miss Wichita	Vocal, "Fame"	Top 10	Preliminary Swimsuit Award	Starred as Dr. Annie Canavero on St. Elsewhere
1971	Sandy Rings	Topeka	20	Miss Topeka	Vocal / Ventriloquism, "Toyland"	Top 10	Preliminary Talent Award	
1970	Linda Susan Edds	Manhattan	21	Miss Manhattan	Popular Vocal, "The Windmills of Your Mind"			
1969	Margo Sue Schroeder	Hillsboro	18	Miss Marion County Fair	Piano, "Sunny"			
1968	Jane Kathryn Bair	Parsons	18	Miss Kansas State College of Pittsburg	Ballet Interpretation, "My Friend the Sea"			
1967	Kandee Kae Klein	Tribune		Miss Garden City		Did not compete; later assumed the title after Barnes won Miss America 1968		
1967	Debra Dene Barnes	Moran	20	Miss Kansas State College of Pittsburg	Piano, "Born Free"	Winner	Preliminary Swimsuit Award	
1966	Betty Louise Fox	Emporia	20	Miss Emporia	Popular Vocal Medley, "A Foggy Day" & "The Girl from Ipanema"			
1965	Mimi Frink	Lawrence		Miss Eudora		Did not compete; later assumed the title after Bryant won Miss America 1966		
1965	Deborah Irene Bryant	Overland Park	19	Miss Overland Park	Dramatic Interpretation, "The Miserable Miserliness of Midas Moneybags"	Winner	Preliminary Swimsuit Award	Previously Miss Kansas World 1963 and Top 7 finalist at Miss USA World 1963.
1964	Catherine Bergstrom	Kansas City	21	Miss Lawrence		N/A		1st runner-up at Miss Kansas 1964 pageant Assumed title after Savage was killed in an auto accident
1964	Sharon Margene Savage	Florence	20	Miss Marion County Fair	Vocal, "Johnny One Note" & "Ritorna Vincitor" from Aida			During her reign she was killed in an auto accident near Peabody, Kansas
1963	Karen Raye Schwartz	Pratt	20	Miss Wichita	Classical Vocal, "Voi la Sapete" from Cavalleria rusticana		Non-finalist Talent Award	Karen Raye Schwartz Angle died at age 76 on May 4, 2020 of lung cancer in Ellicott City, Maryland.
1962	Beverly June Wood	Prairie Village	18	Miss Kansas City	Charleston Dance			
1961	Carolyn Jane Parkinson	Scott City	20	Miss Lawrence	Musical Reading, "Hello Kansas"			
1960	Gayla Leigh Shoemake	El Dorado	19	Miss El Dorado	Original Dramatic Interpretation, "Rude Awakening"			
1959	Sharon O'Neal	Kansas City	18	Miss Kansas City	Dramatic Interpretation		Non-finalist Talent Award	
1958	Sharon Whitacre	Mission	18	Miss Kansas City	Accordion, "3rd Movement of Concerto in A" by Pietro Deiro			
1957	Georgiana Rundle	Axtell	21	Miss Kansas State	Vocal, "Habanera" & "Getting to Know You"			
1956	Mary Ann McGrew	Wellington	19	Miss Lawrence	Dramatic Reading, "Understanding Others"	3rd runner-up (tie)		
1955	Gail White	Arkansas City			Piano			
1954	Phyllis Ruth Danielson	Wichita	22		Vocal			
1953	Joanne Milnar	Hutchinson	23		Water Ballet			
1952	Kay Ann Goforth	McPherson			Vocal / Dance			Kay Ann Goforth Wilhelm died at age 90 on February 2, 2025 in Parker, Colorado.
1951	No Kansas representative at Miss America pageant							
1950	Anabel Baker	Wichita			Dramatic Monologue from Macbeth			
1949	Shirley Hargiss	Topeka			Vocal, "Cecilia On a See-Saw"	Top 15		
1948	Vera June Ralston	Wichita	18	Miss Wichita	Oratory	3rd runner-up	Preliminary Swimsuit Award	Better known as Vera Miles, whose acting career spanned 45 years
1947	Ruth Ellen Richmond	Fort Scott		Miss Pittsburg	Vocal, "Wonderful One"			
1946	Joyce Blakemore	Liberal						
1945	No Kansas representative at Miss America pageant							
1944	Grace Louise Pittman	Wichita						
1943	No Kansas representative at Miss America pageant							
1942	No Kansas representative at Miss America pageant							
1941	No Kansas representative at Miss America pageant							
1940	No Kansas representative at Miss America pageant							
1939	Rosemary Winslow	Salina						
1938	Blanche Webb	Humboldt						
1937	Lucia Benton	Norton				Top 16		
1936	No Kansas representative at Miss America pageant							
1935	No Kansas representative at Miss America pageant							
1934	No national pageant was held							
1933	Pauline Sayre		23					
1932	No national pageants were held							
1931	No national pageants were held							
1930	No national pageants were held							
1929	No national pageants were held							
1928	No national pageants were held							
1927	Mildred Orr			Miss Wichita				No Miss Kansas Competed as Miss Wichita at Miss America pageant
1926	Ruth Richardson			Miss Wichita				No Miss Kansas Competed as Miss Wichita at Miss America pageant
1925	Wildeana Withers			Miss Wichita				No Miss Kansas Competed as Miss Wichita at Miss America pageant
1924	Donna Frye			Miss Wichita				No Miss Kansas Competed as Miss Wichita at Miss America pageant
1923	No Kansas representative at Miss America pageant							
1922	No Kansas representative at Miss America pageant							
1921	No Kansas representative at Miss America pageant							
