= Miss Orlando's Outstanding Teen =

Miss Orlando's Outstanding Teen is part of the Miss America Organization and a preliminary to the Miss Florida's Outstanding Teen and Miss America's Outstanding Teen pageants. Here you will find the history of the titleholders as well how they placed at Miss Florida's Outstanding Teen.

== Florida ==
| Year | Name | Hometown | Age | Placement at MFOTeen | Special scholarships at MFOTeen | Notes |
|---|---|---|---|---|---|---|
| 2019 | Hannah Adams | Jacksonville | 15 | | | |
| 2017 | Olivia Foster | Sanford | 15 | | | Won Miss Orange County's Outstanding Teen at the Miss Orlando Pageant |
| 2011 | Elizabeth Fechtel | Leesburg | 17 | Winner | Preliminary Evening Gown/On-stage question | National Winner of MAOTeen; Older sister of MFLOT 2010, Mary Katherine Fechtel; Was crowned Miss Florida 2014 but then demoted to first runner-up after judging error was discovered |
| 2010 | Mary Katherine Fechtel | Leesburg | 14 | Winner | Overall Interview Winner (MFOTeen) Non-finalist Talent Award & Miss Photogenic Award (MAOTeen) | Non-Finalist Talent & Most Photogenic at MAOTeen; Younger sister of MAOTeen 2011, Elizabeth Fechtel; Won Miss Florida 2015 |
| 2009 | Jerusha Cavazos | Orlando | 16 | 2nd Runner Up | Overall Interview | |
| 2008 | Ashley Paine | Orlando | 16 | | | |
| 2007 | Kaitlyn Chana | Orlando | | | | |
| 2005 | Alexandra Milbrath | Orlando | | Top 10 | | Later became MFOTeen 2007 as Miss City Beautiful |
