= Myrrhanda Jones =

American beauty pageant titleholder

Myrrhanda Lynn Jones
- Born: Gainesville, Florida
- Education: University of Florida
- Beauty pageant titleholder
- Title: Miss Gainesville's Outstanding Teen 2009; Miss Florida's Outstanding Teen 2009; Miss Palm Coast 2013; Miss Florida 2013
- Hair color: Brunette
- Eye color: Brown
- Major competitions: Miss America's Outstanding Teen 2010 (2nd Runner-Up), Miss America 2014 (3rd Runner-Up)

Myrrhanda Jones is an American beauty pageant titleholder from Gainesville, Florida who was named Miss Florida 2013.

== Biography ==
She won the title of Miss Florida on July 13, 2013, when she received her crown from outgoing titleholder Laura McKeeman. Jones' platform is support for “Comfort for Kids, Inc.”, a non-profit organization she founded after her sister died in an ATV accident. Jones is a telecommunications major at the University of Florida. She won the preliminary talent competition for her baton twirling routine in the week prior to the Miss America 2014 pageant, despite suffering a torn ACL and MCL in rehearsal just a few hours prior to her scheduled performance. During Miss America 2014, she performed with a decorated leg brace.

Awards and achievements
| Preceded by Laura McKeeman | Miss Florida; 2013 | Succeeded by Victoria Cowan |
| Preceded by Courtney Sexton | Miss Florida's Outstanding Teen; 2009 | Succeeded by Mary Katherine Fechtel |
