= Deborah Bryant =

American model

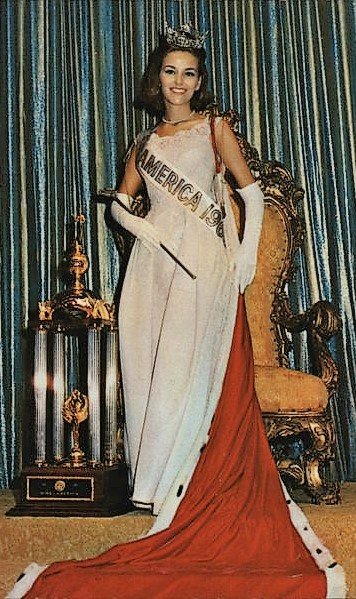
- Postcard of Bryant as Miss America 1966
- Born: Deborah Irene Bryant; January 29, 1946 (age 80)
- Education: University of Miami
- Employer: Lebanon City Schools
- Title: Miss Kansas World 1963; Miss America 1966
- Predecessor: Vonda Kay Van Dyke
- Successor: Jane Jayroe
- Spouses: Roderick Wilson (m. 1967) Brent Berge (m. 1975)
- Children: 5

Deborah Irene Bryant (born January 29, 1946) is an American beauty pageant titleholder from Overland Park, Kansas who was Miss Kansas 1965 and Miss America 1966.

== High school ==
Deborah Bryant attended Shawnee Mission East High School in Overland Park, Kansas, graduating in 1963.

== Pageantry ==
Bryant was 19 years old when she won the preliminary swimsuit competition and, the next day, was announced as the winner of the crown. During her year of service, she spoke in support of "Project Concern" which provided medical support to undeveloped countries. She was the first Miss Kansas to win the Miss America crown. When she won Miss America title, her father was serving in Vietnam as a civil engineer with the Air Force. The 1966 Miss America Pageant was the first pageant to be televised in color.

== Education ==
After graduating in the top ten of her high school graduating class, Bryant went on to attend Columbia College on a full academic scholarship, during which time she represented Kansas in Atlantic City on September 11, 1965, in the Miss America scholarship pageant.

Following her year of service as Miss America, Bryant continued her education as an English major (B.A.) at the University of Kansas, graduating Cum Laude Phi Beta Kappa.

== Philanthropy ==
Bryant remains active in community service for numerous charitable projects. She was a member of the Mesa Desert Club, which provides scholarships to qualified needy high school graduates, and was also a past member of the Phoenix Junior League.

== Personal life ==
Bryant previously married Roderick Wilson in 1967. She gave birth to a daughter in 1972.

Bryant currently resides in Arizona with her husband, Brent Berge whom she married in 1975. Berge has two children from a previous relationship. Together they had two more children and have four grandchildren.

== Recognitions and honors ==
Bryant was named Kansan of the Year in 1965 by the Native Sons and Daughters of Kansas.

Awards and achievements
Preceded by Vonda Kay Van Dyke	Miss America; 1966	Succeeded by Jane Jayroe
Preceded by Sharon Savage	Miss Kansas; 1965	Succeeded by Mimi Frink
