= Mary Katherine Fechtel =

Miss Florida 2015 (born 1995)

- Education: University of Florida
- Beauty pageant titleholder
- Title: Miss Orlando's Outstanding Teen 2010; Miss Florida's Outstanding Teen 2010; Miss University of Florida 2015; Miss Florida 2015
- Major competition: Miss America 2016

Mary Katherine Fechtel is an American titleholder from Leesburg, Florida, who was crowned Miss Florida 2015. She competed for the Miss America 2016 title in September 2015 live on ABC and placed in the top 10.

== Pageant career ==
=== Miss Florida 2015 ===
On February 16, 2015, Fechtel won the Miss University of Florida 2015 title over 20 other contestants for the crown. She was crowned by the Miss University of Florida 2014 titleholder, her older sister Elizabeth Fechtel.

Entering the state pageant of behalf of her university in June 2015 as one of 47 finalists, Fechtel's Miss Florida 2015 pageant competition talent was a lyrical dance to the song "Listen" by Beyoncé. Her platform was human trafficking and online safety in prevention. She adopted various topics for speeches, most notably women empowerment and faith.

Fechtel won the competition on Saturday, June 20, 2015, when she received her crown from outgoing Miss Florida titleholder Victoria Cowen. She earned more than $18,000 in scholarship money and other prizes from the state pageant. As Miss Florida, her activities included public appearances across the state of Florida. She is best known for her dedication to human trafficking awareness and internet exploitation. During her travels she supported state nonprofits, spoke to over 20,000 students in Florida K-12 schools, and trained law enforcement officers and prosecutors in anti-human trafficking efforts. She was a spokesperson for the Everglades Foundation and lobbied for the Florida Legacy Act.

In February 2016 the Florida House of Representatives passed a Personal Resolution Bill in her honor (HB9069) for exceptional dedication to her various platform issues.

=== Vying for Miss America ===
Fechtel was Florida's representative at the Miss America 2016 pageant in Atlantic City, New Jersey, in September 2015. She won a preliminary swimsuit competition, earning a $1,000 "lifestyle and fitness" scholarship award. In the televised finale on September 13, 2015, she danced to "Bridge Over Troubled Water" during the talent portion of the competition. Fechtel placed in the Top 10 finalists and earned a $7,000 scholarship award.

=== Sisterly parallels ===
Mary Katherine's older sister, Elizabeth Fechtel, succeeded her as Miss Orlando's Outstanding Teen 2011 and Miss Florida's Outstanding Teen 2011. (Elizabeth went on to win the Miss America's Outstanding Teen 2012 crown.) She was crowned Miss University of Florida 2014 and was succeeded by Mary Katherine in 2015. Elizabeth was crowned Miss Florida in 2014, just as Mary Katherine would be in 2015, but Elizabeth was demoted to first runner-up after just six days when an error tabulating judges' scores was discovered.

== Personal life and education ==
Fechtel is a native of Leesburg, Florida, and a 2012 graduate of First Academy High School in Leesburg. Her father is Vince Fechtel and her mother is Dixie Fechtel.

Fechtel is an undergraduate student at the University of Florida where she studies family, youth, and community sciences. While a student at Florida, Fechtel became a member of the Kappa Delta sorority. She was elected Vice President of Standards. She represented the University of Florida in athletics as a Florida Dazzler and became a cheerleader uniform model for Varsity Fashions. As a leader in Dance Marathon at UF she worked with children at Shands Hospital and became a public proponent of Children's Miracle Network Hospitals. She withdrew from classes for the duration of her reign to fulfill her duties as Miss Florida but completed her degree in December 2016.

Awards and achievements
Preceded by Victoria Cowen	Miss Florida; 2015	Succeeded by Courtney Sexton
Preceded by Myrrhanda Jones	Miss Florida's Outstanding Teen; 2010	Succeeded by Elizabeth Fechtel
