= Amanda Jaeger =

- Born: March 12, 1991 (age 35)
- Education: University of Central Missouri University of Kansas
- Beauty pageant titleholder
- Title: Miss Kansas 2014
- Major competition: Miss America 2015

Amanda Jaeger (born March 12, 1991) is an American beauty pageant titleholder, news reporter, and TikTok star from Moberly, Missouri, who was crowned Miss Kansas 2014. She competed for the Miss America 2015 title in September 2014.

== Early life and education ==
Jaeger is a native of Moberly, Missouri and the daughter of Jon and Michelle Brooks. She graduated from the University of Central Missouri in 2013. While at UCM, she was named the top female undergraduate and maintained a 4.0 GPA. She then went on to the University of Kansas to pursue a Master of Arts in political science.

== Pageant career ==
=== Miss Missouri ===
A native Missourian, Jaeger competed at Miss Missouri for three years. She held the Missouri titles of Miss Moberly 2010, Miss Midland Empire 2012, and Miss Heartland 2013.

=== Miss Kansas 2015 ===
Jaeger won the title of Miss Greater Wichita in February 2014, which allowed her to compete at the state pageant held in Pratt, Kansas in June. At Miss Kansas, she won two preliminary awards for talent and lifestyle and fitness. She sang "Out Here on My Own" for her talent, from the musical film Fame. Jaeger beat out 30 other women for the title of Miss Kansas and received a $5,000 scholarship. Her personal platform was "SOS (Survivors Overcoming Suicide) – Reaching Out," which was inspired by the suicide of her biological father when she was 17.

=== Miss America 2015 ===
Jaeger competed for Miss America 2015 on September 14, 2014, in Atlantic City, New Jersey. She placed outside the semi-finalists, but was 1 of 10 finalists for the Quality of Life Award.

Awards and achievements
Preceded by Theresa Vail	Miss Kansas; 2014	Succeeded by Hannah Wagner
