= Miss Chinatown USA =

Miss Chinatown U.S.A.
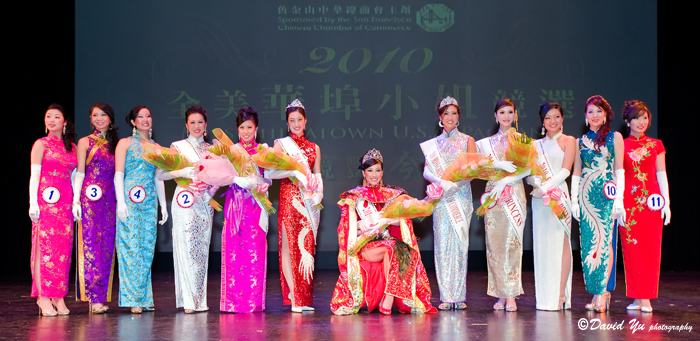
- 2010 contestants. Center, seated is Crystal Lee, winner of Miss Chinatown USA 2010 and Miss California 2013.
- Date: March 6, 2026
- Sponsor: Thunder Valley Casino Resort
- Winner: Janelle Liang (2026)
- 1st Princess / Miss Chinese Chamber of Commerce: Lauren Xu (2026)
- 2nd Princess: Megan Martono (2026)

The Miss Chinatown USA pageant, based on Chinese communities within the U.S., greets delegates around the country. The pageant has been an annual Lunar New Year event since 1958. The winners of this pageant represent the Chinese community and act as ambassadors promoting Chinese culture and heritage.

== History ==
A local beauty pageant had been held by the Chinese American Citizens Alliance (CACA) and the San Francisco Lodge around Independence Day since 1948, with Penny (Lee) Wong as the first winner (CACA). The 1948 pageant was held in Pleasanton. Other winners included Lotus Wong (1948, Chinese Consolidated Benevolent Association or CCBA), Fanny Don (1949, CACA), Lena Jane Chin (1950), Dorothy Lee (1951), and Annie Chow (1952).

Following the conclusion of the Chinese Civil War in 1949, the first official Lunar New Year Parade in San Francisco's Chinatown was held in 1953 to project that community as "patriotic, assimilated [and] compatible with American values". That year Pat Kan, the daughter of noted Chinatown restaurateur Johnny Kan, was chosen as "Miss Firecracker" by non-Chinese descent reporters and posed with "nothing but a string of firecrackers". In 1954, the local beauty pageant was rolled into the parade as a contest to select the Festival Queen and the parade expanded into a multi-day event. Chinese New Year Parade / Festival Queens included Bernice Woong (1954), Carolyn Lim (1955), Estelle Dong (1956), and Ruby Kwong (1957).

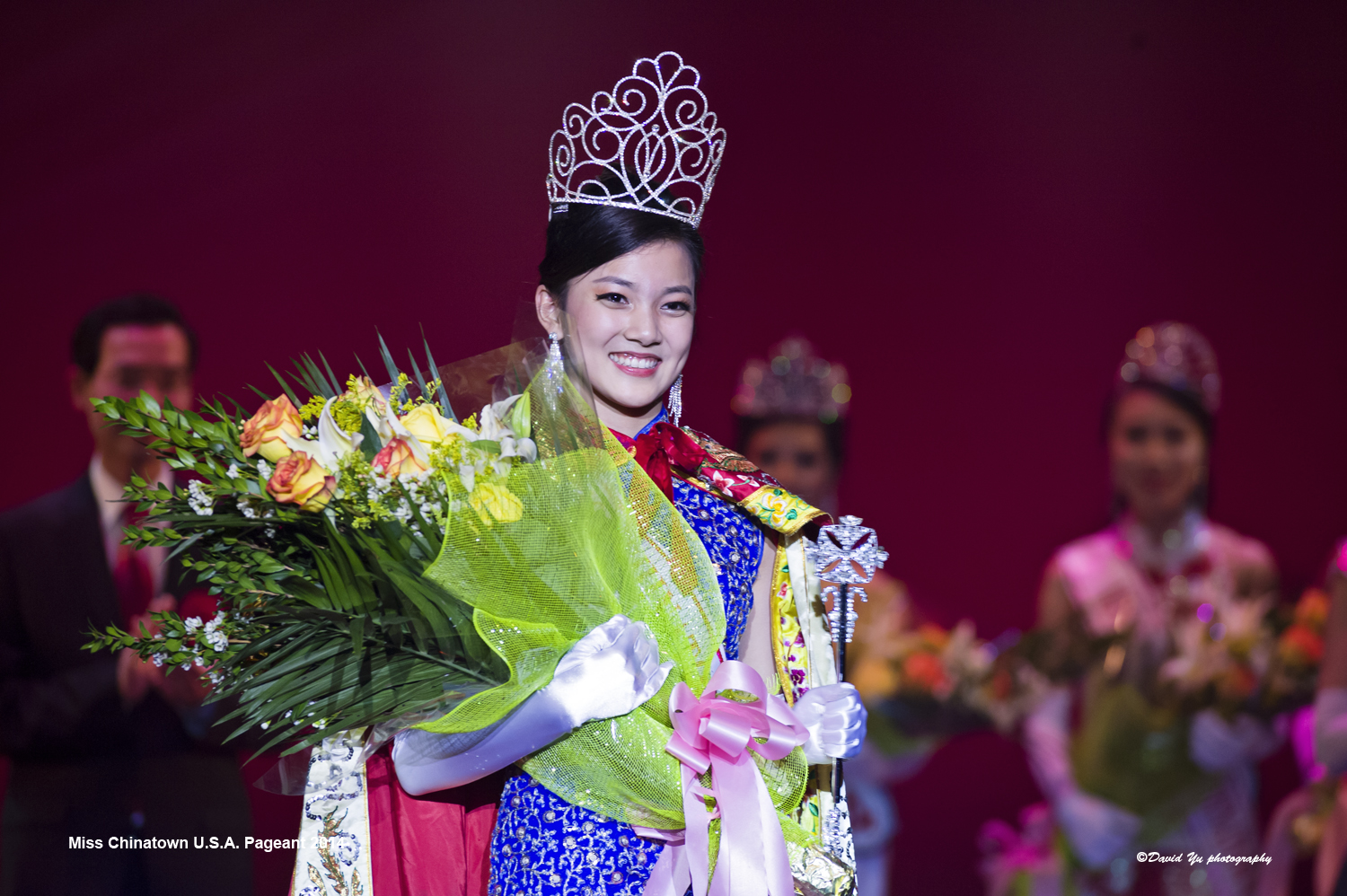
Karen Li, Miss Chinatown U.S.A. 2014

In 1958, the pageant was opened to seventeen competitors from around the United States and the first winner was June Gong, a 21-year old originally from Miami who previously had won the 1957 Miss New York Chinatown pageant and was runner-up for the 1957 Miss New Hampshire title. Gong was a senior majoring in Home Economics at the University of New Hampshire. Judges at the 1958 contest included Chin Yang Lee, Joseph Fields, Richard Pollard, Mrs. K. L. Kwong, Mrs. John Yu, and Sally Lee Thompson; the judges since then have been a mix of prominent people, both of Chinese descent or non-Chinese descent. Throughout the years, proponents of Miss Chinatown claimed that this contest helped young woman overcome class divisions to receive necessary economic support to better themselves.

Kem K. Lee was the first official photographer of the pageant and photographed the event until his death in 1986; he also covered the earlier pageants dating back to 1948. In 1961, the Sahara Hotel in Las Vegas announced plans to hold its own "Miss Chinatown USA" pageant, but changed the name of its contest to "Miss East Bay" after a protest from the San Francisco Chinese Chamber of Commerce (SFCCC). That year, contestants included representatives from Durham, North Carolina, Fresno, California, Los Angeles, Minneapolis, Minnesota, New York City, Phoenix, Arizona, Seattle, Washington, D.C., and Whittier, California.

Today, the Miss Chinatown USA pageant pulls contestants from all around the world as they advance past their city-level pageants. For example, the winner of Miss Chinatown Houston would win a sponsorship to compete in the Miss Chinatown USA pageant.

=== Criticism ===
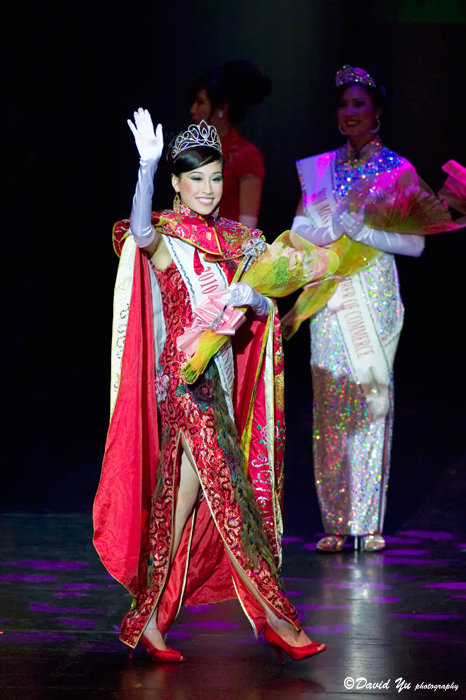
Miss Chinatown USA 2010, Crystal Lee

The signature evening gown is a tightly fitted cheongsam, chosen by the New Year Festival's organizer, H.K. Wong, to exoticize the contestants as "the perfect blend of East and West" and draw tourists to Chinatown. Although the earlier (1948–1953) local beauty pageant featured western dresses, author Chiou-Ling Yeh asserts the new pageant served to reinforce stereotypes: the choice of the cheongsam reinforced sexualized perception of Chinese women through its extra high-cut side slit, and early publicity emphasized the value of traditional, patriarchal ideals for female behavior, referring to the Three Obediences and Four Virtues. The winners were seen as cultural ambassadors to bridge the gap between Chinese-American immigrants and western society; in one instance, a restriction on the use of firecrackers in San Francisco was lifted after San Francisco Mayor George Christopher kissed the reigning Miss Chinatown in 1956.

Additional criticisms of the pageant, including it being not truly representative of the Chinatown population, reinforcing Caucasian beauty standards, and perpetuating the model minority stereotype have arisen since its origins. Pageants affirmed the model minority stereotype by affirming the importance of education as well as how woman were expected to assimilate into society. Contestants also tended to be middle class woman, further pushing the ideal during the Cold War. Additionally, by picking winners of the elite middle class, critics argued that the beauty queens were not representative of the Chinatown population. Furthermore, participants were not even expected to speak Chinese, the only part of them that was distinctly Chinese was their bodies. The Holiday Inn Chinatown sponsored one of the 1971 contestants; as a publicity stunt, she jumped out of a giant fortune cookie for the opening of the hotel, later drawing jeers and eggs when she rode on a float during the Lunar New Year parade.

Performance artist Kristina Wong has crashed numerous events in costume as the character "Fannie Wong, former Miss Chinatown 2nd runner up" since 2002; parodying the stereotype of a quiet, demure Asian woman, Wong describes Fannie as a "cigar chomping, leg humping fast talking beauty queen" that was "often escorted out of venues". Wong grew up in San Francisco idolizing Miss Chinatown, but admits she was "nervous because she did not know how she'd transition from being 'completely sexually repressed and totally awkward' to someone who was beautiful and self-assured. 'I felt like such an embarrassment to my family.'"

=== Pageant rules ===
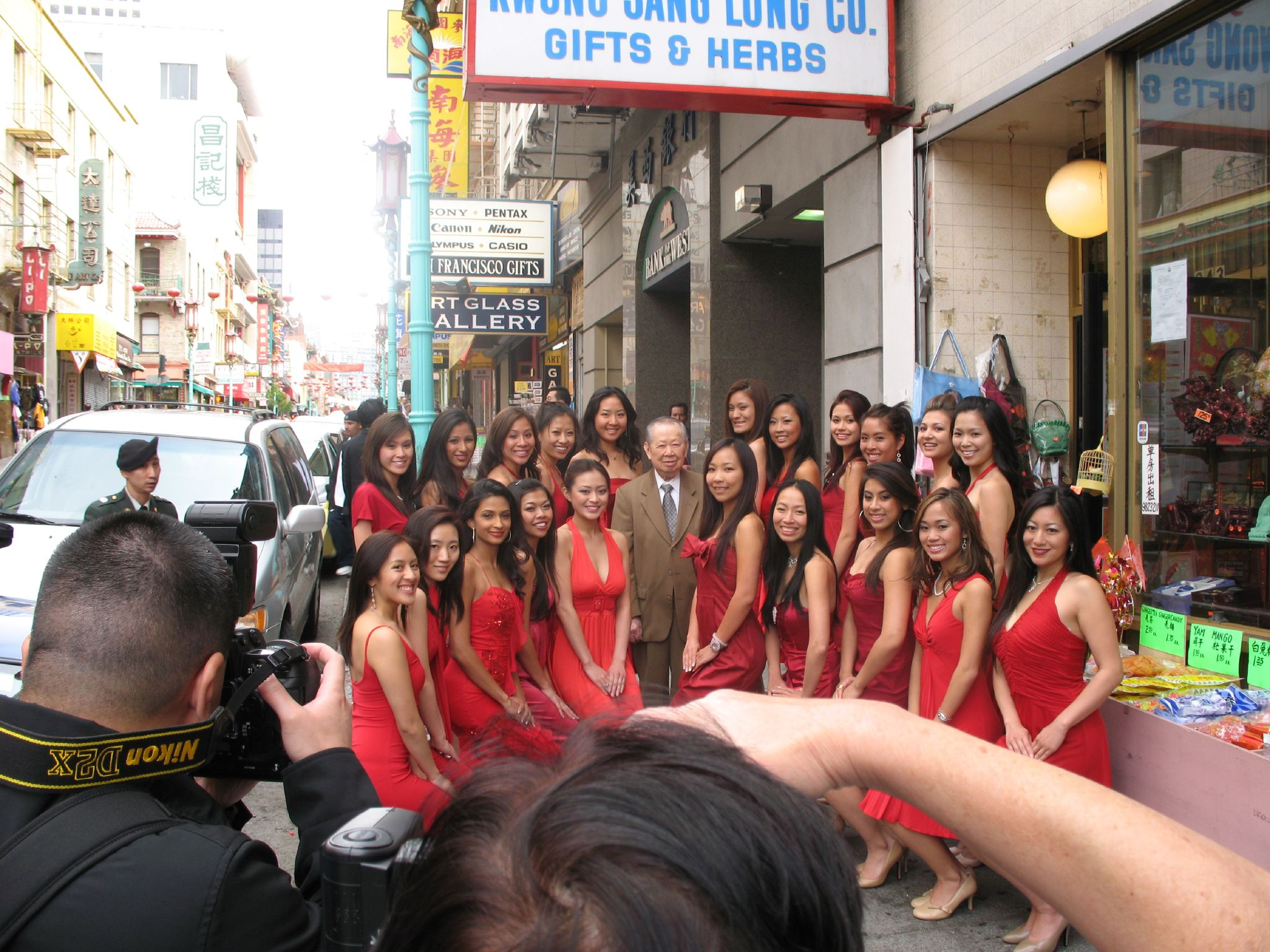
2008 contestants pose for photographers outside 947 Grant (2007)

Eligibility is limited to unmarried United States citizens of Chinese descent between the ages of 17 and 26, which means the entrant's father or mother must be of Chinese descent. Local Chinatown beauty contests were won by the contestant that raised the most funds or sold the most raffle tickets for their family association, but these rules were changed. Initially, contestants were required to answer questions posed in Chinese, but by 1965, it was recognized that some, especially those who had not grown up in Chinatown, did not possess the necessary bilingual skills and the committee stopped factoring the Chinese language responses into the results. As of 2014, the four scored segments are introduction, talent, swimsuit, and question-and-answer. As of 2024, the swimsuit portion was replaced with a form & fitness section.

The winner of the Miss Chinatown USA title receives a US$10,000 scholarship and, during her reigning year, travels to meet with family associations, officials, and politicians in the United States and abroad as a goodwill ambassador. As a national pageant, the titleholder of Miss Chinatown USA also is eligible to enter the Miss Chinese International Pageant, a contest for women of Chinese descent not residing in China. For instance, Ni Jiang won Miss Chinatown USA in 2008, then competed in Miss Chinese International in early 2009.

The first runner-up for Miss Chinatown USA holds the simultaneous titles of First Princess and Miss Chinese Chamber of Commerce. Third place is named Second Princess. There is a separate award for Miss Talent, given to the contestant who receives the highest talent score.

=== Venue ===
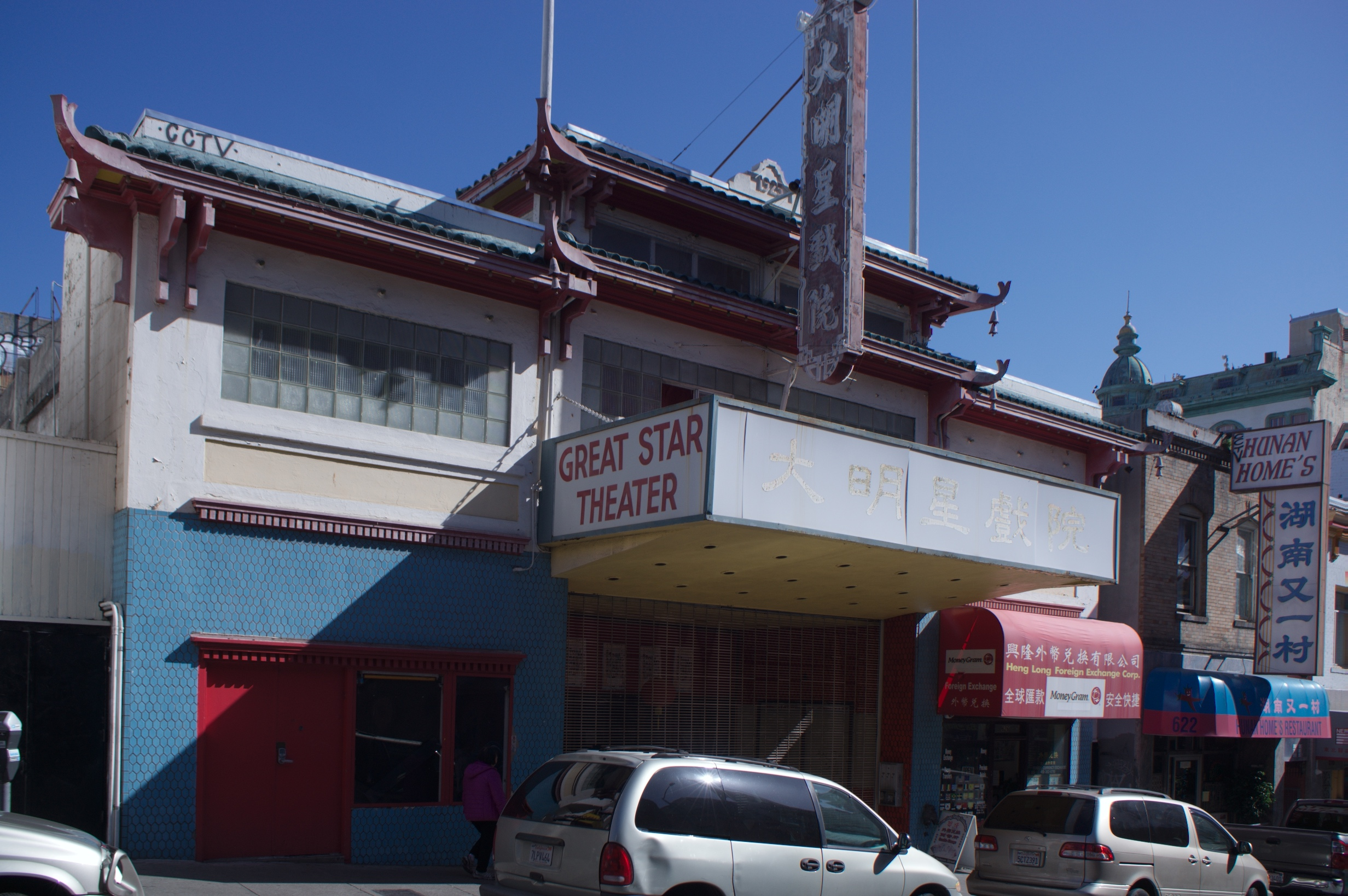
Great China (now Great Star) Theater, 2018

The first Miss Chinatown pageant was held on February 15, 1958, at the Great China Theater. The theater, now renamed as the Great Star, was completed in 1925 to stage Chinese operas and is still showing limited engagements and live performances. Since then, pageants have been held at larger event locations in San Francisco, including the SF Masonic Auditorium (starting in 1959), Palace of Fine Arts Theatre, and Hyatt Regency San Francisco.

Traditionally, a separate coronation ball is staged at a separate venue after the pageant. In 2012, the coronation ball was held at the Hilton San Francisco Union Square. In 2020, the coronation ball was held at the InterContinental San Francisco. Since 2022, the pageant and coronation ball occurred on the same night, in the same venue.

== List of Miss Chinatown USA titleholders ==
Year	Miss Chinatown USA		Origin City & State
1958	June Gong	周轉娣	Miami, FL
1959	Leona Lee	李麗卿	Honolulu, HI
1960	Carole Ng	吳惠芳	San Francisco, CA
1961	Irene Tsu	諸慧荷	New York, NY
1962	Darrah Lau	劉淑卿	Honolulu, HI
1963	Shirley Fong	鄺秋娥	Honolulu, HI
1964	Josie Leong	梁雁玲	Sacramento, CA
1965	Mary Tom	譚雅倫	Jamaica, NY
1966	Jacquelyn Chun	陳韻媛	Honolulu, HI
1967	Marilyn Lew	劉嫚蘭	San Francisco, CA
1968	Betty Wong	黃珍瓊	Sacramento, CA
1969	Carole Young	楊小薇	San Francisco, CA
Year	Miss Chinatown USA		Origin City & State
1970	Marion Lee	李金燕	Honolulu, HI
1971	Linda Shen	沈元元	Minneapolis, MN
1972	Trudy Young	容蓮愛	Honolulu, HI
1973	Sandra L. Wong	黃艷愛	Oakland, CA
1974	Pamela Fong	鄺素蘭	Sacramento, CA
1975	Jeannie Fung	馮亦明	San Francisco, CA
1976	Linda Sue Chun	陳桂媛	Honolulu, HI
1977	Sandra L.Q. Mew	繆麗昆	Honolulu, HI
1978	Stephanie Ann Lee	李儀寶	San Francisco, CA
1979	Glenda Tang	鄧靜雯	Columbia, SC
Year	Miss Chinatown USA		Origin City & State
1980	Ronda Ching	程慧珍	Honolulu, HI
1981	Rose Chung	張艷珍	San Francisco, CA
1982	Stephanie L. Shiu	邵小媚	Lemoore, CA
1983	Sandra Young	楊碧聯	Honolulu, HI
1984	Cynthia Gouw	吳義菊	Westwood, CA
1985	Audrey R. Liao	廖瑞曼	Baltimore, MD
1986	Amy Mae Woo	胡丁美	Sunnyvale, CA
1987	Crystal Lee Kwok	郭錦恩	San Francisco, CA
1988	Sylvia Shim	沈睡蓮	Honolulu, HI
1989	Lisa Chen	陳毓英	Montebello, CA
Year	Miss Chinatown USA		Origin City & State
1990	Evelyn Ding	丁嘉靜	Houston, TX
1991	Jennifer Tung	滕廣霞	Rodeo, CA
1992	Melissa M. Wu	吳美珩	San Francisco, CA
1993	Melissa Yeh	葉貞靖	Spring, TX
1994	Ivy Hsu	許慧馨	San Jose, CA
1995	Jamie Chou	周潔明	Berkeley, CA
1996	Grace Maa	馬友慈	Belle Mead, NJ
1997	Lori Young	楊兆妍	Honolulu, HI
1998	Gwendoline Yeo	楊時賢	San Francisco, CA
1999	Karen Chen	陳 媛	Union City, CA

Year	Miss Chinatown USA		Origin City & State
2000	Jennifer Lin Hong	項德慧	Pearl City, HI
2001	Pamela Woon	溫美玲	Seattle, WA
2002	Andra Chung	張 慧	Cupertino, CA
2003	Darah Annette Dung	鄧貴美	Honolulu, HI
2004	Shan Chen	陳 珊	New York, NY
2005	Carol Chen	陳盈璉	Dallas, TX
2006	Louise Suzanna Wu	吳如意	Fremont, CA
2007	Betty Hsu	徐仁惠	San Francisco, CA
2008	Ni Jiang	蔣 妮	Bellevue, WA
2009	Cindy Wu (aka:Cindy Yen)	吳欣雲/ 袁詠琳	Houston, TX
Year	Miss Chinatown USA		Origin City & State
2010	Crystal Lee	李萬晴	San Francisco, CA
2011	June Quan	關蓮珠	San Francisco, CA
2012	Steffi Hu	胡瑞欣	Sugar Land, TX
2013	Leah Li	李卓兒	Mercer Island, WA
2014	Karen Li	李凱若	Houston, TX
2015	Rose Li	李思佳	Houston, TX
2016	Stephanie Wong	黃嘉穎	Millbrae, CA
2017	Karen Lynn Yang	楊開潤	Sugar Land, TX
2018	Jasmine Lee	李萬莉	San Francisco, CA
2019	Katherine Wu	吳沛琳	San Francisco, CA
Year	Miss Chinatown USA		Origin City & State
2020	Lauren Yang	楊若潤	Sugar Land, TX
2021	Event cancelled		
2022	Crystal Lee	李詩濤	Castro Valley, CA
2023	Ashlyn Tsui	徐莊婕	Redwood City, CA
2024	Tara Wong-Nash	黃美華	Foster City, CA
2025	Sidney Yee Siu	肖美兰	Hercules, CA
2026	Janelle Liang	梁斐	Waipahu, HI
2027			
2028			

== Progress in Miss Chinese International ==
Year	Representative	Representing City & State	Placement/Progress in MCI	Placement in MCU	Year in MCU
1988	Tammy Lee	Seattle, WA	1st Runner-Up	Tammy Lee (Miss Chinese Chamber of Commerce 1988) competed as Miss Seattle Chinatown 1988.	
1989	Yu Ping Fan	Seattle, WA	Top 5	Yu Ping Fan (unplaced in MCU 1989) competed as Miss Seattle Chinatown 1989.	
1990	No Pageant Held				
1991	Deanna Leung	Seattle, WA		Deanna Leung (unplaced in MCU 1990) competed as Miss Seattle Chinatown 1990.	
1992	Rosemary Chan	Toronto, CA			
1993	Stephanie Chang	Seattle, WA	Top 12	Stephanie Chang (Miss Chinatown USA Third Princess 1992) competed as Miss Seattle Chinatown 1992.	
1994	I-Man Chao	Seattle, WA	2nd Runner-Up	I-Man Chao (Miss Chinese Chamber of Commerce 1993) competed as Miss Seattle Chinatown 1993.	
1995	Susan Chao	Seattle, WA		Susan Chao (unplaced in MCU 1994) competed as Miss Seattle Chinatown 1994.	
1996	Melissa M. Wu	San Francisco, CA	1st Runner-Up	Winner	1992
1996	Winnie Young	Hong Kong, HK	Top 10	Winnie Young (Miss San Francisco 1991) competed as Miss Hong Kong 1995.	
1996	Wen Sun	Seattle, WA		Wen Sun (unplaced in MCU 1995) competed as Miss Seattle Chinatown 1995.	
1997	Jamie Chou	San Francisco, CA		Winner	1995
1998	Louisa Luk	San Francisco, CA	Winner	Miss San Francisco (2nd Runner-Up)	1997
1999	Alice Tam	San Francisco, CA		Miss San Francisco (2nd Runner-Up)	1994
1999	Yan Wang	Seattle, WA		Yan Wang (unplaced in MCU 1998) competed as Miss Seattle Chinatown 1998.	
2000	Karen Chen	San Francisco, CA		Winner	1999
2001	Valerie Foo	San Francisco, CA		Miss San Francisco (2nd Runner-Up)	2000
2002	Pamela Woon	Seattle, WA		Winner	2001
2002	Michelle Lum	San Francisco, CA		3rd Princess	2001
2003	No Representative				
2004	No Representative				
2005	Annie Chang	San Francisco, CA	Top 5	Miss San Francisco (2nd Runner-Up)	2004
2005	Fala Chen	New York, NY	1st Runner-Up	Fala Chen (Miss Chinese Chamber of Commerce 2003) competed as Miss Chinese New York 2005.	
2006	No Representative				
2007	Louise Wu	San Francisco, CA	Top 10	Winner	2006
2008	No Representative				
2009	Ni Jiang	Seattle, WA	Top 5	Winner	2008
2009	Louisa Liu	San Francisco, CA		Miss San Francisco (2nd Runner-Up)	2007
2010	Amy Chu	San Francisco, CA		Miss San Francisco (2nd Runner-Up)	2009
2011	No Pageant Held				
2012	No Representative				
2013	Samantha Ark Chin	Seattle, WA		Samantha Ark Chin (unplaced in MCU 2010) competed as Miss Seattle Chinatown 2007.	
2014	Amanda Lee	San Francisco, CA		Miss Chinese Chamber of Commerce (1st Runner-Up)	2012
2015	Leah Li	Seattle, WA	Top 3 in National Costume	Winner	2013
2015	Shirley Liu	San Francisco, CA		Miss San Francisco (2nd Runner-Up)	2014
2016	No Representative				
2017	Stephanie Wong	San Francisco, CA	Top 10; Top 4 in Talent Performance	Winner	2016
2018	Rose Li	New York, NY	Winner	Rose Li (Miss Chinatown USA 2015) competed as Miss Chinese Beauty 2017 (formerly known as Miss Chinese New York).	
2018	Elisa Santos-Ko	San Francisco, CA	Top 10; Live Audience Most Liked Performance Award (Miss Talent)	Miss San Francisco (2nd Runner-Up)	2017
2019	Stephanie Wang	Honolulu, HI	1st Runner-Up	Stephanie Wang (Miss Chinatown USA Second Princess 2017) competed as Miss Chinatown Hawaii 2017.	
2019	Maggie Huang	San Francisco, CA		Miss San Francisco (2nd Runner-Up)	2018
2020	Pageant deferred to 2021				
