= Tara Dawn Holland =

American beauty pageant contestant (born 1972)

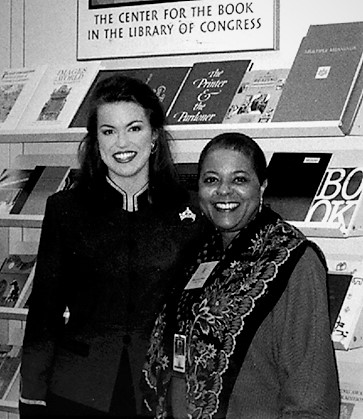
- Holland (left) visits Maurvene Williams, program officer in the Library of Congress, in 1997
- Born: October 2, 1972 (age 53); Mobile, Alabama, U.S.
- Education: University of Missouri–Kansas City; Florida State University
- Title: Miss Flint Hills 1996; Miss Kansas 1996; Miss America 1997
- Predecessor: Shawntel Smith
- Successor: Katherine Shindle
- Spouse: Jon Lynn Christensen (m. 1998)
- Children: 2

Tara Dawn Holland (born October 2, 1972) is an American beauty pageant contestant, who was Miss America 1997.

== Education ==
Holland attended Florida State University and was selected for membership in Omicron Delta Kappa in 1993. In December 2002, Holland graduated summa cum laude with her master's degree in music education from the University of Missouri–Kansas City.

== Literacy advocacy ==
After six years as a local literacy advocate and tutor, she took her cause to the national spotlight when she was crowned Miss America 1997. She spent the year fighting for literacy education for people of all ages and backgrounds, as well as raising funds and motivating those involved in the cause. Since her year of service, she has continued to speak for local, state, and national organizations on this critical issue.

== Public appearances ==
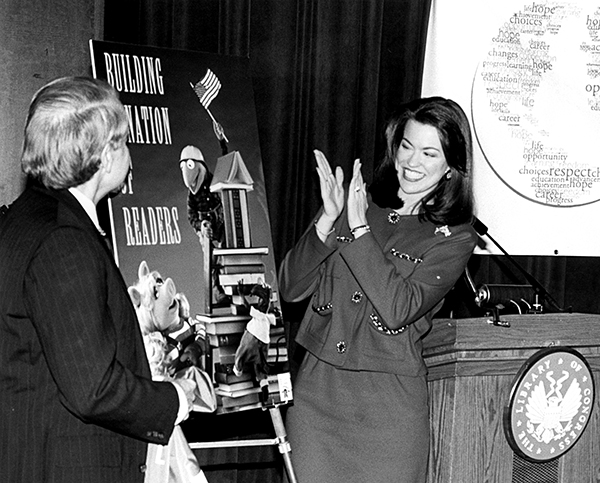
John Cole, director for the Center for the Book in the Library of Congress, and Tara Holland unveil the new "Building a Nation of Readers" poster at the Library of Congress, 1997

In addition to traveling as a speaker, Holland has enjoyed many opportunities to perform musically. She has been featured as a vocal soloist with the Kansas City Symphony, the U.S. Air Force Band, and the NATO Band in Italy. She was also a featured vocalist in the nationally televised Boston Pops Fourth of July Celebration and the Macy's Thanksgiving Day Parade. In addition, she had the honor of singing at two of President George W. Bush's inaugural events, including the Armory Ball, the largest official Inaugural Ball.

Holland has appeared on various media outlets, including The Tonight Show with Jay Leno, Late Night with Conan O'Brien, Live with Regis and Kathie Lee, Today, Fox News Sunday with Tony Snow, Parade, People, and Focus on the Family radio show, among others. In addition to commercials, public service announcements, and her cameo role on The Nanny, some of her other highlights are the 1997 Kansan of the Year, President Bush's Daily Point of Light #723, and the 1997 Kansas Woman of Achievement.

== Personal life ==
Holland and her husband, former U.S. Congressman Jon Lynn Christensen, live in Franklin, Tennessee. They have two daughters, Petra and Sela.

Holland is active with youth, both in her local community and as a national sexual abstinence speaker to tens of thousands of students per year. She also sings and speaks for women's groups, fundraisers, and churches.

== Trivia ==
The video of her receiving her crown was shown at the beginning of the 2006 film, Little Miss Sunshine.

Awards and achievements
Preceded by Shawntel Smith	Miss America; 1997	Succeeded by Katherine Shindle
Preceded by Amy Keller	Miss Kansas; 1996	Succeeded by Jennifer Parks
Preceded by Heather Geery	National Sweetheart; 1995	Succeeded by Stacey Momeyer
