= Jon Christensen (politician) =

American politician

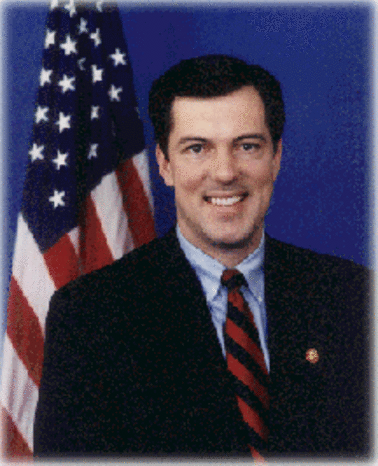

Member of the U.S. House of Representatives from Nebraska's 2nd district
- In office January 3, 1995 – January 3, 1999
- Preceded by: Peter Hoagland
- Succeeded by: Lee Terry

Personal details
- Born: Jon Lynn Christensen; February 20, 1963 (age 63) St. Paul, Nebraska, U.S.
- Party: Republican
- Spouses: Meredith Stewart Maxfield (m. 1987; div. 1996); Tara Holland (m. 1998)
- Children: 2
- Education: Midland University (BA); South Texas College of Law (JD)

Jon Lynn Christensen (born February 20, 1963) is an American lawyer, politician and corporate executive who served two terms as a member of the United States House of Representatives from Nebraska from 1995 to 1999.

== Early life ==
Jon Lynn Christensen was born on February 20, 1963, in St. Paul, Nebraska, to Audrey Thayer (1932 - 2019) and Harlan Christensen (1931 - 1996). He has two siblings, Jim and Kay. He graduated from St. Paul High School, earned a Bachelor of Arts in business and biology from Midland Lutheran College in 1985, and a Juris Doctor from South Texas College of Law in Houston in 1989. He was admitted to the bar in Nebraska in 1992.

== Career ==
Christensen was vice president of COMREP, Inc. He was a marketer and salesperson for Connecticut Mutual Insurance Company. For his last several years prior to serving in Congress, he was an insurance executive and helped form the Aquila Group, Inc.

=== Congress ===
Christensen was elected as a Republican to the 104th and 105th United States Congresses serving from January 3, 1995, to January 3, 1999. In 1998, he ran for Governor of Nebraska but came third in the Republican primary behind State Auditor John Breslow and Mike Johanns, who went on to win the general election.

Christiansen voted yes on the Housing for Older Persons Act of 1995, which would ultimately be passed by the House of Representatives in a 424-5 vote. The Act passed the Senate in a 94-3 vote and it was signed into law by President Bill Clinton on December 28, 1995.

Christiansen voted yes on the Jerusalem Embassy Act of 1995, which would pass through the House in a 374-37 vote. It went through the Senate where it was passed in a 93-5 vote. It became law on November 8, 1995 without a presidential signature.

Christiansen voted yes on the Food Quality Protection Act of 1996, which was passed in the House by a unanimous vote of 417-0. It was passed in the Senate in a unanimous vote. President Bill Clinton signed it into law on August 3, 1996.

Christiansen voted yes on the Defense of Marriage Act of 1996. The act was passed by the House in a 342-67 vote. The Senate passed the bill in an 84-15 vote. President Bill Clinton signed the bill into law on September 21, 1996. The Defense of Marriage Act was overturned by the Supreme Court in the case Obergefell v. Hodges, which occurred in 2015. The Act was struck down in its entirety by the Respect for Marriage Act, which was passed by the 117th Congress in 2022.

Christiansen voted 'yea' on all four articles of impeachment against President Bill Clinton in 1998, including both perjury charges, obstruction of justice, and abuse of power.

=== Later career ===
After leaving Congress, he became an attorney and policy advocate in Washington, D.C.

Christensen is a member of the ReFormers Caucus of Issue One.

== Personal life ==
Christensen has been married twice. He married Meredith Stewart Maxfield in 1987. The marriage ended in divorce in 1996. In 1998, he married the former Miss America, Tara Dawn Holland; they have two daughters.

U.S. order of precedence (ceremonial)
Preceded by John Cavanaugh as Former U.S. Representative	Order of precedence of the United States as Former U.S. Representative	Succeeded by Bob Beauprez as Former U.S. Representative
