= Katherine Shindle =

American actress and former Miss America

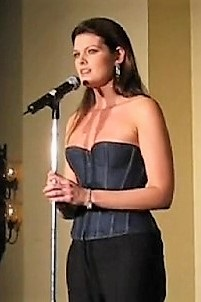
- Shindle sings before the 2008 Alamo Bowl
- Born: Katherine Renee Shindle; January 31, 1977 (age 49); Toledo, Ohio, U.S.
- Education: Northwestern University
- Occupations: Actor; singer; dancer; AIDS prevention advocate
- Years active: 1997–present
- Title: Miss America 1998; Miss Illinois 1997; President of Actors' Equity Association (2015-2024)
- Predecessor: Tara Dawn Holland
- Successor: Nicole Johnson

16th President of the Actors' Equity Association
- In office 2015–2024
- Preceded by: Nick Wyman
- Succeeded by: Brooke Shields

Katherine Renee Shindle (born January 31, 1977) is an American actress, singer, dancer, and AIDS activist. From 2015 to 2024 she served as the President of the Actors' Equity Association. She was Miss America 1998 in 1998 and Miss Illinois in 1997.

== Biography ==
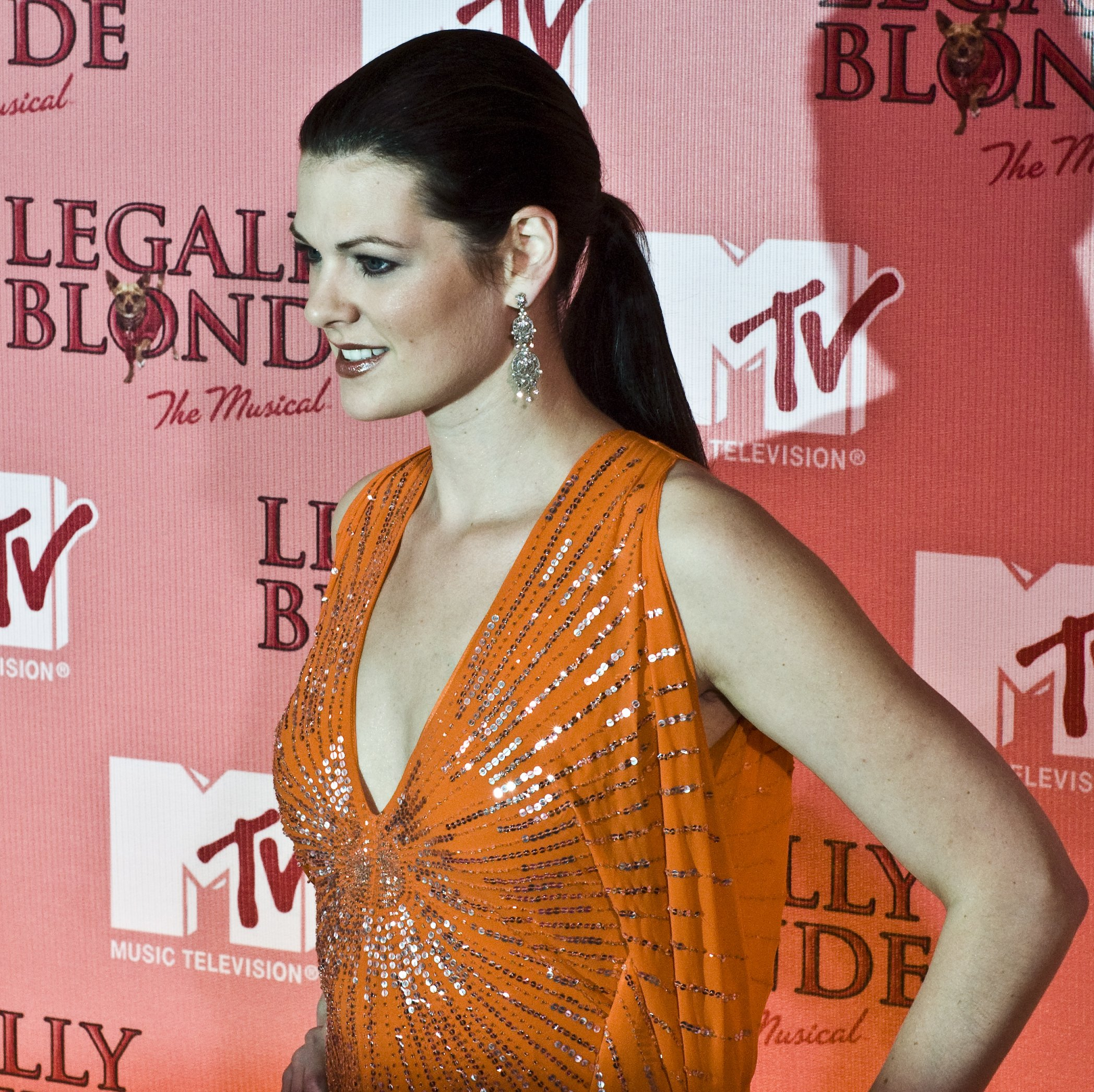
Kate Shindle at MTV taping of Legally Blonde on September 18, 2007

Shindle was born in Toledo, Ohio, grew up in Brigantine, New Jersey and Moorestown, New Jersey and attended high school at Bishop Eustace Preparatory School. She was a double major in sociology and theater (with a minor in musical theater) at Northwestern University. She has worked as an actress in New York since 1999. Shindle is also a licensed real estate agent.

Shindle appeared (as a replacement) in the Broadway production of Jekyll & Hyde as understudy for the role of Lucy and several other roles. After being cast by co-directors Sam Mendes and Rob Marshall, she played the role of Sally Bowles in the 1998 Broadway revival of Cabaret on the national tour in 2000–2001, and on Broadway during June–July 2001. She played this role again in the Maltz Jupiter Theatre (Jupiter, Florida) production, starting in January 2012, and was nominated for a 2013 Carbonell Award. In 2007-2008 she appeared in the Broadway musical Legally Blonde as Vivienne Kensington. She played the Mad Hatter in the Broadway production of Wonderland in 2011.

She appeared in a concert version of Jeykll & Hyde in September 2004 at the Mohegan Sun Casino's Cabaret Theatre in Uncasville, Connecticut, playing Lucy. She then toured in the United States with the concert version, starting in September 2005, and recorded the role on the Jekyll & Hyde: Resurrection album.

In 2014, she wrote a memoir, Being Miss America: Behind the Rhinestone Curtain, published by the University of Texas Press.

In 2015, she defeated incumbent Nick Wyman for the presidency of the Actors' Equity Association, a position she held until 2024, when she declined to run for another term.

== Filmography ==
Film roles
Year	Title	Role	Notes
2004	The Stepford Wives	Beth Peters	
2004	Seven Ten Split	Kate	Short film
2005	Capote	Rose	
2014	Lucky Stiff	Dominique	Also performer
Television roles
Year	Title	Role	Notes
1997	77th Miss America Pageant	Herself / Miss Illinois	TV special
1998	The 78th Annual Miss America Pageant	Herself / Miss America 1998	TV special
1999	Today	Herself / Correspondent	Episode: "Episode dated 20 December 1999"
2004	As the World Turns	Flight Attendant	Episode: "Episode dated 23 August 2004"
2005	Chasing the Crown	Herself / Host	Television film
2007	Legally Blonde: The Musical	Vivienne Kensington	Television film; also performer
2008	Legally Blonde the Musical: The Search for Elle Woods	Herself	Episodes: "These Pink Boots Are Made for Walking", "A Star Is Born"
2009	White Collar	Female Anchor	Episode: "Flip of the Coin"
2010	Gossip Girl	Samantha	Episode: "Goodbye, Columbia"
2011	Last Cake Standing	Herself / Judge	Episode: "Cakes Got Talent"
2014	Law & Order: Special Victims Unit	Julianne	Episode: "Reasonable Doubt"
2019	The Good Fight	Rachelle Dax	7 episodes
2019	Elementary	Danielle Olivera	Episode: "On the Scent"

== Theater ==
=== Broadway ===
- Jekyll & Hyde (1997) – A Young Girl; Bet; Bridesmaid; Housemaid; Nurse; Lucy u/s
- Cabaret (2001) – Sally Bowles
- Legally Blonde (2007) – Vivienne Kensington
- 8 (2011) – Court Clerk
- Wonderland (2011) – The Mad Hatter
- Dracula, the Musical (2011) – Mina

=== National Tour ===
- Cabaret (2000) – Sally Bowles
- Fun Home (2016) – Alison Bechdel

=== Regional ===
- Pippin (2004) - The Leading Player - Broadway Cares/Equity Fights AIDS Concert
- Oliver! (2010) - Nancy
- Cabaret (2012) – Sally Bowles
- The Sting (2018) – Billie – Paper Mill Playhouse
- Cabaret (2019) – Sally Bowles

== Publications ==
- Shindle, Kate. Being Miss America: Behind the Rhinestone Curtain, University of Texas Press, 2014.
- Shindle, Kate. "The Real Housewives of Miss America." Daily Beast, September 21, 2014.
- Shindle, Kate (December 26, 2006). "Running low on role models: Miss Nevada's out, Tara Conner's wobbly reign continues, and we're left wondering: What are beauty queens for, anyway?". Salon (website). Archived from the original on September 3, 2014.

Awards and achievements
Preceded by Tara Dawn Holland	Miss America; 1998	Succeeded by Nicole Johnson
Preceded by Tania Gibson	Miss Illinois; 1997	Succeeded by Ashley Eisenhauer
