= Miss America's Outstanding Teen 2010 =

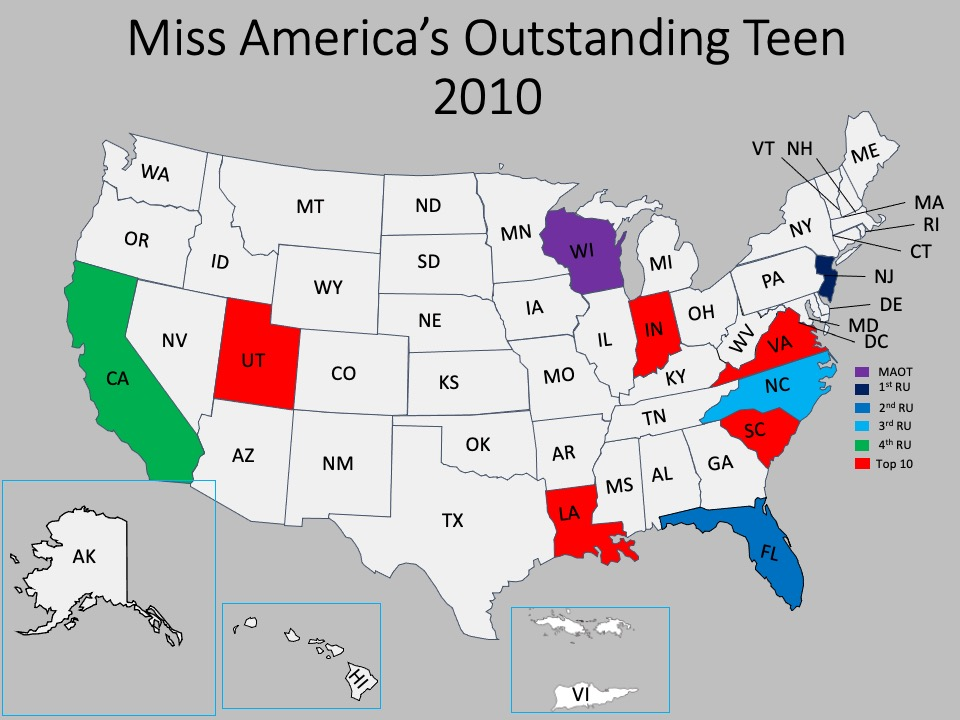
- Miss America's Outstanding Teen 2010 Participants and Results
- Date: August 15, 2009
- Presenters: Katie Stam
- Venue: Linda Chapin Theater
- Entrants: 52
- Winner: Jeanette Morelan; Wisconsin

Miss America's Outstanding Teen 2010 was the 5th Miss America's Outstanding Teen pageant, held at the Linda Chapin Theatre in the Orange County Convention Center in Orlando, Florida on August 15, 2009.

Taylor Hanna Fitch of South Carolina crowned her successor Jeanette Morelan of Wisconsin at the end of the event. This was the first time that Miss Wisconsin's Outstanding Teen captured the title of Miss America's Outstanding Teen. Miss America 2009 Katie Stam was an emcee for the pageant.

== Results ==
=== Placements ===
Placement	Contestant
Miss America's Outstanding Teen 2010	Wisconsin – Jeanette Morelan
1st Runner-Up	New Jersey – Brenna Weick
2nd Runner-Up	Florida – Myrrhanda Jones
3rd Runner-Up	North Carolina – Katherine Puryear
4th Runner-Up	California – Monica Stainer
Top 10	Indiana – Lydia Daley; Louisiana – Kelly Bernard; South Carolina – Ali Rogers; Utah – Meredith Gaufin; Virginia – Courtney Garrett

=== Other awards ===
Award	Contestant(s)
Academic Life	Utah - Meredith Gaufin
Academic Scholarship	Iowa - Jessica Baker
CMN Community Service	Connecticut - Acacia Courtney
Non-finalist Evening Wear/OSQ	(Washington, D.C.) District of Columbia - Hope Wiseman
Non-finalist Interview	(Washington, D.C.) District of Columbia - Hope Wiseman
Non-finalist Talent	Rhode Island - Emily Luther
Preliminary Evening Wear/OSQ	California - Monica Stainer; (Washington, D.C.) District of Columbia - Hope Wiseman; Florida - Myrrhanda Jones; New Jersey - Brenna Weick
Preliminary Talent	California - Monica Stainer; Indiana - Lydia Daley; Rhode Island - Emily Luther
Scholastic Excellence	Missouri - Lauren McCreight
Spirit of America	Colorado - Janelle Orsborn

== Contestants ==
The Miss America's Outstanding Teen 2010 contestants were:

State	Name	Hometown	Age	Local Title	Talent	Placement at MAO Teen	Special scholarships at MAO Teen	Notes
Alabama	Avery Cooper	Smiths Station		Miss Teen Chattahoochie Valley				
Alaska	Veronica Temple	Eagle River	16	Miss Teen Anchorage	Vocal			One of 13 children Sister of Sarah Temple, Miss Alaska USA 2010 Later Miss Alaska Teen USA 2012
Arizona	Katelyn Niemiec	Scottsdale	15	Miss Teen Twirling Athlete	Baton Twirling			Contestant at National Sweetheart 2013 pageant Later Miss Arizona 2016
Arkansas	Savvy Shields	Fayetteville	14	Miss Teen Heart of the Ozarks	Dance			Later Miss Collegiate America 2013 Later Miss Arkansas 2016; Crowned Miss America 2017
California	Monica Stainer	Huntington Beach	15	Miss Teen City of Los Angeles	Classical Ballet	4th runner-up	Preliminary Evening Wear/OSQ Award Preliminary Talent Award	
Colorado	Janelle Orsborn	Brighton	17				Spirit of America Award	
Connecticut	Acacia Courtney	Hamden	16	Miss Nutmeg's Outstanding Teen	Ballet en Pointe		Community Service Award	Later Miss Connecticut 2014 Currently a TV reporter and paddock analyst for Gulfstream Park Later Miss Connecticut USA 2019
Delaware	Danielle Marshall	Middletown	15	Miss New Castle County's Outstanding Teen	Gymnastics/Dance			
(Washington, D.C.) District of Columbia	Hope Wiseman	Washington D.C.	17				Non-Finalist Interview Award Non-Finalist Evening Wear/OSQ Award Preliminary Evening Wear/OSQ Award	
Florida	Myrrhanda Jones	Gainesville	16	Miss Gainesville's Outstanding Teen	Twirl/Dance	2nd runner-up	Preliminary Evening Wear/OSQ Award	Later Miss Florida 2013; 3rd runner-up at Miss America 2014 pageant
(Georgia (U.S. state)) Georgia	Brianna Godshalk	Acworth	16	Miss Cobb County's Outstanding Teen	Violin, "Zigeunerweisen" by Pablo de Sarasate			
Hawaii	Napua Salbedo	Makawao	17	Miss Maui's Outstanding Teen				
Idaho	Carley Campbell	Meridian	17	At-Large				
Illinois	Andrea Novak		17	Miss Dupage County's Outstanding Teen				
Indiana	Lydia Daley	Fort Wayne		Miss Northeast's Outstanding Teen	Vocal	Top 10	Preliminary Talent Award	
Iowa	Jessica Baker	Coralville	16	Miss Henry County's Outstanding Teen			Kara Iverson Academic Scholarship Award	
Kansas	Chelsea Chilcott	Derby	16		Ventriloquism, "Coffee in a Cardboard Cup"			
Kentucky	Madison McCowan	London		Miss Bowling Green's Outstanding Teen				
Louisiana	Kelly Bernard	Hammond	16	Miss Monroe's Outstanding Teen	Vocal	Top 10		2nd runner-up at Miss Louisiana 2014 pageant Top 10 at National Sweetheart 2014 pageant
Maine	Kristin Korda	Saco			Vocal			Later Miss Maine 2013
Maryland	Stephanie Meadowcroft	Bel Air		Miss Greater Baltimore's Outstanding Teen				Contestant at National Sweetheart 2017 pageant
Massachusetts	Brianna Marie Bostick	East Tauton	16					2nd runner-up at Miss Massachusetts 2016 pageant
Michigan	Haley Williams	Saline	16	At-Large				Later Miss Michigan 2013
Minnesota	Katlyn Ziegler	Coon Rapids						
Mississippi	Laura Lee Lewis	Brookhaven	15	Miss Heartland's Outstanding Teen	Vocal			Later Miss Mississippi 2016
Missouri	Lauren McCreight	Springfield	16	Miss Gateway St. Louis' Outstanding Teen	Vocal, "Girl in 14G"		Scholastic Excellence Award	
Montana	Alysse Charlesworth	Glendive						1st runner-up at Miss Montana 2012 and 2016 pageants
Nebraska	JaCee Pilkington	Minatare	17		Vocal			Later Miss Nebraska 2013
Nevada	Jordan Orris	Henderson		Miss Lake Las Vegas Area's Outstanding Teen				Later Distinguished Young Woman of Nevada 2012
New Hampshire	Katrina Rossi	Hampstead	17	Miss Lakes Region's Outstanding Teen				
New Jersey	Brenna Weick	Mantua	15	Miss Coastal Shore's Outstanding Teen	Vocal	1st runner-up	Preliminary Evening Wear/OSQ Award	Top 10 at National Sweetheart 2013 pageant Later Miss New Jersey 2016
New Mexico	Ashley Fresquez	Rio Rancho	14					Later Miss New Mexico 2018
(New York (state)) New York	Kara Jae Kowalski	Staten Island	15	Miss Richmond County's Outstanding Teen				
North Carolina	Katherine Puryear	Trinity	16	Miss Thomasville's Outstanding Teen		3rd runner-up		Later Miss North Carolina Teen USA 2012
North Dakota	Becca Lebak	Bismarck		Miss Dakota Territory's Outstanding Teen				
Ohio	Veronica Wende	Lima	17	Miss Greater Butler County's Outstanding Teen				Contestant at National Sweetheart 2016 pageant
Oklahoma	Georgia Frazier	Tulsa	17	Miss Tulsa State Fair's Outstanding Teen				Later Miss Oklahoma 2015; Top 10 at Miss America 2016 pageant
Oregon	Amanda Gonzalez-Merrill	Springfield	16	Miss Tri-Valley's Outstanding Teen				
Pennsylvania	Jill Wiley	Washington Boro	16	Miss Central Pennsylvania's Outstanding Teen	Broadway Vocal			Cast in the national touring company of Beauty and the Beast Cast as Maria Rainer in national tour of The Sound of Music
Rhode Island	Emily Luther	Woonsocket	17		Vocal, "At Last" by Mack Gordon and Harry Warren		Non-finalist Talent Award Preliminary Talent Award	Made viral YouTube cover of Adele's "Someone Like You" with Charlie Puth in 2011; Appeared on The Ellen DeGeneres Show with Puth; Both Puth and Luther were signed onto DeGeneres' label eleveneleven Contestant on The Voice
South Carolina	Ali Rogers	Laurens	17	Miss Laurens County Teen	Piano, "In the Mood"	Top 10		Later Miss South Carolina 2012; 1st runner-up at Miss America 2013 pageant
South Dakota	Jessica Dyk	Rapid City		Miss Rapid City's Outstanding Teen				
Tennessee	Victoria Carlton	Brentwood		Miss Nashville's Outstanding Teen				
Texas	Taylor Lowery	Lufkin	16	Miss Teen Frisco	Jazz Dance			
Utah	Meredith Gaufin	Provo			Harp	Top 10	Academic Life Award	Later Utah's Junior Miss 2010
Vermont	Sarah Cramton	Thetford	17		Vocal, "America the Beautiful"			
Virginia	Courtney Garrett	Pamplin	17	Miss Central Virginia's Outstanding Teen	Vocal	Top 10		Later Miss Virginia 2014; 1st runner-up at Miss America 2015 pageant
(United States Virgin Islands) Virgin Islands	A'Jada Burke	Saint Croix						
(Washington (state)) Washington	Reina Almon	Yakima	17	Miss Apple County's Outstanding Teen	Vocal			Contestant at National Sweetheart 2012 pageant Later Miss Washington 2013
West Virginia	Jackie Riggleman	Moorefield		Miss Teen Tucker County	Jazz Dance			
Wisconsin	Jeanette Morelan	Racine	15	Miss Southern Wisconsin's Outstanding Teen	Vocal, "Think of Me" from The Phantom of the Opera	Winner		Sister of Miss Wisconsin's Outstanding Teen 2013, JamieNicole Morelan Later Distinguished Young Woman of Wisconsin 2012 4th runner-up at Miss Tennessee 2016 pageant
Wyoming	Morgan Mariner	Douglas	17	Miss Douglas' Outstanding Teen				
