= Miss America 2014 =

87th edition of the Miss America competition

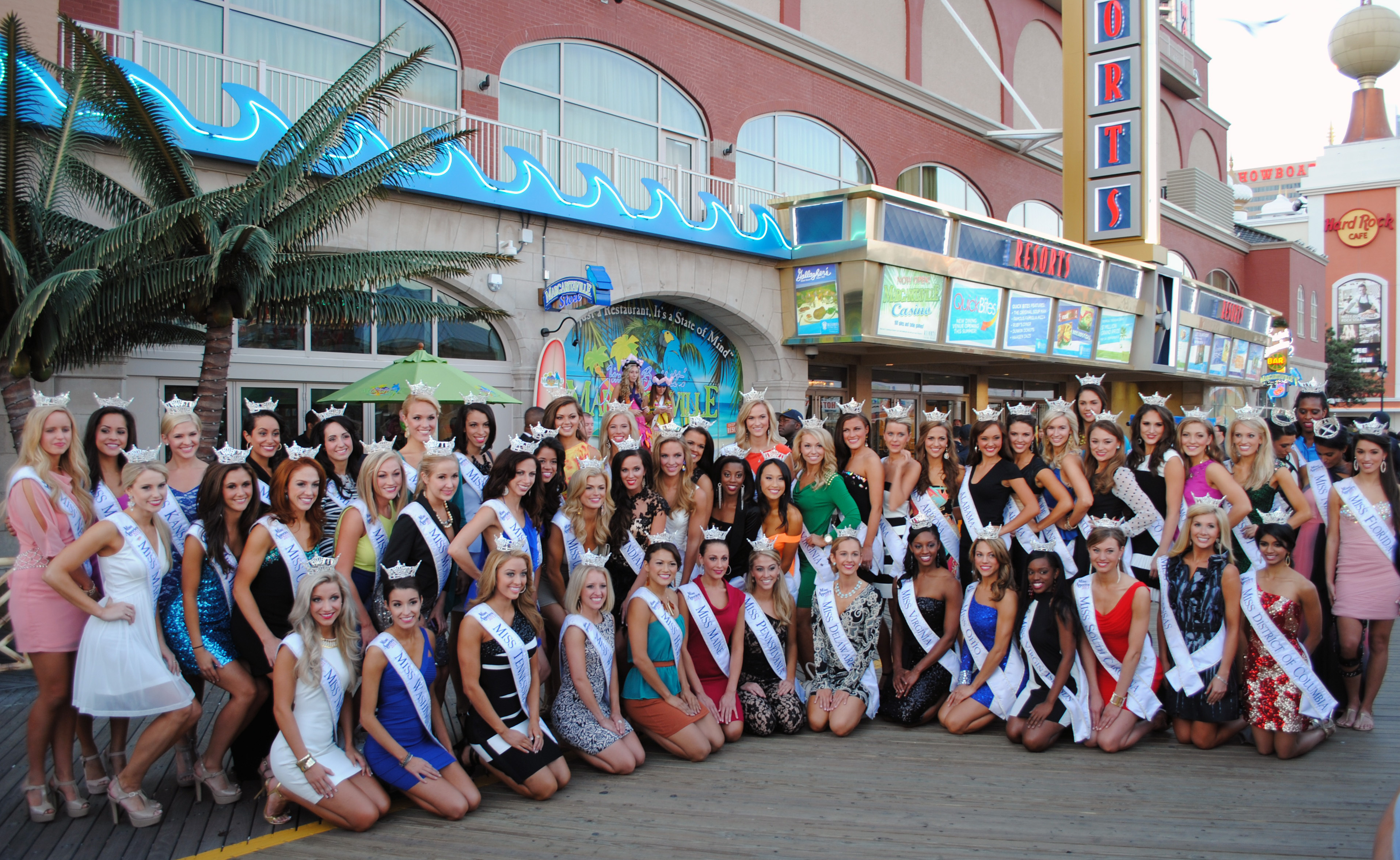
- Date: September 15, 2013
- Presenters: Chris Harrison; Lara Spencer
- Venue: Boardwalk Hall, Atlantic City, New Jersey, United States
- Broadcaster: ABC
- Entrants: 53
- Placements: 15
- Winner: Nina Davuluri; New York
- Congeniality: Ciera Pekarcik; Utah; Brooke Mosteller; South Carolina

Miss America 2014 was the 87th Miss America pageant, held at the Boardwalk Hall in Atlantic City, New Jersey, on September 15, 2013.

Mallory Hagan of New York crowned Nina Davuluri of New York as her successor at the end of the event.

== Overview ==
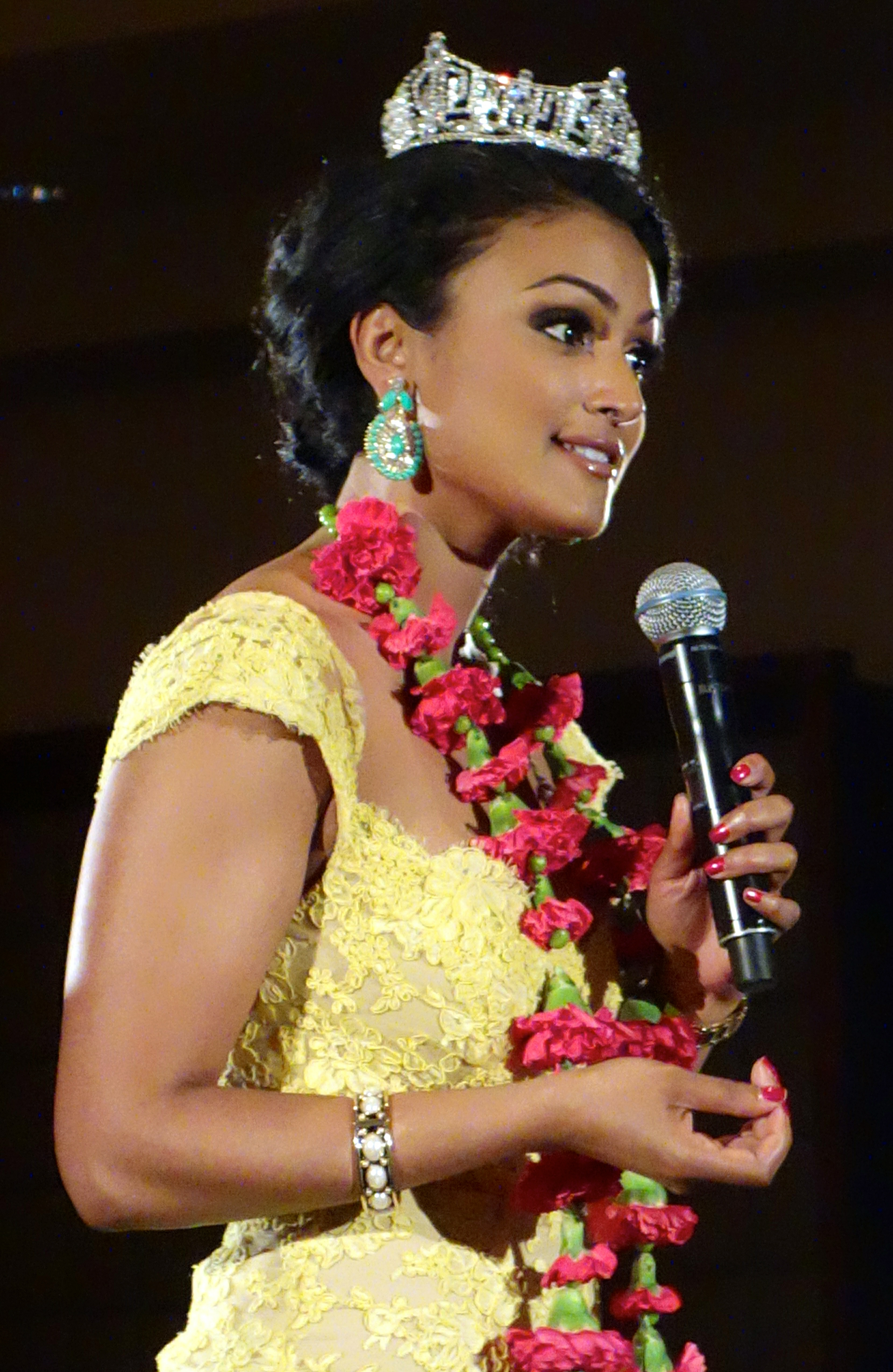
Miss New York, Nina Davuluri: Miss America 2014

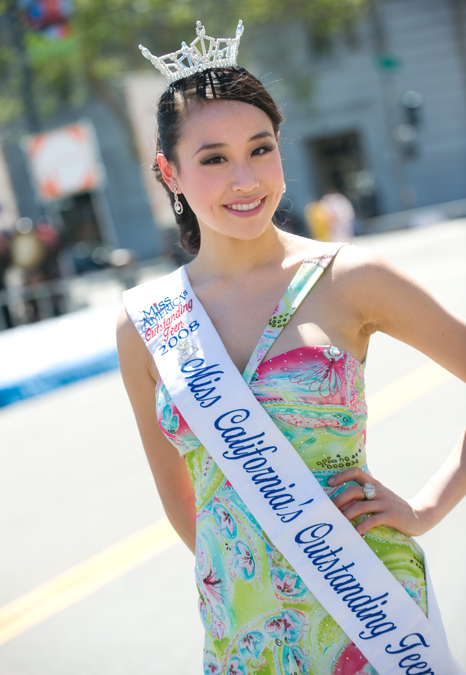
Miss California: Crystal Lee, 1st runner-up: Miss America 2014

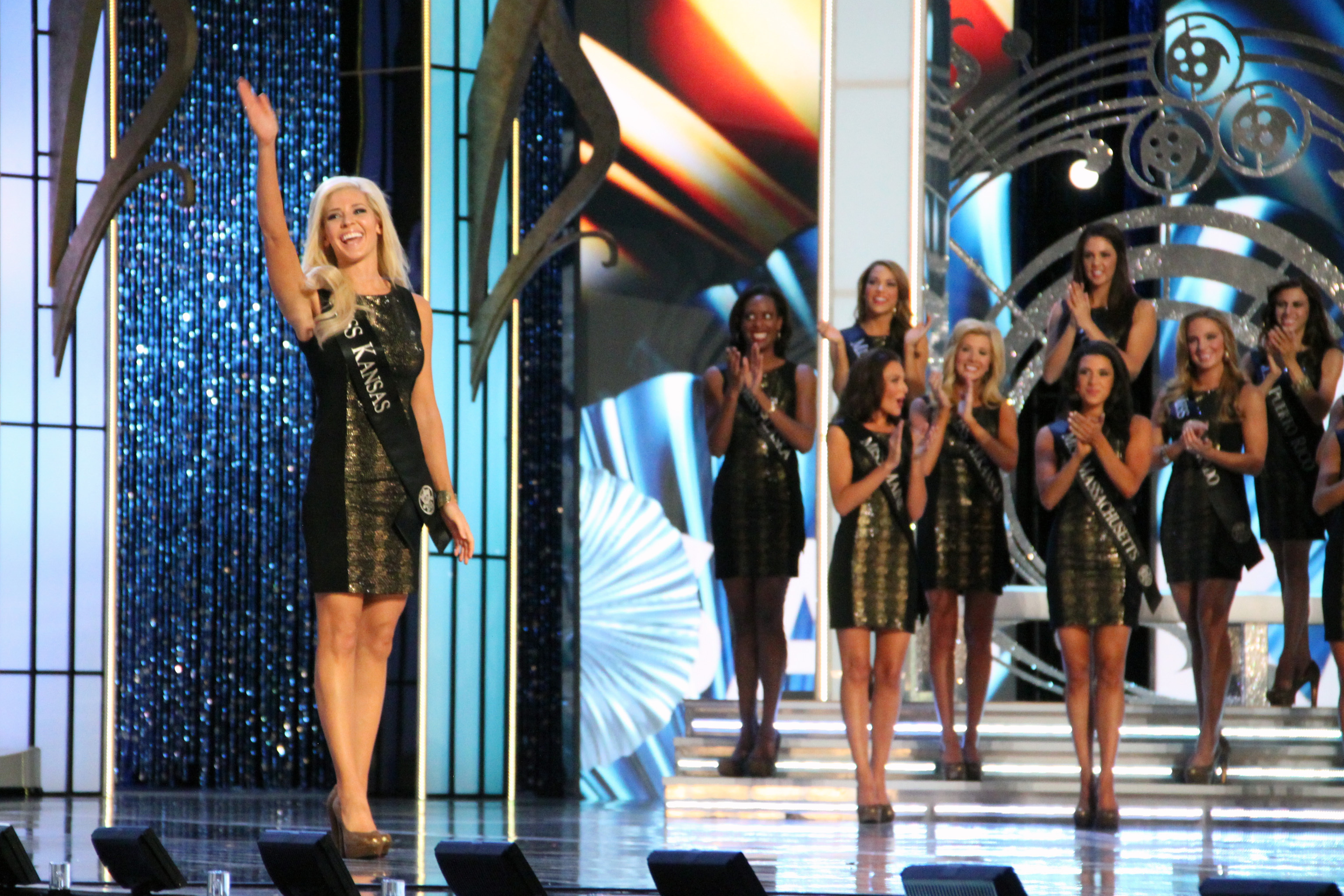
Miss Kansas, Theresa Vail America's Choice: Miss America 2014

Previously held in the month of January in the Las Vegas Strip's Theatre for the Performing Arts (Planet Hollywood Resort and Casino), the Miss America Pageant returned to both its original location and September broadcast after nine years. Prior to the pageant, the partially restored Boardwalk Hall Auditorium Organ was played for the first time in more than 40 years. The program was co-hosted by Chris Harrison and Lara Spencer and was broadcast live on ABC. The panel of celebrity judges for the top 15 finalists were: Deidre Downs Gunn, Carla Hall, Barbara Corcoran, Amar'e Stoudemire, Lance Bass, Joshua Bell, and Mario Cantone.

In the final moments of the pageant, Miss California Crystal Lee and Miss New York Nina Davuluri were the last contestants left on the stage. They were approached by co-host Lara Spencer who asked how they were feeling at that moment. Davuluri stated that she and Lee were "both so proud. We’re making history right here, standing here as Asian-Americans.” However, shortly after Davuluri was crowned Miss America 2014, xenophobic and racist comments relating the proximity of the event date to the nine-eleven anniversary and to anti-Indian sentiment appeared in American social media. News agencies cited tweets that misidentified her as Muslim or Arab, associated her with groups such as Al-Qaeda, and questioned why she was chosen over Miss Kansas Theresa Vail. Davuluri said that she was prepared for the social media response because "as Miss New York, I was called a terrorist and very similar remarks." Davuluri is the second Miss Syracuse to win the title after Miss New York 1983, Vanessa Lynn Williams who was the first African American winner and Miss America 1984. Both Davuluri and Williams won when the pageant was held in Atlantic City and both faced a backlash over their respective wins. In addition, Congressperson Grace Meng compared Davuluri to Miss New York 1945, Bess Myerson (the first and to date only Jewish-American winner and Miss America 1945) who also faced bigotry during her time as Miss America.

Miss Kansas Theresa Vail denounced this response on her blog and in interviews. In addition, Vail, herself, was the first contestant to display tattoos in the swimsuit competition (the United States Army Dental Command insignia on her left shoulder and the Serenity Prayer along her right side). Nicole Kelly, Miss Iowa, became the first contestant born without part of one arm (her left forearm) and Miss Florida, Myrrhanda Jones, won the preliminary talent competition for her baton twirling routine in the week prior to the Miss America 2014 pageant, despite suffering a torn ACL and MCL in rehearsal just a few hours prior to her scheduled performance. During Miss America 2014, she performed with a decorated leg brace.

== Results ==
=== Placements ===
Placement	Contestant
Miss America 2014	New York – Nina Davuluri
1st Runner-Up	California – Crystal Lee
2nd Runner-Up	Oklahoma – Kelsey Griswold
3rd Runner-Up	Florida – Myrrhanda Jones
4th Runner-Up	Minnesota – Rebecca Yeh
Top 10	Connecticut – Kaitlyn Tarpey; Georgia – Carly Mathis; Kansas – Theresa Vail *; Maryland – Christina Denny; Texas – Ivana Hall
Top 12	Missouri – Shelby Ringdahl; Wisconsin – Paula Mae Kuiper
Top 15	Arkansas – Amy Crain; Kentucky – Jenna Day; Mississippi – Chelsea Rick

* – America's Choice

== Contestants ==
53 contestants competed for the title.

State	Name	Hometown	Age	Talent	Placement	Awards	Notes
Alabama	Chandler Champion	Leeds	20	Ballet en pointe		Non-finalist Talent Award	
Alaska	Michelle Taylor	Anchorage	20	Piano			
Arizona	Jennifer Smestad	Gilbert	20	Vocal			
Arkansas	Amy Crain	Hot Springs	23	Contemporary Clogging	Top 15		4th runner-up at National Sweetheart 2010 pageant
California	Crystal Lee	San Francisco	22	Ballet en pointe	1st runner-up	STEM Scholarship Award	Previously Miss California's Outstanding Teen 2008; Top 10 at Miss America's Outstanding Teen 2009 pageant
Colorado	Meg Kardos	Denver	23	Vocal			
Connecticut	Kaitlyn Tarpey	Stamford	21	Irish Step Dancing	Top 10		Previously Miss Teen America 2008–09 representing New York Contestant at National Sweetheart 2012 pageant
Delaware	Rebecca Jackson	Kennett Square, PA	21	Broadway Vocal		Non-finalist Talent Award	
(Washington, D.C.) District of Columbia	Bindhu Pamarthi	Washington, D.C.	23	Bollywood Dance			
Florida	Myrrhanda Jones	Gainesville	19	Baton	3rd runner-up	Preliminary Talent Award	Previously Miss Florida's Outstanding Teen 2009; 2nd runner-up at Miss America's Outstanding Teen 2010 pageant
(Georgia (U.S. state)) Georgia	Carly Mathis	Leesburg	22	Vocal	Top 10	Preliminary Lifestyle & Fitness Award	Contestant at National Sweetheart 2012 pageant
Hawaii	Crystal Lee	Waipahu	22	Contemporary Dance			
Idaho	Sarah Downs	Emmett	23	Violin		Four Points Award	
Illinois	Brittany Smith	Elmhurst	23	Irish Step Dancing			
Indiana	Terrin Thomas	Auburn	20	Vocal			
Iowa	Nicole Kelly	Keokuk	23	Vocal			Born without left forearm
Kansas	Theresa Vail	Manhattan	22	Vocal	Top 10	America's Choice	Section leader in the Kansas Army National Guard Medical Detachment First Miss America contestant to display tattoos during the swimsuit portion of the competition
Kentucky	Jenna Day	Louisville	21	Vocal	Top 15		Top 10 at National Sweetheart 2011 pageant
Louisiana	Jaden Leach	West Monroe	20	Vocal		Non-finalist Talent Award	
Maine	Kristin Korda	Saco	21	Vocal		Non-finalist Talent Award	Previously Miss Maine's Outstanding Teen 2009
Maryland	Christina Denny	Owings Mills	22	Vocal	Top 10		Later Miss Maryland USA 2016
Massachusetts	Amanda Narciso	Taunton	22	Dance			2nd runner-up at National Sweetheart 2011 pageant
Michigan	Haley Williams	Saline	20	Baton Twirling		Quality of Life Award	Previously Miss Michigan's Outstanding Teen 2009
Minnesota	Rebecca Yeh	Nisswa	20	Violin	4th runner-up	Preliminary Talent Award	
Mississippi	Chelsea Rick	Fulton	23	Vocal	Top 15	Preliminary Lifestyle & Fitness Award STEM Scholarship Award	
Missouri	Shelby Ringdahl	Columbia	21	Vocal	Top 12		
Montana	Sheridan Pope	Sidney	21	Tap Dance			
Nebraska	Jacee Pilkington	Minatare	21	Vocal			Previously Miss Nebraska's Outstanding Teen 2009
Nevada	Diana Sweeney	Mound House	19	Lyrical Dance			Contestant at National Sweetheart 2012 pageant
New Hampshire	Samantha Russo	Nashua	22	Vocal		Non-finalist Talent Award Preliminary Talent Award	
New Jersey	Cara McCollum	Forrest City, AR	21	Piano			
New Mexico	Alexis Duprey	Las Cruces	22	Vocal		Non-finalist Interview Award	Previously Miss New Mexico Teen USA 2009
(New York (state)) New York	Nina Davuluri	Fayetteville	24	Bollywood Fusion Dance	Winner		First Indian American to win the title Previously Miss Michigan's Outstanding Teen 2006; 1st runner-up at Miss America's Outstanding Teen 2007 pageant
North Carolina	Johna Edmonds	Lumberton	24	Vocal			
North Dakota	Laura Harmon	Grand Forks	23	Vocal			Contestant at National Sweetheart 2011 pageant
Ohio	Heather Wells	Warren	23	Dance			
Oklahoma	Kelsey Griswold	Tulsa	20	Vocal	2nd runner-up	Preliminary Lifestyle & Fitness Award	
Oregon	Allison Cook	Klamath Falls	19	Violin			Later Miss Oregon USA 2021
Pennsylvania	Annie Rosellini	Butler	21	Lyrical Dance			Previously Miss Pennsylvania's Outstanding Teen 2005
Puerto Rico	Shenti Lauren	Barranquitas	24	African Folkloric Dance			
Rhode Island	Jessica Marfeo	Exeter	19	Vocal		Quality of Life Award 2nd runner-up	
South Carolina	Brooke Mosteller	Mount Pleasant	24	Vocal		CMN Miracle Maker Award Miss Congeniality (tie) Quality of Life Award 1st runner-up	
South Dakota	Tessa Dee	Mitchell	22	Gymnastics Dancing			Later Miss South Dakota USA 2017
Tennessee	Shelby Thompson	Franklin	23	Vocal			
Texas	Ivana Hall	Cedar Hill	23	Vocal	Top 10		Later Miss Oklahoma World 2015; Top 22 at Miss World America 2015 pageant
Utah	Ciera Pekarcik	Farmington	23	Vocal		Miss Congeniality (tie)	
Vermont	Jeanelle Achee	Rochester	22	Vocal			
(United States Virgin Islands) Virgin Islands	Ashley Massiah	Fredricksted	21	Majorette Dance			
Virginia	Desiree Williams	Newport News	24	Piano			Previously National Sweetheart 2012 Later Miss Virginia USA 2016 Contestant on Survivor: Heroes vs. Healers vs. Hustlers
(Washington (state)) Washington	Reina Almon	Yakima	21	Vocal			Previously Miss Washington's Outstanding Teen 2009 Contestant at National Sweetheart 2012 pageant
West Virginia	Miranda Harrison	Charleston	19	Vocal			
Wisconsin	Paula Mae Kuiper	Mount Pleasant	19	Piano	Top 12		
Wyoming	Rebecca Podio	Newcastle	23	Piano			Contestant at National Sweetheart 2012 pageant

== Video clips ==
- Groundbreaking Miss America Winner Miss New York Takes Home Pageant Crown – ABC News, September 16, 2013
- "After Defending Miss America From Racial Comments, George Takei Meets Nina Davuluri For First Time" – ABC News, September 18, 2013 (George Takei, Star Trek's Sulu).
- "Miss America 2014: How I Survived the Hate" – Bloomberg News, September 20, 2013.
- #StandWithNina: Duke Stands with Miss America – Duke University
