= Vonda Kay Van Dyke =

American model

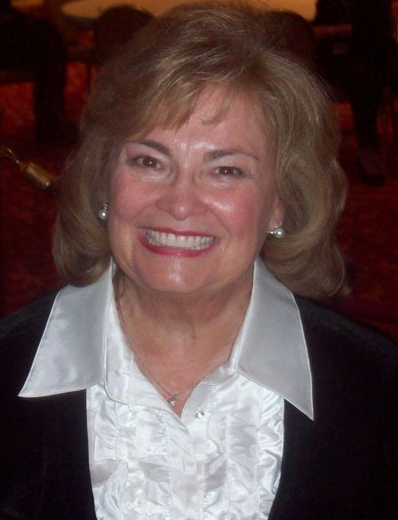
- Van Dyke in 2008
- Born: May 19, 1943 (age 83); Muskegon, Michigan
- Education: Northern Arizona University, graduated from UCLA
- Occupation: Author
- Title: Miss Phoenix 1964; Miss Arizona 1964; Miss America 1965
- Predecessor: Donna Axum
- Successor: Deborah Bryant
- Spouse: David Tyler Scoates
- Children: 1

Vonda Kay Van Dyke (born May 19, 1943) is an American beauty pageant titleholder who was crowned the 1965 Miss America on September 13, 1964. Earlier in the year, she had taken a break as a 21-year-old junior at Arizona State College at Flagstaff (since 1966, Northern Arizona University) to become Miss Arizona. She is unique among pageant winners in that she was and still is the only Miss America who was also Miss Congeniality.

== Early life and education ==
Van Dyke was born in Muskegon, Michigan. Her father, Dr. A.B. Van Dyke, was an osteopath. The family moved to Phoenix, the seat of Maricopa County, Arizona, where she attended the Phoenix Christian Junior/Senior High School.

== Pageantry ==
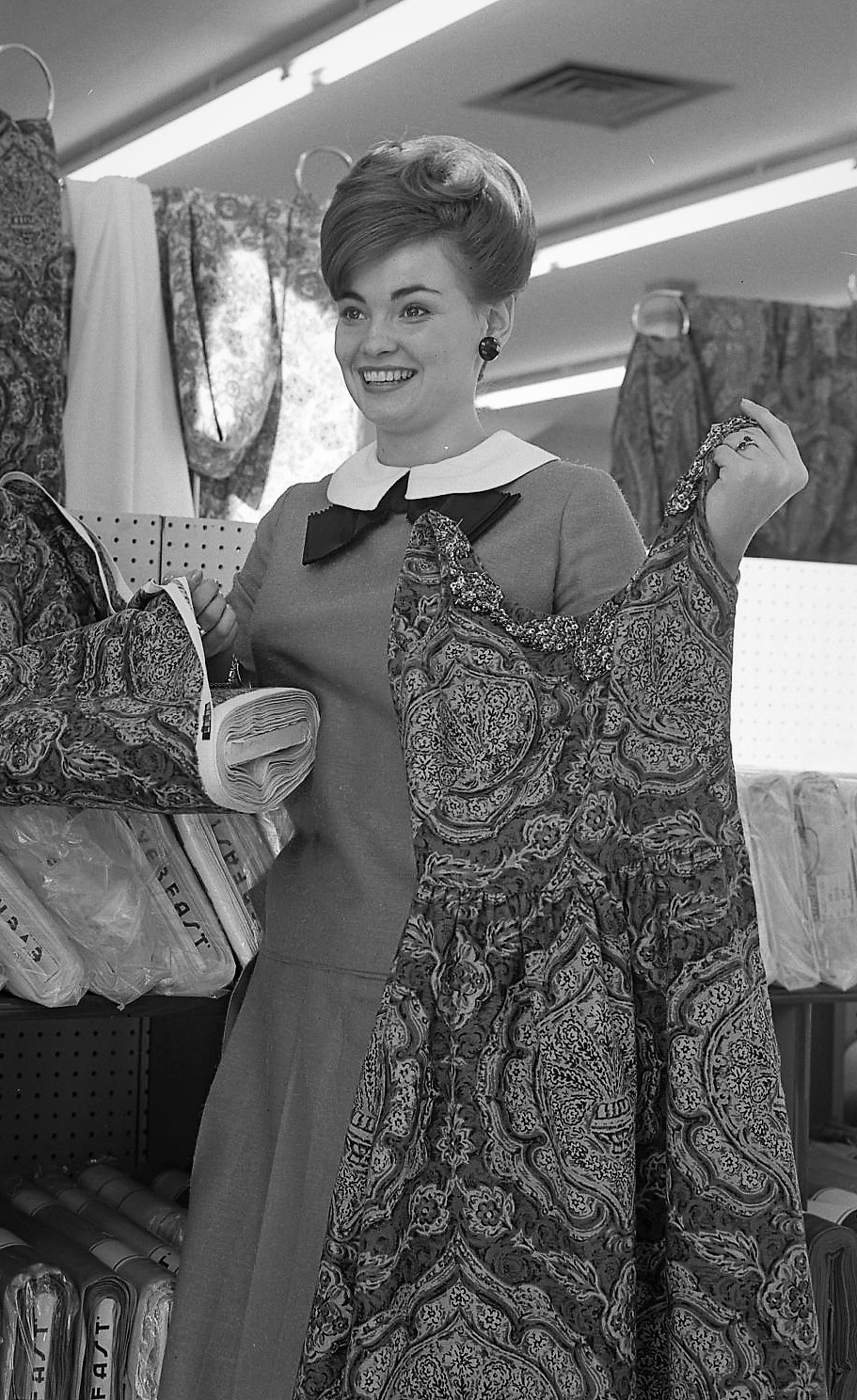
Van Dyke at a fabric store in Los Angeles, 1965

In her senior year she entered a local America's Junior Miss pageant, where she surprised the judges and her fellow competitors by performing ventriloquism as her talent, which she later honed at the Phoenix amusement park, Legend City. She was named Arizona's Junior Miss for 1961, and traveled with "Kurley-Q" to Mobile, Alabama, for the national finals, where she placed in the top ten.

Her next major pageant was the 1962 Miss Phoenix competition. She later won the Miss Tempe crown in 1964, then Miss Maricopa County, then Miss Arizona, and finally Miss America, where she was the first contestant to use ventriloquism in the talent competition. She subsequently urged Marcy Tigner to study ventriloquism, which Tigner would use for her Little Marcy evangelistic work.

== Career ==
During her reign as Miss America, Miss Van Dyke appeared on The Ed Sullivan Show, performing her ventriloquism act and demonstrating her singing skills, while sharing the stage with The Beach Boys, Robert Goulet, and Leslie Uggams. Van Dyke continued in the spotlight for some years after having relinquished her crown. In 1966 she wrote a Christian-themed teen advice book called That Girl in Your Mirror, in which she advised young women to become more beautiful by adopting "that inner sparkle that only Christ can give." She later wrote Dear Vonda Kay, which came out in 1967, and consisted of letters to Van Dyke and her replies. Van Dyke subsequently also recorded Here's Vonda Kay and some other albums of inspirational songs.

During the late 1960s and into the 1970s, Vonda worked with Archway Cookies, Inc. as spokeswoman. In 1974 she appeared in several Archway - Fort Wayne television commercials.

== Personal life ==
Van Dyke currently lives in Winter Park, Florida. She is the widow of David Tyler Scoates (October 26, 1934 – May 6, 2000), a minister formerly of Florida. She has one daughter, Vandy, from that marriage.

Awards and achievements
Preceded by Donna Axum	Miss America; 1965	Succeeded by Deborah Bryant
Preceded by Susan Bergstrom	Miss Arizona; 1964	Succeeded by Sandra Montgomery
