= Shawntel Smith =

American beauty pageant contestant (born 1971)

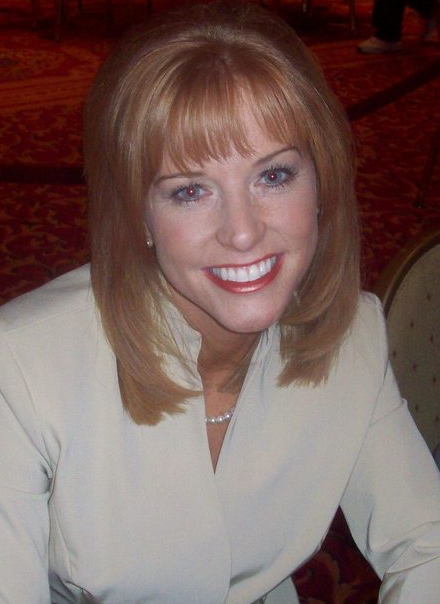
- Shawntel Smith signing autographs at the Miss America 2008 pageant
- Born: September 16, 1971 (age 55); Muldrow, Oklahoma
- Education: Muldrow High School; Northeastern State University; Oklahoma City University; Oral Roberts University
- Title: Miss Oklahoma 1995; Miss America 1996
- Predecessor: Heather Whitestone
- Successor: Tara Dawn Holland
- Spouse: Ryan Wuerch
- Children: 4

Shawntel Smith Wuerch (born September 16, 1971) is an American beauty pageant contestant, who was Miss America in 1996. She was born in Muldrow, Oklahoma. She attended Oklahoma City University.

== Personal life ==
Smith is married to tech executive, Ryan Wuerch. Together, Smith and her husband have 4 sons; Braden, Barrett, Brennan, and Bryson; 2 of which are from Wuerch's previous marriage. Wuerch was previously a board member for the Miss America Organization and is the co-founder and current CEO of DOSH, an, "app that puts money back into the pockets of consumers and businesses alike using breakthrough technology to eliminate wasted spending." In May 2017, DOSH and the Miss America Organization announced a sponsorship agreement.

Awards and achievements
Preceded by Heather Whitestone	Miss America; 1996	Succeeded by Tara Dawn Holland
Preceded by Tiffany Craig	Miss Oklahoma; 1995	Succeeded by Meighen Bradfield
