= Miss America 1998 =

71st edition of the Miss America competition

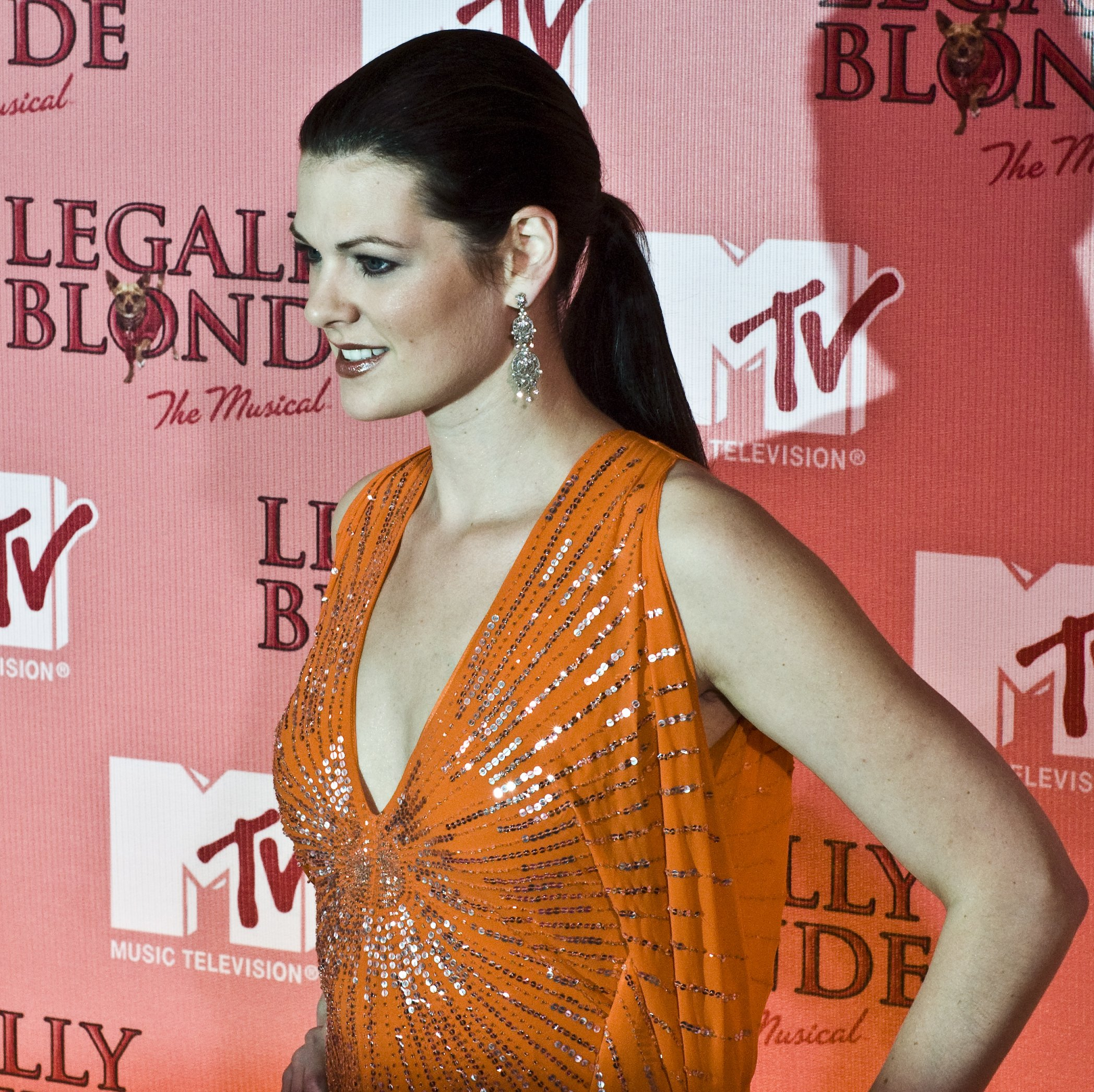
- Kate Shindle in 2007
- Date: September 13, 1997
- Presenters: John Callahan; Eva LaRue
- Venue: Boardwalk Hall, Atlantic City, New Jersey
- Broadcaster: ABC
- Winner: Katherine Shindle; Illinois

Miss America 1998, the 71st Miss America pageant, was held at the Boardwalk Hall in Atlantic City, New Jersey on Saturday, September 13, 1997 and was televised by the ABC Network. ABC replaced NBC as the pageant's television home.

== Results ==
=== Placements ===
| Placement | Contestant |
|---|---|
| Miss America 1998 | Katherine Shindle (Illinois) |
| 1st Runner-Up | Michelle Warren (North Carolina) |
| 2nd Runner-Up | Myra Barginear (Mississippi) |
| 3rd Runner-Up | Stacey Momeyer (Arizona) |
| 4th Runner-Up | [[|]] – Rebekah Keller (California) |
| Top 10 | Christy Neuman (Florida); Erika Kauffman (Hawaii); Mette Boving (Louisiana); Roxana Saberi (North Dakota)*; Tamara Ann Finch (Oregon) |

* Finalist Roxana Saberi entered the journalism field and made headlines in 2009 when she was imprisoned in Iran on charges of espionage; she was subsequently released.
