= Miss Florida's Teen =

US State beauty pageant

- Formation: 2004
- Type: Beauty pageant
- Headquarters: Lakeland
- Location: Florida
- Members: Miss America's Teen
- Official language: English
- Key people: Keith Williams (Executive Director)
- Website: Official website

The Miss Florida's Teen competition is the competition that selects the representative for the U.S. state of Florida in the Miss America's Teen competition.

In January 2023, the official name of the pageant was changed from Miss Florida's Outstanding Teen, to Miss Florida's Teen, in accordance with the national pageant.

Sheridan Delegal of Atlantic Beach was crowned Miss Florida's Teen on June 27, 2026, at the RP Funding Center's Youkey Theatre in Lakeland, Florida. She competed for the title of Miss America's Teen 2027 on September 5, 2026, at the Kravis Center for the Performing Arts in West Palm Beach, Florida.

== Results summary ==
The following is a summary of the past results of Miss Florida's Outstanding Teen titleholders presented in the table below. The year in parentheses indicates year of the Miss America's Outstanding Teen competition in which the placement and/or award was garnered.

=== Placements ===
- Miss America's Teen: Elizabeth Fechtel (2012), Leah Sykes (2014)
- 2nd runners-up: Myrrhanda Jones (2010)
- 3rd runners-up: Sierra Minott (2006), Anjelica Jones (2017)
- Top 9: Reece Weaver (2018)
- Top 10: Alexandra Milbrath (2008)
- Top 11: Anna-Katherine Risalvato (2024)
- Top 12: Michaela McLean (2015), Jessica Sales (2019)

=== Awards ===
==== Preliminary awards ====
- Preliminary Fitness: Anna-Katherine Risalvato (2024)
- Preliminary Evening Wear/On Stage Question: Sierra Minott (2006), Myrrhanda Jones (2010)
- Preliminary Talent: Anjelica Jones (2017), Anna-Katherine Risalvato (2024)

==== Other awards ====
- Miss Photogenic: Mary Katherine Fechtel (2011)
- Outstanding Dance Award: Michaela McLean (2015), Anjelica Jones (2017), Reece Weaver (2018)
- Non-finalist Talent Award: Mary Katherine Fechtel (2011)
- Teens in Action Award Winners: Hannah Adams (2020)
- Teens in Action Award Finalists: Leah Roddenberry (2016), Ruby Tilghman (2022), Noelle Schnacky (2026)
- Overall Dance Award: Jessica Sales (2019)

== Winners ==
- Declared as Winner
- Ended as a runner-up
- Ended as a finalist or semi-finalist

Year	Name	Hometown	Age	Local title	Talent	Placement at MAO Teen	Special scholarships at MAO Teen	Notes
2026	Sheridan Delegal	Atlantic Beach	18	Miss First Coast’s Teen	Irish Dance			
2025	Noelle Schnacky	Orlando	18	Miss Orlando's Teen	Lyrical Dance		Teens in Action Finalist	
2024	Ireland Harkins	St. Augustine	18	Miss St.Augustine's Teen	Tap Dance			Miss First Coast 2026
2023	Anna-Katherine Risalvato	Panama City Beach	18	Miss Gainesville's Teen	Dance	Top 11	Preliminary Fitness Award Preliminary Talent Award	
2022	Aashna Shah	Wekiva Springs	15	Miss Wekiva Springs' Outstanding Teen	Dance			
2021	Ruby Tilghman	Panama City	17	Miss Winter Park's Outstanding Teen	Broadway Vocal, "Finding Wonderland"		Teens in Action Finalist	Later Miss Alabama 2026
2019-20	Hannah Adams	Jacksonville	15	Miss Orlando's Outstanding Teen	Contemporary Pointe Dance, Queen Medley		Teens in Action Award Winner	Older sister of Miss Alabama's Outstanding Teen 2022, Hailey Adams. Top 12 at Miss Alabama 2022. Third Runner Up at Miss Alabama 2023. Fourth Runner Up at Miss Alabama 2024. First Runner Up at Miss Alabama 2025. Miss Shelby County (AL) 2026. Miss Mobile Bay 2024
2018	Jessica Sales	Orlando	17	Miss Orlando's Outstanding Teen	Contemporary Clogging, "Boogie Shoes"	Top 12	Overall Dance Award	1st Runner-Up at Miss Tennessee's Outstanding Teen 2017 Pageant.
2017	Reece Weaver	Jacksonville	15	Miss Jacksonville's Outstanding Teen	Acrobatic Jazz Dance, “Don't Cry for Me Argentina” from Evita	Top 9	Outstanding Dance Award	Dallas Cowboys Cheerleader 2023-present
2016	Anjelica Jones	Jacksonville	16	Miss Orlando's Outstanding Teen	Contemporary Ballet	3rd runner-up	Outstanding Dance Award Preliminary Talent Award	First Runner-Up at Miss Florida 2025. Miss City of Beautiful 2026. Jacksonville Jaguars Cheerleader.
2015	Leah Roddenberry	Bradenton	16	Miss Orlando's Outstanding Teen	Dance		Teens in Action Award Finalist	First to hold a state MAO Teen title twice 1st runner-up at Miss Florida 2019 competition Later Miss Florida 2021
2014	Michaela McLean	Clermont	17	Miss Winter Garden's Outstanding Teen	Dance	Top 12	Outstanding Dance Award	Later Miss Florida 2019
2013	Leah Roddenberry	Bradenton	14	Miss North Florida's Outstanding Teen	Dance	N/A		Assumed title when Sykes was named Miss America's Outstanding Teen 2014
2013	Leah Sykes	Jacksonville	16	Miss River City's Outstanding Teen	Vocal, "Someone Like You" by Adele	Winner		
2012	Jennifer Stehlin	Jacksonville	17	Miss St. Johns County's Outstanding Teen				
2011	Rachel Strever	Winter Springs	16	Miss City Beautiful's Outstanding Teen		N/A		Assumed title when Fechtel was named Miss America's Outstanding Teen 2012
2011	Elizabeth Fechtel	Leesburg	17	Miss Orlando's Outstanding Teen	Musical Theater Jazz Dance, "I Am What I Am"	Winner	Preliminary Evening Wear/OSQ Award	Sister of Miss Florida's Outstanding Teen 2010 and Miss Florida 2015, Mary Katherine Fechtel Miss Florida 2014 title revoked after a tabulation error that resulted in Fecthel being named the winner was corrected
2010	Mary Katherine Fechtel	Leesburg	14	Miss Orlando's Outstanding Teen	Dance		Non-finalist Talent Award Miss Photogenic	Sister of Miss Florida's Outstanding Teen 2011 and Miss America's Outstanding Teen 2012, Elizabeth Fechtel Later Miss Florida 2015
2009	Myrrhanda Jones	Gainesville	16	Miss Gainesville's Outstanding Teen	Twirl/Dance	2nd runner-up	Preliminary Evening Wear/OSQ Award	Later Miss Florida 2013; 3rd runner-up at Miss America 2014 pageant
2008	Courtney Sexton	Starke	15	Miss St. Augustine's Outstanding Teen	Dance			Later Miss Florida 2016
2007	Alexandra Milbrath	Winter Park	15	Miss City Beautiful's Outstanding Teen		Top 10		
2006	Sydney Keister	Jacksonville	17	Miss Jacksonville's Outstanding Teen				Later 4th runner-up at Miss Florida 2013
2005	Sierra Minott	Fort Myers	17	Miss Southwest Florida's Outstanding Teen	Musical Theatre Jazz Dance, “Life of the Party”	3rd runner-up	Preliminary Evening Wear/OSQ Award	Later Miss Florida 2008; 4th runner-up at Miss America 2009 pageant
2004	Ashton Kunkle			Miss Teen North Miami		No national pageant		
