= Miss America 1996 =

69th edition of the Miss America competition

- Date: September 16, 1995
- Presenters: Regis Philbin; Kathie Lee Gifford
- Venue: Boardwalk Hall, Atlantic City, New Jersey
- Broadcaster: NBC
- Winner: Shawntel Smith; Oklahoma

Miss America 1996, the 69th Miss America pageant, was held at the Boardwalk Hall in Atlantic City, New Jersey on Saturday, September 16, 1995, and was televised by the NBC Network.

== Results ==
=== Placements ===
Placement	Contestant
Miss America 1996	Shawntel Smith (Oklahoma)
1st Runner-Up	Emily John Orton (Oregon)
2nd Runner-Up	Paula Gaye Montgomery (Arkansas)
3rd Runner-Up	Tiffany Stoker (California)
4th Runner-Up	Tracy Kathleen Hayes (Illinois)
Top 10	Leigh Sherer (Alabama); Amy Beth Keller (Kansas); Marcia Turner (Massachusetts); Monica Louwerens (Mississippi); Helen Louise Goldsby (New York)
