= Theresa Vail =

American model (born 1990)

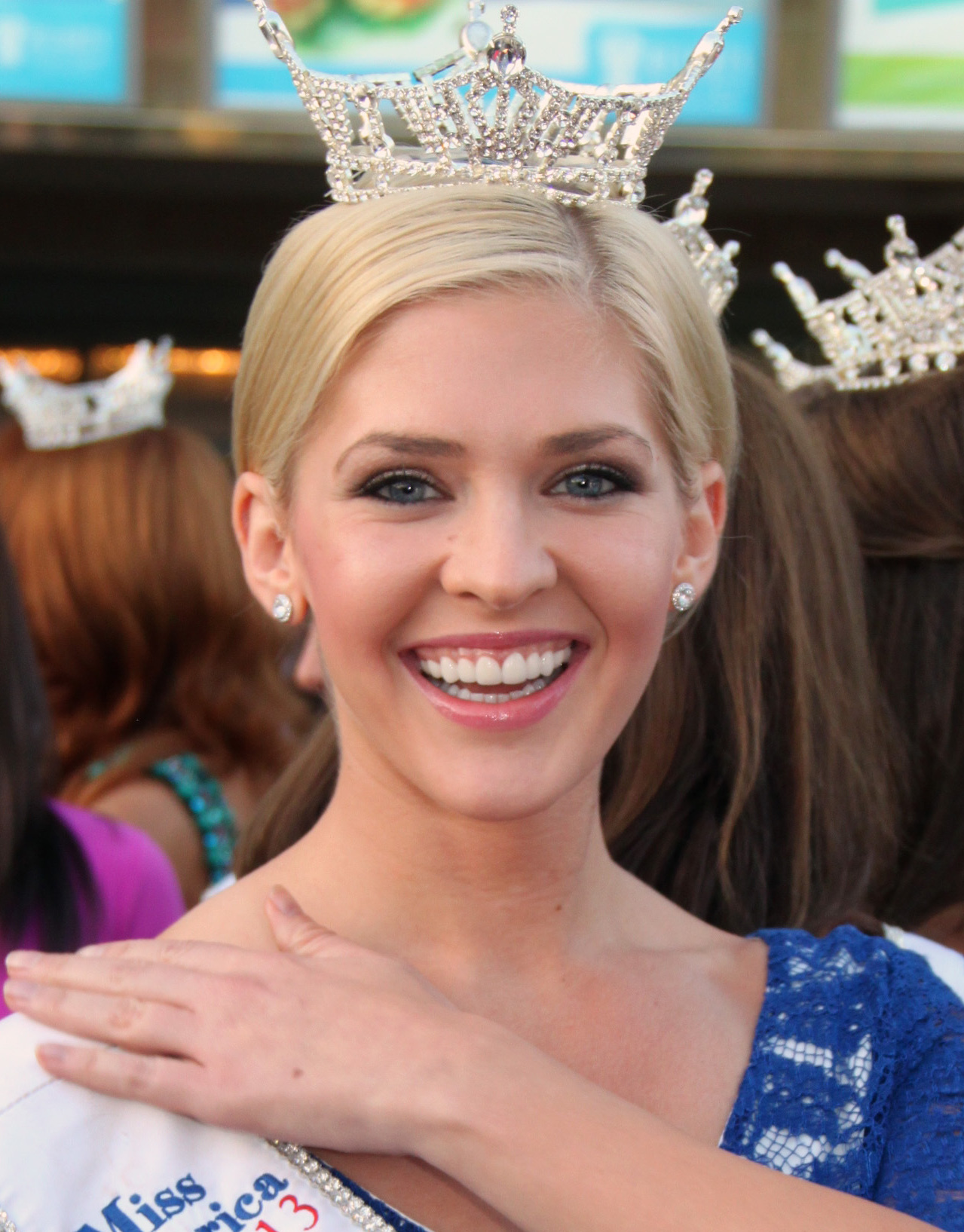
- Vail at Miss America 2013
- Born: October 1, 1990 (age 36); Manhattan, Kansas, U.S.
- Education: Leavenworth High School; Kansas State University; University of Kansas School of Medicine
- Known for: First contestant to display tattoos in the Miss America pageant
- Title: "America's Choice" and Top 10, Miss America 2014; Miss Kansas 2013
- Awards: Interview Award; Miss Kansas 2013; Talent Award; Miss Kansas 2013; Lifestyle and Fitness Award; Miss Kansas 2013; Top 5 Interview; Miss America 2014; Top 10; Miss America 2014; America's Choice Award; Miss America 2014
- Military career
- Allegiance: United States of America
- Branch: United States Army
- Service years: 2007–present
- Rank: Sergeant

Theresa Marie Vail (born October 1, 1990) is Miss Kansas 2013. She subsequently placed in the top ten of the Miss America 2014 pageant, where she became the first contestant to openly display tattoos (during the swimsuit competition) and won the "America's Choice" award. Vail later hosted programs for the Outdoor Channel.

== Background ==
Vail graduated in 2009 from Leavenworth High School, Leavenworth, Kansas. She began her education at Kansas State University in 2009, before taking a leave of absence when she became Miss Kansas in 2013. After finishing her year as Miss Kansas, and briefly hosting programs for the Outdoor Channel, Vail returned to Kansas State where she completed her B.A. in Psychology in 2016, a second B.S. in chemistry, and a master's degree in Psychology in 2018. She planned to begin medical school at the University of Kansas School of Medicine in the summer of 2018.

Vail is a mechanic and section leader in the Kansas Army National Guard Medical Detachment.

== Pageants ==
Vail competed in the Miss Leavenworth County Pageant in 2012, one of the local competitions a titleholder must win in order to move on to Miss Kansas. As she considered archery to be her skill, she had assumed that this is what she would do for the talent portion of the competition. A few days before preparing to compete, however, she found out that "projectile objects were forbidden" and that she had to choose a new talent or drop out of the competition. Vail began to search "YouTube for opera songs to perform" because she felt that she "couldn't sing anything contemporary" and might as well go big or go home. From this search, she chose to sing the aria "Nessun dorma." Vail states that she had "never sung opera in my life [...] I had an appreciation for it [...] and I sang soprano in choir back in high school, but I hadn't sung since then and certainly never opera."

After winning Miss Leavenworth County, she went on to compete and win the Miss Kansas title on June 8, 2013.

She next competed (as Miss Kansas) in the Miss America 2014 contest with the platform "Empowering Women: Overcoming Stereotypes and Breaking Barriers." This was inspired by the way that outdoor sports with her father helped her to overcome being bullied as a child: "I was bullied when I was a kid. It got so bad that I nearly took my own life... My dad [an Army dentist stationed in Germany] started taking me hunting with him and it saved my life." Vail stated that her primary goal at the Miss America pageant was to set an example, stating in a Twitter message: "Win or not tonight, I have accomplished what I set out to do. I have empowered women. I have opened eyes." She further commented that one of her goals was to break stereotypes.

The Miss America Pageant began with her win of the "America's Choice," award, which automatically positioned her as one of the 15 semifinalists. Vail then passed the swimsuit competition, in which she became the first Miss America contestant to openly display tattoos, one being the Serenity Prayer along the right side of her torso. She then placed into the Top 10, after passing the evening gown portion of the contest. Vail was eliminated from the pageant, however, after the talent portion in which she performed the aria "Nessun Dorma", and did not make it into the Top 5. Both Kansas journalist Diana Reese (in The Washington Post) and Lisa Gutierrez (in The Wichita Eagle ) focused on Vail's lack of formal training as an opera singer, rather than her tattoos, as the reason why she was not chosen for the top five.

Though she did not win the Miss America crown, Vail said that she enjoyed the experience. In an interview the day after the Miss America contest, she stated that she had become good friends with the winner, Miss New York, Nina Davuluri, and felt "very confident in her ability to do the job." Despite this fact, there was a backlash of xenophobic and racist comments in social media against Davuluri shortly after she was crowned Miss America 2014 that invoked images of, and comparisons with, Vail. Vail denounced this response on her blog and in interviews.

Vail continued to serve as Miss Kansas until she was succeeded by Amanda Sasek in 2014.

== Outdoor Channel ==
Vail began to host Limitless with Theresa Vail for the Outdoor Channel in July 2015.

On May 26, 2015, while filming an episode for the show near Holy Cross, Alaska, an incident occurred when Vail was with master guide Michael Wade Renfro, and assistant guide Joseph Andrew Miller of Renfro's Alaska Adventures. According to the Associated Press, "The hunting party spotted the bear and sow, and at Miller's direction, Vail fired at the bear. At his command she chambered another round, fired a second shot and hit the sow. Both bears died. According to prosecutors, Miller contacted Renfro, and a collective decision was made to obtain a second grizzly bear tag. Renfro, according to the criminal complaint, packed the second tag in a bag, flew over the group and dropped it out of a Piper PA-18 airplane. Miller attached the invalid tag to the second bear. Vail signed the second bear tag and backdated it to May 26.... Renfro and Miller as guides are required to contact authorities to report illegally taken game, according to the complaint. The film crew reported June 3 to Alaska Wildlife Troopers what had happened." The three were subsequently charged with misdemeanors. At a change of plea hearing on 1/6/16 in Aniak, Alaska, Vail pleaded guilty and agreed to testify against her Alaskan guides....

Vail subsequently left Limitless with Theresa Vail and began to host another program for the Outdoor Channel, NRA All Access, in early 2016, which she continued until starting medical school.

Awards and achievements
Preceded by Sloane Lewis	Miss Kansas; 2013	Succeeded by Amanda Sasek
