= Kristina Janolo =

American beauty pageant titleholder

- Born: February 20, 1987 (age 39); Kissimmee, Florida, U.S.
- Education: Bishop Moore Catholic High School; University of Central Florida
- Beauty pageant titleholder
- Title: Miss Winter Park 2011; Miss Florida 2011
- Major competition: Miss America 2012 (Top 13)
- Website: Kristina Janolo on X

Kristina Janolo (born February 20, 1987) is an American beauty pageant titleholder from Kissimmee, Florida, who was named Miss Florida 2011. She represented Florida in the 2012 Miss America pageant, where she reached the top 13. She is the first Filipino-American winner for the Miss Florida title.

Janolo studied at the University of Central Florida, where she majored in marketing. She also graduated from Bishop Moore Catholic High School in Orlando Florida, where her younger sister, Samantha attended. She is UCF's fourth Miss Florida winner, after Ericka Dunlap in 2003 who went on to be crowned Miss America 2004, Rachael Todd in 2009, and Jaclyn Raulerson in 2010.

Awards and achievements
Preceded by Jaclyn Raulerson	Miss Florida; 2011	Succeeded by Laura McKeeman
