= 2006 Ford 400 =

Race details
- Race 36 of 36 in the 2006 NASCAR Nextel Cup Series
- The 2006 Ford 400 program cover.
- Date: November 19, 2006
- Location: Homestead-Miami Speedway, Homestead, Florida
- Course: Permanent racing facility
- Course length: 1.5 miles (2.4 km)
- Distance: 268 laps, 402 mi (646.956 km)
- Scheduled distance: 267 laps, 400.5 mi (644.542 km)
- Weather: Temperatures up to 71.6 °F (22.0 °C); wind speeds up to 12 miles per hour (19 km/h)
- Average speed: 125.375 miles per hour (201.772 km/h)
- Attendance: 80,000

Pole position
Driver	Kasey Kahne	Evernham Motorsports
- Time: 30.293

Most laps led
Driver	Kasey Kahne	Evernham Motorsports
- Laps: 90

Winner
No. 16	Greg Biffle	Roush Racing

Television in the United States
- Network: NBC
- Announcers: Bill Weber, Benny Parsons, and Wally Dallenbach Jr.
- Nielsen ratings: 4.7/9 (Final); 4.3/7 (Overnight)

The 2006 Ford 400 was the thirty-sixth stock car race of the 2006 NASCAR Nextel Cup Series, and the final round of the ten-race season-ending Chase for the Nextel Cup. It was held on November 19, 2006, in Homestead, Florida, at Homestead–Miami Speedway, before a crowd of 80,000 people. The circuit is an intermediate track that holds NASCAR races. Roush Racing's Greg Biffle won the 267-lap race from the 22nd position. Dale Earnhardt, Inc.'s Martin Truex Jr. finished second and Joe Gibbs Racing's Denny Hamlin was third. This race was the final race with Benny Parsons in the broadcasting booth, since he died from lung cancer in January 2007.

Kasey Kahne won his 12th career pole position by recording the quickest qualifying lap, and he led the first 18 laps before Kyle Busch passed him. He retook first on the 47th lap and led for 90 laps, more than any other driver. Dale Earnhardt Jr. took the lead after not making a pit stop during a caution period and held it until Truex took the lead after Earnhardt had a lengthy pit stop due to a lug nut problem. Biffle took the lead from Riggs, only to lose it to J. J. Yeley during the pit stop rotation, before passing him with twelve laps remaining to win his second race of the season and eleventh of his career. During the race, there were eleven cautions and fifteen lead changes among ten drivers.

The race resulted in Jimmie Johnson, the pre-race points leader, winning his first NASCAR Nextel Cup Series Drivers' Championship by 56 points lead over his nearest opponent, Matt Kenseth. Hamlin finished third to end the season as the highest-placed rookie. Chevrolet finished the Manufacturers' Championship with 279 points, 76 more than Dodge and another point ahead of Ford.

== Background ==
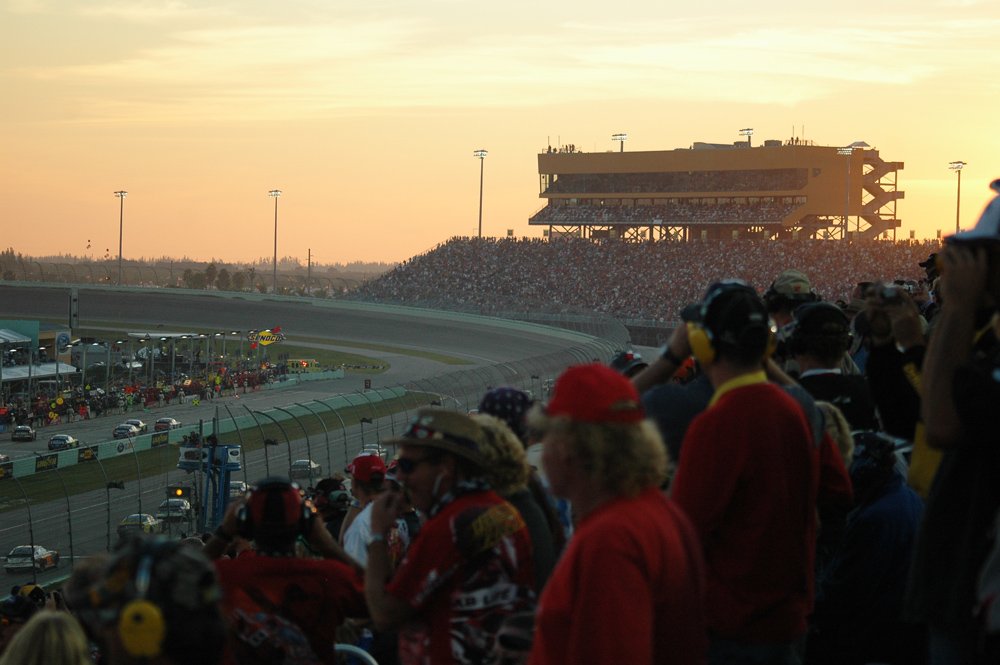
Homestead–Miami Speedway, where the race was held

The layout of Homestead–Miami Speedway.

The Ford 400 was the 36th of 36 scheduled stock car races of the 2006 NASCAR Nextel Cup Series, and the final round of the ten-race season-ending 2006 Chase for the Nextel Cup. It was held on November 19, 2006, in Homestead, Florida, at Homestead–Miami Speedway, an intermediate track that holds NASCAR races. The race was held on Homestead–Miami Speedway's standard track; a 1.5 mi (2.4 km) four-turn oval track. The track's turns are banked from 18 to 20 degrees, while both the front stretch, the location of the finish line, and the back stretch are banked at three degrees.

Before the race, Jimmie Johnson led the Drivers' Championship with 6,332 points, followed by Matt Kenseth. Denny Hamlin and Kevin Harvick tied for third and Dale Earnhardt Jr. completed the top five drivers competing for the 2006 Chase for the Nextel Cup. The final race had a maximum of 195 points available, which meant Kenseth could still win the championship. Johnson had to finish twelfth to become champion because even if Kenseth won, Johnson would still be ahead of him. If Kenseth won and he and Johnson were tied on points, both drivers would have five victories, but Johnson would be the champion because he had more second-place finishes than Kenseth. Jeff Gordon, Jeff Burton, Mark Martin, Kasey Kahne completed the top ten. Chevrolet had already secured the Manufacturers' Championship, and entered the race on 273 points; Dodge was second with 199, followed by Ford with 193. Greg Biffle was the race's defending champion.

Johnson, the 2004 championship runner-up, had been second in points entering the past three races at Homestead, and stated his strategy was to finish ahead of his competitors. "I can't express enough how much experience in this sport has helped me as a driver. My fifth year, fifth time being in a championship situation. We've been under pressure and we've been in this situation and we are a better, stronger, more mature race team from it. I think the last few months, we've been able to show that." Kenseth stated that his only chance of winning his second championship was if Johnson did not finish, and he was pessimistic given his recent poor performance, "He's going to have to have problems, and we're going to have to have a lot of good luck to get in there. We can't do it on performance. We can't run 25th on performance right now."

Two drivers made their first attempts to qualify for a race this season. After leaving Formula One in July 2006, Juan Pablo Montoya partook in the Ford 400 for Chip Ganassi Racing in its No. 30 car as preparation for his full-time Nextel Cup Series debut for the 2007 season after team owner Chip Ganassi filed an additional entry for the event. Brewco Motorsports kept Busch Series driver Casey Atwood for Homestead, hoping to qualify for the team's second Nextel Cup Series race, and Atwood's first since racing for Evernham Motorsports in the 2003 season.

== Practice and qualifying ==
Three practice sessions were held before the Sunday race; one on Friday and two on Saturday. The first session lasted 90 minutes, the second 60 minutes and the third 35 minutes. Kurt Busch was fastest in the first practice session with a time of 30.366 seconds, ahead of Elliott Sadler in second, and David Stremme third. Burton, Biffle, Kahne, Brian Vickers, Ryan Newman, Martin, and Scott Riggs rounded out the session's top ten drivers. Dale Jarrett crashed into a trackside wall during the practice session. He used a backup car for the qualifying session later that day.

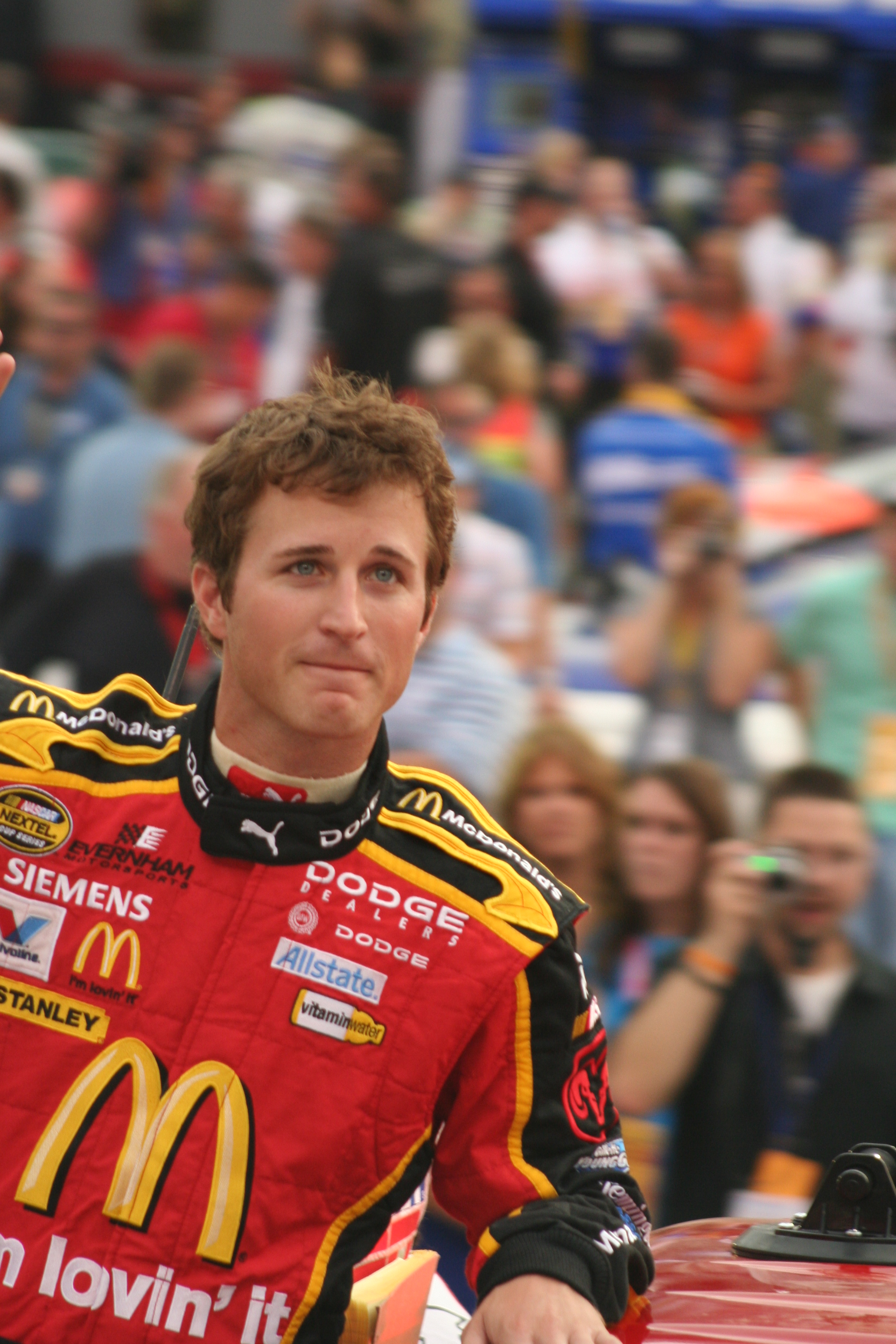
Kasey Kahne (pictured in 2007) had the twelfth pole position of his career.

On Friday afternoon, 56 cars entered the qualifier; NASCAR's qualifying procedure allowed 43 to race. Each driver ran two laps, with the starting order set by the competitor's fastest times. Morgan Shepherd withdrew from the race before qualifying because an accident in the first practice session caused irreparable structural damage to his car. Kahne took his sixth pole position of the season, and the 12th of his career with a time of 30.293 seconds, equalling Kurt Busch's total of pole positions won in 2006. He was joined on the grid's front row by Riggs, his Evernham Motorsports teammate, who was 0.007 seconds slower. Kyle Busch, Sadler, Burton, Vickers, Harvick, J. J. Yeley, David Gilliland, and Clint Bowyer completed the top ten starters. Johnson, a Chase for the Nextel Cup driver, qualified 13th, while Kenseth, another chase driver, set the 19th-fastest lap. 43rd-placed qualifier Bill Elliott used a champion's provisional to qualify for the race. On his second lap, Robby Gordon's engine failed, and he changed engines. The twelve drivers who failed to qualify were Ward Burton, Brandon Whitt, Atwood, Kenny Wallace, Todd Kluever, David Ragan, Michael Waltrip, Mike Skinner, Derrike Cope, Kevin Lepage, Carl Long, and Chad Chaffin. After qualifying, Kahne said, "The engine package we brought here is very strong and the Dodge Chargers are working well. We'll see what happens, but it's pretty nice to have all three cars up front."

Casey Mears was fastest with a 31.317-second lap in the second practice session on Saturday afternoon. Harvick set the second-quickest lap time and Newman was third. Burton, Scott Wimmer, Kyle Busch, Kahne, Bowyer, Vickers, and Johnson occupied positions four through ten. Hamlin was the highest-placed Chase driver outside of the top ten in 12th, and Earnhardt was 19th-fastest. At the end of the second practice session, Travis Kvapil's engine failed. Later that day, Burton paced the final practice session with a lap of 31.229 seconds; Newman improved his performance for second, Kahne third, Martin fourth, Kenseth fifth, and his championship rival Johnson sixth. Hamlin placed seventh, Robby Gordon eighth, Mears ninth, and Dave Blaney tenth.

=== Qualifying results ===
Grid	Car	Driver	Team	Manufacturer	Time	Speed
1	9	Kasey Kahne	Evernham Motorsports	Dodge	30.293	178.259
2	10	Scott Riggs	Evernham Motorsports	Dodge	30.300	178.218
3	5	Kyle Busch	Hendrick Motorsports	Chevrolet	30.317	178.118
4	19	Elliott Sadler	Evernham Motorsports	Dodge	30.327	178.059
5	31	Jeff Burton	Richard Childress Racing	Chevrolet	30.340	177.983
6	25	Brian Vickers	Hendrick Motorsports	Chevrolet	30.459	177.288
7	29	Kevin Harvick	Richard Childress Racing	Chevrolet	30.462	177.270
8	18	J. J. Yeley	Joe Gibbs Racing	Chevrolet	30.494	177.084
9	38	David Gilliland	Robert Yates Racing	Ford	30.507	177.009
10	07	Clint Bowyer	Richard Childress Racing	Chevrolet	30.518^{1}	176.945
11	41	Reed Sorenson	Chip Ganassi Racing	Dodge	30.529	176.881
12	24	Jeff Gordon	Hendrick Motorsports	Chevrolet	30.536	176.840
13	01	Joe Nemechek	Ginn Racing	Chevrolet	30.557	176.719
14	8	Dale Earnhardt Jr.	Dale Earnhardt, Inc.	Chevrolet	30.574	176.621
15	48	Jimmie Johnson	Hendrick Motorsports	Chevrolet	30.583	176.569
16	12	Ryan Newman	Penske Racing South	Dodge	30.594	176.505
17	49	Mike Bliss	BAM Racing	Dodge	30.613	176.396
18	14	Sterling Marlin	MB2 Motorsports	Chevrolet	30.615	176.384
19	17	Matt Kenseth	Roush Racing	Ford	30.622	176.344
20	1	Martin Truex Jr.	Dale Earnhardt, Inc.	Chevrolet	30.631	176.292
21	20	Tony Stewart	Joe Gibbs Racing	Chevrolet	30.663	176.108
22	16	Greg Biffle	Roush Racing	Ford	30.679	176.016
23	40	David Stremme	Chip Ganassi Racing	Dodge	30.679	176.016
24	33	Scott Wimmer	Richard Childress Racing	Chevrolet	30.682	175.999
25	22	Dave Blaney	Bill Davis Racing	Dodge	30.689	175.959
26	6	Mark Martin	Roush Racing	Ford	30.703	175.879
27	66	Jeff Green	Haas CNC Racing	Chevrolet	30.715	175.810
28	15	Paul Menard	Dale Earnhardt, Inc.	Chevrolet	30.740	175.667
29	30	Juan Pablo Montoya	Chip Ganassi Racing	Dodge	30.755	175.581
30	43	Bobby Labonte	Petty Enterprises	Chevrolet	30.760	175.553
31	99	Carl Edwards	Roush Racing	Ford	30.768	175.507
32	09	Jeremy Mayfield	Phoenix Racing	Dodge	30.774	175.473
33	11	Denny Hamlin	Joe Gibbs Racing	Chevrolet	30.794	175.359
34	32	Travis Kvapil	PPI Motorsports	Chevrolet	30.801	175.319
35	7	Robby Gordon	Robby Gordon Motorsports	Chevrolet	30.812^{1}	175.256
36	2	Kurt Busch	Penske Racing South	Dodge	30.817	175.228
37	21	Ken Schrader	Wood Brothers Racing	Ford	30.818	175.222
38	45	Kyle Petty	Petty Enterprises	Dodge	30.864	174.961
39	42	Casey Mears	Chip Ganassi Racing	Dodge	30.955	174.447
40	96	Tony Raines	Hall of Fame Racing	Chevrolet	30.994	174.227
41	88	Dale Jarrett	Robert Yates Racing	Ford	31.084	173.723
42	26	Jamie McMurray	Roush Racing	Ford	31.087	173.706
43	00	Bill Elliott	Michael Waltrip Racing	Chevrolet	Champion's Provisional	
Failed to qualify
44	4	Ward Burton	Morgan-McClure Motorsports	Chevrolet	30.870	174.927
45	72	Brandon Whitt	CJM Racing	Chevrolet	30.943	174.514
46	95	Casey Atwood	Brewco Motorsports	Ford	30.982	174.295
47	78	Kenny Wallace	Furniture Row Racing	Chevrolet	31.002	174.182
48	06	Todd Kluever	Roush Racing	Ford	31.012	174.126
49	60	David Ragan	No Fear Racing	Ford	31.082	173.734
50	55	Michael Waltrip	Waltrip-Jasper Racing	Dodge	31.208	173.033
51	27	Mike Skinner	Kirk Shelmerdine Racing	Chevrolet	31.303	172.507
52	74	Derrike Cope	McGlynn Racing	Dodge	31.699	170.352
53	61	Kevin Lepage	Front Row Motorsports	Dodge	31.713	170.277
54	46	Carl Long	Cupp Motorsports	Dodge	31.878	169.396
55	34	Chad Chaffin	Front Row Motorsports	Dodge	32.181	167.801
^{1} Moved to the back of the grid for changing engines (#07, 7)

== Race ==
Live television coverage of the race began at 14:01 Eastern Standard Time (UTC+04:00) in the United States on NBC. Around the start of the race, weather conditions were clear with the air temperature at 70 °F (21 °C). Jenna Edwards, Miss Florida USA 2007, began pre-race ceremonies with an invocation. American Idol season five winner and blues rock singer Taylor Hicks performed the national anthem, and Ford board of directors member Edsel Ford II commanded the drivers to start their engines. During the pace laps, Bowyer and Robby Gordon moved to the back of the grid because of engine changes.

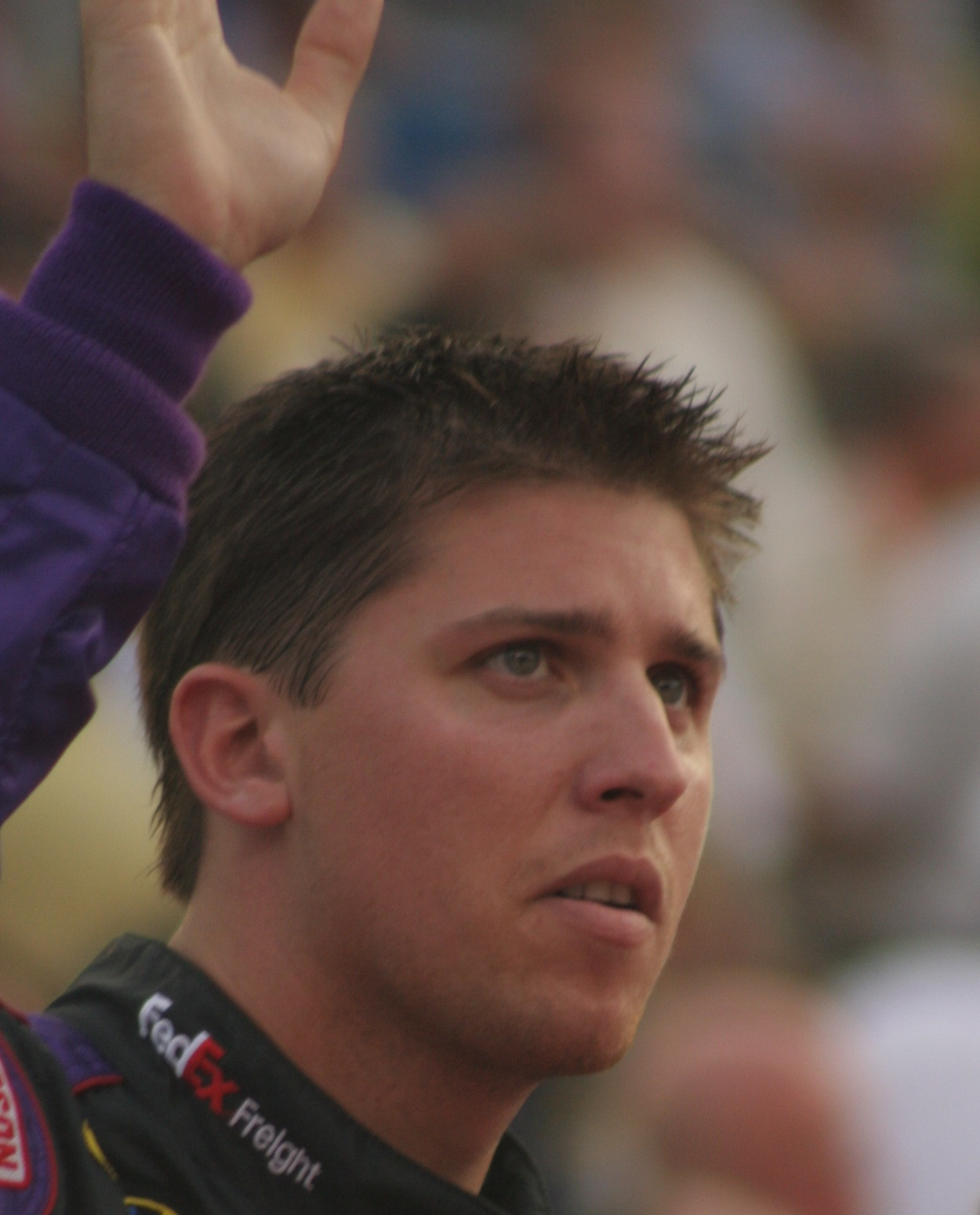
Denny Hamlin (pictured in 2007) finished the race in third to place in that position in the final points' standings.

The race commenced at 15:11 local time but one lap was deduced from its scheduled distance because NASCAR located debris on the track between the first and second corners. Kahne maintained the lead going into turn one. Kyle Busch passed Riggs for third, but the latter fell to fourth on lap two. Johnson advanced from 15th to eleventh by the start of the fifth lap. Two laps later, Kurt Busch made contact with the backstretch wall as he exited turn two, ricocheted off it, and Bobby Labonte collided with the rear of his car, resulting in the first caution. During the caution, 23 drivers made pit stops to make car adjustments. At the lap-12 restart, Kahne led his teammate Riggs, Burton, and Kyle Busch. Kyle Busch passed Riggs for second on the following lap. Two laps later, the second caution was shown: Kurt Busch lost control of his car after a flat tire caused him to strike the wall exiting turn four, littering debris. Under caution, more drivers made pit stops. Johnson had a frontal hole punctured by debris from Kurt Busch's car repaired.

At the lap 19 restart, Kahne was overtaken for the lead by Kyle Busch, and he then fell behind teammate Riggs for third. Montoya sustained a flat left front tire from made minor contact with Mears and Earnhardt on lap 22. Kyle Busch led Riggs by 0.170 seconds by lap 30, as Johnson advanced to 26th after restarting 40th. Johnson had further advanced to 20th place by lap 40. Five laps later, a spring rubber was located on the backstretch groove, prompting the third caution. During the caution, the leaders (including Kyle Busch), made pit stops for car adjustments. At the lap 50-restart, Kahne led the field to racing speed. He extended his lead over Kyle Busch to 0.994 seconds by the 65th lap. Johnson got into tenth on lap 79, and he overtook Harvick for ninth on the lap after a short battle. On lap 94, Earnhardt moved into sixth place, and he then passed Gilliland and Kenseth to advance into fourth. Green flag pit stops began on lap 104, and concluded on lap 109, with Kahne retaining the lead.

Kyle Busch got loose and hit a wall, losing some positions, before hitting the turn two wall with his car's right side on lap 116, resulting in the fourth caution. Several drivers, including Kahne, made pit stops for fuel and tires under caution. Earnhardt did not make a pit stop, and led at the lap-120 restart. Biffle passed Martin Truex Jr. for second 11 laps later, as Earnhardt pulled away from the rest of the field after repelling multiple challenges for the lead. Blaney's left rear tire burst on lap 160, scattering debris across the track, prompting the fifth caution. Multiple drivers (including Earnhardt) entered pit road for tire changes and car adjustments during the caution. Earnhardt had a slow stop because of a rear lug nut problem, and Truex led at the restart on lap 166. A sixth caution was issued as Gilliland struck the turn one wall. He then lost control of his car and crashed into a wall two corners later. Some cars made pit stops, but not the top 13 cars.

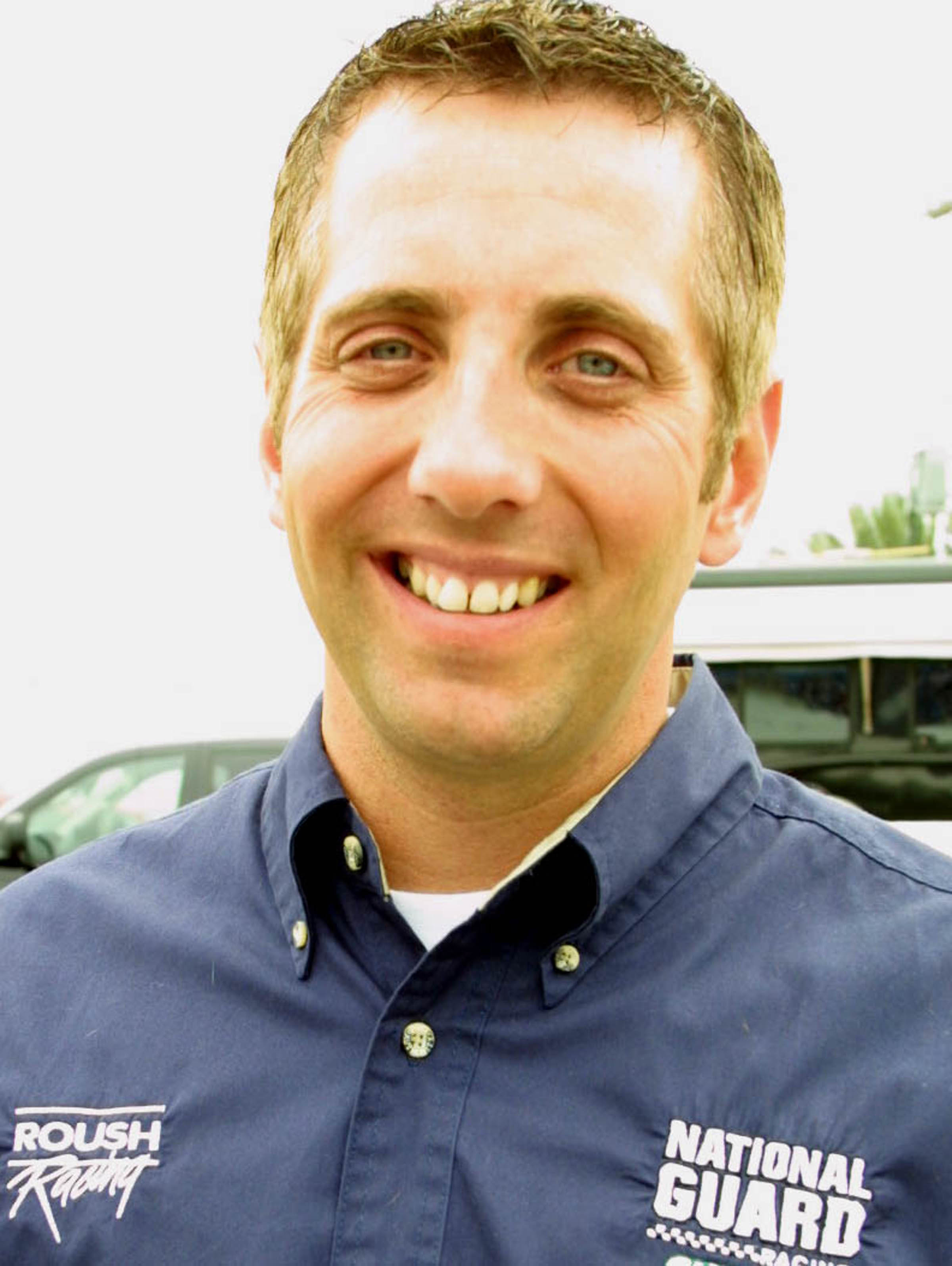
Greg Biffle (pictured in 2004) took his eleventh career win and his third straight at Homestead–Miami Speedway.

Racing continued on lap 179 as Truex led from Kahne, and Biffle. Johnson drew alongside Kenseth two laps later but was unable to pass for fifth. He was successful on the next lap until Kenseth retook the position on lap 183. Bowyer passed Johnson for sixth on that lap. On lap 188, Robby Gordon crashed exiting turn four and spun 360 degrees as Johnson steered left to avoid hitting him, bringing out the seventh caution. Under the caution, multiple drivers (including Truex), made pit stops for tires and car adjustments. Sadler did not make a pit stop and led at the lap-194 restart. Johnson dropped to 15th as several drivers began to prepare for several green flag laps on the 197th lap. Mike Bliss' engine failed on lap 206, laying oil on the track and causing the eighth caution. Several cars, including Sadler, entered pit road for tires and fuel. Kahne won the race off pit road to retake the lead for the lap 210 restart. Kahne's teammate Riggs overtook him at the start-finish line for the lead on the lap. The following lap, Riggs lost the lead to Kahne.

On laps 212 and 213, Biffle passed teammate Kenseth and Riggs to move to second. He overtook Kahne for the lead for the first time on the 214th lap. Earnhardt scraped the wall with his car's right side through turn two on lap 225, but continued in 12th. Johnson moved to eighth place by the 243rd lap, and did not require another pit stop. Lap 247 had the ninth caution; Newman's left-rear tire was cut from contact with Montoya, and he slid through some grass on the backstretch. The leaders (including Biffle) made pit stops for tires under caution. Yeley stayed on the track to lead at the lap 252 restart. That lap, Newman collided with Montoya's rear in turn one, causing the latter to strike the turn one wall and catch fire as he drifted toward the infield due to a ruptured fuel cell. Montoya was uninjured. A tenth caution was displayed for three laps, until race officials showed a red flag for 7 minutes, 58 seconds for track cleanup as cars stopped on the turn three banking.

Yeley led at the lap 257 restart, but was quickly passed by Biffle on the inside. On the following lap, Yeley lost second to Kahne. On the 259th lap, Johnson was passed by Harvick for seventh place, and Hamlin overtook Yeley for third. On lap 262, the 11th (and final) caution came out when Mears' engine failed, laying oil on the track. During the caution, Yeley stopped on the backstretch because his car had run out of fuel on the 265th lap. Biffle got the race back underway on the lap 267 restart. That lap, Kahne was passed by Truex for second. Biffle held the lead for the remaining two laps to take his second victory of the season, and the eleventh of his career. Truex finished second, Hamlin third, Kahne fourth, and Harvick fifth. Kenseth took sixth, Riggs came seventh, and Edwards placed eighth. Johnson finished ninth to win his first NASCAR Nextel Cup Series Championship. Bowyer completed the top ten finishers. There were fifteen lead changes among ten drivers during the race. Kahne led the most laps (90) of any driver. Biffle led twice for a total of 47 laps.

=== Post-race comments ===
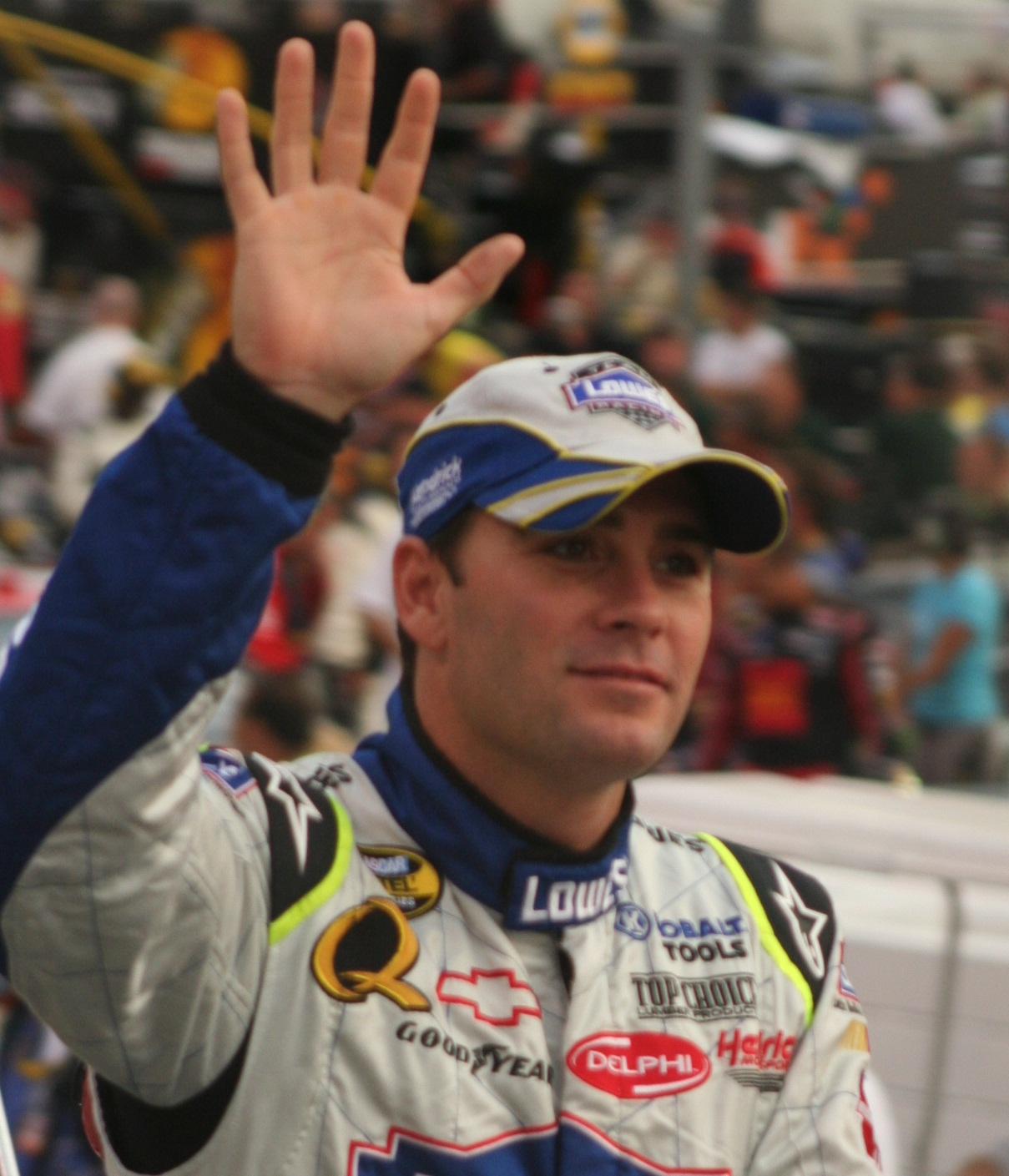
Jimmie Johnson (pictured in 2007) won his first Nextel Cup Series championship from his nearest rival Matt Kenseth.

Biffle appeared in victory lane to celebrate his second victory of the season in front of a crowd of 80,000 spectators; the win earned him $323,800. He said the victory made up for his season struggles and praised his car for assisting him in winning, "It does a lot for us, Everybody knows this has been a tough year for us. It seems like we haven't been in the right place at the right time and then haven't had fast enough race cars and have had mechanical failures." TTruex appreciated that his fast car allowed him to run strongly for most of the race, "It's been a pretty tough season. The last few months we've really come together and had some good runs and just to be able to close the deal, feels really good." Third-placed Hamlin was not upset about not winning the championship, "I figured we just fell back to fifth or sixth in points and who knows where we were going to end up, I was angry at the time, but I settled myself back down. It's been a great year for us," Hamlin said. "I'm ecstatic the way we ran. This is the way I wanted to end the year is with a top-five finish [because] these guys deserve it."

Afterward, Johnson began celebrating his first Nextel Cup Series championship. He said of his achievement, "I think we knew in our hearts we could do it all along, we just got into some bad luck at the beginning. That's what let us get the momentum, let us sleep well at night, is because we knew this team was capable of winning a championship. We just had to have some good luck." His crew chief Chad Knaus commented on the pressure the No. 48 team faced, "This team has really come into its own the last year. We've had to battle back from a lot of weird stuff. I'm more happy for my guys than for myself." Kenseth expressed disappointment with his performance during the Chase for the Nextel Cup, but was pleased to be runner-up to Johnson, "If we had run in the Chase like we did in August, we would have been 200 points clear before Homestead, If you look at all the problems people had in the Chase and we didn't have any, that was dragging me down. But this is probably one of the best seasons I've ever had. I won four races, and we could have won eight or nine."

After the race, NASCAR officials summoned Newman and his crew chief Matt Borland to meet with them about his accident with Montoya on lap 252 so that they could question the pair about whether the contact was intentional. Montoya said of the crash after leaving the circuit's infield care center, "It's one of those things that happens in racing. The Texaco/Havoline Dodge was a great car today. Everybody worked so hard on this racecar. It's a shame. It's a fast racecar." According to Newman, Montoya's car cut in front of his, "I felt bad for the situation because, obviously, it looked like I was retaliating, but that's not the case. That's what we just talked about."

Johnson won the Drivers' Championship with 6,475 points, 56 more than second-placed Matt Kenseth. Hamlin was the highest-placed rookie in third with 6,407 points. Harvick and Earnhardt were fourth and fifth with 6,397 and 6,328 points respectively, and Jeff Gordon, Burton, Kahne, Martin, and Kyle Busch rounded out the top ten drivers in the final Chase for the Nextel Cup standings. Chevrolet won the Manufacturers' Championship with 279 points. Dodge was 76 points behind in second, and Ford was a further point behind in third. The race took three hours, 12 minutes, and 23 seconds to complete, and the margin of victory was 0.389 seconds.

=== Race results ===
Pos	No.	Driver	Team	Manufacturer	Laps	Points
1	16	Greg Biffle	Roush Racing	Ford	268	185^{1}
2	1	Martin Truex Jr.	Dale Earnhardt, Inc.	Chevrolet	268	175^{1}
3	11	Denny Hamlin	Joe Gibbs Racing	Chevrolet	268	165
4	9	Kasey Kahne	Evernham Motorsports	Dodge	268	170^{2}
5	29	Kevin Harvick	Richard Childress Racing	Chevrolet	268	155
6	17	Matt Kenseth	Roush Racing	Ford	268	150
7	10	Scott Riggs	Evernham Motorsports	Dodge	268	151^{1}
8	99	Carl Edwards	Roush Racing	Ford	268	142
9	48	Jimmie Johnson	Hendrick Motorsports	Chevrolet	268	143^{1}
10	07	Clint Bowyer	Richard Childress Racing	Chevrolet	268	134
11	40	David Stremme	Chip Ganassi Racing	Dodge	268	130
12	33	Scott Wimmer	Richard Childress Racing	Chevrolet	268	127
13	01	Joe Nemechek	Ginn Racing	Chevrolet	268	124
14	31	Jeff Burton	Richard Childress Racing	Chevrolet	268	121
15	20	Tony Stewart	Joe Gibbs Racing	Chevrolet	268	118
16	41	Reed Sorenson	Chip Ganassi Racing	Dodge	268	115
17	15	Paul Menard	Dale Earnhardt, Inc.	Chevrolet	268	117^{1}
18	6	Mark Martin	Roush Racing	Ford	268	109
19	8	Dale Earnhardt Jr.	Dale Earnhardt, Inc.	Chevrolet	268	111^{1}
20	96	Tony Raines	Hall of Fame Racing	Chevrolet	268	103
21	25	Brian Vickers	Hendrick Motorsports	Chevrolet	267	100
22	66	Jeff Green	Hass CNC Racing	Chevrolet	267	97
23	12	Ryan Newman	Penske Racing South	Dodge	267	94
24	24	Jeff Gordon	Hendrick Motorsports	Chevrolet	267	91
25	00	Bill Elliott	Michael Waltrip Racing	Chevrolet	267	88
26	22	Dave Blaney	Bill Davis Racing	Dodge	266	85
27	32	Travis Kvapil	PPI Motorsports	Chevrolet	266	82
28	45	Kyle Petty	Petty Enterprises	Dodge	266	79
29	21	Ken Schrader	Wood Brothers Racing	Ford	266	76
30	18	J. J. Yeley	Joe Gibbs Racing	Chevrolet	265	78^{1}
31	88	Dale Jarrett	Robert Yates Racing	Ford	265	70
32	42	Casey Mears	Chip Ganassi Racing	Dodge	261	67
33	38	David Gilliland	Robert Yates Racing	Ford	257	64
34	30	Juan Pablo Montoya	Chip Ganassi Racing	Dodge	251	61
35	26	Jamie McMurray	Roush Racing	Ford	250	58
36	19	Elliott Sadler	Evernham Motorsports	Dodge	230	60^{1}
37	14	Sterling Marlin	MB2 Motorsports	Chevrolet	213	52
38	5	Kyle Busch	Hendrick Motorsports	Chevrolet	206	54^{1}
39	49	Mike Bliss	BAM Racing	Dodge	201	46
40	7	Robby Gordon	Robby Gordon Motorsports	Chevrolet	187	43
41	43	Bobby Labonte	Petty Enterprises	Dodge	83	40
42	09	Jeremy Mayfield	Phoenix Racing	Dodge	78	37
43	2	Kurt Busch	Penske Racing South	Dodge	9	34
^{1} Includes five bonus points for leading a lap^{2} Includes ten bonus points for leading the most laps

== Standings after the race ==
Drivers' Championship standings
Rank	+/–	Driver	Points
1		Jimmie Johnson	6,475
2		Matt Kenseth	6,419 (−56)
3	1	Denny Hamlin	6,407 (−68)
4	1	Kevin Harvick	6,397 (−78)
5		Dale Earnhardt Jr.	6,328 (−147)
6		Jeff Gordon	6,256 (−219)
7		Jeff Burton	6,228 (−247)
8	1	Kasey Kahne	6,183 (−292)
9	1	Mark Martin	6,168 (−302)
10		Kyle Busch	6,027 (−448)

Manufacturers' Championship standings
Rank	+/–	Manufacturer	Points
1		Chevrolet	279
2		Dodge	203 (−76)
3		Ford	202 (−77)

- Note: Only the top ten positions are included for the driver standings. These drivers qualified for the Chase for the Nextel Cup.

Previous race: 2006 Checker Auto Parts 500	Nextel Cup Series; 2006 season	Next race: 2007 Daytona 500
