= Miss Orlando =

The Miss Orlando has been a staple of the Orlando community since 1933, serving as an official preliminary to the Miss Florida and Miss America. Tghe pageant has operated in different names prior to the current one, including Miss Winter Park, Miss Orange County, and Miss City Beautiful. In January 2023, Makaila Nichols was named the incoming Executive Director of the Miss Orlando Scholarship Competition. Later that year, Nichols took over the program as the current Executive Director, following the announced retirement of then Executive Director, David Wheeler, heading into the 2023/24 competition season. Wheeler continues to serve as Ex Officio/Advisor and Historian for the organization.

== Winners: Miss Category (official Miss America Local annual operating reports) ==
Year	Name	Hometown	University	Placement at Miss Florida	Special scholarships at Miss Florida	Notes
2025	Bethany Worley	TBA	Jacksonville University	TBA	TBA	TBA
2024	Amber Boykin	Thonotosassa	Warner University	TBA	TBA	TBA
2023	Madison Zavitz	Orlando	Bowling Green State University	Top 10		Madison Zavitz was crowned Miss City Beautiful 2023 and 1st runner-up to the title, Miss Orlando 2023. Zavitz was crowned Miss Orlando 2023 following Juliette Valle's win and crowning as Miss Florida in June 2023.
2023	Juliette Valle	South Florida	University of Miami	Crowned Miss Florida 2023		
2022	Aanchal Shah	Jacksonville	FSU College of Medicine	Top 10 Finalist	Social Impact Scholarship Award (1st RU) Natalie Lang Athlete Scholar Memorial Scholarship	First Indian American to ever be crowned Miss Orlando. She went on to become the first candidate of Indian American descent to be a top 10 finalist at Miss Florida. All $7,000 will be going to her medical school tuition.
2021	Archie Sanders	TBD	TBD	TBD	TBD	TBD
2020	TBD	TBD	TBD	TBD	TBD	TBD
2019	TBD	TBD	TBD	TBD	TBD	TBD
2018	Michaela Mclean	Orlando	TBD	TBD	TBD	TBD
2017	Katy Sartain	Dade City, Florida	Florida State University	4th Runner Up	Overall Interview Award	TBD
2016	TBD	TBD	TBD	TBD	TBD	TBD
2015	TBD	TBD	TBD	TBD	TBD	TBD
2014	TBD	TBD	TBD	TBD	TBD	TBD
2013	TBD	TBD	TBD	TBD	TBD	TBD
2012	Amanda Harris	Jacksonville	UCF	TBD	TBD	$8,000 in scholarships won at Miss Orlando
2012	Sara York, Miss Orange County	Dothan	UCF	TBD	TBD	Miss Orange County (2nd title at Miss Orlando Pageant; $4,000 in scholarships won at Miss Orlando
2011	Ashley Ramsey	Tampa	USF	Top 15	n/a	$10,500 won at Miss Orlando
2011*	Brittany Hagan, Miss Orange County	Tampa	University of Tampa	Top 10	Miss America Community Service Award	*Miss Orange County (2nd Title), $3,500 won at Miss Orlando, formerly 2010 National Sweetheart
2010	Vicky DiSanto	Orlando	UCF	Semi-finalist (Top 15)		
2009	Mandi Jo John	Fort Myers	UCF			Miss Black & Gold titleholder
2008	Lisa Van Alstine		Rollins College	Top 10 at Miss Florida 2008 Preliminary Evening Gown Award		
2007	Megan Clementi	Orlando	UCF	Miss Florida top 10		Miss Florida USA 2010
2005	Ashley Hux			Top 10 at Miss Florida 2005		
2004	Ameigh Verderosa	Melbourne	Rollins College, Boston University Medical School	Miss Florida top 10	Preliminary Interview Award, Community Service Award	Won $18,500 at Miss Orlando; Miss America national Allman Medical Scholarship recipient
2003	Valerie Lynch			2nd Runner up at Miss Florida	Preliminary Talent Winner	
2002	Charlene Closshey*			Top 10; Preliminary Talent		
2001	Ericka Dunlap	Orlando	UCF	Miss FL 2003		First African-American to win the title of Miss Florida; Miss America 2004
2000	Charlene Closshey					
1999	Kristin Cimock			Miss Florida Top 10		
1998	Heidi Koscicki					
1997	Kristi Sheffield	Orlando		3rd runner up to Miss Florida		
1996	Jennifer Alvarez	Orlando		3rd runner up to Miss Florida		
1995	Kelli Meierhenry					
1994	Melissa Holt			3rd runner up to Miss Florida		Miss Orlando judge 2010; now Melissa Minyard; appeared in Les Misérables on Broadway
1993	Kristi Vannatter					
1992	Jennifer Ragsdale			Top 10		
1991	Christina Chauncey			Top 10		
1990	Dana Rhinehart Dalton					WINNER - Miss Florida 1990; Preliminary Swimsuit winner at Miss America
1989	Patricia Wresh					
1986	Mary Iles			Non-finalist Talent		
1985	Susan Jones					
1984	Lori Block			4th runner up; Preliminary Swimsuit		
1983	Lisa Fernandez					
1982	Lynn Peghiny					
1981	Lory Mercer			Top 10		
1980	Karen Culliver					
1979	Laura Trasport			1st runner up; Preliminary Swimsuit		
1978	Kristen Tetsworth					
1977	Leslie Norris			1st runner up Preliminary Swimsuit		
1976	Patricia Perkins			1st runner up; Preliminary Talent		
1975	Donna Hatcher			4th runner up		
1974	Delta Burke			WINNER Miss Florida 1974		Miss America Non-Finalist Talent Award
1973	Joy Jones					
1972	Wanda Miller					
1971	Wanda Miller					
1970	Deborah Bacchus					
1969	Pamela Lab			Top 10; Preliminary Talent		
1968	Evelyn Peterman					
1967	Cherie Bauer					
1966	Cheryl Johnson			2nd runner up; Preliminary Talent and Swimsuit		
1965	Patricia Magamoll					
1964	Lydia Laurel					
1963	Nancy Collins			2nd runner up; Preliminary Evening Gown		
1962	Becky Jenkins			1st runner up; Preliminary Talent		
1961	Connie Quinn			4th runner up		
1960	Judy Bradley					
1959	Alice Marie Pruitt	Orlando				
1958	Dianne Tauscher			WINNER Miss Florida 1958		
1957	Betty Moch					
1956	Deanna Lund					
1955	Sandra Walton					
1954	Florence Winfree					
1953	Shirley Buscher					
1952	Evelyn Patrick					
1951	Marcia Crane			WINNER Miss Florida 1952		
1935	Sara Carroll					
1933	Katherine Jones					
