= Bruce Meade =

American softball player (born 1951)

Bruce Allen Meade (born c. 1951) is an inductee of both the Independent Softball Association Hall of Fame and the United States Slo-pitch Softball Association Hall of Fame. Meade has also been named to the All-World Tournament Team seven times. During his career, he appeared in nine ISA Super Major World Tournaments and three Senior World Tournaments.

== Early athletic career ==
Born in Bradenton, Florida, Bruce Meade did not play softball as a youth. Meade started roller skating at the age of 8 and won a regional championship for boys 18 and under in the freestyle category. He was also on his high school track team and competed in High Jump and Pole Vault.

== Softball career highlights ==
Meade has a lifetime average of .735 and hit more than 2,000 home runs in his career including 230 home runs in 1978 alone. In his 20-year career, Meade never batted below .625 and for 11 of those years he batted over .700.

== 510 Foot home run ==
Meade is best known for hitting a regulation softball (Dudley SB12L red stitch) 510 feet in Amarillo, Texas, in 1978. The distance was documented by an American Softball Association official who was in attendance.

== Family ==
Bruce Meade is married to his wife Ellen and they have two children, Bryce and Blake. Bruce Meade's sister Ellen Meade is an American beauty pageant titleholder who won Miss Florida 1973.
