= Picture Windows =

- Genre: Drama
- Created by: Scott J.T. Frank; Daniel Halperin; David Wachs
- Country of origin: United States
- Original language: English
- No. of episodes: 6

Production
- Running time: 30 minutes

Original release
- Network: Showtime
- Release: September 1995 – October 1995

Picture Windows is an American television miniseries that aired on Showtime in 1995. It consists of six short films, each inspired by a different iconic painting, matched with a story by a renowned author, and directed by a prominent filmmaker such as Norman Jewison, Peter Bogdanovich, Jonathan Kaplan, Joe Dante, John Boorman, and Bob Rafelson, respectively. With a different cast in each installment, these films included performances by a number of notable actors, including Alan Arkin, George Segal, Sally Kirkland, Robert Loggia, Steve Zahn, Brooke Adams, Dan Hedaya, Michael Lerner, Ron Perlman, and John Hurt. Co-creator David Wesley Wachs also wrote and directed a 20-minute pilot titled The Life of Art based on the painting Hitchhiker by Robert Gwathmey. Dan Halperin directed the pilot episode for the series entitled Rosemary, which was produced by Halperin and Scott JT Frank under their Epiphany Pictures banner.

== Reception ==
The miniseries won one an Emmy Award and several CableAce Awards. John Boorman's episode, Two Nudes Bathing, was screened in the Un Certain Regard section at the 1995 Cannes Film Festival. The series was also acknowledged for the exceptional cinematography of Seamus Deasy and Paul Sarossy.

== Episodes ==
No.	Title	Directed by	Written by	Original release date
1	"Soir Bleu"	Norman Jewison	Seth Flicker	TBA
Inspired by the painting Soir Bleu by Edward Hopper.
2	"Song of Songs"	Peter Bogdanovich	Harry Mark Petrakis; John Petrakis	TBA
Inspired by the painting Primavera by Sandro Botticelli.
3	"Language of the Heart"	Jonathan Kaplan	Bruce Meade	TBA
Inspired by the painting Ballet Rehearsal by Edgar Degas.
4	"Lightning"	Joe Dante	Jim Byrnes	TBA
Inspired by the painting Stampede by Lightning by Frederic Remington.
5	"Two Nudes Bathing"	John Boorman	John Boorman	TBA
Inspired by the painting Gabrielle d'Estrées et une de ses sœurs by an unknown artist.
6	"Armed Response"	Bob Rafelson	Frederic Raphael	TBA
Inspired by the painting Portrait of an Artist (Pool with Two Figures) by David Hockney.
