= Jaclyn Raulerson =

American model (born 1990)

- Born: Jaclyn Frances Raulerson; August 28, 1990 (age 36); Plant City, Florida
- Education: Durant High School; University of Central Florida; University of Florida
- Height: 5 ft 11 in (1.80 m)
- Beauty pageant titleholder
- Title: Miss Largo's Outstanding Teen 2005; Miss Lakeland 2009; Miss Largo 2010; Miss Florida 2010; Miss Florida USA 2013
- Hair color: Blonde
- Eye color: Blue
- Major competition: Miss America 2011

Jaclyn Frances Raulerson (born August 28, 1990) is an American beauty pageant titleholder from Plant City, Florida who was named Miss Florida 2010. She represented Florida in the 2011 Miss America pageant, where she was a top 7 finalist for the Quality of Life award, recognizing her work with her platform, "Stop Bullying Now!"

Raulerson graduated from University of Florida with a degree in Telecommunications. She is an anchor/host in South Carolina where she resides with her husband.

Awards and achievements
| Preceded by Rachael Todd | Miss Florida; 2010 | Succeeded by Kristina Janolo |
