= Kylie Williams (Miss Florida) =

American beauty queen

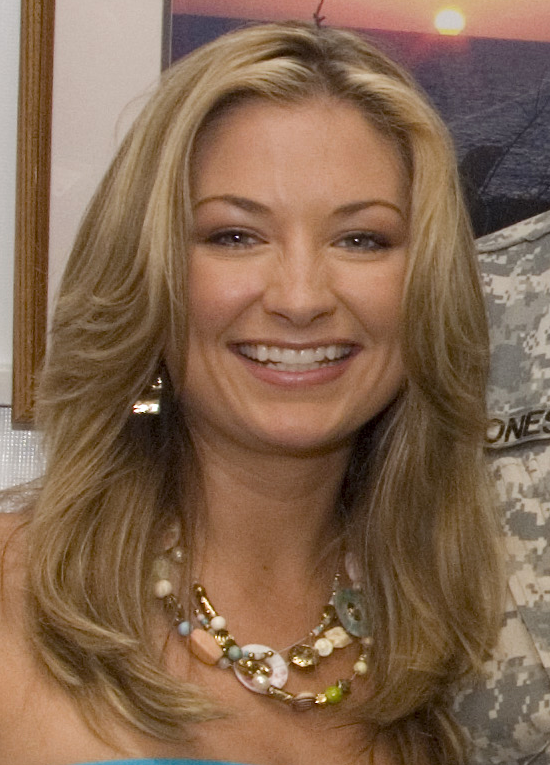
- Williams in 2007
- Born: July 22, 1983 (age 43)
- Beauty pageant titleholder
- Title: Miss Florida 2007
- Hair color: Blonde
- Eye color: Green
- Major competition: Miss America 2008 (top 15)

Kylie Williams is a beauty queen from Jasper, Florida who has competed in the Miss America pageant.

After winning the Miss Tallahassee title, Williams went on to compete in and win the Miss Florida 2007 pageant. Prior to this, she had competed in Miss Florida every year since 2003. Williams went on to represent Florida in the Miss America 2008 pageant, where she made the top fifteen and was first runner-up to the Quality of Life award. Williams also gained significant coverage on the reality show Miss America: Reality Check as shown on TLC.

Williams was valedictorian of her high school and a summa cum laude graduate of North Florida Community College. Williams went on to graduate from Florida State University with bachelor's degree in marketing and is an alumna of the Alpha Delta Pi sorority. She was born on July 22, 1983.

In 2007, the Florida Department of Veterans Affairs named Williams "Official Ambassador for Veterans' Advocacy". Williams traveled the state of Florida fighting for veterans' rights, educating veterans on how to gain access to their benefits, and visiting veterans in VA hospitals and homes. Williams experienced a flight in an F-15 and visited the troops on a USO Tour at Guantanamo Bay, Cuba during the 2007 and 2008 Christmas holidays.

After giving up her Miss Florida title in 2008, Williams spent time at the Florida Capitol lobbying for Veterans Rights. During her time there, she successful assisted in having several bills passed and worked alongside Governor Charlie Crist, and Lt. Governor Jeff Kottcamp during the launch of www.vetsfirst.org.

Williams went on to lead a successful career in medical sales, working for Fortune 500 companies as GE Healthcare.

| Preceded by Allison Kreiger | Miss Florida; 2007 | Succeeded by Sierra Minott |
