= Jessica Lynch (Miss New York) =

American former pageant contestant (born 1979)

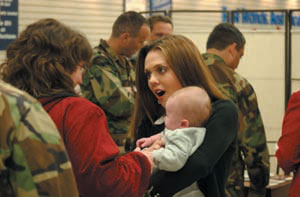
- Miss New York 2003, Jessica Lynch, greets Soldiers and their families at the Post Exchange at Fort Drum.
- Born: Jessica Lynch; January 14, 1979 (age 47); New York, New York, U.S.
- Other name: Jessica Renzi
- Spouse: David Renzi
- Children: 2
- Beauty pageant titleholder
- Title: Miss New York 2003
- Major competition: Miss America 2004

Jessica Lynch Renzi (born January 14, 1979, in New York, New York) is an American former pageant contestant who held the title of Miss New York in 2003 and competed in the Miss America 2004 pageant.

== Miss New York ==
Lynch competed in the Miss New York pageant as Miss New York City. She graduated from the University of Virginia with a B.A. in Theater. Her talent was ballet. She began her formal ballet training at the age of 10 with Ballet Memphis. She was seen in the ensemble of the world-famous Radio City Music Hall Christmas Spectacular. Her platform was "Combating Teenage Depression and Suicide" because she struggled with depression and wanted to help others going through similar experiences.

== Personal life ==
Lynch married David Renzi, took his surname and had two sons. As of 2008, she teaches at the In Motion School of Dance and co-organized the Miss Northern New York 2008 pageant.
