= Allison Kreiger =

American model

Allison Kreiger Walsh
- Born: Allison Lee Kreiger; Fort Myers, Florida, U.S.
- Beauty pageant titleholder
- Title: Miss Florida 2006
- Hair color: Blonde
- Eye color: Green
- Major competition: Miss America 2007

Allison Lee Kreiger Walsh is a beauty queen from Miami, Florida who has competed in the Miss Florida pageant and the Miss America pageant.

Walsh won the Miss Florida title in the state pageant held July 8, 2006. She had previously won Miss University of Florida in 2002 and Miss Miami in 2006.

== Early life ==
Walsh was born in Fort Myers, Florida on July 8, 1983. She is a graduate of Bishop Moore High School in Orlando, Florida. In addition, she was a cum laude graduate of the University of Florida with a degree in Public Relations. Her scholastic honors included Mortar Board; Omicron Delta Kappa; Golden Key International Honour Society; National Dean's List; Chancellor's List; Phi Sigma Theta Honor Society; Alpha Lambda Delta; Phi Eta Sigma and the National Society of Collegiate Scholars.

She is also a member of Delta Delta Delta sorority at the University of Florida. She pledged in 2002.

== Career ==
Walsh founded H.O.P.E. – Helping Other People Eat, a 501c3 nonprofit organization that focuses on the prevention and awareness of eating disorders. She served as the inaugural Chairwoman of the National Jr. Board for the National Eating Disorders Association.

In 2006, she started collecting jeans as an initiative through HOPE and NEDA to encourage people to "Be Comfortable In Your Genes- Don't Fight Your Genes, Just Change Your Jeans." Since 2006, over 25,000 pair of jeans have been collected and donated to charities in need. In 2010, Walsh launched the “Get R.E.A.L.” Program, encouraging everyone to set “Realistic Expectations and Attitudes for Life.” This innovative video outreach program was distributed to over 12,000 schools, hospitals, community health organizations and treatment centers throughout the State of Florida and to every college in the nation. In addition to being Miss Florida 2006, Walsh was the recipient of the Miss Florida Community Service Award, the Miss America State Community Service Award in 2007 and the overall interview award.

Walsh earned $38,000 in scholarships while competing in the Miss America Organization. She logged over 80,000 miles in her travels as Miss Florida and completed over 250 appearances. In 2007, Walsh received the Young Woman of Distinction Award from the Girl Scouts of Citrus Council and in 2008 Walsh was honored as the National Eating Disorders Association Youth Advocate of the Year and was a winner in the 38th Annual Women's Achievement Awards presented by the Women's Executive Council, as Emerging Achiever of the Year in 2008.

| Preceded by Mari Wilensky | Miss Florida; 2006 | Succeeded by Kylie Williams |
