= Rose Marie Magrill =

Rosemary Magrill (stage name Rose Marie Magrill; 1924 – 19 March 2016) was Miss Florida in 1939. At the time she was crowned, she was underage. She went on to place as a semi-finalist in Miss America and became widely known as a "tap dancer extraordinary" with shows in a number of famous venues including Broadway.

== Childhood ==
Magrill grew up in Miami, Florida. Her lifelong interest in dance already showed by age 7, at which age the Miami News says she was "teaching playmates at 10 cents per lesson". The 1941 article continues to track her career - running a dance school of 150 pupils by age 12, and "Miss Florida" at age 14, until her 17th pageant win at age 16, which won her a tour of the United States and South America.

== 1930s - 1940s fame ==
Following her success, True Story - one of the major women's magazines of the time - placed Rose Marie Magrill on its cover for their October 1939 issue.

Magrill was a Miss Miami local contest winner. In order to compete in the Miss Florida pageant, girls were required to be at least 18 and were carefully screened for age, but there were 260 other girls in the contest and Magrill was able to complete the screening process without being asked her age. The finals took place in Atlantic City in September 1939. Her true age was not revealed to contest officials until after her crowning, when she was competing for the title of Miss America. Magrill was permitted to continue in the Miss America contest, where she ultimately finished as a semi-finalist.

At some time after the Miss America contest, Magrill lived in New York and became a Broadway dancer. She was the cover girl for True Story magazine in October, 1939 - a major national magazine at the time. A November 2006 article in the South Florida Sun-Sentinel described her dance career:

"[Rose Marie Magrill] was called "tap dancer extraordinary" by newspapers in the 1930s. She danced on Broadway and in the George White Scandals of 1939 and the Duke Ellington Review of 1943. She danced in hotel venues and all the big clubs in the country, including the Martha Raye's Five O'clock Club in Miami Beach. Her name was in lights on the marquee at the 500 Club in Atlantic City."

According to Broadwayworld.com her Broadway performances included dancing girl and performer roles for:

- George White's Scandals (1939)
- A Connecticut Yankee (Broadway Revival, 1943)
- Bright Lights of 1944 (Original Broadway Production, 1943)

== Later life and death ==
For many years (in the 1960s and 1970s), Magrill ran a dancing school in New Jersey with her husband, Ned Walsh. Until 2012, Magrill was a dance instructor in Fort Lauderdale, Florida.

Magrill died on 19 March 2016, at the age of 92, after a very brief illness.
