= Miss America 2004 =

77th Miss America pageant

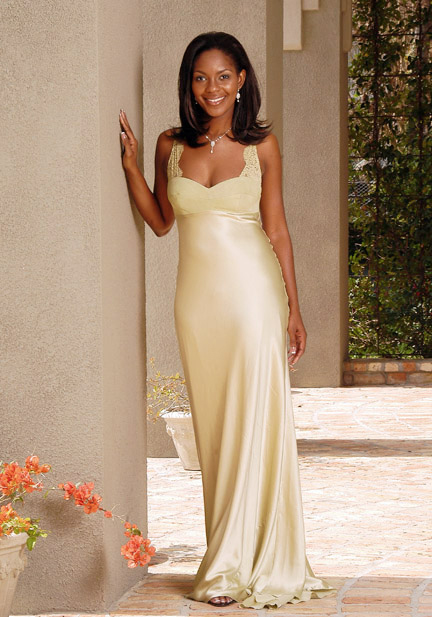
- Ericka Dunlap in 2004
- Date: September 20, 2003
- Presenters: Tom Bergeron
- Venue: Boardwalk Hall, Atlantic City, New Jersey
- Broadcaster: ABC
- Winner: Ericka Dunlap; Florida

Miss America 2004, the 77th Miss America pageant, was broadcast from the Boardwalk Hall in Atlantic City, New Jersey on Saturday, September 20, 2003 on ABC Network. Ericka Dunlap, Miss Florida, was crowned by outgoing Miss America 2003 Erika Harold.

== Results ==
=== Placements ===
Final results	Contestant
Miss America 2004	Florida – Ericka Dunlap
1st runner-up	Hawaii – Kanoelani Gibson
2nd runner-up	Wisconsin – Tina Sauerhammer
3rd runner-up	Maryland – Marina Harrison
4th runner-up	California – Nicole Lamarche
Top 10	Indiana – Bryn Chapman; New Hampshire – Candace Glickman; Oklahoma – Kelley Scott; Rhode Island – Laurie Gray; Virginia – Nancy Redd
Top 15	Alabama – Catherine Crosby; (Georgia (U.S. state)) Georgia – Andrea Bailey; Michigan – Madonna Emond; Missouri – Amber Etheridge; New Jersey – Jennifer Farrell

=== Awards ===
==== Preliminary awards ====
Awards	Contestant
Lifestyle and Fitness	California – Nicole Lamarche; New Hampshire – Candace Glickman; Virginia – Nancy Redd
Talent	Hawaii – Kanoelani Gibson; Rhode Island – Laurie Gray; Wisconsin – Tina Sauerhammer

==== Quality of Life award ====
Results	Contestant	Platform
Winner	Alabama – Catherine Crosby	First Vote: America's Freedom to Choose
1st runner-up	Kentucky – MacKenzie Mayes	–
2nd runner-up	North Carolina – Dana Reason	–

==== Final night awards ====
Awards	Contestant
Evening wear	Florida – Ericka Dunlap
Swimsuit	California – Nicole Lamarche
Talent	Florida – Ericka Dunlap
Casual wear	Maryland – Marina Harrison

==== Non-finalist awards ====
Award	Contestant
Interview	Arkansas – Whitney Kirk; Oregon – April Robinson; Vermont – Drell Hunter; (Washington (state)) Washington – Fianna Dickson
Talent	Kansas – Angelea Busby; Kentucky – MacKenzie Mayes; Maine – Elizabeth Edgecomb; Nebraska – Jane Noseworthy; Pennsylvania – Candace Otto; South Carolina – Jessica Eddins; Texas – Sunni Cranfill; Utah – Stacy Johnson

== Delegates ==
State	Name	Hometown	Age^{1}	Talent	Placement	Awards	Notes
Alabama	Catherine Crosby	Brewton	23	Flute	Top 15	Quality of Life	
Alaska	Blair Chenoweth	Anchorage	21	Ballet en Pointe			Miss Alaska USA 2007
Arizona	Corrie Hill	Gilbert	24	Dance			
Arkansas	Whitney Kirk	Cabot	22	Vocal / Dance		Non-finalist Interview	
California	Nicole Lamarche	Berkeley	24	Vocal	4th runner-up	Preliminary Swimsuit, Final night Swimsuit	
Colorado	Katee Doland	Arvada	23	Lyrical Dance			Miss Colorado Teen USA 1998, Miss Colorado USA 2001
Connecticut	Marla Prete	North Haven	22	Tap Dance			
Delaware	Erin Elizabeth Williams	Lincoln	20	Vocal			
District of Columbia	Lisa Ferris	Portland, OR	21	Vocal			
Florida	Ericka Dunlap	Orlando	21	Vocal	Winner	Final night Evening Gown, Final night Talent	Later appeared on The Amazing Race 15 as a contestant along with her then-husband Brian Kleinschmidt
Georgia	Andrea Bailey	Evans	24	Vocal	Top 15		
Hawaii	Kanoelani Gibson	Kapolei	22	Vocal	1st runner-up	Preliminary Talent	
Idaho	Tiffany Jewell	Boise	22	Vocal			
Illinois	Andrea Fritz	Schaumburg	21	Lyrical Dance			
Indiana	Bryn Chapman	Indianapolis	21	Vocal	Top 10		
Iowa	Nicole White	Eldridge	22	Vocal			
Kansas	Angelea Busby	Lenexa	21	Interpretative Baton Twirling / Dance		Non-finalist Talent	
Kentucky	MacKenzie Mayes	Lexington	23	Vocal		Quality of Life 1st runner-up, Non-finalist Talent	
Louisiana	Melissa Clark	Ruston	23	Vocal			
Maine	Elizabeth Edgecomb	Limestone	20	Classical Piano		Non-finalist Talent	
Maryland	Marina Harrison	Severn	22	Vocal	3rd runner-up	Final night Casual Wear	Miss Maryland USA 2005
Massachusetts	Melissa Silva	Fall River	23	Vocal			
Michigan	Madonna Emond	Livonia	22	Jazz Dance	Top 15		
Minnesota	Megan Torgerson	Warren	23	Vocal			
Mississippi	Allison Kellogg	Madison	22	Ballet en Pointe			
Missouri	Amber Etheridge	Springfield	23	Vocal	Top 15		
Montana	Amber Shipman	Glendive	19	Dance			
Nebraska	Jane Noseworthy	Bellevue	24	Vocal		Non-finalist Talent	
Nevada	Christina O'Neil	Carson City	24	Vocal			
New Hampshire	Candace Glickman	Manchester	21	Vocal	Top 10	Preliminary Swimsuit	Miss New Hampshire USA 2005
New Jersey	Jennifer Farrell	Margate	19	Ballet en Pointe	Top 15		
New Mexico	Rana Jones	Tatum	22	Vocal			Miss New Mexico Teen USA 1998
New York	Jessica Lynch	New York City	24	Jazz Dance en Pointe			
North Carolina	Dana Reason	Raleigh	24	Tap Dance		Quality of Life 2nd runner-up	
North Dakota	Sara Schelkoph	Grand Forks	23	Lyrical Ballet			
Ohio	Janelle Couts	Akron	22	Vocal			
Oklahoma	Kelley Scott	Owasso	23	Vocal	Top 10		
Oregon	April Robinson	Gresham	22	Tap Dance		Non-finalist Interview	
Pennsylvania	Candace Otto	Murrysville	23	Classical Vocal		Non-finalist Talent	
Rhode Island	Laurie Gray	Warwick	22	Classical Violin	Top 10	Preliminary Talent	
South Carolina	Jessica Eddins	Columbia	24	Classical Vocal		Non-finalist Talent	
South Dakota	Sara Seever	Custer	21	Vocal / Dance			
Tennessee	Jamie Watkins	Soddy Daisy	23	Vocal			
Texas	Sunni Cranfill	Hooks	23	Ballet en Pointe		Non-finalist Talent	
Utah	Stacy Johnson	Provo	21	Latin Jazz Dance		Non-finalist Talent	
Vermont	Drell Hunter	Sharon	24	Lyrical Dance		Non-finalist Interview	
Virginia	Nancy Redd	Martinsville	22	Piano	Top 10	Preliminary Swimsuit	
Washington	Fianna Dickson	Spokane	24	Classical Jazz Dance		Non-finalist Interview	
West Virginia	Allison Williams	Morgantown	22	Vocal			
Wisconsin	Tina Sauerhammer	Green Bay	22	Classical Cello	2nd runner-up	Preliminary Talent	
Wyoming	Tamara Kocher	Gillette	22	Dance			

^{1} Age as of September 2003
