= Miss Rhode Island =

Beauty pageant competition

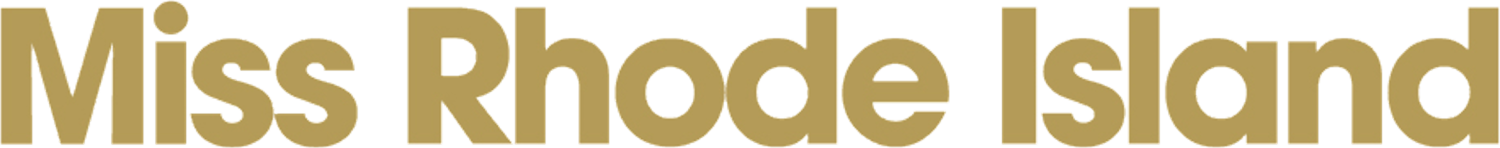
- Formation: 1923
- Type: Beauty pageant
- Headquarters: Providence
- Location: Rhode Island
- Members: Miss America
- Official language: English
- Website: Official website

The Miss Rhode Island competition is the pageant that selects the representative for the state of Rhode Island in the Miss America pageant.

Mia Daley of East Greenwich was crowned Miss Rhode Island on April 25, 2026, at the Historic Park Theatre & Event Center in Cranston, Rhode Island. She competed for the title of Miss America 2027 on September 6, 2026, at the Kravis Center for the Performing Arts in West Palm Beach, Florida.

== Gallery of past titleholders ==
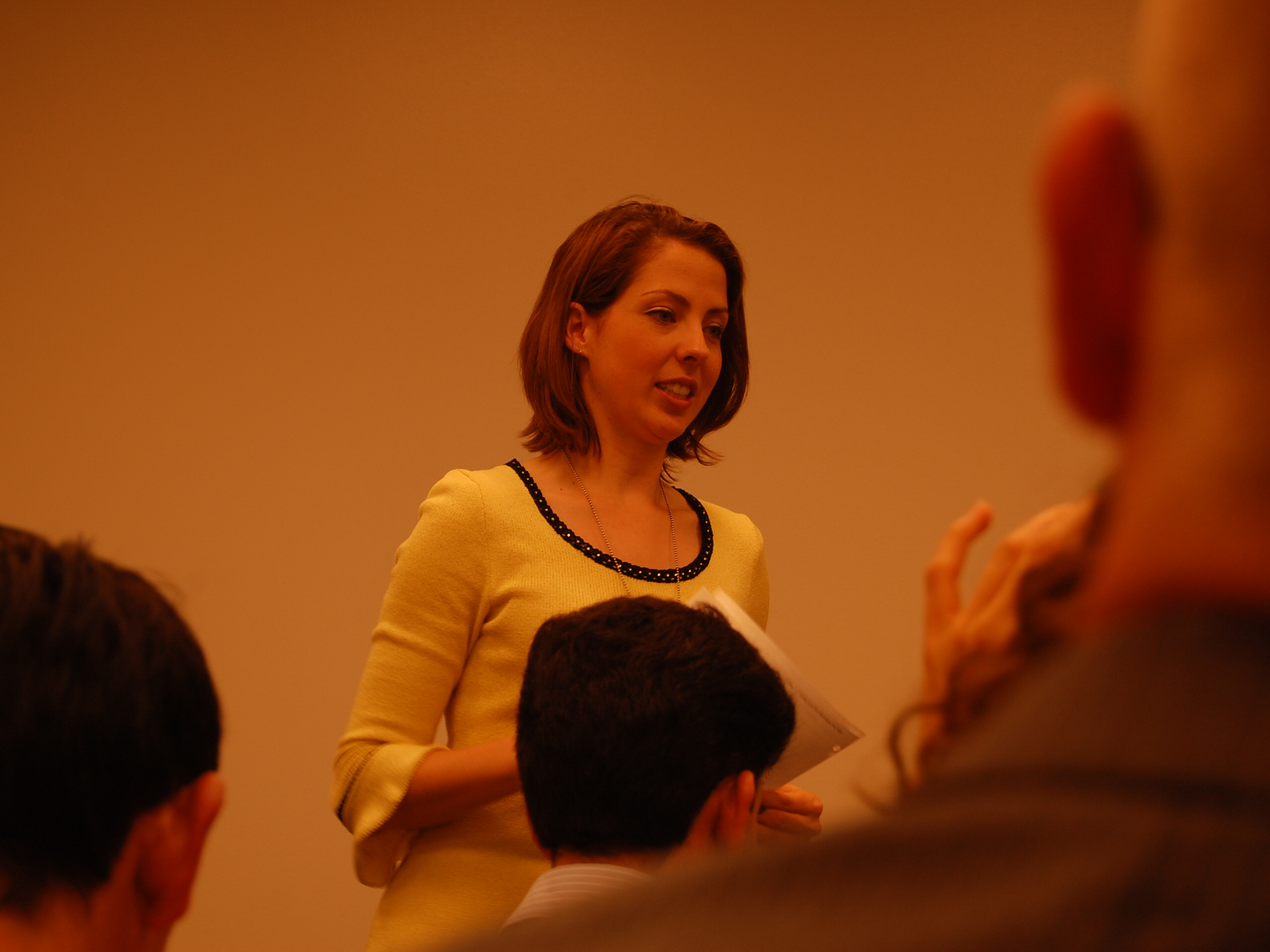
Allison Rogers
Miss Rhode Island 2006, speaking in August 2008

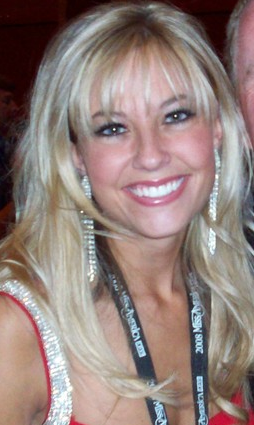
Ashley Bickford,
Miss Rhode Island 2007

== Results summary ==
The following is a visual summary of the past results of Miss Rhode Island titleholders at the national Miss America pageants/competitions. The year in parentheses indicates the year of the national competition during which a placement and/or award was garnered, not the year attached to the contestant's state title.

=== Placements ===
- 3rd runners-up: Marilyn Cocozza (1968)
- 4th runners-up: Caroline Parente (2024)
- Top 10: Laurie Gray (2004)
- Top 15: Deborah Saint-Vil (2011)

=== Awards ===
==== Preliminary awards ====
- Preliminary Lifestyle and Fitness: Debra Cusick (1976), Karen Lindsay (2000), Ashley Bickford (2008)
- Preliminary Talent: Marilyn Cocozza (1968), Laurie Gray (2004), Deborah Saint-Vil (2011)

==== Non-finalist awards ====
- Non-finalist Interview: Lisa Snow (1993)
- Non-finalist Talent: Cheryl Hirst (1962), Cheryl Girr (1967), Teresa Bradley (1971), Karen Salvatore (1975), Kelly Jo Roarke (1998), Julianna Strout (2010)

==== Other awards ====
- Miss Congeniality: Ann Willis (1959)
- Miss Photogenic: Ashley Bickford (2008)
- Dr. David B. Allman Medical Scholarship: Laurie Gray (2004)
- Quality of Life Award Winners: Allison Rogers (2007)
- Quality of Life Award 2nd runners-up: Jessica Marfeo (2014)
- Quality of Life Award Finalists: Ashley Bickford (2008), Francesca Simone (2009), Alexandra Curtis (2016), Alexia Rodrigues (2026)
- Women in Business Scholarship Award Winners: Shruti Nagarajan (2017)

== Winners ==
- Declared as winner
- Ended as a runner-up
- Ended as a finalist or semi-finalist

Year	Name	Hometown	Age	Local Title	Miss America Talent	Placement at Miss America	Special scholarships at Miss America	Notes
2026	Mia Daley	East Greenwich	19	Miss Salve Regina University	Vocal			100th Miss Rhode Island Previously Miss Rhode Island's Teen 2023
2025	Alexia Rodrigues	Warwick	25	Miss Warwick	HER Story		Quality of Life Award Finalist	
2024	Ali Hornung	Providence	24	Miss North Kingstown	Vocal, "Legally Blonde"			
2023	Caroline Parente	South Kingstown	21		Vocal, "Imagine"	4th Runner-Up		Previously Miss Rhode Island's Outstanding Teen 2019-2020
2022	Abby Mansolillo	Providence	22	–	Monologue			
2021	Leigh Payne	Barrington	21	–	Piano			
2019–20 (Note: Titleholder extended to a second full year in 2020 after state and national pageants postponed to 2021 due to the COVID-19 pandemic)	Molly M. Andrade	Middletown	20	–	Irish Step Dance			
2018	Alexandra N. Coppa	Cranston	22	–	Jazz Dance			Previously Miss Rhode Island's Outstanding Teen 2012
2017	Nicolette Peloquin	Newport	21	Miss Newport	Acrobatics, "All That Jazz"			NFL cheerleader for the New England Patriots for the 2018–2019 season
2016	Shruti Nagarajan	Providence	24	Miss Providence County	Bollywood-fusion dance		Women in Business Scholarship Winner	
2015	Alexandra Curtis	East Greenwich	23	Miss West Warwick	Musical Theater Vocal, "Poor Unfortunate Souls"		Quality of Life Award Finalist	Contestant at National Sweetheart 2014 pageant
2014	Ivy DePew	Providence	23	Miss Providence	Flute, "Devil Went Down to Georgia" by the Charlie Daniels Band			Contestant at National Sweetheart 2013 pageant
2013	Jessica Marfeo	Exeter	20	Miss University of Rhode Island	Vocal, "Ain't Misbehavin'"		Quality of Life Award 2nd runner-up	
2012	Kelsey Fournier	Pawtucket	23	Miss Pawtucket	Jazz Dance, "All That Jazz"			Former NFL cheerleader and line captain for the New England Patriots during 2009–2011 seasons
2011	Robin Bonner	Westhampton, NY	20	Miss University of Rhode Island	Jazz Dance, "Americano" by Lady Gaga			
2010	Deborah M. Saint-Vil	Providence	22	Miss Spirit of Hope	Vocal, "Smile"	Top 15	Preliminary Talent Award	
2009	Julianna Clare Strout	Watch Hill	24		Vocal, "Come Rain or Come Shine"		Non-finalist Talent Award	
2008	Francesca Simone	North Smithfield	22		Classical Vocal, "Nessun dorma"		Quality of Life Award Finalist	
2007	Ashley Bickford	Newport	22		Ballet en Pointe		Miss Photogenic Quality of Life Award Finalist Preliminary Lifestyle & Fitness Award	Triple Crown winner: Previously Miss Connecticut Teen USA 2002; Top 10 at Miss Teen USA 2002 pageant; Later Miss Connecticut USA 2010
2006	Allison Rogers	Providence	25		Classical Piano, "Fantaisie-Impromptu"		Quality of Life Award	
2005	Jessica Samson	Newport	23		Vocal, "It's No Secret Anymore"			
2004	Aimee Belisle	North Smithfield	24		Ballet en Pointe, "You're a Grand Old Flag"			
2003	Laurie Gray	Warwick	22		Classical Violin, "Concerto in E Minor, Op. 64"	Top 10	Dr. David B. Allman Medical Scholarship Preliminary Talent Award	
2002	Gianine Marie Teti	Providence	22		Classical Vocal, "Steal Me Sweet Thief" from The Old Maid and the Thief			
2001	Jennifer Leigh D'Ambrosio	Providence	21		Vocal, "As If We Never Said Goodbye" from Sunset Boulevard			Featured on MTV's True Life-I'm a Beauty Queen
2000	Jennifer St. Laurent	Bristol	24		Vocal, "One Monkey Don't Stop No Show"			
1999	Karen Lindsay	Warwick	24		Vocal, "I'm a Woman"		Preliminary Swimsuit Award	Contestant at National Sweetheart 1998 pageant Contestant on The Bachelor
1998	Heather Marie Picard	Cumberland	23		Ballet en Pointe, Carmen			
1997	Kelly Jo Roarke	Cranston	24		Comic Reading, "Non-Bridaled Passion"		Non-finalist Talent Award	
1996	Elana Chomiszak	Providence	21		Dance, "Nice Work If You Can Get It"			
1995	Elizabeth Reilly	North Providence	24	Miss North Providence	Dance, "Everybody Says Don't" from Anyone Can Whistle			
1994	Tori-Lynn Heaton	Cranston	24	Miss Cranston	Character Jazz Dance			First police officer to compete in the Miss America pageant In 1994, Tori-Lynn Heaton (Miss Rhode Island 1994) became the first full-time sworn law enforcement officer to ever compete on the Miss America stage.
1993	Wendy Mello	Narragansett	22	Miss South County	Lyrical Ballet, "A Piece of Sky" from Yentl			
1992	Lisa Snow	Cranston	23	Miss Western Cranston	Dramatic Monologue		Non-finalist Interview Award	
1991	Debi Cutler	North Providence	26	Miss Providence County	Vocal, "Shine On, Harvest Moon"			
1990	Susan Savastano	East Providence	22	Miss Greater Providence County	Tap Dance, "All Right"			
1989	Gloria Berlanga	Davisville	23	Miss Kent County	Flute			
1988	Jenna Wims	Pawtucket	24		Vocal			
1987	Cherilynn Cusick	Providence	21	Miss Providence County	Contemporary Ballet			
1986	Barbara Longo	Barrington				N/A		
1986	Toni Langello	Warwick	20		Vocal, "My Man"			Competed as Miss Rhode Island in Miss America 1987 pageant Later resigned after being arrested for cocaine possession in January 1987
1985	Lori Boucher	Pawtucket	20		Vocal, "Losing My Mind"			
1984	Joanna Minisce	North Smithfield	19	Miss Northern Rhode Island	Modern Jazz Dance			
1983	Pamela Hoff	Providence	21	Miss Providence-Pawtucket	Vocal, "For Once in My Life"			
1982	Cynthia Crook	Warwick	22	Miss Central Rhode Island	Vocal/Dance, "Theme from New York, New York"			
1981	Kathleen Cryan	Providence	23	Miss Eastern Rhode Island	Jazz Dance, "Electro-Phantasma"			
1980	Dawn Potter	Pascoag	20	Miss Northern Rhode Island	Vocal / Dance, "All That Jazz"			
1979	Elaine Rushlow	Westerly	20	Miss Southern Rhode Island	Piano, "Bridge over Troubled Water"			
1978	Lori Leyden	Providence	21		Vocal, "Everything"			
1977	Tanya Kapla	Middletown	21		Ballet en Pointe, "The Dying Swan"			Played Gloria Brown on The Young and the Restless
1976	Debra Cerroni	Esmond	20	Miss University of Rhode Island	Vocal, "Much More" from The Fantasticks			Previously Miss Rhode Island USA 1974
1975	Debra Cusick	Providence	20		Dance, Selections from Promises, Promises		Preliminary Swimsuit Award	
1974	Karen Salvatore	Warwick	22	Miss Rhode Island Coed	Original Skit, "Don't Smoke"		Non-finalist Talent Award	
1973	Patricia Garrahy	North Providence	19		Ballet, "Scarborough Fair"			
1972	Michele Passarelli	Pawtucket	18	Miss Pawtucket	Vocal, "Cabaret"			
1971	Annette Charpentier	Cumberland	21	Miss Cumberland	Semi-classical Vocal, "Eli's Coming"			
1970	Teresa Bradley	East Greenwich	19	Miss North Kingston	Folk Singing & Guitar, "Chelsea Morning"		Non-finalist Talent Award	
1969	Jeanne Bursley	Barrington	20	Miss North Kingston	Vocal / Dance, "Standing on a Corner"			
1968	Arlene Pinto	Warwick	21	Miss Warwick	Vocal / Dance, "Thoroughly Modern Millie"			
1967	Marilyn Cocozza	North Providence	19	Miss Pawtucket	Piano / Vocal, "I Have Confidence" from The Sound of Music	3rd runner-up	Preliminary Talent Award	
1966	Cheryl Girr	Newport	18	Miss Newport	Interpretive Ballet		Non-finalist Talent Award	
1965	Maureen Manton	Warwick	21	Miss Warwick	Dramatic Reading from The Diary of Anne Frank			
1964	Judy Anderson	Warwick	20	Miss Warwick	Vocal / Dance			
1963	Sheila Guarniere	Bristol		Miss Bristol	Piano			
1962	Deborah Babbitt	Bristol	18	Miss Bristol	Acrobatic Musical Comedy Dance			
1961	Cheryl Hirst	Greenville	18	Miss North Providence	Ventriloquism & Organ, "This Can't Be Love"		Non-finalist Talent Award	
1960	Sally Saabye	Warwick	18	Miss Warwick	Piano/Pantomime			
1959	Michalene Chomicz	Pawtucket	23		Vocal			
1958	Ann Louise Willis	Cranston	18				Miss Congeniality	Ann Louise Willis Ratray died at age 81 on June 9, 2021, in New York City, NY. She was a noted stage and screen actress who became a celebrated drama coach
1957	Beatrice Turek	Providence			Art Display			
1956	Gail Gilmore	Barrington			Drama / Piano			
1955	Claire Mae Emerson	Pawtucket			Dramatic Monologue			
1954	Virginia Mary "Ginger" Gregory	Pawtucket	20		Speech			
1953	Joyce Sandberg	Providence			Drama			Later Miss Rhode Island USA 1954
1952	Jayne Bradshaw	Westerly			Classical Vocal			
1951	No Rhode Island representative at Miss America pageant							
1950	No Rhode Island representative at Miss America pageant							
1949	No Rhode Island representative at Miss America pageant							
1948	No Rhode Island representative at Miss America pageant							
1947	Ellen DiCenzo	Providence			Vocal			
1946	Marilyn Tripp	Westerly						
1945	Mary Stevens	Cranston			Vocal, "How Deep Is the Ocean?"			
1944	No Rhode Island representative at Miss America pageant							
1943	No Rhode Island representative at Miss America pageant							
1942	No Rhode Island representative at Miss America pageant							
1941	No Rhode Island representative at Miss America pageant							
1940	No Rhode Island representative at Miss America pageant							
1939	No Rhode Island representative at Miss America pageant							
1938	No Rhode Island representative at Miss America pageant							
1937	Dorothy May Eden	East Providence	18					Dr. Dorothy May Eden Trayner Erinakes died at 97 on March 20, 2017, in San Luis Obispo, California.
1936	Mary Margaret Rogers	Johnston						
1935	Beatrice McKenzie	Providence		Miss Providence				Multiple Rhode Island representatives Contestants competed under local title at Miss America pageant
1935	Leona Mucha	West Warwick		Miss West Warwick				Multiple Rhode Island representatives Contestants competed under local title at Miss America pageant
1935	Marianne Ranallo Grasso							Multiple Rhode Island representatives Contestants competed under local title at Miss America pageant
1934	No national pageant was held							
1933	No Rhode Island representative at Miss America pageant							
1932	No national pageants were held							
1931	No national pageants were held							
1930	No national pageants were held							
1929	No national pageants were held							
1928	No national pageants were held							
1927	June Frances Costello	Providence			N/A			
1926	No Rhode Island representative at Miss America pageant							
1925	Loretta Berchman				N/A			
1924	Freida Leamon	Providence		Miss Providence	N/A			Competed under local title at Miss America pageant
1923	Loretta La Flamme	Providence		Miss Providence	N/A			Competed under local title at Miss America pageant
1922	No Rhode Island representative at Miss America pageant							
1921	No Rhode Island representative at Miss America pageant							
