= Shauna Pender =

American model

- Born: Shauna; Macon, Georgia, US
- Beauty pageant titleholder
- Title: Miss Florida 2003
- Hair color: Dark brown
- Eye color: Green

Shauna Pender is a Miss America preliminary scholarship winner who was crowned Miss Florida in 2003 after preceding Miss Florida Ericka Dunlap won Miss America. She had previously won Miss St. Petersburg, Florida. She was born in 1979.

== Education ==
Pender graduated from Houston County High School near Warner Robins, Georgia.

In 2003, Pender graduated cum laude with a Bachelor of Arts degree in theatre from Florida State University.

== Media ==
Pender appeared on several network program broadcasts as an actress and in numerous media reports on her accident and recovery. She acted in the ABC daytime soap opera All My Children and in the Spring of 2003 she finished in the Top Twelve on the short-lived ABC reality television show "All American Girl".

== Accident ==
Only two weeks after being crowned Miss Florida 2003, Pender was critically injured in an automobile accident on November 7, 2003. Pender was a passenger in a white Lincoln Town Car on her way to a charity event when a refrigerated container tractor-trailer overloaded with avocados overturned on her vehicle in the westbound lanes of the Dolphin Expressway in Miami, Florida. After being rushed to a hospital with life-threatening injuries, Pender momentarily died in the operating room but was resuscitated by medical professionals. Pender underwent months of surgeries and physical therapy to begin her multi-year recovery from the accident. She speaks frequently of the accident and recovery in her motivational speaking engagements.

== Public causes ==
Pender's main focus for her reign as Miss Florida was to have been "Society Embracing Special Needs People", and she continues to speak on disabilities and special needs issues. Following her accident, she also focused on bringing media attention to the dangers of overweight trucks.

Preceded by Ericka Dunlap	Miss Florida; 2003	Succeeded by Jenna Edwards
