= Laura Rutledge =

American reporter (born 1988)

- Rutledge in July 2021
- Born: Laura McKeeman; October 2, 1988 (age 38); St. Petersburg, Florida, U.S.
- Education: University of Florida
- Spouse: Josh Rutledge (m. 2013)
- Children: 2
- Beauty pageant titleholder
- Title: Miss Florida 2012
- Years active: 2012–present
- Major competition: Miss America 2013

Laura Rutledge (née McKeeman; born October 2, 1988) is an American reporter and host for ESPN, ABC and the SEC Network. She is an American beauty pageant titleholder from St. Petersburg, Florida, who was named Miss Florida 2012.

== Biography ==
She won the title of Miss Florida on July 7, 2012, when she received her crown from outgoing titleholder Kristina Janolo. Her competition talent was ballet. Rutledge is a graduate of the University of Florida, having majored in broadcast journalism. She was also a member of the Zeta Tau Alpha sorority. She is currently working for ESPN and is featured in multiple shows, including the SEC Network's college football pre-game show, SEC Nation, and NFL Live.

== Sports journalist ==
Rutledge worked for Fox Sports as a sideline reporter, previously covering Fox broadcasts of Tampa Bay Rays games and then San Diego Padres games. She also provided on-field reporting for the Fox College Sports coverage of the NCPA's 2012 National Paintball Championship in Lakeland, Florida. She joined ESPN and the SEC Network in summer 2014.

In 2014, Rutledge hosted the Coors Light PostGame show on Fox College Football and hosted halftime programming for FSN college football games.

Rutledge also hosted Chargers Insider for the San Diego Chargers in 2013 and SD Live. She was the producer and host of SDLive, an original show she started at Fox Sports San Diego.

On May 16, 2017, she was named host of SEC Nation on the SEC Network. On August 17, 2020, she became the host of ESPN's premier NFL show, NFL Live. In August 2025, Rutledge was named as a full-time co-sideline reporter with Lisa Salters on Monday Night Football. Given the challenges of juggling between college football and the NFL, she made the decision to step away from SEC Nation in 2026.

== Personal life ==
Rutledge attended Celebration High School in Celebration, Florida. She married Josh Rutledge, then a professional baseball player, in 2013. On October 2, 2019, Rutledge gave birth to a daughter, Reese Katherine Rutledge, and revealed that she and her daughter share the same birthday. On May 25, 2023, Rutledge gave birth to their second child and first son, Jack Alexander Rutledge. They live in a log cabin in suburban Connecticut that was purchased for $1.1M in 2021.

In 2017, Rutledge's younger brother Alex McKeeman died in a cave diving accident in Silver Glen Springs, Florida, at the age of 25. He went missing on December 29, 2017, when his car and belongings were discovered to still be at the park on a day that it was closed. The Marion County Sheriff's Office said evidence at the scene led them to believe he entered the springs but did not come out. After a 4-day search by the Sheriff's Office and other professional divers turned up nothing, the search was suspended. The Sheriff's Office requested another search of the springs be conducted by a fresh set of eyes, and he was discovered on January 17, 2018, wedged between two rocks roughly ten inches apart.

Awards and achievements
| Preceded by Kristina Janolo | Miss Florida; 2012 | Succeeded by Myrrhanda Jones |
