= Two Nudes Bathing =

1995 film

- Directed by: John Boorman
- Written by: John Boorman
- Produced by: John Boorman, Scott JT Frank, Dan Halperin, David Wachs
- Starring: John Hurt
- Cinematography: Seamus Deasy
- Edited by: Ron Davis
- Release date: 1995
- Running time: 35 minutes
- Country: United Kingdom
- Language: English

Two Nudes Bathing is a 1995 short film created as part of the Showtime television series Picture Windows. It was written, produced and directed by John Boorman, other producers include Scott JT Frank, Dan Halperin, and David Wachs. The film stars John Hurt and was screened in the Un Certain Regard section at the 1995 Cannes Film Festival.

== Cast ==
- John Hurt as Marquis de Prey
- Charley Boorman as The Painter
- Angeline Ball as Simone
- Jocelyne West as Gabrielle
- Juliette Caton as Blanche
- Britta Bates as Nana
