= Laurie Gray (Miss Rhode Island) =

Laurie Gray is one of only a few Harvard graduates to compete in Miss America, appearing in 2004. She represented Rhode Island, and was the first Miss Rhode Island to finish in the top 10 in Miss America since the 1950s. She has demonstrated her skills, winning the talent competition in Miss America, and finishing with highest honors at Harvard (undergrad), and finishing with honors from the University of Pennsylvania Medical School. She was later chief resident in psychiatry for the University of Pennsylvania Health System. In July 2012, she is to become a psychiatry fellow at the Cambridge Health Alliance.

== Personal life ==
Gray is the daughter of Shirley and Donald Gray of Warwick, Rhode Island and she married Benjamin Shiller in 2012.

Gray was a violinist and concertmaster of the Harvard Bach Society Orchestra and promoted music education as her pageant platform. Fellow contestant Nancy Redd, Miss Virginia, graduated from Harvard in the same year and the reigning (at that time) Miss America, Erika Harold, had been admitted to Harvard Law School.
