= Miss Florida =

American beauty pageant in Florida

- Formation: 1922
- Type: Beauty pageant
- Headquarters: Lakeland
- Location: Florida
- Members: Miss America
- Official language: English
- Key people: Keith Williams (Executive Director)
- Website: Official website

The Miss Florida competition is the pageant that selects the representative for the state of Florida in the Miss America pageant. Florida has twice won the Miss America crown.

In the fall of 2018, the Miss America Organization terminated Miss Florida organization's license as well as licenses from Georgia, New Jersey, New York, Pennsylvania, Tennessee, and West Virginia. In December 2018, the Miss America Organization reinstated licensing for the Miss Florida Scholarship Pageant Inc., along with the organizations in Georgia, Pennsylvania, Tennessee, and West Virginia.

Alexandra de Roos of Winter Haven was crowned Miss Florida on June 27, 2026, at the RP Funding Center's Youkey Theatre in Lakeland, Florida. She competed for the title of Miss America 2027 on September 6, 2026, at the Kravis Center for the Performing Arts in West Palm Beach, Florida.

== Gallery of past titleholders ==
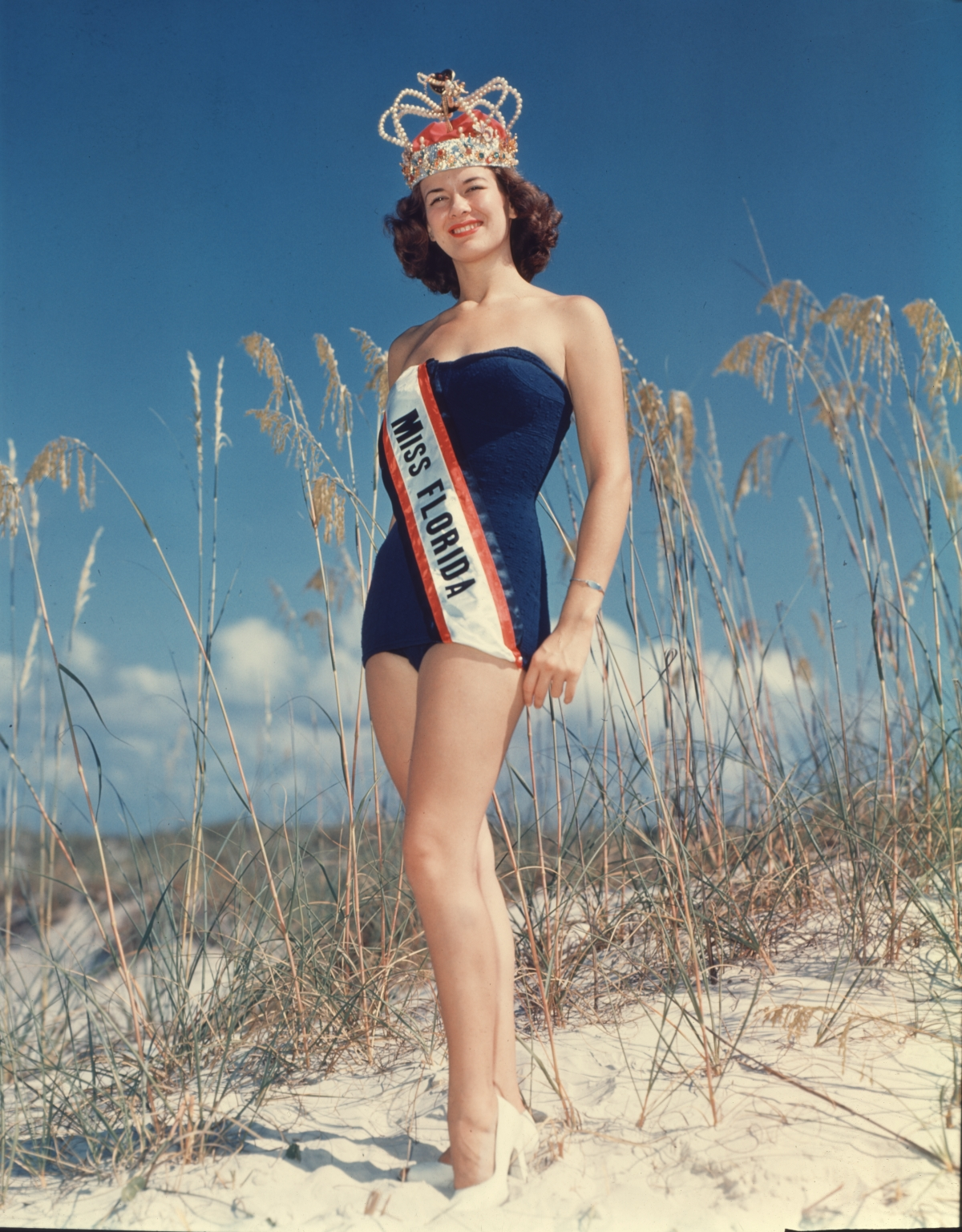
Rosemary Carpenter,
Miss Florida 1948

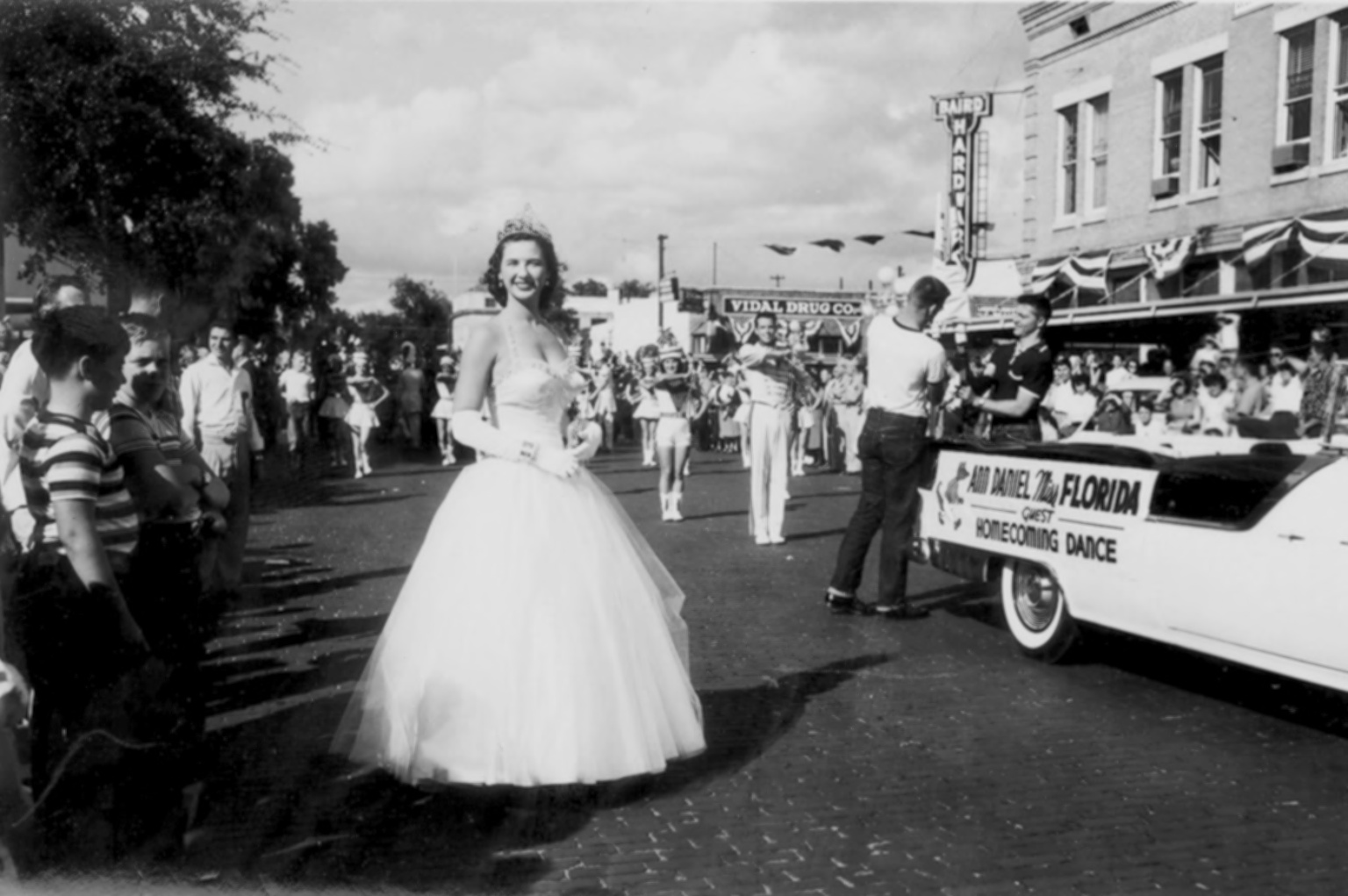
Ann Gloria Daniel,
Miss Florida 1954

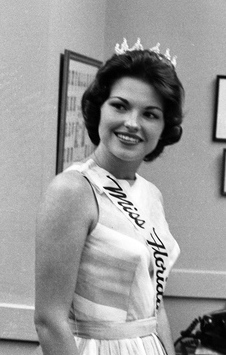
Sherry Grimes,
Miss Florida 1961

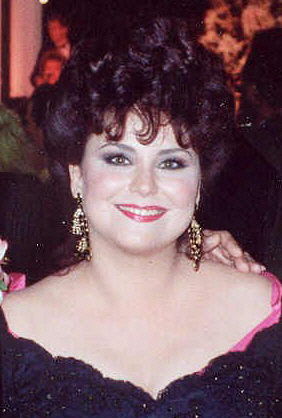
Delta Burke,
Miss Florida 1974 in 1990

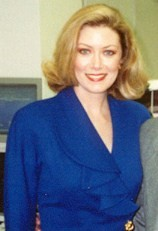
Nancy Stafford,
Miss Florida 1976

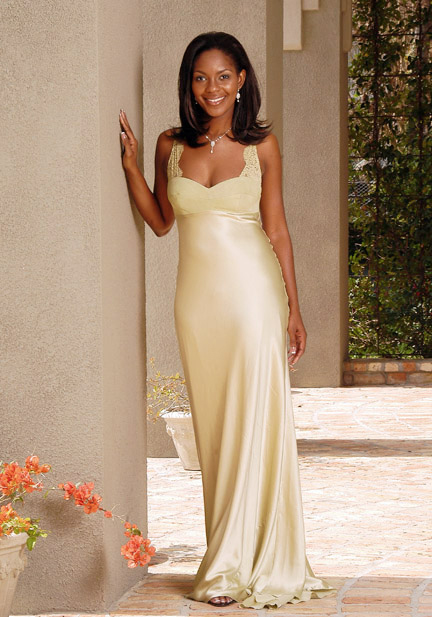
Ericka Dunlap,
Miss Florida 2003 and Miss America 2004

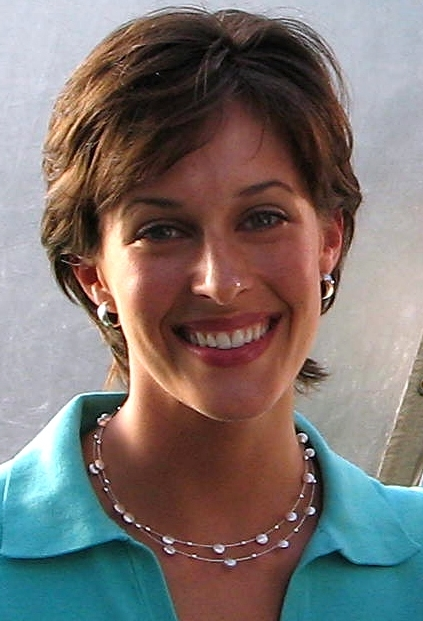
Jenna Edwards,
Miss Florida 2004

Allison Kreiger,
Miss Florida 2006

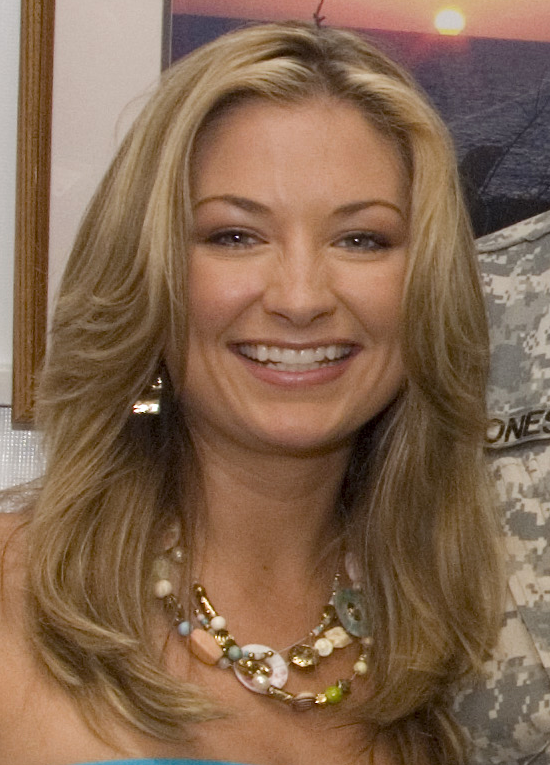
Kylie Williams,
Miss Florida 2007

== Results summary ==
The following is a visual summary of the past results of Miss Florida titleholders at the national Miss America pageants/competitions. The year in parentheses indicates the year of the national competition during which a placement and/or award was garnered, not the year attached to the contestant's state title.

=== Placements ===
- Miss Americas: Leanza Cornett (1993), Ericka Dunlap (2004)
- 1st runners-up: Muriel Elizabeth Smith (1943), Ann Gloria Daniel (1955)
- 2nd runners-up: Virginia Warlen (1944), Janet Ruth Crockett (1951), Carolyn Cline (1979), Lissette Gonzalez (1999), Paris Richardson (2026)
- 3rd runners-up: Virginia Freeland (1945), Carol Lynn Blum (1966), Myrrhanda Jones (2014), Victoria Cowen (2015), Taylor Tyson (2019), Casana Fink (2025)
- 4th runners-up: Irmigard Dietel (1937), Gloria Smyley (1938), Mary Elizabeth Godwin (1952), Dorothy Maria Steiner (1958), Dawn Cashwell (1968), Cathy La Belle (1978), Marti Sue Phillips (1980), Sierra Minott (2009)
- Top 10: Leona Fredericks (1942), Eileen Knapp (1942), Sandra Wirth (1956), Diane Colston (1967), Linda Fitts (1969), Lisa Donovan (1971), Ann K. Schmalzried (1976), Kim Boyce (1984), Jennifer Anne Sauder (1988), Melissa Aggeles (1989), Sandra Joanne Frick (1990), Christy Neuman (1998), Kelly Gaudet (2002), Mari Wilensky (2006), Mary Katherine Fechtel (2016), Leah Roddenberry (2022), Juliette Valle (2024)
- Top 12: Elizabeth Hull (1935), Vernell Bush (1944)
- Top 13: Kristina Janolo (2012)
- Top 15: Ruth Wooddall (1925), Mary Jane Thomas (1938), Irmigard Dietel (1939), Rose Marie Magrill (1939), Mitzi Strother (1940 and 1941), Pepper Shore (1947), Rosemary Carpenter (1948), Michaela McLean (2020)
- Top 16: Jacquelyn Jennings (1946), Kylie Williams (2008), Laura McKeeman (2013)

=== Awards ===
==== Preliminary awards ====
- Preliminary Lifestyle and Fitness: Virginia Warlen (1944), Ann Gloria Daniel (1955), Melissa Aggeles (1989), Dana Rinehart Dalton (1991), Lissette Gonzalez (1999), Jenna Edwards (2005), Victoria Cowen (2015), Mary Katherine Fechtel (2016), Sara Zeng (2018)
- Preliminary Talent: Gloria Smyley (1938), Virginia Warlen (1944), Pepper Shore (1947), Sandra Wirth (1956), Dawn Lauree Cashwell (1968), Linda Fitts (1969), Lisa Donovan (1971), Cathy La Belle (1978), Carolyn Cline (1979), Christy Neuman (1998), Myrrhanda Jones (2014), Taylor Tyson (2019)
- Preliminary Evening Gown: Kelly Gaudet (2002)
- Preliminary Fitness: Paris Richardson (2026)

==== Non-finalist awards ====
- Non-finalist Talent: Barbara Jo Ivey (1972), Ellen Meade (1974), Delta Burke (1975), Monica Farrell (1986), Molly Pesce (1987), Mary Ann Olson (1992), Jamie Bolding (1997)
- Non-finalist Interview: Megan Welch (1995), Jamie Bolding (1997)
- Non-finalist Social Impact Pitch: Lindsay Bettis (2023)

==== Other awards ====
- Equity and Justice Finalist: Leah Roddenberry (2022), Lindsay Bettis (2023)
- Bernie Wayne Talent Award: Lissette Gonzalez (1999)
- Charles & Theresa Brown Scholarship: Victoria Cowen (2015)
- Dr. David B. Allman Medical Scholarship: Ann K. Schmalzried (1976), Ameigh Verderosa Worley (2006)
- Final Night Evening Gown Award: Ericka Dunlap (2004)
- Final Night Talent Award: Ericka Dunlap (2004)
- Jean Bartel Social Impact Initiative Finalist: Leah Roddenberry (2022)
- Quality of Life Award 1st runners-up: Kylie Williams (2008)
- Quality of Life Award Finalists: Jenna Edwards (2005), Jaclyn Raulerson (2011)
- Women in Business Finalists: Lindsay Bettis (2023)
- Quality of Life Award Winners: Paris Richardson (2026), Alexandra de Roos (2027)

== Winners ==
- Declared as winner
- Ended as a runner-up
- Ended as a finalist or semi-finalist

Year	Name	Hometown	Age	Local Title	Miss America Talent	Placement at Miss America	Special scholarships at Miss America	Notes
2026	Alexandra de Roos	Winter Haven	23	Miss Manatee	Classical Ballet		Quality of Life Award Winner	
2025	Paris Richardson	Jacksonville	23	Miss Gainesville	Acrobatic/Jazz Dance	2nd Runner-Up	Preliminary Fitness Award Quality of Life Award Winner	
2024	Casana Fink	Ocala	25	Miss Tampa	Lyrical Dance, "Rescue"	3rd Runner-up	Preliminary Evening Gown Award	
2023	Juliette Valle	Plantation	22	Miss Orlando	Operatic Vocal, "Sempre Libera" from La Traviata by Giuseppe Verdi	Top 10		The second Hispanic Miss Florida to be crowned in 87 years The first Miss America contestant to deliver a bilingual onstage question response onstage
2022	Lindsay Bettis	Ponte Vedra Beach	26	Miss Seminole County	Jazz Dance		Women in Business Finalist Equity & Justice Finalist Non-finalist Social Impact Pitch Award	
2021	Leah Roddenberry	Bradenton	22	Miss Tampa	Dance	Top 10	Equity and Justice Finalist Jean Bartel Social Impact Initiative Finalist	Previously Miss Florida's Outstanding Teen 2013 and 2015 First teen titleholder to hold the state title twice
2019–20	Michaela McLean	Clermont	21	Miss Florida Citrus	Lyrical Dance, "You Say"	Top 15		Previously Miss Florida's Outstanding Teen 2014; Top 12 at Miss America's Outstanding Teen 2015 pageant
2018	Taylor Tyson	Jupiter	23	Miss South Florida Fair	Classical Piano, "Mephisto's Waltz" by Franz Liszt	3rd runner-up	Preliminary Talent Award	Accepted to Stetson University College of Law
2017	Sara Zeng	Palm Coast	22	Miss Heart of Florida	Classical Piano, "Fantaisie-Impromptu" in C Sharp minor by Frédéric Chopin		Preliminary Lifestyle & Fitness Award	
2016	Courtney Sexton	Starke	23	Miss Orlando	Jazz Dance, "I Got Love"			Previously Miss Florida's Outstanding Teen 2008 Top 10 at National Sweetheart 2015 pageant
2015	Mary Katherine Fechtel	Leesburg	19	Miss University of Florida	Lyrical Dance, "Bridge Over Troubled Water" by Tessanne Chin	Top 10	Preliminary Lifestyle & Fitness Award	Sister of Miss America's Outstanding Teen 2012, Elizabeth Fechtel Previously Miss Florida's Outstanding Teen 2010
2014	Victoria Cowen	Panama City	21	Miss North Florida	Lyrical Dance, "Note to God"	3rd runner-up	Charles & Theresa Brown Scholarship Preliminary Lifestyle & Fitness Award	Originally first runner-up, assumed title after tabulation error resulted in Fechtel incorrectly being named the winner
2014	Elizabeth Fechtel	Leesburg	20	Miss University of Florida	Dance, "Happy" by Pharrell Williams	Did not compete; dethroned after a tabulation error was corrected		
2014	Elizabeth Fechtel	Leesburg	20	Miss University of Florida	Dance, "Happy" by Pharrell Williams			Sister of Miss Florida 2015, Mary Katherine Fechtel Previously Miss America's Outstanding Teen 2012
2013	Myrrhanda Jones	Gainesville	19	Miss Palm Coast	Baton, "Big Noise from Winnetka"	3rd runner-up	Preliminary Talent Award	Previously Miss Florida's Outstanding Teen 2009; 2nd runner-up at Miss America's Outstanding Teen 2009 pageant
2012	Laura McKeeman	St. Petersburg	23	Miss Pinellas County	Ballet, La Esmeralda	Top 16		Former reporter on and current host of SEC Nation on ESPN
2011	Kristina Janolo	Kissimmee	24	Miss Winter Park	Vocal, "Gold"	Top 13		Contestant at National Sweetheart 2009 pageant
2010	Jaclyn Raulerson	Plant City	19	Miss Largo	Vocal, "I Don't Want to Miss a Thing"		Quality of Life Award Finalist	
2009	Rachael Todd	Oviedo	22	Miss Suncoast	Irish Step Dance, "Riverdance"			
2008	Sierra Minott	Fort Myers	20	Miss Palm Beach County	Theater Style Dance, "I Can Cook Too" from On the Town	4th runner-up		Previously Miss Florida's Outstanding Teen 2005; 3rd runner-up at Miss America's Outstanding Teen 2005
2007	Kylie Williams	Tallahassee	24	Miss Tallahassee	Country Vocal, "I Want to Be a Cowboy's Sweetheart"	Top 16	Quality of Life Award 1st runner-up	
2006	Allison Kreiger	Miami	23	Miss Miami	Dance / Twirl, "I Will Live For Love"			
2005	Mari Wilensky	Jacksonville	21	Miss University of Florida	Vocal, "Bridge Over Troubled Water"	Top 10		Top 10 at National Sweetheart 2005 pageant Assumed the crown when Cragg relinquished title
2005	Candace Cragg	Jacksonville		Miss Jacksonville		Did not compete; relinquished title when it was discovered she was not enrolled at the university where she won her local title		
2004	Jenna Edwards	Miami	23	Miss Winter Park	Popular Vocal, "Solitaire"		Preliminary Swimsuit Award Quality of Life Award Finalist	Later Miss Florida USA 2007
2003	Shauna Pender			Miss St. Petersburg		Did not compete; originally 1st runner-up, later assumed title after Dunlap won Miss America 2004		
2003	Shauna Pender			Miss St. Petersburg				Top 10 at National Sweetheart 2001 pageant
2003	Ericka Dunlap	Orlando	21	Miss City Beautiful	Vocal, "If I Could"	Winner	Finals Evening Gown Award Finals Talent Award	First African American to win the title of Miss Florida
2002	Katherine Carson	Sarasota	20	Miss Largo	Vocal, "Gimme, Gimme" from Thoroughly Modern Millie			
2001	Kelly Gaudet	Miami	22	Miss Largo	Lyrical Dance, "It's Time"	Top 10	Preliminary Evening Gown Award	Previously Miss Florida Teen USA 1996 4th runner-up at National Sweetheart 1999 pageant
2000	Candace Rodatz	Orange Park	24	Miss First Coast	Baton, "Sing, Sing, Sing"			
1999	Kelli Meierhenry	Orlando, Florida	24	Miss University of Central Florida	Vocal, "What Will I Tell My Heart?"			
1998	Lissette Gonzalez	Miami	22	Miss Miami	Vocal, "All That Jazz"	2nd runner-up	Bernie Wayne Talent Award Preliminary Swimsuit Award	
1997	Christy Neuman	Jacksonville	20	Miss University of North Florida	Rhythmic Gymnastics Dance, Theme from Robin Hood: Prince of Thieves	Top 10	Preliminary Talent Award	
1996	Jamie Bolding	Lakeland	22	Miss Mount Dora	Lyrical Ballet, "Can You Read My Mind"		Non-finalist Interview Award Non-finalist Talent Award	
1995	Kristin Ludecke	Eustis	19	Miss Central Florida	Classical Vocal, "O Luce di Quest'anima" from Linda di Chamounix			Later Miss Florida USA 2000
1994	Megan Welch	DeLand	20	Miss Mount Dora	Classical Vocal		Non-finalist Interview Award	Previously National Sweetheart 1993
1993	Nicole Padgett	Fort Myers	21	Miss Tampa	Vocal, "You're Gonna Hear From Me" from Inside Daisy Clover			
1992	Melinda Miller			Miss Altamonte Springs		Did not compete; later assumed title when Cornett won Miss America 1993		
1992	Leanza Cornett	Jacksonville	21	Miss Winter Park	Vocal, "A New Life" from Jekyll & Hyde	Winner		Previously National Sweetheart 1991
1991	Mary Ann Olson	Sarasota	24	Miss Manatee County	Vocal, "Where the Boys Are"		Non-finalist Talent Award	
1990	Dana Rinehart Dalton	Orlando	23	Miss Orlando	Dramatic Vocal, "If He Walked Into My Life" from Mame		Preliminary Swimsuit Award	
1989	Sandra Joanne Frick	Hialeah	23	Miss Coral Springs	Character Ballet en Pointe, "Yankee Doodle Dandy"	Top 10		
1988	Melissa Aggeles	St. Petersburg	24	Miss Manatee County	Vocal / Dance, "Show Stopper"	Top 10	Preliminary Swimsuit Award	Previously National Sweetheart 1987
1987	Jennifer Anne Sauder	Homestead	22	Miss Homestead	Semi-classical Vocal, "If We Were In Love" from Yes, Giorgio	Top 10		
1986	Molly Pesce	Longwood	23	Miss Seminole County	Vocal medley from Cabaret		Non-finalist Talent Award	
1985	Monica Bruni Farrell	Jacksonville	21	Miss Jacksonville University	Classical Piano, "Prelude No. 5 in G Minor" by Sergei Rachmaninoff		Non-finalist Talent Award	Sister of Miss New York 1984, Mary-Ann Farrell, and Miss Illinois 1992, Kathleen Farrell Later Miss Florida USA 1988; 3rd runner-up at Miss USA 1988 pageant Aunt of Miss Ohio 2022, Elizabetta Nies
1984	Lisa Valdez	Bradenton	21	Miss Manatee County	Vocal, "Through the Eyes of Love"			
1983	Kim Boyce	Bradenton	22	Miss Manatee County	Popular Vocal, "Rainbow Connection" & "Over the Rainbow"	Top 10		
1982	Deanna Pitman	Apopka	22	Miss Sanford	Lyrical Dance, "I Hope I Get It" from A Chorus Line			
1981	Dean Herman	Jacksonville	23	Miss Jacksonville	Gymnastics Dance, "They're Playing Our Song"			
1980	Caroline Dungan	Bradenton	21	Miss Manatee County	Piano, "Deep Purple"			
1979	Marti Sue Phillips	Tampa	22	Miss Manatee County	Jazz Clarinet Medley, Rhapsody In Blue & "Begin the Beguine"	4th runner-up		
1978	Wendy Sue Cheatham	Bonita Springs		Miss Lee County		N/A		Initially was 2nd runner-up at Miss Florida 1978 pageant Assumed the crown after Cline relinquished the title to continue to pursue her career as a singer and musician in November 1978.
1978	Carolyn Cline	Brandon	25	Miss Tampa	Piano / Vocal, "Love Story"	2nd runner-up	Preliminary Talent Award	Previously Miss New Mexico USA 1973
1977	Cathy La Belle	Tampa	20	Miss Tampa	Popular Vocal, "He Touched Me" from Drat! The Cat!	4th runner-up	Preliminary Talent Award	
1976	Nancy Stafford	Ft. Lauderdale	22	Miss Ft. Lauderdale	Piano, "Send In the Clowns"			
1975	Ann K. Schmalzried	Ft. Lauderdale	19	Miss University of Florida	Classical Piano, "Gardens In the Rain"	Top 10	Dr. David B Allman Medical Scholarship	
1974	Delta Burke	Orlando	18	Miss Orlando	Dramatic monologue, "Anne Boleyn"		Non-finalist Talent Award	Later gained fame as an actress, most notably on Designing Women
1973	Ellen Meade	Bradenton	20	Miss Manatee County	Ballet Roller Skating, "The Black Swan"		Non-finalist Talent Award	Ellen Rowena Meade Thomas died in Bradenton, Florida, at age 70 on August 27, 2023.
1972	Suzanne Charles	Fort Lauderdale	20	Miss Miami	Ballet, "Dance of the Painted Doll"			
1971	Barbara Jo Ivey	Winter Park	19	Miss Winter Park	Piano, "Toccata"		Non-finalist Talent Award	
1970	Lisa Donovan	Sarasota	21	Miss Sarasota	Vocal, "Feeling Good"	Top 10	Preliminary Talent Award	
1969	Lynne Edea Topping	Marco Island	20	Miss Dade County	Ballet, "Kismet"			
1968	Linda Fitts	Panama City	20	Miss Panama City	Charleston Dance, "Twelfth Street Rag"	Top 10	Preliminary Talent Award	
1967	Dawn Cashwell	Pensacola	22	Miss Pensacola	Baton Twirling, "Blue Tango"	4th runner-up	Preliminary Talent Award	Contestant at National Sweetheart 1963 pageant, representing Georgia
1966	Christine Torgeson			Miss Manatee County		N/A		Assumed the crown after Colston relinquished the title
1966	Diane Colston	Sarasota	19	Miss Sarasota	Vocal, "Rock-a-Bye Your Baby with a Dixie Melody"	Top 10		Relinquished the title after competing at Miss America 1967 pageant
1965	Carol Lynn Blum	Miami Beach	21	Miss Fort Lauderdale	Classical Vocal, "Il Bacio" by Luigi Arditi	3rd runner-up		
1964	Priscilla Schnarr	Hollywood	18	Miss Hollywood	Vocal / Dance, "Whatever Lola Wants"			
1963	Flora Jo Chandonnet	North Miami		Miss Miami	Semi-classical Vocal, "One Kiss" from The New Moon			
1962	Gloria Brody	Jacksonville	19	Miss Duval County	Interpretive Ballet, Theme from "Exodus"			
1961	Sherry Jeanette Grimes	Sarasota	18	Miss Sarasota	Vocal, "My Man's Gone Now"			
1960	Kathy Magda	Fort Lauderdale	19	Miss Fort Lauderdale	Dramatic monologue from Our Town			
1959	Nancy Rae Purvis	Bradenton	18	Miss Bradenton	Dramatic monologue			
1958	Dianne Tauscher	Orlando		Miss Orlando	Ballet, "Canadian Sunset"			
1957	Dorothy Maria Steiner	Boca Raton		Miss Boca Raton	Dramatic reading, "Such Is Your Heritage"	4th runner-up		
1956	Sally Fisher	Miami		Miss Coral Gables	Vocal / Dance, "Life Upon the Wicked Stage" from Show Boat			
1955	Sandra Wirth	Miami		Miss Miami	Fire Baton, "Jazz Medley"	Top 10	Preliminary Talent Award	
1954	Gloria Ann Daniel	Dade City	21	Miss Dade City	Accordion, "Lady of Spain"	1st runner-up	Preliminary Swimsuit Award	Gloria Ann Daniel Adams died at age 93 on June 21, 2026 in Winter Haven, Florida.
1953	Marjorie Simmons	Tampa		Miss Tampa	Dance, "Slaughter on Tenth Avenue"			
1952	Marcia Crane	Orlando		Miss Gainesville	Piano, "Gershwin Prelude"			
1951	Mary Elizabeth Godwin	Gainesville		Miss University of Florida	Pantomime, "Betty Boop"	4th runner-up		
1950	Janet Ruth Crockett	St. Petersburg		Miss St. Petersburg	Vocal & Pantomime from The Perils of Pauline	2nd runner-up		Assumed title when Corine Gustafson was disqualified for being underage
1949	Shirley Ann Rhodes	Tampa		Miss Tampa	Vocal, "Put Your Shoes On, Lacy"			
1948	Rosemary Carpenter	Miami Beach		Miss Miami	Classical piano & accordion, "Fantasie Impromptu" & "Two Guitars"	Top 15		
1947	Eula Ann McGehee	St. Petersburg		Miss Florida	Magic act			Multiple Florida representatives Contestants competed under local title at Miss America pageant
1947	Pepper Shore	Miami		Miss Miami Beach	Interpretive dance of the South Seas	Top 15	Preliminary Talent Award	Multiple Florida representatives Contestants competed under local title at Miss America pageant
1946	Jacquelyn Jennings	Miami		Miss Florida	Pantomime, "Just a Square In a Social Circle"	Top 16		Multiple Florida representatives Contestants competed under local title at Miss America pageant
1946	Jini Boyd	Miami		Miss Miami Beach				Multiple Florida representatives Contestants competed under local title at Miss America pageant
1945	Virginia "Jeni" Freeland	Miami	19	Miss Florida	Fashion Show & Vocal, "Rum and Coca-Cola"	3rd runner-up		Multiple Florida representatives Contestants competed under local title at Miss America pageant
1945	Rae Evelyn Crist	Miami Beach	19	Miss Miami Beach				Multiple Florida representatives Contestants competed under local title at Miss America pageant
1944	Virginia Warlen			Miss Florida	Violin, "Intermezzo"	2nd runner-up	Preliminary Swimsuit Award Preliminary Talent Award	Multiple Florida representatives Contestants competed under local title at Miss America pageant
1944	Vernell Bush	Miami		Miss Miami	Vocal, "It Had to Be You"	Top 12		Multiple Florida representatives Contestants competed under local title at Miss America pageant
1943	Muriel Elizabeth Smith			Miss Florida	Acrobatic Baton	1st runner-up		Multiple Florida representatives Contestants competed under local title at Miss America pageant
1943	Dolly Bowles			Miss Miami				Multiple Florida representatives Contestants competed under local title at Miss America pageant
1942	Eileen Knapp			Miss Florida	Tap Dance, "Bye Bye Blues"	Top 10		Multiple Florida representatives Contestants competed under local title at Miss America pageant
1942	Leona Fredericks	Miami		Miss Miami	Vocal, "Nobody's Baby"	Top 10		Multiple Florida representatives Contestants competed under local title at Miss America pageant
1941	Mitzi Strother	Miami		Miss Florida		Top 15		Multiple Florida representatives Contestants competed under local title at Miss America pageant
1941	Anna Louise Baker	Miami		Miss Miami				Multiple Florida representatives Contestants competed under local title at Miss America pageant
1940	Mitzi Strother	Miami		Miss Miami		Top 15		Competed under local title at Miss America pageant
1939	Rose Marie Magrill	Miami		Miss Florida	Tap Dance	Top 15		Multiple Florida representatives Contestants competed under local title at Miss America pageant
1939	Irmigard Dietel	Miami		Miss Miami	Vocal Medley, "See You Again," "Blue Evening," & "Solitude"	Top 15		Multiple Florida representatives Contestants competed under local title at Miss America pageant
1938	Mary Joyce Walsh	Miami		Miss Florida	Vocal / Ballet			Multiple Florida representatives Contestants competed under local title at Miss America pageant
1938	Patricia Hollran			Miss Delray Beach	Vocal, "A-Tisket, A-Tasket"			Multiple Florida representatives Contestants competed under local title at Miss America pageant
1938	Mary Jane Thomas	Fort Lauderdale		Miss Fort Lauderdale		Top 15		Multiple Florida representatives Contestants competed under local title at Miss America pageant
1938	Gloria Smyley	Jacksonville		Miss Jacksonville	Acrobatic dance	4th runner-up	Preliminary Talent Award	Multiple Florida representatives Contestants competed under local title at Miss America pageant
1937	Mary P. Hollran	Delray Beach		Miss Delray Beach				Multiple Florida representatives Contestants competed under local title at Miss America pageant
1937	Frances Powell			Miss Jacksonville				Multiple Florida representatives Contestants competed under local title at Miss America pageant
1937	Irmigard Dietel			Miss Miami	Vocal	4th runner-up		Multiple Florida representatives Contestants competed under local title at Miss America pageant
1936	No Florida representative at Miss America pageant							
1935	Elizabeth Hull	Plant City		Miss Plant City	Vocal medley, "East of the Sun" & "When I Grow Too Old to Dream"	Top 12		
1934	No national pageant was held							
1933	No Florida representative at Miss America pageant							
1932	No national pageants were held							
1931	No national pageants were held							
1930	No national pageants were held							
1929	No national pageants were held							
1928	No national pageants were held							
1927	Marcia Hands			Miss Miami	N/A			Competed under local title at national pageant
1926	Margaret Jennell Tate				N/A			
1925	Ruth Wooddall			Miss Miami	N/A	Top 15		Multiple Florida representatives Contestants competed under local title at national pageant
1925	Lucy Davis Yonge			Miss Pensacola	N/A			Multiple Florida representatives Contestants competed under local title at national pageant
1924	Roberta Russell			Miss Jacksonville	N/A			Multiple Florida representatives Contestants competed under local title at national pageant
1924	Margaret Swindell			Miss Lakeland	N/A			Multiple Florida representatives Contestants competed under local title at national pageant
1924	Lottie Eitzen			Miss Pensacola	N/A			Multiple Florida representatives Contestants competed under local title at national pageant
1924	Virginia McRae			Miss Tampa	N/A			Multiple Florida representatives Contestants competed under local title at national pageant
1924	Frances Payne			Miss West Palm Beach	N/A			Multiple Florida representatives Contestants competed under local title at national pageant
1923	Alyce Phillips	Jacksonville		Miss Jacksonville	N/A			Multiple Florida representatives Contestants competed under local title at national pageant
1923	Mary Weaver	Lakeland		Miss Lakeland	N/A			Multiple Florida representatives Contestants competed under local title at national pageant
1923	Katherine Kyle	Miami		Miss Miami	N/A			Multiple Florida representatives Contestants competed under local title at national pageant
1923	Katherine Floyd	Pensacola		Miss Pensacola	N/A			Multiple Florida representatives Contestants competed under local title at national pageant
1922	Eleanor Logan	Jacksonville	19	–	N/A			Competed as Miss Florida at pageant
1921	No Florida representative at Miss America pageant							

== Executive director accusations ==
Mary Sullivan, the longtime executive director of Miss Florida until her resignation in 2018, was arrested in 2022 and accused of stealing around $100,000 from the program from 2011–2018. The arrest came after an investigation into past financial irregularities by the Board of Directors after her retirement. She was accused of redirecting non-profit donations intended for use on scholarships to her own account, which she spent on personal matters such as maid service and dating sites.
