= Ellen Meade =

American beauty pageant titleholder

Ellen Rowena Meade Thomas (November 5, 1952 – August 27, 2023) was an American beauty pageant titleholder who won Miss Florida 1973.

She was a 1970 graduate of Manatee High School in Bradenton, Florida.

== Miss Florida ==
At 20 years old, Ellen Meade won the title of Miss Manatee County. She then went on to compete in the Miss Florida pageant, where she was crowned Miss Florida, 1973. Following her state win, Meade headed to Atlantic City to represent Florida in the Miss America pageant. While she didn't take home the title of Miss America, she did grab a win with a talent award.

During her time as Miss Florida, Meade toured the state of Florida, emceeing and performing.

== Early career ==
Meade began training in the arts at the age of seven. Her training began as a student with the Florida Ballet in Sarasota, Florida. In her early years, she trained under the direction of Madam Jean Spear, who founded Sarasota's first professional ballet troupe in 1962. Meade studied five days a week in ballet as an elementary student and later began training as a roller skater, practicing for hours on a concrete slab her father built in the family's backyard.

By the time she was 12, Meade was competing in both state and regional skating championships and was headed for nationals. With a performance set to a backdrop of Stravinsky ballet, "Firebird," Meade competed in and won the North American National Championships at the age of 14.

At 16, and still a senior in high school, Meade had begun studying modeling and acting after being discovered by a talent scout and notably, had opened her first school for the arts—in her own backyard. Her love of the arts would continue to propel her into new arenas, and at 17, she was developing a growing interest in pageantry.

By the late 1960s, Meade began entering local and state-level pageants. She entered and won the state Roller Skating Beauty Queen title, at 17, then continued on to take the title of Roller Skating Queen of America at nationals. Mentored by Rene Hardin, she began by competing in several small local pageants and grabbed the title of Miss Manatee County at the age of 20.

Following her local win, Meade went on to compete in the Miss Florida pageant where she took the top honor, and was crowned Miss Florida, 1973. That year she represented her home state of Florida in the Miss America pageant, held in Atlantic City. Meade took home a win in the talent portion of the competition, but Rebecca Ann King was crowned Miss America 1974.

In 1974, Meade crowned Delta Burke as the new Miss Florida and helped prepare her for the Miss America Pageant, where Burke also won a talent award.

Meade has also appeared in print, on stage and in television and film during the course of her career.

== Miss Dogpatch USA ==
Following her reign as Miss Florida, Meade traveled to Arkansas to participate in the Miss Dogpatch USA pageant. She won the title of Miss Dogpatch USA and embarked on a year of travel around the country representing Dogpatch USA.

It was in Arkansas where she also met her future husband, Craig Thomas, who, at the time, was the star of the Li'l Abner show in the Dogpatch USA themepark.

== Professional life ==
Meade attended Manatee Junior College and went on to become a pageant coach. Meade mentored many pageant contestants, who went on to win national, state and local titles. She also produced, directed and emceed the Manatee County annual pageant as well as several other smaller pageants and served as a pageant judge throughout the nation.

Meade was the owner and director of Ellen Meade Studios and School of Creative Learning in Bradenton, Florida.

== Family ==
Bruce Meade, Ellen Meade's older brother, was inducted into the Independent Softball Association Hall of Fame in the Male Player Category in Fort Myers Beach, Florida. He has also been named to the All-World Tournament Team seven times. During his career, Bruce Meade appeared in nine ISA Super Major World Tournaments and three Senior World Tournaments.
