= Ericka Dunlap =

American model and entrepreneur

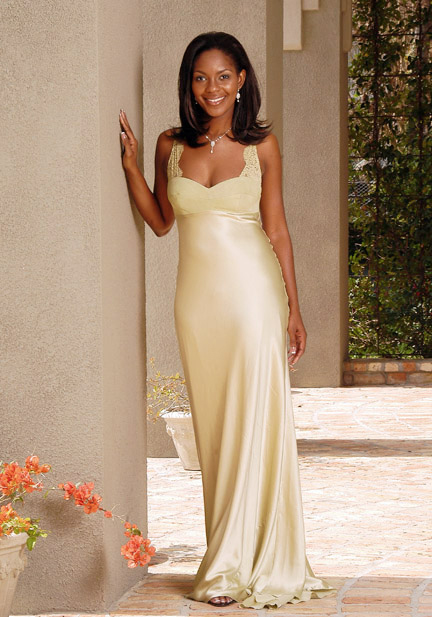
- Dunlap in 2004
- Born: December 29, 1981 (age 44); Orlando, Florida, U.S.
- Education: William R. Boone High School; University of Central Florida
- Title: Miss Orlando 2001; Miss Heart of Florida 2002; Miss City Beautiful 2003; Miss Florida 2003; Miss America 2004
- Term: September 20, 2003 – September 18, 2004
- Predecessor: Erika Harold
- Successor: Deidre Downs
- Spouse: Brian Kleinschmidt (m. 2007; div. 2011)
- Children: 1
- Website: http://www.erickadunlap.com/

Ericka Dunlap (born December 29, 1981) is an American beauty pageant titleholder from Orlando, Florida, who was named Miss Florida 2003 and subsequently crowned Miss America 2004. She was the first African American woman to be crowned Miss Florida in the Miss America pageant's 81-year history. Until the crowning of Paris Richardson as Miss Florida 2025, Dunlap was the only African American woman in the pageant's history to have been crowned Miss Florida.

== Early life and education ==
Dunlap is a native of Orlando, attended William R. Boone High School, and is a graduate of the University of Central Florida. While attending college at the University of Central Florida, she became a member of Delta Sigma Theta sorority.

== Career ==
In 2004, Dunlap was crowned Miss America, becoming the seventh African American woman to hold the title. Her platform was "United We Stand, Divided We Fall Behind: Celebrating Diversity and Inclusion." Dunlap appeared on The Oprah Winfrey Show, Hollywood Squares, Live With Regis and Kelly, and Fox News’ The O'Reilly Factor. She also served as grand marshal of the Talladega 500 NASCAR race. Dunlap has also appeared in a number of movies, including District 9.

Dunlap traveled to Kuwait in November 2003, during her reign as Miss America, to entertain and serve the American troops for Thanksgiving.

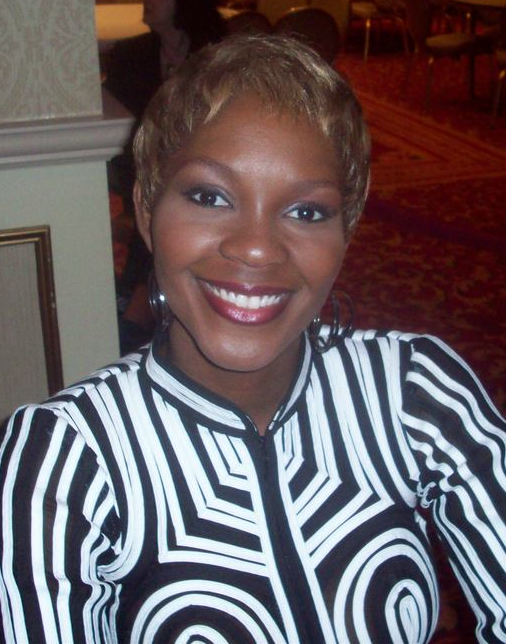
Dunlap in January 2008

Dunlap formed Crown Jewel Consulting to deliver public relations consulting. Her charitable organization, The Crown Jewel Foundation, promotes social development skills and image awareness in young girls.

Since the fall of 2013, Dunlap has been seen as a judge at The American Idol Experience at Disney's Hollywood Studios at Walt Disney World.

Dunlap ran for the Orlando City Commission, District 5 in 2017, but lost to incumbent Regina Hill. Seven years later, she partnered with Advil for the Pain Equity Project. In April of that year, Dunlap ran in the Orlando City Commissioner special election. She would obtain 459 votes in the general special election, just 37 votes from continuing into the final runoff election.

== Personal life ==
In 2009, Dunlap and her then-husband, Brian Kleinschmidt, appeared on The Amazing Race 15, where they placed third overall. She gave birth to a daughter in 2020 with former pageant contestant, Dr. Ameigh (Verderosa) Worley, as her physician.

Awards and achievements
Preceded by Erika Harold	Miss America; 2004	Succeeded by Deidre Downs
Preceded by Katherine Carson	Miss Florida; 2003	Succeeded by Shauna Pender
