= Miss Kentucky's Teen =

US beauty contest

Miss Kentucky’s Teen
- Formation: 1998
- Type: Beauty pageant
- Location: Louisville, Kentucky
- Members: Miss America's Teen
- Official language: English
- Key people: Destiny Lewis
- Website: Official website

The Miss Kentucky's Teen competition is the pageant that selects the representative for the U.S. state of Kentucky for the Miss America's Teen pageant.

Laken Blanford of Bardstown was crowned Miss Kentucky's Teen on June 12, 2026, at the Southern Kentucky Performing Arts Center (SKyPAC) in Bowling Green, Kentucky. She competed for the title of Miss America's Teen 2027 on September 5, 2026, at the Kravis Center for the Performing Arts in West Palm Beach, Florida.

In January 2023, the official name of the pageant was changed from Miss Kentucky's Outstanding Teen, to Miss Kentucky's Teen, in accordance with the national pageant.

== Results summary ==
The following is a visual summary of the past results of Miss Kentucky's Outstanding Teen titleholders presented in the table below. The year in parentheses indicates year of the Miss America's Outstanding Teen competition in which the placement and/or award was garnered.

=== Placements ===
- 2nd runners-up: Landry Feldmeier (2020)
- 4th runners-up: Ann-Blair Thornton (2008), Sophia Todd (2024)
- Top 10: Laura Jones (2011)
- Top 11: Annie Dauk (2023)

=== Awards ===
==== Preliminary awards ====
- Preliminary Evening Wear/On-Stage Question: Laura Jones (2011)
- Preliminary Talent: Annie Dauk (2023), Sophia Todd (2024)

==== Non-finalist awards ====
- Non-finalist Talent: Lauren Bohl (2013), Chapel Tinius (2017)

==== Other awards ====
- Outstanding Instrumental Talent: Laura Jones (2011), Lauren Bohl (2013), Chapel Tinius (2017)

== Winners ==
- Declared as Winner
- Ended as a runner-up
- Ended as a finalist or semi-finalist

Year	Name	Hometown	Age	Local title	Talent	Placement at MAO Teen	Special scholarships at MAO Teen	Notes
2026	Laken Blanford	Bardstown	15	Miss Mammoth Cave Area's Teen	Contemporary Dance			
2025	Blakely Callahan	London	16	Miss Heart of Bourbon Country's Teen	Opera			
2024	Mallory Jones	Winchester	16	Miss Danville's Teen	Vocal			
2023	Sophia Todd	Elizabethtown	17	Miss Heart of Bourbon Country's Teen	Speed Painting	4th Runner-Up	Preliminary Talent	
2022	Annie Dauk	Louisville	16	Miss Fleur de Lis' Outstanding Teen	Vocal	Top 11	Preliminary Talent Award	
2021	Chloe Yates	Prospect	17	Miss NuLu's Outstanding Teen	Gymnastics, "Ease on Down the Road"			Younger sister of Miss Alabama Volunteer 2022, Claire Yates. Competed at Miss Alabama 2023. Top 13 at Miss Alabama 2024 and 2025. Miss Gardendale Magnolia Festival 2026.
2019–20	Landry Feldmeier	Louisville	15	Miss Belle of Louisville's Outstanding Teen	Tap Dance, "Woman Up" by Meghan Trainor	2nd runner-up		
2018	Joanna Clark	Lexington	17	Miss Wayne County Area's Outstanding Teen	Piano, "Ode to Joy" by Beethoven			
2017	Abigail Quammen	Frankfort	17	Miss Capital City's Outstanding Teen	Vocal			Later Miss New York 2024; 4th runner-up at Miss Kentucky 2021; 1st runner-up at Miss Kentucky 2022
2016	Chapel Tinius	Bowling Green	16	Miss Horse Capital of the World's Outstanding Teen	Fiddle		Non-finalist Talent Award Outstanding Instrumental Talent Award	Later Distinguished Young Woman of Kentucky 2018 Later Miss Kentucky 2024
2015	Kennedy Sabharwal	Lexington	15	Miss Renfro Valley's Outstanding Teen	Vocal			
2014	Alex Francke	Lexington	17	Miss Ohio Valley's Outstanding Teen	Vocal			4th runner-up at National Sweetheart 2018 pageant Later Miss Kentucky 2019
2013	Laura Hancock	Eubank	15	Miss Monticello's Outstanding Teen	Piano			
2012	Lauren Bohl	Barbourville	16	Miss Cumberland Falls' Outstanding Teen	Piano		Non-finalist Talent Award Outstanding Instrumental Talent Award	
2011	Erynn Landherr	Louisville	16	Miss Louisville's Outstanding Teen				
2010	Laura Jones	Fisherville	17	Miss Louisville's Outstanding Teen	Violin	Top 10	Outstanding Instrumental Talent Award Preliminary Evening Wear/OSQ Award	Later Miss Kentucky 2016; Top 12 at the Miss America 2017 pageant
2009	Madison McCowan	London	17	Miss Bowling Green's Outstanding Teen	Theatrical Jazz Dance			
2008	Ashley Ferry	Louisville	17	Miss Thoroughbred's Outstanding Teen	Jazz Dance			4th runner-up at Miss Kentucky 2011, 2012, and 2014 pageants
2007	Ann-Blair Thornton	Bowling Green	17	Miss Elizabethtown Area's Outstanding Teen		4th runner-up		1st runner-up at National Sweetheart 2010 pageant Later Miss Kentucky 2011
2006	Alison Lovely	Salyersville	16	Miss Belle of the Bluegrass' Outstanding Teen	Vocal			Later Kentucky's Junior Miss 2008
2005	Erin Clark	Louisville	15	Miss Jeffersontown's Outstanding Teen	Musical Theater Dance			
2004	Madalyn Kamkar	Barbourville		Miss Cumberland Falls Teen		No national pageant Was previously an independent pageant with the winner earning the title of, "Miss Kentucky Teen" Changed to current title after a national pageant was created by the Miss America Organization in 2005		
2003	Sarah Billiter	Shelbiana	17	Miss East Kentucky Teen		No national pageant Was previously an independent pageant with the winner earning the title of, "Miss Kentucky Teen" Changed to current title after a national pageant was created by the Miss America Organization in 2005		2nd runner-up at Miss Kentucky 2008 pageant
2002	Megan Beiswenger	Sebree		Miss North Central Teen		No national pageant Was previously an independent pageant with the winner earning the title of, "Miss Kentucky Teen" Changed to current title after a national pageant was created by the Miss America Organization in 2005		
2001	Bethany Adkins	Pikeville		Miss Heart of Kentucky Teen		No national pageant Was previously an independent pageant with the winner earning the title of, "Miss Kentucky Teen" Changed to current title after a national pageant was created by the Miss America Organization in 2005		
2000	Stephanie Jaggers	Louisville		Miss Heart of Kentucky Teen	Vocal, "Home" from Beauty and the Beast	No national pageant Was previously an independent pageant with the winner earning the title of, "Miss Kentucky Teen" Changed to current title after a national pageant was created by the Miss America Organization in 2005		
1999	Maria Maldonado	Lexington		Miss Lexington Teen		No national pageant Was previously an independent pageant with the winner earning the title of, "Miss Kentucky Teen" Changed to current title after a national pageant was created by the Miss America Organization in 2005		Later Miss Kentucky 2004
1998	Monica Hardin	Louisville		Miss Louisville Teen		No national pageant Was previously an independent pageant with the winner earning the title of, "Miss Kentucky Teen" Changed to current title after a national pageant was created by the Miss America Organization in 2005		Later Miss Kentucky 2001
