= Alison McCreary =

- Born: June 3, 1974 (age 52); Florence, Alabama, U.S.
- Education: Samford University
- Beauty pageant titleholder
- Title: Miss Shoals Area 1994; Miss Point Mallard 1995; Miss Samford University 1996; Miss Alabama 1996
- Major competition: Miss America 1997

Alison McCreary Gengelbach (born June 3, 1974) is an American beauty pageant titleholder from Florence, Alabama, who was named Miss Alabama 1996. She won the Quality of Life award and was named third runner-up at the Miss America 1997 pageant.

== Pageant career ==
In November 1993 as a sophomore at Samford University, McCreary was crowned Miss Shoals Area 1994. She performed "Because of Who You Are", a song made famous by Sandi Patty, during the talent portion of the Miss Alabama competition. McCreary was second runner-up for the title and "Miss Congeniality" but the state crown went to eventual Miss America 1995 Heather Whitestone.

In July 1994, McCreary won the Miss Point Mallard 1995 title then, in June 1995, competed in the 1995 Miss Alabama pageant. She was named first runner-up to winner Leigh Sherer.

In October 1995, McCreary was crowned Miss Samford University 1996 which made her eligible to compete at the 1996 Miss Alabama pageant. Entering the state pageant in June 1996 as one of finalists, McCreary's preliminary competition talent for Miss Alabama was singing the gospel hymn "How Great Thou Art" in a contemporary Christian arrangement. She won the Thursday preliminary talent competition and tied with Christy Booker, Miss Auburn University, in the Friday preliminary swimsuit competition. Her platform was hospice care, emphasizing "grief support among youthful survivors", because of personal experiences with family members who benefited from hospice. McCreary won the competition on Saturday, June 15, 1996, when she received her crown from outgoing Miss Alabama titleholder Leigh Sherer. She earned more than $26,000 in scholarship money from the state pageant.

As Miss Alabama, her activities included public appearances across the state of Alabama, including an "Alison McCreary Day" celebration in her hometown of Florence. On July 27, 1996, McCreary was honored by the Shoals Chamber of Commerce and presented with a key to the city of Florence, Alabama, by Mayor Eddie Frost.

McCreary was Alabama's representative at the Miss America 1997 pageant in Atlantic City, New Jersey, in September 1996. Her competition talent was singing the gospel hymn "How Great Thou Art". She was third runner-up for the national title and received a $15,000 scholarship prize. She also won the Quality of Life award and an additional $10,000 scholarship for her community service work related to hospice care. Her reign as Miss Alabama continued until Beth Stomps was crowned on June 14, 1997.

== Personal life and education ==
McCreary is a native of Florence, Alabama, and attended Coffee High School in Florence. Her father is Marc McCreary and her mother is Donna (Fortenberry) McCreary. She has two sisters, Leah and Ashley. As a young child, McCreary got a fortune from a package of Bazooka bubble gum that said, "You will be Miss America."

In February 1989, McCreary won the Miss Coffee High School pageant. In mid-1990, she and several classmates visited the Soviet Union as part of a glasnost-era student exchange program. In December 1990, McCreary was named state champion in original oratory speech during a statewide drama competition. In May 1991, McCreary was elected senior class vice-president for the upcoming school year.

Between her junior and senior years, McCreary participated in the Musical Theater Project of Tampa, Florida, where she received training and instruction from Ann Reinking, Tommy Tune, Stephanie Zimbalist, and other Broadway theatre professionals. McCreary graduated from Coffee High School in 1992.

She spent one year at the Texas Bible Institute in Columbus, Texas, before transferring to Samford University in Birmingham, Alabama. She earned a bachelor's degree in human development and family studies from Samford in 1998.

McCreary worked at Eli Lilly and Company from 2000 through 2013. She married Brandom Gengelbach on March 8, 2008. They have two sons, Tyler and William, and reside in Bentonville, Arkansas.

Awards and achievements
Preceded by Leigh Sherer	Miss Alabama; 1996	Succeeded by Beth Stomps
