= Amie Beth Dickinson =

American activist

- Born: 1971 or 1972 (age 53–54); Shelby County, Alabama, U.S.
- Education: Samford University
- Beauty pageant titleholder
- Title: Miss Shelby County 1992; Miss East Alabama 1993; Miss Samford University 1994; Miss Alabama 1994

Amie Beth Dickinson Shaver is an American conservative political activist and beauty pageant titleholder from Shelby County, Alabama, who was named Miss Alabama 1994. She succeeded to the title after Heather Whitestone, the original titleholder, was named Miss America 1995.

== Pageant career ==
Dickinson was crowned Miss Shelby County 1992 and competed in the 1992 Miss Alabama pageant. Dickinson earned the Miss East Alabama 1993 title and competed in the 1993 Miss Alabama pageant. In a field of 45 contestants, she was named fourth runner-up to winner Kalyn Chapman.

Dickinson was named Miss Samford University 1994 which made her eligible to compete at the 1994 Miss Alabama pageant. Entering the state pageant in June 1994 as one of 45 finalists, Dickinson's platform was promoting abstinence before marriage. Dickinson was named first runner-up at the competition to Heather Whitestone on Saturday, June 18, 1994. After Whitestone was crowned Miss America 1995 on September 17, 1994, Dickinson was elevated to the Miss Alabama title.

As Miss Alabama, her activities included public appearances across the state of Alabama, including hosting scholarship pageants and speaking to youth groups. Her reign as Miss Alabama continued until Leigh Sherer was crowned on June 17, 1995.

== Personal life and education ==
Amie Beth Dickinson is a native of Shelby County, Alabama, and graduated from Briarwood Christian School in Birmingham in 1990. She is the adopted daughter of Dr. Douglas Dickinson, a gastroenterologist at Brookwood Medical Center, and Barbara Dickinson. She earned a bachelor's degree in public relations and communications from Samford University in 1994.

Dickinson married Dr. Chris Shaver on May 10, 1997. They have four children (Emmy, Wesley Kate, Will, and Molly) and reside in Inverness, an unincorporated community in Shelby County, Alabama, and suburb of Birmingham.

== Political activism ==
In January 1996, Dickinson co-authored Who Moved the Line?: America's Character Crisis about faith, politics, motherhood, and other topics. This led to a national speaking tour where she expressed her views on abstinence, teen sexuality, and a variety of conservative political topics.

Dickinson became a consultant with the Austin, Texas-based Medical Institute of Sexual Health and a volunteer with Sex and Family Education (SAFE). Over the next several years, she became the spokesperson for several conservative groups in Alabama and a fixture on talk radio programs. On November 6, 2012, she was mistress of ceremonies for the Alabama Republican Party's election night celebration at a shooting range in Hoover, Alabama.

In November 2013, using her married name, Amie Beth Shaver declared her candidacy as a Republican for Alabama House District 43. One of 7 candidates vying for the Republican slot on the ballot, she won 22.5% of the vote in the June 2014 primary and qualified for the July 15, 2014 runoff. She was defeated in the runoff by Arnold Mooney.

=== Abortion ===
On September 22, 2020, Dickinson appeared in Birmingham alongside political activists including Alveda King to present the Equality Proclamation. The document, signed on the 158th anniversary of the Emancipation Proclamation's signing, argued that the tactics and locations of abortion providers like Planned Parenthood were racially discriminatory. Dickinson spoke at the event, referencing Planned Parenthood founder Margaret Sanger.

According to a document distributed by the group, Dickinson and the other signees believed that “the targeted practices of Alabama abortion providers are both discriminatory and disproportionately harmful to black mothers and their babies” and that a legal case could be made against abortion using the Tenth Amendment.

== Bibliography ==
- Dickinson, Amie Beth; George, Denise (January 1, 1996). Who Moved the Line?: America's Character Crisis. Buck Publishing Company. ISBN 978-0-934-53010-1.

Awards and achievements
Preceded by Heather Whitestone	Miss Alabama; 1994*	Succeeded by Leigh Sherer
