= Cris Crotz =

Miss Nevada 2010

- Born: Cristina Marie Crotz; April 26, 1986 (age 40); San Diego, California, U.S.
- Education: Steamboat Springs High School; College of Southern Nevada; Fashion Institute of Design & Merchandising
- Beauty pageant titleholder
- Title: Miss Mesquite 2009; Miss Southern Counties 2010; Miss Nevada 2010
- Hair color: Blonde
- Eye color: Green
- Major competitions: Miss Nevada 2009; Miss America 2011

Cristina Marie Crotz (born April 26, 1986) is a former American beauty pageant titleholder from Mesquite, Nevada who was named Miss Nevada 2010.

== Biography ==
Crotz won the title of Miss Nevada on July 3, 2010, when she received her crown from outgoing titleholder Christina Keegan. She was cast as one of the contestants on ABC's murder mystery reality game show Whodunnit?, and at the end of the season she was revealed to be "the killer."

Awards and achievements
Preceded by Christina Keegan	Miss Nevada; 2010	Succeeded by Alana Lee
