= Kim Wimmer =

American actress (born 1970)

- Born: December 25, 1970 (age 55); Mobile, Alabama, U.S.
- Education: Birmingham–Southern College, The University of Pennsylvania
- Height: 5 ft 4 in (1.63 m)
- Spouse: Mark Totty (m. 2002)
- Beauty pageant titleholder
- Title: Alabama's Junior Miss 1989; Miss Leeds Area 1991; Miss Point Mallard 1992; Miss Alabama 1992
- Hair color: Brown
- Eye color: Green
- Major competition: Miss America 1993

Kimberly Marie Wimmer (born December 25, 1970) is an American actress, singer, and educator from Mobile, Alabama, who was crowned Miss Alabama 1992. She competed for the Miss America 1993 title and won the pageant's Quality of Life Award. She co-starred in the Comedy Central series Strip Mall.

== Career ==
As an actress, Wimmer has appeared on stage and screen. She began her acting career working in Disney shows in Florida, Japan, New York and California. She appeared off-Broadway in Mr. Pimm Passes By as well as at regional theaters around the country, including Yale Rep (First Lady) and Indiana Rep (world premiere of Les Trois Dumas).

She is best known for her co-starring role as "Elyce Cantwell" in the Comedy Central sitcom Strip Mall for two seasons from 2000 through 2001 and her role in the 1999 comedy film Lucid Days in Hell. She has also made guest appearances on American television series including NCIS, Power Rangers Lost Galaxy, Silk Stalkings, and Touched by an Angel. As lead singer of her band, Clockwork, she was a performer-in-residence at both the Bellagio and the Mirage in Las Vegas.

Wimmer teaches acting, improv, musical theatre and life skills, and serves as chair of the theatre department at The Young Americans College of the Performing Arts in Southern California, where she is loved dearly by many of her students. She is a certified NLP practitioner.

In 2016 Kim Wimmer became founder, CEO at The Invincible Artist.

== Pageants ==
While a student at Baker High School, in Mobile County, Wimmer was chosen as Alabama's Junior Miss for 1989. The win earned her $11,000 in scholarship money plus a $1,000 cash prize as the scholastic achievement winner. Wimmer won the Miss Leeds Area 1991 title, competing unsuccessfully in the 1991 Miss Alabama pageant.

Wimmer was crowned Miss Point Mallard in July 1991 which made her eligible to compete at the June 1992 Miss Alabama pageant. Entering the state pageant as one of 45 finalists, Wimmer's preliminary competition talent for Miss Alabama was singing "Hold On" from the musical The Secret Garden. Her platform involved educating homeless youth in the Birmingham, Alabama, area. Wimmer won the competition on Saturday, June 20, 1992, when she received her crown from outgoing Miss Alabama titleholder Wendy Neuendorf. She became the first Mobile, Alabama, resident to win the state title since Yolande Betbeze won it in 1950.

Wimmer was Alabama's representative at the Miss America 1993 pageant in Atlantic City, New Jersey, in September 1992. Her competition talent was singing. She was not one of the finalists for the national title but she did win the Quality of Life Award and a $10,000 scholarship for her community service efforts.

As Miss Alabama, her activities included public appearances across the state of Alabama, including pageant hosting, autograph signings, and speaking engagements with school, church, and civic groups. She was included in two trading card sets produced by Cypher Entertainment in 1992. The first set celebrated the winners of each of the 50 state pageants in the Miss America system. The second detailed the Miss America 1993 pageant and Wimmer appeared on multiple cards.

Her reign as Miss Alabama continued until Kalyn Chapman was crowned on June 19, 1993.

== Personal life and education ==
Wimmer is a native of Mobile, Alabama, and graduated from Baker High School in 1989. She earned a bachelor's degree in musical theater with a minor in psychology, graduating cum laude from Birmingham–Southern College in August 1993. As of 2015, she is a graduate student at The University of Pennsylvania in the Master of Applied Positive Psychology program.

She married actor Mark Totty on June 8, 2002. They reside in Los Angeles, California.

Awards and achievements
Preceded by Wendy Neuendorf	Miss Alabama; 1992	Succeeded by Kalyn Chapman
