= Miss America 1997 =

70th edition of the Miss America competition

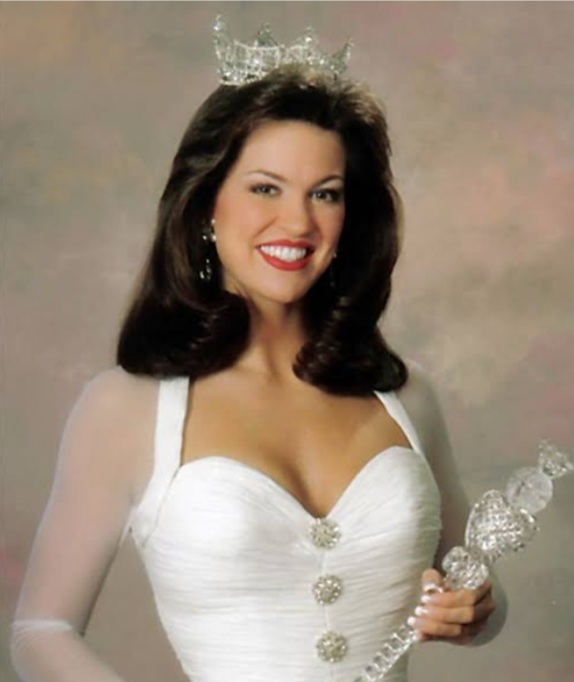
- Tara Dawn Holland, Miss America 1997
- Date: September 14, 1996
- Presenters: Regis Philbin
- Venue: Boardwalk Hall, Atlantic City, New Jersey
- Broadcaster: NBC
- Winner: Tara Dawn Holland; Kansas

Miss America 1997, the 70th Miss America pageant, was held at the Boardwalk Hall in Atlantic City, New Jersey on Saturday, September 14, 1996, and televised by the NBC Network. Until the 2019 Pageant, this was the last time that NBC aired the Miss America pageant.

== Results ==
=== Placements ===
Placement	Contestant
Miss America 1997	Kansas - Tara Dawn Holland
1st Runner-Up	Louisiana - Erika Rachael Schwarz
2nd Runner-Up	Oregon – Patricia Regan Leines
3rd Runner-Up	Alabama – Alison McCreary
4th Runner-Up	Missouri – Kimberly Anne Massaro
Top 10	Hawaii – Melissa Short; Indiana – Shani Lynn Nielsen; Kentucky – Veronica Marie Duka; Mississippi – Kari Litton; Texas – Michelle Martinez

=== Awards ===
==== Quality of Life awards ====
Results	Contestant	Platform
Winner	Alabama - Alison McCreary	Hospice: A Special Kind of Caring
1st runner-up	Kansas - Tara Dawn Holland	-
2nd runner-up	Louisiana - Erika Rachael Schwarz	-

==== Other awards ====
Awards	Contestant
Albert Marks Jr. Memorial Fund Interview	Florida - Jamie Lynn Bolding
Bernie Wayne Performing Arts Scholarship	Indiana - Shani Lynn Nielsen
Non-finalist Interview Award	Florida - Jamie Lynn Bolding
Non-finalist Talent Award	Colorado - Michelle Stanley; Florida - Jamie Lynn Bolding; Massachusetts - Lori Flick; North Carolina - Jennifer Roberts; Ohio - Robyn Hancock; Oklahoma - Amy Linn Duncan; Virginia - Michelle Kang; West Virginia - Kari Anne Safford
Waterford Crystal Scholarship	Wyoming - Rebecca Darrington

== Delegates ==
The Miss America 1997 delegates are:

State	Name	Hometown	Age	Talent	Placement	Awards	Notes
Alabama	Alison McCreary	Florence	22	Vocal, "How Great Thou Art"	3rd runner-up	Quality of Life Winner	
Alaska	Christine Buschur	Eagle River	21	Vocal, "Another Op'nin, Another Show" & "I Got Rhythm"			
Arizona	Erin Gingrich	Yuma	21	Classical Piano, "Rhapsody in Blue"			
Arkansas	Melonie McGarrah	Rogers	22	Vocal, "I Will Always Love You"			
California	Lyndsay Kahler	Orange	22	Vocal, "Where Is It Written?" from Yentl			
Colorado	Michelle Stanley	Littleton	20	Dramatic Monologue from Quilters		Non-finalist Talent Award	Miss Colorado USA 1998
Connecticut	Stacy Perrone	Wolcott	22	Vocal, "This Time Around"			
Delaware	Aimée Michelle Voshell	Felton	18	Ballet en Pointe, "Return to Innocence"			
Florida	Jamie Lynn Bolding	Lakeland	22	Lyrical Ballet, "Can You Read My Mind"		Non-finalist Talent Award; Non-finalist Interview Award; Albert Marks Jr. Memorial Fund Interview	
(Georgia (U.S. state)) Georgia	Shea Olliff	Augusta	24	Popular Vocal, "Can You Read My Mind"			
Hawaii	Melissa Short	Kaaawa	23	Operatic Vocal, "Ah! Je Veux Vivre" from Romeo et Juliette	Top 10	Preliminary Swimsuit Award; Preliminary Talent Award	
Idaho	Misty Marriah Esplin	Preston	19	Classical Clarinet, "Concertino" by Carl Maria von Weber			
Illinois	Tania Joy Gibson	Lake Barrington	19	Vocal, "As If We Never Said Goodbye" from Sunset Boulevard			
Indiana	Shani Lynn Nielsen	New Albany	24	Vocal, "In His Eyes" from Jekyll & Hyde	Top 10	Preliminary Talent Award; Bernie Wayne Performing Arts Scholarship	
Iowa	Natasha Ann Courter	Davenport	23	Tap Dance, "It Don't Mean a Thing (If It Ain't Got That Swing)"			
Kansas	Tara Dawn Holland	Overland Park	23	Operatic Vocal, "Où Va la Jeune Hindoue" from Lakmé	Miss America 1997	Quality of Life 1st runner-up Preliminary Swimsuit Award	
Kentucky	Veronica Marie Duka	Campbellsville	19	Vocal, "Somewhere" from West Side Story	Top 10		
Louisiana	Erika Rachael Schwarz	Folsom	24	Original Piano Composition, "New Orleans Rhapsody"	1st runner-up	Quality of Life 2nd runner-up	Entertainment lawyer Judge for Miss America 2006 pageant Was "Pageant Coach" on the Miss America 2007 "Pageant School" TV movie
Maine	Sarah Nadeau	Portland	20	Classical Vocal, "Addio" from La bohème			
Maryland	Susan Alexander	Silver Spring	24	Popular Vocal, "Sing Me"			
Massachusetts	Lori Flick	Boston	24	Interpretive Gymnastics Dance, Prologue from Beauty and the Beast		Non-finalist Talent Award	
Michigan	Jennifer Lynn Drayton	Saginaw	22	Classical Piano, with original accompaniment, "Sonata Appassionata"			
Minnesota	Sherry Johnson	Owatonna	22	Vocal, "Zing! Went the Strings of My Heart"			
Mississippi	Kari Litton	Pontotoc	23	Vocal, "Cry"	Top 10		
Missouri	Kimberly Anne Massaro	St. Louis	24	Tap Dance, "Favorite Son" from The Will Rogers Follies	4th runner-up		
Montana	Aubrey Jo Hiller	Missoula	22	Vocal, "All the Things You Are"			Miss Montana Teen USA 1992
Nebraska	Rachel White	Columbus	20	Vocal, "Via Dolorosa"			
Nevada	Annette Albertson	Reno	24	Vocal, "Luck Be a Lady"			
New Hampshire	Michelle Tolson	Manchester	22	Jazz Dance, "Hit Me with a Hot Note" from Sophisticated Ladies			
New Jersey	Melanie Joyce Bell	Vernon	20	Jazz Dance, "They Can't Take That Away From Me"			
New Mexico	Trisha Williams	Hobbs	19	Contemporary Gospel Vocal, "He's Always There"			
(New York (state)) New York	Tammy Harris	Williamstown	24	Dance, "O Fortuna"			
North Carolina	Jennifer Michelle Roberts	Greensboro	21	Tap Dance, "Devil with a Blue Dress On"		Non-finalist Talent Award	
North Dakota	Stephanie Lee Hamilton	Williston	18	Lyrical Dance, "On My Knees"			
Ohio	Robyn Hancock	Grand Rapids	21	Classical Ballet, "Dance of the Sugar Plum Fairy" from The Nutcracker		Non-finalist Talent Award	
Oklahoma	Amy Linn Duncan	Oklahoma City	23	Dramatic Vocal, "A Piece of Sky" from Yentl		Non-finalist Talent Award	
Oregon	Patricia Regan Leines	Medford	24	Operatic Aria, "Chacun le Sait" from La fille du régiment	2nd runner-up	Preliminary Swimsuit Award; Preliminary Talent Award	
Pennsylvania	GiGi Gordon	Butler	23	Lyrical Dance, "When a Man Loves a Woman"			
Rhode Island	Elana Eve Chomiszak	Providence	21	Modern Dance, "Nice Work If You Can Get It"			
South Carolina	Angela Michelle Hughes	Anderson	21	Tap Dance, "Sing, Sing, Sing"			
South Dakota	Stephanie Camp	Rapid City	20	Vocal, "I Am Changing" from Dreamgirls			
Tennessee	Jeni Stephens	Memphis	23	Popular Vocal, "Operator"			
Texas	Michelle Martinez	Dallas	23	Classical Piano, "Chopin's Ballade in G Minor"	Top 10		
Utah	Nanette Pearson	Pleasant Grove	23	Classical Ballet, La Boutique fantasque			
Vermont	Nicole Juvan	Essex Junction	22	Vocal, "Someday My Prince Will Come" from Snow White and the Seven Dwarfs			
Virginia	Michelle Kang	Fredericksburg	22	Classical Piano, "Hungarian Rhapsody No. 2"		Non-finalist Talent Award	
(Washington (state)) Washington	Janet Reasons	Port Orchard	22	Semi-Classical Vocal, "Half a Moment" from Jeeves			
West Virginia	Kari Anne Safford	Point Pleasant	23	Vocal, "God Help the Outcasts" from The Hunchback of Notre Dame		Non-finalist Talent Award	
Wisconsin	Jennifer Streblow	Oshkosh	18	Vocal, "Someone Like You" from Jekyll & Hyde			
Wyoming	Rebecca Darrington	Gillette	19	Comedy Vocal, "100 Easy Ways to Lose a Man" from Wonderful Town		Waterford Crystal Scholarship	
