= Deidre Downs =

American physician and former beauty pageant titleholder

Deidre Downs Gunn
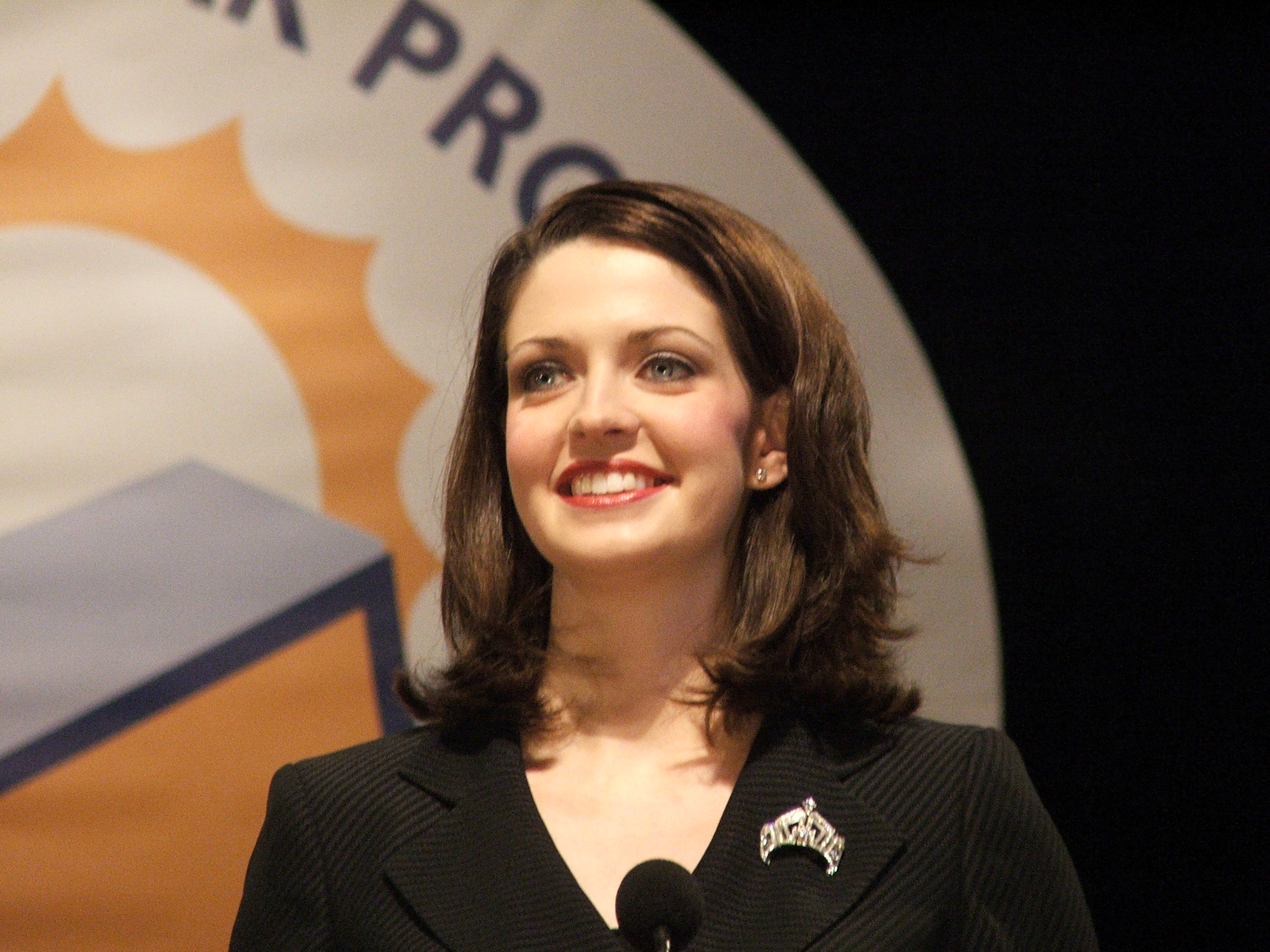
- Downs at the Jimmy Carter Work Project June, 2005
- Born: July 7, 1980 (age 46); Alabama, U.S.
- Education: University of Virginia; Samford University (BA); University of Alabama School of Medicine (MD)
- Occupations: Physician in Obstetrics and Gynecology (Reproductive Endocrinology and Infertility)
- Employer: Reach Fertility, North Carolina
- Title: Miss Leeds Area 2004; Miss Alabama 2004; Miss America 2005
- Term: September 18, 2004 - January 21, 2006
- Predecessor: Ericka Dunlap
- Successor: Jennifer Berry
- Spouses: Andrew Gunn (m. 2008; div.); Abbott Jones (m. 2018)
- Children: 1

Deidre Downs Gunn (born July 7, 1980) is an American physician and former beauty pageant titleholder. Downs was Miss Alabama 2004 and later was crowned Miss America 2005.

== Education ==
After graduating from Pelham High School in 1998, Downs attended the University of Virginia on a volleyball scholarship. While at the University of Virginia, she was an Echols Scholar and a member of the Jefferson Literary and Debating Society. After her freshman year of college at the University of Virginia, Downs chose to focus on her studies and aspiration to go to medical school and ultimately transferred to Samford University. Her transfer resulted in her losing her scholarship, so she began competing in local pageants to earn scholarship money. She graduated magna cum laude in 2002 from Samford University with a degree in history and a double-minor in biology and chemistry. She was also a finalist for the Rhodes Scholarship in 2002.

After completing her stint as Miss America, she began medical school at the University of Alabama School of Medicine (UAB) in Birmingham. She received her Doctor of Medicine in 2010 and then completed her residency in obstetrics and gynecology at the UAB Medical Center in 2014. She continued her education at the UAB Medical Center and completed her fellowship in reproductive endocrinology and infertility in 2017.

== Pageantry ==
=== Early pageants ===
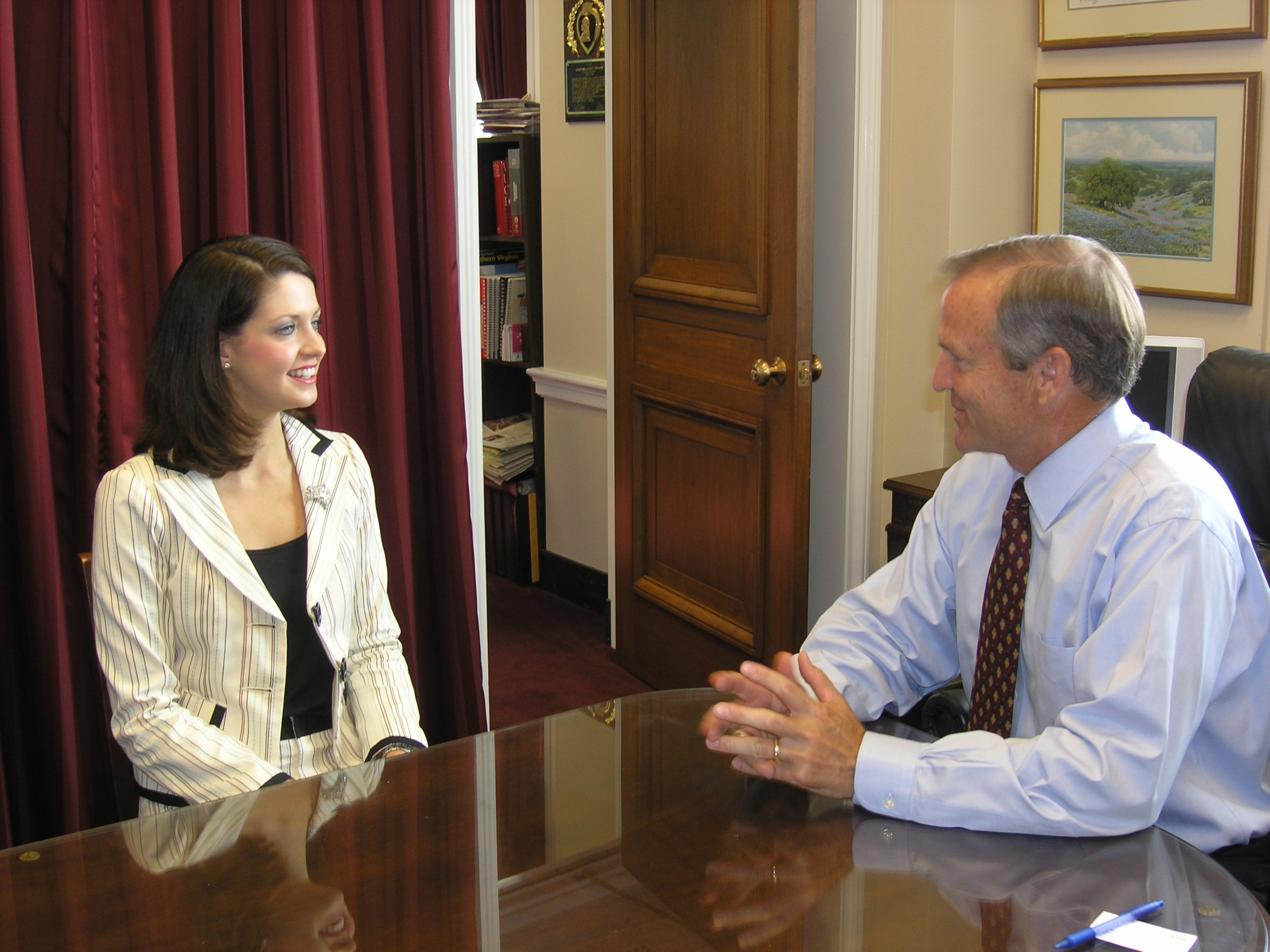
Miss America 2005 Deidre Downs (left) and congressman Chet Edwards (right) in his Washington office to discuss childhood cancer

Downs competed in her high school's pageants and won her senior year.

After her first year of college at the University of Virginia, Downs chose to focus on her studies and aspiration to go to medical school and ultimately transferred to Samford University. This transfer resulted in her losing a volleyball scholarship, so she began competing in local pageants to earn scholarship money.

She first entered the Miss Alabama pageant scene in 2000 and was named third runner-up at the 2001 and 2002 pageants and first runner-up at Miss Alabama 2003 pageant.

=== Miss Alabama 2004 ===
She was named Miss Leeds Area 2004, making her eligible to compete at the Miss Alabama 2004 pageant.

Downs won the competition in June 2004, when she received her crown from outgoing Miss Alabama titleholder, Catherine Crosby. This was her 5th time competing in the Miss Alabama pageant.

=== Miss America 2005 ===
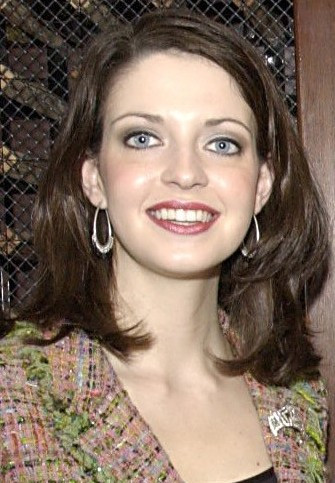
Deidre Downs in July 2005

Downs was Alabama's representative at the Miss America 2005 competition held in Atlantic City, New Jersey in September 2004. Her platform was "Curing Childhood Cancer."

In the preliminary competition, Downs was announced as the sole winner of the Quality of Life Award. For the talent portion of the competition, she sang Linda Eder's "I'm Afraid This Must be Love."

After competing in casual wear, swimsuit, evening gown, and participating in a "pop quiz", only two state titleholders remained, Downs and Miss Louisiana 2004, Jennifer Dupont. She then beat out Dupont after a head-to-head talent competition for the 2005 title and was crowned by Miss America 2004, Ericka Dunlap, on September 18, 2004. Along with the title of Miss America, Downs also won a $50,000 scholarship. Downs was the third Miss Alabama titleholder to win the Miss America title.

Downs later stated that she received nearly $110,000 in scholarship money during the five years she competed in the Miss Alabama and Miss America organizations. Downs is the only titleholder to reign for part of three calendar years. The pageant, traditionally held in September, was delayed four months to allow the Miss America Organization to secure a TV deal. Her successor, Jennifer Berry of Oklahoma, was crowned Miss America 2006 on January 21, 2006.

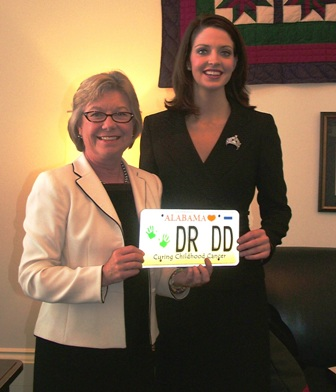
Congresswoman Deborah Pryce (left) and Deidre Downs (right), Miss America 2005

Downs Gunn later served as a judge for the final night of competition for the Miss America 2014 pageant in which Nina Davuluri was named Miss America.

== Personal life ==
After Downs married her college sweetheart, Andrew Gunn, in March 2008, she changed her name to Deidre Downs Gunn. They had a son in 2010. The couple later divorced.

Downs remarried in 2018 in a private ceremony at the Birmingham Museum of Art in Birmingham, Alabama. Her wife, Abbott Jones, is an attorney and writer. Downs is the first former Miss America national titleholder to enter a same-sex marriage.

Awards and achievements
Preceded by Ericka Dunlap	Miss America; 2005	Succeeded by Jennifer Berry
Preceded by Catherine Crosby	Miss Alabama; 2004	Succeeded by Shannon Camper
