= Caitlin Brunell =

Miss America's Outstanding Teen 2008

- Born: Caitlin Brunell; May 17, 1992 (age 34); Seattle, Washington, U.S.
- Beauty pageant titleholder
- Title: Miss Virginia's Outstanding Teen 2007; Miss America's Outstanding Teen 2008; Miss Jacksonville Teen USA 2009; Miss University of Alabama 2012; Miss Rocket City 2013; Miss Leeds Area 2014; Miss Alabama 2014
- Hair color: Brown
- Eye color: Brown
- Major competitions: Miss America's Outstanding Teen 2008 (winner); Miss America 2015 (Top 10)

Caitlin Brunell (born May 17, 1992) is an American beauty pageant titleholder from Great Falls, Virginia who won the Miss America's Outstanding Teen 2008 title in August 2007. In 2014, she was crowned Miss Alabama and represented the state at the Miss America 2015 competition where she was a Top Ten semi-finalist and the Quality of Life Award winner.

== Early life ==
Brunell is the daughter of Stacey and Mark Brunell, a former NFL quarterback. She was home schooled through middle school and spent her freshman year at Georgetown Visitation Preparatory School. She attended high school at Providence School. She is a 2014 graduate of the University of Alabama.

== Pageants ==
In 2007, Brunell won the Miss Greater Richmond's Outstanding Teen title and then the Miss Virginia's Outstanding Teen title. She represented Virginia in the third Miss America's Outstanding Teen pageant held on August 11, 2007, and won the title. She also won a preliminary evening gown award earlier in the week. In 2008, Caitlin also won the Miss Jacksonville's Teen USA 2008 in Florida.

She was also crowned Queen Shenandoah LXXXIV at the 84th Shenandoah Apple Blossom Festival on April 30, 2011, in Winchester, Virginia. In 2012, she was chosen as Miss University of Alabama. In 2013, she was crowned Miss Rocket City and was a top-11 semi-finalist for Miss Alabama 2013.

In June 2014, competing as Miss Leeds Area, Brunell was crowned Miss Alabama. In September 2014, she represented the state at the Miss America 2015 pageant. She made the initial cut and competed in the swimwear, evening wear, and talent competitions to place in the top ten contestants as a semi-finalist but she was not one of the five finalists. Brunell won a Quality of Life Award for her community work with Caitlin's Closet.

== Personal life ==
Brunell runs her own non-profit organization called "Caitlin's Closet", which collects donated prom gowns and distributes them to those in need.

Preceded by Chandler Champion	Miss Alabama; 2014	Succeeded by Meg McGuffin
Preceded by Maria DeSantis	Miss America's Outstanding Teen; 2008	Succeeded by Taylor Fitch
Preceded by Brittany Young	Miss Virginia's Outstanding Teen; 2007	Succeeded by Lexie Overholt
