= Julie Smith (Miss Alabama) =

American beauty pageant titleholder

- Born: 1975 or 1976 (age 50–51)
- Beauty pageant titleholder
- Title: Miss Alabama 1999
- Major competition: Miss America 2000

Julie Smith West is an American beauty pageant titleholder from Birmingham, Alabama, who was named Miss Alabama 1999.

== Career ==
Smith won the title of Miss Lake Harding 1997. Her two sisters also won qualifying pageants that year and were among the 45 women competing to become Miss Alabama 1997. Smith was crowned Miss Magic City 1998. She went on to tie for first place in the preliminary swimsuit competition then placed second runner-up at the 1998 Miss Alabama pageant.

In 1999, Smith won the Miss Chattahoochee Valley title. Entering the 1999 Miss Alabama pageant as one of 47 finalists, Smith's preliminary competition talent for Miss Alabama was playing the marimba. Smith won the competition on Saturday, June 19, 1999, when she received her crown from outgoing Miss Alabama titleholder Ashley Halfman. Along with the title, she received a $10,000 scholarship and other prizes.

On February 15, 2000, the Alabama Legislature passed a joint house resolution congratulating Smith on her victory, praising her breast cancer awareness work, and lauding her academic achievement. As Miss Alabama, her activities included public appearances across the state of Alabama, including speaking engagements and fashion shows.

Smith was Alabama's representative at the Miss America 2000 pageant in Atlantic City, New Jersey. As part of the festivities surrounding the pageant, Smith participated in the traditional "Show Us Your Shoes Parade". Her competition talent was playing a medley of "Flight of the Bumblebee" and "Csárdás" on the marimba. Smith was a top ten semi-finalist for the national title. Her reign as Miss Alabama continued until Jana Sanderson was crowned on June 17, 2000.

== Personal life ==
Smith is a graduate of Huffman High School in Birmingham, Alabama. She graduated cum laude from Samford University in 1998 with a bachelor's degree in broadcast journalism.

Her father, Robert Smith, is a strategic planner. Her mother, Sharon Ingram Smith, is an administrator. She has younger sisters, Jennifer and Jill, who are identical twins. Smith was raised Southern Baptist. She and her husband, Rob West, live in Roswell, Georgia.

Awards and achievements
Preceded by Ashley Halfman	Miss Alabama; 1999	Succeeded by Jana Sanderson
