= Miss America 2000 =

73rd Miss America pageant

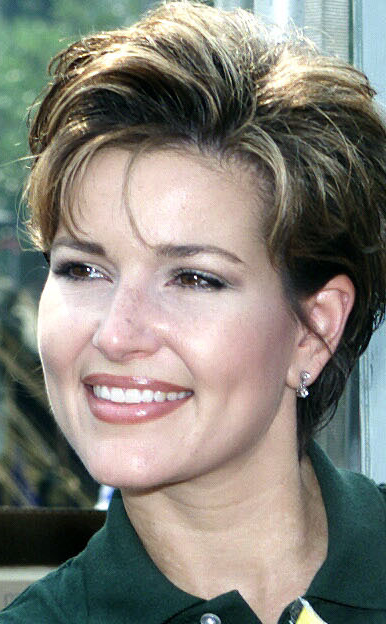
- Miss America 2000, Heather French
- Date: September 18, 1999
- Presenters: Donny Osmond; Marie Osmond
- Venue: Boardwalk Hall, Atlantic City, New Jersey
- Broadcaster: ABC
- Winner: Heather French; Kentucky

Miss America 2000, the 73rd Miss America pageant, was held at the Boardwalk Hall in Atlantic City, New Jersey on Saturday, September 18, 1999 on ABC Network.

Heather French became the first Miss Kentucky to win the crown. She later married the state's lieutenant governor, Steve Henry.

== Results ==
=== Placements ===
Final results	Contestant
Miss America 2000	Kentucky – Heather French
1st runner-up	Illinois – Jade Smalls
2nd runner-up	Pennsylvania – Susan Spafford
3rd runner-up	Maryland – Keri Schrader
4th runner-up	Texas – Yanci Yarbrough
Top 10	Alabama – Julie Smith; Arkansas – Brandy Rhodes; Connecticut – Sylvia Gomes; New Jersey – Victoria Andrews Paige; Wisconsin – Mary-Louise Kurey

=== Awards ===
==== Preliminary awards ====
Awards	Contestant
Lifestyle and Fitness	Kentucky – Heather French; Nevada – Gina Giacinto; Rhode Island – Karen Lindsay
Talent	Louisiana – Julie Lawrence; Virginia – Crystal Lewis; Wisconsin – Mary-Louise Kurey

==== Quality of Life awards ====
Results	Contestant	Platform	
Winner	New Hampshire – Brandee Helbick	Educational Disabilities Awareness	
1st runner-up	Kentucky – Heather French	Honoring Our Forgotten Heroes: Our Nations Homeless Veterans	–
2nd runner-up	Alabama – Julie Smith	Breast Cancer Awareness "Early Detection...Giving the Freedom to Fight"	

==== Other awards ====
Awards	Contestant
Albert A. Marks Jr. Interview Award	Indiana – Kelly Lloyd
Miss America Scholar Award	Louisiana – Julie Lawrence
Bernie Wayne Performing Arts Award	Wisconsin – Mary-Louise Kurey
Non-finalist Talent Award	California – MaryAnne Sapio; (Washington, D.C.) District of Columbia – Toyia Taylor; (Georgia (U.S. state)) Georgia – Osjha Anderson; Iowa – Jennifer Caudle; Louisiana – Julie Lawrence; Massachusetts – April Thibeault; Mississippi – Heather Soriano; (New York (state)) New York – Brandi Burkhardt; Utah – Vanessa Ballam; Virginia – Crystal Lewis
Tiffany Phillips Memorial Scholar Athlete Award	Oregon – Angela Reed
Waterford Scholarship for Business Marketing & Management	Tennessee – Allison Alderson

== Delegates ==
- Alabama – Julie Smith
- Alaska – Shannon Kelly
- Arizona – Lori Whiting
- Arkansas – Brandy Rhodes
- California – MaryAnne Sapio
- Colorado – Erin MacGregor
- Connecticut – Sylvia Gomes
- Delaware – Kama Katherine Boland
- (Washington, D.C.) District of Columbia – Toyia Taylor
- Florida – Kelli Meierhenry
- (Georgia (U.S. state)) Georgia – Osjha Anderson
- Hawaii – Candes Meijide Gentry
- Idaho – Mellisa Kae Paul
- Illinois – Jade Smalls
- Indiana – Kelly Lloyd
- Iowa – Jennifer Caudle
- Kansas – Maureen Darby
- Kentucky – Heather French
- Louisiana – Julie Lawrence
- Maine – Rebecca Pelkey
- Maryland – Keri Schrader
- Massachusetts – April Marie Thiebeault
- Michigan – Audrie Chernauckas
- Minnesota – Natalie Lund
- Mississippi – Heather Soriano
- Missouri – Patryce CoRae King
- Montana – Elissa Ann Schwarz
- Nebraska – Becky Smith
- Nevada – Gina Giacinto
- New Hampshire – Brandee Helbick
- New Jersey – Victoria Andrews Paige
- New Mexico – Katie Linda Amalia Kelley
- (New York (state)) New York – Brandi Burkhardt
- North Carolina – Kelly Trogdon
- North Dakota – Kay Picconatto
- Ohio – Tiffany Baumann
- Oklahoma – Daneka Danyell Allen
- Oregon – Angela Reed
- Pennsylvania – Susan Spafford
- Rhode Island – Karen Lindsay
- South Carolina – Danielle Davis
- South Dakota – Trisha Haroldson
- Tennessee – Allison Alderson
- Texas – Yanci Yarbrough
- Utah – Vanessa Ballam
- Vermont – Katy Johnson
- Virginia – Crystal Lewis
- (Washington (state)) Washington – Tina Willis
- West Virginia – Lucy Joanna Ours
- Wisconsin – Mary-Louise Kurey
- Wyoming – Elaine Dabney

== Judges ==
- Michael Badalucco
- Gretchen Carlson
- Tia Carrere
- Mimi Kennedy
- Briana Scurry
- Judge Judy Sheindlin
- Larry Jenkins
