= Ann Fowler =

American beauty pageant titleholder

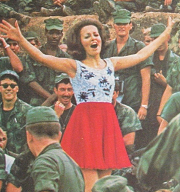
- Fowler entertaining troops in South Vietnam
- Born: Ann Harriet Fowler; March 16, 1948 (age 78)
- Education: Birmingham–Southern College
- Height: 5 ft 6 in (1.68 m)
- Beauty pageant titleholder
- Title: Alabama's Junior Miss 1966; Miss Alabama 1969
- Hair color: Brunette
- Eye color: Brown
- Major competition: Miss America 1970

Ann Fowler (born March 16, 1948) is an American beauty pageant titleholder from Birmingham, Alabama, who was named Miss Alabama 1969. She would later marry and divorce American television executive Roone Arledge.

== Career ==
Fowler was chosen as Alabama's Junior Miss for 1966.

In 1967, she was named first runner-up to Miss Alabama 1967, Becky Alford.

Entering the 1969 Miss Alabama pageant as one of 50 contestants and 24 finalists, Fowler's preliminary competition talent for Miss Alabama was singing "Promises, Promises" and "I'll Never Fall in Love Again". The final round talent portion of the program was dropped due to the length of Ahead to the Stars, a musical drama honoring Alabama's sesquicentennial and presented as part of the evening's entertainment.

Fowler won the competition on Saturday, July 5, 1969, when she received her crown from outgoing Miss Alabama titleholder Dellynne Catching. After winning, Fowler resigned from her job in the office of Congressman John Hall Buchanan, Jr. (Republican, Alabama's 6th) to focus on her role as Miss Alabama and prepare for the Miss America pageant.

As Miss Alabama, her activities included public appearances across the state of Alabama, riding the Alabama float in the inaugural parade for President Richard Nixon, and an August 1970 USO tour visiting the troops in South Vietnam. The United States Marine Corps commemorated her Vietnam trip by putting her on the December 1970 cover of Leatherneck, "Magazine of the Marines".

Fowler was Alabama's representative at the Miss America 1970 pageant in Atlantic City, New Jersey. Her competition talent was signing "Matchmaker, Matchmaker" from the musical Fiddler on the Roof. Fowler was not one of the finalists for the title. Her reign as Miss Alabama continued until Suzanne Dennie was crowned on June 27, 1970.

== Personal life ==
Fowler is a 1966 graduate of Banks High School in Birmingham, Alabama, and earned a bachelor's degree in music from Birmingham–Southern College. Her mother is Mrs. N.W. Fowler of Birmingham, an interior designer.

In 1975, she married ABC television executive Roone Arledge. She was his second wife. The couple divorced in 1985.

Awards and achievements
Preceded by Dellynne Catching	Miss Alabama; 1969	Succeeded by Suzanne Dennie
