= Jade Simmons =

Acclaimed author, speaker, musician and 2020 Presidential Candidate

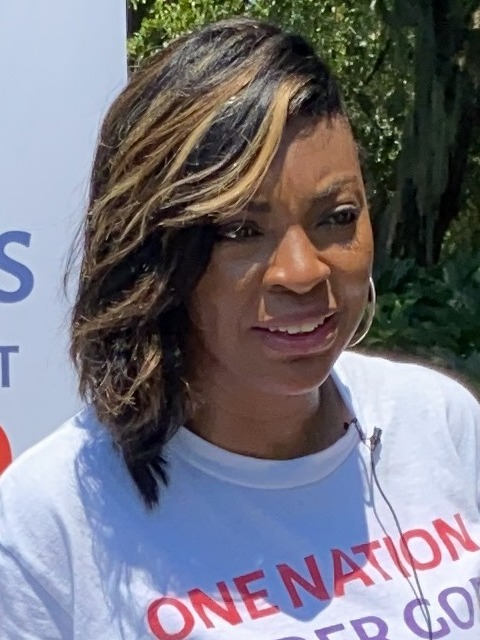
- Simmons in 2020
- Born: Charleston, South Carolina, U.S.
- Occupations: CEO & Founder of Jade Media Global
- Website: jadesimmons.com

Jade Simmons is an American classical concert pianist and beauty pageant holder, who was an independent presidential candidate in 2020.

== Career ==
Simmons attended college at Northwestern University, and was crowned Miss Chicago and Miss Illinois in 1999. She was named first runner-up at the Miss America 2000 pageant.

In 2004, Simmons founded the Impulse Artists Series which was the 2009 winner of the Houston Press Best Non-Profit Arts Series. Simmons' first album was titled Revolutionary Rhythm, and was released in 2009. She released the single "Boss's Nova" in September 2012, and the Playing With Fire EP followed by a second full release on E1 titled #PaganiniProject in February 2013.

Time noted that in her "Decomposed" podcast, Simmons "blends history, scandal and musical analysis" and Esquire called it "a great introduction to appreciating classical music".

== Politics ==
Simmons ran for president of the United States in 2020 as an independent. She ran on a centrist platform, attempting to appeal to what she defined as a "muted middle" of voters. Simmons had access to 15 electors. Her running mate was Claudeliah J. Roze.
