= American Cochlear Implant Alliance =

- Formation: 2011; 15 years ago
- Type: 501(c)(3) Non-profit Advocacy group
- Chair: Daniel M. Zeitler, MD
- Founding Director: Donna L. Sorkin (2012-2026)
- Executive Director: Carrie Spangler, AuD (2026-present)
- Website: www.acialliance.org

The American Cochlear Implant Alliance (ACI Alliance) is a 501(c)(3) nonprofit organization that works to increase access to cochlear implantation through research, policy advocacy, and public awareness initiatives. The organization represents professionals, researchers, recipients, and other stakeholders in the field of cochlear implantation.

ACI Alliance was established in October 2011 to "eliminate barriers to cochlear implantation...by improving access to, and increasing awareness about cochlear implants." The Alliance was founded by a group of surgeons, audiologists, and speech-language pathologists active in cochlear implantation research and practice, including Dr. John K. Niparko and Dr. Teresa Zwolan.

== Federal advocacy ==
The Alliance has participated in federal health policy processes, including significant updates related to Medicare coverage for cochlear implantation. The organization was a primary formal requestor to the Centers for Medicare & Medicaid Services (CMS) seeking reconsideration of the National Coverage Determination governing cochlear implants. Following the reconsideration process, CMS issued a revised coverage determination expanding eligibility criteria for cochlear implantation. The ACI Alliance has also advocated specifically for individuals with asymmetric hearing loss and single-sided deafness.

The Alliance participates in national coalitions addressing hearing health and disability policy, including Friends of the Congressional Hearing Health Caucus and Independence Through Enhancement of Medicare and Medicaid (ITEM).

== State-level advocacy ==
The Alliance engages in advocacy at the state level through a nationwide network of volunteers who participate in legislative and regulatory processes related to hearing health and cochlear implantation through testimony, written submissions, and committee participation.

== Professional activities and research ==
Proceedings from the Alliance's national symposia and meetings have addressed clinical outcomes, guided candidacy criteria, and established standards of care for cochlear implantation.

Federal research databases and CMS evidentiary materials list the Alliance as a sponsor or contributor to studies reviewed as part of Medicare coverage determinations for cochlear implantation.
