= Miss America 2005 =

78th edition of the Miss America competition

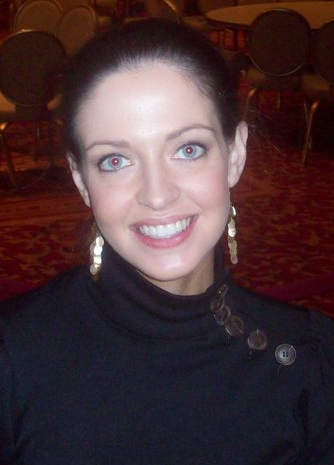
- Deidre Downs Gunn pictured in 2008
- Date: September 18, 2004
- Presenters: Chris Harrison
- Venue: Boardwalk Hall, Atlantic City, New Jersey
- Broadcaster: ABC
- Entrants: 52
- Placements: 10
- Debuts: Virgin Islands
- Winner: Deidre Downs; Alabama

Miss America 2005, the 78th Miss America pageant, was held in Atlantic City on Saturday, September 18, 2004, following a week of events including the preliminary competition.

The pageant was broadcast live on ABC from Boardwalk Hall in Atlantic City. Although this was not known at the time, this pageant would be the last held in Atlantic City until 2013, as the pageant moved to Las Vegas, Nevada beginning in 2006. It was also the last one to be televised by an over-the-air network until 2011.

At the conclusion of the final night of competition, Ericka Dunlap crowned Deidre Downs of Alabama as her successor.

== Competition ==
All delegates compete in an interview competition with the judges, based on their platform issue, and also in the swimsuit, evening gown and talent competitions.

Prior to the nationally televised competition, the delegates participate in three nights of preliminary competition (accounting for 30% of final night's score), where preliminary award winners are chosen in each category.

During the final telecast, following the announcement of the semi-finalists, the top ten competed in casual wear and swimsuit (each worth 15% and 10% of final night's score, respectively). The top five went on to compete in evening gown (15% of score) and took part in a quiz show (20% of score) that replaced the onstage question that year. The final two contestants (Miss Alabama 2004, Deidre Downs and Miss Louisiana 2004, Jennifer Dupont) standing advanced to the first-ever head-to-head talent competition (20% of score), the final event that determined who would become Miss America 2005.

== Results ==
=== Placements ===
Placement	Contestant
Miss America 2005	Alabama – Deidre Downs
1st Runner-Up	Louisiana – Jennifer Dupont
2nd Runner-Up	North Carolina – Kirstin Elrod
3rd Runner-Up	Arkansas – Lacy Fleming
4th Runner-Up	California – Veena Goel
Top 10	Georgia – Danica Tisdale; Kansas – Megan Bushell; New York – Christina Ellington; Oklahoma – Elizabeth Kinney; Texas – Jamie Story

=== Awards ===
==== Preliminary awards ====
Awards	Contestant
Lifestyle and Fitness	Florida - Jenna Edwards; Louisiana - Jennifer Dupont; Utah - Amy Davis
Talent	California - Veena Goel; (Georgia (U.S. state)) Georgia - Danica Tisdale; Massachusetts - Erika Ebbel

==== Final night awards ====
Awards	Contestant
Casual wear	Louisiana - Jennifer Dupont
Swimsuit	Louisiana - Jennifer Dupont
Evening wear	Alabama - Deidre Downs

==== Quality of Life award ====
Results	Contestant	Platform
Winner	Alabama - Deidre Downs	Curing Childhood Cancer
1st runner-up	Idaho - Elizabeth Barchas	Promoting Understanding of Individuals with Disabilities
2nd runner-up	Nevada - Elizabeth Muto	‘H.E.L.P.’ing Children Overcome Adversities

==== Non-finalist awards ====
Awards	Contestant
Interview	Idaho - Elizabeth Barchas; Kentucky - Maria Maldonado; Nevada - Elizabeth Muto; New Hampshire - Alyssa Spellman; New Mexico - Susan Yara
Talent	Indiana - Sarah Wiley; Iowa - Carolyn Nicholas; Maine - Ami Vice; Massachusetts - Erika Ebbel; Missouri - Whitney Weeks; New Jersey - Erica Scanlon; Ohio - Amanda Beagle; Tennessee - Ashley Eicher

==== Other awards ====
Awards	Contestant
Miss Congeniality	Hawaii - Olena Rubin
Bernie Wayne Scholarship for the Performing Arts	Maine - Ami Vice
Leonard C. Horn for Legal Studies	Idaho - Elizabeth Barchas

== Delegates ==
State	Name	Hometown	Age	Talent	Placement	Awards	Notes
Alabama	Deidre Downs	Birmingham	24	Vocal	Winner	Quality of Life	
Alaska	Christina Reasner	Sterling	22	Pop Vocal			
Arizona	Katherine Kennedy	Tempe	24	Baton Twirling			
Arkansas	Lacy Fleming	Hampton	22	Vocal	3rd runner-up		
California	Veena Goel	Laguna Hills	22	Jazz Dance	4th runner-up	Preliminary Talent	
Colorado	Laura Tobey	Denver	23	Jazz Vocal			
Connecticut	Nikki Palmieri	North Haven	22	Jazz Dance			
Delaware	Linda Kurtz	Dover	21	Ballet			
District of Columbia	Therese Lizardo	Watchung	24	Tahitian / Hawaiian Dance			
Florida	Jenna Edwards	Miami	23	Pop Vocal		Preliminary Swimsuit	Miss Florida USA 2007
Georgia	Danica Tisdale	Atlanta	23	Vocal	Top 10	Preliminary Talent	
Hawaii	Olena Rubin	Kilauea	23	Vocal		Miss Congeniality	
Idaho	Elizabeth Barchas	Boise	24	Classical Piano		Quality of Life 1st runner-up, Non-finalist Interview, Leonard C. Horn for Legal Studies	Triple Crown winner: Miss Idaho Teen USA 1998, Miss Idaho USA 2001
Illinois	Michelle LaGroue	Naperville	24	Vocal			
Indiana	Sarah Wiley	Carmel	24	Vocal		Non-finalist Talent	
Iowa	Carolyn Nicholas	Clear Lake	23	Flute		Non-finalist Talent	
Kansas	Megan Bushell	Wichita	22	Classical Vocal	Top 10		
Kentucky	Maria Maldonado	Lexington	22	Vocal		Non-finalist Interview	
Louisiana	Jennifer Dupont	Plaquemine	23	Jazz Dance	1st runner-up	Preliminary Swimsuit	Triple Crown winner: Miss Louisiana Teen USA 1998, Miss Louisiana USA 2000
Maine	Ami Vice	Lisbon Falls	23	Classical Vocal		Non-finalist Talent, Bernie Wayne Scholarship for the Performing Arts	
Maryland	Tiffany Jenkins	Silver Spring	24	Vocal			
Massachusetts	Erika Ebbel	Cambridge	23	Classical Piano		Preliminary Talent, Non-finalist Talent	
Michigan	Kelli Talicska	Auburn	24	Vocal			
Minnesota	Tiffany Ogle	Waverly	24	Vocal			
Mississippi	Jalin Wood	Waynesboro	23	Piano			Miss Mississippi USA 2007
Missouri	Whitney Weeks	Chesterfield	24	Tap Dance		Non-finalist Talent	
Montana	Evangelina Duke	Billings	20	Vocal			
Nebraska	Brook Matthews	Blair	24	Vocal			
Nevada	Elizabeth Muto	Las Vegas	24	Monologue		Quality of Life 2nd runner-up, Non-finalist Interview	
New Hampshire	Alyssa Spellman	Derry	21	Vocal		Non-finalist Interview	
New Jersey	Erica Scanlon	Pitman	22	Vocal		Non-finalist Talent	
New Mexico	Susan Yara	Pecos	23	Vocal		Non-finalist Interview	
New York	Christina Ellington	New York City	22	Operatic Vocal	Top 10		
North Carolina	Kirstin Elrod	Cary	23	Classical Vocal	2nd runner-up		
North Dakota	Ashley Ford	Cavalier	21	Vocal			
Ohio	Amanda Beagle	Warren	24	Operatic Aria		Non-finalist Talent	
Oklahoma	Elizabeth Kinney	Mooreland	22	Tap Dance	Top 10		
Oregon	Brook Roberts	Roseburg	21	Vocal			The Amazing Race 17 contestant along with her fellow home shopping host Claire Champlin
Pennsylvania	Victoria Bechtold	Johnstown	21	Classical Operatic Vocal			
Rhode Island	Aimée Belisle	North Smithfield	24	Ballet			
South Carolina	Ann Wood	Spartanburg	23	Lyrical Dance			
South Dakota	Kyra Korver	Mitchell	23	Broadway Vocal			
Tennessee	Ashley Eicher	Nashville	24	Vocal		Non-finalist Talent	
Texas	Jamie Story	Bedford	23	Classical Piano	Top 10		
Utah	Amy Davis	Bountiful	22	Classical Piano		Preliminary Swimsuit	1st runner-up at Miss Utah USA 2007
Vermont	Megan Yardley	Burlington	24	Vocal			
Virginia	Mariah Rice	Mechanicsville	24	Lyrical Dance			
Virgin Islands	Kinila Callendar	Saint Thomas	24	Cultural Dance			
Washington	Allison Porter	University Place	24	Classical Violin			
West Virginia	Julia Burton	Petersburg	22	Pop Vocal			
Wisconsin	Molly Jean McGrath	Wisconsin Rapids	22	Theatrical Dance en Pointe			
Wyoming	Megan Reichert	Dayton	19	Classical Vocal			
