= Miss Nevada =

Beauty pageant competition

- Formation: 1949
- Type: Beauty pageant
- Headquarters: Sparks
- Location: Nevada
- Members: Miss America
- Official language: English
- Website: Official website

The Miss Nevada competition is the pageant that selects the representative for the state of Nevada in the Miss America competition, and the name of the title held by that winner. The first Nevadan to compete at Miss America was Carol Lampe in 1949.

The competition currently takes place in Lake Tahoe, Nevada. Other venues have included Reno, Elko, Las Vegas, Carson City and Mesquite. It has at various times been hosted by the Reno Lions Club and the Soroptimist club of Nevada.

Mariah Larronde of Henderson was crowned Miss Nevada 2026 on June 27, 2026, at Bally's Lake Tahoe in Stateline, Nevada. She competed for the title of Miss America 2027 on September 6, 2026, at the Kravis Center for the Performing Arts in West Palm Beach, Florida.

== Results summary ==
The following is a visual summary of the past results of Miss Nevada titleholders at the national Miss America pageants/competitions. The year in parentheses indicates the year of the national competition during which a placement and/or award was garnered, not the year attached to the contestant's state title.

=== Placements ===
- 2nd runners-up: Stacie James (1988)
- 3rd runners-up: Teresa Benitez (2003)
- Top 7: Heather Renner (2023)
- Top 10: Loni Gravelle (1958), Cheryle Thompson (1964), Joan Burachio (1972)
- Top 16: Tosca Masini (1951)

=== Awards ===
==== Preliminary awards ====
- Preliminary Interview: Teresa Benitez (2003)
- Preliminary Lifestyle and Fitness: Kathryn Blaikie (1966), Gina Giacinto (2000)
- Preliminary Talent: Stacie James (1988)

==== Non-finalist awards ====
- Non-finalist Interview: Elizabeth Muto (2005)
- Non-finalist Talent: Vicky Jo Todd (1971), Helen Bennett (1973), Sandra Kastel (1977), Megan Anderson (1979), Sonja Nall (1986), Jennifer Joseph-Lier (1996), Tiffanie Story (2001), Ellie Smith (2015)

==== Other awards ====
- Equity & Justice Winners: Heather Renner (2023)
- Overall Interview Award: Teresa Benitez (2003)
- Quality of Life Award Winners: Teresa Benitez (2003), Caleche Manos (2008)
- Quality of Life Award 2nd runners-up: Elizabeth Muto (2005), Christina Keegan (2010)
- Quality of Life Award/Social Impact Initiative Scholarship Finalists: Bailey Gumm (2017), Nasya Mancini (2020)
- STEM Scholarship Award Winners: Alexis Hilts (2019)
- STEM Scholarship Award Finalists: Katherine Kelley (2016), Andrea Martinez (2018)

== Winners ==
- Declared as winner
- Ended as a runner-up
- Ended as a finalist or semi-finalist

Year	Name	Hometown	Age	Local Title	Miss America Talent	Placement at Miss America	Special scholarships at Miss America	Notes
2026	Mariah Larronde	Henderson	27	Miss Henderson	Vocal			
2025	Abigail Bachman	Henderson	27	Miss Henderson	Lyrical Dance			Previously Miss Nevada Volunteer 2024
2024	Karrina Ferris	Carson City	21	Miss Silver State	Lyrical Dance - "You Will Be Found"			
2023	Taylor Blatchford	Boulder City	23	Miss Boulder City	Violin			Distinguished Young Woman of Nevada 2018
2022	Heather Renner	Reno	23	Miss Las Vegas	Vocal	Top 7	Equity & Justice Winner	Previously Miss Nevada's Outstanding Teen 2016
2021	Macie Tuell	Gardnerville	24	Miss Las Vegas	Vocal			Former personal assistant to David Copperfield
2019–20	Nasya Mancini	Sparks	22	Miss Washoe County	Comedic Monologue		Social Impact Initiative Scholarship Finalist	
2018	Alexis Hilts	Las Vegas	23	Miss UNLV	Piano, "Transcendental Étude No. 4" by Franz Liszt		STEM Scholarship Award	Previously Miss Nevada's Outstanding Teen 2008
2017	Andrea Martinez	Las Vegas	23	Miss Clark County	Vocal, "His Eye in on the Sparrow"		STEM Scholarship Award Finalist	
2016	Bailey Gumm	Minden	20	Miss Pleasant Valley	Tap Dance, "Sax" by Fleur East		Quality of Life Award Finalist	Previously Miss Nevada's Outstanding Teen 2011 Contestant at National Sweetheart 2014 pageant
2015	Katherine Kelley	Madisonville	23	Miss Summerlin	Piano, "Etude in D Minor"		STEM Scholarship Award Finalist	
2014	Ellie Smith	Henderson	17	Miss North East Nevada	Vocal, "Somebody to Love"		Non-finalist Talent Award	Sister of Miss Nevada's Outstanding Teen 2014, Amy Smith Previously Miss Nevada's Outstanding Teen 2012
2013	Diana Sweeney	Mound House	19	Miss Carson City	Lyrical Dance, "Roads"			Contestant at National Sweetheart 2012 pageant
2012	Randi Sundquist	Elko	22	Miss Southern Counties	Contemporary Jazz Dance, "I Won't Give Up"			
2011	Alana Lee	Las Vegas	21	Miss Clark County	Vocal, "At This Moment"			
2010	Cris Crotz	Mesquite	24	Miss Southern Counties	Popular Vocal, "Alone"			
2009	Christina Keegan	Gardnerville	23	Miss Northern Counties	Ballet en Pointe, "Bohemian Rhapsody"		Quality of Life Award 2nd runner-up	
2008	Julianna Erdesz	Reno	24	Miss Carson City	Vocal			Later Miss Nevada USA 2010
2007	Caleche Manos	Reno	23	Miss Carson City	Vocal, "Love Is a Battlefield"		Quality of Life Award Winner	Contestant at National Sweetheart 2006 pageant
2006	Caydi Cole	Las Vegas	22	Miss Clark County	Vocal, "Blues in the Night"			
2005	Crystal Wosik	Las Vegas	23	Miss Las Vegas	Lyrical Dance, "Don't Rain on My Parade" from Funny Girl			
2004	Elizabeth Muto	Las Vegas	24	Miss Las Vegas	Dramatic Monologue, "Who Will Cry?"		Non-finalist Interview Award Quality of Life Award 2nd runner-up	Received Presidential Volunteer Service Award from President George W. Bush
2003	Christina O'Neil	Carson City	24	Miss Gold Country	Vocal, "Your Daddy's Son" from Ragtime			Contestant at National Sweetheart 1999 pageant
2002	Teresa Benitez	Reno	24	Miss Silver State	Dramatic Monologue from The Laramie Project	3rd runner-up	Overall Interview Award Preliminary Interview Award Quality of Life Award Winner	Majority Floor Leader of the Nevada Assembly
2001	Ashley Huff	Las Vegas	21	Miss Las Vegas	Polynesian Dance, "Welcome to Polynesia"			Later Miss Nevada USA 2003
2000	Tiffanie Story	Reno	19	Miss UNR/Truckee Meadows	Vocal, "Ain't Misbehavin'"		Non-finalist Talent Award	
1999	Gina Giacinto	Las Vegas	24	Miss Las Vegas	Original Vocal Presentation, "Dreams Were Given Wings To Fly"		Preliminary Swimsuit Award	Later Miss Nevada USA 2001; 3rd runner-up at Miss USA 2001 pageant
1998	Anna Carpenter	Mesquite	18	Miss Mesquite	Monologue			
1997	Amanda Gunderson	Reno	19	Miss Northern Counties	Classical Vocal, "Der Hölle Rache kocht in meinem Herzen"			
1996	Annette Albertson	Reno	24	Miss Truckee Meadows	Vocal, "Luck Be a Lady"			
1995	Jennifer Joseph-Lier	Wendover	24	Miss Elko County/Northeast Nevada	Vocal, "I Am Changing"		Non-finalist Talent Award	Contestant on the E! reality show "The Entertainer"
1994	Laura Hubach	Reno	22	Miss Reno	Classical Piano			
1993	Mitzie Cox	Sparks	20	Miss Sparks	Vocal / Dance, "I'm a Brass Band" from Sweet Charity			
1992	Sandra Dornak	Las Vegas	25	Miss Las Vegas	Ventriloquism, "Supercalifragilisticexpialidocious" from Mary Poppins			
1991	Malia Winn	Minden	17	Miss Douglas County	Interpretive Ballet, music from Somewhere in Time			
1990	Tia Marie Zorne	Las Vegas	21	Miss Las Vegas	Acro-Jazz Dance, "Julie's Theme" from American Anthem			
1989	Brenda Linscott	Incline Village	23	Miss Cosmopolitan Counties	Vocal, "Memory" from Cats			
1988	Deborah Schuler	Incline Village	22	Miss Cosmopolitan Counties	Vocal, "The Woman in the Moon" from A Star Is Born			
1987	Stacie James	Las Vegas	23	Miss Las Vegas	Vocal, "On My Own" from Les Misérables	2nd runner-up	Preliminary Talent Award	
1986	Kelsey Kara	Las Vegas	23	Miss Las Vegas	Flamenco Dance			
1985	Sonja Nall	Las Vegas	23	Miss Las Vegas	Classical Ballet en Pointe, "Kitri's Variation" from Don Quixote		Non-finalist Talent Award	
1984	LeAnna Grant	Las Vegas	22	Miss Las Vegas	Vocal, "I Love Paris"			Later Miss Nevada USA 1986
1983	Kim Pacini	Incline Village	24	Miss North Lake Tahoe	Vocal, "You're the Top"			
1982	Kim King	Las Vegas	21	Miss Clark County	Banjo, "Waiting for the Robert E. Lee"			
1981	Suzanne Bowman	Reno	20	Miss Reno	Modern Rhythmic Gymnastics, "Zero to Sixty in Five"			
1980	Phyllis Hamlin	Reno	23	Miss Reno	Piano, Warsaw Concerto			
1979	Jeanne Cangemi	North Lake Tahoe	22	Miss North Lake Tahoe	Classical & Jazz Saxophone, "Harlem Nocturne" & "Csárdás"			
1978	Megan Anderson	Reno	19	Miss Washoe County	Classical Vocal, "Vissi d'arte" from Tosca		Non-finalist Talent Award	
1977	Lori Isom	Las Vegas	18	Miss Clark County	Jazz Dance, "Classical Blues"			
1976	Sandra Kastel	Las Vegas	21	Miss Las Vegas	Vocal, "My Man"		Non-finalist Talent Award	
1975	Sherri Ann Lowe	Las Vegas	21	Miss Las Vegas	Baton Twirling / Variety Act			
1974	Jacqueline Barker	Sparks	19	Miss Sparks	Popular Vocal, "The Way We Were"			
1973	Echo Rost	Sparks	20	Miss Sparks	Modern Jazz Dance, "I Feel the Earth Move"		Neat As A Pin Award (tie)	
1972	Helen Bennett	Reno	23	Miss Reno	Classical Ballet, "Dance of the Gypsy"		Non-finalist Talent Award	
1971	Joan Burachio	Las Vegas	21	Miss Las Vegas	Accordion, "Csárdás"	Top 10		
1970	Vicky Jo Todd	Sparks	20	Miss Sparks	Vocal / Guitar, "Time"		Non-finalist Talent Award	
1969	Karen Wastun	Yerington	21	Miss Lyon County	Dramatic Presentation, "Lizzie" from The Rainmaker			
1968	Sharon Davis	Reno	19	Miss University of Nevada	Classical Vocal, "Quando m'en vò" from La bohème			
1967	Vicky Landeck	Reno	18	Miss Reno	Dramatic Reading, "Ruth, the Moabitess" by N.A. Truell			
1966	Roberta Sharp	Carson City	18	Miss Carson City	Piano			
1965	Kathryn Blaikie	Carson City	18	Miss Carson City	Musical Comedy, "I'm Late"		Preliminary Swimsuit Award	
1964	Ellen Roseman	Sparks	21	Miss South Lake Tahoe	Comedy Skit			
1963	Cheryle Thompson	Las Vegas		Miss Las Vegas	Folk Singing, "My Lover Has Gone"	Top 10		
1962	Audrey Chambers	Las Vegas	19	Miss Reno	Baton Twirling, Fire Baton & Dance			
1961	Sherry Wagner	Reno	19	Miss Reno	Tap Dance, "Oh Them Golden Slippers"			
1960	Nancy Marie Bowen	McGill	19		Humorous Reading & Piano			
1959	Dawn Wells	Reno	20	Miss Reno	Dramatic Reading from Antigone			Played role of Mary Ann on Gilligan's Island
1958	Judy Wadsworth	Sparks	18		Dramatic Monologue from The Lark			
1957	Loni Gravelle	Reno	19	Miss Reno	Piano, "Piano Concerto in A Minor" by Edvard Grieg	Top 10 – 6th place		
1956	Carmen Ruggeroli	Las Vegas	19		Vocal			
1955	Vivienne Potter	Reno	21	Miss Reno	Dramatic Monologue, "An Address to the Jury"			
1954	Janice Elaine Babcock	Reno	18	Miss Reno	Grecian Interpretive Dance			
1953	Jeannine McColl	Las Vegas	18	Miss Las Vegas	Ballet, "Something to Dance About"			
1952	Bonnie LeClaire Wilson	Reno	18	Miss Reno	Ballet, "Something to Dance About"			Assumed the title after the original winner, Sylvia Russell, chose to marry
1951	Donna JoAnn Sollars	Reno	21	Miss Reno	Vocal & Ukulele, "Has Anybody Seen My Gal?" & "Can't Help Lovin' Dat Man"			
1950	Tosca Masini	Sparks	24	Miss Sparks	Comedy Characterization	Top 16 – 7th place		
1949	Carol Lampe	Reno	20		Speech, "4-H"			
1935–1948	No Nevada representative at Miss America pageant							
1934	No national pageant was held							
1933	No Nevada representative at Miss America pageant							
1932	No national pageants were held							
1931	No national pageants were held							
1930	No national pageants were held							
1929	No national pageants were held							
1928	No national pageants were held							
1921–1927	No Nevada representative at Miss America pageant							
