= Miss America 1979 =

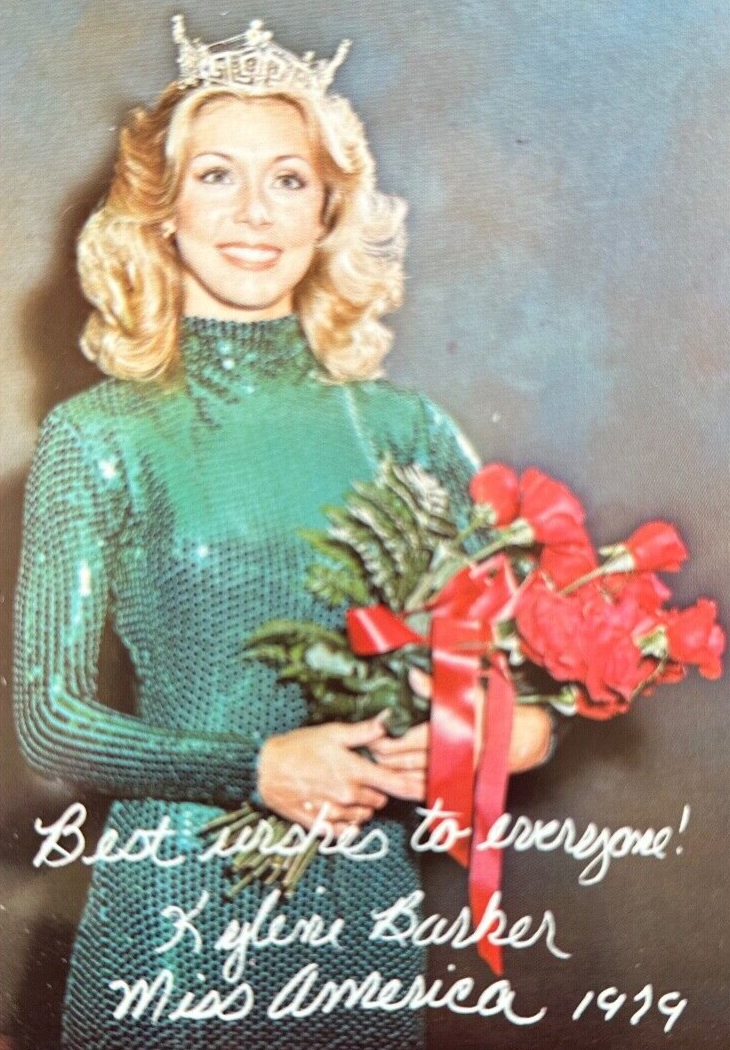
- Kylene Barker as Miss America 1979
- Date: September 9, 1978
- Presenters: Bert Parks
- Venue: Boardwalk Hall, Atlantic City, New Jersey
- Broadcaster: NBC
- Winner: Kylene Barker; Virginia

Miss America 1979, the 52nd Miss America pageant, was held at the Boardwalk Hall in Atlantic City, New Jersey on September 9, 1978, on NBC Network.

Kylene Barker was the first Miss Virginia to win the crown.

== Results ==
=== Placements ===
Placement	Contestant
Miss America 1979	Virginia – Kylene Barker
1st Runner-Up	Alabama – Teresa Cheatham
2nd Runner-Up	Florida – Carolyn Cline
3rd Runner-Up	Ohio – Sher Lynnette Patrick
4th Runner-Up	Washington – Laurie Nelson
Top 10	Kansas – Lori Ann Bergen; Kentucky – Marcia Bell; Louisiana – Phyllis Kelly; Nebraska – Guylyn Remmenga; Texas – Sandi Miller

=== Awards ===
==== Preliminary awards ====
Awards	Contestant
Lifestyle and Fitness	Alabama - Teresa Cheatham (tie); Delaware - Janice Anne Albro; Mississippi - Cheri Brown (tie); Minnesota - Sue Erickson
Talent	Alabama - Teresa Cheatham; Florida - Carolyn Cline (tie); Kansas - Lori Ann Bergen; Nebraska - Guylyn Remmenga (tie)

==== Non-finalist awards ====
Awards	Contestant
Talent	California - Christine Acton; Connecticut - Maryalice Flintroy; Idaho - Kimberly Ann Jensen; Illinois - Debra Carlson; Nevada - Megan Anderson; North Carolina - Deborah Shook; South Carolina - Diane Toole; Wyoming - Kim Pring
