= John Niparko =

John K. Niparko
- Born: Detroit, Michigan, U.S.
- Died: April 25, 2016
- Education: University of Michigan
- Occupations: Surgeon; Scientist; Otolaryngologist

John K. Niparko (1955 – April 25, 2016) was an American surgeon, scientist and otolaryngologist who specialized in cochlear implants. Niparko edited and wrote several chapters of Cochlear Implants: Principles & Practices.

== Early life ==
Niparko was born and raised in Detroit, Michigan. In high school, he became interested in early inner-ear implant devices. He attended the University of Michigan where he received his bachelor degree and medical degree. There, he completed his residency in otolaryngology-head and neck surgery. He also completed a fellowship in neurotology, otology, and skull base surgery.

== Career ==
In 1993, Niparko established the Listening Center at Johns Hopkins Hospital in Baltimore, Maryland. There, he served as the inaugural George T. Nager Professor and director of the Division of Otology, Neurotology and Skull Base Surgery from 2009 to 2012.

Niparko was recognized as an authority on cochlear implants, having implanted Cochlear brand Nucleus implants on former Miss America Heather Whitestone in 1995 and 1999. He also implanted bilateral Advanced Bionics cochlear implants on Auditory-Verbal therapist Sigrid Cerf, wife of Internet pioneer Vint Cerf, who invented e-mail in 1970 because of his own severe hearing loss.

In 2013, Niparko joined the University of Southern California where he was chair of the USC Keck School of Medicine's Caruso Department of Otolaryngology–Head and Neck Surgery. He also founded and directed the USC Caruso Family Center for Childhood Communication. Lastly, he was also responsible for the orderly shutdown of the House Research Institute, which is separate from the House Ear Clinic, seamlessly transferring ongoing research projects to USC Keck and to UCLA.

Niparko conducted research demonstrating that cochlear implants were highly cost effective in children and adults. He led efforts to establish a new national organization to focus on the underutilization of cochlear implants in the United States. This led to the founding of the American Cochlear Implant Alliance in 2011 with a mission to focus on access to cochlear implants.

The John Niparko Lecture at the annual Cochlear Implant Symposium was established by the American Cochlear Implant Alliance in his honor, with ARPANET (Internet) co-inventor Vint Cerf delivering the Inaugural

On April 25, 2016, Niparko died of complications from treatment from a rare genetic-based form of lymphoma at the University of Southern California's Keck Medical Center. He was 61.

== Awards ==
Hearing Research Award (2001) - Deafness Research Foundation
