= Teresa Cheatham =

American beauty pageant contestant

- Born: Teresa Ann Cheatham; December 28, 1957 (age 68); Wellington, Alabama, U.S.
- Other name: Teresa Crosby
- Education: Jacksonville State University
- Height: 5 ft 3 in (1.60 m)
- Spouse: Joe Crosby
- Children: 1
- Beauty pageant titleholder
- Title: Miss Point Mallard 1978; Miss Alabama 1978
- Hair color: Brown
- Eye color: Brown
- Major competitions: Miss America 1979 (1st runner-up)

Teresa Ann Cheatham-Crosby (née Cheatham; born December 28, 1957) is a vocal instructor from Wellington, Alabama who was named Miss Alabama 1978 and finished first runner-up at Miss America 1979.

== Early life ==
She attended Jacksonville State University, graduating in 1979 with a Bachelor of Arts degree in vocal performance with a minor in drama.

== Miss Alabama ==
Entering the statewide pageant as Miss Point Mallard, Cheatham-Crosby won the title of Miss Alabama in 1978. She finished first runner-up at Miss America 1979 on September 9, 1978. She won the talent competition and the swimsuit competition in the Miss America Pageant.

== Life after Miss Alabama ==
Following her reign as Miss Alabama, she toured England, Iceland, and Germany performing as part of the Miss America USO tour along with several other contestants in the pageant.

Cheatham married Tommy Charles "Chuck" Stricklin in Anniston, Alabama on May 26, 1990. Since 2001, she has worked as a vocal instructor at Jacksonville State University.

Awards and achievements
| Preceded by Julie Houston | Miss Alabama; 1978 | Succeeded by Kathy Pickett |
