= Teresa Benitez-Thompson =

American politician from Nevada (born 1978)

- Benitez-Thompson in 2026

Member-elect of the U.S. House of Representatives from Nevada's 2nd district
- Assuming office January 3, 2027
- Succeeding: Mark Amodei

Majority Leader of the Nevada Assembly
- In office November 9, 2016 – November 9, 2022
- Preceded by: Paul Anderson
- Succeeded by: Sandra Jauregui

Member of the Nevada Assembly from the 27th district
- In office November 3, 2010 – November 9, 2022
- Preceded by: Sheila Leslie
- Succeeded by: Angie Taylor

Personal details
- Born: Teresa Francisca Benitez; July 25, 1978 (age 48) Ventura, California, U.S.
- Party: Democratic (1998–present)
- Spouse: Jeff Thompson
- Children: 4
- Education: University of Nevada, Reno (BA); University of Michigan, Ann Arbor (MSW)
- Website: Campaign website

Teresa Francisca Benitez-Thompson (born July 25, 1978) is an American politician and former social worker who is the United States representative-elect from Nevada's 2nd congressional district. Previously, she served in the Nevada Assembly from 2010 to 2022, representing the 27th district in Washoe County. A member of the Democratic Party, she served as majority leader of the Assembly from 2016 to 2022.

Benitez-Thompson was crowned Miss Nevada in 2002 and placed third runner-up at Miss America 2003. In February 2026, she announced her candidacy for the U.S. House of Representatives in Nevada's 2nd congressional district, winning the Democratic nomination and ultimately defeating Republican David Flippo in the general election. She will be the first Democrat to represent the district.

She is the first Latina elected to serve in the U.S. House from Nevada.

== Early life and education ==
Benitez-Thompson was born in Ventura, California, where her parents met. Her father, originally from Guadalajara, struggled with substance abuse. When she was four, her mother separated from him and moved the family to Nevada. Benitez-Thompson was raised with the help of her maternal grandparents and grew up with two sisters. She graduated from McQueen High School in Reno.

She earned a Bachelor of Arts degree in political science from the University of Nevada, Reno and a master's degree in social work from the University of Michigan. As an undergraduate, she began competing in beauty pageants to earn scholarships. She was crowned Miss Nevada in 2002 and placed third runner-up at Miss America 2003.

== Career ==
After college, Benitez-Thompson worked for five years as a licensed social worker helping with adoptions for children with special needs. She then worked for a decade as a social worker for a hospice care company. After leaving the Nevada Assembly, she became chief of staff to Nevada Attorney General Aaron Ford.

== Nevada Assembly ==
First elected in 2010 to represent District 27 in Washoe County, Benitez-Thompson served as Majority Leader of the Nevada Assembly for three terms from 2016 to 2022.

Benitez-Thompson served on the Assembly committees on Health and Human Services, Taxation, Ways and Means, Government Affairs, and Transportation. She chaired Government Affairs and the Ways and Means Subcommittee on Audit, and served as vice chair of Ways and Means. She also served chaired the Legislative Committee on Senior Citizens, Veterans and Adults with Special Needs, and was vice chair of the Interim Committee on Cognitive Needs of Older Persons in Nevada.

=== Elections ===
- 2020 Benitez-Thompson was unopposed in the 2020 Democratic primary and won the general election with 18,559 votes (58.47%) against Republican candidate Barb Hawn.
- 2018 Benitez-Thompson was unopposed in both the primary and general elections.
- 2016 Benitez-Thompson was unopposed in the primary. She won the general election with 15,080 votes (56.56%) against Republican candidate Bonnie Weber, who later became a member of the Reno City Council.
- 2014 Benitez-Thompson was unopposed in the primary and won the general election with 7,793 votes (53.53%) against Republican nominee Rex Crouch.
- 2012 Benitez-Thompson was unopposed in the primary and won the general election with 14,160 votes (57.76%) against Republican nominee Tom Taber, who had previously run for the Assembly in 1990.
- 2010 When Democratic Assemblywoman Sheila Leslie ran for Nevada Senate and left the Assembly seat open, Benitez-Thompson won the primary with 1,451 votes (55.92%) against Byllie Andrews. She won the general election with 6,951 votes (63.57%) against Republican nominee Gabe Jurado.

== 2026 U.S. House of Representatives campaign ==
In February 2026, Benitez-Thompson announced her candidacy for the U.S. House of Representatives in Nevada's 2nd congressional district. The district, which includes Reno, Carson City and much of rural northern Nevada, has never been represented by a Democrat and voted for Donald Trump by 14 percentage points in 2024. In June, she won the Democratic primary with 45.6% of the vote, defeating seven other candidates to become the party's nominee to succeed retiring Republican incumbent Mark Amodei. She ultimately defeated Republican nominee David Flippo in the general election on November 4, 2026. While Benitez-Thompson won only two of the district's 12 county-level jurisdictions, they were the two largest, her home county of Washoe County and the independent city of Carson City. Between them, they have over two-thirds of the district's population. Benitez-Thompson carried Washoe County by 43,900 votes, almost three times her overall margin of 18,600 votes. She also carried Carson City by 1,900 votes. This made her the first Latina elected to serve in the U.S. House from Nevada.

== Policy Positions ==
=== Economics ===
For the 2026 U.S. House of Representatives election, Benitez-Thompson campaigned on affordability, opposition to President Trump's Big Beautiful Bill, and preventing economic disruption due to Artificial Intelligence and the construction of data centers in Northern Nevada.

=== United States-Israel Relationship ===
For the 2026 U.S. House of Representatives election, Benitez-Thompson campaigned on blocking the U.S. from providing unconditional foreign aid to Israel, saying that she wants to block the sale of arms to countries that "have a pattern of violating international human rights and ... countries that block humanitarian aid." She stated that she will not be taking money from AIPAC. She has stated she is willing to have the U.S. aid Israel as long as they comply with U.S. law, "international humanitarian law", and the Ceasefire Compliance Act; she is also willing to allow funding for Israel's Iron Dome defense system. She has pledged to fight antisemitism by supporting funding grants to prevent and prosecute hate crimes, and implementing the SACRED Act.

== Personal life ==
Benitez-Thompson is married to KOLO-TV chief meteorologist, former KRNV-DT chief meteorologist and former KTVN meteorologist Jeff Thompson and has four children.

Awards and achievements
Preceded by Ashley Huff	Miss Nevada; 2002	Succeeded by Christina O'Neil
Nevada Assembly
Preceded by Paul Anderson	Majority Leader of the Nevada Assembly; 2016–2022	Succeeded by Sandra Jauregui
U.S. House of Representatives
Preceded by Mark Amodei	Member of the U.S. House of Representatives from Nevada's 2nd congressional district Taking office 2027	Elect
