= Maria Maldonado (Miss Kentucky) =

American beauty pageant titleholder (born 1982)

- Born: Maria Christina Maldonado; January 8, 1982 (age 44); Lexington, Kentucky
- Education: University of Kentucky
- Beauty pageant titleholder
- Title: Miss Kentucky Teen 1999; Miss Campbellsville Area 2001; Miss Jeffersontown 2002; Miss Metropolitan 2003; Miss Heart of the South 2004; Miss Kentucky 2004
- Hair color: Black
- Eye color: Brown
- Major competition: Miss America 2005

Maria Christina Maldonado Smith (born January 8, 1982) is an American beauty pageant titleholder from Lexington, Kentucky. She was named Miss Kentucky Teen 1999 and crowned Miss Kentucky 2004. She competed for the Miss America 2005 title.

== Pageant career ==
=== Miss Kentucky Teen 1999 ===
In 1999, Maldonado won the title of Miss Lexington Teen. At the state pageant, she was selected as Miss Kentucky Teen. At the time, there was no national pageant beyond this state title as the first Miss America's Outstanding Teen pageant was held in August 2005.

=== Vying for Miss Kentucky ===
In 2001, Maldonado won the Miss Campbellsville Area title. She competed as one of 31 qualifiers in the 2001 Miss Kentucky pageant with the platform "Increasing Public Awareness of Tourette Syndrome" and a vocal performance in the talent portion of the competition. She was named third runner-up to winner Monica Hardin.

In October 2001, Maldonado won the Miss Jeffersontown 2002 title and became one of 32 qualifiers for the 2002 Miss Kentucky pageant. She competed with the platform "Renewing Our Commitment to Special Education" and a vocal performance in the talent portion of the competition. She was named second runner-up to winner Mary Catherine Correll.

In November 2002, Maldonado won the Miss Metropolitan 2003 title. She was one of the 32 qualifiers for the 2003 Miss Kentucky pageant. She competed on a platform of "Renewing Our Commitment to Special Education" and a vocal performance in the talent portion of the competition. She was named third runner-up to winner MacKenzie Mayes.

=== Miss Kentucky 2004 ===
Maldonado was crowned Miss Heart of the South 2004 which made her eligible to compete at the 2004 Miss Kentucky pageant. She entered the state pageant in June 2004 as one of 31 qualifiers. Maldonado's competition talent was a vocal performance and her platform was "All Kinds of Minds".

Maldonado won the competition on Saturday, June 10, 2004, when she received her crown from outgoing Miss Kentucky titleholder MacKenzie Mayes. She earned more than $10,000 in scholarship money from the state pageant, plus use of an apartment and a Ford Explorer during her reign. As Miss Kentucky, her activities included public appearances across the state of Kentucky.

Maldonado was Kentucky's representative at the Miss America 2005 pageant in Atlantic City, New Jersey, in September 2004. She was not a finalist for the national title but won the Non-Finalist Interview Award and a combined $8,000 in scholarship prizes during the pageant.

== Early life and education ==
Maldonado is a native of Lexington, Kentucky, and a 2000 graduate of Lafayette High School. She is a 2004 graduate of the University of Kentucky. She married her husband, Dan Smith, in 2005.

Awards and achievements
Preceded by MacKenzie Mayes	Miss Kentucky; 2004	Succeeded by Kerri Mitchell
