= Heather Whitestone =

American former beauty queen and conservative activist

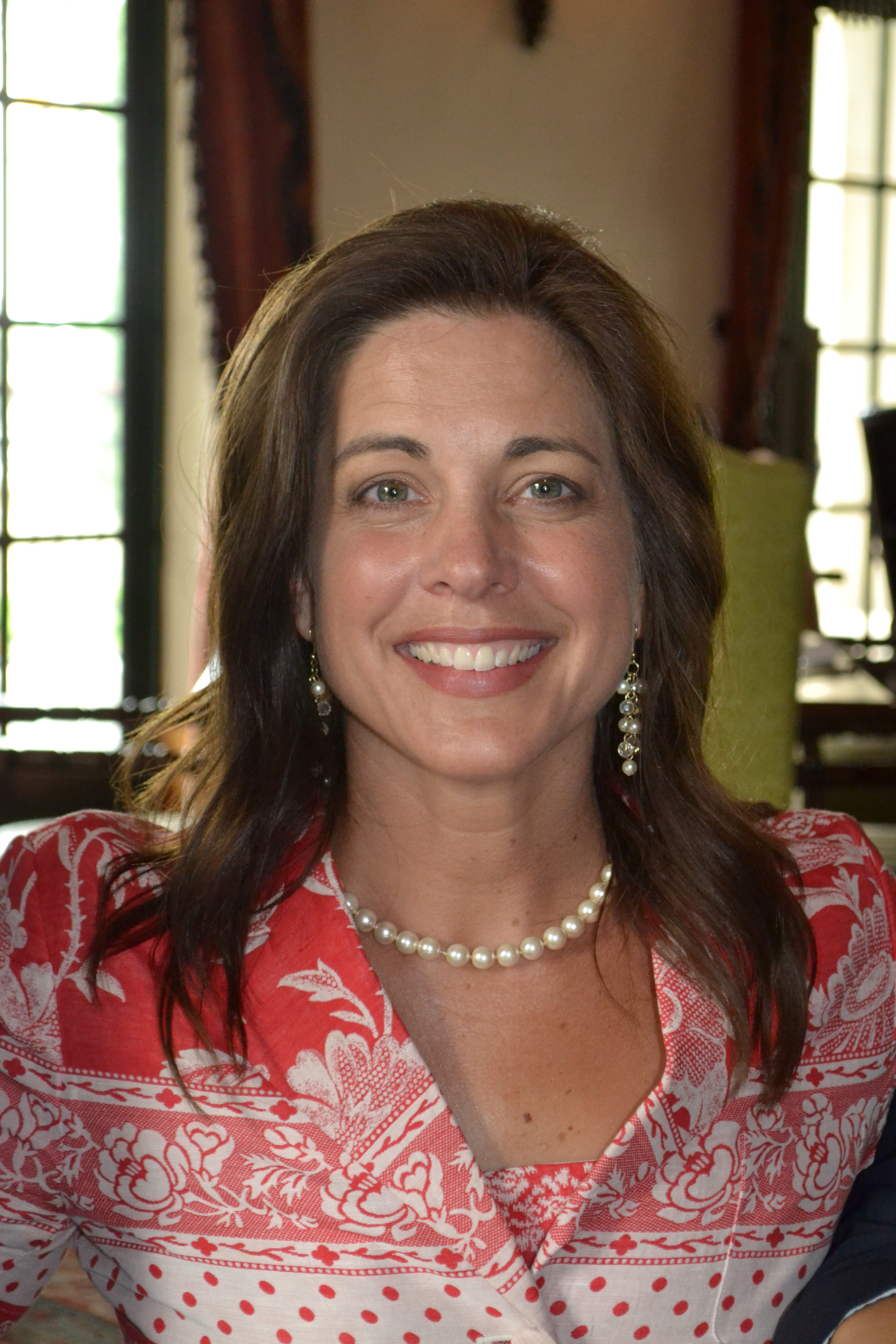
- Whitestone in 2012
- Born: Heather Leigh Whitestone; February 24, 1973 (age 53); Dothan, Alabama, U.S.
- Education: Jacksonville State University
- Occupations: Motivational speaker and author
- Known for: First deaf Miss America
- Title: Miss Alabama 1994; Miss America 1995
- Predecessor: Kimberly Clarice Aiken
- Successor: Shawntel Smith
- Political party: Republican
- Spouse: John McCallum (m. 1996)
- Children: 4

Heather Leigh Whitestone McCallum (born February 24, 1973) is an American conservative activist and beauty queen who was the first deaf Miss America title holder, having lost most of her hearing at 18 months.

== Early life and education ==
Whitestone was born in Dothan, Alabama, to Bill Whitestone and Daphne Gray. When she was 18 months old, she lost her hearing due to a serious ear infection. In fourth grade, she learned about the story of Helen Keller, who would forever change her life. Keller became her role model. She was unable to keep up with her classwork and began to fall behind her peers. She asked her family to send her to a special school that would enable her to catch up with other students in her class. While at the Central Institute for the Deaf in St. Louis, Missouri, she learned two grade levels per year. After three years, she caught up with her peers and returned to Alabama to graduate from public high school with a 3.6-grade point average (GPA).

Whitestone moved to Birmingham at age sixteen, following her parents' divorce. She attended the Alabama School of Fine Arts for a year and graduated from Berry High School (now Hoover High School) in 1991. Her passion was ballet, and she had spent most of her time developing her ballet skills, especially after hearing loss. She then went on to study at Jacksonville State University.

== Pageant record ==
Whitestone first participated in the Shelby County Junior Miss program. While not actually a beauty pageant, the experience gave her the confidence to begin entering pageants. Her first year in the Miss America system, she won the Miss Jacksonville State University title, and went on to be Miss Alabama. She stood next to Miss Virginia (Cullen Johnson) in the finals of the Miss America 1995 pageant. When the first runner-up was announced, she could not hear the host, Regis Philbin, but could read his lips. Surprised, she looked to her fellow contestant for confirmation that she had won.

As Miss America, Whitestone showcased her S.T.A.R.S. program around the country. S.T.A.R.S. stands for "Success Through Action and Realization of your dreams". It has five points: positive attitude, belief in a dream, the willingness to work hard, facing obstacles, and building a strong support team.

Whitestone also served as an executive member on the President's Committee on Employment of People Disabilities. She has written four books.

== After Miss America ==
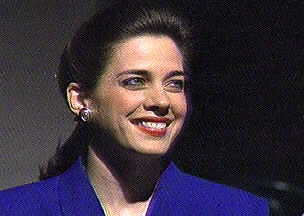
Whitestone in 1997

Since her Miss America win, Whitestone has completed her studies at Jacksonville State University and continued to promote awareness of deaf issues. She has also spoken out in detail about what she describes as her close relationship with God that she rediscovered as a teenager. She wrote about her life experiences in her third book, Let God Surprise You: Trust God with Your Dreams.

A volunteer for Republican causes, she spoke at the party's National Conventions of 1996 and 2000, for GOP presidential nominees Bob Dole and George W. Bush.

In 2002, Whitestone elected to have a cochlear implant operation in order to hear to an extent in her right ear, the hearing of which she had lost at 18 months. It was implanted by Dr. John Niparko on August 6 at Johns Hopkins Hospital in Baltimore and activated on September 19. She said the primary motivation for electing the surgery was an incident when she did not hear her son's cries for help. She said that she had not regretted her decision, thanking her family for supporting her.

Whitestone is a motivational speaker and lives in Georgia with her husband, John McCallum, whom she met when he served as a Congressional aide to Speaker Newt Gingrich. They have four children named John Jr., James, Wilson, and William.

Whitestone was appointed by President Bush and confirmed by the US Senate to the National Council on Disability, but she resigned in 2010. She was also a board member of the Helen Keller Foundation for Research and Education from 1995 to 2002.

Whitestone was appointed to the Advisory Council for the National Institutes of Health on Deafness and Other Communication Disorders, in 2002.

Whitestone has appeared on CNN, ABC's Good Morning America and The View. She has also been in print articles for USA Today and People Magazine.

In 2003, Whitestone filmed two public service announcements to bring awareness about "Dogs for the Deaf", which is a hearing-dog organization.

Whitestone became a spokesperson for the Starkey Hearing Aid Foundation and Cochlear America.

Whitestone has written four books called Listening with My Heart, Believing in the Promise, Let God Surprise You, and Heavenly Crowns. She has also spearheaded the nation's largest multimedia public service campaign to identify early hearing loss, which was created by the Miss America Organization and the Alexander Graham Bell Association for the Deaf.

=== Bibliography ===
- Listening with My Heart (1997) ISBN 0-385-48675-8
- Believing the Promise (1999) ISBN 0-310-24628-8
- Let God Surprise You (2003) ISBN 0-385-49507-2
- Heavenly Crowns (2004) ISBN 0-310-24627-X

Awards and achievements
Preceded by Kalyn Chapman	Miss Alabama; 1994	Succeeded by Amie Beth Dickinson
Preceded by Kimberly Clarice Aiken	Miss America; 1995	Succeeded by Shawntel Smith
