= Kalyn Chapman =

American model

- Born: Kalyn Evel Chapman; 1970 or 1971 (age 55–56); Mobile, Alabama, U.S.
- Education: Loyola University New Orleans; University of South Alabama; University of Alabama at Birmingham
- Beauty pageant titleholder
- Title: Miss University of South Alabama 1991; Miss Mobile Area 1992; Miss Leeds Area 1993; Miss Alabama 1993
- Major competition: Miss America 1994

Kalyn Chapman James is an American model, television host, and beauty pageant titleholder from Mobile, Alabama, who was crowned Miss Alabama in 1993, the first African American to win the pageant. She competed for the Miss America 1994 title and placed as a top-ten semi-finalist.

== Pageant career ==
Chapman was the first African-American to win the Miss University of South Alabama title then competed in the 1991 Miss Alabama pageant. She was named was first runner-up to winner Wendy Neuendorf. The next year she was the first African-American named Miss Mobile Area and two weeks before competing she injured her right knee in an accident on the beach. She placed second runner-up for the Miss Alabama 1992 crown behind winner Kim Wimmer and first runner-up Heather Whitestone.

Chapman was crowned Miss Leeds Area 1993 which made her eligible to compete at the 1993 Miss Alabama pageant, her third attempt at the state title. Entering the state pageant in June 1993 as one of 45 finalists, Chapman's preliminary competition talent for Miss Alabama was performing a modern dance routine to "The River" by Duke Ellington. Her platform was improving education for Alabama's children.

Chapman won the competition on Saturday, June 19, 1993, when she received her crown from outgoing Miss Alabama titleholder Kim Wimmer. Chapman became the first African American to be named Miss Alabama. As Miss Alabama, her activities included public appearances across the state of Alabama, including hosting regional beauty pageants and speaking to student and civic groups.

Chapman was Alabama's representative at the Miss America 1994 pageant in Atlantic City, New Jersey, in September 1993. Her competition talent was modern dance. She was Top 10 semi-finalist for the national title.

Her reign as Miss Alabama continued until Heather Whitestone was crowned on June 18, 1994. Chapman now awards an annual scholarship called the Kalyn Chapman James Scholarship for $1,000 that is awarded to the highest scoring African-American contestant to encourage excellence in African-American participation in the Miss Alabama Pageant.

== Personal life and education ==
Chapman is a native of Mobile, Alabama, and graduated from Murphy High School in 1988. After graduation, she traveled the country to teach dance camps at colleges throughout the country for Memphis-based Universal Dance Association. In the fall, she attended Loyola University New Orleans. She attended an audition for a Walt Disney show while in New Orleans and was the only candidate selected to perform in The Dick Tracy Show at Disney-MGM Studios in Orlando, Florida, where she stayed for one year. She suffered a knee injury and returned to Mobile to complete her degree. She never returned to Loyola University. After regrouping, she attended the University of South Alabama from 1990 until her reign as Miss Alabama interrupted her studies in 1993. She completed her Bachelor of Science degree in psychology from the University of Alabama at Birmingham (UAB) in 1997.

Shortly after her reign as Miss Alabama, Chapman married Terry Roller in 1994 and was known professionally as Kalyn Chapman-Roller. That marriage officially ended in 1998. In February 1999, Birmingham Magazine named her one of Birmingham, Alabama's "most beautiful people". She married Rico James in 2003 and is now known professionally as Kalyn Chapman James. They have two daughters, Phoenix and Zen. Chapman has lived in Miami, Florida, since 2003.

Since passing on the Miss Alabama crown, Chapman has worked as a model, dancer, choreographer, voiceover talent, television host, event emcee, fitness instructor, actor, a Fox Sports Network reporter, spokeswoman for VisionLand, teaching artist for the non-profit Arts for Learning, and is currently the Corporate Sponsorship Coordinator at the Adrienne Arsht Center for the Performing Arts. She was the featured actor in national and international television commercials for Tia Lusso liqueur and Old Navy Bermuda Shorts, and her family has appeared in television commercials for Sanibel Island Tourism, Hershey's Air Delights, Zurich Insurance, Disney Parks, Crocs, and other clients. Kalyn has danced professionally in Miami for Univision on Sabado Gigante and Despirita America and has also performed in awards shows with artists including the rock group Jet, Wisin y Yandel, Alejandro Sans, And Don Omar for The MTV Video Music Awards, the Latin MTV Video Music Awards and the Premios Juventud awards show. Since February 2013, she has been the host of the television series Art Loft for WPBT.

Of the Dallas police officers killed in 2016, in a video entitled "I don't want to feel this way...", she said, "I'm dealing with a bit of guilt because I don't feel sad for the officers that lost their lives, and I know that that's not really my heart. I value human life. And I want to feel sad for them but I can't help but feeling like the shooter was a martyr. And I know it's not the right way to feel because nobody deserves to lose their lives." Her employer, WPBT, said they "[do] not condone" her comments and she was placed on administrative leave.

Awards and achievements
Preceded by Kim Wimmer	Miss Alabama; 1993	Succeeded by Heather Whitestone
