= Miss Alabama =

Beauty pageant competition

- Type: Beauty pageant
- Headquarters: Birmingham
- Location: Alabama
- Members: Miss America
- Official language: English
- Website: www.missalabama.com

The Miss Alabama competition is the pageant that selects the representative for the state of Alabama in the annual Miss America Competition.

Alabama has won four Miss America titles: Abbie Stockard in 2025, Deidre Downs in 2005, Heather Whitestone (the first deaf woman to win the Miss America crown) in 1995, and Yolande Betbeze in 1951. Betbeze refused to pose in a swimsuit, causing swimsuit sponsor Catalina Swimwear to pull out and ultimately start the Miss USA pageant.

Ruby Tilghman of Panama City, Florida was crowned Miss Alabama on June 6, 2026, at Samford University's Wright Center in Birmingham, Alabama. She competed for the title of Miss America 2027 on September 6, 2026, at the Kravis Center for the Performing Arts in West Palm Beach, Florida.

== Gallery of past titleholders ==
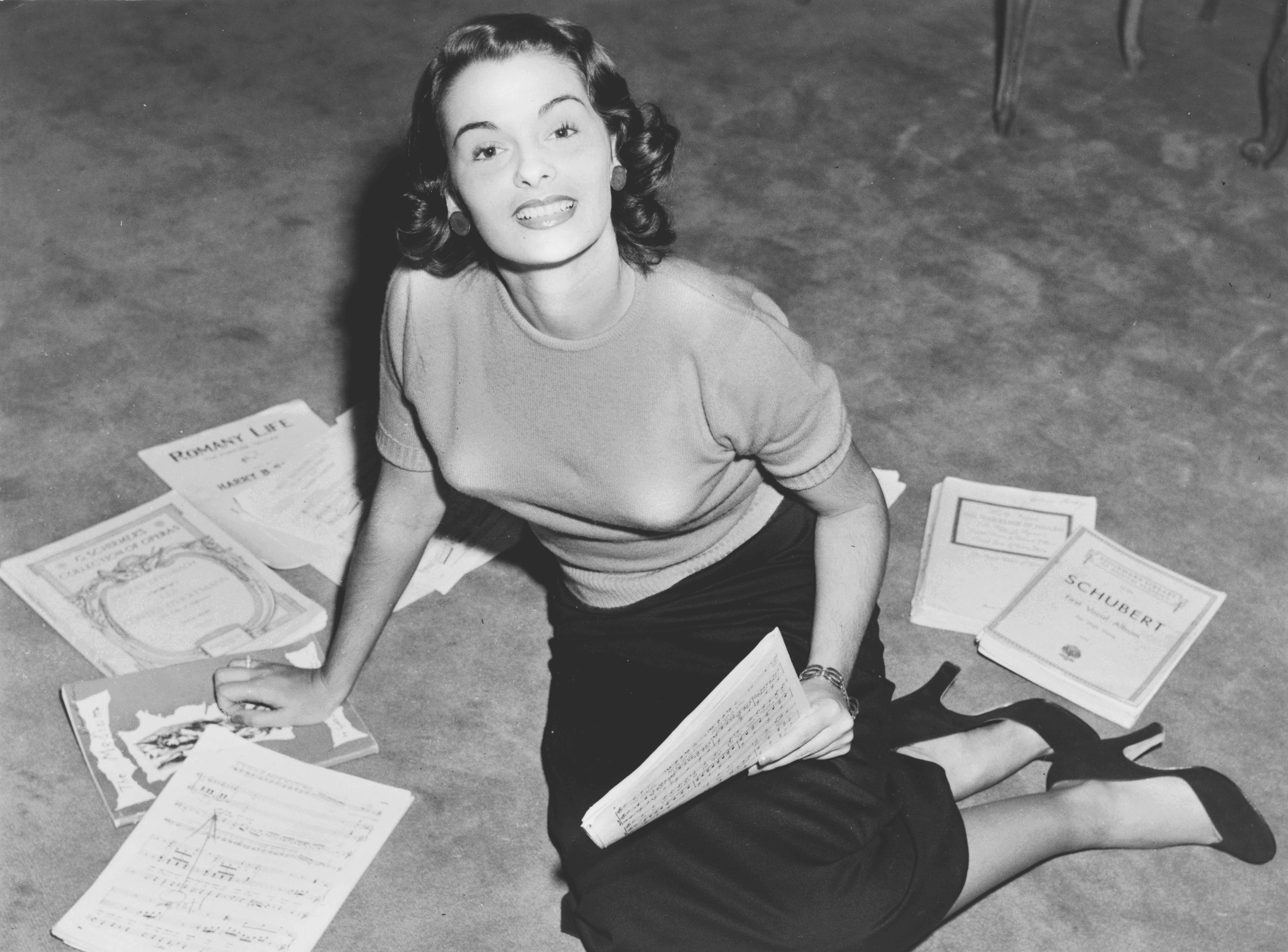
Yolande Betbeze,
Miss Alabama 1950 and Miss America 1951

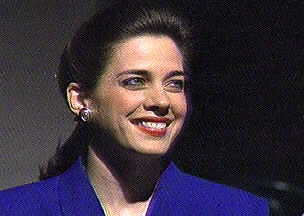
Heather Whitestone,
Miss Alabama 1994 and Miss America 1995

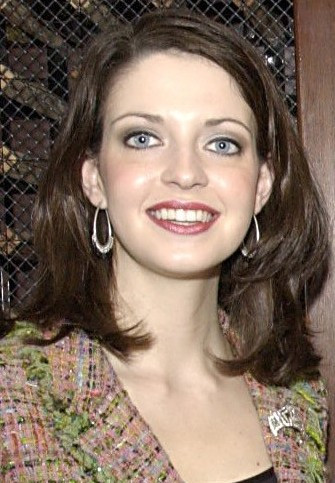
Deidre Downs,
Miss Alabama 2004 and Miss America 2005

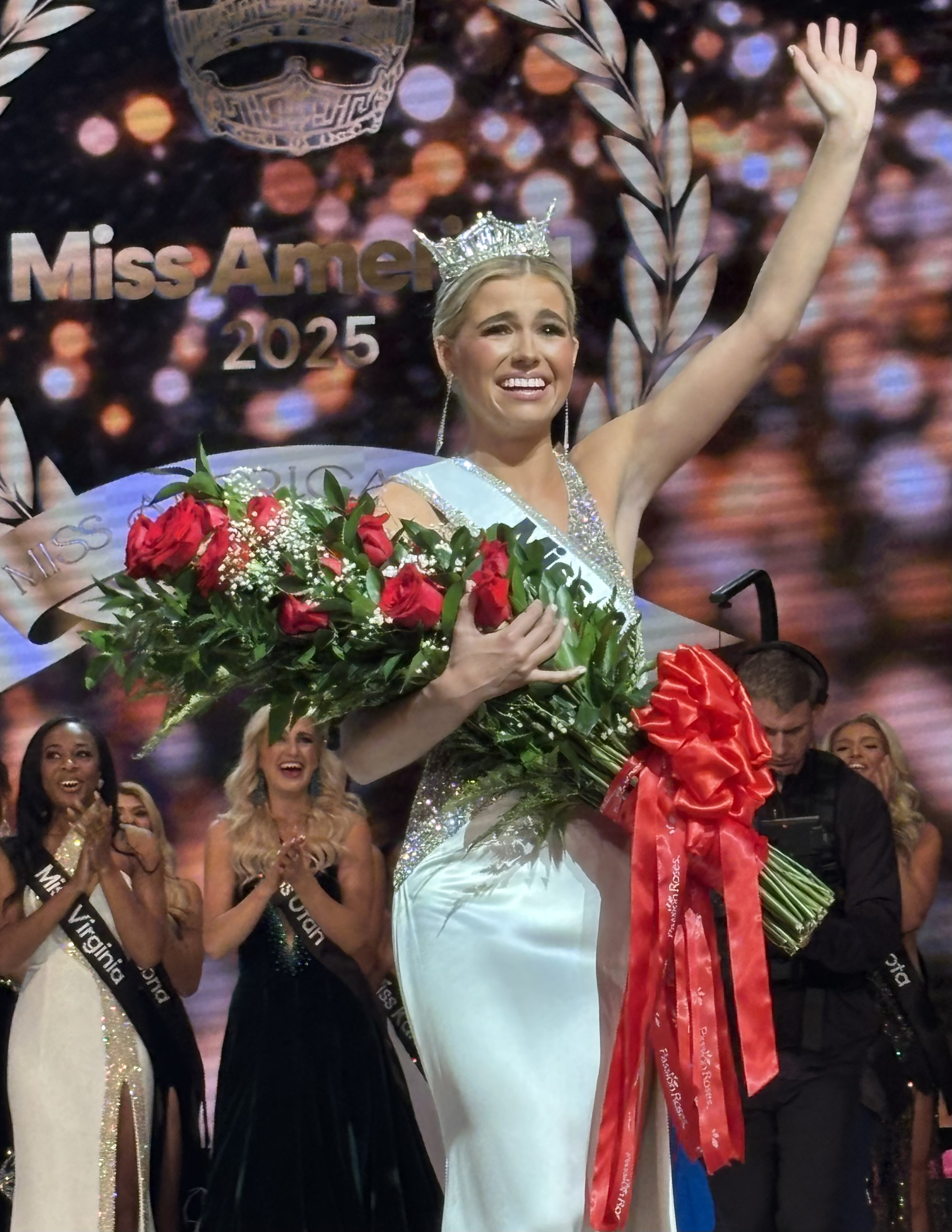
Abbie Stockard,
Miss Alabama 2024 and Miss America 2025

== Results summary ==
The following is a visual summary of the past results of Miss Alabama titleholders at the national Miss America pageants/competitions. The year in parentheses indicates the year of the national competition during which a placement and/or award was garnered, not the year attached to the contestant's state title.

=== Placements ===
- Miss Americas: Yolande Betbeze (1951), Heather Whitestone (1995), Deidre Downs (2005), Abbie Stockard (2025)
- 1st runners-up: Teresa Cheatham (1979), Paige Phillips (1981), Scarlotte Deupree (2003), Lauren Bradford (2022)
- 2nd runners-up: Frances Dorn (1945), Martha Ann Ingram (1948), Anne Ariail (1957), Pam Battles (1984), Alexa Jones (2006)
- 3rd runners-up: Peggy June Elder (1947), Gwen Harmon (1953), Virginia McDavid (1954), Yolanda Fernandez (1983), Alison McCreary (1997)
- 4th runners-up: Gloria Levinge (1936), Betty Jane Rase (1944), Angela Tower (1986), Jenny Jackson (1989), Melinda Toole (2007), Meg McGuffin (2016), Emma Terry (2026)
- Top 7: Jessica Procter (2018), Tiara Pennington (2020)
- Top 10: Marie Duncan (1942), Jeanne Moody (1952), Marilyn Tate (1955), Patricia Huddleston (1956), Lee Thornberry (1959), Teresa Rinaldi (1961), Delores Hodgens (1962), Judy Short (1964), Vickie Powers (1965), Linda Folsom (1966), Angie Grooms (1967), Dellynne Catching (1969), Angela Callahan (1987), Kalyn Chapman (1994), Leigh Sherer (1996), Julie Smith (2000), Jana Sanderson (2001), Caitlin Brunell (2015), Callie Walker (2019)
- Top 12: Anna Laura Bryan (2013)
- Top 13: Courtney Porter (2012)
- Top 15: Tommy Marie Peck (1936), Mildred Oxford (1938), Florine Holt (1939), Virginia McGraw (1941), Catherine Crosby (2004), Amanda Tapley (2009)

=== Awards ===
==== Preliminary awards ====
- Preliminary Evening Gown: Brianna Burrell (2024)
- Preliminary Lifestyle and Fitness: Marie Duncan (1942), Betty Jane Rase (1944), Peggy Elder (1947), Yolande Betbeze (1951), Gwen Harmon (1953), Judy Short (1964), Dellynne Catching (1969), Teresa Cheatham (1979), Angela Tower (1986), Heather Whitestone (1995), Ashley Davis (2011)
- Preliminary Talent: Gloria Levinge (1936), Virginia McGraw (1941), Betty Jane Rase (1944), Frances Dorn (1945), Emma Dale Nunnally (1946), Jeanne Moody (1952), Patricia Huddleston (1956), Anne Ariail (1957), Lee Thornberry (1959), Teresa Rinaldi (1961), Judy Short (1964), Vickie Powers (1965), Linda Folsom (1966), Suzanne Dennie (1971), Teresa Cheatham (1979), Paige Phillips (1981), Heather Whitestone (1995)

==== Non-finalist awards ====
- Non-finalist Talent: Anna Stange (1958), Betty Lindstrom (1960), Patricia Bonner (1963), Kathy Pickett (1980), Tammy Little (1985), Chandler Champion (2014)
- Non-finalist Interview: Resha Riggins (1991)

==== Other awards ====
- Miss Congeniality: Toula Hagestratou (1943), Melinda Toole (2007)
- Children's Miracle Network (CMN) Miracle Maker Award: Hayley Barber (2017)
- CMN Miracle Maker Award 2nd runners-up: Jamie Langley (2008), Callie Walker (2019)
- Jean Bartel Social Impact Initiative Winner: Lauren Bradford (2022)
- Jean Bartel Social Impact Initiative Finalists: Lindsay Fincher (2022)
- Quality of Life Award Winners: Kim Wimmer (1993), Alison McCreary (1997), Catherine Crosby (2004), Deidre Downs (2005), Anna Laura Bryan (2013), Caitlin Brunell (2015), Hayley Barber (2017), Jessica Procter (2018)
- Quality of Life Award 1st runners-up: Heather Whitestone (1995), Scarlotte Deupree (2000) Scarlotte Deupree (2003) Lindsay Fincher (2022)
- Quality of Life Award 2nd runners-up: Julie Smith (2000), Alexa Jones (2006), Melinda Toole (2007), Amanda Tapley (2009), Meg McGuffin (2016), Emma Terry (2026)
- Quality of Life Award Finalists: Resha Riggins (1991), Leigh Sherer (1996), Jamie Langley (2008), Liz Cochran (2010), Ruby Tilghman (2027)
- STEM Scholarship Award Winners: Hayley Barber (2017); Lauren Bradford (2022)
- Top Fundraiser 1st runner-ups: Lauren Bradford (2022)
- Women in Business Scholarship Award Finalists: Lauren Bradford (2022)
- AHA Go Red for Women Leadership Award Regional Winner: Abbie Stockard (2025), Emma Terry (2026)

== Winners ==
- Declared as winner
- Ended as a runner-up
- Ended as a finalist or semi-finalist

Year	Name	Hometown	Age	Local Title	Miss America Talent	Placement at Miss America	Special scholarships at Miss America	Notes
2026	Ruby Tilghman	Panama City, FL	22	Miss Birmingham	Vocal, "I Dreamed A Dream"		Quality of Life Award Finalist	Previously Miss Florida's Outstanding Teen 2021 Eligible as a student at the University of Alabama
2025	Emma Terry	Leeds	22	Miss Hoover	Ballet en Pointe	4th Runner-Up	AHA Go Red for Women Leadership Award Regional Winner Quality of Life 2nd Runner-Up	1st runner-up at Miss Alabama's Outstanding Teen 2020, later assumed title after Marcelle LeBlanc won Miss America's Outstanding Teen 2022
2024	Abbie Stockard	Vestavia	21	Miss Hoover	Dance	Winner	AHA Go Red for Women Leadership Award Regional Winner	
2023	Brianna Burrell	Mobile	25	Miss Baldwin County	Vocal		Preliminary Evening Gown Award	
2022	Lindsay Fincher	Wedowee	22	Miss University of Alabama	Jazz Dance, "Bossa Nova Baby"		Jean Bartel Social Impact Initiative 1st runner up	
2021	Lauren Bradford	Gulf Shores	21	Miss Jefferson County	Violin	1st runner-up	Jean Bartel Social Impact Initiative Winner South Dakota University STEM Scholarship Top Fundraiser 2nd Place Women in Business Finalist	Previously Miss Alabama's Outstanding Teen 2017 after Jessica Baeder was crowned Miss America's Outstanding Teen 2018
2019–20 (Note: Titleholder extended to a second year in 2020 after state and national pageants postponed due to the COVID-19 pandemic)	Tiara Pennington	Helena	20	Miss University of Alabama	Classical Vocal, "Nessun Dorma" from Turandot	Top 7		Previously Miss Alabama's Outstanding Teen 2016; Top 11 at Miss America's Outstanding Teen 2017 pageant
2018	Callie Walker	Birmingham	20	Miss Tuscaloosa	Ballet en Pointe, "Hoe-Down" from Rodeo	Top 10	CMN Miracle Maker Award 2nd runner-up	Daughter of Miss Alabama 1985, Angela Tower Walker Previously Miss Alabama's Outstanding Teen 2012
2017	Jessica Procter	Tuscaloosa	21	Miss Leeds Area	Vocal, "Over the Rainbow"	Top 7	Quality of Life Award Winner	Previously Miss Alabama's Outstanding Teen 2013; 2nd runner-up at Miss America's Outstanding Teen 2014 pageant
2016	Hayley Barber	Pelham	22	Miss Shelby County	Tap Dance, "Big Noise from Winnetka"		Quality of Life Award Winner STEM Scholarship Award CMN Miracle Maker Award	Contestant at National Sweetheart 2013 pageant
2015	Meg McGuffin	Ozark	22	Miss Phenix City	Jazz Ballet en Pointe, "Enigma Variation" from The Matrix	4th runner up	Quality of Life Award 2nd runner-up	Previously Miss Alabama's Outstanding Teen 2007
2014	Caitlin Brunell	Tuscaloosa	22	Miss Leeds Area	Dance, "Let It Go" from Frozen	Top 10	Quality of Life Award Winner	Daughter of former NFL quarterback, Mark Brunell Previously Miss Virginia's Outstanding Teen 2007; Previously Miss America's Outstanding Teen 2008
2013	Chandler Champion	Leeds	20	Miss Leeds Area	Jazz Ballet en Pointe, "Top Secret"		Non-finalist Talent Award	Older sister of Zoe Champion, Miss Alabama's Outstanding Teen 2019
2012	Anna Laura Bryan	Decatur	22	Miss Hoover	Vocal, "Sempre Libera" from La Traviata	Top 12	Quality of Life Award Winner Duke of Edinburgh Silver Medal	
2011	Courtney Porter	Clay	24	Miss Leeds Area	Tap Dance, "I Got Rhythm"	Top 13		Chosen by fellow contestants as the "Wild Card," earning her a spot in the Top 13
2010	Ashley Davis	Dothan	21	Miss West Central Alabama	Vocal, "If I Had My Way"		Preliminary Swimsuit Award	
2009	Liz Cochran	Helena	20	Miss Hoover	Dance, "He Lives in You"		Quality of Life Award Finalist	
2008	Amanda Tapley	Birmingham	20	Miss Samford University	Classical Piano	Top 15	Quality of Life Award 2nd runner-up	Was awarded a "Golden Sash" on Miss America: Countdown to the Crown, earning a spot in the Top 15 at the Miss America 2009 pageant
2007	Jamie Langley	Wadley	24	Miss Painted Rock	Vocal, "Listen"		CMN Miracle Maker Award 2nd runner-up Quality of Life Award Finalist	
2006	Melinda Toole	Birmingham	23	Miss Samford University	Vocal, "Time to Say Goodbye"	4th runner-up	Miss Congeniality Quality of Life Award 2nd runner-up	
2005	Alexa Jones	Andalusia	24	Miss Mobile	Ballet en Pointe, "Fuego"	2nd runner-up	Quality of Life Award 2nd runner-up	
2004	Shannon Camper	Gadsden		Miss West Central Alabama	Vocal	Did not compete; originally 1st runner-up, later assumed the title after Downs won Miss America 2005 title		
2004	Deidre Downs	Birmingham	24	Miss Leeds Area	Vocal, "I'm Afraid This Must Be Love"	Winner	Quality of Life Award Winner	
2003	Catherine Crosby	Brewton	23	Miss Homewood Area	Flute, "Riverdance"	Top 15	Quality of Life Award Winner Active International For Business & Marketing	
2002	Scarlotte Deupree	Birmingham	22	Miss Camellia	Vocal, "Holding Out for a Hero"	1st runner-up	Quality of Life Award 1st runner-up	
2001	Kelly Jones	Birmingham	24	Miss Homewood Area	Classical Piano, "Ballade No. 1 in G Minor"			
2000	Jana Suzanne Sanderson	Gadsden	21	Miss Samford University	Vocal, "I'm a Woman"	Top 10		Jana Suzanne Sanderson McEachern died at age 43 on December 16, 2022 in Gadsden, Alabama.
1999	Julie Smith	Birmingham	23	Miss Chattahoochee Valley	Marimba, "Flight of the Bumblebee" & Csárdás" medley	Top 10	Quality of Life Award 2nd runner-up	Competed with her younger twin sisters, Jill and Jennifer, at Miss Alabama 1997 pageant
1998	Ashley Halfman	Birmingham	23	Miss Cullman Area	Ballet en Pointe, "Everybody Says Don't"			Previously Alabama's Junior Miss 1993
1997	Beth Stomps	Mobile	20	Miss Alabama Music Hall of Fame	Vocal, "Love Changes Everything" from Aspects of Love			
1996	Alison McCreary	Florence	22	Miss Samford University	Vocal, "How Great Thou Art"	3rd runner-up	Quality of Life Award Winner	
1995	Leigh Sherer	Jasper	22	Miss Walker County	Piano / Vocal Medley from Carmen	Top 10	Quality of Life Award Finalist	Current Mu Alpha Sigma Alumni (Former State and Local Contestants) coordinator of the Miss Alabama pageant under married name, Leigh Seirafi
1994	Amie Beth Dickinson			Miss Samford University		Did not compete; later assumed title after Whitestone was crowned Miss America 1995		
1994	Heather Whitestone	Birmingham	21	Miss Cullman Area	Ballet en Pointe, "Via Dolorosa"	Winner	Preliminary Swimsuit Award Preliminary Talent Award Quality of Life Award 1st runner-up	First deaf woman crowned Miss Alabama and Miss America
1993	Kalyn Evel Chapman	Mobile	21	Miss Leeds Area	Modern Dance, "The River"	Top 10		First African-American Miss Alabama
1992	Kim Wimmer	Mobile	21	Miss Point Mallard	Vocal, "Hold On" from The Secret Garden		Quality of Life Award Winner	Previously Alabama's Junior Miss 1989
1991	Wendy Neuendorf	Birmingham	22	Miss Auburn University	Vocal Comedy, "They Can't Take That Away From Me"			Previously Miss Georgia Teen USA 1986
1990	Resha Riggins	Trussville	24	Miss Alabama Music Hall of Fame	Vocal, "Cry"		Non-finalist Interview Award Quality of Life Award Finalist	
1989	Julie Coons	Birmingham	20	Miss Hope	Vocal, "For Once In My Life"			
1988	Jenny Jackson	Auburn	21	Miss Auburn University	Classical Piano, "Warsaw Concerto"	4th runner-up		
1987	Kym Williams	Birmingham	22	Miss All-American Bowl	Vocal, "If We Only Have Love"			Assumed title after Hitt resigned
1987	Julie Hitt	Birmingham	25	Miss Classic		N/A		Resigned because she felt she would not be able to fulfill responsibilities of the title
1986	Angela Callahan	Birmingham	20	Miss All-American Bowl	Piano, "The Windmills of Your Mind"	Top 10		
1985	Angela Tower	Birmingham	25	Miss Jefferson County	Ballet en Pointe, "Chariots of Fire"	4th runner-up	Preliminary Swimsuit Award	Toured with 1986 Miss America Gillette Show Troupe Mother of Miss Alabama's Outstanding Teen 2010, Scarlett Walker, and Miss Alabama's Outstanding Teen 2012 and Miss Alabama 2018, Callie Walker
1984	Tammy Little	Section	23	Miss Hoover Area	Vocal, "Hit Me With a Hot Note" from Sophisticated Ladies		Non-finalist Talent Award	
1983	Pam Battles	Muscle Shoals	21	Miss Dixie	Piano, Medley of George Gershwin pieces	2nd runner-up		
1982	Yolanda Fernandez	Troy	19	Miss Troy State University	Classical Piano, "Fantasie Impromptu"	3rd runner-up		Previously Florida's Junior Miss 1980 Reporter for WFLA-TV Channel 8
1981	Phoebe Stone	Huntsville	22	Miss Eastwood	Ballet, "Mame"			
1980	Paige Phillips	Leeds	17	Miss Leeds Area	Double Ventriloquism / Vocal, "Rock-a-Bye Your Baby with a Dixie Melody," "Swanee," & "Mame"	1st runner-up	Preliminary Talent Award	
1979	Kathy Pickett	Mulga	26	Miss Birmingham	Classical Vocal, "Sempre Libera" from La Traviata		Non-finalist Talent Award	
1978	Teresa Cheatham	Wellington	20	Miss Point Mallard	Semi-classical Vocal, "And This Is My Beloved"	1st runner-up	Preliminary Swimsuit Award Preliminary Talent Award	
1977	Julie Houston	Heflin	22	Miss Oak Mountain	Banjo, "Beverly Hillbillies Theme"			
1976	Denise Davis	Russellville	18	Miss Mannequins	Popular Vocal			Toured with Miss America USO Troupe
1975	Susie Vaughn	Florence	21	Miss University of North Alabama	Classical Vocal, "Vilja" from The Merry Widow			
1974	Pam Long	Florence	20	Miss Florence State University	Ventriloquism			Screenwriter of soap opera Guiding Light
1973	Jane Rice	Huntsville	21	Miss Jacksonville State University	Vocal, "Tapestry" & "I Will Never Pass This Way Again"			
1972	Freita Fuller	Opelika	19	Miss Lake Eufala	Hula & Tahitian Dance			
1971	Ceil Jenkins	Birmingham	21	Miss Northeast Alabama	Vocal / Dance, "But Alive" from Applause			
1970	Suzanne Dennie	Birmingham	20		Popular Vocal, "Alfie"		Preliminary Talent Award	
1969	Ann Fowler	Birmingham	21		Vocal, "Matchmaker, Matchmaker" from Fiddler on the Roof			Previously Alabama's Junior Miss 1966
1968	Dellynne Catching	Birmingham	19		Piano Medley, "Doctor Gradus Ad Parnassum," "America the Beautiful," & "This Is My Country"	Top 10	Preliminary Swimsuit Award	
1967	Becky Alford	Birmingham	20		Vocal, "Ain't This a Pretty Night" from Susannah			
1966	Angie Grooms	Birmingham	21		Folk Vocal & Guitar, "Today" & "If I Had a Hammer"	Top 10		
1965	Linda Folsom	New Brockton	20		Classical Vocal, "Caro Nome" from Rigoletto	Top 10	Preliminary Talent Award	
1964	Vickie Powers	Mobile	19		Classical Vocal, "Habanera"	Top 10	Preliminary Talent Award	Featured performer on the Miss America 1966 pageant
1963	Judy Short	Birmingham	18		Marimba, "Horst Toccata"	Top 10	Preliminary Swimsuit Award Preliminary Talent Award	Previously Alabama's Junior Miss 1962
1962	Patricia Bonner	Camden	22		Classical Vocal, "O Luce di Quest'Anima" from Linda di Chamounix		Non-finalist Talent Award	
1961	Patricia Ellisor							Assumed the title when Delores Hodgens resigned in November after competing in Miss America in September.
1961	Delores Hodgens	Bessemer	23		Classical Piano, "Hungarian Rhapsody No. 12"	Top 10		
1960	Teresa Rinaldi	Birmingham	20		Classical Vocal, "Addio" from La bohème	Top 10	Preliminary Talent Award	
1959	Betty Lindstrom	Birmingham	19		Dramatic Reading, "Miss Quiss"		Non-finalist Talent Award	
1958	Lee Thornberry	Birmingham			Vocal / Dance, "Honey Bun"' from South Pacific	Top 10	Preliminary Talent Award	
1957	Anna Stange	Birmingham			Monologue from Mourning Becomes Electra		Non-finalist Talent Award	
1956	Anne Stuart Ariail	Birmingham			Vocal / Dance, "Ado Annie" from Oklahoma	2nd runner-up	Preliminary Talent Award	
1955	Patricia Huddleston	Clanton	21		Classical Vocal, "Pace, Pace Mio Dio!" from La Forza del Destino	Top 10	Preliminary Talent Award	
1954	Marilyn Tate	Haleyville	21		Ventriloquism / Classical Piano	Top 10		
1953	Virginia McDavid	Birmingham	18		Monologue, "Tara"' from Gone With the Wind	3rd runner-up		Was married for a time to game show producer Mark Goodson.
1952	Gwen Harmon	Birmingham	19		Vocal, "A Heart That's Free"	3rd runner-up	Preliminary Swimsuit Award	
1951	Bettye Burson							Assumed title after Jeanne Moody resigned after competing at Miss America.
1951	Jeanne Moody	Cherokee	21		Dramatic Skit, "Sorry Wrong Number"	Top 10	Preliminary Talent Award	
1950	Yolande Betbeze	Mobile	21		Classical Vocal, "Caro Nome" from Rigoletto	Winner	Preliminary Swimsuit Award	Betbeze's refusal to pose in a swimsuit lead to the pull-out of swimsuit sponsors Catalina and ultimately the creation of the Miss USA pageant. The Miss Alabama title was not assigned to a runner-up after Yolande Betbeze won the title of Miss America.
1949	Freida Roser	Birmingham			Classical Vocal			
1948	Martha Ann Ingram	Tarrant			Classical Vocal, "Quando me'n vo'"	2nd runner-up		Multiple Alabama representatives Contestants competed under local title at Miss America pageant
1948	Marjorie Orr	Birmingham		Miss Birmingham				Multiple Alabama representatives Contestants competed under local title at Miss America pageant
1947	Peggy June Elder	Gadsden			Vocal, "I Wonder Who's Kissing Her Now"	3rd runner-up	Preliminary Swimsuit Award	Previously "Miss Dixie 1947" Peggy June Elder Butler died at age 93 on April 30, 2023, at home in Gadsden, Alabama.
1946	Dale Nunnally					Preliminary Talent Award	Multiple Alabama representatives Contestants competed under local title at Miss America pageant	
1946	Sue Donegan	Birmingham		Miss Birmingham			Multiple Alabama representatives Contestants competed under local title at Miss America pageant	
1945	Frances Dorn	Birmingham		Miss Birmingham	Tap Dance	2nd runner-up	Preliminary Talent Award	Competed under local title at Miss America pageant
1944	Betty Jane Rase	Birmingham		Miss Birmingham	Vocal Medley, "My Hero" from The Chocolate Soldier & "Lover, Come Back to Me"	4th runner-up	Preliminary Swimsuit Award Preliminary Talent Award	Competed under local title at Miss America pageant
1943	Toula Hagestratou	Birmingham		Miss Birmingham			Miss Congeniality	Competed under local title at Miss America pageant
1942	Marie Duncan	Birmingham		Miss Birmingham	Vocal, "I Met Him On Monday"	Top 10	Preliminary Swimsuit Award	Competed under local title at Miss America pageant
1941	Virginia McGraw	Birmingham		Miss Birmingham	Tap Dance with Rope Jumping	Top 15	Preliminary Talent Award	Competed under local title at Miss America pageant
1940	Evelyn Motlow	Birmingham		Miss Birmingham	Vocal			Multiple Alabama representatives Contestants competed under local title at Miss America pageant
1940	Carolyn Foreman	Montgomery		Miss Montgomery				Multiple Alabama representatives Contestants competed under local title at Miss America pageant
1939	Florine Holt	Birmingham		Miss Birmingham	Vocal, "Moonglow" & "A Little Bit of Heaven"	Top 15		Multiple Alabama representatives Contestants competed under local title at Miss America pageant
1939	Louise Robertson	Montgomery		Miss Montgomery				Multiple Alabama representatives Contestants competed under local title at Miss America pageant
1938	Mildred Oxford	Birmingham		Miss Birmingham	Tap Dance / Toe Ballet	Top 15		Multiple Alabama representatives Contestants competed under local title at Miss America pageant
1938	Patricia McDaniel	Montgomery		Miss Montgomery				Multiple Alabama representatives Contestants competed under local title at Miss America pageant
1937	Josephine Beall	Samson		Miss Birmingham				Multiple Alabama representatives Contestants competed under local title at Miss America pageant
1937	Ingram Starkey	Montgomery		Miss Montgomery				Multiple Alabama representatives Contestants competed under local title at Miss America pageant
1936	Tommy Marie Peck	Florence		Miss Alabama	Won a tri-state competition held in Tupelo, Mississippi, and was awarded the title of "Miss Alabama"	Top 15		Multiple Alabama representatives Contestants competed under local title at Miss America pageant
1936	Gloria Levinge	Birmingham		Miss Birmingham	Tap Dance	4th runner-up	Preliminary Talent Award	Multiple Alabama representatives Contestants competed under local title at Miss America pageant
1935	Adelynn Owen	Birmingham	23	Miss Birmingham	Recited 2 poems and sang a song in French and English			Competed under local title at Miss America pageant
1934	No national pageant was held							
1933	No Alabama representative at Miss America pageant							
1932	No national pageants were held							
1931	No national pageants were held							
1930	No national pageants were held							
1929	No national pageants were held							
1928	No national pageants were held							
1927	No Alabama representative at Miss America pageant							
1926	Vivian McDowell			Miss Mobile	N/A			Competed under local title at national pageant
1925	Nellie Kincaid	Birmingham		Miss Birmingham	N/A			Competed under local title at national pageant
1924	Mildred Adams	Birmingham		Miss Birmingham	N/A			Competed under local title at national pageant
1923	Louise Newman	Birmingham		Miss Birmingham	N/A			Competed under local title at national pageant
1922	Elise Sparrow	Birmingham	24	Miss Birmingham	N/A			Competed under local title at national pageant Married Boston Red Sox owner, Tom Yawkey, in 1925 and later divorced in 1944
1921	Lois Wilson			Miss Birmingham	N/A	N/A		Competed under local title at national pageant
