= Miss America's Outstanding Teen 2009 =

4th edition of Miss America's Outstanding Teen pageant

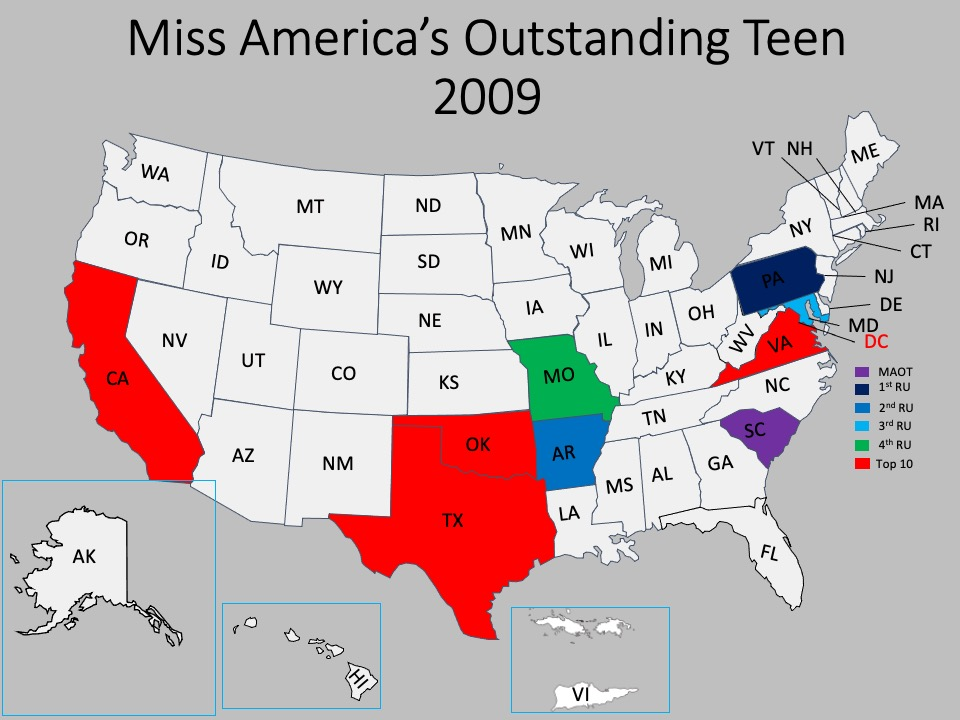
- Miss America's Outstanding Teen 2009 Participants and Results
- Date: August 16, 2008
- Presenters: Billy Flanigan; Kirsten Haglund
- Entertainment: Billy Flanigan
- Venue: Linda Chapin Theater, Orlando, Florida, United States
- Entrants: 52
- Placements: 10
- Winner: Taylor Hanna Fitch; South Carolina

Miss America's Outstanding Teen 2009 was the fourth Miss America's Outstanding Teen pageant, held at the Linda Chapin Theater in the Orange County Convention Center in Orlando, Florida, United States, on August 16, 2008.

Caitlin Brunell of Virginia crowned Taylor Hanna Fitch of South Carolina as her successor at the end of the event.

== Results ==
=== Placements ===
Placement	Contestant
Miss America's Outstanding Teen 2009	South Carolina – Taylor Hanna Fitch
1st Runner-Up	Pennsylvania – Julia Rae Schlucter
2nd Runner-Up	Arkansas – Sloane Roberts
3rd Runner-Up	Maryland – Joanna Guy
4th Runner-Up	Missouri – Sydnee Stottlemyre
Top 10	California – Crystal Lee; District of Columbia – Jasmine Alexis; Oklahoma – Alicia Clifton; Texas – Sydney Capello; Virginia – Lexie Overholt

=== Other Awards ===
Award	Contestant(s)
Community Service	West Virginia - Bethany Lojewski
Non-finalist Evening Wear/OSQ	North Dakota - Arianna Walker
Non-finalist Interview	North Dakota - Arianna Walker
Non-finalist Talent	Alabama - Haley Ates
Outstanding Achievement in Academic Life	Maryland - Joanna Guy
Preliminary Evening Wear/OSQ	Arkansas - Sloane Roberts; North Dakota - Arianna Walker; Texas - Sydney Capello
Preliminary Lifestyle and Fitness	California - Crystal Lee; Maryland - Joanna Guy; Missouri - Sydnee Stottlemyer; Utah - McKenna Lewis
Preliminary Talent	Arkansas - Sloane Roberts; Oklahoma - Alicia Clifton; Texas - Sydney Capello
Scholastic Excellence	South Carolina - Taylor Hanna Fitch
Spirit of America	Pennsylvania - Julia Rae Schlucter

== Order of Announcement ==
=== Top 10 ===
1. California
2. Pennsylvania
3. Arkansas
4. Missouri
5. South Carolina
6. District of Columbia
7. Texas
8. Oklahoma
9. Maryland
10. Virginia

=== Top 5 ===
1. Pennsylvania
2. Arkansas
3. Missouri
4. South Carolina
5. Maryland

== Pageant ==
=== Selection of Contestants ===
One delegate from each state, District of Columbia, and the Virgin Islands were chosen in state pageants between September 2007- July 2008

=== Preliminaries ===
During the 3 days prior to the final night, the delegates compete in the preliminary competition, which include a private interview with the judges and a show where they compete in lifestyle and fitness in athletic wear, evening wear, talent, and on-stage question. They were held on August 13–15, 2008.

=== Finals ===
During the finals, the top 10 compete in lifestyle and fitness in athletic wear, talent, and evening wear, and the top 5 compete in on-stage question.

== Contestants ==
52 delegates participated:

State	Name	Hometown	Age	Local Title	Talent	Placement	Awards	Notes
Alabama	Haley Ates	Eufaula		Miss Teen Painted Rock	Vocal, "Defying Gravity" from Wicked		Non-finalist Talent Award	
Alaska	Sierra Slade	Eagle River	15	Miss Teen Birchwood	Dramatic Reading			
Arizona	Kelsey Hartley	Cave Creek	16	Miss Teen Twirling Athlete	Baton Twirling			
Arkansas	Sloane Roberts	Rison	15	Miss Teen White River		2nd runner-up	Preliminary Evening Wear/OSQ Award Preliminary Talent Award	Later Miss Arkansas 2012
California	Crystal Lee	San Francisco	17	Miss Teen San Francisco	Ballet en Pointe	Top 10	Preliminary Lifestyle and Fitness Award	Later Miss California 2013; 1st runner-up at Miss America 2014
Colorado	Caley-Rae Pavillard	Castle Rock	14					Later Miss Colorado Teen USA 2011; Top 15 at Miss Teen USA 2011 Later Miss Colorado USA 2016
Connecticut	Rachel Ramonas	Wolcott	16	Miss Wolcott's Outstanding Teen				Banned from competing in pageants in the Miss Connecticut Organization
Delaware	Amanda Debus	Middletown	15	Miss Jr Teen New Castle County	Baton/Dance			Later Miss Delaware Teen USA 2011 Later Miss Delaware 2016
(Washington, D.C.) District of Columbia	Jasmine Alexis	Washington D.C.	17			Top 10		Previously Miss District of Columbia Teen USA 2007 The first Miss Black USA Talented Teen 2009
Florida	Courtney Sexton	Starke	15	Miss St. Augustine's Outstanding Teen	Dance			Later Miss Florida 2016
(Georgia (U.S. state)) Georgia	Hilary Pulos	Jesup	13	Miss Satilla's Outstanding Teen	Dance "It's a Spy Thing"			
Hawaii	Halialani Parish	Ewa Beach	15					
Idaho	Danielle Beckstrom	Eagle	17	At-Large				
Illinois	Emily Travis	Metropolis	17	Miss Metropolis' Outstanding Teen	Piano			Addicted to alcohol and cocaine at birth; now suffers from Fetal Alcohol Spectrum Disorder
Indiana	Megan Thwaites	Garrett	16	Miss Three Rivers Festival's Outstanding Teen	Dance			
Iowa	Jessica Jennings	McCausland	15	Miss Scott County's Outstanding Teen				
Kansas	Alasyn Zimmerman	Derby	14	Miss Sunflower's Outstanding Teen	Dance, "So Much Better" from Legally Blonde			
Kentucky	Ashley Ferry	Louisville	17	Miss Thoroughbred's Outstanding Teen	Jazz			
Louisiana	April Nelson	Mandeville	16	Miss Pineville's Outstanding Teen	Vocal			Later Miss Louisiana 2015; 3rd runner-up at Miss America 2016 pageant
Maine	Shannon Folsom	Saco	17					Older sister of Alison Folsom, Miss Maine's Outstanding Teen 2011 Later Miss Collegiate America 2011
Maryland	Joanna Guy	Swanton	16	Miss College Park's Outstanding Teen		3rd runner-up	Outstanding Achievement in Academic Life Award Preliminary Lifestyle and Fitness Award	Later Miss Maryland 2012; Top 10 at Miss America 2013 pageant
Massachusetts	Taylor Kinzler	Lakeville	16		Vocal			Contestant at National Sweetheart 2010 pageant Later Miss Massachusetts 2012
Michigan	Carleigh Corrion- Rowley	Essexville	14	Miss Oakland County's Outstanding Teen				
Minnesota	Alyssa Mayfield	Frazee	16	Miss Frazee Teen				
Mississippi	Morgan Lindsey Burnett	Brandon	17	Miss New South's Outstanding Teen				
Missouri	Sydnee Stottlemyre	Wildwood	14	Miss Gateway St. Louis' Outstanding Teen		4th runner-up	Preliminary Lifestyle and Fitness Award	Later Miss Missouri Teen USA 2011; 4th runner-up at Miss Teen USA 2011 pageant Later Miss Missouri USA 2016; Top 10 at Miss USA 2016 pageant
Montana	Victoria Valentine	Missoula						Later Miss Montana 2014
Nebraska	Rachel Foehlinger	Ralston		Miss Omaha's Outstanding Teen	Baton Twirling			Sister of Christina Foehlinger, Miss Nebraska 2001 1st runner-up at Miss Nebraska 2013 pageant 2nd runner-up at Miss Nebraska 2012 pageant and 2014 Contestant at National Sweetheart 2014 pageant
Nevada	Alexis Hilts	Las Vegas						
New Hampshire	Megan Lyman	Gilford	17		Tap Dance, "Baby I'm a Star" by Prince			Contestant at National Sweetheart 2010 pageant Later Miss New Hampshire 2012
New Jersey	Katharyn Nicolle	Wenonah	16		Ballet en Pointe			Later Miss New Jersey 2011
New Mexico	Alyssa Jean Sifuentes	Silver City						
(New York (state)) New York	Alexandra Mazzucchelli	Staten Island	16	Miss Staten Island's Outstanding Teen				
North Carolina	Mya Hipps	Gastonia	17	Miss Gastonia's Outstanding Teen				
North Dakota	Ariana Walker	Bismarck		Miss Bismarck's Outstanding Teen	Contemporary Lyrical Dance		Non-finalist Evening Wear/OSQ Award Non-finalist Interview Award Preliminary Evening Wear/OSQ Award	Later Miss North Dakota Teen USA 2010 Later Miss North Dakota 2011
Ohio	Sarah Hider	Wooster	17	Miss Lake Erie's Outstanding Teen				Later Miss Ohio 2015
Oklahoma	Alicia Clifton	Oklahoma City	16	Miss Tulsa's Outstanding Teen		Top 10	Preliminary Talent Award	Later Miss Oklahoma 2012; 2nd runner-up at Miss America 2013 pageant
Oregon	JoAnna Adkisson	Klamath Falls	17	Miss Klamath County's Outstanding Teen				
Pennsylvania	Julia Rae Schlucter	Malvern	16	At-Large		1st runner-up	Spirit of America Award	1st runner-up at Miss Pennsylvania 2015 pageant
Rhode Island	Angela Angers	Barrington						
South Carolina	Taylor Hanna Fitch	Anderson	17	Miss Upstate Teen		Winner	Scholastic Excellence Award	
South Dakota	Carrie Wintel	Iroquois	14					
Tennessee	Madyson Foster	Cleveland	16	Miss Scenic City's Outstanding Teen	Dance			
Texas	Sydney Capello	Southlake	15	Miss Teen Duncanville	Pop Vocal, "Midnight Train to Georgia"	Top 10	Preliminary Evening Wear/OSQ Award Preliminary Talent Award	
Utah	McKenna Lewis	Smithfield					Preliminary Lifestyle and Fitness Award	
Vermont	Blaize Hall	Georgia	15					
Virginia	Lexie Overholt	Oakton			Ballet en Pointe	Top 10		Member of corps de ballet at Miami City Ballet
(United States Virgin Islands) Virgin Islands	Brittany Rodriguez	Saint Thomas						
(Washington (state)) Washington	Tori Knight	Puyallup	16	Miss Pierce County's Outstanding Teen	Vocal			
West Virginia	Bethany Lojewski	Morgantown	15	Miss Teen Randolph County			Community Service Award	Type 1 Diabetic 3rd runner-up at Miss West Virginia 2016 pageant
Wisconsin	Jennifer Dombrowski	Milwaukee	17	Miss Milwaukee's Outstanding Teen				
Wyoming	Marcella Bledsoe	Sheridan	13	Miss Sheridan's Outstanding Teen				
