= Miss Maryland's Teen =

Beauty pageant

- Formation: 1998
- Type: Beauty pageant
- Location: Hagerstown, MD
- Members: Miss America's Teen
- Official language: English
- Website: Official website

For the state pageant affiliated with Miss Teen USA, see Miss Maryland Teen USA

The Miss Maryland's Teen competition, formerly Miss Maryland's Outstanding Teen, is the pageant that selects the representative for the U.S. state of Maryland in the Miss America's Teen pageant.

Aryani Odie of Pikesville, was crowned Miss Maryland's Teen on June 27, 2026, at the Maryland Theater in Hagerstown, Maryland. She competed for the title of Miss America's Teen 2027 on September 5, 2026, at the Kravis Center for the Performing Arts in West Palm Beach, Florida.

In January 2023, the official name of the pageant was changed from Miss Maryland's Outstanding Teen, to Miss Maryland’s Teen, in accordance with the national pageant.

== Results summary ==
The results of Miss Maryland's Outstanding Teen as they participated in the national Miss America's Outstanding Teen competition. The year in parentheses indicates the year of the Miss America's Outstanding Teen competition the award/placement was garnered.

=== Placements ===
- 1st runners-up: Kate Wills (2022)
- 2nd runners-up: Chloe Wildman (2018)
- 3rd runners-up: Joanna Guy (2009)
- Top 10: Kennedy Taylor (2013)

=== Awards ===
==== Preliminary awards ====
- Preliminary Evening Gown: Zoe Zuzak (2024)
- Preliminary Lifestyle & Fitness: Joanna Guy (2009)

==== Other awards ====
- America's Choice: Kate Wills (2022)
- Outstanding Achievement in Academic Life: Joanna Guy (2009), Chloe Wildman (2018)
- Spirit of America Award: Kate Wills (2022)
- Teens in Action Award Winners: Sabrina Frost (2014)
- Teens in Action Award Finalists: Chloe Wildman (2018), Aryani Odie (2027)

== Winners ==
- Declared as winner
- Ended as a runner-up
- Ended as a finalist or semi-finalist

Year	Name	Hometown	Age	Local title	Talent	CSI	Placement at MAO Teen	Special scholarships at MAO Teen	Notes
2026	Aryani Odie	Pikesville	16	Miss Central Maryland's Teen	Classical and Bollywood Fusion Dance	The Delia Project		Teens in Action Award Finalist	
2025	Kinsley Potts	Pikesville	16	Miss Central Maryland's Teen	Vocal, "Rise Up"	Fire For Change			
2024	Zoe Zuzak	Frostburg	17	Miss Allegany County's Teen	Jazz Dance	Sparkling Science		Preliminary Evening Gown Winner	Later Miss Maryland Teen USA 2025
2023	Rachel Spencer	Adamstown	16	Miss Carroll County's Teen	Piano	Sprinkles of Love			
2022	Ryleigh Jackson	Germantown	16	Miss Germantown's Outstanding Teen	Tap Dance	Teen Anxiety Pals			
2021	Kate Wills	Frederick	17	Miss Urbana's Outstanding Teen	Jazz Dance, "Big Time"		1st runner-up	America's Choice Spirit of America Award	4th Runner Up at Miss Maryland 2023
2020	National pageant cancelled due to the coronavirus pandemic								
2019	Emily Yi	Frederick	17	Miss Western Maryland's Outstanding Teen	Jazz Dance, "Show Off" from The Drowsy Chaperone				Fulfilled her year of service and chose not to extend it for a second year because of the pandemic.
2018	Katie Allen	Easton	16	Miss Baltimore's Outstanding Teen	Ballet en Pointe, "Spanish Rose"				
2017	Chloe Wildman	Lonaconing	16	Miss Frostburg's Outstanding Teen	Vocal		2nd runner-up	Outstanding Achievement in Academic Life Award	
2016	Allison LaForce	Damascus	17	Miss Mountain City's Outstanding Teen	Lyrical Jazz Dance				Later Miss District of Columbia USA 2025. Contestant on Season 2 of Squid Game: The Challenge.
2015	Jessica Bayuk	Frederick	17	Miss Western Maryland's Outstanding Teen	Contemporary Dance				Third Runner Up at Miss Maryland 2022.
2014	Sarah Robinson	Ijamsville	15	Miss Northern Maryland's Outstanding Teen	Vocal				3rd runner-up at Miss Maryland Teen USA 2016 pageant 3rd runner-up at Miss Maryland 2017 pageant 3rd runner-up at Miss Virginia 2018 pageant 1st Runner Up at Miss Virginia 2021 Pageant. 4th Runner Up at Miss Virginia 2022 Pageant.
2013	Sabrina Frost	Frostburg	15	Miss Queen State's Outstanding Teen	Dance			Teens in Action Award	
2012	Kennedy Taylor	Silver Spring	15	Miss University City's Outstanding Teen	Dance		Top 10		Later Miss Maryland 2023, Top 11 at Miss America 2024
2011	Ally Soule	Frederick	15	Miss Frederick's Outstanding Teen	Ballet				
2010	Mary Teal Mulligan	Williamsport	16	Miss Hagerstown's Outstanding Teen	Tap Dance				2nd runner-up at Miss Maryland 2016 pageant
2009	Stephanie Meadowcroft	Bel Air		Miss Greater Baltimore's Outstanding Teen	Vocal				4th runner-up at Miss Maryland 2012 pageant 3rd runner-up at Miss Maryland 2013 and 2014 pageants
2008	Joanna Guy	Swanton	16	Miss College Park's Outstanding Teen	Vocal		3rd runner-up	Outstanding Achievement in Academic Life Award Preliminary Lifestyle & Fitness Award	Later Miss Maryland 2012; Top 10 at Miss America 2013 pageant
2007	Kasey Staniszewski	Swan Point	15	Miss College Park's Outstanding Teen	Vocal				Sister of Miss Maryland 2010, Lindsay Staniszewski Triple Crown Winner: 3rd runner-up at Miss Teen USA 2009 pageant; Later Miss Maryland USA 2013; Top 15 at Miss USA 2013 pageant
2006	Hannah Mollerick	Jessup		Miss Howard County's Outstanding Teen	Jazz en Pointe				Contestant at National Sweetheart 2010 pageant 4th runner-up at Miss Maryland 2010, 2011, and 2013 pageantsTop 10 at Miss Maryland 2012
2005	Lindsay Morris	Church Creek	15	Miss Caroline Summerfest's Outstanding Teen	Classical Piano				
2004	Brittany Eberly		15		Dance		No national pageant Was previously an independent pageant with the winner earning the title of, "Miss Teen Maryland" Changed to current title after a national pageant was created by the Miss America Organization in 2005		
2003	Cynthia English	West Laurel	15	Miss College Park Teen	Tap Dance		No national pageant Was previously an independent pageant with the winner earning the title of, "Miss Teen Maryland" Changed to current title after a national pageant was created by the Miss America Organization in 2005		
2002	Tierra Wharton						No national pageant Was previously an independent pageant with the winner earning the title of, "Miss Teen Maryland" Changed to current title after a national pageant was created by the Miss America Organization in 2005		
2001	Heather Molnar	Parsonsburg	14		Vocal		No national pageant Was previously an independent pageant with the winner earning the title of, "Miss Teen Maryland" Changed to current title after a national pageant was created by the Miss America Organization in 2005		4th runner-up at Miss Maryland 2004 pageant 1st runner-up at Miss Maryland 2008 pageant
2000	Danielle McGarvey	Hagerstown			Dance		No national pageant Was previously an independent pageant with the winner earning the title of, "Miss Teen Maryland" Changed to current title after a national pageant was created by the Miss America Organization in 2005		Former NFL cheerleader for the Seattle Seahawks
1999	Kelli Lobaugh						No national pageant Was previously an independent pageant with the winner earning the title of, "Miss Teen Maryland" Changed to current title after a national pageant was created by the Miss America Organization in 2005		
1998	Amanda Daugherty						No national pageant Was previously an independent pageant with the winner earning the title of, "Miss Teen Maryland" Changed to current title after a national pageant was created by the Miss America Organization in 2005		
