= Swarm of the Snakehead =

- Directed by: Frank A. Lama; Joel C. Denning
- Written by: Seth Hurwitz
- Produced by: Seth Hurwitz; Frank A. Lama
- Starring: Gunnar Hansen; Frank A. Lama; Jamie O'Brien; Rigg Kennedy; Lisa Burdette; Timothy Stutlz Gilliss; Maggie Denning; Elizabeth Denning; Sharon Graves; Gerry Paradiso; Barry A. Hurwitz; Brandon Mason; Oksana Mazurovsky; Leanna Chamish
- Music by: Tom Alonso
- Release date: 2006
- Running time: 98 minutes
- Country: United States
- Language: English

Swarm of the Snakehead is a 2006 comedy/horror feature film directed by Frank A. Lama and Joel C. Denning and written by Seth Hurwitz. It is the first feature from producers Lama and Hurwitz's Baltimore-based production company Ten Pound Films.

The ensemble cast includes Rigg Kennedy (Slumber Party Massacre), Miss Maryland Teen USA 2006 Jamie O'Brien, and a cameo from Gunnar Hansen (The Texas Chain Saw Massacre).

Swarm of the Snakehead was shot on 16 mm film in and around Easton, Maryland between 2002 and 2005. Post-production was completed during the summer of 2006. The film premiered at The Charles Theatre in Baltimore on June 21, 2006. Following the screening, the Baltimore CBS affiliate WJZ-TV, anchor and longtime Maryland personality Marty Bass called Swarm of the Snakehead "lots of fun" and "John Waters-esque."

While making Swarm of the Snakehead, Lama starred in Fear of Clowns released by Lions Gate Entertainment in 2005 and Fear of Clowns 2, which he also produced. At the same time, Hurwitz edited Swarm and shepherded the film through post-production, working closely with sound designer Kevin Hill and composer Tom Alonso.

== Cast ==
- Jamie O'Brien as Ashley Emerson
- Lisa Burdette as Mayor Janice Appleyard
- Maggie Denning as Margarita
- Timothy Stultz Gilliss as Jake Appleyard
- Johnny Alonso as Buddy Brown
- Gerry Paradiso as Jimmy
- Gunnar Hansen as Gunner
- Joel C. Denning as William Emerson
- Sharon Graves as Abigail Parker
- Rigg Kennedy as Dr. Emerson
- Frank Lama as Darrel Delhey
- Kim Mallory as Sandy Redhook
- Steve Carson as 'Meathead'
- Leanna Chamish as Briana Devine
- Lizzy Denning as Samantha
- Bruce Geisert as Brown Johnson
- Erica Highberg as Mimi Mansfield
- Barry A. Hurwitz as Barry, The Diver
- Brandon Mason as Deputy Ricky
- The Mayo as 'Apocalypstick'
- George Stover as The Frenchman

== Premise ==
A dysfunctional family vacations on the Maryland shore during a deadly attack of intelligent snakehead fish.

== Soundtrack and music score ==
The original score was composed and conducted by Tom Alonso and features players from the Baltimore Symphony Orchestra. Bands contributing songs to the soundtrack include Kip Winger, Ravyns, Bootcamp, Glen Nevous, Tony Sciuto of Little River Band, The Big Sky, and Dagmar and the Seductones.
