= List of horror films of 2002 =

A list of horror films released in 2002.

Horror films released in 2002
Title	Director	Cast	Country	Notes
28 Days Later	Danny Boyle	Cillian Murphy, Naomie Harris, Brendan Gleeson	United Kingdom	
Blade II	Guillermo del Toro	Wesley Snipes, Kris Kristofferson, Ron Perlman	United States	
Blood Feast 2: All U Can Eat	Herschell Gordon Lewis	J. P. Delahoussaye, Mark McLachlan, John "Spud" McConnell	United States	
Blood Gnome	John Lechago	Vinnie Bilancio, Melissa Pursley, Scott Evangelista	United States	
Bloody Mallory	Julien Magnat	Olivia Bonamy, Adrià Collado, Jeffrey Ribier	France	Action horror
The Brotherhood III: Young Demons	David DeCoteau	Kristopher Turner, Andrew Hrankowski, Ellen Wieser	Canada; United States	
Bubba Ho-Tep	Don Coscarelli	Bruce Campbell, Ossie Davis, Ella Joyce	United States	Horror comedy
Cabin Fever	Eli Roth	Jordan Ladd, James DeBello, Cerina Vincent	United States	
Carrie	David Carson	Angela Bettis, Steve Byers, Patricia Clarkson	United States	
Close Your Eyes	Nick Willing	Angela Bettis, Shirley Henderson, Miranda Otto	United States	
Cube 2: Hypercube	Andrzej Sekuła	Kari Matchett, Geraint Wyn Davies, Grace Lynn Kung	Canada	
Dark Water	Hideo Nakata	Hitomi Kuroki, Rio Kanno, Mirei Oguchi	Japan	
Darkness	Jaume Balagueró	Anna Paquin, Lena Olin, Iain Glen	Spain	
Dead Above Ground	Chuck Bowman	Lisa Ann Hadley, Keri Lynn Pratt, Charlie Weber	United States	
Dead and Rotting	David P. Barton	Trent Haaga, Tammi Sutton, Debbie Rochon	United States	
Death Factory	Brad Sykes	Lisa Jay, Jeff Ryan, Karla Zamundio	United States	
Deathbed	Danny Draven	Tanya Dempsey, Brave Matthews, Meagan Mangum	United States	
Deathwatch	Michael J. Bassett	Jamie Bell, Ruaidhri Conroy, Laurence Fox	Germany; United Kingdom	
Descendant	Kermit Christman	Katherine Heigl, Arie Verveen	United States	
Dog Soldiers	Neil Marshall	Sean Pertwee, Kevin McKidd, Emma Cleasby	United Kingdom; Luxembourg	
Dolla Morte	Bill Zebub	J.T. Petty, Katja Methfessel, Rocco Martone	United States	Horror comedy
Dracula, Pages From a Virgin's Diary	Guy Maddin	Zhang Wei-Qiang, Tara Birtwhistle, David Moroni	Canada	
Eight Legged Freaks	Ellory Elkayem	David Arquette, Kari Wuhrer, Scott Terra	United States	
The Eye	Danny Pang, Oxide Pang Chun	Angelica Lee, Lawrence Chou, Chutcha Rujinanon	Hong Kong; Singapore	
Fear of the Dark	K.C. Bascombe	Jesse James, Kevin Zegers, Rachel Skarsten	Canada	
FeardotCom	William Malone	Stephen Dorff, Natascha McElhone, Stephen Rea	United States	
The Fiancee of Dracula	Jean Rollin	Brigitte Lahaie, Sandrine Thoquet, Jacques Regis	France	
Ghost Ship	Steve Beck	Gabriel Byrne, Julianna Margulies, Karl Urban	United States	
Halloween: Resurrection	Rick Rosenthal	Jamie Lee Curtis, Katee Sackhoff, Busta Rhymes	United States	Horror comedy
Hell Asylum	Danny Draven	Debra Mayer, Sunny Lombardo, Stacey Scowley, Tanya Dempsey, Sonny Lombardo, Joe Estevez	United States	Horror
Hellraiser: Hellseeker	Rick Bota	Ashley Laurence, Dean Winters, William S. Taylor, Michael Rogers, Rachel Hayward, Doug Bradley	Canada; United States	
Hunting Humans	Kevin Kangas	Rick Ganz, Bubby Lewis, Jeff Kipers	United States	
Ju-on: The Grudge	Takashi Shimizu	Megumi Okina, Misaki Ito, Misa Uehara	Japan	
Killer Barbys vs. Dracula	Jesus Franco	Bela B., Dan van Husen, Carsten Frank	Spain; Germany	
Killer Bees	Scott Leberecht	C. Thomas Howell, Fiona Loewi, Emily Tennant	United States	
Killjoy 2: Deliverance from Evil	Tammi Sutton	Choice Skinner, Trent Haaga, Debbie Rochon	United States	
Long Time Dead	Marcus Adams	Joe Absolom, Lara Belmont, Melanie Gutteridge	United Kingdom	
Make a Wish	Sharon Ferranti	Moynan King, Hollace Starr, Virginia Baeta	United States	
Maléfique	Eric Valette	Gérald Laroche, Philippe Laudenbach, Clovis Cornillac	France	
May	Lucky McKee	Angela Bettis, Jeremy Sisto, Anna Faris	United States	
Mutation 3 – Century of the Dead	Timo Rose	Anja Gebel, Ricky Goldberg, Yvette Moreaux	Germany	
My Little Eye	Marc Evans	Sean CW Johnson, Kris Lemche, Jennifer Sky	United States; United Kingdom; France	
Nine Lives	Andrew Green	Paris Hilton, Tarri Markel, David Nicolle	United States	
Phone	Ahn Byeong-ju	Ha Ji-weon, Kim Yu-mi, Choi Woo-jae	South Korea	
Project Viper	Jay Andrews	Tamara Davies, Adam Lieberman, Steve J. Hennessy	United States	Science fiction horror
Python II	Lee McConnell	William Zabka, Alex Jolig, Dana Ashbrook	United States	
Queen of the Damned	Paul Goldman, Michael Rymer	Aaliyah, Stuart Townsend, Vincent Perez	United States; Australia	
Raaz	Vikram Bhatt	Dino Morea, Bipasha Basu, Ashutosh Rana	India	
Resident Evil	Paul W. S. Anderson	Milla Jovovich, Michelle Rodriguez, Indra Ové	United States	
The Ring	Gore Verbinski	Naomi Watts, Martin Henderson, David Dorfman	United States	
Rose Red	Craig R. Baxley	Nancy Travis, Matt Keeslar, Kimberly J. Brown	United States	
Scarecrow	Emmanuel Itier	Tiffany Shepis, Roxanna Bina, Jen Richey	United States	
Shark Attack 3: Megalodon	David Worth	John Barrowman, Jenny McShane, Ryan Cutrona	United States	
Slash	Neal Sundstrom	Steve Railsback, Craig Kirkwood, Danny Keogh	South Africa	
T.T. Syndrome	Dejan Zečević	Sonja Damjanović, Nikola Đuričko, Bane Vidaković	Serbia	
They	Robert Harmon	Laura Regan, Marc Blucas, Ethan Embry	United States	
Three	Kim Ji-Woon, Nonzee Nimibutr, Peter Chan	Kim Hye-soo, Jeong Bo-seok, Moon Jeong-hee	South Korea; Thailand; Hong Kong	
Tsui Hark's Vampire Hunters	Wellson Chin	Ken Chang, Michael Chow Man-kin, Lam Suet	Hong Kong; Japan; Netherlands	
Wishcraft	Danny Graves, Richard Wenk	Alexandra Holden, Michael Weston	United States	
Wishmaster: The Prophecy Fulfilled	Chris Angel	John Novak, Tara Spencer-Nairn	United States	
Witchcraft XII: In the Lair of the Serpent	Brad Sykes		United States	
Wolfhound	Donovan Kelly	Julie Lynn Cialini, Allen Scotti	United States	
Wolves of Wall Street	David DeCoteau	Charity Rahmer, Stephen Sowan, Maya Parrish	United States	
