= Miss Maryland =

Beauty pageant competition

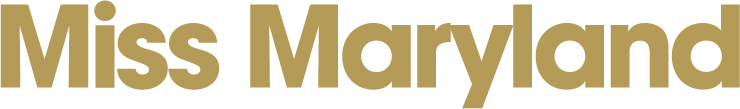
- Formation: 1921
- Type: Beauty pageant
- Location: Hagerstown, Maryland
- Members: Miss America
- Official language: English
- Website: Official website

The Miss Maryland competition is the pageant that selects the representative for the U.S. state of Maryland in the Miss America pageant.

Gianna Romero of Joppatowne was crowned Miss Maryland 2026 in June 2026 at Maryland Theatre in Hagerstown, Maryland. She competed for the title of Miss America 2027 on September 6, 2026, at the Kravis Center for the Performing Arts in West Palm Beach, Florida.

== Past titleholders ==
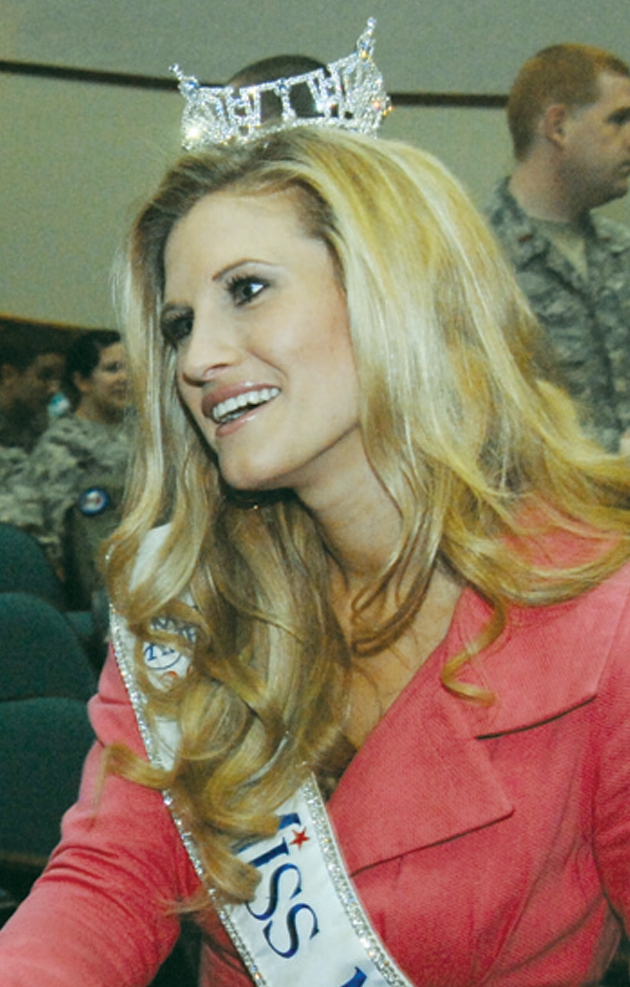
Brooke Poklemba
Miss Maryland 2009

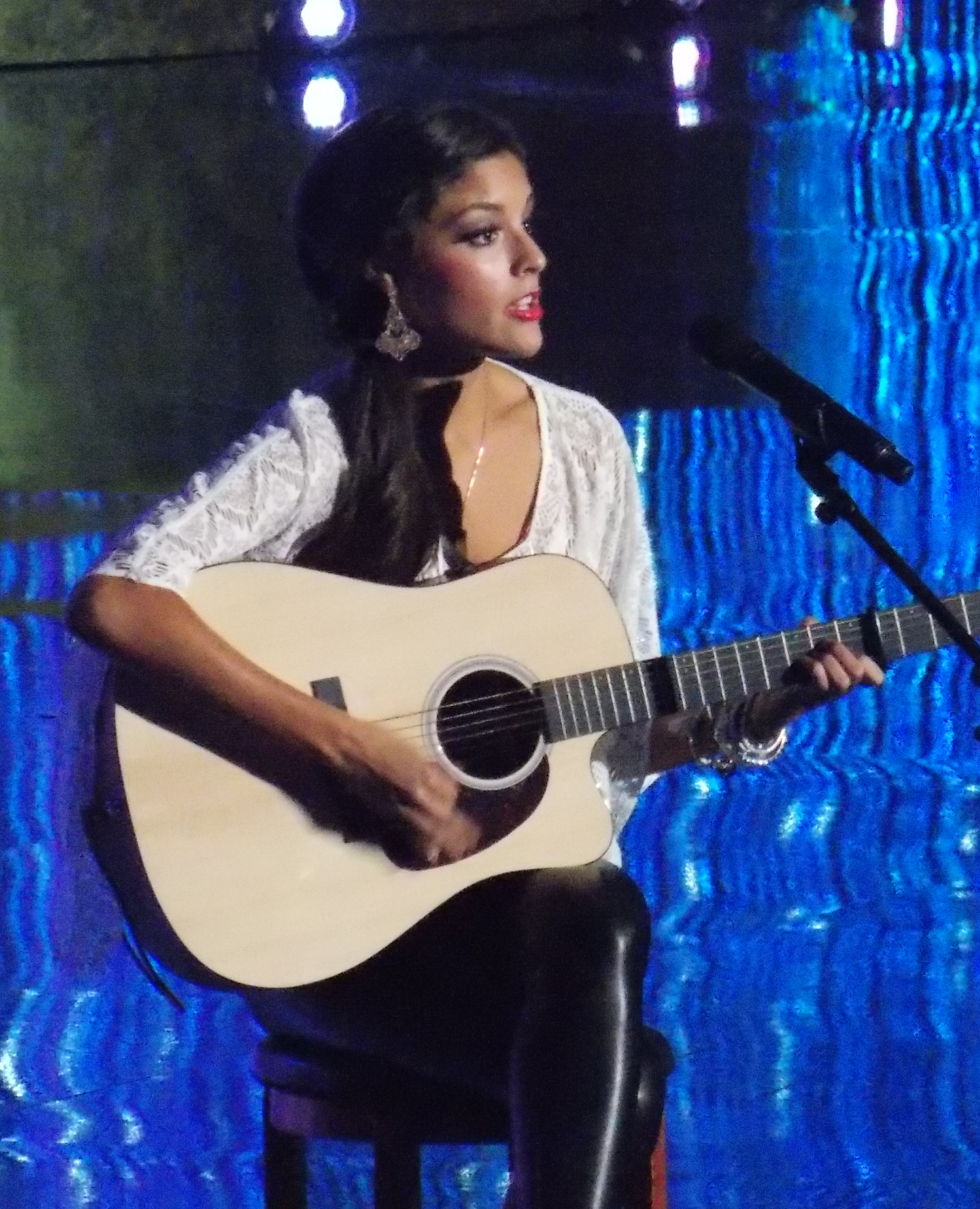
Destiny Clark
Miss Maryland 2015

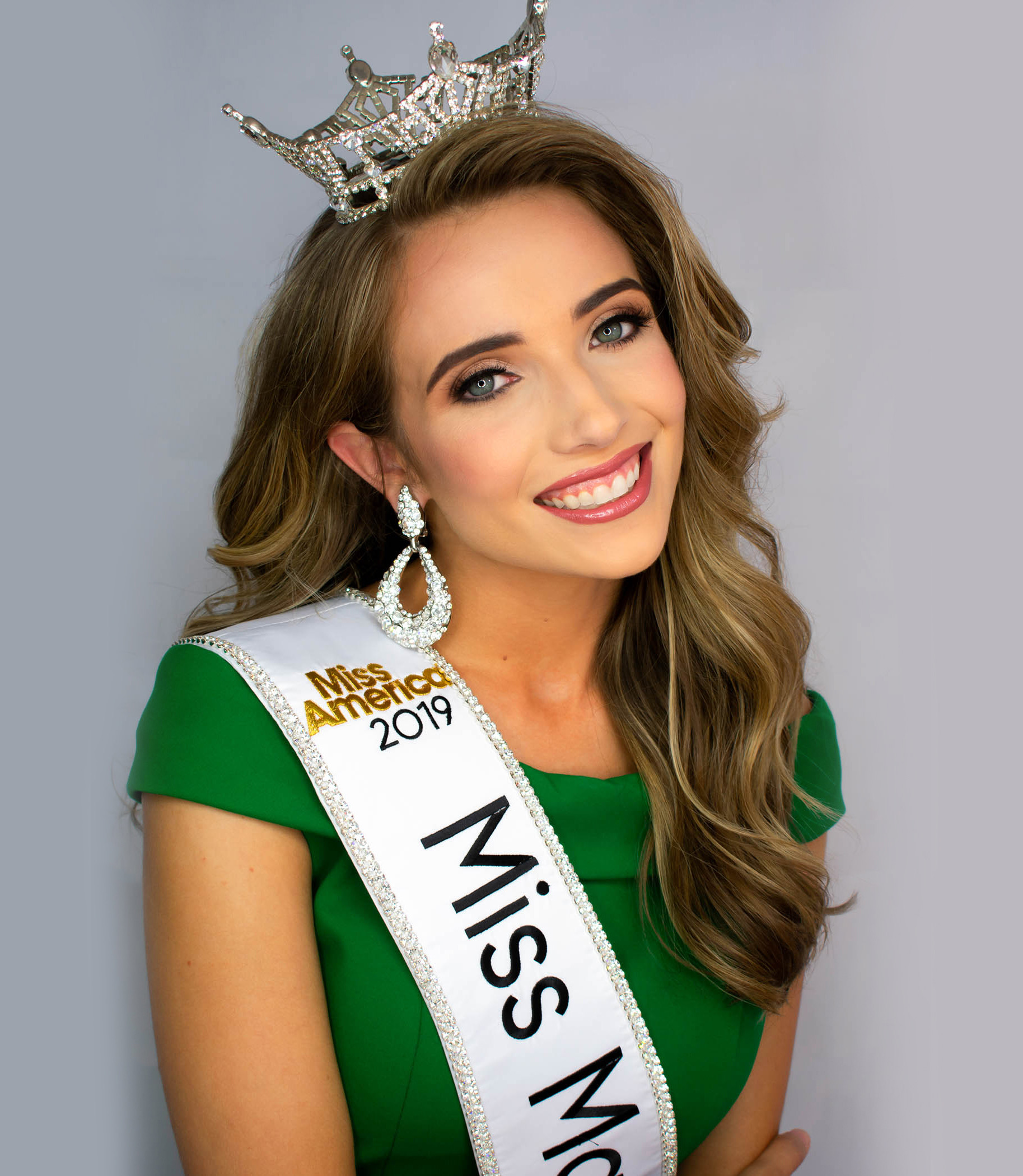
Caitlyn Stupi
Miss Maryland 2019

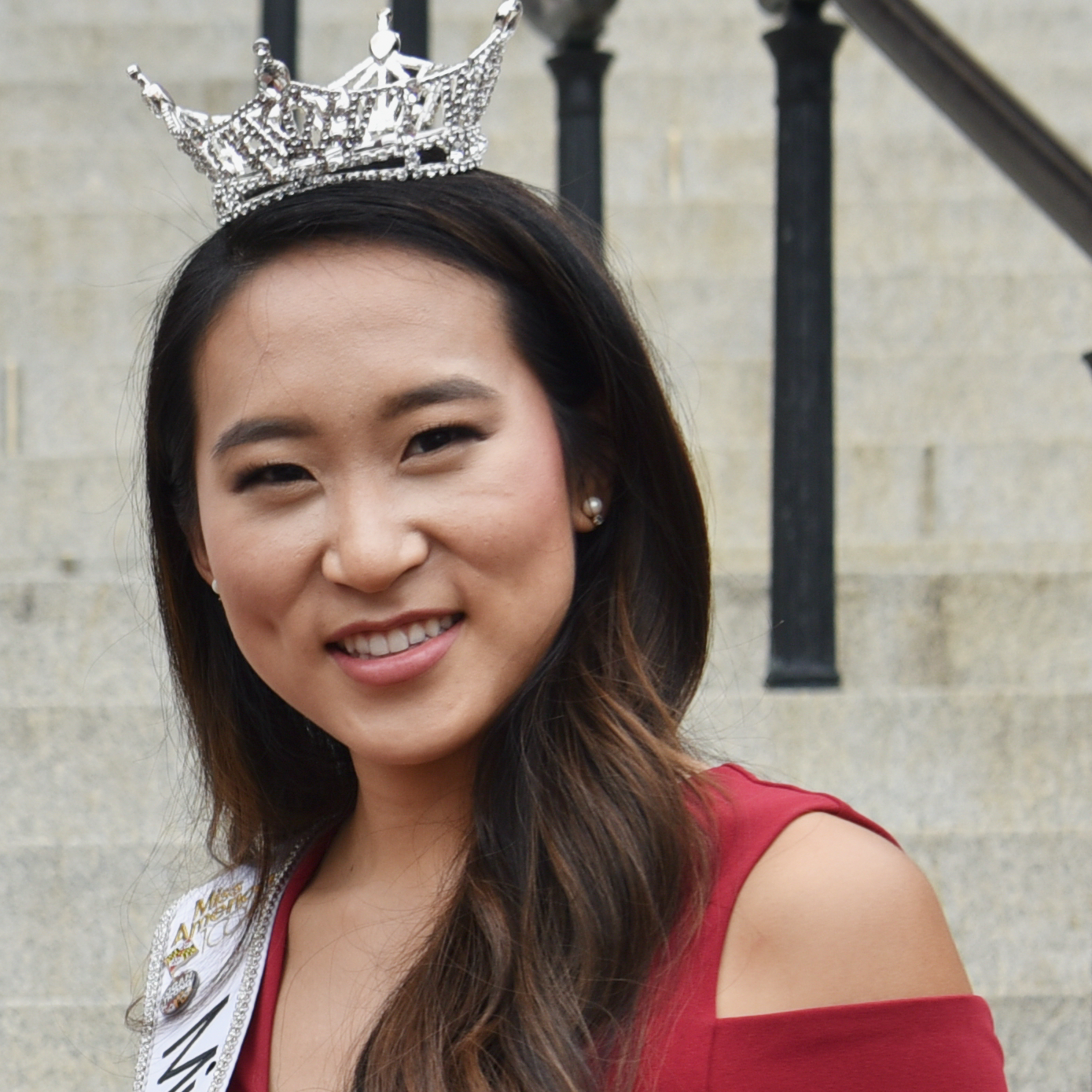
Lydia Sohn
Miss Maryland 2021

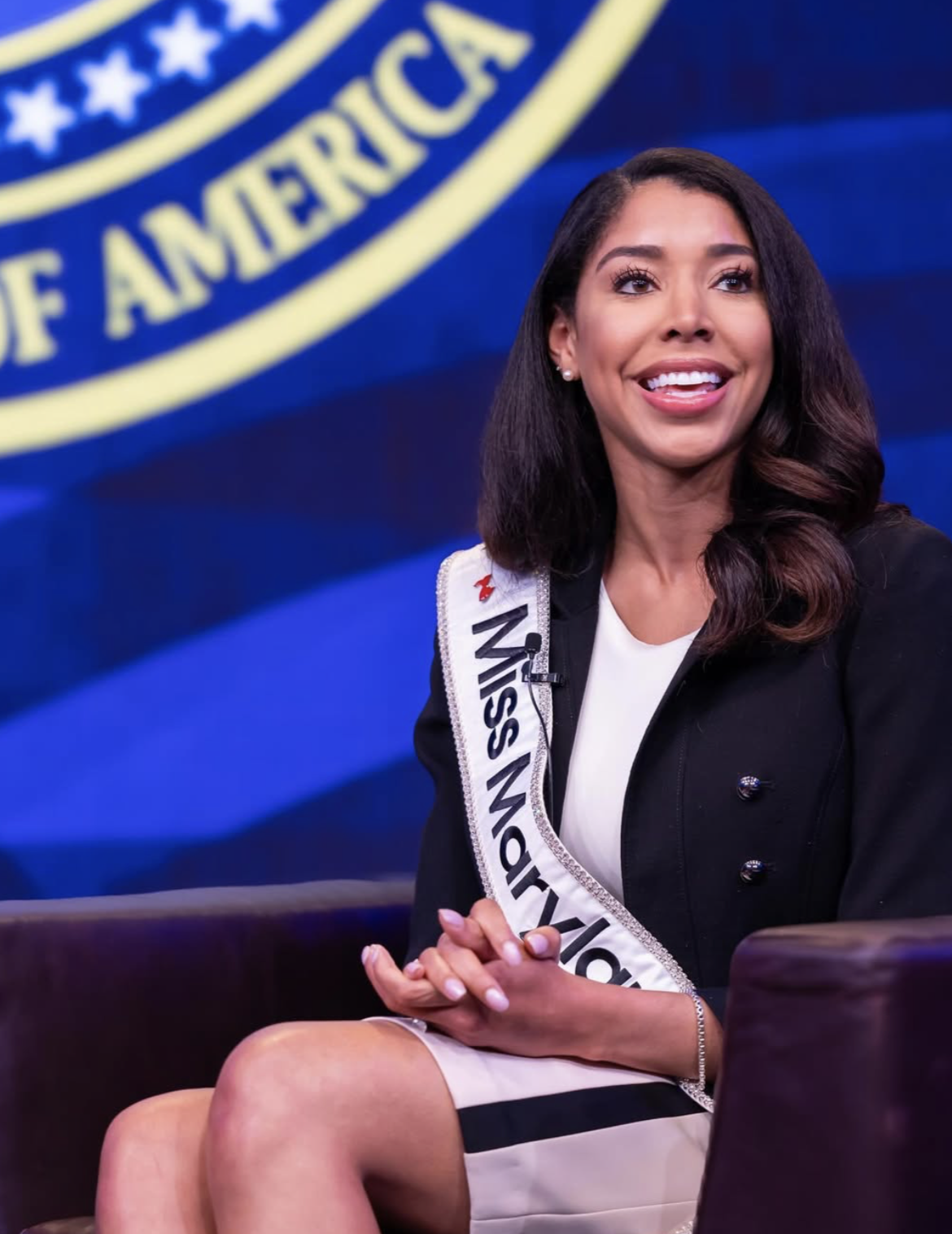
Kennedy Taylor
Miss Maryland 2023

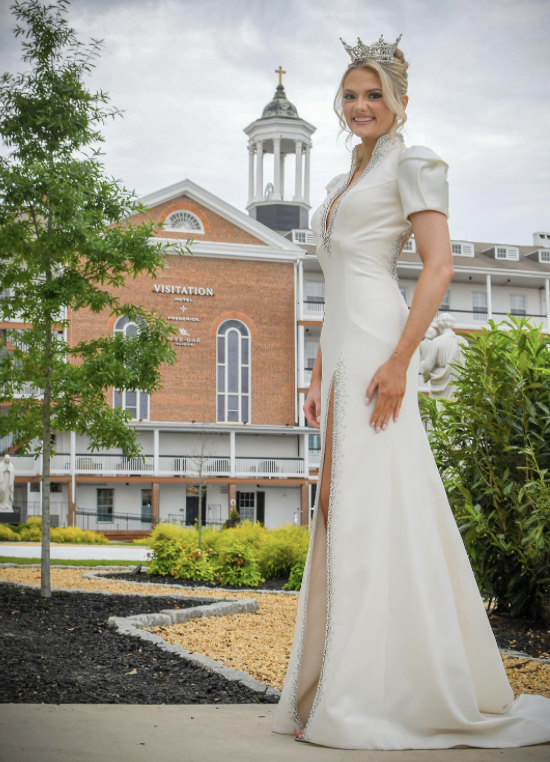
Bridget O'Brien
Miss Maryland 2024

== Results summary ==
Results of Miss Maryland titleholders at the national Miss America pageants/competitions. The year in parentheses indicates the year of the national competition, not the year attached to the contestant's state title.

- 1st runners-up: Virginia Cha (1990)
- 3rd runners-up: Hazel Harris (1921), Keri L. Schrader (2000), Marina Harrison (2004)
- 4th runners-up: Camille Lewis (2003)
- Top 7: Hannah Brewer (2017)
- Top 10: Georgia Reed (1952), Ingrid Christine Larson (1968), Kathleen Louise Neff (1973), Barbara Jean Jennings (1977), Tamara Alaine Walker (1988), Joanna Guy (2013), Christina Denny (2014)
- Top 11: Kennedy Taylor (2024), Maria Derisavi (2026)
- Top 12: Frances Stine (1935)
- Top 13: Virginia Lee Van Sant (1945)
- Top 20: Kelly Glorioso (2002)

=== Awards ===
==== Preliminary awards ====
- Preliminary Fitness: Kennedy Taylor (2024)
- Preliminary Evening Gown: Kennedy Taylor (2024), Maria Derisavi (2026)
- Preliminary Lifestyle & Fitness: Shelly Meg Peiken (1980), Jade Kenny (2015), Hannah Brewer (2017)
- Preliminary Talent: Beverly Anne Smith (1963) (tie), Debra Renea Fries (1992), Camille Lewis (2003), Joanna Guy (2013)

==== Non-finalist awards ====
- Non-finalist Talent: Linda Rita Peluzzo (1967), Veronica Marie Clarke (1976), Lisa Marie Daskal (1981), Debra Renea Fries (1992), Heather Noelle Davis (1998), Destiny Clark (2016)

==== Other awards ====
- Miss Congeniality: N/A
- Charles and Theresa Brown Scholarship: Joanna Guy (2013), Hannah Brewer (2017)
- Dr. & Mrs. David B. Allman Medical Scholarship: Barbara Jean Jennings (1977)
- Equity & Justice Scholarship Award Finalists: Caitlyn Stupi (2020)
- Jean Bartel Military Awareness Award: Kayla Willing (2023)
- Quality of Life Award Winners: Heather Noelle Davis (1998)
- Quality of Life Award 1st runners-up: Kelly Glorioso (2002), Joanna Guy (2013), Adrianna David (2019)
- Quality of Life Award 2nd runners-up: Jade Kenny (2015), Hannah Brewer (2017)
- Quality of Life Award Finalists: Lindsay Staniszewski (2011), Destiny Clark (2016)
- Women in Business Scholarship Award Finalists: Hannah Brewer (2017), Kathleen Masek (2018)
- American Heart Association Go Red For Women Regional Award: Bridget O’Brien (2024)

== Winners ==
- Declared as winner
- Ended as a runner-up
- Ended as a finalist or semi-finalist

Year	Name	Hometown	Age	Local Title	Talent	Placement at Miss America	Special scholarships at Miss America	Notes
2026	Gianna Romero	Joppatowne	21	Miss Washington County	Baton Twirling to "Twentieth Century Fox Mambo"			
2025	Maria Derisavi	Leonardtown	22	Miss St. Mary's County	HerStory	Top 11	Preliminary Evening Gown Award	Previously Miss Maryland Teen USA 2021 Top 16 at Miss Teen USA 2021
2024	Bridget O'Brien	Frederick	22	Miss Allegany County	Musical Theatre Vocal, "Don't Rain on My Parade"		AHA Go Red for Women Regional Award	Later Miss Maryland Volunteer 2027
2023	Kennedy Taylor	Silver Spring	26	Miss Allegany County	Latin Ballroom Dance, "Conga"	Top 11	Preliminary Evening Gown Award Preliminary Fitness Award	Previously Miss Maryland's Outstanding Teen 2012 Top 10 at Miss America's Outstanding Teen
2022	Kayla Willing	Deal Island	19	Miss Southern Maryland	Vocal		Jean Bartel Military Awareness Award	
2021	Lydia Sohn	Hanover	25	Miss Western Maryland	Cello			
2020	Allison Redman	Bel Air	25	Miss Western Maryland	Violin	Did not compete; 3rd runner-up at Miss Maryland 2019 pageant, later assumed the 2020 title after Stupi chose not to serve a second year; 2020 state pageant was cancelled due to the COVID-19 pandemic		
2019	Caitlyn Stupi	Westminster	21	Miss Allegany County	Cello, "The Swan"		Equity & Justice Scholarship Award Finalist	Later 2x runner-up at Miss Maryland USA
2018	Adrianna David	Rockville	24	Miss Charm of the Chesapeake	Vocal, "You've Got Possibilities"		Quality of Life Award 1st runner-up	Previously Miss Maryland USA 2017
2017	Kathleen Masek	Westminster	22	Miss White Oak	Theatrical Dance		Women in Business Scholarship Finalist	
2016	Hannah Brewer	Manchester	19	Miss Rocky Gap	Vocal, "God Bless America"	Top 7	Charles and Theresa Brown Scholarship Preliminary Lifestyle & Fitness Award Quality of Life Award 2nd runner-up Women in Business Scholarship Finalist	Sister of Miss Pennsylvania 2005, Nicole Brewer Previously Miss Maryland Teen USA 2013; Top 16 at Miss Teen USA 2013 pageant
2015	Destiny Clark	Gaithersburg	23	Miss Anne Arundel County	Original vocal with Guitar accompaniment, "Everything Happens For a Reason"		Non-finalist Talent Award Quality of Life Award Finalist	
2014	Jade Kenny	Madison	23	Miss Allegany County	Contemporary Ballet en Pointe, "Gonna Make You Sweat (Everybody Dance Now)"		Preliminary Lifestyle & Fitness Award Quality of Life Award 2nd runner-up	Semifinalist at Miss District of Columbia USA 2018; 3rd runner-up at Miss Virginia USA 2019
2013	Christina Denny	Owings Mills	22	Miss Western Maryland	Vocal, "For Good"	Top 10		Later Miss Maryland USA 2016
2012	Joanna Guy	Swanton	20	Miss Queen State	Vocal, "I Dreamed a Dream"	Top 10	Charles and Theresa Brown Scholarship Preliminary Talent Award Quality of Life Award 1st runner-up	Previously Miss Maryland's Outstanding Teen 2008; 3rd runner-up at Miss America's Outstanding Teen 2009 pageant
2011	Carlie Colella	Hagerstown	20	Miss Central Maryland	Contemporary Dance, "The Edge of Glory"			
2010	Lindsay Staniszewski	Baltimore	22	Miss Montgomery County	Vocal, "A Change In Me" from Beauty and the Beast		Quality of Life Award Finalist	Sister of Miss Maryland's Outstanding Teen 2007, Miss Maryland Teen USA 2009, and Miss Maryland USA 2013, Kasey Staniszewski
2009	Brooke Poklemba	Westminster	20	Miss University City	Vocal, "A Broken Wing"			
2008	Louise Schlegel	Silver Spring	20	Miss Allegany County	Vocal, "If I Had My Way"			
2007	Shana Powell	Bowie	22	Miss Allegany County	Classical Vocal, "Glitter and Be Gay" from Candide			Sister of Miss Maryland Teen USA 2000, Niambi Powell
2006	Brittany Lietz	Edgewater	21	Miss Tidewater	Lyrical Dance, "The Gold"			
2005	Rachel Ellsworth	Fort Ashby, WV	21	Miss Western Maryland	Tap Dance, "Do Your Thing"			Eligible as a student at Allegany College
2004	Tiffany L. Jenkins	Silver Spring	24	Miss Gaithersburg	Vocal, "Take My Breath Away"			
2003	Marina Harrison	Severn	22	Miss Burtonsville	Vocal, "Fallin'"	3rd runner-up	Casual Wear Award	Later Miss Maryland USA 2005; Top 10 at Miss USA 2005 pageant
2002	Camille Lewis	Silver Spring	23	Miss College Park	Violin, "Victory"	4th runner-up	Preliminary Talent Award Preliminary Evening Wear Award Overall Talent Award	Top 10 at National Sweetheart 1999 & 2001 pageants
2001	Kelly Glorioso	Fallston	21	Miss Free State	Vocal, "I'm Afraid This Must Be Love"	Top 20	Quality of Life Award 1st runner-up	
2000	Sonia Maria Amir	Beltsville	24	Miss Bethesda	Classical Piano, "Hungarian Rhapsody No. 2"			
1999	Keri L. Schrader	Rockville	24	Miss College Park	Ballet en Pointe, "The Stars and Stripes Forever"	3rd runner-up		Previously National Sweetheart 1998 as Miss Florida
1998	Heather Noelle Davis	Severna Park	23	Miss Southern Maryland	Classical Piano Medley, "Flight of the Bumblebee" & "Doctor Gradus ad Parnassum" & "Hungarian Rhapsody No.13"		Quality of Life Award Non-finalist Talent Award Steinway Piano Performance Award	As of 2023, only Miss Maryland to have won Quality of Life Award. Earned $10,000 scholarship and opportunity to speak at a focused press conference discussing winner's program/issue of choice. As a non-finalist, this year's Miss Maryland earned more scholarships as a competitor at Miss America than the 2nd runner up to Miss America.
1997	Jaime Fox	Frederick	21	Miss Prince George's County	Vocal, "With One Look" from Sunset Boulevard			
1996	Susan Elizabeth Alexander	Silver Spring	24	Miss Lanham	Vocal, "Sing Me"			
1995	Marcia Griffith	Fort Washington	23	Miss Federal City	Lyrical Ballet, "Somewhere"			
1994	Karissa Brooke Jones	Hagerstown	23	Miss Western Maryland	Ballet en Pointe, "The Can-Can"			
1993	Renee Cole	Bowie	22	Miss Northwest Maryland	Vocal, "The Star-Spangled Banner"			
1992	Tammy Wyatt	Clinton	26	Miss Towson	Vocal, "Stuff Like That There"			
1991	Debra Renea Fries	Waldorf	26	Miss Tidewater	Baton Twirling, "Hooked on America"		Preliminary Talent Award Non-finalist Talent Award	
1990	Kimberly Ann Grimm	Mountain Lake Park	20	Miss Allegany County	Vocal, "One, Two, Three Say You Love Me"			
1989	Virginia Cha	Frederick	25	Miss Frederick	Classical Piano, "Étude Op. 25, No. 1" by Chopin	1st runner-up		
1988	Lori Ann Windsor	Mount Airy	20	Miss Bel Air	Dance / Baton Twirling			
1987	Tamara Walker	Kingsville	21	Miss Montgomery County	Vocal, "Don't Rain on My Parade"	Top 10		
1986	Katrina Owens	Pikesville	24	Miss Prince George's County	Jazz Dance			
1985	Jennifer Louise Charlton	Bethesda	22	Miss Montgomery County	Vocal / Dance, "Last Blues Song"			
1984	Mary Elizabeth Haroth	Towson	25	Miss Towson	Vocal, "Memory" from Cats			
1983	Amy Elizabeth Keys	Lanham	26	Miss Howard County	Popular Vocal, "I'll Never Love This Way Again"			
1982	Lynne Carol Graham	Bethesda	23	Miss Lanham	Popular Vocal, "Alfie"			Mother of Miss Kentucky 2007, Kaitlynne Postel
1981	Robin Harmon	Hagerstown	24	Miss Washington County	Greek Dramatic Monologue from Antigone			
1980	Lisa Marie Daskal	Cumberland	18	Miss Allegany County	Vocal & Dance		Non-finalist Talent Award	
1979	Shelly Meg Peiken	Greenbelt	22	Miss Anne Arundel	Self-Composed Vocal, "Carry Me Home"		Preliminary Swimsuit Award	
1978	Caroline JoAnn Donnelly	College Park	21	Miss Lanham	Classical Piano, "Toccata in E-flat minor" by Aram Khachaturian			
1977	Donna Marie Silvestri	Catonsville	18	Miss Baltimore	Modern Jazz Dance / Baton Twirling, "Gonna Fly Now"			
1976	Barbara Jean Jennings	Greenbelt	25	Miss Prince George's County	Piano, "Morceaux de fantaisie" by Rachmaninoff	Top 10	Dr. David B. Allman Medical Scholarship	
1975	Veronica Marie Clarke	Bel Air	21	Miss Greater Harford County	Popular Vocal, "Don't Rain On My Parade"		Non-finalist Talent Award	
1974	Susan Jane Wohlfarth	Potomac	21	Miss Olney	Classical Ballet, Giselle			
1973	Kristi Maurine Reindl	LaVale	19	Miss Frostburg State College	Tympani, "The Champ"			Former mayor of O'Fallon, Illinois
1972	Kathleen Louise Neff	Cumberland	21	Miss Frostburg State College	Dramatic Soliloquy, "Shall I Tell You What I Think of You" from The King and I	Top 10		
1971	Joan Michele Ehrgott	Avondale	21	Miss Prince George's County	Vocal / Dance, "If My Friends Could See Me Now"			
1970	Sharon Anne Cannon	Salisbury	21	Miss Annendale	Piano, "Elephant Walk"			
1969	Margaret Elaine Mackle	Cecilton	21	Miss Beltsville	Dramatic Monologue			
1968	Karen Anne Hansen	College Park	20	Miss University of Maryland	Vocal, "Just You Wait" from My Fair Lady			
1967	Ingrid Christine Larson	Ellicott City	20	Miss North Carroll County	Piano, "Doctor Gradus ad Parnassum"	Top 10		
1966	Linda Rita Peluzzo	Oxon Hill	19	Miss Clinton-Camp Springs/Crescent City	Original Monologue & Accordion		Non-finalist Talent Award	
1965	Barbara Lynn Hamilton	College Park	19	Miss Prince George's County	Vocal, "Can't Help Lovin' Dat Man"			
1964	Sharon Rae Burlington	Aberdeen		Miss Harford County		Did not compete; later assumed title after McCauley resigned		
1964	Donna Marie McCauley	Rockville	19	Miss Montgomery County	Interpretive Ballet			Resigned after the Miss America 1965 pageant
1963	Carolyn Bond Wright	Forest Hill		Miss Harford County	Sketch / Ballet / Modern Jazz Dance			
1962	Beverly Ann Smith	Essex	18	Miss Baltimore Area	Organ & Piano, Warsaw Concerto		Preliminary Talent Award (tie)	
1961	Patricia Ann Moon	Bethesda	18	Miss Bethesda	Modern Jazz Dance			
1960	Robin Carole Davis	Hyattsville	18	Miss Prince George's County	Vocal, "I Cain't Say No"			
1959	Marie Lorraine True	Phoenix	19		Vocal / Tap Dance from The Best Things in Life Are Free			
1958	Mary Roberta Page	Bethesda			Chalk Sketch			
1957	Nancy Elizabeth Norris	Silver Spring			Dramatic Monologue, "A Letter To My Parents"			
1956	Jeannette Louise Rosensteel	Baltimore	21		Vocal			
1955	Carol Jennette	Westminster			Fashion Display & Speech, "How To Pack a Suitcase"			
1954	Phyllis Yvonne Leftwich	Dundalk			Vocal			
1953	Meta Frances Justice	Crisfield			Vocal, "Ave Maria"			
1952	Shirley Virginia Harrison	Baltimore			Monologue from Tom Sawyer			
1951	Georgia Reed	Baltimore			Vocal, "Love Is Where You Find It" from The Kissing Bandit	Top 10		
1950	Ann Uri	Baltimore			Vocal / Piano			
1949	Jean Crow	Baltimore			Fashion Design			
1948	Juanita Melrose Lookabaugh	Cumberland			Hawaiian Hula Dance & Dress Design			
1947	Carolyn Jean Dixon	Cumberland			Vocal, "It Had to Be You"			
1946	Virginia Martin	Baltimore		Miss Baltimore				Multiple Maryland representatives Contestants competed under local title at Miss America pageant
1946	Dorothy Crockett	Baltimore		Miss Maryland	Original Poetry Recitation			Multiple Maryland representatives Contestants competed under local title at Miss America pageant
1945	Virginia Lee Van Sant	Cumberland			Vocal, "Ain't Misbehavin'"	Top 13		
1944	Audrey Klingenberg	Baltimore						
1943	Shirlee O'Connell	Baltimore		Miss Baltimore				Multiple Maryland representatives Contestants competed under local title at Miss America pageant
1943	Lillian Marlene Huber	Baltimore		Miss Maryland				Multiple Maryland representatives Contestants competed under local title at Miss America pageant
1942	Bettye Mitchell	Baltimore						
1941	Penny Malone	Baltimore						
1940	Marie Beiser	Baltimore						
1939	Elaine Pasqualla	Crisfield						
1938	Yolanda Ugarte	Baltimore						
1937	May Vivian Miller	Baltimore		Miss Baltimore				Multiple Maryland representatives Contestants competed under local title at Miss America pageant
1937	Margaret Myers	Rock Hall		Miss Eastern Shores				Multiple Maryland representatives Contestants competed under local title at Miss America pageant
1936	Anne Margaret Kane	Baltimore		Miss Baltimore				Multiple Maryland representatives Contestants competed under local title at Miss America pageant
1936	Ethel Holland	Berlin		Miss Maryland				Multiple Maryland representatives Contestants competed under local title at Miss America pageant
1935	Frances Stine	Baltimore		Miss Baltimore		Top 12		No Miss Maryland Competed under local title at Miss America pageant
1934	No national pageant was held							
1933	Dorothy Dennis		16		N/A			
1932	No national pageants were held							
1931	No national pageants were held							
1930	No national pageants were held							
1929	No national pageants were held							
1928	No national pageants were held							
1927	Beulah Goldsborough			Miss Baltimore	N/A			No Miss Maryland Competed under local title at Miss America pageant
1926	Mildred Adam			Miss Baltimore	N/A			No Miss Maryland Competed under local title at Miss America pageant
1925	Thelma Krakan			Miss Baltimore	N/A			Multiple Maryland representatives Contestants competed under local title at Miss America pageant
1925	Mildred Lee Purdy			Miss Frederick	N/A			Multiple Maryland representatives Contestants competed under local title at Miss America pageant
1925	Aleda Bradford Cook			Miss Hagerstown	N/A			Multiple Maryland representatives Contestants competed under local title at Miss America pageant
1924	Mary Rose Kenny			Miss Baltimore	N/A			Multiple Maryland representatives Contestants competed under local title at Miss America pageant
1924	Gretchen Carney			Miss Cumberland	N/A			Multiple Maryland representatives Contestants competed under local title at Miss America pageant
1923	Billie Muller	Baltimore		Miss Baltimore	N/A			Multiple Maryland representatives Contestants competed under local title at national pageant
1923	Elizabeth Catherine Steele	Cumberland	18	Miss Cumberland	N/A			Multiple Maryland representatives Contestants competed under local title at national pageant
1922	Irma Knabe	Baltimore		Miss Baltimore	N/A			Competed under local title at national pageant
1921	Hazel Harris	Ocean City		Miss Ocean City	N/A	3rd runner-up		Competed under local title at national pageant
