= Destiny Clark =

American musician and beauty pageant winner

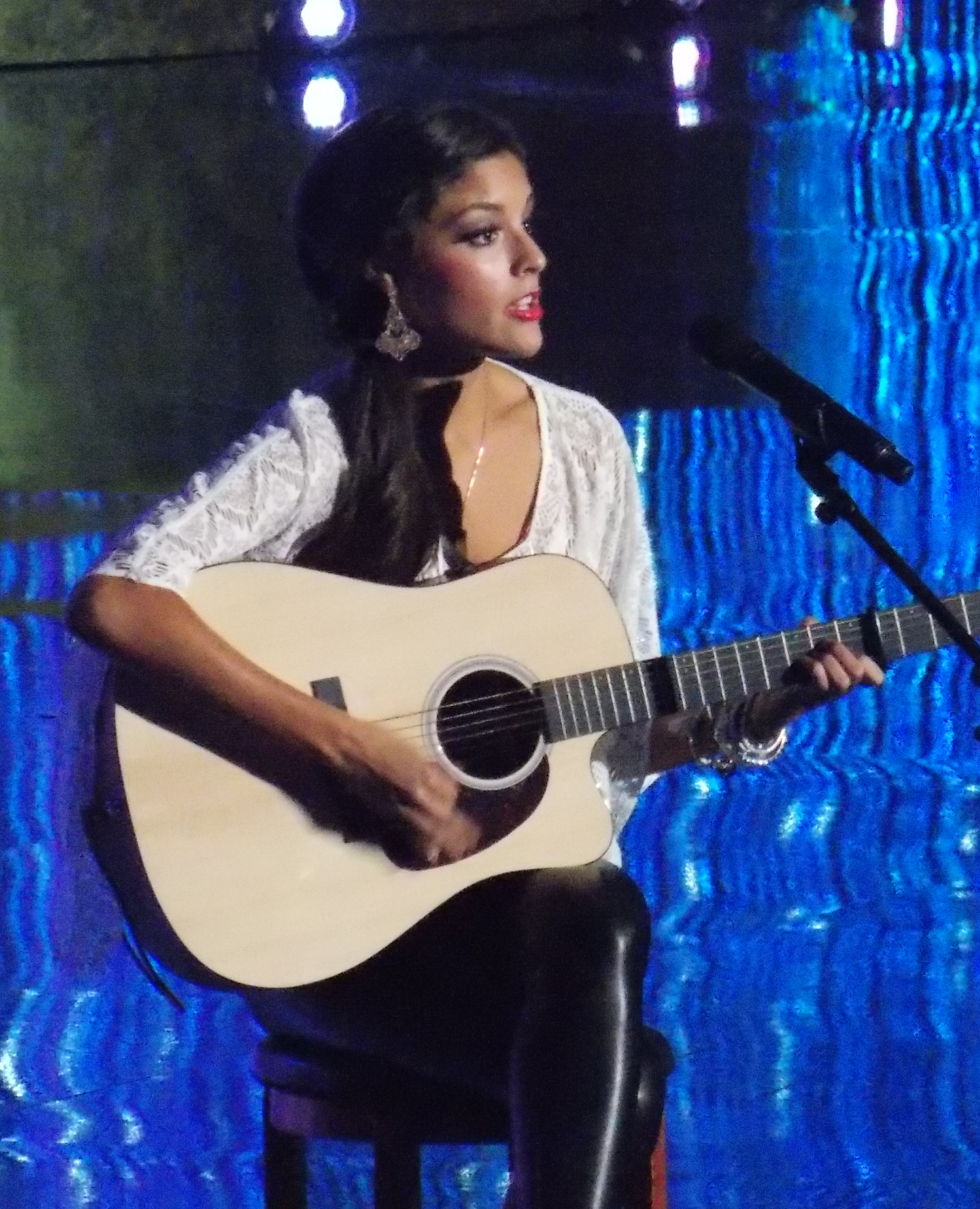
- Born: Destiny Clark
- Height: 5 ft (1.5 m)
- Beauty pageant titleholder
- Title: Miss Anne Arundel County 2015; Miss Maryland 2015
- Hair color: Brown
- Eye color: Hazel
- Major competition: Miss America 2016
- Website: destinyclark.com

Destiny Clark is a beauty pageant titleholder from Gaithersburg, Maryland. She was crowned Miss Maryland 2015 and competed for the Miss America 2016 title in September 2015.

== Biography ==
=== Beginning in pageants ===
Clark has participated in both the Miss USA and Miss America pageant systems. In October 2014, she was selected as a state finalist in Maryland's Miss USA pageant system. After raising the $995 entry fee through a GoFundMe campaign, Clark competed in the 2015 Miss Maryland USA pageant held October 31 – November 2, 2014, placing 3rd, losing to eventual winner Mamé Adjei.

=== As Miss Maryland (Miss Maryland 2015) ===
On January 11, 2015, Clark was crowned Miss Anne Arundel County 2015. She entered the Miss Maryland pageant at Hagerstown's Maryland Theater in June 2015 as one of 24 qualifiers for the state title. Clark's competition talent was singing her original composition "Everything Happens for a Reason" while playing a guitar. Her platform is "Forge Your Own Destiny: The Importance of Self-Discovery and Mentorship for Our Youth". Clark won the Miss Maryland competition on Saturday, June 27, 2015, when she received her crown from outgoing Miss Maryland titleholder Jade Kenny. She earned more than $10,000 in scholarship money from the state pageant. As Miss Maryland, her activities included public appearances across the state of Maryland.

Clark was dedicated to using the Miss Maryland title as a true "year of service" to her community and causes. She assisted in raising over $3M as Miss Maryland for various charities, including Children's Miracle Network Hospitals.

=== Miss America contestant and "Top Talent" award (Miss America 2016) ===
Clark was Maryland's representative at the Miss America 2016 pageant in Atlantic City, New Jersey, in September 2015, In the televised finale on September 13, 2015, Clark was named the "Top Talent" and was awarded an additional $1,000 scholarship award for her original vocal and guitar performance and was awarded a $3,000 scholarship prize as her state's representative.

Awards and achievements
| Preceded by Jade Kenny | Miss Maryland; 2015 | Succeeded by Hannah Brewer |
