= Anderson Chapel =

Historic church in Maryland, US

- U.S. National Register of Historic Places
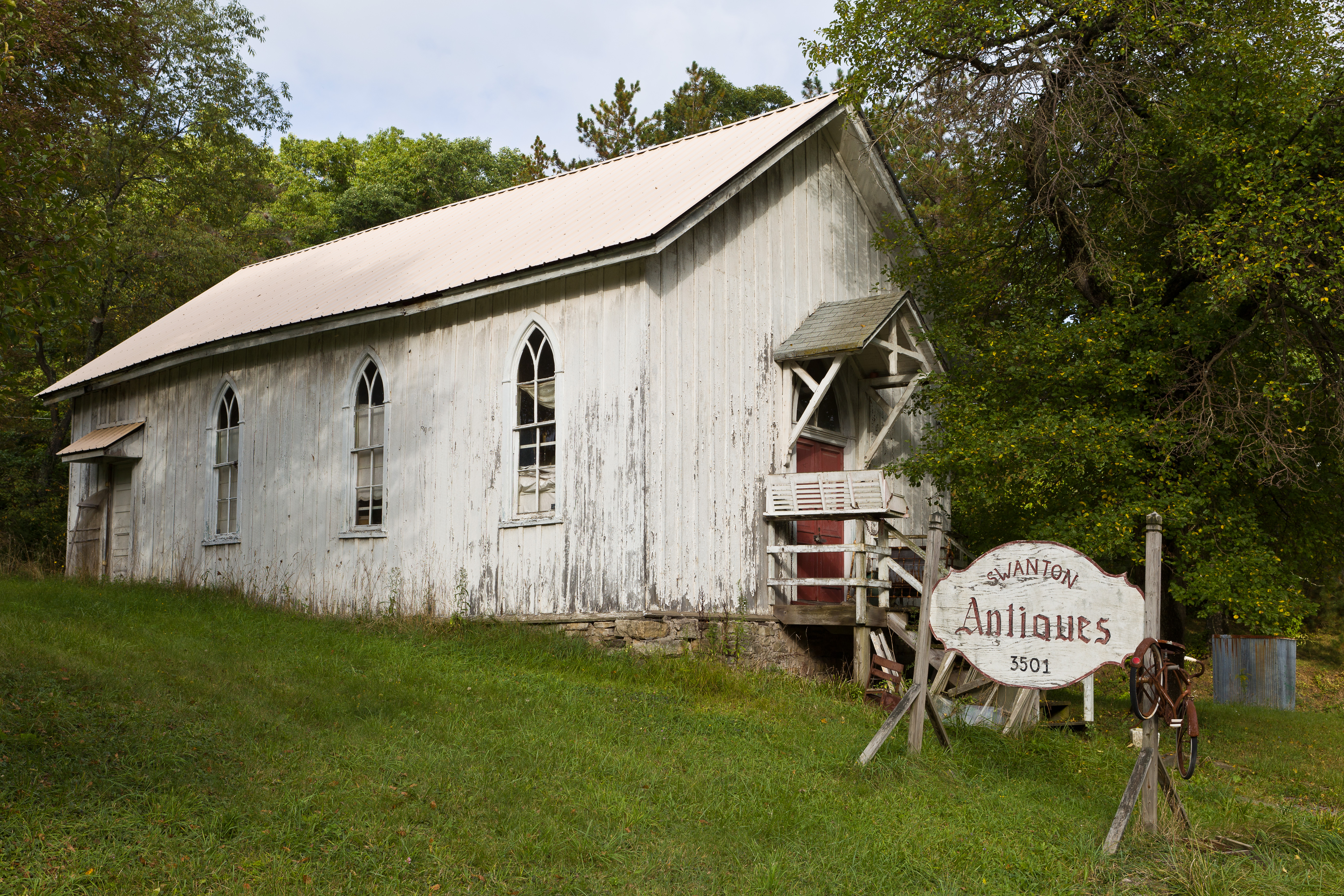

- Location within Maryland Location within the United States
- Location: Swanton Hill and Pine Hill Rds., Swanton, Maryland
- Coordinates: 39°27′34″N 79°13′53″W
- Area: less than one acre
- Built: 1882
- Architectural style: Carpenter Gothic
- NRHP reference No.: 84001775
- Added to NRHP: June 7, 1984

Anderson Chapel, also known as St. Paul's Episcopal Chapel, is a historic Episcopal church located at Swanton, Garrett County, Maryland. It is a late-19th century frame, one-story, gable-roofed church built in the Carpenter Gothic board-and-batten style. This style was popularized by the architect Richard Upjohn during the 19th century.

It was listed on the National Register of Historic Places in 1984.
