= Jamie O'Brien (beauty queen) =

American television host (born 1988)

- Born: Jamie Linck O'Brien; April 9, 1988 (age 38); Baltimore, Maryland
- Height: 5 ft 4 in (1.63 m)
- Beauty pageant titleholder
- Title: Miss Maryland Teen USA 2006
- Hair color: Blonde
- Eye color: Blue
- Major competition: Miss Teen USA 2006 (Top 10)

Jamie Linck O'Brien (born April 9, 1988) is from Baltimore, Maryland. She now works as a Television Host for Sinclair Broadcast Group's CW22 & MyRDC28 in Raleigh, North Carolina (WLFL | WRDC). O'Brien also has a background in Radio, serving as a Traffic Reporter for Radio 96.1 (WBBB), a rock station in Raleigh, North Carolina. Prior to her move to North Carolina, O'Brien interned with VH1 in Santa Monica, California.

O'Brien was crowned Miss Maryland Teen USA in 2006 held in late 2005. This was her second attempt at the title, as she had been a semi-finalist in the 2004 event. O'Brien represented Maryland in the Miss Teen USA 2006 competition broadcast live from Palm Springs, California in August 2006. She placed in the top ten of the nationally televised pageant, which was won by Katie Blair of Montana. This was Maryland's third consecutive placement in the pageant, the first time this has occurred.

O'Brien stars in the horror comedy feature film Swarm of the Snakehead. She graduated from Garrison Forest School in 2006 and graduated from Elon University in May 2010.

Preceded by Alessandra Torres	Miss Maryland Teen USA; 2006	Succeeded by Allison Farrow
