= Renee Cole =

American beauty pageant contestant

Renee Cole (born c. 1971) is a former American beauty pageant contestant who was crowned Miss Maryland 1993.
