= Hunting Humans =

- DVD released by MTI Home Video
- Directed by: Kevin Kangas
- Written by: Kevin Kangas
- Produced by: Rick Ganz; Kevin Kangas
- Starring: Rick Ganz; Bubby Lewis
- Narrated by: Rick Ganz
- Cinematography: David Maurice Gil
- Edited by: Harvey Glatman
- Music by: Evan Evans
- Production company: Marauder Productions
- Distributed by: MTI Home Video; IFM World Releasing
- Release date: October 2002 (B-Movie Film Festival)
- Running time: 88 minutes
- Country: United States
- Language: English

Hunting Humans is a 2002 horror film written and directed by Kevin Kangas. The film gained notoriety when a copy of it was found among the possessions of murderer Adam Leroy Lane.

== Plot ==
In Maryland, Aric Blue, a mortgage broker, leads a double life as a narcissistic serial killer, one who prides himself in discerning his victims' patterns and routines, while claiming to not have any traceable ones of his own. One night, Aric breaks into a multiplex to murder a projectionist, who he is shocked to discover is already dead, with a note left on his body that reads "I've Got Your Pattern". Enraged over the prospect of someone being on to him, Aric, in a fit of paranoia, shoots a suspicious dog walker. A few nights later, Aric is beaten unconscious in his home by the actual stalker, who identifies himself as "Dark". After Aric hires a private investigator named Marv to uncover information on Dark, his self-proclaimed rival challenges him to outdo his slaying of three picnickers, which Aric does by knifing four people in a theatre. Afterward, Aric learns from Marv that Dark is watching him through his own P.I., Frank Cooper.

Aric dismisses Marv, and picks up where he left off, intent on digging up everything he can on Dark through Frank. While doing so, Aric realizes that Dark is also spying on him through a co-worker named Barb, who Aric threatens into helping with his plan to get rid of Dark. Later, Aric breaks into Frank's house again, and this time he is confronted by Marv, who is really Dark. The two serial killers try to one-up each other with various trump cards, ending with Dark gunning down Frank (who kept switching sides for monetary reasons) and running off when Aric reveals he has brought along a sniper rifle-wielding workmate named Doug. Aric chases and fights Dark in the woods, with Dark having the upper hand until Aric shoots him with a handgun, one of eighteen he had left in the area in anticipation that his and Dark's battle would take place outside. Brad (who is unaware of Aric's true nature) appears, and is murdered by Aric, who relocates to another city after eliminating the rest of his co-workers, and other loose ends.

== Cast ==
- Rick Ganz as Aric Blue
- Bubby Lewis as Aaron "Dark" Deckard
- Lisa Michele as Barb
- Trent as Frank Cooper
- Arthur Smith Jr. as Oliver Rust
- Jeff Kipers as Ken
- Catherine Granville as Carol Ann Stennings
- Joe Ripple as Police Detective
- Duke McClure as Brad
- James Fellows as Doug Fellows
- Rick Shipley as Corey Aaron Markbright
- Allison Klyn as Egg Girl
- Paul C. Kangas as Randy Jacob Green

== Release ==
The film has been released multiple times on DVD, it was first released on Jul 22, 2003 by MTI Home Video. It was re-released later that same year by Film 2000. On Jan 1, 2007 the film was re-released on DVD by Trinity. The film was last released on DVD as a part of a double-sided combo pack with three other films which was released by Allegro Corporation on Jun 7, 2011.

== Reception ==
While Bill Paterson of Beyond Hollywood was critical of elements like the dialogue and acting, he admitted that the storyline was innovative and disturbing, and that "production value aside, the film is tightly edited and flows nicely". Horror Talk's Steve Pattee gave Hunting Humans an overall grade of 3½ out of 5, and wrote, "Kangas has entered moviemaking not with a bang, but an explosion. Some of his visuals make me wonder if — given time to develop — he will have a unique style that will make his movies immediately recognizable, like Martin Scorsese's or Michael Mann's. For now, however, he has written a mean, smart, original script with Humans and has done an admirable job directing it as well". Conversely, Evan Wade of Something Awful allotted the film a score of -37 out -50, and described it as "the kind of project that comes about when a bunch of people from the YMCA summer creative writing course decide to get together, overdose on Benadryl, and write a movie". In a review of Kangas's 2004 feature Fear of Clowns, DVD Talk's Scott Weinberg dismissed Hunting Humans as something "you needn't rent anytime soon".
