= Virginia Cha =

- Education: Princeton University
- Occupation: News anchor

Virginia Cha is an American news anchor now retired. She was formerly employed at HLN based in Atlanta, and as an NBC News correspondent based in New York.

Cha graduated from Princeton University and is a Fulbright Scholar.

== Career ==
Cha began her news career at WFSB in Hartford, Connecticut. She was a general assignment reporter, substitute anchor, then head anchor and reporter for the morning news.

She then became a news anchor and chief medical correspondent for WBZ TV-4 in Boston, Massachusetts, where she won three Emmy Awards for Outstanding Individual Achievement and a National Edward R. Murrow Award for Team Political Coverage.

She was an anchor on MSNBC's MSNBC Live, NBC's NBC Nightly News, and CNN and CNN's HLN.

== Personal life ==
Cha is married to Edward. Cha was Miss Frederick when she entered and won the Miss Maryland 1989 pageant. She was 1st runner-up to Debbye Turner at the 1990 Miss America pageant. She plays the piano.
