= Miss Maryland Teen USA =

Beauty pageant competition

- Formation: 1983
- Type: Beauty pageant
- Headquarters: Clermont
- Location: Florida
- Members: Miss Teen USA
- Official language: English
- Key people: Deborah Miller; Cindy Provost
- Website: Official website

The Miss Maryland Teen USA competition is the pageant that selects the representative for the state of Maryland in the Miss Teen USA pageant.

Maryland did not place at Miss Teen USA until 1992, but since then this state has been quite successful, including earning four runner-up placements, and a winner in 2010.

Seven Maryland teens have gone on to win the Miss Maryland USA title, and two competed at Miss America.

The current Miss Maryland Teen USA is Sophie Pittman of Baltimore was crowned Miss Maryland Teen USA 2026 on July 26, 2026 at Hilton Parsippany Hotel in Parsippany. She will represent Maryland at Miss Teen USA 2026.

== Gallery of titleholders ==
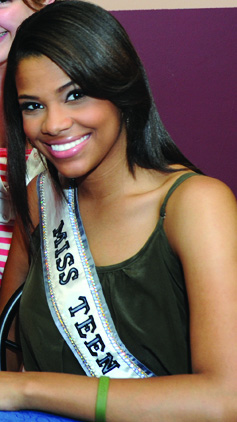
Kamie Crawford, Miss Maryland Teen USA 2010 & Miss Teen USA 2010

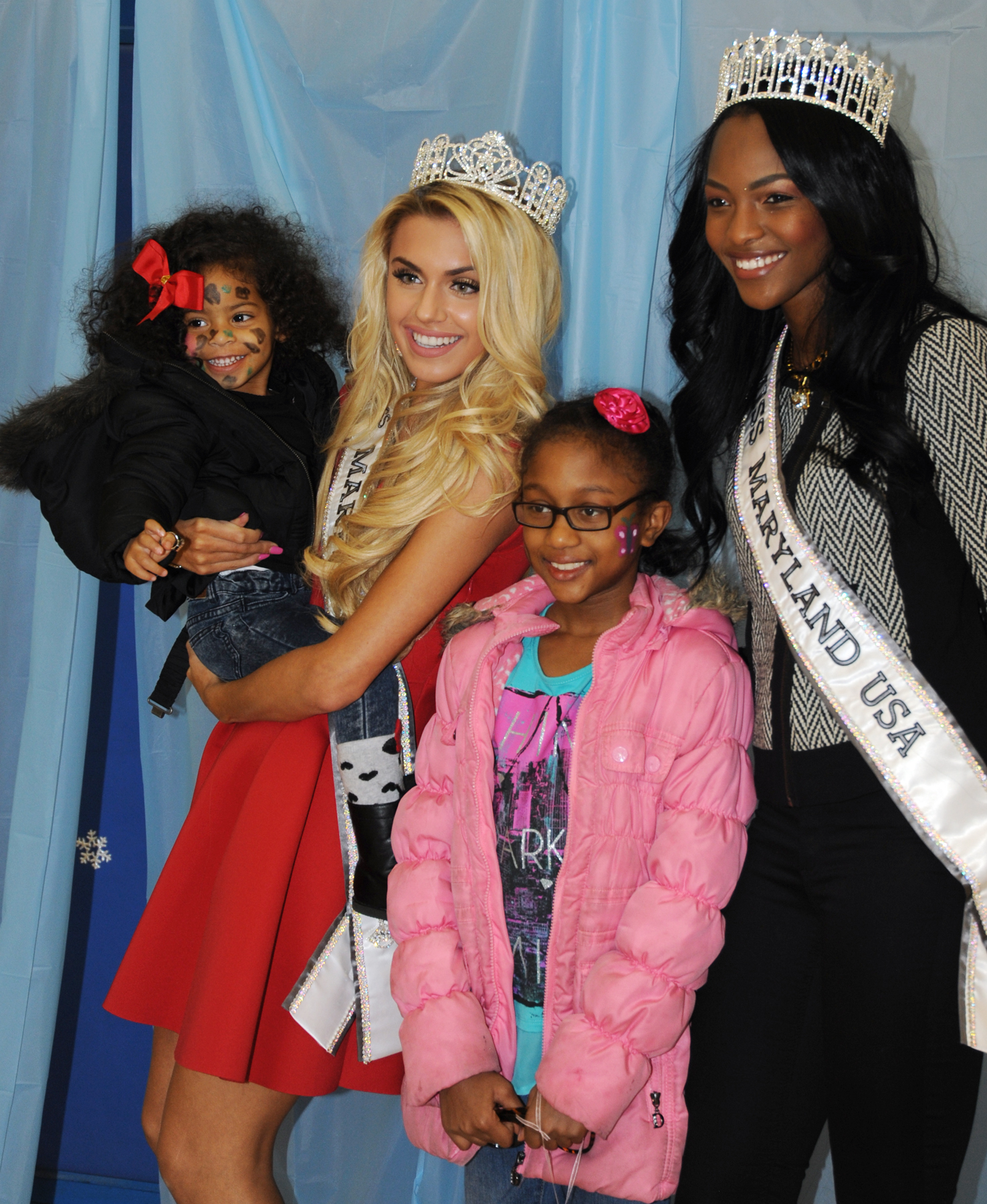
Taylor Dawson, Miss Maryland Teen USA 2015 and Mame Adjei, Miss Maryland USA 2015 at an event for military families

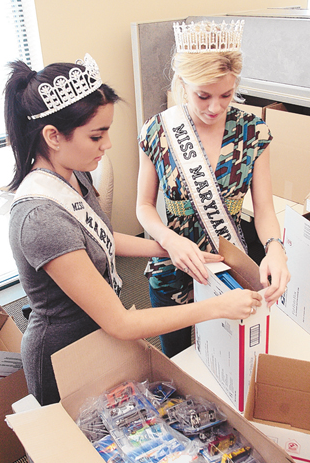
Ana Maria Lawson, Miss Maryland Teen USA 2008 assembles military care packages with Casandra Tressler, Miss Maryland USA 2008

== Results summary ==
=== Placements ===
- Miss Teen USA: Kamie Crawford (2010)
- 2nd runner-up: Khosi Roy (1999)
- 3rd runners-up: Michelle Attai (2002), Amanda Williams (2004), Kasey Staniszewski (2009)
- Top 6: Jennifer Smith (1996)
- Top 10: Jamie O'Brien (2006)
- Top 12: Vanessa Malinas (1992)
- Top 15: Alessandra Torres (2005), Kirsten Nicholson (2011), Taylor Spruill (2017), Caleigh Shade (2018), Amalia Sanches (2019)
- Top 16: Hannah Brewer (2013), Maria Derisavi (2021)

Maryland holds a record of 15 placements at Miss Teen USA.

=== Awards ===
- Miss Photogenic: Stacey Harris (1989), Mary Ann Cimino (1990), Allison Farrow (2007), Sanjana Yendluri (2024)

== Winners ==
- Declared as Winner
- Ended as runner-up
- Ended as one of the finalists or semifinalists

Year	Name	Hometown	Age^{1}	Local title	Placement at Miss Teen USA	Special awards at Miss Teen USA	Notes
2026	Sophie Pittman	Baltimore	19	Miss University of Maryland Teen			
2025	Zoe Zuzak	Frostburg	18	Miss Western Maryland Teen			Previously Miss Maryland's Teen 2024; Preliminary Evening Gown Winner at Miss America's Teen 2025
2024	Sanjana Yendluri	Germantown	19	Miss Montgomery County Teen	Top 10	Miss Photogenic	
2023	Madelyn Posey	Newburg	17	Miss Newburg Teen			
2022	Soniya Krishan	Wheaton	19				
2021	Maria Derisavi	Leonardtown	18		Top 16		Later Miss Maryland 2025, placing Top 11 at Miss America 2026
2020	Heavyn McDaniels	Baltimore	18				
2019	Amalia Sanches	Bethesda	17		Top 15		
2018	Caleigh Shade	Cumberland	18		Top 15		Later Miss Maryland USA 2022
2017	Taylor Spruill	Upper Marlboro	18		Top 15		
2016	Amy Ingram	Germantown	18				
2015	Taylor Nicole Dawson	Germantown	17				
2014	Mariela Pepin	Severn	17				Born in Puerto Rico: Later placed Top 10 at Miss World America 2017; Later Miss Maryland USA 2019; Top 10 at Miss USA 2019; Later Miss Intercontinental Puerto Rico 2022; 1st runner-up at Miss Intercontinental 2022
2013	Hannah Brewer	Manchester	15		Top 16		Later Miss Maryland 2016; Top 7 Finalist at Miss America 2017; sister of Miss Pennsylvania 2005 Nicole Brewer
2012	Stephanie Chervenkov	Bel Air	17				
2011	Kirsten Nicholson	Sykesville	18		Top 15		
2010	Kamie Crawford	Potomac	17		Miss Teen USA 2010		
2009	Kasey Staniszewski	Edgewater	18		3rd runner-up		Sister of Miss Maryland 2010- Lindsay Staniszewski; Previously Miss Maryland's Outstanding Teen 2007; Later Miss Maryland USA 2013; Top 15 at Miss USA 2013
2008	Ana Maria Lawson	Westminster	16				
2007	Allison Farrow	Earleville	18			Miss Photogenic	
2006	Jamie O'Brien	Owings Mills	18		Top 10		
2005	Alessandra Torres	Potomac	18		Top 15		
2004	Amanda Williams	Jarrettsville	18		3rd runner-up		
2003	Courtney Hejl	Gaithersburg	17				
2002	Michelle Attai	Severn	18		3rd runner-up		
2001	Precious Grady	Baltimore	18				
2000	Niambi Powell	Bowie	17				Sister of Shana Powell, Miss Maryland 2007.
1999	Khosi Roy	Silver Spring	17		2nd runner-up		
1999	Kristina Sisco	Baltimore	18				Resigned when she was offered a role on As the World Turns
1998	Amber Coffman	Glen Burnie	16				
1997	Brandi Burkhardt	Pasadena	18				Later Miss New York 1999; vocalist and actress
1996	Jennifer Smith	Annapolis	18		Top 6		
1995	Jennifer Ritz	Phoenix	19				
1994	Denise Fisher	Rockville	18				
1993	Angelisa Proserpi	Linthicum	17				
1992	Vanessa Malinis	Baltimore	18		Semi-finalist		Died from cervical cancer on March 5, 2001
1991	Jennifer Wilhoit	Annapolis	18				Later Miss Maryland USA 1995; Semifinalist, finished 11th in Miss USA 1995
1990	Mary Ann Cimino	Baltimore	17			Miss Photogenic	Later Miss Maryland USA 1993
1989	Stacey Harris	Gaithersburg	18			Miss Photogenic	
1988	Sherry Twilley	Delmar	16				
1987	Renee Rebstock	Pasadena	17				Later Miss Maryland USA 1992
1986	Julie Stanford	Annapolis	18				Later Miss Maryland USA 1990
1985	Lynn Bogardus	Delmar	17				
1984	Christie Bohraus	Bethesda	17				
1983	Carla Kemp	Clinton	18				

^{1} Age at the time of the Miss Teen USA pageant
