= Megan Lyman =

Megan Hannah Lyman
- Born: April 15, 1991 (age 35); Gilford, New Hampshire
- Education: New England College
- Beauty pageant titleholder
- Title: Miss New Hampshire's Outstanding Teen 2008; Miss Lakes Region 2012; Miss New Hampshire 2012
- Hair color: Blonde
- Eye color: Brown
- Major competitions: Miss America's Outstanding Teen 2009; Miss America 2013

Megan Hannah Lyman (born April 15, 1991) is an American beauty pageant titleholder from Gilford, New Hampshire who was named Miss New Hampshire 2012. Megan currently works as a CBD advocate promoting natural health and healing with her company in Long Beach, California, Cannibabe.

== Biography ==
She won the title of Miss New Hampshire on April 28, 2012, when she received her crown from outgoing titleholder Regan Hartley. Lyman's platform is the Make-A-Wish Foundation. At age 12, Lyman was diagnosed with soft-tissue sarcoma and underwent seven surgeries to remove cancerous tissue from her right arm. Her competition talent was a tap dance to Lady Gaga's Edge of Glory. Lyman is a junior at New England College, majoring in elementary and special education. In 2008, Lyman won the title of Miss New Hampshire's Outstanding Teen, and went on to compete in the Miss America's Outstanding Teen pageant in 2009.

Awards and achievements
Preceded by Regan Hartley	Miss New Hampshire; 2012	Succeeded by Samantha Russo
Preceded by Julia Neveu	Miss New Hampshire's Outstanding Teen; 2008	Succeeded by Katrina Rossi
