= Kevin Kangas =

American film maker

Kevin Kangas is an American film maker. He is a screenwriter and director of horror films and films about serial killers. Many of his films have been shot in his home state of Maryland.

== Filmography ==
=== Writer ===
- Red Fish Blue Fish (2011) (in production) (writer)
- Garden of Hedon (2011) (co-writer)
- Bounty (2010) (screenplay)
- Fear of Clowns 2 (2007) (writer)
- Fear of Clowns (2004) (writer)
- Hunting Humans (2002) (writer)
- Terrortory (writer, segment: )

=== Producer ===
- Terrortory (producer, segment: )
- Bounty (2010) (producer)
- Fear of Clowns 2 (2007) (executive producer)
- Fear of Clowns (2004) (producer)
- Hunting Humans (2002) (producer)

=== Director ===
- Terrortory (2014, segment: Smiling Jack)
- Garden of Hedon (2011)
- Bounty (2010)
- Fear of Clowns 2 (2007)
- Fear of Clowns (2004)
- Hunting Humans (2002)
