= Miss America 2013 =

86th edition of the Miss America competition

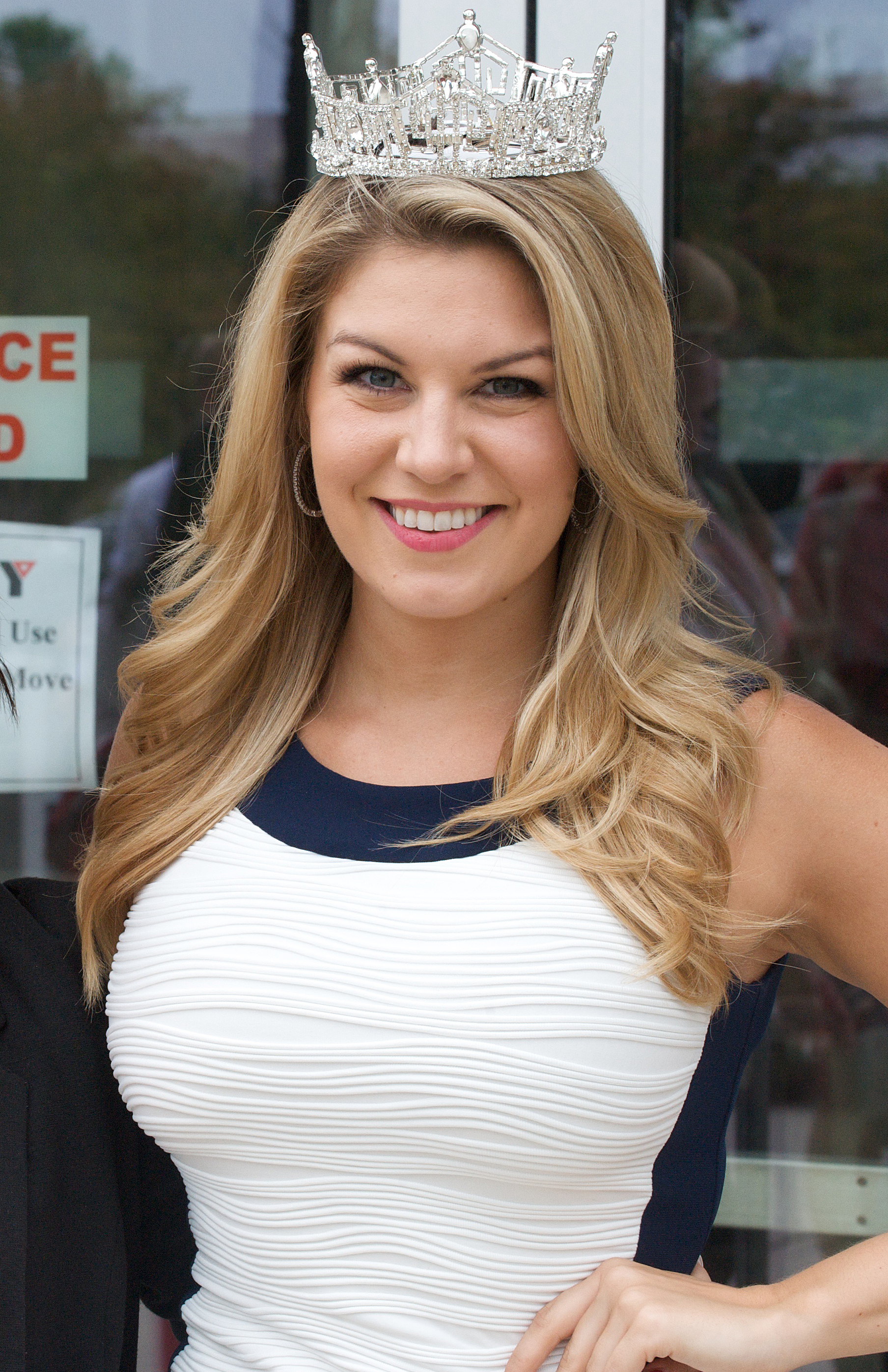
- Miss America 2013, Mallory Hagan, in 2013
- Date: January 12, 2013
- Presenters: Chris Harrison; Brooke Burke-Charvet
- Venue: PH Live, Paradise, Nevada, United States
- Broadcaster: ABC
- Entrants: 53
- Placements: 16
- Winner: Mallory Hagan; New York

Miss America 2013 was the 86th Miss America pageant, held at PH Live at Planet Hollywood Las Vegas in Las Vegas, Nevada, on January 12, 2013.

Laura Kaeppeler of Wisconsin crowned Mallory Hagan of New York as her successor at the end of the event.

== Results ==
=== Placements ===
| Placement | Contestant |
|---|---|
| Miss America 2013 | New York – Mallory Hagan |
| 1st Runner-Up | South Carolina – Ali Rogers |
| 2nd Runner-Up | Oklahoma – Alicia Clifton |
| 3rd Runner-Up | Wyoming – Lexie Madden |
| 4th Runner-Up | Iowa – Mariah Cary |
| Top 10 | Illinois – Megan Ervin; Maryland – Joanna Guy; Tennessee – Chandler Lawson; Texas – DaNae Couch; Washington – Mandy Schendel ** |
| Top 12 | Alabama – Anna Laura Bryan; Indiana – MerrieBeth Cox |
| Top 16 | Florida – Laura McKeeman; Kentucky – Jessica Casebolt; Montana – Alexis Wineman *; Utah – Kara Arnold |

* - America's Choice

** - Saved by judges to compete in final competition.

=== Awards ===
==== Preliminary awards ====
| Awards | Contestant |
|---|---|
| Lifestyle and Fitness | Illinois - Megan Ervin; South Carolina - Ali Rogers; (Washington (state)) Washington - Mandy Schendel |
| Talent | Maryland - Joanna Guy; North Dakota - Rosie Sauvageau; Oklahoma - Alicia Clifton |

==== Duke of Edinburgh awards ====
| Medal | Contestants |
|---|---|
| Gold | South Carolina - Ali Rogers |
| Silver | Alabama - Anna Laura Bryan; Louisiana - Lauren Vizza; Ohio - Elissa McCracken |
| Bronze | California - Leah Cecil; Connecticut - Emily Audibert; Florida - Laura McKeeman; (Georgia (U.S. state)) Georgia - Leighton Jordan; Mississippi - Marie Wicks; New Hampshire - Megan Lyman; North Carolina - Arlie Honeycutt; Oklahoma - Alicia Clifton; Pennsylvania - Jordyn Colao; Tennessee - Chandler Lawson; West Virginia - Kaitlin Gates |

== Judges ==
The seven judges for the competition were:

- Bradley Bayou, fashion designer
- Cheryl Burke, professional dancer
- Sam Champion, television weather anchor
- Mary Hart, television personality and Miss South Dakota 1970
- Daymond John, entrepreneur
- McKayla Maroney, Olympic gymnast
- Katie Stam Irk, Miss America 2009

== Contestants ==
The following contestants competed for the title.

| State/district/terr. | Name | Hometown | Age | Talent | Placement | Awards | Notes |
|---|---|---|---|---|---|---|---|
| Alabama | Anna Laura Bryan | Decatur | 23 | Vocal | Top 12 | | |
| Alaska | Debbe Ebben | Chugiak | 23 | Piano | | | |
| Arizona | Piper Stoeckel | Prescott | 23 | Dance | | | |
| Arkansas | Sloane Ashton Roberts | | | | | | |
| California | Leah Cecil | Garden Grove | 22 | Classical Harp | | | Contestant at National Sweetheart 2011 |
| Colorado | Hannah Porter | Centennial | 24 | Tap Dance | | | Top 10 at National Sweetheart 2011 |
| Connecticut | Emily Audibert | Wolcott | 21 | Lyrical Dance | | | |
| Delaware | Alyssa Murray | Selbyville | 20 | Jazz Dance | | | Previously Delaware's Junior Miss 2010 |
| (Washington, D.C.) District of Columbia | Allyn Rose | Washington, D.C. | 24 | Artistic Roller Skating | | | Previously Miss Maryland USA 2011; Top 8 at Miss USA 2011 pageant |
| Florida | Laura McKeeman | St. Petersburg | 24 | Ballet en Pointe | Top 16 | | Fox Sports College Football & Tampa Bay Rays Sideline Reporter |
| (Georgia (U.S. state)) Georgia | Leighton Jordan | Suwanee | 20 | Ballet en Pointe | | | |
| Hawaii | Skyler Kamaka | Kaneohe | 21 | Hula | | | |
| Idaho | Whitney Wood | Idaho Falls | 19 | Piano | | | |
| Illinois | Megan Jo Ervin | Kushville | 23 | Contemporary Dance | Top 10 | | Contestant at National Sweetheart 2011 |
| Indiana | MerrieBeth Cox | Roselle, IL | 22 | Baton Twirling | Top 12 | | Previously Miss Illinois' Outstanding Teen 2007 Purdue University's Golden Girl |
| Iowa | Mariah Noel Cary | Muscatine | 20 | Tap Dance | 4th runner-up | | Previously Little Miss Iowa Previously Junior Miss Iowa |
| Kansas | Sloane Lewis | Norwich | 21 | Piano | | | |
| Kentucky | Jessica Casebolt | Pikeville | 20 | Vocal | Top 16 | | |
| Louisiana | Lauren Vizza | Shreveport | 22 | Dance | | | Later Miss Louisiana USA 2018 |
| Maine | Molly Bouchard | Caribou | 21 | Classical Vocal | | | Previously Maine's Junior Miss 2008 |
| Maryland | Joanna Guy3rd runner-up at Miss America's Outstanding Teen 2009 pageant | | | | | | |
| Massachusetts | Taylor Kinzler | Lakeville | 20 | Vocal | | | Previously Miss Massachusetts' Outstanding Teen 2008 Contestant at National Sweetheart 2010 |
| Michigan | Angela Christine Venditti | Shelby Township | 24 | Tap Dance | | | |
| Minnesota | Siri Joy Freeh | Lake Park | 23 | Lyrical Dance | | | |
| Mississippi | Marie Wicks | Ocean Springs | 23 | Piano | | | |
| Missouri | Chelsea (Tippe) Tipton Emmott | Branson/Springfield | 22 | Ballet en Pointe | | | 1st runner-up at National Sweetheart 2011 |
| Montana | Alexis Wineman | Cut Bank | 18 | Comedic Monologue | Top 16 | | First contestant diagnosed with autism |
| Nebraska | Mariah Cook | Chadron | 23 | Piano | | | |
| Nevada | Randi Sundquist | Elko | 23 | Contemporary Jazz | | | |
| New Hampshire | Megan Lyman Contestant at National Sweetheart 2010 | | | | | | |
| New Jersey | Lindsey Petrosh | Egg Harbor City | 23 | Vocal | | | Previously Miss New Jersey's Outstanding Teen 2006 |
| New Mexico | Candice Bennatt | Reidoso | 23 | Contemporary Jazz | | | Later Miss Louisiana USA 2015 |
| (New York (state)) New York | Mallory Hytes Hagan | Brooklyn/Opelika | 24 | Tap Dance | Miss America 2013 | | |
| North Carolina | Arlie Honeycutt | Garner | 20 | Vocal | | | |
| North Dakota | Rosie Sauvageau | Fargo | 24 | Vocal and Piano | | | |
| Ohio | Elissa McCracken | Ada | 21 | Piano | | | |
| Oklahoma | Alicia Tammy CliftonTop 10 at Miss America's Outstanding Teen 2009 pageant | | | | | | |
| Oregon | Nichole Mead | Newport | 24 | Contemporary Dance | | | Contestant at National Sweetheart 2011 |
| Pennsylvania | Jordyn Colao | Millcreek Township | 22 | Tap Dance | | | |
| Puerto Rico | Kiaraliz Medina | Moca | 20 | Flamenco Dancing | | | |
| Rhode Island | Kelsey Fournier | Pawtucket | 23 | Jazz Dance | | | NFL Cheerleader for the New England Patriots |
| South Carolina | Ali RogersTop 10 at Miss America's Outstanding Teen 2010 pageant | | | | | | |
| South Dakota | Calista Kirby | Brookings | 24 | Tumbling | | | Contestant at National Sweetheart 2011 |
| Tennessee | Chandler Lawson | Chattanooga | 22 | Vocal | Top 10 | | Previously Tennessee's Junior Miss 2008 Contestant at National Sweetheart 2011 |
| Texas | DaNae Elizabeth Couch | Coppell | 24 | Twirling | Top 10 | | |
| Utah | Kara Arnold | Bountiful | 22 | Piano | Top 16 | | |
| Vermont | Chelsea Ingram | St. Johnsbury | 23 | Opera | | | |
| (United States Virgin Islands) Virgin Islands | Aniska Tonge | Saint Thomas | 21 | Vocal | | | Later Miss World US Virgin Islands 2014 and Miss Universe US Virgin Islands 2018. Unplaced at both Miss World 2014 and Miss Universe 2018. |
| Virginia | Rosemary Willis | Chesapeake | 22 | Vocal | | | |
| (Washington (state)) Washington | Mandy Schendel | | | | | | |
| West Virginia | Kaitlin Gates | Bridgeport | 20 | Vocal | | | Previously Miss West Virginia's Outstanding Teen 2006 |
| Wisconsin | Kathryn Bess Gorman | Onalaska | 23 | Vocal | | | |
| Wyoming | Lexie Madden | Torrington | 21 | Piano | 3rd runner-up | | Previously Wyoming's Junior Miss 2009 |

== Replacements ==
- Miss Oregon - Nichole Mead was originally the first runner-up but later was crowned Miss Oregon 2012 to replace the original winner, Rachel Berry, who resigned due to concerns over length of residency.
