= Fear of Clowns 2 =

- Movie poster
- Directed by: Kevin Kangas
- Written by: Kevin Kangas
- Starring: Jacky Reres; Mark Lassise; Frank A. Lama; Johnny Alonso; Phillip Levine; Clarence McNatt; Vincent T. Brown; Adam Ciesielski; Lars Stevens; Savannah Costello; Leanna Chamish
- Release date: September 18, 2007
- Running time: 107 minutes
- Language: English

Fear of Clowns 2 is a 2007 American horror film written and directed by Kevin Kangas. It is a sequel to Fear of Clowns (2004) and takes place two years after the events of the original and continues the story of a young woman (Jacky Reres) getting stalked by a killer clown (Mark Lassise).

The movie was produced by Marauder Productions, in association with Kangas Kahn Films and distributed by Lions Gate Films Home Entertainment

== Plot ==
The film begins two years after the events of the first film, with Detective Peters at the doctor's office, who reveals to Peters that he has Creutzfeldt–Jakob disease (CJD), and there is no treatment; it's fatal.

Two months later, it is revealed that after being sent to jail two years ago, Doug Richardson a.k.a. "Shivers the Clown" was sent to a mental asylum, and Lynn Blodgett has quit her painting career and gone on to write a book called Coulrophobia, which talks about her fear of clowns and the story about the stalking killer clown two years ago; she and Tucker Reid have broken up and haven't seen each other for a while.

But things go terribly wrong: An orderly named Ralph helps Shivers and two other inmates escape the asylum. Shivers takes Ralph and the inmates back to his old house, which is now occupied by a junkie, who is later strangled to death by Shivers. The next day, after hearing of Shiver's escape, Lynn calls Detective Peters and tells him that she will be home soon. Meanwhile, the junkie's friends arrive at the house, only to be killed by the inmates, Giggles the Clown and Ogre the Clown.

Meanwhile, Lynn arrives back home and meets Detective Peters at a restaurant, where he reveals that he's going to kill Doug Richardson. As Detective Peters takes Lynn home, they find out that Shivers has just killed Tucker outside an amusement park, where Tucker was constructing a new design for a roller coaster. Peters then calls two police officers to guard Lynn's house before they leave at 9:00 to secluded cabins in the woods. Before they leave, Ogre kills the police officers, while Shivers tries to kill Lynn. But during the process, Shivers kills Giggles instead.

Peters and Lynn escape through the cellar, while Shivers takes off in the van (where Ralph is handcuffed), leaving Ogre behind to mourn over Giggle's dead body, as he was Ogre's best friend. Ogre then takes off to go after Shivers for revenge. The next day, Peters and Lynn arrive at the cabins, where they are greeted by Hot Rod, Stoltz, and Rego, who are all friends of Peters. Meanwhile, Shivers leaves Ralph in the van while he goes to the bathroom, and Ralph calls an anonymous person, telling him that he needs to pay him (Ralph) more money if he (the caller) wants the job to be done. Then, Shivers leaves to go find Lynn, only to end up at the Horner's home, killing the entire family. Shivers then continues on to find the cabins.

Peters goes outside to see if the coast is clear, only to be axed in the side. Lynn takes off into the woods with Shivers on her tail, leaving the axe inside Peters. Peters, who is still alive, reloads his gun and drags himself to where Lynn and Shivers ran off to. Peters finds them, and shoots Shivers two times: once in the hand, the other in the back, and Shivers falls into a gully. Lynn goes to check to see if Peters is okay, but looks to see Shivers rise up out of the gully. Lynn takes Peter's gun and points it at Shivers, but before she can pull the trigger, Stoltz (who was only injured in the face) pops out of nowhere and shoots Shivers three times in the chest, knocking him back into the gully. It is never revealed whether Peters is dead, or he's just simply unconscious.

The police arrive, only to find out that there's no body in the gully, only that there is a trail of blood that leads a hundred feet south, where Shivers climbed out of the gully and went into the woods. Sgt. Raup (Vincent T. Brown) decides to break the news to Lynn in the morning after she gets a good night sleep. The ending leaves it ambiguous as to whether Shivers is alive, or he died after heading out into the woods.

== Cast ==
- Jacky Reres as Lynn Blodgett
- Mark Lassise as Shivers The Clown
- Frank A. Lama as Detective Peters
- Tom Proctor as Rego
- Phillip Levine as Giggles The Clown
- Clarence McNatt as Ogre The Clown
- Johnny Alonso as Ralph
- Adam Ciesielski as Hot Rod
- Savannah Costello as Maggie
- Lars Stevens as Stoltz
- Leanna Chamish as Carol
- John C. Bailey as Doctor Jones
- Vincent T. Brown as Sgt. Raup
- Dave "Bullet" Wooters as Old Man Horner
- Michelle Trout as Mrs. Horner
- Mike Baldwin as Craig
- Chris O'Brocki as Owen
- Jay McCarey as Officer Ripley
- Rob Stull as Officer Rickenhouse
- Steve Carson as Officer Stewie

== Reception ==
Steve Pattee from HorrorTalk.com awarded the film 3.5/5 stars, writing, "With Fear of Clowns 2, Kevin Kangas has pulled off something that is pretty damn hard to do — he made a sequel that is better than the original... It's got more action, more tension, stronger acting and a killer score. And if one were to judge by the applause and hoots and hollers from the audience, he's got himself a winner." Fangoria noted that the film was an improvement of the first film, with steadier performances and creepy imagery. However, they criticized the ending as "dissatisfying", and felt that some scenes were drawn out too much.
