= Fear of Clowns =

- Film poster
- Directed by: Kevin Kangas
- Written by: Kevin Kangas
- Produced by: Rick Ganz; Kevin Kangas
- Starring: Rick Ganz; Mark Lassise; Jacqueline Reres
- Cinematography: David Mun
- Edited by: Harvey Glatman
- Music by: Chad Seiter
- Production companies: Kangas Kahn Films; Marauder Productions
- Distributed by: Lionsgate
- Release dates: October 28, 2004 (Baltimore, Maryland)
- Running time: 120 minutes
- Country: United States
- Language: English

Fear of Clowns is a 2004 horror film written and directed by Kevin Kangas. The film centres on an artist who is struggling with a hostile spouse and becomes the object of a mentally disturbed clown. It was followed by a 2007 sequel entitled Fear of Clowns 2.

== Plot ==
Lynn Blodgett, an artist with coulrophobia, has a nightmare in which she is a young girl and encounters a clown with a decomposing face after a car crash at a carnival. Lynn's nightmares have been getting worse since she filed for divorce from her husband, Doctor Bert Tokyo, who hit her upon getting the news, and is fighting for full custody of their son, Nicholas. One night, a shirtless clown (Shivers) with black eyes and a battle axe gazes at Lynn's house, then walks away. In the morning, Lynn is told that a family living near where she was house sitting was massacred.

At a gallery exhibiting her work, most of which involves monstrous clowns, Lynn meets Tucker Reid, a roller coaster tycoon who purchases one of her paintings for $8000. Tuck invites Lynn to his office, and after the tour, the two are attacked by a mugger, Heston, but escape. Lynn is shaken by the attempted robbery, but brushes off Tuck's offer to stay at her house. Lynn answers a call from the gallery owner and faints after spotting Shivers standing on her patio. The gallery owner then calls the police, who later question Lynn and dismiss her story.

At the gallery, Lynn reluctantly accepts an offer of $20,000 to do a portrait of a man's father, a clown and convicted child molester. Elsewhere, Shivers is tormented by voices, which tell him that he will get better if he continues to terrorize Lynn. Lynn meets with Bert and his lawyer, who state that Bert not only wants custody of Nicholas, but also wants child support, and half the rights and profits to all the paintings that Lynn has created and sold since they married. It is also revealed that Bert has been out of work for six months, and has been lying about being preoccupied with his job.

Shivers stalks Lynn as she is walking with Tuck, and later murders Lynn's friend Amanda. Lynn is contacted by Detective Peters, who tells her about Amanda's death, and that he now believes her story about being scared by a clown, as grease paint was found under Amanda's nails, and in a colorful pattern on one of her windows. In a parking lot, Bert meets with Heston, who he has hired to kill Lynn so he can collect life insurance. Heston successfully badgers Bert into giving him more money, due to the complications caused by Shivers and the police. Bert visits Shivers, who is revealed to be Doug Richardson, a former patient of his, a sex offender with Leber's congenital amaurosis. Worried that Shivers will wreck his plans, Bert orders him to leave Lynn alone.

Ignoring Bert, Shivers sends a party clown to Lynn's house to distract the guard, whom he beheads, spotting Heston nearby as he does so. When Shivers leaves, Heston breaks into Lynn's home, and is shot with his own gun during a struggle with Lynn and Tuck, who had stopped by to check on Lynn. At the Tokyo residence, Shivers murders Bert, due to Bert trying to have Heston assassinate Lynn, and thus almost ruining Shivers's chance to be "cured". While the authorities are content with believing that Heston was Shivers, Lynn is unconvinced. Nevertheless, she decides to go out on a date to a theatre with Tuck to celebrate being paid $100,000 for the painting she was hired to do.

Shivers continues his mission of trying to rid himself of his schizophrenia through Lynn. He kills her boss, abducts Nicholas after dismembering his babysitter, and breaks into the theatre, where he butchers two employees. As Shivers pursues Lynn and Tuck, Detective Peters races to the theatre, having gotten an alert about a 911 call from it, and news that the DNA under Amanda's fingernails matches Doug. Shivers uses Nicholas to lure Lynn out, and as the clown is about to kill her, Tuck blinds him from a projectionist booth, incapacitating him long enough for Peters and other officers to arrive, and arrest him.

Lynn goes home, and has a nightmare about Shivers escaping from prison, and attacking her and Nicholas.

== Cast ==
- Rick Ganz as Tucker Reid
- Jacqueline Reres as Lynn Blodgett
  - Samantha Koehler as Young Lynn Blodgett
- Mark Lassise as Doug Richardson/Shivers the Clown
- Carl Randolph as Doctor Bert Tokyo
- Frank Lama as Detective Peters
- Ted Taylor as Heston
- John Patrick Barry as Officer Patrick
- Andrew Schneider as Phillip
- Lauren Pellegrino as Amanda Green
- Lisa Willis Brush as Julie
- Christopher Lee Philips as Osbourne
- Judith Furlow as Gale Wroten
- Patrick T. McGowan as Endle Parrish
- Jack-Joseph Porter as Nicholas Blodgett
- Kevin Kangas as Cop

== Release ==
Fear of Clowns made its DVD debut on February 28, 2006, when it was released by Live/Artisan. The release was a financial success, grossing over $3 million in rentals within its first six months of release.

== Reception ==
Critical reception for Fear of Clowns has been mixed to negative, with most criticism directed towards the film's thin characters, screenplay, and Kangas' direction. Although they would commend Lassise and Reres' performances, Bloody Disgusting noted that, overall, the film's one-dimensional characters, poor pacing, and runtime. Dread Central's Steve Barton felt Lassise's Shivers the Clown was "the most memorable murderer—in years", while noting the weak story, and lack of interesting characters. Andre Manseau of Joblo's Arrow in the Head criticized the film for its thin and poorly written characters, which he felt ruined an otherwise interesting concept and admittedly creepy clown design. Reviewing the film and its sequel, Ain't It Cool News felt that the film's pacing would have benefited with a shorter runtime, while noting the clown designs as "downright terrifying".

== Legacy ==
Fear of Clowns's financial success would help spawn a sequel Fear of Clowns 2, also directed by Kangas, three years later. Shivers the Clown would later be included in Variety's "The 20 Creepiest Clowns in Movies and TV". On the character, the author would said "Shivers himself is an undeniably creepy figure whose asymmetrical grin hints at the diseased mind lurking beneath the makeup".
