= Joanna Guy =

Beauty pageant winner

Joanna Guy (born August 4, 1991) is a former Miss Maryland titleholder and Miss America Competition 2013 Top 10 Finalist and Talent Award winner.

A Cornell University graduate, (government major; music minor) from Swanton, Maryland, she earned an MBA from the Fuqua School of Business at Duke University.

Awards and achievements
Preceded by Carlie Colella	Miss Maryland; 2012	Succeeded by Christina Denny
Preceded by Kasey Stanizewski	Miss Maryland's Outstanding Teen; 2008	Succeeded by Stephanie Meadowcroft
