= Maryland Theatre (Hagerstown) =

- U.S. National Register of Historic Places
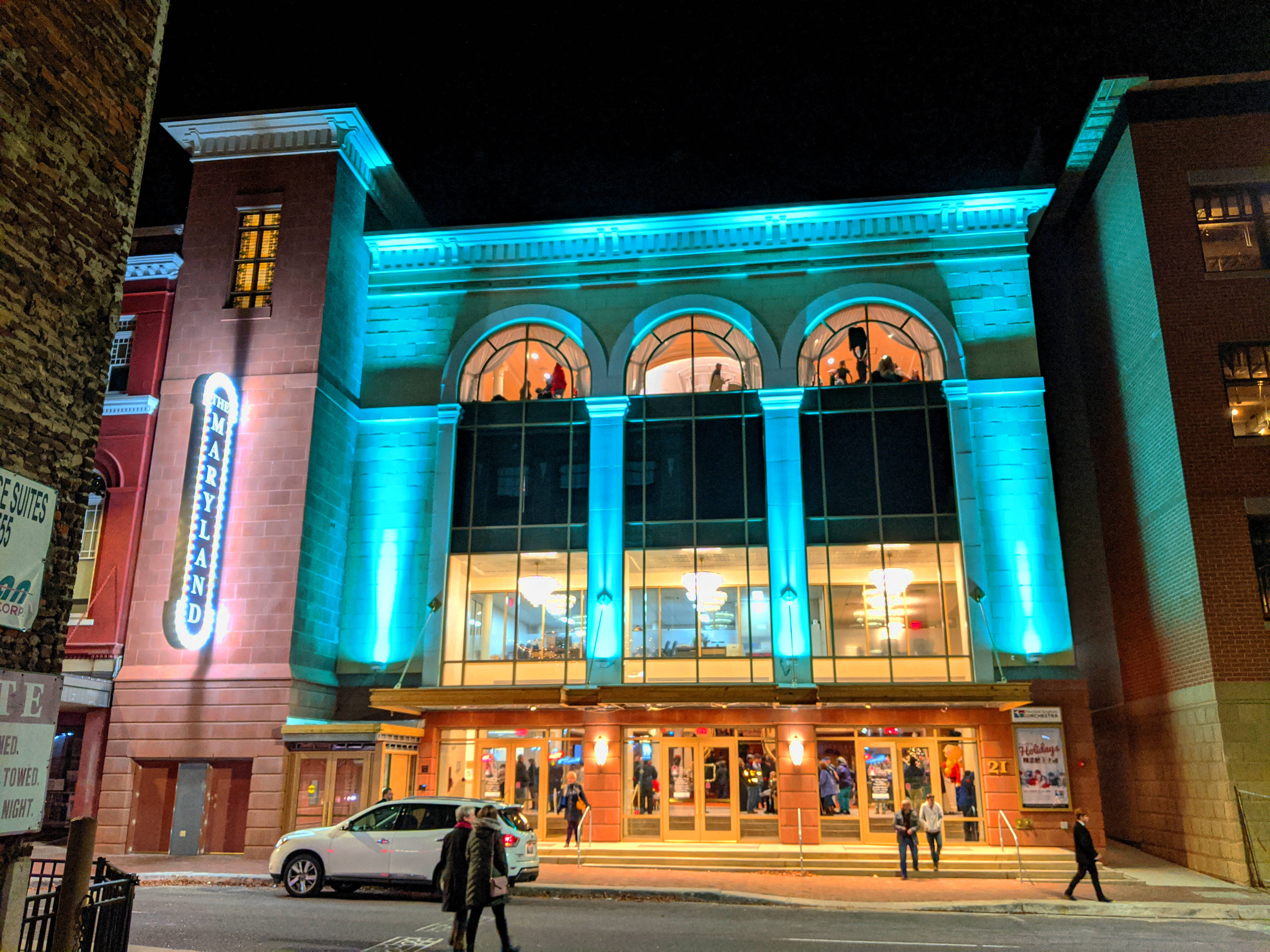
- The Maryland Theatre in December 2019

- Location within Maryland Location within the United States
- Location: 21–23 S. Potomac St., Hagerstown, Maryland
- Coordinates: 39°38′29″N 77°43′17″W
- Built: 1915
- Architect: Thomas W. Lamb, Harry E. Yessler
- NRHP reference No.: 76001015
- Added to NRHP: November 13, 1976

The Maryland Theatre is a music and entertainment venue located in the Arts and Entertainment District of downtown Hagerstown, Maryland. It was built in 1915, partially destroyed by fire in 1974, reopened in 1978, and expanded into a full performing arts complex in 2019. The theatre's seating capacity is 1,279 people, and it hosts performances of symphony orchestras, country artists, comedians, children's shows, pop stars, recitals, stage shows, and others. Over 81,000 patrons attended performances at the Maryland Theatre in 2005, making it one of Maryland's premier venues for the performing arts. The Maryland Symphony Orchestra performs there regularly and has been headquartered in the building since 2019. The theater features a fully restored Wurlitzer theatre organ.

== Description ==
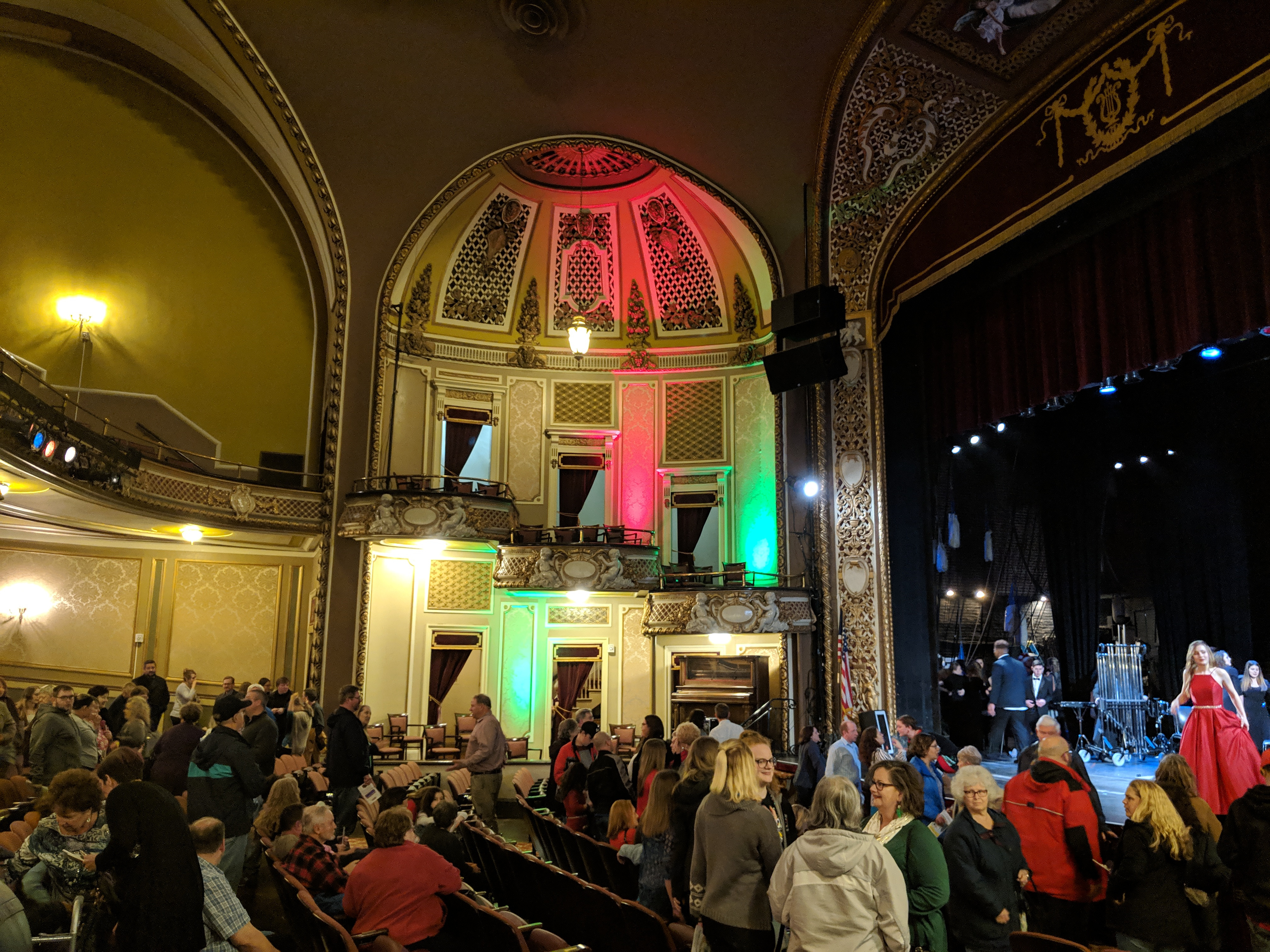
The 1915 theater house

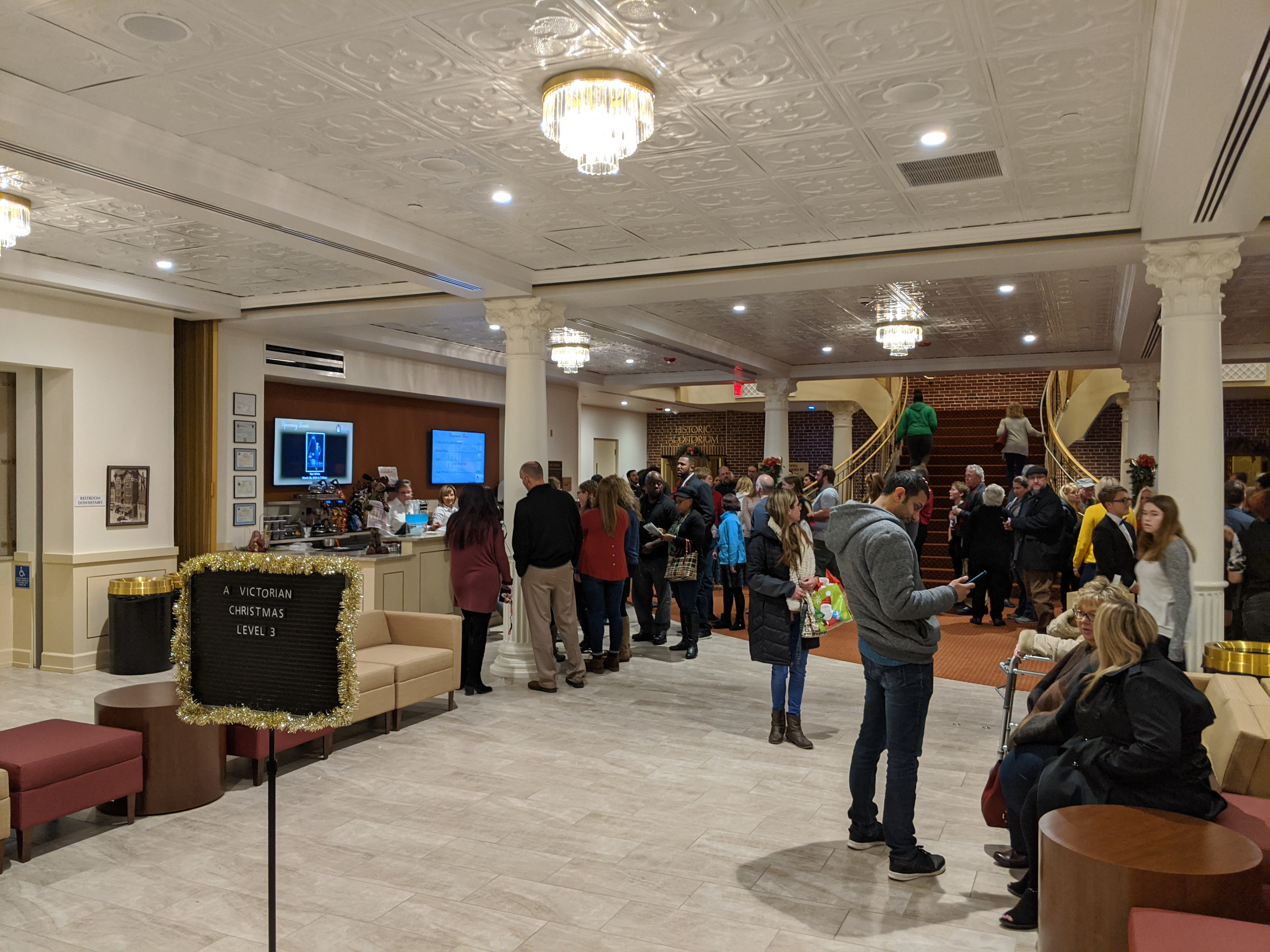
The lobby during intermission in December 2019

The Maryland Theatre was designed by architect Harry E. Yessler of Hagerstown, in association with prominent theater architect Thomas W. Lamb of New York. Interior design was by Arthur Brounet of New York. The contractor was George Wolfe of Hagerstown.

The original facade of the theater at 21-25 South Potomac Street was a five-story apartment block. The theater occupies the interior of the first block of South Potomac Street, and was originally entered through the ground floor of the apartments. The chief character of the theater, even prior to the 1974 fire that destroyed the front block and main lobby, was to be found in its interior. The interior is primarily neoclassical in character, with Art Deco influences. The house features a prominent proscenium arch framing the stage house. The auditorium has three boxes on either side of the auditorium level and three to each side on the balcony level, set in an arched niche. The small interior lobby is restrained in its detailing, with a grand stair from the main level to the balcony level. A smaller stair continues to the upper balcony. The current lobby, finished in 2019, spans nearly the full width of the theater and contains the box office, a concession stand, a seating area, two entrances to the main level of the theater house, and a grand stair that diverges at a landing. The upstairs level has two entrances into the balcony level of the theater and a second concession stand and cocktail bar with cafe seating. Another staircase connects the main floor to the basement level, with another seating area and more restrooms.

== History ==
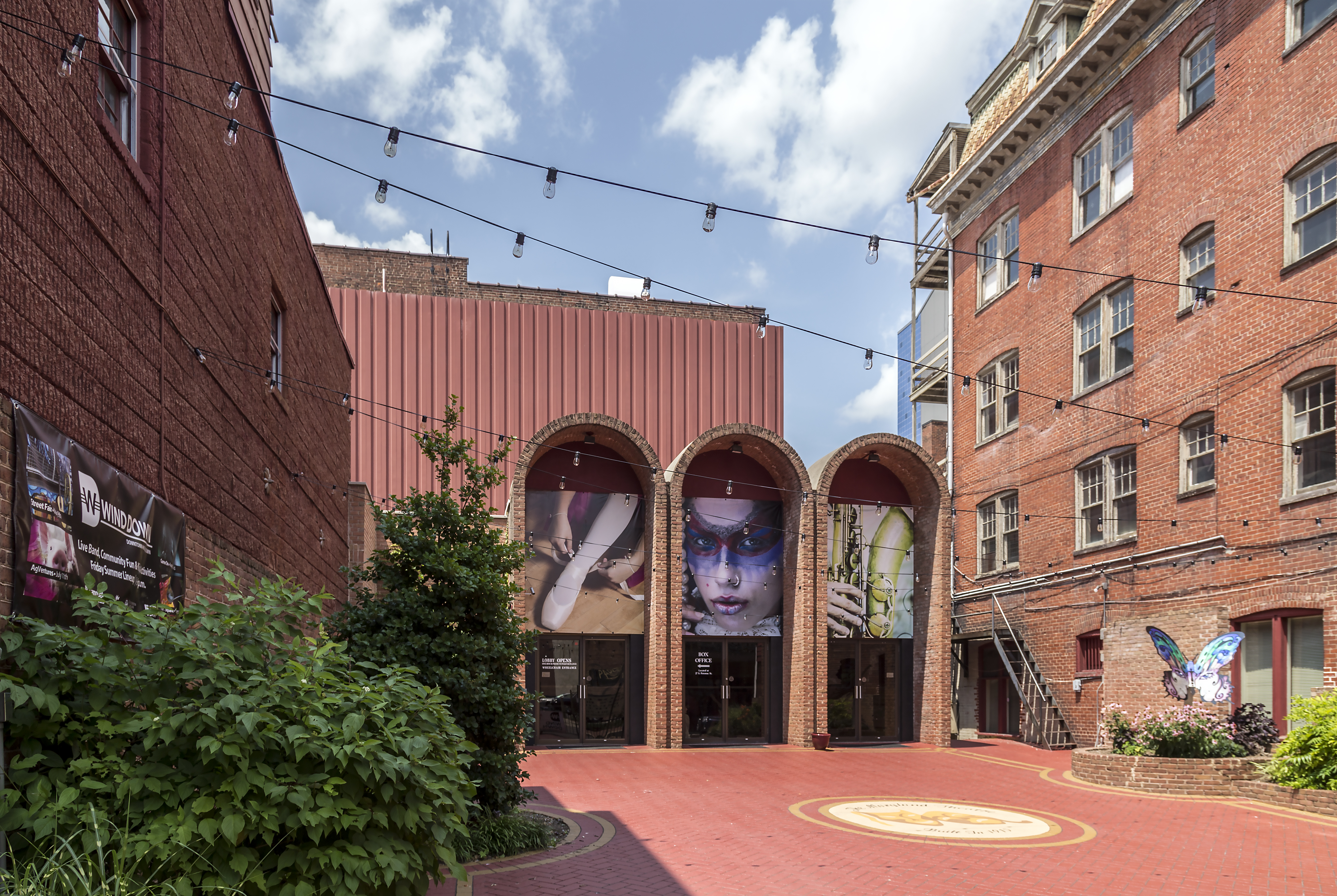
The entrance as it appeared between 1978 and 2018. The wall on the left belongs to the McBare Building, which was part of the Theatre's lobby. The building on the right was demolished in 2019 to expand the Barbara Ingram School for the Arts.

The Maryland Theatre opened on May 10, 1915, with live performances, including the Tiller Sisters, a singing and dancing act called "The Big Surprise", and the Guzmania Trio of acrobats. This was followed by a movie, The Commuters. The Maryland Theatre operated until November 1973. A February 8, 1974 fire destroyed the front block, which was demolished. In 1978, the front was converted into a courtyard plaza and a new, smaller lobby was constructed for the reopening. In 1994, a portion of the film Guarding Tess featuring Nicolas Cage and Shirley MacLaine was filmed inside the theatre.

In 2010, the Maryland Theatre acquired the McBare Building, a three-story Italianate commercial building located partially in front of the theater, to expand its office and lobby space. The concession stand was located in the main floor of the McBare Building until 2018.

The Maryland Theatre's interior was listed on the National Register of Historic Places in 1976.

=== 2019 expansion and new lobby ===
In 2018, the 1978 lobby, the McBare Building, and the courtyard were demolished to begin an expansion of the Theatre into a Performing Arts Complex, finished and opened in October 2019. The complex contains an expansive lobby, a cocktail lounge, offices for the Maryland Symphony Orchestra, a VIP suite, a rehearsal stage, and a ballroom. This expansion accompanied the expansion of the adjacent Barbara Ingram School for the Arts. The project was designed by Grimm + Parker Architects.

== See also ==
- List of concert halls
