= Swanton, Maryland =

- Census-designated place
- Location within Maryland Location within the United States
- Coordinates: 39°27′36″N 79°13′58″W
- Country: United States
- State: Maryland
- County: Garrett

Area
  - Total: 0.38 sq mi (0.99 km^{2})
  - Land: 0.38 sq mi (0.99 km^{2})
  - Water: 0 sq mi (0.00 km^{2})
- Elevation: 2,310 ft (700 m)

Population (2020)
  - Total: 66
  - Density: 172.2/sq mi (66.47/km^{2})
- Time zone: UTC−5 (Eastern (EST))
  - Summer (DST): UTC−4 (EDT)
- ZIP code: 21561
- FIPS code: 24-76450
- GNIS feature ID: 2583693

Swanton is an unincorporated area and census-designated place (CDP) in Garrett County, Maryland, United States. Swanton is home to Deep Creek Lake State Park and many private homes on or near Deep Creek Lake. Additionally, Swanton is local to Wisp Ski Resort and close to several other recreation areas, such as Jennings Randolph Lake and Ohiopyle State Park.A church and a post office are located in the downtown area.

Anderson Chapel was listed on the National Register of Historic Places in 1984.

== Demographics ==
Historical population
Census	Pop.	Note	%±
2010	58		—
2020	66		13.8%
U.S. Decennial Census
