= Miss America 2008 =

81st edition of the Miss America competition

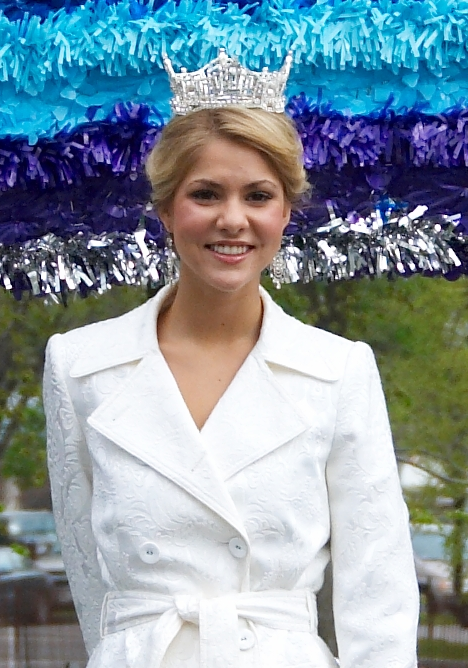
- Kirsten Haglund, Miss America 2008, at the Cherry Blossom Festival
- Date: January 26, 2008
- Presenters: Mark Steines
- Venue: Planet Hollywood Theatre for the Performing Arts, Las Vegas, Nevada
- Broadcaster: TLC
- Entrants: 53
- Placements: 16
- Winner: Kirsten Haglund; Michigan

Miss America 2008, the 81st Miss America pageant, was held on the Las Vegas Strip in Paradise, Nevada, on Saturday, January 26, 2008.

The pageant was broadcast live on TLC from the Theatre for the Performing Arts at the Planet Hollywood Resort and Casino, only the third time that the pageant had been held outside Atlantic City.

Kirsten Haglund (Michigan) was crowned Miss America 2008 by Miss America 2007, Lauren Nelson.

== Miss America: Reality Check ==
The pageant's new network, TLC, premiered a four-week reality competition, titled Miss America: Reality Check, on January 4, 2008, hosted by Ugly Betty actor Michael Urie. The premise of the show is to show the contestants preparing for the pageant and to update the image of the Miss America pageant, which had seen a decline in popularity over the last few decades. In addition, viewers were able to vote online and choose one of the delegates to be a finalist in the pageant.

== Judges ==
The seven judges for the competition were fashion designer Trace Ayala, magazine editor Sarah Ivens, Olympic athlete and gold medalist Jackie Joyner-Kersee, casting director Jason La Padura, personal trainer Kim Lyons, television news anchor Robin Meade, and motivational speaker James Arthur Ray.

== Results ==
=== Placements ===
Placement	Contestant
Miss America 2008	Michigan – Kirsten Haglund
1st Runner-Up	Indiana – Nicole Rash
2nd Runner-Up	Washington – Elyse Umemoto
3rd Runner-Up	Virginia – Hannah Kiefer
4th Runner-Up	North Carolina – Jessica Jacobs
Top 8	California – Melissa Chaty; Texas – Molly Hazlett; Wisconsin – Christina Thompson
Top 10	Georgia – Leah Massee; Iowa – Diana Reed
Top 16	Arkansas – Katie Bailey; Florida – Kylie Williams; Mississippi – Kimberly Morgan; South Carolina – Crystal Garrett; Tennessee – Grace Gore; Utah – Jill Stevens §

§ – America's Choice

=== Awards ===
==== Preliminary awards ====
Awards	Contestant
Lifestyle and Fitness	Michigan – Kirsten Haglund; Rhode Island – Ashley Bickford; Texas – Molly Hazlett
Talent	Connecticut – Dana Daunis; Iowa – Diana Reed; Massachusetts – Valerie Amaral

==== Quality of Life award ====
Results	Contestant	Platform
Winner	Nevada – Caleche Manos	M.A.D.D. – Prevention of Drinking and Driving Through Education
1st runner-up	Florida – Kylie Williams	-
2nd runner-up	Oklahoma –– Makenna Smith	-
Finalists	Alabama – Jamie Langley; Massachusetts – Valerie Amaral; Minnesota – Jennifer Hudspeth; North Carolina – Jessica Jacobs; Rhode Island – Ashley Bickford; Tennessee – Grace Gore	Various

==== Other awards ====
Awards	Contestant
Miss Congeniality	North Dakota – Ashley Young
Non-finalist Talent	Connecticut – Dana Daunis; (Washington, D.C.) District of Columbia – Shayna Rudd; Idaho – Sadie Quigley; Massachusetts – Valerie Amaral; New Jersey – Amy Polumbo; Oregon – Kari Virding; Pennsylvania – Rachel Brooks
Pyramid Scholarship for Public Relations & Marketing	New Hampshire – Rachel Barker

== Delegates ==
State/district	Name	Hometown	Age (Note: Ages at the time of national competition)	Talent	Placement	Special awards	Notes
Alabama	Jamie Langley	Wadley	24	Vocal, "Listen"		CMN Miracle Maker Award 2nd runner-up Quality of Life Award Finalist	
Alaska	Cari Leyva	Anchorage	23	Vocal, "Habanera" from Carmen			Previously Miss Alaska USA 2004
Arizona	Nicole Turner	Phoenix	24	Jazz Dance, "Proud Mary"			
Arkansas	Katie Bailey	Conway	25	Vocal, "Feeling Good"	Top 16		
California	Melissa Chaty	Ukiah	23	Operatic Vocal, "The Jewel Song" from Faust	Top 8		Previously Miss Teenage California 2003
Colorado	Maggie Ireland	Littleton	22	Irish Step Dance, "Dueling Violins" & "Footloose"			
Connecticut	Dana Daunis	Watertown	22	Vocal, "Let Him Fly"		Non-finalist Talent Award Preliminary Talent Award	Contestant at National Sweetheart 2006 pageant
Delaware	Brittany Dempsey	Dover	20	Jazz Dance, "Rhythm of the Night"			Previously Delaware's Junior Miss 2005
District of Columbia	Shayna Rudd	Philadelphia	22	Jazz Dance, "Feeling Good"		Non-finalist Talent Award	
Florida	Kylie Williams	Jasper	24	Country Vocal, "I Want to Be a Cowboy's Sweetheart"	Top 16	Quality of Life Award 1st runner-up	
Georgia	Leah Massee	Fitzgerald	22	Vocal, "If I Had My Way"	Top 10		
Hawaii	Ashley Layfield	Kane'ohe	21	Lyrical Dance, "Listen" from Dreamgirls			Sister of Miss Hawaii USA 2008, Jonelle Layfield 2nd runner-up in Miss New York USA 2012 and 2013 pageants
Idaho	Sadie Quigley	Idaho Falls	19	Piano, "Devilish Inspiration, Op. 4, No. 4" by Sergei Prokofiev		Non-finalist Talent Award	
Illinois	Ashley Hatfield	Anna	24	Vocal, "To Love You More"			
Indiana	Nicole Rash	Plymouth	23	Vocal, "Bandito"	1st runner-up		Top 10 at National Sweetheart 2006 pageant Later Ms. America 2012 Later Mrs. America 2018 (under married name, Nicole Cook); Top 6 at Mrs. World 2018 pageant
Iowa	Diana Reed	Norwalk	23	Baton, "You Can't Stop the Beat" from Hairspray	Top 10	Preliminary Talent Award	
Kansas	Alyssa George	Minneapolis	21	Classical Piano			
Kentucky	Kaitlynne Postel	Lexington	21	Vocal, "So Much Better" from Legally Blonde			Daughter of Miss Maryland 1982, Lynne Graham Postel
Louisiana	Amanda Joseph	Pineville	21	Ballet en Pointe, "Canned Heat"			
Maine	Tara Allain	Biddeford	22	Dance, "Hangin' By a Thread"			
Maryland	Shana Powell	Bowie	22	Classical Vocal, "Glitter and Be Gay" from Candide			
Massachusetts	Valerie Amaral	Acushnet	22	Vocal, "Anyway"		CMN Miracle Maker Award Non-finalist Talent Award Preliminary Talent Award Quality of Life Award Finalist	Previously Miss Massachusetts' Outstanding Teen 2001 Contestant at National Sweetheart 2006 pageant
Michigan	Kirsten Haglund	Farmington Hills	19	Vocal, "Over the Rainbow"	Winner	Preliminary Lifestyle & Fitness Award	Granddaughter of Miss Detroit 1944, Iora June Victor
Minnesota	Jennifer Hudspeth	Apple Valley	23	Vocal, "Life of the Party" from The Wild Party		Quality of Life Award Finalist	
Mississippi	Kimberly Morgan	Taylor	24	Vocal, "God Bless the Child"	Top 16		
Missouri	Lindsay Casmaer	Florissant	24	Ballet en Pointe, "Piano Fantasy"			
Montana	Kristen Mantooth	Lewistown	22	Lyrical Dance, "Beauty from Pain"			
Nebraska	Ashley Bauer	Scottsbluff	21	Vocal, "This Is My Life"'			Contestant at National Sweetheart 2006 pageant
Nevada	Caleche Manos	Reno	23	Vocal, "Love Is a Battlefield"		Quality of Life Award	Contestant at National Sweetheart 2006 pageant
New Hampshire	Rachel Barker	Amherst	20	Ballet en Pointe, "Someone Like You" from Jekyll & Hyde		Pyramid Scholarship for Public Relations & Marketing	
New Jersey	Amy Polumbo	Howell	22	Vocal, "Astonishing" from Little Women		Non-finalist Talent Award	
New Mexico	Jenny Marlowe	Albuquerque	23	Vocal, "Born For This"			
New York	Elisabeth Baldanza	Oneonta	23	Contemporary Ballet, "Your Daddy's Son" from Ragtime			
North Carolina	Jessica Jacobs	High Point	23	Ballet en pointe, "Spring" from The Four Seasons	4th runner-up	Quality of Life Award Finalist	
North Dakota	Ashley Young	Grand Forks	20	Classical Vocal, "Adele's Laughing Song" from Die Fledermaus		Miss Congeniality	
Ohio	Roberta Camp	Grove City	23	Vocal, "Blessed"			Top 15 Miss Ohio USA 2006
Oklahoma	Makenna Smith	Oklahoma City	24	Vocal, "Wheels of a Dream" from Ragtime		Quality of Life Award 2nd runner-up	
Oregon	Kari Virding	Portland	24	Vocal, "The Girl in 14G"		Non-finalist Talent Award	Previously Miss Oregon Teen USA 2000
Pennsylvania	Rachel Brooks	Broomall	24	Vocal, "Summertime"		Non-finalist Talent Award	
Rhode Island	Ashley Bickford	Newport	22	Ballet en Pointe		Miss Photogenic Preliminary Lifestyle & Fitness Award Quality of Life Award Finalist	Previously Miss Connecticut Teen USA 2002; Top 10 at Miss Teen USA 2002 pageant Later Miss Connecticut USA 2010
South Carolina	Crystal Garrett	Columbia	21	Vocal, "As If We Never Said Goodbye" from Sunset Boulevard	Top 16		
South Dakota	Kate Wismer	Britton	22	Classical Vocal, "The Doll Song" from The Tales of Hoffmann			
Tennessee	Grace Gore	Nashville	24	Vocal, "What a Wonderful Day"	Top 16	Quality of Life Award Finalist	Previously Miss Mississippi Teen USA 2002
Texas	Molly Hazlett	Centerville	21	Character Jazz en Pointe, "Rich Man's Frug" from Sweet Charity	Top 8	Preliminary Lifestyle & Fitness Award	
Utah	Jill Stevens	Kaysville	24	Vocal, "Shy" from Once Upon a Mattress	Top 16	America's Choice	
Vermont	Rachel Ann Cole	Middlebury	22	Monologue, "Queen Hermione" from A Winter's Tale			
Virgin Islands	Janeisha John	Saint Croix	20	Jazz Dance			Later Miss US Virgin Islands 2010
Virginia	Hannah Kiefer	High Point, NC	21	Classical Ballet en Pointe, "The Chocolate Dance" from The Nutcracker	3rd runner-up	Charles and Theresa Brown Scholarship	Eligible as a student at Hollins University
Washington	Elyse Umemoto	Wapato	23	Popular Vocal, "Angels"	2nd runner-up		3rd runner-up at National Sweetheart 2006 pageant Contestant on Survivor: South Pacific
West Virginia	Summer Wyatt	Athens	21	Vocal, "Why Haven't I Heard from You"			
Wisconsin	Christina Thompson	Pleasant Prairie	23	Classical Violin, "Praeludium & Allegro" by Fritz Kreisler	Top 8		
Wyoming	Jennifer McCafferty	Scottsbluff, NE	23	Vocal, "Gimme, Gimme" from Thoroughly Modern Millie			Eligible to compete as a student at the University of Wyoming

== Crossovers ==
For the first time since Miss America 2003, four former Miss Universe Organization titleholders competed at Miss America. They are:

- Kari Virding (Oregon) - Miss Oregon Teen USA 2000
- Ashley Bickford (Rhode Island) - Miss Connecticut Teen USA 2002, Top 10 at Miss Teen USA 2002; Triple Crown winner
- Grace Gore (Tennessee) - Miss Mississippi Teen USA 2002
- Cari Leyva (Alaska) - Miss Alaska USA 2004
