= Don't Forget the Lyrics! (American game show) =

American television game show

- Genre: Game show
- Created by: Jeff Apploff
- Directed by: Ron de Moraes (2007–2011); Ashley S. Gorman (2022); John Adams (2023)
- Presented by: Wayne Brady; Mark McGrath; Niecy Nash
- Narrated by: Mark Thompson; Gabe Kunda
- Theme music composer: The Doobie Brothers (2007–2009)
- Opening theme: "China Grove" by Rickey Minor (2007–2009); "Hollywood Swinging" by Kool & the Gang (2022–present)
- Composers: David Vanacore (2007–2009); Raney Shockne (2022–present)
- Country of origin: United States
- Original language: English
- No. of seasons: 6 (Note: As of May 2025. This number of seasons comprises: 2 seasons (Fox, 2007–2009), 1 season (Syndication, 2010–2011), 3 seasons (Fox, 2022–present).)
- No. of episodes: 249 / 252 (Note: As of May 2025. This number of episodes comprises: 54 / 57 episodes (Fox, 2007–2009), (Note: Episodes numbered "101A", "101B", "102A", "102B", "103A", 103B" were half-hour long.); 160 episodes (Syndication, 2010–2011), 35 episodes (Fox, 2022–present).)

Production
- Executive producers: Brad Lachman (2007–2009); Jeff Apploff; Chris Coelen (2007–2011); Greg Goldman (2007–2009); Tony Yates (2010–2011); Julie Pizzi (2022–present); Rupert Dobson (2022–present); Garry Bormet (2022–present); Niecy Nash (2022–present); Pat Kiely (2023–present); Sean O'Riordan (2023–present)
- Running time: ca. 42 minutes
- Production companies: Apploff Entertainment; Brad Lachman Productions (2007–2009); RDF USA (2007–2011); Zodiak USA (2010–2011); 20th Television (2010–2011); Bunim/Murray Productions (2022–present); BiggerStage (2023–present)

Original release
- Network: Fox
- Release: July 11, 2007 – June 19, 2009
- Network: Syndicated
- Release: September 20, 2010 – May 27, 2011
- Network: Fox
- Release: May 23, 2022 – present

Don't Forget the Lyrics! is an American television game show in which contestants compete to win $1 million by correctly recalling song lyrics from a variety of genres. The program originally aired on Fox from July 11, 2007, to June 19, 2009, hosted by Wayne Brady and produced by RDF USA, part of RDF Media. The premiere of the show prompted NBC to move up the premiere of their similar game show, The Singing Bee.

On January 25, 2010, 20th Television announced the debut of a new syndicated version with Sugar Ray lead singer Mark McGrath as host. The show premiered in daytime syndication and in primetime on VH1 on Monday, September 20, 2010. It premiered in primetime on MyNetworkTV on October 5, 2010. On March 24, 2011, the show was canceled along with Are You Smarter than a 5th Grader? due to low ratings.

On April 28, 2021, Fox announced that it had ordered a revival of Don't Forget the Lyrics! with actress and comedian Niecy Nash as host. It premiered on May 23, 2022. On March 4, 2024, the revival was renewed for a third season, which premiered on May 23.

== Gameplay ==
Logo used on Fox's website for the original show's page

A contestant is presented with nine categories representing different genres, time periods, artists, or themes. Each category contains two songs to choose from. In each round, the contestant selects a category and song, and then begins a karaoke performance to a portion of the selected song as the lyrics are displayed on a screen. Eventually, the music stops and the screen displays a group of blanks, representing words that the contestant must attempt to supply.

After the performance, the contestant may review, amend, and lock in their guess, or use one of their "backups" to assist them in figuring out the correct lyric:

- Backup Singer: The contestant can bring a supporter on-stage to perform the song again or otherwise provide their own guess for consideration.
- Two Words: The contestant may have any two words of their choice correctly filled in.
  - The 2022 revival changes this backup to **Three Words**, allowing the contestant to reveal up to three correct words over the course of the entire game. The words may be spread across multiple songs as desired. Starting with Season 3, the backup has become **Five Words**.
- Three Lines: Gives the contestant a choice of three possible answers, one of which is correct. This backup is not used on the 2022 revival.

Contestants progress up a money ladder for each correct answer given, ranging from $2,500 to $500,000 ($250,000 on the 2022 revival). As long as the contestant has not locked in lyrics for the current song, they may choose to walk away with their winnings so far. If the contestant locks in with an incorrect answer, the game ends and they lose any winnings they have accrued. If the contestant makes it past the fourth song, they are guaranteed to leave with no less than $25,000.

If the contestant makes it past all nine categories, they become eligible to play the final "Million-Dollar Song"; the song is always a number-one hit that falls within one of the nine categories, but is not revealed to the contestant in advance. The contestant may either end the game with their winnings up to that point, or risk it for a chance at the $1,000,000 top prize. Unlike the other rounds, the contestant is only allowed to use the Backup Singer, and cannot freely walk away: if they answer incorrectly or walk away, their winnings are reduced to the guaranteed $25,000. Later episodes of the original primetime run also added a $100,000 milestone.

=== Syndicated version ===
The syndicated version of the series uses a modified format: in each episode, a contestant plays four songs from four categories. Each correct answer progresses the contestant up a money ladder, ranging from $1,000 to $10,000; unlike the primetime version, answering incorrectly does not end the game, but does prevent the contestant from reaching the higher amounts. The contestant receives only one backup, Three Lines (referred to as the "Backup").

After four songs, the contestant is given the option to play a double or nothing "Encore" song: if the encore song is answered correctly, the contestant's winnings from the main game are doubled. If answered incorrectly, the contestant loses their winnings, and receives a portable music player as a consolation prize. If all four songs in the main game are answered correctly, the Encore is instead played for the top prize of $50,000, with a consolation prize of $1,000.

=== Money ladder ===
As contestants sing correct lyrics, contestants move up the progressive money ladder and their winnings increases; upon reaching a certain point in the game, their money is guaranteed and contestants keep their amount if they got any lyrics wrong, which indicated in bold.

**Fox version**

Correct song lines	Prize value	
Correct song lines	2007–09	2022
1	$2,500	
2	$5,000	
3	$10,000	
**4**	**$25,000** (Guaranteed sum)	
5	$50,000	
6	$100,000 (Guaranteed sum for Final song)	$75,000
7	$200,000	$100,000
8	$350,000	$150,000
9	$500,000	$250,000
**10**	**$1,000,000** (Grand Prize)	

**Syndicated version**

Correct song lines	Prize value
**1**	**$1,000** (Guaranteed sum after four correct songs)
2	$2,500
3	$5,000
4	$10,000
**5**	**2× multiplier or $50,000** (Grand Prize after four correct songs)

== Ratings ==
In its 2007 debut, Don't Forget the Lyrics! averaged a 3.4 rating in adults 18-49.

The 2022 version premiered to 2.08 million viewers with a 0.4/3 rating/share.

== Notable contestants ==
- On October 11, 2007, Tony Gubelman became the first contestant to walk away with no prize money after he did not get the lyrics to the song "Piano Man" at the $25,000 level.
- Dottie Harris became the first contestant to win $500,000, but opted not to risk $400,000 to attempt the Million Dollar Song.
- Shamari Berkley became the first contestant under the age of 18, as he was 11 years old when he played the game with the rules changed slightly, in that, an incorrect answer meant no lost money and the $2,500 level was simply given to him. Many of the songs dealt with something kids would know, such as "Take Me Out to the Ball Game" and the "Hokey Pokey". He walked away with $350,000 (the largest prize ever won by a minor on an American game show). Shamari is also a child actor.
- Boyz II Men appeared as celebrity contestants, playing for charity, on an episode aired on February 21, 2008. They won $500,000.
- REO Speedwagon frontman Kevin Cronin appeared as a contestant on the March 27, 2008 episode. Like Boyz II Men, he ended the show with a concert, singing Roll with the Changes.
- On April 17, 2008, season two American Idol contestant Kimberley Locke became the first contestant in the show's history to attempt the Million Dollar Song. Locke sang Ringo Starr's "You're Sixteen" as the final song but chose to end the game without locking in the lyrics and left with $100,000 that was raised for her charity, Camp Heartland.
- On May 1, 2008, Poison frontman Bret Michaels won $200,000. He donated $100,000 each to the Juvenile Diabetes Research Foundation and St. Jude Children's Research Hospital.
- On November 7, 2008, all four original members of R&B girl group En Vogue appeared to compete for the charities of their choice, winning a total of $350,000 for the Cancer Centers of America, St. Jude's, and RBI International (the $50,000 went to taxes).
- On December 12, 2008, three Miss Americas, Kirsten Haglund (Miss America 2008), Heather French Henry (Miss America 2000), and Susan Powell (Miss America 1981) competed for the Miss America Scholarship Fund.
- On January 16, 2009, Penn & Teller appeared on the show with Carrot Top as one of their helpers.
- On May 22, 2009, Meat Loaf and his daughter Pearl appeared and got to $500,000 before opting to walk with the money and donating it to The Painted Turtle. They were the last players to win $500,000.
- On October 5, 2010, four members of the Backstreet Boys appeared on the show. They won $5,000 for UNICEF after being unsuccessful while attempting at the $50,000 encore song. Following the game, the group announced to donate an additional $5,000 to UNICEF.
- On October 12, 2010, season four American Idol runner-up Bo Bice won the grand prize of $50,000 for his charity, the MusiCares Foundation.
- On October 18, 2010, rap duo Kid 'n Play appeared on the show. They won $5,000 to donate to The Red Cross fund for Haiti.
- On October 21, 2010, actress Tia Carrere appeared on the show. She won $5,000 for her charity, After-School All-Stars Hawaii.
- On October 22, 2010, comedian Margaret Cho appeared on the show. She won $5,000 for her charity, The Institute for Marine Mammal Studies.
- On November 3, 2010, singer Elliott Yamin appeared on the show. He won $5,000 for his charities, JDRF and Malaria No More.
- On November 5, 2010, singer Blake Lewis appeared on the show. He won $5,000 for his charity, The Seattle Children's Hospital.
- Actor and composer Alan Thicke appeared on the show. His appearance was notable as he did not know the tune to some of the songs and more or less quoted lyrics rather than sing. He was also the first celebrity to miss a song but still won $5,000 for charity.
- Chantal Claret who has been a member of the band, Morningwood also appeared on the show winning $5,000 for the Susan G. Komen Breast Cancer Foundation.
- On December 10, 2010, Matt Nathanson after releasing his one hit wonder, Come on Get Higher, got one word wrong on the encore song for $50,000. But still won $5,000 for his charity, Edible Schoolyard.
- On December 17, 2010, KT Tunstall won $5,000 for the Susan G. Komen Breast Cancer Foundation.
- On August 1, 2023, future Big Brother 26 contestant Rubina Bernabe appeared on the show. She walked away with $10,000.

== Guest appearances ==
- On April 10, 2008, Gloria Gaynor appeared and performed "I Will Survive".
- On July 31, 2008, Kenny Loggins appeared and performed the songs "I'm Alright" and "Footloose".

== Winners and losers ==
=== Penultimate song correct ===
==== Fox version (original) ====
- Dottie Harris (first civilian contestant to win $500,000)
- Boyz II Men (February 21, 2008; first celebrity contestants and first duo to win $500,000)
- Asia Craft (October 10, 2008)
- Mark Weiser and J'Nae Fincannon (December 19, 2008)
- Meat Loaf and Pearl Aday (May 22, 2009)

=== Final song incorrect ===
==== Fox version (original) ====
- Kimberley Locke (April 17, 2008) - You're Sixteen - Ringo Starr 1974
- Diana Drake (May 15, 2008) - Blame it on the Rain - Milli Vanilli 1989

=== Top prize winners ===
==== Syndicated version ====
- Karina Buettgenbach (October 4, 2010)
- Bo Bice (October 12, 2010)
- Sandra Benton (October 26, 2010)
- Regan Rothery (December 31, 2010)
- Felice Schaeffer (January 11, 2011)

== Transmissions ==
Run	Series	No. of episodes	Year(s) aired
First prime-time run (Fox)	1	54 / 57	2007–2008
First prime-time run (Fox)	2	13	2008–2009
Syndication	1	160	2010–2011
Second prime-time run (Fox)	1	12	2022
Second prime-time run (Fox)	2	12	2023
Second prime-time run (Fox)	3	11	2024
Second prime-time run (Fox)	4	TBA	TBA

== International versions ==
In addition to the basic show in the United States, there were many affiliated international versions of the show.

== See also ==
- All Star K!
- Beat Shazam - another game show involving music and the recognition of lyrics to hit songs, with a top prize of $1 million
- I Can See Your Voice - another game show involving guessing of music
