= Amanda Kozak =

American model (born 1984)

Amanda Kozak Miliner
- Born: Amanda Kozak; July 28, 1984 (age 42); Warner Robins, Georgia, U.S.
- Height: 5 ft 10 in (1.78 m)
- Beauty pageant titleholder
- Title: Miss Warner Robins 2005; Miss Valdosta 2006; Miss Georgia 2006; Miss Georgia USA 2008
- Hair color: Brown
- Eye color: Brown
- Major competitions: Miss America 2007 (2nd runner-up); Miss USA 2008

Amanda Kozak-Miliner (born July 28, 1984) is a pageant titleholder and educator from Warner Robins, Georgia who competed in the Miss America and Miss USA pageants. She is also the 2015 Georgia Teacher of the Year.

== Pageants ==
=== Miss America ===
Kozak first competed in the Miss Georgia pageant in 2004 where she won a preliminary evening wear award made the top eleven. The following year representing as Miss Warner Robins 2005 she placed first runner-up to Monica Pang. Kozak represented Georgia in the Miss National Sweetheart pageant, a competition for Miss America state runners-up, in September 2005, and placed first runner-up.

In June 2006, after winning the Miss Valdosta 2006 local title, Kozak competed in the Miss Georgia pageant. She won preliminary awards in both the evening gown and swimsuit competitions and was crowned Miss Georgia 2006 on June 25, 2006. Her platform for the state pageant was "Positive Role Models Through Mentoring".

Kozak represented Georgia in the Miss America 2007 pageant held in Las Vegas, Nevada on 29 January 2007 and placed second runner-up to Lauren Nelson of Oklahoma. This was the second consecutive year that Georgia placed in the top three, as Pang had placed first runner-up at Miss America 2006. Kozak's talent was a tap dance performance, and her platform issue was Mentoring with the Big Brothers Big Sisters of America Organization. She was also a finalist for the Quality of Life award.

Kozak was given the key to the city of Valdosta by mayor John Fretti and signs were erected in Valdosta congratulating her on her win.

=== Miss USA ===
On November 10, 2007, she was crowned Miss Georgia USA 2008, the first Georgian to win both state Miss America and Miss USA state titles.

She represented Georgia at the Miss USA 2008 pageant held on April 18 in Las Vegas, Nevada. She did not place in the pageant, which was won by Crystle Stewart of Texas.

== Georgia Teacher of the Year ==
On May 16, 2014, Amanda Miliner (previously Kozak) was named the 2015 Georgia Teacher of the Year at the annual banquet ceremony. The Georgia Teacher of the Year serves as an advocate for public education in Georgia.

== Personal life ==
Kozak's parents were both in the military, and she stayed with friends in Georgia while they were simultaneously deployed, including a one-year deployment in Korea. She is a graduate of Warner Robins High School and has a bachelor's degree in Early Childhood Education from Valdosta State University. At the time she held the Miss Georgia title, she was working as a third-grade teacher.

Preceded by Brittany Swann	Miss Georgia USA; 2008	Succeeded by Kimberly Gittings
Preceded by Monica Pang	Miss Georgia; 2006	Succeeded by Leah Massee
