= Preslar =

Preslar is a surname. Notable people with the surname include:

- Casey Preslar (fl. 1997), American beauty pageant contestant
- Len Preslar (born 1947), American economist
- Lyle Preslar (fl. 1980), American musician
