= George Frazier (pitcher) =

American baseball player (1954–2023)

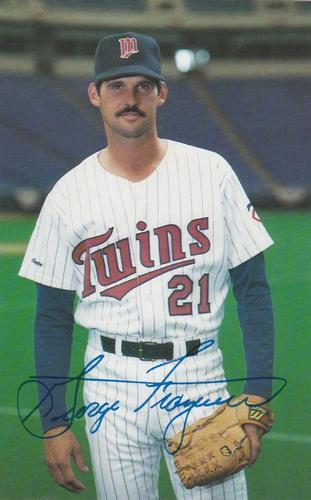
- Frazier in 1987
- Pitcher
- Born: October 13, 1954; Oklahoma City, Oklahoma, U.S.
- Died: June 19, 2023 (aged 68); Tulsa, Oklahoma, U.S.
- Batted: Right Threw: Right

MLB debut
- May 25, 1978, for the St. Louis Cardinals

Last MLB appearance
- October 4, 1987, for the Minnesota Twins

MLB statistics
- Win–loss record: 35–43
- Earned run average: 4.20
- Strikeouts: 449
- Stats at Baseball Reference

Teams
- St. Louis Cardinals (1978–1980); New York Yankees (1981–1983); Cleveland Indians (1984); Chicago Cubs (1984–1986); Minnesota Twins (1986–1987)

Career highlights and awards
- World Series champion (1987)

George Allen Frazier (October 13, 1954 – June 19, 2023) was an American professional baseball player who pitched in the Major Leagues from 1978 to 1987, primarily as a set-up reliever.

== Early life ==
Frazier played high school baseball at Hillcrest High School in Springfield, Missouri. Frazier was offered a college scholarship in baseball, football, and basketball. He attended the University of Oklahoma and pitched for their 1975 and 1976 College World Series teams.

== Professional career ==
Frazier was traded from the Milwaukee Brewers to the St. Louis Cardinals for Buck Martinez during the Winter Meetings on December 8, 1977.

Frazier saw his first postseason action when the Yankees made it to the 1981 World Series. In the ALCS against Oakland, he was tasked to pitch in the fourth inning in Game 2, which saw him go 5 2/3 innings while allowing no runs on five hits, one walk, and five strikeouts as the Yankees won 13-3 on their way to a sweep. The World Series was not as fortunate for Frazier or the Yankees. In Game 3, with the Yankees having won the first two games of the series, he was sent out to pitch in the third inning when starter Dave Righetti could only last two batters into the third inning with a 4-3 Yankee lead. With two on and no out, Frazier generated three quick outs in the third inning and had a clean fourth inning. The fifth inning, however, was not fortunate. He allowed two hits and two walks (one intentional) that saw the game tied with no outs before he was taken out for Rudy May, who promptly gave up the go-ahead run on a ground ball double play in an eventual 5-4 loss. Game 4 the next day was even less fortunate. In the 6th inning, with the Yankees having given up three runs to lose a 6-3 lead, he was brought in with two runners on and one out. He quelled the rally, then allowed back-to-back hits in the 7th before being taken out after delivering an intentional walk. Starter Tommy John came in, and allowed one of Frazier’s runners to score on a sacrifice fly. The Dodgers took a 7-6 lead that they would never give up, winning 8-7 victory and Frazier again taking the loss. Four days later in Game 6, with the Yankees facing elimination, Frazier was sent out to pitch the 5th inning of a tie game. He got two of the first three batters out, but Ron Cey hit a groundball single to center to give the Dodgers the lead before Pedro Guerrero hit a triple to clear the bases and make it 4-1 as the Dodgers eventually won 9-2. In total, Frazier was the losing pitcher in three of the last four games of the World Series, which tied a record for most losses by a pitcher by Lefty Williams in the infamous 1919 World Series.

Frazier pitched in the NLCS for the Cubs and allowed two runs in 1.2 innings in Game 3.

Frazier was on the 1987 World Series-winning Minnesota Twins. He appeared once in the team’s postseason run, mopping up the seventh and eighth innings of a 7-2 Game 4 loss. It ended up being his last major league appearance.

== Career statistics ==
Over his ten-year career, Frazier appeared in 415 games and was credited with 35 wins, 29 saves, and a 4.20 ERA.

== Post-playing career ==
Frazier served as a color analyst for the Twins in 1993 and for the Colorado Rockies from 1998 until 2015. Following that he did color commentary for Fox Sports during the Big 12 Baseball championship broadcasts while also serving as a color analyst for Oklahoma baseball on television from 2015 to 2023.

== Personal life and death ==
A son, Matthew Frazier, served as a detective for the Tulsa Police Department and appeared on the A&E television show The First 48. Another son, Parker Frazier, was drafted in the eighth round of the 2007 MLB draft by the Colorado Rockies. His daughter, Georgia Frazier, was crowned Miss Oklahoma 2015.

Frazier died in Tulsa, Oklahoma, on June 19, 2023, at the age of 68.
