= Miss America 2007 =

80th edition of the Miss America competition

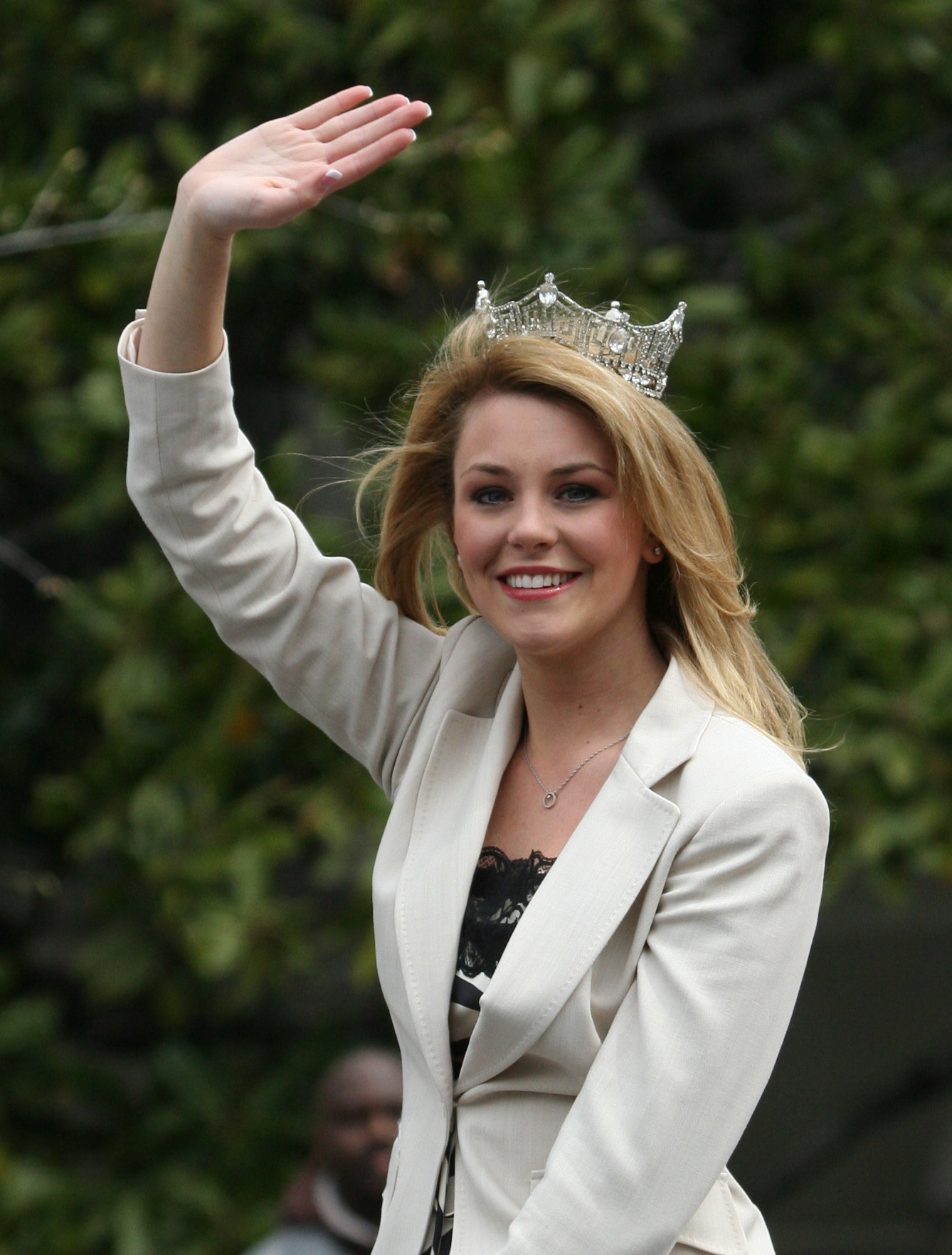
- Date: January 29, 2007
- Presenters: Mario Lopez
- Venue: Aladdin Resort and Casino, Las Vegas, Nevada
- Broadcaster: CMT
- Winner: Lauren Nelson; Oklahoma

Miss America 2007, the 80th Miss America pageant, was held on the Las Vegas Strip in Paradise, Nevada on Monday, January 29, 2007, making it the first time that the pageant was held on a weekday, rather than the traditional Saturday since 1927's contest.

The pageant was broadcast live on CMT from the Theatre for the Performing Arts at the Aladdin Resort and Casino, only the second time that the pageant has been held outside Atlantic City.

At the conclusion of the final night of competition, outgoing titleholder Jennifer Berry crowned Lauren Nelson as her successor. Both titleholders are from Oklahoma, only the second occurrence of two consecutive winners from one state. The last time that two titleholders from the same state won in consecutive years was 1959 and 1960, when Mississippi did the honor.

== Results ==
=== Placements ===
Placement	Contestant
Miss America 2007	Oklahoma – Lauren Nelson
1st Runner-Up	Texas – Shilah Phillips
2nd Runner-Up	Georgia – Amanda Kozak
3rd Runner-Up	Mississippi – Taryn Foshee
4th Runner-Up	Alabama – Melinda Toole
Top 10	California – Jacquelynne Fontaine; Hawaii – Pilialoha Gaison; Pennsylvania – Emily Wills; Utah – Katie Millar; Washington – Kristen Eddings

=== Awards ===
==== Preliminary awards ====
Awards	Contestant
Lifestyle and Fitness	Oklahoma - Lauren Nelson; Nebraska - Molly McGrath; Pennsylvania - Emily Wills
Talent	Texas - Shilah Phillips; Hawaii - Pilialoha Gaison; California - Jacquelynne Fontaine

==== Quality of Life awards ====
Results	Contestant	Platform
Winner	Rhode Island - Allison Rogers	Go Green! Global Warming Awareness
1st runner-up	Arizona - Hilary Griffith	Strength Over Silence: Rape Awareness And Recovery
2nd runner-up	Alabama - Melinda Toole	Character Education
Finalists	Georgia - Amanda Kozak; Indiana - Betsy Uschkrat; Michigan - Angela Corsi; Virginia - Adrianna Sgarlata	Various

==== Other awards ====
Awards	Contestant
Miss Congeniality	Alabama - Melinda Toole
Non-finalist Talent Award	Minnesota - Nicole Swanson; (New York (state)) New York - Bethlene Pancoast; South Carolina - Shelley Benthall; Vermont - Sarah Watson

== Judges ==
The six judges for the competition were:

- Entertainer, Debbie Allen
- Photographer and television personality, Nigel Barker
- Actress and Miss Florida 1974, Delta Burke
- Musician, Michael Feinstein
- Television personality, Chris Matthews
- Television personality and Miss America 1981, Susan Powell

== Crossovers ==
Unusually, no former Miss USA delegates competed in this pageant, although Sarah French, formerly Miss Arkansas Teen USA 2004 (and Miss Photogenic at Miss Teen USA) competed as Miss Missouri. Later on Amanda Kozak, Miss Georgia won the Miss Georgia USA 2008 title and competed at Miss USA 2008.
