= Miss Oklahoma's Teen =

- Formation: 2003
- Type: Beauty pageant
- Headquarters: Tulsa
- Location: Oklahoma
- Members: Miss America's Teen
- Official language: English
- Website: Official website

For the state pageant affiliated with Miss Teen USA, see Miss Oklahoma Teen USA

The Miss Oklahoma's Teen competition is the pageant that selects the representative for the U.S. state of Oklahoma in the Miss America's Teen pageant.

Finley Henderson of Edmond was crowned Miss Oklahoma's Teen on June 13, 2026, at the Rose State Performing Arts Center in Rose State College in Midwest City. She competed for the title of Miss America's Teen 2027 on September 5, 2026, at the Kravis Center for the Performing Arts in West Palm Beach, Florida.

== Results summary ==
The year in parentheses indicates year of Miss America's Outstanding Teen competition the award/placement was garnered.

=== Placements ===
- Miss America's Outstanding Teen: Lacey Russ (2011), Nicole Jia (2017)
- 1st runners-up: Ashten Vincent (2014)
- 2nd runners-up: Aubrey Bartmann (2024)
- 4th runners-up: Carrigan Bradley (2016)
- Top 8: Julianne Thomison (2013)
- Top 9: Evelyn Smith (2018)
- Top 10: Molly Colvard (2007), Jamie Butemeyer (2008), Alicia Clifton (2009), Claire Grace (2020)
- Top 11 (Top 10 along with a People's Choice): Ella Phillips (2022), Bella Brown (2023), Kynlee Schultheis (2025)
- Top 15: Becca Hester (2006)

=== Awards ===
==== Preliminary awards ====
- Preliminary Evening Gown: Aubrey Bartmann (2024)
- Preliminary Evening Wear/On-Stage Question: Lacey Russ (2011), Ashten Vincent (2014), Joei Whisenant (2015), Evelyn Smith (2018) (tie)
- Preliminary Talent: Alicia Clifton (2009), Ashten Vincent (2014)

==== Non-finalist awards ====
- Non-finalist Evening Wear/On-Stage Question: Joei Whisenant (2015)

==== Other awards ====
- Miss Congeniality/Spirit of America: Becca Hester (2006)
- Outstanding Instrumental Talent Award: Nicole Jia (2017)
- Teens in Action Award Winners: Ashten Vincent (2014)
- Teens in Action Award Finalists: Claire Grace (2020)

== Winners ==
- Declared as Winner
- Ended as a runner-up
- Ended as a finalist or semi-finalist

Year	Name	Hometown	Age	Local title	Talent	Placement at MAO Teen	Special scholarships at MAO Teen	Notes
2026	Finley Henderson	Oklahoma City	15	Miss Oil Capital's Teen	Jazz Dance			
2025	Taylor Meeks	Pocasset	16	Miss Bricktown’s Teen	Jazz, “Don’t Stop Me Now”			
2024	Kynlee Schultheis	Tulsa	15	Miss CrossRoad's Teen	Ballet en Point, "Orange Colored Sky"	Top 11		
2023	Aubrey Bartmann	Tulsa	17	Miss Tulsa's Teen	Vocal	2nd Runner-Up	Preliminary Evening Gown	
2022	Bella Brown	Choctaw	16	Miss Oklahoma City's Outstanding Teen	Vocal, "Pulled"	Top 11		
2021	Ella Phillips	Tulsa	18	Miss OCU's Outstanding Teen	Classical Vocal, “The Doll Aria”	Top 11		
2019-20	Claire Grace	Stillwater	17	Miss Frontier Country's Outstanding Teen	Vocal, "The Girl in 14G"	Top 10	Teens in Action Award Finalist	Later 3rd runner-up at Miss Oklahoma 2022 Later Miss Bricktown 2022
2018	Sydney Massey	Tulsa	15	Miss Oklahoma City's Outstanding Teen	Musical Theatre Dance, "So Much Better" from Legally Blonde			
2017	Evelyn Smith	Oklahoma City	16	Miss Oklahoma City's Outstanding Teen	Lyrical Dance	Top 9	Preliminary Evening Wear/OSQ Award (tie)	Sister of Miss Oklahoma Teen USA 2016, Hellen Smith First African American titleholder Later Distinguished Young Woman of Oklahoma 2019; Top 8 at Distinguished Young Woman of America 2019 competition Later 4th runner-up at Miss Oklahoma 2022 Later Miss District of Columbia 2026
2016	Addison Price	Edmond	17	Miss Tulsa's Outstanding Teen	Dance	N/A		Assumed title when Jia was named Miss America's Outstanding Teen 2017 Later Miss Oklahoma 2019 3rd Runner-Up to Miss America 2020
2016	Nicole Jia	Oklahoma City	17	Miss Bethany's Outstanding Teen	Piano, Variations on Mozart's “Rondo Alla Turca”	Winner	Outstanding Instrumental Talent Award	
2015	Carrigan Bradley	Fort Gibson	16	Miss Edmond Liberty Fest's Outstanding Teen	Vocal, "That's Life"	4th runner-up		4th runner-up at Miss Oklahoma 2017 pageant 2nd runner-up at Miss Oklahoma 2018 pageant
2014	Joei Whisenant	Ada	16	Miss Edmond Liberty Fest's Outstanding Teen	Vocal		Non-finalist Evening Wear/OSQ Award Preliminary Evening Wear/OSQ Award	
2013	Ashten Vincent	Edmond	16	Miss Edmond Liberty Fest's Outstanding Teen	Vocal	1st runner-up	Preliminary Evening Wear/OSQ Award Preliminary Talent Award Teens in Action Award	1st runner-up at Miss Oklahoma 2016 and 2019 pageants
2012	Julianne Thomison	Tulsa	14	Miss Tulsa's Outstanding Teen	Dance	Top 8		3rd runner-up at Miss Oklahoma 2016 and 2018 pageants 2nd runner-up at Miss Oklahoma 2017 pageant
2011	Clytee Burchett	Choctaw	16	Miss Edmond Liberty Fest's Outstanding Teen	Dance			
2010	Heather Rasmussen	Tulsa	14	Miss Oklahoma City's Outstanding Teen	Dance	N/A		Assumed title when Russ was named Miss America's Outstanding Teen 2011 3rd runner-up at Miss Oklahoma 2017 pageant
2010	Lacey Russ	Cordell	16	Miss Southwestern Oklahoma State University's Outstanding Teen	Piano, Bach’s "Prelude XXI" and Beethoven’s "Sonata Pathetique"	Winner	Preliminary Evening Wear/OSQ Award	
2009	Georgia Frazier	Tulsa	17	Miss Tulsa State Fair's Outstanding Teen	Vocal			Top 16 at National Sweetheart 2014 pageant Later Miss Oklahoma 2015; Top 10 at Miss America 2016 pageant
2008	Alicia Clifton	Oklahoma City	16	Miss Tulsa's Outstanding Teen	Tap Dance	Top 10	Preliminary Talent Award	Later Miss Oklahoma 2012; 2nd runner-up at Miss America 2013 pageant
2007	Jamie Butemeyer	Lawton	16	Miss South OKC's Outstanding Teen		Top 10		
2006	Molly Colvard	Elk Grove	16	Miss Oklahoma City University's Outstanding Teen	Vocal	Top 10		Sister of Miss Oklahoma Teen USA 2009, Chelsea Colvard
2005	Becca Hester	Tulsa	17	Miss Oklahoma City University's Outstanding Teen	Vocal	Top 15	Spirit of America Award	
2004	Lauren Nelson	Lawton	17	Miss Teen Lawton	Vocal	No national pageant Was previously an independent pageant with the winner earning the title of, "Miss Teen Oklahoma" Changed to current title after a national pageant was created by the Miss America Organization in 2005		Later Miss Oklahoma 2006; Crowned Miss America 2007
2003	Ashley Jo Hobbs	Broken Arrow	16	Miss Teen OCU	Musical Theatre Jazz Dance, “Hit Me With a Hot Note”	No national pageant Was previously an independent pageant with the winner earning the title of, "Miss Teen Oklahoma" Changed to current title after a national pageant was created by the Miss America Organization in 2005		
