= Georgine R. Leeka =

Georgine Leeka (September 6, 1929 – February 19, 2011) was an American beauty pageant titleholder.

== Biography ==
She was crowned "Miss Oklahoma" in 1949 and represented her state in the Miss America 1949 Pageant.

She later married Clyde Jones, from Tennessee, and by 2011 had been living in Huntsville, Alabama, since 1961. They had five children, fourteen grandchildren, and four great grandchildren. They were members of the Central Church of Christ in Huntsville, where Mr. Jones served as an elder.
