= Shilah Phillips =

Shilah Precious Phillips is an American entertainer, beauty pageant contestant, and the 2006 winner of the Miss Texas title. She is the first African American winner of the crown in its 75-year history. She was also First Runner Up in the Miss America 2007 pageant.

== Early life ==
Phillips grew up in Denver, where she attended a performing arts school from sixth to twelfth grade. She studied voice at Howard University before dropping out and moving to California to try to become a singer, making demo records and auditioning for American Idol (Season 3).

She returned to Texas, studying vocal music at Collin County Community College.

== Miss America runner up ==
Phillips entered the Miss Frisco 2006 contest after friends warned her that at 24 she was getting close to beauty pageants' cutoff age. She won the title on October 30, 2005, also winning its talent portion and swimsuit contest.

On July 8, 2006, at age 24 years, Phillips won the Miss Texas 2006 title, becoming the first African-American to hold the Miss Texas title in the 75-year history of the contest.

This was the first time Phillips took part in the Miss Texas pageant. She is only the second woman in the history of the program to win the title on her first try. She competed as Miss Frisco, sponsored by the Miss Plano Frisco Scholarship Organization.

Between the Miss Texas pageant and the Miss America pageant, Phillips took part in an MTV reality show called Pageant School: Becoming Miss America. According to Slate, "The centerpiece of this inaugural Pageant School was Miss Texas. She’s tall, bright, and powerfully glamorous, with that intimidating Lone Star star quality. Her tears welled up sincerely when she talked about how proud she was to be 'the first African-American Miss Texas.'"

Phillips competed in the Miss America 2007 pageant on January 29, 2007. Awards in several categories were based on votes from viewers. Phillips took first place in the viewer voting contest for talent.

As one of the final five contestants, Phillips performed live near the end of the evening, singing Whitney Houston's hit "I Believe in You and Me." According to the New York Daily News, "Some of the loudest applause for a surviving finalist was for 24-year-old Shilah Phillips."

Phillips was first runner-up to Miss Oklahoma (Lauren Paige Nelson), who was crowned as Miss America 2007.

Awards and achievements
Preceded by Morgan Matlock	Miss Texas; 2006	Succeeded by Molly Hazlett
