= Georgia Frazier =

American beauty pageant titleholder from Oklahoma

- Born: Georgia Lynn Frazier; April 20, 1992 (age 34); Tulsa, Oklahoma, U.S.
- Education: University of Oklahoma; Oral Roberts University
- Title: Miss Oklahoma's Outstanding Teen 2009; Miss Oklahoma 2015
- Spouse: Todd Canady (m. 2017)
- Children: 2
- Website: www.georgiafrazier.com

Georgia Lynn Canady (née Frazier; born April 20, 1992) is an American beauty pageant titleholder from Tulsa, Oklahoma, who was crowned Miss Oklahoma's Outstanding Teen 2009 and Miss Oklahoma 2015. She competed for the Miss America 2016 title in September 2015 and placed in the Top 10.

== Pageant career ==
=== Miss Oklahoma's Outstanding Teen ===
Frazier began entering beauty pageants at a young age. In her fourth try for the state title, she was crowned Miss Oklahoma's Outstanding Teen 2009. With her platform “Mentoring Works! You’re a Thumb-Body” which encouraged children to celebrate being unique, like a thumbprint, Frazier competed for the Miss America's Outstanding Teen 2010 title.

=== Competing as an adult ===
After her teen title, Frazier began competing in the main Miss America system. She was crowned Miss Oklahoma State Fair 2011 and competed for Miss Oklahoma in June 2011 where she made the Top 15.

In July 2011, she won the Miss Okmulgee County 2012 title and sang "My Man" in the talent competition. She shifted her community efforts to raising cervical cancer awareness. In June 2012, she placed in the top eleven at Miss Oklahoma 2012 and won a scholarship to Oral Roberts University in the preliminary interview competition.

In September 2012, Frazier won the Miss Oklahoma State Fair 2013 title. She entered the Miss Oklahoma 2013 pageant with a platform promoting cervical cancer awareness and performing "I Dreamed a Dream" from the musical Les Misérables in the talent competition. Frazier was the second runner-up for the state title and the Kiwanis Community Service Award winner, earning a combined $5,000 in scholarships.

In July 2013, Frazier won the Miss Okmulgee County 2014 title. At the Miss Oklahoma 2014 pageant, she competed on a "Warriors For Women" health platform and sang "Yesterday" in the talent competition, placing first runner-up for the state title. As a runner-up for the 2014 Miss Oklahoma title, Frazier competed at National Sweetheart where she placed in the top 16.

=== Miss Oklahoma 2015 ===
Frazier was crowned Miss Ada 2015 which made her eligible to compete at the 2015 Miss Oklahoma pageant. Entering the state pageant in June 2015 as one of 47 finalists, Frazier's competition talent was singing "Happy Days Are Here Again". Her platform is "Warriors For Women", teaching women to be more proactive about their personal health. In her fifth try for the statewide title, Frazier was named Miss Oklahoma 2015 on Saturday, June 6, 2015, when she received her crown from outgoing Miss Oklahoma titleholder, Alexandra Eppler.

She earned $16,000 in scholarship money and a new Audi automobile from the state pageant. Frazier told the Tulsa World that her immediate post-pageant plans were to "grab a cheeseburger and listen to country music in her new car". As Miss Oklahoma, her activities include public appearances across the state of Oklahoma, including schools, civic groups, and charity events.

=== Vying for Miss America 2016 ===
Frazier was Oklahoma's representative at the Miss America 2016 pageant in Atlantic City, New Jersey, in September 2015. In the televised finale on September 13, 2015, she sang Barbra Streisand's version of "Happy Days Are Here Again" during the talent portion of the competition. Frazier placed in the Top 10 finalists and earned a $7,000 scholarship award.

== Education ==
Frazier is a native of Tulsa, Oklahoma, and a 2010 graduate of Jenks High School. Her mother is Kay Frazier. Her father was George Frazier, a professional baseball player who pitched in the Major Leagues from 1978 to 1987 and served as a television commentator for the Colorado Rockies.

Frazier attended the University of Oklahoma (OU) for her first two years of college. While a student at OU, Frazier became a member of the Alpha Chi Omega sorority. In August 2011, doctors discovered that Frazier had early-stage cervical cancer. She continued her studies and pageant career while receiving treatment for her cancer. The cancer recurred in July 2012 but, as of February 2013, she is again in remission.

After winning a scholarship to Oral Roberts University (ORU) during the Miss Oklahoma 2011 pageant, she switched schools for her junior and senior years. Frazier graduated from ORU in 2014 with a bachelor of arts degree in Corporate Communications with a minor in humanities.

== Career ==
She worked in marketing at Celebrity Attractions, a professional arts organization in Tulsa. She was the executive director for Oklahoma and Arkansas at Muscular Dystrophy Association. She currently serves as the Director of Development of Little Light House, a development center for children with Special Needs in Tulsa, OK.

== Personal life ==
In August 2015, she met Todd Canady, a Tulsa, Oklahoma, firefighter. They married in November 2017, and have three sons.

Awards and achievements
| Preceded by Alexandra Eppler | Miss Oklahoma; 2015 | Succeeded by Sarah Klein |
| Preceded by Alicia Clifton | Miss Oklahoma's Outstanding Teen; 2009 | Succeeded by Lacey Russ |
