= Emoly Ann West =

American beauty pageant titleholder (born 1986)

Emoly West
- Born: Emoly Ann West; January 6, 1986 (age 40); Edmond, Oklahoma, U.S.
- Education: University of Central Oklahoma
- Beauty pageant titleholder
- Title: Miss Queen of the West 2005; Miss Keystone Lake 2006; Miss Edmond Liberty Fest 2008; Miss Grand Lake 2009; Miss Edmond Liberty Fest 2010; Miss Oklahoma 2010
- Hair color: Blonde
- Eye color: Blue
- Major competition: Miss America 2011 (4th runner-up)

Emoly Ann West (born January 6, 1986) is an American beauty pageant titleholder who was crowned Miss Oklahoma 2010 and was fourth runner-up in the Miss America 2011 pageant on January 15, 2011, in Las Vegas, Nevada.

West competed at Miss Oklahoma as Miss Edmond LibertyFest, and it was her fifth try for the title. She had previously been second runner-up to Miss Oklahoma 2009 and fourth runner-up to Miss Oklahoma 2008.

At the time of her selection as Miss Oklahoma, West was a senior at the University of Central Oklahoma, majoring in Dance and minoring in Broadcast Journalism. Her talent is Ballet en Pointe, and she has studied many types of dance, including jazz, tap, lyrical, modern, and hip hop since the age of 4. She has also been teaching dance since she was 14. Her platform was Leadership and Character Development.

With her parental family West attends the Memorial Road Church of Christ in Oklahoma City.

Preceded by Taylor Treat	Miss Oklahoma; 2010	Succeeded by Betty Thompson
