= Louise O'Brien =

American singer (1928–2016)

- Born: 1928; Tulsa, Oklahoma
- Died: January 25, 2016 (age 87) New York City, New York, United States
- Genres: Traditional pop
- Instrument: Vocals

Louise O'Brien (1928–2016) was an American vocalist. The 1950 Miss Oklahoma (and 4th runner-up in the subsequent Miss America pageant), she is best known for her many television performances on talk and variety shows of the 1950s and 1960s, most notably during the Jack Paar era of The Tonight Show.

== Early life ==
O'Brien was born in Tulsa, Oklahoma, the daughter of Oklahoma State Penitentiary warden Edward Patrick O'Brien. Her earliest performances were for the inmates there. She also had her own local radio and TV shows while in high school. After winning Miss Oklahoma, she attended Tulsa University and shuttled back and forth to Hollywood to appear on several early shows before becoming a regular on The Pat Boone Chevy Showroom and Liberace's brief daytime show.

== Death ==
According to family members, O'Brien died January 25, 2016, in New York City at age 87, and is survived by children Christopher and Maureen Lane, brother Harold O'Brien and sister Mildred O'Brien.

== Filmography ==
All dates from IMDb, except as noted below.

- The Red Skelton Hour (1955)
- The Pat Boone Chevy Showroom (1957-1960 as a series regular)
- The Jimmy Dean Show (1958)
- The Garry Moore Show (1958, 1960)
- The Tonight Show (1958-1962, 27 total appearances)
- Sing Along with Mitch (1962 as a series regular)
- The Merv Griffin Show (1962-1963, 3 total appearances)
- Candid Camera (November 17, 1963)
- The Jack Paar Program (1964)
- That Regis Philbin Show (1965)
- Today (May 4, 1965)
- The Joey Bishop Show (1968, 2 appearances)
