= Miss America 2003 =

Beauty Pageant held in 2003

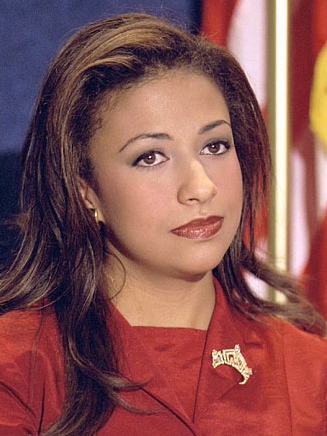
- Miss America 2003, Erika Harold, in 2002
- Date: September 21, 2002
- Presenters: Wayne Brady Julie Moran
- Venue: Boardwalk Hall, Atlantic City, New Jersey
- Broadcaster: ABC
- Winner: Erika Harold; Illinois

Miss America 2003, the 76th Miss America pageant, was televised live from Boardwalk Hall in Atlantic City, New Jersey on Saturday, September 21, 2002 on the ABC Network. Erika Harold of Illinois won the pageant.

== Results ==
=== Placements ===
Final results	Contestant
Miss America 2003	Illinois - Erika Harold
1st runner-up	Alabama - Scarlotte Deupree
2nd runner-up	Oklahoma - Casey Preslar
3rd runner-up	Nevada - Teresa Benitez
4th runner-up	Maryland - Camille Lewis
Top 10	Connecticut - Tanisha Brito; Massachusetts - Melanie Beth Correia; Mississippi - Jennifer Adcock; (New York (state)) New York - Tiffany Walker; Texas - Lisa Dalzell
Top 15	Arizona - Laura Lawless; Indiana - Tangra Riggle; North Carolina - Misty Clymer; South Carolina - Kelly McCorkle; (Washington (state)) Washington - Amanda Beers

=== Awards ===
Awards	Contestant
Gown	Maryland - Camille Lewis; Missouri - Shandi Finnessey; New Jersey - Alicia Luciano
Interview	Nevada - Teresa Benitez; Texas - Lisa Dalzell; Illinois - Erika Harold
Lifestyle and Fitness	(New York (state)) New York - Tiffany Walker; Mississippi - Jennifer Adcock; Arkansas - Lauren Davidson
On Stage Interview	(Georgia (U.S. state)) Georgia - Amy Mulkey; Illinois - Erika Harold; Nevada - Teresa Benitez
Talent	Oklahoma - Casey Preslar; Indiana - Tangra Riggle; Maryland - Camille Lewis

==== Quality of Life awards ====
Results	Contestant	Platform
Winner	Nevada - Teresa Benitez	Poverty: A N.E.W. Focus

== Delegates ==
51 contestants competed for the title:

State	Name	Hometown	Age^{1}	Talent	Placement	Awards	Notes
Alabama	Scarlotte Deupree	Birmingham	22	Vocal	1st runner-up	Quality of Life 1st runner-up	
Alaska	Peggy Willman	Anchorage	23	Alaskan Native Dance			
Arizona	Laura Lawless	Tempe	23	Classical Piano	Top 15		New York's Junior Miss 1996
Arkansas	Lauren Davidson	El Dorado	20	Vocal			
California	Jennifer Glover	Castro Valley	23	Contemporary Vocal			Miss California USA 2001
Colorado	Morgan O'Murray	Colorado Springs	21	Jazz Dance			Miss Colorado Teen USA 1999
Connecticut	Tanisha Brito	New London	22	Tap Dance	Top 10		Miss Georgia USA 2005
Delaware	Shoha Parekh	Newark	24	Bharatnatyam Style Dance			
District of Columbia	Sarah-Elizabeth Langford	Atlanta, GA	23	Gymnastics			Miss District of Columbia USA 2005
Florida	Katherine Carson	Sarasota	20	Vocal			
Georgia	Amy Mulkey	Gainesville	23	Classical Piano			
Hawaii	Kehaulani Christian	Pearl City	23	Tahitian Dance			
Idaho	Misty Taylor	Boise	20	Classical Vocal			
Illinois	Erika Harold	Urbana	22	Operatic Aria	Winner	Preliminary Interview	
Indiana	Tangra Riggle	West Lafayette	21	Contemporary Vocal	Top 15	Preliminary Talent	
Iowa	Stephanie Moore	Okoboji	22	Vocal			
Kansas	Jeanne Anne Schroeder	Hutchinson	24	Classical Vocal			
Kentucky	Mary Catherine Correll	Somerset	21	Classical Vocal			
Louisiana	Casey Jo Crowder	Shreveport	23	Vocal			
Maine	Rachel Wadsworth	Hiram	20	Rhythm Tap Dance			
Maryland	Camille Lewis	Silver Spring	21	Crossover Classical Violin	4th runner-up	Overall Talent, Preliminary Talent, Preliminary Evening Gown	
Massachusetts	Melanie Correia	Acushnet	22	Vocal	Top 10		
Michigan	Erin Moss	Stevensville	21	Flute			
Minnesota	Allyson Kearns	Eden Prairie	22	Self-Choreographed Dance			
Mississippi	Jennifer Adcock	Hattiesburg	22	Piano	Top 10	Preliminary Swimsuit	Miss Mississippi USA 2005 and Top 10 at Miss USA 2005
Missouri	Shandi Finnessey	Florissant	24	Piano Solo		Preliminary Evening Gown	Miss Missouri USA 2004 and Miss USA 2004
Montana	Heather Rathbun	Darby	24	Tae Kwon Do Demonstration			
Nebraska	Krista Knicely	Omaha	23	Jazz Dance			
Nevada	Teresa Benitez	Reno	24	Monologue	3rd runner-up	Quality of Life, Overall Interview, Preliminary Interview	
New Hampshire	Mary Morin	Bedford	24	Classical Piano			
New Jersey	Alicia Luciano	Stanhope	19	Lyrical Dance		Overall Gown, Preliminary Evening Gown	
New Mexico	Erin Griggs	Alamogordo	22	Violin Solo			
New York	Tiffany Walker	Brooklyn	22	Interpretive Modern Dance	Top 10	Preliminary Swimsuit	
North Carolina	Misty Clymer	Raleigh	21	Semi-classical Vocal	Top 15		
North Dakota	Stacey Thomas	Bismarck	19	Jazz en Pointe			Miss North Dakota Teen USA 2001
Ohio	Tiffany Haas	Cincinnati	20	Classical Vocal		Quality of Life 2nd runner-up	
Oklahoma	Casey Preslar	Tulsa	22	Jazz Vocal	2nd runner-up	Preliminary Talent	
Oregon	Brita Stream	Eugene	22	Vocal			
Pennsylvania	Autumn Marisa	Waynesburg	22	Lyrical Dance			
Rhode Island	Gianine Teti	Providence	22	Classical Vocal			
South Carolina	Kelly McCorkle	Greenville	23	Lyrical Ballet	Top 15		The Amazing Race 7 contestant
South Dakota	Vanessa Short Bull	Rapid City	23	Ballet en Pointe			Miss South Dakota USA 2000
Tennessee	Valli Kugler	Rutherford	22	Vocal			
Texas	Mary Lisa Dalzell	Magnolia	23	Flute solo	Top 10	Preliminary Interview	
Utah	Natalie Johnson	Bountiful	22	Classical Piano			
Vermont	Sarah Jo Willey	Bakersfield	24	Vocal			
Virginia	Jennifer Pitts	Arlington	24	Contemporary Ballet En Pointe			Miss Virginia USA 2005
Washington	Amanda Beers	Richland	20	Classical Piano	Top 15		
West Virginia	Janna Kerns	Terra Alta	23	Vocal			
Wisconsin	Jayme Dawicki	New Berlin	22	Classical Piano			
Wyoming	Beth Holland	Gillette	23	Vocal			

^{1} Age as of September 2002
