= Jennifer Berry =

American beauty pageant titleholder

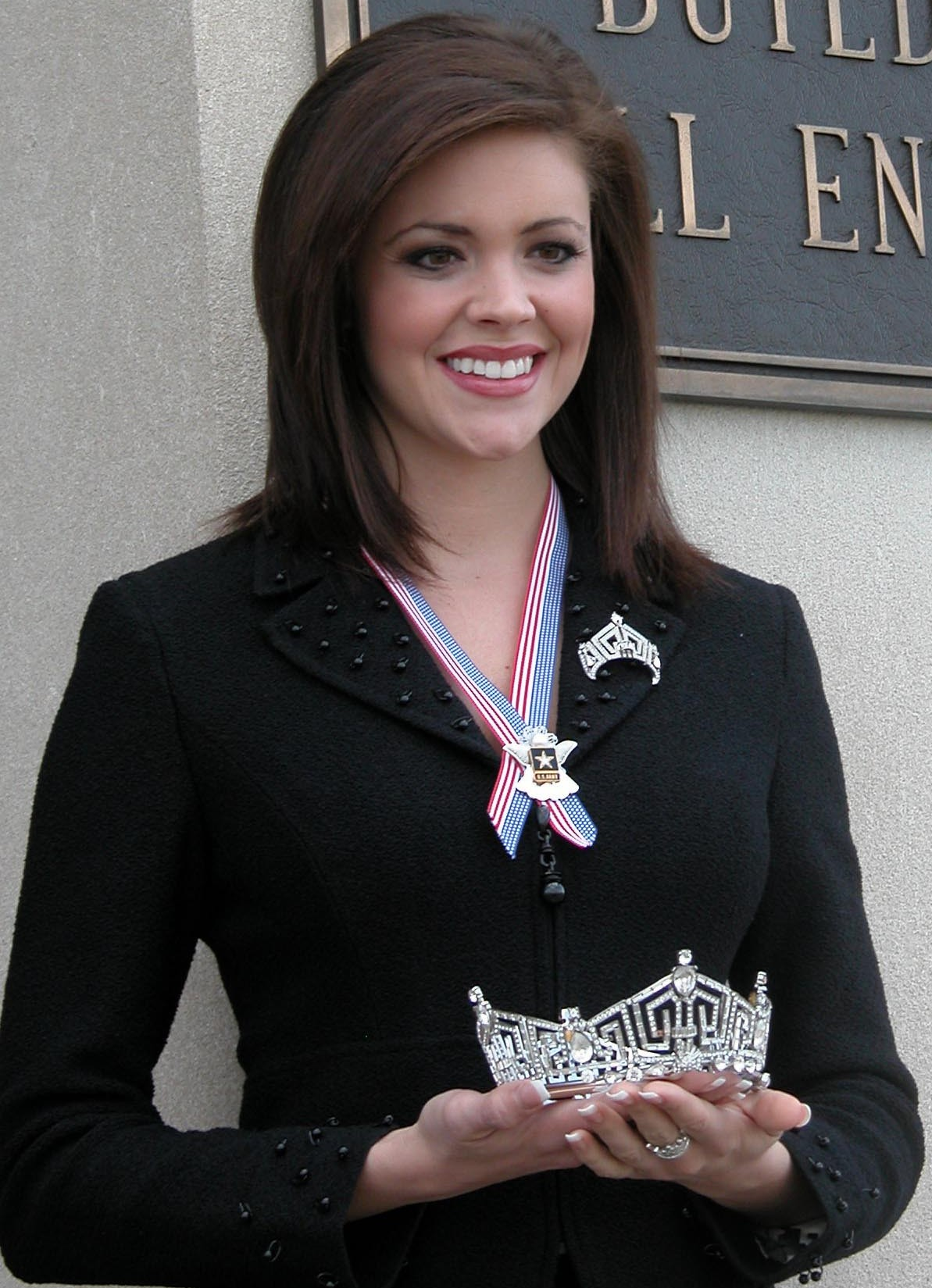
- Born: July 18, 1983 (age 43); Houston, Texas, U.S.
- Education: University of Oklahoma
- Title: Miss Grand Lake 2005; Miss Oklahoma 2005; Miss America 2006
- Term: January 21, 2006 - January 29, 2007
- Predecessor: Deidre Downs
- Successor: Lauren Nelson
- Spouse: Nathan Gooden (m. 2007)
- Children: 4

Jennifer Berry-Gooden (born July 18, 1983) is an American beauty pageant titleholder who was crowned Miss America on January 21, 2006. A resident of Tulsa, Oklahoma, at the time of her investment to sovereignty of beauty, she became the fifth Miss America from Oklahoma to have held the title.

== Early life and education ==
Berry was born in Houston, Texas. She graduated from Jenks High School in 2001, and attended the University of Oklahoma with a major in elementary education. She expressed hopes to attain a Master's in education and become an elementary school teacher after her reign as Miss America.

== Pageants ==
=== Miss Oklahoma 2005 ===
She won the Miss Oklahoma 2005 title in a state pageant held at Tulsa on June 11, 2005. She competed as Miss Grand Lake 2005 and was a double preliminary winner, winning awards for both talent and swimsuit. This was Berry's fifth attempt at the state title, as she placed third runner-up in 2004 and 2003, made the top 10 in 2002 and was unplaced in 2001.

=== Miss America 2006 ===
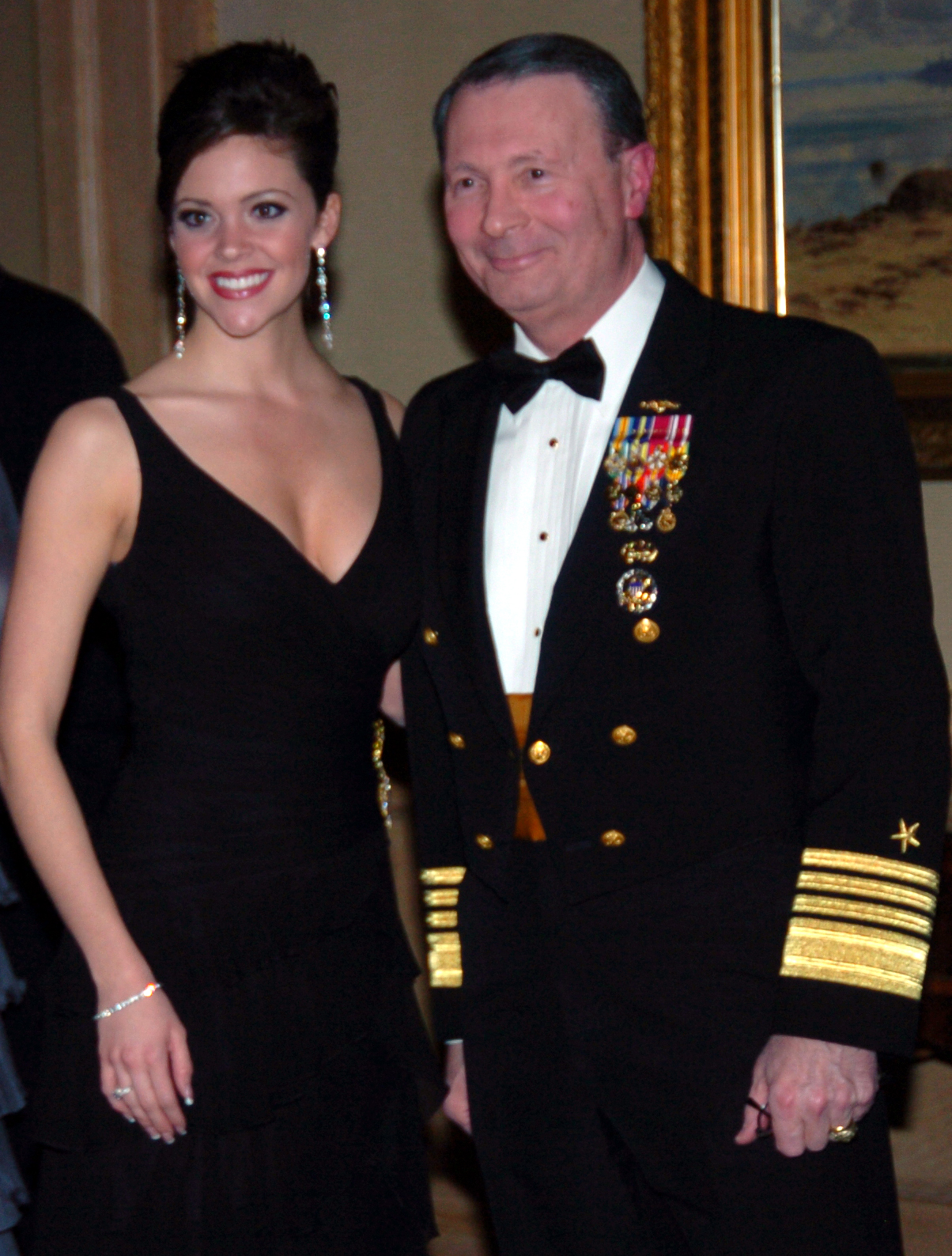
Jennifer Berry and United States Navy Admiral Edmund Giambastiani, vice chairman of the Joint Chiefs of Staff at the United Service Organizations of Metropolitan Washington annual awards dinner March 22, 2006

Berry represented Oklahoma in the Miss America 2006 pageant broadcast from the Theatre for the Performing Arts on the Las Vegas Strip during January 21, 2006, the first occasion the pageant was held outside of Atlantic City, New Jersey. During the preliminary competitions Berry won a preliminary talent award for her ballet en pointe performance. At the end of the final night of competition, which involved interview, swimsuit, evening gown and talent competitions, Berry won the Miss America 2006 title, the first titleholder to be crowned outside Atlantic City.

Her platform issue as Miss Oklahoma and Miss America was "Building Intolerance to Drunk Driving and Underage Drinking." She acted as a national spokesperson for Mothers Against Drunk Driving during her reign, and also worked on behalf of numerous other charities. Berry also had the opportunity to host the second annual Miss America's Outstanding Teen pageant held in Orlando, Florida.

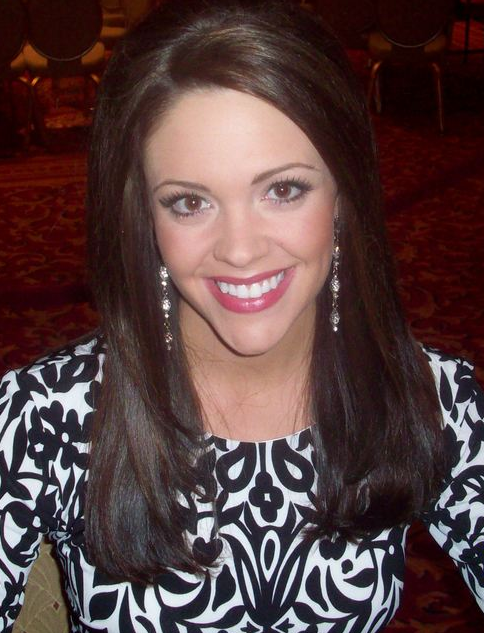
Berry signing autographs at a Miss America 2008 event

== Personal life ==
She is a member of the Churches of Christ. She currently lives in Seattle, Washington. On April 28, 2007, she married Nathan Gooden in her hometown of Tulsa.

Awards and achievements
Preceded by Deidre Downs	Miss America; 2006	Succeeded by Lauren Nelson
Preceded by Elizabeth Kinney	Miss Oklahoma; 2005	Succeeded by Jennifer Warren
