= Susan Powell (Miss America) =

American actress, singer, and TV personality (born 1959)

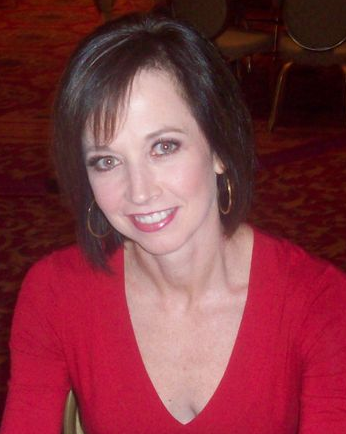
- Susan Powell signing autographs at a Miss America event in January 2008
- Born: March 24, 1959 (age 67); Elk City, Oklahoma, U.S.
- Education: Oklahoma City University
- Occupations: Actress; singer; television personality
- Years active: 1980–present
- Title: Miss Oklahoma City 1980; Miss Oklahoma 1980; Miss America 1981
- Predecessor: Cheryl Prewitt
- Successor: Elizabeth Gracen

Susan Carol Powell (born March 24, 1959) is an American actress, singer, and television personality. A native of Elk City, Oklahoma, Powell began her career as a successful beauty pageant contestant, winning the Miss Oklahoma pageant in 1980 and proceeded to the Miss America crown for the year 1981. A coloratura soprano, she has performed in musical theater and on opera stages around the world. In 1993, Powell embarked on a new television career, becoming the co-host of Discovery Channel's Home Matters home and garden program in 1993.

== Biography ==
Powell was born and raised in Elk City, Oklahoma, an 11,000 resident town driven by farming, ranching and oil production. Early on, Powell discovered a talent for singing and with the encouragement of her family, pursued it. As a child she sang in local venues, at church functions, and solo singing competitions.

She attended Oklahoma City University, where she studied vocal music under Florence Birdwell and performed in summer stock at the Lyric Theatre of Oklahoma.

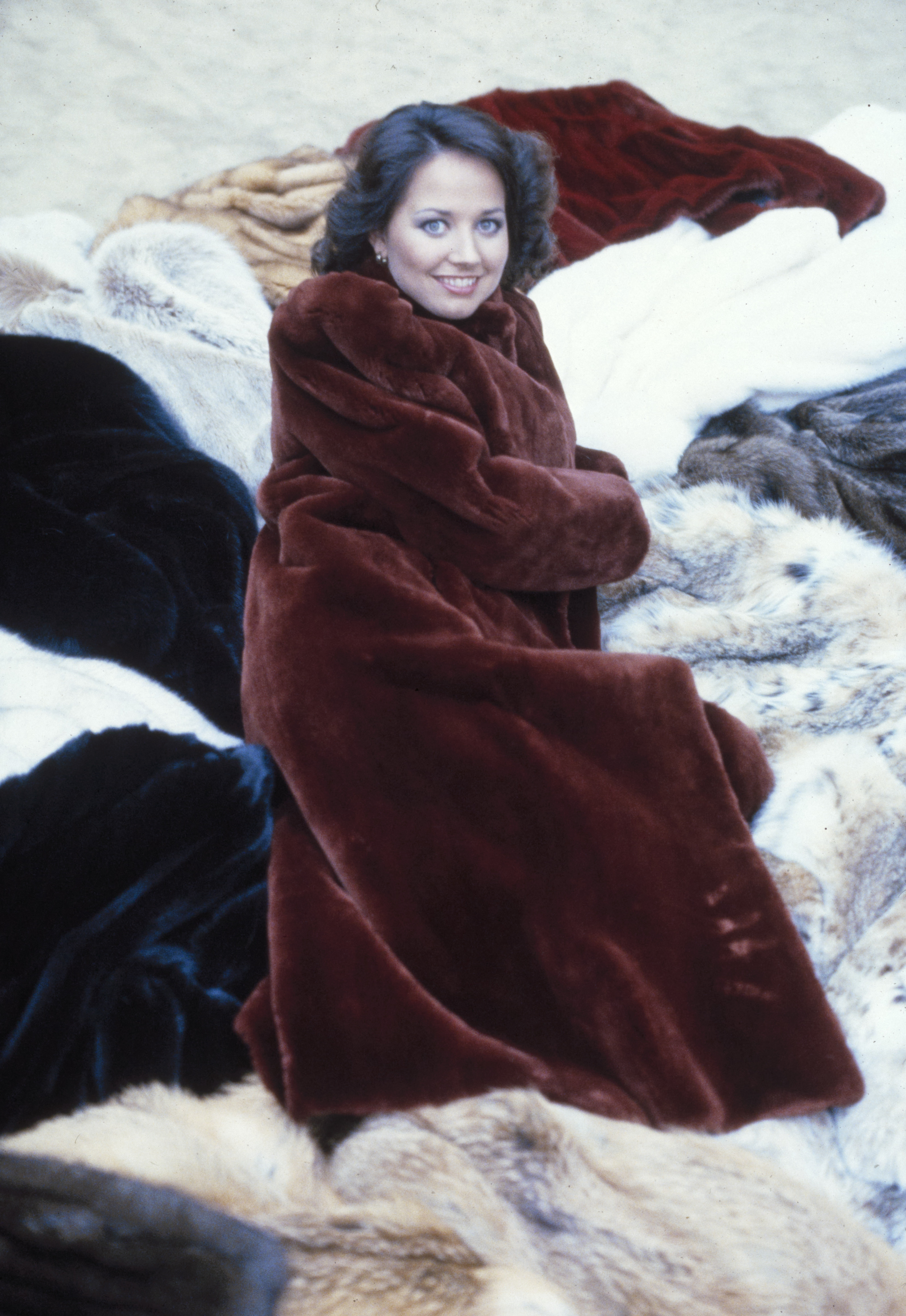
Susan Powell, Miss America 1981, in brown fur coat.

After first being crowned Miss Oklahoma, Powell won the 1981 national competition, being named Miss America in September 1980 in Atlantic City, New Jersey.

After her one-year reign, Powell embarked on a singing career, debuting with Seattle Opera in the role of Adele in Die Fledermaus. Calling her performance the "major surprise of the evening," a reviewer from Opera Canada praised "her sparkling stage personality" and pronounced her technique as "fully up to Adele's coloratura requirements." Powell's opera career took her to the New York City Opera to the New Japan Philharmonic. She has sung as a soloist for John Williams and the Boston Pops.

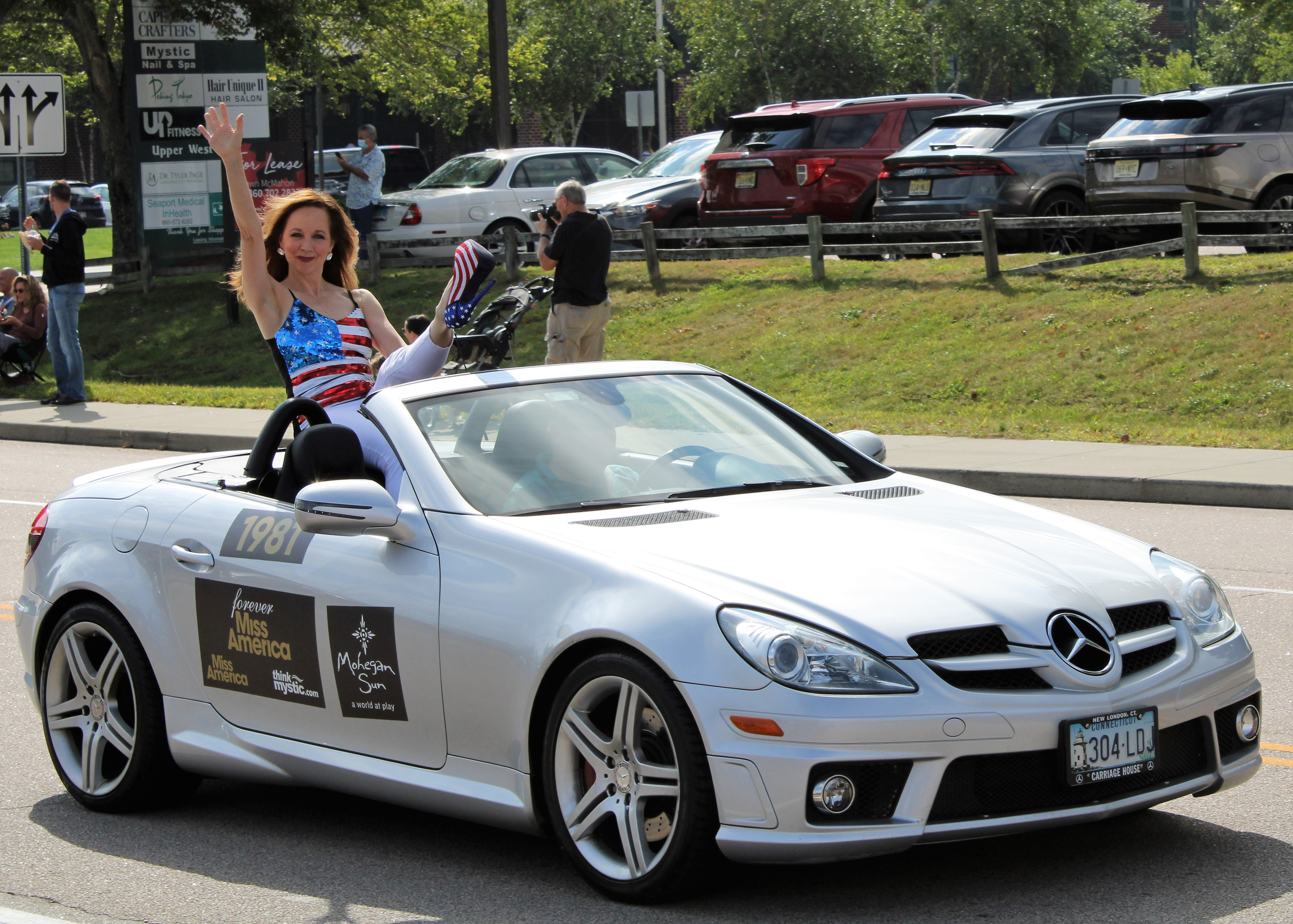
Miss America 1981 Susan Powell in the 2021 Show Us Your Shoes Parade in Mystic, Connecticut

In 1993, Powell introduced the television series Home Matters on the Discovery Channel, which she hosted for nine seasons. Powell continues to tour and lecture, assisting in local preliminary Miss America contests and being one of the judges for the Miss America pageant in 2007. In 2002, Powell was recognized by the Oklahoma Hall of Fame as an Ambassador of Good Will from the state for the second time, the first such recognition occurring in 1981.

Powell performed on the television program Don't Forget the Lyrics in the episode of December 12, 2008, appearing along with Heather French Henry (Miss America 2000) and Kirsten Haglund (Miss America 2008).

Awards and achievements
Preceded by Cheryl Prewitt	Miss America; 1981	Succeeded by Elizabeth Ward
Preceded by Jill Elmore	Miss Oklahoma; 1980	Succeeded by Kathleen Allin
