= Casey Preslar =

American beauty pageant contestant

- Occupation: Beauty pageant contestant
- Known for: Winning Miss Oklahoma 2002

Casey Preslar Urwin is a beauty pageant contestant who won Miss Oklahoma 2002 and was second runner up at Miss America 2003 where she came in second in the swimsuit competition and first in talent.

She began entering pageants in 1997 as a means of paying for school. She graduated from Oral Roberts and lives in Austin, Texas.
