= Miss America 1981 =

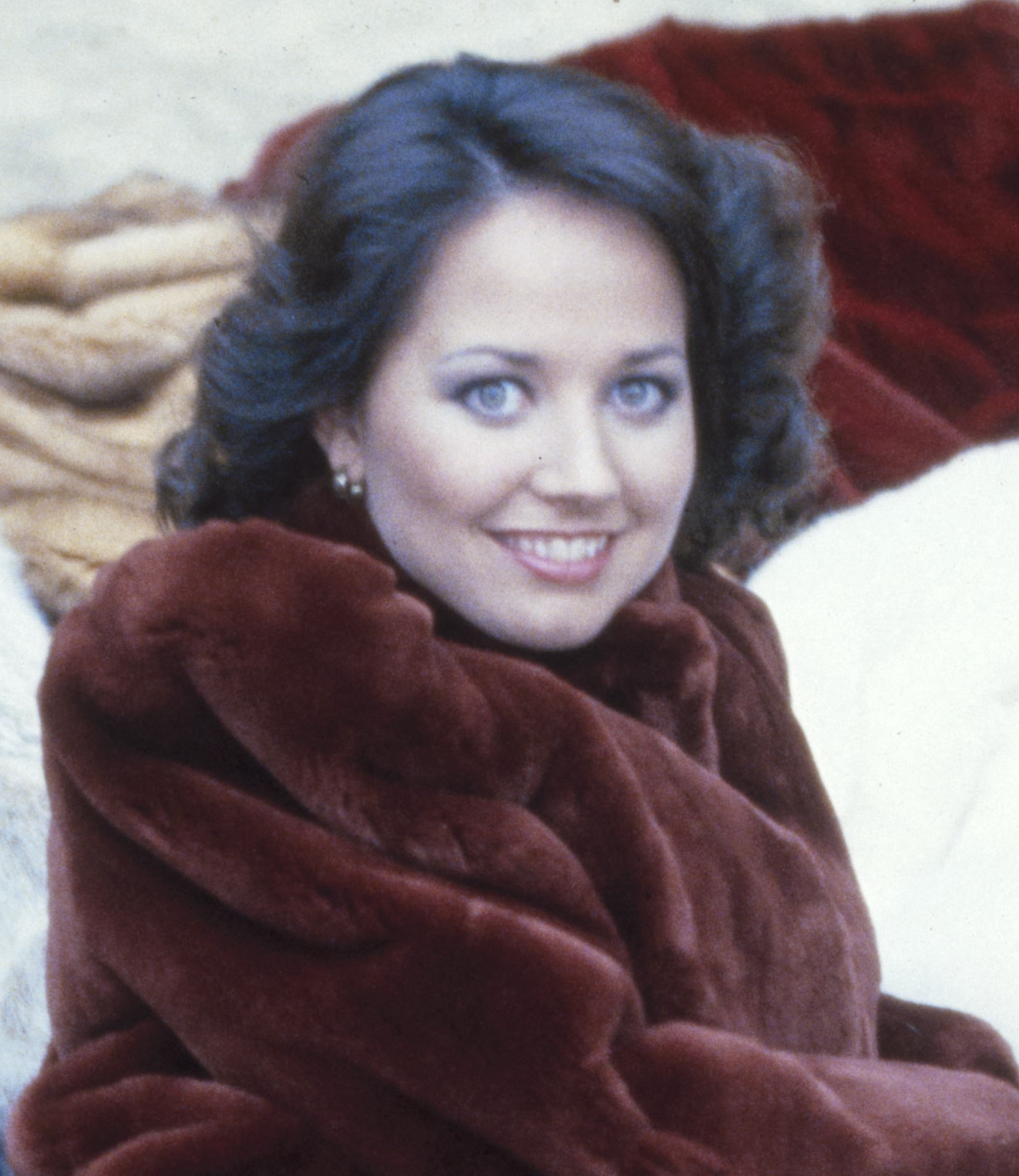
- Susan Powell, Miss America 1981
- Date: September 6, 1980
- Presenters: Ron Ely
- Venue: Boardwalk Hall, Atlantic City, New Jersey
- Broadcaster: NBC
- Winner: Susan Powell; Oklahoma

Miss America 1981, the 54th Miss America pageant, was held at the Boardwalk Hall in Atlantic City, New Jersey on September 6, 1980 on NBC Network. It was the first time Ron Ely hosted, replacing Bert Parks who had hosted for 25 years. It was also historic as two black women, Lencola Sullivan of Arkansas and Doris Hayes of Washington, made the finals for the first time.

The winner, Susan Powell of Oklahoma, later became co-host of the series Home Matters on the Discovery Channel.

== Results ==
=== Placements ===
Placement	Contestant
Miss America 1981	Oklahoma – Susan Powell
1st Runner-Up	Alabama – Paige Phillips
2nd Runner-Up	Mississippi – Donna Pope; New Jersey – Therese Hanley
4th Runner-Up	Arkansas – Lencola Sullivan
Top 10	Connecticut – Jeanne Caruso; New York – Cheryl Flanagan; Ohio – Kathleen "Kathy" Vernon; Texas – Terri Eoff; Washington – Doris Hayes

=== Preliminary awards ===
Awards	Contestant
Lifestyle and Fitness	Arkansas - Lencola Sullivan; Minnesota - Debra Goodwin; Mississippi - Donna Pope
Talent	Alabama - Paige Phillips; (New York (state)) New York - Cheryl Flanagan; Oklahoma - Susan Powell (tie); (Washington (state)) Washington - Doris Hayes (tie)

=== Other awards ===
Awards	Contestant
Non-finalist Talent	Colorado - Kimberly Christiansen; Illinois - Blythe Sawyer; Maryland - Lisa Marie Daskal; Massachusetts - Amy Linder; Minnesota - Debra Goodwin; Montana - Lilly Cruise; Nebraska - Paula Louise Mitchell; North Carolina - Janet Ward Black; Oregon - Teresa Richardson; Vermont - Carole Spolar

== Delegates ==
State	Name	Hometown	Age	Talent	Placement	Awards	Notes
Alabama	Paige Phillips	Leeds	17	Vocal/Ventriloquism to "Rock-a-Bye Your Baby with a Dixie Melody" by Al Jolson	1st runner-up	Preliminary Talent	
Alaska	Sandra Lashbrook	Eagle River					
Arizona	Brenda Strong	Tempe					Actress in Desperate Housewives
Arkansas	Lencola Sullivan	Morrilton	21	Vocal, "St. Louis Blues", composed by W.C. Handy	4th runner-up	Preliminary Swimsuit	First African-American contestant to place as a runner-up at Miss America
California	Robin Brooks	Elverta					
Colorado	Kimberly Christiansen	Arvada				Non-finalist Talent	
Connecticut	Jeanne Caruso	Trumbull	21	Vocal/piano, Original song, "A Song for Tomorrow"	Top 10		divorced Joe Theismann
Delaware	Andra Lee Dickerson	Newark					
Florida	Caroline Dungan	Bradenton					
(Georgia (U.S. state)) Georgia	Lynn Smith	Savannah					
Hawaii	Kanoelehua Cook	Aiea					
Idaho	Leslie Taylor	Burley					
Illinois	Blythe Sawyer	Naperville				Non-finalist Talent	
Indiana	Teri Kardatzke	Anderson					
Iowa	Jane Patton	Council Bluffs					
Kansas	K. Leann Folsom	Wichita					
Kentucky	Daphne Cochran	Louisville					
Louisiana	Martha "Missy" Crews	Baton Rouge					
Maine	Valerie Crooker	Brunswick					Miss Maine USA 1979
Maryland	Lisa Marie Daskal	Cumberland				Non-finalist Talent	
Massachusetts	Amy Linder	Lowell				Non-finalist Talent	
Michigan	Heidi Hepler	Livonia					
Minnesota	Debra Goodwin	Austin				Preliminary Swimsuit, Non-finalist Talent	
Mississippi	Donna Pope	McNeil	24	Ballet on pointe to Overture from "Oklahoma!"	2nd runner-up (tie)	Preliminary Swimsuit	
Missouri	Carla LaFevre	Harrisonville					
Montana	Lilly Cruise	Miles City				Non-finalist Talent	
Nebraska	Paula Louise Mitchell	Norfolk				Non-finalist Talent	
Nevada	Phyllis Hamlin	Reno					
New Hampshire	Diane McGarry	Manchester					
New Jersey	Therese Hanley	Jersey City		"Starting Here, Starting Now" by Barbra Streisand	2nd runner-up (tie)		
New Mexico	Teresa Elizabeth Anderson	Hobbs					
(New York (state)) New York	Cheryl Flanagan	Rochester	18	Tap dance to Overture from "That's Entertainment, Part II"	Top 10	Preliminary Talent	
North Carolina	Janet Black	Kannapolis				Non-finalist Talent	Top 5 at Maid of Cotton 1980. Janet Ward Black died at the age of 66 on November 2, 2025 in Greensboro, North Carolina.
North Dakota	Karen Moe	Minot					
Ohio	Kathleen "Kathy" Ann Vernon	Youngstown	24	Vocal, "I Have Dreamed" from The King and I	Top 10		Kathleen "Kathy" Ann Vernon died at age 68 on August 23, 2024 after a battle with pancreatic cancer in Malvern, Pennsylvania.
Oklahoma	Susan Powell	Elk City	21	Operatic vocal, "Lucy's Aria" from Gian Carlo Menotti's opera "The Telephone"	Miss America 1981	Preliminary Talent (tie)	
Oregon	Teresa Richardson	Forest Grove				Non-finalist Talent	
Pennsylvania	Anita Ellen Patton	Lebanon					
Rhode Island	Dawn Potter	Pascoag					
South Carolina	Donna Jewell	Columbia					
South Dakota	Carol Barnett	Sioux Falls					
Tennessee	Sarah Leonard	Jonesborough					
Texas	Terri Eoff	Lubbock	19	Dramatic Monologue from "A Bad Play for an Old Lady" by Elizabeth Lovett	Top 10		
Utah	Jean Bullard	Provo					
Vermont	Carole Spolar	St. Albans				Non-finalist Talent	
Virginia	Holly Jereme	Roanoke					
(Washington (state)) Washington	Doris Hayes	Tacoma	20	Vocal, "Our Love Is Here to Stay" by George Gershwin	Top 10	Preliminary Talent (tie)	First African-American preliminary winner
West Virginia	Pamela Ellen Paugh	Charleston					Aunt of JonBenét Ramsey, Sister of Miss West Virginia 1977
Wisconsin	Dana Spychalla	Appleton					
Wyoming	Susan Pennington	Casper					
