= Miss Oklahoma =

Beauty pageant competition

- Formation: 1923
- Type: Beauty pageant
- Headquarters: Tulsa
- Location: Oklahoma
- Members: Miss America
- Official language: English
- Website: Official website

The Miss Oklahoma competition selects a winner to compete on behalf of Oklahoma in the Miss America pageant. Miss Oklahoma has won the Miss America crown on five occasions. Also, in the years when city representatives were common, Norma Smallwood won, competing as Miss Tulsa, giving the state of Oklahoma a total of six crowns. Oklahoma is also one of three states to win back to back Miss America titles.

Jaselyn Rossman of Sapulpa was crowned Miss Oklahoma on June 13, 2026, at Rose State Performing Arts Center in Rose State College in Midwest City. She competed for the title of Miss America 2027 on September 6, 2026, at the Kravis Center for the Performing Arts in West Palm Beach, Florida.

== Gallery of past titleholders ==
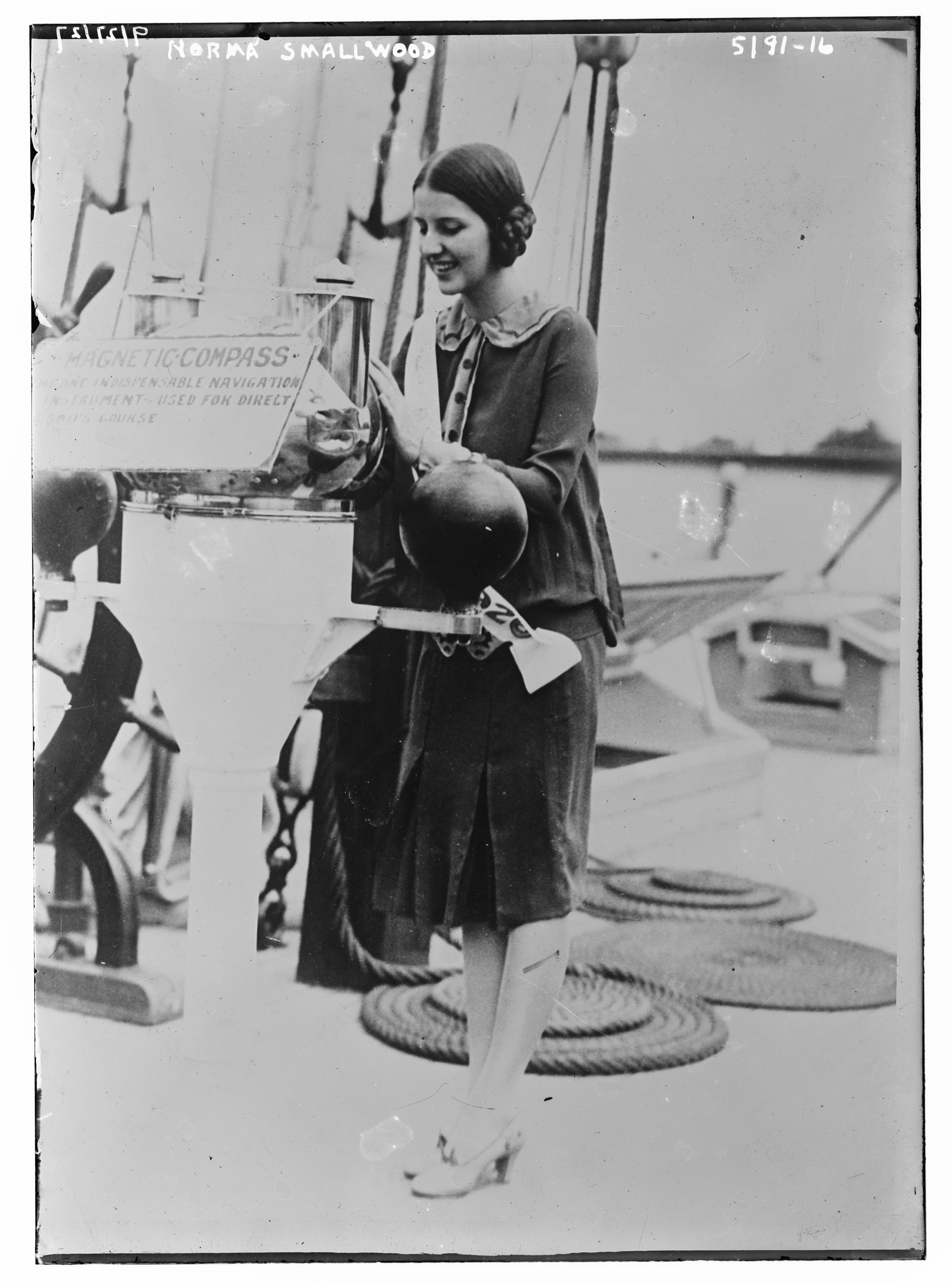
Norma Smallwood,
Miss Tulsa 1926 and Miss America 1926

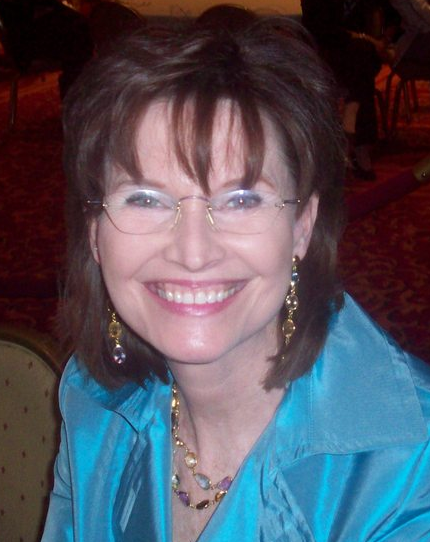
Jane Jayroe,
Miss Oklahoma 1966 and Miss America 1967 in 2008

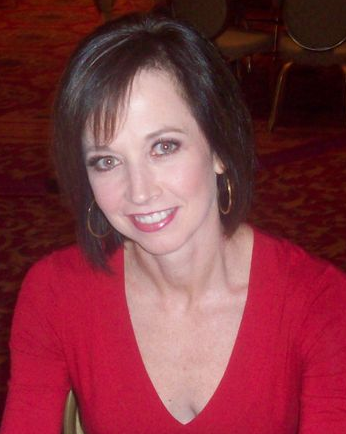
Susan Powell,
Miss Oklahoma 1980 and Miss America 1981 in 2008

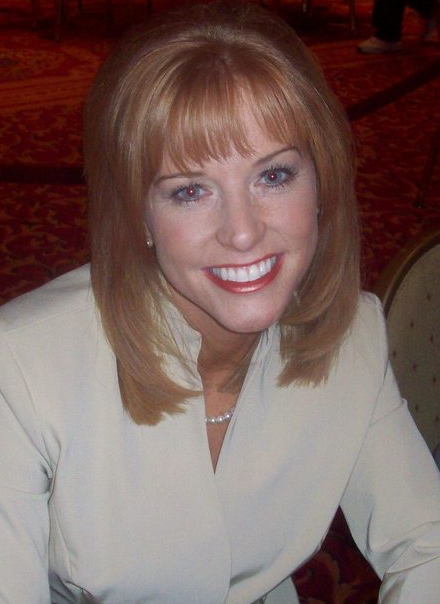
Shawntel Smith,
Miss Oklahoma 1995 and Miss America 1996 in 2008

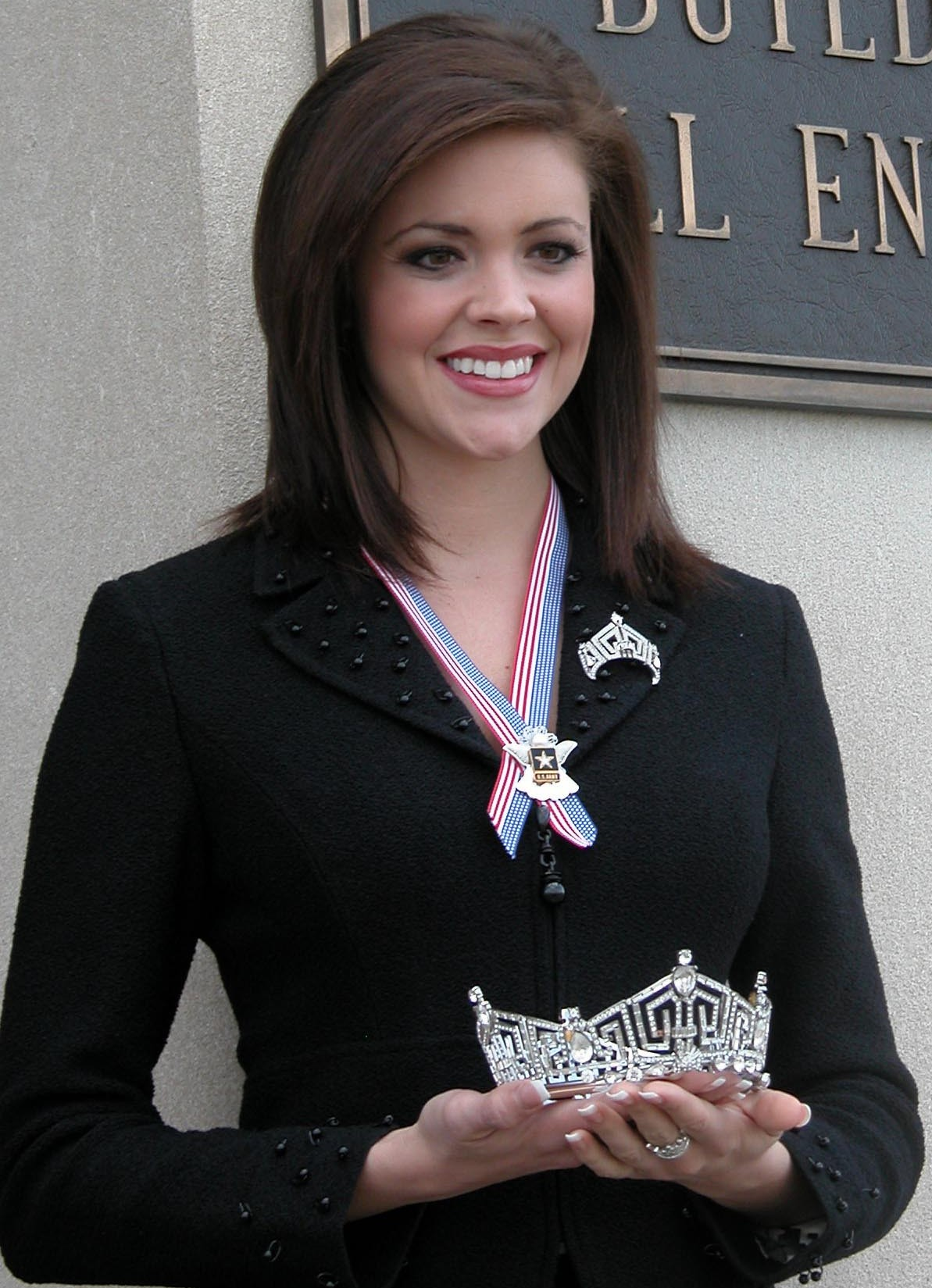
Jennifer Berry,
Miss Oklahoma 2005 and Miss America 2006

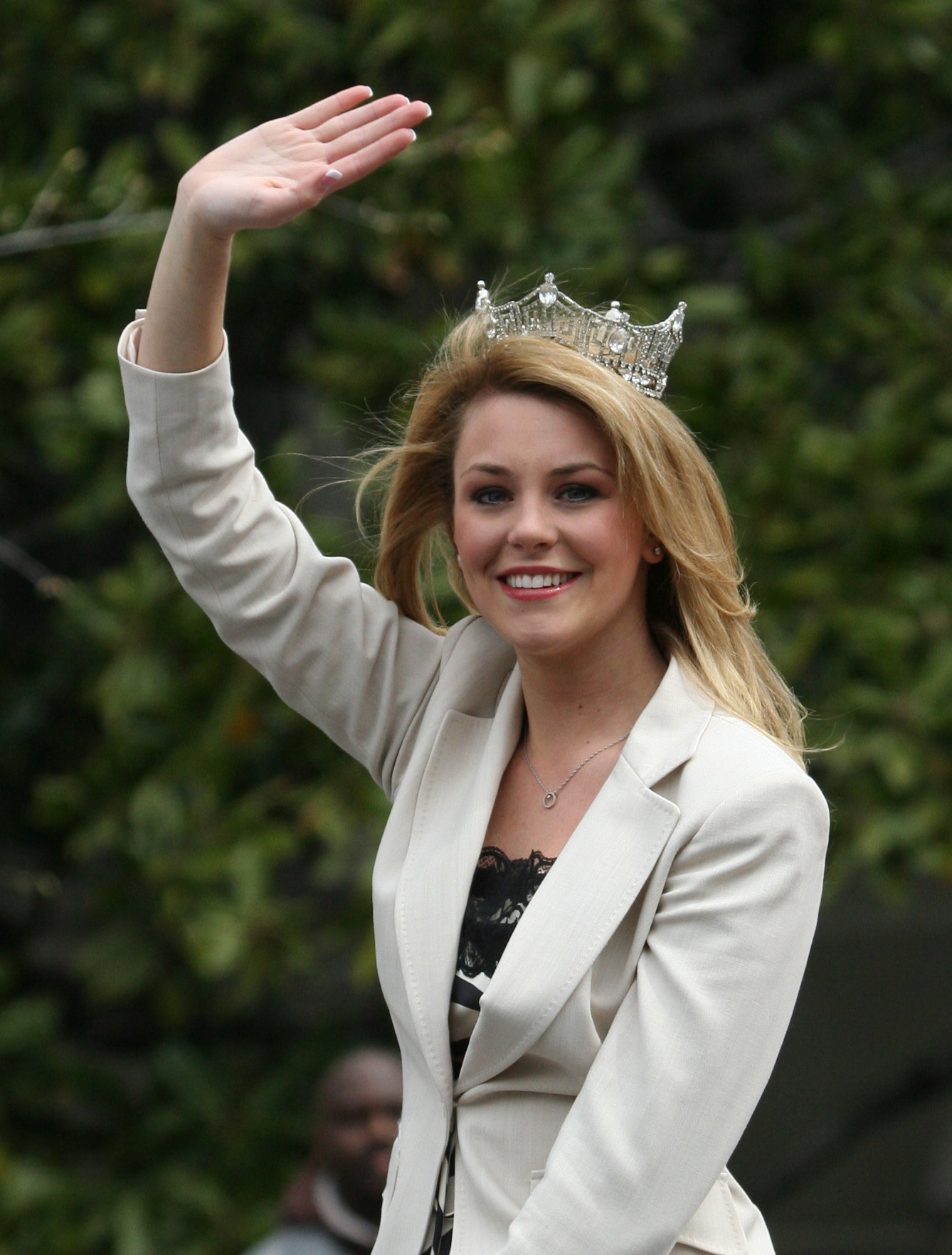
Lauren Nelson,
Miss Oklahoma 2006 and Miss America 2007

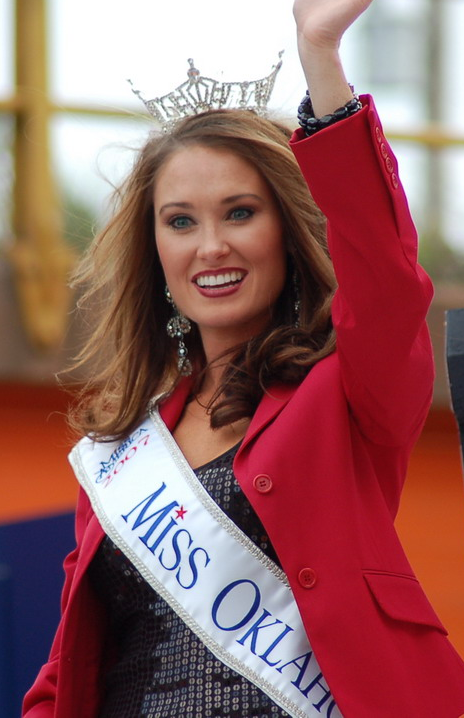
Makenna Smith,
Miss Oklahoma 2007

== Results summary ==
The following is a visual summary of the past results of Miss Oklahoma titleholders at the national Miss America pageants/competitions. The year in parentheses indicates the year of the national competition during which a placement and/or award was garnered, not the year attached to the contestant's state title.

=== Placements ===
- Miss Americas: Norma Smallwood** (1926), Jane Anne Jayroe (1967), Susan Powell (1981), Shawntel Smith (1996), Jennifer Berry (2006), Lauren Nelson (2007)
- 1st runners-up: Bettye Cornelia Avert (1939), Betty Thompson (2012)
- 2nd runners-up: Nancy Denner (1958), Anita Bryant (1959), Lori Kelley (1989), Casey Preslar (2003), Alicia Clifton (2013), Kelsey Griswold (2014)
- 3rd runners-up: Addison Price (2020)
- 4th runners-up: Donna Briggs (1948), Louise O'Brien (1951), Ann Campbell (1956), Nancy Chapman (1983), DuSharme Carter (1993), Emoly West (2011)
- Top 5: Virginia Howard** (1927)
- Top 10: Willie Mae Stockton* (1924), Bobby Jene Simmons (1952), Judy Adams (1971), Andrea Hanson (1974), Tamara Marler (1990), Cynthia White (1991), Julie Payne (1999), Kelley Scott (2004), Elizabeth Kinney (2005), Alexandra Eppler (2015), Georgia Frazier (2016)
- Top 12: Taylor Treat (2010), Sarah Klein (2017)
- Top 15: Ada Martyne Wood (1940), Mifaunwy Dolores Shunatona (1941), Ashley Thompson (2018)
- Top 20: Kaci Hundley (2002)

Oklahoma holds a record of 39 placements at Miss America.

=== Awards ===
==== Preliminary awards ====
- Preliminary Lifestyle and Fitness: Norma Smallwood** (1926), Ann Campbell (1956), Lauren Nelson (2007), Emoly West (2011), Kelsey Griswold (2014), Alexandra Eppler (2015)
- Preliminary Talent: Jane Anne Jayroe (1967), Judy Adams (1971), Susan Powell (1981) (tie), Lori Kelley (1989), Tamara Marler (1990), Julie Payne (1999), Casey Preslar (2003), Jennifer Berry (2006), Betty Thompson (2012), Alicia Clifton (2013)

==== Non-finalist awards ====
- Non-finalist Talent: Mary Ann Hazelton (1960), Jill Elmore (1980), Mignon Merchant (1987), Leesa Cornett (1988), Amy Duncan (1997), Kelli Masters (1998), Kristin Steveson (2001)

==== Other awards ====
- Miss Congeniality: Mifaunwy Dolores Shunatona (1941), Shirley Barbour (1953)
- America's Choice: Taylor Treat (2010), Betty Thompson (2012)
- Charles & Theresa Brown Scholarship: Alexandra Eppler (2015)
- Quality of Life Award Winners: Taylor Treat (2010)
- Quality of Life Award 1st Runners-up: Jennifer Berry (2006)
- Quality of Life Award Finalists: Alexandra Eppler (2015), Sarah Klein (2017)
- Special Judges' Award: Susan Supernaw (1972)

* Competed as Miss Oklahoma City
** Competed as Miss Tulsa

== Winners ==
- Declared as winner
- Ended as a runner-up
- Ended as a finalist or semi-finalist

Year	Name	Hometown	Age	Local Title	Miss America Talent	Placement at Miss America	Special scholarships at Miss America	Notes
2026	Jaselyn Rossman	Sapulpa	22	Miss Tulsa State Fair	Dance			Previously Miss Oklahoma Teen USA 2023; Top 20 at Miss Teen USA 2023
2025	Tessa Dorrell	Jones	22	Miss Broken Arrow	HERStory Monologue			
2024	Lauren Frost	Wagoner	24	Miss Bricktown	Clogging, "Hound Dog"	Top 11		
2023	Sunny Marie Day	Norman	27	Miss Norman	Vocal			
2022	Megan Kathleen Gold	Edmond	22	Miss Bricktown	Flute			
2021	Ashleigh Robinson	Oklahoma City	23	Miss Oklahoma City	Vocal			
2019–20 (Note: Titleholder extended to a second full year in 2020 after state and national pageants postponed to 2021 due to the COVID-19 pandemic)	Addison Price	Edmond	20	Miss Tulsa	Jazz Dance, Medley of "Diamonds are a Girl's Best Friend"	3rd runner-up		Previously Miss Oklahoma's Outstanding Teen 2016 Assumed state title from Miss America's Outstanding Teen 2017, Nicole Jia
2018	Ashley Thompson	Oklahoma City	23	Miss Edmond LibertyFest	Tap Dance, "Like That"	Top 15		
2017	Triana Browne	Tulsa	24	Miss Oklahoma City	Vocal, "Summertime"			Later Miss Oklahoma USA 2019; 2nd runner-up at Miss USA 2019 pageant
2016	Sarah Klein	Tulsa	24	Miss Tulsa	Piano	Top 12	Quality of Life Award Finalist	2nd runner up at National Sweetheart 2015 pageant
2015	Georgia Frazier	Tulsa	23	Miss Ada	Vocal, "Happy Days Are Here Again"	Top 10		Previously Miss Oklahoma's Outstanding Teen 2009 Top 16 at National Sweetheart 2014 pageant
2014	Alexandra Eppler	Edmond	24	Miss Enid	Dance, "Titanium"	Top 10	Charles & Theresa Brown Scholarship Preliminary Lifestyle & Fitness Award Quality of Life Award Finalist	
2013	Kelsey Griswold	Tulsa	20	Miss Bricktown	Vocal, "Everybody Says Don't" from Anyone Can Whistle	2nd runner-up	Preliminary Lifestyle & Fitness Award	
2012	Alicia Clifton	Oklahoma City	20	Miss Edmond LibertyFest	Tap Dance, "Can't Buy Me Love"	2nd runner-up	Preliminary Talent Award	Previously Miss Oklahoma's Outstanding Teen 2008; Top 10 at Miss America's Outstanding Teen 2009
2011	Betty Thompson	Davenport	22	Miss Oklahoma State University	Irish Step Dance, "Warriors" by Ronan Hardiman	1st runner-up	America's Choice Preliminary Talent Award	
2010	Emoly West	Edmond	24	Miss Edmond LibertyFest	Ballet en Pointe, "Time" by Billy Porter	4th runner-up	Preliminary Lifestyle & Fitness Award	
2009	Taylor Kaitlyn Treat	Ada	22	Miss University of Oklahoma	Ballet en Pointe, "Palladio"	Top 12	America's Choice Quality of Life Award Winner	
2008	Kelsey Jane Cartwright	Collinsville	21	Miss Keystone Lake	Lyrical Dance			
2007	Makenna Camille Smith	Oklahoma City	24	Miss Oklahoma City University	Vocal, "Wheels of a Dream" from Ragtime			
2006	Lindsey Miller			Miss Grand Lake	Jazz Vocal	Did not compete; originally 1st runner-up; later assumed title after Nelson won Miss America 2007		
2006	Lauren Nelson	Lawton	20	Miss Oklahoma State Fair	Vocal, "You'll Be in My Heart"	Winner	Preliminary Lifestyle & Fitness Award	Previously Miss Oklahoma's Outstanding Teen 2004
2005	Jennifer Warren		21	Miss Green Country	Vocal	Did not compete; originally 1st runner-up; later assumed the title after Berry won Miss America 2006		
2005	Jennifer Berry	Tulsa	22	Miss Grand Lake	Ballet en Pointe, "Within"	Winner	Preliminary Talent Award Quality of Life Award 1st runner-up	
2004	Elizabeth Kinney	Mooreland	22	Miss Oklahoma State Fair	Tap Dance, "Crazy Little Thing Called Love"	Top 10		
2003	Kelley Scott	Owasso	23	Miss Oklahoma State Fair	Vocal, "Son of a Preacher Man"	Top 10		
2002	Casey Preslar	Tulsa	22	Miss Grand Lake	Jazz Vocal, "You'll Have to Swing It (Mr. Paganini)"	2nd runner-up	Preliminary Talent Award	
2001	Kaci Breann Hundley	Enid	21	Miss Oklahoma State Fair	Vocal, "Crying"	Top 20		
2000	Kristin Steveson	Broken Arrow	23	Miss Tulsa State Fair	Classical Vocal, "Sempre Libera" from La traviata		Non-finalist Talent Award	
1999	Daneka Allen	Oklahoma City	23	Miss Stroud	Vocal, "Respect"			
1998	Julie Payne	Grandfield	23	Miss Collinsville	Tap Dance, "Hound Dog"	Top 10	Preliminary Talent Award	
1997	Kelli Masters	Midwest City	24	Miss Oklahoma City University	Baton Twirling, "Gonna Fly Now"		Non-finalist Talent Award	
1996	Amy Duncan	Oklahoma City	23	Miss University of Oklahoma	Dramatic Vocal, "A Piece of Sky" from Yentl		Non-finalist Talent Award	
1995	Meighen Bradfield					Did not compete; later assumed title after Smith won Miss America 1996		
1995	Shawntel Smith	Muldrow	24	Miss Tulsa State Fair	Vocal, "The Woman in the Moon" from A Star Is Born	Winner		
1994	Tiffany Craig	Norman	24	Miss Norman	Vocal, "If Only"			
1993	Elizabeth Moseley	Norman	22	Miss Shawnee	Flute, "Dueling Banjos"			
1992	DuSharme Carter	Oklahoma City	21	Miss Oklahoma City University	Vocal, "Keepin' Out of Mischief Now"	4th runner-up		Later Miss Oklahoma USA 1995; Top 12 at Miss USA 1995 pageant
1991	Gina Lynne Smith	Stillwater	21	Miss Stroud	Vocal Medley, "Somewhere"			
1990	Cynthia White	Oklahoma City	24	Miss Stroud	Piano, "Rhapsody on a Theme of Paganini"	Top 10		
1989	Tamara Marler	Tulsa	26	Miss Norman	Vocal, "Since I Fell for You"	Top 10	Preliminary Talent Award	
1988	Lori Kelley	Clinton	23	Miss Norman	Classical Vocal, "Una Voce Poco Fa" from The Barber of Seville	2nd runner-up	Preliminary Talent Award	
1987	Leesa Cornett	Newcastle	20	Miss Norman	Vocal, "If He Walked Into My Life" from Mame		Non-finalist Talent Award	
1986	Mignon Merchant	Oklahoma City	25	Miss Lake Hudson	Stand-up Comedy		Non-finalist Talent Award	Previously Miss Oklahoma USA 1983; Top 10 at Miss USA 1983 pageant
1985	Felicia Ferguson	Oklahoma City	24	Miss Grand Lake	Vocal, "You Don't Know Me"			
1984	Julie Sunday	Owasso	21	Miss Owasso	Piano			
1983	Trelynda Kerr	Moore	21	Miss Grand Lake	Country Vocal Medley, "Stand by Your Man"			
1982	Nancy Chapman	Altus	21	Miss Oklahoma City	Piano, "Fireworks" by Debussy	4th runner-up		
1981	April Lynn Clayton	Cameron	22	Miss Tulsa State Fair	Ballet en Pointe, "The Blue Danube"			
1980	Kathleen Allin					Did not compete; originally 2nd runner-up, later assumed the title after Powell won Miss America 1981		
1980	Susan Powell	Elk City	21	Miss Oklahoma City	Classical Vocal, "The Telephone Aria"	Winner	Preliminary Talent Award (tie)	
1979	Jill Elmore	Tulsa	23	Miss Grand Lake	Classical Vocal, "Art Is Calling for Me" from The Enchantress by Victor Herbert		Non-finalist Talent Award	
1978	Kendi Brown	Oklahoma City	21	Miss Warr Acres	Tap Dance, Medley of songs by Cole Porter			
1977	Ellen Wight	Tulsa	22	Miss Oklahoma City University	Classical Vocal, "The Jewel Song" from Faust			Died in December 1979
1976	Lucia Miller	Buffalo	21	Miss Tulsa State Fair	Trumpet, "Won't You Come Home Bill Bailey"			
1975	Lisa Reagan	Oklahoma City	19	Miss Warr Acres	Vocal Medley, "As Time Goes By" & "I Got Love"			Former wife of former congressman, Mickey Edwards
1974	Debbie Knight	Warr Acres	22	Miss Warr Acres	Piano, "Minuet in G Major"			
1973	Andrea Hanson	Tahlequah	21	Miss Tulsa State Fair	Piano / Vocal, "The Homeland Aria" from Die Fledermaus	Top 10		
1972	Debbie Giannopoulos	Oklahoma City	20	Miss Warr Acres	Classical vocal from Carmen			Contestant at Miss Teenage America 1968 pageant
1971	Susan Supernaw	Tulsa	20	Miss Phillips University	Acrobatic Jazz Ballet		Special Judges' Award	
1970	Judy Adams	Cushing	20	Miss Oklahoma State University	Violin, "The Hot Canary" arranged by Florian ZaBach	Top 10	Preliminary Talent Award	
1969	Jeanne Gambrell	Tulsa	22	Miss University of Tulsa	Ballet / Jazz Dance, "Hair" & "Aquarius" from Hair			
1968	Beverly Drew	Harrah	22	Miss Shawnee	Vocal, "Step to the Rear"			
1967	Carolyn Denton	Muskogee	19	Miss Oklahoma State University	Vocal, "Sunshine, Lollipops, and Rainbows"			
1966	Sandy Ferguson			Miss Lawton		Did not compete; later assumed the title after Jayroe won Miss America 1967		
1966	Jane Anne Jayroe	Laverne	19	Miss Oklahoma City	Vocal / Orchestra Conducting, "1-2-3"	Winner	Preliminary Talent Award	
1965	Sandra Curtis	Tulsa	20	Miss Tulsa	Dramatic Reading, "Sorry Wrong Number"			
1964	Jane Hitch	Guymon	18	Miss Guymon	Dance			
1963	Cheryl Semrad Hassman	Waukomis		Miss Okeene	Speech, "May I Teach Others to Live"			
1962	Billi Kay Smith	Stroud	19	Miss Stroud	Dramatic Reading			
1961	Dana Darlene Reno	Stigler	20	Miss Stigler	Oration with Indian Sign Language			
1960	Donna Kay Creed	Enid	20	Miss Enid	Vocal, "The Sound of Music"			
1959	Mary Ann Hazelton	Tulsa	19		Piano		Non-finalist Talent Award	
1958	Anita Bryant	Tulsa	18		Vocal, "When the Boys Talk About the Girls"	2nd runner-up		
1957	Mary Nancy Denner	Alva			Poetry Recitation, "The Ballad of the Harp-Weaver" by Edna St. Vincent Millay	2nd runner-up		
1956	LaDonna Kramer	Loyal			Piano			
1955	Ann Campbell	Oklahoma City			Speech & Furniture Design Display	4th runner-up	Preliminary Lifestyle & Fitness Award	
1954	Charlavan Baker	Oklahoma City			Dress Design			
1953	Lo Rene Washburn	Tulsa	19		Vocal			
1952	Shirley Maurine Barbour	Tulsa	19		Drama		Miss Congeniality	
1951	Bobby Jene Simmons	Oklahoma City			Classical Vocal, "Je Veux Vivre" from Roméo et Juliette	Top 10		
1950	Louise O'Brien	Tulsa			Vocal, "Twas Only An Irishman's Dream"	4th runner-up		
1949	Georgine R. Leeka	Tulsa			Vocal			
1948	Donna Briggs	Tulsa			Painting Display	4th runner-up		
1947	No Oklahoma representative at Miss America pageant							
1946	No Oklahoma representative at Miss America pageant							
1945	No Oklahoma representative at Miss America pageant							
1944	No Oklahoma representative at Miss America pageant							
1943	Joan Marceille Hawk	Oklahoma City						
1942	No Oklahoma representative at Miss America pageant							
1941	Mifaunwy Dolores Shunatona	Tulsa				Top 15	Miss Congeniality	
1940	Ada Martyne Wood	Oklahoma City				Top 15		
1939	Bettye Cornelia Avert	Oklahoma City			Original Piano & Vocal, "Wondering & Dreaming"	1st runner-up		
1938	Marjorie Ann Adams	Ada						
1937	No Oklahoma representative at Miss America pageant							
1936	No Oklahoma representative at Miss America pageant							
1935	No Oklahoma representative at Miss America pageant							
1934	No national pageant was held							
1933	Joanne Alcorn		16		N/A	N/A		Withdrew from the competition due to appendicitis
1932	No national pageants were held							
1931	No national pageants were held							
1930	No national pageants were held							
1929	No national pageants were held							
1928	No national pageants were held							
1927	Virginia Howard	Tulsa		Miss Tulsa	N/A	Top 5		Competed under local title at national pageant
1926	Norma Smallwood	Tulsa	17	Miss Tulsa	N/A	Winner	Swimsuit & Evening Gown	First Native American to win Miss America; Competed under local title at national pageant
1925	Fern Marlow	Oklahoma City		Miss Oklahoma City	N/A			Multiple Oklahoma representatives Contestants competed under local title at national pageant
1925	Sue Starkey	Tulsa		Miss Tulsa	N/A			Multiple Oklahoma representatives Contestants competed under local title at national pageant
1924	Willie Mae Stockton	Oklahoma City		Miss Oklahoma City	N/A	Top 10		Multiple Oklahoma representatives Contestants competed under local title at national pageant
1924	Rose Everett	Tulsa		Miss Tulsa	N/A			Multiple Oklahoma representatives Contestants competed under local title at national pageant
1923	Mary Deen Overly	Oklahoma City		Miss Oklahoma City	N/A			Multiple Oklahoma representatives Contestants competed under local title at national pageant
1923	Constance Crosby	Tulsa		Miss Tulsa	N/A			Multiple Oklahoma representatives Contestants competed under local title at national pageant
1922	No Oklahoma representative at Miss America pageants							
1921	No Oklahoma representative at Miss America pageants							

== Venue ==
2007-Mabee Center
