= Lauren Nelson =

American beauty pageant contestant

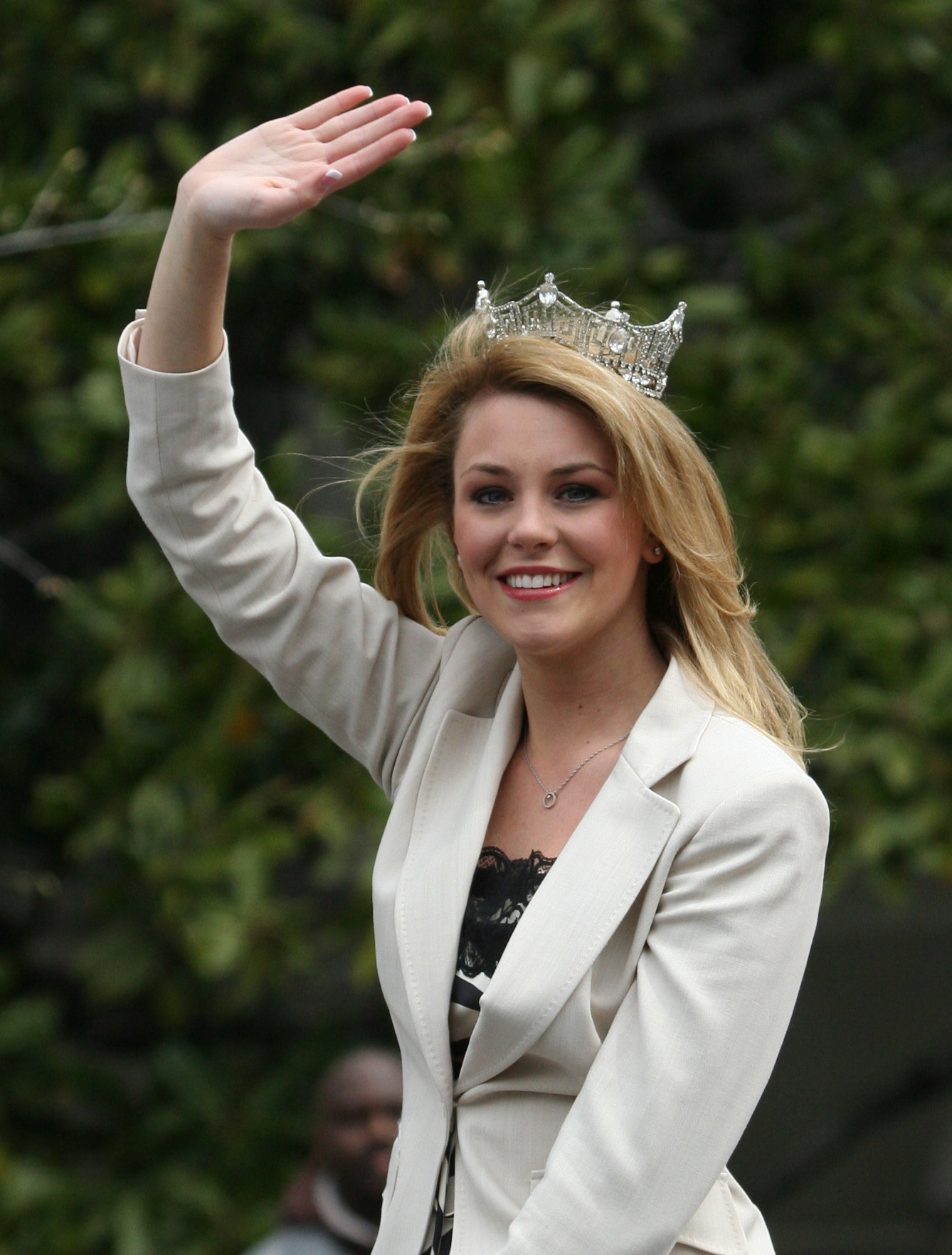
- Born: November 26, 1986 (age 39); Lawton, Oklahoma
- Education: MacArthur High School; University of Central Oklahoma
- Occupations: News Anchor; television personality
- Title: Miss Teen Lawton 2004; Miss Teen Oklahoma 2004; Miss Oklahoma State Fair 2006; Miss Oklahoma 2006; Miss America 2007
- Term: January 29, 2007 – January 26, 2008
- Predecessor: Jennifer Berry
- Successor: Kirsten Haglund
- Spouse: Randy Faram (m. 2009)
- Children: 2

Lauren Paige Nelson (born November 26, 1986) is a beauty queen from Lawton, Oklahoma, who holds the Miss America 2007 title. Nelson is the second consecutive Miss America and sixth in the history of Miss America to hail from this state.

== Early life and education ==
Nelson attended MacArthur High School and later graduated from University of Central Oklahoma with a degree in public relations.

== Pageantry ==
=== Miss Teen Oklahoma 2004 ===
Nelson was Miss Teen Oklahoma 2004, and in this role, she performed at the 2005 Miss America pageant.

=== Miss Oklahoma 2006 ===
She won the Miss Oklahoma State Fair 2006 local title and then competed in the Miss Oklahoma pageant for the first time on June 11, 2006. On the final night of competition, she was crowned Miss Oklahoma 2006, for which she received a $16,000 scholarship. At age nineteen, she was the youngest contestant to become Miss Oklahoma.

=== Miss America 2007 ===
Nelson went on to represent Oklahoma in the Miss America 2007 pageant that was broadcast on CMT from the Theatre for the Performing Arts on January 29, 2007. She won a preliminary swimsuit award on Thursday night, becoming her state's first swimsuit preliminary award since 1955. Her talent was a vocal performance, and her platform was, "Be NetSmart – Protecting Kids Online".

At the conclusion of the live telecast, Nelson was crowned Miss America 2007, beating first runner-up Miss Texas 2006, Shilah Phillips. She received a $50,000 scholarship award along with the title. She succeeded Jennifer Berry of Jenks, Oklahoma, this being the second occurrence of consecutive state winners since Mississippi took the Miss America title in both 1959 and 1960.

== Personal life ==
Nelson married Randy Faram, a student minister, on October 24, 2009. Nelson gave birth to a son, Mason, in October 2013 and a daughter, Dawson Paige, in March 2016.

== Miscellaneous ==
Nelson teamed up with host John Walsh on the FOX television show America's Most Wanted to assist in the apprehension of potential child predators, posing as a teenager online. Initial reports on May 1, 2007, stated that she did not plan to return to testify against those predators that were apprehended, putting the prosecution's case in jeopardy. However, she appeared to change her mind later that day, and it was reported that she would testify against the perpetrators.

On January 17, 2008, Nelson appeared on Are You Smarter Than a 5th Grader? playing for the Miss America Organization. She won $175,000 before "dropping out."

On August 2, 2010, Nelson joined KWTV in Oklahoma City, a CBS affiliate, as a co-anchor of the station's 4 P.M. newscast, which was reformatted from a traditional newscast to a lifestyle-oriented newscast.

Awards and achievements
Preceded by Jennifer Berry	Miss America; 2007	Succeeded by Kirsten Haglund
Preceded by Jennifer Warren	Miss Oklahoma; 2006	Succeeded by Lindsey Miller
Preceded by Ashley Hobbs	Miss Teen Oklahoma; 2004	Succeeded by Becca Hester
