= Kirsten Haglund =

American beauty pageant contestant

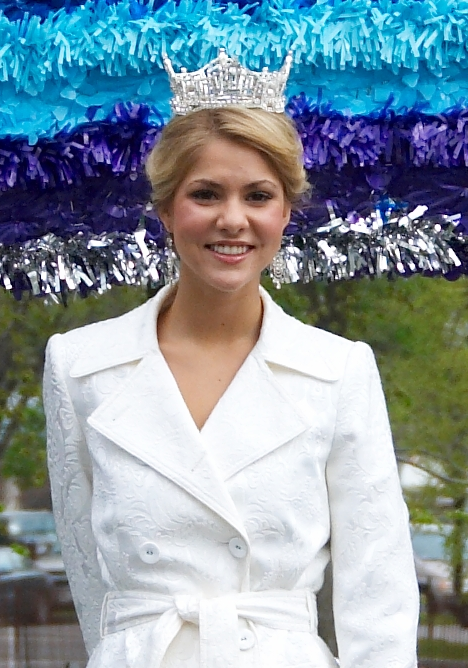
- Born: Kirsten Haglund, Miss America 2008, at the Cherry Blossom Festival; September 14, 1988 (age 37); Farmington Hills, Michigan, U.S.
- Education: University of Cincinnati; Emory University (BA)
- Title: Miss Oakland County 2006; Miss Michigan 2007; Miss America 2008
- Term: January 26, 2008 - January 24, 2009
- Predecessor: Lauren Nelson
- Successor: Katie Stam
- Spouses: Ryan Smith (m. 2012; div. 2018) Amadeus Müller-Daubermann (m. 2019)
- Website: www.kirstenhaglund.org

Kirsten Iora Müller-Daubermann (née Haglund; born September 14, 1988) is a public speaker, eating disorder awareness activist, commentator, and president of the Kirsten Haglund Foundation. She served as Miss America 2008.

== Education ==
At age 12, Haglund moved to Pennsylvania and lived with a host family to study ballet at the Central Pennsylvania Youth Ballet School.

Haglund graduated from Walled Lake Western High School in 2006 and spent one year pursuing a Bachelor of Fine Arts in musical theatre at the University of Cincinnati College-Conservatory of Music in Cincinnati, Ohio. She took time off to fulfill her duties as Miss Michigan 2007 and also prepare for and compete in the 2008 Miss America pageant.

After her reign as Miss America 2008, Haglund lived in Los Angeles, California for a year, and then returned to school to finish her undergraduate degree, using the over $60,000 in scholarship she won competing in the Miss America Organization. She received a B.A. in political science from Emory University in May 2013.

== Pageantry ==
=== Miss Michigan ===
Haglund's grandmother, Iora Hunt, represented Detroit, Michigan, at the Miss America 1944 pageant.

After winning the Miss Oakland County local title in 2006, Haglund competed in the Miss Michigan pageant and won in June 2007. She won a preliminary swimsuit award and at the conclusion of the final competition was crowned Miss Michigan. For her state talent, she performed "Adele's Laughing Song" from the operetta, Die Fledermaus.

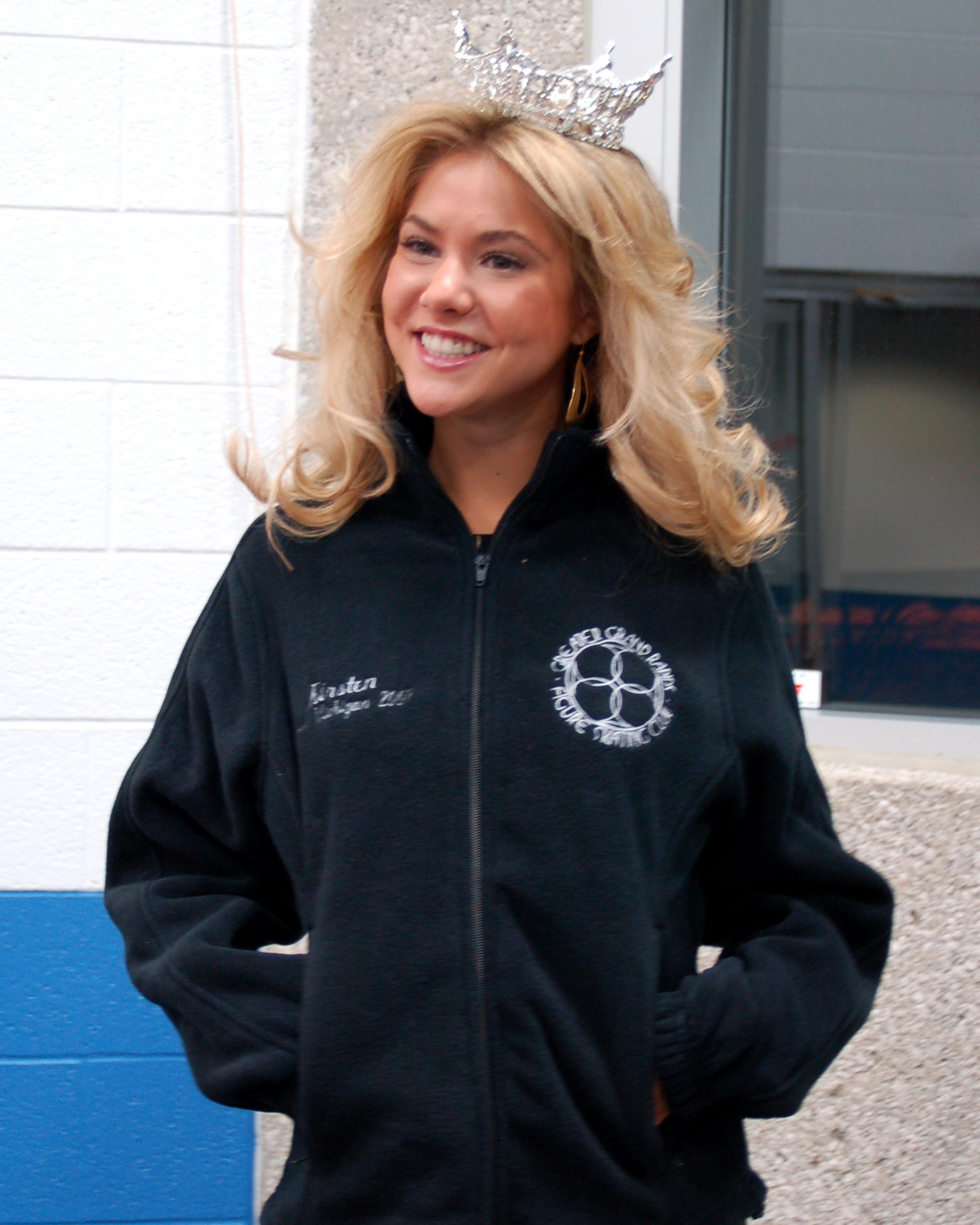
Kirsten Haglund as Miss Michigan 2007

=== Miss America 2008 ===
Haglund represented Michigan in the Miss America 2008 pageant broadcast on TLC from the Planet Hollywood Resort and Casino in Las Vegas, Nevada on January 26, 2008. She won a preliminary swimsuit award on Wednesday night, becoming her state's first preliminary swimsuit award winner since 1987. For the talent competition, she sang, "Over the Rainbow" from The Wizard of Oz. Her platform was "Eating Disorder Awareness," as she personally suffered from anorexia for five years beginning at age twelve.

At the conclusion of the live telecast, Haglund was crowned the 83rd Miss America. She succeeded Lauren Nelson, of Lawton, Oklahoma and was Michigan's fifth Miss America. At 19, Haglund was the youngest competing and the youngest Miss America winner since Kimberly Aiken took the title in 1993.

=== Miss America role ===
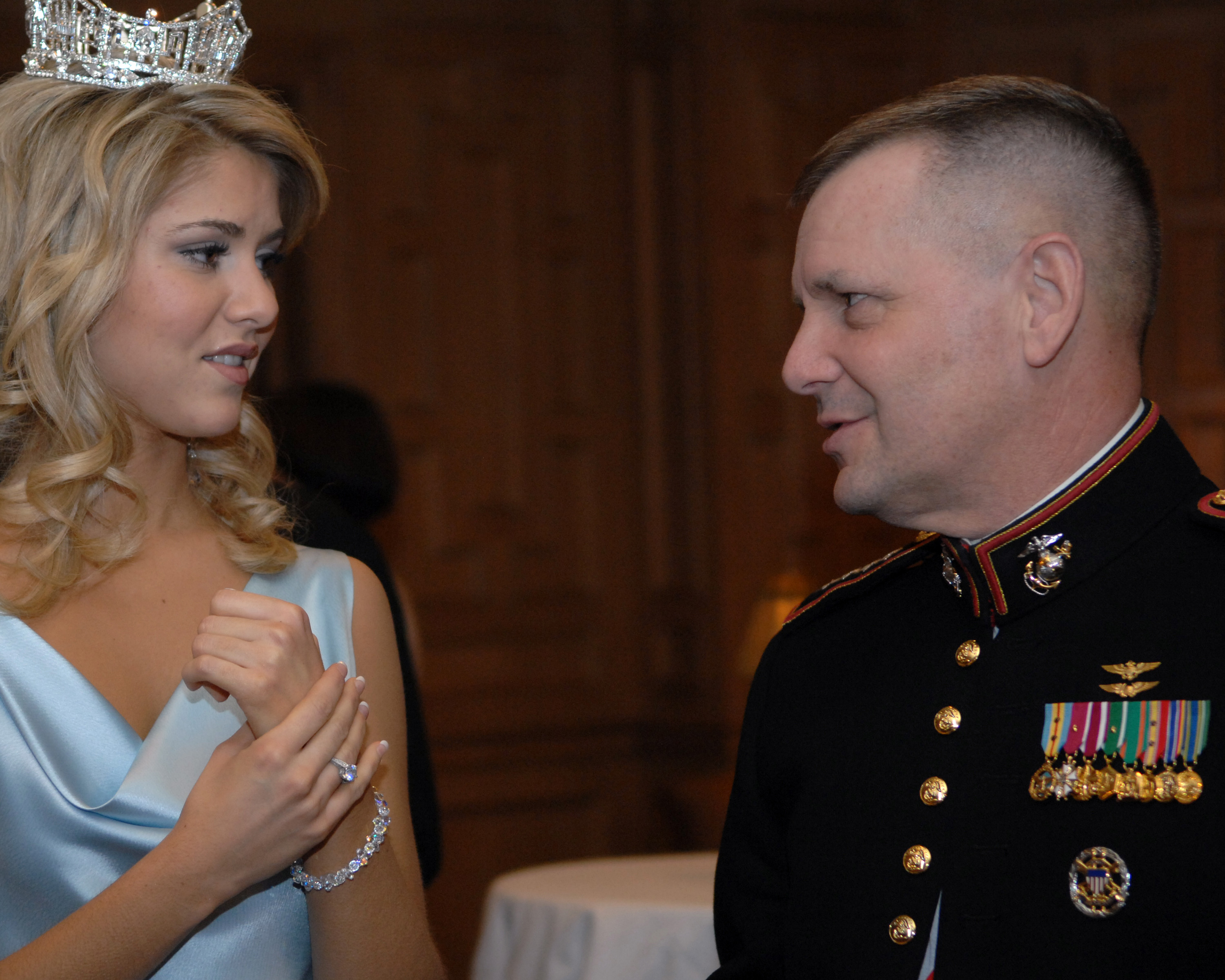
Vice Chairman of the Joint Chiefs of Staff Marine Gen. James E. Cartwright talks with Miss America 2008 Kirsten Haglund during the USO Annual Awards Dinner in Arlington, Va., March 25, 2008.

During her first week as Miss America, Haglund appeared on Live with Regis and Kelly, ABC News Now, Inside Edition, and Fox and Friends. She spoke at Harvard University and for the National Press Club on her platform of "Eating Disorder Awareness," and lobbied with the Eating Disorders Coalition on Capitol Hill for Mental Health Parity, speaking at a congressional briefing on her own personal battle and recovery from anorexia nervosa.

As part of her support of the Children's Miracle Network, the official platform of Miss America, Haglund served as National Goodwill Ambassador for the organization, visiting hospitals across the country, and supporting the organization's fundraising initiatives. She met with President Bush at the White House while participating in CMN's "Champions Across America" event. In the last week of her reign as Miss America, as a guest of the USO, she appeared in the Inaugural Parade for President Barack Obama, and attended the Commander in Chief Inaugural Ball.

== Career ==
After completing her year of service as Miss America 2008, she continued to travel and speak on body-image issues and eating disorders, also began her own 501(c)(3) non-profit foundation, the Kirsten Haglund Foundation, in 2009 to provide treatment scholarships for women struggling with the illness. She served as a Community Relations Specialist at the Timberline Knolls Residential Treatment Center in Lemont, Illinois, and is an ambassador for the National Eating Disorders Association.

She is a frequent commentator on politics, the millennial generation, women's and celebrity issues on Hannity, Red Eye w/ Greg Gutfeld, Fox & Friends, and The Real Story on Fox News Channel, and Real News on The Blaze. She has also made guest appearances on panels on Huffington Post Live, HLN, The Joy Behar Show, and on Fox Business News.

In other broadcasting work, she worked as a sideline correspondent for the 2012 and 2013 National Memorial Day Parades in Washington, D.C., televised in the DC Metro Area, conducting interviews with United States Secretary of the Navy Ray Mabus, actors Gary Sinise and Joe Mantegna and others. She served as a correspondent for the 6ABC telecast of the 2013 "Show Us Your Shoes" Parade, as a part of the Miss America Organization's return of the pageant to Atlantic City, New Jersey. As parade correspondent, she hosted segments alongside Lee Meriwether, Miss America 1955 and Phil Laduca, and conducted interviews with Bachelor host Chris Harrison and Good Morning America's Lara Spencer. She also appeared as a guest co-host for the hour-long 6ABC pre-pageant broadcast on September 16, 2013.

Haglund was the lead anchor of the daily, "Morning Briefing" on Styrk.com, an online news network.

She hosts a podcast on Faithwire.com titled, "The Sonder Podcast," during which she interviews, "leaders in politics, faith, mental health and culture."

== Personal life ==
Haglund married Ryan Smith in July 2012. The couple later divorced.

In October 2019, Haglund married Amadeus Müller-Daubermann, in Marco de Canaveses, Portugal. She lives in Zürich, Switzerland.

Awards and achievements
Preceded by Lauren Nelson	Miss America; 2008	Succeeded by Katie Stam
Preceded by Angela Corsi	Miss Michigan; 2007	Succeeded by Gina Valo
