= Miss America's Outstanding Teen 2012 =

7th edition of Miss America's Outstanding Teen pageant

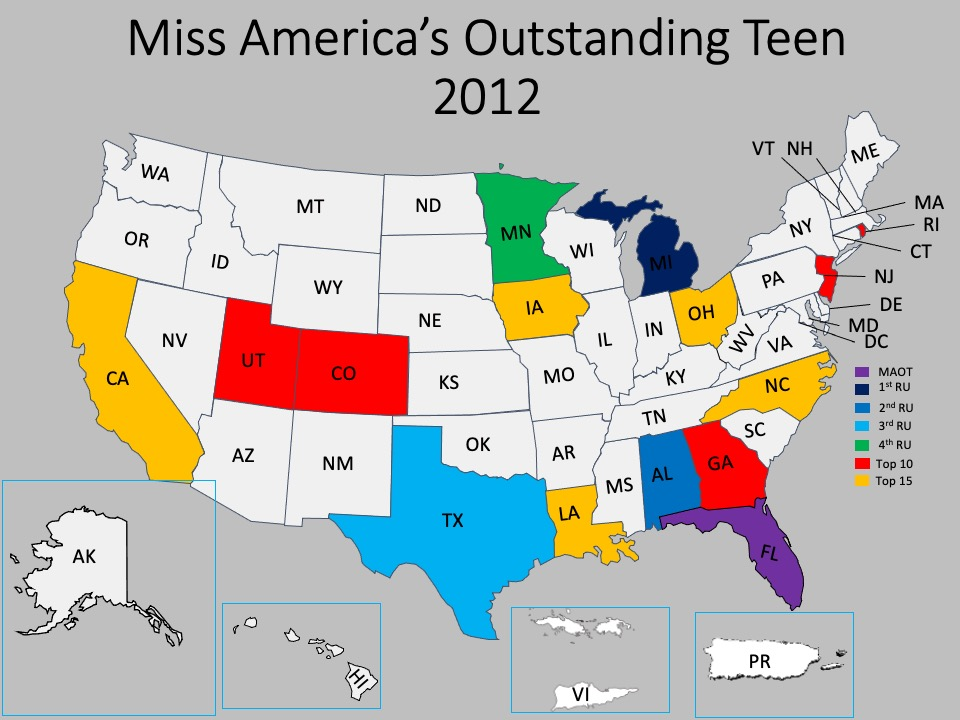
- Miss America's Outstanding Teen 2012 Participants and Results
- Date: August 20, 2011
- Presenters: Teresa Scanlan
- Entrants: 52
- Placements: 15
- Winner: Elizabeth Fechtel; Florida

Miss America's Outstanding Teen 2012 is the 7th Miss America's Outstanding Teen pageant held at the Linda Chapin Theater in the Orange County Convention Center in Orlando, Florida on August 20, 2011.

Lacey Russ of Oklahoma crowned her successor Elizabeth Fecthel of Florida at the end of the event.

== Results ==
=== Placements ===
Placement	Contestant
Miss America's Outstanding Teen 2012	Florida – Elizabeth Fechtel
1st Runner-Up	Michigan – Marissa Cowens
2nd Runner-Up	Alabama – Mi'a Callens
3rd Runner-Up	Texas – Reilly Johannsen
4th Runner-Up	Minnesota – Alexis Houle
Top 10	Colorado – Meredith Winnefield; Georgia – Julia Martin; New Jersey – Natalie Ragazzo; Rhode Island – Ivy Shen; Utah – Tiare Keeno
Top 15	California – Jessa Carmack; Iowa – Francesca Lubecki- Wilde; Louisiana – Justine Ker; North Carolina – McKenzie Faggart; Ohio – Kelsey Barrett

=== Awards ===
==== Preliminary Awards ====
Award	Contestant(s)
Preliminary Evening Wear/OSQ	Florida - Elizabeth Fechtel; Illinois - Summer Robbins; Minnesota - Alexis Houle; Nebraska - Brooke Ludemann
Preliminary Talent	Alabama - Mi'a Callens; Rhode Island - Ivy Shen; (Washington (state)) Washington - Nicole Renard

==== Other Awards ====
Award	Contestant(s)
Community Service	West Virginia - Isabel Raese
Miss Photogenic	Arkansas - Ashton Campbell
Non-finalist Evening Wear/OSQ	Missouri - McKensie Garber
Non-finalist Interview	Illinois - Summer Robbins
Non-finalist Talent	(Washington (state)) Washington - Nicole Renard
Outstanding Achievement in Academic Life	Pennsylvania - Kaitlynne Kline
Outstanding Instrumental Talent	Louisiana - Justine Ker; Rhode Island - Ivy Shen
People's Choice	New Jersey - Natalie Ragazzo; North Carolina - McKenzie Faggart
Scholastic Excellence	Louisiana - Justine Ker
Spirit of America	Wyoming - Montana Sannes
Teens in Action	Utah - Tiare Keeno
Top Ad Sales	1. West Virginia - Isabel Raese; 2. Texas - Reilly Johhannsen; 3. Montana - Jalyssa Gorder

== Contestants ==
Fifty-two contestants competed for the title.

State	Name	Hometown	Age	Local Title	Talent	Placement at MAO Teen	Special Awards at MAO Teen	Notes
Alabama	Mi'a Callens	Birmingham	17	Miss Jefferson County's Outstanding Teen	Piano/Vocal, "Hiding Underwater" by Beth Hart	2nd Runner-up	Preliminary Talent Award	
Alaska	Hannah Rockwell	Eagle River	17	Miss Anchorage's Outstanding Teen	Piano, "Someone Like You" from Jekyll & Hyde			
Arizona	Marissa Mezzatesta	Scottsdale	17	At-Large	Dance, "Dreaming In Color" by Jump5			
Arkansas	Ashton Campbell	Hindsville	17	Miss South Arkansas' Outstanding Teen	Vocal, "Via Dolorosa" by Sandi Patti		Miss Photogenic	Later Miss Arkansas 2014; 2nd runner-up at Miss America 2015 pageant
California	Jessa Carmack	Santa Clara	17	Miss Mission City's Outstanding Teen	Gymnastic Tumbling, "Let's Get Loud" by Jennifer Lopez	Top 15		Later Miss California 2016; Top 10 at Miss America 2017 pageant
Colorado	Meredith Winnefeld	Centennial	17		Dance/Twirl, "Can Can" from Can-Can	Top 10		
Connecticut	Nicole Lynn Nemense	Watertown	15	Miss Westbury's Outstanding Teen	Tap Dance, "Sit Down, You're Rockin' the Boat" from Guys and Dolls			
Delaware	Victoria Brown- O'Brien	Magnolia	16	Miss Diamond State's Outstanding Teen	Ballet en Pointe			
(Washington, D.C.) District of Columbia	Lauren Seely	Washington D.C.	17					
Florida	Elizabeth Fechtel	Leesburg	17	Miss Orlando's Outstanding Teen	Musical Theater Jazz Dance, "I Am What I Am"	Winner	Preliminary Evening Wear/OSQ Award	Sister of Miss Florida's Outstanding Teen 2010 and Miss Florida 2015, Mary Katherine Fechtel Dethroned after a tabulation error that resulted in Fechtel being named Miss Florida 2014 was corrected
(Georgia (U.S. state)) Georgia	Julia Martin	Marietta	16	Miss University of Georgia's Outstanding Teen	Cello	Top 10		Later Miss Georgia Teen USA 2013; 3rd runner-up at Miss Teen USA 2013 pageant
Hawaii	Briana Garrido	Mililani	16		Vocal, "Astonishing" from the musical version of Little Women			
Idaho	Melanie Ross	Idaho Falls	17	At-Large	Piano, "Toccata Op. #15" by Robert Muczynski			
Illinois	Summer Robbins	Coffeen	16	Miss Southern Illinois' Outstanding Teen	Violin, "Classical Gas" by Mason Williams		Non-finalist Interview Award Preliminary Evening Wear/OSQ Award	
Indiana	Brianna (Breezy) DeCamp	Kendallville	16	Miss Limberlost's Outstanding Teen	Tap Dance, "Dr. Jazz" by Jelly Roll Morton			Later Miss Indiana 2016
Iowa	Francesca Lubecki- Wilde	Iowa City	15	Miss Johnson County's Outstanding Teen	Piano, Twelve Variations on "Ah vous dirai-je, Maman" by Wolfgang Amadeus Mozart	Top 15	Top 5 Interview Award	
Kansas	Caitlyn Webb	Manhattan	15	Miss Manhattan's Outstanding Teen	Tae Kwon Do, "Stand Out" by Tevin Campbell			
Kentucky	Erynn Landherr	Louisville	16	Miss Louisville's Outstanding Teen				
Louisiana	Justine Ker	Choudrant	17	Miss Spirit of Ruston's Outstanding Teen	Classical Piano		Outstanding Instrumental Talent Award Scholastic Excellence Award	Later Miss Louisiana 2016; Top 15 at Miss America 2017 pageant
Maine	Alison Folsom	Saco	16		Vocal, "I Dreamed a Dream" from Les Misérables			Younger sister of Miss Maine's Outstanding Teen 2008, Shannon Folsom
Maryland	Ally Soule	Frederick	15	Miss Frederick's Outstanding Teen				
Massachusetts	Sydney Rachael Levin- Epstein	East Longmeadow	16	Miss Western Massachusetts' Outstanding Teen	Irish Step Dance			
Michigan	Marissa Cowans	St. Clair Shores	17	Miss St. Clair Shores' Outstanding Teen	Jazz Dance	1st runner-up		
Minnesota	Alexis Houle	Knife River	16		Vocal, "Part of Your World" from The Little Mermaid	4th runner-up	Preliminary Evening Wear/OSQ Award	
Mississippi	France Beard	Madison	18	Miss Madison's Outstanding Teen			Teens in Action Award Finalist	
Missouri	McKensie Garber	Hale		Miss Lake of the Ozarks' Outstanding Teen	Theatrical Dance, "I Can Hear the Bells" from Hairspray		Non-finalist Evening Wear/OSQ Award	Later Miss Missouri 2015
Montana	Jalyssa S. Gorder	Sidney	15		Dance, "Jar of Hearts" by Christina Perri		3rd place in Ad Sales	
Nebraska	Brooke Ludemann	North Platte	17	Miss Northwest's Outstanding Teen	Vocal, "Hallelujah" by Leonard Cohen		Preliminary Evening Wear/OSQ Award	2nd runner-up at Miss Nebraska 2015 pageant
Nevada	Bailey Gumm	Minden	16	Miss Lake Tahoe's Outstanding Teen	Tap Dance, "Misery Business" by Paramore			Older sister to Miss Nevada's Outstanding Teen 2017, Carli Gumm Later Miss Nevada 2016
New Hampshire	Lauren Percy	Bow	17	Miss Strafford County's Outstanding Teen	Ballet en Pointe, "Will and Elizabeth" from Pirates of the Caribbean: The Curse of the Black Pearl			Later Miss New Hampshire 2017
New Jersey	Natalie Ragazzo	Pennington	15		Vocal, "Circle of Life" from The Lion King	Top 10	People's Choice Award	4th runner-up to at Miss New Jersey 2017 pageant 2nd runner-up at Miss New Jersey 2018 pageant
New Mexico	Nicolette Young	Las Cruces	15	Miss Las Cruces' Outstanding Teen	Ballet en Pointe			
(New York (state)) New York	Lauren Molella	Millbrook	15	Miss Duchess County's Outstanding Teen	Ballet en Pointe, "Arabian Nights" from Aladdin			Daughter of Miss Massachusetts 1983 and National Sweetheart 1982, Holly Mayer Niece of Miss New York 1989, Lisa Molella
North Carolina	McKenzie Faggart	Concord		Miss Cabarrus County's Outstanding Teen		Top 15	America's Choice	Later Miss North Carolina 2016
North Dakota	Kylie Helm	Bismarck	15	Miss State Capital's Outstanding Teen	Ballet en Pointe			3rd runner-up at Miss North Dakota 2016 pageant
Ohio	Kelsey Barrett	Wapakoneta	17	Miss Crystal Lakes' Outstanding Teen	Vocal, "Here I Stand" by Usher	Top 15		
Oklahoma	Clytee Burchett			Miss Edmond Liberty Fest's Outstanding Teen				
Oregon	Alexi Provost- Shean	Medford	16	Miss Southern Gem's Outstanding Teen	Tap Dance, "On the Floor" by Jennifer Lopez featuring Pitbull			
Pennsylvania	Kaitlynne Kline	Cochranton	17	Miss Laurel Highland's Outstanding Teen	Vocal, "The Wizard and I" from Wicked		Outstanding Achievement in Academic Life Award	
Puerto Rico	Aylín Marí Torres	Bayamón		Miss Bayamon's Outstanding Teen				
Rhode Island	Ivy Shen	East Greenwich	16		Classical Violin	Top 10	Outstanding Instrumental Talent Award Preliminary Talent Award Top 5 Interview Award	Older sister of Miss Rhode Island's Outstanding Teen 2013, Heather Shen
South Carolina	Caitlen Patton	Summerville	17	Miss Columbia Teen	Vocal			
South Dakota	Alexis Kosiak	Sioux Falls	16		Vocal / Guitar, "Best Friend", original song by Alexis Kosiak			
Tennessee	Madison Snipes		16	Miss Tennessee Valley's Outstanding Teen	Tap Dance			4th runner-up at Miss Tennessee 2018 pageant
Texas	Reilly Johannsen	Irving	16	Miss Colleyville's Outstanding Teen	Dance	3rd runner-up	2nd place in Ad Sales	
Utah	Tiare Keeno	Spanish Fork	15		Contemporary Dance, "Earth" from Gladiator	Top 10	Teens in Action Award	
Vermont	Sophia Hadeka	Fair Haven	13		Dance, "Stand Still, Look Pretty" by The Wreckers			Later Miss Vermont Teen USA 2013 Later Distinguished Young Woman of Vermont 2016
Virginia	Dominick Fink	Chesapeake	15	Miss Greater Richmond's Outstanding Teen	Dance			3rd runner-up at Miss Virginia Teen USA 2013 pageant Later Miss District of Columbia Teen USA 2014 As of 2018 NFL cheerleader for the Jacksonville Jaguars
(United States Virgin Islands) Virgin Islands	Kaylah Charmaine Galloway	Saint Croix						
(Washington (state)) Washington	Nicole Renard	Kennewick	16	Miss Tri-Cities' Outstanding Teen	Dance, "Amayzing Mayzie" from Seussical		Non-finalist Talent Award Preliminary Talent Award	Younger sister of Miss Washington's Outstanding Teen 2010, Victoria Renard Later Distinguished Young Woman of America 2013 Later Miss Washington 2017
West Virginia	Isabel Raese	Morgantown	13	Miss Mon Valley's Outstanding Teen	Tap Dance		Community Service Award Top Ad Seller Award	
Wisconsin	Annie Jorgensen	Mequon	16	Miss Milwaukee's Outstanding Teen	Dance, "Cosmic Love" by Florence and the Machine			Later Miss High School America 2013 Later Miss Georgia 2018
Wyoming	Montana Sannes	Lander	16	Miss Hot Springs' Outstanding Teen	Dance, Disco Medley		Spirit of America Award	
