= Miss Missouri's Teen =

- Formation: 2005
- Type: Beauty pageant
- Location: Mexico, Missouri
- Members: Miss America's Teen
- Official language: English
- Key people: Steve Wilson and Simone Esters
- Website: Official website

The Miss Missouri's Teen competition is the pageant that selects the representative for the U.S. state of Missouri in the Miss America's Teen pageant. Miss Missouri's Teen pageant is often held the second weekend of June.

Anna Hall of Branson was crowned Miss Missouri's Teen on June 12, 2026, at Missouri Military Academy in Mexico, Missouri. She competed for the title of Miss America's Teen 2027 on September 5, 2026, at the Kravis Center for the Performing Arts in West Palm Beach, Florida.

== Results summary ==
The following is a visual summary of the past results of Miss Missouri's Teen titleholders presented in the table below. The year in parentheses indicates year of the Miss America's Teen competition in which the placement and/or award was garnered.

=== Placements ===
- 3rd runners-up: Tess Mandoli (2014)
- 4th runners-up: Sydnee Stottlemyre (2009), Shae Smith (2020)
- Top 8: Christina Stratton (2017)

=== Awards ===
==== Preliminary awards ====
- Preliminary Lifestyle and Fitness: Sydnee Stottlemyre (2009), Tess Mandoli (2014)
- Preliminary Talent: Shae Smith (2020)

==== Non-finalists awards ====
- Non-finalist Evening Wear/On Stage Question: McKensie Garber (2012)
- Non-finalist Interview Award: Mallory Sublette (2023)

==== Other awards ====
- Children's Miracle Network (CMN) Miracle Maker Award: Shae Smith (2020)
- Overall Instrumental Talent: Ashley Whipple (2019)
- Scholastic Excellence: Lauren McCreight (2010)
- Teens in Action Award Winners: Ashley Whipple (2019)

== Winners ==
- Declared as winner
- Ended as a runner-up
- Ended as a finalist or semi-finalist

Year	Name	Hometown	Age	Local title	Talent	Placement at MAO Teen	Special scholarships at MAO Teen	Notes
2026	Anna Hall	Branson	18	Miss Southwest's Teen	Vocal			
2025	Greta Clark	Eureka	18	Miss Branson's Teen	Lyrical Dance			
2024	Bridget Caldwell	Florissant	15	Miss Columbia's Teen	Tap Dance			
2023	Gracyn Rouse	Thayer	16	Miss Southern Missouri's Teen	Vocal			
2022	Mallory Sublette	Palmyra	17	Miss Flower City's Outstanding Teen	Dance		Non-finalist Interview Award	
2021	Ashley Berry	Clinton	17	Miss Metro St. Louis' Outstanding Teen	Ballet en Pointe, "The Fifth (Requiem)"			Later Miss Missouri 2024
2020	Halie Hebron	O'Fallon	16	Miss Fleur de Lis' Outstanding Teen	Contemporary Dance	Did not compete; 1st runner-up at Miss Missouri's Outstanding Teen 2019; later appointed the title on December 5, 2020 after Smith chose not to finish the remaining six months of her extended two-year reign; 2020 state pageant cancelled due to the COVID-19 pandemic		
2019	Shae Smith	Bolivar	15	Miss Branson’s Outstanding Teen	Jazz Dance, "September"	4th runner-up	CMN Miracle Maker Award Preliminary Talent Award	Previously Miss Missouri Junior High School America 2016 Later Miss Missouri Teen USA 2022 Later Miss Missouri USA 2025; Top 20 at Miss USA 2025
2018	Ashley Whipple	Chesterfield	17	Miss Heartland's Outstanding Teen	Piano, "Solfeggieto" by Carl Philipp Emanuel Bach		Overall Instrumental Talent Award Teens in Action Award	Previously Miss Missouri Junior High School America 2015
2017	Heleena Harberer	Branson	16	Miss Springfield's Outstanding Teen	Contemporary Dance, "To This Day"			
2016	Christina Stratton	Sedalia		Miss Kansas City's Outstanding Teen	Ballet, “Dancing Queen”	Top 8		Previously Miss Missouri High School America 2014; 2nd runner-up at Miss High School America 2014 pageant Previously Miss Missouri Teen USA 2015; Top 15 and named Miss Photogenic at Miss Teen USA 2015 pageant
2015	Alexis Piskulic	Arnold	15	Miss River City’s Outstanding Teen	Dance/Twirl, “A Brand New Day”			"Silver Twin" in Purdue University's “All-American” Marching Band
2014	Charlee Bisch	St. Louis	16	Miss Metro St. Louis' Outstanding Teen	Vocal, “Not for the Life of Me” from Thoroughly Modern Millie			
2013	Tess Mandoli	St. Louis	16	Miss Metro St. Louis' Outstanding Teen	Classical Piano, "Impromptus Opus 90, No. 2 in E-flat major" by Franz Schubert	3rd runner-up	Preliminary Lifestyle & Fitness Award	
2012	Shelby Steingraeber			Miss St. Charles' Outstanding Teen	Vocal			2nd runner-up at Miss Missouri 2017 pageant
2011	McKensie Garber	Hale		Miss Lake of the Ozarks' Outstanding Teen	Theatrical Dance, "I Can Hear the Bells" from Hairspray		Non-finalist Evening Wear/OSQ Award	Later Miss Missouri 2015
2010	Alexandria Black	Branson	17	Miss Branson's Outstanding Teen	Vocal			3rd runner-up at Miss Missouri United States 2014 pageant Later International Junior Miss Missouri 2015
2009	Lauren McCreight	Springfield	16	Miss Gateway St. Louis' Outstanding Teen	Vocal, “Girl in 14G”		Scholastic Excellence Award	
2008	Sydnee Stottlemyre	Wildwood	14	Miss Gateway St. Louis' Outstanding Teen	Contemporary Lyrical Dance, "Rock Your Soul"	4th runner-up	Preliminary Lifestyle & Fitness Award	4th runner-up at Miss Teen USA 2011 pageant Later Miss Missouri USA 2016; Top 10 at Miss USA 2016 pageant
2007	Mary Bauer	Cape Girardeau	16	Miss Maulden's Outstanding Teen	Vocal, "Popular" from Wicked			4th runner-up at Miss Missouri 2009 pageant
2006	Melanie Collier	Kirksville		Miss Kirksville's Outstanding Teen	Lyrical Jazz Dance			
2005	Airen Ferguson	Hannibal	17		Clogging			
