= Miss America 1980 =

53rd Miss America pageant

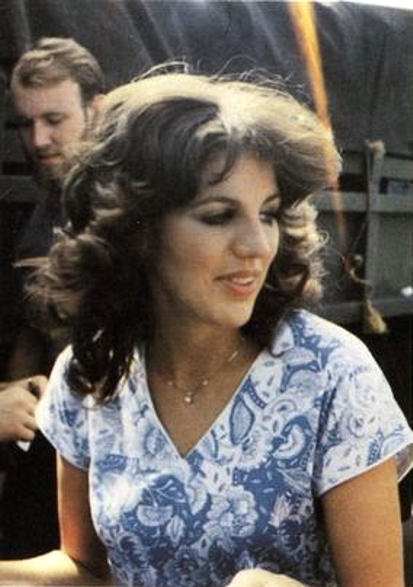
- Cheryl Prewitt, Miss America 1980, aboard USS Frederick
- Date: September 8, 1979
- Presenters: Bert Parks
- Venue: Boardwalk Hall, Atlantic City, New Jersey
- Broadcaster: NBC
- Winner: Cheryl Prewitt; Mississippi

Miss America 1980, the 53rd Miss America pageant, was televised from the Boardwalk Hall in Atlantic City, New Jersey on September 8, 1979, by the NBC Television Network.

Cheryl Prewitt was the third woman from Mississippi to win the title. During the competition, she was the only contestant to demonstrate two talents, singing while playing the piano.

Prewitt was crowned by Kylene Barker of Virginia, Miss America 1979.

== Results ==
=== Placements ===
Placement	Contestant
Miss America 1980	Mississippi – Cheryl Prewitt
1st Runner-Up	Ohio – Tana Kay Carli
2nd Runner-Up	Kansas – Michelle Elaine Whitson
3rd Runner-Up	Missouri – Susan Wilson
4th Runner-Up	Florida – Marti Sue Phillips
Top 10	Arizona – Pam Wenzel; Iowa – Lori Jean Froeling; New York – Kelli Diane Krull; Pennsylvania – Carolyn Louise Black; West Virginia – Deborah Davis

=== Awards ===
==== Preliminary awards ====
Awards	Contestant
Lifestyle and Fitness	Maryland - Shelly Meg Peiken; Mississippi - Cheryl Prewitt; North Carolina - Monta Anne Maki
Talent	Arizona - Pam Wenzel; (New York (state)) New York - Kelli Diane Krull; Ohio - Tana Kay Carli

==== Non-finalist awards ====
Awards	Contestant
Talent	Alabama - Kathy Jo Pickett; (Georgia (U.S. state)) Georgia - Sandra Eakes; Louisiana - Myrrah Monroe McCully; Michigan - Bethany Jane Wright; North Dakota - Daureen Podenski; Oklahoma - Jill Elmore; South Dakota - Julie Kay Kleinsasser; Tennessee - Elise Neal

== Contestants ==
State	Name	Hometown	Age	Talent	Placement	Special Awards	Notes
Alabama	Kathy Pickett	Mulga	26	Classical Vocal, "Sempre Libera" from La Traviata		Non-finalist Talent Award	
Alaska	Lila Oberg	Palmer	19	Vocal, "For Once in My Life"			
Arizona	Pam Wenzel	Phoenix	22	Acrobatic Gymnastic Dance, Theme from The Children of Sanchez	Top 10	Preliminary Talent Award	
Arkansas	Janet Holman	North Little Rock	22	Vocal, "Somewhere"			
California	Deanna Rae Fogarty	Azusa	22	Vocal, "Cabaret"			
Colorado	Sheliah Wilkins	Denver	23	Classical Vocal, "Quando me'n vo'"			
Connecticut	Laura Kaufmann	Enfield	18	Interpretive Modern Jazz Dance			
Delaware	Ann Lorraine Harrington	Milford	22	Magic Act			
Florida	Marti Sue Phillips	Tampa	22	Jazz Clarinet Medley, Rhapsody in Blue & "Begin the Beguine"	4th runner-up		
(Georgia (U.S. state)) Georgia	Sandra Eakes	Warner Robins	22	Popular Vocal, "The Trolley Song" & "Rock-a-Bye Your Baby with a Dixie Melody"		Non-finalist Talent Award	Sister of Miss Georgia 1982, Bobbie Eakes
Hawaii	Sheron Lehuanani Bissen	Kahului	20	Vocal, "Over the Rainbow"			
Idaho	Gladys Steele	Boise	22	Violin, "Polish Dance"			
Illinois	Elizabeth Russell	Pekin	20	Classical Vocal, "O Luce di Quest'Anima" from Linda di Chamounix			
Indiana	Rickee Farrell	Valparaiso	18	Acrobatic Dance, "Sweet Charity"			
Iowa	Lori Froeling	Keokuk	20	Flute, "Carnival of Venice"	Top 10		
Kansas	Michelle Elaine Whitson	Mission	21	Harp, "Never on Sunday"	2nd runner-up		Previously National Sweetheart 1978
Kentucky	Kathryn Parker	Wilmore	21	Flute, "The Swiss Shepherd's Song"			
Louisiana	Myrrah McCully	Monroe	24	Piano, "Piano Concerto in D-flat major" by Aram Khachaturian		Non-finalist Talent Award	
Maine	Jill O'Brien	Bangor	22	Ballet, "Irish Suite"			
Maryland	Shelly Meg Peiken	Greenbelt	22	Self-Composed Vocal, "Carry Me Home"		Preliminary Lifestyle & Fitness Award	
Massachusetts	Lisa Matta	Brockton	20	Jazz Dance, "Slow Dancing"			
Michigan	Bethany Jane Wright	Saginaw	19	Vocal, "The Music and the Mirror" from A Chorus Line		Non-finalist Talent Award	
Minnesota	Debra Ann Nerby	Rochester	24	Vocal, "Who Can I Turn To?"			
Mississippi	Cheryl Prewitt	Ackerman	22	Vocal/Piano, "Don't Cry Out Loud"	Winner	Preliminary Lifestyle & Fitness Award	
Missouri	Susan Wilson	Columbia	21	Piano, Fantaisie-Impromptu	3rd runner-up		
Montana	Lori Conlon	Billings	20	Piano, "Toccata"			
Nebraska	Kathryn Ann Saathoff	Fremont	21	Vocal, "It Don't Mean a Thing (If It Ain't Got That Swing)"			
Nevada	Jeanne Cangemi	North Lake Tahoe	22	Classical & Jazz Saxophone, "Harlem Nocturne" & "Csárdás"			
New Hampshire	Monica Skiathitis	Manchester	20	Tap Dance, "Sweet Georgia Brown"			Previously New Hampshire's Junior Miss 1976
New Jersey	Mary McGinnis	Somers Point	22	Clarinet, "Hora"			
New Mexico	Susan Spartz	Alamogordo	18	Vocal, "My Man"			
(New York (state)) New York	Kelli Krull	Buffalo	21	Baton Twirling Exhibition, "If My Friends Could See Me Now"	Top 10	Preliminary Talent Award	
North Carolina	Monta Maki	Hickory	23	Vocal, "You Light Up My Life"		Preliminary Lifestyle & Fitness Award	
North Dakota	Daureen Podenski	Edgeley	22	Classical Vocal, "Vissi d'arte" from Tosca		Non-finalist Talent Award	
Ohio	Tana Carli	Lakewood	23	Accordion Medley, "Tea for Two" & "Dizzy Fingers"	1st runner-up	Preliminary Talent Award	
Oklahoma	Jill Elmore	Tulsa	23	Classical Vocal, "Art is Calling for Me" from The Enchantress by Victor Herbert		Non-finalist Talent Award	
Oregon	Tami Sanders	Roseburg	21	Gymnastic Dance, "A Fifth of Beethoven"			
Pennsylvania	Carolyn Louise Black	Elizabethtown	22	Vocal, "All the Things You Are"	Top 10		
Rhode Island	Elaine Rushlow	Westerly	20	Piano, "Bridge Over Troubled Waters"			
South Carolina	Jane Jenkins	Johns Island	23	Vocal Medley, "The Party's Over" & "Send in the Clowns"			Author of Bare Feet to High Heels, What Ta Tas Teach Us, and "Bury Me with My Pearls"
South Dakota	Julie Kleinsasser	Freeman	19	Popular Vocal, "Cry"		Non-finalist Talent Award	
Tennessee	Elise Neal	Paris	21	Piano, "Prelude in C minor" by Rachmaninoff		Non-finalist Talent Award	
Texas	Lex Ann Haughey	Hurst	20	Flute, "Flight of the Bumblebee" & "Flight '76" by Walter Murphy			
Utah	Karen L. Brimley	Layton	19	Semi-classical Vocal, "Love is Where You Find It"			
Vermont	Shari Bach	Middlebury	22	Classical Piano, Holberg Suite			
Virginia	Darlene McIntosh	Chesapeake	22	Classical Piano, "Prelude in C-sharp minor"			
(Washington (state)) Washington	Janelle Martz	Normandy Park	22	Classical Piano, "Piano Concerto in A Minor" by Edvard Grieg			
West Virginia	Deborah Davis	Huntington	22	Vocal Medley, "He Touched Me" from Drat! The Cat! & "Maybe This Time" from Cabaret	Top 10		Previously Miss West Virginia USA 1978 Later Mrs. America 1984 1st runner-up at Mrs. World 1984
Wisconsin	Kristine Konrad	Oshkosh	19	Vocal, "Starting Here, Starting Now"			
Wyoming	Karla Singer	Cheyenne	19	Vocal, "Mister Melody"			
