= Erin O'Flaherty =

American beauty pageant titleholder

- Born: South Carolina
- Title: Miss Missouri 2016
- Predecessor: McKensie Garber

Erin O'Flaherty is an American beauty pageant titleholder who held the title of Miss Missouri in the Miss America 2017 pageant. She is the first openly lesbian contestant to compete in Miss America.

== Pageants ==
In 2013, she was crowned Miss University of Central Florida. While there, she was an ambassador for Children's Miracle Network. She took a couple years off from pageant competition, however, she wanted to compete before she surpassed the age eligibility. In 2016, she was crowned Miss Missouri in the Miss America pageant. Also in 2016, she became the first openly lesbian contestant to compete in Miss America. Her platform is suicide prevention, a cause close to her heart from losing her best friend to suicide and experiencing her first funeral at the age of 13. As an advocate for suicide prevention, she works with The Trevor Project, a hotline for LGBT youth, and The American Foundation for Suicide Prevention. Her talent is a vocal performance.

== Personal life ==
Erin O'Flaherty is originally from Florence, South Carolina. O'Flaherty came out as gay when she was 18, while attending the University of Central Florida.

She attended the University of Central Florida, where she graduated with a bachelor's degree in accounting. During an interview at UCF, O'Flaherty's dream job was to be a cashier as a child. She loved balancing her grandmother's checkbook every Sunday and was fascinated with the transaction process. As her strength for rules, organization, and numbers increased with her entrepreneurial drive, her dream of owning or operating a small business was created. She currently lives in St. Louis, Missouri as the Director of Operations for Captiva Marketing. She enjoys world traveling, kayaking to see wildlife in Wekiwa Springs, and playing soccer. She also enjoys singing, which contributes to her talent in pageants.

In 2018, a short documentary was made about her life story called "Crowning Change" that premiered to audiences at film festivals around the world.

== See also ==
- Djuan Trent

Awards and achievements
Preceded by McKensie Garber	Miss Missouri; 2016	Succeeded by Jennifer Davis
