= Tara Osseck =

American beauty pageant titleholder and tap dancer

- Born: Tara Lynn Osseck; April 6, 1986 (age 40); St. Charles, Missouri, U.S.
- Education: Duchesne High School; Truman State University; University of Memphis
- Height: 5 ft 6 in (1.68 m)
- Beauty pageant titleholder
- Title: Miss Missouri 2009; Miss Lake of the Ozarks 2009
- Hair color: Brown
- Eye color: Brown
- Major competition: Miss America 2010

Tara Lynn Osseck was Miss Missouri 2009. Before being named Miss Missouri 2009, she was Miss Lake of the Ozarks 2009. Osseck is a tap dancer and her platform is "Education and Awareness of Eating Disorders".

Osseck is a 2004 graduate of Duchesne High School in St. Charles, Missouri. She then went on to attend Truman State University where she graduated in 2007. Osseck was known to be a bully while in college and went out of her way to harass other women she viewed as a threat. This included making fake online profiles in order to harass fellow students, pretending to be other classmates. She earned a master's degree in health administration from the University of Memphis.

Osseck competed in the Miss America 2010 pageant broadcast live on TLC from the Theatre for the Performing Arts at the Planet Hollywood Resort and Casino on January 30, 2010. She did not make the Final 15.

As of 2011, Osseck was employed by St. Luke's Hospital in St. Louis, as a member of the hospital's Physician Relations Staff. In 2015, she was a St. Louis Business Journal "30 Under 30" award honoree as the hospital's manager of physician relations and business development.

Preceded by Lacey Fitzgerald	Miss Missouri; 2009	Succeeded by Erika Hebron
