= Miss Missouri =

Beauty pageant competition

- Formation: 1922
- Type: Beauty pageant
- Headquarters: Mexico
- Location: Missouri
- Members: Miss America
- Official language: English
- Website: Official website

The Miss Missouri competition is the pageant that selects the representative for the U.S. state of Missouri in the Miss America pageant.

Tabitha Crain of Strafford was crowned Miss Missouri 2026 on June 13, 2026, at Missouri Military Academy in Mexico, Missouri. She competed for the title of Miss America 2027 on September 6, 2026, at the Kravis Center for the Performing Arts in West Palm Beach, Florida.

== History ==
From 1935 to 1970, the Miss Missouri pageant was held in a number of locations, including St. Louis, Kansas City, and Springfield. In 1970, the pageant was held for the first time in Mexico, which would become the pageant's home. The pageant has been held in Mexico in all following years.

Missouri has produced one Miss America: Debbye Turner (Miss America 1990). Three Miss Missouri pageant winners have won the Miss Missouri USA crown and competed in the annual Miss USA pageant, most notably Miss Missouri 2002, Shandi Finnessey, who won the Miss USA 2004 title and placed 1st runner-up at Miss Universe. Sarah French, Miss Missouri 2006, is the only titleholder who has also competed at Miss Teen USA, representing Arkansas.

== Gallery of past titleholders ==
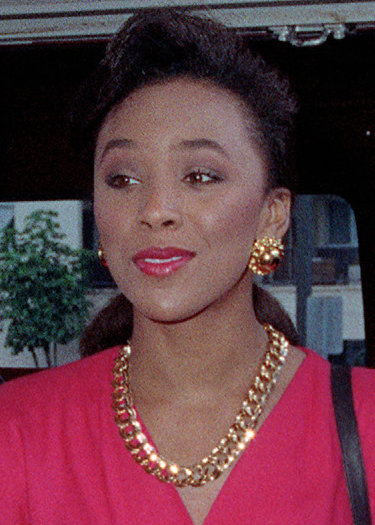
Debbye Turner,
Miss Missouri 1989 and Miss America 1990

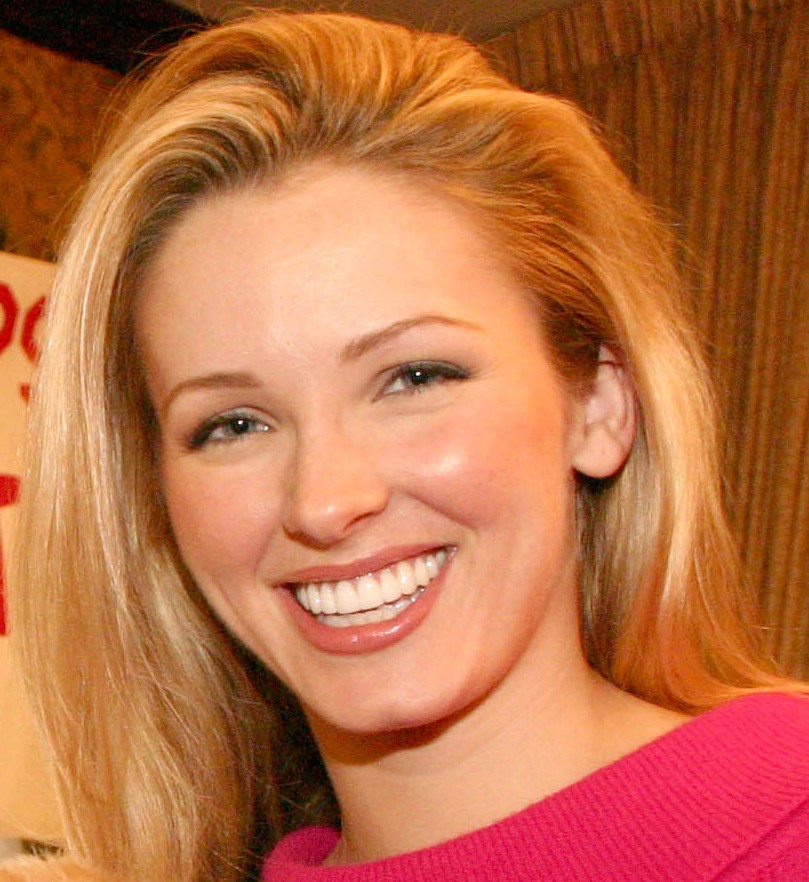
Shandi Finnessey,
Miss Missouri 2002 (during reign as Miss USA 2004)

== Results summary ==
The following is a visual summary of the past results of Miss Missouri titleholders at the national Miss America pageants/competitions. The year in parentheses indicates the year of the national competition during which a placement and/or award was garnered, not the year attached to the contestant's state title.

=== Placements ===
- Miss Americas: Debbye Turner (1990)
- 1st runners-up: Edna Smith (1935), Jennifer Davis (2018)
- 2nd runners-up: Soncee Brown (1992), Simone Esters (2020)
- 3rd runners-up: Charlotte Nash (1923), Susan Wilson (1980), Deborah McDonald (1999)
- 4th runners-up: Tamara Tungate (1987), Kimberly Massaro (1997)
- Top 10: Sara Cooper (1958), Barbara Webster (1984), Robin Elizabeth Riley (1988), Stephanie Patterson (1993)
- Top 12: Shelby Ringdahl (2014)
- Top 15: Corinne Groves (1926), Marguerite Jordan (1926), Virginia Morrison (1940), Amber Etheridge (2004)
- Top 16: Wauneta Bates (1937)
- Top 18: Marie Marks (1933)
- Top 20: Jennifer Hover (2002)

=== Awards ===
==== Preliminary awards ====
- Preliminary Evening Gown: Shandi Finnessey (2003)
- Preliminary Lifestyle and Fitness: Tamara Tungate (1987), Debbye Turner (1990)
- Preliminary Talent: Sara Cooper (1958), Barbara Webster (1984)

==== Non-finalist awards ====
- Non-finalist Talent: Sharon Knickmeyer (1956), Frances Biesemeyer (1970), Heather Smith (1989), Whitney Weeks (2005)

==== Other awards ====
- Dr. David B. Allman Medical Scholarship: Ann Marie Sun (1995)
- Beacom College STEM Scholarship: Simone Esters (2020)
- Quality of Life Award Finalists: Tara Osseck (2010)
- Roller Chair Parade Grand Prize: Charlotte Nash (1923)
- AHA Go Red for Women Leadership Award Regional Winner: Courtney Rowe (2026)
- Quality of Life Award 2nd Runner-Up: Tabitha Crain (2027)

== Winners ==
- Declared as winner
- Ended as a runner-up
- Ended as a finalist or semi-finalist

Year	Name	Hometown	Age	Local Title	Miss America Talent	Placement at Miss America	Special scholarships at Miss America	Notes
2026	Tabitha Crain	Strafford	24	Miss Pulaski County	Gymnastics Routine		Qualify of Life Award 2nd Runner-Up	Previously Miss Missouri Volunteer 2025; Top 16 at Miss Volunteer America 2026
2025	Courtney Rowe	Kansas City	23	Miss Kansas City	Jazz Dance		AHA Go Red for Women Leadership Award Regional Winner	
2024	Ashley Berry	Clinton	20	Miss Kansas City	Contemporary Ballet en Pointe, "Eleanor Rigby"			Previously Miss Missouri's Outstanding Teen 2021
2023	Hayley Leach	St.Louis	25	Miss Southern Missouri	Monologue			
2022	Claire Marie Kuebler	Wildwood	21	Miss Spirit of St. Louis	Vocal			
2021	Callie Cox	Mexico	21	Miss Zona Rosa	Vocal			
2019–20	Simone Esters	Columbia	20	Miss Metro St. Louis	Baton Twirling, "Turn the Beat Around"	2nd runner-up	Beacom College STEM Scholarship	Founded Writeous Girls, Inc., a nonprofit mentoring program that works to empower young women through the craft of writing
2018	Katelyn Lewis	Lake St. Louis	22	Miss Fleur De Lis	Vocal, "Memory" from Cats			
2017	Jennifer Davis	St. Charles	23	Miss Jackson	Bollywood Dance, "Naacho Re"	1st runner-up		Published author of children's book, Diversity Matters
2016	Erin O'Flaherty	St. Louis	23	Miss City of Fountains	Vocal			First openly gay contestant to compete at Miss America
2015	McKensie Garber	Hale	22	Miss Gateway St. Louis	Jazz Ballet en Pointe, "P.Y.T."			Previously Miss Missouri's Outstanding Teen 2011
2014	Jessica Hartman	Pueblo	23	Miss Springfield	Dance, "Steppin' Out with My Baby"			Previously Miss Colorado USA 2010; 3rd runner-up at Miss USA 2010 pageant Previously Miss Intercontinental 2011
2013	Shelby Ringdahl	Columbia	21	Miss Springfield	Vocal, "Defying Gravity" from Wicked	Top 12		
2012	Tippe Emmott	Springfield	21	Miss Branson	Ballet en Pointe, "Un Dia Llegara"			1st runner-up at National Sweetheart 2011 pageant
2011	Sydney Friar	El Dorado Springs	22	Miss Branson	Vocal, "Dream On"			
2010	Erika Hebron	O'Fallon	23	Miss Gateway St. Louis	Lyrical Dance, "Dream In Color"			
2009	Tara Osseck	St. Charles	23	Miss Lake of the Ozarks	Tap Dance, "Sing, Sing, Sing"		Quality of Life Award Finalist	
2008	Lacey Fitzgerald	Kansas City	24	Miss Gateway of the West	Vocal			
2007	Lindsay Casmaer	Florissant	24	Miss River City	Ballet en Pointe, "Piano Fantasy"			
2006	Sarah French	Columbia	21	Miss Mid-Missouri	Vocal, "I've Got the World on a String"			Previously Miss Arkansas Teen USA 2004; Named Miss Photogenic at Miss Teen USA 2004 pageant
2005	Stacie Cooley	Liberty	22	Miss Columbia	Jazz Dance, "Last Dance"			
2004	Whitney Weeks	Chesterfield	24	Miss Jackson	Tap Dance, "Tico-Tico no Fubá"		Non-finalist Talent Award	Daughter of Miss West Virginia 1961, Carole Johnson
2003	Amber Etheridge	St. Louis	23	Miss Northwest Missouri	Vocal, "Don't Let the Sun Go Down on Me"	Top 15		
2002	Shandi Finnessey	Florissant	24	Miss Metro St. Louis	Piano, "Bumble Boogie"		Preliminary Evening Gown Award	Later Miss Missouri USA 2004 Later Miss USA 2004 1st runner-up at Miss Universe 2004 pageant
2001	Jennifer Hover	Springfield	23	Miss Springfield	Vocal Medley, "Somewhere" & "Over the Rainbow"	Top 20		
2000	Arron Wendel	Lawson	23	Miss Ray County	Modern Dance, "This Is Your Time"			
1999	Patryce King	New Cambria	23	Miss Mid-Missouri	Piano, Rhapsody in Blue			
1998	Deborah McDonald	Alton	24	Miss West Plains	Vocal, "I Will Always Love You"	3rd runner-up		
1997	Michele Eise	St. Louis	24	Miss Malden	Gospel Vocal, "How Great Thou Art"			
1996	Kimberly Massaro	St. Louis	24	Miss Mid-Missouri	Tap Dance, "Favorite Son" from The Will Rogers Follies	4th runner-up		
1995	Erin Phillips	Mexico	23	Miss Audrain	Tap Dance to Gershwin Medley			
1994	Ann Marie Sun	Springfield	22	Miss Mid-Missouri	Piano		Dr. David B. Allman Medical Scholarship	
1993	Amber Green	Steelville	23	Miss North Central	Piano, "Battle Hymn of the Republic"			
1992	Stephanie Patterson	Kansas City	23	Miss Aurora	Vocal Medley, "I Have Dreamed" & "If I Loved You"	Top 10		
1991	Soncee Brown	Springfield	24	Miss Lake of the Ozarks	Vocal / Piano, "He Touched Me" from Drat! The Cat!	2nd runner-up		
1990	Sherry Traylor	Mexico	26	Miss North Central	Vocal, "What's New"			
1989	Patricia Ann Meusburger		25	Miss Twin Counties		Did not compete; originally 6th place as a semifinalist, later assumed title after Turner won Miss America 1990 as all of the runners-up declined to take the title		
1989	Debbye Turner	Mexico	23	Miss Columbia	Marimba Medley, "Flight of the Bumblebee," "Csárdás," & "Can-Can"	Winner	Preliminary Lifestyle & Fitness Award	Previously National Sweetheart 1988 as Miss Arkansas Later a medical reporter and anchor for CBS' The Early Show
1988	Heather Smith	Maryland Heights	21	Miss Columbia	Baton Twirling, "Whistler and his Dog" by Arthur Pryor		Non-finalist Talent Award	
1987	Robin Elizabeth Riley	Columbia	25	Miss Columbia	Ballet, "Overture" from Funny Girl	Top 10		Previously Miss Missouri USA 1983
1986	Tamara Tungate	St. Peters	21	Miss North Central	Vocal, "Don't Rain on My Parade" from Funny Girl	4th runner-up	Preliminary Lifestyle & Fitness Award	
1985	Lisa Coverdale	Columbia	24	Miss North Central	Classical Piano			
1984	Anna Schell	Kennett	26	Miss Springfield	Semi-classical Vocal, Medley from The Sound of Music			
1983	Barbara Webster	Jefferson City	21	Miss Santa Fe Trails	Violin Medley, "Listen to the Mocking Bird" & "Orange Blossom Special"	Top 10	Preliminary Talent Award	Later Miss Missouri USA 1986
1982	Julie Phillips	Ava	18	Miss Queen of the Ozarks	Classical/Jazz Piano			
1981	Theresa McDonnell	Florissant	22	Miss Trenton	Vocal, "Let's Hear it for Me" from Funny Lady			
1980	Carla LeFevre	Harrisonville	22	Miss Kansas City	Semi-classical Vocal, "And This Is My Beloved"			
1979	Susan Wilson	Columbia	21	Miss Jefferson County	Piano, Fantaisie-Impromptu	3rd runner-up		
1978	Tamara Fister	Poplar Bluff	21	Miss St. Louis	Vocal, "Beautiful"			
1977	Jayne Scherder	Bowling Green	20	Miss William Woods College	Piano, "The Firefly"			
1976	Marcia Kolich	Sugar Creek	22	Miss Jackson County	Jazz Dance, "Everything's Coming up Roses," "On Broadway," & "That's Entertainment!"			
1975	Rebecca Rives	Stoutsville	22	Miss Kirksville	Vocal Medley, "The Trolley Song" & "Over the Rainbow"			
1974	Michelle Marshall	Florissant	20	Miss St. Louis	Vocal / Dance, "Sweet Charity" from Sweet Charity			
1973	Terri Dodson	Fulton	22	Miss William Woods College	Piano, "Dizzy Fingers"			
1972	Anita Columbo	St. Louis	21	Miss St. Louis	Vocal / Dance, "It's Today" from Mame			
1971	Deborah Duff	Kansas City	19	Miss Kansas City	Modern Jazz Dance, "Big Noise from Winnetka"			
1970	Marcia Mossbarger	Brookfield	22	Miss Brookfield	Tap Dance, "Raindrops Keep Fallin' on My Head"			
1969	Frances Biesemeyer	New Franklin	18	Miss Fayette	Art Presentation, "Talk to the Animals"		Non-finalist Talent Award	
1968	Kathleen Goff	DeSoto	21	Miss Southwest Missouri State College	Vocal, "I'm Gonna Live til I Die"			
1967	Ronnee Brunk	St. Louis	19	Miss Camdenton	Vocal, "I Feel a Song Coming On"			
1966	Janice Robinson	Marshfield	20	Miss Southwest Missouri State College	Skit with Piano, Vocal, & Dance, "Calling Billy Names"			
1965	Lesley Fleenor	Springfield	20	Miss West Plains	Vocal, "Hard Hearted Hannah"			
1964	Carol Browning	Lee's Summit	20	Miss Lee's Summit	Marimba & Accordion Medley			
1963	Judith Engelhardt	Affton		Miss St. Charles	Classical Vocal, "The Jewel Song" from Faust			
1962	Sandra Lyle	Springfield	19	Miss Springfield	Dramatic Reading, "The Potion Scene" from Romeo & Juliet			
1961	Sarah Burns	Caruthersville	20	Miss Caruthersville	Vocal / Dance, "Put on a Happy Face" from Bye Bye Birdie			
1960	Dusene Vunovich	Kansas City	19	Miss Kansas City	Vocal, "Honey Bun" from South Pacific			
1959	Linda Long	Independence	19	Miss Independence	Dramatic Reading from The White Cliffs of Dover			
1958	Marjorie Critten	Kansas City		Miss Kansas City	Tap Dance, "Opus No. 1"			
1957	Sara Cooper	Buckner		Miss Kansas City	Charleston Dance	Top 10	Preliminary Talent Award	Daughter of Major League Baseball player, Walker Cooper
1956	Roseann Teri	St. Louis		Miss St. Louis	Dress Design			
1955	Sharon Knickmeyer	St. Louis		Miss St. Louis	Synchronized Swimming		Non-finalist Talent Award	
1954	Carole Jean Wilkinson	Maplewood	18	Miss Maplewood	Vocal			Carole Jean Wilkinson Peipher died at age 89 on May 25, 2026 in Willow Street, Pennsylvania.
1953	Laura Holmes	Northwoods		Miss Northwoods	Dance			
1952	Florence Spack	Clayton		Miss Clayton	Vocal			
1951	Carol Romann	St. Charles		Miss St. Charles	Bassoon			
1950	Beverly Rotroff	Kansas City		Miss Kansas City	Vocal / Piano			
1949	Mary Stone	Jefferson City		Miss Jefferson City				
1948	Dorothy Smith	Kansas City		Miss Kansas City				
1947	Mary Jean Burke	Kansas City		Miss Kansas City	Vocal, "I'm a Big Girl Now"			
1946	Nadine LaVerne Fugett	Kansas City		Miss Kansas City				Competed under local title at Miss America pageant
1945	Betty Ream	Hughesville		Miss Hughesville				
1944	No Missouri representative at Miss America pageant							
1943	Emma Jean Adams	St. Louis		Miss St. Louis				Competed under local title at Miss America pageant
1942	No Missouri representative at Miss America pageant							
1941	Leila Bell Wright	Kansas City		Miss Kansas City				Multiple Missouri representatives Contestants competed under local title at Miss America pageant
1941	Geraldine Koehler	St. Louis		Miss Missouri				Multiple Missouri representatives Contestants competed under local title at Miss America pageant
1940	Gloria Kathleen Gipson	Kansas City		Miss Kansas City				Multiple Missouri representatives Contestants competed under local title at Miss America pageant
1940	Virginia Morrison	St. Louis		Miss Missouri		Top 15		Multiple Missouri representatives Contestants competed under local title at Miss America pageant
1940	LaFern Mueller	St. Louis		Miss St. Louis				Multiple Missouri representatives Contestants competed under local title at Miss America pageant
1939	Margaret Ley	St. Louis		Miss St. Louis				
1938	No Missouri representative at Miss America pageant							
1937	Mary Sue Klein	Moberly		Miss Moberly				Multiple Missouri representatives Contestants competed under local title at Miss America pageant
1937	Wauneta Bates	St. Louis		Miss St. Louis		Top 16		Multiple Missouri representatives Contestants competed under local title at Miss America pageant
1936	Margaret Price	Lexington		Miss Lexington				
1935	Edna Smith	Fayette	19	Miss Fayette	Piano / Vocal, "Prelude No. 20 by Chopin" & "When Day Is Done"	1st runner-up		Edna Smith Glenn died at age 90 on June 10, 2007.
1934	No national pageant was held							
1933	Marie LaTourette Marks	St. Louis	16		N/A	Top 18		
1932	No national pageants were held							
1931	No national pageants were held							
1930	No national pageants were held							
1929	No national pageants were held							
1928	No national pageants were held							
1927	Marion Kenser			Miss Kansas City	N/A			Multiple Missouri representatives Contestants competed under local title at Miss America pageant
1927	Katherine Calloway			Miss Missouri	N/A			Multiple Missouri representatives Contestants competed under local title at Miss America pageant
1926	Marguerite Jordan			Miss Kansas City	N/A	Top 15		Multiple Missouri representatives Contestants competed under local title at Miss America pageant
1926	Ruby Wallace			Miss Missouri	N/A			Multiple Missouri representatives Contestants competed under local title at Miss America pageant
1926	Corinne Groves			Miss St. Louis	N/A	Top 15		Multiple Missouri representatives Contestants competed under local title at Miss America pageant
1925	Eileen Wenzel			Miss St. Louis	N/A			Competed under local title at Miss America pageant
1924	Helen Moore			Miss St. Louis	N/A			Competed under local title at Miss America pageant
1923	Charlotte Nash	St. Louis	17	Miss St. Louis	N/A	3rd runner-up	Roller Chair Parade Grand Prize	Competed under local title at national pageant Married millionaire and theatre magnate, Fred Nixon-Nirdlinger, twice Shot and killed Nixon-Nirdlinger in March 1931 in Nice, France; Was acquitted after successfully arguing act was in self-defense
1922	Miriam Chafee	Kansas City		Miss Kansas City	N/A			Multiple Missouri representatives Contestants competed under local title at national pageant
1922	Mildred Hose	St. Louis		Miss St. Louis	N/A			Multiple Missouri representatives Contestants competed under local title at national pageant
1921	No Missouri representative at Miss America pageant							
