= Alissa Musto =

American singer, pianist and songwriter

- Origin: Providence, Rhode Island, U.S.
- Occupations: Musician, child pianist, singer
- Instruments: Vocals; Piano
- Website: http://www.alissamusto.com

Alissa Musto is an American singer, pianist and songwriter. As a child she won piano competitions while placed in older divisions and debuted on the national series America's Most Talented Kid at nine years old. She is best known for being crowned Miss Massachusetts 2016 and competing at the 2017 Miss America Pageant, where she placed in the top 15.

== Early life ==
Growing up in Massachusetts, Musto started studying classical piano at five years old, inspired by her father, Billy Musto, a professional pianist. Performing pieces by Mozart, Beethoven and Bach, Musto won several piano competitions, talent shows and was featured on local television and news programs including NBC's "Spotlight On the Student Artist". To help her combat stage fright, Musto's father took her to nursing homes where she would regularly perform for the residents. In February 2005, at the age of nine, Musto made her debut on national television, America's Most Talented Kid. She performed a medley of Mozart and Jerry Lee Lewis.

Upon returning home from the show, Musto won several large regional talent competitions including New England Performs, Rhode Island's Got Talent and Talent Quest TV Show. Juggling a rigorous academic schedule along with her musical endeavors, Alissa received national recognition as one of four nationwide artists to be sponsored by Music & Arts Center with new musical equipment and scholarships as part of their "Find Your Voice" competition, "Piano Act of the Year" in the Wonderworld TV Golden Ribby Awards, top 3 in the Music On & Up Showcase grand finale, top 10 (out of 45,000 entires] in KidzBop KidzStar USA and a nomination for "Female Vocalist of the Year" in the 2011 Limelight Music Awards.

Musto became a spokesperson for the environmental organization, Project GreenSchools. As a "Green Rocker Ambassador", she was a featured performer on several New England tour dates at schools, fairs and other venues. Additionally, Musto wrote the program's theme song, which she was invited to perform at the Massachusetts State House, where she was presented with a citation from the Massachusetts House of Representatives presented her with a citation.

Until high school, Musto attended St. Mary Academy – Bay View, an all-girls, Catholic school, where she was the pianist in the orchestra. She then attended the Providence Country Day School, where she was a member of the jazz ensemble and captain of both state-championship winning tennis and mock trial teams. Dubbed "Rising Stars of Jazz", Alissa's high school jazz quartet was selected to open for trumpet legend, Wynton Marsalis at the Veterans Memorial Auditorium (Providence, Rhode Island).

== Original music ==
On January 5, 2015, Musto released her debut album, What We Saw From the Piano Bar, the same day her biggest inspiration, Bruce Springsteen, released his debut album in 1973. Immediately following the release, her single “Black Flak” beat out dozens of artists in the MusicToVideo contest and was featured on radio shows and blogs nationally, including SiriusXM radio. One of six participants from over 4,300 submissions, she was also selected for the House of Blues Bringing Down the House Class of 2015 and chosen as the winner of the Justine Magazine Talent Search and Needham Music Awards. After successfully completing the program, Musto was invited to serve on the Music Forward Foundation Alumni Advisory Board and contribute to the Foundation's compilation album.

On March 15, 2018, Musto released an acoustic EP entitled X Post Facto. In addition to being featured on numerous radio shows, blogs and podcasts, the project earned her a nomination for "Songwriter of the Year" in the 2019 New England Music Awards.

== Notable performances ==
Alissa has performed on stages across the northeast and beyond including the House of Blues, the Hard Rock Cafe, Foxwoods Resort & Casino, the Rhode Island Convention Center, the Wang Theatre, Boston's prestige hotels, restaurants, universities and events for Fortune 500 companies, charities and political candidates. She has maintained long-term weekly residencies in the region's premiere venues and is a preferred entertainer within New England's top agencies. She has built a local following as a cast member in the popular Point Street Dueling pianos show, Rhode Island's only rock and roll piano show, and through her weekly piano bar sing-along at the historic Jacob Wirth Restaurant, Boston's second oldest restaurant.

From May–October 2017, Alissa was a guest pianist in the Ocean Liners: Glamour, Speed, and Style exhibit at the Peabody Essex Museum and performed on 1935 baby grand piano that once graced Normandie's Deauville suite.

As a performer for Billboard On board, the pop piano show aboard Holland America’s luxury cruise ships, and a resident guest entertainer for Princess Cruiselines. Alissa has dazzled audiences while sailing throughout Europe, the Mediterranean, Mexico, Hawaii, Alaska, Central America, the South Pacific, Australia and New Zealand.

== Pageantry ==
=== Miss Massachusetts 2016 ===
On July 2, 2016, at the Hanover Theatre in Worcester, Massachusetts, Musto was crowned Miss Massachusetts 2016 by outgoing Miss Massachusetts 2015, Meagan Fuller, beating out 24 other contestants. In addition to the title, Musto won over $12,000 in scholarship money and additional awards for her talent and community service accomplishments. As Miss Massachusetts, her activities included public appearances across the state of Massachusetts. Several times throughout her reign, Musto received heightened attention due to controversial statements on Twitter, including her sarcastic responses to mean tweets following the live Miss America telecast.

=== Miss America 2017 ===
Musto was Massachusetts' representative at the Miss America 2017 pageant held in Atlantic City, New Jersey, on September 11, 2016 with a platform of "Changing Keys - Connecting Kids with Keyboards". Musto placed in the top 15 finalists, being eliminated after the swimsuit competition and earned a $4,000 scholarship award.

=== Miss Massachusetts World 2020 ===
In 2020, Musto was named as Miss Massachusetts World 2020 and was crowned by outgoing titleholder Rachel Miller.

=== Miss World America 2020 ===
Representing Massachusetts, Musto placed in the Top 5 at Miss World America 2020. She also earned the Beauty with a Purpose and Talent awards.

== Other media ==
In 2022, Musto competed on the second episode of the USA Network reality competition series Snake in the Grass. She was also a contestant on Season 1 of the Fox game show We Are Family

== Philanthropy ==
An active supporter of music education, Musto dedicated her year of service as Miss Massachusetts to continuing the music education efforts she implemented as Miss Tri-County 2015 and Miss Cambridge 2016: bringing music programs into at-risk schools and speaking to students and community leaders throughout the Commonwealth about the benefits of arts education. Alissa has also volunteered with numerous arts and education organizations including the Boston Symphony Orchestra, Girls Rock!, Harvard Reading Buddies, CityArts! and Headstart. Her platform, Changing Keys, connects unused pianos with students and schools in at-risk communities and was selected for the Harvard Legal Entrepreneurship Project, the Club Passim Iguana Music Fund grant and the Miss America Community Service scholarship.

== Personal life ==
When not traveling, Musto resides in the South End, Boston neighborhood of Boston. She earned her Master of Music in Music Business & Entertainment Industries from the University of Miami Frost School of Music and her academic work has been published in the Berklee Music Business Journal. Musto is a pescatarian. She is of Lebanese heritage.

Awards and achievements
Preceded by Meagan Fuller	Miss Massachusetts; 2016	Succeeded by Jillian Zucco
Preceded by Rachel Miller	Miss Massachusetts World; 2020	Succeeded by Caroline Cooney
