= Providence Country Day School =

Private school in Providence, Rhode Island, US

Location
- East Providence, Rhode Island; United States; 41.8168532°N 71.35275°W

Information
- Type: Private, coeducational, college preparatory
- Motto: Play the Game
- Established: 1923
- Head of School: Kevin Folan
- Faculty: 50
- Grades: PreK-12
- Gender: Co-Ed
- Enrollment: 375
- Average class size: 12
- Student to teacher ratio: 1:12
- Colors: Red and Black
- Athletics conference: NEPSAC, RIIL
- Mascot: Knight
- Website: http://www.providencecountryday.org/

The Providence Country Day School (often abbreviated to the initials PCD) is a co-educational independent school founded in 1923. Located in East Providence, Rhode Island, United States, it serves 445 students in grades PreK through 12. The school has no religious affiliation and has been co-ed since 1991. It has maintained accreditation by the New England Association of Schools and Colleagues (NEASC) since 1952.

== Administration ==
- Head of School - Kevin Folan
- Associate Head of School - Mark McLaughlin

== History ==
In 1923, a group of business leaders, educators, and parents established Providence Country Day on the Sweetland Farm in East Providence. Their goal was to create a college-preparatory school in a rural setting, that would provide both the advantages of a boarding school campus and the additional benefits of a day school. Initially an all-boys middle and high school, the school admitted its first female students in 1991.

In 1997, the school completed an extensive campus consolidation and building project, renovating and moving two historic buildings, Metcalf and Chace Halls, to the east side of campus. At that time, Murray House also opened as the new administration building, and the Moran Annex was added to the West Field House, expanding the school’s athletic facilities.

The school made national news in October 2020 with its release of a bold new initiative: "The Quest." This comprehensive plan included a dramatic tuition reset of 36% to make the cost of quality education more accessible, as well as a new partnership with Hudson Global Scholars to offer Providence Country Day Global Campus, allowing students unable to attend PCD in person to benefit from the challenging curriculum and college preparatory courses.

On March 9, 2021, a partnership was announced between PCD and the Henry Barnard School (HBS), a historic elementary school founded in 1898. HBS had been facing closure at the end of the 2020-2021 academic year before a group of dedicated alumni and parents announced plans to re-open as a newly independent school. Beginning in the 2021-2022 academic year, PCD assumed financial responsibility and leadership for the elementary school, offering continuity for the historic school and its teachers and students. HBS and PCD operated for two school years as one school community with two campuses, with PCD Head of School Kevin Folan serving as Head of School for both campuses.

On March 8, 2023, almost exactly 2 years from the initial announcement that HBS would join PCD, the school announced a multi-million dollar renovation to consolidate onto the East Providence campus for the 2023-2024 school year.

Metcalf Hall was renovated over the summer of 2023 to create new classroom space for middle school upstairs and to adapt the classrooms on the first floor for elementary school, with new furniture and a playground space.

In 2025, ground was broken on the Suzanne Young Murray Arts Center, opening in September of 2026. The 12,000 square foot facility includes a state-of-the-art theater, an art gallery, and new classrooms for visual arts and music, as well as a dedicated maker space. With the movement of all arts classes to the SYMAC, additional renovations to Metcalf Hall will create additional classrooms, allowing for enrollment growth while maintaining PCD's signature small class sizes.

== Teams ==
PCD participates in athletic contests under the jurisdiction of the Rhode Island Interscholastic League (RIIL). PCD is proud to be a Safe Sports School. There are 18 different sports played at PCD at the Middle School, Junior Varsity, and Varsity levels of competition. Athletic teams compete in either the Rhode Island Interscholastic League or the SENE division of the New England Preparatory School Athletic Conference, and each year at least 30% of the teams compete in league championships. In the fall PCD offers Cross Country, Soccer, Football, Volleyball (girls), Fencing, and Tennis (girls). Winter sports include Basketball, Gymnastics, Indoor Track & Field, Swimming, and Wrestling. In the spring PCD competes in Baseball, Golf, Lacrosse, Softball, Track & Field, and Tennis (boys). The school's commitment to the participation in all areas of school life requires that students participate in the PCD athletic program.

== Notable alumni ==
- Billy Andrade, professional golfer
- Geoff Cameron, midfielder, Stoke City F.C., US National Team
- John Chafee, U.S. Senator from Rhode Island, Governor of Rhode Island
- Ken Read, Sailor
- Alissa Musto, Miss Massachusetts 2016
- Jeff Buxton, wrestling coach
- Marcos Ugarte, assistant coach for USL Championship club Rhode Island FC
- Benjamin Wilcox, Emmy Award winning news producer, television news executive
