= Miss Massachusetts' Teen =

Miss America's Teen state pageant

- Formation: 2000
- Type: Beauty pageant
- Headquarters: North Attleboro
- Location: Massachusetts
- Members: Miss America's Teen
- Official language: English
- Key people: Rocky Graziano - Director
- Website: Official website

The Miss Massachusetts' Teen competition is the pageant that selects the representative for the U.S. state of Massachusetts in the Miss America's Teen pageant.

Lyahnette Morales of Lawrence was crowned Miss Massachusetts' Teen on June 18, 2026, at the Hanover Theatre in Worcester, Massachusetts. She competed for the title of Miss America's Teen 2027 on September 5, 2026, at the Kravis Center for the Performing Arts in West Palm Beach, Florida.

== Results summary ==
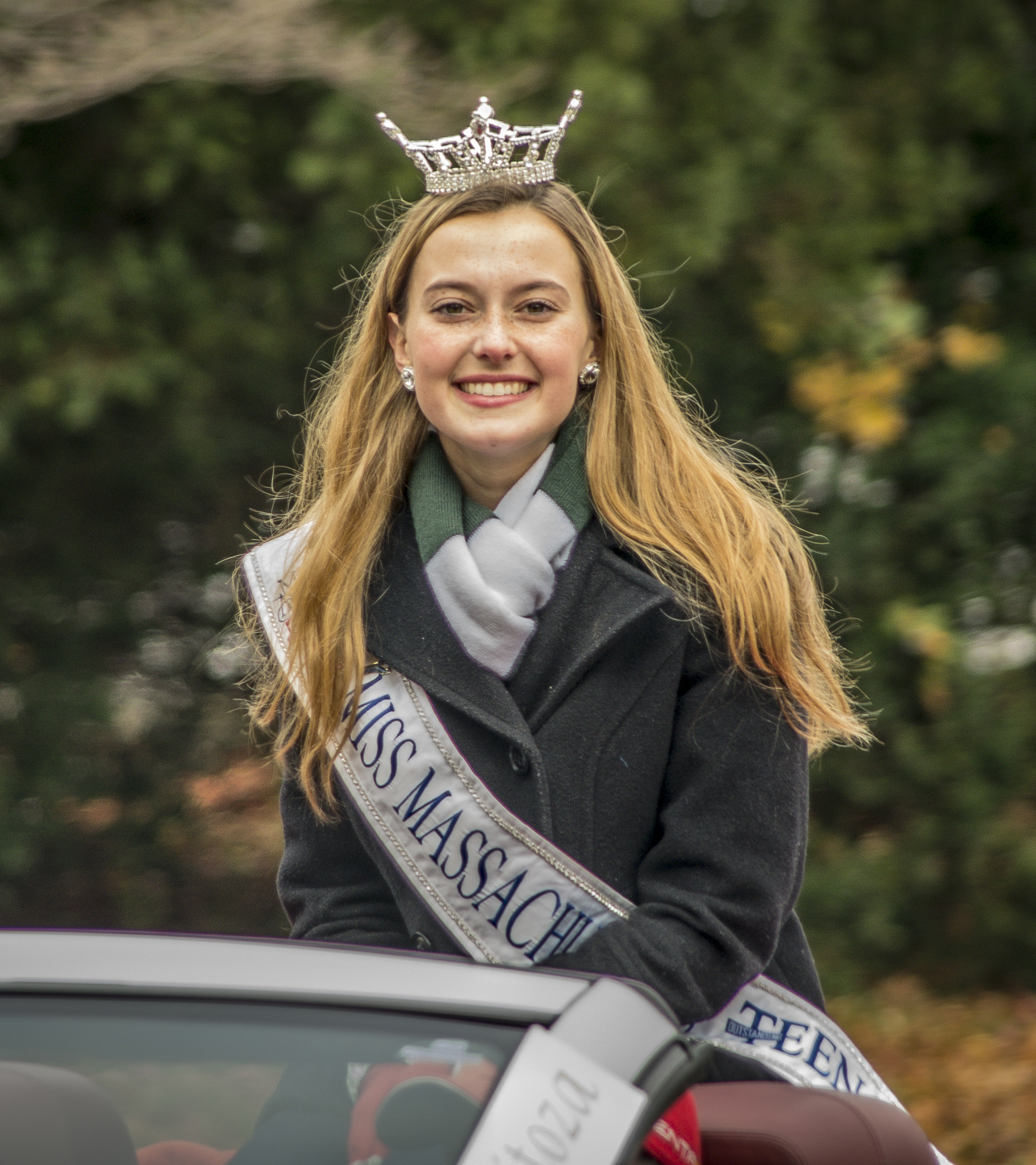
Alyssa Maitoza, Miss Massachusetts' Outstanding Teen 2016

The year in parentheses indicates year of Miss America's Outstanding Teen competition the award/placement was garnered.

=== Placements ===
- Top 10: Chelsea Marie Leclerc (2007)

=== Awards ===
==== Non-finalist awards ====
- Non-finalist Talent: Alyssa Maitoza (2017)

==== Other awards ====
- Children's Miracle Network (CMN) Miracle Maker Award: Carly Fisher (2018)
- Outstanding Dance Talent Award: Alyssa Maitoza (2017)
- Teens in Action Finalists: Amy de Silva (2012), Rachel Michelle-Marie Perry (2020), Jenna McLaughlin (2023)

== Winners ==
- Declared as winner
- Ended as a runner-up
- Ended as a finalist or semi-finalist

Year	Name	Hometown	Age	Local title	Talent	Placement at MA's Teen	Special scholarships at MA's Teen	Notes
2026	Lyahnette Raquelle Morales	Lawrence	17	Miss Boston’s Teen	Jazz Dance			
2025	Ava Dooley	Shrewsbury	17	Miss Freedom Trail's Teen	Jazz Dance "Mambo Italiano"			Dancer in Miss Massachusetts Troupe 4 years prior to winning
2024	Maggie Leighton	Leominster	17	Miss Cranberry County's Teen	Vocal "Painted Black"			Valedictorian Leominster HS Attending Harvard
2023	Emma Gibney	New Bedford	17	Miss Blackstone Valley's Teen	Herstory "Stay"			
2022	Jenna McLaughlin	Medford	17	Miss Boston's Outstanding Teen	Vocal		Teens in Action Finalist	
2021	Tess O'Riordan	Canton	17	At-large	Jazz Dance "Feeling Good"			Miss Boston's Outstanding Teen 2019 placing 3rd runner up at the state pageant 2nd runner-up at Miss Massachusetts 2026
2019-20	Rachel Michelle-Marie Perry	New Bedford	17	At-large	Rock Fiddle, "Walk This Way"		Teens in Action Award Finalist	
2018	Jordan St. Onge	Acushnet	17	Miss Boston's Outstanding Teen	Irish Step Dance, "Roundtable Rival" by Lindsey Stirling			
2017	Carly Fisher	West Bridgewater	15	Miss Boston's Outstanding Teen	Speed Painting		Children's Miracle Network Miracle Maker Award	Sister of Miss Vermont 2019-2020, Jillian Fisher
2016	Alyssa Maitoza	Dartmouth	16	Miss New Bedford's Outstanding Teen	Tap Dance, “This Must Be Pop” by N*SYNC		Outstanding Dance Talent Award Non-finalist Talent Award	1st runner-up at Miss Massachusetts 2018 pageant 4th runner-up at Miss Massachusetts 2021
2015	Alexandra Berube	Methuen	17	Miss Boston's Outstanding Teen	Vocal			Played Lorraine Baines-McFly in the U.S. National Tour of "Back to the Future: The Musical." Previously played Anne Boleyn in the U.S. National Tour of "Six". Made Off-Broadway Debut as Heather Chandler in Heathers: The Musical (2026).
2014	Courtney Adelman	Middleborough	17	Miss Bristol County's Outstanding Teen	Vocal, "Home" from Beauty and the Beast			
2013	Kristina Ayanian	Burlington	15		Classical Piano, “Tarantella” by Moritz Moszkowski			Later Miss Armenia and competed at Miss Grand International 2021 & Miss Universe 2022 1st runner-up at Miss Massachusetts 2021
2012	Amy de Silva	Dartmouth	16	Miss New Bedford's Outstanding Teen	Vocal			Diagnosed with Charcot-Marie-Tooth disease
2011	Sydney Levin-Epstein	East Longmeadow	16	Miss Western Massachusetts' Outstanding Teen	Dance			
2010	Kendall Wipff	Andover	17	Miss Worcester's Outstanding Teen	Vocal			1st runner-up at Miss New Hampshire 2013 pageant
2009	Brianna Bostick	East Tauton	16		Vocal, "Home" from The Wiz			2nd runner-up at Miss Massachusetts 2012 pageant
2008	Taylor Kinzler	Lakeville	16	-	Dance			Later Miss Massachusetts 2012
2007	Hillary Pavao	Dartmouth						
2006	Cherise Marie Leclerc	Hampden		-	Harp	Top 10		4th runner-up at Miss Massachusetts 2008 pageant
2005	Tanya Lee Bonenfant	Taunton	17	-	Lyrical Dance			
2004	Alana Megna					No national pageant		
2003	Meghan Joyce					No national pageant		Later Massachusetts' Junior Miss 2004
2002	Jennifer Bowen					No national pageant		
2001	Valerie Amaral	Acushnet	15		Vocal	No national pageant		Later Miss Massachusetts 2007
2000	Fallon Branco					No national pageant		
