= Michaela Gagne =

American beauty pageant contestant

Michaela J. Gagne (born September 23, 1982) was crowned Miss Massachusetts in June 2006. She is a resident of Fall River, Massachusetts. She received her BFA in art with a minor in psychology from the University of Massachusetts Amherst. In 2006, she completed her master's degree in Mental Health Counselling and Art Therapy from Lesley University.

As Miss Massachusetts, her Platform Issue was Heart Health: Listen, Learn, and Live, which was a reaction to having been diagnosed with a life-threatening heart condition and having undergone surgery for an internal cardiac defibrillator at the age of 17. She is currently a national spokesperson for the American Heart Association’s Go Red for Women campaign, and she has traveled to Capitol Hill several times to speak with members of Congress regarding the work that must be done regarding heart disease.

Gagne is a national spokesperson for the SADS (Sudden Arrhythmia Death Syndrome) Foundation, as well as Parent Heart Watch, a group of parents making great strides in legislative and national awareness in memory of the children they have lost to Sudden Cardiac Arrest. Gagne also serves as an international spokesperson for Heartbeat International, an organization that provides surgery and the means for pacemakers, defibrillators, and other devices to be implanted in some of the one million people who are dying every year without these procedures. In addition, Gagne continues to campaign on local and national levels to make Automated External Defibrillators mandatory in our schools. Gagne has been interviewed nationally on CNN, Fox News and Inside Edition, as well as being featured in various publications including USA Today, Newsweek online (personally written article) and The Boston Globe.

Despite her heart condition, Gagne is an accomplished athlete, competing regularly in soccer and basketball, and is an MIAA certified high school track and field coach. She is currently an art teacher at St. Vincent's Home, a residential/educational facility for children in need, as well as providing crisis/adjustment counseling in the Fall River school system. Her volunteer work ranges from traveling to Africa to set up a medical clinic in the Bukoba region of Tanzania, to being a mentor for the Peaceful Coalition, a student group consisting of gang-involved and/or at-risk males.

“At 17 years old, my life was squarely put in perspective when I was told I could have died during the first unprotected years of my life. I turned my obstacles into opportunities, and my work is done in the memory of those who were not given that second chance.”
