= Meagan Fuller =

American beauty pageant titleholder

- Born: Meagan Elise Fuller; September 25, 1992 (age 34); Lowell, Massachusetts, U.S.
- Education: University of Alabama; Emerson College; Tulane University
- Beauty pageant titleholder
- Title: Junior Miss 2010; Miss Plymouth County 2013; Miss Boston 2014; Miss Collegiate Area 2015; Miss Massachusetts 2015
- Hair color: Black
- Major competition: Miss America 2016

Meagan Elise Fuller (born September 25, 1992) is an American beauty pageant titleholder from Attleboro, Massachusetts, who was named Massachusetts' Junior Miss 2010 and crowned Miss Massachusetts 2015. She competed for the Miss America 2016 title in September 2015.

== Pageant career ==
=== Early pageants ===
Fuller began competing in pageants at the age of 10. As a teen, Fuller was chosen as Massachusetts' Junior Miss 2010 and earned $3,600 in scholarship prizes. Competing for the national title, she was a top 10 finalist at the Distinguished Young Women of America 2010 program at the Mobile Civic Center in Mobile, Alabama.

On March 10, 2013, Fuller won the Miss Plymouth County 2013 title. As one of 21 qualifiers, she competed in the 2013 Miss Massachusetts pageant with the platform "Knocking Out Dropping Out: Promising Youth Success in School" and a jazz dance performance in the talent portion of the competition. She was named first runner-up to winner Amanda Narciso and earned $1,400 in scholarship prizes. As first runner-up, Fuller represented Massachusetts at the 2013 National Sweetheart pageant in Hoopeston, Illinois. She placed first runner-up for the national title.

On February 16, 2014, Fuller won the Miss Boston 2014 title. She also won the top talent and photogenic awards. Fuller competed in the 2014 Miss Massachusetts pageant with the platform "Knocking Out Dropping Out: Promising Youth Success in School" and a dance performance in the talent portion of the competition. She was named third runner-up to winner Lauren Kuhn and earned an $1,800 scholarship prize.

=== Miss Massachusetts 2015 ===
In March 2015, Fuller was crowned Miss Collegiate Area 2015 and qualified for a third entry to the state pageant. She entered the Miss Massachusetts pageant at Worcester's Hanover Theatre for the Performing Arts in late June 2015 as one of 23 qualifiers for the state title. Fuller's competition talent was a jazz dance performance to Jennifer Hudson's cover of "Feeling Good". Her platform is "For the Common Good: Promoting Proactive Healthcare".

Fuller won the competition on Sunday, June 28, 2015, when she received her crown from outgoing Miss Massachusetts titleholder Lauren Kuhn. She earned more than $11,250 in scholarship money and other prizes from the state pageant. As Miss Massachusetts, her activities include public appearances across the state of Massachusetts.

=== Vying for Miss America 2016 ===
Fuller was Massachusetts's representative at the Miss America 2016 pageant in Atlantic City, New Jersey, in September 2015. In the televised finale on September 13, 2015, she placed outside the Top 15 semi-finalists and was eliminated from competition. She was awarded a $3,000 scholarship prize as her state's representative.

== Early life and education ==
Fuller was born in Lowell, Massachusetts, and raised in Attleboro, Massachusetts. She is a 2010 graduate of Attleboro High School. Her father is Brian Fuller and her mother is Lisa Fuller.

Fuller graduated from the University of Alabama in Tuscaloosa in 2012 with a Bachelor of Arts degree in communication studies. In 2013, Fuller began pursuing a master's degree at Emerson College in Boston then in 2014 shifted her studies to the Tulane University School of Public Health and Tropical Medicine in New Orleans, Louisiana, to complete her Master of Public Health degree in 2015.

Awards and achievements
Preceded by Lauren Kuhn	Miss Massachusetts; 2015	Succeeded by Alissa Musto
