= Jeff Buxton =

American wrestling coach

Jeff Buxton is the Assistant Coach of wrestling at Columbia University as of September 2024. Buxton is a 1980 graduate of the University of Rhode Island and started his coaching career shortly thereafter as the head coach at Chariho Regional High School in Hopkington, Rhode Island. He then became the head coach at Blair Academy in 1982.

During an impressive 30-year tenure at Blair, Buxton led the team to 30 consecutive National Prep Championships. Blair secured the No. 1 ranking in the country 10 times with Buxton at the helm. A member of the Rhode Island Wrestling Hall of Fame, and member of the New Jersey Wrestling Hall of Fame, Buxton produced numerous national prep champions and dozens of national freestyle champions at Blair. Alumni coached by Buxton went on to win 12 individual NCAA titles and 41 were crowned NCAA Division I All-Americans. Jeff is also the recipient of USA Wrestling’s Lifetime Achievement.

In 2012, Coach Buxton took the head coaching position at Lehigh University's post-graduate wrestling program, the Lehigh Valley Athletic Club (LVAC). At LVAC, Coach Buxton coached senior-level wrestlers at U S senior National championships, the Pan American Games and the senior World Championships . On a selected basis, he also works with junior wrestlers who are competing internationally.

In 2019, Coach Buxton served as the USA men’s wrestling freestyle coach.

In 2022, Buxton served as the head coach of the Scarlet Knight Regional Training Center at Rutgers University. In his role there, he worked closely with recently hired Columbia wrestling coach, Sebastian Rivera, as Rivera went on to be a World Silver Medalist in 2023 and an Olympic Bronze Medalist in 2024.

As of September 2024, Buxton currently serves as the Assistant Wrestling Coach at Columbia University.

== Personal highlights ==
- 1975 National Prep Wrestling Champion
- Earned 13 varsity letters in wrestling, football and lacrosse
- Wrestled undefeated through four high school seasons
- Named 1975 Rhode Island Athlete of the Year
- Inducted into Providence Country Day School's Athletic High School Hall of Fame
- NCAA Qualifier in college at University of Rhode Island
- In 2018, honored with Lifetime Service to Wrestling award by the New Jersey chapter of the National Wrestling Hall of Fame

== Coaching highlights at Blair Academy (1982–2012) ==
- 30 National Prep Wrestling Tournament Team Championships
- 10 USA High School Wrestling Number One Ranked Teams

== Other honors ==
He received a USA Wrestling's Lifetime Achievement Award during special banquet for the U.S. Olympic Committee and USA Wrestling other featured guest, Greco-Roman Gold Medal Champion Rulon Gardner.

In presenting the Lifetime Achievement Award to Buxton, Blair wrestling parent Alan Meltzer said this about the man who coached his son: "I gave Jeff one of my most prized things in life, my son. The only thing that matters to a parent is his children. Jeff would be a mentor as a wrestling coach and as a human being. We made the right decision. Jeff's record is incredible."

Jeff's teams have been declared national champions among high school teams numerous times, and many of his student-athletes have gone on to become champions and college All-Americans. Jeff is active in the state association, USA Wrestling New Jersey, where he serves as coach for the Cadet National and Junior National USA Teams compeating in Fargo, ND. He is currently serving on New Jersey Coaches Council.
