= Henry Barnard School (Rhode Island) =

Location
- 660 Waterman Ave., East Providence RI 02914
- Coordinates: 41.81686°N 71.35496°W

Information
- Type: Private, co-educational
- Established: 1898
- Faculty: 14
- Grades: Pre-K - 4
- Gender: Co-ed
- Enrollment: 100
- Website: www.providencecountryday.org

Henry Barnard School (often abbreviated to the initials HBS) is a private elementary school, founded in 1898. Until 2020, it was located on the campus of Rhode Island College in Providence, Rhode Island, it served approximately 100 students in grades pre-kindergarten through 5. After the closure of the RIC buildings, Henry Barnard merged with the lower (elementary) school at Providence Country Day School.

== Administration ==
- Head of School - Kevin Folan
- Head of Lower School - Meg Adair

== History ==
Henry Barnard School was founded in 1898 as The Observation School of Rhode Island Normal School – later named Rhode Island College (RIC). It consisted of ten classrooms in the Normal School, where young women trained to become teachers. The Normal School was originally located in downtown Providence. In 1920, the school was renamed in honor of Henry Barnard, Rhode Island’s first commissioner of public schools and the first U.S. commissioner of education, while the Normal School changed its name to Rhode Island College of Education.

In 1928, Henry Barnard School moved out of the Rhode Island College of Education into a separate building, with Dr. Clara Craig, one of the first critic teachers in the Normal School, as principal. The new building had 23 classrooms to accommodate grades K through Grade 9. The school also housed a library, auditorium, art room, cafeteria and a health clinic. Tuition was $75 for Rhode Island students and free for any Providence students unable to afford the tuition. Dr. Mary Tucker Thorp was named principal in 1936 and remained in that position for the next 23 years. During her tenure, the school grew and became nationally known for its reputation for excellence in education. In 1958, Henry Barnard School and Rhode Island College moved to their present location on Mount Pleasant Avenue. In 1969, the junior high was dissolved due to its small size and limited scope. A day care program began at the Henry Barnard School in 1973. In 1984, a full-day Kindergarten was added.

In August 2020, Rhode Island College announced the closure of HBS at the end of the 2020-2021 academic year, due to ongoing budgetary concerns at RIC. This came after years of declining enrollment and operating at a financial loss.

By December 2020, HBS announced that it would remain open as an independent school, ending its affiliation with RIC while remaining on its campus. The Parents Association negotiated a deal with RIC to rent the existing school space.

On March 9, 2021, the HBS Parents Association announced a partnership with Providence Country Day School, beginning in the 2021-2022 academic year. The school would retain the Henry Barnard name with PCD Head of School Kevin Folan serving as Head of School for both campuses, while a Head of Lower School would be hired to manage the HBS campus.

In March 2023, PCD announced that HBS students and faculty would move from the Providence campus to the main PCD campus in East Providence for the 2023-2024 school year. During the summer of 2023, the second floor of PCD's Metcalf Hall was renovated to create brand-new classroom space for the middle school program, while the first floor was renovated to become the Henry Barnard Lower School at Providence Country Day. A new state-of-the-art playground space was also built.

== Henry Barnard's influence ==
When Henry Barnard was appointed as Rhode Island’s first education commissioner in 1842, he campaigned for a state-supported normal school and public school system. Part of his plan was a belief that the normal school should have a model school attached to it, where prospective teachers could apply what they had learned in the classroom. While he was unable to immediately establish the normal school, Barnard greatly improved public education, introducing uniform textbooks to schools across the state and convincing Rhode Islanders to pay higher school taxes to build new school houses and hire more qualified teachers. Barnard also established a professional journal for teachers and helped create a body of professional literature designed to improve teacher quality.

In 1845 the state of Rhode Island gave him the authority to found a normal school. However, the state did not offered any resources, financial or otherwise, to create the school. Barnard was able to gather private supporters who offered property and funds to be matched by public ones. Unfortunately, increasingly poor health forced Barnard to resign his position in 1849. His goal would be achieved in 1851, when Brown University created a small normal department, led by Professor Samuel Stillman Greene, and in the following year, a private normal school opened in Providence. Brown’s success spurred Providence to reopen the Rhode Island Normal School in 1854. Before the school reopened, the Rhode Island General Assembly voted for a $3,000 appropriation to transform the school into a state school. It would be the first fully state-funded normal school in the nation.

== Academics ==
Curriculum is guided by experiential learning and inspired by the Reggio Emilia approach. Younger students learn in a play-based environment, while in upper grades, students conduct their own research and observations, experiencing math, science and other subjects in real-life applications. Weekly classes in art, music, technology education, library, Spanish, and physical education instruction are also offered.
