= McKensie Garber =

American beauty pageant titleholder (born 1994)

- Born: McKenzie Lane Garber; April 25, 1994 (age 32)
- Education: Oral Roberts University
- Beauty pageant titleholder
- Title: Miss Lake of the Ozarks Outstanding Teen 2011; Miss Missouri's Outstanding Teen 2011; Miss Gateway St. Louis 2015; Miss Missouri 2015
- Major competitions: Miss America's Outstanding Teen 2012; Miss America 2016

McKensie Lane Garber (born April 25, 1994) is an American beauty pageant titleholder from Hale, Missouri, who was named Miss Missouri's Outstanding Teen 2011 and crowned Miss Missouri 2015. She competed for the Miss America 2016 title in September 2015.

== Pageant career ==
=== Early pageants ===
Garber began competing in pageants in 2004, following the encouragement of her dance teacher. In 2007, Garber entered the National American Miss pageant system's Miss Missouri Pre-Teen competition. She was chosen as third runner-up to queen Courtney Landes and named Miss Congeniality and Art Contest Winner.

Garber entered the Miss America system in 2008, first winning the title of Miss Branson's Outstanding Teen. She represented the title of Miss Audrain's Outstanding Teen her second year of competition and placed third runner-up at the state pageant. Her third year, she competed at the state pageant as Miss Gateway St. Louis Outstanding Teen and placed first runner-up. In November 2010, she won the title Miss Lake of the Ozarks Outstanding Teen 2011. In June 2011, Garber entered the Miss Missouri's Outstanding Teen 2011 pageant at the Missouri Military Academy in Mexico, Missouri, as a qualifier for the state title. Garber's competition talent was a theatrical dance performance to "I Can Hear the Bells" from the musical Hairspray. Her platform was "Promoting Good Character Among Americans". Garber won the competition on Saturday, June 11, 2011, when she received her crown from outgoing Miss Missouri's Outstanding Teen titleholder Alexandria Black.

Garber was Missouri's representative at the Miss America's Outstanding Teen 2012 pageant in Orlando, Florida, in August 2011. She was not a Top 10 finalist for the national crown but earned a $500 scholarship as the Non-Finalist Evening Wear Award winner.

On August 9, 2013, Garber entered the 2013 Missouri State Fair Queen Pageant as the representative of the Hale Future Farmers of America Alumni. She placed first runner-up to winner Ashley Bauer for that state title.

=== Miss Missouri 2015 ===
Garber took a two-year break from the Miss Missouri pageants, choosing to focus on her college education. She completed her degree at Oral Roberts University with honors in three years. On September 27, 2014, Garber returned to pageant competition and was crowned Miss Gateway St. Louis 2015.

In June 2015, she entered the Miss Missouri 2015 pageant at the Missouri Military Academy in Mexico, Missouri, as one of 25 qualifiers for the state title. Garber's competition talent was a jazz en pointe performance to Michael Jackson's "P.Y.T.". Her platform is "CharacterPlus: Inspiring Lives of Integrity Through Education".

During the interview portion, Garber was asked "When must America go to war?" and she answered, "I think war is a last resort for America. I love that America is so passionate about creating harmony across the entire world; but, war is one of the most devastating, if not the most devastating, thing known to humanity. It should be a last resort after we use diplomacy and communication with other countries."

She won the competition on Saturday, June 13, 2015, when she received her crown from outgoing Miss Missouri titleholder Jessica Hartman. She earned more than $11,000 in scholarship money and other prizes from the state pageant. Garber is the first person to be crowned both Miss Missouri's Outstanding Teen and Miss Missouri. As Miss Missouri, Garber's activities include public appearances across the state of Missouri.

=== Vying for Miss America 2016 ===
She was Missouri's representative at the Miss America 2016 pageant in Atlantic City, New Jersey, in September 2015. In the televised finale on September 13, 2015, she placed outside the Top 15 semi-finalists and was eliminated from competition. She was awarded a $3,000 scholarship prize as her state's representative.

== Early life and education ==
Garber is a native of Hale, Missouri, and a 2012 graduate of Hale High School. Her father is Ron Garber and her mother is Denise Garber.

Garber is a May 2015 graduate Oral Roberts University in Tulsa, Oklahoma, where she studied convergence journalism.

Awards and achievements
Preceded by Jessica Hartman	Miss Missouri; 2015	Succeeded by Erin O'Flaherty
Preceded by Alexandria Black	Miss Missouri's Outstanding Teen; 2011	Succeeded by Shelby Steingraeber
