= Erika Hebron =

American beauty pageant titleholder

- Born: Erika Hebron; August 22, 1986 (age 40); O'Fallon, Missouri, U.S.
- Education: Oklahoma City University
- Beauty pageant titleholder
- Title: Missouri's Junior Miss 2005; Miss Spirit of Saint Louis 2007; Miss Mid Missouri 2009; Miss Gateway St. Louis 2010; Miss Missouri 2010
- Hair color: Auburn
- Major competitions: America's Junior Miss 2005; Miss America 2011

Erika Hebron (born August 22, 1986) is an American beauty pageant titleholder who won the title of Miss Missouri 2010 and competed in Miss America 2011 on January 15, 2011, in Las Vegas, Nevada. She competed at Miss Missouri as Miss Gateway St. Louis. She was a Top 10 finalist in the 2009 pageant and had won the Talent and Evening Gown awards in the 2010 pageant. Her talent is Lyrical Dance and her platform is the Children's Miracle Network. She is a 2009 Oklahoma City University alumni having obtained a Bachelor of Performing Arts in Dance. She also held the title of Missouri's Junior Miss 2005 and competed at nationals with future Miss America Katie Stam.

Preceded by Tara Osseck	Miss Missouri; 2010	Succeeded by Sydney Friar
