= Susan Wilson Solovic =

American entrepreneur and author (born 1958)

- Born: Susan Wilson; 1958 (age 67–68)
- Occupations: author, entrepreneur, journalist, motivational speaker
- Known for: author, blogger, television personality, Miss Missouri
- Spouse: George Solovic(1996-2018)
- Website: SusanSolovic.com

Susan Wilson Solovic (born 1958 as Susan Wilson) is an American entrepreneur and author. Solovic's book "It's Your Biz" became a New York Times, Wall Street Journal, Amazon.com Top 100 and USA Today bestseller. She has also written two best-selling books on women and business and she is a regular contributor on Fox Business and is ABC's Small Business Contributor and was a former contributor to ABC's America This Morning and Money Matters, MSNBC's Your Business and Fox-TV's Good Day New York, as well as other local and national television and radio programs and blogs.

== Career ==
=== Miss Missouri ===
As the winner of the 1979 Miss Missouri pageant, Solovic (as Susan Wilson) represented the state of Missouri in the 1980 Miss America pageant; she placed as the third runner-up.

=== Television ===
Solovic began her professional career as a television news anchor and reporter for NBC, CBS and PBS affiliates. In 1983, she was recruited by Southwestern Bell to create, produce and host a company video magazine. She won numerous awards for her work, including an Emmy Award in 1986. In 1989, Solovic joined ITT Commercial Finance, an international asset-based lending firm headquartered in St. Louis as vice president, director of corporate marketing – the first female executive in the Commercial Finance Division and one of the highest-ranking women at ITT Corporation. While at ITT, she attended St. Louis University School of Law, graduating with honors.

Solovic is the former CEO and a featured host of the web-based Small Business Television (SBTV.com).

=== Current activities ===
In 2004, Solovic was appointed to the National Women's Business Council to advise Congress, the President and the United States Small Business Administration on economic issues relevant to women business owners. She sat on the boards of the John F. Kennedy School of Government (Women's Leadership Board) at Harvard University and the John Cook School of Business Entrepreneurial Studies at St. Louis University. She chairs the advisory board for Women Impacting Public Policy.

== Awards ==
- Enterprising Woman of the Year, Enterprising Women Magazine (2007)
- Influential Women in St. Louis (2004)
- YWCA Special Business Leader Award for Entrepreneurial Success (2004)
- Stevie Award for the Most Innovative Company up to 100 Employees
- Institute for Women Entrepreneurs Leaders of Distinction
- Emmy Award (1986)
- SBA Small Business Journalist of the Year (2009)
- National Association of Women Business Owners, Small Business Journalist (2009)

== Books ==
- Reinvent Your Career: Attain the Success You Desire and Deserve (2003) ISBN 1-56414-682-0
- The Girl’s Guide to Power and Success (2003) ISBN 0-8144-7227-3
- Hanging Onto the American Dream: A story of business leadership and leaving a legacy (2004) ISBN 0-9760915-0-X
- The Girl’s Guide to Building a Million-Dollar Business (2007) ISBN 0-8144-7419-5
- It's Your Biz: The Complete Guide to Becoming Your Own Boss (2011) ISBN 0-8144-1671-3

Preceded by Tamara Fister	Miss Missouri; 1979	Succeeded by Carla LaFevre
