= Mary Tucker Thorp =

American educator (1899–1974)

- Born: Mary Dahood; September 14, 1899; Ottoman Empire
- Died: October 27, 1974 (aged 75); Westerly, Rhode Island
- Other name: Mary T. Thorp
- Occupation: educator
- Years active: 1917–1969
- Known for: developing accreditation standards for early education in Rhode Island

Mary Tucker Thorp (née Dahood) (1899–1974) was a teacher, educator and school principal at the Rhode Island College. She chaired the committee which investigated and made recommendations for accreditation standards for preschool education and which were adopted in the State Board of Education Codes in 1954. She was the first Distinguished Professor of Rhode Island College and both the first residence hall and a Professorship at the school are named in her honor. She was inducted into the Rhode Island Heritage Hall of Fame in 1969.

== Biography ==
Mary Dahood was born on 14 September 1899 in the Ottoman Empire to Hadla Dahood. Her family immigrated to New York in 1904, but soon after, her mother was widowed and placed Mary, her middle child into an orphanage called Rock Nook Home for Children. During her teens, Florence (née Tucker) and Job Thorp, prominent citizens of Westerly, Rhode Island became Dahood's guardians. The Thorps had three other children, Elliott, who would become a Brigadier General and was MacArthur's chief of counter-intelligence during World War II; Walter and a daughter, Elsie. By 1917, Dahood was teaching school in the Tomaquag Valley of Washington County, Rhode Island. Her mother, Hadla, who had been unsuccessful in annulling the Thorp’s guardianship, arrived at the school and tried to take Dahood back to Brooklyn to work at the boardinghouse she operated. Hadla was arrested for attempted kidnapping, but charged with creating a disturbance. After the incident, the Thorps took measures to permanently become Dahood's family. They adopted her around 1920 and she took the name of Mary Tucker Thorp.

== Career ==
In 1926, Thorp accepted a teaching position at Rhode Island College of Education (RIC) and simultaneously worked on her own education, earning her bachelor's degree in education in 1929. She went on to complete a Master of Education from Boston University in 1932, with a thesis entitled Objective Studies Showing Need for Giving Instruction in Use of Geography Tools. Thorp was promoted to president of the Henry Barnard School at RIC in 1936 and the following year, in September 1937, she became a naturalized citizen of the United States. Thorp earned her Doctor of Education in 1943 from Boston University and became the first distinguished professor at RIC. In 1947, Thorp headed a committee to establish accreditation standards for nursery schools and institutions teaching very young children. The report took two years to compile, but became the basis for the code adopted by the State Board of Education for Rhode Island in 1954.

She was a prominent speaker on education, child development and health, speaking at women’s groups, nursing colleges, PTA meetings and various civic organizations. In 1961, the first residence hall on RIC campus was dedicated and named in her honor. Thorp retired from the college in 1962 but continued her community services. In 1963, she served as the vice president of the Rhode Island Tuberculosis and Health Association and the following year became president, a post she held through the end of the 1960s. Thorp also served as a representative to the White House Conference on Children and Youth. She received the Roger Williams Medal from the Greater Providence Chamber of Commerce and a commendation from Brown University for her community service involvement. Thorp was also inducted into the Rhode Island Heritage Hall of Fame in 1969.

Thorp died on 27 October 1974. She bequeathed a trust to the Rhode Island College for the Mary Tucker Thorp College Professorship, which is an annual award honoring teaching or scholarship excellence.

== Selected publications ==
- Thorp, Mary Tucker (1932). Objective Studies Showing Need for Giving Instruction in Use of Geography Tools (M.Ed.). Boston, Massachusetts: Boston University.
- Thorp, Mary Tucker (1943). A program in social-civic education through middle grade history (Ed.D.). Boston, Massachusetts: Boston University. OCLC 893637596.
- Thorp, Mary Tucker Thorp; Wilcox, Edward F (1962). Gladly may you teach: the elementary school project. Providence, Rhode Island: State Department of Education. OCLC 17541735.
- Thorp, Mary Tucker Thorp; Wilcox, Edward F (1963). Two issues: school admission age and promotion policies: the elementary school project. Providence, Rhode Island: State Department of Education. OCLC 17671863.
- Thorp, Mary Tucker Thorp; Wilcox, Edward F (1963). The Rhode Island elementary school principal looks at his role: elementary school project. Providence, Rhode Island: State Department of Education. OCLC 27554700.

== Bibliography ==
- Pezza, Kelly Sullivan (2015). Murder & Mayhem in Washington County, Rhode Island. Charleston, South Carolina: History Press. ISBN 978-1-62585-383-7.
