= Cheryl Prewitt =

American Christian evangelist, author, musician and former beauty pageant titleholder

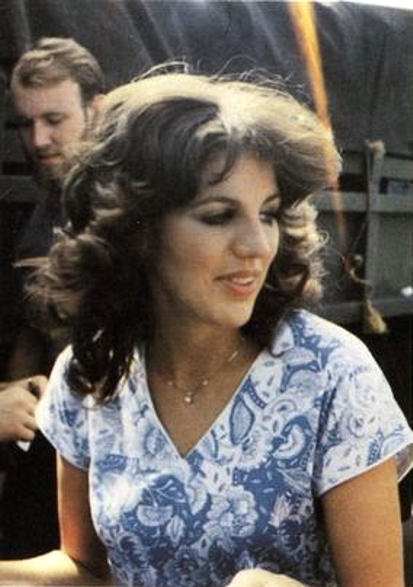
- Prewitt in 1980
- Born: February 15, 1957 (age 69); Ackerman, Mississippi
- Other name: Cheryl Salem
- Education: Mississippi State University
- Occupations: Evangelist, Singer, author, musician
- Title: Miss Starkville 1979; Miss Mississippi 1979; Miss America 1980
- Predecessor: Kylene Barker
- Successor: Susan Powell
- Spouse: Harry Salem (m. 1985)
- Children: 3 (1 deceased)

Cheryl Salem (née Prewitt) (born February 15, 1957) is an American Christian evangelist, author, musician, and former beauty pageant titleholder, who was Miss Mississippi 1979 and Miss America 1980. Cheryl Prewitt has been married to Harry Salem II since 1985, with whom she has three children.

== Early life ==
At age 11, a horrifying automobile accident left Prewitt with a scarred face, a body cast, and in a wheelchair.

== Pageantry ==
Ms. Prewitt entered, and lost, pageants for five years before winning the crown that would take her to Atlantic City for the Miss America pageant. She won the Miss Starkville and Miss Mississippi titles in 1979.

Prewitt became Miss America 1980, despite a history of poverty, sexual abuse, a physical handicap, and a total of 200 facial stitches.

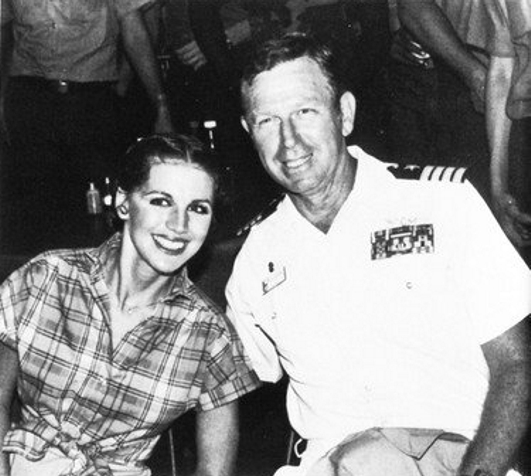
Cheryll Prewitt with Captain Inman Carmichael, U.S. Navy, commanding officer of the aircraft carrier USS Midway (CV-41), in the aft mess decks of the carrier during a dinner on 14 July 1980.

== Personal life ==
She married Harry Salem II, (the brother-in-law of televangelist, Richard Roberts) in 1985. Along with her husband, she ministers through Salem Family Ministries.

The couple have two sons, Harry III and Roman, and had a daughter, Gabrielle, who died at age 6 in 1999 after being diagnosed with an inoperable brain tumor.

== Bibliography ==
- Holy Spirit (2022)
- The Three Stages of Life: Passive Active Authoritative (2021)
- Women of the Nation PRAY! (2018)
- I Am a Worshiper Workbook (2017)
- I Am a Worshiper (2016)
- Tones of the Throne Room Workbook (2016)
- Rebuilding the Ruins of Worship Workbook (2015)
- We Who Worship Workbook (2015)
- Rebuilding the Ruins of Worship Workbook (2015)
- Tones of the Throne Room (2014)
- Rebuilding the Ruins of Worship (2012)
- We Who Worship (2009)
- The Presence of Angels in Your Life (2011)
- Don't Kill Each Other! Let God Do It! (2010)*
- Entering Rest - Be Still - a 40-Day Journey into the Presence of God (2009)
- Obtaining Peace - A 40-Day Prayer Journal (2008)
- 2 Becoming 1 (2006)*
- The Choice is Yours (2005)*
- Overcoming Fear - A 40-Day Prayer Journal (2004)
- Every Body Needs Balance (2004)
- From Grief to Glory (2003)*
- From Mourning to Morning (2001)*
- Distractions from Destiny (2001)*
- Speak the Word Over Your Family for Finances (2003)
- Speak the Word Over Your Family for Healing (2003)
- Speak the Word Over Your Family for Salvation (2003)
- Fight in the Heavenlies
- It's Too Soon to Give Up (1998)
- An Angel's Touch (2000, 1997)
- A Royal Child (1996)
- The Mommy Book (1995)
- How to Get a Balanced Body (1990)
- Simple Facts: Salvation, Healing and the Holy Ghost
- Health and Beauty Secrets
- Choose to be Happy
- Abuse...Bruised but Not Broken (1989)
- You Are Somebody (1988)
- A Bright Shining Place - The Story of a Miracle (1981)

Items with * were written with Dr. Harry Salem II

== Discography ==
- I Want to Live Holy (2023)
- Warriors Follow Me (2022)
- Enter In (2020)
- Communion (2020)
- Divine Romance Instrumental (2020)
- Divine Romance (2020)
- Teach Us How to Pray (2019)
- Righteous Revolution (2018)
- Reveal Yourself to Me (2018)
- Book of Ruth (2018)
- I AM Lullabies (2018)
- I Am a Worshiper (2017)
- Book of Proverbs (2016)
- Heaven on Earth (2012)
- The Holiest Place (2012)
- Prophetic Instrumental (2012)
- Revelation: Scriptures in Song (2012)
- Broken Places (2011)
- Great is Your Grace (2010)
- Deep Cries to Deep (2010)
- Awaken (2010)
- Lord, You're Holy (2008)
- Pour My Love on You (2005)
- The Glory is Here (2004)
- My Head is in Heaven (2002)
- Do I Trust You? (2001)

Awards and achievements
Preceded by Kylene Barker	Miss America; 1980	Succeeded by Susan Powell
Preceded by Cheri Brown	Miss Mississippi; 1979	Succeeded by Sherye Simmons
