= Miss Massachusetts World =

- Formation: 1951
- Type: Beauty pageant
- Headquarters: Wellesley
- Location: Massachusetts
- Members: Miss World America (1951–present)
- Official language: English
- State Director: Miss World America Organization
- Website: Official Website

The Miss Massachusetts World competition is a beauty pageant that selects the representative for Massachusetts in the Miss World America pageant.

The current Miss Massachusetts World is Devon Viola.

== Winners ==
Color key

- Declared as Winner/Ended as Miss World America
- Ended as runner-up
- Ended as one of the finalists or semifinalists
- Ended as special awards winner
- Ended as Miss USA

Year	Name	Hometown	Age (Note: Age at the time of the Miss World America pageant)	Placement at Miss World America	Special awards at Miss World America	Notes
2024	Devon Viola					
2023	Caroline Cooney	Mansfield	24	Top Finalist	Fitness Winner	
2020	Alissa Musto	Rehoboth	24	Top 5	Beauty with a Purpose Winner, Talent Winner	Previously Miss Massachusetts 2016 and Top 15 semi-finalist at Miss America 2017.
2019	Rachel Miller	Dracut	25	3rd Runner-Up		
2018	did not compete					
2017	did not compete					
2016	Maude Gorman	Hingham	22			Previously Miss Massachusetts World 2015 and Top 12 semi-finalist at Miss World America 2015. Also won the Beauty with a Purpose award at Miss World America 2015.
2015	Maude Gorman	Hingham	21	Top 12	Beauty with a Purpose	
Miss Massachusetts United States 2014
2014	Renata De Carvalho			Top 10		
Miss Massachusetts World
2013	No titleholders as Miss World America was designated from 2006 to 2013.					
2012	No titleholders as Miss World America was designated from 2006 to 2013.					
2011	No titleholders as Miss World America was designated from 2006 to 2013.					
2010	No titleholders as Miss World America was designated from 2006 to 2013.					
2009	No titleholders as Miss World America was designated from 2006 to 2013.					
2008	No titleholders as Miss World America was designated from 2006 to 2013.					
2007	No titleholders as Miss World America was designated from 2006 to 2013.					
2006	No titleholders as Miss World America was designated from 2006 to 2013.					
2005	No known representatives from Massachusetts between 2003 and 2005.					
2004	No known representatives from Massachusetts between 2003 and 2005.					
2003	No known representatives from Massachusetts between 2003 and 2005.					
2002	No titleholders as Miss World America was designated from 1995 to 2002.					
2001	No titleholders as Miss World America was designated from 1995 to 2002.					
2000	No titleholders as Miss World America was designated from 1995 to 2002.					
1999	No titleholders as Miss World America was designated from 1995 to 2002.					
1998	No titleholders as Miss World America was designated from 1995 to 2002.					
1997	No titleholders as Miss World America was designated from 1995 to 2002.					
1996	No titleholders as Miss World America was designated from 1995 to 2002.					
1995	No titleholders as Miss World America was designated from 1995 to 2002.					
1994	Michelle Gados					
1993	Maribeth Brown	Holliston	23	Miss World America 1993		Top 10 semi-finalist at Miss World 1993.
1992	Laura Wheeler	Framingham		Top 10		Previously Miss Massachusetts USA 1991 and a contestant at Miss USA 1991.
Miss Massachusetts USA 1981-1991
1991	Laura Wheeler	Framingham				
1990	Laureen Murphy	Boston				
1989	Kimberley Wallace	Ipswich				
1988	Anita Marie Lovely	Franklin				
1987	Rosanna Iversen	Great Barrington				Represented Massachusetts in Miss Oktoberfest 1987, did not place
1986	Sheila Benson	Quincy				
1985	Mercedes Waggoner	Boston	21	Top 10, finishing in 8th place		
1984	Deborah Neary	Onset				
1983	Robin Jeanne Silva	Swansea				
1982	Janet Marie Flaherty	Wilmington	24	Top 12		
1981	JoAnne Savery	East Bridgewater			Best State Costume	
Miss Massachusetts World
1980	Nerine Kidd			2nd Runner-Up		
1979	Diane Maguire					
1978	Debra Sue Maurice	New York City, NY		1st Runner-Up		Later Miss New York USA 1980 and Top 12 semi-finalist at Miss USA 1980.
1977	Cheryl Patricia Hyttinen					
1976	Margaret Worral Stockton					
1975	Mona Jean Tessier	Springfield		3rd Runner-Up		
1974	Kathleen Ellen Walas					
1973	Jeanine Tessier	Ware				
1972	Janice Janes					
1971	Colette C. Nourey	Boston	19		Miss Congeniality	
1970	Deborah Ann Kennedy					
1969	did not compete					
1968	Mary Frances Bigelow					
1967	Cheryl Lee Stankiewicz	Brockton				Competed as Massachusetts. Later Miss Massachusetts USA 1970 and a contestant at Miss USA 1970.
1967	Marie A. Skane	Boston				Competed as Boston, Massachusetts.
1966	Unknown					Competed as Massachusetts.
1966	Peggy Eckert	Boston				Competed as Boston, Massachusetts.
1965	Elaine F. Nash			1st Runner-Up		
1965	Dorothy Ann Fisher	Boston				
1964	Monika Sands					Competed as Massachusetts.
1964	Diane Tibert	Boston				Competed as Boston, Massachusetts.
1963	Marion E. Sarristo			Top 15		Competed as Massachusetts.
1963	Nancy Joan Brackett	Boston; Brighton	17	Top 15		Competed as Boston, Massachusetts. Later Miss Massachusetts USA 1966 and Top 15 semi-finalist at Miss USA 1966.
1962	Mary Marble			Top 15		
1961	Sandra "Su Su" Smith	Newton Upper Falls	21			Later Miss Massachusetts USA 1963 and Top 15 semi-finalist at Miss USA 1963.
1960	Beatrice "Bea" Duprey					
1959	No known representatives from Massachusetts in 1958 & 1959.					
1958	No known representatives from Massachusetts in 1958 & 1959.					
Miss Massachusetts USA 1953-1957
1957	Sandra Ramsey	Haverhill	19	Top 15		
1956	Elaine Murphy	Weston				
1955	Jean Dernago	Springfield				
1954	Nan Cowan	Sterling				
1953	Joan Daly	Somerville				
Miss Massachusetts World
1952	No known representatives from Massachusetts in 1951 & 1952.					
1951	No known representatives from Massachusetts in 1951 & 1952.					

Notes to table
