= Kylene Barker =

American beauty pageant winner

Danice Kylene Barker
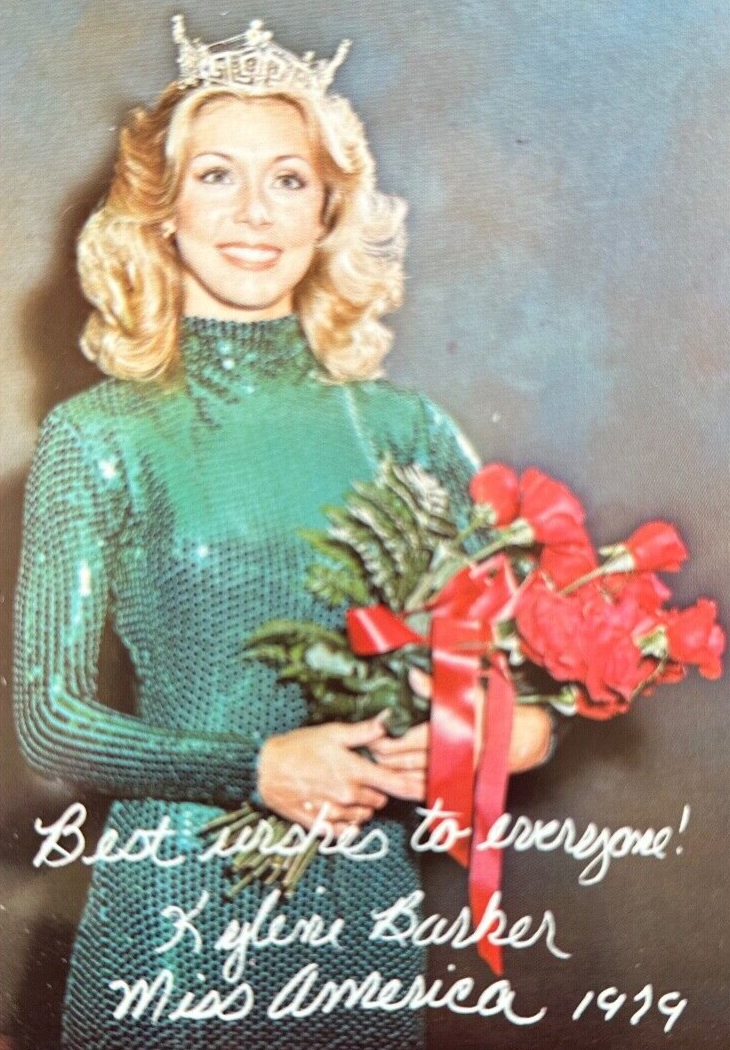
- Barker as Miss America 1979
- Born: 11 November 1955 (age 70); Galax, Virginia, U.S.
- Education: Virginia Tech
- Occupations: Clothing and Textiles
- Title: Miss Pulaski County 1978; Miss Virginia 1978; Miss America 1979
- Predecessor: Susan Perkins
- Successor: Cheryl Prewitt
- Spouses: James Brandon (m. 1979, divorced) Ralph Hibbard (m. 1992; died 2002) Ian McNeill (m. 2007)

Kylene Barker (born 11 November 1955) is an American pageant winner from Galax, Virginia who was Miss Virginia 1978 and Miss America 1979.

== Early life ==
Barker was born in Galax, Virginia to father Kyle and mother Dolores (deceased 2006). She attended Oakland Elementary School, Woodlawn Intermediate School, Carroll County High School and Virginia Polytechnic Institute and State University where she earned a degree in clothing and textiles in 1978.

== Pageants ==
Barker won the Miss Pulaski County pageant, the Miss Virginia pageant in July 1978, and the Miss America 1979 pageant on 9 September 1978. Her talent performance at the Miss America pageant was gymnastics. In 1986 the South Florida Sun-Sentinel reported that Barker received pageant earnings of approximately $100,000.

According to People.com she was also "Most Valuable Cheerleader 1974".

== Career ==
During her year of service as Miss America, Barker signed a lease on a shop at 309 Worth Avenue in Palm Beach, Florida, and opened a dress shop called "D. Kylene" (the "D" stood for Danice). The business (which she operated for thirteen years) closed in 1992.

In 1983, Gemcon Inc. published an audio book produced by Barker called Stamina with Style. On 1 October 1984, Simon & Schuster published a book (Southern Beauty: A Total Fitness and Beauty Program for That Winning, All-American Look) that Barker co-wrote with Sherry Suib Cohen.

Barker has acted as spokesperson for several corporations including: "Clairol, the Manmade Fiber Producer's Association, The Palm Aire Spa, the Made in the USA Council", and the US Sugar Association. She also produced fashion shows for "the American Yarn Spinners Association, the America Textile Manufacturers Association and companies associated with the Crafted with Pride Council".

Barker's television appearances included reports for NBC's Today Show, CNN's Crossfire, and Live with Regis and Kathie Lee. In 1979, she appeared on the Donny and Marie television show (episode #4.3) as herself in the role of Miss America.

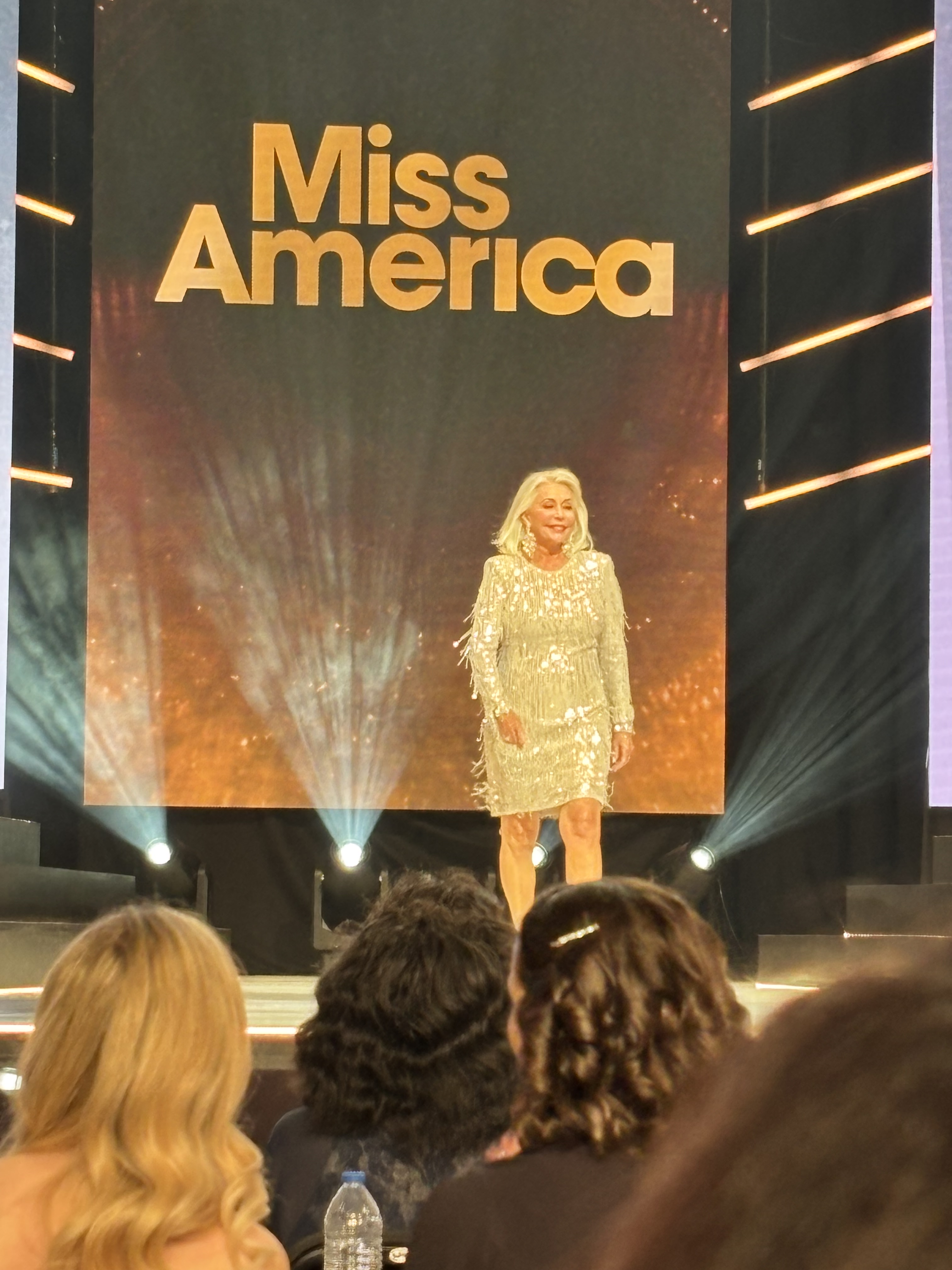
Kylene Barker at the Miss America 2025 competition in Orlando, Florida.

Kylene was appointed to the Virginia Tech Alumni Association Board of Directors.

== Personal life ==
In March 1979, Barker became engaged to James Brandon (a Roanoke businessman). They met in Nassau while he was working on a book titled "Simply Beautiful", and they later married. On 28 August 1986 James Brandon was arrested on charges of "conspiracy, mail and bankruptcy fraud and interstate transportation of stolen property". Barker and Brandon appeared together in court over the affair, and co-signed a $75,000 personal surety bond which ensured Brandon's release from custody.

In the 1990s, Barker moved to Canada with her second husband Ralph Hibbard. He died of cancer in 2002.

In 2007, Barker married Canadian businessman Ian McNeill. They reside in both Muskoka, Ontario and Naples, Florida.

Awards and achievements
Preceded by Susan Perkins	Miss America; 1979	Succeeded by Cheryl Prewitt
Preceded by Terri Bartlett	Miss Virginia; 1978	Succeeded by Paige Brown
