= Miss Massachusetts =

Beauty pageant competition

- Formation: 1922
- Type: Beauty pageant
- Headquarters: Boston
- Location: Massachusetts
- Members: Miss America
- Official language: English
- Website: Official website

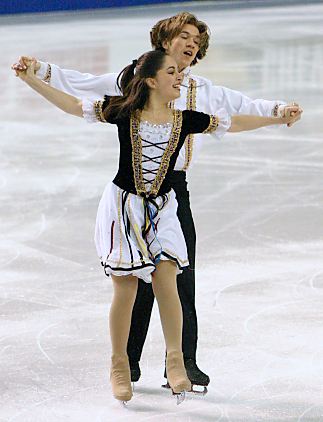
Loren Galler-Rabinowitz, Miss Massachusetts 2010, competes in ice dancing at the 2004 Four Continents Championships

The Miss Massachusetts competition is the scholarship pageant put on annually by the Miss Massachusetts Scholarship Foundation, Inc. The winner of the pageant receives the title of Miss Massachusetts and represents the state of Massachusetts at the Miss America pageant.

Ashlyn Mercier of Oxford was crowned Miss Massachusetts on June 20, 2025, at Hanover Theatre in Worcester, Massachusetts. She competed for the title of Miss America 2027 on September 6, 2026, at the Kravis Center for the Performing Arts in West Palm Beach, Florida.

== Results summary ==
The following is a visual summary of the past results of Miss Massachusetts titleholders at the national Miss America pageants/competitions. The year in parentheses indicates the year of the national competition during which a placement and/or award was garnered, not the year attached to the contestant's state title.

=== Placements ===
- 1st runners-up: Paulina McKevitt* (1944), Catherine Monroe (1969), Abbie Rabine (2002)
- 2nd runners-up: Helena Frances Mack* (1943), Deborah O'Brien (1972), Elizabeth Pierre (2022)
- 3rd runners-up: Polly Connors (1940)
- 4th runners-up: Mary Terasa Hunt (1950), Lauren Kuhn (2015), Gabriela Taveras (2019)
- Top 10: Virginia Maffucci (1956), Jewel Smerage (1957), Brenda Crovo (1961), Carol Kennedy (1967), Georgina Hossfeld (1970), Cynthia Carpenter (1976), Margaret O'Brien (1985), Lisa Desroches (1993), Marcia Turner (1996), Melanie Correia (2003)
- Top 15: Martha E. Hick** (1927), Ethel Beatrice Pierce* (1927), Barbara Laughton (1948), Alissa Musto (2017)
- Top 16: Claire Nevulis* (1937)
- Top 18: Elsie Taylor (1933)

=== Awards ===
==== Preliminary awards ====
- Preliminary Lifestyle and Fitness: Helena Frances Mack* (1943), Abbie Rabine (2002)
- Preliminary On Stage Interview: Gabriela Taveras (2019)
- Preliminary Talent: Claire Nevulis (1937), Helena Frances Mack* (1943), Virginia Maffucci (1956), Cynthia Carpenter (1976), Margaret O'Brien (1985), Erika Ebbel (2005), Valerie Amaral (2008)
- Preliminary Interview: Abbie Rabine (2002)

==== Non-finalist awards ====
- Non-finalist Talent: Sharon Faught (1960), Maria Lynn Chaffee (1968), Marie Semas (1973), Rena Walmsley (1974), Amy Linder (1981), Holly Mayer (1984), Lisa Kleypas (1986), Aurelie McCarthy (1988), Marissa Laakso (1991), Melissa Bloemker (1992), Sharon Lee (1995), Lori Flick (1997), April Thibeaut (2000), Erika Ebbel (2005), Valerie Amaral (2008), Taylor Kinzler (2012)
- Non-finalist Interview: Elizabeth Hancock (1999)

==== Other awards ====
- Miss Congeniality: N/A
- Dr. David B. Allman Medical Scholarship: Susan Sadlier (1975)
- Charles & Theresa Brown Scholarship: Lauren Kuhn (2015), Alissa Musto (2017)
- Children's Miracle Network (CMN) Miracle Maker Award Winner: Valerie Amaral (2008), Loren Galler-Rabinowitz (2011)
- CMN Miracle Maker Award 2nd runners-up: Jillian Zucco (2018)
- People's Choice Award: Gabriela Taveras (2019)
- Quality of Life Award Finalists: Valerie Amaral (2008)
- STEM Scholarship Award Winners: Lauren Kuhn (2015), Jillian Zucco (2018), Gabriela Taveras (2019)
- STEM Scholarship Award 1st runners-up: Lyndsey Littlefield (2020)
- Waterford Crystal Award for Business Marketing and Management: Samira Zebian (1998)

* Competed as Miss Boston
** Competed as Miss Pittsfield

== Winners ==
- Declared as winner
- Ended as a runner-up
- Ended as a finalist or semi-finalist

Year	Name	Hometown	Age	Local Title	Miss America Talent	Placement at Miss America	Special scholarships at Miss America	Notes
2026	Ashlyn Mercier	Oxford	25	Miss Bay State	Contemporary Dance			
2025	Khailah Griffin	Cambridge	26	Miss Cambridge	Piano			
2024	Kiersten Khoury	Westwood	23	Miss Bay State	HERStory, "Fight Song"			
2023	Chelsea Vuong	Cambridge	25	Miss North Shore	Piano			First Asian-American woman to win Miss Massachusetts
2022	Katrina Kincade	Boston	25	Miss Cambridge	Vocal			
2021	Elizabeth Pierre	North Cambridge	23	Miss Cambridge	Contemporary Dance	2nd runner-up		
2019–20	Lyndsey Littlefield	East Taunton	22	Miss Taunton	Lyrical Dance		STEM Scholarship Award 1st runner-up	Longest reigning Miss Massachusetts at 2 years and 18 days (749 days), second longest reigning Miss America state titleholder
2018	Gabriela Taveras	Lawrence	23	Miss North Shore	Vocal, "Rise Up"	4th runner-up	People's Choice Award Preliminary On Stage Interview Award STEM Scholarship Award	First African American woman to win Miss Massachusetts title
2017	Jillian Zucco	Mattapoisett	24	Miss Bristol County	Vocal, "The Impossible Dream"		CMN Miracle Maker Award 2nd runner-up STEM Scholarship Award	Top 10 finalist at National Sweetheart 2015 pageant
2016	Alissa Musto	Rehoboth	21	Miss Cambridge	Piano	Top 15	Charles & Theresa Brown Scholarship	Later Miss Massachusetts World 2020
2015	Meagan Fuller	Attleboro	22	Miss Collegiate Area	Jazz Dance, "Feeling Good"			Top 10 at America's Distinguished Young Women 2010 pageant 1st runner-up at National Sweetheart 2013 pageant
2014	Lauren Kuhn	Boston	23	Miss Collegiate Area	Piano, "Valse Dramatico" by Melody Bober	4th runner-up	Charles & Theresa Brown Scholarship STEM Scholarship Award	
2013	Amanda Narciso	Taunton	22	Miss Cranberry Country	Tap Dance, "Can't Hold Us"			2nd runner-up at National Sweetheart 2011 pageant
2012	Taylor Kinzler	Lakeville	20	Miss Norfolk County	Vocal, "At Last"		Non-finalist Talent Award	Previously Miss Massachusetts' Outstanding Teen 2008 Contestant at National Sweetheart 2010 pageant
2011	Molly Whalen	Middleboro	21	Miss Taunton	Vocal, "I Just Call You Mine"			
2010	Loren Galler-Rabinowitz	Brookline	24	Miss Collegiate Area	Piano, "The Swan"		CMN Miracle Maker Award	U.S. Ice Dancing Bronze Medalist
2009	Amanda Kelly	Braintree	23	Miss Fall River	Vocal, "Show Off" from The Drowsy Chaperone			Sister of Miss Massachusetts USA 2006, Tiffany Kelly Contestant at National Sweetheart 2008 pageant
2008	Alicia Zitka	West Springfield	22	Miss Hampden County	Lyrical Dance, "I Will Love You" by Fisher			
2007	Valerie Amaral	Acushnet	22	Miss North Shore	Vocal, "Anyway"		CMN Miracle Maker Award Non-finalist Talent Award Preliminary Talent Award Quality of Life Award Finalist	Previously Miss Massachusetts' Outstanding Teen 2001 Contestant at National Sweetheart 2006 pageant
2006	Michaela Gagne	Fall River	24	Miss Southcoast	Vocal, "Bye Bye Blackbird"			Contestant at National Sweetheart 2005 pageant
2005	Kristin Gauvin	Worcester	23	Miss Apponagansett Bay	Tap Dance, "Christmas Eve in Sarajevo"			Top 10 at National Sweetheart 2004 pageant Later New England Patriots Cheerleader
2004	Erika Ebbel	Cambridge	23	Miss Apponagansett Bay	Classical Piano, "Fantaisie-Impromptu"		Non-finalist Talent Award Preliminary Talent Award	2nd runner-up at National Sweetheart 2003 pageant
2003	Melissa Silva	Fall River	23	Miss Southern Massachusetts	Vocal, "Who Will Love Me As I Am?" from Side Show			Contestant at National Sweetheart 2002 pageant
2002	Melanie Correia	Acushnet	22	Miss Taunton	Vocal, "Big Time"	Top 10		2nd runner-up at National Sweetheart 2001 pageant
2001	Abbie Rabine	Wenham	22	Miss Southern Massachusetts/Freetown	Vocal, "Via Dolorosa"	1st runner-up	Preliminary Interview Award Preliminary Swimsuit Award	Contestant at National Sweetheart 1999 pageant
2000	Michelle Neves	New Bedford	23	Miss Pioneer Valley	Vocal, "I'm Afraid This Must Be Love"			Previously Miss Massachusetts Teen USA 1994
1999	April Thibeault	Boston	21	Miss North Shore	Ballet, "Reflections of Passion"		Non-finalist Talent Award	
1998	Elizabeth Hancock	Cambridge	20	Miss Suffolk County	Musical Theater Monologue from 42nd Street		Non-finalist Interview Award	
1997	Samira Zebian	Westfield	20	Miss Tri-Counties/North Shore	Irish Step Dance		Waterford Crystal Award for Business Marketing & Management	
1996	Lori Flick	Boston	24	Miss Tri-Counties/North Shore	Interpretive Gymnastics Dance, "Prologue from Beauty and the Beast"		Non-finalist Talent Award	
1995	Marcia Turner	Cambridge	21	Miss Tri-Counties/North Shore	Piano, "Souvenirs d'Andalousie, Op.22" by Louis Moreau Gottschalk	Top 10		
1994	Sharon Lee	Somerville	24	Miss Tri-Counties/North Shore	Classical Vocal, "O Mio Babbino Caro"		Non-finalist Talent Award	
1993	Ellen Fitzgerald	Saugus	22	Miss Bay State	Vocal, "Vision of Love"			
1992	Lisa Desroches	New Bedford	21	Miss New Bedford	Character Ballet en Pointe, "Can-Can"	Top 10		
1991	Melissa Bloemker	East Boston	20	Miss Greater Boston	Harp, "Tango & Rumba from Suite of Eight Dances" by Carlos Salzedo		Non-finalist Talent Award	
1990	Marissa Laakso	Randolph	24	Miss Bay State	Character Tap Dance, "Mr. Bojangles"		Non-finalist Talent Award	
1989	Janette Elman	Attleboro	22	Miss Greater Attleboro	Russian Cossack Dance			
1988	Diana Steckler	East Boston	22	Miss East Boston	Vocal, "Amazing Grace"			
1987	Aurelie McCarthy	East Boston	24	Miss East Boston	Marimba, "Hava Nagila", "William Tell Overture", & "Joplin on Wood"		Non-finalist Talent Award	Former executive director of the Miss Massachusetts pageant
1986	Kathleen Callahan	Revere	23	Miss Boston	Popular Vocal, "Come Rain or Come Shine"			
1985	Lisa Kleypas	Carlisle	20	Miss Tri-County	Original Vocal Composition & Guitar, "Love You Are My Wings"		Non-finalist Talent Award	
1984	Margaret O'Brien	Weymouth	26	Miss Cape Cod	Vocal Medley, "The Man that Got Away", "The Man I Love", & "My Man"	Top 10	Preliminary Talent Award	Previously National Sweetheart 1983
1983	Holly Mayer	Brookline	26	Miss Merrimack Valley	Dance / Baton Twirling, Music from Gypsy: A Musical Fable		Non-finalist Talent Award	Previously National Sweetheart 1982 Mother of Miss New York's Outstanding Teen 2011 and Miss New York 2019, Lauren Molella Sister-in-law of Miss New York 1989, Lisa Molella
1982	Lisa Scorgie	North Attleboro	23	Miss Attleboro	Violin, "Fantasy of Russian Folk Songs"			
1981	Deborah Salois	North Andover	19	Miss Methuen	Vocal, "Keepin' Out of Mischief Now" from Ain't Misbehavin'			
1980	Amy Linder	Lowell	22	Miss Methuen	Piano, Sonata by Alberto Ginastera		Non-finalist Talent Award	
1979	Lisa Matta	Brockton	20	Miss Boston	Jazz Dance, "Slow Dancing"			
1978	Rowena Humphrey	Worthington	20	Miss Northern Berkshire	Ballet en Pointe, "(Where Do I Begin?) Love Story"			
1977	Janice Ould	Boston	25	Miss Methuen	Semi-classical Vocal, "One Kiss" from The New Moon			
1976	Deborah Guastella	Methuen	22	Miss Merrimack Valley	Vocal, "Your World And Mine"			
1975	Cynthia Carpenter	Wayland	22	Miss Marlboro	Classical Piano, "Malagueña"	Top 10	Preliminary Talent Award	
1974	Susan Sadlier	Lowell	22	Miss Newburyport/Coast Guard	Musical Comedy, "I'm the Greatest Star"		Dr. David B. Allman Medical Scholarship	
1973	Rena Walmsley	North Attleboro	20	Miss Attleboro	Dramatic Soliloquy from Funny Girl		Non-finalist Talent Award	
1972	Marie Semas	Taunton	18	Miss Taunton	Piano & Vocal Original Composition		Non-finalist Talent Award	
1971	Deborah O'Brien	Foxboro	22	Miss Foxboro	Classical Vocal, "Je Veux Vivre" from Roméo et Juliette	2nd runner-up		
1970	Diana Dohrmann	Boston	21		Piano, "The Kid From Red Bank" by Count Basie			
1969	Georgina Hossfeld	Burlington	22	Miss Burlington	Piano, "Piano Concerto in A minor" by Edvard Grieg & "Bumble Boogie"	Top 10		
1968	Catherine Monroe	Lynnfield	20	Miss Woburn	Sign Language & Dance, "What the World Needs Now Is Love"	1st runner-up		
1967	Maria Lynn Chaffee	Waltham	18	Miss Woburn	Ballet & Jazz Toe Dance, "Do I Hear a Waltz?", "Georgy Girl", & "One of Those Songs"		Non-finalist Talent Award	
1966	Carol Kennedy	Worcester	19	Miss Northboro	Jazz Ballet Dance, "Can-Can"	Top 10		
1965	Mabel Bendiksen	New Bedford	18	Miss New Bedford	Dramatic Reading & Folk Singing, "The Hazards of Nuclear Fallout" & "What Have They Done to the Rain"			
1964	Kathleen Kenneally	Whitman	21	Miss Brockton	Dramatic Reading			
1963	Lila Saldani	Attleboro		Miss Attleboro	Original Dramatic Monologue, "A World of Darkness"			
1962	Karen Behn	North Dartmouth	18	Miss New Bedford	Dramatic Reading			
1961	Nona Smith	Fairhaven	18	Miss New Bedford	Dramatic Reading			
1960	Brenda Crovo	Reading	20	Miss Cambridge	Vocal Medley, "Bill" & "Can't Help Lovin' Dat Man" from Show Boat	Top 10		
1959	Sharon Faught	Holyoke	21		Dramatic Reading & Vocal		Non-finalist Talent Award	
1958	Patricia Nordling	Lexington			Vocal / Piano, "Exactly Like You"			
1957	Daly Hirsch	Boston			Drama			
1956	Jewel Smerage	Boston			Vocal Medley from The King and I	Top 10		Featured in Atul Gawande's #1 New York Times bestselling book, Being Mortal
1955	Virginia Maffucci	Watertown			Dramatic Monologue, "Solitary Confinement"	Top 10	Preliminary Talent Award	
1954	Judith Drake	Fairhaven						
1953	Lois Feldman	Natick			Ballet			
1952	Barbara Graves	Milton						
1951	Mildred Almeida	New Bedford			Fashion Modeling			
1950	Britta Berg	Boston		Miss Massachusetts				
1950	Mary Teresa Hunt	Lynn		Miss Essex County-1949	Dramatic Reading	4th runner-up		
Miss America 1949	Gloria Curelli	Roslindale			Dance			
1948	Barbara McGrath	Boston		Miss Boston				Multiple Massachusetts representatives Contestants competed under local title at Miss America pageant
1948	Barbara Laughton	Reading		Miss Massachusetts	Vocal, "The Moon Belongs to Everyone"	Top 15		Multiple Massachusetts representatives Contestants competed under local title at Miss America pageant
1947	No Massachusetts representative at Miss America pageant							
1946	Paula C. Jerome	Boston		Miss Boston				Multiple Massachusetts representatives Contestants competed under local title at Miss America pageant
1946	Urania "Rae" Nichols	Malden		Miss Massachusetts				Multiple Massachusetts representatives Contestants competed under local title at Miss America pageant
1945	Claire Thibadeau	Boston		Miss Boston				Multiple Massachusetts representatives Contestants competed under local title at Miss America pageant
1945	Ruth Thomas	Belmont		Miss Massachusetts				Multiple Massachusetts representatives Contestants competed under local title at Miss America pageant
1944	Paulina McKevitt	Boston		Miss Boston	Vocal, "Goodnight, Wherever You Are"	1st runner-up		Multiple Massachusetts representatives Contestants competed under local title at Miss America pageant
1944	Lucille Descoteau	Lowell		Miss Massachusetts				Multiple Massachusetts representatives Contestants competed under local title at Miss America pageant
1943	Helena Frances Mack	Boston		Miss Boston	Samba Dance, "Cae Cae"	2nd runner-up	Preliminary Swimsuit Award Preliminary Talent Award	Multiple Massachusetts representatives Contestants competed under local title at Miss America pageant
1943	Mary McAnulty	Roslindale		Miss Massachusetts				Multiple Massachusetts representatives Contestants competed under local title at Miss America pageant
1942	Paula Boardman	Natick						
1941	Betsy Sears Taylor	Cambridge						
1940	Polly Connors	Bedford				3rd runner-up		Mother of Miss Massachusetts USA 1967 Pamela Procter
1939	No Massachusetts representative at Miss America pageant							
1938	No Massachusetts representative at Miss America pageant							
1937	Claire Nevulis	South Boston			Vocal / Tap Dance	Top 16	Preliminary Talent Award	
1936	Marion Flynn	Norwood	18	Miss Long Beach				
1935	Rita Mae King	Leominster		Miss Leominster				Multiple Massachusetts representatives Contestants competed under local title at Miss America pageant
1935	Mary Stanley	Quincy		Miss Quincy				Multiple Massachusetts representatives Contestants competed under local title at Miss America pageant
1934	No national pageant was held							
1933	Elsie Taylor		17		N/A	Top 18		
1932	No national pageants were held							
1931	No national pageants were held							
1930	No national pageants were held							
1929	No national pageants were held							
1928	No national pageants were held							
1927	Ethel Beatrice Pierce			Miss Boston	N/A	Top 15		Multiple Massachusetts representatives Contestants competed under local title at Miss America pageant
1927	Muriel E. Bowers			Miss Lynn	N/A			Multiple Massachusetts representatives Contestants competed under local title at Miss America pageant
1927	Marion Howarth	Fall River		Miss New England	N/A			Multiple Massachusetts representatives Contestants competed under local title at Miss America pageant
1927	Martha E. Hick			Miss Pittsfield	N/A	Top 15		Multiple Massachusetts representatives Contestants competed under local title at Miss America pageant
1927	Dorothy M. Rawson			Miss Worcester	N/A			Multiple Massachusetts representatives Contestants competed under local title at Miss America pageant
1926	Mary "May" Mudge			Miss Boston	N/A			Multiple Massachusetts representatives Contestants competed under local title at Miss America pageant
1926	Mary Robinson			Miss Lockport	N/A			Multiple Massachusetts representatives Contestants competed under local title at Miss America pageant
1926	Rosa Lee Irving			Miss Portsmouth	N/A			Multiple Massachusetts representatives Contestants competed under local title at Miss America pageant
1926	Muriel Borek			Miss Springfield	N/A			Multiple Massachusetts representatives Contestants competed under local title at Miss America pageant
1925	Nina Wolff			Miss Boston	N/A			Multiple Massachusetts representatives Contestants competed under local title at Miss America pageant
1925	Katherine Kearns	Newton		Miss New England	N/A			Multiple Massachusetts representatives Contestants competed under local title at Miss America pageant
1924	Mildred M. Prendergast	Boston		Miss Boston	N/A			After winning Miss Boston title, pageant officials banned Prendergast from competing in national pageant as she was married and had a nine-month old son Prendergast and her husband threatened legal action citing that officials knew she was married prior to competing in Miss Boston pageant After their protest, officials relented and allowed Prendergast to compete
1923	Margaret Black	Boston		Miss Boston	N/A			Multiple Massachusetts representatives Contestants competed under local title at Miss America pageant
1923	Doris Rowden George	Cambridge		Miss Cambridge	N/A			Multiple Massachusetts representatives Contestants competed under local title at Miss America pageant
1923	Mildred Salisbury	New Bedford		Miss New Bedford	N/A			Multiple Massachusetts representatives Contestants competed under local title at Miss America pageant
1922	Charlotte Trowbridge	Boston		Miss Boston	N/A			Multiple Massachusetts representatives Contestants competed under local title at Miss America pageant
1922	Helen Lynch	Fall River		Miss Fall River	N/A			Multiple Massachusetts representatives Contestants competed under local title at Miss America pageant
1922	Alice Burke	New Bedford		Miss New Bedford	N/A			Multiple Massachusetts representatives Contestants competed under local title at Miss America pageant
1921	No Massachusetts representative at Miss America pageant							
