= Hale, Missouri =

- City
- Location of Hale, Missouri
- Coordinates: 39°36′18″N 93°20′36″W
- Country: United States
- State: Missouri
- County: Carroll

Area
  - Total: 0.55 sq mi (1.42 km^{2})
  - Land: 0.55 sq mi (1.42 km^{2})
  - Water: 0 sq mi (0.00 km^{2})
- Elevation: 778 ft (237 m)

Population (2020)
  - Total: 375
  - Density: 682.9/sq mi (263.65/km^{2})
- Time zone: UTC-6 (Central (CST))
  - Summer (DST): UTC-5 (CDT)
- ZIP code: 64643
- Area code: 660
- FIPS code: 29-29908
- GNIS feature ID: 2394268

Hale is a city in Carroll County, Missouri, United States. The population was 375 at the 2020 census.

== History ==
Hale was platted in 1833. The community was named after John P. Hale, a state legislator.

== Geography ==
According to the United States Census Bureau, the city has a total area of 0.55 square miles (1.42 km^{2}), all land.

== Demographics ==
Historical population
Census	Pop.	Note	%±
1890	530		—
1900	665		25.5%
1910	587		−11.7%
1920	690		17.5%
1930	574		−16.8%
1940	562		−2.1%
1950	452		−19.6%
1960	504		11.5%
1970	461		−8.5%
1980	529		14.8%
1990	480		−9.3%
2000	473		−1.5%
2010	419		−11.4%
2020	375		−10.5%
U.S. Decennial Census

As of 2000 the median income for a household in the city was $24,625, and the median income for a family was $45,250. Males had a median income of $33,214 versus $23,036 for females. The per capita income for the city was $17,790. About 9.5% of families and 15.6% of the population were below the poverty line.

=== 2010 census ===
As of the census of 2010, there were 419 people, 176 households, and 112 families residing in the city. The population density was 698 people per square mile). There were 209 housing units at an average density of 348 per square mile. The racial makeup of the city was 97.1% White, and 2.4% from two or more races. American Indian or Alaskan Native of any race were .5% of the population.

There were 176 households, of which 30.7% had children under the age of 18 living with them, 44.9% were married couples living together, 8.5% were male householders with no wife present, 10.2% were female householders with no husband present, and 36.4% were non-families. 35.2% of all households were made up of individuals, and 34.7% had someone living alone who was 65 years of age or older. The average household size was 2.38 and the average family size was 3.01.

In the city the population was spread out, with 24.7% under the age of 18, 3.6% from 19 to 24, 24.9% from 25 to 44, 23.6% from 45 to 64, and 18.4% who were 65 years of age or older. The median age was 38.5 years.

== Education ==
The Hale R-I School District provides preschool through 12th grade education for all of Hale as well as surrounding areas that include portions of Carroll and Livingston Counties.
