= Savannah Lane =

American beauty pageant contestant (born 1995)

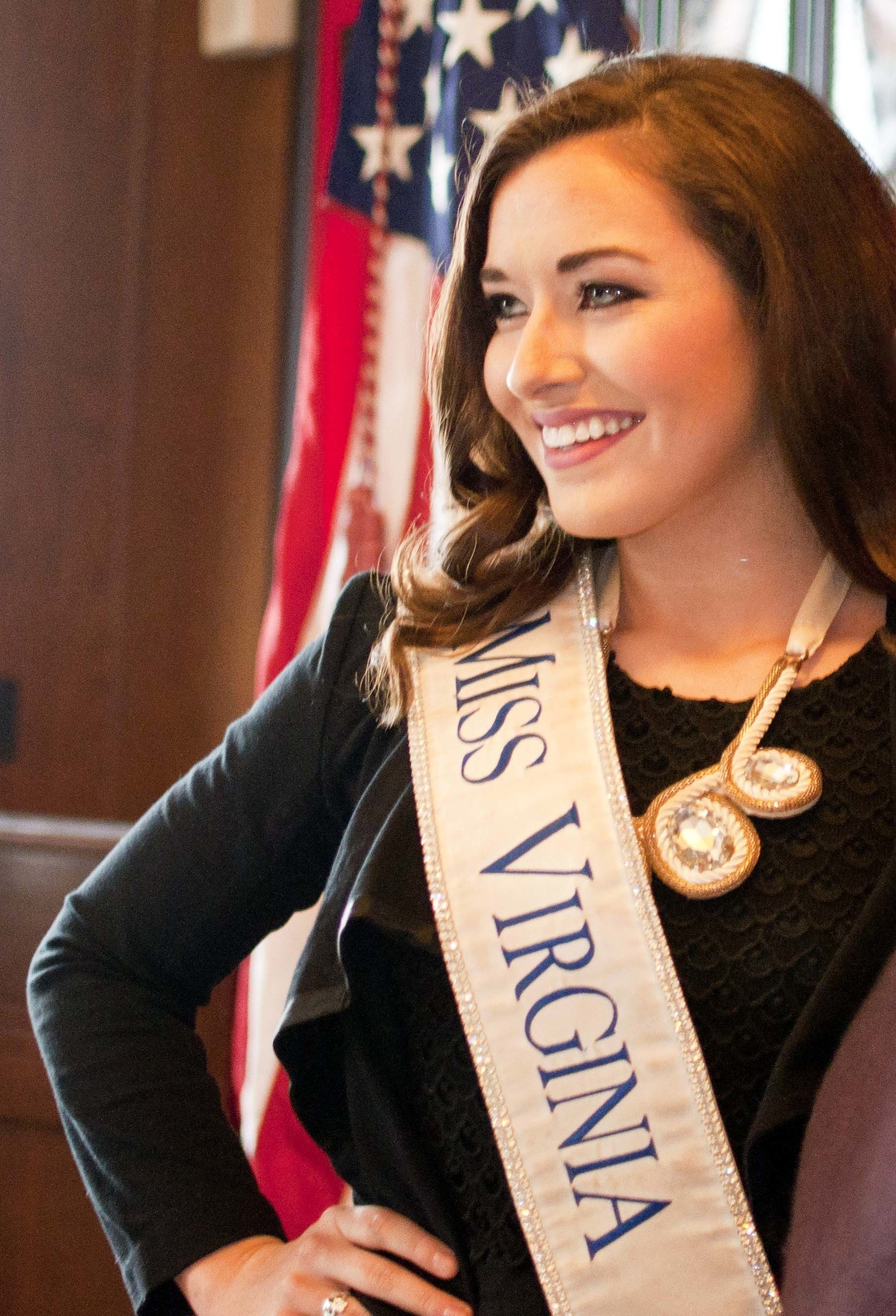
- Lane at Marine Corps Base Quantico in 2015
- Born: Savannah Morgan Lane; April 3, 1995 (age 31)
- Education: University of Virginia
- Beauty pageant titleholder
- Title: Miss Chesterfield's Outstanding Teen 2011; Miss Chesterfield County Fair Queen 2012; Miss Northern Virginia 2013; Miss Chesterfield 2014; Miss Piedmont Region 2015; Miss Virginia 2015
- Major competition: Miss America 2016

Savannah Morgan Lane (born April 3, 1995) is an American beauty pageant titleholder from Midlothian, Virginia, who was crowned Miss Virginia 2015. She competed for the Miss America 2016 title in September 2015 and placed in the top 15.

== Pageant career ==
=== Early pageants ===
On January 8, 2011, Lane won the title Miss Chesterfield's Outstanding Teen 2011. In August 2011, she vied for title of Miss Virginia's Outstanding Teen, part of the Miss America pageant system for young women between 13 and 17 years old. Lane was named first runner-up to Dominick Fink for the state teen title.

Outside of the Miss America system, Lane won the title Miss Chesterfield County Fair Queen in August 2012. She contended for the state title of 2013 Miss Virginia Association of Fairs but was named first runner-up to Sarah Grace.

=== Vying for Miss Virginia ===
Returning to the Miss America system as an adult, Lane won the Miss Northern Virginia 2013 title on February 17, 2013. She competed in the 2013 Miss Virginia pageant with the platform "The Power of Performance" and a vocal performance in the talent portion of the competition. She was named was fourth runner-up to winner Desiree Williams.

In November 2013, Lane won the Miss Chesterfield 2014 title. She competed in the 2014 Miss Virginia pageant with the platform "The Power of Performance" and a vocal performance of "Defying Gravity" from the musical Wicked in the talent portion of the competition. She was named first runner-up to winner Courtney Garrett and won $8,350 in scholarship money.

=== Miss Virginia 2015 ===
On January 17, 2015, Lane was crowned Miss Piedmont Region 2015. She entered the Miss Virginia pageant at Roanoke's Berglund Center in late June 2015 as one of 27 qualifiers for the state title. Lane's competition talent was a vocal performance of "Don't Rain on My Parade" from the musical Funny Girl. Her platform was "The Power of Performance."

Lane won the competition on June 27, 2015, when she received her crown from outgoing titleholder Courtney Garrett, Miss Virginia 2014. Lane earned more than $20,000 in scholarship money and other prizes from the state pageant. As Miss Virginia, her activities included public appearances across the state of Virginia.

=== Vying for Miss America 2016 ===
Lane was Virginia's representative at the Miss America 2016 pageant in Atlantic City, New Jersey, in September 2015. In the televised finale on September 13, 2015, she placed in the top 15 as a semi-finalist but was eliminated after the swimsuit competition. Lane was awarded a $4,000 scholarship prize.

== Personal life and education ==
Lane's parents are Dennis and Brigid Lane. Lane is one of five siblings, including a younger brother, twin older sisters, and her own twin sister, Hailey. (Hailey became the focus of the international #WeAreHaileyStrong hashtag campaign after suffering a heart attack in March 2015.) Lane's pageant bio states that she is "distantly related" to Elvis Presley.

She is a 2013 graduate of Midlothian High School. She was a student at the University of Virginia where she studied foreign affairs.

Awards and achievements
| Preceded by Courtney Garrett | Miss Virginia; 2015 | Succeeded by Michaela Gabriella Sigmon |
