= Camille Schrier =

American beauty pageant contestant

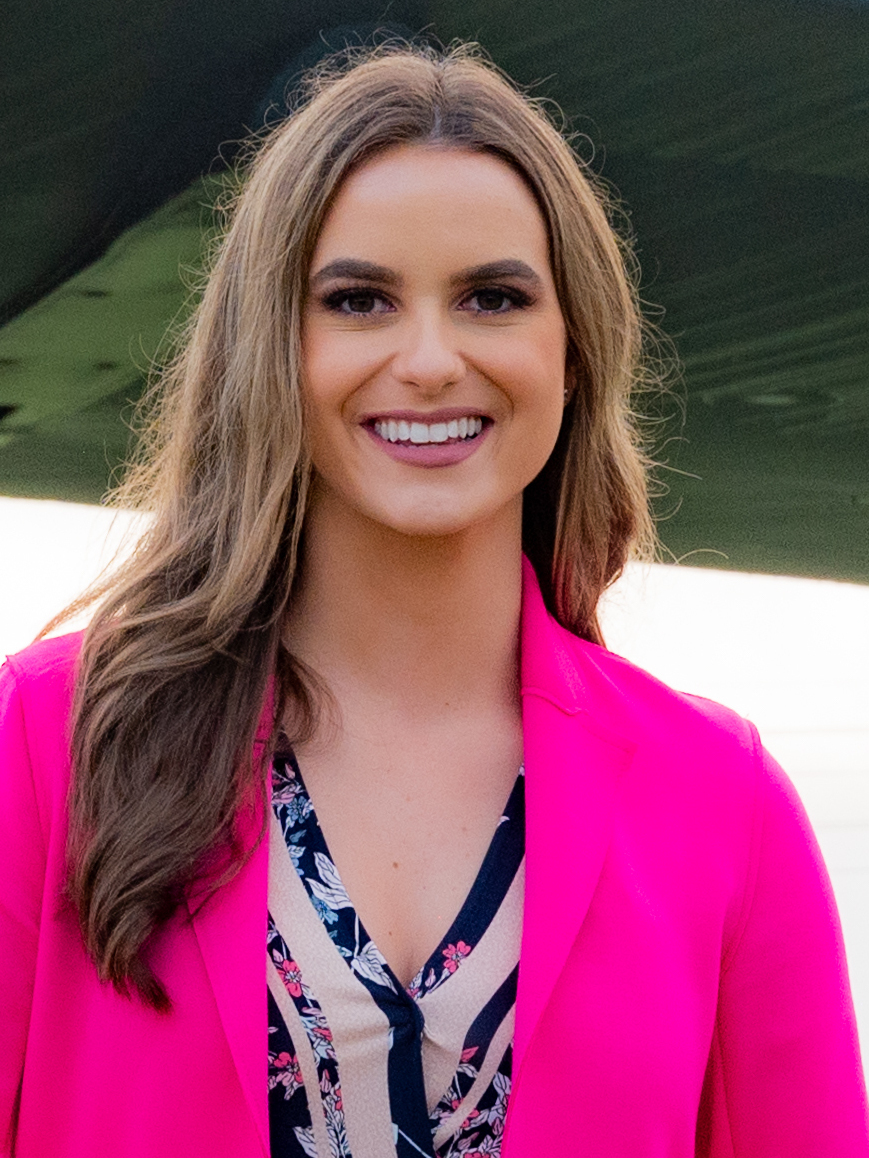
- Schrier in 2021
- Born: Camille Thomasina Schrier; June 30, 1995 (age 30); Doylestown, Pennsylvania, U.S.
- Education: Hun School of Princeton; University of Michigan; Virginia Tech; VCU School of Pharmacy
- Title: National American Miss (NAM) Pennsylvania Teen 2012; Miss Dominion 2019; Miss Virginia 2019; Miss America 2020
- Term: December 19, 2019 – December 16, 2021
- Predecessor: Nia Franklin
- Successor: Emma Broyles

Camille Thomasina Schrier (/ˈʃraɪər/; born June 30, 1995) is an American pageant titleholder. On June 22, 2019, she was crowned Miss Virginia 2019. On December 19, 2019, she was crowned Miss America 2020 in Uncasville, Connecticut.

In May 2020, following the cancellation of the Miss America 2021 competition due to the COVID-19 pandemic, the Miss America organization announced that Schrier would serve an additional year after her term as Miss America was due to expire in December 2020.

== Early life and education ==
Schrier was born in Doylestown, Pennsylvania, to Cheryl (née Camillo) and Thomas Schrier. She has one older sibling. As a child, Schrier was diagnosed with Ehlers–Danlos Syndrome. During the Miss America 2020 competition, Schrier also revealed that she was diagnosed with obsessive–compulsive disorder (OCD) and recovered from an eating disorder as a teenager.

Schrier graduated with honors from the Hun School of Princeton in 2013. During high school, Schrier was a multi-sport varsity athlete; participating in track and field, swimming, and field hockey. Schrier briefly attended University of Michigan before transferring to Virginia Tech her junior year and graduating cum laude in 2018 with dual bachelor of science degrees, one in biochemistry and one in systems biology and a minor in chemistry. At Virginia Tech, she was in Kappa Delta sorority. She was accepted to VCU School of Pharmacy and had completed her first year of doctoral program before winning the Miss Virginia title.

In 2024, Schrier graduated from VCU School of Pharmacy with a Doctor of Pharmacy degree.

== Pageantry ==
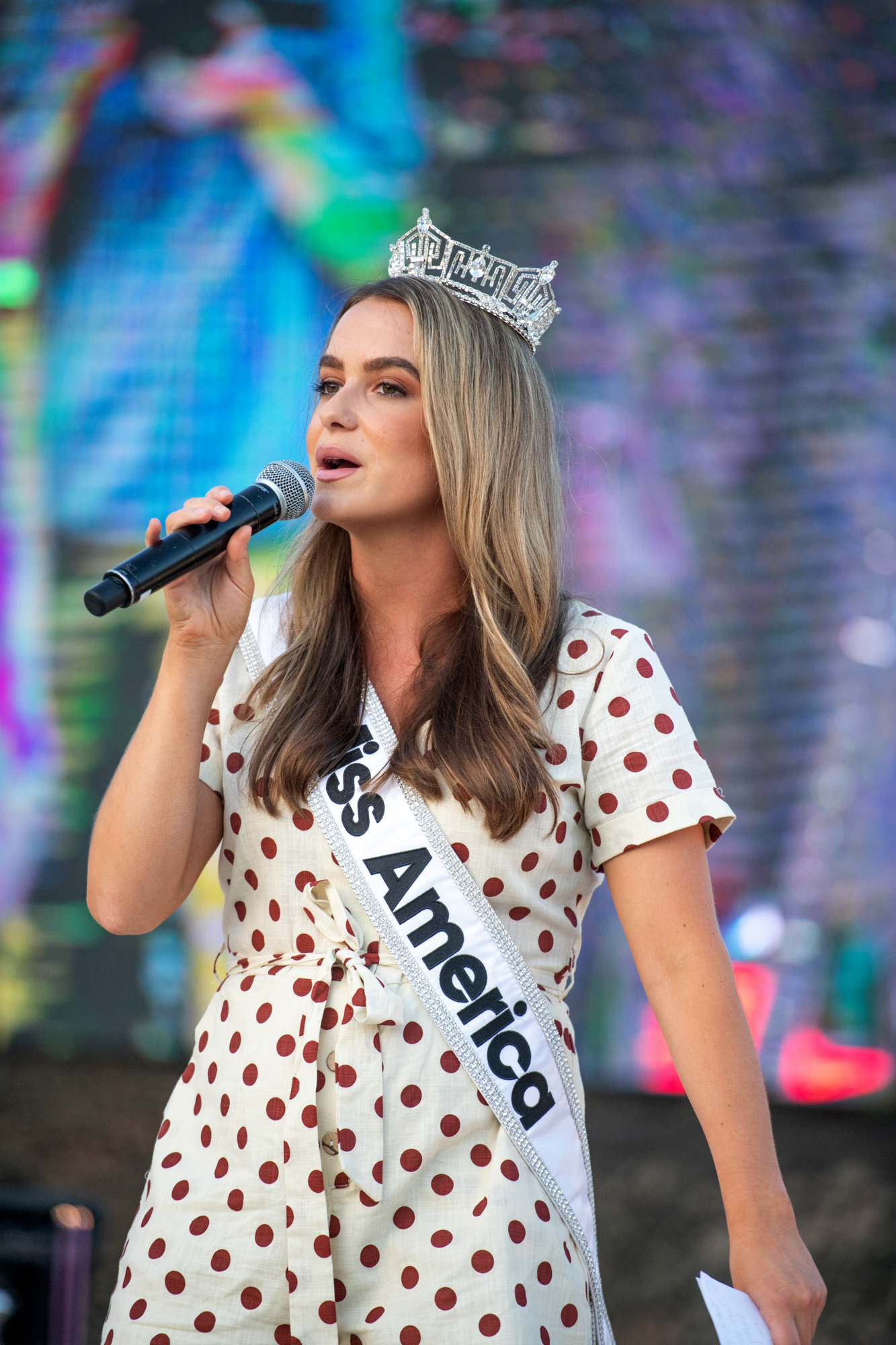
Schrier performs on stage during the USO Summer Tour, July 1, 2021, at Joint Base San Antonio-Lackland, Texas

=== Early pageantry ===
Schrier began competing in pageants at the age of 14. She previously earned title of National American Miss (NAM) Pennsylvania Teen 2012 and was named the first runner-up in 2012 national competition.

=== Miss Virginia 2019 pageant ===
On June 22, 2019, she competed as Miss Dominion 2019 at the Miss Virginia 2019 pageant in Lynchburg, Virginia, after a six-year hiatus from competing in pageants. For the talent competition, she completed a chemistry demonstration of the catalytic decomposition of hydrogen peroxide with potassium iodide (also known as "elephant toothpaste"). At the conclusion of the pageant, she was crowned Miss Virginia 2019 and took a year off from pharmacy school to fulfill her responsibilities as Miss Virginia.

=== Miss America 2020 competition ===
Schrier represented Virginia at the Miss America 2020 competition held at Mohegan Sun in Uncasville, Connecticut, on December 19, 2019, with a platform of "Mind Your Meds: Drug Safety and Abuse Prevention from Pediatrics to Geriatrics."

She bested first runner-up, Miss Georgia 2019, Victoria Hill, for the Miss America 2020 title and was crowned by Miss America 2019, Nia Franklin, on December 19, 2019. Along with the title of Miss America, Schrier also won a $50,000 scholarship and a $2,000 scholarship for her preliminary talent competition win. Schrier was the fourth Miss Virginia (and second Virginia Tech alumna) to win the Miss America title.

Schrier's reign was originally scheduled to end in December 2020, but the planned 2021 competition was cancelled due to the COVID-19 pandemic, with the next pageant scheduled at the end of 2021, became the longest-reigning Miss America titleholder since Mary Katherine Campbell in nearly a century.

Awards and achievements
Preceded by Nia Franklin	Miss America; 2020	Succeeded by Emma Broyles
Preceded by Emili McPhail	Miss Virginia; 2019	Succeeded by Dot Kelly
