= Nicole Johnson (Miss America) =

American model (born 1974)

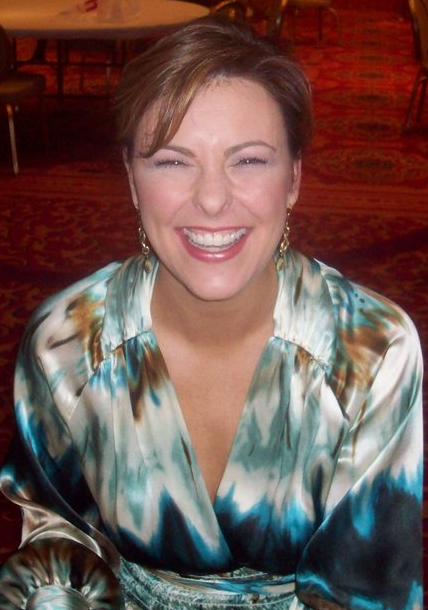
- Johnson signing autographs at the Miss America 2008 pageant
- Born: January 9, 1974 (age 52); St. Petersburg, Florida, U.S.
- Education: University of South Florida; Regent University; University of Pittsburgh
- Occupation: Vice President
- Employer: American Diabetes Association
- Title: Miss Lynchburg Festival 1998; Miss Virginia 1998; Miss America 1999
- Predecessor: Katherine Shindle
- Successor: Heather French
- Spouse: Scott Baker (m. 2003; div. 2007)
- Children: 1
- Website: www.nicolejohnson.com

Nicole Johnson (born January 9, 1974) is an American beauty queen, author, public health professional and activist. Crowned Miss America 1999 and Miss Virginia 1998, she became the first Miss America with diabetes and the first contestant to publicize the use of an insulin pump. She now advocates for diabetes research, treatment, and education, having been diagnosed with type 1 diabetes in 1993.

== Education ==
Johnson holds a B.A. in English from the University of South Florida and an M.A. in journalism from the School of Communication & the Arts at Regent University in Virginia. She also has a Master of Public Health degree from the University of Pittsburgh gained in 2007. In 2013, Johnson received a Doctor of Public Health degree from the University of South Florida.

== Pageantry ==
=== Early pageantry ===
Johnson first started competing in pageants in Florida and placed in the Top 10 at Miss Florida in 1995 and was third runner-up in the Miss Florida USA 1995 pageant. After moving to Virginia to pursue post-graduate education at Regent University she continued competing and placed in the top ten at Miss Virginia 1997.

=== Miss Virginia 1998 ===
In March 1998 she won the Miss Lynchburg Festival title and went on to win the Miss Virginia 1998 title on June 29, 1998.

=== Miss America 1999 ===
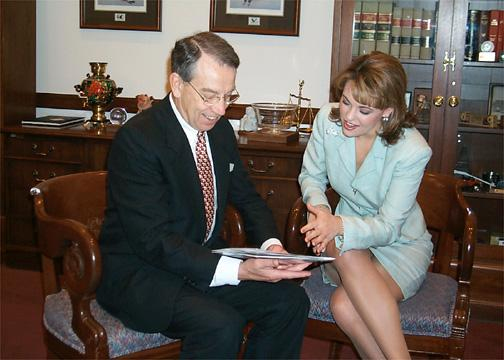
Johnson meets with Senator Chuck Grassley in 1999

In September Johnson represented Virginia in the Miss America 1999 pageant, becoming the second woman representing that state to win the Miss America title. She sang "That's Life" in the talent competition. In 1997 she started wearing an insulin pump on her hip to control her illness, which she wore while competing at Miss Virginia and Miss America, the first Miss America contestant and winner to do so.

== Diabetes activism ==
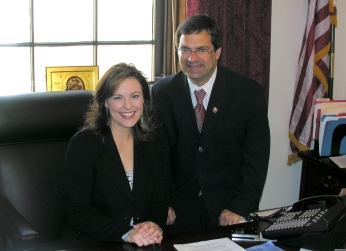
Johnson with congressman Gus Bilirakis in 2008

Johnson became a spokesperson for the American Diabetes Association in the 1990s and had testified in legislative hearings in Washington, D.C. prior to winning the Miss Virginia title.

In 2004, her communication skills and journalism background led her to become the anchor of dLife, a weekly TV series about diabetes that aired on CNBC. Johnson has also written several books over her career: three cookbooks with Mr. Food, an independent cookbook titled, Nicole Johnson's Diabetes Recipe Makeovers, an autobiography titled Living with Diabetes, and a book for young adults titled, Young Adult Type 1 Diabetes Realities.

She continues to work as a diabetes advocate and patient care expert - professionally and in a volunteer capacity. Her consulting clients have included Novo, Animas Corporation, AmMed Direct LLC and Eli Lilly and Company. On a volunteer basis, she has served in leadership roles within the JDRF and the American Diabetes Association. Her academic credentials have most recently led her to public health work at the University of South Florida where she is the Executive Director of a program she created called Bringing Science Home. In 2010, Johnson founded Students With Diabetes (SWD), at the University of South Florida, to serve the needs of the young adult population with diabetes.

== Personal life ==
Johnson was briefly engaged to investment banker Conn Jackson in 2000.

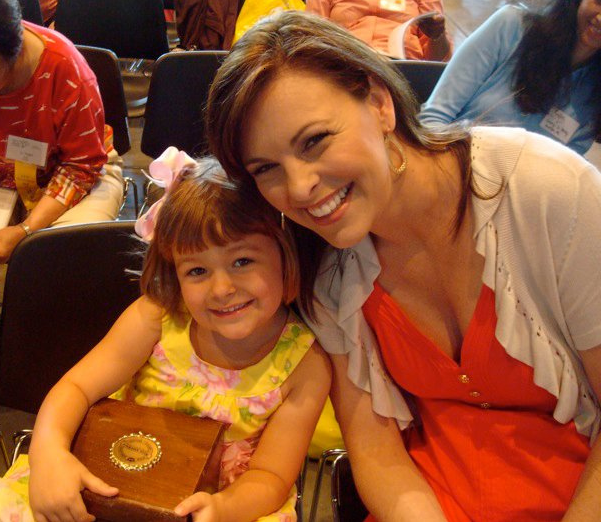
Johnson and daughter in 2010

In 2003, Johnson married journalist Scott Baker. The couple met in the mid-90s at a seminar Baker held for college students interested in news careers. Together the couple had a daughter. Johnson and Baker later divorced in 2008.

== Filmography ==
=== Television ===
Year	Title	Role
2008	dLife	Herself (host)

Awards and achievements
Preceded by Katherine Shindle (Illinois)	Miss America; 1999	Succeeded by Heather French (Kentucky)
Preceded by Kelli Quick	Miss Virginia; 1998	Succeeded by Nita Booth
