= Miss America 2020 =

93rd edition of the Miss America competition

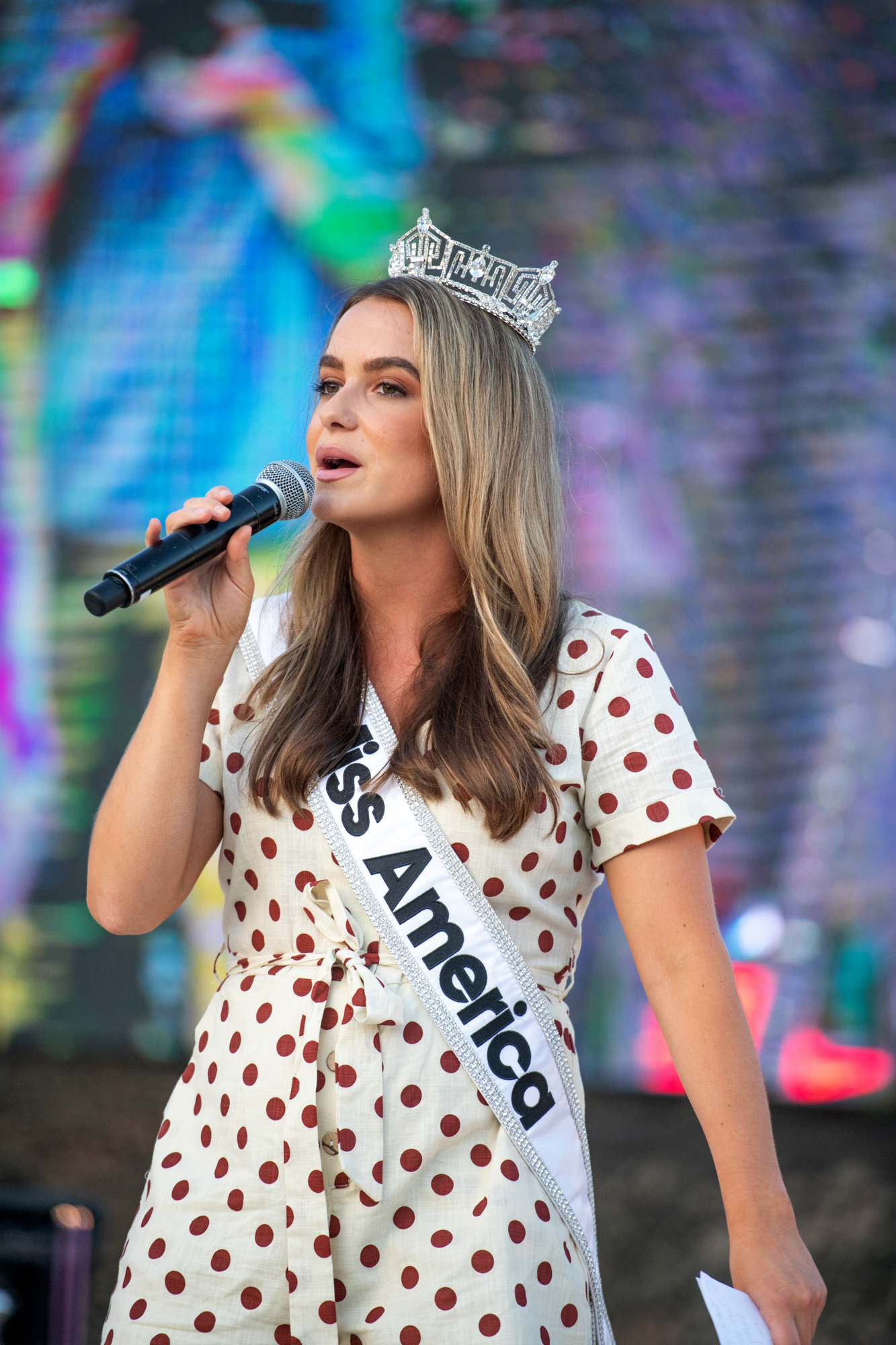
- Camille Schrier at Joint Base San Antonio-Lackland
- Date: December 29, 2019
- Presenters: Kit Hoover; Mario Lopez
- Venue: Mohegan Sun, Uncasville, Connecticut
- Broadcaster: NBC
- Entrants: 51
- Placements: 15
- Winner: Camille Schrier; Virginia

The Miss America 2020 competition was held on Thursday, December 19, 2019. This was the 93rd Miss America pageant/competition, though the Miss America Organization celebrated its 99th anniversary in 2019. This discrepancy is due to national pageants not being held from 1928 to 1932 or in 1934 because of financial problems associated with the Great Depression.

In May 2019, it was announced that the 2020 competition would be broadcast on NBC after previously being aired on ABC since 2011. NBC previously aired Miss America pageants for more than two decades until ABC was selected to air the Miss America 1998 pageant in September 1997. This is also the first beauty pageant to be aired by NBC since the network terminated its contract with the Miss Universe Organization in June 2015 over controversial remarks that were made by Donald Trump during his 2016 presidential campaign.

In July 2019, it was announced that the 2020 competition would be held at the Mohegan Sun in Uncasville, Connecticut on Thursday, December 19, 2019, making this the ninth edition of the competition that would not be held at Boardwalk Hall in Atlantic City, New Jersey.

Miss America 2019, Nia Franklin of New York, officially crowned Camille Schrier of Virginia as her successor at the end of the event.

Schrier's reign was originally to end in December 2020, but the reign will be extended due to outside factors, with the next pageant now scheduled for at least the end of 2021 due to the COVID-19 pandemic making it unfeasible to be held before 2020's end.

== Overview ==
=== Organization of competition ===
The preliminary competition consisted of private interviews with judges (20% of preliminary score), on-stage interview (15%), talent competition (50%), and "social impact pitch" (15%). Candidates were not judged in an evening gown or swimsuit competition.

The fifteen candidates from the preliminary competition with the highest overall scores were announced during the televised event. For the top 15 finalists, their preliminary scores contributed to 25% of their final night score. The top 15 was then immediately whittled down to the top 7 candidates (without any phase of competition being completed or televised). Then the top 7 competed in on-stage "job interview"; the top 5 performed their respective talents; and the top 3 candidates presented their "social impact pitch" to the panel of judges. These phases of competition contributed to 25%, 30%, and 20% of their final night score respectively. The final two candidates then were asked the same question (alternating answering first) and given the chance to agree or give rebuttal to the other candidate's answer. From this, the judges then determined the placements of the finalists.

=== Judges ===
==== Preliminary judges ====
On December 15–16, 2019, judges for the preliminary competition selected winners of the preliminary competitions as well as the top finalists for the final night of competition. The panel included composer and music producer, Anthony Barfield; model and lifestyle consultant, Holly Pelham Davis; and executive director for the Clinton Foundation, Stephanie S. Streett.

==== Final night judges ====
The panel of judges on the final night of competition on December 19, 2019, included actress, Lauren Ash; TV host, Karamo Brown; and singer, songwriter, and actress, Kelly Rowland.

== Results ==
=== Placements ===
Placement	Contestant
Miss America 2020	Camille Schrier (Virginia)
1st Runner-Up	Victoria Hill (Georgia)
2nd Runner-Up	Simone Esters (Missouri)
3rd Runner-Up	Addison Price (Oklahoma)
4th Runner-Up	Jillian Duffy (Connecticut)
Top 7	Tiara Pennington (Alabama); Monica Thompson (Colorado)
Top 15	Eileen Kim (California); Michaela McLean (Florida); Nicole Holbrook; Annika Wooton (Kansas); Jade Glab (New Jersey); Lauren Molella (New York); Alexandra Badgett (North Carolina); Chandler Foreman (Texas)

== Awards ==
=== Preliminary awards ===
Awards	Contestants
On Stage Interview	Georgia – Victoria Hill; New Jersey – Jade Glab
Private Interview	Michigan – Mallory Rivard; Oregon – Shivali Kadam
Talent	Georgia – Victoria Hill; Virginia – Camille Schrier

=== Equity and Justice Scholarship awards ===
In September 2019, the Miss America Organization announced that a new scholarship, the Equity and Justice Scholarship, will be awarded at the 2020 competition to the candidate, "who best exemplifies inclusion and acceptance of these principles in her social impact initiative."

Results	Contestant	Social Impact Initiative
Winner	North Carolina – Alexandra Badgett	N.I.N.E.: No is Not Enough
Finalists	Illinois – Ariel Beverly	Advocating for Arts Education
Finalists	Maryland – Caitlyn Stupi	#CommonCents: Promoting Financial Literacy at the Primary Grade Level
Finalists	Michigan – Mallory Rivard	Read to Succeed
Finalists	Tennessee – Brianna Mason	Advocates for Autism

=== Social Impact Initiative Scholarship awards ===
Formerly called “Quality of Life Award”

Results	Contestant	Social Impact Initiative
Winner	Kansas – Annika Wooton	The Artist's Fingerprint: The Transformative Power of the Arts
1st runner-up	South Carolina – Morgan Nichols	Stronger with STEM
2nd runner-up	South Dakota – Amber Hulse	Operation Overload
Finalists	Nevada – Nasya Mancini	Patch for a Purpose #FindYourVoice
Finalists	Utah – Dexonna Talbot	Servesteem – Increasing Self-Esteem Through Service

=== STEM Scholarship awards ===
Results	Contestant
Winner	South Carolina – Morgan Nichols
1st runner-up	Massachusetts – Lyndsey Littlefield
2nd runner-up	New York – Lauren Molella
Finalists	Arkansas – Darynne Dahlem; Montana – Mo Shea

=== Women in Business Scholarship awards ===
Results	Contestant
Winner	Kentucky – Alex Francke
1st runner-up	Hawaii – Nicole Holbrook
Finalists	Arizona – Jacqueline Thomas; District of Columbia – Katelynne Cox; Idaho – Grace Zimmerman

=== Other awards ===
Awards	Contestant(s)
Miss Congeniality	Idaho – Grace Zimmerman
Dr. & Mrs. David Allman Medical Scholarship	Montana – Mo Shea
Beacom College STEM Scholarship	Missouri – Simone Esters
Non-finalist Talent Award	Louisiana – Meagan Crews
Tiffany Phillips Scholar-Athlete Scholarship	Nebraska – Allie Swanson

== Candidates ==
The Miss America 2020 candidates were:

State or district	Name	Hometown	Age (Note: Ages at the time of national competition)	Talent	Social Impact Initiative	Placement	Special awards	Notes	
Alabama	Tiara Pennington	Helena	20	Classical Vocal, “Nessun Dorma" from Turandot	National Psoriasis Foundation: Psoriasis Take Action	Top 7		Previously Miss Alabama's Outstanding Teen 2016	
Alaska	Maile Johnston	Eagle River	20	Contemporary Dance, "It's All Coming Back to Me Now"	A Case for Hope				
Arizona	Jacqueline Thomas	Phoenix	24	Piano, "Malagueña"	Lady Leaders		Women in Business Scholarship Finalist		
Arkansas	Darynne Dahlem	Greenwood	22	Vocal, “Somewhere" from West Side Story	Refashioning Lives: What You Can Spare		STEM Scholarship Finalist		
California	Eileen Kim	Orange	22	Violin	Let's Talk: Opening the Discussion and Prevention of Self-Harm	Top 15			
Colorado	Monica Thompson	Aurora	24	Classical Vocal, "Les Filles de Cadix"	Building Strong Girls	Top 7			
Connecticut	Jillian Duffy	Burlington	22	Vocal, "Once Upon a Time" from Brooklyn	Jillian's Journey: Pediatric Cancer Research and Awareness	4th runner-up			
Delaware	Hillary May	Mount Vernon, IN	23	Vocal, "Valerie"	Bring Awareness to the Stigma Surrounding Mental Illness				
District of Columbia	Katelynne Cox	Washington, D.C.	25	Vocal	Silence Is Not Compliance		Women in Business Scholarship Finalist	Previously Miss Missouri for Miss Earth United States 2016	
Florida	Michaela McLean	Clermont	21	Lyrical Dance, "You Say"	Brave and Beautiful, LLC	Top 15		Previously Miss Florida's Outstanding Teen 2014	
Georgia	Victoria Hill	Canton	20	Classical Vocal, "Chacun le sait" from La fille du régiment	Flip the Script on Foster Care	1st runner-up	Preliminary On Stage Interview Award Preliminary Talent Award		
Hawaii	Nicole Holbrook	Laie	20	Classical Piano, “Concerto in A Minor"	SNAP: Service Nurtures All People	Top 15	Women in Business Scholarship 1st runner-up		
Idaho	Grace Zimmerman	Weiser	21	Ceramics Demonstration	Be the Impact: American Heart Association		Miss Congeniality Women in Business Scholarship Finalist	Was originally named first runner-up at Miss Idaho 2019 pageant Assumed the title when original winner, Rachel Forest, stepped down to continue to pursue her education	
Illinois	Ariel Beverly	Springfield	24	Vocal, "Son of a Preacher Man"	Advocating for Arts Education		Equity & Justice Scholarship Finalist		
Indiana	Tiarra Taylor	New Albany	21	Vocal, "You Will Be Found" from Dear Evan Hansen	Bringing Advantages to Disadvantaged Youth				
Iowa	Emily Tinsman	Bettendorf	22	Classical Vocal	Americans for the Arts – Advocate, Educate, Invest				
Kansas	Annika Wooton	Overland Park	25	Speed painting	The Artist's Fingerprint: The Transformative Power of the Arts	Top 15	Social Impact Initiative Scholarship Winner		
Kentucky	Alex Francke	Lexington	22	Vocal, "Maybe This Time"	Adopt an Art		Women in Business Scholarship Winner	Previously Miss Kentucky's Outstanding Teen 2014	
Louisiana	Meagan Crews	Bossier City	22	Vocal	LEAD – Leadership Empowerment and Development		Non-finalist Talent Award	Previously Miss Louisiana's Outstanding Teen 2014	
Maine	Carolyn Brady	Brunswick	22	Violin	Immigration Builds Our Nation			First African American to win Miss Maine	
Maryland	Caitlyn Stupi	Westminster	21	Cello, "The Swan"	#CommonCents: Promoting Financial Literacy at the Primary Grade Level		Equity & Justice Scholarship Finalist		
Massachusetts	Lyndsey Littlefield	Taunton	22	Lyrical Dance	Girls, INC.		STEM Scholarship 1st runner-up		
Michigan	Mallory Rivard	Bay City	24	Vocal	Read to Succeed		Equity & Justice Scholarship Finalist Private Interview Award		
Minnesota	Kathryn Kueppers	Mendota Heights	21	Jazz Vocal, "Nature Boy"	The Invisible Crown			Daughter of Miss Minnesota 1983, Vicki Plaster Kueppers	
Mississippi	Mary Margaret Hyer	Hattiesburg	23	Vocal, "Queen of the Night" aria by Mozart	Promoting Organ and Tissue Donation				
Missouri	Simone Esters	Columbia	20	Baton Twirling, "Turn the Beat Around"	Mentoring Youth	2nd runner-up	Beacom College STEM Scholarship		
Montana	Mo Shea	Helena	22	Vocal, "Let Me Be Your Star" from Smash	Love the Skin You're In: Skin Cancer Prevention		Dr. & Mrs. David Allman Medical Scholarship STEM Scholarship Finalist	Previously Miss Montana's Outstanding Teen 2012	
Nebraska	Allie Swanson	Omaha	24	Vocal	CyberSmartz: Protecting Yourself in a Digital World		Tiffany Phillips Scholar-Athlete Scholarship Winner	Sister of Miss Nebraska 2014 and Miss Nebraska USA 2020, Megan Swanson	
Nevada	Nasya Mancini	Sparks	22	Comedic Monologue/Accent Impersonations	Upstage Dramatically Changing the Lives of Children		Social Impact Initiative Scholarship Finalist		
New Hampshire	Sarah Tubbs	Sandown	25	Lyrical Dance	Choose One – Revolutionize the World				
New Jersey	Jade Glab	Belmar	19	Classical Vocal, "O mio babbino caro" from Gianni Schicchi	Healthy Children, Strong America	Top 15	Preliminary On Stage Interview Award		Later Miss World USA 2026, but was moved to 2027 and replaced by runner-up Mary Sickler.
New Mexico	Misa Tran	Alamogordo	20	Dance	Veterans: Home Is Where the Heart Is			Previously Distinguished Young Woman of New Mexico 2017	
New York	Lauren Molella	Millbrook	24	Ballet en Pointe	Voices of Honor: Salute and Support Our Military	Top 15	STEM Scholarship Finalist	Daughter of Miss Massachusetts 1983 and National Sweetheart 1982, Holly Mayer, and niece of Miss New York 1989, Lisa Molella Previously Miss New York's Outstanding Teen 2011	
North Carolina	Alexandra Badgett	Reidsville	22	Tap Dance, "This Is Me" by Keala Settle	N.I.N.E.: No is Not Enough	Top 15	Equity & Justice Scholarship Winner	Previously Miss North Carolina's Outstanding Teen 2012	
North Dakota	Haley Wolfe	Carrington	22	Dance	#BeThe1To			Previously Distinguished Young Woman of North Dakota 2016	
Ohio	Caroline Grace Williams	Cincinnati	24	Classical Vocal	Caroline's Crisis Call				
Oklahoma	Addison Price	Edmond	20	Jazz Dance, Medley of "Diamonds Are a Girl's Best Friend"	Empowering Individuals with Disabilities Through Self-Advocacy	3rd runner-up		Previously Miss Oklahoma's Outstanding Teen 2016 (Note: Appointed the state title after Nicole Jia crowned Miss America's Outstanding Teen 2017)	
Oregon	Shivali Kadam	Portland	25	Vocal, “Reflection" from Mulan	STEM to Bloom		Private Interview Award		
Pennsylvania	Tiffany Seitz	Freeport	23	Dance	Adoption Advocacy: Restoring Hope, Transforming Lives				
Rhode Island	Molly Andrade	Middletown	20	Irish Step Dance	Self-Defense for Women as a Means of Empowerment				
South Carolina	Morgan Nichols	Lexington	22	Vocal, “Bridge Over Troubled Water"	Stronger with STEM		Social Impact Initiative Scholarship 1st runner-up STEM Scholarship Winner		
South Dakota	Amber Hulse	Hot Springs	20	Piano	Operation Overload		Social Impact Initiative Scholarship 2nd runner-up	Later Miss South Dakota USA 2023	
Tennessee	Brianna Mason	Nashville	23	Piano, "Piano Fantasy" by William Joseph	Advocates for Autism		Equity & Justice Scholarship Finalist	First African American to win Miss Tennessee	
Texas	Chandler Foreman	Pearland	22	Flute, "Ain't No Mountain High Enough"	Leader Within	Top 15			
Utah	Dexonna Talbot	Spanish Fork	19	Ballet en Pointe	Servesteem – Increasing Self-Esteem Through Service		Social Impact Initiative Scholarship Finalist		
Vermont	Jillian Fisher	Burlington	20	Vocal, "Bennie and the Jets"	Fighting Addiction				
Virginia	Camille Schrier	Richmond	24	Chemistry Demonstration	Mind Your Meds: Drug Safety and Abuse Prevention from Pediatrics to Geriatrics	Miss America 2020	Preliminary Talent Award	Current student at VCU School of Pharmacy	
Washington	Abbie Kondel	Brush Prairie	21	Power Tap Dance, "Sax"	Be Smart Don't Start: Drug & Alcohol Awareness				
West Virginia	Toriane Graal	Morgantown	21	Baton Twirling, "Man of La Mancha (I, Don Quixote)"	Let's Be Clear – Children's Leukemia				
Wisconsin	Alyssa Bohm	Mount Pleasant	24	Tap Dance, "Feeling Good"	Enhancing Opportunities for Individuals with Special Needs				
Wyoming	Jordan Hardman	Rock Springs	20	Clogging, "9 to 5"	Let Them Know We Care: Packages to the Military				
