= Scott Baker =

Scott Baker may refer to:

- Scott Baker (marine biologist) (born 1954), American specialist in conservation genetics of whale, dolphins and porpoises
- Scott Baker (right-handed pitcher) (born 1981), American professional baseball pitcher
- Scott Baker (left-handed pitcher) (born 1970), American left-handed baseball pitcher
- Scott Baker (racing driver) (1957–2000), American stock car racer
- Scott Baker (judge) (born 1937), British Lord Justice of Appeal
- Scott Baker (writer) (born 1947), American writer of fantasy, horror, & science fiction; also a translator from the French
- Scott Baker (journalist) (born 1964), American editor of The Blaze
- Scott Thompson Baker (born 1960), American television actor
- Scott Baker (darts player) (born 1986), English darts player
