= Miss Virginia =

Beauty pageant competition

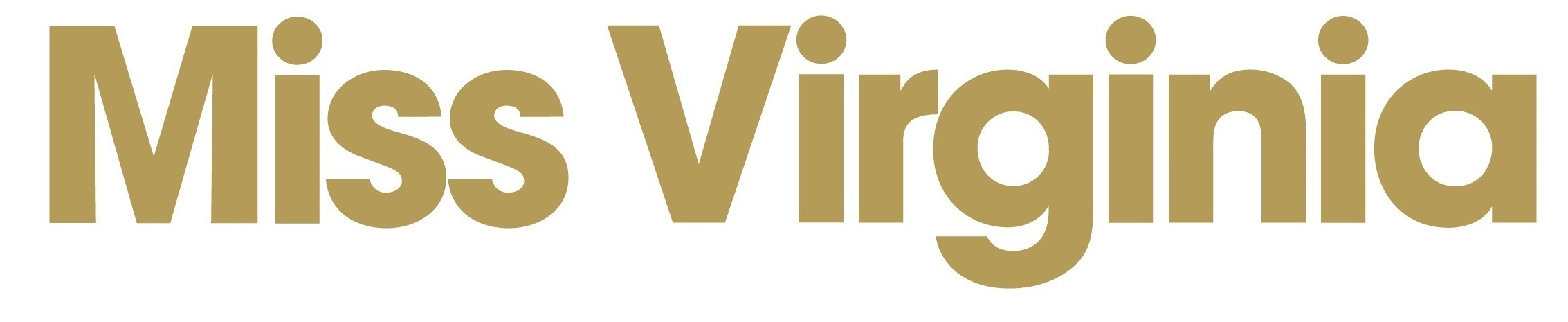
- Formation: 1923
- Type: Beauty pageant
- Headquarters: Roanoke
- Location: Virginia
- Members: Miss America
- Official language: English
- Key people: Elaine Aikens, Mark Schreier, Nancy Lucy (Executive Director)
- Website: Official website

The Miss Virginia competition is a scholarship pageant for women, with the titleholder representing Virginia in the Miss America pageant. The competition was founded in 1953 as a scholarship contest for young women, although women had represented Virginia in the Miss America pageant since the 1930s. Four Miss Virginia winners have gone on to be crowned Miss America, including former national titleholder Caressa Cameron.

To compete in the Miss Virginia pageant, a contestant must first win one of many local competitions. Contestants may compete at the local and state level more than once, but having won a state title may only compete in the national Miss America competition one time. The state pageant is held in Roanoke, Virginia at the Roanoke Civic Center in June or July.

During her reign, Miss Virginia travels over 40,000 miles across the state making appearances to further her social impact initiative, visit schools, and for the Miss America Organization's national American Heart Association's "Go Red" campaign.

Dorcas Campbell from Farfield was Miss Virginia of 1963, won many singing contests, and was a very talented opera singer. Kristi Lauren Glakas, Miss Virginia 2005, is one of only seven women who have competed in the Miss America, Miss Teen USA, and Miss USA competitions. She was Miss Virginia Teen USA 1999 and Miss Virginia USA 2004, placing in the top ten at Miss Teen USA 1999 and was a non-finalist at Miss USA 2004. Two other Miss Virginia titleholders later competed in the Miss USA pageant: Jennifer Pitts was Miss Virginia USA 2005 and Shannon DePuy was Miss Florida USA 1995.

Maddie Merchant of Lebanon was crowned Miss Virginia on June 27, 2026, at the Berglund Center Auditorium in Roanoke, Virginia. She will compete for the title of Miss America 2027 in West Palm Beach, Florida from September 1–6, 2026.

== Gallery of past titleholders ==
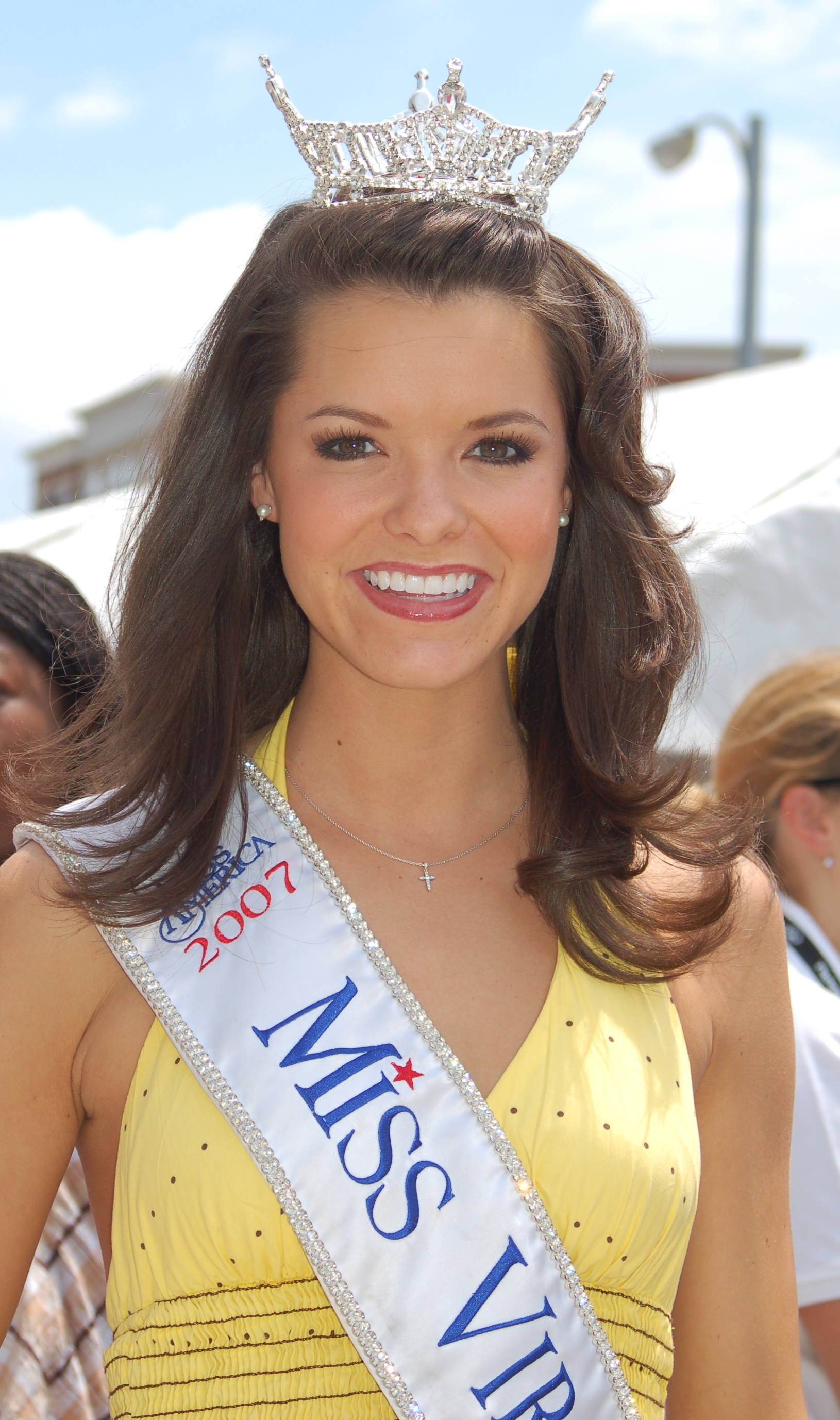
Hannah Kiefer,
Miss Virginia 2007

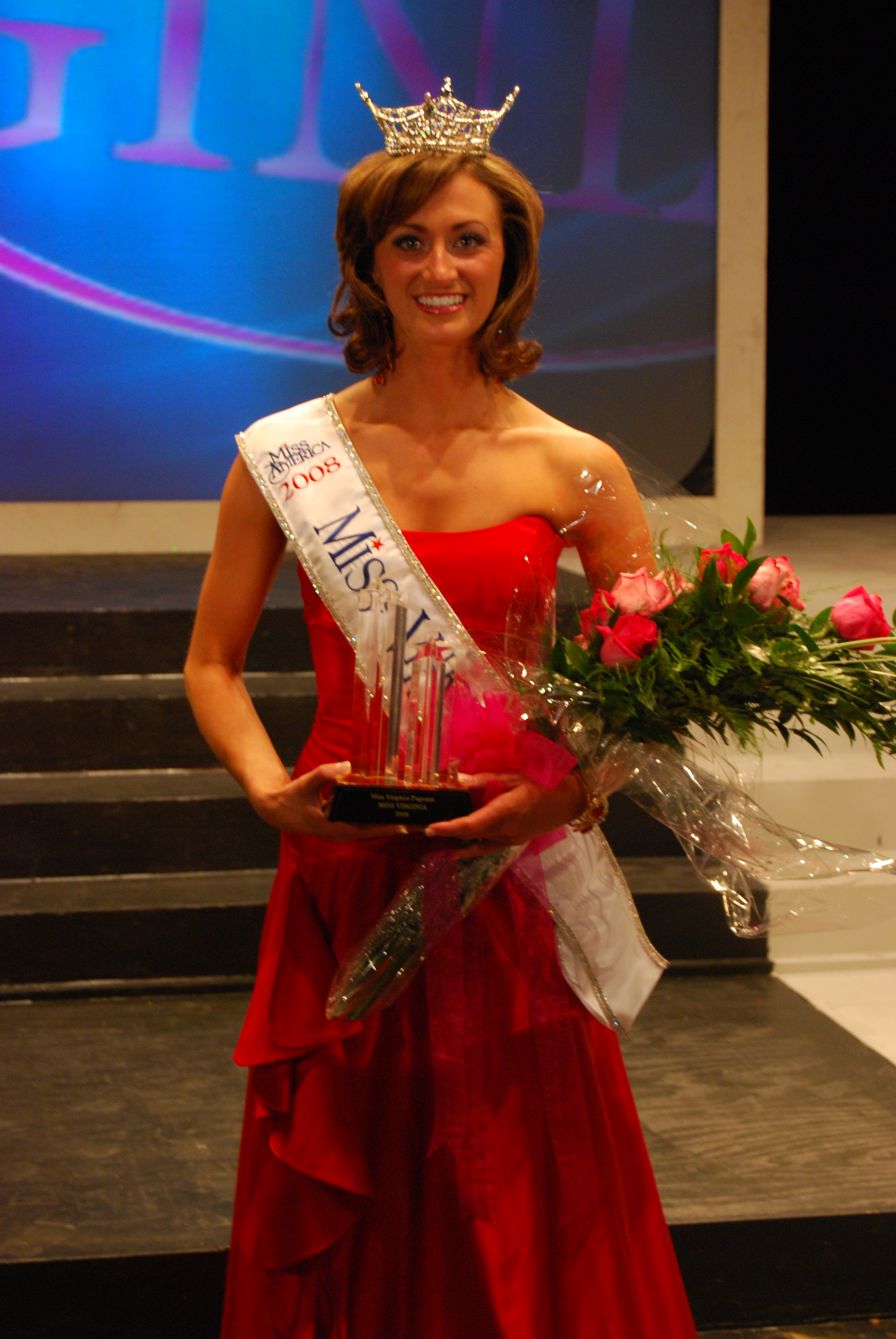
Tara Wheeler,
Miss Virginia 2008

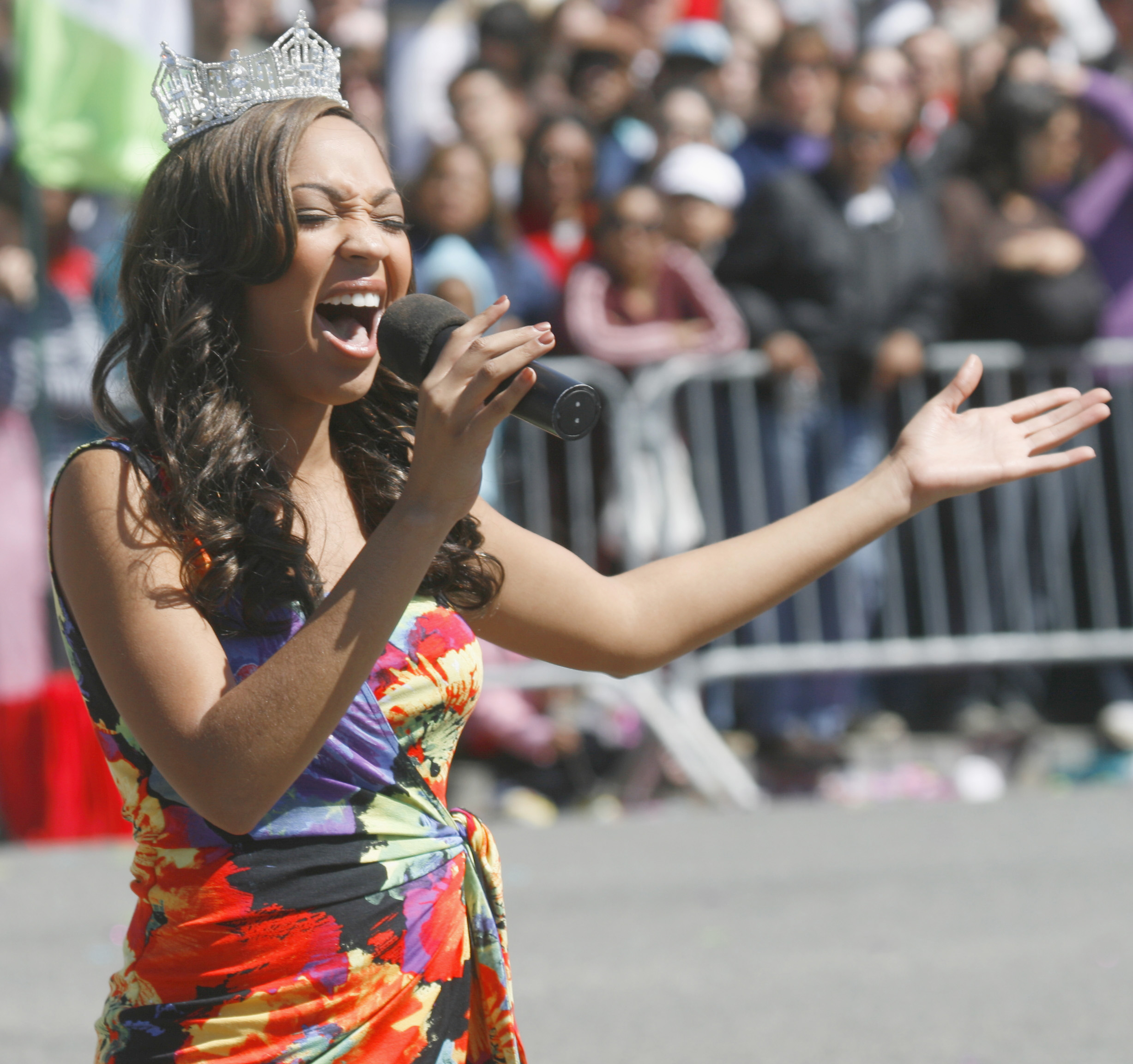
Caressa Cameron,
Miss Virginia 2009 and Miss America 2010

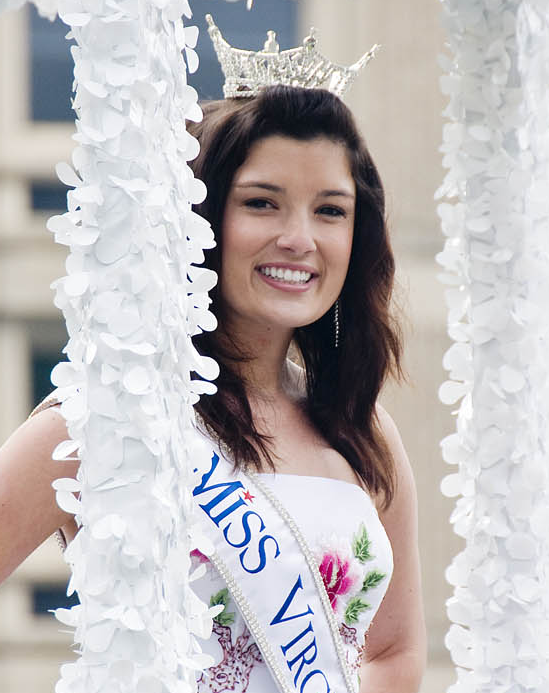
Chinah Helmandollar,
Miss Virginia 2009

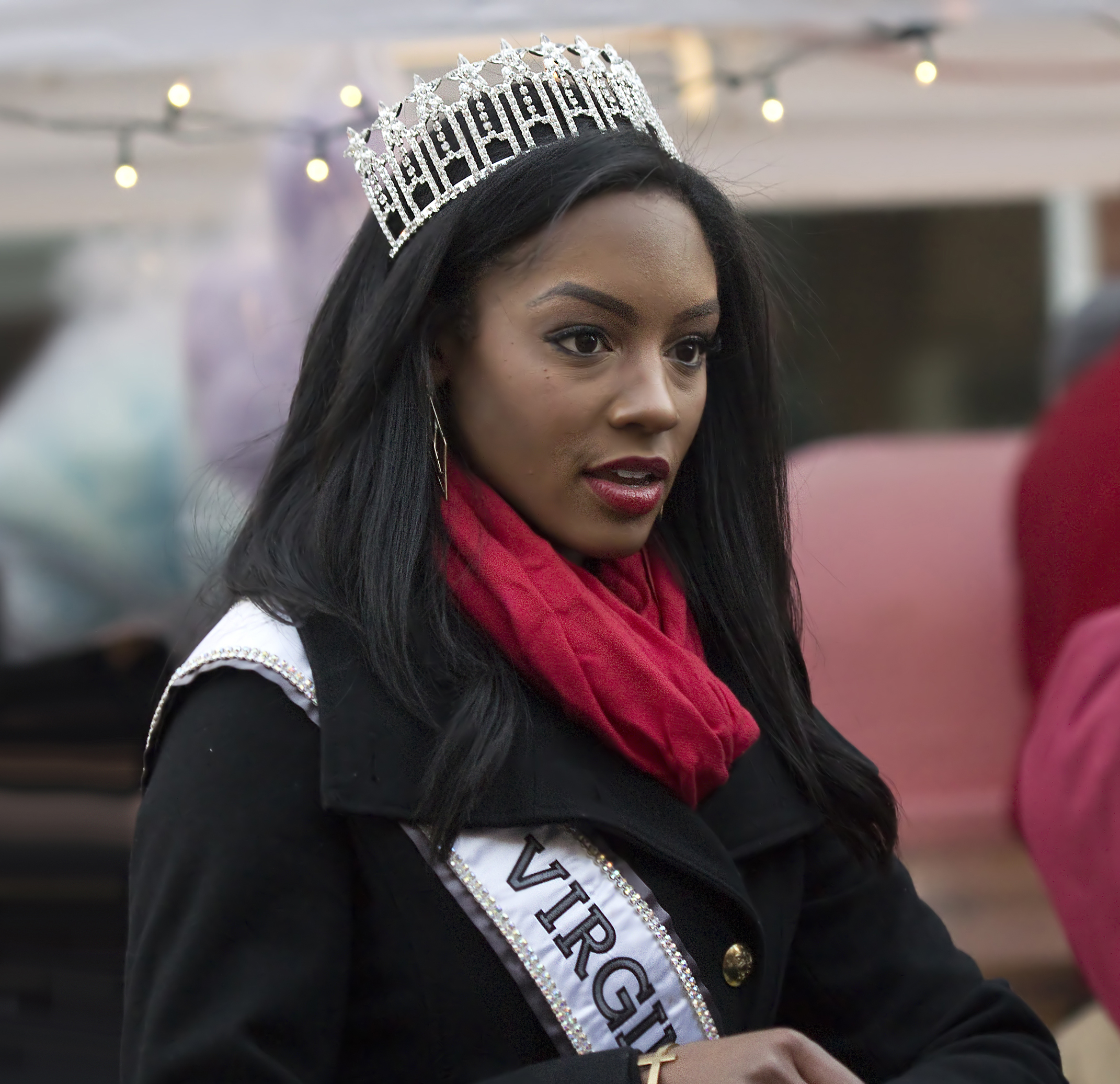
Desiree Williams,
Miss Virginia 2013 (when she was Miss Virginia USA 2016)

== Results summary ==
The following is a visual summary of the past results of Miss Virginia titleholders at the national Miss America pageants/competitions. The year in parentheses indicates the year of the national competition during which a placement and/or award was garnered, not the year attached to the contestant's state title.

=== Placements ===
- Miss Americas: Kylene Barker (1979), Nicole Johnson (1999), Caressa Cameron (2010), Camille Schrier (2020)
- 1st runners-up: Julianne Smith (1987), Cullen Johnson (1995), Courtney Garrett (2015)
- 2nd runners-up: Anne Lee Ceglis (1954)
- 3rd runners-up: Evangeline Glidewell (1933), Kristi Lauren Glakas (2006), Hannah Kiefer (2008)
- 4th runners-up: Rose Marie Elliott (1939), Nancy Glisson (1994)
- Top 10: Dorcas Campbell (1964), Cherie Davis (1969), Pamela Polk (1977), Heidi Lammi (1988), Shannon DePuy (1991), Nancy Redd (2004), Caitlin Uze (2011), Cecili Weber (2018)
- Top 15: Eleanor V. Reid (1926), Dolores Taylor (1936), Jacquelyn McWin (1941), Elizabeth Crot (2012), Savannah Lane (2016)
- Top 16: Frances L. Sultan (1937)

=== Awards ===
==== Preliminary awards ====
- Preliminary Lifestyle and Fitness: Linda Moyer (1972), Julianne Smith (1987), Cullen Johnson (1995), Nancy Redd (2004), Kristi Lauren Glakas (2006)
- Preliminary On Stage Interview: Emili McPhail (2019)
- Preliminary Talent: Anne Lee Ceglis (1954), Dorcas Campbell (1964), Cherie Davis (1969), Pamela Polk (1977), Crystal Lewis (2000), Caressa Cameron (2010), Camille Schrier (2020)

==== Non-finalist awards ====
- Non-finalist Talent: Rebecca Richardson (1957), Alice Sue Williams (1960), Patricia Gaulding (1963), Carolyn Eddy (1965), Sydney Lewis (1970), Terri Bartlett (1978), Susan Parker (1984), Tami Elliott (1990), Sheri Huffman (1991), Lora Flattum (1992), Michelle Kang (1997), Kelli Quick (1998), Crystal Lewis (2000)

==== Other awards ====
- Miss Congeniality: Linda Maclin (1967)
- Charles and Theresa Brown Scholarship: Hannah Kiefer (2008), Courtney Garrett (2015)
- Children's Champion Award: Nancy Redd (2004), Mariah Rice (2005)
- Quality of Life Award Finalists: Adrianna Sgarlata (2007), Tara Wheeler (2008), Caitlin Uze (2011), Courtney Garrett (2015)
- Waterford Crystal Business Scholarship: Cullen Johnson (1995)
- Women in STEM Winners: Victoria Chuah (2023)

== Winners ==
- Declared as winner
- Ended as a runner-up
- Ended as a finalist or semi-finalist

Year	Name	Hometown	Age	Local Title	Miss America Talent	Placement at Miss America	Special scholarships at Miss America	Notes
2026	Maddie Merchant	Lebanon	22	Miss Lynchburg	Clogging			
2025	Madison Whitbeck	Arlington	20	Miss Arlington	Vocal			
2024	Carlehr Swanson	Charlottesville	25	Miss Blue Ridge	Vocal/Piano, "Get Here"			
2023	Katie Rose	Martinsburg	27	Miss Loudoun County	Ballet en Pointe			
2022	Victoria Chuah	Ashburn	23	Miss Arlington	Ballet en Pointe		Women in STEM Winner	Later Miss Vermont USA 2025; Top 10 at Miss USA 2025
2021	Tatum Sheppard	Milan, TN	22	Miss Central Virginia	Vocal			Daughter of Kellye Cash, Miss America 1987 Eligible as a student and recent graduate of Liberty University
2019–20 (Note: Appointed titleholder had to reign for a full year in 2020 after state and national pageants postponed to 2021 due to the COVID-19 pandemic)	Dot Kelly	Hampton	22	Miss Lynchburg	Tap Dance	Did not compete; originally 1st runner-up, later assumed the title after Schrier won Miss America 2020		Featured as Macy's Starlet at Macy's Thanksgiving Day Parade 2019
2019–20	Camille Schrier	Newtown, PA	24	Miss Dominion	Chemistry Demonstration	Winner	Preliminary Talent Award	Student at VCU School of Pharmacy at time of crowning
2018	Emili McPhail	Roseboro, NC	22	Miss Arlington	Piano, "The Phantom of the Opera"		Preliminary On Stage Interview Award	Previously Miss North Carolina's Outstanding Teen 2013; Top 8 at Miss America's Outstanding Teen 2014 pageant Eligible as student at Hollins University
2017	Cecili Weber	Roanoke	22	Miss Arlington	Contemporary Jazz Dance, "Last Dance"	Top 10		Previously Miss Ohio's Outstanding Teen 2010; Top 10 at Miss America's Outstanding Teen 2011 pageant Contestant at National Sweetheart 2013, as Miss Ohio
2016	Michaela Sigmon	Chesapeake	21	Miss Greater Richmond	Tap Dance, "Let's Get Loud" by Jennifer Lopez			
2015	Savannah Lane	Midlothian	19	Miss Piedmont Region	Vocal, "Don't Rain on My Parade" from Funny Girl	Top 15		
2014	Courtney Garrett	Pamplin	21	Miss State Fair of Virginia	Classical Vocal, "Parla più piano"	1st runner-up	Charles & Theresa Brown Scholarship Quality of Life Award Finalist	Previously Miss Virginia's Outstanding Teen 2009; Top 10 at Miss America's Outstanding Teen 2010 pageant
2013	Desiree Williams	Newport News	24	Miss Arlington	Piano, "Cubana Cubana" by Maksim Mrvica			Previously National Sweetheart 2012 Later Miss Virginia USA 2016; Top 10 at Miss USA 2016 pageant
2012	Rosemary Willis	Chesapeake	21	Miss Roanoke Valley	Vocal, "I (Who Have Nothing)"			
2011	Elizabeth Crot	Chesapeake	23	Miss Arlington	Classical Vocal, "Sempre Libera" from La traviata	Top 15		
2010	Caitlin Uze	Arlington	22	Miss Greater Richmond	Irish Treble Reel Dance, "Riverdance"	Top 10	Marion A. Crooker Award Quality of Life Award Finalist	
2009	Chinah Helmandollar	Hardy		Miss Smith Mountain Lake		Did not compete; originally placed as a Top 10 semifinalist, later assumed the title after Cameron won Miss America 2010		
2009	Caressa Cameron	Fredericksburg	21	Miss Arlington	Vocal, "Listen"	Winner	Preliminary Talent Award	4th runner-up at National Sweetheart 2006 pageant
2008	Tara Wheeler	Woodbridge	24	Miss Arlington	Vocal, "Don't Let the Sun Go Down on Me"			
2007	Hannah Kiefer	High Point, NC	21	Miss Mountain Empire	Classical Ballet en Pointe, "The Chocolate Dance" from The Nutcracker	3rd runner-up	Charles and Theresa Brown Scholarship	Eligible as a student at Hollins University
2006	Adrianna Sgarlata	Fairfax Station	24	Miss Arlington	Classical Vocal, "Chi Il Bel Sogno di Doretta" from La rondine		Quality of Life Award Finalist	
2005	Kristi Lauren Glakas	Centreville	24	Miss Apple Blossom Festival	Vocal, "In His Eyes" from Jekyll & Hyde	3rd runner-up	Preliminary Swimsuit Award	Triple Crown winner: Previously Miss Virginia Teen USA 1999; Top 10 at Miss Teen USA 1999 pageant; Previously Miss Virginia USA 2004
2004	Mariah Rice	Mechanicsville	24	Miss Greater Richmond	Lyrical Dance, "I Am Changing"		Children's Champion Award	
2003	Nancy Redd	Martinsville	22	Miss Martinsville-Henry County	Piano, "Malagueña"	Top 10	Children's Champion Award Preliminary Swimsuit Award	
2002	Jennifer Pitts	Arlington	24	Miss Apple Blossom Festival	Contemporary Ballet en Pointe, "Standing in Motion" by Yanni			Contestant at National Sweetheart 2001 pageant Later Miss Virginia USA 2005
2001	Meghan Shanley	Virginia Beach	21	Miss Hampton Holly Days Festival	Vocal, "Big Time"			
2000	Jacqueline Cook	Colonial Heights	24	Miss Hampton/Newport News	Jazz en Pointe, "Jump, Shout, Boogie"			
1999	Crystal Lewis	Newport News	21	Miss Lynchburg Festival	Vocal, "I Believe in You and Me"		Non-finalist Talent Award Preliminary Talent Award	
1998	Thomanita (Nita) Leona Booth	Tidewater	19	Miss Tidewater	Vocal	Did not compete; later assumed the title after Johnson won Miss America 1999		
1998	Thomanita (Nita) Leona Booth	Tidewater	19	Miss Tidewater	Vocal			First African American titleholder
1998	Nicole Johnson	Virginia Beach	24	Miss Lynchburg Festival	Vocal, "That's Life"	Winner		
1997	Kelli Quick	Lynchburg	20	Miss Lynchburg Festival	Vocal, "I Go To the Rock" from The Preacher's Wife		Non-finalist Talent Award	
1996	Michelle Kang	Fredericksburg	22	Miss Apple Blossom Festival	Classical Piano, "Hungarian Rhapsody No. 2"		Non-finalist Talent Award	First Asian-American titleholder
1995	Amber Medlin	Virginia Beach	23	Miss Virginia Beach	Classical Piano, "Polonaise in A-flat major, Op. 53"			Assumed Ballengee's title
1995	Andrea Ballengee	Yorktown		Miss Hampton/Newport News	Dance	Unable to compete; initially allowed to keep her title after it was discovered she had embellished her academic record but was stripped of crown later the same month after further discrepancies were revealed		
1995	Andrea Ballengee	Yorktown		Miss Hampton/Newport News	Dance			Previously Miss Virginia Teen USA 1992; Top 12 at Miss Teen USA 1992 pageant Later Mrs. California and Mrs. America 2006 under married name Andrea Preuss; Top 10 at Mrs. World 2006 pageant
1994	Cullen Johnson	Norfolk	23	Miss Central Shenandoah Valley	Classical Piano, Sonata Pathetique	1st runner-up	Preliminary Swimsuit Award Waterford Crystal Business Scholarship	
1993	Nancy Glisson	Williamsburg	22	Miss Lynchburg Festival	Popular Vocal, "I Will Always Love You"	4th runner-up		
1992	Lora Flattum	Isle of Wight	24	Miss Apple Blossom Festival	Classical Piano, "Hungarian Rhapsody No. 2 in C Minor"		Non-finalist Talent Award	
1991	Sheri Huffman	Lynchburg	23	Miss Amherst County	Vocal, "If I Can Dream"		Non-finalist Talent Award	
1990	Shannon DePuy	Lynchburg	19	Miss Amherst County	Classical Piano, "Revolutionary Etude"	Top 10		Later Miss Florida USA 1995 & top 6 at Miss USA 1995
1989	Tami Elliott	Newport News	24	Miss Portsmouth-Seawall Festival	Gymnastics Dance Routine, "The Phantom of the Opera"		Non-finalist Talent Award	
1988	April Fleming		23	Miss Richmond	Vocal, "New York State of Mind"			
1987	Heidi Lammi	Alexandria	26	Miss Northern Virginia	Ballet en Pointe, Grande Tarantelle	Top 10		
1986	Julianne Smith	Yorktown	21	Miss Williamsburg	Vocal, "Golden Rainbow"	1st runner-up	Preliminary Swimsuit Award	
1985	Kimberly Johnson	Coeburn	19	Miss Lonesome Pine	Vocal & Piano, "Swing Low, Sweet Chariot"			
1984	Susan Carter Parker	Covington	23	Miss Alleghany Highlands	Classical Vocal, "My Man's Gone Now"		Non-finalist Talent Award	
1983	Lisa Aliff	Roanoke	23	Miss Vinton Dogwood Festival	Vocal & Dance, "Manhattan" & "Broadway Rhythm"			
1982	Beverly Cooke	Richmond	24	Miss Portsmouth-Seawall Festival	Vocal Medley, "Smile" & "Happy Days Are Here Again"			Mother of Miss Virginia's Outstanding Teen 2006, Brittany Young
1981	Vicky Pulliam	Martinsville	21	Miss Martinsville/Henry County	Semi-classical Vocal, "Art Is Calling For Me" from The Enchantress by Victor Herbert			
1980	Holly Jereme	Roanoke	23	Miss Roanoke Valley	Vocal & Dance, "City Lights"			
1979	Darlene McIntosh	Chesapeake	22	Miss Chesapeake	Classical Piano, "Prelude in C sharp minor"			
1978	Paige Brown	Alexandria		Miss Fairfax County		Did not compete; later assumed title after Barker won Miss America 1979		
1978	Kylene Barker	Galax	22	Miss Pulaski County	Gymnastics Routine, "Gonna Fly Now" & "Feelin So Good"	Winner		
1977	Terri Bartlett	Newport News	24	Miss Norfolk	Classical Piano, "Rhapsody in C Minor"		Non-finalist Talent Award	
1976	Pamela Polk	Richmond	22	Miss Peanut Festival	Classical Vocal, "Mi Chiamano Mimi" from La bohème	Top 10	Preliminary Talent Award	
1975	Joan Grady	Virginia Beach	21	Miss Virginia Beach	Classical Vocal, "Vissi d'arte"			
1974	Stephanie Dowdy	Virginia Beach	18	Miss Virginia Beach	Vocal, "I've Gotta Be Me"			
1973	Elinda Gail Vandeventer	Pulaski	20	Miss Pulaski	Classical Vocal, "The Telephone Aria"			
1972	Dona Marie Pillow	Lynchburg	22	Miss Lynchburg	Vocal, "Memories"			Cousin of country singer, Ray Pillow
1971	Linda Moyer	Norfolk	20	Miss Norfolk	Vocal & Dance		Preliminary Swimsuit Award	
1970	Jeannette Smith	Roanoke	19	Miss Roanoke Valley	Classical Piano, "Toccata" by Aram Khachaturian			
1969	Sydney Lewis	Hampton	19	Miss Hampton/Newport News	Original Monologue, "Prisoner at the Bar"			
1968	Cherie Davis	Clifton Forge	20	Miss Alleghany Highlands	Classical Vocal, "Mon cœur s'ouvre à ta voix"	Top 10	Preliminary Talent Award	
1967	Barbara Yost	Roanoke	19	Miss Roanoke Valley	Piano, "Grande valse brillante in E flat major"			
1966	Linda Maclin	Roanoke	18	Miss Roanoke Valley	Modern Jazz Dance		Miss Congeniality	
1965	Jean Inge	Norfolk	22	Miss Norfolk	Speech about Politics & Government entitled Democracy			
1964	Carolyn Eddy	Norfolk	21	Miss Norfolk	Dramatic Reading		Non-finalist Talent Award	
1963	Dorcas Campbell	Fairfield		Miss Rockbridge County	Vocal Medley, "Près des remparts de Séville" from Carmen & Songs from West Side Story	Top 10	Preliminary Talent Award	
1962	Patricia Gaulding	Richmond	19	Miss Richmond	Caricature Sketching & Original Comedy Monologue		Non-finalist Talent Award	
1961	Charlotte Thomas	Roanoke	19	Miss Lynchburg	Piano, "Malagueña"			
1960	Catherine Birch	Staunton	19	Miss Bristol	Classical Ballet			Married magician, John A. Daniel
1959	Alice Sue Williams	Richmond	19	Miss Williamsburg	Dramatization of Designing & Sewing Fashions		Non-finalist Talent Award	
1958	Barbara Guthrie	Martinsville		Miss Martinsville	Drama			
1957	Rebecca Lee Edmunds	Roanoke		Miss Roanoke Valley	Dance			
1956	Rebecca Richardson	Martinsville		Miss Martinsville	Art Display & Piano		Non-finalist Talent Award	
1955	Betty Sue Mathews	Norfolk		Miss Virginia Beach	Vocal, "There's No Business Like Show Business"			
1954	Julie Ann Bruening	Swoope		Miss Staunton-Augusta County	Charcoal Sketch of The Statue of Liberty			
1953	Anne Lee Ceglis	Norfolk			Classical Vocal, "Un Bel Di" from Madama Butterfly	2nd runner-up	Preliminary Talent Award	
1952	Edna Frances Long	Richmond	18		Dance			
1951	Shirley Louise Bryant	Norfolk	21		Vocal			
1950	Gloria Cherie Fenderson	Petersburg	18					
1949	Betty Ballard Lewis	Norfolk	22		Vocal			
1948	Bobby Joe Wilson	Hillsville						
1947	Ruth Ellen Mears	Cape Charles			Speech			
1946	Bette Cannon	Alexandria			Monologue, "The Waltz" by Dorothy Parker			
1945	No Virginia representative at Miss America pageant							
1944	No Virginia representative at Miss America pageant							
1943	Dorothy Taylor	Richmond		Miss Richmond				Competed under local title at Miss America pageant
1942	Charlotte Mae Smith	Fredericksburg						
1941	Jacquelyn McWin	Waynesboro				Top 15		
1940	Virginia Campbell	Charlottesville						
1939	Rose Marie Elliott	Suffolk			Vocal, "Smoke Gets in Your Eyes"	4th runner-up		
1938	Kathleen Mann	North Arlington						
1937	Frances Lee Sultan	Kecoughtan				Top 16		
1936	Dolores Taylor	Ocean View		Miss Virginia		Top 15		Contestants competed under local title at Miss America pageant
1936	Mary Virginia Ash	Phoebus		Miss Virginia Peninsula				Contestants competed under local title at Miss America pageant
1935	No Virginia representative at Miss America pageant							
1934	No national pageant was held							
1933	Evangeline Glidewell	Danville	17	Miss Danville	N/A	3rd runner-up		
1932	No national pageants were held							
1931	No national pageants were held							
1930	No national pageants were held							
1929	No national pageants were held							
1928	No national pageants were held							
1927	No Virginia representative at Miss America pageant							
1926	Eleanor V. Reid			Miss Norfolk	N/A	Top 15		Competed under local title at national pageant
1925	Dorothea Prince			Miss Norfolk	N/A			Competed under local title at national pageant
1924	No Virginia representative at Miss America pageant							
1923	Billie Gates	Richmond		Miss Richmond	N/A			Competed under local title at national pageant
1922	No Virginia representative at Miss America pageant							
1921	No Virginia representative at Miss America pageant							
