= Miss America 2019 =

92nd edition of the Miss America competition

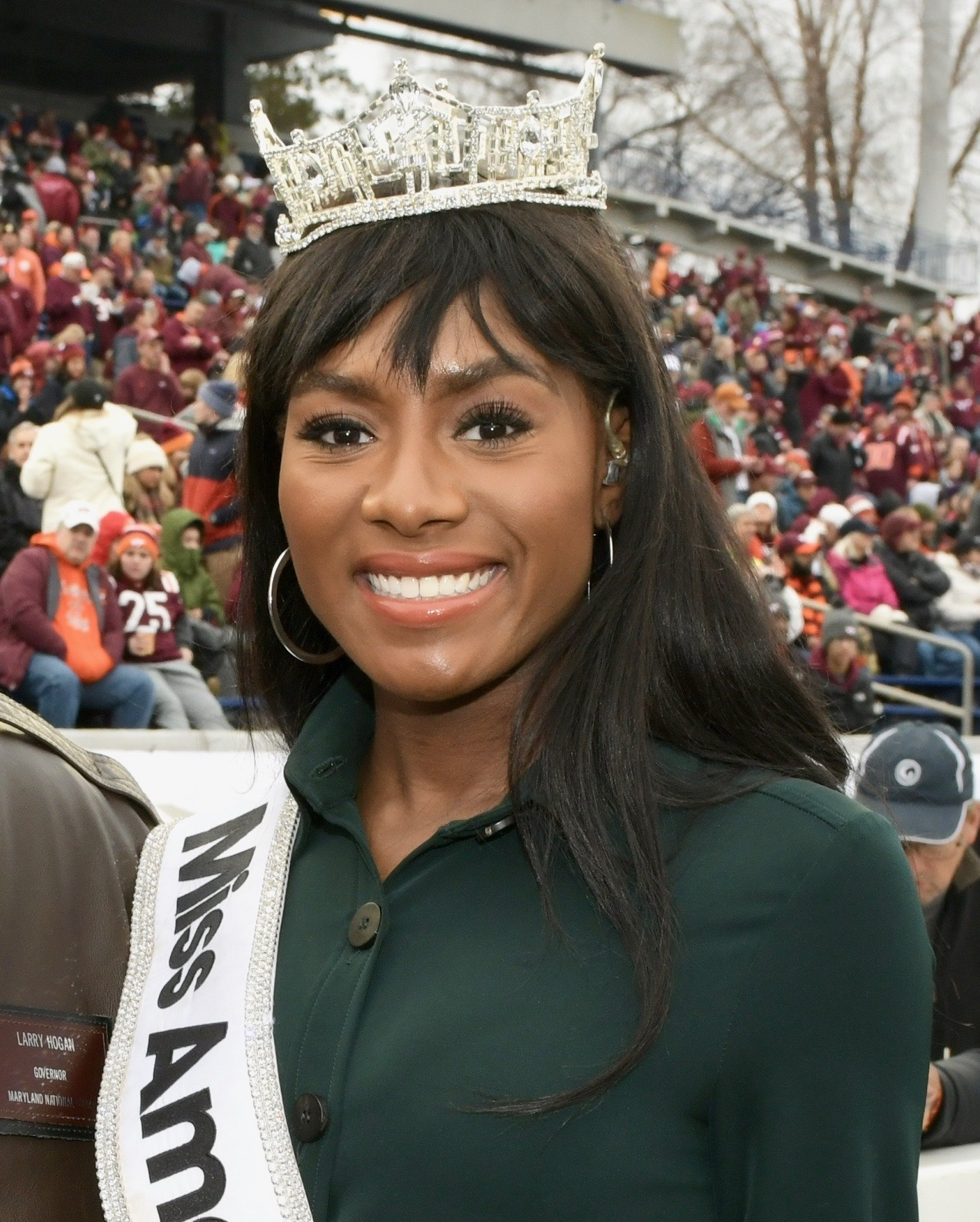
- Franklin at the 2018 Military Bowl
- Date: September 9, 2018
- Presenters: Carrie Ann Inaba; Ross Mathews
- Venue: Boardwalk Hall, Atlantic City, New Jersey
- Broadcaster: ABC
- Entrants: 51
- Placements: 15
- Winner: Nia Franklin; New York state

Miss America 2019, the 92nd Miss America pageant, though the Miss America Organization celebrated its 98th anniversary in 2018. This discrepancy is due to national pageants not being held from 1928 to 1932 or in 1934 because of financial problems associated with the Great Depression. The 2019 competition was held in Atlantic City, New Jersey. On May 23, 2018, it was announced that the pageant would air live on ABC on Sunday, September 9, 2018. This was the last Miss America to be aired on ABC before it was moved to NBC beginning from the 2020 pageant.

At the end of the event, Miss America 2018, Cara Mund of North Dakota, officially crowned her successor, Nia Franklin of New York, as Miss America 2019.

== Overview ==
=== Miss America 2.0 / Changes to competition and judging criteria ===
On June 5, 2018, it was announced that Miss America contestants would no longer be judged based on their physical appearance and that the national Miss America event would be considered a competition, rather than a pageant, and the titleholders now candidates, rather than contestants. The swimsuit competition was replaced with state titleholders participating in a live interactive session with the judges, "to highlight her achievements and goals in life and how she will use her talents, passion, and ambition to perform the job of Miss America."

The red carpet, formerly evening gown, competition allowed contestants to choose clothing, "that makes them feel confident, expresses their personal style, and shows how they hope to advance the role of Miss America." In interviews, Gretchen Carlson, the chair of the Board of Trustees of the Miss America Organization, emphasized the organization's desire to be more welcoming, "open, transparent, [and] inclusive to women," and to prioritize displaying the talent and scholarship in the contestants. These changes were announced by Carlson and the Miss America Organization after numerous titleholders were crowned after competing in state pageants with swimsuit competitions.

At the time the Miss America 2019 competition began, 46 of 51 state organizations (as well as 23 former Miss America winners) had signed a petition calling for the resignation of Carlson and CEO, Regina Hopper, from the Miss America Organization. The states who had not signed were Arkansas, Kentucky, Minnesota, Nevada, and Vermont.

==== Organization of competition ====
The preliminary competition consisted of private interviews, "red carpet" evening wear, an on-stage interview, and talent competitions. The private interview is a ten-minute session during which the candidate answers questions from the panel of preliminary judges which took place on September 4 and 5. The interview accounts for 20% of each titleholder's preliminary score. The "red carpet" evening wear competition (making up 15% of preliminary scores) consists of candidates walking down a literal red carpet and then being given 8 seconds to answer rapid fire questions relevant to their "social impact initiative", formerly referred to as a platform. The on stage interview preliminary award is replacing the lifestyle and fitness (swimsuit) preliminary award which was awarded at every Miss America pageant from 1940 to 2018. This interview portion of the competition makes up 15% of the preliminary score and consists of each candidate being asked a question by the judges and then having 20 seconds to answer. Scores from the preliminary competition determines the top 15 finalists who went on to compete on the televised final night of competition.

For the final night of competition, the top 15 candidates were selected based on their scores from the preliminary competition, which accounted for 25% of their final night score. The top 15 were first scored by the final night judges in an onstage interview with questions written by fellow finalists (termed "peer-to-peer questions"), accounting for 25% of their final night score and with ten contestants advancing. The top ten competed in the "red carpet" evening wear portion of the competition, contributing 20% of their scores. No candidates were eliminated after evening wear, and all top 10 performed their talent, serving as 30% of their total score. The total scores after these phases of competition determined the top 5 contestants. Each remaining candidate then drew a number to select a judge and had 20 seconds to answer that judge's assigned question; the scores from these questions then determined the winner of the competition and the placement of the other finalists.

=== Judges ===
==== Preliminary judges ====
On September 4–7, 2018, judges for the preliminary competition selected winners of the preliminary competitions as well as the top 15 finalists for the final night of competition on September 9, 2018. The panel included president and founder of Tragedy Assistance Program for Survivors, Bonnie Carroll; arts and education executive, Courtney Blackwell Burton; Emmy Award-winning hair designer and stylist, Bobby H. Grayson; musician, J'Anna Jacoby; managing editor of The Root, Lyne Pitts; TV host and New York Times bestselling author, Nancy Redd; and entrepreneur, Bill Townsend.

==== Final night judges ====
The panel of judges on the final night of competition on September 9, 2018 included professional boxer, Laila Ali; radio host, Bobby Bones; Grammy-winning producer and musician, Randy Jackson; country singer and TV personality, Jessie James Decker; TV journalist, Soledad O'Brien; entrepreneur and podcast host, Alli Webb; and singer/songwriter, Carnie Wilson.

== Results ==
=== Placements ===
Placement	Contestant
Miss America 2019	Nia Franklin (New York)
1st Runner-Up	Bridget Oei (Connecticut)
2nd Runner-Up	Holli' Conway (Louisiana)
3rd Runner-Up	Taylor Tyson (Florida)
4th Runner-Up	Gabriela Taveras (Massachusetts)
Top 10	Callie Walker (Alabama); Ellery Jones (Colorado); Allison Farris (District of Columbia); Nina Forest (Idaho); Jessica Shultis (Nebraska)
Top 15	Lydia Tremaine (Indiana); Michaelene Karlen (Minnesota); Ashley Thompson (Oklahoma); Danamarie McNicholl (Washington); Tianna Vanderhei (Wisconsin)

=== Awards ===
==== Preliminary awards ====
Awards	Contestants
On Stage Interview	Massachusetts – Gabriela Taveras; Virginia – Emili McPhail; Wisconsin – Tianna Vanderhei
Talent	Florida – Taylor Tyson; Indiana – Lydia Tremaine; Louisiana – Holli' Conway

==== Quality of Life awards ====
Results	Contestant	Platform
Winner	Arkansas – Claudia Raffo	New Life Saves Lives: Umbilical Cord Donation
1st runner-up	Maryland – Adrianna David	The Kidney Project
2nd runner-up	Mississippi – Asya Branch	Finding Your Way: Empowering Children of Incarcerated Parents
Finalists
Finalists	District of Columbia – Allison Farris	Women in Technology
Finalists	Georgia – Annie Jorgenson	Patch of Confidence #IGotThis
Finalists	New Jersey – Jaime Gialloreto	Don't Get Nutty: Food Allergy Awareness
Finalists	Tennessee – Christine Williamson	Alzheimer's Awareness: Fundraising, Advocating, and Providing Hope

==== Children's Miracle Network (CMN) National Miracle Maker awards ====
Results	Contestant
Winner	South Carolina – Davia Bunch
1st runner-up	Kansas – Hannah Klaassen
2nd runner-up	Alabama – Callie Walker

==== STEM Scholarship awards ====
Results	Contestant
Winners	Massachusetts – Gabriela Taveras; Montana – Laura Haller; Nevada – Alexis Hilts
Finalists	New Hampshire – Marisa Moorhouse; Vermont – Julia Crane

==== Women in Business Scholarship awards ====
Results	Contestant
Winners	Hawaii – Penelope Ng Pack; South Dakota – Carrie Wintle
Finalists	Nebraska – Jessica Shultis; Tennessee – Christine Williamson

==== Other awards ====
Awards	Contestant(s)
Miss Congeniality	Vermont – Julia Crane
Non-finalist Talent Awards	Hawaii – Penelope Ng Pack; Montana – Laura Haller; Texas – Madison Fuller; Utah – Jesse Craig
People's Choice Award	Massachusetts – Gabriela Taveras

== Candidates ==
The Miss America 2019 candidates were:

State or district	Name
Alabama	Callie Walker
Alaska	Courtney Schuman
Arizona	Isabel Ticlo
Arkansas	Claudia Raffo
California	MacKenzie Freed
Colorado	Ellery Jones
Connecticut	Bridget Oei
Delaware	Joanna Wicks
District of Columbia	Allison Farris
Florida	Taylor Tyson
Georgia	Annie Jorgensen
Hawaii	Penelope Ng Pack
Idaho	Nina Forest
Illinois	Grace Khachaturian
Indiana	Lydia Tremaine
Iowa	Mikhayla Hughes-Shaw
Kansas	Hannah Klaassen
Kentucky	Katie Bouchard
Louisiana	Holli' Conway
Maine	Olivia Mayo
Maryland	Adrianna David
Massachusetts	Gabriela Taveras
Michigan	Emily Sioma
Minnesota	Michaelene Karlen
Mississippi	Asya Branch
Missouri	Katelyn Lewis
Montana	Laura Haller
Nebraska	Jessica Shultis
Nevada	Alexis Hilts
New Hampshire	Marisa Moorhouse
New Jersey	Jaime Gialloreto
New Mexico	Ashley Fresquez
New York	Nia Franklin
North Carolina	Laura Matrazzo
North Dakota	Katie Olson
Ohio	Matti-Lynn Chrisman
Oklahoma	Ashley Thompson
Oregon	Taylor Ballard
Pennsylvania	Kayla Repasky
Rhode Island	Alexandra Coppa
South Carolina	Davia Bunch
South Dakota	Carrie Wintle
Tennessee	Christine Williamson
Texas	Madison Fuller
Utah	Jesse Craig
Vermont	Julia Crane
Virginia	Emili McPhail
Washington	Danamarie McNicholl
West Virginia	Madeline Collins
Wisconsin	Tianna Vanderhei
Wyoming	Beck Bridger
