= Courtney Garrett =

American beauty pageant titleholder

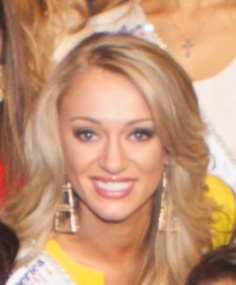
- Born: Courtney Paige Garrett; August 14, 1992 (age 34); Pamplin City, Virginia, U.S.
- Education: Liberty University
- Height: 5 ft (1.5 m)
- Beauty pageant titleholder
- Title: Little Miss State Fair of Virginia 1998; Miss Central Virginia's Outstanding Teen 2009; Miss Virginia's Outstanding Teen 2009; Miss Lynchburg 2011; Miss Arlington 2012; Miss Lynchburg 2013; Miss State Fair of Virginia 2014; Miss Virginia 2014
- Hair color: Blonde
- Major competitions: Miss America's Outstanding Teen 2010 (top 10); Miss America 2015 (first runner-up)

Courtney Paige Garrett (born August 14, 1992) is an American beauty pageant titleholder from Pamplin City, Virginia, who was chosen as Miss Virginia's Outstanding Teen 2009 and crowned Miss Virginia 2014. She competed for the Miss America 2015 title in September 2014 and was named first runner-up.

== Pageant career ==
=== Early pageants ===
Garrett began competing in beauty pageants when she was three years old. Her first competition was for Tiny Miss Appomattox in 1996. Among her childhood achievements, Garrett was crowned Little Miss State Fair of Virginia 1998.

Garrett was crowned Miss Central Virginia's Outstanding Teen 2009 and went on to win the statewide Miss Virginia's Outstanding Teen 2009 title. Trying for the national crown, Garrett placed in the top 10 at Miss America's Outstanding Teen 2010.

=== Vying for Miss Virginia ===
Competing as an adult, Garrett won the Miss Lynchburg 2011 title on January 29, 2011. She competed in the 2011 Miss Virginia pageant with the platform "C.A.R.E. – Communication and Respect for Everyone" which promoted respect for individuals with handicaps plus a vocal performance of "Over the Rainbow" in the talent portion of the competition. She was named first runner-up to winner Elizabeth Crot.

In December 2011, Garrett won the Miss Arlington 2012 title. She competed in the 2012 Miss Virginia pageant with the platform "Defying Disabilities" and a vocal performance of a Martina McBride song in the talent portion of the competition. She was named third runner-up to winner Rosemary Willis.

On February 16, 2013, Garrett won the Miss Lynchburg 2013 title. She competed in the 2013 Miss Virginia pageant with the platform "Defying Disabilities" and a vocal performance of "Caruso" by Lucio Dalla in the talent portion of the competition. She was named second runner-up to winner Desiree Williams.

=== Miss Virginia 2014 ===
On September 28, 2013, Garrett was crowned Miss State Fair of Virginia 2014. She entered the Miss Virginia pageant at the Roanoke Civic Center in June 2014 as one of 26 qualifiers for the state title. Garrett's competition talent was a vocal performance of "Parla Più Piano", an Italian language version of the love theme from The Godfather. Her platform was "Defying Disabilities", focused on understanding the challenges of people with physical challenges.

Garrett won the competition on Saturday, June 28, 2014, when she received her crown from outgoing Miss Virginia titleholder Desiree Williams. She earned more than $17,500 in scholarship money and other prizes from the state pageant. As Miss Virginia, her activities include public appearances across the state of Virginia.

=== Vying for Miss America ===
Garrett was Virginia's representative at the Miss America 2015 pageant in Atlantic City, New Jersey, in September 2014. She was the first runner-up to Miss New York Kira Kazantsev for the national title and would have taken over as Miss America if anything had interrupted her reign. Garrett earned a $25,000 scholarship prize as first runner-up.

== Early life and education ==
Garrett is a native of Pamplin City, Virginia, and a 2010 graduate of Prince Edward County High School in Farmville, Virginia. Her father is Steven Garrett, and her mother is Jeanine Garrett. Garrett has two younger brothers, Austin and Ryan. She and Austin, who has cerebral palsy, appeared together on a Wheaties box commemorating the 2014 Special Olympics World Games.

Garrett is a May 2014 graduate of Liberty University.

As of 2016 Garret was enrolled at Liberty University's School of Law and with plans to graduate in May 2018.

Awards and achievements
Preceded by Desiree Williams	Miss Virginia; 2014	Succeeded by Savannah Lane
Preceded by Lexie Overholt	Miss Virginia's Outstanding Teen; 2009	Succeeded by Courtney Jamison
