= Dmitri Young =

American baseball player (born 1973)

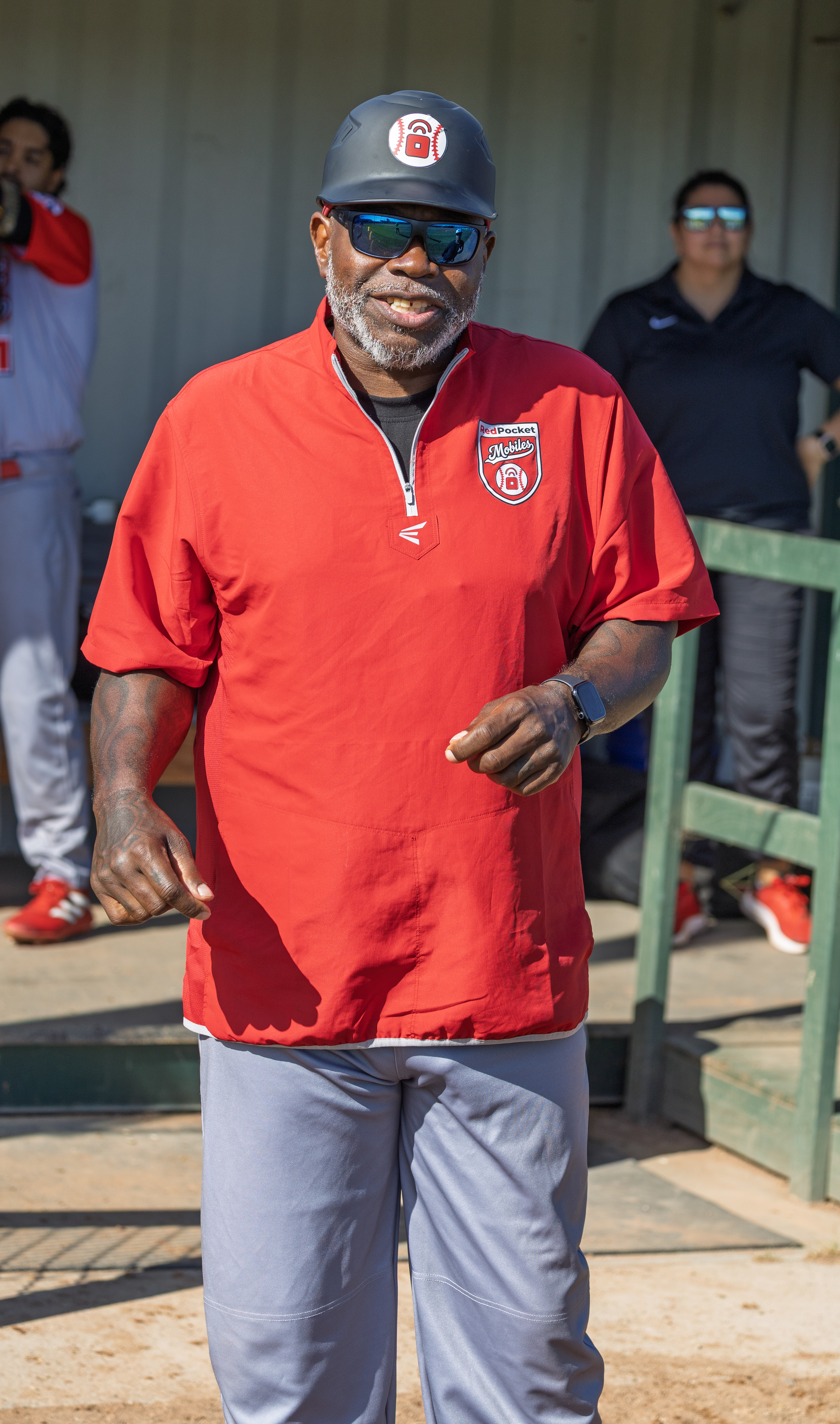
- Young managing the RedPocket Mobiles in 2026

RedPocket Mobiles
- First baseman / Left fielder / Designated hitter
- Born: October 11, 1973 (age 53); Vicksburg, Mississippi, U.S.
- Batted: Switch Threw: Right

MLB debut
- August 29, 1996, for the St. Louis Cardinals

Last MLB appearance
- July 11, 2008, for the Washington Nationals

MLB statistics
- Batting average: .292
- Home runs: 171
- Runs batted in: 683
- Stats at Baseball Reference

Teams
- St. Louis Cardinals (1996–1997); Cincinnati Reds (1998–2001); Detroit Tigers (2002–2006); Washington Nationals (2007–2008)

Career highlights and awards
- 2× All-Star (2003, 2007); NL Comeback Player of the Year (2007)

Dmitri Dell Young (born October 11, 1973) is an American former professional baseball player. He played all or parts of 13 seasons in Major League Baseball (MLB) as a left fielder, first baseman, and designated hitter, for the St. Louis Cardinals, Cincinnati Reds, Detroit Tigers, and Washington Nationals from 1996 through 2008. He is a two-time All-Star and winner of the National League Comeback Player of the Year Award. His younger brother, Delmon Young, also played in MLB.

== High school career ==
Young attended Rio Mesa High School in Oxnard, California. He never hit below a .400 batting average while playing in high school and earned USA Today High School All-American honors in his senior season.

Young initially committed to play college baseball for the Miami Hurricanes.

== Minor leagues ==
The St. Louis Cardinals selected Young in the first round, with the fourth overall selection, in the 1991 Major League Baseball draft. Early in his professional career, Young's weight raised concerns. In 1994, a Cardinals farm director told the Los Angeles Times that the organization worried he might "eat himself out a major league career." At the time, he weighed 240 pounds (110 kg).

In 1995, Young punched a fan who had been heckling him and calling him racial slurs, which earned him a suspension from the Texas League.

Finally, in 1996, he had a big year at Triple-A Louisville, batting .333, being chosen as a Triple-A All-Star first baseman and the St. Louis Cardinals Minor League Player of the Year. He was called up at the end of the season and played a few games with St. Louis in the majors.

== Major league career ==
=== Cardinals and Reds: 1996–2001 ===
Young's first full season in Major League Baseball was with the Cardinals in 1997, in which he hit .258. After the season, he was traded to the Cincinnati Reds for Jeff Brantley. Eight days later, he was selected by the Tampa Bay Devil Rays in the expansion draft, then traded back to the Reds for Mike Kelly. While with the Reds, Young hit over .300 in each year (finishing second in doubles in 1998, and hitting 21 home runs in 2001). During those years, he played primarily the outfield and at first base.

=== Tigers: 2002–06 ===
After the 2001 season, he was traded by the Reds to the Detroit Tigers for Luis Pineda and Juan Encarnación. In 2003, he hit .297, with 29 home runs, and 7 triples (10th in the league). He was the Tigers' lone representative at the 2003 MLB All-Star Game, although he did not make an appearance on the field or in the batter's box.

On May 6, 2003, Young went 5–5 against the Baltimore Orioles hitting two homers and two triples, and a single. When he came up to bat in the ninth, he was a double short of the cycle. Instead, he hit his second triple of the night off Buddy Groom. "It crossed my mind, but since the game was close, my individual accomplishment took a back seat," Young said. "The run is the important thing."

On April 4, 2005, Young joined George Bell and Tuffy Rhodes as the only players to hit three home runs on Opening Day in Detroit's 11–2 win over the visiting Kansas City Royals. Young, along with Tigers first baseman Miguel Cabrera, former Royals Designated Hitter Kendrys Morales, and Mariners third baseman Kyle Seager, are the only players to hit three home runs in one game at Comerica Park—one of the more difficult home run stadiums. He was also known as "Da Meat Hook" and "The Big D" to Tigers fans.

Young appeared at World Wrestling Entertainment (WWE)'s Survivor Series 2005 in an interview segment with Edge and Lita. Edge made fun of the Detroit Tigers, saying that they sucked, while Young cracked jokes at Edge concerning his failures on capturing a World Title.

==== 2006 ====
In 2006, Young went through a divorce, and was treated for alcohol and substance abuse and depression. He pleaded guilty to assault after an argument in Birmingham, Michigan.

On May 17, 2006, the Detroit Free Press reported that Young faced a misdemeanor domestic violence charge. Young subsequently voluntarily spent 30 days in a rehabilitation facility, Promises Malibu, and three weeks working out with minor league teams. On June 13, 2006, Young failed to appear for a pretrial hearing on this matter and a bench warrant was issued for his arrest. Ten days later, he pleaded no contest to the domestic violence charges.

On June 30, 2006, Young revealed that he had been battling several illnesses that resulted in him self-medicating with alcohol, which limited his physical fitness and kept him from appearing in all but a small fraction of Tigers games during the season. He made a statement to the press in which he asserted that he had been making progress overcoming it with the help of Alcoholics Anonymous, whose logo has been tattooed on his hand as a gesture of thanks. He returned to action on July 21, 2006, versus the Oakland Athletics, starting at designated hitter and ending the game with two hits and 2 runs batted in during the Tigers' 7–4 win. Before the game started, FSN Detroit aired a video of Young apologizing to the fans and saying how he will continue to struggle against alcohol and drugs for the rest of his life.

On September 6, 2006, with less than a month to go in their American League Championship season, the Tigers gave Young his unconditional release in a move that surprised both teammates and fans alike.

The day after Thanksgiving, an ambulance took him to a hospital, where he endured a three-day stay in the intensive care unit as his doctors diagnosed diabetes. Since then, Young has taken steps to get his diabetes in control and is encouraging others to do so. He has recently appeared on dLife to talk to people about how he has lived with diabetes.

=== Nationals: 2006–07 ===
In late 2006, the Washington Nationals lost their first baseman Nick Johnson for nearly a year due to a broken leg. The following spring, the Nationals invited a number of first basemen to camp, including Young, who won the starting role. In his first game with the Nationals, on opening day, he hit two doubles. He went on to have a sizzling first half, reaching the All-Star break batting .340, third in the league, and he was selected to his second All-Star game—the Nationals' only representative. He singled in his only at-bat with two outs in the bottom of the ninth and scored on an Alfonso Soriano home run.

Young received his Detroit Tigers 2006 American League Championship ring when the Tigers played the Nationals in an interleague series at RFK Stadium in June 2007.

On July 4, Young hit a grand slam against the visiting Chicago Cubs. It was his sixth career grand slam. He finished the year batting .320, the highest of his career, and ninth in the National League. Towards the end of the month, Young signed a two-year, $10 million extension with a vesting option. Upon the season's close, Young won the Player's Choice National League Comeback Player of the Year award.

On March 29, 2008, the Nationals confirmed that Johnson would open the season as their starting first baseman over Young, although on June 24, 2008, the Nationals announced that Johnson would have season-ending wrist surgery and named Young as the starting first baseman. On September 17, Young was declared officially out for the season due to his diabetes.

=== 2010–Retirement ===
After spending the 2009 season in the minor leagues, Young announced his retirement on March 18, 2010. On the same day, he was introduced as the Vice President and Senior Advisor of Baseball Operations and Special Hitting and Fielding Instructor of the Oakland County Cruisers minor league baseball team. After the 2011 season, Young announced he was attempting a comeback, but was not signed by any team.

== Post-retirement life ==
Young began collecting baseball cards in 2000 when he and Reds teammate Danny Graves were offered $2,000 to appear at a card show. Young saw a Pete Rose rookie card and asked for it in lieu of the cash payment. In 2002, Tigers teammate Robert Fick introduced Young to Dave Bailey, a memorabilia collector, and the two eventually amassed perhaps the greatest collection of rookie cards in the world. He estimated that he spent $5 million of the $52 million he earned as a baseball player on his card collection.

In 2010–11, Young co-hosted Card Corner Club Radio, a weekly sports card and collectibles show.

In 2012, Young put nearly 500 of the mint condition rookie cards up for auction with plans to use the proceeds to open a baseball school and nonprofit foundation in Ventura County, California. The cards were auctioned individually and the collection ultimately fetched $2.4 million in total (equivalent to $3.37 million in 2025). His 1955 Topps Roberto Clemente card fetched the highest price, setting a post-World War II record by selling for $432,690 (equivalent to $606,795 in 2025). Overall, six different cards in the collection sold for six figures.

At his heaviest during his playing career, Young weighed 295 pounds (134 kg) and was the third-heaviest player in MLB history. As of July 2014, he had lost more than 100 pounds (45 kg) from his peak weight.

Dmitri is currently the President of The Dmitri D. Young Foundation, Inc., a non-profit organization providing baseball and life choices camps for student athletes in Southern California, in particular in Ventura County and with this alma mater, Rio Mesa High School. His foundation is awaiting IRS section 501(c)(3) status.

In August 2020, Young was named the head baseball coach at Adolfo Camarillo High School in Camarillo, California.

In February 2025, Young was named manager of the Northern Colorado Owlz, a member of the independent Pioneer League based in Windsor, Colorado.

== Personal life ==
Dmitri's younger brother is Delmon Young, the first overall draft pick in the 2003 Major League Baseball draft and runner-up for the 2007 American League Rookie of the Year Award. Delmon made his major league debut on August 29, 2006, exactly ten years after his older brother.

Young's sister, DeAnn, played college softball for the Oregon State Beavers. His nephew, Quentin Young, is a prospect in the 2025 MLB draft.

Dmitri and Delmon's father, Larry Young, from Mississippi, was one of the United States Navy's first African American F-14 fighter pilots. He later worked as a pilot for Delta Air Lines.

On July 6, 2010, Young was arrested at the Central Illinois Regional Airport on charges of possession drug paraphernalia and marijuana in Bloomington, Illinois.
