= Katelynne Cox =

American singer and model (born 1994)

Katelynne Staehnke
- Born: Katelynne Goldie Sue Cox; June 28, 1994 (age 32)
- Education: Clark College, University of Missouri, Oregon State University
- Occupations: Singer, model

Katelynne Goldie Sue Staehnke (née Cox; born June 28, 1994) is an American singer, model and former pageant competitor. She has released two EPs, Unbelievable (2008) and Erase It (2014), and a studio album, One Girl (2011). Staehnke represented the Miss District of Columbia organization at Miss America 2020.

== Biography ==
Katelynne Staehnke was born on June 28, 1994, to Cameron Cox and Wendy Sturm, and grew up in Camas, Washington. Staehnke began competing in modeling competitions when she was seven, winning numerous state and national titles, including Miniature Miss Washington and Miss Washington Jr. Pre-teen. In 2009, she won the Miss American Teen Jr title at the National Miss American Coed Pageant. In 2008, at the age of fourteen, she launched her music career with the EP Unbelievable. In 2010 she appeared in two editions of Supermodels Unlimited, the second of which featured her on the cover.

The recording process for her album, which would be titled One Girl, took place in Nashville. The album was released in 2011 through Red Hammer Records. In 2014, Staehnke released a second EP, Erase It, independently. From 2012 through 2014, Staehnke worked as a news anchor and producer at KOMU-TV.

From August 2015 to October 2021, she worked at the United States Chamber of Commerce, a business-oriented lobbying firm. She also worked for the Sports & Entertainment Network as an anchor and analyst. In 2016, Staehnke competed in Miss District of Columbia, Staehnke was part of the Washington Capitals' cheerleading team, the Red Rockers, from 2017 through 2019. In 2019, her final year of eligibility, Staehnke won the Miss District of Columbia title. At the Miss America 2020 contest, Staehnke was a finalist for the Women in Business Scholarship awards. On July 16, 2022, she married Benjamin Staehnke.

== Education ==
Staehnke attended Mountain View High School in Vancouver, WA and at the age fifteen was awarded a full scholarship to Clark College. She graduated both Clark College and Mountain View High School in 2012. During 2011 she also studied engineering at Vanderbilt University. After obtaining her Associate degree, she attended the University of Missouri, studying communications and political science and graduating in 2014 with a Bachelor's in Interdisciplinary Studies. She went on to complete two graduate certificates at the University of Missouri in Public Affairs Management and Nonprofit Management. In 2021, she graduated with a Master's of Business Administration from Oregon State University.

== Discography ==
- Unbelievable – 2008
- One Girl – 2011
- Erase It – 2014

Awards and achievements
Preceded by Allison Farris	Miss District of Columbia; 2019—2021	Succeeded by Andolyn Medina
