= Red Hammer Records =

- Founded: 2006
- Founder: Darren Bowls
- Distributor: Entertainment One Distribution
- Genre: Rock, pop, contemporary Christian
- Country of origin: United States
- Location: Battle Ground, Washington
- Official website: redhammerrecords.com

Red Hammer Records is an independent record label located in the Portland, Oregon metro area of Battle Ground, Washington. The label was founded in 2006 and is distributed in the United States and digitally throughout the world by Entertainment One Distribution.

== History ==
Red Hammer Records was formed by Darren Bowls in 2006 with the signing of Portland, Oregon metro area band SONSOFDAY, whose 2007 national release garnered critical attention and a Gospel Music Channel video of the year award for the video single "This Place." 2008 started with a bang with the signing of Norwegian bands Dreampilots and Humming People, and the Portland electro-pop group Paper Rings. 2008 saw the limited release of Paper Rings first CD and follow up mid-west tour opening for SONSOFDAY. 2009 brought the release of Humming People's first CD "A Hope No Man Can Bind" in Norway, and GMA "buzz band" Dreampilots much anticipated first US release Comedown. 2011 will see the debut national release from Katelynne Cox on March 22, 2011.

== Artists ==
=== Current ===
- Dreampilots
- Paper Rings
- Humming People
- Katelynne Cox

=== Additional and former ===
- Nick Matev
- Kate White
- Red Rain
- D.R. Gooya
- SONSOFDAY

== See also ==
- List of record labels
