= Scott Baker (journalist) =

American journalist (born 1964)

- Born: March 4, 1964 (age 62)
- Education: Wheaton College
- Occupations: Journalist, blogger, media executive
- Employer: WTAE
- Spouses: Ruth Ann Dailey; Nicole Johnson (m. 2003; div. 2008): Liz Stephans

William Scott Baker (born March 4, 1964) is an American political commentator and former television news anchor. He was an evening news anchor for thirteen years at WTAE-TV in Pittsburgh, Pennsylvania. He co-founded The Blaze, serving as editor-in-chief from 2010 to 2016. Scott Baker is the Chief Marketing Officer at CRA | Admired Leadership.

== Education ==
Baker obtained his degree in political science from Wheaton College. While attending Wheaton College, he became interested in broadcasting while working on political campaigns. In 1984, Baker worked full-time for the Reagan-Bush campaign. He was the state president of the Illinois College Republicans.

== Career ==
On August 31, 2010, Baker became managing editor of the online news and opinion website The Blaze. One of the site's co-founders, he was later appointed editor-in-chief. He left The Blaze in 2016. Previously, Baker worked for Voice of America (Washington, D.C.), CBS News (New York City), and at television stations in Erie, Pennsylvania, and Saginaw, Michigan, before becoming an evening news anchor for thirteen years at WTAE-TV in Pittsburgh, Pennsylvania.

For fifteen years, Baker taught a two-day seminar on broadcast journalism at the Leadership Institute in Arlington, Virginia.

== Personal life ==
In 2003, Baker married Miss America 1999 Nicole Johnson. The couple met in the mid-1990s at a seminar Baker held for college students interested in news careers. Johnson and Baker later divorced in 2008. He resides in Pittsburgh, Pennsylvania.

== See also ==
- GBTV
- Glenn Beck
