= DLife =

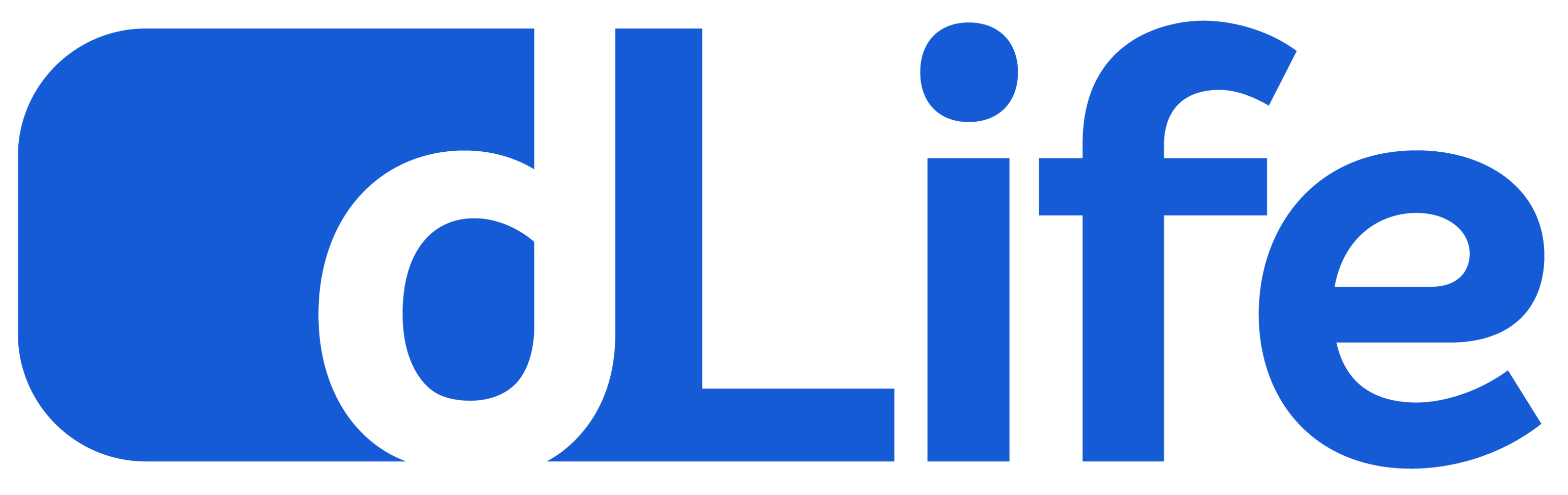
- Logo
- Also known as: dlife
- Presented by: Benno C. Schmidt III; Jim Turner
- Starring: See below
- Country of origin: United States
- Original language: English

Production
- Executive producers: Gary Cohen; Paula Ford-Martin; Tom Karlya; Howard Steinberg
- Producers: Roy McDonald; Bethann Brown
- Production location: New York City
- Editors: Roy McDonald; James Machado
- Production companies: LifeMed Media, Inc.

Original release
- Network: CNBC
- Release: 2005 – 2013

DLife (stylized as dLife) is a half-hour-long American weekly lifestyle television series broadcasting Sundays at 7 PM ET on CNBC. The show, which started airing in 2005, is the first television program dedicated entirely to people living with diabetes and the people who care for them. As of 2013, dLife TV is available online only and no longer appears on CNBC.

== Show format ==
dLife is anchored by Benno C. Schmidt III, a veteran network and local broadcast journalist and anchor, along with co-host Jim Turner, who both live with diabetes. Looking at diabetes as a lifestyle rather than a disease, dLife features a wide variety of segments which inspire and connect the diabetes community.

Regular segments include the dLife Kitchen, featuring a diabetes-friendly recipe with chef Michel Nischan, and Real People Real Stories, where viewers send in their personal stories about dealing with diabetes. In addition, there are segments discussing advancements in diabetes research, fitness and health and new diabetes products and therapies on the market. dLife also regularly has special guests, many of whom are celebrities in sports, politics or entertainment, who come on the show and discuss how they deal with diabetes.

== Celebrity appearances ==
Among the guests who have appeared are:

- Dmitri Young, Major League Baseball player
- Chris Matthews, host of Hardball with Chris Matthews
- Nick Jonas, lead singer/guitarist for the Jonas Brothers
- Jerry Mathers, actor (Leave it to Beaver)
- Delta Burke, actress (Designing Women), Miss Florida, Miss USA
- Jerry Stackhouse, NBA player, Dallas Mavericks
- Bill Brown, basketball coach
- Darren Brass, tattoo artist, star of Miami Ink
- Will Cross, mountain climber
- Mike Huckabee, Arkansas governor
- Gary Hall, Jr., Olympic swimmer
- Aida Turturro, actress (The Sopranos)
- Dorian Gregory, actor (Baywatch Nights, The Other Half, Charmed)
- Patti LaBelle, soul singer
- Don Francisco, host of Sábado Gigante
- Damon Dash, entrepreneur, co-founder of Roc-a-Fella Records
- Jason Johnson, Major League Baseball player
- Bret Michaels, singer, Poison
- Elaine Stritch, comedian, actress
- Ron Santo, former Major League Baseball player
- Phife Dawg, rapper, A Tribe Called Quest
- Joe Frazier, boxer
- B.B. King, blues musician
- Kevin Covais, American Idol contestant
