= Miss America 1999 =

72nd Miss America pageant

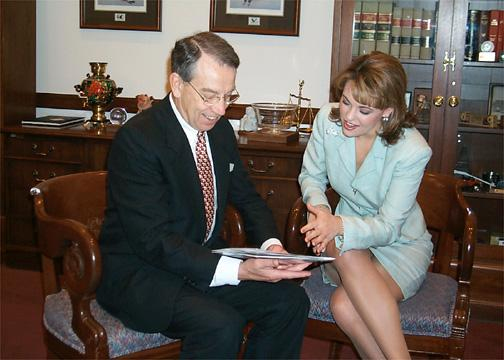
- Senator Chuck Grassley meets with Miss America 1999 Nicole Johnson
- Date: September 19, 1998
- Presenters: Boomer Esiason, Meredith Vieira
- Venue: Boardwalk Hall, Atlantic City, New Jersey
- Broadcaster: ABC
- Winner: Nicole Johnson; Virginia

Miss America 1999, the 72nd Miss America pageant, was held at the Boardwalk Hall in Atlantic City, New Jersey on Saturday, September 19, 1998, on ABC Network. Nicole Johnson of Virginia, who wore an insulin pump at her hip to deal with her diabetes, was crowned by outgoing Miss America Kate Shindle.

Miss Ohio Cheya Watkins, who did not make the top 10, had been the topic of an earlier controversy when the University of Cincinnati denied that she was a freshman there, as she claimed.

== Results ==
=== Placements ===
Final results	Contestant
Miss America 1999	Virginia - Nicole Johnson
1st runner-up	North Carolina - Kelli Bradshaw
2nd runner-up	Florida - Lissette Gonzalez
3rd runner-up	Missouri - Deborah McDonald
4th runner-up	Kentucky - Chera-Lyn Cook
Top 10	Alaska - Joslyn Tinker; Arkansas - Erin Wheatley; District of Columbia - Nicole Messina; Indiana - Julianne Hackney; Oklahoma - Julie Payne

== Judges ==
- Tawny Little
- Nora McAniff
- Debbi Morgan
- Nancy O'Dell
- Picabo Street
- Stephen Schwartz
- Ian Ziering
