= Miss Virginia's Teen =

Beauty pageant

- Miss Virginia's Teen
- Formation: 2003
- Type: Beauty pageant
- Location: Roanoke, Virginia
- Members: Miss America's Teen
- Official language: English
- Key people: Linda Haas
- Website: https://www.missvirginia.org/

The Miss Virginia's Teen competition, part of the Miss Virginia Opportunity, is the pageant that selects the representative for the Commonwealth of Virginia in the Miss America's Teen pageant.

To compete in the Miss Virginia's Teen pageant, a contestant must first win one of many local competitions. Contestants may compete at the local and state level more than once, but having won a state title may only compete in the national Miss America's Teen competition one time. The state pageant is held in Roanoke, Virginia at the Roanoke Civic Center in lateJune.

Caedyn Riddle of Rocky Mount was crowned Miss Virginia's Teen on June 27, 2026, at the Berglund Center in Roanoke, Virginia. She competed for the title of Miss America's Teen 2027 on September 5, 2026, at the Kravis Center for the Performing Arts in West Palm Beach, Florida.

== Results summary ==
The year in parentheses indicates the year of the Miss America's Outstanding Teen competition the award/placement was garnered.

=== Placements ===
- Miss America's Outstanding Teens: Caitlin Brunell (2008)
- 2nd runners-up: Brittany Young (2007), Emily Kinsey (2019)
- 3rd runners-up: Casey Shepard (2015)
- 4th runners-up: Courtney Jamison (2011), Cassandra (Cassie) Donegan (2014)
- Top 10: Lexie Overholt (2009), Courtney Garrett (2010), Andolyn Medina (2013)

=== Awards ===
==== Preliminary awards ====
- Preliminary Evening Wear/On Stage Question: Caitlin Brunell (2008), Courtney Jamison (2011), Andolyn Medina (2013)
- Preliminary Talent: Courtney Jamison (2011), Cassandra (Cassie) Donegan (2014)

==== Other awards ====
- Academic Achievement: Hayley Boland (2016)
- Outstanding Vocalist: Cassandra (Cassie) Donegan (2014)
- Outstanding Instrumentalist: Courtney Jamison (2011), Hayley Boland (2016)
- Teens in Action Award Winners: Andolyn Medina (2013)
- Teens in Action Award Finalists: Hayley Boland (2016), Morgan Rhudy (2020), Ayana Johnson (2023)

== Winners ==
Year	Name	Hometown	Age	Local title	Talent	Placement at MAO Teen	Special scholarships at MAO Teen	Notes
2026	Caedyn Riddle	Rocky Mount	16	Miss Commonwealth’s Teen	Musical Theater Vocal			
2025	Aryana Guest	Yorktown	15	Miss Commonwealth's Teen	Lyrical Dance			
2024	Cassidy Lee	Williamsburg	18	Miss Hampton-Newport News' Teen	Baton Dance			
2023	Addison Rhudy	Midlothian	16	Miss Greater Richmond's Teen	Musical Theater Routine			Younger sister of Miss Virginia's Outstanding Teen 2019/2020, Morgan Rhudy Later became Miss Virgina's Teen 2023 & Miss Virginia Teen Volunteer 2026
2022	Ayana Johnson	Chesapeake	15	Miss Roanoke Valley's Outstanding Teen	Musical Theater Dance		Teens in Action Finalist	
2021	Ella Strickland	Warrenton	18	Miss Commonwealth's Outstanding Teen	Broadway Vocal			
2019-20	Morgan Rhudy	Midlothian	17	Miss Dominion's Outstanding Teen	Vocal, "My Strongest Suit"		Teen in Action Award Finalist	Older sister of Miss Virginia's Outstanding Teen 2023 Addison Rhudy
2018	Emily Kinsey	Richmond	16	Miss Apple Blossom Festival's Outstanding Teen	Pointe Dance, "Friend Like Me"	2nd runner-up		
2017	Isabella Jessee	Roanoke	17	Miss Southwestern Virginia's Outstanding Teen	Violin, "The Devil Went Down to Georgia"			Previously Miss Teen Virginia International 2015; 4th runner-up at Miss Teen International 2016 pageant Miss Roanoke Valley 2022
2016	Emily Allara	Salem	14	Miss Roanoke Valley's Outstanding Teen	Dance			
2015	Hayley Boland	Troutville	17	Miss Roanoke Valley's Outstanding Teen	Piano, "Solfeggietto" by Carl Philipp Emanuel Bach		Academic Achievement Award Outstanding Instrumental Talent Award Teens in Action Award Finalist	
2014	Casey Shepard	Virginia Beach	15	Miss Apple Blossom's Outstanding Teen	Ballet en Pointe	3rd runner-up		
2013	Cassandra (Cassie) J. Donegan	Smithfield	14	Miss Greater Springfield's Outstanding Teen	Musical Theater Vocal, "The Girl in 14-G"	4th runner-up	Outstanding Vocalist Award Preliminary Talent Award	Later Miss New York Volunteer 2024, placed 2nd runner-up at Miss Volunteer America 2025 Assumed Miss New York 2025 title, and named Miss America 2026
2012	Andolyn Medina	Chesapeake	16	Miss Arlington's Outstanding Teen	Classical Vocal	Top 10	Preliminary Evening Wear/OSQ Award Teens in Action Award	1st runner-up at Miss District of Columbia 2019 competition Later District of Columbia Sweetheart 2019 3rd runner-up at National Sweetheart 2019 Later Miss District of Columbia 2021
2011	Dominick Fink	Chesapeake	15	Miss Greater Richmond's Outstanding Teen	Dance			Later Miss District of Columbia Teen USA 2014
2010	Courtney Jamison	Richmond	16	Miss Chesterfield's Outstanding Teen	Piano	4th runner-up	Outstanding Instrumentalist Award Preliminary Evening Wear/OSQ Award	Later National American Miss 2013-2014 1st runner-up at Miss Virginia 2015 pageant
2009	Courtney Garrett	Pamplin	17	Miss Central Virginia's Outstanding Teen	Vocal	Top 10		Later Miss Virginia 2014; 1st runner-up at Miss America 2015 pageant
2008	Lexie Overholt	Oakton			Ballet en Pointe	Top 10		Currently a member of corps de ballet at Miami City Ballet
2007	Hilary Moyler	Chesapeake			Vocal	N/A		Assumed title when Brunell was named Miss America's Outstanding Teen 2008
2007	Caitlin Brunell	Great Falls	15	Miss Greater Richmond's Outstanding Teen	En Pointe Dance, "Show Off" from The Drowsy Chaperone	Winner	Preliminary Evening Wear/OSQ Award	Daughter of former New Orleans Saints quarterback, Mark Brunell Later Miss Alabama 2014; Top 10 at Miss America 2015 pageant
2006	Brittany Young	Mechanicsville	17		Vocal	2nd runner-up		Daughter of Miss Virginia 1982, Beverly Cooke 4th runner-up at Miss Virginia 2011 pageant
2005	Elle Elizabeth Bunn	Virginia Beach	16		Vocal			
2004	Erika Uhlig	Earlysville	16			No national pageant		Later appeared as a contestant on The Bachelor
2003	Brittany Breen	Hampton	16			No national pageant		
