= Nia Franklin =

American classical composer (born 1993)

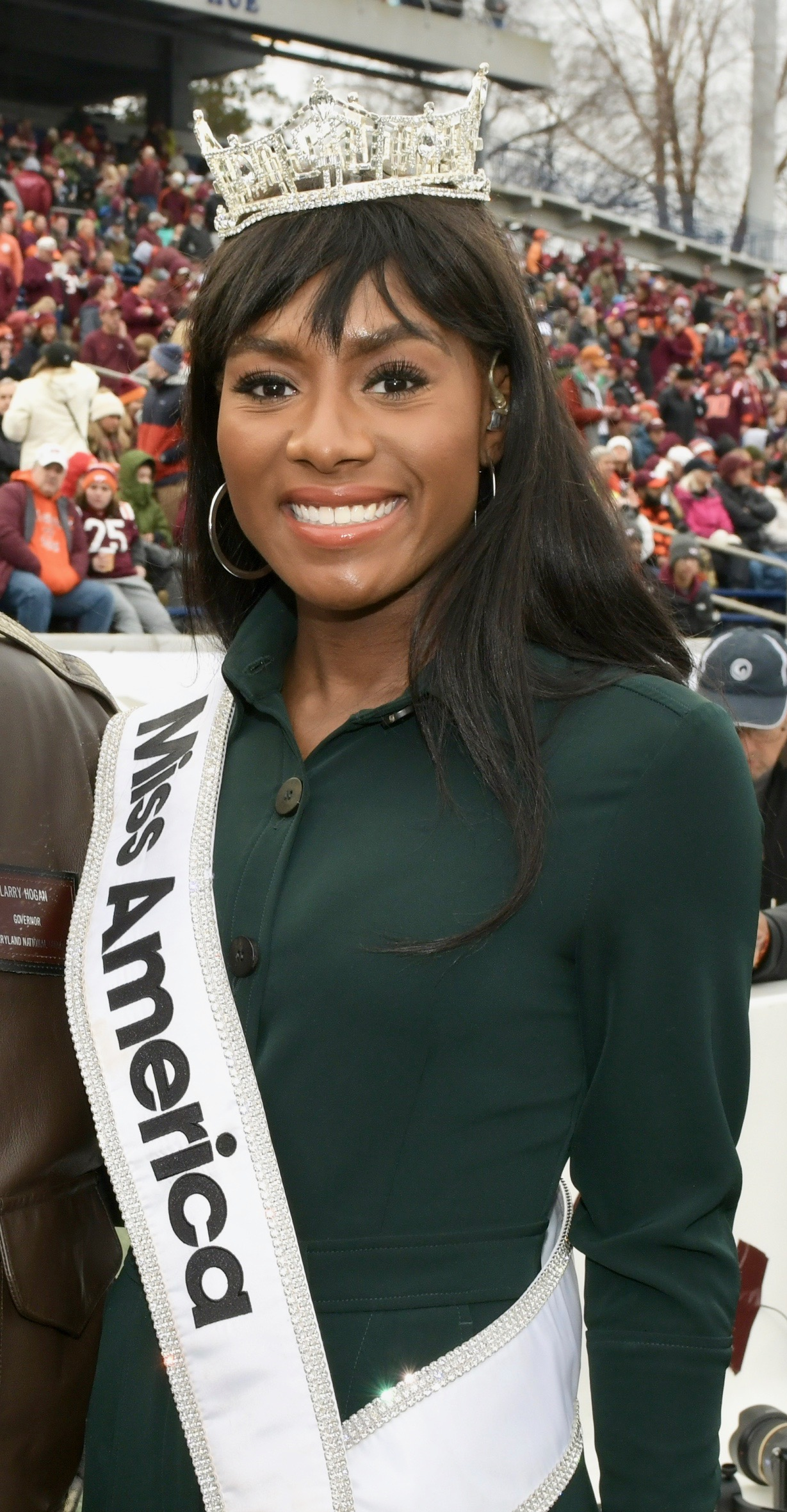
- Franklin at the 2018 Military Bowl
- Born: Nia Imani Franklin; July 27, 1993 (age 32); Winston-Salem, North Carolina, U.S.
- Education: East Carolina University (BM); University of North Carolina School of the Arts (MM)
- Height: 1.71 m (5 ft 7 in)
- Title: Miss Five Boroughs 2018; Miss New York 2018; Miss America 2019
- Term: September 9, 2018 – December 19, 2019
- Predecessor: Cara Mund
- Successor: Camille Schrier

Nia Imani Franklin (born July 27, 1993) is an American composer and beauty pageant titleholder. In June 2018, she was crowned Miss New York 2018. On September 9, 2018, she was crowned Miss America 2019 in Atlantic City, New Jersey, by the outgoing Miss America 2018, Cara Mund.

With her win, 2019 became the first year that all four major United States–based pageants were won by black women; other titleholders were Zozibini Tunzi of South Africa (as Miss Universe 2019), Kaliegh Garris (as Miss Teen USA 2019), and Cheslie Kryst (as Miss USA 2019).

== Early life and education ==
Franklin was born on July 27, 1993, the oldest daughter born to James and Kristy Franklin. She has younger siblings, sister Bailey and brother J.D.

Franklin graduated from North Davidson High School in Welcome, North Carolina, in 2011. She then attended East Carolina University in Greenville, North Carolina, and graduated with a degree in music composition in 2015. During her freshman year at East Carolina University, Franklin's father was diagnosed with non-Hodgkin lymphoma. Years later, her father relapsed twice and required a stem cell transplant. Franklin was found to be a match and then donated her stem cells, ultimately leading to her father's remission.

After graduating from East Carolina, she attended the University of North Carolina School of the Arts (UNCSA) and earned her master of music degree in 2017, also in music composition. She composed a chamber opera titled King Solomon that premiered in 2015. Franklin moved to New York City after being selected as a 2017 William R. Kenan Jr. fellow with the Lincoln Center for the Performing Arts' education division.

== Philanthropy and social activism ==
As a student at UNCSA, Franklin was a member of ArtistCorps, an AmeriCorps program that invites well-known artists into public schools and community centers to work with students with decreased access to arts programming. After relocating to New York, Franklin worked closely with Success Academy Charter Schools, founding a music club for students, and served as a cultural partner with the NYC-based non-profit organization, Sing For Hope.

== Pageantry ==
=== Early pageantry ===
While a student at East Carolina University, Franklin was crowned Miss Black and Gold at a scholarship pageant sponsored by the university's Alpha Phi Alpha fraternity. She also competed in the Miss North Carolina organization in 2016 and 2017. At both competitions, Franklin placed among the top 10 finalists and won the preliminary talent award.

=== Miss New York 2018 ===
In June 2018, Franklin competed as Miss Five Boroughs 2018 at the Miss New York 2018 pageant. She went on to win both talent and swimsuit preliminary awards, as well as the overall interview award. Ultimately, she was crowned Miss New York 2018 on June 30, 2018, at Shea's Theatre in Buffalo, New York.

=== Miss America 2019 ===
Franklin represented New York at the Miss America 2019 competition held at Boardwalk Hall in Atlantic City, New Jersey, on September 9, 2018, with a platform of "Advocating for the Arts."

For the talent portion, she sang "Quando m'en vò" from the opera La bohème. In the final round of the competition, Franklin was asked how being Miss New York prepared her for her being Miss America by judge Laila Ali. In the allotted 20 seconds, she told about how she had to move many times in New York and deal with high rent, and how she had to work hard in her life. She said, "I have New York grit. ... I came up on a Lincoln Center fellowship because I'm an artist, and I'm really excited to just share my platform my social impact advocating for the arts and make sure all students have access to a quality education.".

She bested first runner-up, Miss Connecticut 2018, Bridget Oei, for the 2019 Miss America title and was crowned by Miss America 2018, Cara Mund, on September 9, 2018. Along with the title of Miss America, Franklin also won a $50,000 scholarship. Franklin is the seventh Miss New York to win the Miss America title.

Awards and achievements
Preceded by Cara Mund	Miss America; 2019	Succeeded by Camille Schrier
Preceded by Gabrielle Walter	Miss New York; 2018	Succeeded by Rahmeka Cox
