= Nancy Redd =

American author and 2003 Miss Virginia

- Born: Nancy Amanda Redd; April 28, 1981 (age 45); Martinsville, Virginia, U.S.
- Education: Harvard University (B.A., 2003)
- Height: 5 ft 5 in (1.65 m)
- Spouse: Rupak Ginn
- Children: 2
- Beauty pageant titleholder
- Title: Miss Virginia 2003
- Hair color: Brown
- Eye color: Brown
- Major competition: Miss America 2004 (Top 10)

Nancy Amanda Redd (born April 28, 1981) is an American author who was Miss Virginia in 2003 and competed in Miss America, finishing in the top ten and winning the preliminary "Lifestyle & Fitness in Swimwear" competition.

Redd authored the body positive nonfiction book Body Drama: Real Girls, Real Bodies, Real Issues, Real Answers (2007), and hosted the show HuffPost Live. She is also the author of Diet Drama: Feed Your Body! Move Your Body! Love Your Body (2010) and Pregnancy, OMG!: The First Ever Photographic Guide for Modern Mamas-to-Be (2018).

Redd has since authored the children's books Bedtime Bonnet (2020) and The Real Santa (2021).

== Early life and education ==
Nancy Amanda Redd was born in Martinsville, Virginia on April 28, 1981. As a child in Virginia, she was active in 4-H, and was in Girls State in high school. In February 2002, while attending Harvard University, Redd won $250,000 on Who Wants to Be a Millionaire, and donated a considerable amount of her winnings to 4-H. Redd was one of Glamour's Top Ten College Women in October 2002. Redd graduated from Harvard with honors in 2003, with a degree in women's studies.

== Career ==
=== Books ===
Redd is the author of many nonfiction books, including the New York Times bestseller Body Drama. Her other nonfiction works on women's bodies include Diet Drama and Pregnancy OMG!.

Redd's first children's book, Bedtime Bonnet, was released in 2020. She wrote the book for her daughter to celebrate "black nighttime hair routines". Redd's second children's book is entitled The Real Santa, which was released in 2021. The book's goal was to fill a demand in the black community for representation of a black Santa Claus.

=== Hosting ===
Redd was a longtime host of HuffPost Live, which ran from 2012 to 2016. Redd hosted her last segment in 2015. Redd would go on to host the show SoMe in 2016.

== Personal life ==
Redd is married to Indian-American actor Rupak Ginn. They have two children, a son named August and a daughter also named Nancy.

== Bibliography ==
- Body Drama: Real Girls, Real Bodies, Real Issues, Real Answers (2007)
- Diet Drama: Feed Your Body! Move Your Body! Love Your Body! (2010)
- Pregnancy, OMG!: The First Ever Photographic Guide for Modern Mamas–to–Be (2018)
- Bedtime Bonnet (2020; with illustrator Nneka Myers)
- The Real Santa (2021; with illustrator Charnelle Pinkney Barlow)
