= List of beauty queen–politicians =

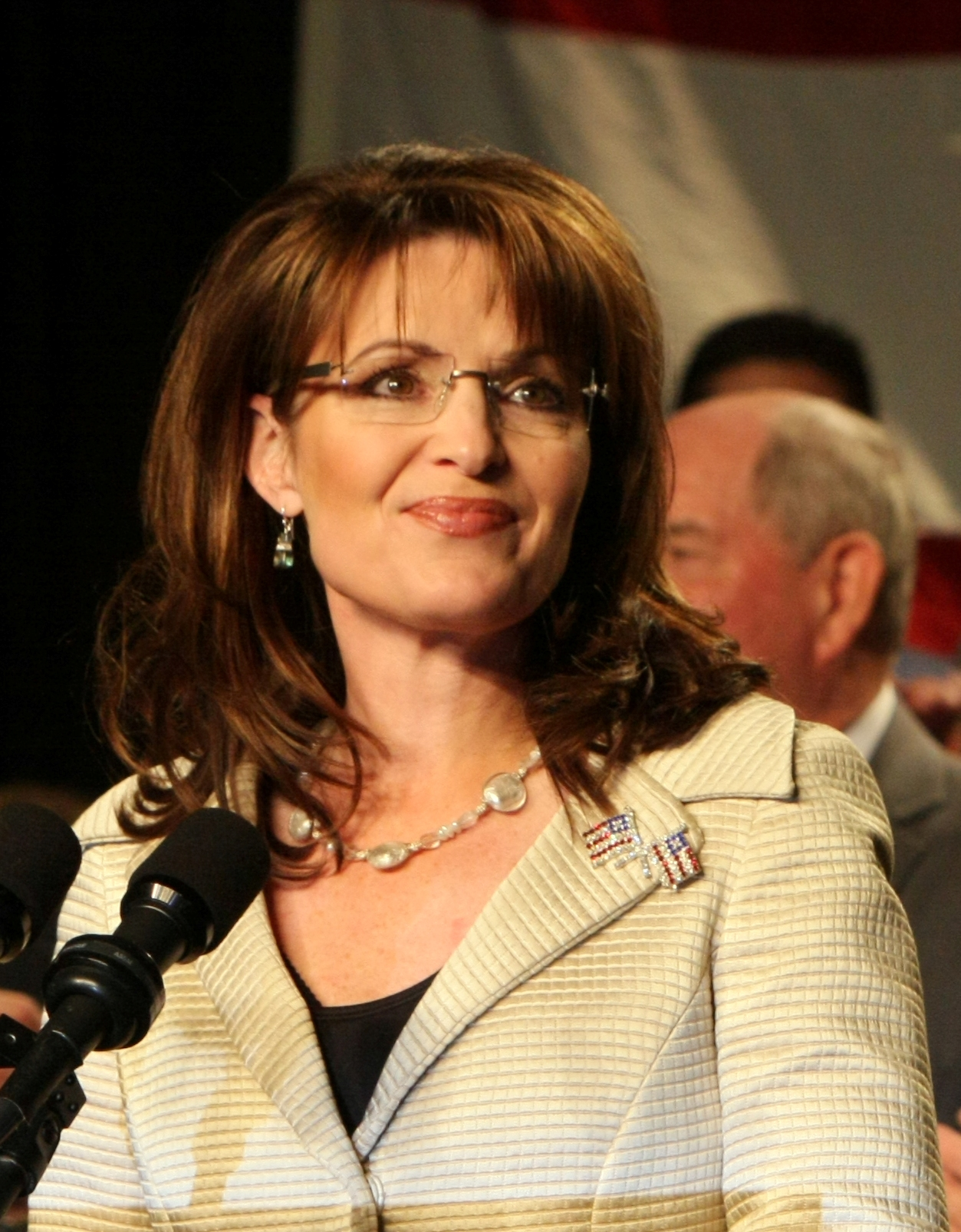
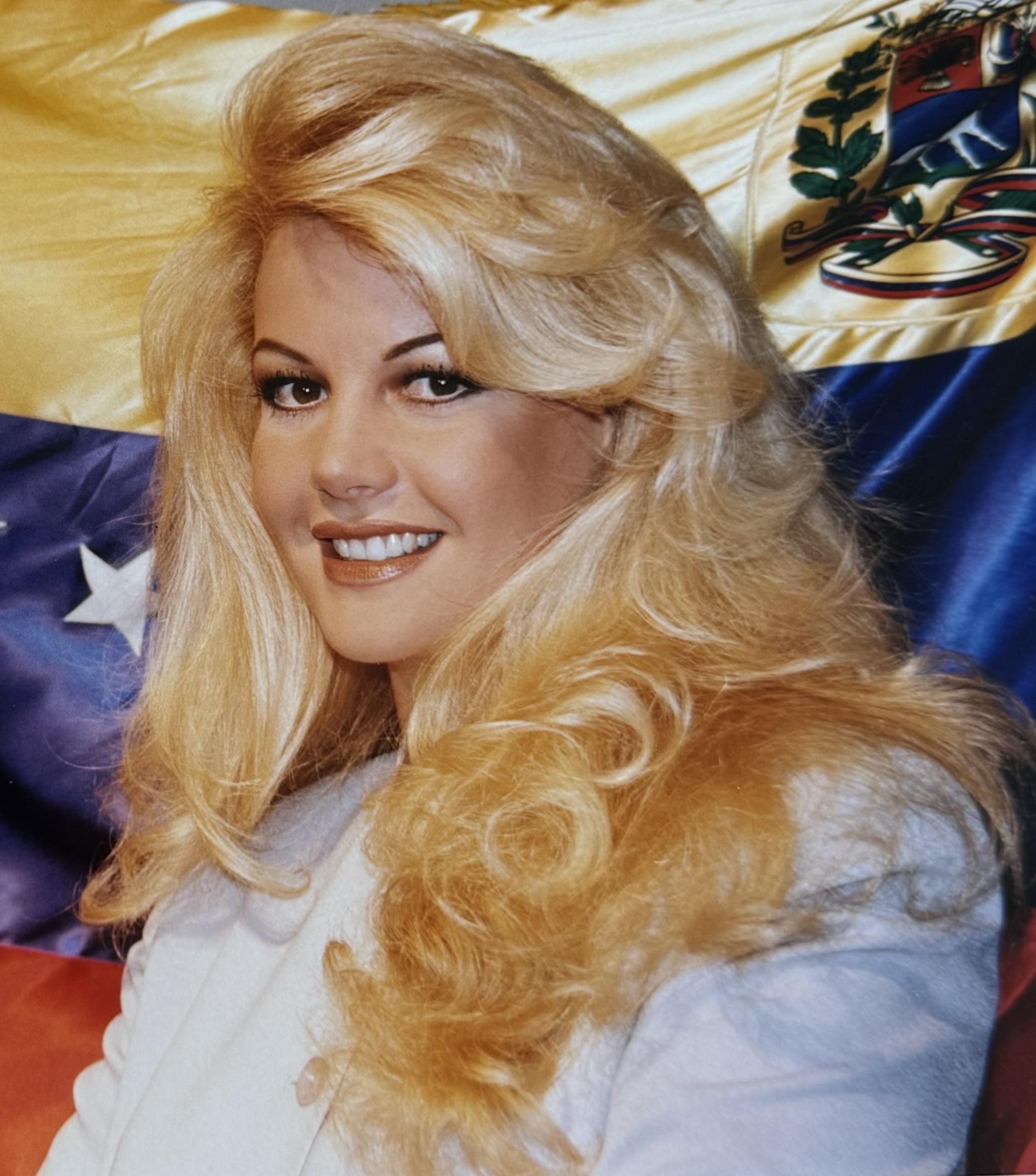
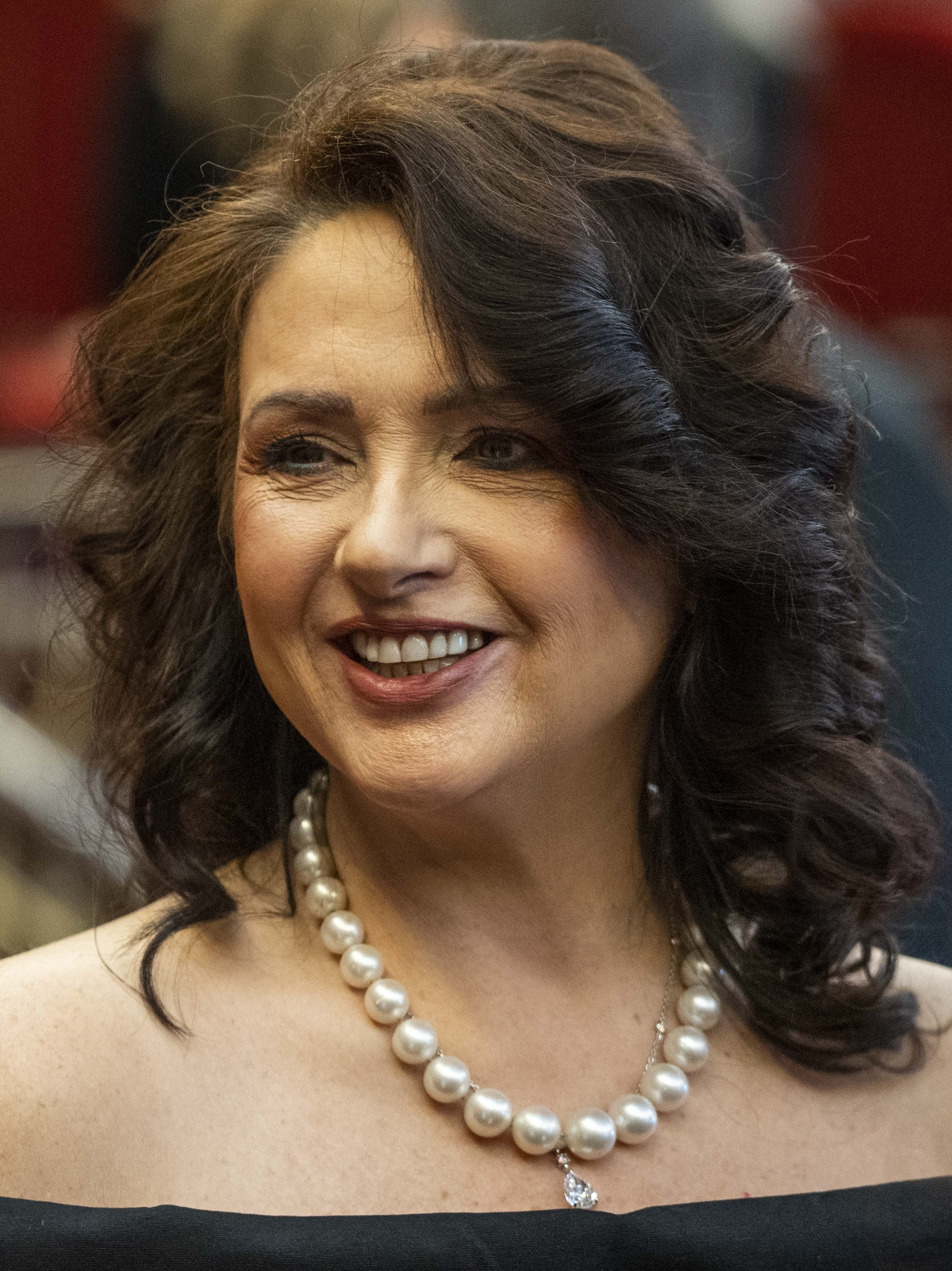
- Left: Sarah Palin, who held the titles of Miss Wasilla 1984 and second runner-up to Miss Alaska 1984, later served as governor of Alaska and as the Republican vice presidential nominee in the 2008 United States presidential election.
- Center: Irene Sáez, who held the titles of Miss Universe 1981 and Miss Venezuela 1981, later served as governor of Nueva Esparta and placed third in the 1998 Venezuelan presidential election.
- Right: Helena Dalli, who held the title of Miss World Malta 1979, later served as European Commissioner for Equality in the first von der Leyen Commission, in addition to several ministerial positions in Malta.

A number of beauty queens have run and been elected for political office and have become prominent politicians, and it has been said that "participation in beauty pageants can serve as a path to power for women".

== National officeholders ==
=== Belgium ===
- Goedele Liekens, Miss Belgium 1986
  - Member of the Chamber of Representatives (2019–present)
- Anke Van dermeersch, Miss Belgium 1991
  - Member of the Senate (2003–present)

=== Botswana ===
- Lesego Chombo, Miss World Africa 2024 and Miss Botswana 2022
  - Minister of Youth and Gender Affairs (2024–present)

=== Colombia ===
- Vanessa Mendoza, Miss Colombia 2001
  - Member of the Chamber of Representatives (2017–2018)

=== Czech Republic ===
- Monika Brzesková, Miss Europe 1995, and Miss České republiky 1995
  - Member of the Chamber of Deputies of the Czech Republic (2025–present)

=== Ecuador ===
- Rosana Vinueza, Miss Ecuador 1969
  - Undersecretary of Tourism (2000–2003)
  - Undersecretary of Social Welfare (1994–1996)
  - Member of the Guayaquil City Council (1986–1987)

=== El Salvador ===
- Carmen Elena Figueroa, Miss El Salvador 1975
  - Member of the Legislative Assembly (2006–2021)

=== Finland ===
- Tanja Karpela, Miss Finland 1991
  - Minister for Culture (2003–2007)
  - Member of Finnish Parliament for Uusimaa (1999–2011)

=== Germany ===
- Dagmar Wöhrl, Miss Germany 1977
  - Member of the Bundestag from Nuremberg North (1994–2017)

=== Indonesia ===
- Andi Tenri Natassa, Puteri Indonesia Pariwisata 2011
  - Member of People's Representative Council from South Sulawesi (2013–present)

=== Israel ===
- Limor Magen Telem, Malkat Hayofi-Esreh 1988 and Miss Europe Israel 1988
  - Member of the Knesset (2021–2022)
- Anastassia Michaeli, Miss Saint Petersburg 1995
  - Member of the Knesset (2009–2013)

=== Jamaica ===
- Lisa Hanna, Miss World 1993 and Miss Jamaica World 1993
  - Minister of Youth and Culture (2012–2016)
  - Member of the Parliament of Jamaica from Saint Ann South Eastern (2007–present)

=== Latvia ===
- Inese Šlesere, Miss Latvia 1991
  - Member of the Saeima (2002–2011)

=== Malta ===
- Helena Dalli, Miss World Malta 1979
  - European Commissioner for Equality (2019–2024)
  - Maltese Minister for European Affairs and Equality (2017–2019)
  - Maltese Minister for Social Dialogue, Consumer Affairs and Civil Liberties (2013–2017)

=== Philippines ===
- Maria Kalaw Katigbak, Queen of the Orient of the Manila Carnival 1931
  - Chairperson of the Board of Censors for Motion Pictures (1981–1985)
  - Senator of the Philippines (1961–1967)
- Imelda Marcos, Miss Manila 1953
  - Member of the Philippine House of Representatives from Ilocos Norte's 2nd district (2010–2019)
  - Member of the Philippine House of Representatives from Leyte's 1st district (1995–1998)
  - Member of the Interim Batasang Pambansa from Metro Manila (1978–1984)
  - Governor of Metro Manila (1975–1986)
- Yedda Marie Romualdez, Binibining Pilipinas International 1996
  - Member of the Philippine House of Representatives from Tingog Party List (2019–present)
  - Member of the Philippine House of Representatives from Leyte's 1st district (2016–2019)
- Mitzi Cajayon, Miss Caloocan 2000
  - Member of the Philippine House of Representatives from Caloocan's 2nd district (2007–2013; 2022–2025)
  - Member of the Caloocan City Council (2004–2007)

=== Romania ===
- Roberta Anastase, Miss Universe Romania 1996
  - President of the Chamber of Deputies of Romania (2008–2012)
  - Member of the European Parliament from Romania (2007–2008)

=== Sri Lanka ===
- Rosy Senanayake, Mrs. World 1984, Mrs. World Sri Lanka 1984, and Miss World Sri Lanka 1980
  - Mayor of Colombo (2018–2023)
  - Deputy Head of the Prime Minister's Office (2015–2018)
  - State Minister for Child Affairs (2015)
  - Member of Parliament from Colombo District (2010–2015)
  - Opposition Leader of the Western Province Provincial Council (2009–2010)
  - High Commissioner to Malaysia (2001–2004)

=== United States ===
- Marsha Blackburn, Oil Festival Queen 1969
  - U.S. Senator from Tennessee (2019–present)
  - Member of the U.S. House of Representatives from Tennessee's 7th district (2003–2019)
  - Member of the Tennessee Senate from the 23rd district (1999–2003)
- Shelley Moore Capito, West Virginia Cherry Blossom Princess 1972
  - U.S. Senator from West Virginia (2015–present)
  - Member of the U.S. House of Representatives from West Virginia's 2nd district (2001–2015)
  - Member of the West Virginia House of Delegates from the 30th district (1996–2000)
- Jennifer Granholm, Miss San Carlos 1977
  - U.S. Secretary of Energy (2021–2025)
  - Governor of Michigan (2003–2011)
  - Attorney General of Michigan (1999–2003)
- Lisa Murkowski, Alaska Cherry Blossom Princess 1980
  - U.S. Senator from Alaska (2002–present)
  - Member of the Alaska House of Representatives from the 14th district (1999–2002)
- Kristi Noem, South Dakota Snow Queen 1990
  - U.S. Secretary of Homeland Security (2025–2026)
  - Governor of South Dakota (2019–2025)
  - Member of the U.S. House of Representatives from South Dakota's at-large district (2011–2019)
  - Member of the South Dakota House of Representatives from the 6th district (2007–2011)
- Mary Peltola, Miss National Congress of American Indians 1995
  - Member of the U.S. House of Representatives from Alaska's at-large district (2022–2025)
  - Member of the Alaska House of Representatives from the 38th district (2003–2009)
  - Member of the Alaska House of Representatives from the 39th district (1999–2003)
- Elizabeth Prelogar, Miss Idaho 2004, Miss Idaho USA 2001, and Miss Idaho Teen USA 1998
  - Solicitor General of the United States (2021–2025)
  - Principal Deputy Solicitor General of the United States (2021)

== Local officeholders ==
=== Australia ===
- Beverley Pinder, Miss Universe Australia 1978
  - Councillor of the City of Melbourne (2012–2016; 2018–2020)

=== Belgium ===
- Marie-Rose Morel, Miss Flanders 1994
  - Member of the Municipal Council of Schoten (2006–2009)
  - Member of the Flemish Parliament (2004–2009)

=== Brazil ===
- Mayra Dias, Miss Brazil 2018 and Miss Amazonas 2018
  - State Deputy of Amazonas (2023–present)

=== Chile ===
- Raquel Argandoña, Miss Universo Chile 1975
  - Mayor of Pelarco (2000–2004)

=== Czech Republic ===
- Monika Brzesková, Miss České republiky and Miss Europe 1995
  - Mayor of Kravaře (2014–present)

=== France ===
- Élodie Gossuin, Miss Europe 2001, Miss France 2001, and Miss Picardy 2000
  - Member of the Regional Council of Picardy (2004–2010; 2010–2015)
- Delphine Wespiser, Miss France 2012 and Miss Alsace 2011
  - Member of the Municipal Council of Magstatt-le-Bas (2014–2020)

=== Indonesia ===
- Airin Rachmi Diany, Puteri Indonesia Pariwisata 1996
  - Mayor of South Tangerang (2011–2021)

=== Italy ===
- Franca Dall'Olio, Miss Italia 1963
  - Member of the Cagliari City Council (1994–2001)

=== Philippines ===
- Leren Bautista, Binibining Pilipinas Globe 2019, Miss Tourism Queen of the Year International 2015, and Mutya ng Pilipinas Asia Pacific International 2015
  - Member of the Municipal Council of Los Baños, Laguna (2022–present)
- Rio Diaz, Mutya ng Pilipinas Asia-Pacific 1977
  - President of the Vice-Mayors' League of Negros Occidental
  - Vice-Mayor of Pontevedra, Negros Occidental (1998–2004)
- Feliza Teresa Miro, Miss Republic of the Philippines 1969
  - Mayor of Villasis (1988–1992)
- Daisy Reyes, Binibining Pilipinas World 1996 and Mutya ng Pilipinas Expo-International 1995
  - Member of the Municipal Council of Pateros (2010–2016)

=== United Kingdom ===
- Kaiane Aldorino, Miss World 2009 and Miss Gibraltar 2009
  - Mayor of Gibraltar (2017–2019)
- Dee-Ann Kentish-Rogers, Miss Universe Great Britain 2018 and Miss Anguilla 2017
  - Minister for Education and Social Development (2020–2025)
  - Member of the Anguilla House of Assembly for Valley South (2020–2025)

=== United States ===
- Teresa Benitez-Thompson, Miss Nevada 2002
  - Majority Leader of the Nevada Assembly (2016–2022)
  - Member of the Nevada Assembly from the 27th district (2010–2022)
- Lynette Boggs, Miss Oregon 1989
  - Member of the Clark County Commission (2004–2006)
  - Member of the Las Vegas City Council (1999–2004)
- Ana Nisi Goyco, Miss World Puerto Rico 1972
  - Member of the Puerto Rico Senate from the Ponce district (1980–1992)
- Amber Hulse, Miss South Dakota USA 2023 and Miss South Dakota 2019
  - Member of the South Dakota Senate from the 30th district (2025–present)
- Jane Anne Jayroe, Miss America 1967 and Miss Oklahoma 1966
  - Oklahoma Secretary of Tourism and Recreation (1999–2003)
  - Director of the Oklahoma Department of Tourism and Recreation (1999–2003)
- Jeanné Kapela, Miss Hawaii 2015
  - Member of Hawaii House of Representatives from the 5th district (2020–present)
- Rebecca Kleefisch, Miss Ohio Teen USA 1994
  - Lieutenant Governor of Wisconsin (2011–2019)
- Shantel Krebs, Miss South Dakota 1997
  - Secretary of State of South Dakota (2015–2019)
  - Member of the South Dakota Senate from the 10th district (2011–2015)
  - Member of the South Dakota House of Representatives from the 10th district (2005–2011)
- Sue Lowden, Miss New Jersey 1973 and Miss District of Columbia USA 1971
  - Member of the Nevada Senate from the Clark 3 district (1993–1997)
- Lauren Matsumoto, Miss Hawaii 2011
  - Minority Leader of the Hawaii House of Representatives (2022–present)
  - Member of the Hawaii House of Representatives from the 45th district (2012–present)
- Melanie Miller, Miss Ohio 2006
  - Member of the Ohio House of Representatives from the 67th district (2023–present)
- Bess Myerson, Miss America 1945 and Miss New York City 1945
  - Commissioner of the New York City Department of Cultural Affairs (1983–1987)
  - Commissioner of the New York City Department of Consumer and Worker Protection (1969–1973)
- Sarah Palin, Miss Wasilla 1984
  - Governor of Alaska (2006–2009)
  - Chair of the Alaska Oil and Gas Conservation Commission (2003–2004)
  - Mayor of Wasilla (1996–2002)
  - Member of the Wasilla City Council from Ward E (1992–1996)
- Melanie Stambaugh, Daffodil Queen 2009
  - Member of the Washington House of Representatives from the 25th district (2015–2019)
- Evelyn Vázquez, Mrs. Puerto Rico
  - Member of the Puerto Rico Senate from the Mayagüez-Aguadilla district (2009–2013; 2017–2020)
- Shelli Yoder, Miss Indiana 1993
  - Minority Leader of the Indiana Senate (2025–present)
  - Member of the Indiana Senate from the 40th district (2020–present)
  - Member of the Monroe County Council from the 1st district (2013–2020)

=== Venezuela ===
- Irene Sáez, Miss Universe 1981 and Miss Venezuela 1981
  - Governor of Nueva Esparta (1999–2000)
  - Mayor of Chacao Municipality (1992–1999)

== Political candidates ==
In addition to political officeholders, several former beauty pageant titleholders have campaigned for political office but were not elected.

- Sharifa Akeel, Miss Asia Pacific International 2018 and Mutya ng Pilipinas Asia Pacific International 2018
  - 2022 Sultan Kudarat gubernatorial election
- Nafisa Ali, Femina Miss India 1976
  - 2009 Indian general election
- Amie Beth Dickinson, Miss Alabama 1994
  - 2014 Republican primary for the Alabama House of Representatives election in the 43rd district
- Ericka Dunlap, Miss America 2004 and Miss Florida 2003
  - 2017 Orlando City Council election in the 5th district
- Gemma Garrett, Miss Great Britain 2007
  - 2008 Crewe and Nantwich by-election
  - 2008 Haltemprice and Howden by-election
- Madison Gesiotto Gilbert, Miss Ohio USA 2014
  - 2022 U.S. House of Representatives election in Ohio's 13th district
- Mallory Hagan, Miss America 2013 and Miss New York 2012
  - 2018 U.S. House of Representatives election in Alabama's 3rd district
- Erika Harold, Miss America 2003 and Miss Illinois 2002
  - 2018 Illinois Attorney General election
  - 2014 Republican primary for the U.S. House of Representatives election in Illinois's 13th district
- Heather French Henry, Miss America 2000 and Miss Kentucky 1999
  - 2019 Kentucky Secretary of State election
- Lupita Jones, Miss Universe 1991 and Señorita México 1990
  - 2021 Baja California gubernatorial election
- Jessica Jordan, Miss Bolivia 2007
  - 2013 Beni special gubernatorial election
  - 2010 Beni gubernatorial election
- Aurore Kichenin, Miss World France 2017 and Miss Languedoc-Roussillon 2016
  - 2021 French regional elections in Occitanie
- Gabriela Markus, Miss Brazil 2012 and Miss Rio Grande do Sul 2012
  - 2014 Brazilian general election
- Angela McGlowan, Miss District of Columbia USA 1994
  - 2010 Republican primary for the U.S. House of Representatives election in Mississippi's 1st district
- Carmen María Montiel, Miss Venezuela 1984
  - 2022 U.S. House of Representatives election in Texas's 18th district
- Cara Mund, Miss America 2018 and Miss North Dakota 2017
  - 2024 Republican primary for the U.S. House of Representatives election in North Dakota's at-large district
  - 2022 U.S. House of Representatives election in North Dakota's at-large district
- Gul Panag, Femina Miss India 1999
  - 2014 Indian general election
- Michele Rollins, Miss USA World 1963, Miss New York City World 1963, and Miss District of Columbia USA 1963
  - 2010 Republican primary for the U.S. House of Representatives election in Delaware's at-large congressional district
- Jade Simmons, Miss Illinois 1999
  - 2020 United States presidential election
- Lisa Song Sutton, Miss Nevada United States 2014
  - 2020 Republican primary for the U.S. House of Representatives election in Nevada's 4th district
- Shamcey Supsup-Lee, Binibining Pilipinas Universe 2011
  - 2022 Philippine House of Representatives Party-list election
