= Clark Janell Davis =

American beauty pageant titleholder

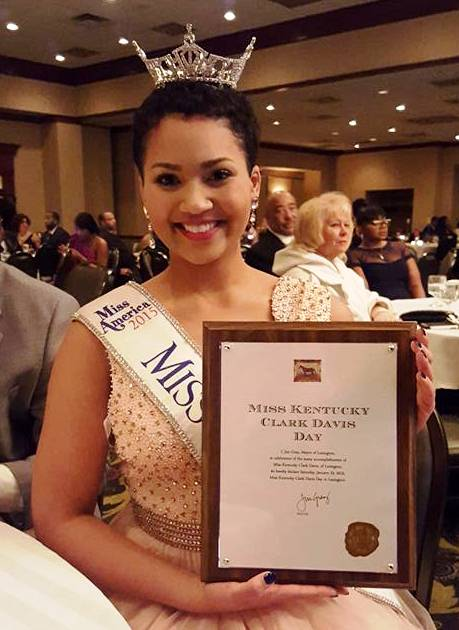
- Miss Kentucky Clark Davis Day, Saturday, January 23, 2016
- Education: University of Kentucky
- Beauty pageant titleholder
- Title: Miss Horse Capital of the World 2015; Miss Kentucky 2015
- Major competition: Miss America 2016

Clark Janell Davis is an American beauty pageant titleholder from Lexington, Kentucky, who was crowned Miss Kentucky 2015. She competed for the Miss America 2016 title in September 2015.

== Pageant career ==
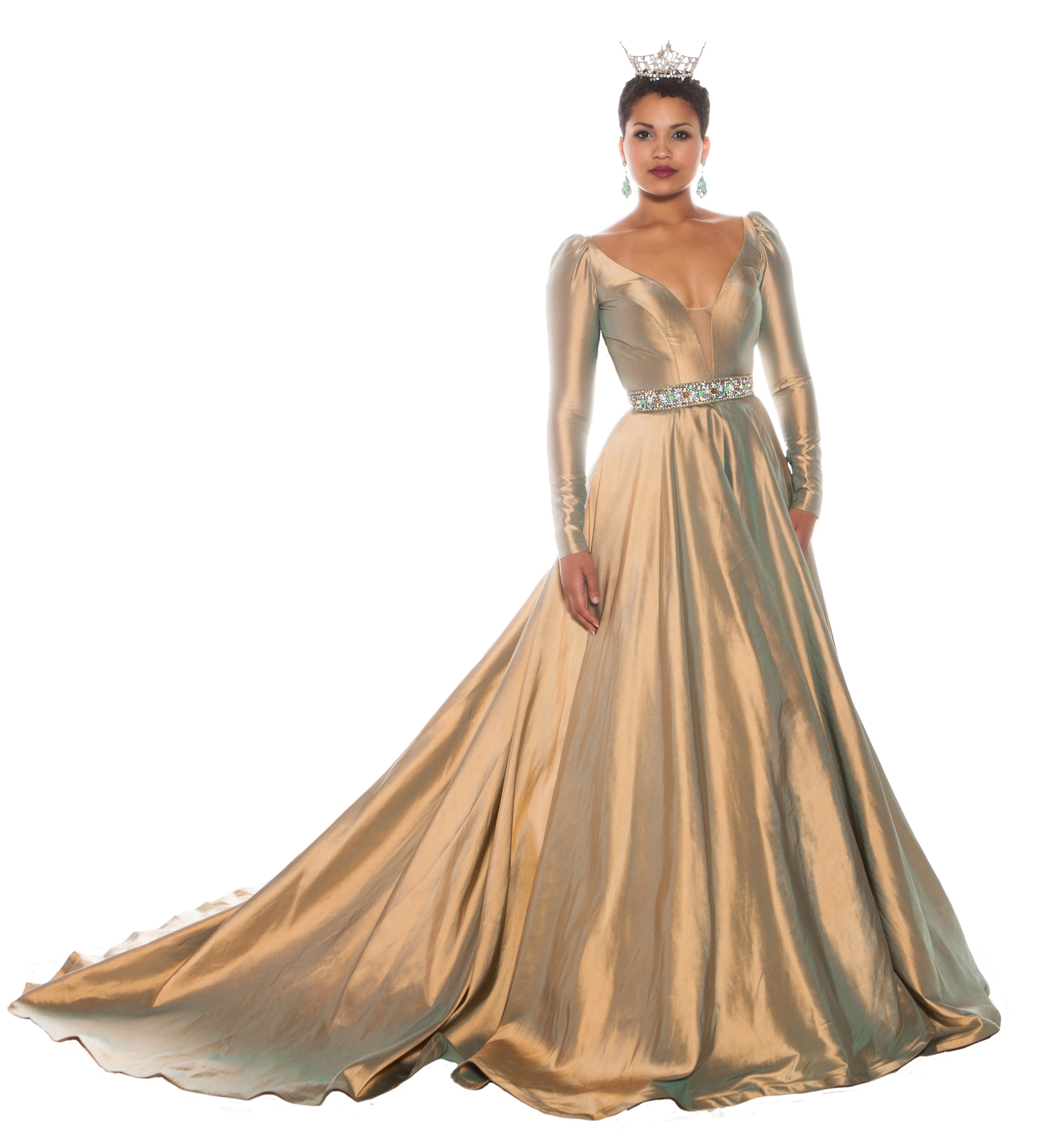
Clark Janell Davis, Miss America 2016 Evening Gown

On January 10, 2015, in a pageant held at Lexington Christian Academy, Davis was crowned Miss Horse Capital of the World 2015. With that title, she entered the Miss Kentucky pageant in July 2015 as one of 31 qualifiers for the state title. Competing at the Singletary Center for the Arts on the University of Kentucky campus, Davis sang "Summertime" from the opera Porgy and Bess by George Gershwin in the talent portion of the program. Her public service platform is increasing public awareness of dyslexia, a learning disability that Davis has worked to overcome since childhood.

Davis won the competition on Saturday, July 4, 2015, when she received her crown from outgoing Miss Kentucky titleholder Ramsey Carpenter. She earned more than $15,000 in scholarship money and other prizes from the state pageant. As Miss Kentucky, Davis's activities include public appearances across the state of Kentucky and the country sharing her struggles with dyslexia, plus her message of determination and perseverance which allowed her to graduate a year early from high school and attend the University of Kentucky on full scholarship.

=== Vying for Miss America 2016 ===
Davis was Kentucky's representative at the Miss America 2016 pageant in Atlantic City, New Jersey, in September 2015. In the televised finale on September 13, 2015, she placed outside the Top 15 semi-finalists and was eliminated from competition. Davis was the youngest competitor. She was awarded a $3,000 scholarship prize as her state's representative.

== Early life and education ==
Davis is a native of Lexington, Kentucky, and attended the School for the Creative and Performing Arts in Lexington, Kentucky, as a drama major from the 4th to the 8th grade. She is a 2014 graduate of Lafayette High School. Her father is Johnathon Davis and her mother is Ginger Lynn Davis (née Clark).

Davis attended the University of Kentucky where she studied vocal performance and political science.

== Theatre & Performances ==
Year	Show	Role/Performance	Performance Notes	Additional Performance Notes
2015	2015 Alltech Celebration of Song; University of Kentucky Opera Theatre	"O Holy Night". YouTube.	WKYT-TV, Victorian Square; December 13, 2015	

== Awards and honors ==
- "A Resolution to Honor 2015 Miss Kentucky Clark Janell Davis" (PDF). was issued on February 1, 2016, by the Kentucky State Senate.

Awards and achievements
Preceded by Ramsey Carpenter	Miss Kentucky; 2015	Succeeded by Laura Jones
