= Mallory Ervin =

American YouTube personality and former beauty pageant titleholder

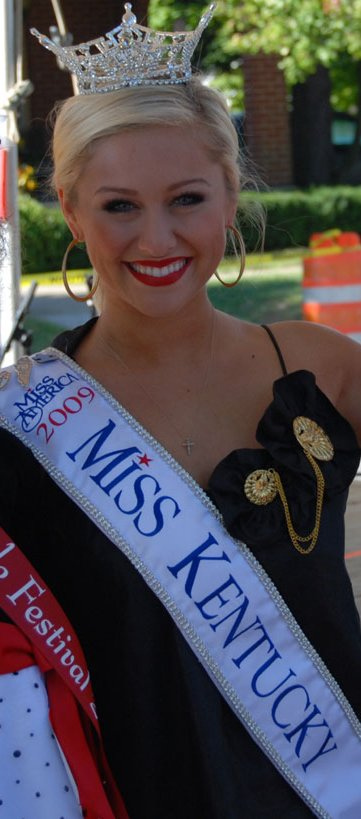
- Ervin in 2009
- Born: Mallory Christina Ervin; October 26, 1985 (age 40); Henderson, Kentucky, U.S.
- Education: Union County High School; Eastern Kentucky University (P.S.); Sewanee: The University of the South (T.A.)
- Occupations: YouTube personality, former entertainer and former beauty pageant titleholder
- Years active: 2005–present
- Television: Miss America 2010 (5th place); The Amazing Race 17 (6th place); The Amazing Race 18 (3rd place); The Amazing Race 24 (10th place)
- Spouse: Kyle DiMeola (m. 2017)
- Children: 4
- Beauty pageant titleholder
- Title: Miss Heartland 2007; Miss Berea Area 2008; Miss Congeniality 2009; Miss Bowling Green 2009; Miss Kentucky 2009
- Hair color: Blonde
- Eye color: Blue
- Major competitions: Miss Congeniality 2007 (Top 10); Miss Kentucky 2007 (Top 10); Miss Congeniality 2008 (4th runner-up); Miss Kentucky 2008 (4th runner-up); Miss America 2010 (4th runner-up)

X information
- Handle: @malloryervin
- Years active: 2011–present
- Topic: Vlogging
- Followers: 5,707 (September 6, 2025)

YouTube information
- Channel: Mallory Ervin
- Years active: 2011–present
- Subscribers: 142 thousand (September 6, 2025)
- Views: 20 million (September 6, 2025)
- Website: malloryervin.com

Mallory Christina Ervin (born October 26, 1985) is an American YouTube personality, former entertainer and former beauty pageant titleholder from Morganfield, Kentucky. She held the title of Miss Kentucky 2009 and was the fourth runner-up to Miss America 2010. In September 2010, it was announced that she would be competing on The Amazing Race 17 with her father Gary. The Amazing Race was filmed in May and June 2010 and premiered on September 26, 2010. Gary & Mallory were also one of the teams to return for The Amazing Race 18, which premiered on February 20, 2011. Ervin returned to the race to join Mark Jackson in The Amazing Race 24, which premiered on February 23, 2014, after Jackson's teammate William "Bopper" Minton was deemed unfit to race for health reasons.

== Miss Kentucky ==
Ervin won the title of Miss Kentucky 2009, on July 18, 2009, when she earned her crown from outgoing titleholder Emily Cox. Ervin is a graduate of the Sewanee: The University of the South in Tennessee with a degree in Theater Arts. Her platform was Autism Awareness and her talent was a vocal performance.

== The Amazing Race ==
Gary and Mallory's best placements on The Amazing Race 17 were three consecutive second-place finishes (leg 3, leg 4 and leg 5). They were eliminated in the eighth leg, finishing in 6th place.

=== Season 17 Finishes ===
- 6th (leg 1)
- 9th (leg 2)
- 2nd (leg 3)
- 2nd (leg 4)
- 2nd (leg 5)
- 6th (leg 6)
- 4th (leg 7)
- 6th (leg 8/eliminated)

On The Amazing Race 18, Gary and Mallory achieved three first-place finishes, two second-place finishes and two third-place finishes. The team made last place in the 8th leg and had to perform a penalty task in the 9th leg to be allowed to continue racing. Ultimately, Mallory and her father placed third out of the 11 teams in the final leg, losing to Harlem Globetrotters of Flight Time & Big Easy (runner-up) and Sisters of Kisha & Jen, who won the race.

=== Season 18 Finishes ===
- 1st (leg 1)
- 9th (leg 2)
- 2nd (leg 3)
- 3rd (leg 4)
- 2nd (leg 5)
- 1st (leg 6)
- 4th (leg 7)
- 6th (leg 8/Non-elimination leg)
- 4th (leg 9)
- 3rd (leg 10)
- 1st (leg 11)
- 3rd (Final Leg)

On The Amazing Race 24, Mallory joined Mark Jackson after his teammate William "Bopper" Minton was deemed unfit to race due to pancreatitis. They finished in 6th place in the first leg, but then they were eliminated in the second leg, finishing in 10th place.

Awards and achievements
Preceded by Emily Cox	Miss Kentucky; 2009	Succeeded by Djuan Trent
