= Djuan Trent =

American YouTube personality and former beauty pageant titleholder

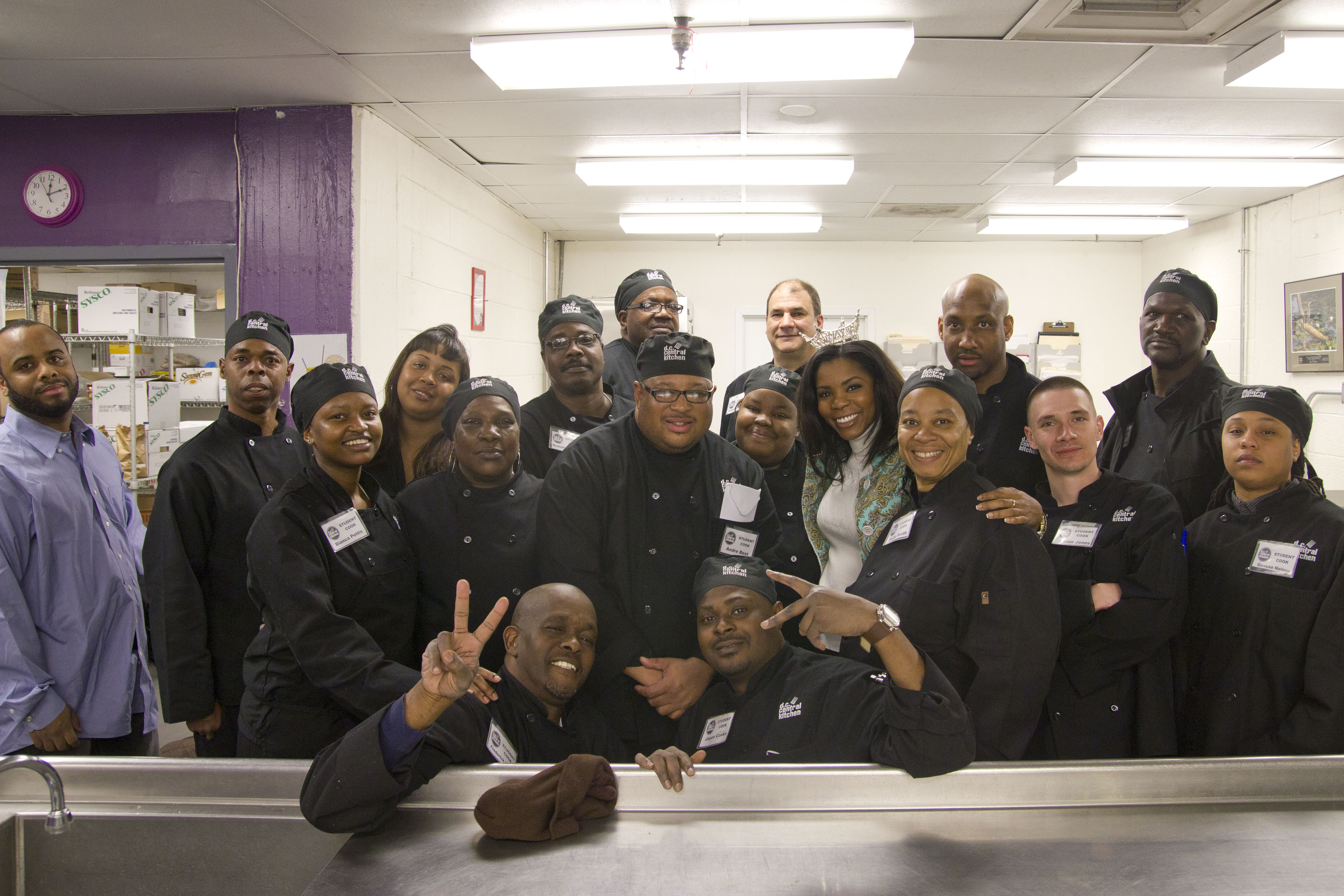
- Trent at the D.C. Central Kitchen in Washington, D.C. in 2011
- Born: Djuan Keila Trent; November 20, 1986 (age 39); Columbus, Georgia, U.S.
- Education: Berea College (B.A.)
- Occupations: YouTube personality and former beauty pageant titleholder
- Beauty pageant titleholder
- Title: Miss Carter County 2009; Miss Berea Area 2010; Miss Kentucky 2010
- Hair color: Brunette
- Eye color: Brown
- Major competitions: Miss Kentucky 2009 (Top 10); Miss America 2011 (Top 10)

X information
- Handle: @itstrentyall
- Years active: 2009–present
- Topic: Vlogging
- Followers: 1,053 (September 6, 2025)

YouTube information
- Channel: Djuan Trent
- Years active: 2012–present
- Subscribers: 201 (September 6, 2025)
- Views: 1,667 (September 6, 2025)
- Website: www.djuantrent.com

Djuan Keila Trent (born November 20, 1986) is an American YouTube personality and former beauty pageant titleholder from Columbus, Georgia who was named Miss Kentucky 2010.

== Biography ==
Trent graduated from Berea College in 2009 having majored in theater performance.

Trent won the title of Miss Kentucky on July 17, 2010, when she received her crown from outgoing titleholder Mallory Ervin. Trent was among the top ten in the Miss America 2011 pageant.

Trent publicly came out as queer with an announcement on her blog on February 20, 2014. The self-described former student from a Southern Baptist conservative Christian school told The Huffington Post that she came out "to help foster visibility of young queer women of color."

Trent is an honorary co-chair of Southerners For the Freedom to Marry.

Awards and achievements
Preceded by Mallory Ervin	Miss Kentucky; 2010	Succeeded by Ann-Blair Thornton
