= Ramsey Carpenter-Bearse =

American beauty pageant winner (born 1990)

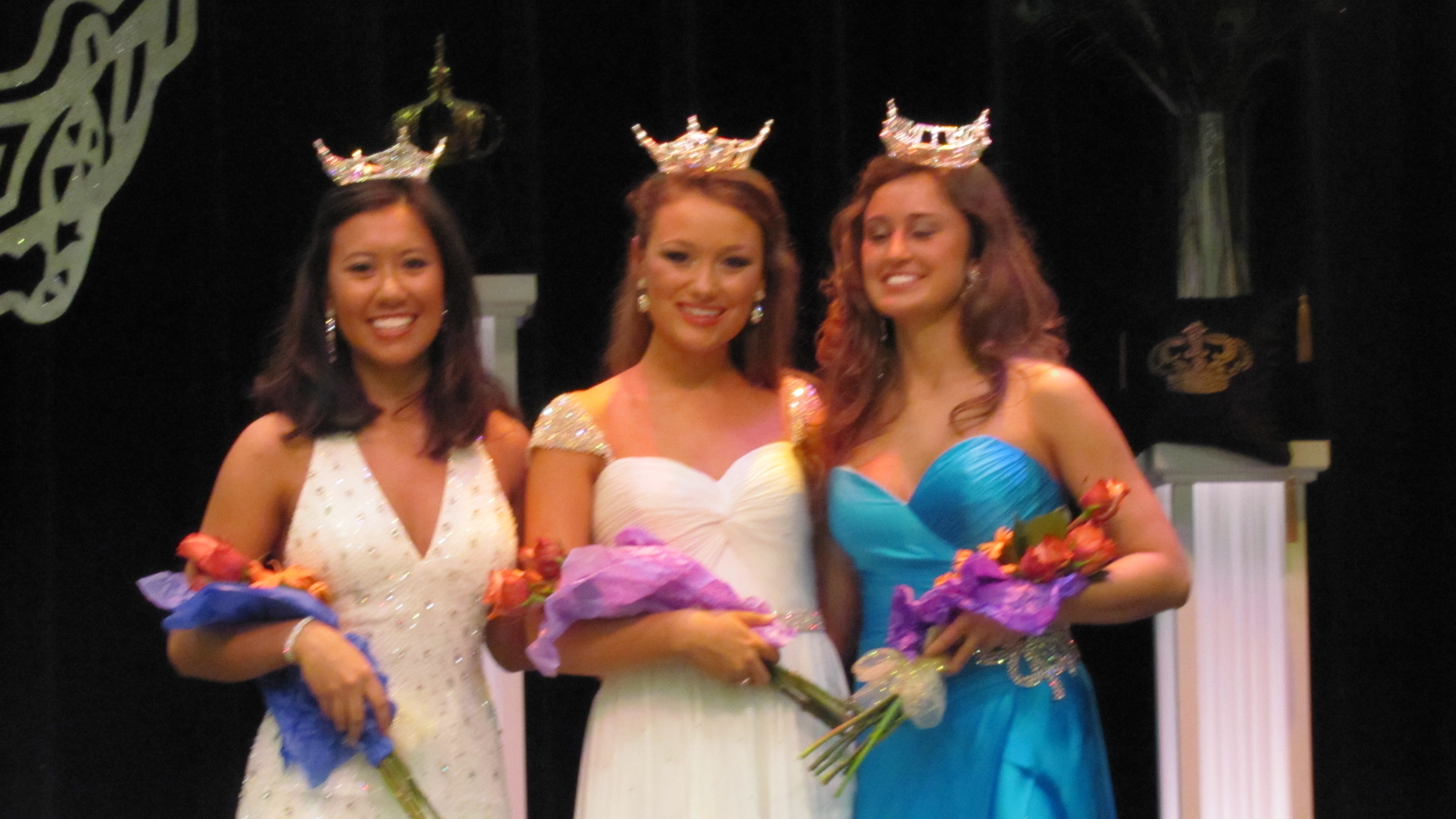
- Jenna Day (middle) and Ramsey Carpenter (right) in 2011
- Born: Ramsey BethAnn Carpenter; December 15, 1990 (age 35); Owensboro, Kentucky, U.S.
- Education: University of Kentucky (B.A.)
- Spouse: Charles "Chas" Bearse (m. 2016)
- Height: About 5 ft 6 in
- Beauty pageant titleholder
- Title: Miss Kentucky 2014
- Hair color: Brown
- Eye color: Green
- Major competitions: Miss Kentucky 2014 (winner); Miss America 2015 (top 12)

Ramsey BethAnn Carpenter-Bearse (née Carpenter, born December 15, 1990) is a registered sex offender, American beauty pageant titleholder, and former teacher. She was named Miss Kentucky 2014 on July 12, 2014, and competed for the title of Miss America 2015, where she won the preliminary talent competition and placed in the Top 12 as a semi-finalist. Her platform issue was multiple sclerosis awareness.

In July 2020, Carpenter-Bearse was sentenced to two years in prison for exchanging explicit photographs with a minor.

== Education and music ==
Carpenter-Bearse is a graduate of the University of Kentucky with a Bachelor of Arts degree in special education with a focus on learning and behavior disorders. An accomplished bluegrass fiddle player, she participated in musical competitions at festivals and other venues while in high school and college. Known as "the girl with the green fiddle", she began playing the instrument at age 15.

== Career ==
Carpenter-Bearse was named Miss Kentucky 2014 on July 12, 2014. She competed for the title of Miss America 2015, where she won the preliminary talent competition and placed in the Top 12 as a semi-finalist. Her platform issue was multiple sclerosis awareness. Diagnosed with multiple sclerosis in 2010, she has served as a spokeswoman for the National Multiple Sclerosis Society.

After her beauty competition career, Carpenter-Bearse began teaching science at Andrew Jackson Middle School in Cross Lanes, West Virginia. On December 7, 2018, Carpenter-Bearse was arrested for allegedly sending topless photos to a 15-year-old boy, a former student of hers in the Kanawha County School District. She was charged with four felony counts of distribution or display of obscene matter to minors. Carpenter-Bearse testified that the matter started when she tried to send a photo to her husband, but accidentally sent it to the teen, who thereafter asked for more photos and she was "afraid to not appease him." A year later, she pleaded guilty to one felony count of possession of material depicting minors in sexually explicit conduct. In July 2020, she was sentenced to two years imprisonment, ten years supervised release, and registering as a lifetime sex offender.

Awards and achievements
Preceded by Jenna Day	Miss Kentucky; 2014	Succeeded by Clark Janell Davis
