= Jenna Day =

American beauty pageant contestant

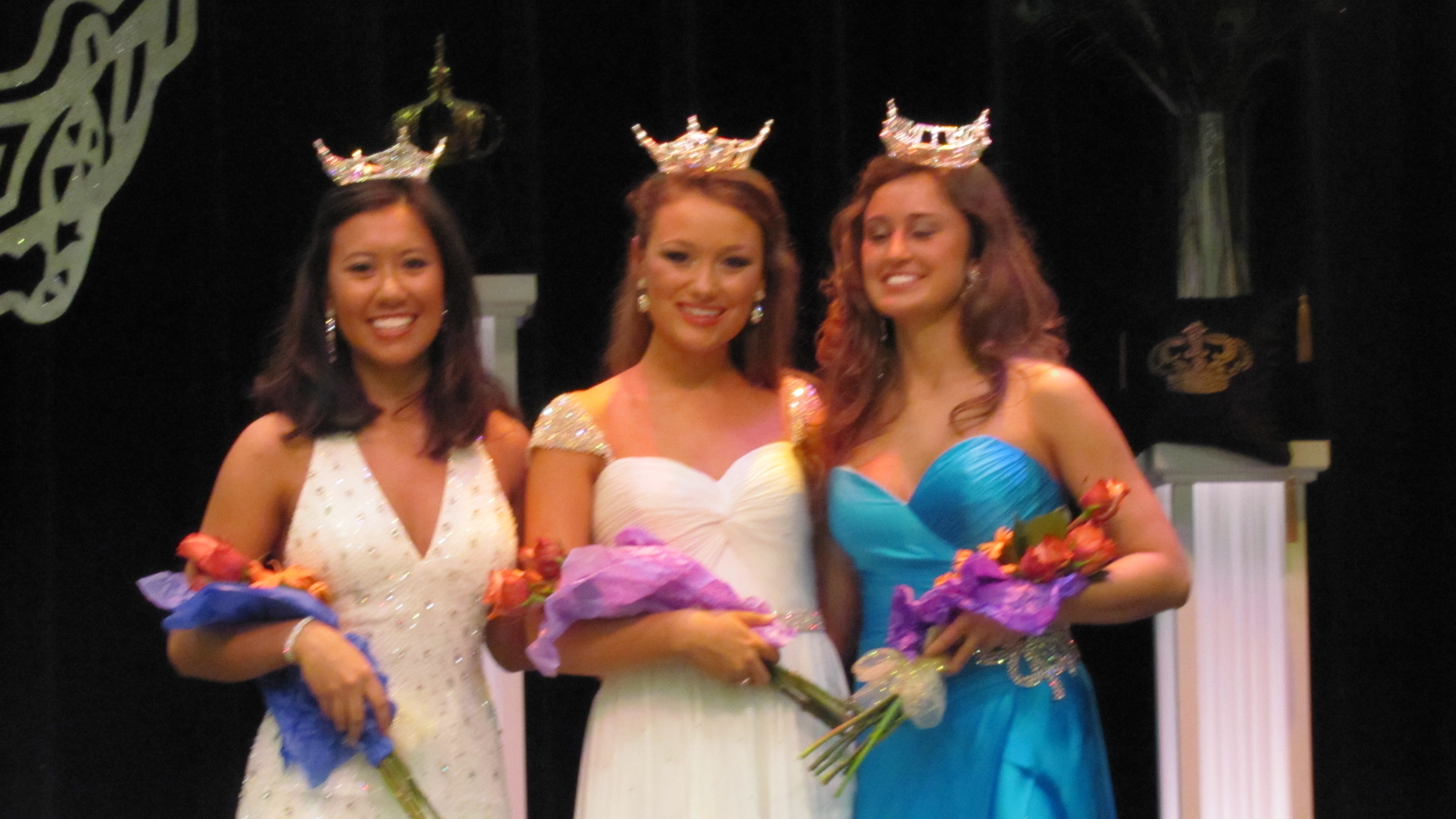
- Jenna Day (middle) and Ramsey Carpenter (right) in 2011
- Born: Jenna Nicole Day; Louisville, Kentucky, U.S.
- Education: University of Kentucky
- Beauty pageant titleholder
- Title: Miss Berea Area 2013; Miss Kentucky 2013
- Hair color: Brunette
- Eye color: Brown
- Major competition: Miss America 2014 (Top 15)

Jenna Nicole Day is an American beauty pageant contestant from Louisville, Kentucky, named Miss Kentucky 2013 on June 29, succeeding Jessica Casebolt. She was a Top 15 Finalist in the 2014 Miss America pageant. Her platform was "Improving the Lives of Special Needs Children".

Awards and achievements
| Preceded by Jessica Casebolt | Miss Kentucky; 2013 | Succeeded by Ramsey Carpenter |
