= Kaitlynne Postel =

- Born: Kaitlynne D. Postel; September 7, 1986 (age 40); Miami, Florida, U.S.
- Education: Hilliard Davidson High School; University of Kentucky
- Height: 5 ft 8 in (1.73 m)
- Beauty pageant titleholder
- Title: Miss Monticello 2007; Miss Kentucky 2007
- Hair color: Blonde
- Eye color: Green
- Major competition: Miss America 2007

Kaitlynne D. Postel (born September 7, 1986) is an American pageant competitor and vocalist from Lexington, Kentucky who competed in the Miss America pageant in 2008.

She is also listed on their website a member of the Lexington Lab Band as a backup singer.

== Pageant history ==
Kaitlynne won the Miss Kentucky 2007 title in a state pageant held in Lexington at the Singletary Center for the Arts on the University of Kentucky campus on July 21, 2007. She competed as Miss Monticello, a local title she won in November 2006. She had also competed in the Miss Lexington Pageant, her first pageant, where she received 3rd runner-up. Kaitlynne's mother Lynne Postel held many Kentucky local titles, and was 1st runner up. In 1982, Lynne was crowned Miss Maryland. Kaitlynne's aunt, Maricia Malone Bell was Miss Kentucky 1978. Her cousin is famed actress, Laura Bell Bundy.

In December 2008, Kaitlynne competed in the Miss Kentucky USA pageant, where she placed 2nd runner up.

== Miss America ==
She competed in the Miss America 2008 contest in Las Vegas in 2008. She performed "So Much Better" from Legally Blonde: The Musical, in which her cousin and close friend Laura Bell Bundy was the star.

Awards and achievements
Preceded by Rachelle Phillips	Miss Kentucky; 2007	Succeeded by Emily Cox
