= Miss Kentucky =

Beauty pageant competition

- Formation: 1922
- Type: Beauty pageant
- Headquarters: Louisville
- Location: Kentucky
- Members: Miss America
- Official language: English
- Website: www.misskentucky.org

The Miss Kentucky competition is the pageant that selects the representative for the state of Kentucky in the Miss America pageant.

Only once has a Miss Kentucky won the Miss America crown, in 1999 when Heather French Henry of Maysville, Kentucky earned the national Miss America 2000 title. Additionally, Venus Ramey, a native of Somerset, Kentucky, was named Miss America of 1944 while competing as Miss Washington, DC.

Multiple Miss Kentucky titleholders have gone on to make themselves notable:

- Heather French Henry, Miss Kentucky 1999, is Kentucky's only Miss America winner to date.
- Mallory Ervin, Miss Kentucky 2010, is most well known for her appearance on the American television show, The Amazing Race.
- Djuan Trent, Miss Kentucky 2011, was the first Miss America contestant to openly come out as queer.

Reagan Earlywine of Paris was crowned Miss Kentucky on June 13, 2026, at the Southern Kentucky Performing Arts Center in Bowling Green, Kentucky. She competed for the title of Miss America 2027 on September 6, 2026, at the Kravis Center for the Performing Arts in West Palm Beach, Florida.

== Gallery of past titleholders ==
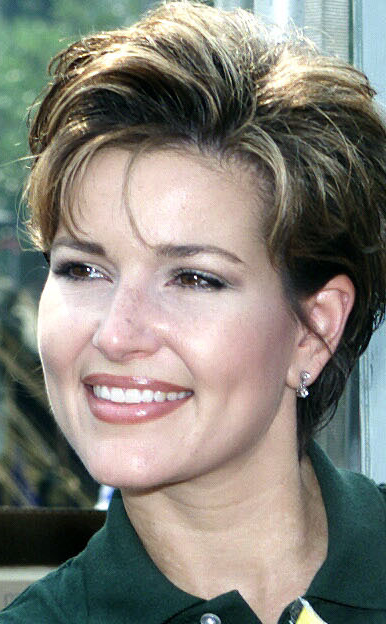
Heather French,
Miss Kentucky 1999 and Miss America 2000

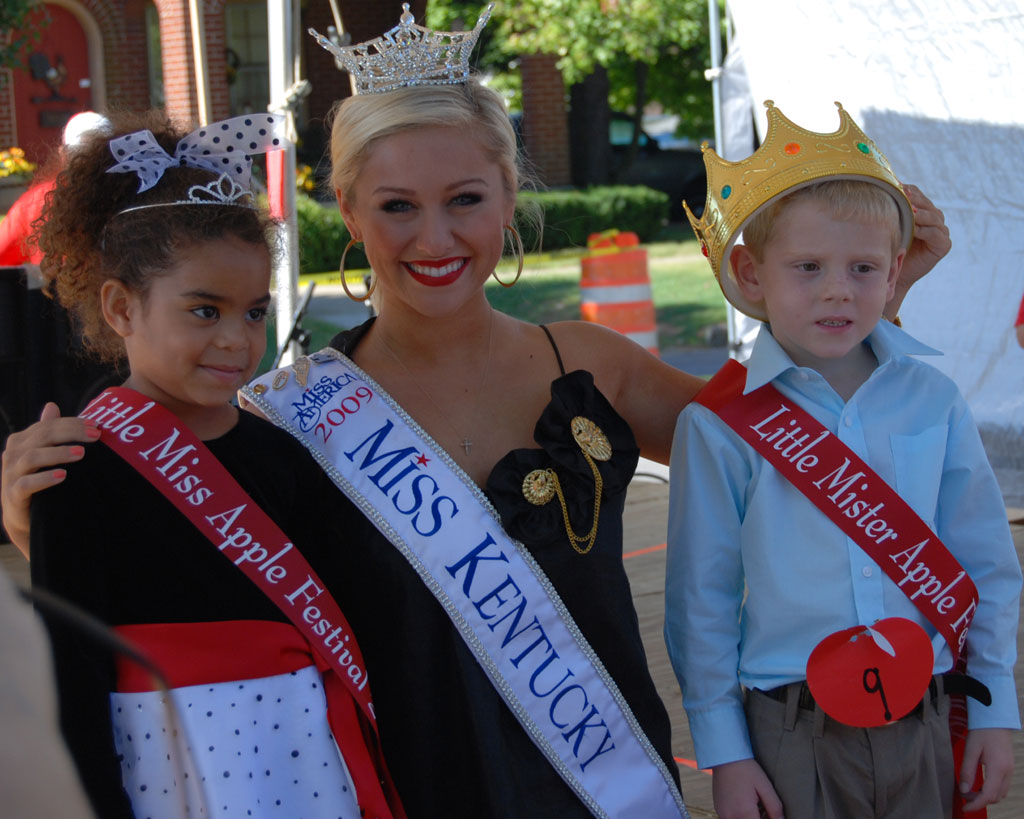
Mallory Ervin,
Miss Kentucky 2009

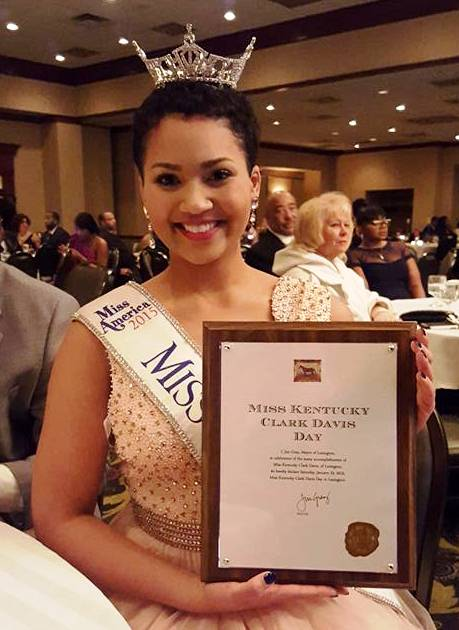
Clark Davis,
Miss Kentucky 2015

== Results summary ==
The following is a visual summary of the past results of Miss Kentucky titleholders at the national Miss America pageants/competitions. The year in parentheses indicates the year of the national competition during which a placement and/or award was garnered, not the year attached to the contestant's state title.

=== Placements ===
- Miss Americas: Heather French (2000)
- 2nd runners-up: Jean Megerle (1935)
- 3rd runners-up: Darlene Compton (1975), Mallory Hudson (2024)
- 4th runners-up: Dorothy Slatten (1940), Chera-Lyn Cook (1999), Whitney Renee Boyles (2001), Mallory Ervin (2010)
- Top 10: Linda Sawyer (1965), Marcia Malone Bell (1978), Gwendolyn Suzanne Witten (1983), Lynn Whitney Thompson (1984), Kelly Lin Brumagen (1985), Laurie Janine Keller (1986), Tawnya Dawn Mullins (1993), Veronica Marie Duka (1997), Djuan Trent (2011)
- Top 11: Ariana Rodriguez (2025)
- Top 12: Emily Cox (2009), Ramsey Carpenter (2015), Laura Jones (2017)
- Top 15: Mary Madeline O'Laughlin (1925), Jean Megerle* (1936), Charlet Hiteman (1936), Dorothy Slatten (1941), Evelyn L. Murray (1947), Jessica Casebolt (2013), Jenna Day (2014)
- Top 16: Patricia Alden Fenton** (1946)
- Top 18: Lucille Rader (1933)

=== Awards ===
==== Preliminary awards ====
- Preliminary Lifestyle and Fitness: Dorothy Slatten (1940), Evelyn L. Murray (1947), Tawnya Mullins (1993), Heather French (2000), Whitney Renee Boyles (2001)
- Preliminary Talent: Darlene Compton (1975), Gwendolyn Witten (1983), Chera-Lyn Cook (1999), Ramsey Carpenter (2015)

==== Non-finalist awards ====
- Non-finalist Talent: Jane Brock (1958), Marsha Griffith (1976), Victoria Harned (1977), Melinda Cumberledge (1987), Tonya Virgin (1994), MacKenzie Mayes (2004)
- Non-finalist Interview: Maria Maldonado (2005)

==== Other awards ====
- Miss Congeniality: Hannah Edelen (2022)
- America's Choice: Laura Katherine Jones (2017)
- Dr. David. B. Allman Medical Scholarship: Kelly Lin Brumagen (1985), Mary Catherine Correll (2003)
- Jean Bartel Social Impact Finalists: Hannah Edelen (2022)
- Konica Visual Arts Scholarship: Kristie Hicks (1996)
- Louanne Gamba Instrumental Award: Ramsey Carpenter (2015)
- Quality of Life Award Winners: Emily Cox (2009), Ann Blair Thornton (2012)
- Quality of Life Award 1st runners-up: Heather French (2000), MacKenzie Mayes (2004)
- Quality of Life Award Finalists: Whitney Boyles (2001), Mary Catherine Correll (2003), Mallory Ervin (2010)
- STEM Scholarship Award Winners: Molly Matney (2018)
- Women in Business Scholarship Award Winners: Alex Francke (2020)

* Competed as Miss Blue Grass
** Competed as Miss Louisville

== Winners ==
- Declared as winner
- Ended as a runner-up
- Ended as a finalist or semi-finalist

Year	Name	Hometown	Age	Local Title	Miss America Talent	Placement at Miss America	Special scholarships at Miss America	Notes
2026	Reagan Earlywine	Paris	24	Miss Monticello	Dance			
2025	Ariana Rodriguez	Bardstown	20	Miss Bardstown	Vocal	Top 11		
2024	Chapel Tinius	Bowling Green	24	Miss My Old Kentucky Home	Fiddle Medley			Previously Miss Kentucky's Outstanding Teen 2016 Previously Distinguished Young Woman of Kentucky 2018
2023	Mallory Hudson	Bowling Green	22	Miss Bowling Green	Vocal, "I Who Have Nothing"	3rd Runner-Up		
2022	Hannah M. Edelen	Springfield	24	Miss Heart of Central Kentucky	Clogging, “Banjo Fantasy”		Jean Bartel Social Impact Finalist Miss Congeniality	
2021	Haley Wheeler	Clay City	23	Miss Bowling Green	Vocal			
2019–20 (Note: Titleholder extended to a full year in 2020 after state and national pageants postponed due to the COVID-19 pandemic)	Alex Francke	Lexington	22	Miss Central Kentucky	Vocal, "Maybe This Time"		Women in Business Scholarship Award	Previously Miss Kentucky's Outstanding Teen 2014 Previously Miss Kentucky Sweetheart 2018; 4th runner-up at National Sweetheart 2018 pageant
2018	Katie Michelle Bouchard	Owensboro	22	Miss Jefferson County	Clogging, "Soul Man"			
2017	Molly Matney	Center	20	Miss Mammoth Cave Area	Vocal, "He Taught Me to Yodel"		STEM Scholarship Award	
2016	Laura Jones	Fisherville	23	Miss Danville	Violin	Top 12	America's Choice	Previously Miss Kentucky's Outstanding Teen 2010; Top 10 at Miss America's Outstanding Teen 2011 pageant
2015	Clark Davis	Lexington	17	Miss Horse Capital	Cappella Vocal, "Summertime"			
2014	Ramsey Carpenter	Hartford	23	Miss My Old Kentucky Home	Fiddle, "Sally Goodin" & "Orange Blossom Special"	Top 12	Louanne Gamba Instrumental Award Preliminary Talent Award	In December 2018, she was arrested for allegedly sending nude photos of herself via Snapchat to an underage student Charged with four felony counts of distribution or display of obscene matter to minors and was released on $10,000 bail
2013	Jenna Day	Louisville	21	Miss Berea Area	Vocal, "And This Is My Beloved"	Top 15		Top 10 at National Sweetheart 2011 pageant
2012	Jessica Casebolt	Pikeville	19	Miss Goldenrod	Vocal, "Superstar"	Top 15		
2011	Ann Blair Thornton	Bowling Green	21	Miss Bowling Green	Piano, "Prelude in G Minor"		Quality of Life Award Winner	Previously Miss Kentucky's Outstanding Teen 2007; 4th runner-up at Miss America's Outstanding Teen 2008 pageant 1st runner-up at National Sweetheart 2010 pageant
2010	Djuan Trent	Columbus, GA	23	Miss Berea Area	Vocal, "A Change Is Gonna Come"	Top 10		Eligible to compete at Miss Kentucky as a Berea College student Voted into the Top 15 as a "Contestants' Choice" finalist by her fellow contestants
2009	Mallory Ervin	Morganfield	23	Miss Bowling Green	Vocal, "On My Own"	4th runner-up	Quality of Life Award Finalist	Voted into the Top 15 as a "America's Choice" contestant by TV viewers Contestant on The Amazing Race (seasons 17, 18, and 24)
2008	Emily Ann Cox	Campbellsville	22	Miss Bowling Green	Classical Piano, "Impromptu in C Sharp Minor" by Hugo Reinhold	Top 12	Quality of Life Award Winner	Contestant at National Sweetheart 2005 pageant
2007	Kaitlynne Postel	Lexington	20	Miss Monticello	Vocal, "So Much Better" from Legally Blonde		Kaitlynne Dorothy Postel performed "So Much Better" from Legally Blonde: The Musical, in which her cousin and close friend Laura Bell Bundy was the star.	Daughter of Miss Maryland 1982, Lynne Carol Graham Niece (by marriage) of Miss Kentucky 1978, Marcia Malone Bell
2006	Rachelle Nicole Phillips	Princeton	24	Miss Heartland	Vocal, "Cry Me a River"			
2005	Kerri Katelyn Mitchell	Barbourville	21	Miss Jeffersontown	Vocal, "Born to Fly"			
2004	Maria Maldonado	Lexington	22	Miss Heart of the South	Vocal, "Your Daddy's Son" from Ragtime		Non-finalist Interview Award	Previously Miss Kentucky's Outstanding Teen 1999
2003	MacKenzie Mayes	Lexington	23	Miss Monticello	Vocal, "I Surrender"		Non-finalist Talent Award Quality of Life 1st runner-up	Previously National Sweetheart 2000
2002	Mary Catherine Correll	Somerset	21	Miss Maysville Area	Vocal, "The Prayer"		Dr. David B. Allman Medical Scholarship Quality of Life Finalist	Daughter of Miss Kentucky USA 1975 and Miss Wyoming 1976, Carol June Wallace
2001	Monica Lutrece Hardin	Louisville	20	Miss Jeffersontown	Vocal, "If You Believe" from The Wiz			First Miss Kentucky Teen, crowned in 1998
2000	Whitney Renee Boyles	Louisville	22	Miss Northern Kentucky	Vocal, "In His Eyes" from Jekyll & Hyde	4th runner-up	Preliminary Swimsuit Award Quality of Life Award Finalist	
1999	Shanna Kari Moore	Marion		Miss Jeffersontown	Classical Piano	Did not compete; later assumed the title after French won Miss America 2000		
1999	Shanna Kari Moore	Marion		Miss Jeffersontown	Classical Piano			4th runner-up (1998) & 3rd runner-up (1999) at National Sweetheart pageants
1999	Heather French	Maysville	24	Miss Louisville	Vocal, "As If We Never Said Goodbye" from Sunset Boulevard	Winner	Preliminary Swimsuit Award Quality of Life Award 1st runner-up	
1998	Chera-Lyn Cook	London	21	Miss Lexington	Vocal, "When a Man Loves a Woman"	4th runner-up	Preliminary Talent Award	Previously National Sweetheart 1997
1997	Lori Menshouse	Ashland	24	Miss Ashland Area	Piano, "Revolutionary Etude" by Chopin			Later Miss Kentucky USA 1999
1996	Veronica Marie Duka	Campbellsville	19	Miss Campbellsville	Vocal, "Somewhere"	Top 10		
1995	Kristie Dawn Hicks	Bardstown	23	Miss Jeffersontown	Vocal, "Stormy Weather"		Konica Visual Arts Scholarship	Previously Miss Kentucky Teen USA 1989; 1st runner-up at Miss Teen USA 1989 pageant
1994	Laura Sue Humphress	Campbellsville	22	Miss Heart of the Bluegrass	Classical Piano, "Toccata in E-flat minor" by Aram Khachaturian			
1993	Tonya Dee Virgin	Oldtown	24	Miss East Kentucky	Country Vocal, "If I Could Only Be Like You"		Non-finalist Talent Award	
1992	Tawnya Dawn Mullins	Kimper	25	Miss Heart of Kentucky	Contemporary Clogging, "Banjo Fantasy"	Top 10	Preliminary Swimsuit Award	
1991	Sheri Lynn Plambeck	Lexington	23	Miss Heart of the Bluegrass	Tap Dance, "The Joint Is Jumpin'"			
1990	Nancy Cox	Campbellsville	22	Miss Bowling Green	Popular Vocal, "Don't It Make My Brown Eyes Blue"			
1989	Melanie-Lynn Glasscock	Leitchfield	21	Miss Green River Valley	Baton Twirling, "If My Friends Could See Me Now"			
1988	Mikka Lynn Darby	Salyersville	19	Miss East Kentucky	Middle Eastern Dance			
1987	Elizabeth Gray McDowell	Prospect	21	Miss Jefferson County	Semi-classical Vocal, "Falling in Love with Love"			
1986	Melinda Katharine Cumberledge	Lexington	23	Miss Bluegrass Area	Semi-classical Vocal, "Till There Was You"		Non-finalist Talent Award	
1985	Laurie Janine Keller	Nippa	21	Miss Floyd County	Vocal / Ballet en Pointe, "Don't Cry For Me Argentina"	Top 10		Miss America Gillette Show Troupe. Laurie Janine Keller died at age 46 in her sleep at home in Ohio in October 2009.
1984	Kelly Lin Brumagen	Lexington	22	Miss Fayette County	Vocal, "Le Jazz Hot" from Victor/Victoria	Top 10	Dr. David. B. Allman Medical Scholarship	
1983	Lynn Whitney Thompson	Lexington	24	Miss Bluegrass Area	Popular Vocal, "Yesterday When I Was Young"	Top 10		
1982	Gwendolyn Suzanne Witten	Vine Grove	23	Miss Louisville	Semi-classical Vocal, "And This Is my Beloved"	Top 10	Preliminary Talent Award	
1981	Sheri Colleen Copeland	Benton	20	Miss Bluegrass Area	Popular Vocal, "Out Here On My Own" from Fame			
1980	Daphne Jean Cochran	Louisville	21	Miss Fairdale	Popular Vocal, "Bridges"			
1979	Kathryn Parker	Wilmore	21	Miss Lexington	Flute, "The Swiss Shepherd's Song"			
1978	Marcia Malone Bell	Lexington	21	Miss Lake Cumberland	Popular Vocal, "Can't Take My Eyes Off You"	Top 10		Aunt (by marriage) of Miss Kentucky 2007, Kaitlynne Postel
1977	Karen Gordon	Benton	21	Miss Murray State University	Chalk Drawing with Narration			
1976	Victoria Jane Harned	Leitchfield	21	Miss Lake Cumberland	Popular Vocal, "Send In the Clowns"		Non-finalist Talent Award	
1975	Marsha Ann Griffith	Greenup	22	Miss Ashland Area	Vocal / Trumpet, "I Can See Clearly Now"		Non-finalist Talent Award	
1974	Darlene Compton	Louisville	25	Miss Louisville	Vocal, "Mira" from Carnival!	3rd runner-up	Preliminary Talent Award	
1973	Lyda Lewis	Louisville	24	Miss Louisville	Vocal, "Sweet Inspiration" & "Where You Lead"			First Black Miss Kentucky
1972	Diana Moore	Pikeville		Miss Louisville		N/A		Successor to crown when Walters resigned
1972	Carolyn Walters	Louisville	19	Miss University of Louisville	Vocal, "Rock-a-Bye Your Baby with a Dixie Melody"			Represented Kentucky at Miss America 1973 pageant, but resigned soon after
1971	Robbie Lynn Halcomb	Scottsville	19	Miss Jeffersontown	Semi-classical Vocal, "Italian Street Song"			Contestant at Miss Teenage America 1968 pageant
1970	Cynthia Anne Bostick	Owensboro	18	Miss Owensboro	Vocal, "Life Is a One Way Street"			Appeared as Marcia Campbell on As the World Turns Cynthia Anne Bostick Georgeson died at age 70 on January 24, 2023, in Racine, Wisconsin.
1969	Louisa Ann Flook	Richmond	20	Miss Richmond	Dramatic Monologue from Little Moon of Alban by James Costigan			
1968	Janet Sue Hatfield	Jeffersontown	18	Miss Jeffersontown	Vocal, "I'm Glad There Is You"			
1967	Jo-Anne Clark	Louisville	19	Miss Jeffersontown	Vocal / Guitar, "Unchained Melody"			
1966	Janie Olmstead	New Castle	22	Miss New Castle	Modern Ballet Dance, "Peter Gunn Theme"			
1965	Rebecca Tollivar Snyder	Owensboro	20	Miss Lexington	Dramatic Monologue, "Portrayal of the Sphinx"			
1964	Linda Lenora Sawyer	Louisville	21	Miss Louisville	Vocal & Speech, "Stephen Foster Medley"	Top 10		Older sister of newscaster, Diane Sawyer
1963	Nell Garnett Owen	Bowling Green		Miss Bowling Green	Fashion Design			Former mayor of Prospect, Kentucky
1962	Nanci Rosalind Bowling	Campbellsville	21	Miss Harlan	Piano			
1961	Lee Willis Grigsby	Bardstown	18	Miss Louisville	Vocal, "Summertime"			
1960	Alice Chumbley	Jamestown	21	Miss Bowling Green	Dramatic Monologue from The Country Girl			
1959	Carol Fairchild Brown	Whitesburg	19	Miss Eastern State Teacher's College	Dramatic Reading			
1958	Sandra Sue Smith	Harlan			Pantomime / Dance, "Tweedle Dee"			
1957	Jane Marvin Brock	Liberty			Piano		Non-finalist Talent Award	
1956	Janene Carole Simpson	Louisville			Piano			
1955	Ann Shirley Gillock	Carrollton			Organ			
1954	Margaret Diane Hunt	Lexington			Dance			
1953	Emily "Tucky" Rucker	Berea			Vocal			
1952	Joy Williams	Lexington			Dance			
1951	Dottye Nuckols	Bowling Green			Vocal			
1950	Mary Louise Osborne	Wheelwright			Drama			
1949	Betty Joanne Haverstock	Louisville		Miss Louisville				
1948	Mildred Joanne Hollinger	Louisville		Miss Louisville				
1947	Evelyn L. Murray	Louisville		Miss Kentucky	Samba	Top 15	Preliminary Swimsuit Award	Multiple Kentucky representatives Contestants competed under local title at Miss America pageant
1947	Margaret Allen Hill	Louisville		Miss Louisville	Vocal / Piano, "It Had to Be You"			Multiple Kentucky representatives Contestants competed under local title at Miss America pageant
1946	Mary Madonna Smith	Jenkins		Miss Kentucky				Multiple Kentucky representatives Contestants competed under local title at Miss America pageant
1946	Patricia Alden Fenton	Louisville		Miss Louisville	Artistic Exhibition & Sketch	Top 16		Multiple Kentucky representatives Contestants competed under local title at Miss America pageant
1945	No Kentucky representative at Miss America pageant							
1944	No Kentucky representative at Miss America pageant							
1943	No Kentucky representative at Miss America pageant							
1942	No Kentucky representative at Miss America pageant							
1941	Dorothy Slatten	Lexington				Top 15		
1940	Dorothy Slatten	Lexington		Miss Kentucky		4th runner-up	Preliminary Swimsuit Award	Multiple Kentucky representatives Contestants competed under local title at Miss America pageant
1940	Violet Owen			Miss Western Kentucky				Multiple Kentucky representatives Contestants competed under local title at Miss America pageant
1939	Louise Holman	Pineville		Miss Kentucky				Multiple Kentucky representatives Contestants competed under local title at Miss America pageant Dorothy Slatten was the original winner but was disqualified due to being underage
1939	Mattigene Palmore	Lexington		Miss Lexington				Multiple Kentucky representatives Contestants competed under local title at Miss America pageant Dorothy Slatten was the original winner but was disqualified due to being underage
1938	Evelyn Cooper	Somerset			Vocal, "A-Tisket, A-Tasket"			
1937	Audrey Catherine Flaig	Bellevue						
1936	Charlet Bernice Hiteman	Newport		Miss Kentucky		Top 15		Multiple Kentucky representatives Contestants competed under local title at national pageant
1936	Jean Margaret Megerle	Fort Thomas	19	Miss Blue Grass		Top 15		Multiple Kentucky representatives Contestants competed under local title at national pageant
1935	Jean Margaret Megerle	Fort Thomas	18	Miss Kentucky	Vocal / Acrobatic Dance, "I'll Never Say Never Again"	2nd runner-up		
1934	No national pageant was held							
1933	Lucille Rader	Berea	14			Top 18		Lucille Rader Cyrus died at age 88 in Florida on February 16, 2016.
1932	No national pageants were held							
1931	No national pageants were held							
1930	No national pageants were held							
1929	No national pageants were held							
1928	No national pageants were held							
1927	No Kentucky representative at Miss America pageant							
1926	Gladys Imogene King	Louisville		Miss Louisville	N/A			Competed under local title at national pageant
1925	Mary Madeline O'Laughlin	Louisville		Miss Louisville	N/A	Top 15		Competed under local title at national pageant
1924	Juanita Hobbs	Louisville		Miss Louisville	N/A			Multiple Kentucky representatives Contestants competed under local title at national pageant
1924	Kathleen McElroy			Miss Paducah	N/A			Multiple Kentucky representatives Contestants competed under local title at national pageant
1923	Juanita Hobbs	Louisville		Miss Louisville	N/A			Competed under local title at national pageant
1922	Dorothy Heick	Louisville		Miss Louisville	N/A			Competed under local title at national pageant
1921	No Kentucky representative at Miss America pageant							
