= Chera-Lyn Cook =

American model (born 1976)

- Born: Loveta Cheralyn Cook; October 7, 1976 (age 50); London, Kentucky, U.S.
- Other name: Chera-Lyn Kennedy
- Beauty pageant titleholder
- Title: Miss Kentucky 1998
- Major competition: Miss America 1999 (4th Runner-Up)
- Website: http://www.chera-lynkennedy.com/

Loveta Cheralyn "Chera-Lyn" Cook (born October 7, 1976) is an American crowned Miss Kentucky 1998, was the first young woman from southeast Kentucky to win the Miss Kentucky title.

== Pageants ==
Representing the title of Miss Lexington, but claiming London, Kentucky, as her hometown, Cook had previously held several titles, including Miss Central Kentucky, Miss Fayette County, Miss Monticello, Miss Southeast Kentucky, National Sweetheart, and National All American Teen. A double preliminary winner at Miss Kentucky, Cook won talent preliminary and placed 4th runner-up to Miss America 1999.

== Awards and recognitions ==
Cook was recognized by the Joint Sessions of the Kentucky Legislature for volunteer work with at-risk youth and was the Kentucky School Psychologist of the Year in 2004. Her platform issue at Miss America, Children's Miracle Network, was later adopted by the Miss America Scholarship Organization as a national platform. She was also a Goodwill Ambassador for the Commonwealth of Kentucky.

Awards and achievements
Preceded by Lori Menshouse	Miss Kentucky; 1998	Succeeded by Heather French
