= 2019 Kentucky Secretary of State election =

- November 5, 2019
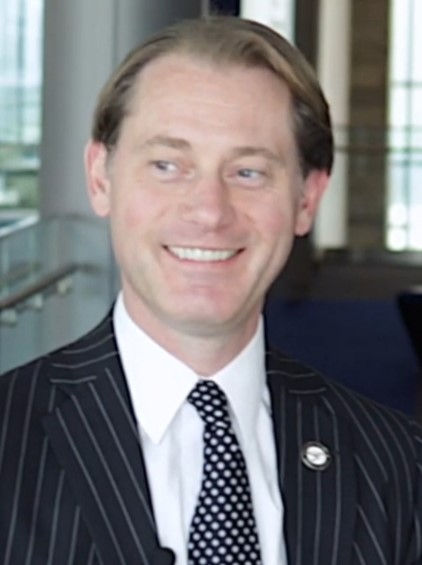

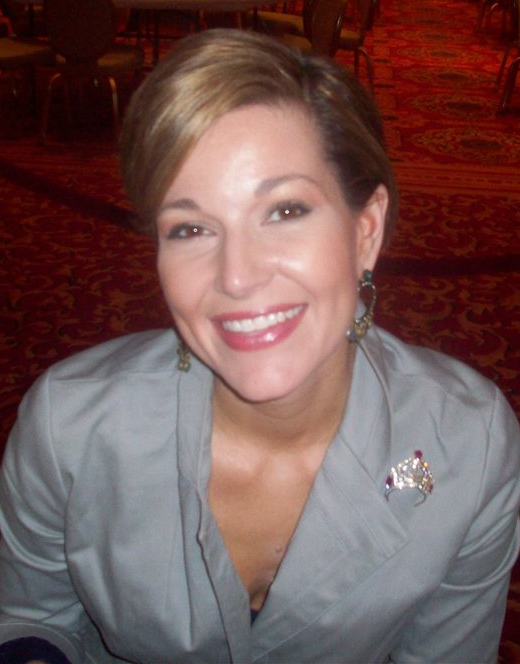
Nominee	Michael Adams	Heather French Henry
Party	Republican	Democratic
Popular vote	746,629	682,096
Percentage	52.3%	47.7%
- Adams: 50–60% 60–70% 70–80% 80–90% >90% French Henry: 50–60% 60–70% 70–80% 80-90% >90% Tie: 50% No data
Secretary of State before election
Alison Lundergan Grimes
Democratic
Elected Secretary of State
Michael Adams
Republican

The 2019 Kentucky Secretary of State election was held on November 5, 2019, to elect the secretary of state of Kentucky. Primary elections were held on May 21, 2019. Incumbent Democratic secretary Alison Lundergan Grimes was ineligible to run for a third term due to term limits, creating the first open election for secretary of state since 2003.

Republican nominee Michael Adams narrowly defeated Democratic nominee Heather French Henry. This was the only statewide race in Kentucky in 2019 besides the gubernatorial election in which the victory margin was single digits. It was also the only non-gubernatorial statewide election in Kentucky, Louisiana, or Mississippi (all of these states were staunchly Republican in 2019) where the Democrat achieved more than 45% of the vote in 2019.

== Democratic primary ==
=== Candidates ===
- Jason Belcher, U.S. Air Force veteran and writer
- Jason Griffith, teacher and businessman
- Heather French Henry, former Kentucky Commissioner of Veterans Affairs and former Miss America
- Geoff Sebesta, comic book artist

=== Results ===
Democratic primary results
Party	Candidate	Votes	%
Democratic	Heather French Henry	263,431	70.99
Democratic	Jason Belcher	47,930	12.92
Democratic	Jason Griffith	47,657	12.84
Democratic	Geoff Sebesta	12,087	3.26
Total votes		371,105	100.00

== Republican primary ==
=== Candidates ===
- Michael Adams, general counsel for the Republican Governors Association and former aide to U.S. senator Mitch McConnell
- Andrew English, former general counsel for the Kentucky Justice and Public Safety Cabinet and U.S. Navy veteran
- Stephen Knipper, cyber security expert, former Erlanger city councilor and nominee for secretary of state in 2015
- Carl Nett, former counterintelligence officer

=== Polling ===
Poll source	Date(s) administered	Sample size	Margin of error	Michael Adams	Andrew English	Steve Knipper	Carl Nett	Undecided
Cygnal	May 10–12, 2019	600	± 4.0%	11%	10%	7%	5%	68%

=== Results ===
Republican primary results
Party	Candidate	Votes	%
Republican	Michael Adams	94,417	41.27
Republican	Andrew English	62,680	27.39
Republican	Steve Knipper	41,369	18.08
Republican	Carl Nett	30,340	13.26
Total votes		228,806	100.00

== General election ==
=== Polling ===
Poll source	Date(s) administered	Sample size	Margin of error	Heather French Henry (D)	Michael Adams (R)	Undecided
Clarity Campaign Labs (D) (Note: Poll sponsored by Democratic Attorney General Association)	August 12–13, 2019	792	± 3.29%	52%	37%	9%

=== Results ===
2019 Kentucky secretary of state election
Party	Candidate	Votes	%	±%
Republican	Michael Adams	746,629	52.26%	+3.42
Democratic	Heather French Henry	682,096	47.74%	–3.42
Total votes		1,428,725	100.00%	
Republican gain from Democratic				
