= Heather French Henry =

American beauty pageant contestant and politician (born 1974)

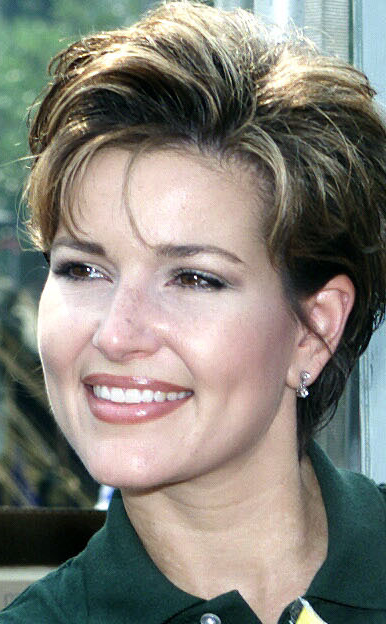
- French Henry in 2000

Commissioner of the Kentucky Department of Veterans Affairs
- In role July 1, 2014 – March 15, 2016
- Governor: Steve Beshear; Matt Bevin
- Preceded by: Ken Lucas
- Succeeded by: Norman E. Arflack

Second Lady of Kentucky
- In office October 27, 2000 – December 9, 2003
- Lieutenant Governor: Steve Henry
- Preceded by: Judi Patton
- Succeeded by: Ruth Ann Cox

Personal details
- Born: Heather Renee French; December 29, 1974 (age 51)
- Party: Democratic
- Spouse: Steve Henry (m. 2000)
- Children: 2
- Education: University of Cincinnati (BA, MDes)

Heather Renee French Henry (born December 29, 1974) is an American fashion designer, politician, veterans advocate and beauty pageant titleholder who was crowned Miss America 2000. She is married to former Kentucky Lieutenant Governor Steve Henry.

== Biography ==
Raised in Augusta, Kentucky, Heather French Henry graduated from the University of Cincinnati College of Design, Architecture, Art, and Planning. She competed in pageants through her teens, including the Miss Ohio pageant. The vocalist competed in the Miss Kentucky Pageant four times before winning the state title on her fifth attempt in 1999. In September 1999, Heather won the Miss America pageant, the first Miss Kentucky to do so. She was the second native of Kentucky to win the Miss America title after Venus Ramey won in 1944, competing as Miss District of Columbia. Heather spent the year as Miss America 2000 promoting the scholarship pageant program and advocated her cause of support of American veterans.

Heather's platform for her reign was raising awareness of homeless veterans; her father was a wounded veteran of the Vietnam War. She received numerous awards for her work with veterans, including Kentuckian of the Year by Kentucky Monthly.

On October 27, 2000, Heather married Kentucky Lieutenant Governor Steve Henry, 21 years her senior, in Louisville. The wedding led to controversy over state resources being expended as part of the wedding and planning. The Henrys repaid the state $3,200 for services related to their wedding rendered to them by state employees. The couple have two daughters, Harper Renee (born 2001) and Taylor Augusta (born 2003).

While driving in October 2003, French Henry struck and fatally injured Karola Stede, 44, a native of Germany and mother of four who was crossing against the traffic light in a Louisville intersection. French said that the accident deeply affected her, and she subsequently recounted her story in venues such as The Oprah Winfrey Show.

In November 2007, she was named to Kentucky Governor-elect Steve Beshear's transition team. On July 1, 2014, Beshear appointed Henry Commissioner of the Kentucky Department of Veterans Affairs. She was replaced by Governor Matt Bevin with retired Brigadier General Norman E. Arflack on March 15, 2016, with French Henry subsequently being appointed Deputy Commissioner of the Kentucky Department of Veterans Affairs.

French Henry was the 2019 Democratic nominee for Secretary of State of Kentucky. She lost the general election to Michael Adams.

She is a member of the National Society Daughters of the American Revolution.

== See also ==
- List of people from the Louisville metropolitan area
- List of beauty queen-politicians

Party political offices
Preceded by Alison Lundergan Grimes	Democratic nominee for Secretary of State of Kentucky; 2019	Succeeded by Buddy Wheatley
Awards and achievements
Preceded by Chera-Lyn Cook	Miss Kentucky; 1999	Succeeded by Shanna Kari Moore
Preceded by Nicole Johnson	Miss America; 2000	Succeeded by Angela Perez Baraquio
