= Yedda Romualdez =

Filipino politician and beauty pageant titleholder (born 1973)

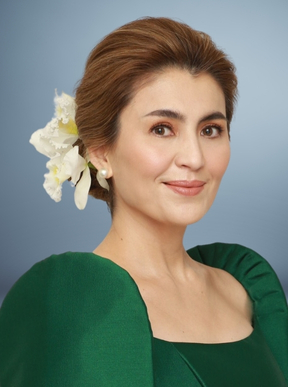
- Official portrait, 2025

Member of the Philippine House of Representatives for Tingog Party List
- Incumbent
- Assumed office June 30, 2019

Member of the Philippine House of Representatives from Leyte's 1st district
- In office June 30, 2016 – June 30, 2019
- Preceded by: Martin Romualdez
- Succeeded by: Martin Romualdez

President of the Congressional Spouses Foundation, Inc.
- In office July 25, 2022 – September 17, 2025
- Preceded by: Rowena Amara
- Succeeded by: Mary Ann Arcega

Personal details
- Born: Yedda Marie Mendoza Kittilstvedt; October 22, 1973 (age 52) Cebu City, Philippines
- Party: Tingog Sinirangan (partylist; 2018–present); Lakas (2015–present)
- Spouse: Martin Romualdez (m. 1999)
- Children: 4 (including Ferdinand Martin Jr. and Andrew Julian)
- Parents: Joseph Kittilstvedt (father); Maria Yedda Mendoza (mother)
- Education: Cebu Doctors' College (BS)

Yedda Marie Mendoza Kittilstvedt-Romualdez (Tagalog pronunciation: [ɾoˈmwɐldɛs], born October 22, 1973) is a Filipina politician, beauty queen, and nurse. She is currently serving as the representative of Tingog Party List since 2019. She had previously represented Leyte's 1st district from 2016 to 2019. Her four consecutive terms in Congress have been criticized as a potential violation of the Constitution. She is the wife of Martin Romualdez, who served as the Speaker of the House from 2022 to 2025.

She represented the Philippines at the Miss International 1996 pageant, where she placed in the Top 15.

== Pageantry ==
Romualdez first competed in the Supermodel of the World-Philippines pageant in 1991 where she was first runner-up to Lorena Pangan. She competed in the Binibining Pilipinas pageant in 1996, and became the country's representative in that year's Miss International competition in Japan, where she placed in the Top 15. After participating in Binibining Pilipinas, she was cast in a San Miguel Beer commercial titled "S-Capade".

== Political career ==
Romualdez was the representative of the first district of Leyte in the House of Representatives of the Philippines from 2016 to 2019. From 2019, she served as the first nominee of the partylist Tingog Sinirangan (now Tingog), and has served as its representative in Congress beginning in 2019. She was re-elected in 2022 but opted to become the sixth nominee in 2025 with her son Andrew Julian Romualdez as the first nominee. The partylist gained only three seats, effectively ending her term in 2025. However, following the resignation of Tingog's third to fifth nominees (Marie Josephine Calatrava, Alexis Yu, and Paul Richard Muncada), Romualdez was elevated to third nominee and reassumed her seat on July 18, 2025, eighteen days after the end of her previous term.

== Personal life ==
Romualdez' father, Joseph Kittilstvedt, is from Norway and her mother, Maria Yedda Mendoza Kittilstvedt, is from Cebu. She has four sisters and one brother. Romualdez graduated in nursing from the Cebu Doctors' College in Cebu City and is a registered nurse.

She met businessman Martin Romualdez in 1995 prior to her entering the Binibining Pilipinas 1996 pageant. They discreetly married under civil rites in Hong Kong in November 1999, with a public church wedding presided by Archbishop Pedro Dean following at Santuario de San Antonio in Forbes Park, Makati, a few meters from Martin's family home, on February 4, 2001. The church wedding was sponsored by Martin's aunt, former first lady Imelda Marcos, while his cousin Bongbong Marcos's sons Sandro and Simon respectively served as bible bearer and ring bearer. Martin served as the 24th Speaker of the House of Representatives from 2022 to 2025 and has served as a congressman from Leyte since 2019. They have four children. Their sons Ferdinand Martin "Marty" Romualdez Jr. and Andrew Julian Romualdez are also in politics, having been elected as a councilor of Tacloban and her fellow representative for Tingog Party List in 2025, respectively.

== Electoral history ==
Electoral history of Yedda Romualdez
Year	Office	Party	Votes received				Result
Year	Office	Party	Total	%	P.	Swing	Result
2016	Representative (Leyte–1st)	Lakas	147,477	73.66%	1st	—N/a	Won
2019	Representative (Party-list)	Tingog Sinirangan	391,211	1.40%	18th	—N/a	Won
2022	Representative (Party-list)	Tingog	886,959	2.41%	3rd	+1.01	Won
2025	Representative (Party-list)	Tingog	1,822,708	4.34%	3rd	+1.93	Won

House of Representatives of the Philippines
Preceded by Martin Romualdez	Member of the House of Representatives from Leyte; 2016-2019	Succeeded by Martin Romualdez
