= Binibining Pilipinas 1996 =

- Date: March 24, 1996
- Presenters: Martin Nievera; Regine Tolentino; Mylene Dizon; Trisha Salvador
- Entertainment: Victor Neri; Eraserheads
- Venue: Araneta Coliseum, Quezon City, Philippines
- Broadcaster: ABS-CBN
- Entrants: 36
- Placements: 12
- Winner: Aileen Leng Damiles; Las Piñas
- Congeniality: Helen Cabrera; Quezon City
- Photogenic: Aileen Leng Damiles; Las Piñas

Binibining Pilipinas 1996 was the 33rd edition of Binibining Pilipinas. It took place at the Araneta Coliseum in Quezon City, Metro Manila, Philippines on March 24, 1996.

At the end of the event, Joanne Santos crowned Aileen Damiles as Binibining Pilipinas Universe 1996, Caroline Subijano, Binibining Pilipinas World 1994, crowned Daisy Reyes as Binibining Pilipinas World 1996, and Gladys Dueñas crowned Yedda Marie Kittilsvedt as Binibining Pilipinas International 1996. Maria Sovietskaya Bacud was named First Runner-Up, while Sonia Santiago was named Second Runner-Up.

== Results ==
Color keys

- The contestant was a Semi-Finalist in an International pageant.
- The contestant did not place but won a Special Award in the pageant.

Placement	Contestant	International Placement
Binibining Pilipinas Universe 1996	Bb. #24 – Aileen Leng Damiles	Miss Photogenic – Miss Universe 1996
Binibining Pilipinas World 1996	Bb. #32 – Daisy Reyes	Miss Personality – Miss World 1996
Binibining Pilipinas International 1996	Bb. #34 – Yedda Marie Kittilsvedt	Top 15 – Miss International 1996
1st Runner-Up	Bb. #16 – Maria Sovietskaya Bacud	
2nd Runner-Up	Bb. #36 – Sonia Santiago	
Top 12	Bb. #1 – Maria Estrella Ramos; Bb. #9 – Amaneci Grace Ramos; Bb. #11 – Patricia Ann Bermudez; Bb. #13 – Kathleen Hipolito; Bb. #19 – Elaine Calva; Bb. #20 − Jaidee Salameda; Bb. #33 − Ana Marie Craig	

=== Special awards ===
Award	Contestant	Ref.
Miss Photogenic/AGFA	Bb. #24 – Aileen Damiles	
Miss Friendship	Bb. #29 – Helen Cabrera	
Miss Talent	Bb. #3 – Maria Vina Claudette Oca	
Best In Swimsuit	Bb. #24 – Aileen Damiles	
Best In Evening Gown	Bb. #32 – Daisy Reyes	
Miss Pond's Beautiful Skin	Bb. #34 – Yedda Marie Kittilsvedt	
Miss Lux	Bb. #33 – Ana Marie Craig	
Miss Close-Up Smile	Bb. #24 – Aileen Damiles	

== Contestants ==
36 contestants competed for the three titles.

No.	Contestant	City/Province	Placement
1	Maria Estrella Ramos	San Francisco, California	Top 12
2	Lady Vhee Dizon	Sampaloc, Manila	
3	Maria Vina Claudette Oca	Bacolod	
4	Maria Lourdes Mayor	Silang, Cavite	
5	Farah Penelope Sobremisana	Baao, Camarines Sur	
6	Sheryl Camus	Dasmariñas, Cavite	
7	Corazon Patawaran	Cavite	
8	Ruby Ann Olivares	Dasmariñas, Cavite	
9	Amaneci Grace Ramos	Baguio	Top 12
10	Maria Teresita Legacion	Makati	
11	Patricia Ann Bermudez	Toronto, Canada	Top 12
12	Maria Rowena Taylor	Cebu City	
13	Kathleen Hipolito	Manila	Top 12
14	Maria Carmelita Esmeli	Pasig City	
15	Ivelle Legaspi	Batangas City	
16	Sovietskaya Bacud	Parañaque	1st Runner-Up
17	Catherine Castañeda	Tarlac	
18	Grace Espiritu	Nueva Ecija	
19	Elaine Calva	Cavite City	Top 12
20	Jaidee Salameda	North America	Top 12
21	Maria Gracita de Ramos	Marikina	
22	Jennylin Salazar	Parañaque	
23	Mylene del Moral	Kawit, Cavite	
24	Aileen Leng Damiles	Las Piñas	Binibining Pilipinas Universe 1996
25	Jasmin Estrella Enriquez	Bulacan	
26	Geena Garcia	Silang, Cavite	
27	Marie Franchete Daria	Marikina	
28	Kathleen Segura	Quezon City	
29	Helen Cabrera	Quezon City	
30	Lilybel Sanchez	La Loma, Quezon City	
31	Mary Suzette Viar	Pasig	
32	Daisy Reyes	Parañaque	Binibining Pilipinas World 1996
33	Ana Marie Craig	Makati	Top 12
34	Yedda Marie Kittilstvedt	Cebu City	Binibining Pilipinas International 1996
35	Mary Jane Medina	Pateros	
36	Sonia Santiago	Cavite	2nd Runner-Up

== Notes ==
=== Post-pageant notes ===
- Aileen Damiles competed at Miss Universe 1996 in Las Vegas, Nevada and was unplaced. However, she won the Miss Photogenic Award via the internet.
- Daisy Reyes was also unplaced when she competed at Miss World 1996 in Bengaluru, India, but was awarded the Miss Personality award.
- Yedda Kittilsvedt competed at Miss International 1996 in Kanazawa, Japan, and was one of the Top 15 semifinalists.
- Maria Teresita Legacion competed at Mutya ng Pilipinas 1996, and was named Second Runner-Up. Legacion then became Mutya ng Pilipinas-Tourism International 1996.
