= Beauty pageant =

Competition mostly based on physical attributes

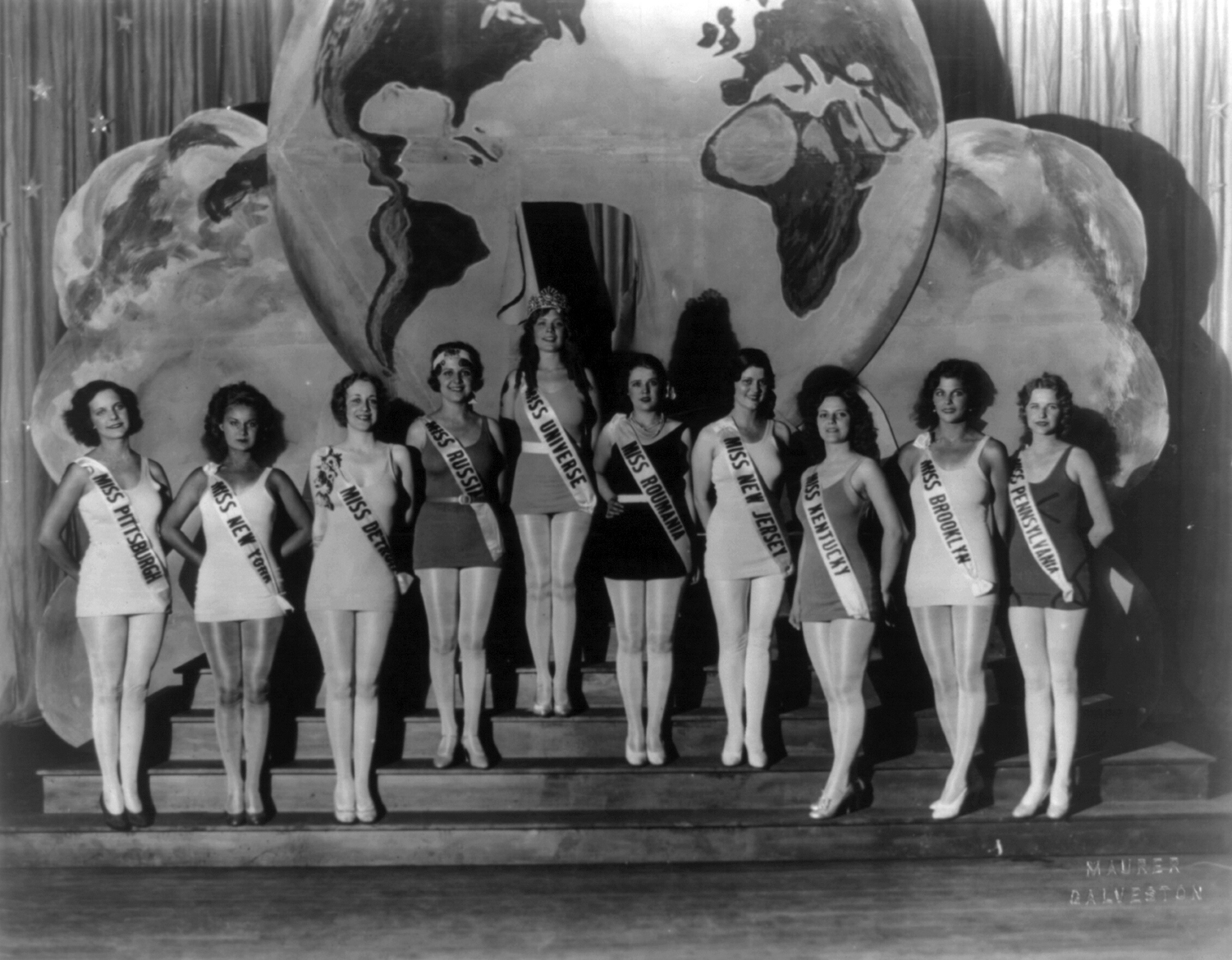
The winners of the International Pageant of Pulchritude 1930 competition

A beauty pageant is a competition in which the contestants are judged and ranked based on various physical and mental attributes. Per its name, beauty pageants traditionally focus on judging the contestants' physical attractiveness, sometimes solely so, but most modern beauty pageants have since expanded to also judge contestants based on "inner beauty"—their individual traits and characteristics, including personality, intelligence, aptitude, moral character, and charity. Though typically perceived as a female-oriented competition, male beauty pageants also exist, as do child beauty pageants for youth.

The term beauty pageant refers originally to the Big Four beauty pageants: Miss Universe, Miss World, Miss International, and Miss Earth. Thousands of beauty contests are held annually, but the Big Four are considered the most prestigious, and are widely covered and broadcast by news media. The earliest formal beauty pageants were held in the 19th century, although similar informal events date back to at least the post-classical period. Modern beauty pageants were first established in the early 20th century, with their popularity later boosted by the establishment of international pageants in the mid-20th century. Reforms of pageants in the 21st century marked a shift from primarily focusing on physical appearance to placing more weight on other characteristics.

Beauty pageants are generally multi-tiered, with local competitions feeding into the larger competitions; for example, the international pageants have hundreds or thousands of local competitions. The organizers of each pageant may determine the competition rules, including the age range of contestants. The rules may also require the contestants to be unmarried, and be virtuous, amateur, and available for promotions, besides other criteria. It may also set the clothing standards in which contestants will be judged, such as formal wear, swimsuit, sportswear, or designer clothing. Possible awards of beauty contests include titles, tiaras, crowns, sashes, bouquets, scepters, savings bonds, scholarships, and prize money. The winner of a beauty contest is generally called a beauty queen for female pageants and a beauty king for male pageants. Pageant titles are often subdivided into Miss, Mrs. or Ms., and Teen, to clearly identify the difference between pageant divisions. The rankings of the contestants are referred to as placements.

== History ==
=== Ancient history ===
Callisteia or Kallisteia (καλλιστεῖα) were ancient Greek beauty contests celebrated around Greece. One notable example was on the island of Lesbos, where women gathered in the sanctuary of Hera and a prize was awarded to the fairest among them. Another occurred in Arcadia during a festival honoring Demeter Eleusinia, where women known as Chrysophoroi (Χρυσοφόροι; "gold-bearers") competed. Athenaeus mentions Tenedos alongside Lesbos, suggesting similar beauty festivals were held there as well. In addition, he mentions that a beauty contest was held in Elis and involved only men, the most handsome received a suit of armor, dedicated it to Athena and was ceremonially adorned and escorted to the temple by his companions.

In addition to these aesthetic contests, there were other competitions in ancient Greece that blended beauty with physical excellence. These were the Euandria (εὐανδρία) and Euexia (εὐεξία), both part of agonistic festivals. The Euandria was likely a display of masculine beauty where physical size and strength played a key role in judging. The Euexia, by contrast, resembled a modern physique or fitness competition. It emphasized symmetry, muscle tone, posture, and overall health and vitality, rather than sheer bulk.

=== Early history ===
Georgiana Seymour, Duchess of Somerset, was crowned the 'Queen of Beauty' at the Eglinton Tournament of 1839.

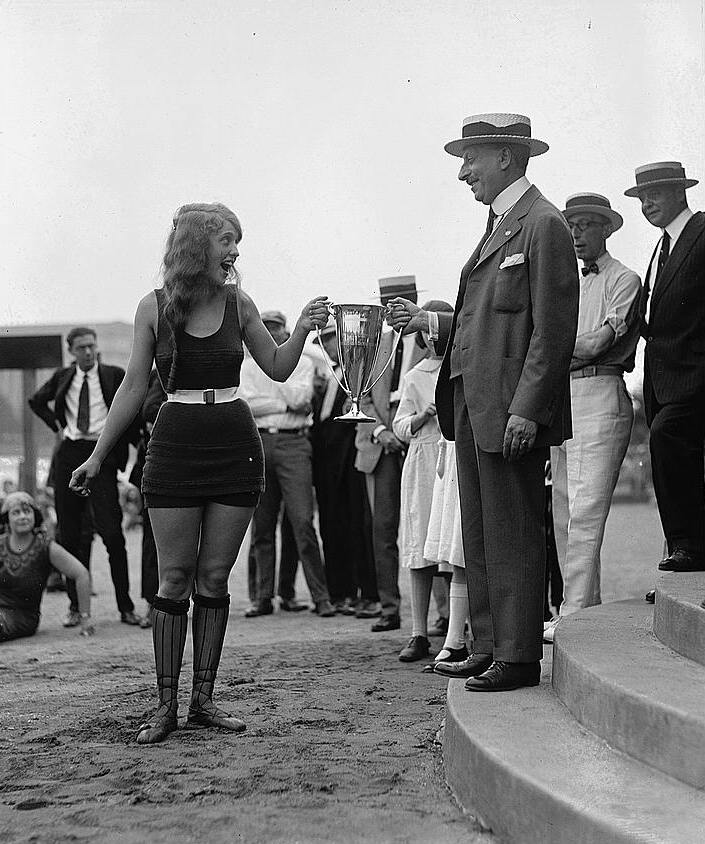
Woman receiving an award for winning a beauty pageant, 1922

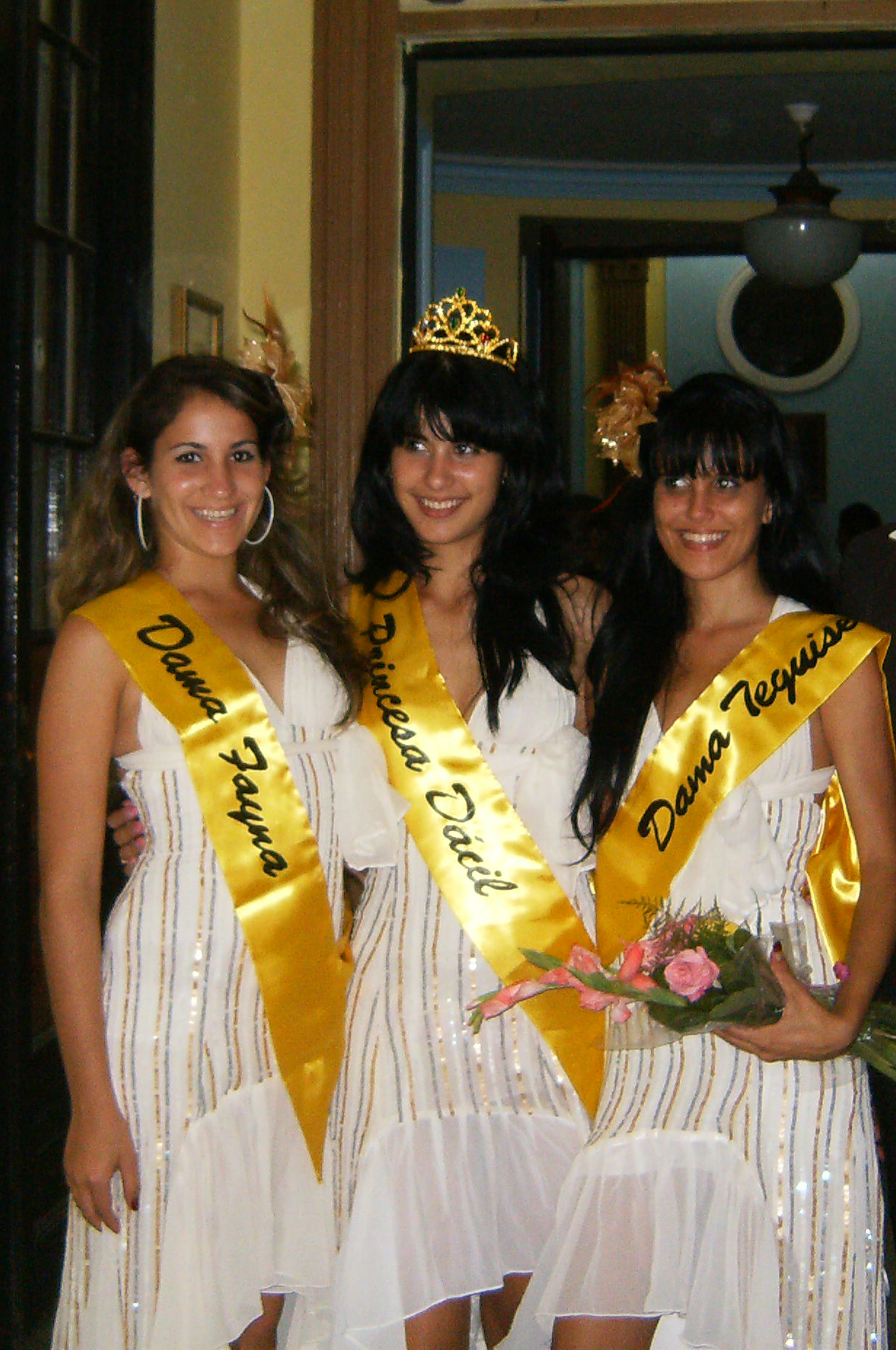
Celebration of the "Princess Dácil" contest at the Seventh Festival of Canarian Traditions in Cuba. In the center of the image, Mary Ann Álvarez Robbio, who was the winner of the contest in 2010.

Lone Star State selects beauties for 100 Year Pageant.

European festivals dating back to the Middle Ages provide the most direct lineage for beauty pageants. For example, English May Day celebrations always had the selection of a May Queen. In the United States, the May Day tradition of selecting a woman to serve as a symbol of beauty and community ideals continued, as young, beautiful women participated in public celebrations.

A beauty pageant was held during the Eglinton Tournament of 1839, organized by Archibald Montgomerie, 13th Earl of Eglinton, as part of a re-enactment of a medieval joust that was held in Scotland. The pageant was won by Georgiana Seymour, Duchess of Somerset, the wife of Edward Seymour, 12th Duke of Somerset, and sister of Caroline Norton, and she was proclaimed as the "Queen of Beauty". Beauty contests became more popular in the 1880s. In 1888, the title of 'beauty queen' was awarded to an 18-year-old Creole contestant at a pageant in Spa, Belgium. All participants had to supply a photograph and a short description of themselves to be eligible to enter and a final selection of 21 was judged by a formal panel. Such events were not regarded as respectable. In 1880, Rehoboth Beach, Delaware, held the first recorded beauty pageant in the United States, searching for "the most beautiful unmarried woman in our nation" and awarding her the title of Miss United States.

=== National and international pageants ===
Beauty contests came to be considered more respectable with the first modern "Miss America" contest held in 1921. The oldest pageant still in operation today is the Miss America pageant, which was organized in 1921 by a local businessman to entice tourists to Atlantic City, New Jersey. The pageant hosted the winners of local newspaper beauty contests in the "Inter-City Beauty" Contest, attended by over one hundred thousand people. Sixteen-year-old Margaret Gorman of Washington, D.C., was crowned Miss America 1921, having won both the popularity and beauty contests, and was awarded $100.

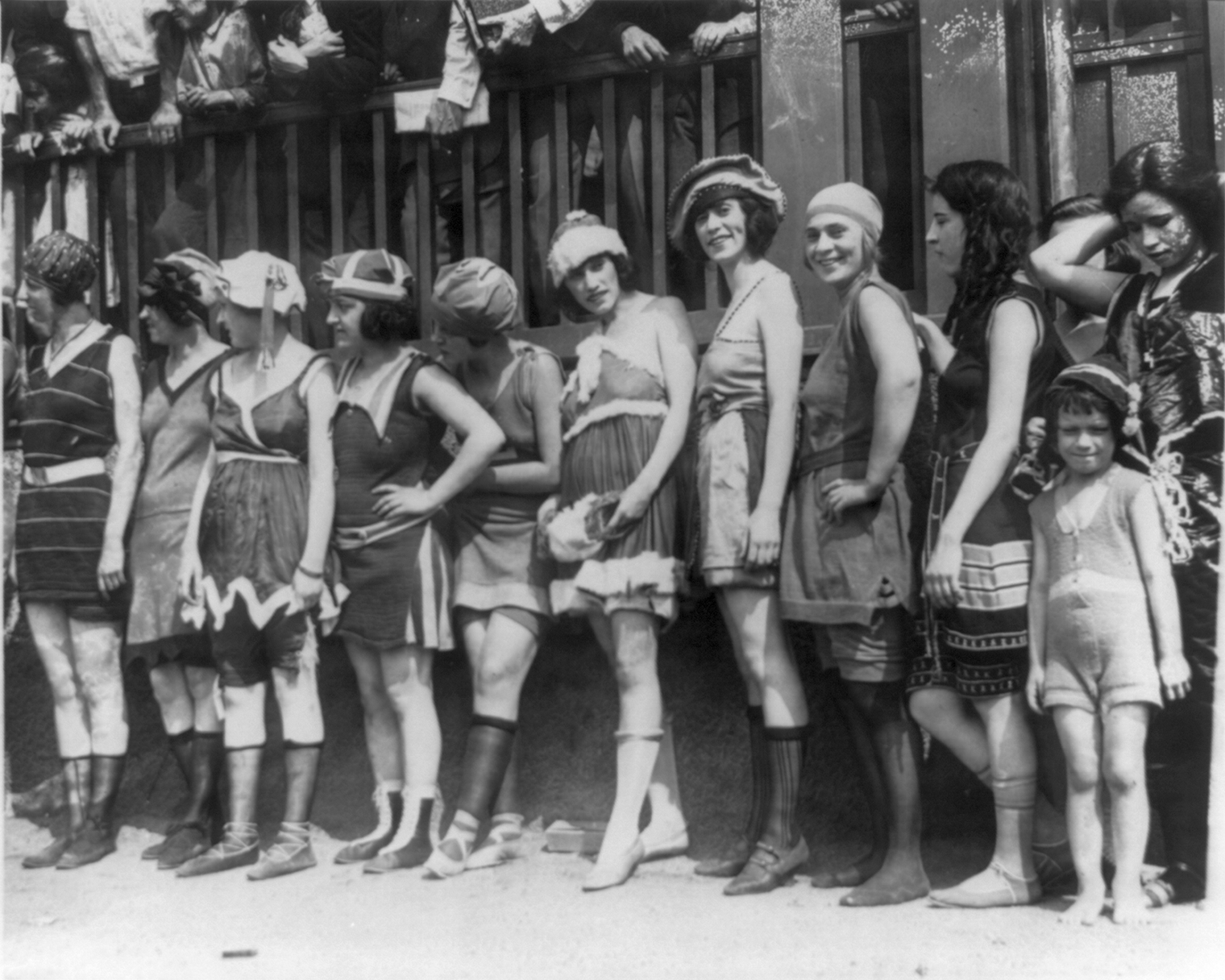
Bathing beauty contest, USA, 1920

In May 1920, promoter C.E. Barfield of Galveston, Texas, organized a new event known as "Splash Day" on the island. The event featured a "Bathing Girl Revue" competition as the centerpiece of its attractions. The event was the kick-off of the summer tourist season in the city and was carried forward annually. The event quickly became known outside of Texas and, beginning in 1926, the world's first international contest was added, known as the International Pageant of Pulchritude. This contest is said to have served as a model for modern pageants. It featured contestants from England, Russia, Turkey, and many other nations and the title awarded at the time was known as "Miss Universe". The event was discontinued in the United States in 1932 because of the Depression (the international competition was revived briefly in Belgium).

The popularity of the Miss America pageant prompted other organizations to establish similar contests in the 1950s and beyond. Some were significant while others were trivial, such as the National Donut Queen contest. The Miss World contest started in 1951, Miss Universe started in 1952, as did Miss USA. Miss International started in 1960. Miss Asia Pacific International, which started in 1968, is the first and oldest beauty pageant in Asia. The Miss Black America contest started in 1968 in response to the exclusion of African American women from the Miss America pageant. The Miss Universe Organization started the Miss Teen USA in 1983 for the 14–19 age group. Miss Earth started in 2001, which channels the beauty pageant entertainment industry to actively promote the preservation of the environment. These contests continue to this day.

== Major beauty pageants ==
Major international contests for women include the yearly Miss World competition (founded by Eric Morley in 1951), Miss Universe (founded in 1952), Miss International (founded in 1960), and Miss Earth (founded in 2001 with environmental awareness as its concern). These four are considered the biggest and most well known pageants, the four largest and most famous international beauty contests for single or unmarried women (except Miss Universe).

=== Big Four International Beauty Pageants ===
Founded	Pageant	Organizer	Headquarters	Bikini allowed	Bikini regulation
1951	Miss World	Miss World Organization	London, England	1951–2014; 2023–present	1951: The first winner, Kiki Håkansson from Sweden, was crowned in a bikini. Countries with religious traditions threatened to withdraw delegates, and Pope Pius XII condemned the crowning as sinful. 1952: Swimsuits toned down to more modest designs. 1996: Miss World contest was held in Bangalore, India, but the swimsuit round was shifted to Seychelles because of intense protests. 2013: The swimsuit round was dropped because of Islamist protests in Bali, Indonesia, where the contest took place. 2015: The Beach Fashion segment of the pageant was dropped.
1952	Miss Universe	JKN Legacy Inc. JKN Global Group (50%) Legacy Holding Group USA Inc. (50%)	Samut Prakan, Thailand New York City, United States Mexico City, Mexico	1997–present	1952: Bikinis banned. 1997: Contestants allowed to wear bikinis. 2021: Bikinis made optional. Contestants are allowed to wear burkinis during swimsuit competition.
1960	Miss International	International Cultural Association	Tokyo, Japan	1960–2022	1964: Bikinis made mandatory. 2023: The swimsuit parade to replaced by Lingerie parade.
2001	Miss Earth	Carousel Productions	Manila, Philippines	2003–present	2003: Vida Samadzai from Afghanistan participating in a bikini caused an uproar in her home country.2017: The "Beauty of Form and Figure" preliminary judging in Miss Earth 2017 was introduced where the delegates walked in white two-piece bikinis while their faces were covered by a white veil to focus the judgment on the body figures in this portion.

== Big Four dethronements and resignations ==
Dethronements and resignations are rare for the Big Four pageant winners, but when it does occur, it creates media attention.

The Miss World pageant has had 3 cases of dethronement or resignation instances:

- In 1973, Marjorie Wallace from the United States, who was crowned Miss World and once stated that "as Miss World I can get laid with any man I pick", dated a string of celebrities including George Best. She was dethroned three months after she was crowned.
- In Miss Universe, Oxana Fedorova of Russia was crowned Miss Universe 2002 and was dethroned four months later, as she was unable to fulfill her obligations. She was the first to be dethroned in the history of Miss Universe. She was replaced by first runner-up Justine Pasek of Panama.
- After being crowned Miss Wales and then Miss United Kingdom, Helen Morgan, competed and won Miss World 1974. However she was discovered to be a mother and was named in a divorce case. This led to her resigning four days after she was crowned. She was replaced by first runner-up of South Africa, Anneline Kriel.
- Gabriela Brum of Germany had the shortest reign in Miss World history when she resigned her title 18 hours after being crowned Miss World 1980. She indicated that her boyfriend disapproved of the contest, but it was later revealed that she had posed for naked photographs; she later relocated to the United States and modelled nude for Playboy. Second place Kimberley Santos of Guam replaced Brum by default.

In its early years, there were two instances where the reigning Miss Universe opted to resign from her position: Armi Kuusela, Miss Universe 1952 from Finland, who held the distinction of being the first Miss Universe winner to give up her crown in less than a year to marry Filipino businessman Virgilio Hilario while Amparo Muñoz, Miss Universe 1974 of Spain refused to travel to Japan and instead resigned after six months of her reign. However, since the pageant had no concrete rule on resignation at that time, they were allowed to keep their titles.

In Miss Earth, the 2002 winner, Dzejla Glavovic of Bosnia and Herzegovina was dethroned of her crown six months into her reign, after she failed to show up at several environmental events. According to Carousel Productions, organizer of the Miss Earth contest, Glavovic was dethroned because of "her inability to fulfill the duties and responsibilities as the Miss Earth titleholder, in accordance with the rules and regulations set forth in the Miss Earth contract that she signed." She was succeeded by first runner-up Winfred Omwakwe of Kenya as Miss Earth 2002.

In Miss International, Ikumi Yoshimatsu, Miss International 2012 was the first titleholder of the pageant from Japan to be dethroned shortly before the end of her reign. She was ordered by the International Culture Association (Miss International organizer) to skip the succession ceremony and "play sick and shut up" out of fear of scandal. The Miss International organizer cited the reason for her dethronement was due to her involvement in a contract dispute with a talent agency in which she claimed that she was pressured to sign by Burning Productions, a film production company which is rumored to be linked with the Japanese underworld, but she refused and went ahead by starting her own company. Yoshimatsu filed criminal charges against one of Japan's most powerful talent agency executives, Genichi Taniguchi of Burning Productions, for allegedly stalking, intimidating, and harassing her.

== Diversity ==
The diversity of contestants and winners has both increased since the inception of beauty pageants. In 1945, Bess Myerson, an American politician, model, and television actress, became the first Jewish person to win the Miss America title in Atlantic City and to this day remains the only Jewish person to have received the crown. Her success in winning the title was hugely symbolic and personal to Jewish people at that time because it was in the direct aftermath of the Holocaust. In 1959, Japanese model Akiko Kojima became the first woman of color to win the Miss Universe title. Her success marked the beginning of a shift away from white women as the global female beauty ideal. The continued success of Asian women in American and international beauty pageants has signaled that white women are no longer considered the beauty ideal. In 1983, Vanessa Williams, an American singer, actress, and fashion designer, gained recognition as being the first black woman to receive the Miss America title. In 1991, Lupita Jones, a Mexican actress and television producer, became the first Mexican person to win Miss Universe.

Besides the international beauty pageants, numerous minor competitions exist throughout the world, displaying the different perceptions of beauty. Some examples of criteria to select beauty queens that are unique to a certain culture. The Miss India USA pageant uses Indian history and traditional craft skills as its specialties, while the Miss Howard University competition takes advantage of the principles of "black beauty". The winner is often viewed as a model for the "ideal" community member. Through the competitions, the contestants can learn how to present themselves in public and how to cultivate certain traits such as confidence or poise. In some cases, the competitors are selected to act as a representative on behalf of the community. In the African American community of Howard University, the selected Miss Howard University served as advocates for the Civil Rights Movement in the decades following the 1960s. Additionally, the Miss Landmine competition situated in Angola allow victims to serve as advocates on behalf of other victims of mining accidents.

Researchers suggest that the emergence of beauty pageants in countries outside the United States is linked to an economic boom geared towards a more consumeristic lifestyle. "In India, the growth of the personal care industry coincided with increased participation in national beauty pageants. Additionally, after China hosted about 6 international beauty pageants in 2004, the beauty industry increased in influence in the area. At the same time, the number of regional beauty pageants in the country increased.

== Criticism ==
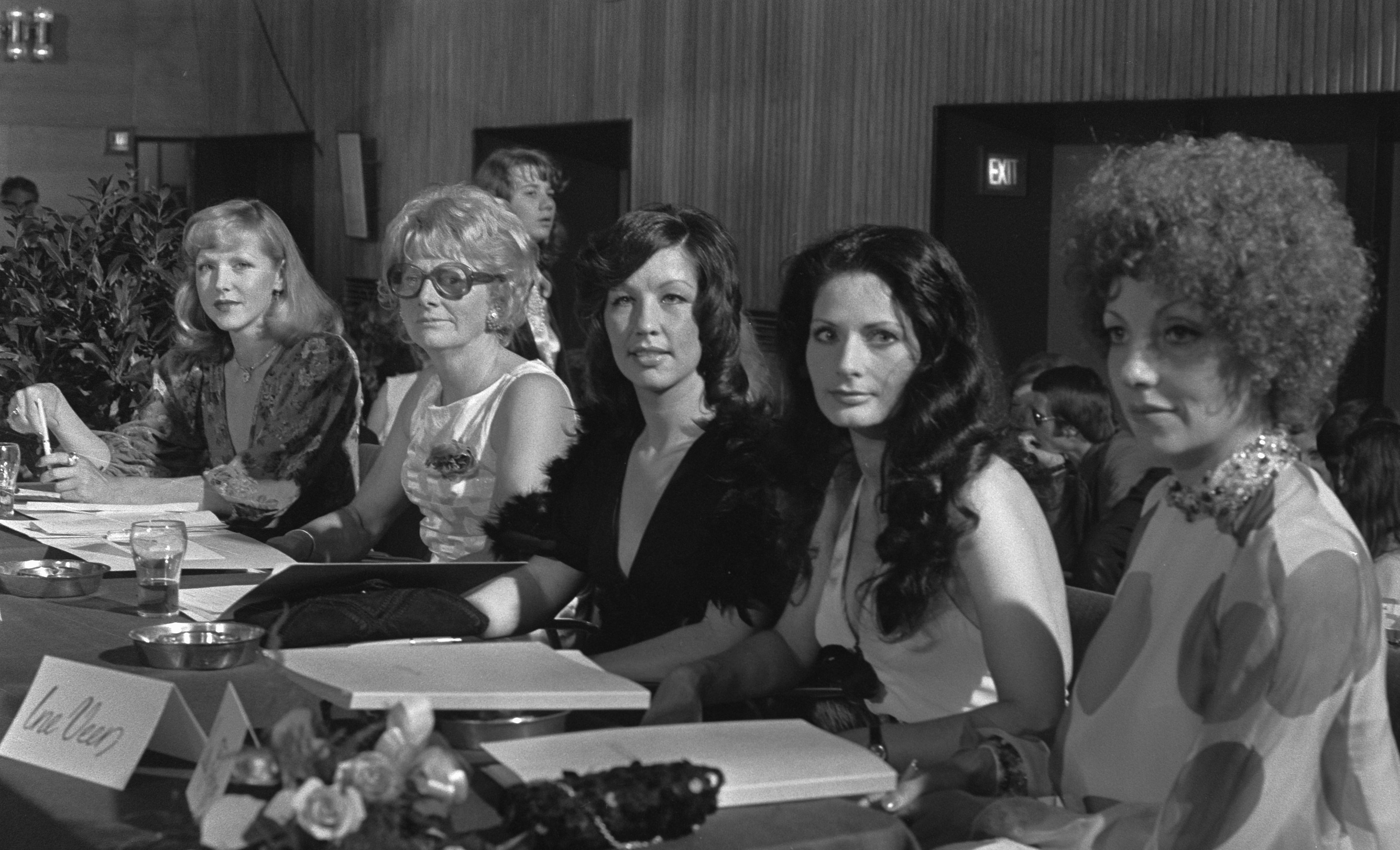
The panel of judges for the 1973 Miss Amsterdam pageant

Critics of beauty pageants argue that such contests reinforce the idea that girls and women should be valued primarily for their physical appearance, and that this puts tremendous pressure on women to conform to conventional beauty standards by spending time and money on fashion, cosmetics, hair styling, and even cosmetic surgery. They say that this pursuit of physical beauty even encourages some women to diet to the point of harming themselves.

The London Feminist Network argues that rather than being empowering, beauty pageants do the opposite: denying women's full humanity by subjecting them to objectification and by maintaining that their primary purpose is to be attractive. Beginning in 1981, the International Year of the Disabled Person, campaigners in Australia targeted beauty pageants in order to, in the words of activist Leslie Hall, "challenge the notion of beauty" and "reject the charity ethic." High-profile demonstrations led to some charities abandoning their use of such contests for fundraising and also saw some remove offensive language from their organisational titles.

Another criticism is in the way beauty pageant is quantifiably scored as highlighted by the "Myth of the Perfect 10". Beauty becomes a numerical coefficient in ranking contestants, and this type of scoring still remains followed as a system even in nationwide beauty pageants such as Miss America.

Researchers suggest that these events strengthen skills, such as interpersonal communications, self-assurance, and public speaking, which prove to be useful in future career paths.

=== Swimsuit competition ===
The requirement for contestants to wear a swimsuit was a controversial aspect of the various competitions. The controversy was heightened with the increasing popularity of the bikini after its introduction in 1946. The bikini was banned for the Miss America contest in 1947 because of Roman Catholic protesters. When the Miss World contest started in 1951, there was an outcry when the winner was crowned in a bikini. Pope Pius XII condemned the crowning as sinful, and countries with religious traditions threatened to withdraw delegates. The bikini was banned for future and other contests. It was not until the late 1990s that they became permitted again, but still generated controversy when finals were held in countries where bikinis (or swimsuits in general) were socially disapproved. For example, in 2003, Vida Samadzai from Afghanistan caused an uproar in her native country when she participated in the Miss Earth 2003 contest in a red bikini. She was condemned by the Afghan Supreme Court, saying such a display of the body goes against Islamic law and Afghan culture. In 2013, the swimsuit round of the Miss World contest was dropped because of Islamist protests in Bali (Indonesia), where the contest took place. In 2014, the Miss World contest eliminated the swimsuit competition from its pageant. In 2018, Miss America eliminated the swimsuit competition after 97 years.

In 2017, Carousel Productions was criticized for objectifying women during the Miss Earth 2017 competition where delegates wore swimsuits during the event with their faces concealed by a veil in the Beauty of Figure and Form, a segment first introduced in the Miss Philippines Earth 2017 pageant. It was one of the three preliminary judging segments of the pageant that include Poise and Beauty of Face and Environmental and Intelligence Competition. The organizers defended the "beauty of figure and form" segment and released a statement that the said round was intended to promote strict impartiality during pre-judging by focusing on the contestants' curves, execution and not beautiful face.

== Scandals ==
There have been numerous scandals in the beauty pageant industry and they continue to emerge as beauty pageants become more known to the public. In December 2017, HuffPost published emails written by then-Miss America CEO Sam Haskell that disparaged former pageant contestants, making vulgar references to their weight and personal lives. Due to the release of these emails to the public, Haskell and several other board members resigned from their positions.

Laura Zúñiga, former Miss Hispanic America, was detained with her boyfriend and six other people, and charged with racketeering, drug trafficking, weapons violations, and money laundering. When apprehended, they had multiple handguns and roughly $53,000 in cash.

At the Miss Teen USA 2007 pageant, Caitlin Upton gained international notoriety for her convoluted and nonsensical response to a question posed to her during the August 2007 national pageant. During the pageant, judge Aimee Teegarden asked: "Recent polls have shown a fifth of Americans can't locate the U.S. on a world map. Why do you think this is?". Upton responded:

I personally believe that U.S. Americans are unable to do so because, uh, some, uh, people out there in our nation don't have maps and, uh, I believe that our education like such as in South Africa and, uh, the Iraq, everywhere like such as, and, I believe that they should, our education over here in the U.S. should help the U.S., uh, or, uh, should help South Africa and should help the Iraq and the Asian countries, so we will be able to build up our future. For our children.

As a guest on NBC's The Today Show, Upton told Ann Curry and Matt Lauer that she was overwhelmed when asked the question and did not comprehend it correctly.

== See also ==
- List of beauty pageants
- List of beauty queen-politicians
- Swimsuit competition
- Child beauty pageant
- Miss Captivity Pageant
- Debutante
- Ball culture

== Bibliography ==
- Banet-Weiser, Sarah. "The Most Beautiful Girl in the World: Beauty Pageants and National Identity". (Berkeley: University of California Press, 1999)
- Bell, Myrtle P., Mary E. McLaughlin, and Jennifer M. Sequeira. "Discrimination, Harassment, and the Glass Ceiling: Women Executives as Change Agents". Journal of Business Ethics. 37.1 (2002): 65–76. Print.
- Burgess, Zena, and Phyllis Tharenou. "Women Board Directors: Characteristics of the Few". Journal of Business Ethics. 37.1 (2002): 39–49. Print.
- Ciborra, Claudio U. "The Platform Organization: Recombining Strategies, Structures, and Surprises". Organization Science. 7.2 (1996): 103–118. Print.
- Harvey, Adia M. "Becoming Entrepreneurs: Intersections of Race, Class, and Gender at the Black Beauty Salon". Gender and Society. 19.6 (2005): 789–808. Print.
- Huffman, Matt L., and Philip N. Cohen. "Occupational Segregation and the Gender Gap in Workplace Authority: National versus Local Labor Markets". Sociological Forum. 19.1 (2004): 121–147. Print.
- Lamsa, Anna-Maija, and Teppo Sintonen. "A Discursive Approach to Understanding Women Leaders in Working Life". Journal of Business Ethics. 34.3/4 (2001): 255–267. Print.
- Liben, Lynn S., Rebecca Bigler, Diane N Ruble, Carol Lynn Martin, and Kimberly K. Powlishta. "Conceptualizing, Measuring, and Evaluating Constructs and Pathways". Developmental Course of Gender Differentiation. 67.2 i-183. Print.
- Sones, Michael. "History of the Beauty Pageant". Beauty Worlds: The Culture of Beauty (2003): n. pag. Web. 4 November 2009.
- Wilk, Richard. "The Local and the Global in the Political Economy of Beauty: From Miss Belize to Miss World". Review of International Political Economy. 2.1 (1995): 117–134. Print.
