= Miss America 2027 =

99th edition of the Miss America competition

- Miss America 2027, Regan Hutsell
- Date: September 6, 2026
- Presenters: Billy Gilman; Jen Hale
- Venue: Palm Beach County Convention Center, West Palm Beach, Florida
- Broadcaster: Miss America Website (Note: On behalf of Pageant Vision streaming website); YouTube (Note: Via Miss America's Official YouTube Channel)
- Entrants: 52
- Placements: 11
- Winner: Regan Hutsell; Texas
- Congeniality: Adella Harris, Montana

Miss America 2027 was the 99th Miss America pageant, held on September 6, 2026, at the Palm Beach County Convention Center in West Palm Beach, Florida.

At the end of the event, Cassie Donegan of New York crowned Regan Hutsell of Texas as her successor, marking the state's fourth overall victory in the pageant.

== Background ==
On May 7, 2026, it was announced that the competition would take place between August 28–September 6, 2026, in West Palm Beach, Florida, at the Palm Beaches. Preliminary competitions took place at the Kravis Center for the Performing Arts, with the crowning taking place at the Palm Beach County Convention Center.

== Results ==
=== Placements ===
Placement	Contestant
Miss America 2027	Regan Hutsell (Texas)
1st Runner-Up	Shelby Bordelon (Louisiana)
2nd Runner-Up	Kate Dimmett (Illinois)
3rd Runner-Up	Sharlize True Trujillo (California)
4th Runner-Up	Evelyn Smith (District of Columbia)
Top 11	Carly Yoshida (Hawaii); McKenzie Kerry (Iowa); Jane Granberry (Mississippi); Madison Oh (New York); Lindsay Jones (South Carolina); Erika Dalton (Utah)

== Awards ==
=== Preliminary Awards ===
Awards	Contestants
Evening Gown	Iowa – McKenzie Kerry; Louisiana – Shelby Bordelon; Mississippi – Jane Granberry
Fitness	District of Columbia – Evelyn Smith; New Jersey – Kylie Wright; Texas – Regan Hutsell
Talent	New Jersey – Kylie Wright; Texas – Regan Hutsell; Utah – Erika Dalton

=== Quality of Life Community Service Awards ===
Results	Contestants
Winner	Florida – Alexandra de Roos
1st Runner-Up	Arizona – Victoria Vredevoogd
2nd Runner-Up	Missouri – Tabitha Crain
Finalists	Alabama – Ruby Tilghman
Finalists	Georgia – Sophia Wootten
Finalists	Illinois – Kate Dimmett
Finalists	Oregon – Alyssa Defillipo
Finalists	Pennsylvania – Stephanie Skinner
Finalists	South Carolina – Lindsay Jones
Finalists	Tennessee – Makalyn Heaslett

=== Special Awards ===
Award	Contestant
Miss Congeniality/Spirit of Sisterhood	Montana – Adella Harris
AHA Go Red for Women Leadership Award Winner	New Hampshire – Lauren Plank

== Contestants ==
The 52 confirmed contestants will compete for the title.

State/District	Contestant	Age	Hometown	Talent	Placement	Special Awards	Notes
Alabama	Ruby Tilghman	22	Panama City, FL	Vocal		Quality of Life Award Finalist	Previously Miss Florida's Outstanding Teen 2021
Alaska	Nora Andrews	20	Seward	HER Story			
Arizona	Victoria Vredevoogd	25	Chandler	Operetta		Quality of Life Award Finalist	
Arkansas	Ava Weeks	20	Conway	Vocal			
California	Sharlize True Trujillo	22	Los Angeles	Dance	3rd runner-up		
Colorado	Gabrielle Burns	23	Parker	Dance			
Connecticut	Christa Steiner	27	Hebron	Vocal			
Delaware	Anaya Harrison	24	Wilmington	Piano			
District of Columbia	Evelyn Smith	25	Oklahoma City	Dance	4th runner-up	Preliminary Fitness	Previously Miss Oklahoma's Outstanding Teen 2017; Top 9 and Preliminary Evening Wear/OSQ Winner at Miss America's Outstanding Teen 2018
Florida	Alexandra de Roos	23	Winter Haven	Contemporary Ballet		Quality of Life Award Finalist	
Georgia	Sophia Wootten	21	Peachtree City	Vocal		Quality of Life Award Finalist	
Hawaii	Carly Yoshida	26	Waikoloa	Hula	Top 11		Previously Miss Hawaii's Outstanding Teen 2016
Idaho	Déja Fitzwater	21	Portland, OR	Jazz Vocal			Previously National American Miss Teen 2024-2025; Previously Miss Oregon's Outstanding Teen 2022; Student at the University of Idaho
Illinois	Kate Dimmett	23	Zionsville, IN	Violin	2nd runner-up	Quality of Life Award Finalist	Previously Miss Indiana's Outstanding Teen 2021
Indiana	Ellise Edwards	22	Corydon	Lyrical Dance			
Iowa	McKenzie Kerry	27	Des Moines	Vocal	Top 11	Preliminary Evening Gown	Previously Miss Iowa USA 2024; Top 20 & People's Choice Winner at Miss USA 2024
Kansas	Sophie Lewis	23	Kansas City	Vocal			Previously Miss International 2024
Kentucky	Reagan Earlywine	24	Paris	Dance			
Louisiana	Shelby Bordelon	23	Sunshine	Vocal	1st runner-up	Preliminary Evening Gown	
Maine	Ruthie Gusley	19	Phillips	Acrobatics			
Maryland	Gianna Romero	21	Joppatowne	Baton Twirling			
Massachusettes	Ashlyn Mercier	25	Oxford	Contemporary Dance			
Michigan	Grace Hanke	19	Hazel Park	Vocal			
Minnesota	Anna Brennan	20	Byron	Classical Ballet en Pointe			
Mississippi	Jane Granberry	23	Hattiesburg	Jazz Dance	Top 11	Preliminary Evening Gown	Previously Miss Mississippi's Outstanding Teen 2019-2020
Missouri	Tabitha Crain	24	Strafford	Gymnastics Routine		Quality of Life Award Finalist	Previously Miss Missouri Volunteer 2025; Top 16 at Miss Volunteer America 2026
Montana	Adella Harris	19	Helena	Lyrical Ballet		Miss Congeniality	
Nebraska	Lexi Nolda	22	North Platte	Contemporary Dance			
Nevada	Mariah Larronde	27	Henderson	Vocal			
New Hampshire	Lauren Plank	21	Marlborough, MA	Jazz Dance		AHA Go Red for Women Leadership Award Overall Winner	
New Jersey	Kylie Wright	20	Egg Harbor Township	Karate		Preliminary Fitness Preliminary Talent	
New Mexico	Katarina Blakeslee	26	Albuquerque	Vocal & Guitar			
New York	Madison Oh	21	Avon, CT	Lyrical Dance	Top 11		Eligible as a student at Columbia University
North Carolina	Lauryn Mallard	26	Advance	Lyrical Dance			
North Dakota	Emma Tong	23	Williston	Lyrical Dance			Previously Miss North Dakota's Outstanding Teen 2021
Ohio	Lexie Miller	23	Newark	Vocal			
Oklahoma	Jaselyn Rossman	22	Sapulpa	Jazz Dance			Previously Miss Oklahoma Teen USA 2023; Top 20 at Miss Teen USA 2023
Oregon	Alyssa Defillipo	26	Klamath Falls	Vocal		Quality of Life Award Finalist	
Pennsylvania	Stephanie Skinner	21	Philadelphia	Tap Dance		Quality of Life Award Finalist	Previously Miss New York Teen USA 2023; 1st runner-up at Miss Teen USA 2023; Previously Miss High School America 2021
Puerto Rico	Annika Schneider	21	San Juan	HER Story			Previously Miss North Carolina's Teen 2023. Originally 3rd runner-up at state, appointed title after Hanley House won Miss America's Teen 2024
Rhode Island	Mia Daley	19	East Greenwich	Vocal			Previously Miss Rhode Island's Teen 2023
South Carolina	Lindsay Jones	26	Charleston	HER Story	Top 11	Quality of Life Award Finalist	
South Dakota	Kianna Healy	23	Hartford	Vocal			Previously Miss South Dakota's Outstanding Teen 2021
Tennessee	Makalyn Heaslett	27	Nashville	Tap Dance		Quality of Life Award Finalist	
Texas	Regan Hutsell	25	Porter	Jazz Dance	Winner	Preliminary Fitness Preliminary Talent	Former Radio City Rockette
Utah	Erika Dalton	26	St. George	Classical Violin	Top 11	Preliminary Talent	
Vermont	Hannah Roque	26	Middlebury	Vocal			Daughter of Miss Vermont 1996, Nicole Juvan
Virginia	Maddie Merchant	22	Lebanon	Clogging			
Washington	Natalie Worthy	23	Battle Ground	Vocal			
West Virginia	Elizabeth Romanek	24	Wheeling	Jazz Dance			
Wisconsin	Jordenne Demiree Butler	27	Onalaska	Jazz Dance			Previously Miss Wisconsin's Outstanding Teen 2015
Wyoming	Alyssa Medina	22	Cheyenne	HER Story			
