= Miss America 2025 =

97th edition of the Miss America competition

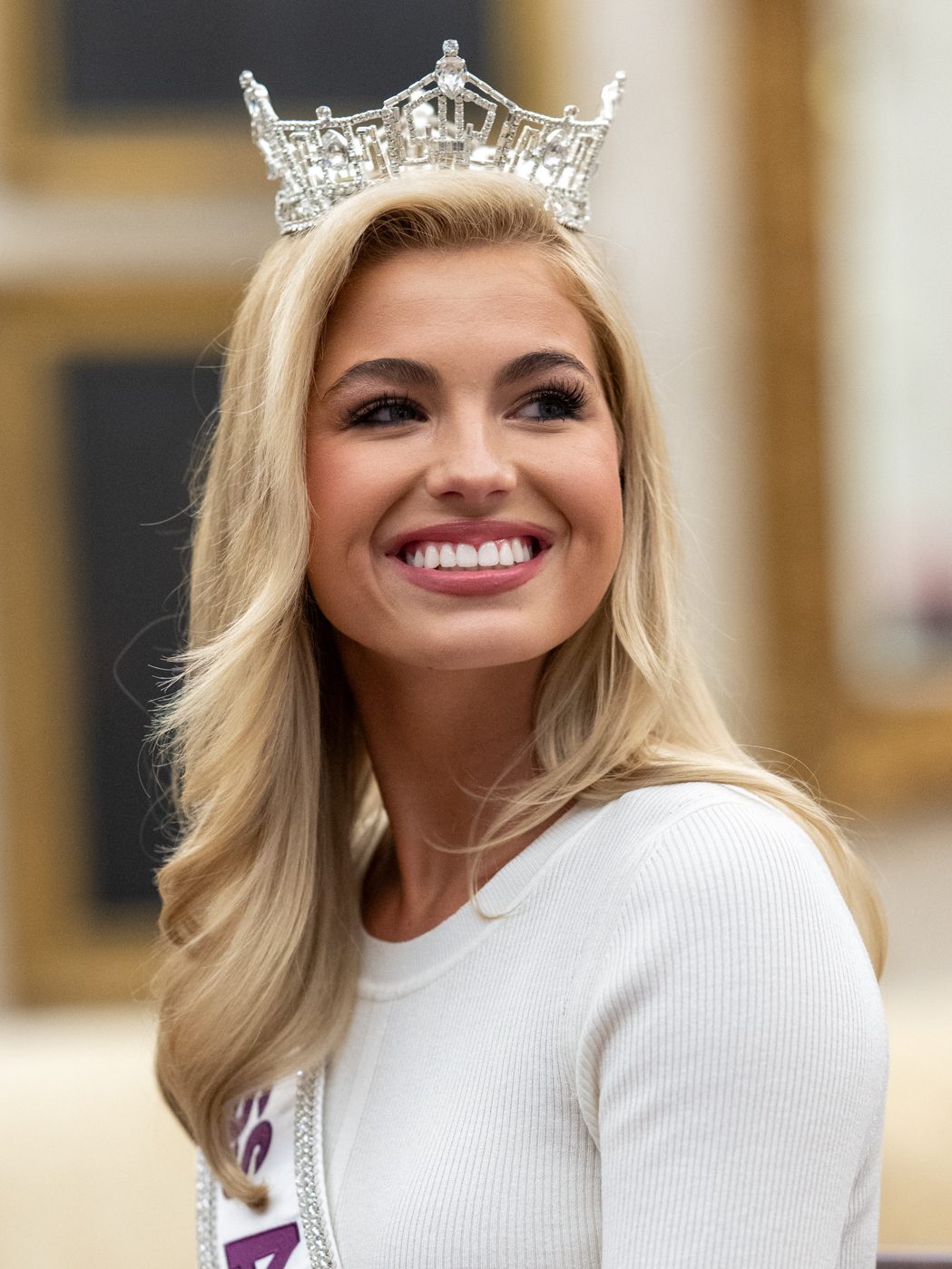
- Miss America 2025 Abbie Stockard
- Date: January 5, 2025
- Presenters: Nikki Novak; Terrence J
- Venue: Walt Disney Theater at Dr. Phillips Center for the Performing Arts, Orlando, Florida
- Broadcaster: Miss America Website (Note: On behalf of Pageant Vision streaming website)
- Entrants: 52
- Placements: 11
- Returns: Puerto Rico
- Winner: Abbie Stockard; Alabama
- Congeniality: Katie Ann Powell; District of Columbia

Miss America 2025 was the 97th edition of the Miss America pageant, held inside the Walt Disney Theater, located at the Dr. Phillips Center for the Performing Arts in Orlando, Florida, alongside the Miss America's Teen 2025 competition on January 4 and 5, 2025 respectively.

Madison Marsh of Colorado crowned Abbie Stockard of Alabama as her successor at the end of the event.

== Background ==
New eligibility rules allowed transgender entrants who have fully completed sex reassignment surgery a year prior to competing.

Ballroom dancing and cheerleading utilizing "human props" were added as potential talents. The partner must be dressed in all black and cannot perform any solo parts.

The Miss Puerto Rico pageant was reinstated after last competing in 2017.

== Results ==
=== Placements ===
Placement	Contestant
Miss America 2025	Abbie Stockard (Alabama)
1st Runner-Up	Annette Addo-Yobo (Texas)
2nd Runner-Up	Carley Jaymes Vogel (Tennessee)
3rd Runner-Up	Casana Fink (Florida)
4th Runner-Up	Stephanie Finoti (Ohio)
Top 11	Alexandra Lotko (Colorado); Ludwidg Louizaire (Georgia ); Emily Rae Schumacher (Minnesota); Lauren Frost (Oklahoma); Davis Wash (South Carolina); Mandi Jo Genord (Wisconsin)

== Contestants ==
- Declared as winner
- Ended as a runner-up
- Ended as a semi-finalist

Fifty-two contestants competed for the title.

State	Contestant	Age (Note: Ages at the time of national competition)	Hometown	Talent	Community Service Initiative	Notes
Alabama	Abbie Stockard	21	Vestavia	Contemporary Dance, "You Say"	Be the Change – Find A Cure: Cystic Fibrosis Awareness	
Alaska	Jordan Naylor	26	Anchorage	Ballroom Dance, "Little Party Never Killed Nobody (All We Got)"	"Nation of Lifesavers"	Previously Miss Alaska's Outstanding Teen 2012 Previously Miss Alaska USA 2023
Arizona	Shailey Ringenbach	20	Phoenix	Lyrical Dance, "If You're Reading This"	"Share the Love: Improving Mental Health through Pet Therapy"	Older sister of Miss Arizona's Outstanding Teen 2022, Saray Ringenbach
Arkansas	Camille Cathey	22	Wynne	Vocal, "If I Had My Way"	"Proudly Volunteer"	Previously Miss Arkansas' Outstanding Teen 2018
California	Kimberly Vernon	27	Santa Clara	Jazz Dance, "Le Jazz Hot"	"Arts for All - Advocating for Accessible Arts Education"	
Colorado	Alexandra Lotko	26	Denver	Vocal, "My Funny Valentine"	"It's Okay to not be Okay"	
Connecticut	Monica Fenwick	23	Watertown	Flute, "Don't Stop Me Now"	"Communication is Key"	
Delaware	Nova Rae Gaffney	24	Milford	Classical Ballet en Pointe, "Carmen"	"Behind Closed Doors: Domestic Violence Awareness"	
District of Columbia	Katie Ann Powell	26		Harp, "Baroque Flamenco"	"Preparing Women for Financial Success"	
Florida	Casana M. Fink	25	Ocala	Lyrical Dance, "Rescue"	"Give to Life; Donate Life - Advocating for Tissue and Organ Donation"	
Georgia	Ludwidg Louizaire	26	Rome	Broadway Vocal, "Home"	"Education for Every Student"	
Hawaii	Hayley Cheyney-Kāne	27	Kaneohe	Vocal and Hula, "Aloha Wau la'oe"	"Aloha is for Everyone"	Previously Miss Hawaii's Outstanding Teen 2013
Idaho	Madison Andreason	21	Idaho Falls	Vocal, "What Was I Made For"	"Get Up and Get Out"	Previously Miss Idaho's Outstanding Teen 2021 Daughter of Miss Idaho USA 1987, Vicki Hoffman Andreason
Illinois	Breana Bagley	26	Decatur	Lyrical Dance, "A New Day Has Come"		
Indiana	Kalyn Melham	23	Muncie	Vocal, "Don't Forget Me"	'ACT: Advocating for Change through Theater"	
Iowa	Abigaille Batu-Tiako	21	Oskaloosa	Vocal, "The Joke"	"The United Voices"	
Kansas	Alexis Smith	25	Wichita	Ventriloquism, "The Auctioneer"	"Respect Reclaimed"	
Kentucky	Chapel Tinius	24	Bowling Green	Fiddle Medley	"Operation Gratitude: For the Fallen, For the Fighting, For the Veterans"	Previously Miss Kentucky's Outstanding Teen 2016 Previously Distinguished Young Woman of Kentucky 2018
Louisiana	Olivia Grace George	20	Ruston	Jazz Dance, "Bossa Nova Baby"	"Education is KEY! Knowledge Empowers Youth"	
Maine	Jennie Daley	28	Sullivan	HERStory	"#DressLikeAnEngineer"	
Maryland	Bridget O'Brien	22	Frederick	Musical Theater Vocal, "Don't Rain On My Parade"	"Boomerang!"	
Massachusetts	Kiersten Khoury	23	Westwood	HERStory, "Fight Song"	"Redefining Dyslexia: Turning Challenges in Superpowers"	
Michigan	Jenae Lodewyk	24	Bay City	HERStory	"Women in the Workplace"	Older sister to Miss Michigan's Outstanding Teen 2016, Kendra Lodewyk
Minnesota	Emily Rae Schumacher	24	Mankato	Tap Dance, "Proud Mary" & "River Deep Mountain High"	"The Heart of the Matter"	Previously Miss Minnesota's Outstanding Teen 2017 Older sister of Miss Minnesota's Outstanding Teen 2022, Julia Schumacher
Mississippi	Becky Williams	22	Purvis	Jazz Dance, "Move You're Steppin' on My Heart"	"Make a Move"	Previously Distinguished Young Woman of Mississippi 2020
Missouri	Ashley Berry	20	Clinton	Contemporary Ballet en Pointe, "Eleanor Rigby"		Previously Miss Missouri's Outstanding Teen 2021
Montana	Kaylee Wolfensberger	20	Bozeman	Piano, "Great Balls of Fire"	"Healing Harmonies"	
Nebraska	Raechel Warren	28	Omaha	Roller Figure Skating, "Song Must Go On"	"Passion to Purpose"	Previously Miss Iowa Volunteer 2022
Nevada	Karrina Ferris	21	Carson City	Lyrical Dance, "You Will Be Found"	"Inform To Reform: Educating America's Future"	
New Hampshire	Emily Spencer	23	Bedford	Lyrical Dance, "One Moment in Time"	"Inspiring Inclusivity through Education and Opportunity"	
New Jersey	Elizabeth Mendel	22	Cape May Court House	Lyrical Dance, "It's All Coming Back to Me"	"Image is Everywhere"	
New Mexico	Emille-Marie Enriquez		Alamogordo	Folkloric Dance, "El Son De La Negra"		Previously Miss New Mexico Volunteer 2022
New York	Abigail Quammen	24	Manhattan	Vocal, "My Way"	"Read to Lead to Succeed"	Previously Miss Kentucky's Outstanding Teen 2017
North Carolina	Helen Carrie Everett	20	Durham	Vocal, "The Impossible Dream"	"We Need Equity to Build Communities"	
North Dakota	Sophia Richards	23	Hope	Vocal, "La Vie En Rose"	"BIO Girls"	
Ohio	Stephanie Finoti	21	Columbus	Ballet en Pointe, "Kitri Act III" and "Don Quixote"	"That STEM Girl"	
Oklahoma	Lauren Frost	24	Tahlequah	Clogging, "Hound Dog"	"Adoption as Oklahoma's Option"	
Oregon	Abigail Hoppe	25	McMinnville	Latin Ballroom Dance, 'Let's Get Loud"	"Making Type 1 Diabetes Feel Like Type None Diabetes"	
Pennsylvania	Page Weinstein	26	Pittsburgh	Dance Twirl, "Thunderstruck"		Previously Miss Pennsylvania's Outstanding Teen 2014
Puerto Rico	Wilma Victoria Richiez-Mateo		San Juan	HERStory		
Rhode Island	Ali Hornung	24	Providence	Vocal, "Legally Blonde"	"Glimmer of Hope"	
South Carolina	Davis Wash	23	Edgefield	Vocal, "Ain't No Sunshine"		
South Dakota	Joelle Simpson	20	Rapid City	Harp, "Swan Lake Harp Cadenza"	"Nurturing Nature"	
Tennessee	Carley Jaymes Vogel	24	Murfreesboro / Kennesaw, Georgia	Classical Vocal, "Climb Every Mountain"		She is the daughter of Miss Georgia-USA 1985, Amanda Smith Vogel
Texas	Annette Addo-Yobo	25	Southlake	Slam Poetry, "Autism SPEAKS"		
Utah	Paris Matthews	26	Cottonwood Heights	Jazz Dance, "All That Jazz"	"Power of Play: Advocating for Hospitalized Children"	
Vermont	Meara Seery	24	Brattleboro	Vocal, "Seven Nation Army"	"Green for Good"	
Virginia	Carlehr Swanson	25	Charlottesville	Vocal/Piano, "Get Here"		
Washington	Hermona Girmay	23	Seattle	Vocal, "My Days"		
West Virginia	Jennifer Reuther	26	Wheeling	Jazz Dance	"Wellness Across West Virginia"	
Wisconsin	Mandi Jo Genord	22	Beaver Dam	Contemporary Jazz Dance, "You Don't Own Me"	"Connecting Lives: Adoption Resources and Advocacy"	Previously Miss Wisconsin's Outstanding Teen 2018
Wyoming	Baylee Drewry	23	Greybull	HERStory, "Breath and Life"	"Supporting Girls and Women in Sports"	Previously Miss Wyoming Teen USA 2020
