= Miss America =

Annual competition in the United States

- Type: Beauty pageant
- Headquarters: Wellington, Florida
- Country represented: United States
- First edition: 1921
- Most recent edition: 2027
- Current titleholder: Regan Hutsell; Texas
- CEO: Robin Ross-Fleming
- Language: English
- Predecessor: The Fall Frolic (held in September 25, 1920; 106 years ago in Atlantic City, New Jersey)
- Website: missamerica.org

Miss America is an annual competition that is open to women from the United States between the ages of 18 and 28. Originating in 1921 as a "bathing beauty revue", the contest is judged on competition segments with scoring percentages: Private Interview (30%) – a 10-minute press conference-style interview with a panel of judges, On Stage Question (10%) – answering a judge's question onstage, Talent or HER Story (20%) – a performance talent or 90-second speech, Health and Fitness (20%) – demonstrated physical fitness onstage dressed in athletic wear, and Evening Gown (20%) – modeling evening-wear onstage.

Miss America 2027 is Regan Hutsell of Texas, who was crowned on September 6, 2026, at the Palm Beach County Convention Center in West Palm Beach, Florida.

== Overview ==
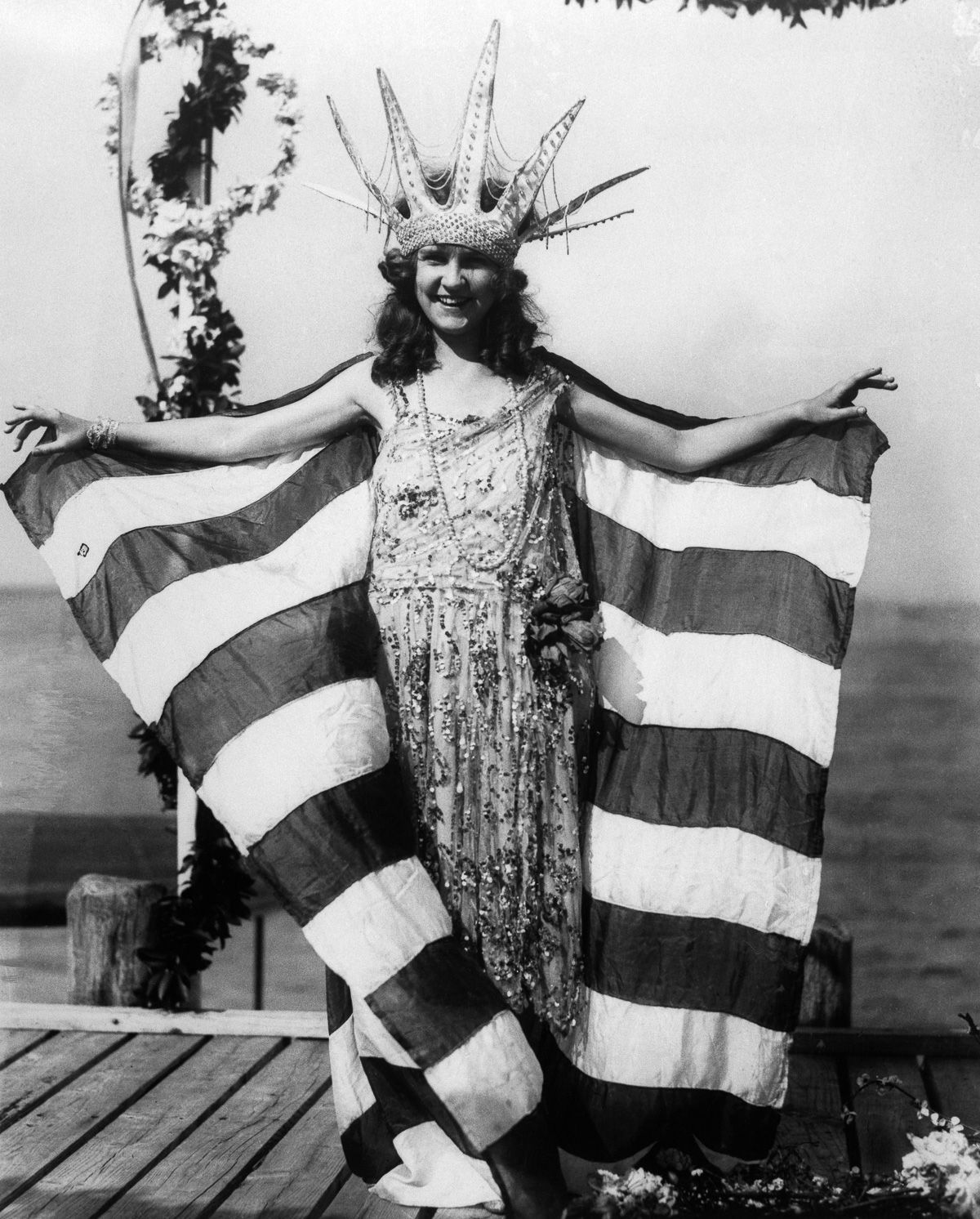
Margaret Gorman, Miss America 1921

On February 1, 1919, a beauty pageant was held at the Chu Chin Chow Ball at the Hotel des Artistes in New York City. The winner, Edith Hyde Robbins Macartney, was called "Miss America." Neither the title nor this pageant was related to the current "Miss America Pageant" which would develop a year later in Atlantic City, New Jersey. Rather, the origins of the "Miss America Pageant" lie in an event entitled The Fall Frolic held on September 25, 1920, in Atlantic City. This event was designed to bring business to the Boardwalk: "three hundred and fifty gaily decorated rolling wicker chairs were pushed along the parade route. Three hundred and fifty men pushed the chairs. However, the main attractions were the young 'maidens' who sat in the rolling chairs, headed by Head Maiden Miss Ernestine Cremona, who was dressed in a flowing white robe and represented 'Peace.'"

The event was so successful that The Businessmen's League planned to repeat it the following year as a beauty pageant or a "bather's revue" (to capitalize on the popularity of newspaper-based beauty contests that used photo submissions). The event was scheduled to take place the weekend following Labor Day, to encourage summer visitors to stay in Atlantic City. Thus, "newspapers from Pittsburgh to Washington, D.C., were asked to sponsor local beauty contests. The winners would participate in the Atlantic City contest. If the local newspaper would pay for the winner's wardrobe, the Atlantic City Businessmen's League would pay for the contestant's travel to compete in the Inter-City Beauty Contest." Herb Test, a "newspaperman", coined the term for the winner: "Miss America." On September 8, 1921, 100,000 people gathered at the Boardwalk to watch the contestants from Washington, D.C., Baltimore, Pittsburgh, Harrisburg, Ocean City, Camden, Newark, New York City, and Philadelphia. Out of the nine contestants, the two frontrunners were Virginia Lee and Margaret Gorman. A conflict ensued when the judges disqualified 22-year-old Lee at the last minute because she was deemed a professional rather than an amateur like the other contestants because she was 1) a working actress, 2) married, and 3) a friend of the competition's chief judge. The 16-year-old winner from Washington, D.C., Margaret Gorman, was crowned the "Golden Mermaid" and won $100.

The pageant continued consistently over the next eight decades except for the years 1928–1932, when it was temporarily shut down due to financial problems associated with the Great Depression and suggestions that it promoted "loose morals." With its revival in 1933, 15-year-old Marian Bergeron won, prompting future contestants to be between the ages of 18 and 26. In 1935, Lenora Slaughter was hired to "re-invent" the pageant and served for 32 years as its director. By 1938, a talent section was added to the competition, and contestants were required to have a chaperone. In 1940, the title officially became "The Miss America Pageant" and the pageant was held in Atlantic City's Convention Hall. In 1944, compensation for "Miss America" switched from "furs and movie contracts" to college scholarships, an idea generally credited to Jean Bartel, Miss America 1943.

During the early years of the pageant, under the directorship of Lenora Slaughter, it became racially segregated via rule number seven that stated: "contestants must be of good health and of the white race." Rule seven was abolished in 1950. Miss New York 1945, Bess Myerson, the only Jewish American winner to date, became Miss America 1945 and faced antisemitism during her time as Miss America, leading to a cutback in her official duties. Although there were Native American, Latina, and Asian-American contestants, there were no African-American contestants for fifty years (African-Americans appeared in musical numbers as far back as 1923, however, when they were cast as slaves).

In 1970, Cheryl Browne, Miss Iowa 1970, competed as the first African-American contestant in the Miss America 1971 pageant. She also participated in one of the last USO-Miss America tours in Vietnam. A decade later in 1983, Miss New York (and Miss Syracuse) 1983, Vanessa Williams (the first African-American woman to win the competition as Miss America 1984), resigned under pressure due to a scandal involving nude photographs. Three decades after these events, Miss New York (and Miss Syracuse) 2013, Nina Davuluri, the first Indian-American woman to win the crown as Miss America 2014, faced xenophobic and racist comments on social media when she won. Two years later, at the Miss America 2016 pageant, then Miss America CEO Sam Haskell apologized to Vanessa Williams (who was serving as head judge) for what was said to her during the events of 1984.

In 2018, the pageant adopted a new format, referred to as "Miss America 2.0", as part of an effort under new chairwoman Gretchen Carlson to "[evolve Miss America] in this cultural revolution." Under the new format, competitors were no longer judged on their physical appearance (resulting in the highly publicized announcement that the event would no longer include a swimsuit competition). In 2023, many of the "Miss America 2.0" changes (including the ban on judging personal appearance) were reversed under the advent of new leadership.

== History ==
=== 1921–1967 ===
Margaret Gorman, Miss District of Columbia, was declared "The Most Beautiful Bathing Girl in America" in 1921 at the age of 16 and was recognized as the first "Miss America" when she returned to compete the next year. The contest that year was won by Mary Katherine Campbell (Miss Ohio), who won again in 1923. She returned to compete a third time in 1924 but placed as first runner-up that year, and pageant rules were then amended to prevent anyone from winning more than once. Alta Sterling, competing as Miss Sioux City, was the first to represent the state of Iowa at the 1924 Miss America pageant. Sterling had the distinction of being the first Jewish contestant to compete for Miss America – one of some very notable "firsts" by Miss Iowa contestants.

Beginning in 1940, Bob Russell served as the first official host of the pageant. In 1941, Mifaunwy Shunatona, Miss Oklahoma, became the first Native American contestant.

In 1945, Bess Myerson became the first Jewish-American and the first Miss New York (competing as Miss New York City, a competition organized by a local radio station) to win the Miss America pageant as Miss America 1945. As the only Jewish contestant, Myerson was encouraged by the pageant directors to change her name to "Bess Meredith" or "Beth Merrick", but she refused. After winning the title (and as a Jewish Miss America), Myerson received few endorsements and later recalled that "I couldn't even stay in certain hotels […] there would be signs that read no coloreds, no Jews, no dogs. I felt so rejected. Here I was chosen to represent American womanhood and then America treated me like this." She thus cut short her Miss America tour and instead traveled with the Anti-Defamation League. In this capacity, she spoke against discrimination in a talk entitled, "You Can't Be Beautiful and Hate."

In 1948, Irma Nydia Vasquez, the first Miss Puerto Rico, became the first Latina contestant. In addition, in 1948, Yun Tau Chee, the first Miss Hawaii, was also the first Asian-American contestant. Miss America 1949, Jacque Mercer, was married and divorced during her reign; after this, a rule was enacted requiring Miss America contestants to sign a certification that they have never been married or pregnant.

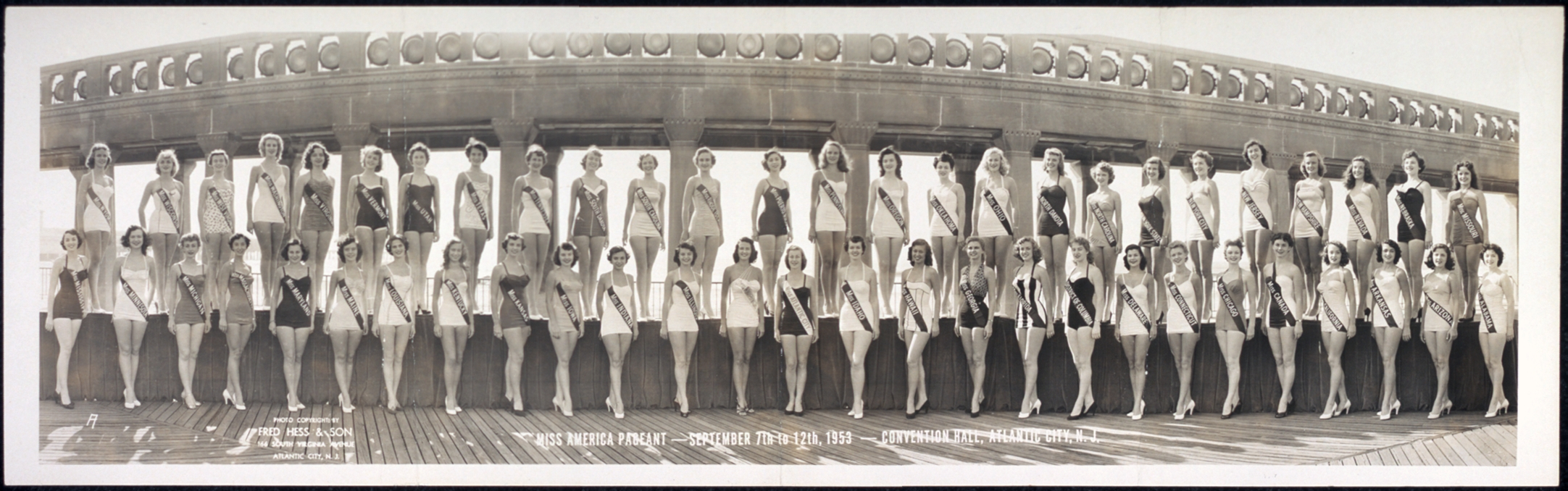
Miss America 1953 swimsuit competition

Starting in 1950, although the pageant continued to be in September, the organization that hosted the pageant changed the Miss America title to "post-dated"; thus, that year's pageant winner, Yolande Betbeze, became Miss America 1951, and there was no Miss America 1950. The pageant was first televised nationally in 1954, hosted by Bob Russell. Future television star Lee Meriwether was crowned Miss America 1955. It would also be the last time Russell served as host. He recommended, and was replaced by, Bert Parks, who served as the host for the second televised pageant in 1955 and stayed as host until 1979. Television viewership peaked during the early 1960s, when it was the highest-rated program on American television.

The 1965 pageant was the second major event in less than a month to take place at Boardwalk Hall; less than two weeks before, it played host to the Democratic National Convention.

=== 1968–2016 ===
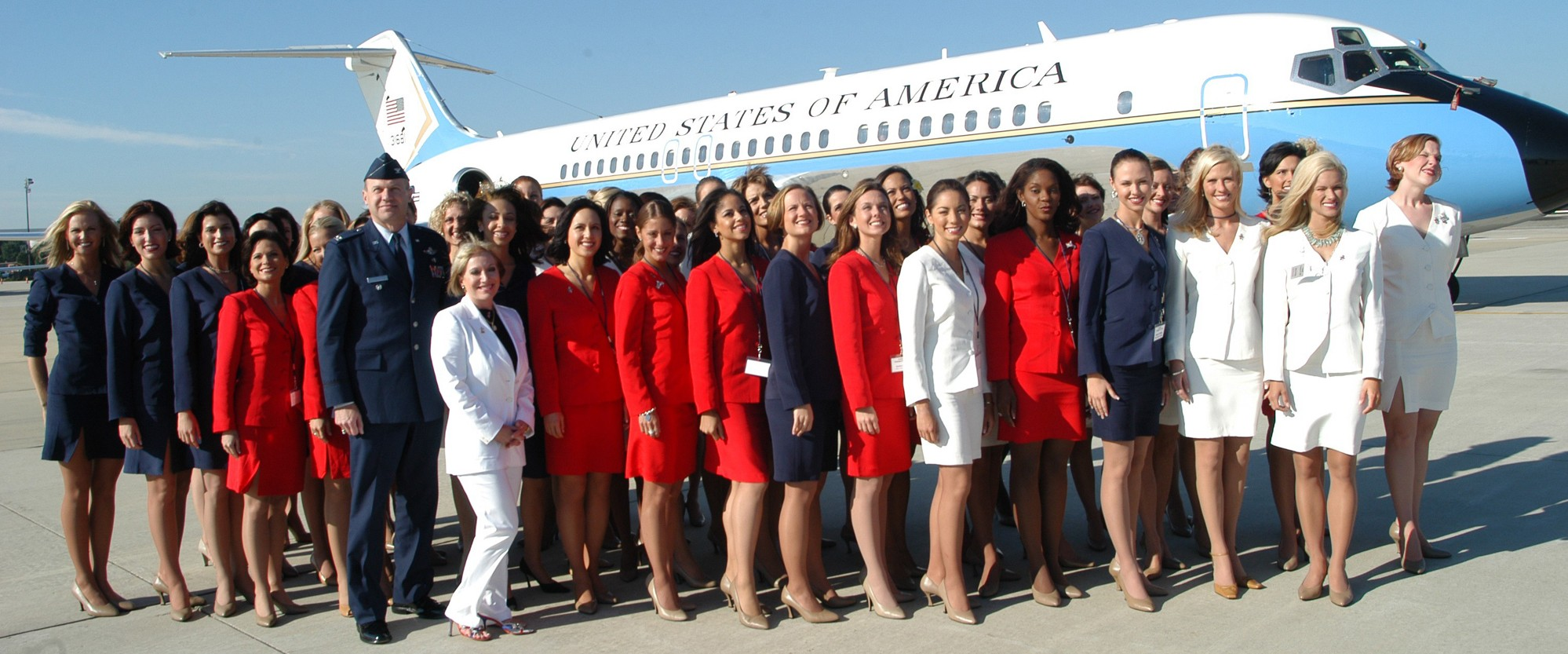
Miss America 2003 contestants

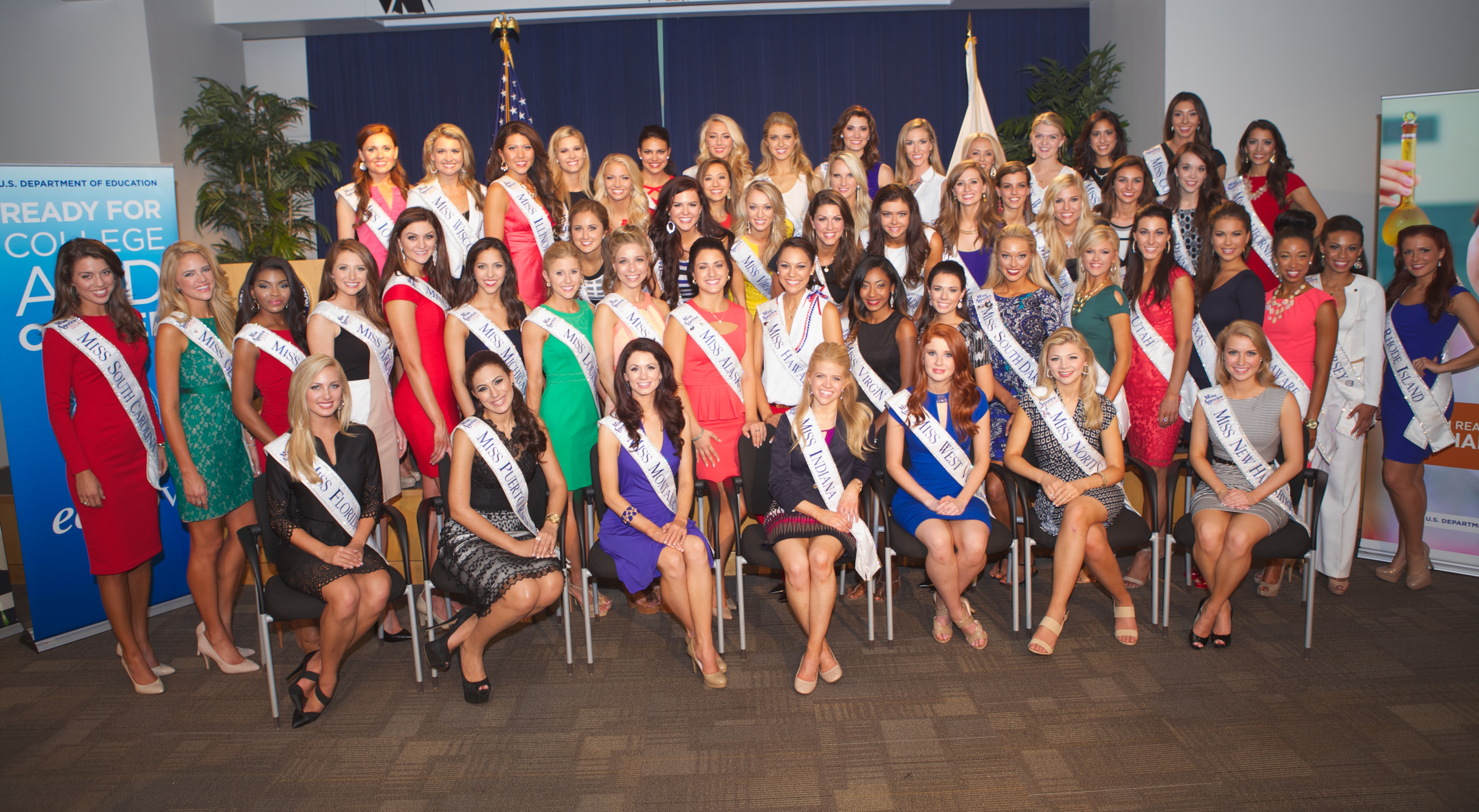
Miss America 2015 contestants

With the rise of second-wave feminism and the civil rights movement during the 1960s, the Miss America pageant became the subject of a series of protests that attacked it as sexist, racist, and part of U.S. militarism. The first such demonstration took place during the Miss America 1969 pageant held on September 7, 1968 (won by Miss Illinois 1968, Judith Ford), when about 200 members of the group New York Radical Women demonstrated as part of the Miss America protest. Bev Grant's photographs of this event have become iconic. In addition, a pamphlet distributed at the protest by Robin Morgan, No More Miss America!, became a source for feminist scholarship. The protest was co-sponsored by Florynce Kennedy's Media Workshop, an activist group she founded in 1966 to protest the media's representation of blacks, along with the feminist Jeannette Rankin Brigade and the ACLU. Morgan later stated that the Miss America pageant "was chosen as a target for a number of reasons: it has always been a lily-white, racist contest; the winner tours Vietnam, entertaining the troops as a 'Murder Mascot'; the whole gimmick is one commercial shillgame to sell the sponsor's products. Where else could one find such a perfect combination of American values—racism, militarism, sexism—all packaged in one ‘ideal symbol,’ a woman." The protesters compared the pageant to a county fair where livestock are judged. They thus crowned a sheep as Miss America and symbolically destroyed a number of feminine products, including false eyelashes, high-heeled shoes, curlers, hairspray, makeup, girdles, corsets, and bras. Burning the contents of a trash can was suggested, but a permit was unobtainable; news media seized on the similarity between draft resisters burning draft cards and women burning their bras. In fact, there was no bra burning, nor did anyone remove her bra. The Women's Liberation Front later demonstrated at the Miss America 1971 pageant.

Miss Iowa 1970, Cheryl Browne, became the first black contestant in the competition's history during the Miss America 1971 pageant (September 12, 1970). She drew attention from reporters and from security personnel in Atlantic City who maintained a visible presence during pageant rehearsals. Browne was not a finalist, however, losing to future media personality, Miss Texas 1970, Phyllis George. In August 1971, Browne traveled to Vietnam with George; Miss Nevada 1970, Vicky Jo Todd; Miss New Jersey 1970, Hela Yungst; Miss Arizona 1970, Karen Shields; Miss Arkansas 1970, Donna Connelly; and Miss Texas 1970 (George's replacement), Belinda Myrick. They participated in a 22-day United Service Organizations tour for American troops that began in Saigon. Browne later commented that she thought "it was one of the last Miss America groups to go to Vietnam." Miss Arkansas 1980, Lencola Sullivan, finished the Miss America 1981 pageant (September 6, 1980) as fourth runner-up, making her the first black contestant to place in the top five.

A few years later, Vanessa Williams (Miss New York 1983) won the title of Miss America 1984 on September 17, 1983, making her the first black woman to wear the crown. Williams later commented that she was one of five minority contestants that year, noting that ballet dancer Deneen Graham "had already had a cross burned on her front yard because she was the first black Miss North Carolina [1983]." She also pointed out that "Suzette Charles was the first runner-up, and she was biracial. But when the press started, when I would go out on the – on the tour and do my appearances, and people would come up and say they never thought they'd see the day that it would happen; when people would want to shake my hand, and you'd see tears in their eyes, and they'd say, I never thought I'd see it in my lifetime – that's when, you know, it was definitely a very special honor." Williams' reign as Miss America was not without its challenges and controversies, however. For the first time in pageant history, a reigning Miss America was the target of death threats and hate mail. Williams was forced to resign seven weeks prior to the end of her time as Miss America, however, after the unauthorized publication of nude photos in Penthouse. First runner-up, Miss New Jersey 1983, Suzette Charles replaced her for the final weeks of Williams' reign. Thirty-two years after she resigned however, Vanessa Williams returned to the Miss America stage on September 13, 2015, for the Miss America 2016 pageant as head judge (where Miss Georgia 2015, Betty Cantrell, won the crown). The pageant began with former Miss America CEO Sam Haskell issuing an apology to Williams, telling her that although "none of us currently in the organization were involved then, on behalf of today's organization, I want to apologize to you and to your mother, Miss Helen Williams. I want to apologize for anything that was said or done that made you feel any less the Miss America you are and the Miss America you always will be." Suzette Charles (Williams' replacement) said in an interview with Inside Edition that she was perplexed over the apology and suggested that it was given for the purpose of ratings.

In 1985, Miss Utah 1984, Sharlene Wells Hawkes, became the first foreign-born, bilingual Miss America, as she was born in Asunción, Paraguay. Miss Alabama 1994, Heather Whitestone, won the 1995 pageant becoming the first deaf Miss America (she lost most of her hearing at the age of 18 months). At the Miss America 1999 pageant held on September 19, 1998, Nicole Johnson (Miss Virginia 1998) became the first Miss America with diabetes and the first contestant to publicize an insulin pump. Around the same time, Miss America officials announced they had lifted the ban on contestants who were divorced or had had an abortion. This rule change, however, was rescinded and Miss America CEO Robert L. Beck, who had suggested it, was fired. Angela Perez Baraquio, Miss Hawaii 2000, was crowned Miss America 2001, thereby becoming the first Asian-American, the first Filipino-American, as well as the first teacher ever to win the pageant.

A few years later, the Miss America 2005 pageant held on September 18, 2004, would be the last one televised live on ABC (which dropped the pageant after this broadcast, as it "drew a record-low 9.8 million viewers") and the last one held in Atlantic City for ten years. Miss Alabama 2004, Deidre Downs, reigned as Miss America four months longer than usual as the Miss America 2006 pageant was moved to a January broadcast at the Las Vegas Strip's Theatre for the Performing Arts (Planet Hollywood Resort & Casino). It was broadcast live on Country Music Television. After two years, the pageant moved to the TLC network. The Miss America 2011 pageant held on January 15, 2011, showcased Miss New York 2010, Claire Buffie, (the first Miss America contestant to advocate a gay-rights platform) and Miss Delaware 2010, Kayla Martell, (the first bald contestant). ABC also resumed broadcasting the pageant with the 2011 competition. The Miss America 2013 pageant, held on January 12, 2013, was the last one to take place in Las Vegas. Miss New York 2012, Mallory Hagan, won the competition but only served for eight months as the pageant moved back to its former broadcast slot in September 2013 Miss Montana 2012, Alexis Wineman, ("America's Choice" winner) was the pageant's first autistic contestant.

With the Miss America 2014 pageant, held on September 15, 2013, the competition returned to Boardwalk Hall, Atlantic City, New Jersey. Miss New York (Nina Davuluri) won the title of Miss America. Davuluri was also the first Indian-American and second Asian-American to win the crown. Shortly after her win, however, Davuluri became the target of xenophobic and racist comments on social media relating the proximity of the event date to the 9/11 anniversary and to anti-Indian sentiment. News agencies cited tweets that misidentified her as Muslim or Arab, associated her with groups such as Al-Qaeda, and questioned why she was chosen over Miss Kansas 2013, Theresa Vail (a soldier who won the "America's Choice" award and was the first contestant to display tattoos during the swimsuit competition). Davuluri said that she was prepared for this backlash because "as Miss New York, I was called a terrorist and very similar remarks", and Vail denounced the social media backlash, offering her support to Davuluri. Torn ligaments forced Miss Florida 2013, Myrrhanda Jones, to perform her baton routine with a decorated leg brace, while Nicole Kelly (Miss Iowa 2013) was the first contestant without a forearm to compete in the pageant.

Amanda Longacre, then Miss Delaware 2014, who was preparing to compete in Miss America 2015, was stripped of the title and the crown because she was deemed to be too old. Longacre filed a $3 million lawsuit, and Miss America officials later blamed the error on state pageant officials who they said "missed the age discrepancy in Longacre's submitted paperwork." Miss New York 2014 (Kira Kazantsev) eventually won the title of Miss America 2015, making New York the first state to produce a winner for three consecutive years.

In September 2014, comedian John Oliver ran a segment on his show, Last Week Tonight, that investigated the Miss America Organization's claim that it is "the world's largest provider of scholarships for women." Oliver's team, which included four researchers with journalism backgrounds, collected and analyzed the organization's state and federal tax forms to find that the organization's scholarship program only distributes a small fraction of its claimed "$45 million made available annually". Oliver said that at the national level, the Miss America Organization and Miss America Foundation together spent only $482,000 in cash scholarships in 2012. Oliver found that at the state level, the Miss Alabama pageant claimed that it had provided $2,592,000 in scholarships to Troy University despite not actually distributing any such scholarships. The pageant appeared to multiply the value of a single available scholarship by the number of contestants theoretically eligible for it, while using the term "provided" in a way that did not mean "distributed." The Miss America Organization responded by stating that Oliver affirmed that it provides the most scholarships to women and that the $45 million figure was based on all scholarships made available whether or not they are accepted.

In February 2015, Sharon Pearce announced that she was stepping down from her role as President of the Miss America Organization. At that time, former CEO Sam Haskell was named Executive Chairman of the Miss America Organization, retained the title of CEO, and assumed all of Pearce's responsibilities. In addition, Miss America 2014, Nina Davuluri, was appointed one of the new trustees to the Miss America Foundation. In September 2015, Miss America officials announced that the organization granted $5.5 million in scholarships, a number that included all offers of in-kind tuition waivers from multiple schools when a contestant could accept one at most. In 2019, a lawyer for the Miss America Foundation put the number at $1.3-1.4 million and said that 85% of the money is raised by contestants themselves, through solicitations from friends, family, and businesses.

On March 24, 2016, the Miss America Organization announced a contract renewal with ABC to continue carrying the pageant for the next three years to the 2019 edition.

In June 2016, Erin O'Flaherty was crowned Miss Missouri, becoming the first openly lesbian Miss America contestant.

=== 2017–2024 (Miss America 2.0 Era) ===
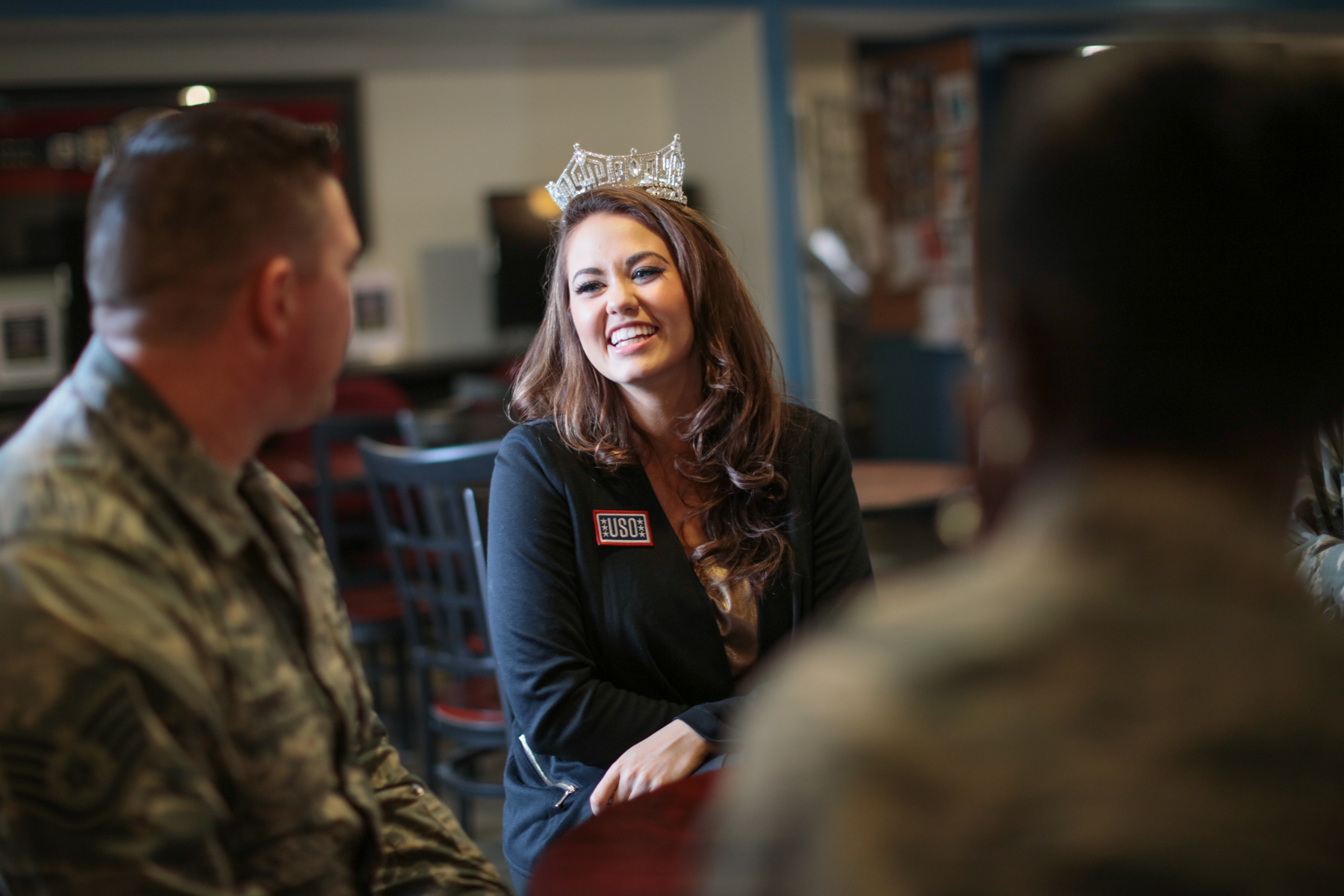
Miss America 2018, Cara Mund, visits the Fort Meade USO.

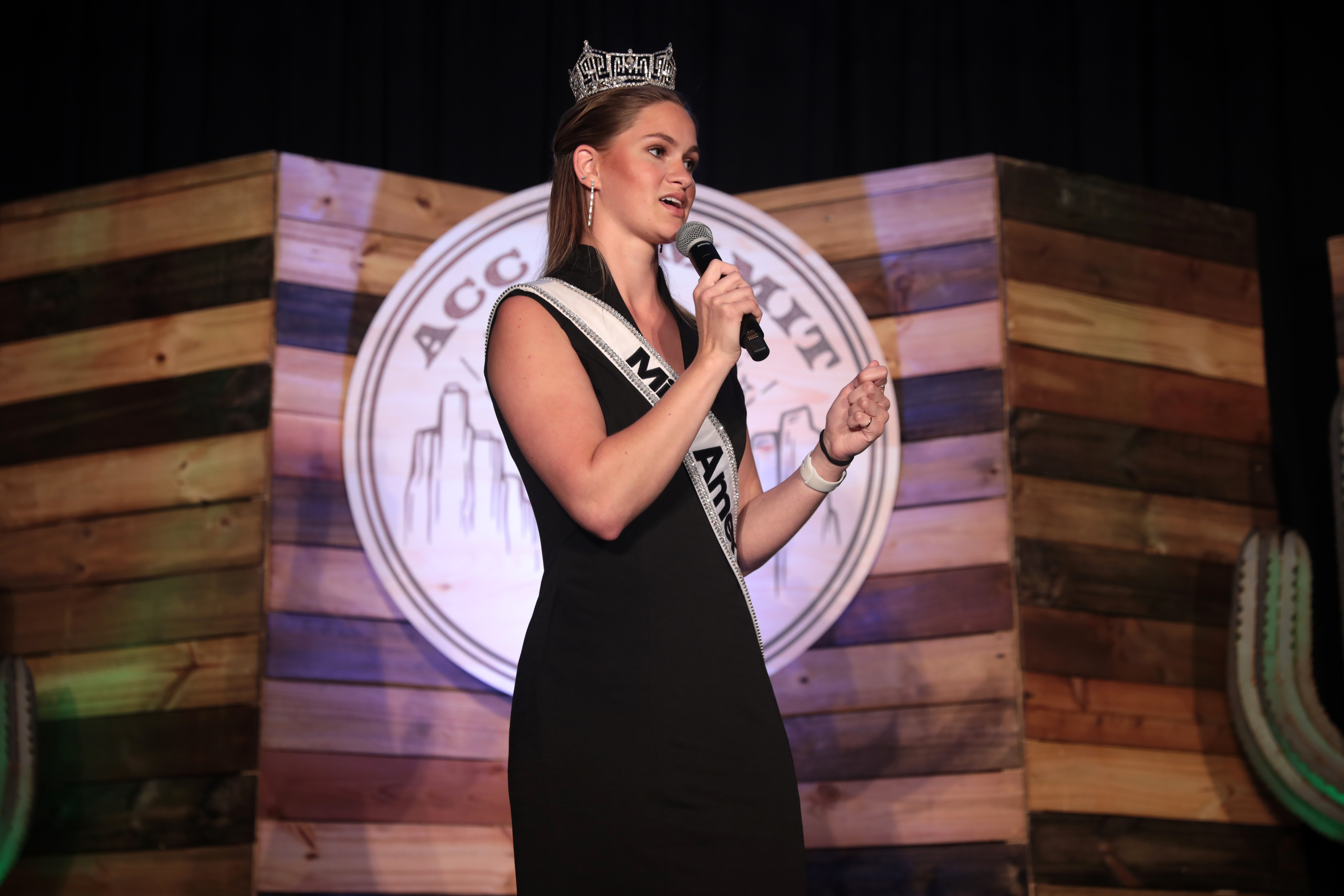
Miss America 2023, Grace Stanke (the last Miss America winner of the 2.0 era)

In late December 2017, HuffPost published an article exposing derogatory emails sent and received by CEO Sam Haskell, board members Tammy Haddad and Lynn Weidner, and lead writer Lewis Friedman. The emails, sent between 2014 and 2017, featured instances of expletive name-calling and unprofessional comments. The comments were often sexual or violent in nature and targeted former Miss America winners, notably Mallory Hagan and Katherine Shindle, both of whom joined 47 other former Miss Americas (including all Miss Americas from 1988 to 2017) in signing a joint open letter calling for the firing or resignation of all involved. On December 22, the Miss America Organization (MAO) released statements to USA Today, saying that it was made aware of concerns several months prior. They stated that the organization does not "condone the use of inappropriate language" and reported that its investigation had determined that Haskell was under "unreasonable distress resulting from intense attacks on his family from disgruntled stakeholders". The organization also reported that its relationship with Friedman had been terminated. Haskell explained that attacks on his character impaired his judgment when responding to the emails. Miss America's board of directors also suspended Haskell, who released a statement labeling the HuffPost article "unkind and untrue". Hagan and Shindle criticized the decision to suspend Haskell, rather than fire him, as inadequate. The following day, the President of Miss America, Josh Randle; executive chairwoman Lynn Weidner; and Haskell all resigned. The scandal prompted the pageant's producer, Dick Clark Productions, to cut ties, and the Casino Reinvestment Development Authority (CRDA) announced that it was reconsidering its contract with Miss America, with its executive director Chris Howard describing the scandal as "troubling", and both Frank Gilliam, incoming mayor of Atlantic City, and State Senator Colin Bell called for CRDA to end its relationship with Miss America. On December 24, Haddad also resigned.

In January 2018, Gretchen Carlson, who won the Miss America pageant in 1989, was elected as the new chairwoman of the organization, becoming the first former Miss America to serve as its leader. Katherine Shindle, Miss America 1998, was also appointed to the board alongside fellow Miss America winners, Heather French Henry (2000) and Laura Kaeppeler (2012). This move led to a number of changes. In June 2018, there was an announcement that Miss America contestants would no longer be judged based on their physical appearance. Thus, the national Miss America event would be considered a competition, rather than a beauty pageant, and the titleholders would now be candidates, rather than contestants. The swimsuit competition was replaced with state titleholders participating in a live interactive session with the judges. The evening gown competition was dropped; the contestants chose clothing "that makes them feel confident, expresses their personal style, and shows how they hope to advance the role of Miss America." In interviews, Carlson emphasized the organization's desire to be more welcoming, "open, transparent, [and] inclusive to women," and to prioritize displaying the talent and scholarship in the contestants. The new board of directors increased the maximum age of titleholders to 25 years old, from 24. Therefore, contestants could not be older than 25 years old on December 31 in the calendar year of their state competition. These new organizational changes under Carlson were referred to as the "Miss America 2.0" format.

In August 2018, Miss America 2018 Cara Mund gave an interview to The Press of Atlantic City in which she stated that it had "been a tough year." She then wrote an open letter to former Miss Americas a few weeks later, in order to explain her comments. In the letter she states that the current leadership had "silenced me, reduced me, marginalized me, and essentially erased me in my role as Miss America." She also stated that her "voice is not heard nor wanted by our current leadership …nor do they have any interest in knowing who I am and how my experiences relate to positioning the organization for the future." Carlson denied Mund's claims. However, at the time the Miss America 2019 competition began, 46 of 51 state organizations (as well as 23 former Miss America winners) had signed a petition calling for the resignation of Carlson and CEO, Regina Hopper, from the Miss America Organization. The states who had not signed were Arkansas, Kentucky, Minnesota, Nevada, and Vermont.

On September 5, 2018, Fox Rothschild LLP, a law firm based in Philadelphia, Pennsylvania, filed a breach-of-contract suit against the MAO for failing to pay nearly $100,000 for legal services. Court fillings from October 26, 2018, ordered MAO to pay Fox Rothschild LLP $98,206.90 with interest for their unpaid legal bills. The Miss America Organization reported in December 2018 that a settlement had been made with Fox Rothschild LLP. From 2011 to 2016 (with the exception of 2014), MAO's tax fillings reveal that the organization was operating with a negative net income.

In the fall of 2018, MAO terminated licenses from Florida, Georgia, New Jersey, New York, Pennsylvania, Tennessee, and West Virginia. The leadership of the Miss Colorado organization quit in protest. With license termination the state organization cannot "claim to be affiliated with the Miss America Organization and must...turn over bank accounts with scholarship money to the national organization." On December 22, 2018; MAO awarded the license for the Miss Georgia organization to Trina Pruitt. On December 26, 2018; MAO also reinstated the license for the Miss New Jersey organization for one year, contingent on leadership changes and recruitment of new sponsors and board members.

In December 2018, state organizations from Georgia, Pennsylvania, Tennessee, and West Virginia, along with Jennifer Vaden Barth (former titleholder and former MAO board member), filed a lawsuit requesting the actions of Carlson and Hopper be voided, citing an "illegal and bad-faith takeover of the MAO, beginning in January 2018." The court date for this suit was set for January 25, 2019.

On June 5, 2019, Miss South Dakota 1997 and former South Dakota Secretary of State, Shantel Krebs, was unanimously elected to chairwoman of the Miss America Organization Board of Directors, succeeding Carlson. Krebs had been a member of the organization's board since October 2018. Carlson will "remain involved as an advisor to the Miss America Organization Board."

In Summer 2019, Miss America announced the contest would move out of Atlantic City. The December 19, 2019, event took place at Mohegan Sun in Uncasville, Connecticut. The broadcast moved from ABC to NBC, and was live streamed for the first time.

On May 8, 2020, the organization announced its next competition, originally slated for December 2020, was postponed due to the COVID-19 pandemic. The postponement will also include revised eligibility to be coordinated with state qualifying organizations to allow competitors who would usually age out to remain in consideration and ultimately there was no Miss America 2021 pageant and Miss America 2022 was held on December 17, 2021.

In November 2022, Brían Nguyen was crowned Miss Greater Derry in New Hampshire, becoming the first transgender titleholder under the Miss America organization.

Beginning in January 2023, major changes were made to the competition format following the "advent of...new Miss America Opportunity" of Robin Fleming as new Owner/CEO of the Miss America organization. Fleming is an entrepreneur, dress designer, and television producer and she formerly spent over 9 years directing state level Miss USA pageants. The new administration under Fleming has reversed some of the Miss America 2.0 changes including terminology (as of 2023, a competition participant will once again be referred to as a 'contestant' rather than the Miss America 2.0 term 'candidate') and the decision to not judge contestants based on their physical appearance (which occurred with the elimination of the swimsuit competition in 2018). Instead of a swimsuit competition, contestants will now be judged on physical fitness while modeling activewear. In addition, the performance talent competition, which has been part of the Miss America competition since 1938, has added a new category; contestants may now choose to present a “personal narrative in storytelling” as their talent in a category named "HER Story". The contestant age limit was also raised from 18–25 to 18–28.

On July 10, 2023, A&E premiered a four-part documentary series, "Secrets of Miss America", which interviewed past winners, contestants and staff members about historical issues with the Miss America organization related to body-shaming, racism and "psychological warfare" against contestants and winners.

In November 2024, Miss America's operator filed for Chapter 11 bankruptcy protection. In December 2024, Miss America Competition LLC asked to dismiss its bankruptcy.

In April 2026, the Miss America organization banned transgender women from competing following a legal threat from Florida Attorney General James Uthmeier.

== Winners ==
Miss America 2027, Regan Hutsell

=== Recent titleholders ===
Edition	Name	State
2027	Regan Hutsell	Texas
2026	Cassie Donegan	New York
2025	Abbie Stockard	Alabama
2024	Madison Marsh	Colorado
2023	Grace Stanke	Wisconsin

== Hosts ==
=== Present ===
- Billy Gilman and Jen Hale: 2027

=== Past ===
- Billy Gilman and Nikki Novak: 2026
- Terrence J and Nikki Novak: 2024–2025
- Laura Rutledge: 2023
- Nina Davuluri: 2022
- Ericka Dunlap: 2022
- Kit Hoover: 2020
- Mario Lopez: 2007, 2009–2010, 2020
- Ross Mathews and Carrie Ann Inaba: 2019
- Chris Harrison: 2004–2005, 2011–2018
- Sage Steele: 2017–2018
- Brooke Burke: 2011–2013, 2016
- Lara Spencer: 2014–2015
- Mark Steines: 2008
- James Denton: 2006
- Tom Bergeron: 2003
- Wayne Brady: 2002
- Tony Danza: 2001
- Donny and Marie Osmond: 1999–2000 (known collectively as "Donny & Marie")
- Boomer Esiason and Meredith Vieira: 1998
- Eva LaRue and John Callahan: 1997
- Regis Philbin: 1996
- Regis Philbin and Kathie Lee Gifford: 1991–1995 (known collectively as "Regis and Kathie Lee")
- Phyllis George: 1989–1990
- Gary Collins: 1982–1990
- Ron Ely: 1980–1981
- Bert Parks: 1955–1979
- Bob Russell: 1940–1954

== See also ==
- Miss America award winners
- Miss America's Teen

== Further reading and viewing ==
=== Archives and collections ===
- Finding Aid to Beauty Pageant Collection at Browne Popular Culture Library, University Libraries, Bowling Green State University, Bowling Green, Ohio.
- What Beauty Pageant Queens Looked Like the Year You Were Born. Cosmopolitan, May 31, 2016.
- It Happened Here in New Jersey: Miss America – Photographs of various Miss America pageants.
- It Happened Here in New Jersey- Here She is: Miss America and the Protest of 1968

=== Books ===
- Argetsinger, Amy. There She Was: The Secret History of Miss America. New York: One Signal Publishers/Atria Publishing Group, 2021.
- Banet-Weiser, Sarah. The Most Beautiful Girl in the World:Beauty Pageants and National Identity. Berkeley: University of California Press, 1999.
- Bivans, Ann-Marie. Miss America: In Pursuit of the Crown: the Complete Guide to the Miss America Pageant. New York: MasterMedia Limited, 1991.
- Carlson, Gretchen (Miss America 1989). Getting Real. New York: Viking Press, 2015.
- Mifflin, Margot. Looking for Miss America: A Pageant's 100-Year Quest to Define Womanhood. Berkeley: Counterpoint Press, 2020.
- Riverol, A.R. Live from Atlantic City: A History of the Miss America Pageant. Bowling Green, OH: Bowling Green State University Popular Press, 1992.
- Shindle, Kate (Miss America 1998). Being Miss America: Behind the Rhinestone Curtain. University of Texas Press, 2014.
- Williams, Vanessa (Miss America 1984) and Helen Williams. You Have No Idea: A Famous Daughter, Her No-nonsense Mother, and How They Survived Pageants, Hollywood, Love, Loss (and Each Other). New York: Gotham/Penguin Group, 2012.

=== Documentaries ===
- The American Experience: Miss America – American Experience, PBS (2001, 90 min)
- Secrets of Miss America - A&E (2023, 4 episodes)
- American Royalty Docuseries: The Miss America Pageant Its Legacy and Its Future - Fisher Films & Vision Films (2023, 5 episodes)
