= Miss America 2026 =

98th edition of the Miss America competition

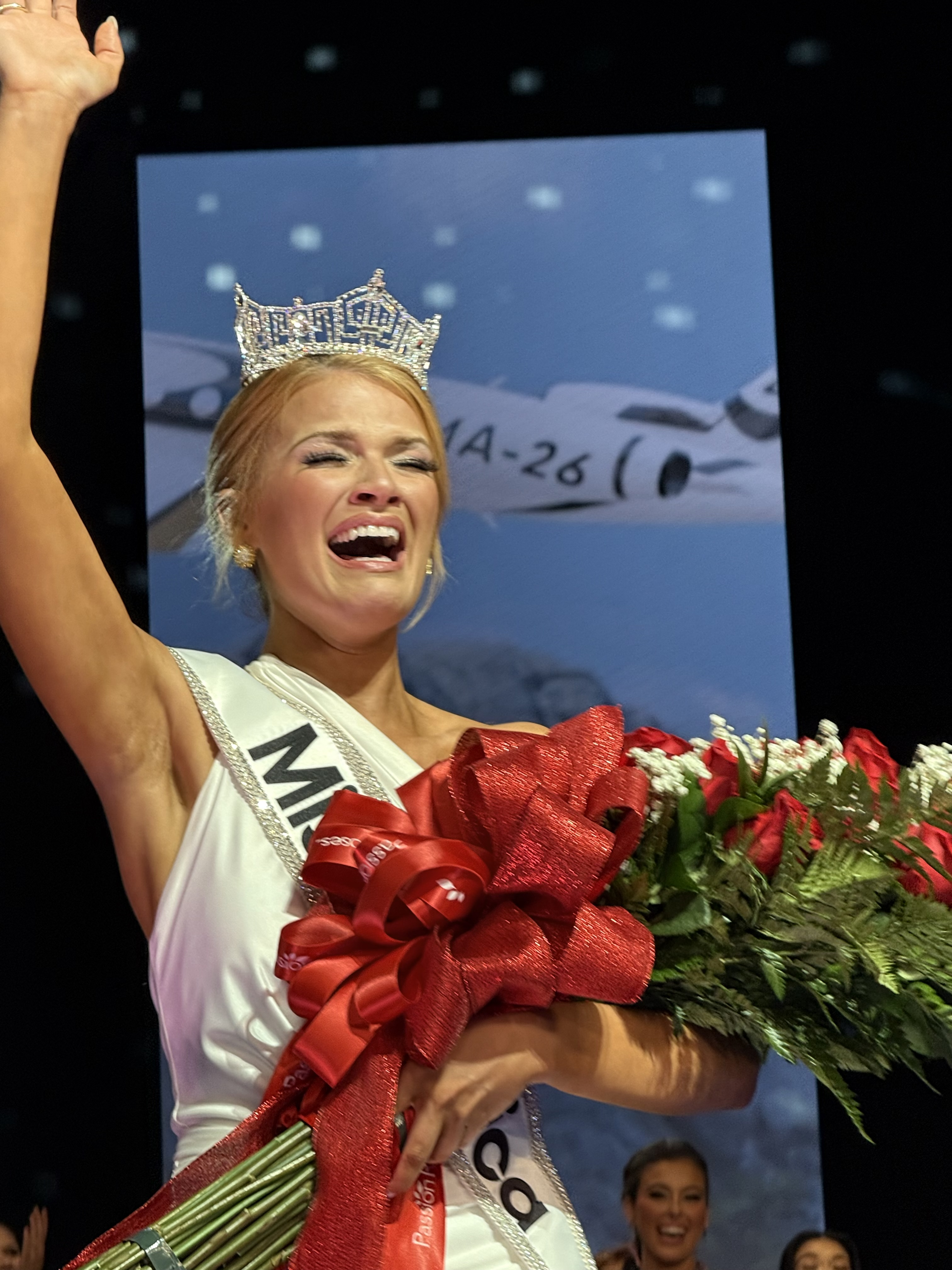
- Cassie Donegan
- Date: September 7, 2025
- Presenters: Nikki Novak; Billy Gilman
- Venue: Walt Disney Theater at Dr. Phillips Center for the Performing Arts, Orlando, Florida
- Broadcaster: Miss America Website (Note: On behalf of Pageant Vision streaming website)
- Entrants: 52
- Placements: 11
- Winner: Cassie Donegan; New York

Miss America 2026 was the 98th Miss America pageant, held inside the Walt Disney Theater, located at the Dr. Phillips Center for the Performing Arts in Orlando, Florida, alongside the Miss America's Teen 2026 competition on September 6 and 7, 2025, respectively. This was the first time since 2018 that it returned to its traditional September schedule.

At the end of the event, Abbie Stockard of Alabama crowned Cassie Donegan of New York as her successor. It is the eighth victory of New York in the pageant.

== Results ==
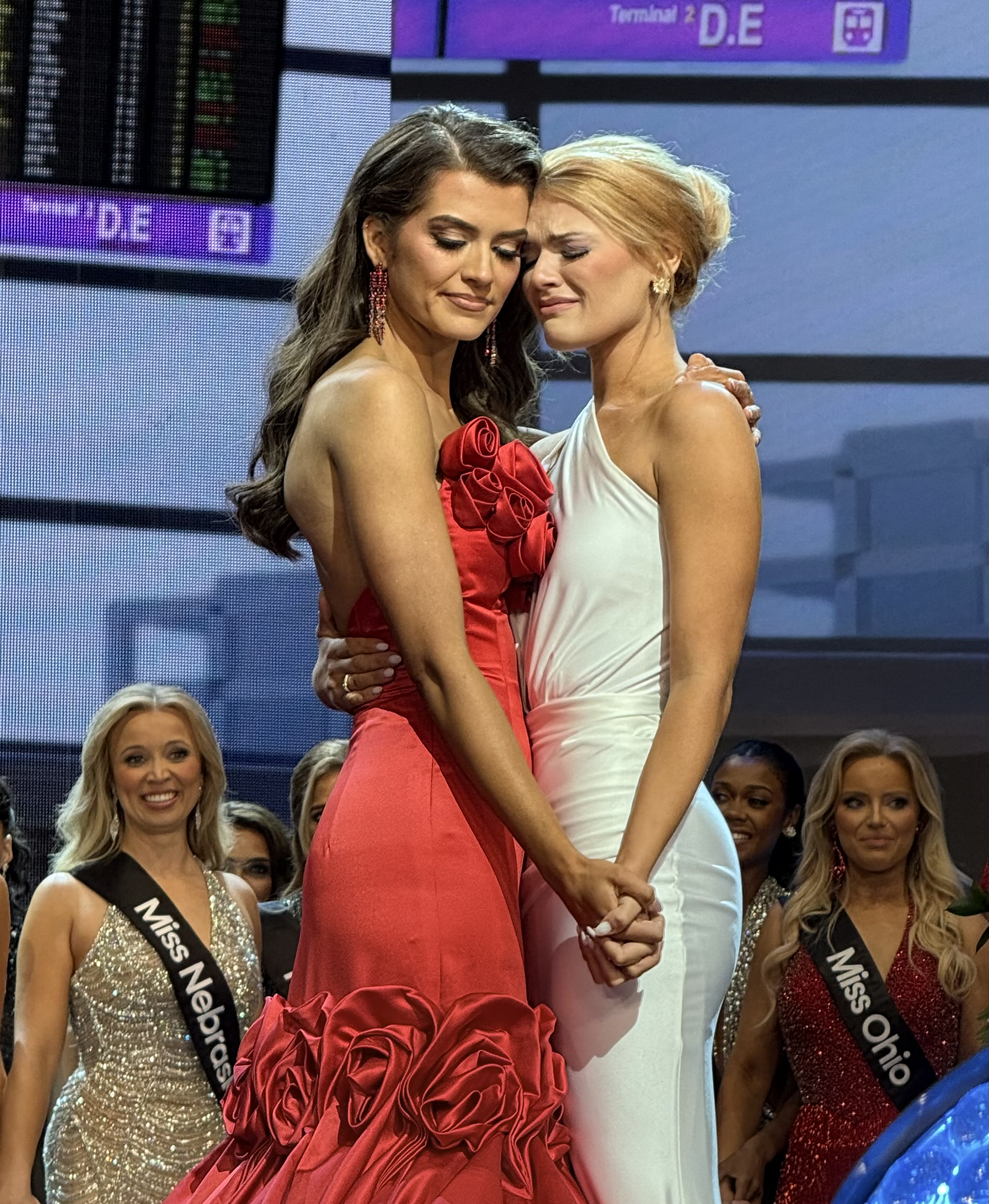
Top two Cassie Donegan of New York (right) and Sadie Schiermeyer of Texas (left)

=== Placements ===
Placement	Contestant
Miss America 2026	Cassie Donegan (New York)
1st Runner-Up	Sadie Schiermeyer (Texas)
2nd Runner-Up	Paris Richardson (Florida)
3rd Runner-Up	Audrey Kittila (Georgia)
4th Runner-Up	Emma Terry (Alabama)
Top 11	Kennedy Holland (Arkansas); Nitsaniyah Fitch (Illinois); Ariana Rodriguez (Kentucky); Maria Derisavi (Maryland); Anna Leah Jolly (Mississippi); Zoe Schiederich (Tennessee)

== Awards ==
=== Preliminary Awards ===
Award	Contestants
Evening Gown	Illinois – Nitsaniyah Fitch; Maryland – Maria Derisavi; District of Columbia – Katie Wadman
Talent	Arkansas – Kennedy Holland; New York – Cassie Donegan; Utah – Jordyn Bristol
Fitness	Florida – Paris Richardson; Tennessee – Zoe Scheiderich; Colorado – Gabby Gramont

=== Quality of Life ===
Results	Contestants
Winner	Florida – Paris Richardson
1st Runner-Up	South Carolina – Sarah Kay Wrenn
2nd Runner-Up	Alabama – Emma Terry
Finalists	New York – Cassie Donegan
Finalists	Mississippi – Anna Leah Jolly
Finalists	Rhode Island – Alexia Rodrigues
Finalists	Michigan – Hannah Palmer

=== AHA Go Red for Women Leadership Award ===
Results	Contestants
Winner	South Carolina – Sarah Kay Wrenn
Regional	Alabama – Emma Terry
Regional	New Hampshire – Xanthi Russell
Regional	Illinois – Nitsaniyah Fitch
Regional	Oregon – Mya Cash
Regional	Missouri – Courtney Rowe
Regional	New York – Cassie Donegan

=== "Show Us Your Shoes" Award ===
State	Contestants
Hawaii	Emalia Dalire
Louisiana	Gabrelle McLeod
Wyoming	Anna-Claire Musick

== Contestants ==
- Declared as winner
- Ended as a runner-up
- Ended as a semi-finalist

The confirmed contestants are as follows:
State/District	Contestant	Age	Hometown	Placement	Notes
Alabama	Emma Terry	22	Hoover	4th runner-up	1st runner-up at Miss Alabama's Outstanding Teen 2020, later assumed title after Marcelle LeBlanc won Miss America's Outstanding Teen 2022
Alaska	Suparat Prasannet	27	Lake Hood		
Arizona	Tiffany Ellington	25	Peoria		
Arkansas	Kennedy Holland	21	Metro	Top 11	
California	Rachel Axt	24	Clovis		2021 National American Miss California
Colorado	Gabby Gramont	22	Fort Collins		
Connecticut	Cayla Kumar	22	Hamden		Previously Miss New York's Outstanding Teen 2018
Delaware	Hailey Mack	19	Ocean View		
District of Columbia	Katie Wadman	24	Logan Circle		Previously Miss Iowa USA 2021
Florida	Paris Richardson	23	Gainesville	2nd runner-up	
Georgia	Audrey Kittila	22	Atlanta	3rd runner-up	
Hawaii	Emalia Dalire	19	Kane'ohe		Previously Miss Hawaii Teen Volunteer 2024
Idaho	Ellie Daniels	18	Bonneville		
Illinois	Nitsaniyah Fitch	26	Windy City	Top 11	
Indiana	Kinley Shoemaker	20	Metropolitan		Previously Miss Indiana Teen USA 2023
Iowa	Lydia Fisher	22	Tanglewood		Previously Miss Iowas's Outstanding Teen 2017
Kansas	Emily Rugg	26	Meadowlark		
Kentucky	Ariana Rodriguez	20	Bardstown	Top 11	
Louisiana	Gabrelle McLeod	21	Cane River		
Maine	Paige Lessard	24	York County		USA National Miss Maine Teen 2019 2021 National Elite Miss
Maryland	Maria Derisavi	22	St. Mary's County	Top 11	Previously Miss Maryland Teen USA 2021
Massachusetts	Khailah Griffin	26	Cambridge		
Michigan	Hannah Palmer	24	Spirit of the State		
Minnesota	Emma Vrieze	20	Glacial Waters		
Mississippi	Anna Leah Jolly	23	Capital City	Top 11	
Missouri	Courtney Rowe	23	Kansas City		
Montana	Haley Tate	25	Missoula		
Nebraska	Makinzie Gergory	25	Old West Balloon Fest		
Nevada	Abigail Bachman	27	Henderson		Miss Nevada Volunteer 2024
New Hampshire	Xanthi Russell	23	Lilac State		
New Jersey	Belle Nicholas	27	Seashore Line		
New Mexico	Madyson Kettler	TBD	Corrales		
New York	Cassie Donegan	27	Manhattan	Winner	Originally first runner-up, but assumed the title after original winner Mina Liang resigned the title three days after she was crowned Previously Miss Virginia's Outstanding Teen 2013
North Carolina	Sophia Kellstrom	26	Davidson County		
North Dakota	Kennedy Delap	24	Central Dakota		
Ohio	Olivia Fosson	24	Ohio River		
Oklahoma	Tessa Dorrell	22	Broken Arrow		
Oregon	Mya Cash	23	Lane County		
Pennsylvania	Victoria Vespico	25	Northeastern Pennsylvania		
Puerto Rico	Diann Reyes-Basilio	20	San Juan		
Rhode Island	Alexia Rodrigues	25	Warwick		
South Carolina	Sarah Wrenn	24	Lake Murray		Previously Top 10 at Miss South Carolina 2024 as Miss Greenville County, Top 10 at Miss South Carolina 2023 as Miss Capital City, and 3rd Runner-Up at Miss South Carolina 2022 as Miss Greenville County; also previously Top 10 at Miss South Carolina Teen 2017 as Miss Greater Easley Teen and Top 10 at Miss South Carolina Teen 2018 as Miss Spartanburg Teen
South Dakota	Jamee Katner	21	Siouxland		
Tennessee	Zoe Scheiderich	22	Music City	Top 11	
Texas	Sadie Schiermeyer	22	Richardson	1st runner-up	Mother Arian Archer was previously Miss Texas 1994. First legacy to hold the state crown.
Utah	Jordyn Bristol	26	Timpanogos		
Vermont	Sophia Parker	26	Addison County		
Virginia	Madison Whitbeck	20	Arlington		
Washington	Amber Pike	24	Snohomish		
West Virginia	Courtney Bearer	23	Morgantown		
Wisconsin	Willow Newell	22	Racine		The first Black woman to win the title of Miss Wisconsin.
Wyoming	Anna-Claire Musick	27	Cheyenne		
