= Miss West Virginia =

Beauty pageant competition

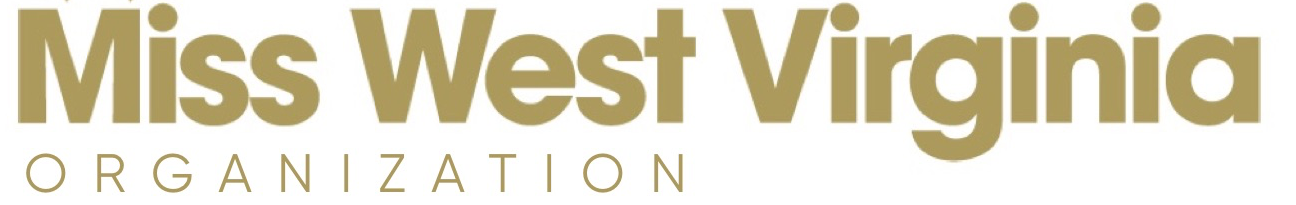
- Formation: 1922
- Type: Beauty pageant
- Headquarters: Martinsburg
- Location: West Virginia
- Members: Miss America
- Official language: English
- Leader: Shelley Nichols-Franklin
- Website: Official website

The Miss West Virginia competition is the pageant that selects the representative for the U.S. state of West Virginia in the Miss America Pageant.

In the fall of 2018, the Miss America Organization terminated the Miss West Virginia organization's license as well as licenses from Florida, Georgia, New Jersey, New York, Pennsylvania, and Tennessee.

The Miss America Organization reinstated the license to Shelley Nichols-Franklin of Martinsburg who was the former executive director of Miss Berkeley County (WV) between 2000 and 2019.

With Alaska became the latest state crowned the Miss America title, West Virginia is one of the few states along with Maine, South Dakota and Wyoming that has yet to win a Miss America, Miss USA, or Miss Teen USA title.

Elizabeth Romanek of Wheeling was crowned Miss West Virginia on June 20, 2026, at the Airborne Event Center in Martinsburg, West Virginia. She will compete for the title of Miss America 2027.

== Results summary ==
The following is a visual summary of the past results of Miss West Virginia titleholders at the national Miss America pageants/competitions. The year in parentheses indicates the year of the national competition during which a placement and/or award was garnered, not the year attached to the contestant's state title.

=== Placements ===
- 2nd runners-up: Ella Dee Kessel (1965)
- 3rd runners-up: Elizabeth Lynch (2023)
- Top 10: Deborah Davis (1980), Danae DeMasi (2002)
- Top 15: Lillian Ward (1927), Juanita Park Wright (1940), Joan Elizabeth Estep (1947), Phyllis Walker (1952), Chelsea Malone (2016)
- Top 16: Norma Lee Salisbury (1946)
- Top 18: Mildred Fetty (1933)

=== Awards ===
==== Preliminary awards ====
- Preliminary Evening Gown: Danae DeMasi (2002)
- Preliminary Lifestyle and Fitness: Ella Dee Kessel (1965), Cynthia Sims (1994)

==== Non-finalist awards ====
- Non-finalist Interview: Leah Lasker (1992)
- Non-finalist Talent: Karen Childers (1964), Lois Gay Ratcliff (1966), Judith Shoup (1970), Mary Derry (1975), Patricia Paugh (1978), Kari Safford (1997), Paige Madden (2015)

==== Other awards ====
- Duke of Edinburgh Silver Award: Morgan Breeden (2016)
- Fruit of the Loom Award: Melissa Costello (1991)

== Winners ==
- Declared as winner
- Ended as a runner-up
- Ended as a finalist or semi-finalist

Year	Name	Hometown	Age	Local Title	Miss America Talent	Placement at Miss America	Special scholarships at Miss America	Notes
2026	Elizabeth Romanek	Wheeling	24	Miss Morgantown	Jazz Dance			
2025	Courtney Bearer	Morgantown	23	Miss Morgantown	Hula Hoop Dance			
2024	Jennifer Reuther	Wheeling	26	Miss Tri-State Area	Jazz Dance			
2023	Karrington Childress	Charles Town	21	Miss Shenandoah	Original Monologue			
2022	Elizabeth Lynch	Martinsburg	25	Miss Jefferson County	Original Monologue	3rd Runner-Up		
2021	Jaelyn Wratchford	Martinsburg	20	Miss Jefferson County	Original Monologue			
2019–20	Toriane Graal	Morgantown	25	Miss Tygart Valley	Baton Twirling, music from Man of La Mancha			Former featured twirler for West Virginia University's Pride of the Mountaineer Marching Band
2018	Madeline Collins	Charleston	23	Miss Elkins Area	Jazz Dance, "Shake Your Groove Thing"			
2017	Tamia Hardy	Martinsburg	22	Miss Berkeley County	Hip Hop Dance, "BURNITUP!" by Janet Jackson			First African American woman crowned Miss West Virginia 2nd Runner Up at Miss West Virginia USA Pageant
2016	Morgan Breeden	Charles Town	21	Miss Jefferson County	Piano		Duke of Edinburgh Silver Award	Previously Miss West Virginia's Outstanding Teen 2012 Contestant at National Sweetheart 2015 pageant Aunt of Miss West Virginia's Teen 2024, Demi Breeden
2015	Chelsea Malone	Morgantown	23	Miss Wheeling	Vocal, "Over You"	Top 15		
2014	Paige Madden	Moundsville	21	Miss Southern West Virginia	Vocal, "Gravity"		Non-finalist Talent Award	
2013	Miranda Harrison	Charleston	19	Miss Southern West Virginia	Vocal, "Feeling Good"			
2012	Kaitlin Gates	Bridgeport	20	Miss Harrison County	Vocal, "Since I Fell for You"			Previously Miss West Virginia's Outstanding Teen 2006
2011	Spenser Wempe	Shepherdstown	18	Miss North Eastern	Dance, "Hallelujah"			Contestant at National Sweetheart 2010 pageant
2010	Cali Young	Glen Dale	24	Miss Northern West Virginia	Jazz Dance, "I've Got 'Cha"			
2009	Talia Markham	Ripley	22	Miss Capital City	Vocal, "Take My Hand, Precious Lord"			
2008	Kayla Lynam	Short Gap	21	Miss Eastern Panhandle	Piano			Previously West Virginia's Junior Miss 2005
2007	Summer Wyatt	Athens	21	Miss Capital City	Vocal, "Why Haven't I Heard from You"			2nd runner-up at Miss West Virginia USA 2013 pageant
2006	Tiffany Lawrence	Shepherdstown	24	Miss Jefferson County	Vocal, "Black Velvet"			
2005	Kimberly Goodwin	Morgantown	21	Miss Morgantown	Tap Dance			
2004	Julia Burton	Petersburg	22	Miss Southern West Virginia	Vocal, "The Promise"			
2003	Allison Williams	Charles Town	22	Miss Mountain State	Vocal, "Where the Boys Are"			
2002	Janna Kerns	Terra Alta	23	Miss Morgantown	Vocal, "There You'll Be"			
2001	Danae DeMasi	Morgantown	20	Miss Appalachia	Ballet en Pointe, "Ravendhi"	Top 10	Preliminary Evening Gown Award	
2000	Jodi Clark	Moundsville	22	Miss Point Pleasant	Ballet en Pointe, "Who Will Love Me As I Am?" from Side Show			Contestant at National Sweetheart 1999 pageant
1999	Lucy Ours	Petersburg	22	Miss Mason County	Vocal, "He Grew the Tree"			
1998	Amy Townsend	Morgantown	23	Miss Marion County Area	Vocal, "Hopelessly Devoted to You" from Grease			
1997	Eisa Krushansky	Westover	24	Miss North Central	Tap Dance, "Dancin' Fool" from Copacabana			
1996	Kari Safford	Point Pleasant	23	Miss Ohio Valley	Vocal, "God Help the Outcasts"		Non-finalist Talent Award	
1995	Elizabeth McIntyre	Dunbar	24	Miss Appalachia	Clogging, "Dance"			
1994	Jennifer Bopp	Elkins	22	Miss South Central	Vocal, "It's Only a Paper Moon"			
1993	Cynthia Sims	Vienna	22	Miss Ohio Valley	Vocal, "There! I've Said It Again"		Preliminary Swimsuit Award	
1992	Kimberly Parrish	Parkersburg	22	Miss Marion County Area	Contemporary Ballet en Pointe, "Part of Your World"			
1991	Leah Lasker	Bluefield	23	Miss Mercer County	Tap Dance, "I'm a Brass Band" from Sweet Charity		Non-finalist Interview Award	
1990	Melissa Costello	Shenandoah Junction	20	Miss Jefferson County	Vocal, "Hurt"		Fruit of the Loom Award	
1989	Lisa Bittinger	Fairmont	21	Miss North Central	Vocal, "Wishing You Were Somehow Here Again" from The Phantom of the Opera			
1988	Lisa Seagroves	Morgantown	24	Miss North Central	Tap Dance, "They're Playing Our Song"			Contestant at National Sweetheart 1985 pageant as Miss Georgia
1987	Saundra Patton	Morgantown	22	Miss North Central	Variety Act			
1986	Shannon Barill	Charleston	23	Miss Charleston Area	Jazz en Pointe			
1985	Rebecca Porterfield	Martinsburg	21	Miss Berkeley County	Jazz Dance, "Dance Attack"			
1984	Melanne Pennington	Cross Lanes	24	Miss Kanawha County	Semi-classical Vocal, "One Kiss" from The New Moon			Died of leukemia in 1988
1983	Andrea Lynn Patrick	Morgantown	23	Miss West Virginia University	Tap Dance, "Malagueña" & "España cañí"			Previously Miss Pennsylvania USA 1980
1982	Kelly Lea Anderson	Clarksburg	21	Miss Harrison County	Stylized Can-Can			Later Miss West Virginia USA 1984; 1st runner-up at Miss USA 1984 pageant Top 7 finalist at Miss World 1984 pageant
1981	Candy Cohen	Huntington	24	Miss Marshall University	Tap Dance, "How High the Moon"			
1980	Pamela Ellen Paugh	Charleston	21	Miss South Charleston	Vocal, "Anytime"			Sister of Miss West Virginia 1977, Patricia Paugh
1979	Deborah Davis	Huntington	22	Miss Southern West Virginia	Vocal Medley, "He Touched Me" from Drat! The Cat! & "Maybe This Time" from Cabaret	Top 10		Previously Miss West Virginia USA 1978 Later Mrs. America 1984; 1st runner-up at Mrs. World pageant
1978	Ivy Meadows	St. Albans	22	Miss South Charleston	Interpretive Dance, "Brian's Song"			
1977	Patricia Paugh	Parkersburg	20	Miss Parkersburg Area	Original Dramatic Monologue, "Deadline"		Non-finalist Talent Award	Sister of Miss West Virginia 1980, Pamela Paugh Mother of JonBenét Ramsey
1976	Teresa Lucas	Elkins	22	Miss Fayette County	Gymnastics Routine			
1975	Kristi Wick	South Charleston	20	Miss South Charleston	Vocal, "Am I Blue?"			
1974	Mary Derry	Morgantown	21	Miss West Virginia University	Semi-classical Vocal, "Cycles"		Non-finalist Talent Award	
1973	Myra Elizabeth "Beth" McVey	Huntington	20	Miss Huntington	Classical Vocal, "Quando me'n vo'"			
1972	Lynette Koper	Weirton	21	Miss Huntington	Presentation of Original Art Works			
1971	Deborah Lambert	Morgantown	19	Miss West Virginia University	Piano, "What the World Needs Now Is Love"			
1970	Linda Dianne Barnett	Parkersburg	19	Miss Wood County	Modern Jazz Dance, "The Electric Indian"			
1969	Judith Shoup	Gibsonia, Pennsylvania	22	Miss West Virginia University	Vocal Medley & French Horn, "Days of Wine and Roses," "A Taste of Honey," & "I've Gotta Be Me"		Non-finalist Talent Award	
1968	Charlotte Warwick	Charleston	22	Miss Morris-Harvey College	Semi-classical Vocal, "The Impossible Dream"			
1967	Helen Morgan	Lewisburg	19	Miss Beckley	Toe & Acrobatic Dance, "Teakwood Nocturne" by Roger Williams			
1966	Judith Skunda	Weirton	18	Miss Weirton	Dramatic Monologue			
1965	Lois Gay Ratcliff	Bluefield	19	Miss Greater Bluefield	Dramatic Reading, "Lonesome Train"		Non-finalist Talent Award	
1964	Ella Dee Kessel	Ripley	21	Miss Morgantown	Piano, "Three Preludes" by Gershwin	2nd runner-up	Preliminary Swimsuit Award	
1963	Karen Childers	South Charleston		Miss Marshall University	Dramatic Reading from "The Yellow Wallpaper"		Non-finalist Talent Award	
1962	Diane Hunter	Arlington, Virginia	20	Miss Morgantown	Dance & Dramatic Sketch			
1961	Carole Johnson	Rivesville	Vocal & Dance, "Hey, Look Me Over" from Wildcat & "You Can't Get a Man with a Gun" from Annie Get Your Gun	Miss Morgantown			Later Miss West Virginia World 1962	
1960	Mary Hoback	Bluefield	18	Miss Bluefield	Original Dramatic Reading			
1959	Janet Hill	Nitro	21	Miss Nitro	Dramatic Reading			
1958	Sandra Boyd	Fairmont			Vocal, "Money Honey"			
1957	Janice Sickle	Fairmont			Vocal & Dance			
1956	Carolyn Jane Miller	Martinsburg	19		Drama			Carolyn Jane (Miller) Miller died at 84 on April 17, 2021.
1955	Mary Fryman	Madison			Vocal			
1954	Miriam Reep	Clarksburg			Dance			
1953	Patricia Stewart	Pineville			Vocal & Impersonations			
1952	Nancy Rohrbough	Grafton			Dance			
1951	Phyllis Walker	Charleston			Drama	Top 15		
1950	No West Virginia representative at Miss America pageant							
1949	Georganne Steiss	Barrackville			Piano			
1948	Jane Queen	Huntington			Vocal & Piano			
1947	Joan Elizabeth Estep	Wheeling			Piano, Rhapsody in Blue	Top 15		
1946	Norma Lee Salisbury	Parkersburg				Top 16		
1945	No West Virginia representative at Miss America pageant							
1944	Sharon Allyson Scott							
1943	No West Virginia representative at Miss America pageant							
1942	No West Virginia representative at Miss America pageant							
1941	Juanita Park Wright	Huntington						
1940	Juanita Park Wright	Huntington		Miss Huntington		Top 15		Multiple West Virginia representatives Contestants competed under local title at Miss America pageant
1940	Mary Schlarmann Bowles	Montgomery		Miss West Virginia				Multiple West Virginia representatives Contestants competed under local title at Miss America pageant
1939	No West Virginia representative at Miss America pageant							
1938	No West Virginia representative at Miss America pageant							
1937	No West Virginia representative at Miss America pageant							
1936	No West Virginia representative at Miss America pageant							
1935	No West Virginia representative at Miss America pageant							
1934	No national pageant was held							
1933	Mildred Fetty		20	Miss West Virginia University	N/A	Top 18		
1932	No national pageants were held							
1931	No national pageants were held							
1930	No national pageants were held							
1929	No national pageants were held							
1928	No national pageants were held							
1927	Lillian Ward	Huntington		Miss Huntington	N/A	Top 15		Multiple West Virginia representatives Contestants competed under local title at national pageant
1927	Mildred Dorothy Bright	Wheeling		Miss Wheeling	N/A			Multiple West Virginia representatives Contestants competed under local title at national pageant
1926	Olive Davis	Huntington		Miss Huntington	N/A			Multiple West Virginia representatives Contestants competed under local title at national pageant
1926	Mary Cecilia Cresap	Wheeling		Miss Wheeling	N/A			Multiple West Virginia representatives Contestants competed under local title at national pageant
1925	Eleanor McCracken	Huntington		Miss Huntington	N/A			Competed under local title at national pageant
1924	No West Virginia representative at Miss America pageant							
1923	Neva Jackson	Philippi		Miss West Virginia	N/A			Competed under local title at national pageant
1922	Mary Dague	Wheeling		Miss Wheeling	N/A			Competed under local title at national pageant
1921	No West Virginia representative at Miss America pageant							
