= Chelsea Malone =

American beauty pageant winner

- Born: Chelsea Jean Malone; April 8, 1992 (age 34); Morgantown, West Virginia
- Education: West Virginia University
- Beauty pageant titleholder
- Title: Miss Capital City 2013; Miss Northern West Virginia 2014; Miss Wheeling 2015; Miss West Virginia 2015
- Hair color: Blonde
- Major competition: Miss America 2016

Chelsea Jean Malone (born April 8, 1992) is an American beauty pageant titleholder from Morgantown, West Virginia, who was crowned Miss West Virginia 2015. She competed for the Miss America 2016 title in September 2015 and placed in the Top 15.

== Pageant career ==
=== Early contests ===
Malone began singing publicly at age 9 and started regularly performing "The Star-Spangled Banner" before West Virginia Mountaineers men's basketball games when she was 12. While a student at Morgantown High School, she won the West Virginia Idol competition in 2008 which earned her an audition for American Idol.

As a student at West Virginia University, Malone won the Mountaineer Idol 2011 title. In July 2013, she won Jacktown Fair Idol in Wind Ridge, Pennsylvania, taking home $1,000 in cash plus 15 hours of studio recording time.

=== Early pageants ===
In February 2013, Malone won the Miss Capital City 2013 title. She competed in the 2013 Miss West Virginia pageant on a platform of "Mental Health Advocacy at its CORE: Community Outreach, Research, and Education" and performed a vocal in the talent portion of the competition. She was named was third runner-up for the state title.

On August 3, 2013, Malone won the Miss Northern West Virginia 2014 title. She competed in the 2014 Miss West Virginia pageant on a platform of "Mental Health Advocacy at the CORE: Community Outreach, Research, and Education" and performed a country music vocal in the talent portion of the competition.

=== Miss West Virginia 2015 ===
On July 26, 2014, Malone was crowned Miss Wheeling 2015. She was one of 21 women who qualified to compete in the 2015 Miss West Virginia pageant at the Metropolitan Theatre in Morgantown. Malone's competition talent was a vocal performance. Her platform is "Mental Health Advocacy at the CORE: Community Outreach, Research, and Education".

Malone won the competition on Wednesday, July 1, 2015, when she received her crown from outgoing Miss West Virginia titleholder Paige Madden. She earned several thousand dollars in scholarship money and prizes from the state pageant. As Miss West Virginia, her activities include public appearances across the state of West Virginia.

=== Vying for Miss America 2016 ===
Malone was West Virginia's representative at the Miss America 2016 pageant in Atlantic City, New Jersey, in September 2015. In the televised finale on September 13, 2015, she placed in the Top 15 as a semi-finalist but was eliminated after the swimsuit competition. Malone was awarded a $4,000 scholarship prize.

== Early life and education ==
Malone is a native of Morgantown, West Virginia. She is a 2010 graduate of Morgantown High School. Malone is a graduate of West Virginia University with a bachelor's degree in finance. While a student at WVU, Malone became a member of the Alpha Phi Omega national co-ed service fraternity.

Awards and achievements
Preceded by Paige Madden	Miss West Virginia; 2015	Succeeded by Morgan Hope Breeden
