= Regan Hutsell =

American beauty pageant titleholder

- Regan Hutsell, Miss America 2027
- Born: December 12, 2000 (age 25); Houston, Texas, U.S.
- Education: Feijoo Ballet School
- Occupation: Dancer
- Known for: Miss America 2027
- Title: Miss Houston 2026; Miss Texas 2026; Miss America 2027
- Term: September 6, 2026 – present
- Predecessor: Cassie Donegan

Regan Elizabeth Hutsell (born December 12, 2000) is an American dancer and beauty pageant titleholder who won Miss America 2027. She previously held the title of Miss Texas 2026. She is the fourth woman from Texas to win the Miss America title.

== Early life and dance career ==
Hutsell was born in Houston, Texas, and trained at Feijoo Ballet School in Texas. She began dancing at the age of four.

In 2019, at age 18, Hutsell joined The Rockettes and performed during the 2019 and 2020 seasons. She joined the Birmingham Royal Ballet in 2021.

== Pageantry ==
Representing as Miss Houston, Hutsell won Miss Texas on June 27, 2026, at the Eisemann Center in Richardson, Texas. Her community service initiative, "Your Body Is Your Home", focuses on body image and physical and mental well-being.

Hutsell represented Texas at Miss America 2027, where she performed a jazz dance to "Le Jazz Hot" and won preliminary awards in talent and fitness. She won the national title on September 6, 2026, in West Palm Beach, Florida, succeeding Cassie Donegan.

Awards and achievements
Preceded by Cassie Donegan	Miss America; 2027	Incumbent
Preceded by Sadie Schiermeyer	Miss Texas; 2026	Succeeded by Stephanie Wendt
