= Allison Williams (Miss West Virginia) =

American model

- Born: Allison Williams c. 1981 (age 44–45)
- Beauty pageant titleholder
- Title: Miss West Virginia 2003
- Hair color: Blonde
- Eye color: Green
- Major competition: Miss America 2004

Allison Williams (born c. 1981) is a beauty queen from Morgantown, West Virginia, who was crowned Miss West Virginia 2003. She competed in the Miss America 2004 pageant but was unplaced.

== Sex tape lawsuit ==
Williams sued 59 defendants in countries such as the United States, Australia, South Africa, and The Netherlands for posting a sex video allegedly showing her in the back of a WVEC news van. She first discovered the video in August 2004 during her first week at law school. Her spokeswoman Lavinia Mann Cummings said, "These Web sites allege that the woman in the video is Miss West Virginia, but it's not", adding, "Some sites even had her pageant picture next to the video."

Williams won a $7.2 million verdict against nine Internet companies and individuals who tried to sell pornographic videos they falsely claimed featured her.

Preceded by Jana Kerns	Miss West Virginia; 2003	Succeeded by Julia Burton
