= Miss America 2024 =

96th edition of the Miss America competition

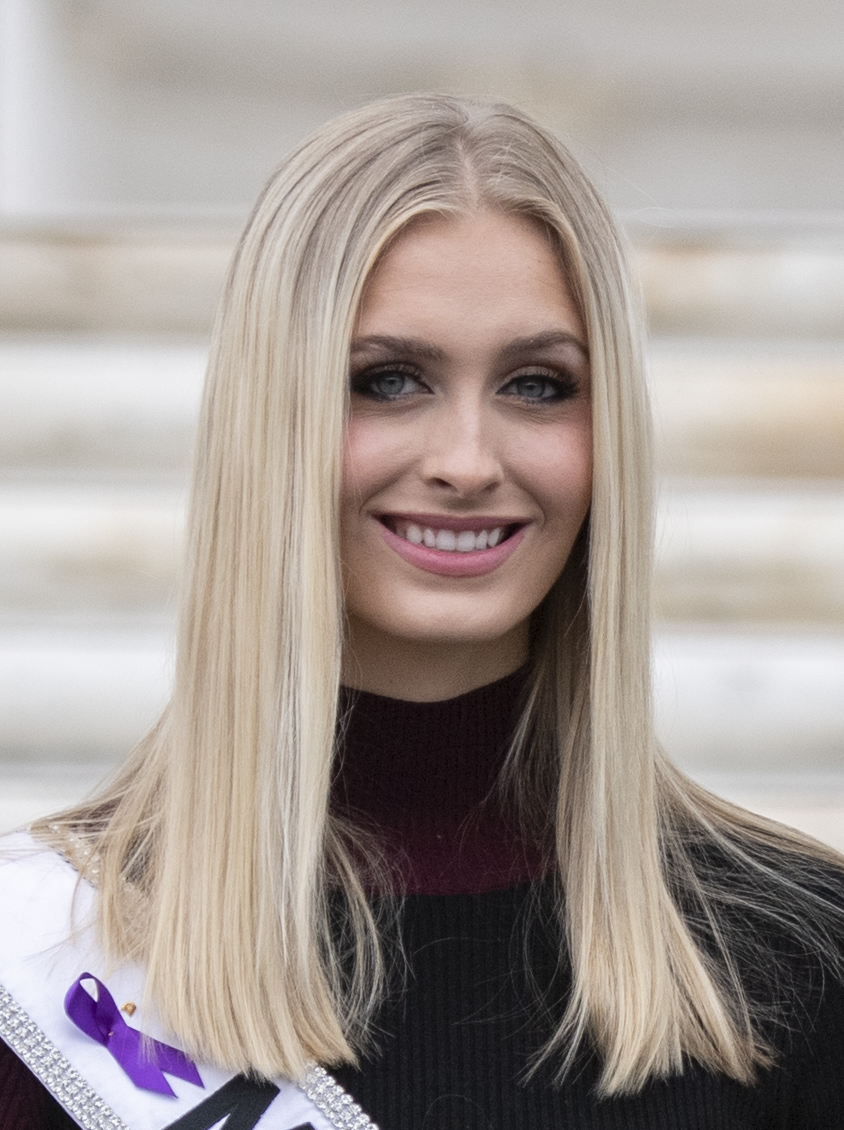
- Madison Marsh
- Date: January 14, 2024
- Presenters: Nikki Novak; Terrence J
- Venue: Walt Disney Theater, Orlando, Florida
- Broadcaster: Miss America Website (Note: On behalf of Pageant Vision streaming website)
- Entrants: 51
- Placements: 11
- Winner: Madison Marsh; Colorado
- Congeniality: Cydney Bridges; Indiana

Miss America 2024 was the 96th Miss America pageant, held at the Dr. Phillips Center for the Performing Arts in Orlando, Florida, alongside the Miss America's Teen 2024 competition, on January 14, 2024.

Grace Stanke of Wisconsin crowned her successor Madison Marsh of Colorado at the end of the event.

== Background ==
Miss America 2024 was the 96th installment of the pageant, but the 102nd Miss America anniversary. For the 2024 competition, the age limits to compete were raised to between 18 and 28. Contestants must also be a United States resident or citizen, and meet the particular residency requirements of the states, municipalities, and districts they represent.

As part of changes made at the Miss America Scholarship Program by new CEO Robin Fleming in 2023, all state competitions and the Miss America Competition held a fitness competition segment, and contestants were allowed to choose between competing in the talent competition or a speech competition called "HER Story." The talent competition had previously been required since 1938. The 2024 competition was the first Miss America competition since 2018 where contestants competed in a fitness category.

U.S. state contests occurred during the spring and summer of 2023.

== Results ==
=== Placements ===
Placement	Contestant
Miss America 2024	Madison Marsh (Colorado)
1st Runner-Up	Ellie Breaux (Texas)
2nd Runner-Up	Cydney Bridges (Indiana)
3rd Runner-Up	Mallory Hudson (Kentucky)
4th Runner-Up	Caroline Parente (Rhode Island)
Top 11	Cori Keller (Arkansas); Juliette Valle (Florida); Courtney Wages (Kansas); Kennedy Taylor (Maryland); Amelia Collins (New York); Taylor Loyd (North Carolina)

== Preliminary awards ==
Award	Contestant
Evening Gown	Alabama – Brianna Burrell; Maryland – Kennedy Taylor; Texas – Ellie Breaux
Fitness	Maryland – Kennedy Taylor; Mississippi – Vivian O'Neal; Tennessee – Brandee Mills
Talent	Maine – Veronica Druchniak; Michigan – Maya Schuhknecht; North Carolina – Taylor Loyd

== Contestants ==
51 contestants competed for the title.

State	Name	Age (Note: Ages at the time of state crowning)	Hometown	Talent or HERstory	Community Service Initiative (CSI)	Placement	Special awards	Notes
Alabama	Brianna Burrell	25	Mobile	Vocal	SAVE-A-STEM		Preliminary Evening Gown	
Alaska	Hannah Utic	21	Anchorage	Piano/Vocal	Civic Involvement Through Informed Voting			
Arizona	Tiffany Ticlo	21	Chandler	Vocal	STEAM Education: Bringing Science and the Arts to All Students			Sister of Miss Arizona 2018 and Miss Arizona USA 2022, Isabel Ticlo
Arkansas	Cori Keller	25	Stuttgart	Tap Dance	Feeding the Future: Collaborative Solutions to Hunger	Top 11		
California	Sabrina Lewis	26	Berkeley	HERstory	Equine Therapy: Healing Hearts with Horses			Previously Miss California USA 2021
Colorado	Madison Marsh	22	Colorado Springs	HERstory	The Whitney Marsh Foundation - Early Detection of Pancreatic Cancer	Winner		Graduate of the United States Air Force Academy First active-duty officer and graduate of a military service academy to compete at Miss America Cousin of Miss Arkansas Teen USA 2021 and Miss Arkansas USA 2024 Madeline Bohlman
Connecticut	Gina Carloto	28	New Haven	Dance	The Grace Collective			
Delaware	Emily Beale	27	Dagsboro	Tap Dance	Protect, Preserve, Conserve: Environmental Advocacy			
District of Columbia	Jude Maboné	27	Washington, D.C.	Operatic Vocal	Check Your Heart			
Florida	Juliette Valle	22	Fort Lauderdale	Operatic Vocal	The Power of Chronic Kidney Disease Prevention	Top 11		
Georgia	Tara Schiphof	25	King	Lyrical Dance	#YesYouCan			
Hawaii	Star Dahl-Thurston	25	Honolulu	Slam Poetry	Kahua Kollective			
Idaho	Reagan Yamauchi	22	Soda Springs	Piano	Motivated 2 Move			First contestant to perform a basketball routine on stage
Illinois	Jessica Tilton	25	Washington	Color Guard	Donate Life - Advocating for Organ Donation		Charles and Theresa Brown Scholarship Recipient	First woman to compete a flag color guard performance as a talent at Miss America
Indiana	Cydney Bridges	22	Fort Wayne	Vocal	The Power of Mentoring	Second Runner-up	Miss Congeniality	
Iowa	Alysa Goethe	23	Bettendorf	Vocal	Not Your Type: Advocating for Type 1 Diabetes			
Kansas	Courtney Wages	25	Wichita	Tap Dance	One Vision is Not the Only Vision	Top 11		
Kentucky	Mallory Hudson	22	Bowling Green	Vocal	Inclusive Stages	Third Runner-up		
Louisiana	Makenzie Scroggs	20	Marksville	Dance	Being True to Being You			
Maine	Veronica Druchniak	27	Standish	Dance	Make a Small Change		Preliminary Talent Award	
Maryland	Kennedy Taylor	26	Silver Spring	Salsa Dance	CyberSafeKids	Top 11	Preliminary Evening Gown; Preliminary Fitness	Top 10 at Miss America's Outstanding Teen
Massachusetts	Chelsea Vuong	25	Cambridge	Piano	Dollars and "Sense" for Financial Freedom			
Michigan	Maya Schuhknecht	21	Buchanan	Speed Painting	Art for All		Preliminary Talent	
Minnesota	Angelina Amerigo	22	Mound	Dance	One Bottle, One Straw, One Bag at a Time			
Mississippi	Vivian O'Neal	25	Hattiesburg	Dance	CapABLE		Preliminary Fitness	
Missouri	Hayley Leach	25	St.Louis	HERstory	Autism Awareness and Acceptance-See the Able, not the Label.			
Montana	Faith Johnson	23	Helena	Vocal	Connecting Hearts Through the Arts			Previously Miss Montana's Outstanding Teen 2016
Nebraska	Morgan Baird	21	Gering	Contemporary Dance	Rock the Vote: Building the Political Power of Young People			
Nevada	Taylor Blatchford	24	Boulder City	Violin	Text 2 Regret			Previously Distinguished Young Woman of Nevada 2018
New Hampshire	Brooke Mills	24	Concord	Vocal	Lessen the Impact: Concussion Awareness			Daughter of Miss New Hampshire 1995
New Jersey	Victoria Mozitis	22	Northfield	Musical Theater Vocal	Literacy Enhancement			
New Mexico	Lianna Hartshorn	19	Las Cruces	Vocal	How to Start a Healthy Heart-The Miss Initiative			
New York	Amelia Collins	21	Manhattan	Dance	POW-HER: Promoting Women's Healthcare as an Entitled Right	Top 11		Former Miss Tennessee Volunteer; 3rd runner-up at Miss Volunteer America 2022
North Carolina	Taylor Loyd	22	Mooresville	Operatic Vocal	The Arts Connection	Top 11	Preliminary Talent	
North Dakota	Sydney Helgeson	22	Bismarck	Vocal	Live United: Building Stronger Communities Together			Previously Miss North Dakota's Outstanding Teen 2017
Ohio	Madison Miller	23	Coshocton	Piano	The Veteran Narrative			
Oklahoma	Sunny Day	28	Norman	Vocal "My Man"	Ready S.E.T. Go: Skills Beyond the Classroom			
Oregon	Allison Burke	27	Tigard	Violin	Food Security for All			
Pennsylvania	Miranda Moore	24	Harrisburg	Clarinet	Take Action in Fashion			
Rhode Island	Caroline Parente	21	South Kingstown	Vocal	InvestHer: Igniting the Power of the Female Entrepreneur	Fourth Runner-up		Previously Miss Rhode Island's Outstanding Teen 2019
South Carolina	Jada Samuel	26	Greenville	HERstory	iShapeMe Inc.			
South Dakota	Miranda Orth O'Bryan	25	Martin	Vocal	Page Turners: Fall in Love with Reading			
Tennessee	Brandee Mills	25	Nashville	Dance	Unashamed — Living Mindfully of Mental Health		Preliminary Fitness	
Texas	Ellie Breaux	22	Houston	Rhythmic Gymnastics/Dance	Cops in the Communities	First Runner-up	Preliminary Evening Gown	
Utah	Sarah Sun	22	Salt Lake City	Classical Piano	Changed for Good: Reducing Recidivism, Strengthening Communities			Previously Distinguished Young Woman of Utah 2019; Second runner-up at Distinguished Young Women Nationals Competition
Vermont	Yamuna Turco	20	Colchester	Vocal	One Book, One Child			
Virginia	Katie Rose	27	Martinsburg	Ballet en Pointe	Ending Domestic Violence by Empowering Women and Enabling Reform			
Washington	Vanessa Munson	21	Battle Ground	Jazz Dance	Beauty and Beyond: What is your Beautiful?			Serves Active Duty in the United States Army
West Virginia	Karrington Childress	21	Charles Town	HERstory	Readers are Leaders			
Wisconsin	Lila Hui Szyryj	22	Madison	Classical piano, "Revolutionary Etude" by Frederic Chopin	Breaking Down Breaking News			Fifth Asian-American and first Chinese-American to win Miss Wisconsin
Wyoming	Mackenzie Kern	23	Casper	HERstory				Former Miss Wyoming USA 2021 and Miss Wyoming Teen USA 2018
