= Abbie Stockard =

Miss America 2025 (born 2002)

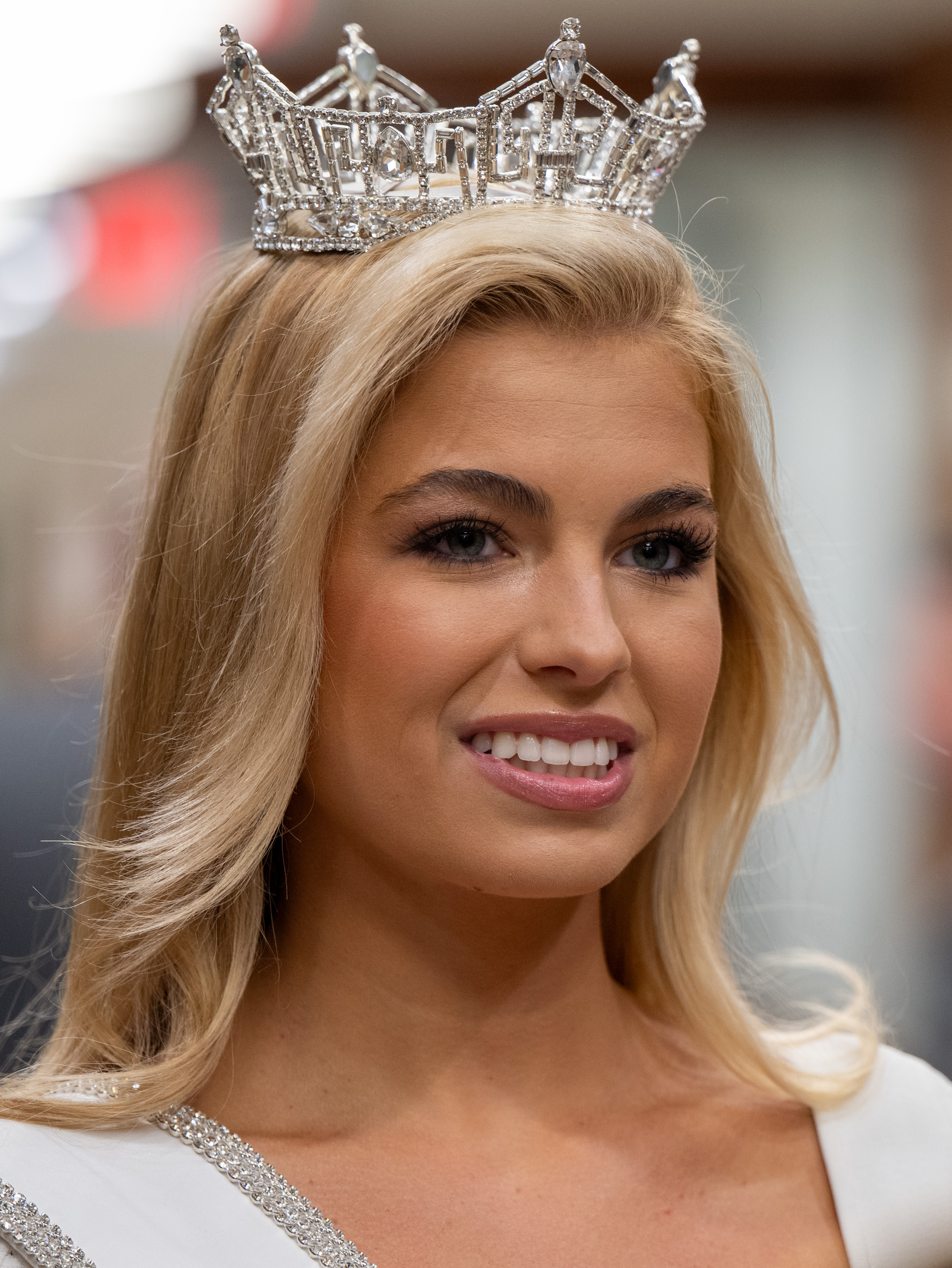
- Stockard at the White House in 2025
- Born: July 26, 2002 (age 24); Birmingham, Alabama, U.S.
- Education: Auburn University
- Known for: Miss America 2025
- Title: Miss Hoover 2024; Miss Alabama 2024; Miss America 2025
- Term: January 5, 2025 – September 7, 2025
- Predecessor: Madison Marsh
- Successor: Cassie Donegan
- Partner(s): Walker Kessler (2024–present; engaged)

Abbie Stockard (born July 26, 2002) is an American beauty pageant titleholder who was crowned Miss America 2025. Stockard was previously crowned Miss Alabama 2024, making her the fourth woman from Alabama to be crowned Miss America.

== Early life and education ==
Stockard was born in Birmingham, Alabama, to parents Brad and Kim Stockard, and has two siblings, twin brother Bradley and younger sister Lilly. Stockard attended Vestavia Hills High School in Vestavia Hills, Alabama, graduating in 2021.

Prior to winning Miss America, Stockard was a senior at Auburn University in Auburn, Alabama, as a nursing major, a member of Alpha Gamma Delta, and a former member of the Tiger Paws dance team. She is planning to obtain a doctorate in nurse anesthesia, and specialize in pediatric medicine.

== Pageantry ==
Stockard was named Miss Hoover 2024, qualifying her for the Miss Alabama 2024 pageant which she won on June 29, 2024.

=== Miss America 2025 ===
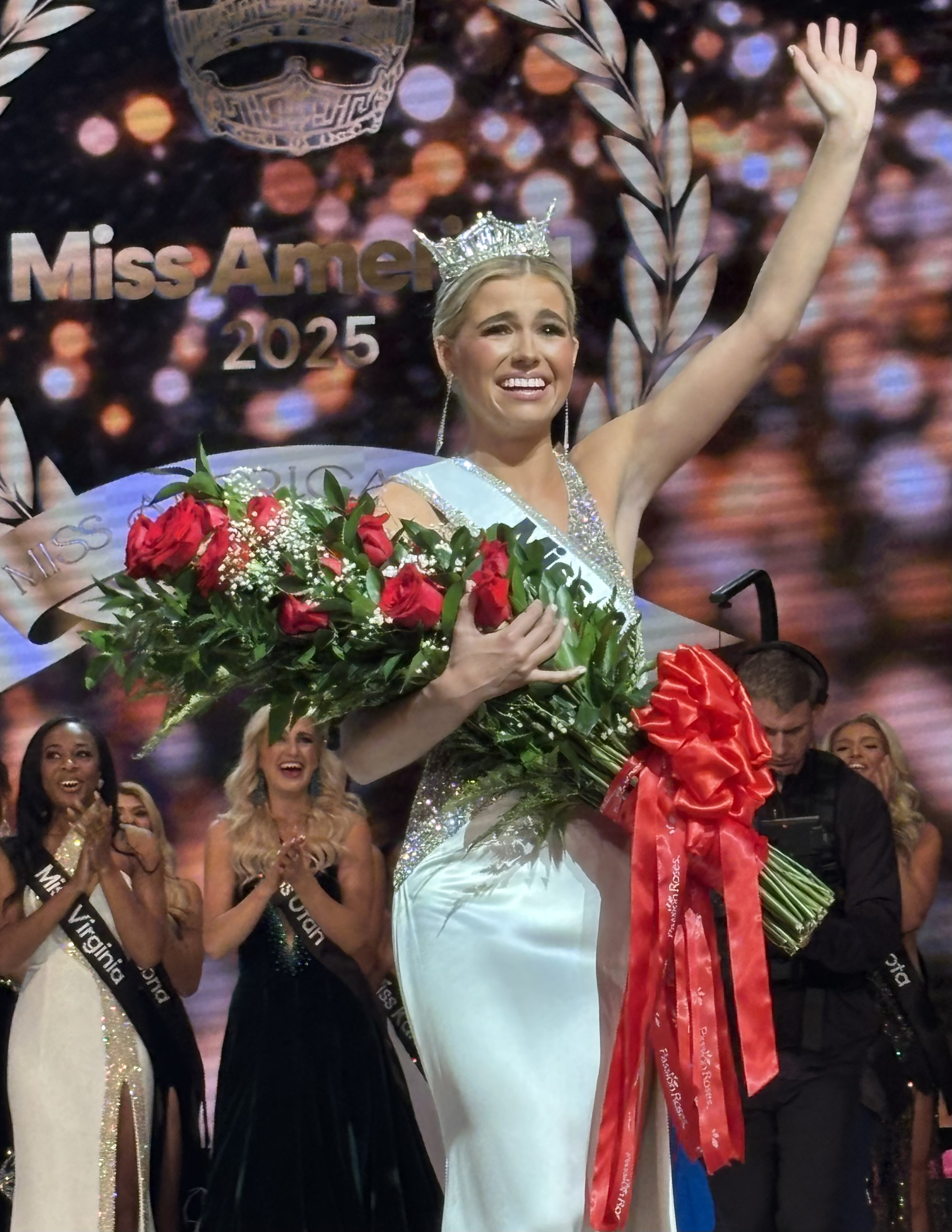
Stockard after winning Miss America 2025

As Miss Alabama 2024, Stockard was selected to represent Alabama at the Miss America 2025 pageant. Miss America 2025 was held at the Dr. Phillips Center for the Performing Arts in Orlando, Florida, on January 5, 2025.

In the pageant, Stockard advanced into the top eleven and later the top five, ultimately being crowned the winner. As Miss America 2025, Stockard became the fourth woman representing Alabama to win the pageant.

As part of her prize package, Stockard received a $50,000 scholarship to further her education. She will spend her year as Miss America focusing on children's health initiatives and will serve as the official ambassador of the National Cystic Fibrosis Foundation.

== Personal life ==
Stockard is engaged to NBA player Walker Kessler.

Awards and achievements
Preceded by Madison Marsh (Colorado)	Miss America; 2025	Succeeded by Cassie Donegan (New York)
Preceded by Brianna Burrell	Miss Alabama; 2024	Vacant Title next held by Emma Terry
