= Madison Marsh =

Miss America 2024 and U.S. Air Force officer (born 2001)

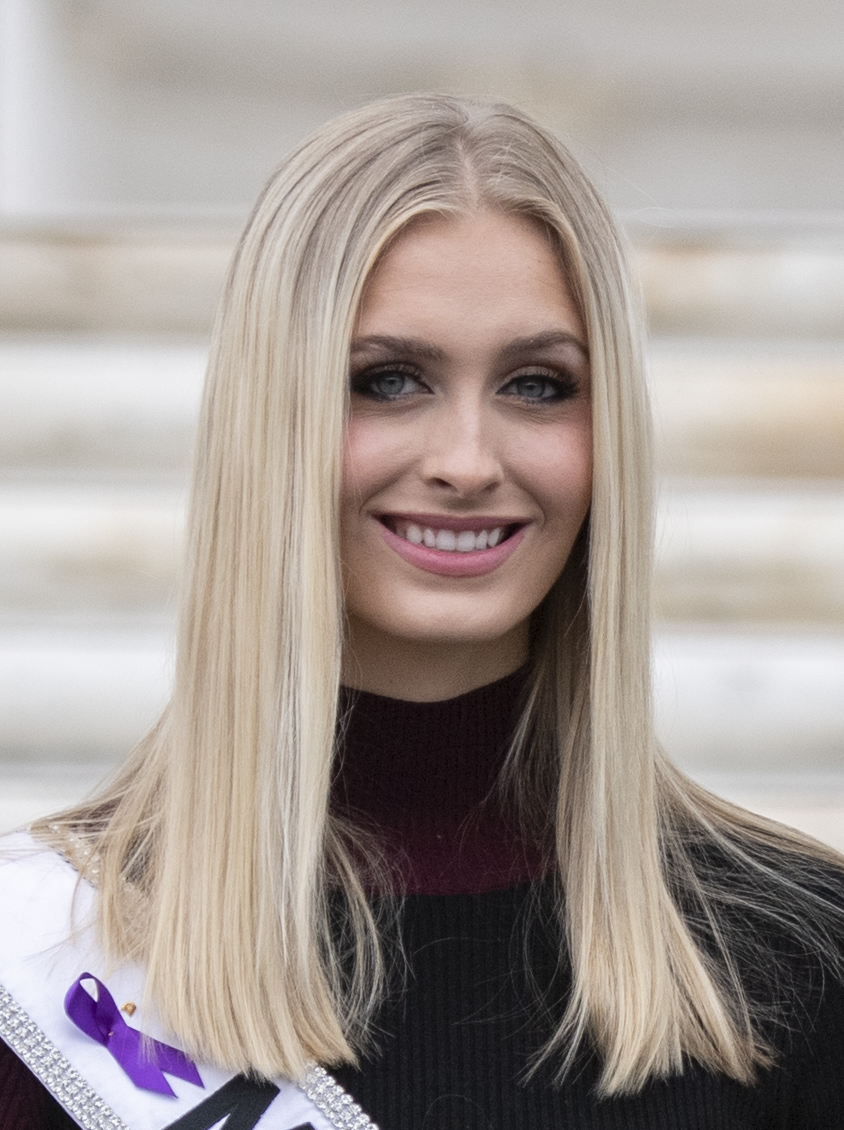
- Marsh in 2024
- Born: Madison Isabella Marsh; August 2, 2001 (age 25); Fort Smith, Arkansas, U.S.
- Education: United States Air Force Academy (BS); Harvard Kennedy School
- Known for: Miss America 2024
- Title: Miss Academy 2023; Miss Colorado 2023; Miss America 2024
- Term: January 14, 2024 – January 5, 2025
- Predecessor: Grace Stanke
- Successor: Abbie Stockard
- Military career
- Allegiance: United States
- Branch: United States Air Force
- Service years: 2023–present
- Rank: Second lieutenant

Madison Isabella Marsh (born August 2, 2001) is an American beauty pageant titleholder who won Miss America 2024. She had previously been crowned Miss Colorado 2023, and was both the fourth woman representing Colorado and the first member of the United States Armed Forces to win the title of Miss America.

== Early life and education ==
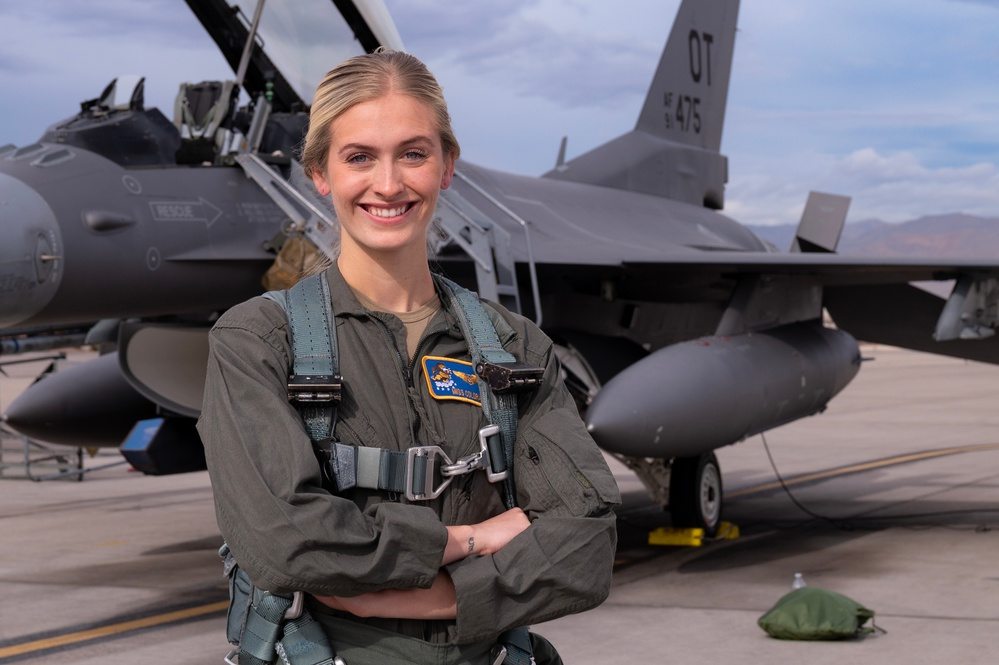
2nd Lt. Madison Marsh in December 2023

Marsh was born in Fort Smith, Arkansas to Mike and Whitney Marsh, and has four siblings. Her father is a physician and her mother was a Court Appointed Special Advocate (CASA). Her mother died of pancreatic cancer when Marsh was seventeen years old, leading Marsh to become an activist for pancreatic cancer awareness and prevention. She founded the Whitney Marsh Foundation in her mother's honor in 2019, which raises funds for cancer research.

Marsh graduated from Southside High School in Fort Smith, Arkansas in 2019. While growing up, she enjoyed space camps and flying lessons, receiving her pilot's license at age 17. After graduating high school, she attended the United States Air Force Academy in Colorado Springs, Colorado, and graduated with a degree in astrophysics in 2023. Upon graduation, Marsh was commissioned a second lieutenant in the United States Air Force. Marsh subsequently studied public policy for one semester at the Harvard Kennedy School through the Air Force Civilian Institution program. She afterwards interned with Harvard's medical department.

== Pageantry ==
In 2023, Marsh was crowned Miss Academy 2023, a pageant for women attending the United States Air Force Academy. As Miss Academy 2023, she was eligible for the Miss Colorado 2023 pageant, which she went on to win in May 2023. This was her third attempt at competing for the Miss Colorado title. As Miss Colorado 2023, Marsh became the first Miss America contestant to be an active-duty military officer.

=== Miss America 2024 ===
As Miss Colorado 2023, Marsh was selected to represent Colorado at the Miss America 2024 pageant. Miss America 2024 was held at the Dr. Phillips Center for the Performing Arts in Orlando, Florida on January 14, 2024. In the pageant, Marsh advanced into the Top 11 and later the Top 5, ultimately being crowned the winner, besting first runner-up Ellie Breaux of Texas. As Miss America 2024, Marsh became the fourth woman representing Colorado to win the pageant, and the first member of the United States Armed Forces to be crowned the winner. As part of her prize package, Marsh received a $50,000 scholarship to further her education. Marsh has received over $70,000 total in scholarships from competing within the Miss America organization. During her reign as Miss America, Marsh is serving in an Air Force public affairs and recruiting position.

Marsh was the honorary pace car driver at the 2024 Daytona 500 NASCAR race. In February 2024, Marsh received the 'Spirit of the Springs' Award from the city of Colorado Springs. She visited students at schools in Colorado Springs, Colorado, and Daytona Beach, Florida. Marsh also visited Fort Knox, and Ebbing Air National Guard Base. She presented a wreath at the Tomb of the Unknown Soldier (Unknowns) at Arlington National Cemetery, and visited the Memorial Display Room on March 3, 2024. Madison was a special guest of the Royal International Air Tattoo in England in July 2024, and spoke about her USAF career mixed with being Miss America in front of 100,000 visitors from all over the world.

== Career after Miss America ==
After her Miss America reign, Marsh continues as an Air Force officer and as a graduate student at Harvard University (as of 2025). In April 2025, she gave a keynote at Harvard Kennedy School's Institute of Politics.

== Personal life ==
Marsh has a black belt in taekwondo. In January 2024, Marsh announced her engagement to Walker Morris; this was in sharp contrast to the Miss America pageant's previous strict "no-boyfriend" rules.

Marsh's cousin is Madeline Bohlman, a beauty pageant titleholder who was crowned Miss Arkansas Teen USA in 2021 and Miss Arkansas USA in 2024.

Awards and achievements
| Preceded by Grace Stanke (Wisconsin) | Miss America; 2024 | Succeeded by Abbie Stockard (Alabama) |
| Preceded by Savannah Cavanaugh | Miss Colorado; 2023 | Succeeded by Sarah Jean Swift |
