= Cassie Donegan =

Miss America 2026

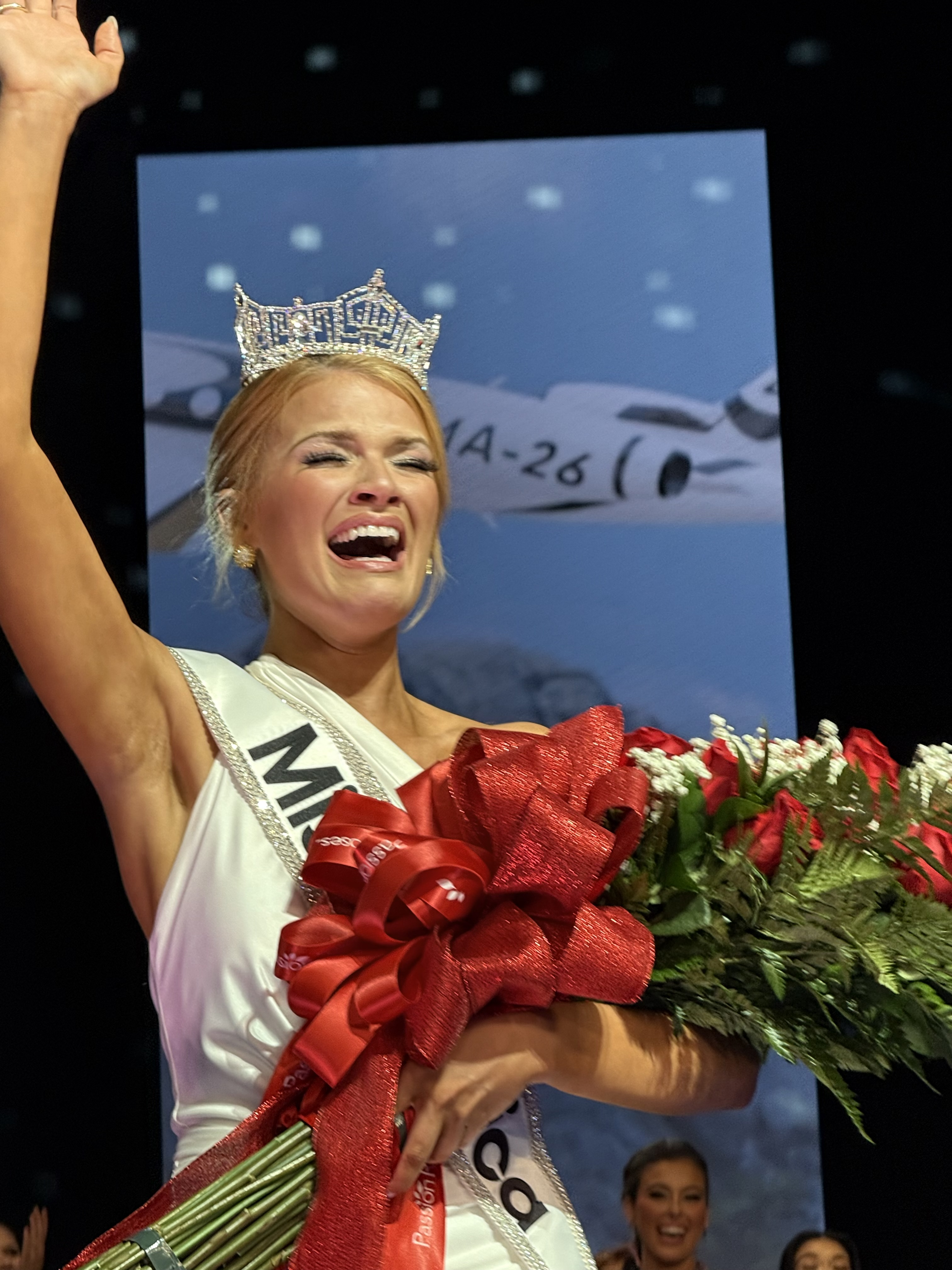
- Born: Cassandra Donegan; September 5, 1997 (age 29); Smithfield, Virginia, U.S.
- Education: Belmont University
- Known for: Miss America 2026
- Title: Miss Greater Springfield's Outstanding Teen 2013; Miss Virginia's Outstanding Teen 2013; Miss New York Volunteer 2024; Miss Five Boroughs 2025; Miss New York 2025 (Note: Donegan originally placed as the first runner-up, but became Miss New York when the original winner Mina Liang resigned.); Miss America 2026
- Term: September 7, 2025 – September 6, 2026
- Predecessor: Abbie Stockard
- Successor: Regan Hutsell

Cassandra "Cassie" Donegan (born September 5, 1997) is an American beauty pageant titleholder who was crowned Miss America 2026. Donegan was previously crowned Miss New York 2025, making her the eighth woman from New York to be crowned Miss America.

== Early life ==
Donegan was born and raised in Smithfield, Virginia, in the Hampton Roads region of the state. As an adolescent, she was active in local theater in her hometown, performing in plays and musicals while a student at the York County School of the Arts and Bethel Christian School in Hampton, Virginia. She ultimately graduated from high school in 2015, and afterwards moved to Nashville, Tennessee to study musical theater at Belmont University. Donegan later relocated to New York City.

Prior to becoming Miss America, Donegan worked as the chief operating officer (COO) for the childcare booking company Southern Sitters, while also performing as an actress and singer.

== Pageantry ==
Donegan had been competing in pageantry since she was nine years old and won her first major pageant title after being crowned Miss Virginia's Outstanding Teen 2013, qualifying for the state pageant as Miss Greater Springfield's Outstanding Teen 2013. As the Virginia state titleholder, Donegan went on to compete at Miss America's Outstanding Teen 2014, where she finished as the fourth runner-up. She later returned to pageantry as an adult, winning the title of Miss New York Volunteer 2024, and placing second runner-up to Miss Volunteer America.

=== Miss America 2026 ===
In January 2025, Donegan won the Miss Five Boroughs 2025 pageant in New York City, which qualified her to compete for the Miss New York 2025 title. The pageant was held on July 19, where Donegan went on to finish as the first runner-up to the original winner Mina Liang. Days after winning the title, Liang resigned and Donegan succeeded her as the new Miss New York 2025.

As Miss New York 2025, Donegan competed at the Miss America 2026 pageant held in September 2025 in Orlando, Florida. Ahead of the competition, she adopted "Promoting Arts Education in Our School Systems" as her advocacy platform, which supported arts education in schools. During the pageant, Donegan advanced from the initial pool of 52 contestants into the top 11, and for the talent competition performed the song "A Darker Shade of Blue" from the musical Some Like It Hot, for which she was named one of the three talent competition winners. She ultimately advanced into the top five and was later declared the winner of the competition, becoming the eighth woman representing New York to become Miss America. As Miss America, Donegan received a $50,000 scholarship, which she planned to use to fund her undergraduate education and pursue a master's degree.

== Notes ==
Awards and achievements
| Preceded by Abbie Stockard | Miss America; 2026 | Succeeded by Regan Hutsell |
| Preceded by Mina Liang (Resigned) | Miss New York; 2025 | Succeeded by Lauren Norris |
| Preceded by Alexys Conti | Miss New York Volunteer; 2024 | Succeeded by Claudia Engelhardt |
| Preceded by Andolyn Medina | Miss Virginia's Outstanding Teen; 2013 | Succeeded by Casey Shepard |
