= Palm Beach County Convention Center =

Convention center in Florida, United States

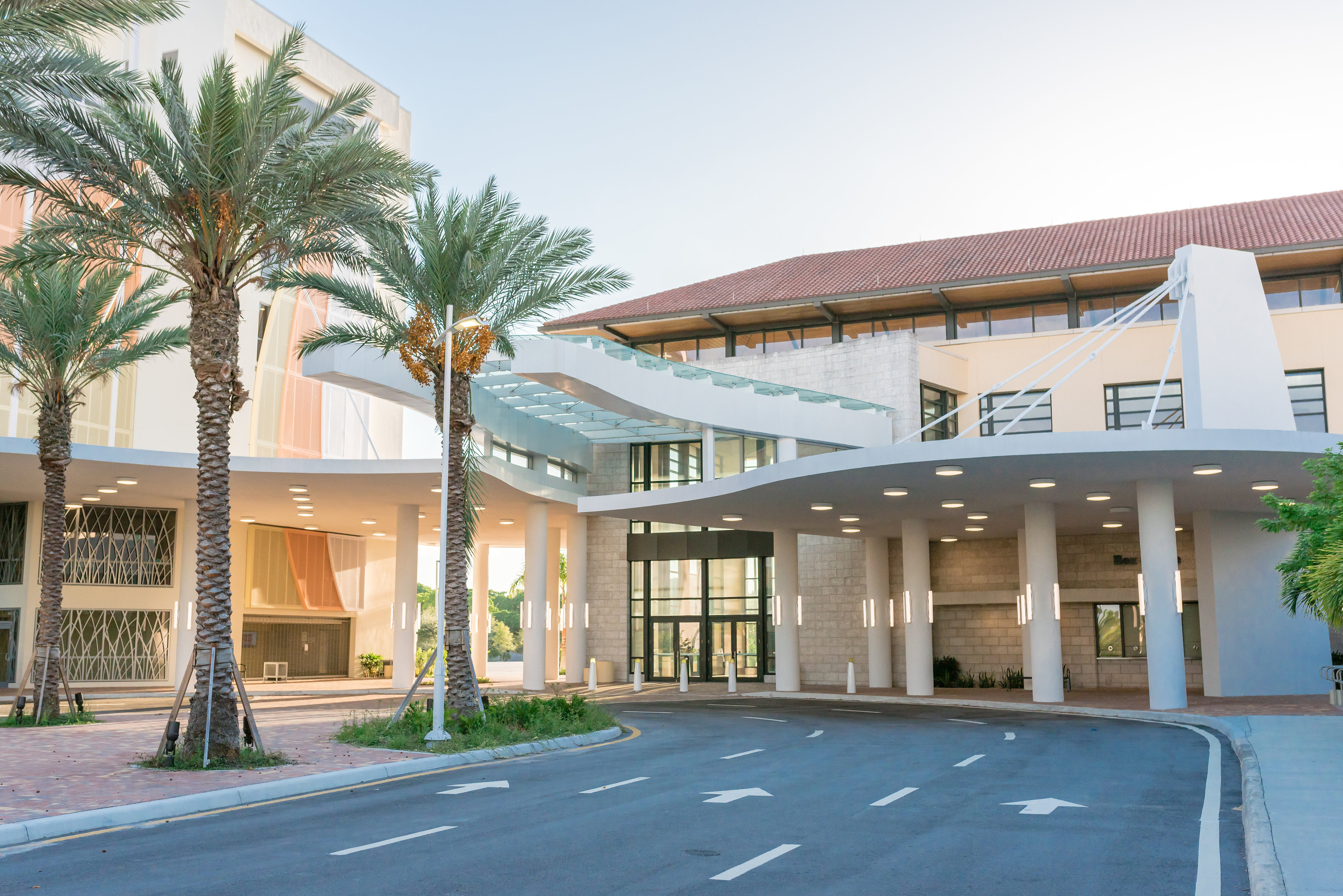
- Interactive map of Palm Beach County Convention Center
- Address: 650 Okeechobee Boulevard
- Location: West Palm Beach, Florida
- Coordinates: 26.70478°N 80.05896°W
- Capacity: Detailed venue capacity: Ballroom: 2,070; Exhibit Hall: 6,808

Construction
- Opened: January 2004
- Cost: $83-million

Website
- Official website

The Palm Beach County Convention Center is a multi-purpose facility in West Palm Beach, Florida, managed by the venue company Oak View Group 360 (OVG360) and catering company OVG Hospitality. The facility opened in January 2004 and hosts many high profile events, such as the Food and Wine Festival and various guest speakers It is connected via covered walkway to the Hilton West Palm Beach hotel, and is located across the street from The Square, an upscale shopping district with nightlife, restaurants and shopping.

== See also ==
- List of convention centers in the United States
