= MidCity District =

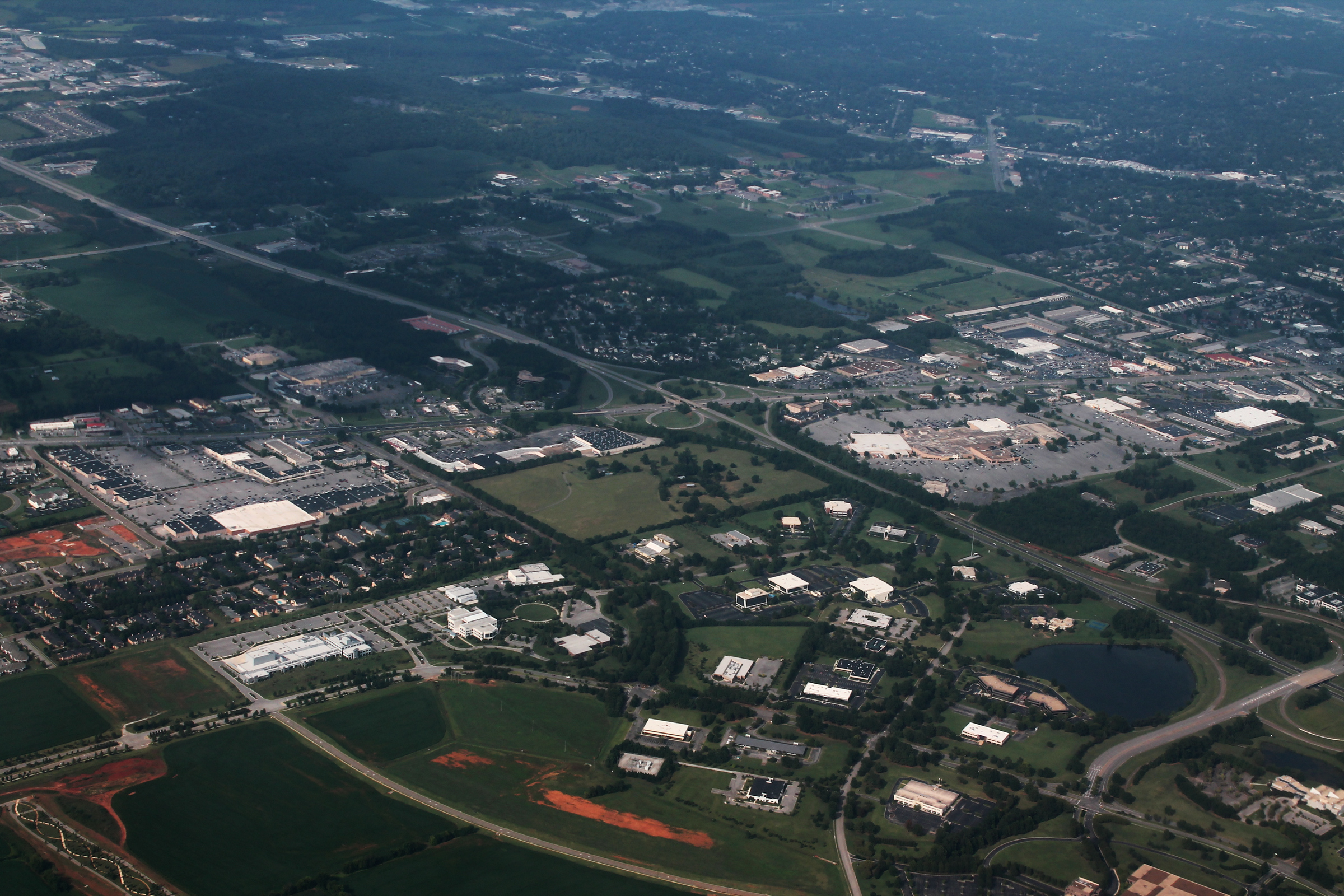
- Aerial view
- Coordinates: 34.738°N 86.666°W
- Address: 5901 University Dr NW, Huntsville, AL 35806
- Opened: August 1, 1984 (Madison Square Mall)
- Closed: January 29, 2017 (Madison Square Mall)
- Developer: RCP Companies
- Num. of stores: 120 (at its peak in 2011)
- Num. of anchor tenants: 5
- Floors: 2
- Website: http://www.midcitydistrict.com

MidCity District (formerly known as MidCity Huntsville for a brief period of time) is a mixed-use retail development center currently being built in Huntsville, Alabama on the corner of University Drive (US 72) and Research Park Boulevard (SR-255) on the land formerly used for Madison Square Mall. Madison Square Mall was the largest mall in the city; it encompassed over 929,993 sq ft (86,399.2 m^{2}). It was also the oldest extant enclosed shopping mall (after the Heart of Huntsville Mall closed) in the city until its closure in 2017. It is expected to be completed in 2032. MidCity's first official phase opened with Topgolf and a preview center/entertainment venue called The Camp at MidCity.

== Timeline ==
=== 1984 ===
Madison Square Mall logo

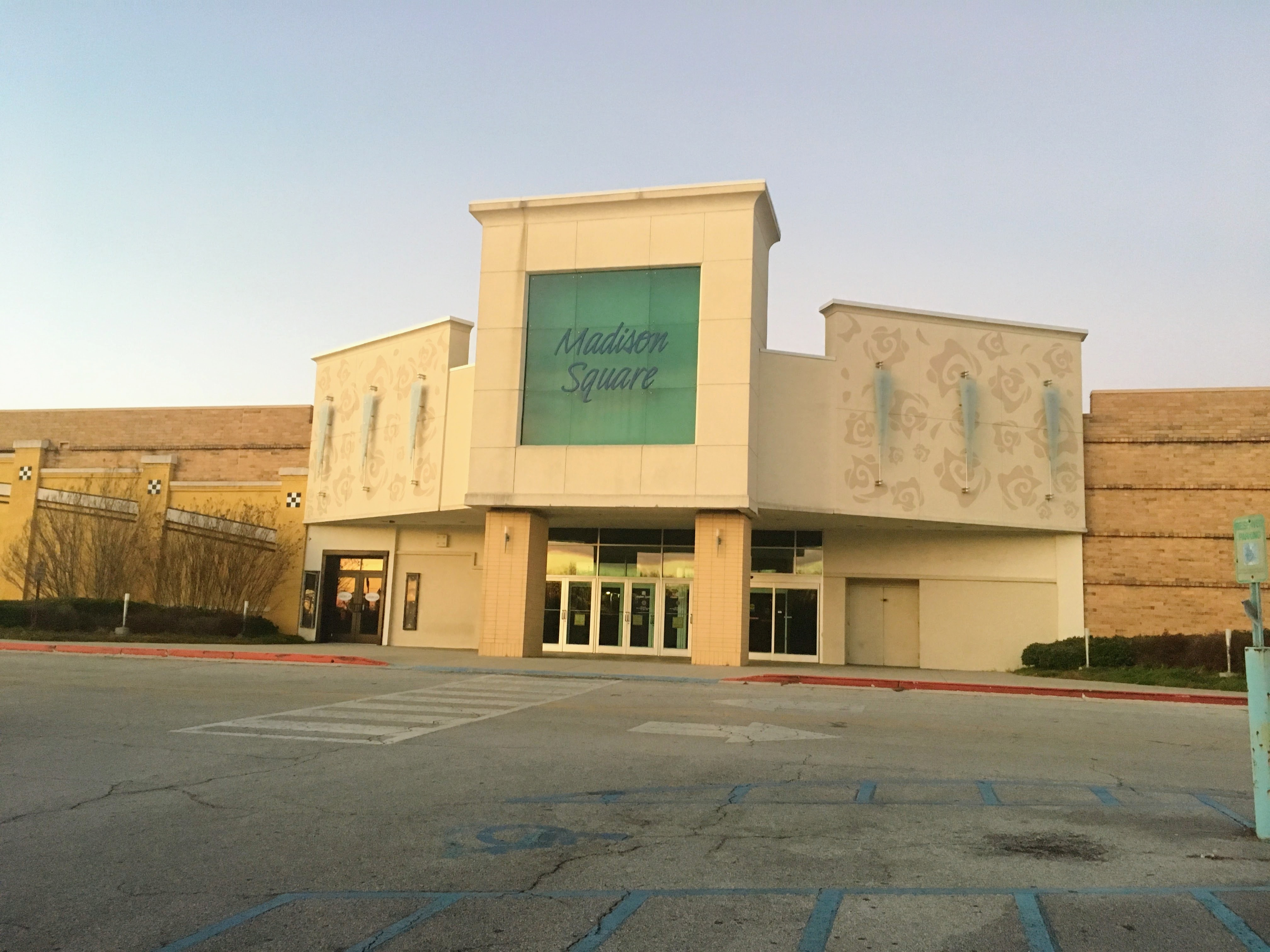
Madison Square Mall food court entrance

Madison Square Mall opened on August 1, 1984, with anchors JCPenney, Parisian, Castner Knott, Pizitz, and a Sears which relocated from Heart of Huntsville Mall. Junior anchors included Yielding and Blach's. The opening day ceremonies were attended by the Miss America 1984 contestant, Suzette Charles, in her first public appearance as the successor to Vanessa Williams after she was forced to resign the title due to unauthorized publication of nude photographs.

=== Growth ===
Over time, some of the anchors moved or were bought out by bigger companies. Blach's was closed by 1987 and replaced by The Limited and Victoria's Secret. Pizitz was acquired by Jackson, Mississippi–based McRae's in 1988 and renamed as such until McRae's was acquired by Charlotte, North Carolina–based Belk. Castner Knott was acquired in 1998 by Dillard's. Yielding closed their Madison Square Mall location around 1993.

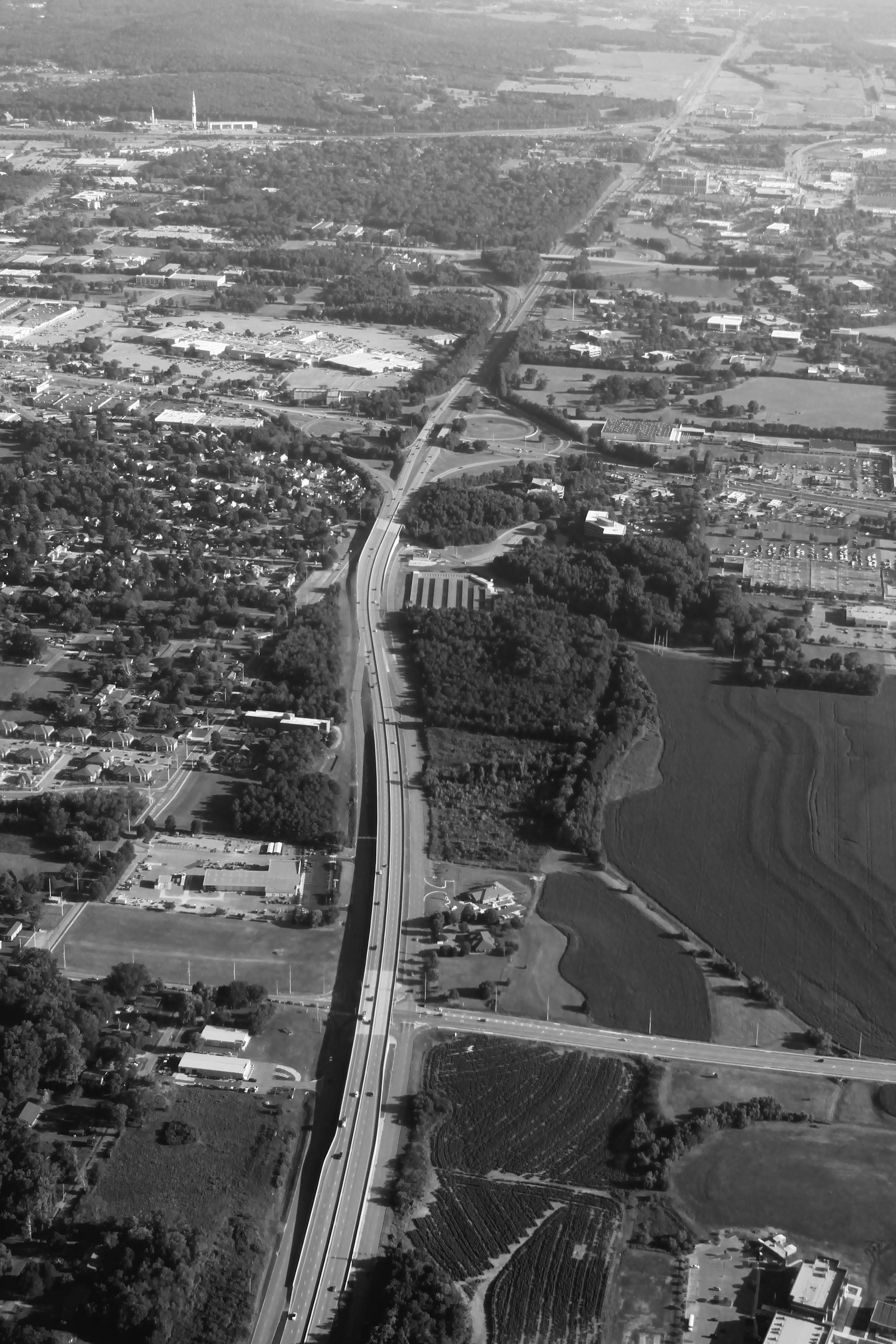

For the next 10 years, the space was used by Castner Knott/Dillard's for their menswear. Until 2008, Steve & Barry's used the space. In 2007, Belk, after purchasing Parisian, moved its store from the former McRae's space to the much larger former Parisian space and renovated it to fit the Belk model. The former McRae's building remained vacant from then until the mall closed. Belk departed for Bridge Street Town Center in late 2014.

In addition to the in-line mall stores, several other businesses are located in the Madison Square complex, including a Holiday Inn hotel, a Steak 'n Shake restaurant, and a TouchStar Cinemas movie theater. Former businesses in the complex include Romano's Macaroni Grill and Lone Star Steakhouse & Saloon.

Madison Square Mall had been renovated twice since its opening, first in 1994 and again in 2006. It had 120 stores at its peak in 2011.

=== Decline ===
In the years following the renovation of 2006, a decrease in foot traffic and an increased crime threat led to many tenants of the mall relocating to other locations. A riot erupted in December 2012 over the new Nike Air Jordan; police had to use pepper spray to calm the situation. No arrests were made. In July 2014, a video surfaced online of a Belk employee attempting to fight off a shoplifter in the parking lot. In September 2015, a woman was robbed at gunpoint in the parking lot of the mall.

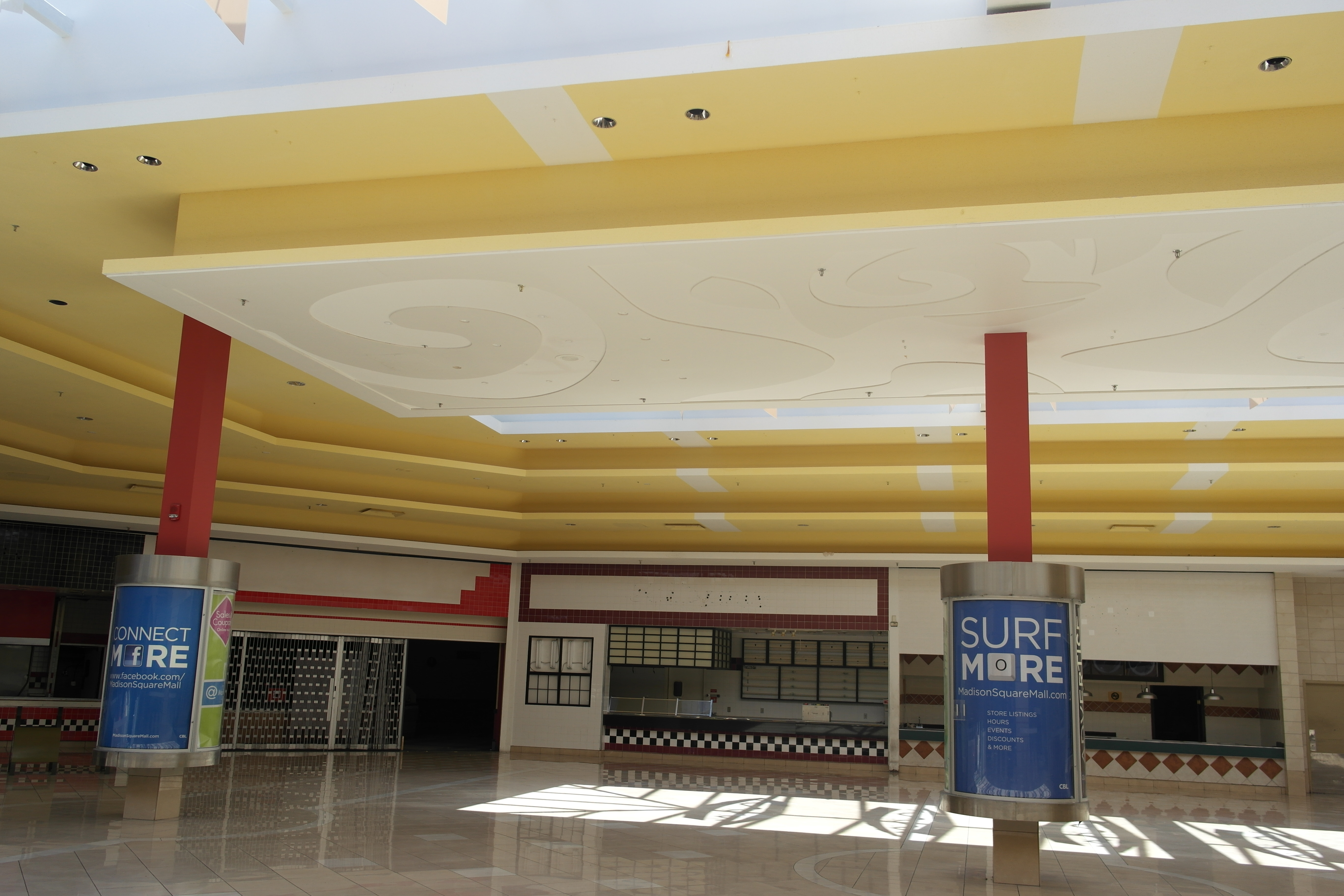
Madison Square Mall's food court empty in 2016

The pilot episode of the Food Network show, Food Court Wars was filmed at this mall. Kettle N' Spouts, the winner of the episode, received a year's worth of free rent in the mall that was valued at $100,000. Kettle N' Spouts closed only 6 months after the episode aired.

Madison Square Mall was owned by CBL & Associates Properties, Inc., until it was sold to The Grove Huntsville LLC for $5 million in late April 2015. The new owners intended to redevelop the property, despite struggles with the city of Huntsville against property owners Sears, JCPenney, and most notably TouchStar Cinemas, who started a petition on June 7, 2016, to prevent their property from being demolished. Not even 24 hours later, the petition achieved over 1,000 signatures. Huntsville's Director of Urban Development, Shane Davis, made a statement regarding this move, and confirmed that the theater would not be demolished, and instead the plans would be reworked around the property.

Madison Square Mall began liquidation in summer 2016. The last liquidation sale ended on January 8, 2017.

On November 28, 2016, Sears announced it would be closing on January 29, 2017, making it the last tenant or anchor to close in the mall. Sears also announced it would return to the MidCity Huntsville development that will replace Madison Square Mall in a smaller store. In December 2016, JCPenney announced it would close on January 28, 2017. JCPenney exited the Huntsville area in 2016.

=== 2017 ===
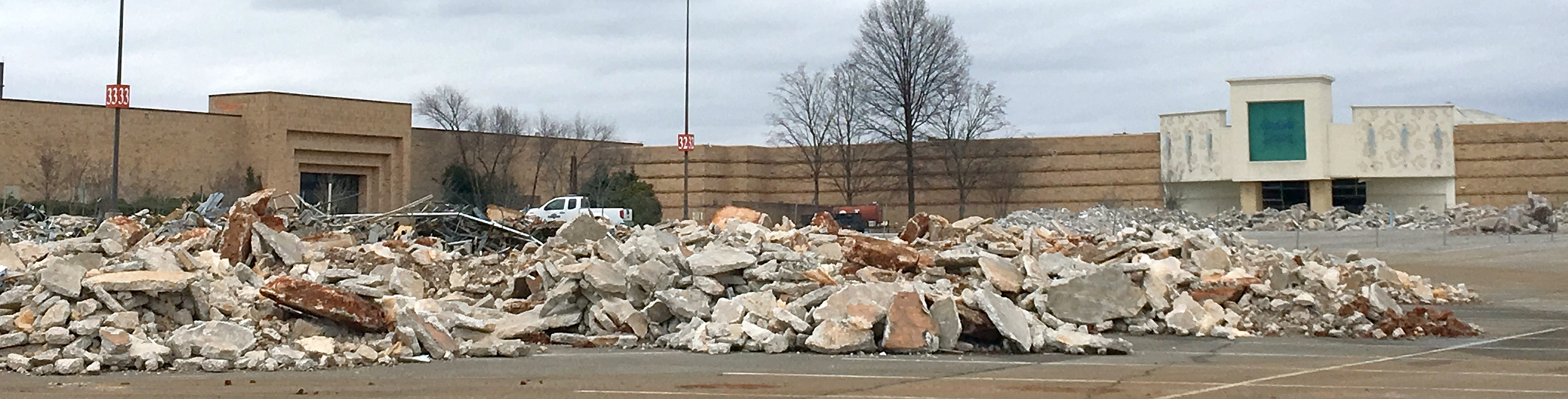
Madison Square Mall, February 2017

With the closure of Sears and JCPenney, Madison Square Mall permanently closed on January 29, 2017. Demolition of the former mall began on February 6, 2017.

Demolition lasted several months, concluding sometime in June. As demolition began to slow down, construction of Topgolf began in April. National Real Estate Investor listed MidCity as one of the 12 largest retail developments underway slated for delivery in 2017 or 2018. In June, it was announced that High Point Climbing and Fitness would be coming to Midcity Huntsville, with construction beginning sometime in the fall. A smaller project, The Camp at Midcity, which is a small music and arts venue, was developed on the former Lone Star Grill property. It opened on August 9. Topgolf opened December 22, 2017.

=== 2018 ===
In February 2018, it was announced that Dave & Buster's would be opening in July 2019. There was also the announcement of a Wahlburgers opening sometime in the future as well. In March 2018, it was announced that RCP companies had brought in Mark Taft to plan multiple restaurants and eating locations throughout Midcity.

Sometime in late 2018, construction on High Point Climbing and Fitness began, as well as Dave and Buster's.

=== 2019 ===
On April 25, 2019, High Point Climbing and Fitness opened.

On April 30, 2019, the official name was changed from MidCity Huntsville to MidCity District.

On August 10, 2019, Dave & Buster's opened.

In November, REI Co-Op opened.

In December, it was announced that the Touchstar Cinemas Madison Square 12 would be replaced with a brand new venue, featuring the largest movie screen in Alabama. The new theater is scheduled to open in 2022.

=== 2020 ===
In January, it was announced that a Hotel Indigo would be developed on MidCity property, which is slated to feature 120 rooms and is planned for opening in mid-2021.

In February, RCP Companies announced two new food venues for the MidCity development. Kung Fu Tea, a bubble tea shop; and Kamado Ramen, an upscale traditional Ramen restaurant. Also announced was Color Me Mine, which will be an interactive art experience allowing customers to decorate their own ceramics.

In August, AL.com reported that local artist Logan Tanner will be creating a mural in dedication to the late Little Richard, which is set to appear on the Wahlburger's planned to open in the district.

=== 2021 ===
In March, MidCity District broke ground on its first multi-family project, Metronome Apartments.

In July, Huntsville awarded MidCity the honor of becoming its next entertainment "purple cup" district. Patrons will be able to walk the district with a "purple cup," allowing them to enjoy an alcoholic beverage outside establishments.

In August, MidCity welcomed a new mural - Unity is Love - by Ase Sela, located behind Kamado Ramen.

In September, Trader Joe's officially opened to the public.

In December, MidCity broke ground on its newest project, Blue Oak BBQ, an award-winning BBQ restaurant based out of New Orleans.

=== 2021 ===
The last remnant of the mall, Touchstar's Madison Square 12 theater, closed its doors permanently on May 2, 2021, and was demolished months afterwards.

=== 2022 ===
In February, artist Morgan Echols completed a colorful, geometric shipping container mural next to Kamado Ramen.

In May, the Orion Amphitheater held its Grand Opening and celebrated with the community with The First Waltz.

The Salt Factory Pub also opened in May.

=== 2023 ===
Notable business introduced to MidCity this year include TOUS les JOURS, Starbucks Coffee, and Tupelo Honey.
