= Sharlene Wells Hawkes =

Paraguayan-American author, singer and reporter

Sharlene Wells
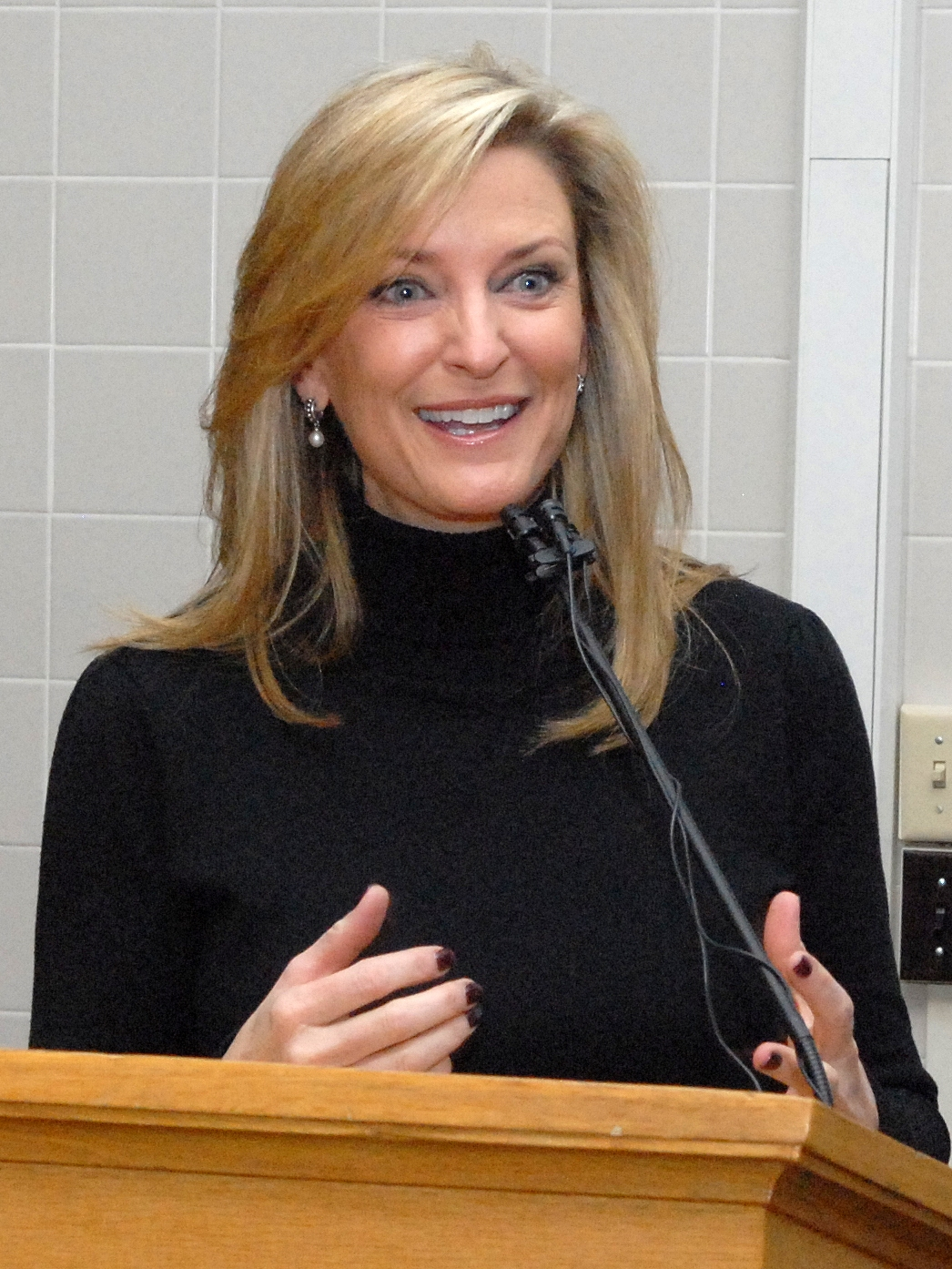
- Wells speaks to the Utah National Guard in 2009
- Born: Sharlene Wells; March 16, 1964 (age 62); Asunción, Paraguay
- Education: Brigham Young University University of Utah
- Occupations: Author; singer; reporter; beauty pageant titleholder
- Title: Miss Utah Valley 1984; Miss Utah 1984; Miss America 1985
- Predecessor: Suzette Charles
- Successor: Susan Akin
- Spouse: Bob Hawkes (m. 1987; div. 2018)
- Children: 4

Sharlene Wells (born March 16, 1964) is a Paraguayan-American author, singer, and reporter from Salt Lake City, Utah who was Miss America 1985. She worked with ESPN from 1987 to 2002 and was appointed by the U.S. Secretary of Defense to the Defense Advisory Committee on Women in the Armed Forces in 2015.

== Family and early life ==
Hawkes (née Wells), was born in Asunción, Paraguay and spent most of her childhood in Mexico, Chile and Ecuador. She was the first foreign-born, bilingual Miss America. She spent most of her teenaged years in Buenos Aires, Argentina. When she won the Miss America title, her parents were living in Holladay, Utah, a suburb of Salt Lake City. Being crowned Miss America was seen by some as an antidote to the scandal associated with the prior year's winner, Vanessa Williams. In 1985, Deseret Book published a biography of Wells, written by Sheri Dew.

Hawkes is a member of the Church of Jesus Christ of Latter-day Saints (LDS Church). She attended Brigham Young University (BYU), from which she graduated in 1988 with a bachelor's degree in communications.

== Miss America ==
The choice of Wells as Miss America was widely seen as a way to overcome the scandal connected with her predecessor, Vanessa Williams.

Wells publicly stated her support for the reelection of Ronald Reagan and her opposition to abortion, pre-marital sex, and the Equal Rights Amendment.

== Education and career ==
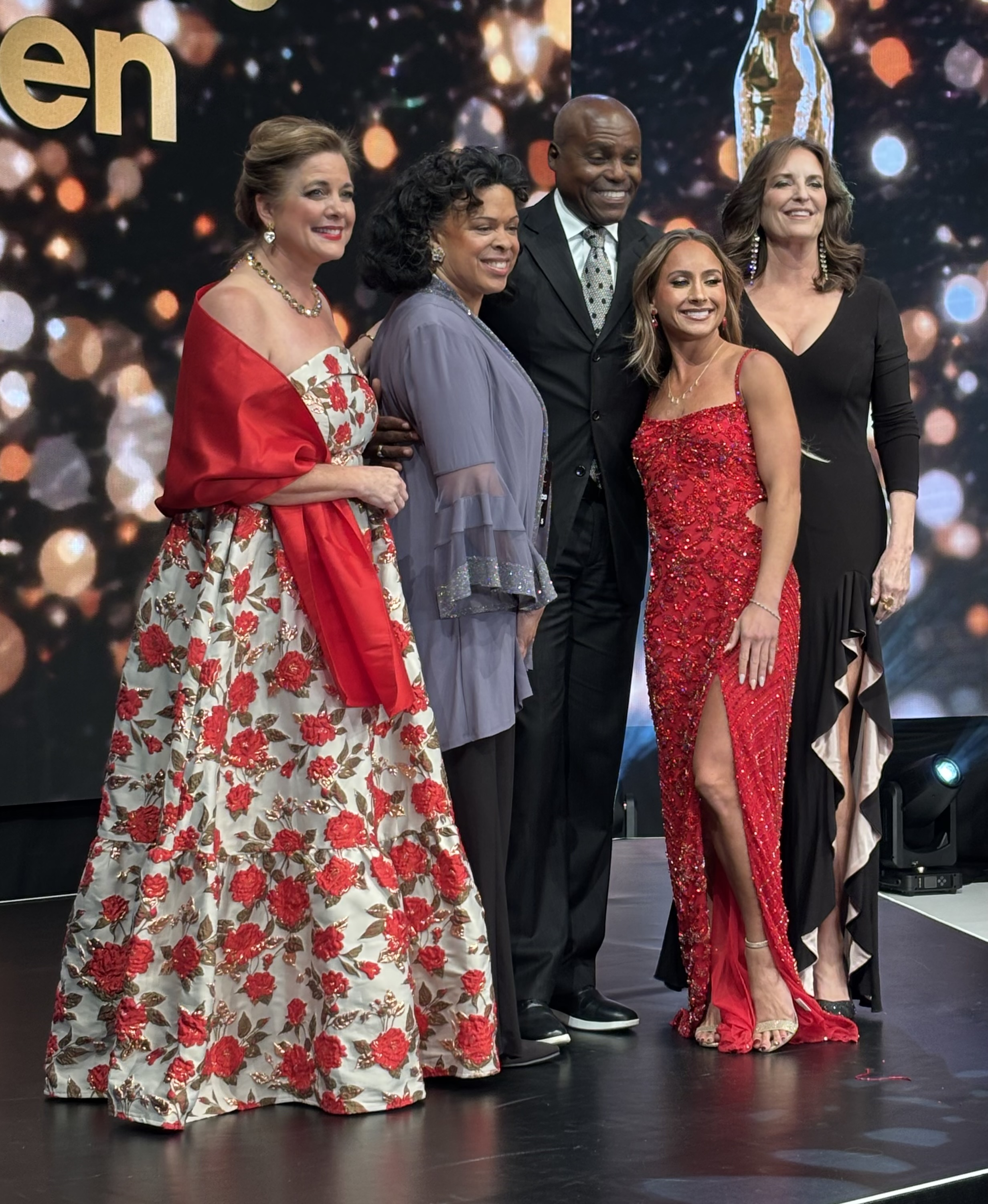
The judging panel for Miss America 2025 at the Walt Disney Theater in the Dr. Phillips Center for the Performing Arts in Orlando, Florida.

Hawkes is the author, or co-author, of several books. This includes a book written by Hawkes and Barbara Barrington Jones entitled The Inside Outside Beauty Book (1989), Living in but not of The World (1997), and Kissing a Frog: Four Steps to Finding Comfort Outside Your Comfort Zone. She is also a singer and has released albums called When We Will All Believe (1994) and Songs of the Morning Stars (1996).

Hawkes holds a master's degree in integrated marketing communications from the University of Utah.

Hawkes was a horse racing and college football reporter with ESPN from 1987 to 2002.

Since 2007, Hawkes has worked to help veterans and their families. This includes a program to bring wives and daughters of veterans killed in the line of duty to the Miss America pageant.

In 2015 Hawkes was appointed by the U.S. Secretary of Defense to the Defense Advisory Committee on Women in the Armed Forces.

As of August 2016, Hawkes is serving as executive vice president of Story Rock Electronic Publishing, and as president of its military division, Remember My Service, producing historical records for military personnel.

Hawkes served as a judge for the Miss America 2017 and Miss America 2025 competitions.

== Sources ==
- Knight-Ridder newspapers article on Wells
- BYU Magazine article on Hawkes
- Sep. 17, 1984 UPI article on Wells
- Ensign Nov. 1984 article on Wells
- Sun-Sentinel article on Wells
- Haws, J. B. The Mormon Image in the American Mind. New York: Oxford University Press, 2013. p. 155.

Awards and achievements
Preceded by Suzette Charles	Miss America; 1985	Succeeded by Susan Akin
Preceded by Lynn Lambert	Miss Utah; 1984	Succeeded by Nancy Ayers
