= Heart of Huntsville Mall =

Former shopping mall in Huntsville, Alabama

- Location: Huntsville, Alabama, United States
- Coordinates: 34.724°N 86.594°W
- Opened: 1961
- Closed: 2007 (demolished September 2007)

The Heart of Huntsville Mall was a shopping mall located in Huntsville, Alabama, United States. It opened in 1961. The mall was demolished in 2007 to make way for a new $150 million mixed-use development consisting of an apartment complex called the "Constellation" and other local businesses.

== History ==
The Heart of Huntsville Mall was the first enclosed shopping mall in Huntsville when it opened in 1961. The 250,000 sq ft (23,000 m^{2}) single-story complex was built just outside downtown at the intersection of Clinton Avenue and Memorial Parkway. Its major tenant was a 48,000 sq ft (4,500 m^{2}) Sears at the southern end of the mall.

Heart of Huntsville hosted many community events over the years, including several Scout Expos, craft fairs, and even punk rock shows in the mid-to-late 1990s. The long-running Delta Zeta Arts and Crafts Show began in 1967 with roughly 100 booths at Heart of Huntsville Mall.

The mall prospered for decades until the opening of Madison Square Mall in west Huntsville in 1984. Sears moved to Madison Square and, over time, other tenants would close as well. Woolworth's closed in 1992. As major chain stores closed, local businesses moved in to take advantage of lower rents.

In the late 1990s, the center was renamed "Market Square." The two anchor tenants were Burlington Coat Factory and Gold's Gym with various smaller tenants including a club called "721," an exercise equipment shop, and Ivey's Restaurant. In the early 2000s, the owner of the mall, Scott McLain, began plans to redevelop the center. He had recently completed a redevelopment of "The Mall," just north of Heart of Huntsville, into a power center with tenants such as Home Depot and Costco. By mid-2007, all but one of the tenants, a tanning salon, had moved out of the mall to make way for a $150 million mixed-use development called "Constellation."

== Future ==
By September 2007, all of the former Heart of Huntsville Mall was razed to make way for Constellation, a mixed-use 415,000 square feet (39,000 m^{2}) development that is projected to include retail, restaurants, two five-story, 160-room hotels (a Residence Inn by Marriott and a SpringHill Suites), 60,000 square feet (6,000 m^{2}) of office space, and a seven-story condo/apartment tower with up to 80 residential units. The complex will also include a multi-deck parking garage. The developer had initially suggested that restaurants on the site might include a Hard Rock Cafe or Cheesecake Factory, but in November 2007 he announced that these concepts were unsuitable for the market and other concepts were being researched. In January 2008, Huntsville City Council president Glenn Watson suggested that the site might also be a good home for a new City Hall.

Site construction on the project began in the Spring of 2008, with completion expected in 2010. McLain told The Huntsville Times that the name Constellation is "a nod to Huntsville's space heritage, while also reflecting that it offers a 'collection' of venues, just as a constellation is a collection of stars." Construction on the SpringHill Suites began in August 2008 with a Courtyard by Marriott projected as "soon to follow". As of August 2021, only the SpringHill Suites is finished and open for business, but the rest of the development began construction in late 2020.

The site includes a tree planted in 1961, the year the original mall opened, and the developer plans to continue to include this tree in the "Constellation" development. McLain is working to have the project Leadership in Energy and Environmental Design (LEED) certified.
