= Jill Stevens =

American soldier and Miss Utah

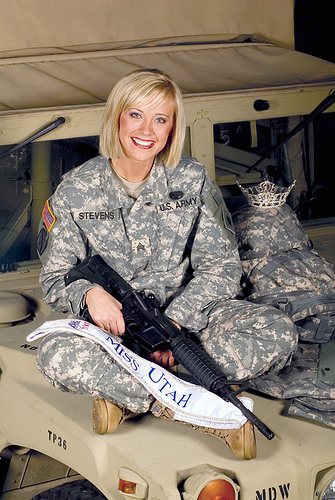
- Born: February 28, 1983 (age 43)
- Military career
- Allegiance: United States
- Branch: Army National Guard
- Service years: 2001–?
- Rank: Sergeant
- Units: 1st Battalion, 211th Aviation Regiment
- Conflicts: Afghanistan War

Jill Stevens
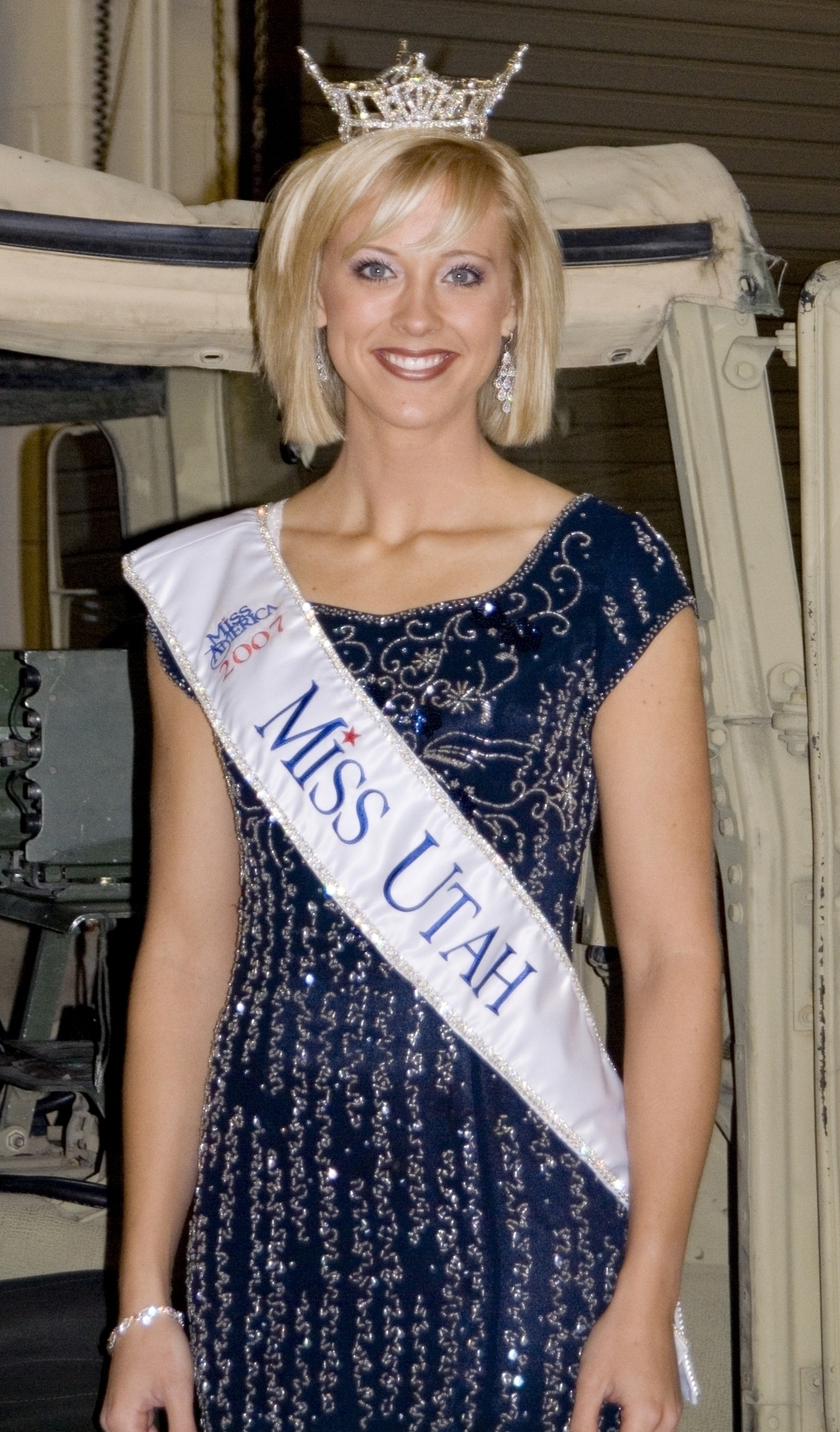
- Born: February 28, 1983 (age 43)
- Education: Southern Utah University
- Spouse: Kerry Shepherd (m. 2009)
- Beauty pageant titleholder
- Title: Miss Davis County 2007; Miss Utah 2007
- Hair color: Blonde
- Eye color: Blue
- Major competition: Miss America 2008 (Top 16)

Jill Stevens (born February 28, 1983) is a Miss Utah 2007. She was chosen as Miss Southern Utah University and Miss Davis County. She is a combat medic in the Utah Army National Guard and served as a medic during an 18-month tour in Afghanistan from 2004 to 2006 supporting Operation Enduring Freedom.

== Biography ==
Stevens joined the Army National Guard six months before 9/11. In November 2003, she was deployed to Afghanistan, returning home in April 2005. She has earned five medals for her outstanding service S was the first female finisher of the inaugural Afghanistan Marathon, making a total of 12 marathons she has completed together with earning the highest Fitness award during Army Basic Training. In representing the Army National Guard, Sergeant Stevens addressed generals from 40 different nations gathered at Hill Air Force Base.

Stevens graduated summa cum laude from the nursing program at Southern Utah University on a four-year leadership scholarship. She placed third in the Cinco De Mayo Sailboat Regatta in Mexico. She was chosen as one of four "Women of Strength" featured in Muscle & Fitness Hers magazine's September/October 2007 issue. Stevens has been a fitness instructor for Gold's Gym for several years, as well as a bread baker for Great Harvest.

Stevens was Miss Utah 2007, and competed in the Miss America Pageant in January 2008. On January 26, 2008, she was named the "America's Choice" semi-finalist in the Miss America 2008 pageant. This was the first time a 16th semi-finalist was named in the competition, and she was the only semi-finalist not to be selected by the judges. Stevens was eliminated after the swimsuit competition, along with five other semi-finalists. She was the only contestant to wear a one-piece swimsuit. When her name was announced, she dropped to the stage and started doing push-ups.

Stevens is a member of the MormonTimes.com racing team.

Stevens married Kerry Shepherd in January 2009.

== Sources ==
- Farmer, Molly (1 July 2008), "Jill Stevens: beauty queen, runner, soldier, and author", MormonTimes, archived from the original on 2011-07-14
- Fantin, Linda (6 December 2007), "Ten Hut! The military's Miss America candidate", Newsweek
- "Miss Utah is medic for Utah Guard", Deseret Morning News, 3 July 2007, archived from the original on July 5, 2007
- G.I. Jill by Joshua Hudson, May 2008, G.I. Jobs magazine
