= Julia Bachison =

American beauty queen

- Born: Julia Marie Bachison; April 28, 1983 (age 43)
- Height: 5 ft 7 in (1.70 m)
- Beauty pageant titleholder
- Title: Miss Utah 2005; Miss Utah USA 2008
- Hair color: Brown
- Eye color: Brown
- Major competitions: Miss America 2006 (Preliminary Awards, Lifestyle and Fitness in Swimsuit) Miss USA 2008 (Top 15)

Julia Marie Bachison (born April 28, 1983) is an American beauty queen who won the 2008 Miss Utah USA pageant. Bachison also won the Miss Utah pageant in 2005, becoming the first woman in Utah to hold both pageant titles.

== Biography ==
Bachison was born on April 28, 1983. She graduated from Weber High School and is currently studying broadcast journalism with a political emphasis at Weber State University. Bachison was involved in a number of athletic and extracurricular organizations during high school including the water polo team, track team, and cross-country team, Chamber Choir and the seminary council. She continues to run and is actively involved with marathons. She is the organizer and producer of the annual Fitness Fun Run in North Ogden and Marketing Director of the 2007 KJZZ/Deseret Morning News Marathon.

Bachison has starred in several musicals, including a lead role in Joseph and the Amazing Technicolor Dreamcoat and played Lola in Damn Yankees in spring of 2007. She entertained soldiers and their families for the return of troops from Iraq at Fort Douglas and Hill Air Force Base. Bachison has also performed at a variety of sport venues including the Raptors minor league baseball games, ReAL Salt Lake professional soccer games, and the Utah JAZZ NBA games.

Bachison's community involvement includes volunteering at Youth Connections department in the Ogden-Weber Action Center, being an Action for Healthy Kids member, and sitting on the Weber County Fair board. As Miss Utah America 2005, she was the Spokesperson for the Utah Department of Health's Gold Medal Schools, a program designed to help students eat healthy, be active and stay tobacco free. She continues to work with the program.

Her previous work experience includes working as administrative assistant to the State of Utah Speaker of the House, a bridal consultant for Dawn’s Bridal and Ivy Lane Reception Center, and hiring supervisor for Kelly Services. Throughout 2007, Bachison hosted the Utah’s 24 TV's Community Calendar, a weekly segment highlighting activities and events in the state of Utah. She has done work as a model as well, working with fashion designers such as Jovani.

Bachison is a member of The Church of Jesus Christ of Latter-day Saints.

== Pageants ==
=== Miss Utah 2005 ===
Bachison won her first major pageant title on June 18, 2005, when she was crowned Miss Utah 2005. This was Bachison's third attempt at the title, having placed in the Top 10 in 2003 and 2004. She first competed in the Miss Utah pageant as Miss North Ogden 2002, then as Miss Weber County 2003, and finally as Miss Utah State Fair 2004 to win the title.

=== Miss America 2006 ===
On January 21, 2006, Bachison represented the state of Utah in the national Miss America 2006 pageant, where she won the Preliminary Lifestyle and Fitness in Swimsuit Award. CMT broadcast the pageant live from the Aladdin Resort and Casino's Theatre for the Performing Arts. The pageant was won by Jennifer Berry of Oklahoma.

=== Miss Utah USA 2008 ===
Bachison was crowned Miss Utah USA 2008 on October 13, 2007, at University of Utah's Kingsbury Hall, becoming the first woman in the state's history to win both the Miss Utah USA and Miss Utah America titles.

=== Miss USA 2008 ===
As Miss Utah USA 2008, Bachison competed in the Miss USA 2008 pageant on April 11, 2008, and placed in the Top 15. The pageant was held in Las Vegas, Nevada, at the Theatre for the Performing Arts in the Planet Hollywood Resort and Casino and was broadcast live on NBC and distributed internationally.

Preceded by Amy Davis	Miss Utah; 2005	Succeeded by Katie Millar
Preceded by Heather Anderson	Miss Utah USA; 2008	Succeeded by Laura Chukanov
