= Fairfield by Marriott =

Economy hotel chain run by Marriott International

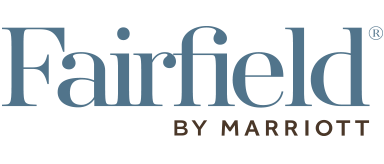
- Logo used from 2019
- Industry: hospitality industry
- Founded: October 1987
- Number of locations: 1,169 (30 June 2021)
- Area served: Worldwide
- Website: https://www.marriott.com/brands/fairfield-by-marriott.mi

Fairfield by Marriott is a franchised economy to midscale hotel brand of Marriott International. The properties target guests willing to accept fewer amenities for lower prices. Cost-saving measures included standardized building architecture and bedding, and the absence of a full-service restaurant, but a complimentary hot breakfast.

As of June 30, 2021, the brand had 1,169 hotels with 114,986 rooms with an additional 387 hotels with 47,476 rooms in the pipeline. Amenities at most properties include a pool, whirlpool, health club, same-day dry cleaning, vending machines, free Wi-Fi, an ergonomic desk and chair, a complimentary hot breakfast, and in-room television. The brand was named Fairfield Inn & Suites between 1987–2019.

== Overview ==
Logo of the former brand, Fairfield Inn & Suites (1987–2019)

Marriott International developed the concept for Fairfield Inn in the late 1980s to compete with other economy limited-service (ELS) hotel chains (below $45 a night) like Days Inn, Hampton Inn, and Red Roof Inn. The first location opened in October 1987 in Atlanta, Georgia. Management implemented scorecard terminals to allow guests to rate the hotels as either 'excellent', 'average', or 'poor'. Marriott was then able to track important metrics and provide superior customer service. Additionally, employee selection emphasized the appointment of friendly and positive staff, which also reduced turnover. This was achieved by providing higher wages than competitors (at the time being in the top 25% of wages within the lodging industry).

The brand formerly included properties dubbed "Fairfield Suites"; however, in 1998, those properties became the separate SpringHill Suites chain within the Marriott corporation. Many properties feature both suites and rooms, and these were called "Fairfield Inn & Suites." The chain has generally moved away from outside-opening doors in its more recent constructions, preferring traditional interior halls.

In 2004, brand head Liam Brown wanted the brand to move from the budget tier of hotels into the moderate tier by renovating newer locations and closing aging ones. The brand introduced coffee in the hotel rooms, express check-out, and newspaper delivery.

In 2013, the brand expanded to Asia. In 2019, the Fairfield Inn & Suites Denver Tech Center opened, the 1000th Fairfield property worldwide. In August 2020, the brand expanded to Peru. In April 2021, Marriott tested a contactless vending machine at Fairfield Inns. In June 2021, the first brand location in Europe opened.

== Concept ==
The brand name comes from the Fairfield Farm in Hume, Virginia, which J. Willard Marriott purchased as a family retreat. Originally owned by the King of England, the farm reminded Marriott of the western ranches of his childhood. After being refurbished in 1997, Fairfield Farm opened as Marriott's only bed and breakfast, The Inn at Fairfield Farm.

== Accommodations ==
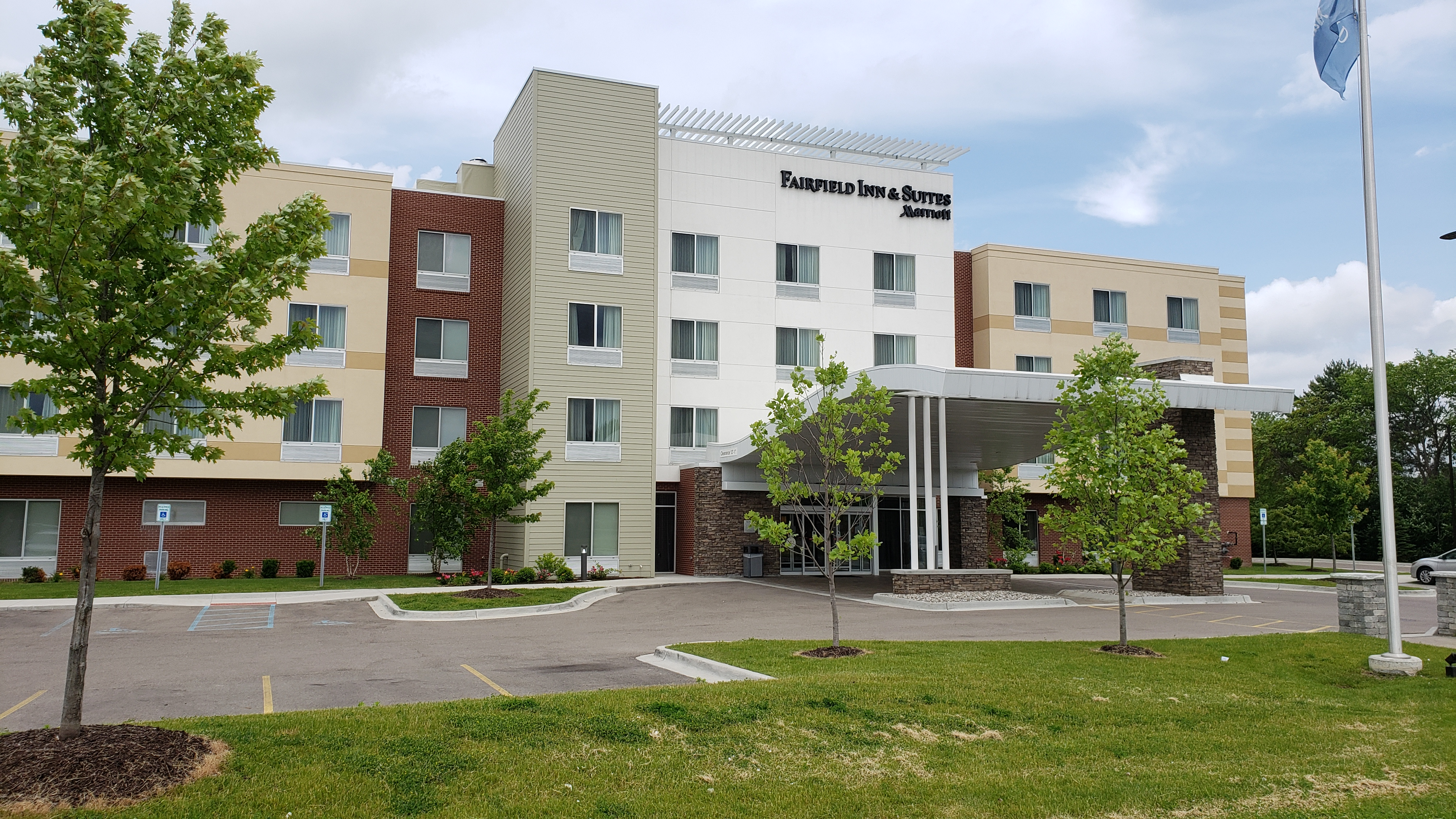
Typical newer Fairfield location, Canton, Michigan

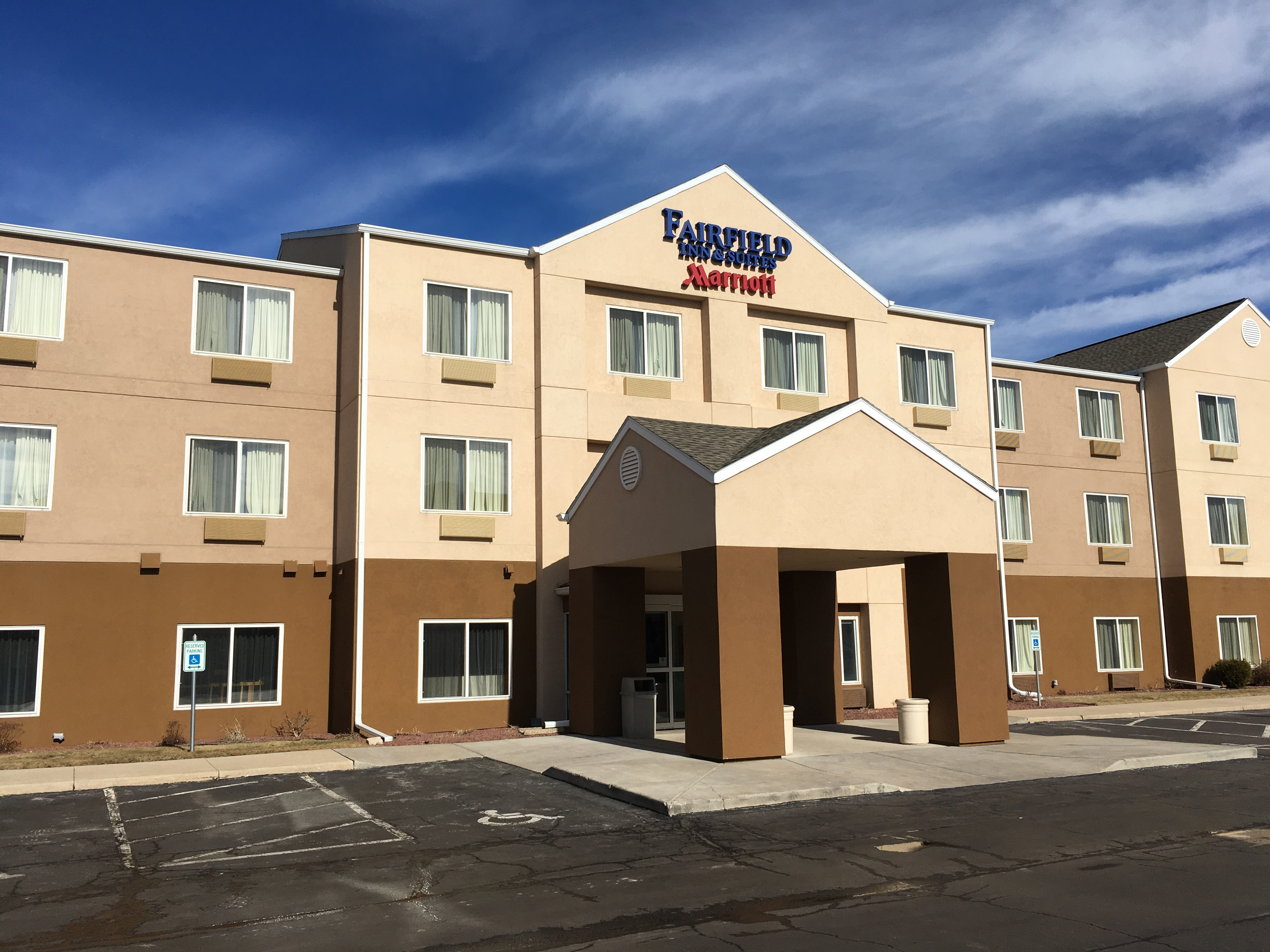
Typical late 1990s - early/mid 2000s location, Green Bay, Wisconsin

=== Historical ===
| | | US | Non-US | Total |
|---|---|---|---|---|
| 2006 | Properties | | | 518 |
| 2006 | Rooms | | | 46,589 |
| 2007 | Properties | 529 | 8 | 537 |
| 2007 | Rooms | 46,930 | 947 | 47,877 |
| 2008 | Properties | 560 | 9 | 569 |
| 2008 | Rooms | 49,678 | 1,109 | 50,787 |
| 2009 | Properties | 620 | 9 | 629 |
| 2009 | Rooms | 55,622 | 1,109 | 56,731 |
| 2010 | Properties | 648 | 10 | 658 |
| 2010 | Rooms | 58,510 | 1,235 | 59,745 |
| 2011 | Properties | 667 | 13 | 680 |
| 2011 | Rooms | 60,392 | 1,568 | 61,960 |
| 2012 | Properties | 678 | 13 | 691 |
| 2012 | Rooms | 61,477 | 1,568 | 63,045 |
| 2013 | Properties | 691 | 17 | 708 |
| 2013 | Rooms | 62,921 | 2,044 | 64,965 |
| 2014 | Properties | 704 | 17 | 721 |
| 2014 | Rooms | 64,362 | 2,089 | 66,451 |

=== From 2015 ===
| | | North America | Europe | Middle E. & Africa | Asia & Pacific | Caribbean Latin Am. | Total |
|---|---|---|---|---|---|---|---|
| 2015 | Properties | 761 | | | 2 | 5 | 768 |
| 2015 | Rooms | 69,970 | | | 314 | 788 | 71,072 |
| 2016 | Properties | 828 | | | 5 | 7 | 840 |
| 2016 | Rooms | 76,432 | | | 918 | 1,056 | 78,406 |
| 2017 | Properties | 895 | | | 14 | 10 | 919 |
| 2017 | Rooms | 82,699 | | | 2,268 | 1,467 | 86,434 |
| 2018 | Properties | 940 | | | 26 | 13 | 979 |
| 2018 | Rooms | 88,052 | | | 4,403 | 1,833 | 94,288 |
| 2019 | Properties | 1,001 | | | 42 | 14 | 1,057 |
| 2019 | Rooms | 94,063 | | | 7,050 | 2,036 | 103,149 |
| 2020 | Properties | 1,061 | | | 58 | 13 | 1,132 |
| 2020 | Rooms | 99,901 | | | 9,300 | 1,863 | 111,064 |
| 2021 | Properties | 1,112 | | | 78 | 14 | 1,204 |
| 2021 | Rooms | 105,330 | | | 11,970 | 1,971 | 119,271 |
| 2022 | Properties | 1,141 | | | 96 | 16 | 1,253 |
| 2022 | Rooms | 108,338 | | | 14,283 | 2,222 | 124,843 |
| 2023 | Properties | 1,153 | | | 119 | 18 | 1,290 |
| 2023 | Rooms | 109,445 | | | 17,361 | 2,576 | 129,382 |
