= Miss Utah =

Beauty pageant competition

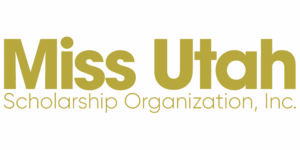
- Formation: 1926
- Type: Beauty pageant
- Headquarters: Salt Lake City
- Location: Utah
- Members: Miss America
- Official language: English
- Website: Official website

The Miss Utah competition is the pageant that selects the representative for the state of Utah in the Miss America competition. Two Miss Utah titleholders have won the Miss America pageant.

Erika Dalton of St. George was crowned Miss Utah on June 20, 2026, at the Capitol Theatre in Salt Lake City, Utah. She will compete for the title of Miss America 2027.

== Gallery of past titleholders ==
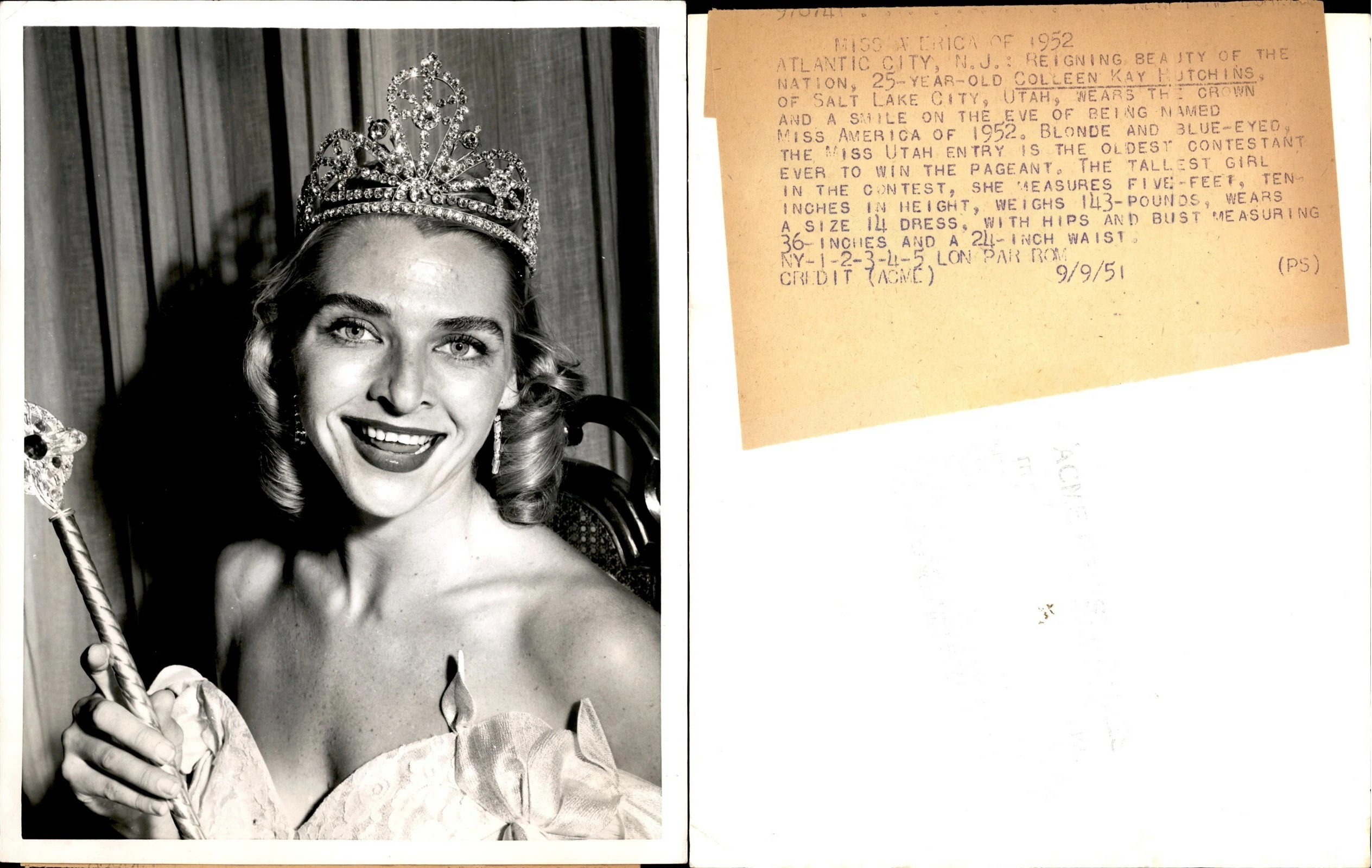
Colleen Kay Hutchins, Miss Utah 1951 and Miss America 1952

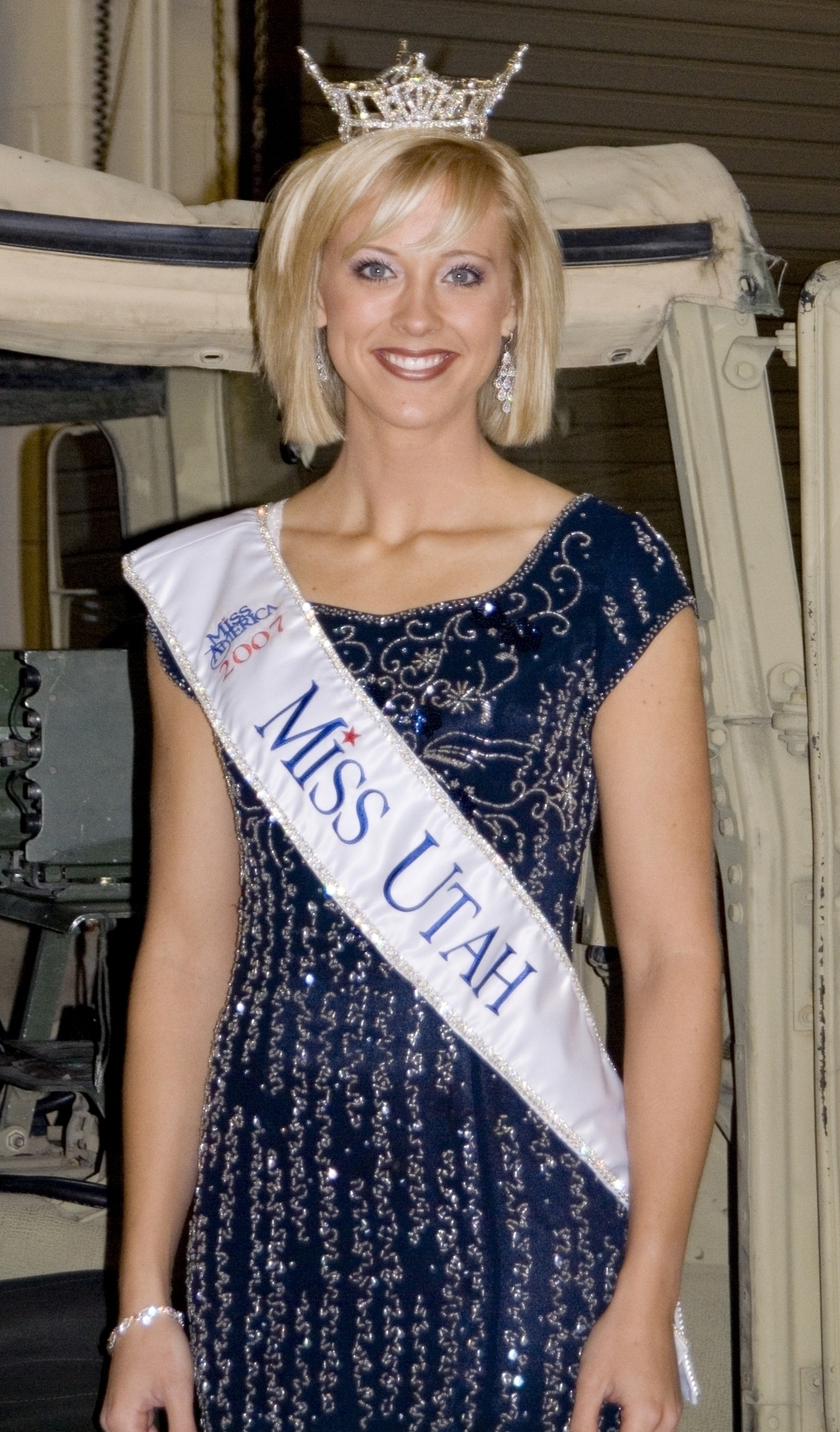
Jill Stevens,
Miss Utah 2007

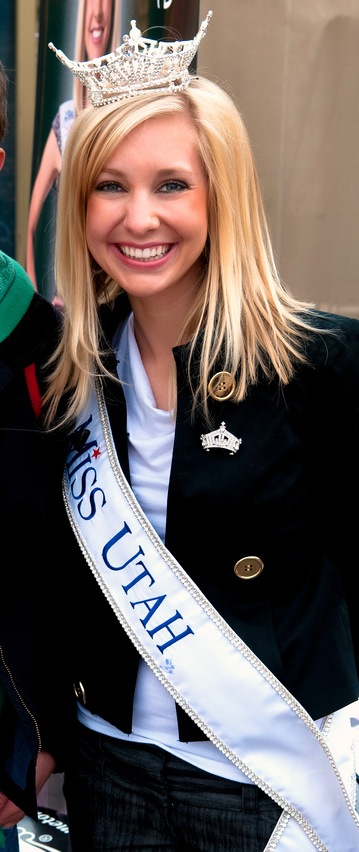
Whitney Merrifield,
Miss Utah 2009

== Results summary ==
The following is a visual summary of the past results of Miss Utah titleholders at the national Miss America pageants/competitions. The year in parentheses indicates the year of the national competition during which a placement and/or award was garnered, not the year attached to the contestant's state title.

=== Placements ===
- Miss Americas: Colleen Kay Hutchins (1952), Sharlene Wells (1985)
- 2nd runners-up: Muriel La Von Goodspeed (1938), Carolyn DeAnn Lasater (1962)
- 4th runners-up: Armelia Carol Ohmart (1946)
- Top 10: Janet Carolyn Secor (1959), Marian Faye Walker (1961), Frances Yvonne Vernon (1966), Jonelle Smith (1982), Jaclyn Hunt (2002), Katie Millar (2007), Sasha Sloan (2021)
- Top 11: Erika Dalton (2027)
- Top 15: Marilyn Robinson (1948), Christina Lowe (2011)
- Top 16: Jill Stevens (2008), Kara Arnold (2013)

=== Awards ===
==== Preliminary awards ====
- Preliminary Lifestyle and Fitness: Sharlene Wells (1985), Elizabeth Anne Johnson (1992), Amy Davis (2005), Julia Bachison (2006), Danica Olsen (2012)
- Preliminary Talent: Muriel La Von Goodspeed (1938), Marilyn Robinson (1948), Colleen Kay Hutchins (1952), Marian Faye Walker (1961), Carolyn DeAnn Lasater (1962), Sophia Symko (1989), Amanda Moody (1996), JessiKate Riley (2018), Jordyn Bristol (2026), Erika Dalton (2027)

==== Non-finalist awards ====
- Non-finalist Talent: Suzanne Storrs Poulton (1956), Francine Louise Felt (1958), Sally Peterson (1973), Brenda Richardson (1974), Lynn Lambert (1984), Sophia Symko (1989), Jacque Dawn Tingey (1990), Jennifer Nakken (1991), Jennifer Ward (1993), Amanda Moody (1996), Mary McDonough (1998), Michele Mobley (1999), Vanessa Ballam (2000), Jami Leilani Palmer (2001), Stacy Johnson (2004), Kayla Barclay (2009), JessiKate Riley (2018), Jesse Craig (2019), Lindsey Larsen (2023)

==== Other awards ====
- Miss Congeniality: Sally Peterson (1973), Ciera Pekarcik (2014)
- America's Choice: Jill Stevens (2008)
- Bernie Wayne Talent Scholarship: Amanda Moody (1996)
- Charles & Teresa Brown Award: Krissia Beatty (2015)
- Equity and Justice Winner: Sasha Sloan (2022)
- Jean Bartel Social Impact Initiative 1st runner-up: Sasha Sloan (2022)
- Miss Photogenic: Amy Davis (2005)
- Quality of Life Award Winners: Jaclyn Hunt (2002)
- Quality of Life Award 2nd runners-up: Mary McDonough (1998)
- Quality of Life Award/Social Impact Initiative Scholarship Finalists: Dexonna Talbot (2020)
- Women in Business Finalist: Sasha Sloan (2022)

== Winners ==
- Declared as winner
- Ended as a runner-up
- Ended as a finalist or semi-finalist

Year	Name	Hometown	Age	Local Title	Miss America Talent	Placement at Miss America	Special scholarships at Miss America	Notes
2026	Erika Dalton	St. George	26	Miss Nebo	Classical Violin	Top 11	Preliminary Talent Award	
2025	Jordyn Bristol	Lehi	26	Miss Timpanogos	Vocal		Preliminary Talent Award	
2024	Paris Matthews	Salt Lake City	26	Miss Panoramaland	Jazz Dance, "All That Jazz"			
2023	Sarah Sun	Salt Lake City	22	Miss Aspen Hills	Classical Piano			Previously Distinguished Young Woman of Utah 2019; 2nd runner-up to Distinguished Young Woman of America 2019
2022	Lindsey Larsen	Lehi	21	Miss Utah County	Ballet en Pointe		Non-Finalist Talent	
2021	Sasha Sloan	North Salt Lake	23	Miss Greater Salt Lake	Vocal, "That’s Life"	Top 10	Equity and Justice Award Jean Bartel Social Impact Initiative Scholarship 1st runner-up Women in Business Award Finalist	Known for creating and playing "Narcissa Malfoy (née Black)" in the TikTok series "The Noble House of Black", which is a famous fan-made series about the three Black sisters from the Harry Potter franchise.
2019–20	Dexonna Talbot	Spanish Fork	19	Miss Greater Salt Lake	Ballet en Pointe		Social Impact Initiative Scholarship Finalist	
2018	Jesse Craig	Orem	22	Miss Timpanogos	Violin, "Misirlou and the Bee"		Non-finalist Talent Award	Daughter of Miss Utah 1991, Elizabeth Johnson Craig
2017	JessiKate Riley	Beaver	20	Miss Panoramaland	Classical Violin, "Praeludium and Allegro" by Fritz Kreisler		Non-finalist Talent Award Preliminary Talent Award	Previously Miss Utah's Outstanding Teen 2014 Later Miss Utah USA 2021
2016	Lauren Wilson	Pleasant Grove	21	Miss Northern Utah County	Dance, "Libertango"			
2015	Krissia Beatty	St. George	22	Miss Nebo	Piano, "All of Me"		Charles & Teresa Brown Award	
2014	Karlie Major	Logan	20	Miss Cache Valley	Dance, "Forget About the Boy" from Thoroughly Modern Millie			
2013	Ciera Pekarcik	Farmington	23	Miss Panoramaland	Vocal, "Via Dolorosa"		Miss Congeniality	
2012	Kara Arnold	Bountiful	22	Miss Davis County	Piano, "Ballade No. 1 in G Minor"	Top 16		
2011	Danica Olsen	Tooele	21	Miss Utah Valley University	Dance, "Come Fly with Me"		Preliminary Lifestyle & Fitness Award	
2010	Christina Lowe	Midway	21	Miss Utah County	Vocal, "Footprints in the Sand"	Top 15		
2009	Whitney Merrifield	Lindon	19	Miss Utah County	Classical Piano, "Moment musical in E minor, Op. 16/4"			Top 10 at National Sweetheart 2008 pageant
2008	Kayla Barclay	Manti	19	Miss Sanpete County	Piano		Non-finalist Talent Award	
2007	Jill Stevens	Kaysville	24	Miss Davis County	Vocal, "Shy" from Once Upon a Mattress	Top 16		Voted into the Top 16 as "America's Choice" by viewers of the TLC Network's Miss America: Reality Check series Combat Medical with Utah National Guard, completed an 18-month-tour in Afghanistan
2006	Katie Millar	Highland	20	Miss Timpanogos	Electric Violin, "Souvenir D'Amerique, Variations on Yankee Doodle"	Top 10		
2005	Julia Bachison	North Ogden	22	Miss Utah State Fair	Vocal, "I've Got the World on a String"		Preliminary Lifestyle & Fitness Award	Later Miss Utah USA 2008; Top 15 at Miss USA 2008 pageant
2004	Amy Davis	Bountiful	23	Miss Salt Lake Valley	Classical Piano, "Étude Op. 10, No. 12"		Miss Photogenic Preliminary Lifestyle & Fitness Award	
2003	Stacy Johnson	Provo	21	Miss Provo	Latin Jazz Dance, "Man of La Mancha"		Non-finalist Talent Award	
2002	Natalie Camille Johnson	Bountiful	22	Miss Northern Utah	Classical Piano, Prelude in G minor" by Sergei Rachmaninoff			
2001	Jaclyn Hunt	Lehi	20	Miss Utah County	Classical Piano, "Piano Concerto No. 2" by Sergei Rachmaninoff	Top 10	Quality of Life Award	
2000	Jami Leilani Palmer	Tremonton	20	Miss Northern Counties	Classical Piano, "Piano Concerto in A Minor" by Edvard Grieg		Non-finalist Talent Award	
1999	Vanessa Ballam	Logan	20	Miss Cache Valley/Logan	Vocal, "When I Look At You" from The Scarlet Pimpernel		Non-finalist Talent Award	
1998	Michele Mobley	Sandy City	21	Miss Sandy City	Classical Vocal, "Glitter and Be Gay" from Candide		Non-finalist Talent Award	
1997	Mary McDonough	Layton	19	Miss Davis County	Piano, "Des Danzas Creoles" by Alberto Ginastera		Non-finalist Talent Award Quality of Life Award 2nd runner-up	
1996	Nanette Pearson	Pleasant Grove	23	Miss Salt Lake Valley	Classical Ballet, La Boutique fantasque			
1995	Amanda Moody	Orem	19	Miss Orem	Classical Piano, "Ballade No. 4"		Bernie Wayne Talent Scholarship Non-finalist Talent Award Preliminary Talent Award	
1994	Brooke Anderson	West Valley City	21	Miss West Valley City	Ballet			
1993	Marquessa Glee Bullock	Providence	20	Miss Utah State University	Classical Piano, "1st Movement from Concerto No. 1" by Sergei Rachmaninoff			
1992	Jennifer Ward	Salt Lake City	19	Miss Salt Lake Valley	Classical Violin, "Scherzo Tarantella"		Non-finalist Talent Award Quality of Life Award Finalist	4th runner-up at National Sweetheart pageant
1991	Elizabeth Anne Johnson	Orem	21	Miss Utah State Fair	Classical Piano, "Hungarian Rhapsodies"		Preliminary Swimsuit Award	Mother of Miss Utah 2018, Jesse Craig 1st runner-up at National Sweetheart pageant
1990	Jennifer Nakken	Cedar City	20	Miss Iron County	Lyrical Dance, "The Sound of Music"		Non-finalist Talent Award	
1989	Jacque Dawn Tingey	Centerville	25	Miss Intermountain Region	Vocal, "Over the Rainbow"		Non-finalist Talent Award	
1988	Sophia Symko	Salt Lake City	21	Miss University of Utah	Piano, "Rhapsodie espagnole"		Non-finalist Talent Award Preliminary Talent Award	
1987	Marianne Bales	Orem	21	Miss Orem	Lyrical Dance & Vocal, "Let Me Dance For You"			
1986	Donna Clark	Salt Lake City	22	Miss University of Utah	Ballet			
1985	Gina Larsen	Provo	21	Miss Utah State Fair	Popular Vocal, "Greatest Love of All"			
1984	Nancy Gail Ayers			Miss Salt Lake Valley		Did not compete; later assumed title after Wells won Miss America 1985		
1984	Sharlene Wells	Salt Lake City	20	Miss Utah Valley	Spanish Vocal & Paraguayan Harp, "Mis Noches Sin Ti"	Winner	Preliminary Lifestyle & Fitness Award	
1983	Lynn Lambert	Provo	21	Miss Provo	Classical Piano, "Concerto No. 2, 3rd Movement" by Rachmaninoff		Non-finalist Talent Award	
1982	Cindy Quinn	Provo	21	Miss Utah State Fair	Classical Vocal, "Habanera" from Carmen			
1981	Jonelle Smith	Provo	23	Miss Utah Valley	Classical Vocal, "Sempre Libera" from La traviata	Top 10		
1980	Jean Bullard	Provo	22	Miss Indian	Vocal Medley, "He Touched Me" from Drat! The Cat! & "Maybe This Time" from Cabaret			
1979	Karen L. Brimley	Layton	19	Miss Weber State College	Semi-classical Vocal, "Love Is Where You Find It"			
1978	Jami Coombs	Tremonton	19	Miss Wheat & Beet	Classical Piano, "Piano Concerto in A Minor" by Edvard Grieg			
1977	Kristy Deakin	Brigham City	19	Miss Brigham City	Baton Twirling			
1976	Suzanne McKay	Salt Lake City	22	Miss Salt Lake County Fair	Organ Medley, "Yankee Doodle Dandy" & "God Bless America"			
1975	Barbara LaVerne Hanks	Sandy	24	Miss Latter Day Saints Business College	Jazz Dance, "I'm a Brass Band" from Sweet Charity			
1974	Jill Lynn Smith	American Fork	19	Miss American Fork	Classical Piano, "Piano Concerto in A Minor" by Edvard Grieg			Did not compete; assumed title after Kathy White relinquished title to marry Wayne Osmond.
1974	Kathlyn Louise White	Bountiful	21	Miss Davis County Fair	Classical Vocal, "Voices of Spring"			Relinquished title to marry Wayne Osmond.
1973	Brenda Richardson	Provo	20	Miss Brigham Young University	Vocal Medley		Non-finalist Talent Award	
1972	Sally Peterson	Salt Lake City	21	Miss University of Utah	Classical Piano, "Piano Concerto No. 1"		Miss Congeniality Non-finalist Talent Award	
1971	Janis Gentry	Vernal	19	Miss UBIC	Vocal, "Shy" from Once Upon a Mattress			
1970	Deborah Melba Dunn	Salt Lake City	20	Miss Stevens-Henager College	Modern Dance, "Julia"			
1969	Susan Nielson	Salt Lake City	20	Miss Utah National Guard	Ballet, "Eleven Studies for Eleven Players" by Ned Rorem			
1968	Kathleen Frances Wood	Salt Lake City	19	Miss Midvale	Monologue, "The Promise of One Person On This Planet"			
1967	Patricia Soutas	Salt Lake City	20	Miss Utah State Fair	Magic Act & Original Vocal, "Everyone Has Magic"			
1966	Georgia Lynne Johnson	Salt Lake City	21	Miss Rose Park	Dramatic Reading from Medea			
1965	Frances Yvonne Vernon	Salt Lake City	22	Miss Utah Air Force Reserve	Original Modern Dance, "The American Pioneer Woman"	Top 10		
1964	Lois Anne Bailey	Salt Lake City	18	Miss Salt Lake City	Piano, "Symphonie espagnole"			
1963	Annette Bates	Salt Lake City		Miss Salt Lake City	Classical Vocal, "Adele's Laughing Song" from Die Fledermaus			
1962	Judith Ann Ridd	Magna	19	Miss Logan	Modern Interpretive Dance			
1961	Carolyn DeAnn Lasater	Salt Lake City	19	Miss Utah National Guard	Pantomime Dance, "My Life in a Day"	2nd runner-up	Preliminary Talent Award	
1960	Marian Faye Walker	Salt Lake City	27	Miss Utah National Air Force Reserve	Classical Vocal, "The Waltz Aria" from Mireille	Top 10	Preliminary Talent Award	
1959	Jacqueline Winterrose	Salt Lake City	22		Character Dance, "Tequila"			
1958	Janet Carolyn Secor	Salt Lake City			Classical Ballet, "The Waltz" from The Sleeping Beauty	Top 10		
1957	Francine Louise Felt	Salt Lake City	19		Classical Violin, Fritz Kreisler’s “Tambourine Chinois”		Non-finalist Talent Award	Francine Louise Felt Potter passed away on January 1, 2024 at age 86.
1956	Joan Hinckley Willes	Salt Lake City	19		Original Comedy Skit			
1955	Suzanne Storrs Poulton	Salt Lake City					Non-finalist Talent Award	
1954	Maurine Howarth Parker	Ogden	18		Drama, "Anne of the Thousand Days"			
1953	Ina Lavon Brown	Provo			Drama			
1952	Marylyn Reese	Brigham			Monologue, "The Mudlark" & "Our Town"			
1951	Colleen Kay Hutchins	Salt Lake City	25		Dramatic Monologue, "Elizabeth the Queen" by Maxwell Anderson	Winner	Preliminary Talent Award	
1950	Joanne Marguerite Hinand	Provo	19		East Indian Dance			
1949	June Elizabeth Barlow	Bountiful	24		Vocal / Dress Design, "Villanelle" & "The Wren"			
1948	Marilyn Robinson	Ogden			Dramatic Monologue, "Tommy, Tommy, Tommy"	Top 15	Preliminary Talent Award	
1947	Donna Jean Southwick	Cedar City	18		Drama, Piano, Vocal, & Dance			
1946	Armelia Carol Ohmart	Salt Lake City			Vocal, "I Won't Tell a Soul"	4th runner-up		Television and film actress with a career from the late 40s to mid 70s, credits include the movie House on Haunted Hill
1945	Dorothy Holohan	Salt Lake City			Ballet			
1944	No Utah representative at Miss America pageant							
1943	No Utah representative at Miss America pageant							
1942	No Utah representative at Miss America pageant							
1941	No Utah representative at Miss America pageant							
1940	No Utah representative at Miss America pageant							
1939	No Utah representative at Miss America pageant							
1938	Muriel La Von Goodspeed	Salt Lake City			Classical Vocal & Piano	2nd runner-up	Preliminary Talent Award	
1937	No Utah representative at Miss America pageant							
1936	No Utah representative at Miss America pageant							
1935	No Utah representative at Miss America pageant							
1934	No national pageant was held							
1933	No Utah representative at Miss America pageant							
1932	No national pageants were held							
1931	No national pageants were held							
1930	No national pageants were held							
1929	No national pageants were held							
1928	No national pageants were held							
1927	Esther Kilpatrick	Salt Lake City						
1926	Doretta "Dora" Carstensen	Salt Lake City	16					
1925	No Utah representative at Miss America pageant							
1924	No Utah representative at Miss America pageant							
1923	No Utah representative at Miss America pageant							
1922	No Utah representative at Miss America pageant							
1921	No Utah representative at Miss America pageant							

- Marie Windsor – "unofficial" 1939 winner
