= Orion Amphitheater =

Open-air theater in Huntsville, Alabama

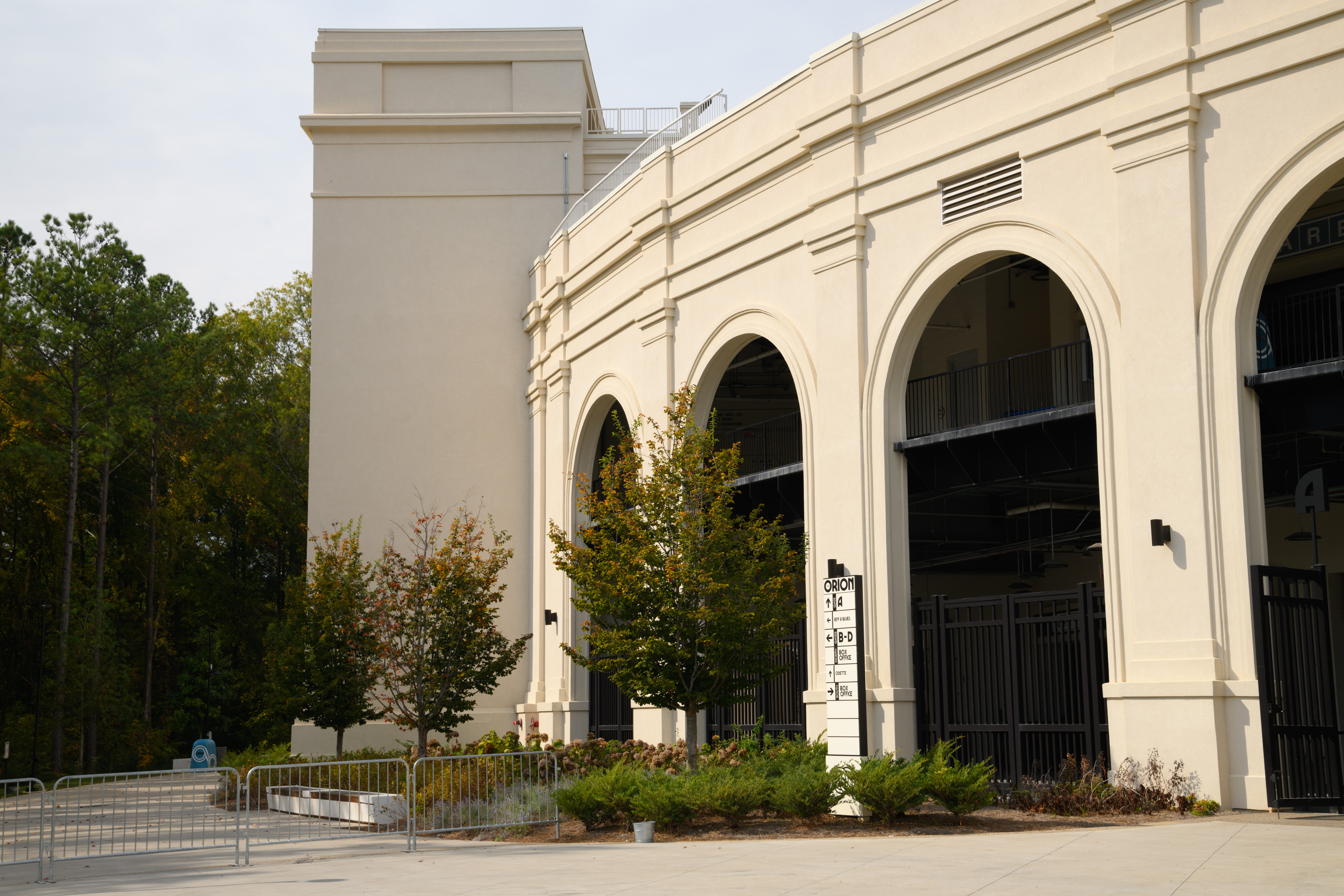
- The exterior of the Orion Amphitheater in October, 2024
- Interactive map of Orion Amphitheater
- Address: 701 Amphitheater Drive NW; Huntsville, AL 35806
- Coordinates: 34°44′03.7″N 86°40′05.7″W
- Capacity: 8000
- Type: Amphitheater
- Events: Music and concerts

Construction
- Opened: 2022
- Architect: David M. Schwarz Architects, Inc.

Website
- theorionhuntsville.com

The Orion Amphitheater is an amphitheatre in the MidCity District of Huntsville, Alabama.

The amphitheater, which cost $40 million to build, is owned by the city of Huntsville. It was designed by David M. Schwarz Architects, Inc., and is run by the Huntsville Venue Group, a division of Mumford & Sons keyboardist Ben Lovett's Venue Group.

The amphitheater opened in 2022, on the weekend of May 13th through 15th. The grand opening event, titled "The First Waltz", featured performances by Brittany Howard, the Drive-By Truckers, Emmylou Harris, Jason Isbell, John Paul White, Mavis Staples, St. Paul and The Broken Bones, and others.

In 2024, the Orion Amphitheater was nominated for the Outdoor Concert Venue of the Year award in Pollstar's 36th annual awards.

== Artist garden ==
The Orion staff manage a garden located in a small meadow behind the amphitheater. The fruits, vegetables, and herbs that are grown in the garden are used in on-site catering and cocktails. The garden is also used as a place for relaxation by Orion staff and visiting musical artists.

Orion manager Ryan Murphy had previously established a similar garden at the St. Augustine Amphitheatre in Florida while he was a manager there.

== See also ==
- List of contemporary amphitheaters
