= Vanessa Williams and Miss America =

American performer's relationship with the pageant

Vanessa Williams
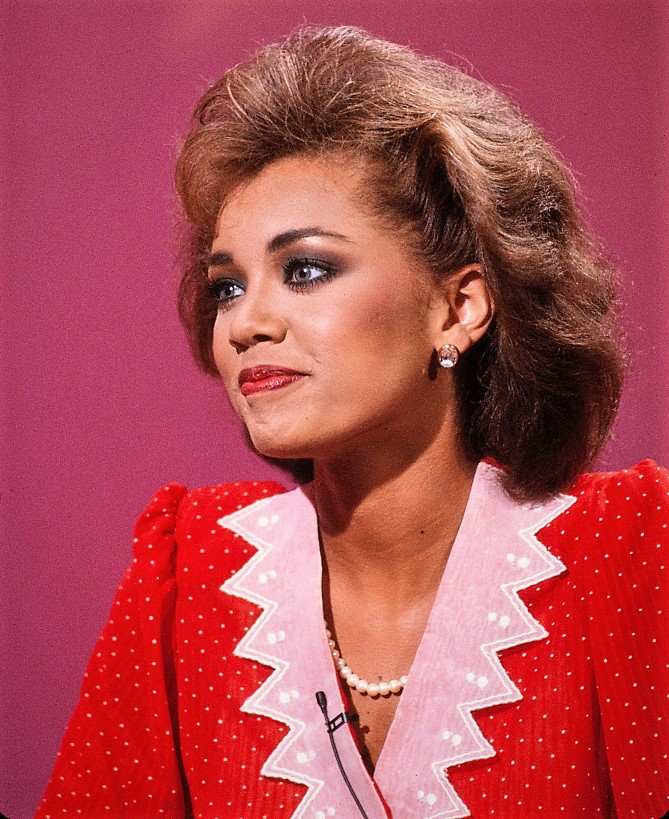
- Williams in 1984
- Known for: Miss America (First African American) – 1984
- Title: Miss Syracuse 1983; Miss New York 1983; Miss America 1984
- Term: September 17, 1983 – July 23, 1984 (resigned)
- Predecessor: Debra Maffett
- Successor: Suzette Charles
- Awards: Preliminary Talent (Voice), "Happy Days Are Here Again"; Preliminary Swimsuit

Vanessa Williams (born March 18, 1963) is an American actress, singer, and fashion designer. She initially gained recognition as the first African American winner of the Miss America title when she was crowned Miss America 1984 in September 1983. Several weeks before the end of her reign, however, a scandal arose when Penthouse magazine bought and published photographs of Williams that featured her nude and engaging in simulated sex acts with another female model. Williams was pressured to relinquish her title and was succeeded by the first runner-up, Miss New Jersey 1983, Suzette Charles. She was the first Miss America to give up her crown. Thirty-two years later, in September 2015, when Williams served as head judge for the Miss America 2016 pageant, former Miss America CEO Sam Haskell made a public apology to her for the events of 1984.

== Miss America 1984 ==
[I had] no idea that winning a Miss America title in 1983 would actually be so significant to people that had lived through the civil rights movement. And that to me was such an honor but also something that I had no idea the weight, and that there might be some bad consequences. To have white people who wanted to kill me because I was black and to have death threats against my family because they felt that I was tarnishing the Miss America crown because I was a black person. So it was an incredible time.

— Vanessa Williams in 2011 (Who Do You Think You Are?)

When she was 20 years old, Williams was approached by scouts from the Miss Syracuse pageant who had seen her perform while a student at Syracuse University. Despite their encouragement, Williams was not interested in participating in the pageant. She later changed her mind when she realized that she could earn scholarship money. Although she had never participated in a beauty pageant before, she won the title of Miss Syracuse in April 1983. She then went on to win Miss New York in July 1983. During the preliminaries for the Miss America pageant, Williams won "Preliminary Swimsuit" and "Preliminary Talent" (with a vocal performance of "Happy Days Are Here Again"). She was then crowned Miss America 1984 on September 17, 1983, becoming the first African American woman to win the title.

During her reign as Miss America, Williams was criticized in some venues for winning. She later stated that "there were a lot of people that did not want me to be representative of the United States and Miss America. And not just white people alone. There were a lot of people who had issues ... I was too light. My eyes were the wrong color. My hair wasn't the right texture and getting criticism for being who I was." She was also the target of persistent racist hate mail and death threats (which she documented in her memoir, You Have No Idea). Thirty years later, when Miss America 2014 Nina Davuluri (who was also a former Miss New York and Miss Syracuse) became the target of a racist social media backlash, Williams recounted the similarities with her own experiences, stating that she "wrote a book about everything that I went through, and I spent a lot of time talking about the death threats, the FBI, the sharpshooters ... it was a graver situation and more dangerous years ago—the change that was happening and the uproar because of the color of my skin."

Williams would later comment that she was one of five minority contestants that year, noting that ballet dancer Deneen Graham "had already had a cross burned on her front yard because she was the first black Miss North Carolina [1983]." She also pointed out that "Suzette Charles was the first runner-up, and she was biracial. But when the press started, when I would go out on the ... tour and do my appearances, and people would come up and say they never thought they'd see the day that it would happen; when people would want to shake my hand, and you'd see tears in their eyes, and they'd say, I never thought I'd see it in my lifetime—that's when, you know, it was definitely a very special honor."

=== Resignation ===
It began in the summer of 1982. I had finished my exams the first week of May at Syracuse University and came home to find a summer job. I saw an advertisement in a local newspaper reading "models wanted", so I called up and talked to Tom Chiapel, who was the photographer and part-owner of TEC studios. He said to come down for an interview ... When I returned later to pick up the proofs, Tom Chiapel indicated that he needed a makeup artist. He offered me an audition, so I came in and did a face. He decided to have me work for him as a makeup artist–receptionist ... I had worked there for a month and a half when Tom Chiapel mentioned several times that he'd like to shoot me in the nude. I had never posed nude and I was curious. I was 19 years old. I agreed. He assured me that none of the photographs would ever leave the studio. He assured me ... I trusted him not to do anything with the photographs. That was my error. I did not give my consent to him or Penthouse to ever have them published, used in any magazine or in any way. Nothing. I signed an application giving my height, weight, color of hair and my talents ... I never told anyone about the pictures, not even my parents. I did not think it was a concern. We had made an agreement they would never be published. I feel as if I were just a sacrificial lamb. The past just came up and kicked me. I felt betrayed and violated, like I had been raped.

— Vanessa Williams in 1984

In July 1984 (two months before the end of her reign), Williams learned that nude photos of her, taken before her involvement with the pageant, would be published without her consent in a future issue of Penthouse. The photos dated back to the summer of 1982 when she worked as an assistant and makeup artist for Mount Kisco, New York photographer Tom Chiapel. The published black-and-white photos comprised two sessions; the first featured Williams nude while the second set depicted Williams nude and engaging in simulated sex acts with another female model. Williams stated that Chiapel "had a concept of having two models pose nude for silhouettes, basically to make different shapes and forms. The light would be behind the models. I was reluctant, but since he assured me that I would be the only one to see them and I would not be identifiable in the photographs, I agreed." Chiapel claimed that Williams pursued a photoshoot specifically with another woman; he went on to note that Williams showed the photos to several of her friends and that she was "really proud" of them. In a 2012 interview with NPR, Williams explained that she was "being free", noting:

That was the mode I was in at that particular time, when I took those racy pictures, because I was already in college so you can't tell me what to do. So—I wasn't actually in high school—so my mentality was what—I'm living my own life; I'm a spirited, young woman; I can handle this; I can handle anything. And at 19, you think you rule the world, and you can control things. And a lot of times, you don't.

Hugh Hefner, the publisher of Playboy, was also given the opportunity to publish these photos but turned it down, stating: "The single victim in all of this was the young woman herself, whose right to make this decision was taken away from her. If she wanted to make this kind of statement, that would be her business, but the statement wasn't made by her." A Playboy spokesperson also advised that their magazine did not use "lesbian material".

After learning that Penthouse would be publishing these photos, the Miss America Organization responded by giving Williams 72 hours to resign. Williams later stated that "the heightened spectacle and circus of it all was kind of crazy. I had people saying 'Fight for the crown! Fight for the crown!' and people chanting 'Don't give it up! Don't secede!'" Williams also later noted that the situation was particularly hard on her mother Helen, who felt that she should not resign and was upset by the lack of support from the pageant organization.

Williams decided to resign and formally announced her decision at a press conference held on July 23, 1984. The title subsequently went to the first runner-up, Miss New Jersey Suzette Charles, who served out the final seven weeks of Williams' reign. On September 7, 1984, Williams filed a $500 million lawsuit against Chiapel and Penthouse publisher Bob Guccione; she dropped the lawsuit a year later stating that she wanted to put the scandal behind her. In addition Williams had signed a model release form when the photos were taken, therefore Penthouse had the right to publish the photos. Ultimately, Penthouse published the photos in its September 1984 issue, which the PBS documentary Miss America described as "the most successful issue Penthouse magazine ever printed, netting Guccione a windfall profit of $14 million." Another set of photos, shot the following month by Jonathan Aaron and picturing Williams in bondage gear, were published in the January 1985 issue.

== 1984–2015 ==
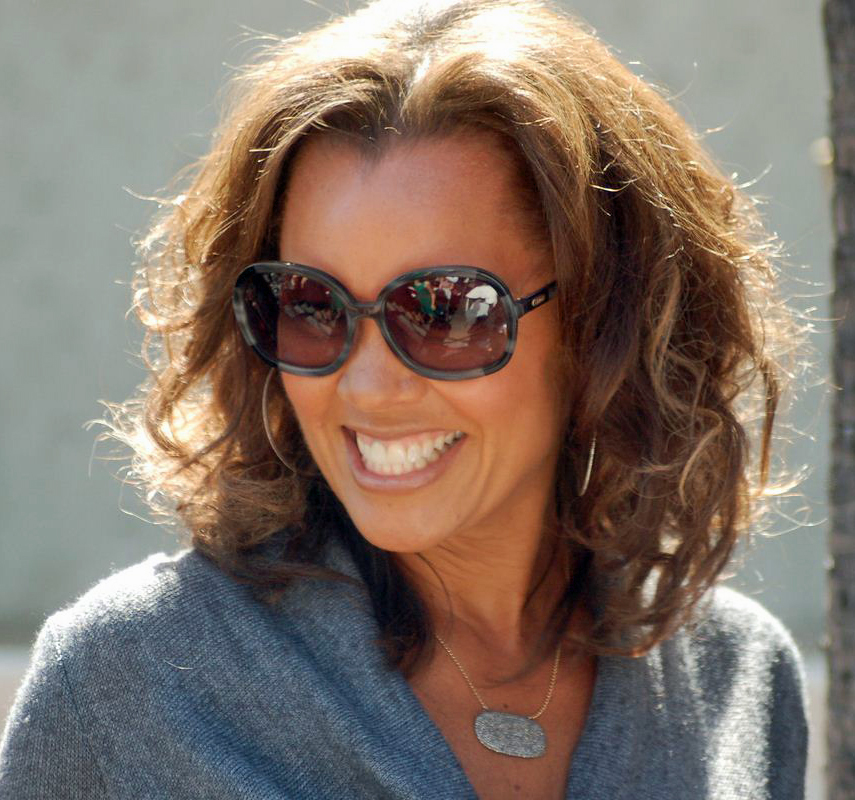
Williams in 2012

After her resignation, Williams rebounded as a recording artist and actress. However, she also faced a long period of what she would later describe as "the betrayal, and the humiliation, that happened to me on a grand scale." Essence magazine concurred stating that Williams was the subject of "public shaming and bullying from the public at large" and The Philadelphia Inquirer noted that her "career and reputation tanked. Overnight, [Williams] went from being America's darling to a national disgrace."

"I had so much trouble being taken seriously not only because I was a beauty queen but a scandalous beauty queen on top of that," she said, later adding in relation to Gershwin's reaction: "Having that perception of me was when I realized what an obstacle I'd have."

— Vanessa Williams in 2016

She would also later state that these events delayed her career by about ten years, as "it seemed like an eternity in which I was the punch line to every late-night monologue ... Joan Rivers, whom I adored and met on The Tonight Show during my reign, was particularly relentless. Just when I figured she'd exhausted every possible Vanessa Williams joke, she'd have a whole new slew of them." Williams would also later tell of one audition that she had during the late 1980s for a theatrical role. She was denied the role, however, because "the wife of lyricist Ira Gershwin decreed: 'Over my dead body will that whore be in my show.'" In addition, her parents experienced "an incredible amount of shame and humiliation" and were equally the subject of harassment at the time.

Thirty years after the scandal broke, Amanda Marcotte suggested in The Daily Beast that

We owe a lot to Vanessa Williams for being a pioneer when it comes to showing the world how to recover when you've been unjustly shamed for being sexual. Williams could have slunk off into the shadows in shame, which no doubt many people at the time expected her to do. Williams picked herself up and kept fighting for a career as an entertainer, first by becoming a successful singer and then becoming a well-known comic actress ... Sleazy people tried to drag Vanessa Williams down with accusations of being sexual 30 years ago, but she moved on, showing she had nothing to be ashamed of.

In addition, Williams commented on her ability to persevere after these events in a 2015 interview with Entertainment Tonight by stating that "you can't give up ... you always have to remember what you're made of and not let circumstances get in the way. They might delay your progress for the moment, but you always have to remember who you are, and that will give you the eyes on the prize."

== Miss America 2016 ==
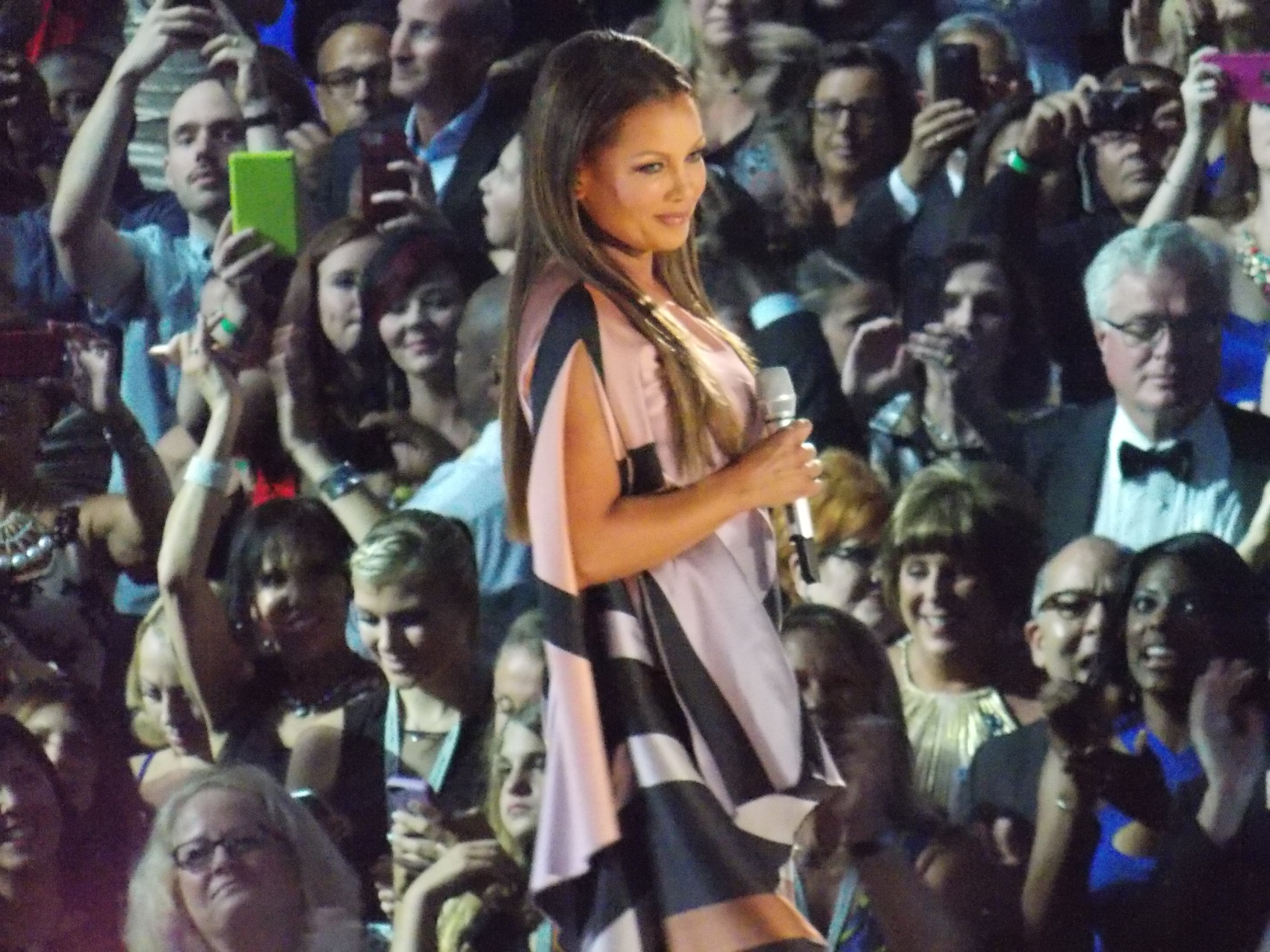
Williams at the conclusion of her performance of "Oh How the Years Go By" at Miss America 2016

Thirty-two years later, Williams returned to the Miss America stage on September 13, 2015, where she served as head judge for Miss America 2016 and sang "Oh How the Years Go By". After this performance, former Miss America CEO Sam Haskell issued a public apology to Williams, stating:

I have been a close friend of this beautiful and talented lady for 32 years. You have lived your life in grace and dignity, and never was it more evident than during the events of 1984, when you resigned. Though none of us currently in the organization were involved then, on behalf of today's organization, I want to apologize to you and to your mother, Miss Helen Williams. I want to apologize for anything that was said or done that made you feel any less the Miss America you are and the Miss America you always will be.

Williams responded by stating that she did the "best that I could, in my reign as Miss America, from 1983 to 1984."

A few months after the pageant, Williams discussed the apology in an interview with Gayle King, Charlie Rose, and Norah O'Donnell for CBS This Morning. King asked her about the circumstances that led to it stating, "I think many people were touched when the Miss America pageant issued an apology to you." Williams credited Haskell (who was one of her judges during the Miss America 1984 pageant) for orchestrating her return. While both she and her mother initially responded with hesitation to the invitation, Williams finally agreed to participate on the condition that she could sing her song "Oh How the Years Go By" (to symbolize the passing of time since she was Miss America). She did not know what Haskell would say, stating that she was simply told to stand and wait for him during the commercial break that would take place after her song. It was only when he arrived and placed his hand on her back (where she noticed that his hand was shaking) that Williams realized something significant was about to happen. Williams said that one of the most important outcomes of the apology was the positive impact that it had on her mother, who "endured a lot" during that period.

After the pageant, Williams' replacement Suzette Charles stated in an interview with Inside Edition that she was perplexed over the apology and suggested that it was given for the purpose of ratings. Williams had previously commented on the events surrounding her return, stating in an interview with Robin Roberts that "there's a lot of people who feel I should return, so the people who harbor the resentment I understand it but realize that all of those people that were part of the old guard are no longer there." In the same interview, Roberts mentioned to Williams that in the present day (c. 2015), "people now release [similar] things to make a career." Williams responded: "That's crazy. To think that oh you can look at a scandal and think that that would be good for your career, where for me it took every ounce of credibility and talent that I had and wiped it out."

== Notes ==
Awards and achievements
Preceded by Debra Maffett	Miss America; 1984	Succeeded by Suzette Charles
Preceded by Eileen Clark	Miss New York; 1983	Succeeded by Melissa Manning
