= Suzette Charles =

Singer, beauty queen (born 1963)

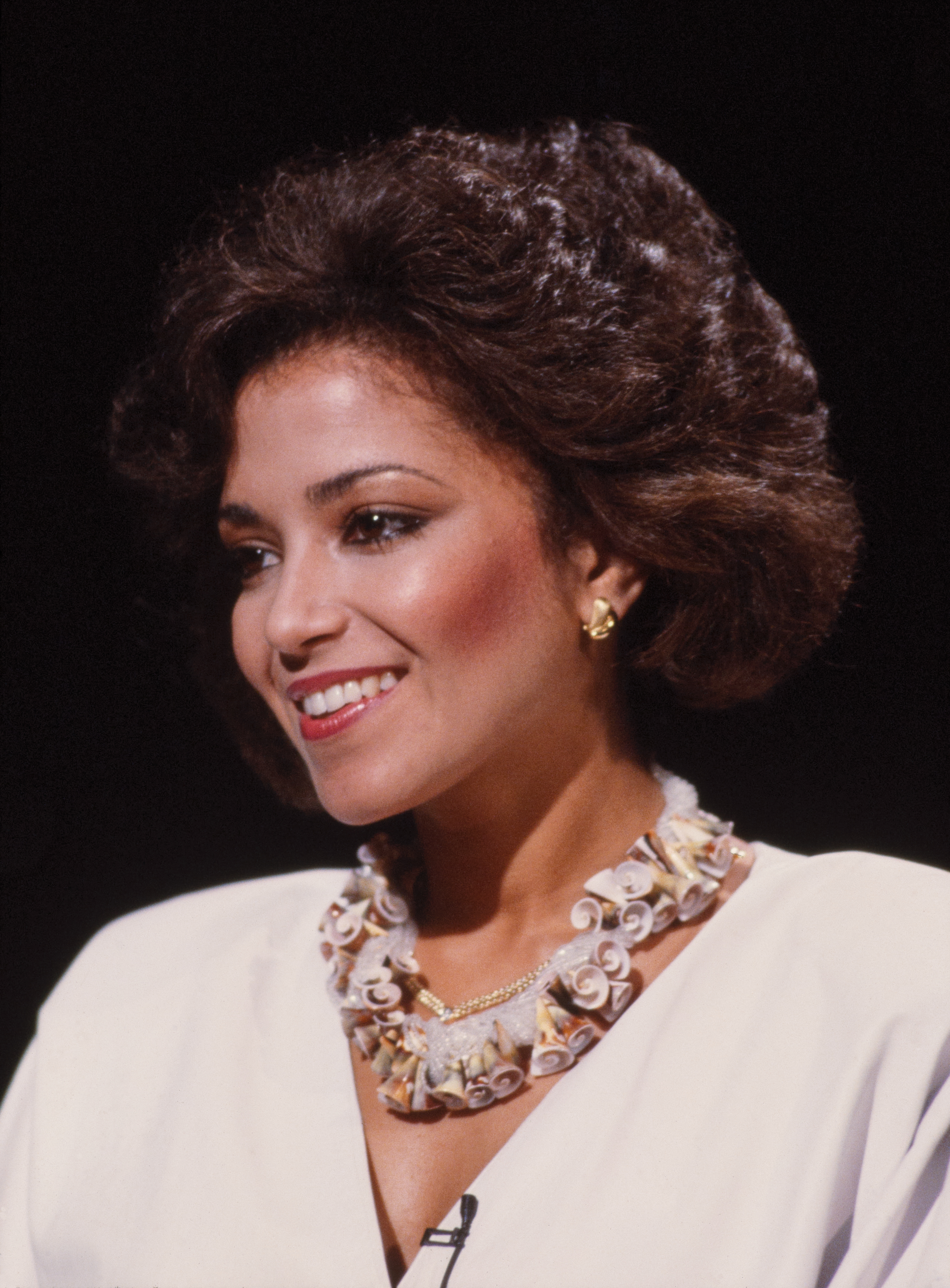
- Charles as Miss America, 1984
- Born: Suzette DeGaetano; March 2, 1963 (age 63); Philadelphia, Pennsylvania
- Other name: Sarah Bley
- Education: Temple University (BFA) Fordham University Master's Degree (in process)
- Occupations: Singer, actress
- Awards: Presidential Scholar 1981, Miss America

Suzette Charles (born Suzette DeGaetano; March 2, 1963) is an American singer, songwriter, performer and actress.

== Early life ==
Suzette DeGaetano "Charles" was born in Philadelphia, Pennsylvania and is an only child to her American mother (of French–West Indian descent) who was a school teacher and Italian father who was a salesman. She attended The Performing Arts School and as a high school graduate was awarded in 1981 a Presidential Scholar in the Arts. President Ronald Reagan awarded her and 141 others the Presidential medallion. Charles graduated Temple University with a Bachelor of Fine Arts and went on to being named Miss America 1984.

== Miss America 1984 ==
As Miss New Jersey, she competed in the Miss America 1984 pageant held in Atlantic City on September 17, 1983. Earlier in the week, she had won a Preliminary Talent Award for her performance of "Kiss Me in the Rain" by Barbra Streisand. While she originally placed as first runner-up, after the reigning Miss America Vanessa Williams was forced to resign, Suzette replaced her as the new Miss America. Charles was also the second Black woman to win the title after Williams.

== Career ==
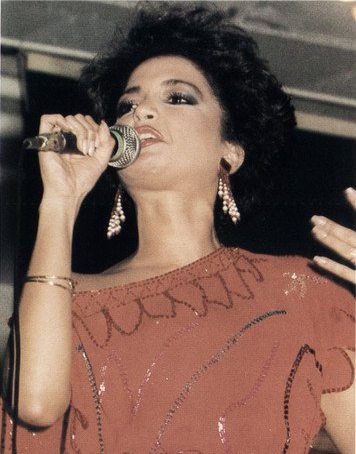
Charles performing in 1985

Charles worked from a young age in singing, modelling and acting on stage and television. She appears on the original soundtrack of film adaptation of the musical Hair. Charles was cast in the role of Crissy singing the song 'Frank Mills' but was ultimately cut from the film production. She acted on the ABC soap opera Loving, CBS television series Frank's Place and performed on This Morning, a British talk show. She hosted Arts-Break for Bravo and Screen Scene for BET She narrated the motion picture Beyond The Dream. She has appeared on stage singing with Stevie Wonder, Alan King, Joel Grey, Sammy Davis Jr., Bill Cosby and Frank Sinatra.

In 1993, Charles was signed to RCA Records and recorded with top British songwriters and producers Mike Stock and Pete Waterman, releasing her debut single, "Free To Love Again", in August of that year. The single peaked at number 58 on the UK Singles Chart. She recorded five more songs with Stock and Waterman that went unreleased at the time, these included; "After You're Gone", "Don't Stop (All The Love You Can Give)", "Every Time We Touch", "What The Eye Don't See" and "Just For A Minute". Her producers have included Mike Stock, Pete Waterman and David Foster who also signed her on his 143 Records Label. In the late 1980s, Barry Manilow and his management company Stiletto Management represented her on Capitol Records.

In 2025, she returned to the music industry, having recorded a self-titled album with Mike Stock, which includes re-recordings of the original six tracks recorded in 1993, and another five new songs written and produced by Stock. The album was released on May 22, 2026.

== Discography ==
- Suzette Charles (2026)

Awards and achievements
| Preceded by Vanessa L. Williams | Miss America; 1984 | Succeeded by Sharlene Wells |
| Preceded by Christina Shone | Miss New Jersey; 1983 | Succeeded by Patricia La Terra |
