= Deneen Graham =

American model and dance teacher

Deneen Zezell Graham Kerns is a dance teacher and pageant contestant from North Carolina. In 1983, she became the first African-American to win the Miss North Carolina beauty pageant; she remained the only African-American to have won the Miss North Carolina pageant until Alexandra Badgett was crowned in 2019.

== Personal life ==
Graham was born in North Wilkesboro, North Carolina. Her parents, Jean and Bobby Graham, were both educators in Wilkes County public schools. She entered the 1983 Miss North Carolina pageant at 19, as Miss Elkin Valley. North Wilkesboro held a Deneen Graham Day two weeks after she received the Miss North Carolina title. Vanessa Williams, winner of the Miss America 1984 title, has said that the Ku Klux Klan threatened to burn a cross on Graham's lawn after she won the North Carolina pageant.

In 1986, she graduated from the North Carolina School of the Arts with a Bachelor of Fine Arts degree in dance. She traveled to the Mediterranean, Far East, and Alaska with the Department of Defense Entertainment Tours, and toured the United States with the first national tour of the musical Heartstrings. She appeared in "Theatre of the Stars" productions of such musicals as Gentlemen Prefer Blondes, South Pacific, Hello, Dolly!, The Music Man, and The Will Rogers Follies. As a performer with the Miss Georgia pageant from 1988 to 1994, she served as co-choreographer and chief choreographer. She was also a member of the Atlanta Hawks Dance Team (Cheerleaders) during the 1994 season; she served as the assistant to the dance team choreographer. She was inducted into the Wilkes County Hall of Fame in 2016.

She is a member of the Dance Masters of America. Many of her students at Carol Walker Dance Academy have received the highest awards in regional and national competition. They were National Dance Champions in 2008.

== Pageants ==
- Miss Georgia pageant performer
- Miss North Carolina 1983
- Participant in Miss America 1984 pageant
