= SpringHill Suites =

Hotel chain of Marriott International

- Industry: Hotel
- Founded: 1997; 29 years ago
- Founder: J. Willard Marriott
- Number of locations: 470 (June 30, 2020)
- Area served: North America
- Parent: Marriott International
- Website: www.springhillsuites.com

SpringHill Suites is a brand operated by Marriott International offering suite hotels that target the upper-moderate lodging tier of the industry.

== History ==
Introduced in May 1997, the concept arose out of rebranding former Fairfield Suites properties, which featured an all-suite layout, into a brand of its own. The 34 properties (six managed and 28 franchised) in 1999 grew to 153 by 2006. The 300th was opened in 2013. As of June 30, 2020, it has 470 hotels with 55,595 rooms in addition to 187 hotels with 21,307 rooms in the pipeline.

== Accommodations ==
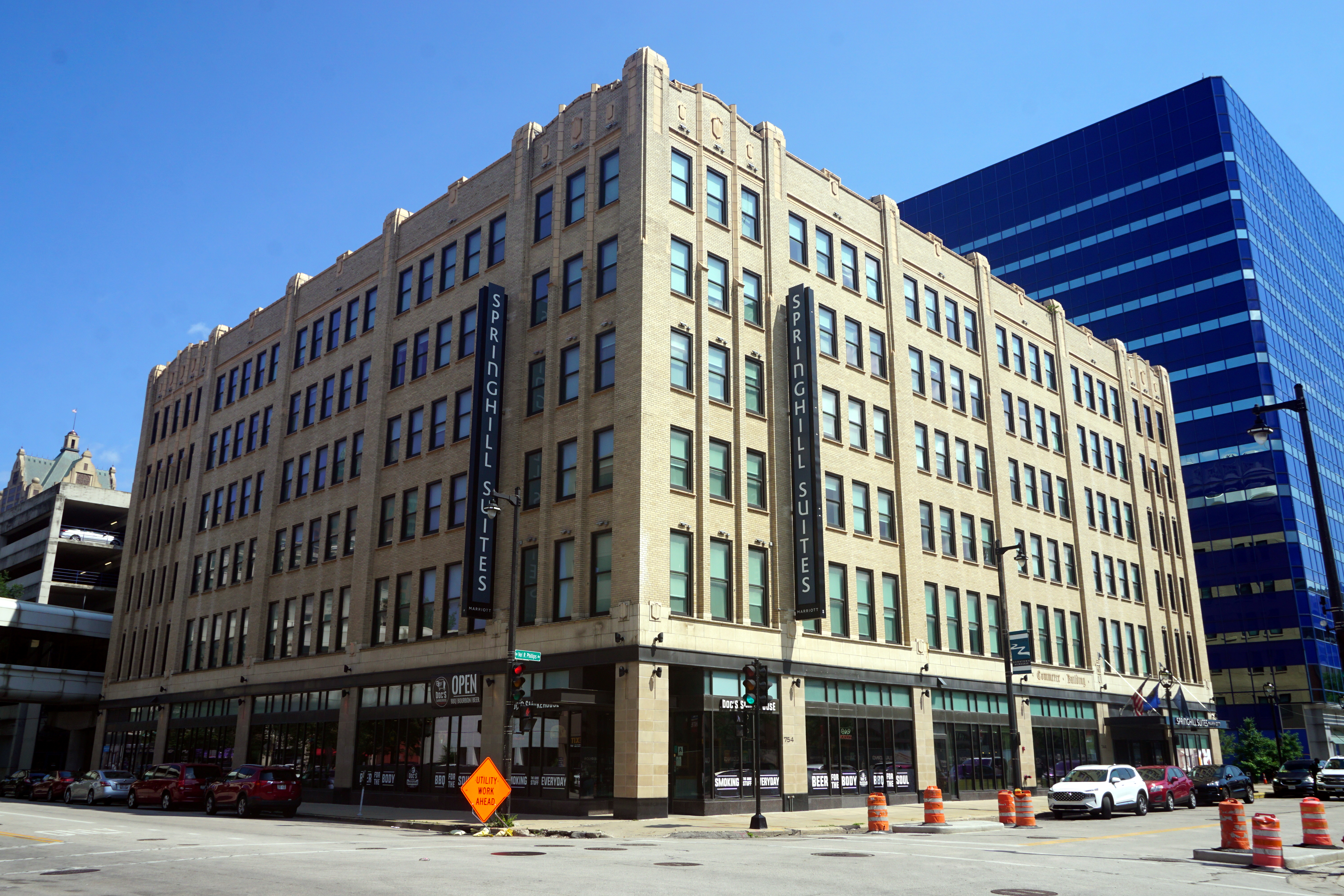
SpringHill Suites in Milwaukee

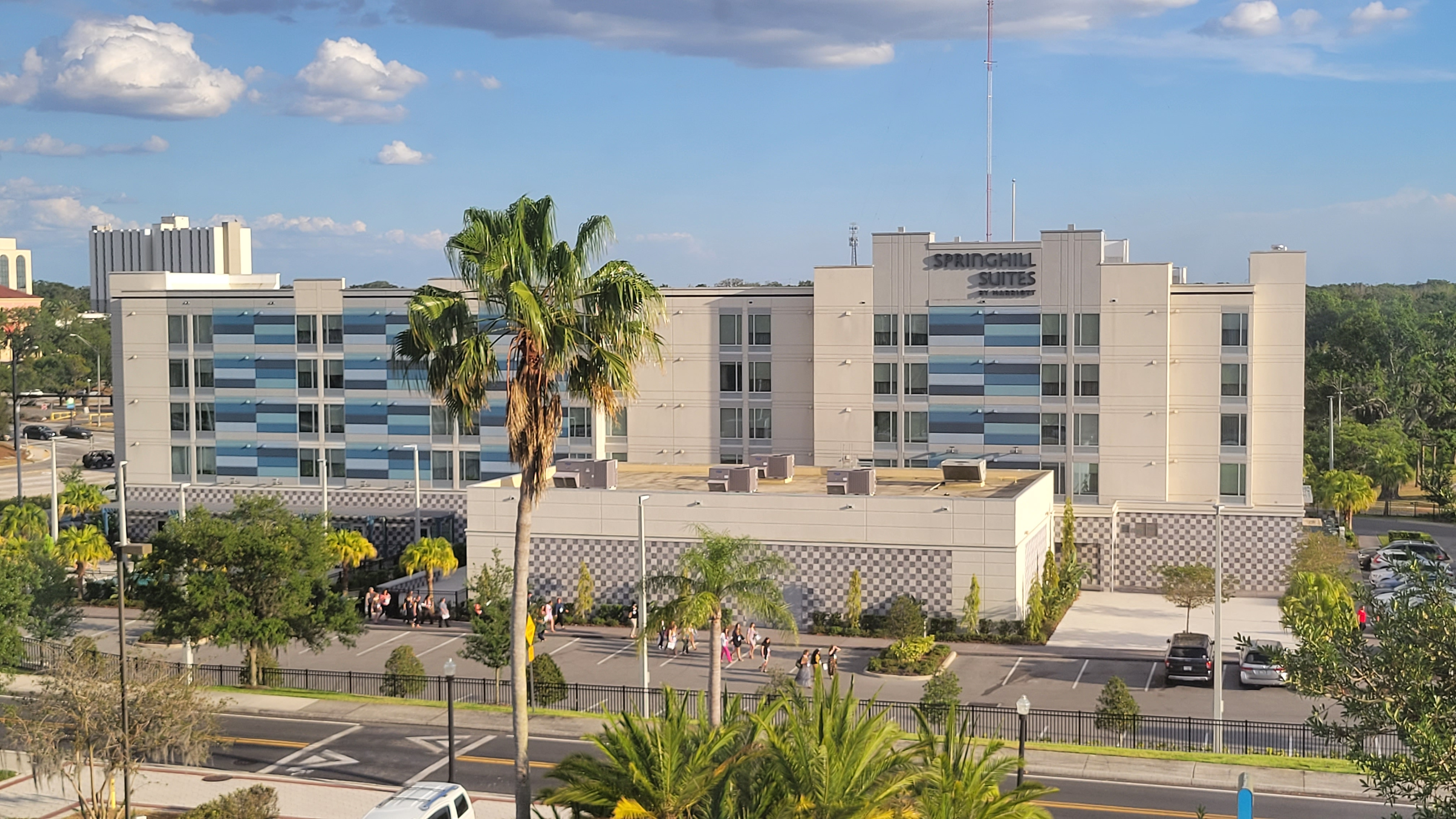
SpringHill Suites in Lakeland

=== Historical ===
Year	Acc.	US	Non-US	Total
2006	Properties			153
2006	Rooms			17,808
2007	Properties	176	1	177
2007	Rooms	20,445	124	20,569
2008	Properties	207	1	208
2008	Rooms	24,027	124	24,151
2009	Properties	255	1	256
2009	Rooms	29,846	124	29,970
2010	Properties	273	1	274
2010	Rooms	31,961	124	32,085
2011	Properties	285	2	287
2011	Rooms	33,466	299	33,765
2012	Properties	297	2	299
2012	Rooms	34,844	299	35,143
2013	Properties	306	2	308
2013	Rooms	35,888	299	36,187
2014	Properties	314	2	316
2014	Rooms	36,968	299	37,267

=== From 2015 ===
Year	Acc.	North America	Europe	Middle East & Africa	Asia & Pacific	Caribbean Latin America	Total
2015	Properties	336					336
2015	Rooms	39,750					39,750
2016	Properties	359					359
2016	Rooms	42,526					42,526
2017	Properties	388					388
2017	Rooms	45,946					45,946
2018	Properties	414					414
2018	Rooms	48,959					48,959
2019	Properties	456					456
2019	Rooms	54,033					54,033
2020	Properties	488					488
2020	Rooms	57,590					57,590
2021	Properties	512					512
2021	Rooms	60,617					60,617
2022	Properties	532					532
2022	Rooms	63,014					63,014
2023	Properties	547					547
2023	Rooms	64,774					64,774
