= Miss America 1984 =

57th Miss America pageant

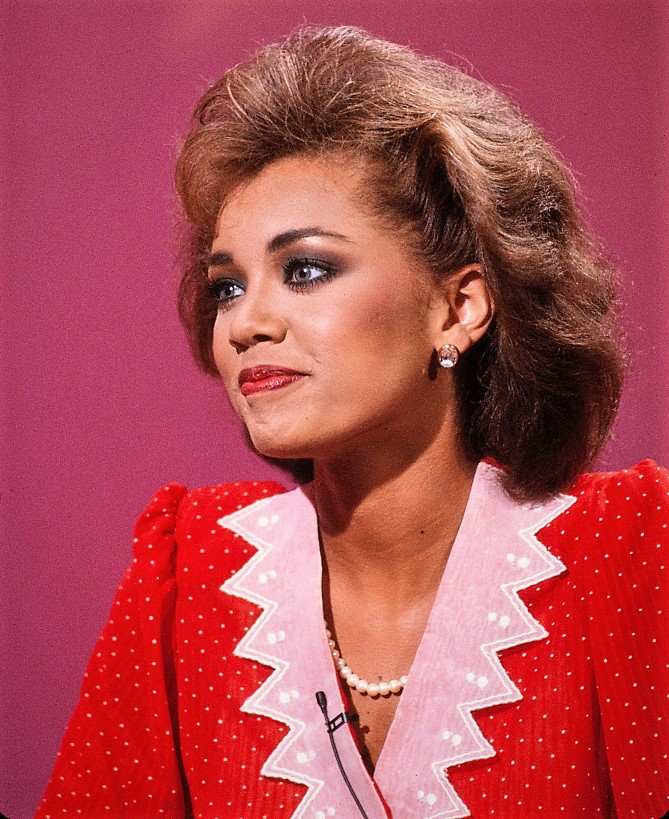
- Vanessa Williams in 1984
- Date: September 17, 1983
- Presenters: Gary Collins Susan Powell (Miss America 1981) Deanna Fogarty
- Venue: Boardwalk Hall, Atlantic City, New Jersey
- Broadcaster: NBC
- Winner: Vanessa Williams - September 17, 1983 – July 23, 1984 (resigned) Suzette Charles - July 23, 1984 – September 15, 1984 (succeeded); New York (Williams) New Jersey (Charles)

Miss America 1984, the 57th Miss America pageant, was held at the Boardwalk Hall in Atlantic City, New Jersey on September 17, 1983, on NBC Network. Miss America 1983, Debra Maffett (Miss California 1982) crowned her successor, Miss New York 1983, Vanessa Williams of Millwood, New York at the end of the nationally televised event. In July 1984, Williams was forced to resign over the unauthorized publication of nude photographs and was succeeded by first runner-up, Miss New Jersey Suzette Charles, who served as Miss America until September 15, 1984. Among the contestants who did not place among the ten finalists, Miss New Mexico 1983 Mai Shanley, eventually went on to win the Miss USA 1984 pageant on May 17, 1984.

== Overview ==
It began in the summer of 1982. I had finished my exams the first week of May at Syracuse University and came home to find a summer job. I saw an advertisement in a local newspaper reading "models wanted," so I called up and talked to Tom Chiapel, who was the photographer and part-owner of TEC studios. He said to come down for an interview ... When I returned later to pick up the proofs, Tom Chiapel indicated that he needed a makeup artist. He offered me an audition, so I came in and did a face. He decided to have me work for him as a makeup artist-receptionist ... I had worked there for a month and a half when Tom Chiapel mentioned several times that he'd like to shoot me in the nude. I had never posed nude and I was curious. I was 19 years old. I agreed. He assured me that none of the photographs would ever leave the studio. He assured me ... I trusted him not to do anything with the photographs. That was my error. I did not give my consent to him or Penthouse to ever have them published, used in any magazine or in any way. Nothing. I signed an application giving my height, weight, color of hair and my talents ... I never told anyone about the pictures, not even my parents. I did not think it was a concern. We had made an agreement they would never be published. I feel as if I were just a sacrificial lamb. The past just came up and kicked me. I felt betrayed and violated, like I had been raped.

— Vanessa Williams in 1984

During the preliminaries for the Miss America 1984 pageant, Vanessa Williams won "Preliminary Swimsuit" and "Preliminary Talent" (with a vocal performance of "Happy Days Are Here Again"). She was crowned Miss America 1984 on September 17, 1983 (becoming the first African American woman to win the title). Williams later commented that she was one of five minority contestants that year, noting that ballet dancer Deneen Graham "had already had a cross burned on her front yard because she was the first black Miss North Carolina [1983]." She also pointed out that "Suzette Charles was the first runner-up, and she was biracial. But when the press started, when I would go out on the - on the tour and do my appearances, and people would come up and say they never thought they'd see the day that it would happen; when people would want to shake my hand, and you'd see tears in their eyes, and they'd say, I never thought I'd see it in my lifetime - that's when, you know, it was definitely a very special honor." Williams' reign as Miss America saw challenges and controversies, however. For the first time in pageant history, a reigning Miss America was the target of death threats and hate mail. In addition, ten months into her reign as Miss America, Williams received an anonymous phone call stating nude photos of her (taken before her pageant days) would be published in Penthouse. The publication of these photos ultimately led to her resignation as Miss America.

Williams believed the photographs were private and had been destroyed; she claims she never signed a release permitting the photos to be used. The black-and-white photos dated back to 1982 (the year before she won the Miss America Pageant), when she worked as an assistant and makeup artist for Mount Kisco, New York photographer Tom Chiapel. According to Williams, Chiapel said that "he had a concept of having two models pose nude for silhouettes. Basically to make different shapes and forms. The light would be behind the models. I was reluctant, but since he assured me that I would be the only one to see them and I would not be identifiable in the photographs, I agreed. He had also gotten another model to agree to this." Hugh Hefner, the publisher of Playboy, was initially offered the photos, but turned them down, stating: "The single victim in all of this was the young woman herself, whose right to make this decision was taken away from her. If she wanted to make this kind of statement, that would be her business, but the statement wasn't made by her." Penthouse published the photos without her permission in 1984, however, in what the PBS documentary Miss America described as "the most successful issue of Penthouse magazine ever printed, netting publisher Bob Guccione a windfall profit of $14 million."

According to Essence magazine, Williams "was forced to resign from her title as she faced public shaming and bullying from the public at large." Williams herself later described these events as "the betrayal, and the humiliation, that happened to me on a grand scale." She also noted that her parents experienced "an incredible amount of shame and humiliation" and were equally the subject of harassment at the time. After being given 72 hours to make a decision, Williams formally announced her decision to resign in a press conference on July 23, 1984 and the title subsequently went to the first runner-up, Miss New Jersey Suzette Charles (who served out the final seven weeks of Williams' reign). On September 7, 1984, Williams filed a $500 million lawsuit against Chiapel and Guccione. She eventually dropped the suit a year later, explaining that she wanted to put the scandal behind her and move on.

Williams returned to the Miss America stage on September 13, 2015, for the Miss America 2016 pageant, when she served as head judge and performed "Oh How the Years Go By." The pageant began with then-Miss America CEO Sam Haskell issuing an apology to Williams, telling her that although "none of us currently in the organization were involved then, on behalf of today's organization, I want to apologize to you and to your mother, Miss Helen Williams. I want to apologize for anything that was said or done that made you feel any less the Miss America you are and the Miss America you always will be."

Suzette Charles (Williams' replacement) said in an interview with Inside Edition that she was perplexed over the apology and suggested that it was given for the purpose of ratings. Williams also commented on the events surrounding her return, stating in an interview with ABC News reporter Robin Roberts that "there's a lot of people who feel I should return, so the people who harbor the resentment I understand it but realize that all of those people that were part of the old guard are no longer there."

== Results ==
=== Placements ===
Placement	Contestant
Miss America 1984	New York – Vanessa Williams (resigned – September 1983-July 1984)
1st Runner-Up	New Jersey – Suzette Charles (succeeded – July 1984-September 1984)
2nd Runner-Up	Alabama – Pam Battles
3rd Runner-Up	Mississippi – Wanda Geddie
4th Runner-Up	Ohio – Pamela Rigas
Top 10	Florida – Kim Boyce; Kentucky – Lynn Thompson; Missouri – Barbara Webster; Nebraska – Kristin Lowenberg; Texas – Dana Rogers

=== Preliminary awards ===
Awards	Contestant
Lifestyle and Fitness	Mississippi - Wanda Geddie; (New York (state)) New York - Vanessa Williams; Ohio - Pamela Rigas
Talent	Missouri - Barbara Webster; New Jersey - Suzette Charles; (New York (state)) New York - Vanessa Williams

==== Non-finalist awards ====
Awards	Contestant
Talent	Arkansas - Regina Hopper; Idaho - Elaine Pack; Kansas - Laura Lynn Waters; Louisiana - Miriam Gauthier; Massachusetts - Holly Mayer; Oregon - Stephanie Jill Wymer; Tennessee - Moira Alice Kaye; Utah - Lynn Lambert

== Contestants ==
State	Name	Hometown	Age	Talent	Placement	Special Awards	Notes
Alabama	Pam Battles	Muscle Shoals	21	Piano, Medley of George Gershwin	2nd runner-up		
Alaska	Jennifer Smith	Soldotna	19	Vocal, "Le Jazz Hot!" from Victor/Victoria			
Arizona	Jennifer Nichols	Tempe	22	Classical Vocal, "Glitter and Be Gay"			
Arkansas	Regina Hopper	Springdale	24	Popular Vocal, "You're Gonna Hear from Me"		Non-finalist Talent Award	Formerly on the Miss America Board of Directors
California	Shari Moskau	Mission Viejo	19	Popular Vocal, "Greatest Love of All"			
Colorado	Melanie Scott	Littleton	21	Jazz Acrobatic Dance, "Junkaroo Holiday"			
Connecticut	Dakeita Vanderburg	Westport	25	Popular Vocal, "I Can See It"			
Delaware	Tammy Renee Copeland	Newark	21	Vocal, "Cry Me a River"			
Florida	Kim Boyce	Bradenton	22	Popular Vocal, "Rainbow Connection" & "Over the Rainbow"	Top 10		
(Georgia (U.S. state)) Georgia	Tammy Fulwider	Columbus	24	Tap Dance/Vocal, "42nd Street"			
Hawaii	Wendy Sue Nelson	Kihei	21	Vocal, "Hit Me with a Hot Note" from Sophisticated Ladies			
Idaho	Elaine Pack	Rexburg	20	Harp, "Spanish Fantasy"		Non-finalist Talent Award	
Illinois	Rebecca Bush	Chicago	24	Vocal, "It's My Turn"			Played Detective Katie Grant on Jake and the Fatman
Indiana	Teri Schultz	Bloomington	21	Ballet, "Sylvia"			
Iowa	Karri Nussle	Des Moines	19	Vocal, "Minute Waltz"			
Kansas	Laura Lynn Watters	Colby	22	Trumpet Medley, "Sugar Blues" & "Woodchopper's Ball"		Non-finalist Talent Award	
Kentucky	Lynn Whitney Thompson	Lexington	24	Popular Vocal, "Yesterday When I Was Young"	Top 10		
Louisiana	Miriam Gauthier	Shreveport	19	Piano, "Toccata" by Antonio Tauriello		Non-finalist Talent Award	
Maine	Brenda Theriault	Presque Isle	22	Vocal, "Won't You Come Home Bill Bailey"			
Maryland	Amy Elizabeth Keys	Lanham	26	Popular Vocal, "I'll Never Love This Way Again"			
Massachusetts	Holly Mayer	Brookline	26	Dance/Baton Twirling, Music from Gypsy: A Musical Fable		Non-finalist Talent Award	Previously National Sweetheart 1982 Mother of Miss New York's Outstanding Teen 2011 and Miss New York 2019, Lauren Molella Sister-in-law of Miss New York 1989, Lisa Molella
Michigan	Denise Gehman	Waterford	20	Vocal Medley, "Love is a Many-Splendored Thing" & "Show Me" from My Fair Lady			
Minnesota	Vicki Plaster	St. Paul	23	Vocal Medley, "Just You Wait" & "I Could Have Danced All Night" from My Fair Lady			Mother of Miss Minnesota 2019, Kathryn Kueppers
Mississippi	Wanda Gayle Geddie	Hattiesburg	24	Vocal, "More Than You Know"	3rd runner-up	Preliminary Lifestyle & Fitness Award	
Missouri	Barbara Ann Webster	Jefferson City	21	Violin Medley, "Listen to the Mocking Bird" & "Orange Blossom Special"	Top 10	Preliminary Talent Award	Later Miss Missouri USA 1986
Montana	Laurie Nelson	Billings	19	Classical Piano, L'isle joyeuse by Claude Debussy			
Nebraska	Kristin Leigh Lowenburg	Kearney	20	Jazz Dance, "What a Feeling"	Top 10		
Nevada	Kim Pacini	Incline Village	24	Vocal, "You're the Top"			
New Hampshire	Monica Jean Rastallis	Newport	22	Ballet, Theme from Summer of '42			
New Jersey	Suzette Charles	Mays Landing	20	Popular Vocal, "Kiss Me in the Rain"	1st runner-up	Preliminary Talent Award	Named Miss America in July 1984 when Vanessa Williams relinquished title
New Mexico	Mai Shanley	Alamogordo	20	Vocal, "I Feel Pretty" from West Side Story			Later Miss New Mexico USA 1984 Crowned Miss USA 1984 Top 10 at Miss Universe 1984
(New York (state)) New York	Vanessa Williams	Millwood	20	Popular Vocal, "Happy Days are Here Again"	Winner	Preliminary Lifestyle & Fitness Award Preliminary Talent Award	First African American Miss America Resigned on July 23, 1984, after Penthouse was to publish nude photos of Williams without her consent
North Carolina	Deneen Graham	North Wilkesboro	19	Jazz Dance, "Sing, Sing, Sing"			First African American Miss North Carolina
North Dakota	Phyllis Hankey	Park River	22	Vocal, "If You Believe" from The Wiz			
Ohio	Pamela Helean Rigas	Canfield	22	Vocal/Dance, "Shine it On"	4th runner-up	Preliminary Lifestyle & Fitness Award	Previously Ohio's Junior Miss 1978 Previously Miss Alabama USA 1980 3rd runner-up at Miss USA 1980
Oklahoma	Trelynda Kerr	Moore	21	Country Vocal Medley, "Stand by Your Man"			
Oregon	Stephanie "Jill" Wymer	Sutherlin	22	Popular Vocal, "Out Here on My Own" from Fame		Non-finalist Talent Award	
Pennsylvania	Jennifer Eshelman	Hegins	23	Classical Vocal, "Adele's Laughing Song" from Die Fledermaus			
Rhode Island	Pamela Hoff	Providence	21	Vocal, "For Once in My Life"			
South Carolina	Dalia Mercedes Garcia	Columbia	21	Vocal, "Don't Cry for Me Argentina"			
South Dakota	LaRonda Lundin	Revillo	20	Classical Piano, "Polichinelle" by Sergei Rachmaninoff			
Tennessee	Moira Alice Kaye	Oak Ridge	23	Vocal, "Memory" from Cats		Non-finalist Talent Award	
Texas	Dana Rogers	Boerne	22	Vocal, "An American Trilogy"	Top 10		Mother of Miss Nevada's Outstanding Teen 2019, Molly Martin
Utah	Lynn Lambert	Provo	21	Classical Piano, "Concerto No. 2, 3rd Movement" by Rachmaninoff		Non-finalist Talent Award	
Vermont	Juliet Lambert	Middlebury	19	Vocal, "Don't Rain on My Parade"			
Virginia	Lisa Aliff	Roanoke	23	Vocal & Dance, "Manhattan" & "Broadway Rhythm"			
(Washington (state)) Washington	Jennifer Havlin	Bellingham	25	Character Ballet, "On Golden Pond"			
West Virginia	Andrea Lynn Patrick	Morgantown	23	Tap Dance, "Malagueña" & "España cañí"			Previously Miss Pennsylvania USA 1980
Wisconsin	Wendy Lynn Wagner	Menomonie / Des Plaines Illinois	22	Vocal, "Mira" from Carnival!			
Wyoming	Heather Wallace	Cheyenne	21	Vocal, "New York, New York"			

== See also ==
- Vanessa Williams and Miss America
