= Waterford High School (Connecticut) =

Location
- 20 Rope Ferry Road; Waterford, Connecticut 06385; United States
- Coordinates: 41°20′27″N 72°7′42″W

Information
- School type: Public
- School district: Waterford Public Schools
- CEEB code: 070873
- Principal: Kirk Samuelson
- Grades: 9-12
- Enrollment: 713 (2023-2024)
- Campus size: 46 acres (190,000 m^{2})
- Campus type: Suburban
- Colors: Royal blue and white
- Fight song: Onward Lancers
- Athletics conference: Eastern Connecticut Conference
- Mascot: Lancer
- Rival: East Lyme High School
- Publication: The Round Table literary magazine
- Newspaper: The Lancelot
- Yearbook: Excalibur
- Website: whs.waterfordschools.org

Waterford High School is a public high school in Waterford, Connecticut, United States.

== History ==
Waterford's first high school was constructed in 1956, and had 24 rooms. It was first occupied in January 1957 with 612 students in grades 7-9. The school became a four-year 9-12 school in 1959. The first graduating class of 161 students was in 1960.

The project to build a new high school and to re-renovate the field house began in 2010 with a budget of $72 million.

== Campus ==
The campus has had a growth in facilities in 1956, 1959, 1962, 1968, 1982 and 2010.

The construction of a new building began in spring 2010 and the new high school officially opened for classes on Monday, April 8, 2013. The original high school was scheduled for demolition during summer 2013.

This is the second high school built in Waterford.

== Athletics ==
Waterford High School belongs to the Eastern Connecticut Conference. East Lyme High School has traditionally been Waterford’s rival in sports. The Waterford sports teams are known as the Lancers and compete in:

- American football (boys)
- Baseball (boys)
- Basketball (boys)
- Basketball (girls)
- Cross country (boys and girls)
- Fencing - foil and épée (boys and girls)
  - State Champion women's Foil 2020 State Champion Women's Epee 2022, 2023
- Field hockey (girls)
- Golf (boys and girls)
- Lacrosse (boys and girls)
- Soccer (boys and girls)
- Softball (girls)
- Swimming (boys and girls)
- Tennis (boys and girls)
- Track and field (boys and girls)
- Volleyball (girls)
- Wrestling (boys)
- Cheerleading

The Lancers have won 11 CIAC state championships in baseball; more than any other high school in the state.

Wins in CIAC State Championships
Sport	Class	Year(s)
Baseball	M	1968, 1988, 1998, 2000, 2002, 2005, 2017
Baseball	L	1976, 1979, 1981, 2019
Basketball (boys)	M	2012
Basketball (boys)	III	2018
Basketball (boys)	II	2019
Cheer	M	2020 (Co-champions with Wolcott)
Cheer	L	2005, 2008
Cheer	Coed	2010
Cross country (boys)	M	1960, 1988
Golf (boys)	III	2000, 2001
Golf (boys)	II	1980, 1981
Gymnastics (girls)	M	2025 (Partnered with Ledyard and St. Bernard)
Gymnastics (girls)	L	2009 (Partnered with Fitch)
Gymnastics (girls)	Open	2009 (Partnered with Fitch)
Soccer (girls)	M	2013
Softball	M	1983, 2013, 2019
Softball	L	2009, 2010
Track and field (outdoor, boys)	M	1989
Track and field (outdoor, girls)	M	1990
Volleyball (girls)	M	2015
Wrestling	S	1985
Wrestling	M	2005, 2009

== Notable alumni ==
- Valerie Azlynn (1998), actress
- Veronica Ballestrini, country singer
- Tanisha Brito (1998), Miss Connecticut (2002)
- Michael Burrows, professional baseball player
- Geoffrey S. Fletcher, writer
- Georgia Lee (1994), filmmaker and writer for television
- Ken Liu (1994), science fiction author
- Merv Mosely, football player
- Katie Schoepfer, professional soccer player
- Brennan Ward, mixed martial arts fighter
