= Piano Nobile =

Commercial art gallery in London

Coordinates: 51.5100°N 0.2105°W

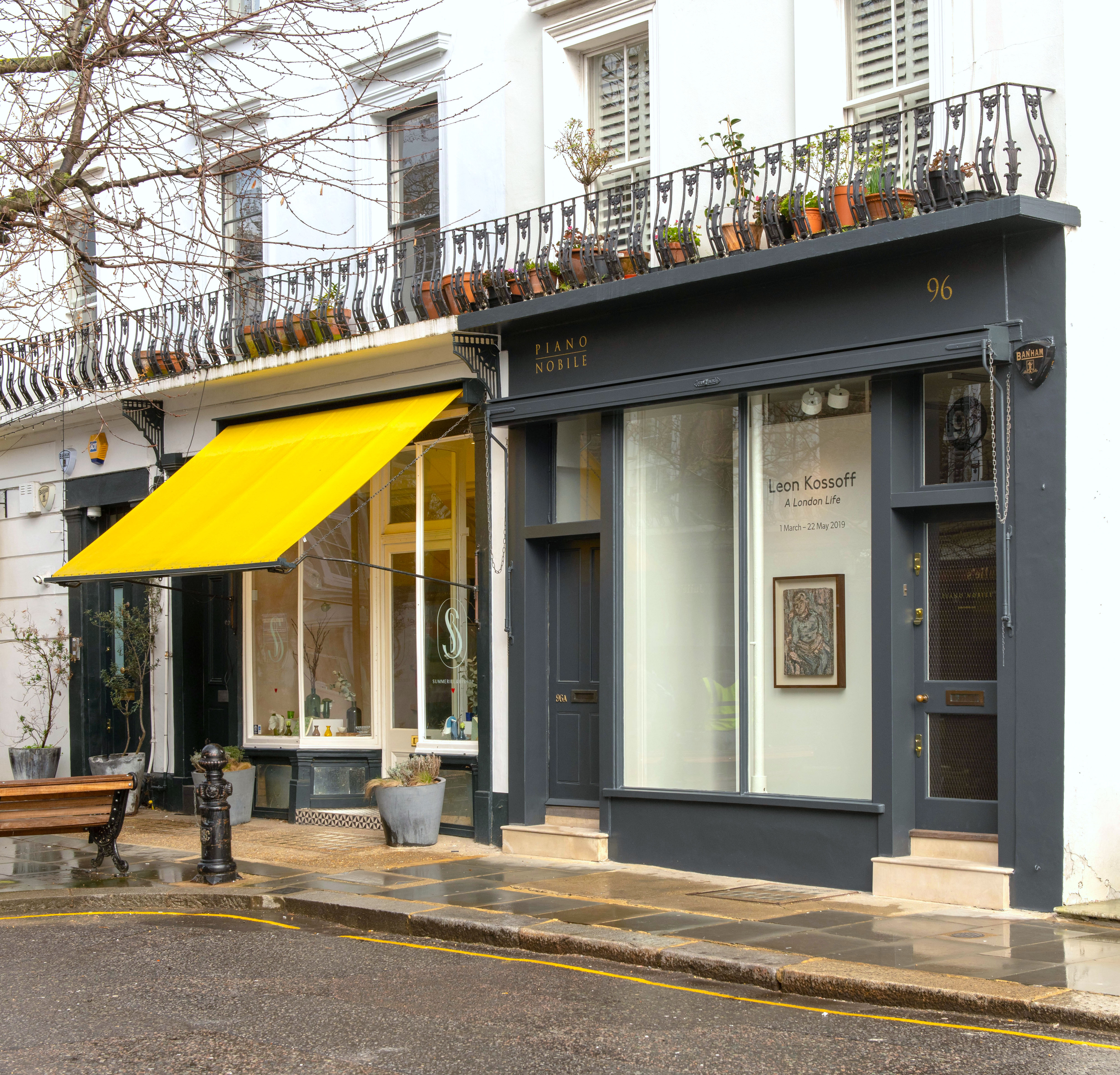
Piano Nobile's gallery at 96 Portland Road, London.

Piano Nobile is a commercial art gallery in London, England, specialising in twentieth-century British art. It was established by Dr Robert Travers at premises in Richmond in 1985. In 2000, the gallery moved to its current address at 129 Portland Road, London. In 2019, an additional gallery space was acquired at 96 Portland Road. Between 2008 and 2019, the gallery also had an exhibition space at Kings Place in King’s Cross.

The gallery is a member of the Society of London Art Dealers.

Piano Nobile is the registered company name of Robert Travers (Works of Art) Ltd.. The company has also previously traded as Piano Nobile Fine Paintings.

== Museum partners ==
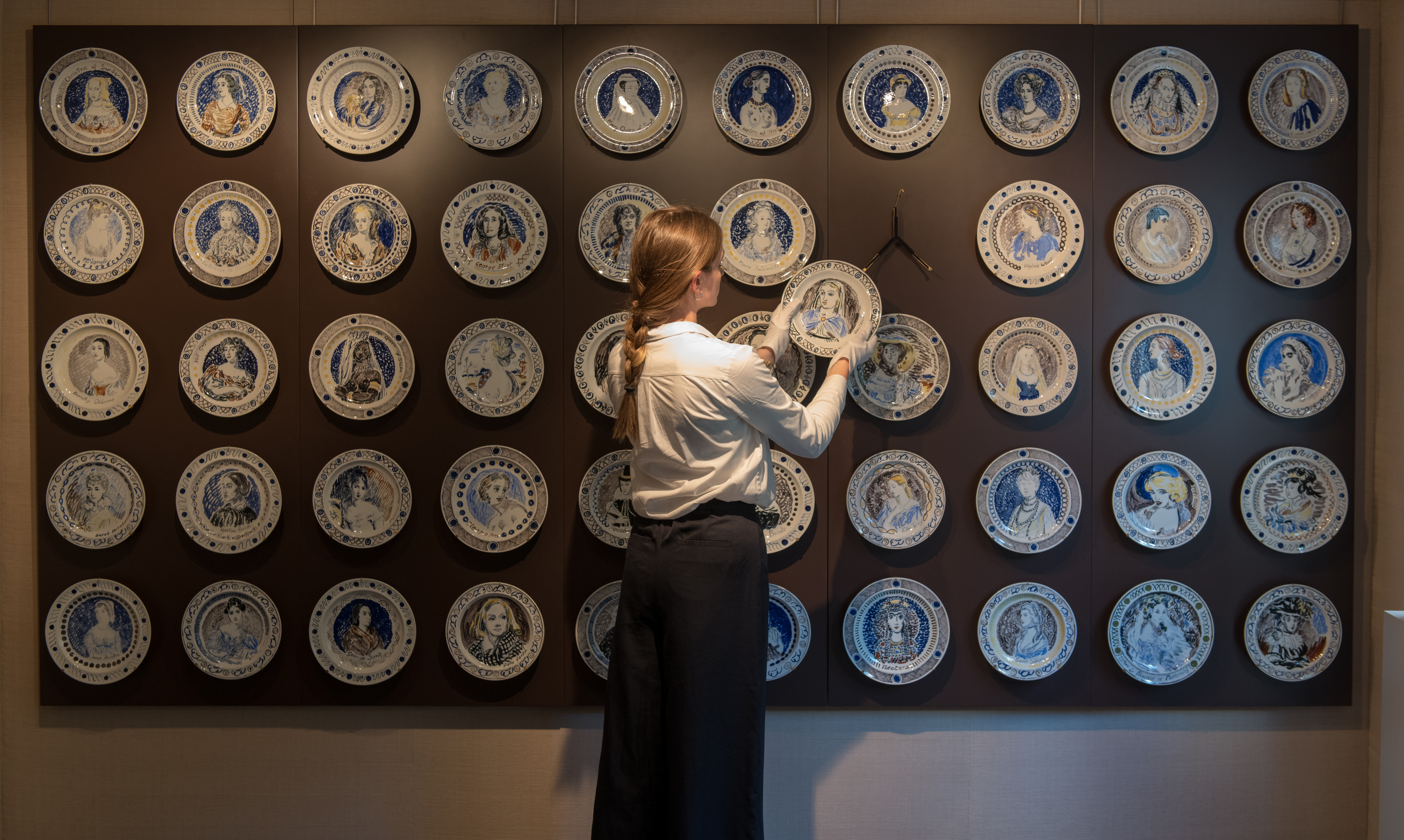
The Famous Women Dinner Service by Vanessa Bell and Duncan Grant on display at Piano Nobile in 2018.

Piano Nobile has sold and loaned works to public collections in the UK and abroad. In 2018, Charleston Farmhouse purchased from Piano Nobile the Famous Women Dinner Service by Vanessa Bell and Duncan Grant. The service was commissioned by Kenneth Clark, late director of the National Gallery and presenter of the 1969 television series Civilisation. Depicting famous women from history and contemporary life, the set includes portraits of queens, writers, performers, and other known figures including two plates featuring the artists themselves.

Re-discovery of the plates received interest from the academic community. The art historian Hana Leaper published an article about the dinner service in British Art Studies, the online journal of the Paul Mellon Centre for Studies in British Art. In May 2018, the gallery's director Dr Robert Travers spoke about the plates on BBC Radio 4's programme Front Row with novelist Ali Smith and Charleston curator Darren Clarke. The acquisition of the dinner service was funded by grants from the National Heritage Memorial Fund and the Art Fund and "donations from a circle remarkable women".

In 2012, the National Gallery of Ireland (NGI) acquired from Piano Nobile Flanders Fields (1962) by William Crozier. (Piano Nobile represents work from the Crozier Estate up to 1979.) This painting was one of 150 works which the NGI acquired during an extended closure between 2011 and 2017, when the gallery underwent an extensive refurbishment. In 2018, the National Gallery of Ireland also purchased thirty-five works on paper by Crozier.

Piano Nobile regularly loans works to museum exhibitions. In 2018, Tate Britain’s All Too Human exhibition included Walter Sickert’s painting The Studio: The Painting of a Nude, loaned by Piano Nobile. In 2018, a BP Spotlight display at Tate Britain about Mark Gertler included The Pond, Garsington (1916), the loan of which was facilitated by Piano Nobile. Also in 2018, the touring exhibition Virginia Woolf: An Exhibition Inspired by her Writings included a work by Gluck, Portrait of Miss E.M. Craig, which was loaned through Piano Nobile. In 2019, the National Gallery of Modern Art’s exhibition Cut and Paste included Duncan Grant’s Still Life with Fruit and Coffee-pot (1916) and Vanessa Bell’s collage portrait of Molly MacCarthy (1914), both of which were loaned through Piano Nobile.

== Exhibitions ==
Since the mid-2010s, Piano Nobile has held around two monographic loan exhibitions a year. Examples include exhibitions of work by Mark Gertler (2012), Paul Nash (2014), John Armstrong (2015), William Coldstream and Euan Uglow (2016), Peter Coker (2017), David Bomberg and Leslie Marr (2017), Vanessa Bell and Duncan Grant (2018), Leon Kossoff (2019), Craigie Aitchison (2019), and Ben Nicholson (2020). These exhibitions have sometimes included museum loans. The exhibition Ben Nicholson: Distant Planes included works from the British Council Collection, Southampton City Art Gallery and Pallant House Gallery.

Piano Nobile's exhibitions have been reviewed by art critics including Martin Gayford, Jackie Wullschlager, and Jonathan Jones. The 2019 exhibition Leon Kossoff: A London Life, the last dedicated exhibition of Kossoff’s work in his lifetime, was covered in The Spectator, The Daily Telegraph, and The Financial Times. Writing in The Spectator on 20 April 2019, Martin Gayford said that the exhibition was "especially welcome" and "highly recommended".

The private view of Leon Kossoff: A London Life was attended by the artist himself, as well as his peers the painters Frank Auerbach and Joe Tilson. Auerbach recounted the event in an interview with Alma Zevi in May 2019. "It was a moving opening for me, because if you’d have gone to St Martin’s School of Art in 1948-1949, you would have seen Leon Kossoff, Joe Tilson and myself working in a room. Joe had just come out of the RAF, Leon had just come out of the Jewish Brigade, I’d just come, more or less, from school. It seemed totally impossible for people with no support and no background to become painters – it was hopeless. And there we were, 70 years later, all in the same room. We actually lived our dream. All of us very old, but we’d actually, against all odds, become painters."

== Publications ==
Since 1994, Piano Nobile has published books under the imprint Piano Nobile Publications. This is an in-house publishing operation which mainly publishes the gallery’s exhibition catalogues. The publisher’s distributor is Casemate.

Piano Nobile Publications has published work by various different authors. Its books have included essays by the culinary writer Susan Campbell, the former editor of The Burlington Magazine Richard Shone, the art historians Frances Spalding and Lee Beard, the curators Chris Stephens and Sarah MacDougall, and the art writer David Boyd Haycock.

In 2018, the large-scale monograph From Omega to Charleston: The Art of Vanessa Bell and Duncan Grant was published by Piano Nobile Publications in partnership with the Paul Mellon Centre for Studies in British Art.

The imprint has occasionally sponsored academic research. The Nobile Index Series, published in association with the University of Bristol, presented original research about recent sale prices at auction for work by Walter Sickert, David Bomberg, L.S. Lowry, Stanley Spencer, Francis Bacon and Lucian Freud.

In 2020, Leon Kossoff: A London Life was long-listed for the William M.B. Berger Prize for British Art History.

== The Ruth Borchard Collection ==
Shortly after Ruth Borchard’s death in 2000, her collection of self-portraiture came to be managed by Piano Nobile. The collection includes one-hundred paintings by British and British-based artists, executed between 1958 and 1971. It is still owned by Ruth Borchard’s descendants, while Piano Nobile is responsible for storing, promoting, exhibiting and loaning out the collection on the family’s behalf. A catalogue of the collection, Face to Face: British Self-Portraits in the Twentieth Century, was written by Philip Vann and published in 2004.

The collection does not have a permanent exhibition space. Since 2011, a biennial exhibition of paintings from the collection has been held at Piano Nobile’s Kings Place gallery and at various UK museums, including Pallant House Gallery, Chichester, in 2014, and Manx National Heritage, Isle of Man, in 2020-21. This biennial exhibition alternates with the Ruth Borchard Self-Portrait Prize, which encourages contemporary artists to practice self-portraiture. The Prize's institutional partners to date have included the Courtauld Institute of Art, ArtUK, Manx National Heritage, the charity Outside In, the Jerwood Foundation, Pallant House Gallery and The Lightbox, Woking.

Paintings from the collection are frequently loaned out to museum exhibitions. The self-portrait by William Gear was on loan to the Towner Gallery, Eastbourne, in 2015-16. The self-portrait by Ithell Colquhoun was on loan to Penlee House Museum and Gallery in 2016. The self-portrait by Euan Uglow was on loan to Museum MORE, Gorssel, in 2019.
