= Ray Hutchison =

Ray Hutchison may refer to:

- Ray Hutchison (cricketer) (born 1944), New Zealander cricketer and umpire
- Ray Hutchison (politician) (1932–2014), American politician

== See also ==
- Eugene Raymond Hutchinson (1880–1957), American photographer
- R. C. Hutchinson (Ray Coryton Hutchinson, 1907–1975), British novelist
