= Miss America 1935 =

- Date: September 7, 1935
- Presenters: King Neptune
- Venue: Steel Pier, Atlantic City, New Jersey
- Entrants: 53
- Placements: 14
- Winner: Henrietta Leaver; Pittsburgh

Miss America 1935, the ninth Miss America pageant, was held at the Steel Pier in Atlantic City, New Jersey on Saturday, September 7, 1935, following a one-year hiatus. Upon arrival in Atlantic City, contestants were strongly encouraged to exhibit some form of talent during the pageant, which was a first for the pageant. Aside from Henrietta Leaver, Miss Pittsburgh winning the Miss America crown, entrants from Pennsylvania placed as three of the nine semi-finalists.

Judges included: Louis St. John (president of the Atlantic City Chamber of Commerce), Nils Granlund (of New York), Vincent Trotta (art director at Paramount Pictures), Elias Goldensky (photographer in Philadelphia), Walter Thornton, Willard Van der Veer (Academy Award winner for cinematography), and Giuseppe Donato (sculptor).

== Results ==
=== Placements ===
Placement	Contestant
Miss America 1935	Pittsburgh – Henrietta Leaver
1st Runner-Up	Missouri – Edna Smith
2nd Runner-Up	Kentucky – Jeane Megerle
Top 12	Baltimore – Frances Stine; Burlington – Mary Dillinger; California – Virginia Hope Donham; District of Columbia – Helen Loyce Clum; Florida – Elizabeth Hull; New Haven – Ruth Stuart Rubin; New York – Vera Hall; Norristown – Helen Keaser; New Jersey – Libby Koehler; Philadelphia – Jean Kathryn McCool; West Philadelphia – Lenora Pollock

== Contestants ==
Location	Name	Hometown	Age	Talent	Placement	Awards
Atlanta	LaRue Wilson	Atlanta				
Baltimore	Frances Stine	Baltimore			Top 12	
Birmingham	Adelynn Owen	Birmingham				
Bloomfield	Mildred Hughes					
Bridgeport, CT	Sonia Banks	Bridgeport				
Bridgeport, PA	Loretta Gale Tarle	Bridgeport				
Bridgeton	Geraldine Hester	Bridgeton				
Brooklyn	Grace Travis	Brooklyn		Piano		
Burlington	Mary Dillinger	Burlington		Vocal, "Every Little Moment"	Top 12	
California	Virginia Donham	San Francisco		Vocal, "Chlo-e" & "I Ain't Got Nobody"	Top 12	
Camden	Lena Melamed	Camden				
Cleveland	Eleanore Papin	Cleveland				
Cincinnati	Beatrice Pfeiffer	Cincinnati		Vocal		
Connecticut	Margaretta Kling	New Haven				Preliminary Swimsuit Award
Conshohocken	Helen Rita Skelly	Conshohocken				
Delaware County	Florence Carman	Upper Darby				
Des Moines	Connie Rosefield	Des Moines	18			
(Washington, D.C.) District of Columbia	Helen Clum		18	Vocal & Dance, "Every Day I'll In Love With You"	Top 12	
Florida	Elizabeth Hull	Plant City		Vocal Medley, "East of the Sun" & "When I Grow too Old to Dream"	Top 12	
Greater Hartford	Veronica Turosky					
(Hartford, Connecticut) Hartford	Margaret Holmes	Hartford				
Hillside	Dorothy Wainwright	Hillside				
Kentucky	Jean Megerle	Fort Thomas	18	Vocal/Acrobatic Dance, "I'll Never Say Never Again"	2nd runner-up	
Lake Hopatcong	Ann Golden					
Leominster	Rita Mae King	Leominster				
Maine	Edith Lucresa Smith					
Mayfair	Margie Godwin	Philadelphia				
Minnesota	Mildred Barrett	Marshall				
Mississippi	LeFrance Boyett	Sumner				
Missouri	Edna Smith	Fayette	19	Piano/Vocal, "Prelude No. 20" by Chopin & "When Day is Done"	1st runner-up	
Montgomery County	Marie Baumgard	Norristown				
Mount Holly	Esther Moore	Mount Holly				
Newark	Ann Harvey	Newark				
New Haven	Ruth S. Rubin	New Haven			Top 12	
New Jersey	Norine Hughes	Glen Ridge				
(New York (state)) New York	Vera Hall	The Bronx			Top 12	
Norristown	Helen Keaser	Norristown		Vocal Medley, "Tell Me That You Love Me Tonight" & "You're a Heavenly Thing"	Top 12	
Penns Grove	Elizabeth Koehler	Penns Grove		Vocal Medley, "Without a Song" & "Roll Out of Bed With a Smile"	Top 12	
Philadelphia	Jean McCool	Philadelphia		Vocal Medley, "Lovely to Look At" & "Little Things You Used to Do"	Top 12	
Pittsburgh	Henrietta Leaver	Pittsburgh	19	Vocal/Tap Dance, "Living in a Great Big Way"	Winner	
Poughkeepsie	Laura Baker	Poughkeepsie				
Providence	Beatrice McKenzie	Providence				
(Quincy, Massachusetts) Quincy	Mary Stanley	Quincy				
Rhode Island	Marianne Ranallo Grasso					
Riverside	Othelia March	Riverside				
Scranton	Alice Brown	Scranton				
Tamaqua	Claire Spirt	Tamaqua				
Tennessee	Sarah Beard	Dickson				
West Orange	Ann Halko	West Orange				
West Philadelphia	Lenora Pollock	West Philadelphia		Vocal, Piano, Banjo, & Dance, "Dark Eyes" & "My Man"	Top 12	
West Warwick	Leona Mucha	West Warwick				
Wilkes-Barre	Gertrude Schappert	Wilkes-Barre				
Woodbury	Thelma Fouks	Woodbury				
