= Rose Coyle =

American model (1914–1988)

- Born: July 30, 1914
- Died: February 24, 1988 (aged 73); Brookhaven, Pennsylvania
- Term: Miss America 1936
- Predecessor: Henrietta Leaver
- Successor: Bette Cooper
- Spouses: Leonard Schlessinger (m. 1938): Robert Dingler
- Children: 1

Rose Veronica Coyle (July 30, 1914 – February 24, 1988) was Miss America 1936.

== Early life ==
Coyle was the eldest child born to John Joseph Coyle, Jr. and Isabel (née Trainer) Coyle.

== Pageantry ==
Coyle was the first to receive an encore in the talent completion at a Miss America pageant; she sang "I Can't Escape from You," and she performed an eight-minute long tap dance.

== Personal life ==
In 1938, Coyle married Leonard Schlessinger, the National General Manager of the Warner Bros. Theatres and had one daughter, Diane.

Widowed, she married executive Robert Dingler and lived a quiet life until her death in 1988.

Awards and achievements
| Preceded by Henrietta Leaver | Miss America; 1936 | Succeeded by Bette Cooper |
