= Marian Bergeron =

American beauty pageant contestant and singer

- Bergeron in 1933
- Born: May 3, 1918
- Died: October 22, 2002 (aged 84); Ohio, U.S.
- Title: Miss America 1933
- Predecessor: Lois Delander
- Successor: Henrietta Leaver
- Spouses: Donald Ruhlman; Frederick Setzer
- Children: 3

Marian Bergeron (May 3, 1918 – October 22, 2002) was Miss America in 1933. She went on to a career in big-band singing and public speaking. She was a major supporter of the Miss America Pageant.

Bergeron, from West Haven, Connecticut, won the crown as the pageant returned to Atlantic City, New Jersey after a five-year hiatus. She is the youngest Miss America in history, winning the crown at the age of 15 1/2. She held the title for two years since no competition was held in 1934. One of the sponsors of the pageant, RKO Pictures, refused to award Bergeron the prize of a screen test, claiming that she was too young.

Bergeron went on to a career in big-band singing. She was already an established singer at the time of the pageant, having started at the age of twelve. She appeared with several bands, among them Rudy Vallee and Guy Lombardo. She later became a public speaker.

Bergeron was married three times. Her first marriage, to Donald Ruhlman, lasted until his death in 1972 and produced three children. She was married to Howard McKnight from 1976 until his death in 1987. Her final marriage, to Frederick Setzer, lasted until his death in March 2002.

Bergeron died of leukemia in Ohio in 2002. As of 2026, she remains the only Miss America from New England.

== In popular culture ==
Bergeron was one of the 48 'Famous Women' illustrated by Bloomsbury Group artists Vanessa Bell and Duncan Grant in their 1932-1934 artwork, the Famous Women Dinner Service. She is in the 'Beauties' section, labeled 'Miss 1933'.

Awards and achievements
Preceded by Lois Delander	Miss America; 1933	Succeeded by Henrietta Leaver
Preceded by -	Miss Connecticut; 1933	Succeeded by Margaretta Kling
