= Tanisha Brito =

American beauty pageant contestant (born 1980)

- Born: Tanisha Nicole Brito; September 11, 1980 (age 46); Waterford, Connecticut, U.S.
- Height: 5 ft 5 in (1.65 m)
- Beauty pageant titleholder
- Title: Miss Connecticut 2002; Miss Georgia USA 2005
- Hair color: Brown
- Eye color: Brown
- Major competitions: Miss America 2003 (Semi-finalist); Miss USA 2005

Tanisha Nicole Brito (born September 11, 1980) is a beauty queen who has competed at both Miss America and Miss USA. Her home town is Waterford, Connecticut. Brito graduated from Waterford High School in 1998. She attended Clark Atlanta University in Georgia which gave her the residency permission to compete in that state's pageant.

Brito's first major pageant was the 2000 Miss Connecticut state pageant, where she finished second runner-up. The following year she competed in Georgia, where she won a non-finalist interview award. She returned to Connecticut in 2002, where she won the swimsuit award and Miss Connecticut crown. Brito was a top ten finalist in the Miss America 2003 pageant.

On November 6, 2004, Brito was crowned Miss Georgia USA.

She competed in the Miss USA 2005 pageant held in Baltimore, Maryland on 11 April 2005, but failed to make the cut at the nationally televised pageant. While preparing for the Miss America pageant, Brito attended the University of Connecticut at Avery Point so as not to disadvantage her studies.

Preceded by Caroline Medley	Miss Georgia USA; 2005	Succeeded by Lisa Wilson
