= George Hurrell =

American photographer (1904–1992)

George Edward Hurrell
- Born: June 1, 1904; Cincinnati, Ohio, U.S.
- Died: May 17, 1992 (aged 87); Los Angeles, California, U.S.
- Education: Art Institute of Chicago
- Occupation: Photographer
- Years active: 1925–1992
- Known for: Hollywood glamour photography in 1930s and 1940s
- Spouses: Katherine Cuddy (m. 1939; div. 1942) Phyllis Bounds (m. 1943; div. 1954) Elizabeth Willis (m. 1955)
- Children: 6

George Edward Hurrell (June 1, 1904 – May 17, 1992) was a photographer who contributed to the image of glamour presented by Hollywood during the 1930s and 1940s.

== Early life ==
Born in the Walnut Hills district of Cincinnati, Ohio, and studied at the School of the Art Institute of Chicago and American Academy of Art College. Hurrell originally studied as a painter with no particular interest in photography. He first began to use photography only as a medium for recording his paintings. After moving to Laguna Beach, California from Chicago, Illinois in 1925 he met many other painters who had connections. One of those connections was Edward Steichen who encouraged him to pursue photography after seeing some of his works. Hurrell also found that photography was a more reliable source of income than painting. Hurrell was an apprentice to Eugene Hutchinson. His photography was encouraged by his friend aviator Pancho Barnes, who often posed for him. He eventually opened a photographic studio in Los Angeles.

== Career in Hollywood ==
In the late 1920s, Hurrell was introduced to the actor Ramon Novarro, by Pancho Barnes, and agreed to take a series of photographs of him. Novarro was impressed with the results and showed them to the actress Norma Shearer, who was attempting to mould her wholesome image into something more glamorous and sophisticated in an attempt to land the title role in the movie The Divorcee. She asked Hurrell to photograph her in poses more provocative than her fans had seen before. After she showed these photographs to her husband, MGM production chief Irving Thalberg, Thalberg was so impressed that he signed Hurrell to a contract with MGM Studios, making him head of the portrait photography department. But in 1932, Hurrell left MGM after differences with their publicity head, and from then on until 1938 ran his own studio at 8706 Sunset Boulevard.

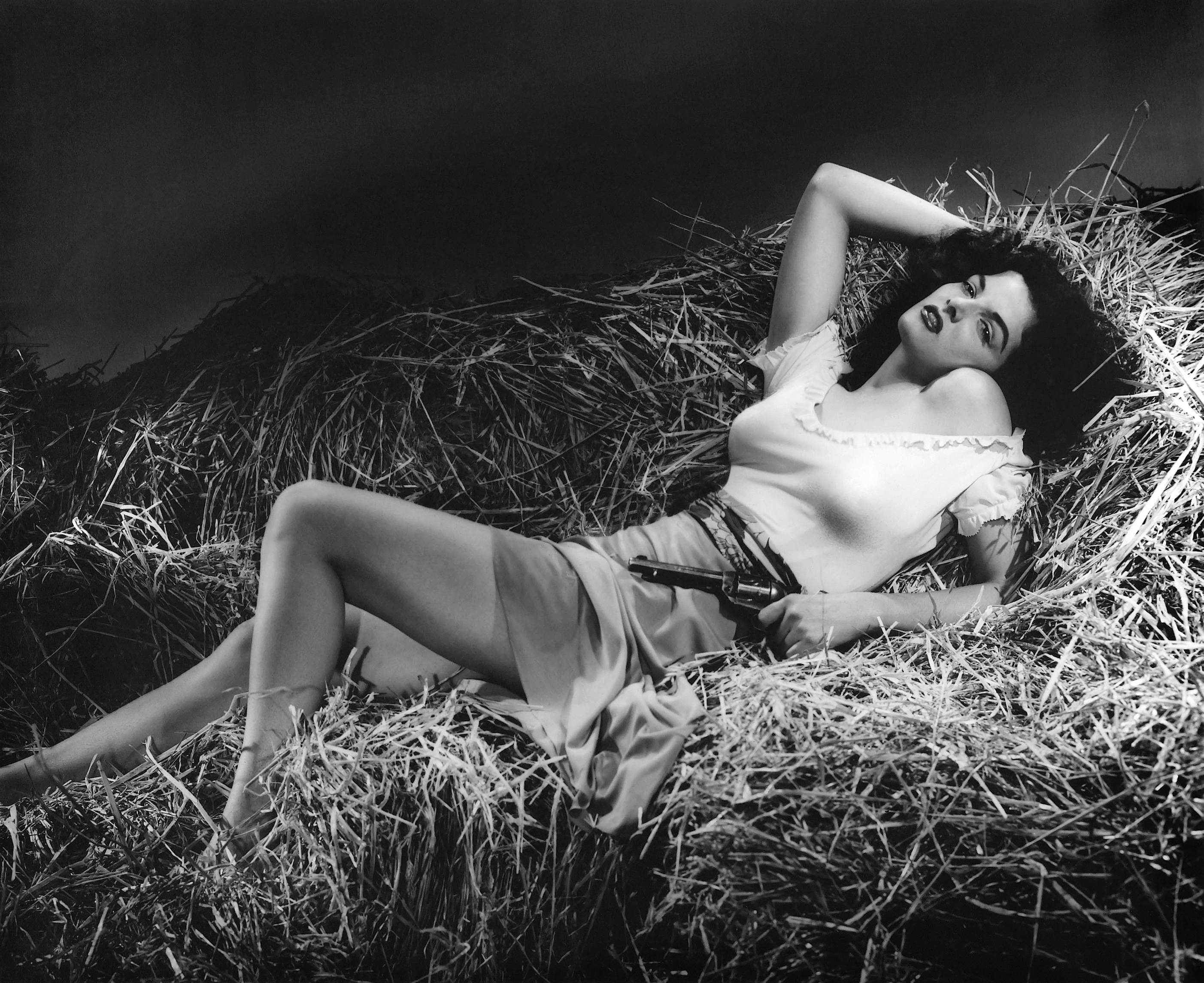
Jane Russell (pictured in 1943) by Hurrell, in a publicity image for The Outlaw

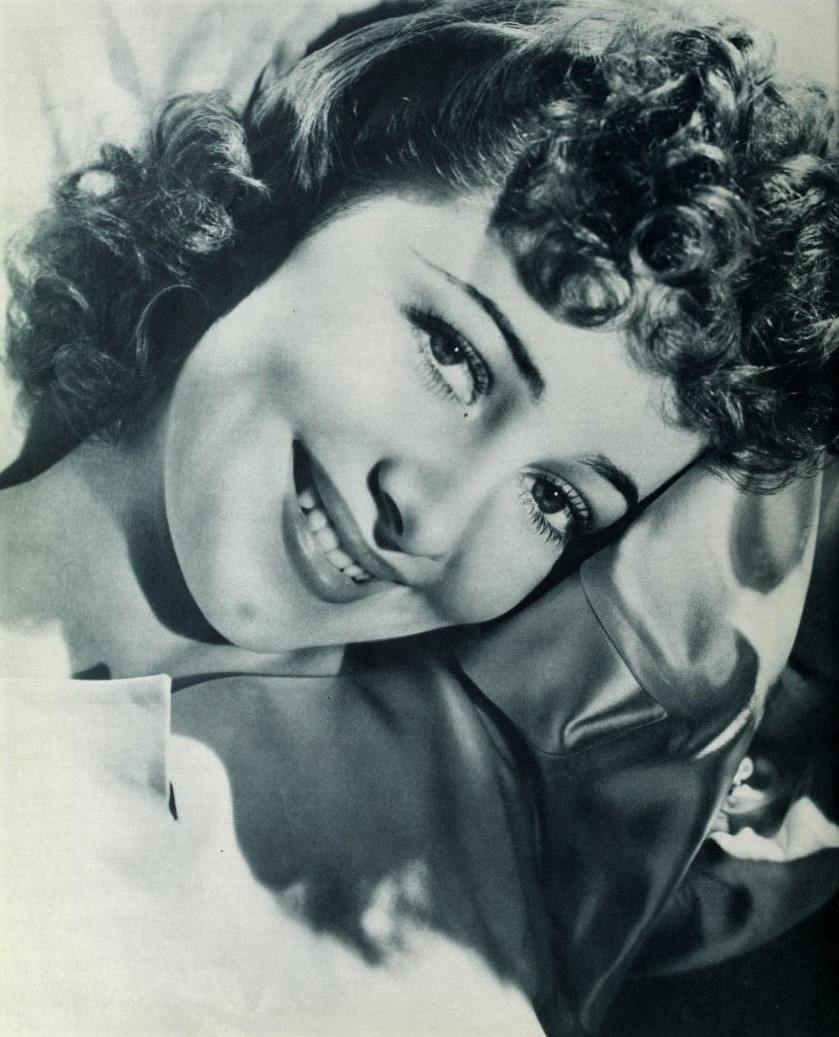
Olivia de Havilland by George Hurrell, 1938

Throughout the decade, Hurrell photographed every star contracted to MGM, and his striking black-and-white images were used extensively in the marketing of these stars. Among the performers regularly photographed by him during these years were silent screen star Dorothy Jordan, as well as Myrna Loy, Robert Montgomery, Jean Harlow, Ramon Novarro, Joan Crawford, Clark Gable, Rosalind Russell, Marion Davies, Jeanette MacDonald, Lupe Vélez, Anna May Wong, Carole Lombard and Norma Shearer, who was said to have refused to allow herself to be photographed by anyone else. He also photographed Greta Garbo at a session to produce promotional material for the movie Romance. The session didn't go well and she never used him again.

In the early 1940s Hurrell moved to Warner Brothers Studios photographing, among others Bette Davis, Jane Russell, Ann Sheridan, Errol Flynn, Olivia de Havilland, Ida Lupino, Alexis Smith, Lauren Bacall, Humphrey Bogart and James Cagney. Later in the decade he moved to Columbia Pictures where his photographs were used to help the studio build the career of Rita Hayworth. He also opened his own photography studio on Rodeo Drive in Beverly Hills for shoots outside of Hollywood productions.

== Postwar ==
He left Hollywood briefly to make training films for the First Motion Picture Unit of the United States Army Air Forces. When he returned to Hollywood in the mid-1950s his old style of glamour had fallen from favour. Where he had worked hard to create an idealised image of his subjects, the new style of Hollywood glamour was more earthy and gritty, and for the first time in his career Hurrell's style was not in demand. He moved to New York City and worked for the advertising industry where glamour was still valued. He continued his work for fashion magazines and photographed for print advertisements for several years before returning to Hollywood in the 1960s. He captured early Marilyn Monroe, and actress Mamie Van Doren, who became a lifelong friend of his.

During the early 1950s, he and then wife Phyllis Bounds approached her uncle Walt Disney who was interested in investing in television as a medium to form a company that would produce commercials with his cartoon characters. They formed Hurrell Productions which produce advertisements promoting products from Kellogg's, Sunkist, Hunt's, Johnson & Johnson, 7-Up, Jell-O and other clients. He also serves as producer, director, and occasionally as cinematographer for several of the commercials. He decided to expand beyond commercials and began negotiating a deal with Mitchell Gertz to produce a Zorro television series starring Gilbert Roland. Walt, however, intervened and put a stop to the plans in favor of his own show. Hurrell began clashing with Walt and decided to move back to New York following his divorce from Bounds but retained the production company until its closure in 1959.

Relocating to Beverly Hills, Hurrell reopened his photography studio and began as stills photographer for various TV shows and films.

After 1970, his most prominent work was as a photographer for album covers. He shot the cover photos for Cass Elliot's self-titled album (1972), Helen Reddy's Imagination (1983), Tom Waits' Foreign Affairs (1977), Fleetwood Mac's Mirage (1982), Queen's The Works (1984), Midge Ure's The Gift (1985) and Paul McCartney's Press to Play (1986).

== Personal life ==
In 1939, he married his first wife, Katherine Cuddy, who was a beauty contest winner from Seattle. During the marriage, he had an affair with Phyllis Bounds, niece of Walt Disney. Cuddy and Hurrell divorced in 1942 before he married Bounds one year later. This marriage resulted in the birth of their children; Victoria (b. 1945), Clancy (b. 1946) and Alexandria (b. 1948). They divorced in 1954.

In 1955, he met and married, Betty Willis. They had three children, George Jr., Daphne, and Michael.

== Death ==
Hurrell died from complications from bladder cancer shortly after completing a TBS documentary about his life. He died on May 17, 1992.
