= Eugene Raymond Hutchinson =

American photographer (1880–1957)

- Born: 1880 near Tampa, Florida
- Died: 1957 (aged 76–77); Manhattan, New York
- Occupation: Photographer
- Spouse: Carola Rust Zabel Hutchinson

Eugene Raymond Hutchinson (May 31, 1880 – April 28, 1957) was an American photographer. Like contemporaries Alfred Stieglitz and Edward Steichen, Hutchinson first made his mark as a pictorialist, using lighting and darkroom techniques to transform his work into artistic images.

== Biography ==
Based in Chicago from about 1910 to 1930, Hutchinson initially specialized in portrait work. winning favor most notably among leading lights in the world of literature, the arts and progressive politics, his clients including Rupert Brooke, Carl Sandburg, Edgar Lee Masters, Anna Pavlova, Emma Goldman, and William Jennings Bryan.

After moving to New York City during the Great Depression, Hutchinson perhaps for economic reasons turned his camera increasingly to industrial subjects, associating himself with Underwood & Underwood, the famous producer of stereoscopic images. His interest in photography as art, however, endured. It was reflected perhaps most dramatically in his "Eighty-Five Years," a study of two, thin clasped hands against a black dress that was one of 155 prints selected by the Royal Photographic Society of London for a 1935 exhibit in which the National Academy of Design belatedly recognized photography as a field of art.

Probably born in Rockville, Indiana, Eugene was raised by a mother who was left a widow with three children before she was 30. As a teenager, he found his way to New York City where he apprenticed with a Broadway society photographer. One source indicates that his mentor was Joseph Hall.

Hutchinson's first known success in exhibiting his work professionally came in 1906 after he returned home to Danville. A catalog for the Chicago Photographic Salon held at the Toledo Museum of Art lists two of his works, Item 188, "Portrait – Mrs. J.S.E." and Item 189, "Great Grandma," the latter listed for sale at $20. By 1910, Hutchinson apparently was supporting himself as a portrait photographer, catering to the well-off residents of Chicago's "Gold Coast" suburbs from his studio in Lake Forest.

From the outset of his career, however, Hutchinson marketed himself widely. At about the same time he opened his Lake Forest studio, he also set up shop in Chicago's Fine Arts Building, about a block south of the Art Institute on Michigan Avenue in the Chicago Landmark Historic Michigan Boulevard District. There he cultivated a following among the Windy City's writers, dancers, and political activists. Additionally, he took on work for advertising and commercial illustration, presaging his focus on industrial photography two decades later.

Regarded as an introvert by his family, Hutchinson described himself as an individualist and professional idealist. Nevertheless, he was not reluctant to engage in self-promotion. In 1909, he exhibited at a major photographic exhibition in Dresden along with Goldensky, Käsebier, and Dooner. In 1918, he was a guest speaker at the Twentieth Annual Convention of the Photographers Association of New England. A year later, he gave a presentation at the annual meeting of the American Association of Photographers.

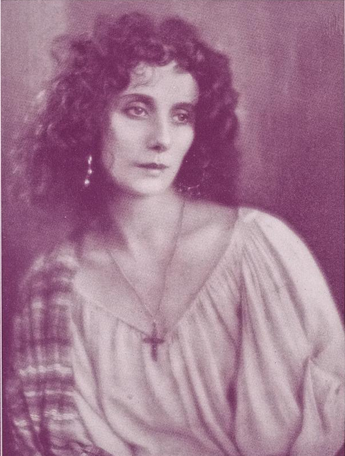
Anna Pavlova by Hutchinson, from a 1921 publication.

Hutchinson is remembered most for his work in the years immediately before and after the First World War. Perhaps no single photograph contributed more to his reputation than his 1914 portrait of the great British poet, Rupert Brooke, a subject who plainly fascinated him. Reflecting on his session with Brooke, Hutchinson said, "I had found myself confronted by an unbelievably beautiful young man. There was nothing effeminate about that beauty. He was man-size and masculine, from his rough tweeds to his thick-soled English boots." A true artist, Hutchinson plainly succeeded in capturing the essence of what he saw. When published after Brooke's death in World War I, his photograph became the definitive image of Brooke. In 1920, an Australian, Tony Skahill, who was with Brooke at his death looked up Hutchinson in Chicago and is reported to have said, "Mr. Hutchinson, I think you have contributed as much to the fame of Rupert Brooke as his own poems have ... [b]ecause you have visualized for every college girl in the world exactly what she hoped Rupert Brooke looked like!"

Today, Hutchinson attracts study mainly for his photographs of dancers. As one source points out, "he developed a fascination with dancers as subjects, cultivating enduring relationships with Anna Pavlova, Adolph Bolm, Ruth Page, and the Pavley-Oukrainsky dance troupe." Among his most widely reproduced works is a series of photographs of Anna Pavlova made during 1915 in Chicago during production of the film, "The Dumb Girl of Portici." While Hutchinson was not the only photographer of the period attracted to dance, his work is distinguished from the product of contemporaries by its lighting. Unlike Arnold Genthe and Maurice Goldberg, for example, Hutchinson rejected one source natural light in his images, relying instead on portable lamps placed in multiple locations.

After moving to a new Chicago studio at 2746 Hampden Court, Hutchinson by the early 1920s had gained sufficient fame to attract top-flight apprentices, most notably William C. Odiorne and George Hurrell. While Hurrell soon made his mark as the definitive photographer of Hollywood stars, Hutchinson placed mounting emphasis on industrial subjects. Perhaps reflecting this change of interests, Hutchinson abandoned Chicago for New York City in 1930, setting up shop in the Bryant Park Studios Building, also the base for Edward Steichen. As David Shields notes, "Like Charles Sheeler and Margaret Bourke-White, he began photographing factories, production lines, and patterned masses of manufactured products. By the 1940s the workers who had appeared as ancillary figures in his industrial photographs throughout the 1930s disappeared. Hutchinson devoted his art to the abstract representation of textures."

When Hutchinson died in Manhattan on April 28, 1957, his passing went unnoticed in both New York and Chicago newspapers. While some of his original photographs were destroyed in a family home after his death, many remain in institutional collections including those of the George Eastman House, the New York City Public Library, National Portrait Gallery, University of Illinois, and Guggenheim Museum. Hutchinson's wife, the highly regarded photographer, Carola Rust, lived until 1977.
