= Miss America 1938 =

- Date: September 10, 1938
- Venue: Steel Pier, Atlantic City, New Jersey
- Entrants: 44
- Placements: 15
- Winner: Marilyn Meseke; Ohio

Miss America 1938, the 12th Miss America pageant, was held at the Steel Pier in Atlantic City, New Jersey on Saturday, September 10, 1938. The decision by the 15 judges there that Miss Ohio, Marilyn Meseke, rather than Miss California, Claire James, as Miss America surprised the audience at the event. Broadway producer Earl Carroll also disagreed with their choice and took the runner-up to New York City where he performed a coronation of Miss California as "the true Miss America" shortly after the official pageant. Carroll's actions resulted in widespread publicity of the incident.

== Results ==
=== Placements ===
Placement	Contestant
Miss America 1938	Ohio – Marilyn Meseke
1st Runner-Up	California – Claire James
2nd Runner-Up	Utah – Muriel La Von Goodspeed
3rd Runner-Up	Asbury Park – Ruth Brady
4th Runner-Up	Jacksonville – Gloria Smyley
Top 15	Arizona – Anna Marie Barnett; Atlanta – Alice Talton; Birmingham – Mildred Marie Oxford; New York City – Barbara Beech; Cleveland – Evelyn Dorothy Bertelsbech; District of Columbia – Dorothy Mae Parker; Empire State – Elissa Barbara Winston; Fort Lauderdale – Mary Jane Thomas; Indiana – Helen Marie Emly; Philadelphia – Kathryn Frances Buckley

=== Awards ===
==== Preliminary awards ====
Award	Contestant
Talent	Asbury Park – Ruth Brady; Jacksonville – Gloria Smyley; Utah – Muriel La Von Goodspeed

== Contestants ==
Title	Name	Hometown	Age	Talent	Placement	Awards	Notes
Arizona	Anna Marie Barnett	Bisbee			Top 15		
Arkansas	Lorene Bailey	Jonesboro		Piano, "Dinah"			
Asbury Park	Ruth E. Brady	Asbury Park		Vocal & Tap Dance	3rd Runner-up	Preliminary Talent Award	
Birmingham	Mildred Oxford	Birmingham		Tap Dance/Toe Ballet	Top 15		
Brooklyn	Barbara Beech	Brooklyn			Top 15		
Burlington	Ruth Joan Sada	Burlington					
California	Claire James	Los Angeles		Dance	1st Runner-up		
Charlotte	Rebecca Pearl Hankins	Charlotte	18				
Cleveland	Evelyn Bertelsbeck	Cleveland			Top 15		
Colorado	Rosanna Bean	Montrose					
Connecticut	Blanche Hawley	Stratford					
Delray Beach	Patricia Hollran			Vocal, "A-Tisket, A-Tasket"			
Detroit	Marjorie Jackson	Detroit					
(Washington, D.C.) District of Columbia	Dorothy Parker			Vocal & Tap Dance, "How'd You Like to Love Me"	Top 15		
Eastern Pennsylvania	Wilma Kaspar	Rahns					
Empire State	Elissa Winston				Top 15		
Florida	Mary Joyce Walsh	Miami		Vocal/Ballet			
Fort Lauderdale	Mary Jane Thomas	Fort Lauderdale			Top 15		
(Georgia (U.S. state)) Georgia	Alice Talton	Atlanta			Top 15		
Indianapolis	Rosemary White						
(Jacksonville, Florida) Jacksonville	Gloria Smyley	Jacksonville		Acrobatic Dance	4th Runner-up	Preliminary Talent Award	
Kansas	Blanche Webb	Humboldt					
Kentucky	Evelyn Cooper	Somerset		Vocal, "A-Tisket, A-Tasket"			
Letts	Helen Emly	Letts			Top 15		
Long Island	Marion Rosamund						
Long Island Sound	Adeline Shull						
Maine	Doris Marie Bergeron	Lewiston					
Maryland	Yolanda Ugarte	Baltimore					
Minnesota	Avis Darrow	Duluth					
Mississippi	Frances Sykes	Aberdeen					
Montgomery	Patricia McDaniel	Montgomery					
Nebraska	Emmajane Newby	Humboldt					
New Jersey	Gloria Martha Riley	Paterson					
New Orleans	Irene Blush Schomberger	New Orleans		Vocal/Trumpet/Dance			
Ohio	Marilyn Meseke	Marion	21	Tap Dance, "How'd You Like to Love Me", "The World is Waiting for the Sunrise", & "Joseph, Joseph"	Winner		
Oklahoma	Marjorie Ann Adams	Ada					
Philadelphia	Kathryn "Kay" Buckley	Philadelphia		Swing Vocal	Top 15		
Riverside	Dorothy Kathryn Powers	Riverside					
South Carolina	Margaret Simrill Land	Chester					
Tennessee	Victoria Ann Motlow	Mulberry		Vocal, "You Turned the Tables on Me"			
Utah	Muriel La Von Goodspeed	Salt Lake City		Classical Vocal & Piano	2nd Runner-up	Preliminary Talent Award	
Virginia	Kathleen Mann	North Arlington					
Western Pennsylvania	Ruth Willock	Pittsburgh					
