= Miss America 1933 =

- Date: September 5–9, 1933
- Venue: Boardwalk Hall, Atlantic City, New Jersey
- Entrants: 31
- Placements: 18
- Winner: Marian Bergeron; Connecticut

Miss America 1933, the eighth Miss America pageant, was held at the Boardwalk Hall in Atlantic City, New Jersey on Saturday, September 9, 1933. This was the first competition since postponing the event after the 1927 contest. Armand Nichols attempted to organize it with the support of the Mayor and City Council, but without support from either the Atlantic City Chamber of Commerce. or the Hotelsmens Association,

While the contestants of the pageants of the 1920s mostly represented cities, usually sponsored by local newspapers, 1933 marked the change to exclusively state queens with little newspaper sponsorship. The lack of organizational infrastructure together with the decline of (free) newspaper support and advertising resulted in state qualifying contests that varied widely - from multi-day multi-city contests involving thousands, to a simple selection from a photo array.

The 1933 pageant, a five-day extravaganza on Tuesday-Saturday, September 5–9, 1933, was the first to be held at the Convention Hall (later renamed the Boardwalk Hall). Promised grand prizes (including a RKO screen test, theatrical contracts, Ford automobile, diamond wrist watch and a trip to Bermuda) enticed 31 contestants from 30 states nationwide, far fewer than the 48 state contestants originally planned.

Marian Bergeron, Miss Connecticut, was chosen Miss America but there was so much confusion during and after the vote tabulations that nobody informed Marian she had won. She was unaware of her victory until the dressing assistants placed the banner on her. At age 15 she is the youngest winner in the history of the Miss America Pageant.

The pageant was a public relations nightmare, financially unsuccessful, with a "Keystone Kops series of mishaps" including a stolen crown. Two contestants withdrew, four were disqualified, four were underage, four represented states they did not reside in, and 18 states sent no contestant. Amid the contention and bickering there were allegations the contest was not on the "up and up" and judge Russell Patterson alleged undue influence, stating that Atlantic County treasurer and political boss Nucky Johnson tried to pressure the judges to choose his favorite. The pageant went on hiatus again the following year but was revived permanently in 1935 with new organization.

== Results ==
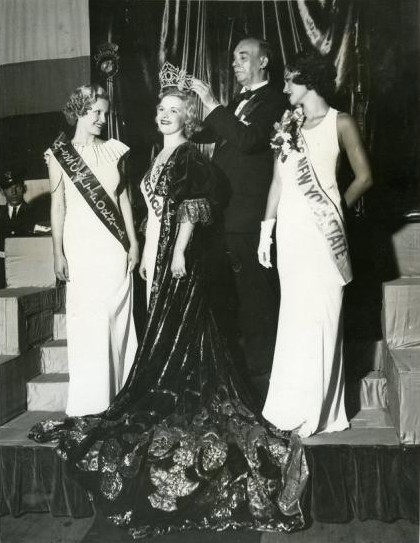
Marion Bergeron crowned as Miss America of 1933; first runner-up Miss New York State Florence Meyers on the right and second runner-up Miss California Blanche McDonald on the left. (See reference #7 below). Marion was so petite that she was dwarfed by the mammoth crown: "It was so big it came right down over my eyes," Marion recalled with a laugh. Then, during the rush of post-coronation activities, the crown was stolen from Miss America's suite at the Ritz Carlton.

=== Placements ===
| Placement | Contestant |
|---|---|
| Miss America 1933 | Connecticut – Marian Bergeron |
| 1st Runner-Up | New York – Florence Meyers |
| 2nd Runner-Up | California – Blanche McDonald |
| 3rd Runner-Up | Virginia – Evangeline Glidewell |
| Top 18 | District of Columbia – Rita Burns; Kentucky – Lucille Rader; Louisiana – Marjorie Hagler; Maine – Iva Stewart; Massachusetts – Elsie Taylor; Michigan – Barbara Strand; Mississippi – Dorothy Eley; Missouri – Marie LaTourette Marks; New Jersey – Gertrude Christman; Ohio – Corinne Porter; Pennsylvania – Geraldine Glassman; Washington – Gladine Sweetser; West Virginia – Mildred Fetty; Wisconsin – Marie Marguerite Huebner |

=== Other awards - September 6: Most Beautiful Girl in an Evening Gown Competition ===
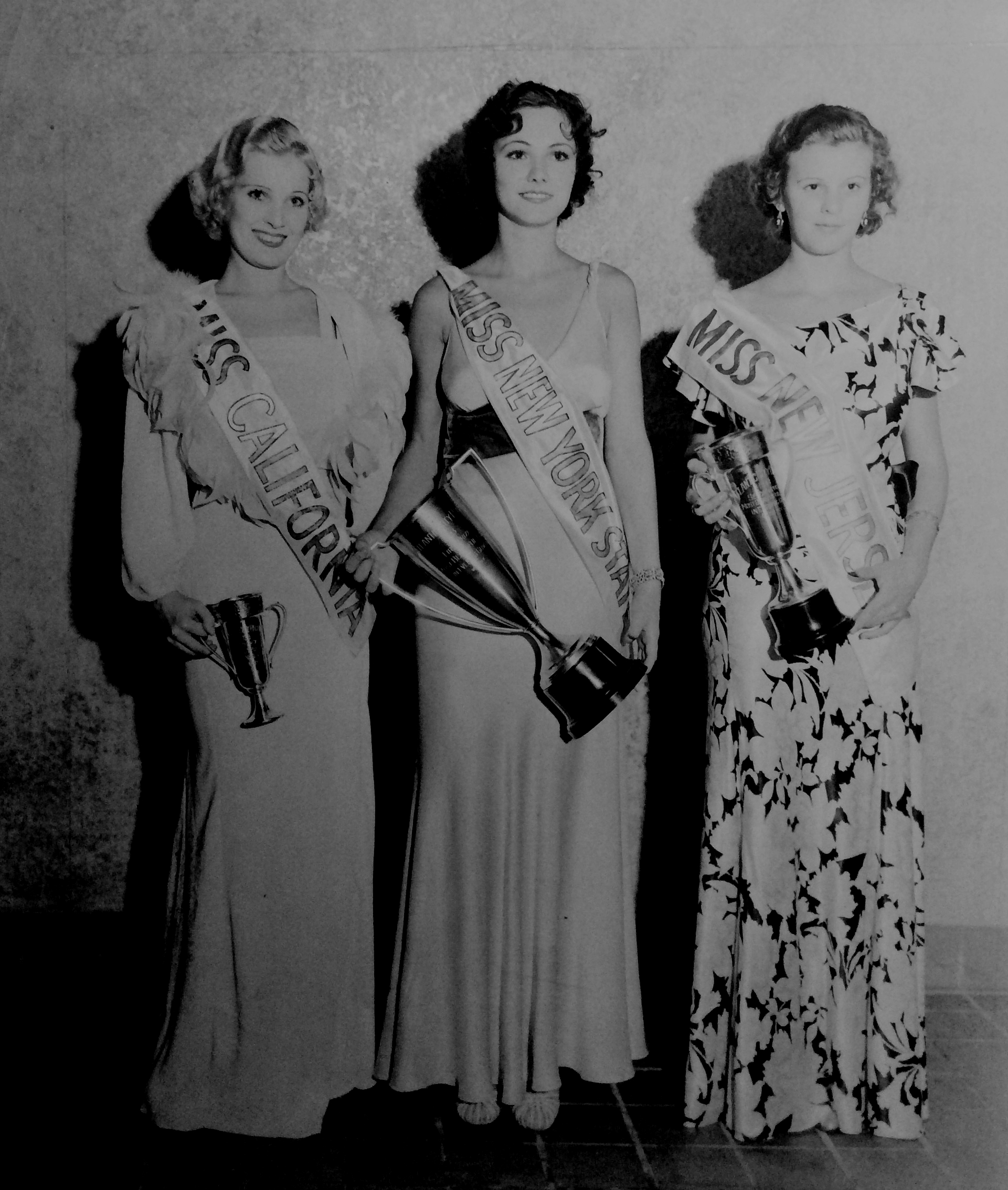
Sep 6 Evening Gown Competition at the American Beauty Ball Gala, Gateway Casino, Somers Point, NJ - from left: third place Miss CA, winner Miss NYS, second place Miss NJ. (see picture of all contestants at the bottom of the page)

| Result | Contestant |
|---|---|
| Winner of the Evening Gown competition | New York – Florence Meyers |
| Second Place | New Jersey – Gertrude Christman |
| Third Place | California – Blanche McDonald |
| Semi-Finalists | Connecticut – Marian Bergeron; Maine – Iva Stewart; Michigan – Barbara Strand; New York City – Elsa Donath; Pennsylvania – Geraldine Glassman; Virginia – Evangeline Glidewell; Washington – Gladine Sweetser |

== Contestants ==
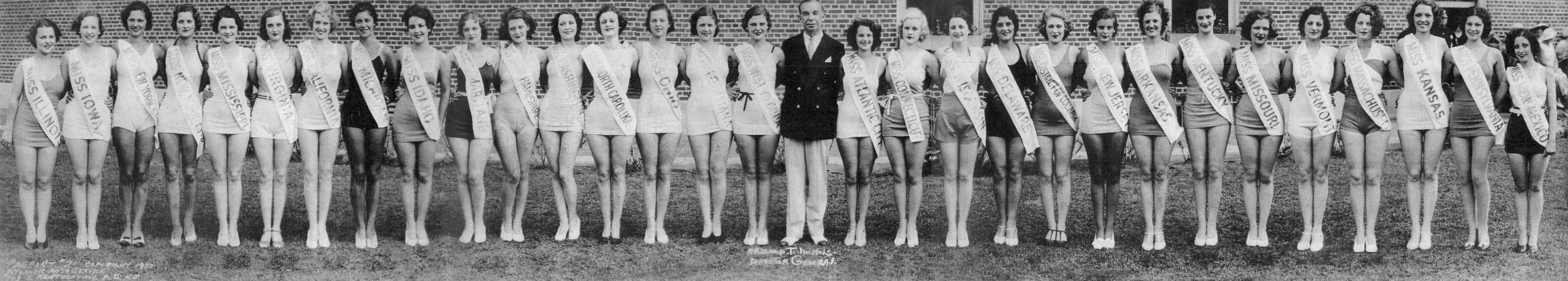
29 Miss America contestants with Pageant Organizer Armand Nichols and hostess Miss Atlantic City (Miss Maine is missing as she had no bathing suit; Miss Oklahoma had withdrawn due to hospitalization with appendicitis). Thank you to Louis K. Meisel for sharing this from his Miss America panorama collection.

| State/City | Name | Hometown | Age | Placement |
|---|---|---|---|---|
| Arkansas | Vivian Ferguson | Little Rock | 21 | Disqualified - married (Note: Both Miss AR Vivian Ferguson and Miss KY Lucille Rader were chosen in photo arrays in May to the prestigious Court of Honor of the International Exposition (1933 World's Fair) in Chicago, to compete on May 26 for Queen to dedicate its opening. Although single when she applied, Vivian married Charles Stanley on May 20 prior selection of the Queen. In Atlantic City Vivian admitted she was married and stated that Miss America MidWest promoter Jimmy Carrier simply chose her to be Miss AR.) |
| California | Blanche McDonald | Hollywood, Los Angeles | 18 | 2nd runner-up, #3 Evening Gown competition |
| Connecticut | Marian Bergeron | West Haven | 15 | Winner |
| Delaware | Victoria George | Newark | 19 | |
| (Washington, D.C.) District of Columbia | Rita Burns | Washington, D.C. | 19 | Top 18 |
| Idaho | Margaret Wittman | Spokane, Washington | 19 | Disqualified - residency |
| Illinois | Lillian Mary Kroener | St. Louis, Missouri | 18 | Disqualified - residency |
| Iowa | Eleanor Alma Dankenbring | Manning, Iowa | 20 | Disqualified - residency |
| Kansas | Pauline Sayre | Wichita | 23 | |
| Kentucky | Lucille Rader | Berea | 14 | Top 18 |
| Louisiana | Marjorie Hagler | Winnfield | 18 | Top 18 |
| Maine | Iva Stewart | Hebron | 19 | Top 18 |
| Maryland | Dorothy Dennis | Baltimore | 16 | |
| Massachusetts | Elsie Taylor | South Walpole | 23 | Top 18 |
| Michigan | Barbara Strand | Dearborn | 17 | Top 18 |
| Mississippi | Dorothy Eley | Moss Point | 24 | Top 18 |
| Missouri | Marie LaTourette Marks | St. Louis | 15 | Top 18 |
| New Hampshire | Letha Langley | Caribou, Maine | 19 | |
| New Jersey | Gertrude Christman | Ridgefield | 15 | Top 18, #2 Evening Gown competition |
| New Mexico | Julia Valdez | Albuquerque | 18 | |
| New York City | Elsa Donath | Bronx, New York City | 19 | withdrew |
| (New York (state)) New York State | Florence Meyers | East Rockaway, Long Island | 21 | 1st runner-up, #1 Evening Gown competition |
| North Carolina | Leola Councilman | Bonlee | 20 | |
| Ohio | Corinne Porter | Youngstown | 19 | Top 18 |
| Oklahoma | Joanne Alcorn | Ponca City | 16 | withdrew |
| Pennsylvania | Geraldine Glassman | Philadelphia | 18 | Top 18 |
| Vermont | Nettina Anne Rich | Norton, Massachusetts | 19 | |
| Virginia | Evangeline Glidewell | Danville | 18 | 3rd runner-up |
| (Washington (state)) Washington | Gladine Sweetser | Seattle | 22 | Top 18 |
| West Virginia | Mildred Fetty | Clarksburg | 20 | Top 18 |
| Wisconsin | Marie Marguerite Huebner | Portage | 19 | Top 18 |

program of the 1933 Miss America Pageant - history, program of events, advertisements, but nothing on the contestants (18-page pdf)

== Notes and references ==
=== Secondary sources ===
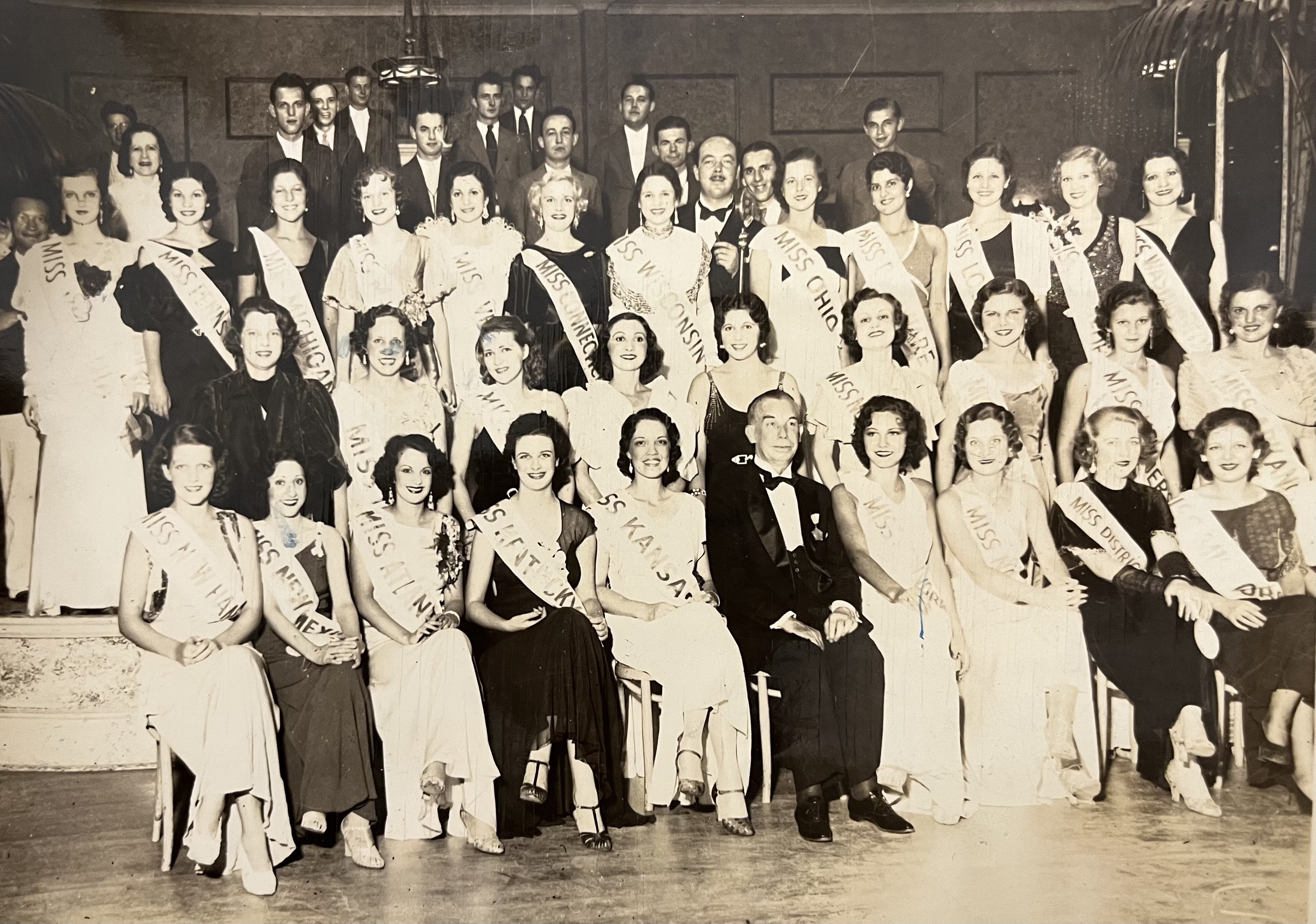
Sep 6, 1933 American Beauty Ball Gala, Gateway Casino, Somers Point, NJ. Dinner and judging for the "most beautiful girl in an evening gown".

- Osborne, Angela Saulino (1995). "Miss America The Dream Lives On" "A 75 Year Celebration" p.84-85. Taylor Publishing Company. ISBN 0-87833-110-7.
