= Bette Cooper =

American model (1920–2017)

Elizabeth "Bette" Cooper
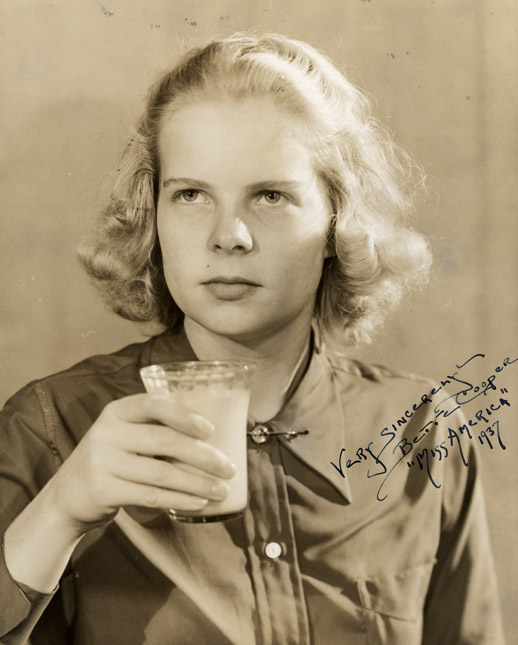
- Autographed portrait of Bette Cooper
- Born: August 11, 1920; Hackettstown, New Jersey, U.S.
- Died: December 10, 2017 (aged 97); Greenwich, Connecticut, U.S.
- Education: Centenary University
- Title: Miss Bertrand Island 1937; Miss America 1937
- Predecessor: Rose Coyle
- Successor: Marilyn Meseke
- Spouse: William F. Moore (m. 1951)
- Children: 2

Elizabeth Cooper-Moore (August 11, 1920 – December 10, 2017) won the Miss America 1937 pageant as Miss Bertrand Island, representing an amusement park on Lake Hopatcong in New Jersey.

== Early life ==
She was born in Hackettstown, New Jersey. Cooper attended Centenary Junior College (now Centenary University) in Hackettstown where she was a member of the Delta Sigma Sigma sorority and graduated from Centenary Junior College's Academy in 1938 at ceremonies attended by Governor of New Jersey, A. Harry Moore, later graduating from Centenary Junior College in 1940.

== Pageantry ==
She caused a stir when she disappeared for some 24 hours with 23-year-old Louis Off, after winning the Miss America title. Evidently overwhelmed by what was expected of her, she insisted upon a much lighter schedule so that she could attend college. This led pageant officials to have future Miss America contestants sign agreements as to what duties were expected of the winner and also be chaperoned.

== Career ==
Cooper, who did some modeling and appearances in the years after her title, long shunned any connection or involvement with Miss America. Michael Callahan wrote a roman à clef on Cooper titled The Night She Won Miss America (2017).

== Personal life ==
She married a Wall Street executive, William Moore, and had two children, Cheryl and Gregory, as well as four grandchildren. Cooper died in December 2017 at the age of 97.

Awards and achievements
Preceded by Rose Coyle	Miss America; 1937	Succeeded by Marilyn Meseke
