= Miss America 1937 =

- Date: September 11, 1937
- Presenters: King Neptune
- Venue: Steel Pier, Atlantic City, New Jersey
- Entrants: 49
- Placements: 16
- Winner: Bette Cooper; Bertrand Island, New Jersey

Miss America 1937, the 11th Miss America pageant, was held at the Steel Pier in Atlantic City, New Jersey on Saturday, September 11, 1937. Shortly after being presented as Miss America, the newly crowned 17-year-old winner, Bette Cooper, left Atlantic City and returned home. Once there, she missed scheduled appointments on her first day as Miss America, as well as a theater appearance and a trip to Hollywood. Her father cited illness as the reason. Though not placing in the top five, representatives from different areas of New York captured three of the semi-finalist positions.

== Results ==
=== Placements ===
Placement	Contestant
Miss America 1937	Bertrand Island – Bette Cooper
1st Runner-Up	Texas – Alice Emerick
2nd Runner-Up	North Carolina – Ruth Covington
3rd Runner-Up	California – Phyllis Randall
4th Runner-Up	Miami – Irmigard Dietel
Top 16	Bronx – Helen Fleiss; Buckeye Lake – Evelyn Townley; Charlotte – Betty Hunneycutt; Kansas – Lucia Benton; Louisiana – Gertrude Rissie Miller; Massachusetts – Claire Jean Nevulis; New York City – Grace Travis; Ohio – Jean Bernice Fadden; St. Louis – Wauneta Bates; Virginia – Frances L. Sultan; Westchester County – Evelyn Raye

=== Awards ===
Best Evening Gown

- Bette Cooper (Bertrand Island)

==== Preliminary awards ====
Awards	Contestant	Title
Talent	Phyllis Randall	California
Talent	Claire Jean Nevulis	Massachusetts
Talent	Grace Travis	New York City

== Contestants ==
Name	Title	Hometown	Age	Talent	Placement	Awards	Notes
Lorraine Mayfield	Atlanta	Atlanta					
Olga Strickland	Augusta						
May Vivian Miller	Baltimore	Baltimore					
Bette Cooper	Bertrand Island	Hackettstown	17	Vocal, "When the Poppies Bloom Again"	Winner	Best Evening Gown Award	
Josephine Beall	Birmingham						
Helen Fleiss	Bronx	The Bronx			Top 16		
Evelyn Townley	Buckeye Lake				Top 16		
Phyllis Randall	California	Hollywood	20	Vocal/Dance	3rd Runner-up	Preliminary Talent Award	Sister of Miss North Carolina 1941, Joey Augusta Paxton
Betty Hunneycutt	Charlotte	Charlotte			Top 16		
Sally Lillian Frank	Cincinnati	Cincinnati					
Frances Greene	Connecticut	Milford					
Nickey Harriet	Delaware	Harrington					
Mary P. Hollran	Delray Beach	Delray Beach					
Helen Greene	(Washington, D.C.) District of Columbia		24	Blues Vocal & Piano			
Beryl Kober	Eastern Pennsylvania	Chalfont					
Margaret Myers	Eastern Shores	Rock Hall					
Dorothy Armstrong	Empire State	Whitesboro					
Frances Powell	Jacksonville						
Lucia Benton	Kansas	Norton			Top 16		
Audrey Catherine Flaig	Kentucky	Bellevue					
Gertrude Rissie Miller	Louisiana	Winnsboro			Top 16		
Cornelia Campbell	Maine	South Portland					
Claire Nevulis	Massachusetts	South Boston		Vocal/Tap Dance	Top 16	Preliminary Talent Award	
Irmigard Dietel	Miami			Vocal	4th Runner-up		
Cecelia Rodge	Minnesota	Minneapolis					
Virginia Riley	Mississippi	West Point					
Mary Sue Klein	Moberly	Moberly					
Ingram Starkey	Montgomery	Montgomery					
Ruth Lenore Jones	Nebraska	Nebraska City					
Grace Travis	New York City	New York City		Vocal	Top 16	Preliminary Talent Award	
Ruth Covington	North Carolina			Tap Dance, "Gonna Go"	2nd Runner-up		
Jean Fadden	Ohio	Cleveland			Top 16		
Kathryn Crase	Philadelphia	Philadelphia					
Malen Pietrantoni	Puerto Rico						
Dorothy May Eden	Rhode Island	East Providence	18				Dr. Dorothy May Eden Trayner Erinakes died at 97 on March 20, 2017 in San Luis Obispo, California.
Helen Frances Murphy	Riverside	Riverside					
Oliver Henderson	San Antonio						
Carolyn Cumbie	Savannah Beach						
Wayring Smathers	South Carolina	Columbia					
Margaret Julia Jardon	South Jersey	Burlington					
Wauneta Bates	St. Louis	St. Louis			Top 16		
Kathryn H. Kendrick	Sunnybrook	Sunnybrook					
Alice Emerick	Texas	Fort Worth		Tap Dance	1st Runner-up		
Irene Alice Vanderburgh	Troy	Watervliet					
Frances Lee Sultan	Virginia	Kecoughtan			Top 16		
Juliana Bernhardt	(Washington (state)) Washington	Seattle					
Evelyn Raye	Westchester County	New Rochelle			Top 16		
Mary Ann McLaughlin	Wyoming	Riverton					
