= Henrietta Leaver =

American beauty pageant winner

- Born: Henrietta Applegate; March 28, 1916; Monongahela, Pennsylvania, U.S.
- Died: September 18, 1993 (aged 77); Columbus, Ohio, U.S.
- Title: Miss Pittsburgh; Miss America 1935
- Predecessor: Marian Bergeron
- Successor: Rose Coyle
- Spouses: Johnny Mustacchio (m. 1936; div. 1944) Fred Nesseer (m. 1946) Ed Mider (m. 1972)
- Children: 2

Henrietta Leaver (March 28, 1916 – September 18, 1993), Miss Pittsburgh, was crowned Miss America on September 7, 1935, at Atlantic City in New Jersey. She was 19 years old.

== Early life ==
Leaver was born to George and Celia Applegate. She never knew her father, who her mother left before she turned one year old. Her mother then married George Leaver, who then adopted Henrietta.

== Public life ==
Following a one-year hiatus in the national competition, and only the second pageant since 1927, Leaver, from McKeesport, Pennsylvania near Pittsburgh, was announced, from among the field of 55 entrants, as Miss America 1935.

Leaver had dropped out of high school at age 16 to assist her single-parent family financially during the Depression, working at the Five and Ten in McKeesport. She had, however, lost that job many months prior to entering her local contest and had no expectations of becoming a movie star or finding a rich husband due to her scheduled appearance at the Atlantic City pageant. She simply wanted a steady job. Shortly after being crowned, it was announced that Leaver had been offered two screen tests.

Two months after her victory, Leaver found herself in a battle with Pittsburgh sculptor Frank Vittor - a sculptor famous for his bronze statues of Calvin Coolidge, Woodrow Wilson, Theodore Roosevelt and Abraham Lincoln - when she discovered that the life-size clay statue she had posed for in a bathing suit depicted her fully nude. Though reference to the art being exhibited is lacking, other than appearing in the newspaper sometime in November of that same year, Leaver and her manager met with Vittor and rejected any form of contract and refused her approval that the statue be publicly shown.

Feeling the work should be draped, she lost her opinion battle when a group of seven artists declared that the statue was not suggestive or vulgar. Not satisfied, Leaver then requested that people her age view and comment upon the statue and 60 students, many from art classes, upheld the verdict of the artists; that there should be no veil or draping covering the nude work of art. There is mention that the clay statue was planned to be bronzed, however there is no evidence that this ever occurred.

Leaver turned down a role offered her by Broadway producer Earl Carroll of Murder at the Vanities fame, as she would have been scantily clad while performing on stage.

During her time on the West Coast Leaver won another crown, “Miss Model America of 1936,” a contest for models representing department stores around the country. Along with another trophy, she received a screen contract and was cast to appear in the musical motion picture Star Struck. She had only one other movie audition and did not again appear on the big screen.

In the late 1930s, Leaver had been contacted by Columbia Pictures requesting the release of photographic images of her taken during her short stint in Hollywood, when she had been at 20th Century Fox, during her year serving as Miss America. Although she could never prove it, Leaver, who had been paid $250 for the photos, was convinced that the striking image atop Columbia’s logo was modeled after her photographs and her nude statue. There have been other reports of women having posed or being used for the Columbia Pictures torch-bearing lady.

Years later, discussion of Leaver’s controversial nude statue would return to prominence when Vanessa Williams lost her Miss America title, by comparing Leaver not being invited back to crown her successor as she had “posed for a nude statue” – despite wearing a bathing suit while posing, with her grandmother present and with no knowledge that the artwork would display her naked.

== Personal life ==
Well into her reign as Miss America, in July 1936, it was disclosed that Leaver had eloped with her longtime boyfriend, Johnny Mustacchio. The marriage, according to her mother, had taken place two months earlier, on May 28. There exists, however, another report based on a personal interview with Leaver that she had actually secretly married on January 1, 1936, not quite four months into her reign. Her marriage to Mustacchio lasted until 1944 when she filed for divorce.

Leaver later, in 1946, married Fred Nesseer of Columbus, OH. There is mention she had lost two husbands by death, and that in 1983 she had been married to her fourth husband, Ed Mider, for 11 years.

Leaver died of cancer in September 1993.

Awards and achievements
Preceded by Marian Bergeron	Miss America; 1935	Succeeded by Rose Coyle
Preceded by Mary Millnack	Miss Pittsburgh; 1935	Succeeded by Bonnie Boyle
