= Marilyn Meseke =

American beauty queen

- Born: Mary Ellen Spurrier; October 7, 1916
- Died: September 12, 2001 (aged 84)
- Title: Miss Ohio 1931; Miss Ohio 1938; Miss America 1938
- Predecessor: Bette Cooper
- Successor: Patricia Donnelly
- Spouses: Stanley Hume (m. 1944): Benjamin Rogers
- Children: 1

Marilyn Meseke /ˈmɛsɛki/ (MESS-kee; October 7, 1916 – September 12, 2001) was an American beauty queen who had the distinction of being twice crowned Miss Ohio (1931 and 1938) and Miss America in 1938.

== Early life ==
Meseke was christened "Mary Ellen Spurrier" in 1917, near Lima, Ohio.

While still an infant, her mother surrendered custody to her maternal grandparents, Charlie and Clara Meseke. Following her adoption, she was renamed Marilyn, given her grandmother's surname of Meseke and reared in the family home on South Prospect Street in Marion, Ohio. While still a child, she exhibited a talent for dance and received formal dance instruction throughout her childhood; she later became a tap dance instructor, using the family's living room as her studio.

== Pageantry ==
Meseke entered and won the Miss Ohio competition twice. Her first title was won in 1931 at the age of 14; her young age kept her from the national pageant. Her second title in 1938 qualified her to represent Ohio in the national Miss America pageant. The 1938 pageant was the first year that talent became a scoring event in the competition which was serendipitous as Meseke was a talented tap dancer. While her hometown listened to the pageant on the radio, Meseke won the crown on September 10, 1938.

The event also marked the first time that movie audiences could see a Miss America being crowned through news reel footage shown the week following the event. Meseke's return to Marion on September 29, 1938, included a night time parade attended by 30,000 well wishers from hometown and surrounding communities.

== Personal life ==
Following the pageant win, Meseke continued to make appearances and teach dance in Marion. She married Stanley Hume, a pilot, in 1943; they were the parents of one son. The couple relocated to Florida.

Following the death of her first husband Stanley Hume, Marilyn Meseke Hume married pilot Benjamin Rogers.

Meseke died in Florida on September 12, 2001, aged 84.

== Notes ==
Awards and achievements
Preceded by Bette Cooper	Miss America; 1938	Succeeded by Patricia Donnelly
