= Famous Women Dinner Service =

Set of 50 dinnerplates

The Famous Women Dinner Service is a set of 50 dinnerplates, each hand-decorated by Bloomsbury Group artists Vanessa Bell and Duncan Grant. Commissioned as a dinner service without a brief by art historian and museum director Kenneth Clark in 1932, the set was made between 1932 and 1934. It represents 48 notable women, with another two plates that depict the artists, and has been recognised as a "bold, feminist statement", cementing Bell and Grant's "seminal role in feminist art history".

The dinner service predates American artist Judy Chicago's 1979 The Dinner Party by 45 years.

The dinner service is on permanent display at Charleston Farmhouse in East Sussex, the place of its creation.

== Background ==
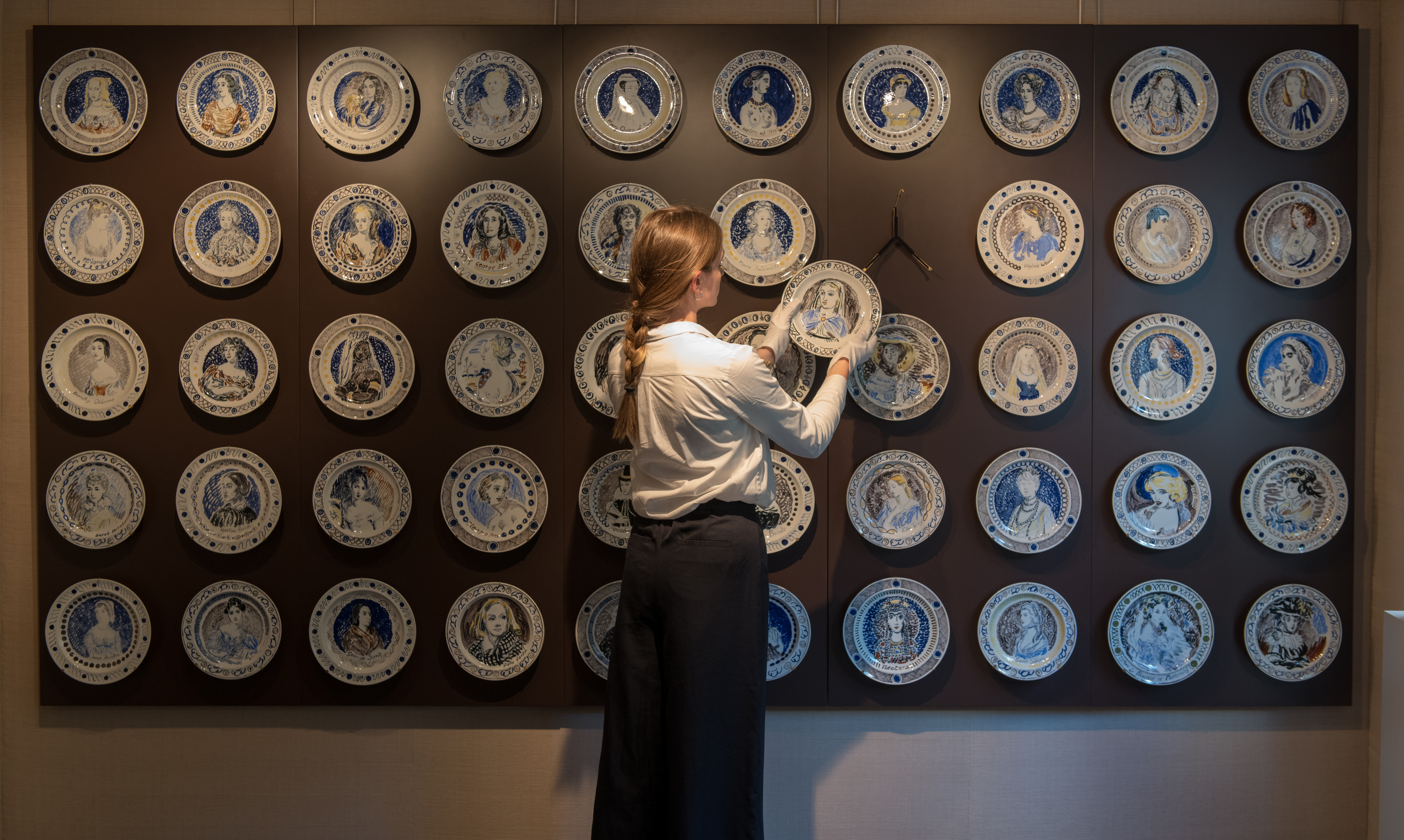
The Famous Women Dinner Service by Vanessa Bell and Duncan Grant on display at Piano Nobile in 2018.

In 1932 Kenneth Clark, an English art historian and Keeper of the Fine Art Department of the Ashmolean Museum in Oxford, decided to commission a dinner service. He was inspired by a dinner he had attended, held by New York-based art dealer Sir Joseph Duveen, during which the meal was served on a lavish Sèvres dinner service, part of the 744-piece Cameo Service made for the Russian Empress Catherine the Great in 1778–1779. Clark commissioned artists Duncan Grant and Vanessa Bell, whose Omega Workshops design collective was well known and admired. There was no brief. Clark's wife Jane (1902–1976) oversaw the production, communicating regularly with Bell. Clark accepted the Directorship of the National Gallery in London in January 1934, the year the service was completed. (Note: Some of the sources quoted here mistakenly report that Clark was appointed Director of the National Gallery in 1932, and some in 1933.)

== Design ==
Despite agreeing to supply "36 large plates, 12 smaller plates, 36 side plates, 12 soup cups & saucers, 1 salad bowl & stand, 2 junket dishes, 6 oval dishes at different sizes, 2 sauce boats & stands, 4 pepper pots, 4 salt pots, 4 mustard pots, 2 sauce tureens & stands & handles, and 3 Liverpool jugs”, Bell and Grant sourced 50 plain white Wedgwood plates, chosen after a tour of the works hosted by Josiah Wedgwood. They were free to decorate the crockery in whatever manner they chose. They worked on the plates at their home, Charleston Farmhouse, and settled on the representation of famous women from history, divided into four groups of twelve: ‘Women of Letters’, ‘Queens’, ‘Beauties’, and ‘Dancers and Actresses’. They included themselves in the 50. The plates have hand-painted portraits of the head and shoulders of the women (and lone man), with their name and a decorative border. The artists did not sign the plates. Most of the women depicted were from history, biblical history or mythology; five were alive at the time of the set's construction (not counting the artists themselves): Virginia Woolf (Bell's sister), Mary of Teck, Marian Bergeron, Mrs Patrick Campbell and Greta Garbo.

=== Women of Letters ===
- 1. Jane Austen (1775–1817)
- 2. Elizabeth Barrett Browning (1806–1861) and her dog Flush
- 3. Charlotte Brontë (1816–1855)
- 4. George Eliot (1819–1880)
- 5. Fanny Kemble (1809–1893)
- 6. Murasaki Shikibu (c. 973–c. 1014 or 1025)
- 7. Dorothy Osborne (1627–1695)
- 8. Christina Rossetti (1830–1894)
- 9. George Sand (1804–1876)
- 10. Sappho (c. 630–c. 570 BCE)
- 11. Germaine de Staël (1766–1817)
- 12. Virginia Woolf (1882–1941) (Vanessa Bell's sister)

=== Queens ===
- 13. Catherine the Great (1729–1796)
- 14. Christina, Queen of Sweden (1626–1689)
- 15. Cleopatra (70/69–30 BCE)
- 16. Elizabeth I (1533–1603)
- 17. Eugénie de Montijo (1826–1920)
- 18. Jezebel (died c. 843 BCE)
- 19. Marie Antoinette (1755–1793)
- 20. Mary, Queen of Scots (1542–1587)
- 21. Mary of Teck (1867–1953)
- 22. Queen of Sheba (c. 1000 BCE)
- 23. Theodora (c. 500–548)
- 24. Queen Victoria (1819–1901)

=== Beauties ===
- 25. Beatrice Portinari (c. 1265–1290)
- 26. Marian Bergeron (1918–2002) 'Miss 1933'
- 27. Sarah Churchill (1660–1744)
- 28. Pauline von Metternich (1836–1921)
- 29. Lola Montez (1821–1861)
- 30. Pocahontas (c. 1596–1617)
- 31. Rachel (Biblical figure)
- 32. Juliette Récamier (1777–1849)
- 33. Elizabeth Siddal (1829–1862)
- 34. Agnès Sorel (1422–1450)
- 35. Helen of Troy (Greek mythology)
- 36. Simonetta Vespucci (1453–1476)

=== Dancers and Actresses ===
- 37. Sarah Bernhardt (1844–1923)
- 38. Marie-Anne de Cupis de Camargo (1710–1770) La Camargo
- 39. Mrs Patrick Campbell (1865–1940)
- 40. Eleonora Duse (1858–1924)
- 41. Greta Garbo (1905–1990)
- 42. Nell Gwyn (1650–1687)
- 43. Dorothea Jordan (1762–1816)
- 44. Lillie Langtry (1853–1929)
- 45. Anna Pavlova (1881–1931)
- 46. Sarah Siddons (1755–1831)
- 47. Marie Taglioni (1804–1884)
- 48. Ellen Terry (1847–1928)

=== The Artists ===
- 49. Vanessa Bell (1879–1961)
- 50. Duncan Grant (1885–1978) The only man in the service

== Subsequent history ==
It has been speculated that Clark might have been surprised by the commission, as he was expecting a more traditional full dinner service with a variety of plates and dishes. The dinner service remained in Clark's possession up to his death in 1983. The set was inherited by Clark's second wife Nolwen de Janzé-Rice (1924–1989, m. 1977), who took the service to her home in France. After her death, the set was then sold at an auction in Germany in the late 1980s. In either 2016 or 2017 the owner of the dinner service sold the service to the Piano Nobile art gallery in London, (Note: Different sources give different timelines: Art Fund and others say Piano Nobile had the service in 2016; Leaper (British Art Studies 7, 30 November 2017) says the private owner approached Piano Nobile following a Vanessa Bell monographic exhibition at Dulwich Picture Gallery in spring 2017.) which then sold the set to the Charleston Trust in 2018. The Trust was aided in its purchase with grants from the National Heritage Memorial Fund and the Art Fund, as well as private donations. It was returned to Charleston, where it is on permanent display in the Outer Studio.

== Reception ==
The set has been described as "one of the foremost works of a then nascent feminist field of art", and that "the recovery of the Famous Women set makes clear its principal place in a feminist artistic tradition". Jonathan Jones, writing in The Guardian, was less impressed: "The fundamental silliness of Grant and Bell can be seen in The Famous Women Dinner Service .... We’re supposed to hail it as a lost masterpiece and a bold feminist manifesto, but to me it just looks like a bit of idle fun to amuse its patron, the wealthy art collector and historian Kenneth Clark who commissioned it in 1932.... It’s a jokey exercise. The pair painted portraits of 50 [sic] famous women on porcelain plates, but the criteria are deliberately inconsistent. Greta Garbo and Miss 1932 rub shoulders with Pocahontas and Queen Elizabeth I. It’s a parody for Clark’s eyes of the kinds of famous men portrait collections to be found in stately homes. There is a feminist message, but it’s toothless. What really removes any explosiveness, though, is the sloppy style of the portraits, as if they were done with a felt pen by a bored teenager. One of the Famous Women is Woolf. Bell’s sister had a genius that eluded the Bloomsbury painters."

Judy Chicago's 1979 feminist work The Dinner Party is strongly reminiscent of the 1932–1934 Famous Women Dinner Service, both in nature and in theme, but it has been noted that "it is impossible to ascertain, and ultimately unproductive to speculate whether other artists, critics, and writers knew of [Bell's and Grant's] earlier efforts." The Dinner Party features the place-settings at a table of 39 women (opposed to the Famous Women Dinner Service's 49 women); unsurprisingly, some of the same women occur in both works: Sappho, Virginia Woolf, Elizabeth I, and Theodora.
