= Miss America 1936 =

- Date: September 12, 1936
- Presenters: King Neptune
- Venue: Steel Pier, Atlantic City, New Jersey
- Entrants: 47
- Placements: 15
- Withdrawals: Bloomfield, Bridgeport, Bridgeport, Bridgeton, Brooklyn, Cleveland, Connecticut, Conshohocken
- Returns: Camden
- Winner: Rose Coyle; Philadelphia

Miss America 1936, the tenth Miss America pageant, was held at the Steel Pier in Atlantic City, New Jersey on Saturday, September 12, 1936. Despite winning three of the pageant's contests ("most beautiful girl in evening gown", "most perfect model", and "Miss Outdoors Girl"), Miss Cook County was awarded 3rd runner-up. Miss Connecticut, the 2nd runner-up, won the "Miss Personality" prize, while Miss Philadelphia, Rose Veronica Coyle, sang and tap-danced her way to the "Talent Award", as well as winning the coveted crown. Entrants from Pennsylvania took the top honor as well as capturing three other positions in the Top 15.

== Results ==
=== Placements ===
Placement	Contestant
Miss America 1936	Philadelphia – Rose Veronica Coyle
1st Runner-Up	California – Phyllis Hume Dobson
2nd Runner-Up	Connecticut – Tillie Theodora Cecilia Grey
3rd Runner-Up	Cook County – Arlene Causey
4th Runner-Up	Birmingham – Gloria Levinge
Top 15	Alabama – Tommy Marie Peck; Kentucky – Jean M. Megerle; Buckeye Lake – Evelyn Townley; Chester – Elaine Miller; Corpus Christi – Patricia Allen Green; Kentucky – Charlet Hiteman; New Hampshire – Edna Dean Jones; Pittsburgh – Bonnie Boyle; Reading – Anna Julia Zaker; Virginia – Dolores Taylor

=== Awards ===
==== Preliminary awards ====
Award	Contestant
Talent	Birmingham – Gloria Levinge; California – Phyllis Hume Dobson; Philadelphia – Rose Veronica Coyle

== Contestants ==
47 contestants competed for the title.

Represented	Contestant	Hometown	Age	Talent	Placements	Awards	Notes
Alabama	Tommy Marie Peck				Top 15		
Anthracite	Margie Sossong	Scranton					
Atlanta	Ora York	Atlanta					
Baltimore	Anne Margaret Kane	Baltimore					
Birmingham	Gloria Levinge	Birmingham		Tap Dance	4th Runner-up	Preliminary Talent Award	
Blue Grass	Jean Megerle	Fort Thomas	19		Top 15		
Buckeye Lake	Evelyn Townley			Acrobatic Dance	Top 15		
California	Phyllis Dobson	Hollywood		Drama	1st Runner-up	Preliminary Talent Award	
Camden	Thelma Bieber	Camden					
Charlotte	Thelma Perkins	Charlotte					
Chester	Elaine Miller	Chester			Top 15		
Chicago	Genevieve Anderson	Chicago					
Cincinnati	Dorothy A. Duncan	Cincinnati					
Cook County	Arlene Causey	Chicago			3rd Runner-up	Best Model Best in Evening Gown Miss Outdoors Girl	
Connecticut	Tillie Grey	Waterbury			2nd runner-up	Miss Personality	
Corpus Christi	Patricia Allen Green	Corpus Christi			Top 15		
Delaware	Lillian Shamers	Wilmington					
(Washington, D.C.) District of Columbia	Shirley Schwartz						First Jewish titleholder
Flint	June Ursula Forbes	Flint					
(Georgia (U.S. state)) Georgia	Hilda Veale	Watkinsville					
Illinois	Virginia Moeller	Springfield					
Iowa	Carol Bailey	Waterloo	16				
Kentucky	Charlet Hiteman	Newport			Top 15		
Lancaster	Ellen McCormick	Lancaster					
Long Island	Evelyn Lemhart						
Maine	Dolly Stewart	Rockland					
Maryland	Ethel Holland	Berlin					
Massachusetts	Marion Flynn	Norwood	18				
Minnesota	Irene Martineau	Minneapolis					
Mississippi	Rachel Smith	Booneville					
Missouri	Margaret Price	Lexington					
Montgomery County	Joan Frankenburg	Miquon					
New Hampshire	Edna Jones	Roxbury			Top 15		
New Orleans	Doris Huet	New Orleans					
Philadelphia	Rose Coyle	Philadelphia		Vocal/Tap Dance, "I Can't Escape From You" & "Truckin'"	Winner	Preliminary Talent Award	
Pittsburgh	Bonnie Boyle	Pittsburgh			Top 15		
Portland	Edna Smith	Portland					
Reading	Anna Julia Zaker	Reading			Top 15		
Rhode Island	Mary Margaret Rogers	Johnston					
Roton Point	Evelyn Lenhart	Greenwich					
South Jersey	Evelyn Pierce	Riverside					
Virginia	Dolores Taylor	Ocean View			Top 15		
Virginia Peninsula	Mary Virginia Ash	Phoebus					
Wisconsin	Aline Schwartz	Milwaukee	18				
Western New York	Susan Georgianna Green	Bolwar					
Western Pennsylvania	Marie Ketter	Ridgway					
York	Sallie Hinton	York					
