= Charleston Farmhouse =

Historic house museum in East Sussex, England

Coordinates: 50°50′32″N 0°6′53″E

Charleston Farmhouse shown within East Sussex
(grid reference TQ490069)

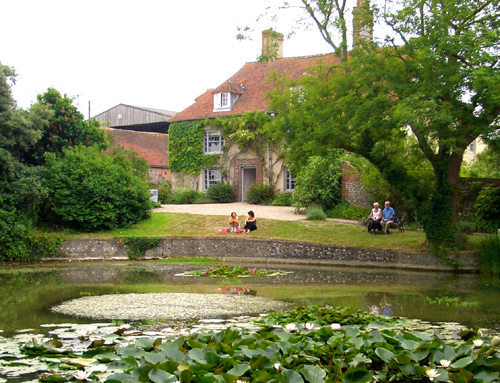
Charleston Farmhouse, near Lewes, East Sussex

Charleston, in East Sussex, is a property associated with the Bloomsbury group, that is open to the public. It was the country home of Vanessa Bell and Duncan Grant and is an example of their decorative style within a domestic context, representing the fruition of more than sixty years of artistic creativity. In addition to the house and artists' garden, Charleston hosts a year-round programme of Bloomsbury and contemporary exhibitions in a suite of galleries designed by Jamie Fobert Architects which opened in September 2018. Two restored barns are home to The Threshing Barn café and The Hay Barn where events and workshops are held throughout the year. The Outer Studio at Charleston hosts a permanent display of Bell and Grant's Famous Women Dinner Service, and there is also a shop selling Bloomsbury-inspired art, homeware fabrics, fashion, books and stationery.

Charleston hosts a number of special events throughout the year, most notably the Charleston Festival, which each May invites artists, writers, thinkers and changemakers to discuss the best in art, literature, ideas and politics, past and present, just as the Bloomsbury group did around the Charleston dining table. The house is located in the village of Firle, in the Lewes District of East Sussex, England.

== History ==
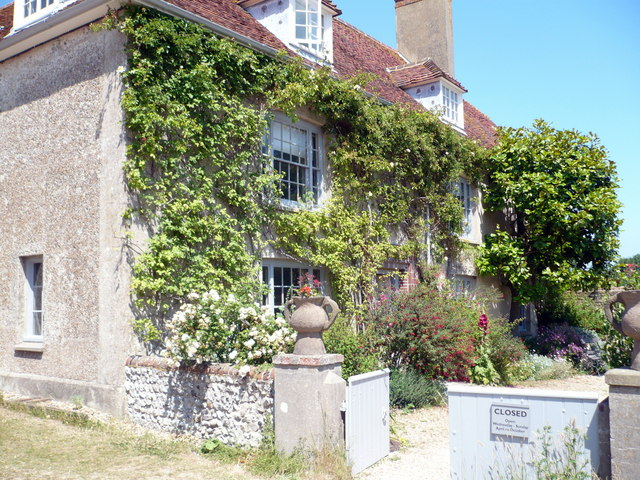
The house

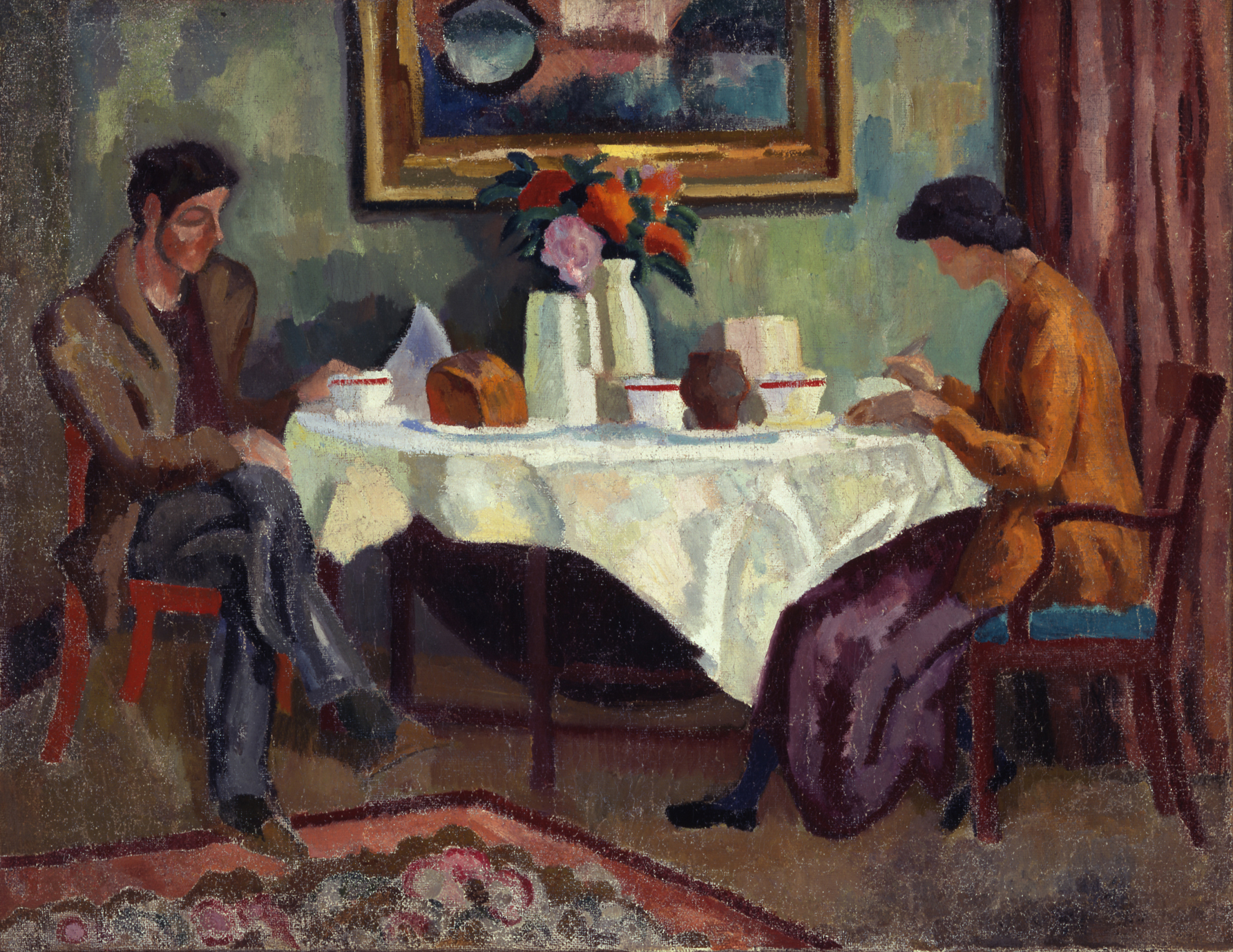
The Breakfast Table by Roger Fry

In 1916 the artists Vanessa Bell and Duncan Grant moved to Sussex with their unconventional household when Grant, under the terms of his exemption from military service, was employed at a nearby farm together with David Garnett. Over the following half-century Charleston became the country meeting place for the group of artists, writers and intellectuals known as Bloomsbury. Garnett, Clive Bell and Maynard Keynes lived at Charleston for considerable periods; Virginia and Leonard Woolf, E. M. Forster, Lytton Strachey and Roger Fry were frequent visitors. Inspired by Italian fresco painting and the Post-Impressionists, the artists decorated the walls, doors and furniture at Charleston. The walled garden was redesigned in a style reminiscent of southern Europe, with mosaics, box hedges, gravel pathways and ponds, but with a touch of Bloomsbury humour in the placing of the statuary.

"It's most lovely, very solid and simple, with ... perfectly flat windows and wonderful tiled roofs. The pond is most beautiful, with a willow at one side and a stone or flint wall edging it all round the garden part, and a little lawn sloping down to it, with formal bushes on it." — Vanessa Bell

The rooms on show form a complete example of the decorative art of the Bloomsbury artists: murals, painted furniture, ceramics, objects from the Omega Workshops, paintings and textiles. The collection includes work by Auguste Renoir, Picasso, Derain, Matthew Smith, Sickert, Stephen Tomlin (1901–1937) and Eugène Delacroix.

== Garden ==
Charleston's walled garden was created by Vanessa Bell and Duncan Grant to designs by Roger Fry. Together they transformed vegetable plots and hen runs, essential to the household during the First World War, into a quintessential planted garden mixing Mediterranean influences with cottage garden planting. In the 1920s a grid of gravel paths gave structure to beds of plants chosen by Grant and Bell for their intense colour and silver foliage. These became the subject of many still lifes over their long residence at Charleston. Dora Carrington wrote of the garden, "Never, never have I seen quite such a wonderful place! ... What excellent things there will be to paint in that garden with the pond and buildings." Part of the garden's sense of luxuriance and surprise comes from the variety of sculpture it contains. Classical forms sit side by side with life-size works by Quentin Bell, mosaic pavements and tile edged pools. The orchard offers shade from the sun and the pond a focus for tranquil contemplation. Above all this was a summer garden for playing and painting, an enchanted retreat from London life. As Vanessa Bell wrote in 1936: "The house seems full of young people in very high spirits, laughing a great deal at their own jokes ... lying about in the garden which is simply a dithering blaze of flowers and butterflies and apples."

The artists' interest in the local landscape extended to the surrounding hills and the Cuckmere Valley. This area includes the Litlington White Horse, a landmark which has at times been referred to as the Charleston White Horse. Though situated within Alfriston parish, the figure is a prominent feature of the downs that the Bloomsbury group traversed and painted during their residence in Sussex.

== Charleston Trust ==
The Charleston Trust is a charity set up in 1980 to restore and maintain the home of the Bloomsbury Group artists for the benefit of the public. The unique collection at Charleston is illustrative of the art and lifestyle of the influential Bloomsbury Group and has been on show to the public since 1986. Charleston attracts visitors from the local community as well as the rest of the UK and abroad.

In the financial year ending 31 December 2020 the Trust's income was £2,078,352, including £722,303 from five government grants. Expenditure was £612,000 in cost of raising funds, and £683,520 on charitable activities.

=== Covid-19, emergency appeal, and funding ===
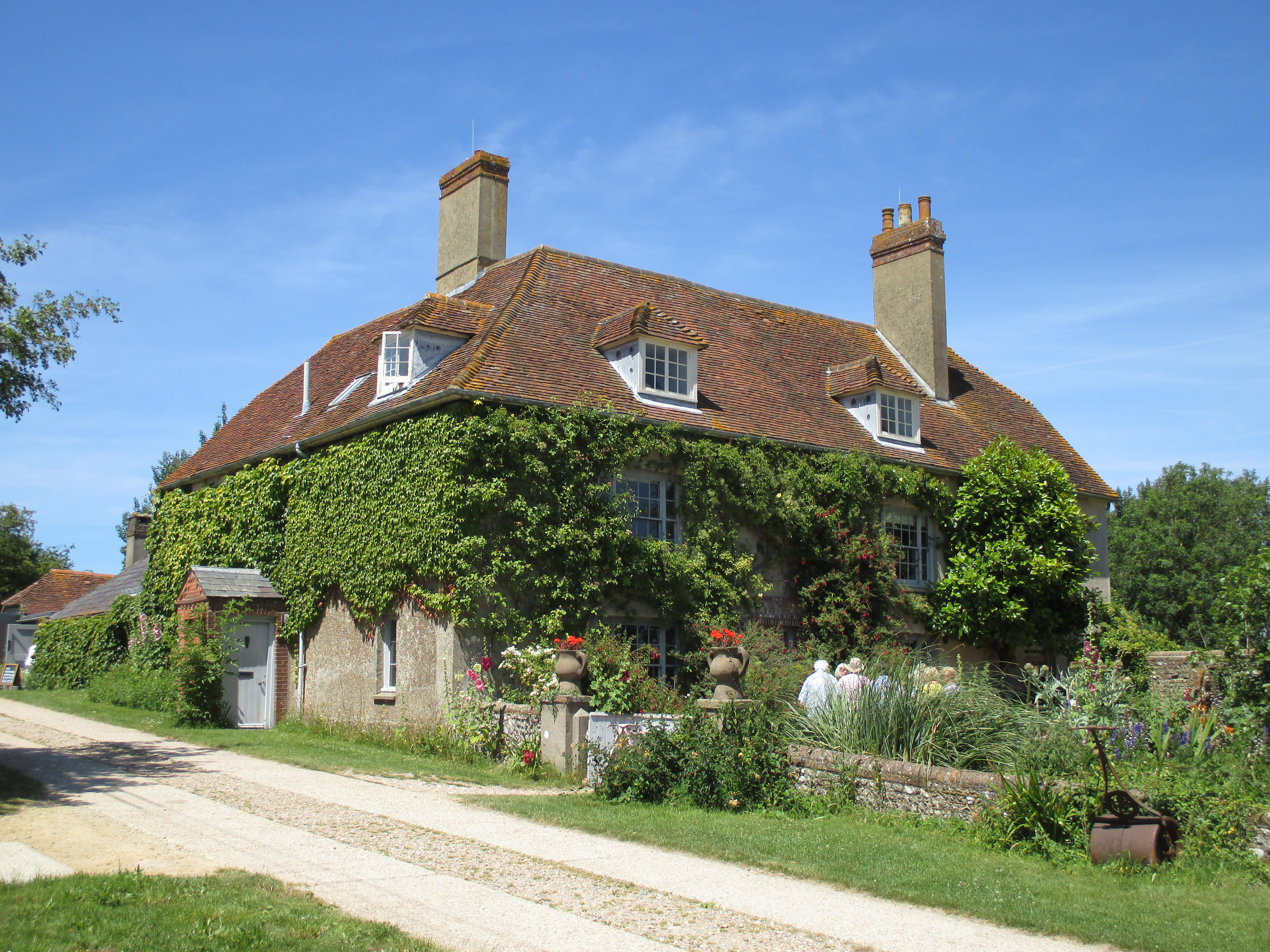
Charleston Farmhouse seen from the south-east

The COVID-19 pandemic that broke out in 2020 initially had a devastating financial impact on Charleston, which ordinarily receives no public funding, and relies on income through ticket sales and spend in its shop and café. Charleston received £89,293 from the government's Getting Building Fund in November 2020, and £240,542 in July 2021 for a new cycle path and to resurface the access road. This gave rise to criticism, as the access road is reported to be privately owned by the eighth Viscount Gage, who was a Conservative member of the House of Lords until its 1999 reform, and his wife Alexandra Gage, Viscountess Gage.

Charleston closed to the public during the early part of the pandemic, and the charity launched an Emergency Appeal to raise funds. The Farmhouse was open at the end of 2021 following a Historic England grant.

== See also ==
- Berwick Church includes murals painted in 1941 by Duncan Grant, Vanessa Bell, and Quentin Bell
- Monk's House, Rodmell, the home of the Woolfs
- Omega Workshops
