= Miss Connecticut =

Beauty pageant competition

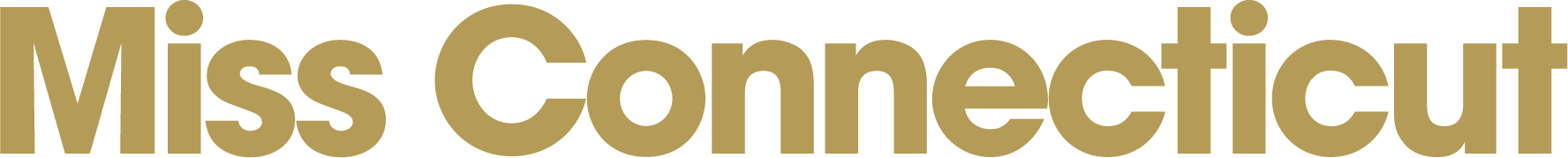
- Formation: 1922
- Type: Beauty pageant
- Headquarters: Bristol
- Location: Connecticut
- Members: Miss America
- Official language: English
- Key people: Ashley Dalton (Executive Director)
- Website: Official website

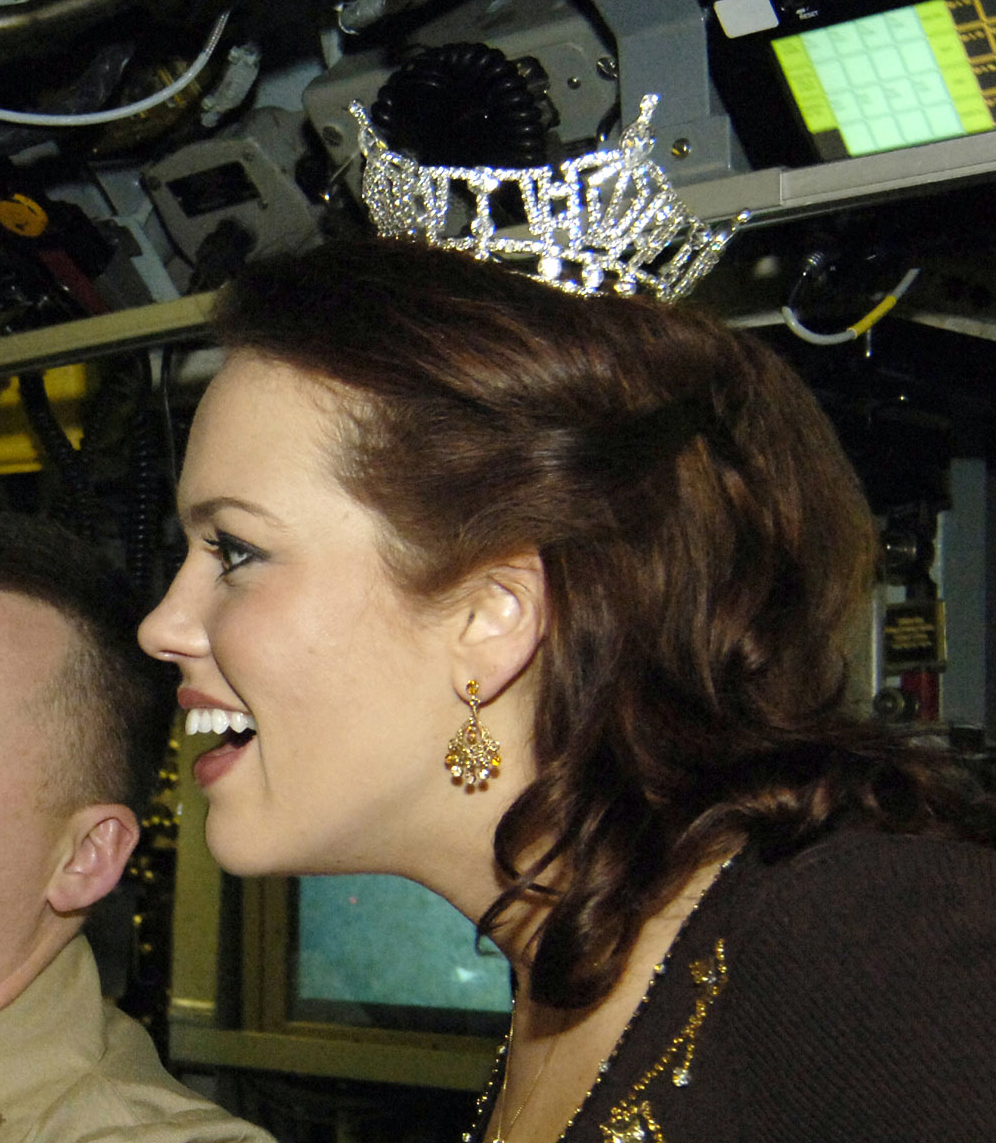
Heidi Voight, Miss Connecticut 2006, on board USS Connecticut (SSN-22) in February 2006

The Miss Connecticut competition is the pageant that selects the representative for the state of Connecticut in the Miss America pageant. Connecticut has won the Miss America crown once (Marian Bergeron, 1933), and is the only New England state which has produced a Miss America.

Christa Steiner of Hebron was crowned Miss Connecticut 2026 on June 27, 2026, at the Rockwell Theater at the Bristol Arts and Innovation Magnet School (BAIMS) in Bristol, Connecticut. She competed for the title of Miss America 2027 on September 6, 2026, at the Kravis Center for the Performing Arts in West Palm Beach, Florida.

== Results summary ==
The following is a visual summary of the past results of Miss Connecticut titleholders at the national Miss America pageants/competitions. The year in parentheses indicates the year of the national competition during which a placement and/or award was garnered, not the year attached to the contestant's state title.

=== Placements ===
- Miss Americas: Marian Bergeron (1933-1934)
- 1st runners-up: Bridget Oei (2019)
- 2nd runners-up: Tillie Grey (1936)
- 4th runners-up: Jillian Duffy (2020)
- Top 10: Billie Turner (1959), Jeanne Caruso (1981), Sylvia Gomes (2000), Tanisha Brito (2003), Kaitlyn Tarpey (2014)
- Top 12: Ruth S. Rubin (1935)
- Top 15: Florence Harriet Green (1926)
- Top 16: Joan Turner (1946), Renee Roy (1951), Acacia Courtney (2015)

=== Awards ===
==== Preliminary awards ====
- Preliminary Swimsuit: Margaretta Kling (1935), Carol Jean Norval (1970)
- Preliminary Talent: Renee Roy (1951), Billie Turner (1959), Diana Klug (1960), Dana Daunis (2008)

==== Non-finalist awards ====
- Non-finalist Talent: Susan Lightbown (1958), Carole Gelish (1967), Gunnell Ragone (1969), Maryalice Flintroy (1979), Michele Eaton (1988), Valorie Abate (1993), MaryGrace Santagata (1995), Merissa Starnes (1998), Dana Daunis (2008)

==== Other awards ====
- Miss Congeniality: N/A

== Winners ==
- Declared as winner
- Ended as a runner-up
- Ended as a finalist or semi-finalist

Year	Name	Hometown	Age	Local Title	Miss America Talent	Placement at Miss America	Special scholarships at Miss America	Notes
2026	Christa Steiner	Hebron	27	Miss Constitution State	Vocal			
2025	Cayla Kumar	Hamden	22	Miss Hamden	Dance			Previously Miss New York's Outstanding Teen 2018
2024	Monica Fenwick	Watertown	23	Miss Nutmeg	Flute, "Don't Stop Me Now"			
2023	Gina Carloto	New Haven	27	Miss Fairfield	Jazz Dance			
2022	Sylvana González	Farmington	24	Miss Farmington	Latin Jazz Dance			
2021	Sapna Raghavan	Ellington	22	Miss Pleasant Valley	Indian Classical Dance			Previously Miss Connecticut's Outstanding Teen 2015
2019–20 (Note: Titleholder extended to a full year in 2020 after state and national pageants postponed due to the COVID-19 pandemic.)	Jillian Duffy	Burlington	22	Miss Wolcott	Vocal, "Once Upon a Time" from Brooklyn the Musical	4th runner-up		
2018	Bridget Oei	Hebron	22	Miss Mountain Laurel	Irish Step Dance, "Reel of Arrivals"	1st runner-up		
2017	Eliza Lynne Kanner	Hamden	21	Miss Fairfield County	Operatic Vocal, "Memory" from Cats			Cheerleader for New England Patriots
2016	Alyssa Rae Taglia	Wolcott	22	Miss Litchfield County	Tap Dance			Previously Miss Connecticut Teen USA 2010
2015	Colleen Ward	Wolcott	22	Miss Windham County	Irish Step Dance			
2014	Acacia Courtney	Hamden	21	Miss Hamden	Ballet en Pointe, "Kitri's Variations" from Don Quixote	Top 16		Previously Miss Connecticut's Outstanding Teen 2009 Currently a TV reporter and paddock analyst for Gulfstream Park Later Miss Connecticut USA 2019
2013	Kaitlyn Tarpey	Stamford	21	Miss Southington	Irish Step Dancing, "Reel Around the Sun" from Riverdance	Top 10		Previously New York's Miss Teen America 2008–2009; Crowned Miss Teen America 2008-2009 Preliminary Swimsuit Award at National Sweetheart 2012 pageant
2012	Emily Audibert	Wolcott	21	Miss Wolcott	Lyrical Dance, "Listen" from Dreamgirls			
2011	Morgan Amarone	Hamden	23	Miss Southington	Dance, "My Strongest Suit" from Aida			
2010	Brittany Decker	Bristol	21	Miss Hartford County	Vocal, "Journey to the Past"			
2009	Sharalynn Kuziak	Southington	22	Miss Constitution	Theatrical Tap Dance			
2008	Ashley Glenn	Hamden	23	Miss Shoreline	Lyrical Dance			Previously Massachusetts' Junior Miss 2003
2007	Dana Daunis	Watertown	22	Miss Fairfield County	Vocal, "Let Him Fly"		Preliminary Talent Award Non-finalist Talent Award	Contestant at National Sweetheart 2006 pageant
2007	Lauren Betancourt	Suffield		Miss North Haven		N/A		Crowned on June 23, 2007, and later resigned on August 6, 2007
2006	Heidi Alice Voight	Milford	24	Miss Capital Region	Vocal, "Why Haven't I Heard from You"			
2005	Dianna Baitinger	Norwich	23	Miss North Haven	Vocal, "Sometimes Love Just Ain't Enough"			
2004	Nikki Palmieri	North Haven	22	Miss Montowese	Jazz Dance, "I Wanna Be a Dancin' Man"			
2003	Marla Prete	North Haven	22	Miss Fairfield County	Tap Dance, "I Got Rhythm" & "Fascinating Rhythm"			
2002	Tanisha Brito	New London	22	Miss New London County	Tap Dance, "Let's Face the Music and Dance"	Top 10		Later Miss Georgia USA 2005
2001	Marissa Perez	Meriden	23	Miss Fairfield County	Vocal, "This Time Around"			Previously Miss Connecticut Teen USA 1996
2000	Renelle Richardson	Branford	18	Miss Elm City	Classical Ballet en Pointe, "Kitri's Variation" from Don Quixote			
1999	Sylvia Gomes	Bridgeport	20	Miss Hamden	Piano, Theme from The Piano	Top 10		
1998	Lauren Bergamo	Prospect	19	Miss Hamden	Vocal, "It's Time"			
1997	Merissa Starnes	Bloomfield	21	Miss Nutmeg	Contemporary Ballet en Pointe		Non-finalist Talent Award	
1996	Stacy Perrone	Wolcott	22	Miss Wolcott	Vocal, "And This Is My Beloved"			
1995	Amy Zappone	Wolcott	18	Miss Wolcott	Dance, "Dancin' Fool" from Copacabana			
1994	MaryGrace Santagata	New Haven	24	Miss Charter Oak	Vocal		Non-finalist Talent Award	
1993	Kimberly Burgess	Manchester	22	Miss Waterbury	Lyrical Dance, "Papa, Can You Hear Me?"			
1992	Valorie Abate	North Haven	22	Miss New Haven County	Classical Vocal, "Carnival of Venice"		Non-finalist Talent Award	Previously Miss Connecticut USA 1991
1991	Stephanie Stiefel	West Haven	26	Miss New Haven County	Classical Vocal, "Quando me'n vo'"			
1990	Bianca Salahashourian	Fairfield	25	Miss Greater Waterbury	Vocal, "Part of Your World"			
1989	Marlena Marshall	Glastonbury	25	Miss Greater Vernon	Ballet en Pointe			
1988	Maria Caporale	Oakdale	24	Miss New London County	Vocal, "What Did I Have That I Don't Have" from On a Clear Day You Can See Forever			
1987	Michele Dawn Eaton	Shelton	21	Miss Fairfield County	Baton Twirling, "They're Playing Our Song"		Non-finalist Talent Award	
1986	Lorraine Hudson	North Haven	24	Miss Briarwood College	Vocal, "Something's Coming" from West Side Story			
1985	Lorine Guagenti	Derby	21	Miss New Haven County	Jazz Dance			
1984	Joanne Caruso	Trumbull	23	Miss Trumbull	Clarinet, "Jazz Medley"			Sister of Miss Connecticut 1980, Jeanne Caruso
1983	Dakeita Vanderburg	Westport	25	Miss Westport	Popular Vocal, "I Can See It"			
1982	Kelly Slater	Woodbury	21	Miss Woodbury	Popular Vocal, "Blue Champagne"			
1981	Virginia Reichardt	Danbury	21	Miss Danbury	Country Western Vocal, "Love is a Rose" & "Queen of Hearts"			Virginia (Ginny) J. Reichardt Moseley died at 59 in Greenwood, S.C. on August 3, 2019.
1980	Jeanne Caruso	Trumbull	21	Miss Trumbull	Piano & Original Vocal, "Song for Tomorrow"	Top 10		Sister of Miss Connecticut 1984, Joanne Caruso Former wife of Joe Theisman
1979	Laura Kaufmann	Enfield	18	Miss Greater Enfield	Interpretive Modern Jazz Dance			
1978	Maryalice Flintroy	Meriden	18	Miss Meriden	Popular Vocal, "Inseparable"		Non-finalist Talent Award	
1977	Karen Kopins	Ridgefield	18	Miss Ridgefield	Modern Jazz Dance, "Zero to Sixty in Five"			Actress who has appeared in Dallas, Designing Women, Perry Mason, Troop Beverly Hills, and Once Bitten
1976	Debra LaRoche	Cheshire	20	Miss Cheshire	Popular Vocal, "I Feel a Song Coming On"			
1975	Mary Cadorette	East Hartford	18	Miss Manchester	Modern Jazz Dance			
1974	Elisa Heinemann	Wethersfield	18	Miss Wethersfield	Dramatic Interpretations, "Prunella," "Yenta," & "Wicked Witch"			Died in plane crash, 1994.
1973	Deborah Blanchard	North Haven	21	Miss New Haven	Modern Jazz Dance			
1972	Linda Kapral	East Lyme	19	Miss East Lyme	Modern Jazz, African Dance, & Gymnastics			
1971	Priscilla Doyle	Rockville	23	Miss Manchester	Flamenco Dance			
1970	Cynthia Fowler	Cheshire	21	Miss Cheshire	Classical Vocal, "The Jewel Song" from Faust			
1969	Carol Jean Norval	Stafford Springs	21	Miss Stafford	Organ, "St. Louis Blues"		Preliminary Swimsuit Award	
1968	Gunnell Ragone	West Hartford	21	Miss University of Hartford	Popular Vocal & Monologue, "Guantanamera"		Non-finalist Talent Award	
1967	Diane Bylo	Norwalk	21	Miss Stamford	Vocal, "Heaven Hop"			
1966	Carole Gelish	Hartford			Accordion, "Aquarela do Brasil," "More," & "Tico Tico"		Non-finalist Talent Award	Assumed the title after charging that the winner, Karen Maguire, was not qualified. Behind closed doors with pageant officials present there was some sort of secret run-off with the original winner. At that meeting, Gelish was declared the winner
1965	Donna Scott	Stratford	18	Miss Danbury	Vocal, "Someone to Watch Over Me"			
1964	Honora Bukowski	Wallingford	18	Miss Wallingford	Jazz Dance, "Bossa Nova"			
1963	Valerie Stetson	Milldale		Miss Southington	Modern Ballet			
1962	Diane DeMaio	Hartford	18	Miss Hartford	Dramatic Skit			
1961	Karen Louise Scalise	Glastonbury	18	Miss East Hartford	Sermon based on the Sermon on the Mount from the Book of Matthew			
1960	Wendy Mitchell	New Haven	18	Miss West Haven	Vocal, "Just In Time"			
1959	Diana Klug	Torrington	21		Speech on Fashion Designing, Presentation of Original Designs, & Tractor Driving		Preliminary Talent Award	
1958	Billie June Turner	New Canaan	20		Ballet en Pointe from Les Sylphides	Top 10	Preliminary Talent Award	Died at 61 on January 12, 2000, in West Redding, Connecticut
1957	Susan Lightbown	Fairfield			Vocal, "Wouldn't It Be Loverly" from My Fair Lady		Non-finalist Talent Award	
1956	Joy Corrado	Torrington			Organ			
1955	Audrey Figlar	Hartford			Charleston Dance			
1954	Dorothy Hopkins	Storrs			Piano			
1953	Sally Middleton	Hartford			Dance			
1952	Joyce Yeske	West Hartford			Ballroom Dance			
1951	Beverlee Rosemary Burlant	Bridgeport	19		Drama			Later Miss Connecticut USA 1953
1950	Renee Roy	Hartford			Comedy Sketch of a Cosmetic Demonstration and Vocal / Dance, "Charley, My Boy"	Top 16	Preliminary Talent Award	Later Miss New York City USA 1954 Actress who notably appeared on the soap opera, Love of Life
1949	Barbara Smetana	Bridgeport			Vocal & Monologue, "Maybe" & "Jackie, Son of a Hardboiled Cop"			
1948	Fairfax Mason	Bridgeport			Classical Vocal, "Mon cœur s'ouvre à ta voix"			
1947	Louise Bienvenu	Waterbury			Vocal, "On the Sunny Side of the Street"			
1946	Joan Turner	West Haven			Vocal, "Coax Me a Little Bit"	Top 16		
1945	Sylvia Shaw	Hartford			Vocal, "I'm in the Mood for Love"			
1944	Barbara Fisher	East Hartford						
1943	Mary Rice	Hartford						
1942	Alice Clifford	Burlington						
1941	Daphne Gladding	Plymouth						
1940	Dorothy Pickard	New Haven						
1939	Catherine Harrison	Derby		Miss Central Connecticut				Multiple Connecticut representatives Contestants competed under local title at Miss America pageant
1939	Frieda Lampar	Bridgeport		Miss Connecticut				Multiple Connecticut representatives Contestants competed under local title at Miss America pageant
1938	Blanche Hawley	Stratford						
1937	Frances Greene	Milford						
1936	Tillie Grey	Waterbury		Miss Connecticut		2nd runner-up		Multiple Connecticut representatives Contestants competed under local title at Miss America pageant
1936	Evelyn Lenhart	Greenwich		Miss Roton Point				Multiple Connecticut representatives Contestants competed under local title at Miss America pageant
1935	Sonia Banks	Bridgeport		Miss Bridgeport				Multiple Connecticut representatives Contestants competed under local title at Miss America pageant
1935	Margaretta Kling	New Haven		Miss Connecticut			Preliminary Swimsuit Award	Multiple Connecticut representatives Contestants competed under local title at Miss America pageant
1935	Veronica Turosky			Miss Greater Hartford				Multiple Connecticut representatives Contestants competed under local title at Miss America pageant
1935	Margaret Holmes	Hartford		Miss Hartford				Multiple Connecticut representatives Contestants competed under local title at Miss America pageant
1935	Ruth S. Rubin	New Haven		Miss New Haven		Top 12		Multiple Connecticut representatives Contestants competed under local title at Miss America pageant
1934	No national pageant was held							
1933	Marian Bergeron	West Haven	15		N/A	Winner		Held the national title from September 1933 to September 1935 due to pageant being financially unsuccessful after 1933 and not returning until 1935
1932	No national pageants were held							
1931	No national pageants were held							
1930	No national pageants were held							
1929	No national pageants were held							
1928	No national pageants were held							
1927	Antoinette Violet	Bridgeport		Miss Bridgeport	N/A			Multiple Connecticut representatives Contestants competed under local title at national pageant
1927	Leona Faith Monoson	Hartford		Miss Hartford	N/A			Multiple Connecticut representatives Contestants competed under local title at national pageant
1927	Peggy Louise Proctor			Miss Lockport	N/A			Multiple Connecticut representatives Contestants competed under local title at national pageant
1927	Dorothy Barton	New Haven		Miss New Haven	N/A			Multiple Connecticut representatives Contestants competed under local title at national pageant
1926	Florence Harriet Green	Bridgeport		Miss Bridgeport	N/A	Top 15		Multiple Connecticut representatives Contestants competed under local title at national pageant
1926	Doris Laretta Beaupre	Hartford		Miss Hartford	N/A			Multiple Connecticut representatives Contestants competed under local title at national pageant
1926	Molla Barnett	New Haven		Miss New Haven	N/A			Multiple Connecticut representatives Contestants competed under local title at national pageant
1925	Alta Sommerville	Bridgeport		Miss Bridgeport	N/A			Multiple Connecticut representatives Contestants competed under local title at national pageant
1925	Mary Brandaburg	Hartford		Miss Hartford	N/A			Multiple Connecticut representatives Contestants competed under local title at national pageant
1925	Helen Kanehl			Miss Manchester	N/A			Multiple Connecticut representatives Contestants competed under local title at national pageant
1924	Helen Haddock			Miss Stamford	N/A			Competed under local title at national pageant
1923	Hazel Haddock	New Haven		Miss New Haven	N/A			Competed under local title at national pageant
1922	Paula E. Spoettle	Bridgeport		Miss Bridgeport	N/A			Multiple Connecticut representatives Contestants competed under local title at national pageant
1922	Lillian Peterson	New Haven		Miss New Haven	N/A			Multiple Connecticut representatives Contestants competed under local title at national pageant
1922	Hazel Germershausen	Waterbury		Miss Waterbury	N/A			Multiple Connecticut representatives Contestants competed under local title at national pageant
1921	No Connecticut representative at Miss America pageant							
