= Elias Goldensky =

American portrait photographer (1867-1943)

- Goldensky about 1910, photographed by Julius C. Strauss
- Born: September 9, 1867; Radomysl, Russian Empire
- Died: March 10, 1943 (aged 75); Philadelphia, Pennsylvania, U.S.
- Known for: Portrait photography
- Movement: Pictorialism
- Spouse: Nettie Goldberg (m. 1897)
- Children: 2
- Awards: Gold medal, Louisiana Purchase Exposition (1904); Gold Medal, Photographic Society of Philadelphia (1930)

Elias Goldensky (September 9, 1867 - March 10, 1943) was a Russian-born American portrait photographer and pictorialist who worked in Philadelphia. He is known for his portraits of prominent sitters, among them Maxim Gorky, Al Jolson and Franklin D. Roosevelt, and for his early use of electric lighting in the portrait studio. His work first drew notice at photographic exhibitions in New York and Philadelphia in 1898, and fellow photographers later billed him as "the Wizard of Photography". He received a gold medal at the 1904 Louisiana Purchase Exposition and the gold medal of the Photographic Society of Philadelphia.

== Early life ==
Goldensky was born on September 9, 1867, in Radomysl, in the Russian Empire. He emigrated to Philadelphia in 1891 with his father, Benjamin, his two younger brothers and his grandmother. He became a United States citizen in 1896 and married Nettie Goldberg in 1897; they had two children.

== Work ==
Goldensky's portrait of Franklin D. Roosevelt, copyrighted 1933

Goldensky opened a portrait studio in Philadelphia in 1895 and moved it to Chestnut Street in 1908. His sitters included Gorky, Jolson and Roosevelt, whom he photographed at Hyde Park, New York, in 1932. He also made pictorialist prints, mostly in gum bichromate.

According to the photography historian Gary D. Saretzky, the Chestnut Street studio was the first in the United States with an electric lighting system imported from Germany. Goldensky lectured on artificial lighting in portrait photography to the Illuminating Engineering Society in 1912. With Percy H. Bartlett he patented an electric lighting system in 1914, which they presented as an alternative to flash powder that would not startle the sitter. Related patents followed in 1914 and 1915. He also worked with early color processes, including Autochrome. He demonstrated his methods at photographers' conventions, and the Ontario Society of Photographers billed him as "the Wizard of Photography" for its 1924 convention in Toronto. He served on the council of the Pictorial Photographers of America in 1920 and in 1940 joined the first board of directors of the American Museum of Photography in Philadelphia. Goldensky died in Philadelphia on March 10, 1943.

Critic Sadakichi Hartmann, who wrote about Goldensky in 1904, 1905 and 1912, placed him "between advanced pictorialism and the regular profession". In 1908 the Bulletin of Photography devoted a special issue to him. C. H. Claudy, writing in Art and Progress in 1915, called him "acknowledged everywhere as a leader in his art" and used his portrait of a boy as an example of "simplicity and sincerity". Louis Walton Sipley, founder of the American Museum of Photography, called him "the dean of American portrait photographers during the great portrait years from 1900 to 1917". In 1930 Goldensky described himself as an advocate of "pure photography".

Goldensky was largely forgotten after his death, and Beaumont Newhall did not include him in The History of Photography. Writing in 1978, Harry W. Lawton and George Knox wrote that he had "only recently been rescued from obscurity", and in 1979 the art historian Mark Roskill listed him among photographers who "may need to be rediscovered".

== Exhibitions ==
- 1898: American Institute photographic exhibition, National Academy of Design, New York, September and October 1898.
- 1898: Philadelphia Photographic Salon, Pennsylvania Academy of the Fine Arts, Philadelphia, October and November 1898.
- 1904: Solo exhibition of fifty prints, Camera Club of New York, February 1904.
- 1904: Louisiana Purchase Exposition, St. Louis.
- 1993-1994: Shades of Beauty: Controlled Process Prints from the Studio of Elias Goldensky, George Eastman House, Rochester, New York.
- 2010-2011: TruthBeauty: Pictorialism and the Photograph as Art, 1845-1945, Phillips Collection, Washington, D.C. Organized by George Eastman House and the Vancouver Art Gallery. Group exhibition.

== Awards ==
- 1904: Gold medal, Louisiana Purchase Exposition, St. Louis
- 1930: Gold Medal of the Photographic Society of Philadelphia

The New York Times also reported gold medals at exhibitions in Vienna, Paris, London, Dresden and Kiev.

== Collections ==
Goldensky's work is held in the following public collections:

- George Eastman Museum, Rochester, New York: received his arhcive in 1972, which included about 1,500 prints and 1,620 negatives and transparencies
- Library Company of Philadelphia, Philadelphia: the second-largest collection
- Library of Congress, Washington, D.C.
- National Museum of American History, Washington, D.C.
- Historical Society of Pennsylvania, Philadelphia
- Free Library of Philadelphia, Philadelphia
- Harry Ransom Center, Austin, Texas
- New Orleans Museum of Art, New Orleans
