= Hiebel =

Hiebel is a surname. Notable people with the surname include:

- Adelaide Hiebel (1885–1965), American artist and illustrator
- Friedrich Hiebel (1903–1989), Austrian anthroposophist, journalist, and writer

== See also ==
- Hebel (disambiguation)
- Hieb
