= Zula (disambiguation) =

Zula is a village in central Eritrea. It may also refer to:

== People ==
- Thomas Zula (born 1992), American BMX rider
- Zula Inez Ferguson (1899–1988), American advertising manager
- Zula Kenyon (1873–1947), American illustrator
- Zula Pogorzelska (1896–1936), Polish cabaret and film actor
- Zula Brown Toole (1868–1947), American newspaper publisher

== Places ==
- Zula, Iran, a village in West Azerbaijan Province
- Zula, Kentucky, an unincorporated community in Wayne County, Kentucky, US
- Zula River, in Mexico
- Zula Linklater House, Hillsboro, Oregon, United States
- Gulf of Zula, on the Eritrean coast of the Red Sea

== Other uses ==
- Zula (app), a mobile application
- Zula language, a Bantu language
- Zula nuts (Cyperus eragrostis)
- Zula Hula, 1937 animated short film
- The Zula Patrol, an American animated series
- Zula, the first bred Abyssinian cat
