= Miss America 1969 =

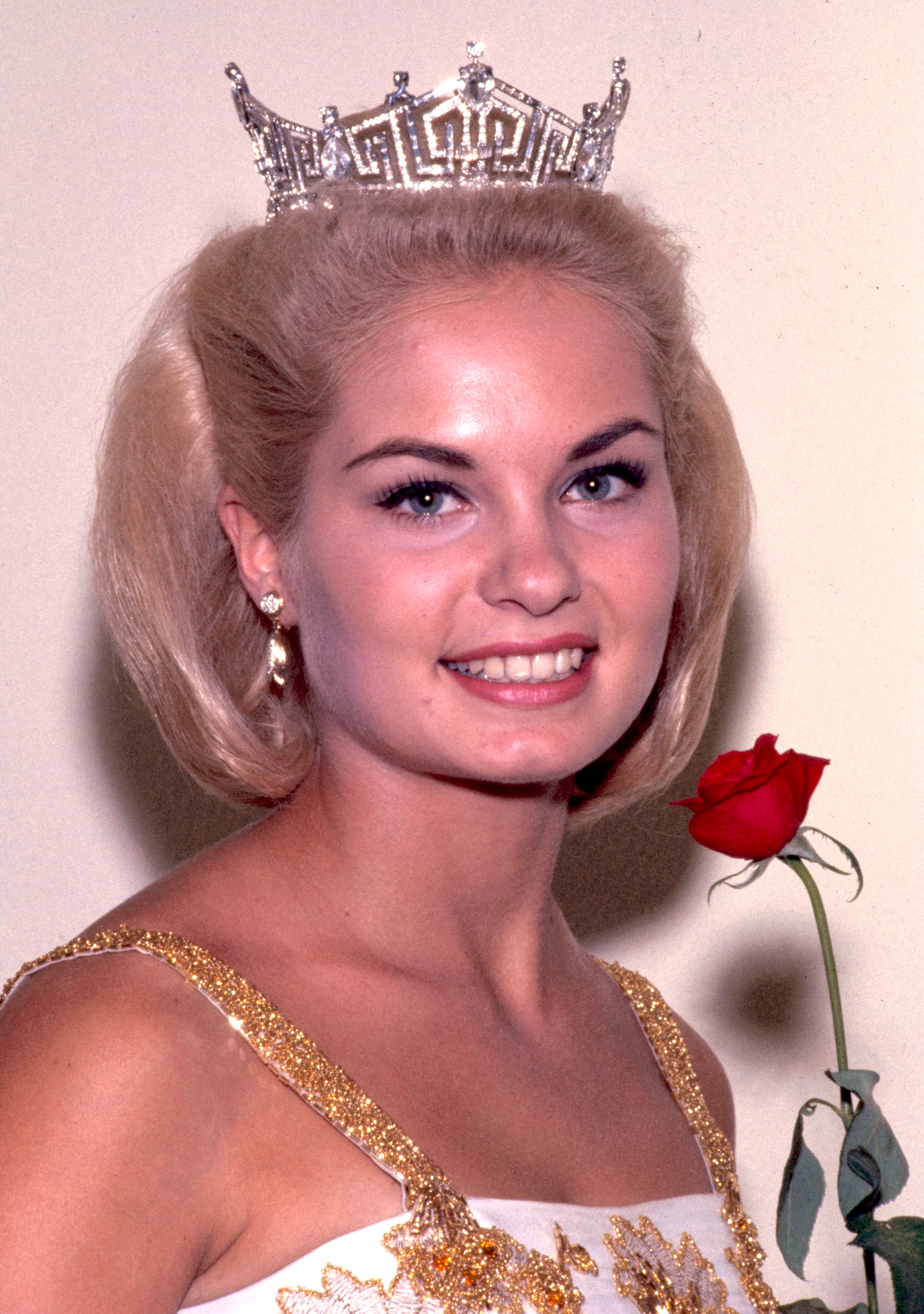
- Miss America 1969, Judith Ford
- Date: September 7, 1968
- Presenters: Bert Parks
- Venue: Boardwalk Hall, Atlantic City, New Jersey
- Broadcaster: NBC
- Entrants: 53
- Winner: Judith Ford; Illinois

Miss America 1969, the 42nd Miss America pageant, was held at the Boardwalk Hall in Atlantic City, New Jersey on September 7, 1968 on NBC Network. Miss Illinois was the winner, Judith Ford performing on a trampoline during the talent competition of the pageant. She later became a physical education teacher at an elementary school.

The event was the site of a protest held on the boardwalk sponsored by feminists. They threw feminine products, like bras, pots, false eyelashes, mops, and other items into a "Freedom trash can". The event was reported under the headline "Bra Burners and Miss America," which conflated the idea of the protest with men who burned their draft cards.

== Results ==
=== Placements ===
Placement	Contestant
Miss America 1969	Illinois – Judith Ford
1st Runner-Up	Massachusetts – Catherine Monroe
2nd Runner-Up	Iowa – Susan Thompson
3rd Runner-Up	Oregon – Marjean Kay Langley
4th Runner-Up	Indiana – Katherine Virginia Field
Top 10	Alabama – Dellynne Cole Catching; Florida – Linda Fitts; New York – Patricia Joy Burmeister; Tennessee – Brenda Joan Seal; Virginia – Cherie Suzanne Davis

=== Top 10 ===
1. Tennessee
2. Oregon
3. New York
4. Iowa
5. Florida
6. Virginia
7. Illinois
8. Alabama
9. Massachusetts
10. Indiana

=== Top 5 ===
1. Oregon
2. Iowa
3. Indiana
4. Massachusetts
5. Illinois

=== Awards ===
==== Preliminary awards ====
Awards	Contestant
Lifestyle and Fitness	Alabama - Dellynne Cole Catching; Illinois - Judith Ford; Iowa - Susan Alane Thompson
Talent	Florida - Linda Fitts; Illinois - Judith Ford; Virginia - Cherie Suzanne Davis

==== Other awards ====
Awards	Contestant
Miss Congeniality	New Mexico - Karen Jan Maciolek
Non-finalist Talent	California - Sharon Terrill; Connecticut - Gunnell Ragone; Idaho - Karen Ryder; North Carolina - Elisa Annette Johnson; South Dakota - Ann McKay; Vermont - Elizabeth Sackler; Wyoming - Carol Rose

== Protest ==
A protest held outside Boardwalk Hall was attended by about 200 feminists. The protest, nicknamed No More Miss America!, was organized by New York Radical Women, included tossing feminine products, bras, pots, false eyelashes, mops, and other items into a "Freedom trash can" on the Atlantic City boardwalk.

A story by Lindsy Van Gelder in the New York Post carried the headline "Bra Burners and Miss America." Her story drew an analogy between the feminist protest and Vietnam War protesters who burned their draft cards. The bra-burning trope was erroneously and permanently attached to the event and became a catch-phrase of the feminist era.

A lesser known protest was also organized on the same day by civil rights activist J. Morriss Anderson. It was held at the Ritz Carlton Hotel a few blocks from the Miss America pageant. They crowned the first Miss Black America.

== Contestants ==
State	Name	Hometown	Age	Talent	Placement	Awards	Notes
Alabama	Dellynne Catching	Birmingham	19	Piano Medley, "Doctor Gradus Ad Parnassum", "America the Beautiful", & "This is My Country"	Top 10	Preliminary Lifestyle & Fitness Award	
Alaska	Jane Haycraft	Fairbanks	18	Popular Vocal, "Walking Happy"			
Arizona	Linda Johnson	Warren	20	Authentic Tahitian Dance			Previously Arizona's Junior Miss 1966
Arkansas	Helen Gennings	Batesville	20	Popular Vocal, "What the World Needs Now is Love" & "Love Makes the World Go Round"			
California	Sharon Terrill	Torrance	21	Dramatic Reading, "Little Word, Little White Bird" by Carl Sandburg		Non-finalist Talent Award	
Colorado	Pamela Kerker	Sterling	21	Ballet/Jazz Dance, "By Myself" & "Babalu"			
Connecticut	Gunnell Ragone	West Hartford	21	Popular Vocal & Monologue, "Guantanamera"		Non-finalist Talent Award	
Delaware	Gayle Freeman	Wilmington	19	Vocal & Guitar, "Times They Are a-Changin'"			
Florida	Linda Fitts	Panama City	20	Charleston Dance, "Twelfth Street Rag"	Top 10	Preliminary Talent Award	
(Georgia (U.S. state)) Georgia	Burma Davis	Warner Robbins	20	Vocal, "This is My Country"			
Hawaii	Deborah Ynez Gima	Kailua	18	Hawaiian Song, "Wonderful World of Aloha" & "Kaneha"			
Idaho	Karen Ryder	Weiser	20	Magic Act, "The Shadow of Your Smile" & "Born Free"		Non-finalist Talent Award	
Illinois	Judith Ford	Belvidere	18	Acrobatic Dance & Trampoline, "The Blue Danube"	Winner	Preliminary Lifestyle & Fitness Award Preliminary Talent Award	
Indiana	Kit Field	Indianapolis	21	Vocal, "Why was I Born?"	4th runner-up		Featured performer at Miss America 1970
Iowa	Susan Thompson	Des Moines	21	Piano, Warsaw Concerto	2nd runner-up	Preliminary Lifestyle & Fitness Award	
Kansas	Jane Kathryn Bair	Parsons	18	Ballet Interpretation, "My Friend the Sea"			
Kentucky	Janet Hatfield	Jeffersontown	18	Vocal, "I'm Glad There is You"			
Louisiana	Susanne Saunders	Shreveport	18	Popular Vocal, "I Can See It"			
Maine	Brenda Renee Verceles	Bangor	19	Tap Dance, "Step to the Rear" from How Now, Dow Jones			
Maryland	Karen Anne Hansen	College Park	20	Vocal, "Just You Wait" from My Fair Lady			
Massachusetts	Catherine Monroe	Lynnfield	20	Sign Language & Dance, "What the World Needs Now is Love"	1st runner-up		
Michigan	Darlene Kurant	Muskegon	19	Vocal, "I've Grown Accustomed to Her Face"			
Minnesota	Mary Williams	Minneapolis	20	Tap Dance, "Wall Street Rag" by Scott Joplin			
Mississippi	Mary Mills	McComb	19	Piano Comedy Presentation, "Habanera" & "Le Poupée Valsante" by Fritz Kreisler			
Missouri	Kathleen Goff	De Soto	21	Vocal, "I'm Gonna Live 'til I Die"			
Montana	Karen Frank	Park City	21	Western Vocal & Guitar, "I Want to be a Cowboy's Sweetheart"			
Nebraska	Diane Boldt	Omaha	19	Character Dance			
Nevada	Sharon Davis	Reno	19	Classical Vocal, "Quando m'en vò" from La bohème			
New Hampshire	Michelle Godfrey	Portsmouth	18	Modern Interpretive Dance, "Tabu"			
New Jersey	Jeannette Phillipuk	Laurel Springs	20	Vocal Medley, "The Sweetest Sounds" & "Nobody Told Me" from No Strings			
New Mexico	Karen Jan Maciolek	Albuquerque	19	Waltz Ballet, "Wunderbar"		Miss Congeniality	
(New York (state)) New York	Patricia Burmeister	Portville	24	Classical Vocal, "L'Air des clochettes" from Lakmé	Top 10		
North Carolina	Elisa Annette Johnson	New Bern	19	Vocal, "As Long as He Needs Me" from Oliver!		Non-finalist Talent Award	
North Dakota	Virginia Hanson	Bismarck	21	Semi-classical Vocal, "This is My Country"			
Ohio	Leslyn Hiple	Louisville	19	Vocal Medley, "If My Friends Could See Me Now" & "I'm a Brass Band" from Sweet Charity			
Oklahoma	Beverly Drew	Harrah	22	Vocal, "Step to the Rear"			
Oregon	Marjean Kay Langley	Milton-Freewater	19	Classical Ballet, "The Dying Swan"	3rd runner-up		
Pennsylvania	Susan Robinson	Pittsburgh	22	Comedy Monologue, "Sis Hopkins"			
Rhode Island	Arlene Pinto	Warwick	21	Vocal/Dance, "Thoroughly Modern Millie"			
South Carolina	Rebecca Smith	Clover	19	Semi-classical Vocal, "America the Beautiful"			
South Dakota	Ann McKay	Vermillion	21	Dramatic Monologue from This Property is Condemned		Non-finalist Talent Award	
Tennessee	Brenda Seal	Kingsport	19	Popular Vocal, "What Now My Love"	Top 10		Contestant at National Sweetheart 1967
Texas	Diane Hugghins	Tyler	20	Jazz Dance, "Put on a Happy Face" from Bye Bye Birdie			
Utah	Kathleen Frances Wood	Salt Lake City	19	Monologue, "The Promise of One Person on This Planet"			
Vermont	Elizabeth Sackler	Putney	20	Modern Dance Interpretation to Self Recorded Reading of "The Last Flower"		Non-finalist Talent Award	
Virginia	Cherie Davis	Clifton Forge	20	Classical Vocal, "Mon cœur s'ouvre à ta voix"	Top 10	Preliminary Talent Award	
(Washington (state)) Washington	Joyce Stepanek	Issaquah	20	Comedy Routine, "The Adventures of Huck Finn"			
West Virginia	Charlotte Warwick	Charleston	22	Semi-classical Vocal, "The Impossible Dream"			
Wisconsin	Marilyn Brahmsteadt	Wisconsin Rapids	21	Vocal, "What a Difference a Day Made"			
Wyoming	Carol Ross	Burns	20	Clarinet Medley, "Clarinet Concerto" by Mozart, "Strangers on the Shore", & "Ji-da"		Non-finalist Talent Award	
