= Miss Illinois =

Beauty pageant competition

- Formation: 1922
- Type: Beauty pageant
- Headquarters: Marion
- Location: Illinois
- Members: Miss America
- Official language: English
- Key people: Dr. Susan Shea (Executive Director)
- Website: Official website

The Miss Illinois is a pageant program affiliated with Miss America, which is competition for women models representing the state of Illinois.

The first "Miss Illinois" sent to the national pageant was Lois Delander who subsequently won the Miss America title. Including Delander, five Miss Illinois representatives have won the Miss America title.

Violinist Kate Dimmett of Zionsville, IN was crowned Miss Illinois on June 13, 2026, at the Marion Cultural Arts and Civic Center in Marion, Illinois. She competed for the title of Miss America 2027 on September 6, 2026 in West Palm Beach, Florida and placed 2nd runner-up.

== Results summary ==
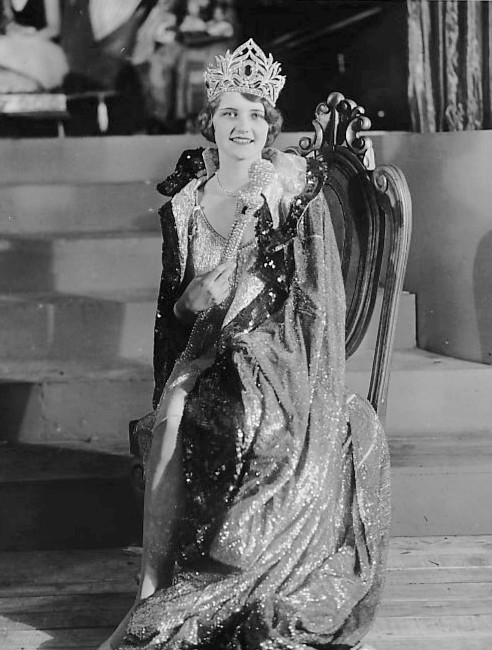
Lois Delander, Miss Illinois 1927 and Miss America 1927

The following is a visual summary of the past results of Miss Illinois titleholders at the national Miss America pageants/competitions. The year in parentheses indicates the year of the national competition during which a placement and/or award was garnered, not the year attached to the contestant's state title.

Awards received by contestants competing as Miss Chicago at the national pageant are denoted with a "*".

=== Placements ===
- Miss Americas: Lois Delander (1927), Judith Ford (1969), Marjorie Vincent (1991), Katherine Shindle (1998), Erika Harold (2003)
- 1st runners-up: Bette Brunk* (1942), Sandra Truitt (1982), Jade Smalls (2000)
- 2nd runners-up: Trudi Germi (1949), Florence Gallagher* (1956), Jean Ahern (1975), Kate Dimmett (2027)
- 3rd runners-up: Arlene Causey (1936), Elaine Steinbach* (1944), Jeri Zimmermann (1990)
- 4th runners-up: Margaret Leigh (1924), Jo Hoppe* (1953), Tracy Hayes (1996)
- Top 10: Patricia Hayes (1942), Marjorie Nelson* (1943), Adrianne Falcon* (1952), Regina Dombeck* (1955), Sandra Jean Stuart* (1957), Suzanne Ingeborg Johnson (1960), Colleen Metternich (1974), Hannah Smith (2011), Megan Jo Ervin (2012), Isabelle Hanson (2022)
- Top 11: Monica Nia Jones (2023), Nitsaniyah Fitch (2026)
- Top 12: Betty June King (1944)
- Top 13: Lee Mercer Wieland* (1945)
- Top 15: Ethel Lorraine Lodbell (1939), Lois Nettleton* (1948), Teresa Giorgian* (1949), Abby Foster (2018)
- Top 16: Patricia Frye (1946), Cloris Leachman* (1946), Marjorie Adams* (1951)

Illinois holds a record of 36 placements at Miss America.

=== Awards ===
==== Preliminary awards ====
- Preliminary Lifestyle and Fitness: Bette Brunk* (1942), Trudi Germi (1949), Jo Hoppe* (1953), Sandra Stuart* (1957), Pamela Gilbert (1963), Judith Ford (1969), Jeri Zimmermann (1990), Tracy Hayes (1996), Megan Jo Ervin (2013)
- Preliminary Talent: Suzanne Ingeborg Johnson (1960), Judith Ford (1969), Colleen Metternich (1974), Jean Ahern (1975), Sandra Truitt (1982), Marjorie Vincent (1991), Katherine Shindle (1998), Jenny Powers (2001), Isabelle Hanson (2021)
- Preliminary Interview: Erika Harold (2003)
- Preliminary On-Stage Interview: Erika Harold (2003)
- Preliminary Evening Gown: Nitsaniyah Fitch (2026)

==== Non-finalist awards ====
- Non-finalist Talent: Audra Deckmann* (1959), Margaret McDowell* (1961), Vicky Joyce Nutter (1961), Donnalyn Freund* (1963), Dulcie Scripture (1970), Debra Carlson (1979), Blythe Sawyer (1981), Cindi Hodgkins (1988), Cheryl Majercik (1992), Kathleen Farrell (1993), Sara Martin (1994), Chuti Tiu (1995), Amanda Jo Meadows (1999), Jenny Powers (2001)

==== Other awards ====
- Miss Congeniality: Patsy Bruce (1955)
- America's Choice: Abby Foster (2018), Monica Nia Jones (2023)
- Charles & Theresa Brown Scholarship: Marisa Buchheit (2015), Jessica Tilton (2023)
- Equity & Justice Scholarship Award Finalists: Ariel Beverly (2020)
- Overall Interview Award: Erika Harold (2003)
- Quality of Life Award Winners: Cheryl Majercik (1992)
- STEM Scholarship Award Winners: Jaryn Franklin (2017)
- AHA Go Red for Women Leadership Award Regional Winner: Nitsaniyah Fitch (2026)
- Quality of Life Award Finalist: Kate Dimmett (2027)

== Winners ==
- Declared as winner
- Ended as a runner-up
- Ended as a finalist or semi-finalist

Year	Name	Hometown	Age	Local Title	Miss America Talent	Placement at Miss America	Special scholarships at Miss America	Notes
2026	Kate Dimmett	Zionsville, IN	23	Miss Chicago	Violin	2nd runner-up	Quality of Life Award Finalist	Previously Miss Indiana's Outstanding Teen 2021
2025	Nitsaniyah Fitch	Chicago	26	Miss Windy City	Vocal	Top 11	Preliminary Evening Gown AHA Go Red for Women Leadership Award Regional Winner	
2024	Breana Bagley	Decatur	26	Miss Land of Lincoln	Lyrical Dance, "A New Day Has Come"			
2023	Jessica Tilton	Washington	25	Miss Quad Cities	Color Guard/Flag Performance, "The Call"		Charles & Theresa Brown Scholarship	First woman in history to compete a flag performance as a talent at Miss America.
2022	Monica Nia Jones	Chicago	26	Miss Windy City	Violin	Top 11	America's Choice	
2021	Isabelle Hanson	Glen Ellyn	25	Miss Northern Suburbs	Violin	Top 10	Preliminary Talent Award	Previously Miss Illinois' Outstanding Teen 2013
2019–20 (Note: Titleholder extended to a second full year in 2020 after state and national pageants postponed to 2021 due to the COVID-19 pandemic)	Ariel Beverly	Springfield	24	Miss East Central	Vocal		Equity & Justice Scholarship Award Finalist	
2018	Grace Khachaturian	Champaign	21	Miss Capital City	Lyrical Dance, "You Raise Me Up"			Previously Miss Illinois' Outstanding Teen 2012
2017	Abby Foster	Danville	21	Miss East Central	Jazz Dance, Grease medley	Top 15	America's Choice	Former NFL cheerleader for the Indianapolis Colts
2016	Jaryn Franklin	East Moline	23	Miss Blackhawk Valley	Vocal, "Dream a Little Dream of Me"		STEM Scholarship Award	
2015	Crystal Davis	Anna	22	Miss Southern Illinois	Vocal, "That's Life"			
2014	Marisa Buchheit	Chicago	24	Miss Chicago	Operatic Vocal, "Je veux vivre" from Roméo et Juliette		Charles & Theresa Brown Scholarship	
2013	Brittany Smith	Elmhurst	23	Miss Northern Suburbs	Irish Step Dancing, "Lord of the Dance"			
2012	Megan Jo Ervin	Rushville	23	Miss Quincy	Dance, "Faithfully"	Top 10	Preliminary Swimsuit Award	Contestant at National Sweetheart 2011 pageant
2011	Hannah Smith	Huntley	20	Miss Windy City	Ballet en Pointe, "Palladio"	Top 10		
2010	Whitney Thorpe-Klinsky	New Baden	22	Miss River to River	Tap Dance, "On the Dance Floor"			
2009	Erin O'Connor	Evergreen Park	20	Miss Macomb	Ballet en Pointe, "I Wanna Dance with Somebody Remix"			
2008	Katie Lorenz	Chicago	24	Miss Chicago	Lyrical Dance, "Footprints in the Sand"			
2007	Ashley Hatfield	Anna	24	Miss Heartland	Vocal, "To Love You More"			
2006	Heidi Ekstrom	Mundelein	24	Miss Kane County	Ballet en Pointe, "Ride"			
2005	Lauren Allen	Batavia	21	Miss Western Suburbs	Freestyle Gymnastics, "Rhythm of the Night"			
2004	Michelle LaGroue	Naperville	24	Miss Chicago	Vocal, "I Know the Truth" from Aida			Previously held the title of Miss Illinois in 2002 after Harold was named Miss America 2003
2003	Andrea Fritz	Schaumburg	21	Miss Chicago	Lyrical Dance, "Dance With My Father"			
2002	Michelle LaGroue	Naperville		Miss Tinley Park		Did not compete; later assumed the title after Harold won Miss America 2003		
2002	Erika Harold	Urbana	22	Miss Land of Lincoln	Classical Vocal, "Habanera"	Winner	Preliminary Interview Award Preliminary On-stage Interview Award Overall Interview Award	
2001	Kristin Castillo	Macomb	18	Miss Macomb	Classical Violin, "Praeludium & Allegro"			
2000	Jenny Powers	Andover, Massachusetts	21	Miss Northern Illinois	Classical Vocal, "Quando me'n vo'"		Preliminary Talent Award Non-finalist Talent Award	Was eligible to compete for Miss Illinois as a student at Northwestern University
1999	Jade Smalls	Evanston	21	Miss Chicago	Classical Piano, "Etude in C Minor"	1st runner-up		
1998	Amanda Jo Meadows	Sycamore	20	Miss Macomb	Baton, "María"		Non-finalist Talent Award	
1997	Ashley Eisenhauer	Herrin		Miss John A. Logan		Did not compete; later assumed the title after Shindle won Miss America 1998		
1997	Katherine Shindle	Evanston	20	Miss Lake-Cook	Vocal, "Don't Rain on My Parade"	Winner	Preliminary Talent Award	
1996	Tania Gibson	Lake Barrington	19	Miss Fox River Valley	Vocal, "As If We Never Said Goodbye" from Sunset Boulevard			
1995	Tracy Hayes	Wheaton	22	Miss Greater DuPage County	Vocal, "Tonight"	4th runner-up	Preliminary Swimsuit Award	
1994	Chuti Tiu	Chicago	24	Miss Kankakee	Classical Piano		Non-finalist Talent Award	Previously America's Junior Miss 1987
1993	Sara Martin	Schaumburg	20	Miss Schaumburg	Vocal, "Hello, Young Lovers"		Non-finalist Talent Award	Previously America's Junior Miss 1990
1992	Kathleen Farrell	Chicago	23	Miss Kankakee	Classical Piano, "Danza No. 5"		Non-finalist Talent Award	Sister of Miss New York 1984, Mary-Ann Farrell and Miss Florida 1985, Monica Farrell Later Miss Illinois USA 1994 Top 10 at Miss USA 1994 Mother of Miss Ohio 2022, Elizabetta Nies
1991	Cheryl Majercik	Niles	26	Miss Chicago	Classical Vocal, "O Mio Babbino Caro"		Non-finalist Talent Award Quality of Life Award	
1990	Jaclyn Greer	Granite City		Miss Madison County		Did not compete; later assumed the title after Vincent won Miss America 1991		
1990	Marjorie Vincent	Oak Park	25	Miss Kankakee	Classical Piano, Fantaisie-Impromptu	Winner	Preliminary Talent Award	
1989	Jeri Lynn Zimmermann	Evanston	21	Miss Northwestern University	Vocal, "On My Own"	3rd runner-up	Preliminary Swimsuit Award	Best known for playing the Borg Seven of Nine on Star Trek: Voyager
1988	Dawn Spicuzza	Collinsville	22	Miss Mississippi Valley	Vocal, "If I Loved You"			
1987	Cindi Hodgkins	Schaumburg	22	Miss Chicago	Vocal Medley, "My Man" & "But the World Goes Round"		Non-finalist Talent Award	
1986	Lisa Heussner	Pekin	21	Miss Pekin	Dramatic Interpretation, "Emily Dickinson, Portrait of a Poet"			
1985	Karen Moncrieff	Chicago	21	Miss Northwestern University	Popular Vocal, "Through the Eyes of Love" from Ice Castles			
1984	Ruth Booker	Chicago	21	Miss Chicago	Vocal, "Kiss Me In the Rain"			
1983	Rebecca Bush	Chicago	24	Miss Chicago	Vocal, "It's My Turn"			Played Detective Katie Grant on Jake and the Fatman
1982	Jaleigh Jeffers	Mt. Carmel	21	Miss Southern Illinois	Piano, '"Bumble Boogie"			
1981	Sandra Truitt	Evanston	25	Miss North Shore	Classical Vocal, "Près des remparts de Séville" from Carmen	1st runner-up	Preliminary Talent Award	Dr. Sandra Truitt Field died at age 69 on August 7, 2025 in Aiken, South Carolina.
1980	Blythe Sawyer	Naperville	22	Miss Chicago	Classical Vocal, "The Jewel Song" from Faust		Non-finalist Talent Award	
1979	Elizabeth Russell	Pekin	20	Miss Heart of Illinois	Classical Vocal, "O Luce di Quest'Anima" from Linda di Chamounix			Assumed title after original winner, Shanna McNeill, was stripped of the title
1978	Debra Carlson	Ottawa	19	Miss Ottawa	Flute, "Carnival of Venice"		Non-finalist Talent Award	
1977	Nancy Beatty	Avon	22	Miss Macomb	Classical Vocal, "Voices of Spring"			
1976	Betsy Jamison	Mundelein	24	Miss Lake County	Popular Vocal, "Who Will Buy?" from Oliver!			
1975	Jean Waters	Tuscola	22	Miss Crossroads Country	Gymnastic Dance / Trampoline, "High School Cadets"			
1974	Jean Ahern	Hinsdale	21	Miss Hinsdale-Clarendon Hills	Ballet en Pointe, "Kitri's Variation" from Don Quixote	2nd runner-up	Preliminary Talent Award	
1973	Colleen Metternich	Carthage	23	Miss Heart of Illinois	Piano, "Variations on a Twelve Note Theme"	Top 10	Preliminary Talent Award	
1972	Carolyn Paulus	Elmhurst	20	Miss Macomb	Classical Vocal, "Glitter And Be Gay" from Candide			
1971	Anita Pankratz	Chicago	21	Miss Chicago	Vocal / Piano, "Someone to Watch Over Me"			
1970	Lynn Alexander	Loami	18	Miss Springfield	Classical Vocal, "Vissi d'arte"			
1969	Dulcie Scripture	Elgin	20	Miss Elgin	Piano, "Khachaturian's Toccata"		Non-finalist Talent Award	
1968	Sharon Mitchell	Westchester	19	Miss Bellwood-Westchester		Did not compete; later assumed the title after Ford won Miss America 1969		
1968	Judith Ford	Belvidere	18	Miss Boone County	Acrobatic Dance & Trampoline, "The Blue Danube"	Winner	Preliminary Swimsuit Award Preliminary Talent Award	
1967	Kathryn Myers	Aurora	20	Miss Fox Valley	Dramatic Reading from Ion			
1966	Mary Lee Inzerello	Elk Grove	19	Miss Adams County	Modern Dance			
1965	Kathleen Oros	Granite City	20	Miss Granite City	Popular Vocal, "Just You Wait" from My Fair Lady			
1964	Patricia Louis Quillen	North Aurora	21	Miss Fox Valley	Clarinet			Finalist at National Press Photographers' Pageant 1962, Patricia Louis Quillen Brannen died at age 83 on April 26, 2026 in Geneva, Illinois.
1963	Judith Schlieper	Decatur	20	Miss Decatur	Siamese Dance			
1962	Donnalyn Freund	Winnetka	20	Miss Chicago	Vocal, "I Enjoy Being a Girl"		Non-finalist Talent Award	Multiple Illinois representatives Contestants competed under local title at Miss America pageant
1962	Pamela Gilbert	Carbondale	21	Miss Illinois	Dramatic Reading		Preliminary Swimsuit Award	Multiple Illinois representatives Contestants competed under local title at Miss America pageant
1961	Nancy Lee Kesler	Oak Park	18	Miss Chicago	Modern Dance			Multiple Illinois representatives Contestants competed under local title at Miss America pageant
1961	Jacqueline Kaye Bingert	Winthrop Harbor	21	Miss Illinois	Tap Dance & India Ink Sketching			Multiple Illinois representatives Contestants competed under local title at Miss America pageant
1960	Margaret McDowell	Evanston	21	Miss Chicago	Dramatic Reading		Non-finalist Talent Award	Multiple Illinois representatives Contestants competed under local title at Miss America pageant
1960	Vicky Joyce Nutter	Vandalia	18	Miss Illinois	Presentation of Fashion Designs		Non-finalist Talent Award	Multiple Illinois representatives Contestants competed under local title at Miss America pageant
1959	Carol Rubin	Chicago	18	Miss Chicago	Modern Jazz Dance			Multiple Illinois representatives Contestants competed under local title at Miss America pageant
1959	Suzanne Ingeborg Johnson	Chicago	21	Miss Illinois	Vocal, "Hello, Young Lovers"	Top 10	Preliminary Talent Award	Multiple Illinois representatives Contestants competed under local title at Miss America pageant
1958	Audra Deckmann	Chicago		Miss Chicago	Dance		Non-finalist Talent Award	Multiple Illinois representatives Contestants competed under local title at Miss America pageant
1958	Anita Ruth Olson	River Forest		Miss Illinois	Piano, "Rhapsody in G Minor" by Johannes Brahms			Multiple Illinois representatives Contestants competed under local title at Miss America pageant
1957	Bette Lieb	Chicago		Miss Chicago	Dramatic Monologue from Romeo and Juliet			Multiple Illinois representatives Contestants competed under local title at Miss America pageant
1957	Jeannie Beacham	Downers Grove		Miss Illinois	Drama, "The Great Debates"			Multiple Illinois representatives Contestants competed under local title at Miss America pageant
1956	Sandra Jean Stuart	Chicago		Miss Chicago	Water Ballet Video Presentation	Top 10	Preliminary Swimsuit Award	Multiple Illinois representatives Contestants competed under local title at Miss America pageant
1956	Tillie Micheletto	Collinsville		Miss Illinois	Vocal			Multiple Illinois representatives Contestants competed under local title at Miss America pageant
1955	Florence Gallagher	Chicago		Miss Chicago	Semi-classical Vocal, "Love Is Where You Find It"	2nd runner-up		Multiple Illinois representatives Contestants competed under local title at Miss America pageant
1955	Marian Elizabeth Cox	Oak Park		Miss Illinois	Vocal, "If I Loved You"			Multiple Illinois representatives Contestants competed under local title at Miss America pageant
1954	Regina Janine Dombeck	Chicago		Miss Chicago	Dramatic Monologue from Mary of Scotland by Maxwell Anderson	Top 10		Johnson was disqualified as Miss Chicago when it was discovered that she was a native of Detroit and had not resided long enough in the represented city Multiple Illinois representatives Contestants competed under local title at Miss America pageant
1954	Jean M. Johnson	Chicago	19	Miss Chicago	Vocal	N/A		Johnson was disqualified as Miss Chicago when it was discovered that she was a native of Detroit and had not resided long enough in the represented city Multiple Illinois representatives Contestants competed under local title at Miss America pageant
1954	Patsy "Pat" Bruce	Fairfield	18	Miss Illinois	Dramatic Reading		Miss Congeniality	Johnson was disqualified as Miss Chicago when it was discovered that she was a native of Detroit and had not resided long enough in the represented city Multiple Illinois representatives Contestants competed under local title at Miss America pageant
1953	Carol Segermark	Chicago		Miss Chicago	Vocal			Multiple Illinois representatives Contestants competed under local title at Miss America pageant
1953	Jacquie Dumbauld	Alton		Miss Illinois	Piano / Dance			Multiple Illinois representatives Contestants competed under local title at Miss America pageant
1952	Jo Hoppe	Chicago		Miss Chicago	Tap Dance	4th runner-up	Preliminary Swimsuit Award	Multiple Illinois representatives Contestants competed under local title at Miss America pageant
1952	Glenna Marie Pohly	Rock Falls		Miss Illinois	Flute			Multiple Illinois representatives Contestants competed under local title at Miss America pageant
1951	Adrianne Falcon	Chicago		Miss Chicago	Vocal & Dance	Top 10		Multiple Illinois representatives Contestants competed under local title at Miss America pageant
1951	Doris King	Granite City		Miss Illinois	Dance			Multiple Illinois representatives Contestants competed under local title at Miss America pageant
1950	Marjorie Adams	Chicago		Miss Chicago	Monologue, "To the Lovely Margaret"	Top 16		Multiple Illinois representatives Contestants competed under local title at Miss America pageant
1950	Catherine Kleinschmidt	Granite City		Miss Illinois	Vocal, "Come to the Fair"			Multiple Illinois representatives Contestants competed under local title at Miss America pageant
1949	Teresa Giorgian	Chicago		Miss Chicago	Vocal, "Jealousy"	Top 15		Multiple Illinois representatives Contestants competed under local title at Miss America pageant
1949	Trudi Germi	Chicago		Miss Illinois	Classical Vocal, "Mon cœur s'ouvre à ta voix"	2nd runner-up	Preliminary Swimsuit Award	Multiple Illinois representatives Contestants competed under local title at Miss America pageant
1948	Lois Nettleton	Chicago		Miss Chicago	Dramatic Monologue from Saint Joan	Top 15		Multiple Illinois representatives Contestants competed under local title at Miss America pageant
1948	Viola Ruth Hutmacher	Quincy		Miss Illinois	Classical Vocal, "Italian Street Song"			Multiple Illinois representatives Contestants competed under local title at Miss America pageant
1947	Joan Hiatt	Chicago		Miss Chicago	Vocal, "Kiss In the Dark"			Multiple Illinois representatives Contestants competed under local title at Miss America pageant
1947	Maree Evans	Joliet			Dress Design & Art			Multiple Illinois representatives Contestants competed under local title at Miss America pageant
1946	Cloris Leachman	Chicago		Miss Chicago	Comic Sketch, "One Man Radio Program"	Top 16	Actress Cloris Wallace Leachman died at age 94 on January 27, 2021 in Encinitas, California. The cause of death was a stroke with COVID-19 as a contributing factor.	Multiple Illinois representatives Contestants competed under local title at Miss America pageant
1946	Patricia Frye	Pekin		Miss Illinois	Vocal / Tap Dance, "I Don't Know Why I Love You Like I Do"	Top 16		Multiple Illinois representatives Contestants competed under local title at Miss America pageant
1945	Lee Mercer Wieland	Chicago		Miss Chicago	Monologue, "A Lesson With a Fan"	Top 13		Multiple Illinois representatives Contestants competed under local title at Miss America pageant
1945	Beverly Ann Long	Joliet					Beverly Ann Long Feehan died at age 91 on November 21, 2018 in Illinois.	Multiple Illinois representatives Contestants competed under local title at Miss America pageant
1944	Elaine Steinbach	Chicago		Miss Chicago	Vocal, "You'll Never Know"	3rd runner-up		Multiple Illinois representatives Contestants competed under local title at Miss America pageant
1944	Betty June King	Bloomington		Miss Illinois	Acrobatic Dance, "Stardust"	Top 12		Multiple Illinois representatives Contestants competed under local title at Miss America pageant
1943	Marjorie Nelson	Chicago		Miss Chicago	Rhythmic Ballet	Top 10		Multiple Illinois representatives Contestants competed under local title at Miss America pageant
1943	Dorothy Belle Kohrt	Ottawa, Illinois		Miss Illinois				Multiple Illinois representatives Contestants competed under local title at Miss America pageant
1942	Bette Brunk	Chicago		Miss Chicago	Hula, "Hawaiian War Chant"	1st runner-up	Preliminary Swimsuit Award	Multiple Illinois representatives Contestants competed under local title at Miss America pageant
1942	Patricia Hayes	Rochelle		Miss Illinois	Dramatic Recitation	Top 10		Multiple Illinois representatives Contestants competed under local title at Miss America pageant
1941	No Illinois representative at Miss America pageant							
1940	No Illinois representative at Miss America pageant							
1939	Ethel Lorraine Lodbell	Chicago		Miss Chicago	Monologue, "From the Diary of a Contestant"	Top 15		No Miss Illinois Competed under local title at Miss America pageant
1938	No Illinois representative at Miss America pageant							
1937	No Illinois representative at Miss America pageant							
1936	Genevieve Anderson	Chicago		Miss Chicago				Multiple Illinois representatives Contestants competed under local title at Miss America pageant
1936	Arlene Causey	Chicago		Miss Cook County		3rd runner-up	Best Model	Multiple Illinois representatives Contestants competed under local title at Miss America pageant
1936	Virginia Moeller	Springfield						Multiple Illinois representatives Contestants competed under local title at Miss America pageant
1935	No Illinois representative at Miss America pageant							
1934	No national pageant was held							
1933	Lillian Mary Kroener		18			N/A		Disqualified because she resided in St. Louis, Missouri
1932	No national pageants were held							
1931	No national pageants were held							
1930	No national pageants were held							
1929	No national pageants were held							
1928	No national pageants were held							
1927	Myrtle Valsted	Chicago		Miss Chicago	N/A			Multiple Illinois representatives Contestants competed under local title at national pageant
1927	Gladys Vile	Danville		Miss Danville	N/A			Multiple Illinois representatives Contestants competed under local title at national pageant
1927	Lois Delander	Joliet	16	Miss Illinois	N/A	Winner		Multiple Illinois representatives Contestants competed under local title at national pageant
1927	Anna G. Bernard	Springfield		Miss Springfield	N/A			Multiple Illinois representatives Contestants competed under local title at national pageant
1926	Mae Greene	Chicago		Miss Chicago	N/A			Competed under local title at national pageant
1925	Margarita Gonzales	Chicago		Miss Chicago	N/A			Multiple Illinois representatives Contestants competed under local title at national pageant
1925	Lucille Burns	Elgin		Miss Elgin	N/A			Multiple Illinois representatives Contestants competed under local title at national pageant
1924	Margaret Leigh	Chicago		Miss Chicago	N/A	4th runner-up		Multiple Illinois representatives Contestants competed under local title at national pageant
1924	Virginia Lipscomb	Decatur		Miss Decatur	N/A			Multiple Illinois representatives Contestants competed under local title at national pageant
1923	Corrine Dellefield	Chicago		Miss Chicago	N/A			Competed under local title at national pageant
1922	Georgia Hale	Chicago	22	Miss Chicago	N/A			Competed under local title at national pageant Later starred in Charlie Chaplin's 1925 film, The Gold Rush, and the 1926 silent film, The Great Gatsby
1921	No Illinois representative at Miss America pageant							
