= Thomas Gilcrease =

American businessman

- Born: William Thomas Gilcrease; February 8, 1890; Robeline, Natchitoches Parish, Louisiana
- Died: May 6, 1962 (aged 72); Tulsa, Oklahoma
- Citizenship: Muscogee (Creek) Nation and U.S.
- Occupation: Oilman
- Years active: 1922–1962
- Known for: Founder of Gilcrease Museum
- Spouses: Belle M. Harlow (m. 1908; div. 1924) Norma Smallwood (m. 1928; div. 1934)
- Children: 3

William Thomas Gilcrease (February 8, 1890 – May 6, 1962) was an Muscogee-American oilman, art collector, and philanthropist. During his lifetime, Gilcrease collected more than 10,000 artworks, 250,000 Native American artifacts and 100,000 rare books and documents, including the only surviving certified copy of the Declaration of Independence. He was the founder of Gilcrease Museum in Tulsa, Oklahoma. In 1971, he was inducted into the Hall of Great Westerners of the National Cowboy & Western Heritage Museum.

== Biography ==
=== Early life ===
Gilcrease was born in Robeline, Natchitoches Parish, Louisiana, on February 8, 1890. He was the son of William Lee Gilcrease and Mary "Elizabeth" [nee Vowell] Gilcrease, a Muscogee Creek. Mary "Elizabeth" was an enrolled member of the Muscogee Nation, and shortly after his birth, the family moved to Indian Territory to take advantage of the 160-acre (0.65 km^{2}) allotments in the Creek Nation. The family lived on tribal lands near Eufaula, Oklahoma. After the move, Gilcrease's father ran a cotton gin in the nearby community of Mounds, Oklahoma.

Gilcrease's early education was limited, and took place in one-room schools in Indian Territory. As a boy, he was often called "Indian Tom". Gilcrease attended Bacone College, where his most influential teacher was Alexander Posey, (Note: Alexander Posey (1873–1908), an author and humorist; among other achievements, he was elected secretary of the 1906 Sequoyah Constitutional Convention, a prelude to the creation of the State of Oklahoma, and wrote most of the Sequoyah Constitution that was produced by the convention.) who taught his students the arts, sciences, writing, and about their American Indian heritage. The latter included learning of the Trail of Tears and important American Indian leaders, such as Sequoyah and Sitting Bull. Also, instruction on how to make bows and arrows and to hunt, and about the operations of the Creek National Council at Okmulgee. After Bacone College, Gilcrease enrolled in the Kansas State Teacher's College (renamed in 1974 to Emporia State University) at Emporia, Kansas.

At the turn of the 20th century, the federal government dissolved the Indian Nations land by distributing parcels into private ownership. At age nine, Gilcrease's 1/8 Creek heritage entitled him to receive 160 acres (650,000 m^{2}), located about twenty miles (32 km) southwest of Tulsa, Oklahoma. In 1905, drillers struck oil in the area. His land, sitting astride the huge Glenn Pool Oil Reserve, made Gilcrease a multi-millionaire by the time he was twenty. (Note: He had 32 producing wells on his allotment by 1917.) Though he struggled early in his career, he proved to be an astute businessman. He founded the Gilcrease Oil Company in 1922, and with early successes, was able to purchase more land. Gilcrease established his company headquarters in San Antonio, Texas, in 1937 and also maintained an office in Europe. In 1949, the headquarters of the company moved to Tulsa.

=== Family ===
On August 22, 1908, Gilcrease married Belle M. Harlow, a member of the Osage Nation. He fathered two sons with Belle: William Thomas Gilcrease Jr., who was born on July 23, 1909, in Oklahoma and died on March 16, 1967, in Nacogdoches, Nacogdoches County, Texas, and Barton Eugene Gilcrease, who was born on April 12, 1911, in Tulsa, Oklahoma, and died on September 25, 1991, in San Antonio, Bexar County, Texas. The couple's marriage ended in divorce in 1924. On September 3, 1928, he married 19-year-old Norma Des Cygnet Smallwood, the former Miss Tulsa and Miss America 1926.

Thomas Gilcrease Sr. and Norma (Smallwood) Gilcrease were the parents of one daughter, Des Cygne Lamour Gilcrease. She was born on June 12, 1929, in Tulsa, Oklahoma. Thomas Gilcrease Sr. filed for divorce in October, 1933, for extreme cruelty and gross neglect of duty. He alleged that the couple had been happily married for two years, until Norma's mother, Mahala Dickerson had moved into the house with them and alienated the affections of both Norma and the couple's daughter. He wanted the mother-in-law removed from the property. The Gilcrease-Smallwood marriage ended in divorce on May 2, 1934. Initially, the divorce provided for $72,000 alimony, payable at the rate of $200 per month, but with a provision that all payments would cease if Norma were to remarry. Norma balked at the provision against remarriage, so the court set alimony at $15,000, to be paid at $250 per month. (Note: Thomas never remarried. Norma married George H. Bruce, a Wichita oilman, in 1936 and continued to live in Wichita until she died of undisclosed illness on May 8, 1966. Their only child, Des Cygne, eventually married a San Antonio oilman, Corwin D. Denney. She also became a member of the board of the Gilcrease Museum, until she died in an automobile accident in 1968.)

During the 1920s and 1930s Gilcrease became inspired by the collections of European art museums. He began to collect oil paintings and other artifacts of the American West in 1922. The Gilcrease collection expanded over the next 20 years, with the majority obtained after 1939. In 1922, Gilcrease developed the La Linda sub-division in Long Beach, California.

In 1946, Gilcrease was honored by the Sioux Nation, made an honorary tribal member and given the name Wicarpi Wakatuya, which means "High Star".

Declining oil prices in the 1950s created financial difficulties for Gilcrease. Although his oil income was not insubstantial, major collection purchases limited his cash flow and placed him in a position of being unable to meet his current debt. Concerned about the integrity of his collection, Gilcrease offered it for sale as a unit in 1954. Swift action by the people of Tulsa enabled the debt to be covered by a local bond issue, and the collection remained in Oklahoma.

Thomas Gilcrease died of a heart attack on May 6, 1962. After a funeral service based on traditional Indian rites, he was buried in a mausoleum on the grounds of his estate, where his mother was buried after her death on June 11, 1935.

== Art collection ==
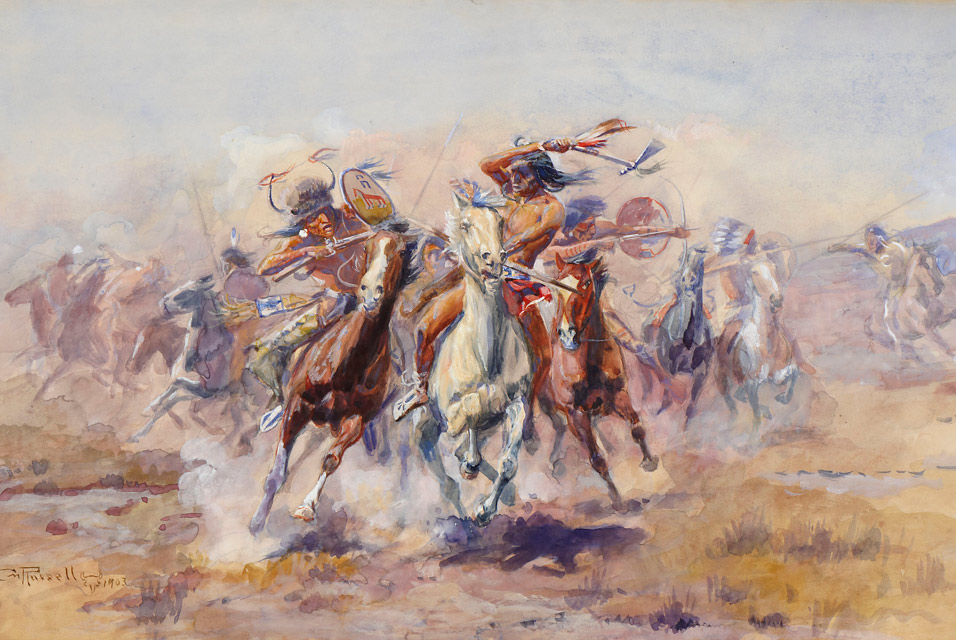
Charles M. Russell, "When Sioux and Blackfeet Meet", 1903. Watercolor and opaque watercolor on paper. Gilcrease Museum collection

The Gilcrease collection of American art, Native American art, artifacts, and documents was acquired over a lifetime. Gilcrease began to collect oil paintings and artifacts of the American West in 1922. At a time when few were interested in Native American or Western painting and sculptor, Gilcrease supported a number of Oklahoma artists, including Woody Crumbo (Potawatomi) and Acee Blue Eagle (Muscogee Creek) and Willard Stone, each of whom created works held in the collection.

In 1943, Gilcrease moved to San Antonio and opened the Museum of the American Indian, also known as the Gilcrease Museum. However, the San Antonio site failed to attract a large number of visitors. In 1947, he purchased the entire collection of the late Phillip Gillette Cole, an avid New York collector. The collection contained 21 bronzes and 46 paintings by Charles Marion Russell, 17 bronzes and 12 paintings by Frederic Remington, photographs by Edward Curtis, and documents and correspondence of well-known figures in the American West.

Gilcrease hired architect Alexandre Hogue to design a museum to be placed on Oklahoma property he had purchased in 1914. In 1949, he opened the Thomas Gilcrease Institute of American History and Art on this estate. During the remainder of his life, Gilcrease lived in an adjacent home, built of local sandstone. The rock home, dating from approximately 1912, had been extensively remodeled over the years and was surrounded by a garden specializing in plants used by local tribes.

In 1954, fearing that Gilcrease Museum would be sold and leave Tulsa, a small group of citizens organized a bond election. Tulsa's citizens approved, by a 3-to-1 margin, the $2.25 million bond issue which paid Gilcrease's outstanding debts. In response, Gilcrease deeded his entire collection to the City of Tulsa in 1955, and conveyed the museum buildings and grounds to the city in 1958. In addition, Gilcrease committed oil property revenue to Tulsa for museum maintenance until the bond was fully repaid.

After the transfer of the collection, Gilcrease continued to fund archaeological excavations and acquire additional materials. These materials were bequeathed to the museum upon his death in Tulsa on May 6, 1962. Gilcrease's funeral was conducted in a manner that honored his Native heritage, with Chief Wolf Robe Hunt of the Acoma Pueblo in New Mexico leading the prayer. Arrows then were shot into the air to protect Gilcrease's spirit from evil during its travel to Sha-Pa-Po, the world beyond. Cornmeal was sprinkled at the site to provide food for the spirit's journey. Gilcrease's body was buried in a mausoleum on the grounds of his home and museum.

== The Gilcrease Museum ==
The Gilcrease Museum, also known as the Thomas Gilcrease Institute of American History and Art, holds what is considered among the world's largest and most comprehensive collections of fine art, artifacts, and archives dealing with the American West. Located in Tulsa, Oklahoma, the Institute grounds display 23 acres (93,000 m^{2}) of thematic gardens showcasing the gardening styles of different time periods in the American West. The grounds also include Thomas Gilcrease's home in Tulsa, as well as his mausoleum.

Tulsa voters approved $65 million to renovate and expand the museum as part of the 2016 Vision Tulsa sales tax package; however, the project morphed into an $83.6 million plan to build an entirely new museum after it was determined that rebuilding the existing museum to modern standards would be too expensive. Demolition of the old building and the start of the new began in 2022, with completion projected by Spring 2027. The Thomas Gilcrease house and the mausoleum will remain.
