= Fletcher Ransom =

American artist (1870–1943)

- Born: October 23, 1870; Alamo, Michigan, US
- Died: May 2, 1943; Plainwell, Michigan, US
- Notable work: Yer Out

Fletcher Charles Ransom (October 23, 1870 – May 2, 1943) was an American artist who worked as an illustrator of books, magazines, and calendars. Born in Alamo, Michigan, Ransom studied art in Chicago and New York and went on to establish a studio in New York City; there, he provided illustrations for various magazines and authors. He later moved to Joliet, Illinois, where he worked for the Gerlach Barklow Company as a calendar illustrator; he also was commissioned to produce calendar paintings of Abraham Lincoln. In 2016, a painting of his titled Yer Out sold for $48,000 at auction.

== Biography ==
Ransom was born on October 23, 1870, in Alamo, Michigan. His great uncle, Epaphroditus Ransom, was the seventh Governor of Michigan. Early in his life, his family noticed and encouraged his drawing ability. He studied under John Vanderpoel and Frederick Warren Freer at the School of the Art Institute of Chicago in 1892 and 1893 before attending New York's Academy of Fine Arts. Ransom opened a studio in New York and gained recognition as an illustrator of magazines, such as Ladies' Home Journal, Scribner's Magazine, and The Saturday Evening Post. He also provided illustrations for numerous books and novels, working with authors such as Marguerite Cunliffe-Owen and David Graham Phillips. In 1898, as a "special artist" for Collier's, he was assigned to paint American troops deploying to Cuba for the Spanish–American War. Ransom also wrote and illustrated a book satirizing Theodore Roosevelt entitled My Policies in Jungleland, published in 1910.

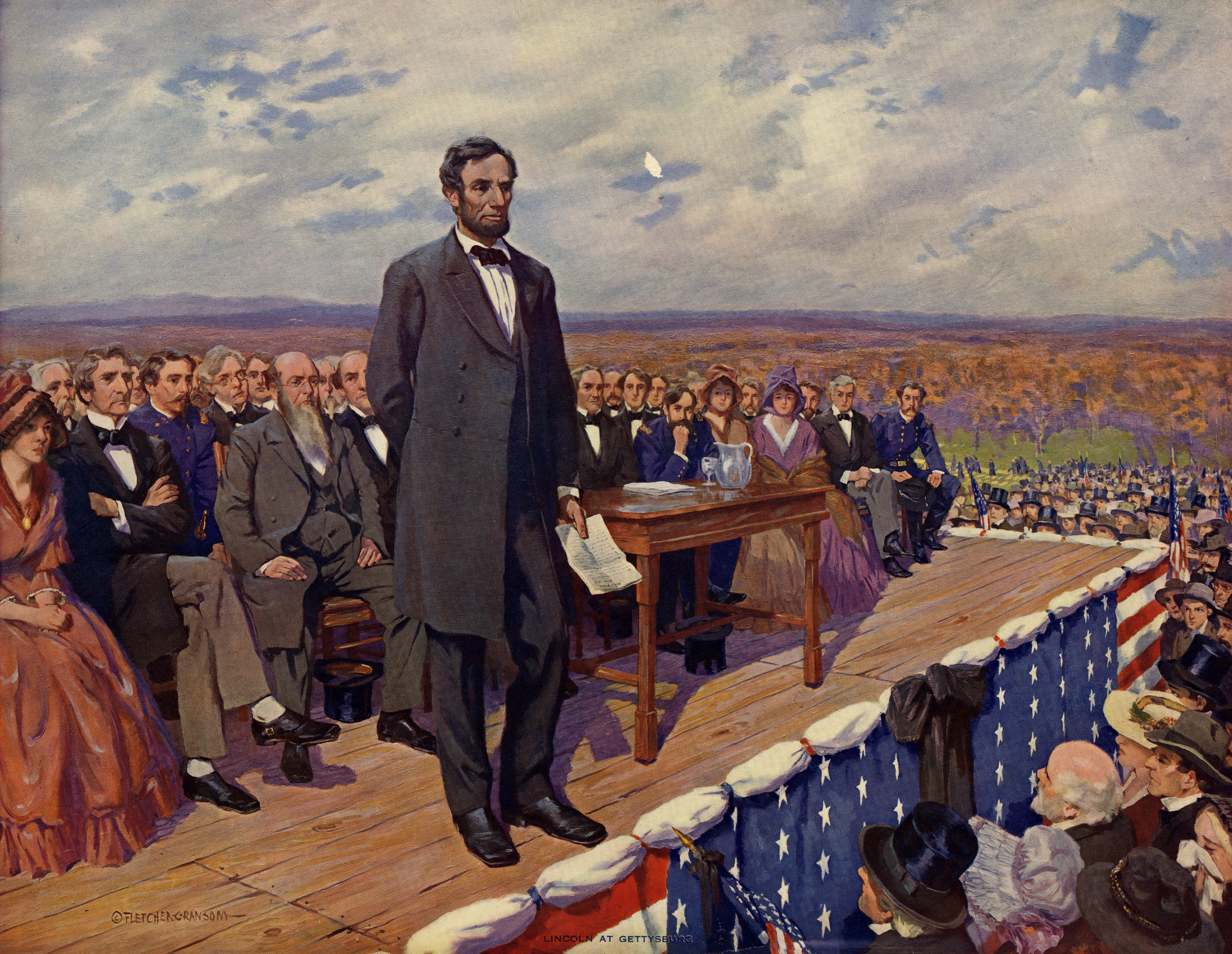
Lincoln at Gettysburg (1938)

Ransom married Jessamin McDonald, an opera singer, in 1899; the pair had a daughter and moved to Joliet, Illinois, before divorcing. In Joliet, Ransom worked for the Gerlach Barklow Company as a calendar illustrator. In 1930, Fred L. Schrader commissioned Ransom to produce a series of calendar paintings of Abraham Lincoln at various points in his life; in total, he completed fourteen such works. In 1935, after having fallen ill, Ransom moved to Plainwell, Michigan, with his sister and brother-in-law. He continued to paint in the barn behind their house until his death on May 2, 1943. He was buried in Alamo.

=== Yer Out ===
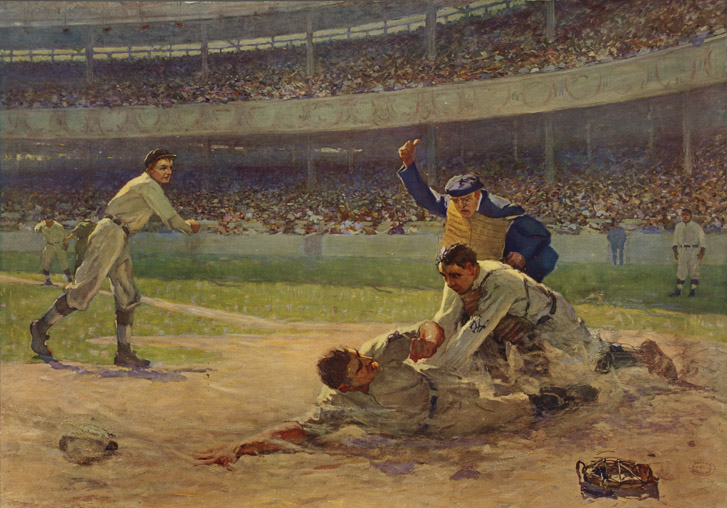
Yer Out (1915)

In 1915, while working for the Gerlach Barklow Company, Ransom painted Yer Out, a large oil painting depicting Honus Wagner being tagged out by Chief Meyers while Christy Mathewson looks on. Ransom presented the painting to one of the owners of Gerlach Barklow, who then gifted it to the Elks Lodge chapter in Joliet. The chapter then auctioned the painting in 2016. Yer Out sold for $48,000, making it one of his most expensive pieces by a wide margin.
