= Buchheit =

Buchheit is a surname. Notable people with the surname include:

- George Buchheit (1898–1972), American basketball coach
- Gérard Buchheit (born 1948), French middle-distance runner
- Marisa Buchheit (born 1990), American singer and beauty pageant winner
- Markus Buchheit (born 1983), German member of the European parliament
- Michael Buchheit (born 1967), German rower
- Paul Buchheit, American computer programmer and software developer
