= NCPHS =

NCPHS may refer to:

- National Commission for the Protection of Human Subjects of Biomedical and Behavioral Research, established on July 12, 1974 (see Tuskegee Syphilis Study)
- Northside College Preparatory High School
