= Judith Ford =

American beauty pageant titleholder and teacher

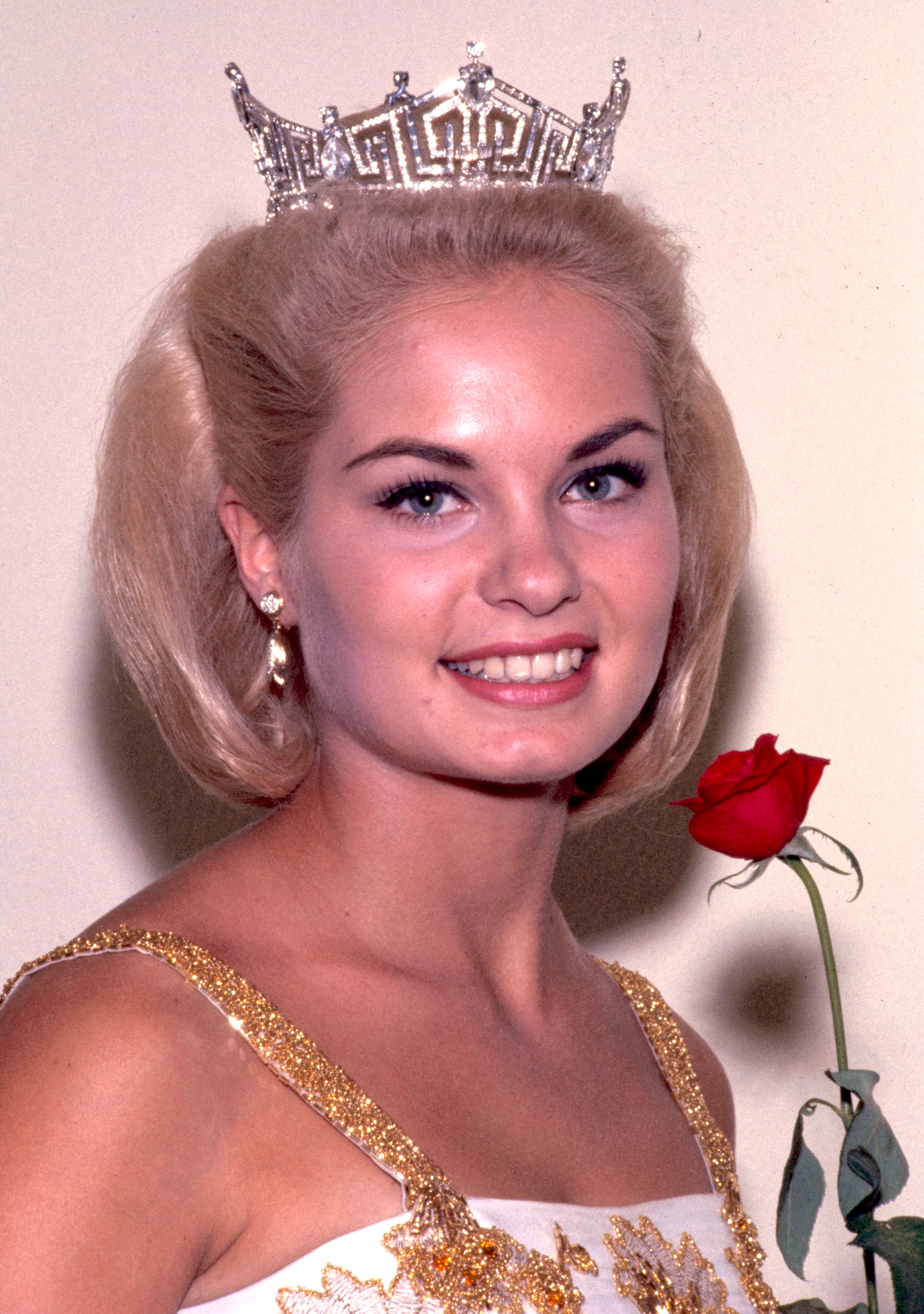
- Ford as Miss America 1969
- Born: Judith Anne Ford; December 26, 1949 (age 76); Iowa County, Iowa, U.S.
- Education: University of Illinois at Urbana-Champaign; Western Illinois University
- Occupations: Athletic teacher and coach
- Known for: Miss Boone County 1968; Miss Illinois 1968; Miss America 1969
- Predecessor: Debra Dene Barnes
- Successor: Pamela Eldred
- Spouses: Edwin Johnson; James Nash (m. 1990)
- Children: 2

Judith Anne Ford Nash (née Ford; born December 26, 1949) is a retired teacher who was Miss America 1969. Judith Anne Ford moved to Belvidere, Illinois, at age three with her parents and brother. In 1968 she won the title of Miss Boone County, held at the Boone County Fairgrounds. She also worked as a lifeguard at the city's public pool and was a swimming instructor during this time.

== Pageantry ==
Ford qualified to compete in the Miss America pageant by winning first the title of Miss Boone County and then the Miss Illinois 1968 pageant. Ford was a world-class trampolinist at the time of the pageant, and used her skills on the trampoline for her performance in the talent portion of the competition—the only Miss America contestant ever to compete using the trampoline.

Ford attended Belvidere High School, in Belvidere, Illinois. After graduating from high school, she spent her freshman year of college at the University of Louisiana at Lafayette, (then called the University of Southwestern Louisiana), to train under the expertise of trampoline coach Jeff Hennessy.

== Education and career ==
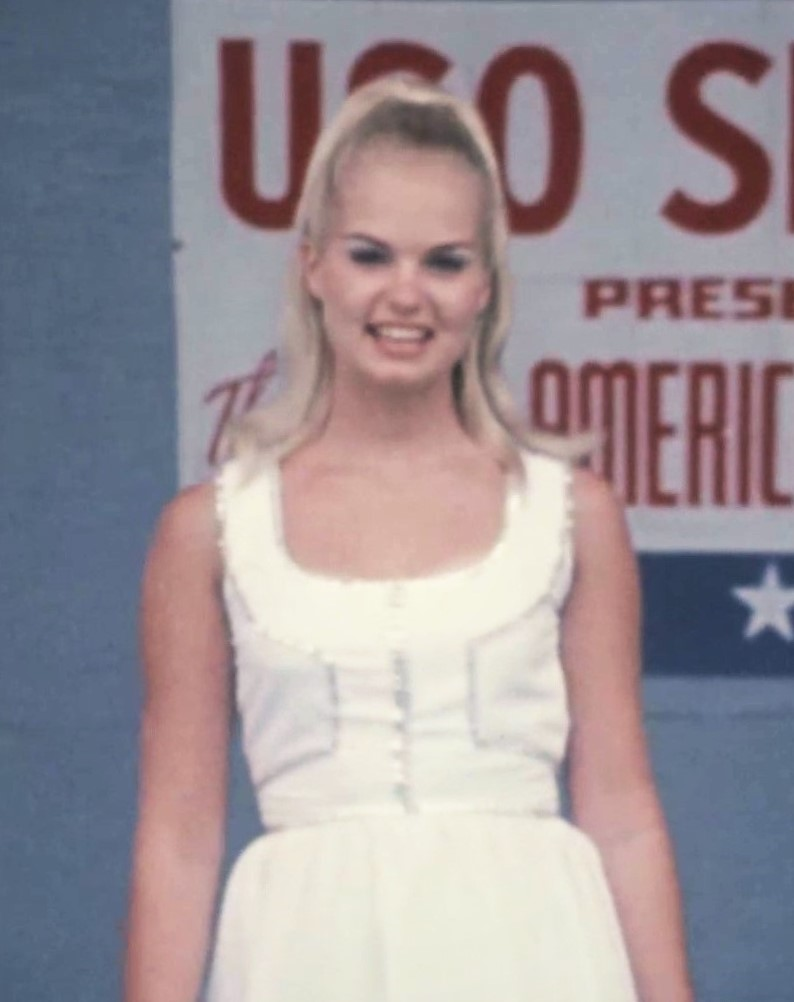
Ford entertains troops at a 1969 Vietnam War USO show

After her freshman year as a gymnast on the trampoline team at the University of Louisiana, Ford took time off from her studies to compete in the Miss America pageant and its preliminaries. Following her year off, she transferred to the University of Illinois at Urbana-Champaign, where she received her bachelor's degree in physical education and was a member of Delta Gamma sorority. Later in life she earned a master's degree in physical education from Western Illinois University.

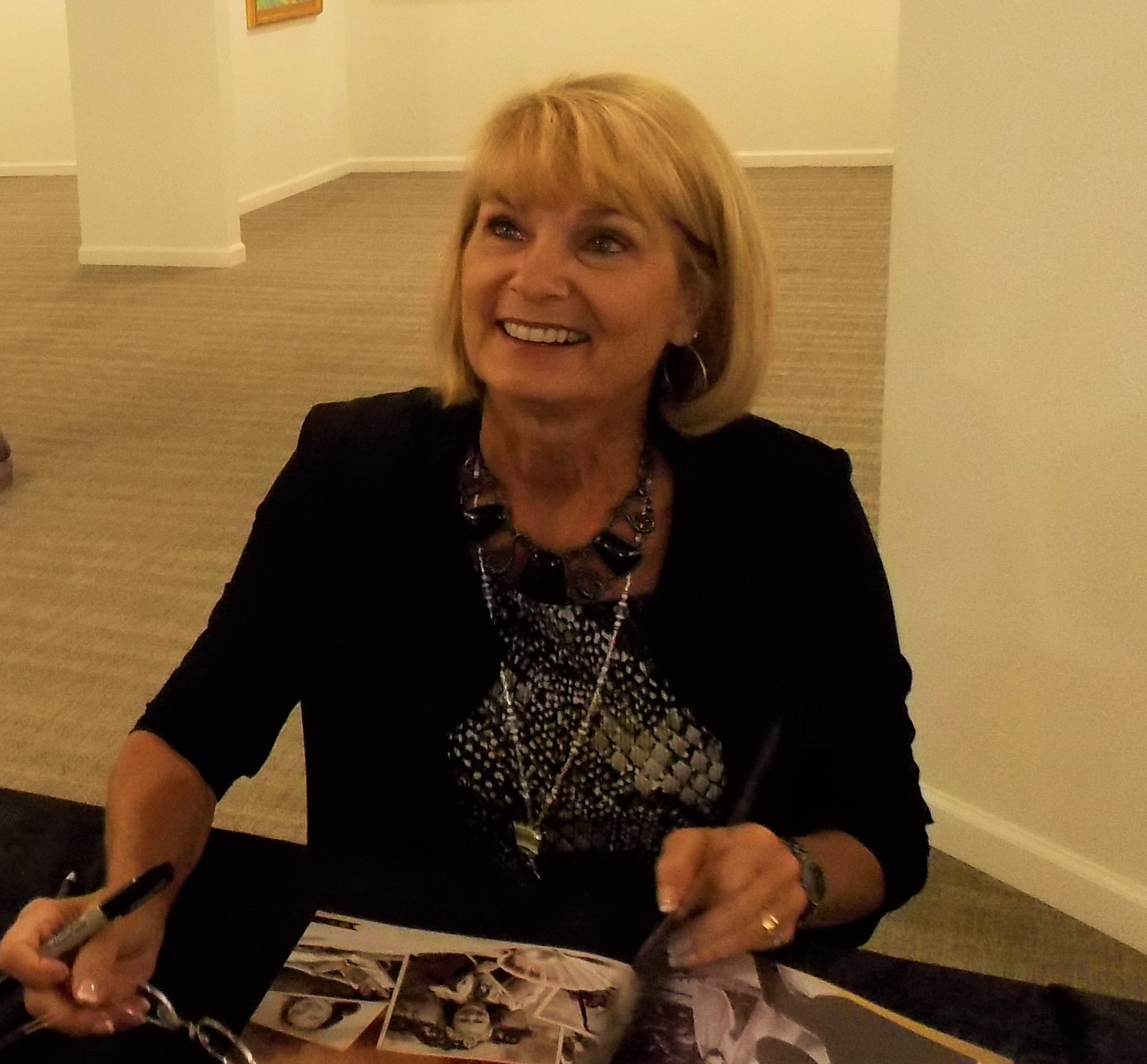
Ford Nash in 2015 at an autograph session

She served on the President's Council on Physical Fitness and Sports for eight years, appointed by presidents Richard Nixon and Gerald Ford. She was an elementary physical education teacher and is now retired, but still coaches golf and basketball.

== Personal life ==
Ford was previously married to Edwin Johnson and had two sons, Brad and Brian. She married James Nash, an attorney, in Geneseo, Illinois, in 1990.

Awards and achievements
Preceded by Debra Dene Barnes	Miss America; 1969	Succeeded by Pamela Eldred
Preceded by Kathryn Myers	Miss Illinois; 1968	Succeeded by Sharon Mitchell
