= Norma Smallwood =

American model (1909–1966)

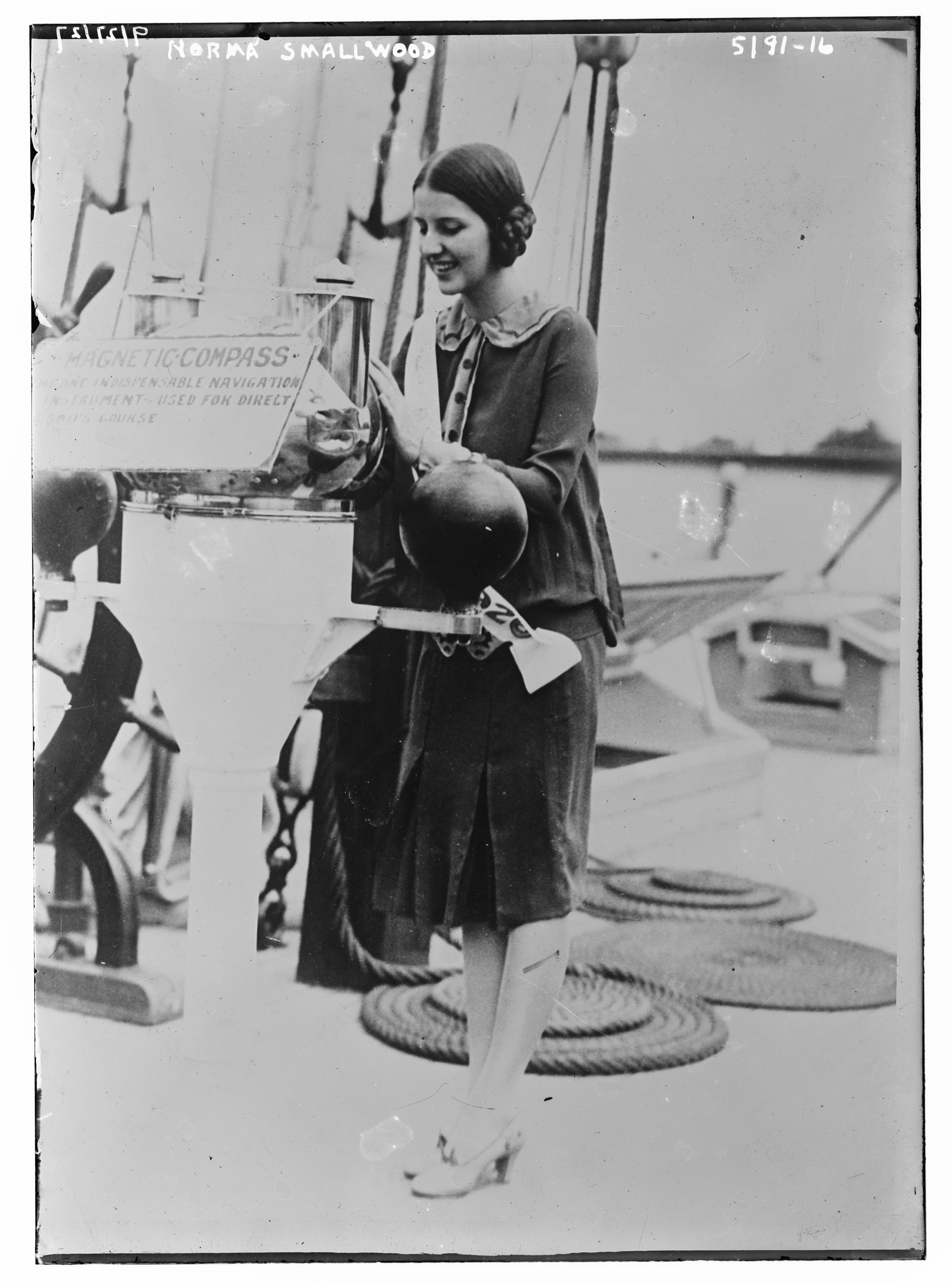
- Smallwood in 1927
- Born: Norma Des Cygne Smallwood; May 12, 1909
- Died: May 8, 1966 (aged 56); Wichita, Kansas
- Education: Oklahoma College for Women
- Title: Miss Tulsa 1926; Miss America 1926
- Predecessor: Fay Lanphier
- Successor: Lois Delander
- Spouses: Thomas Gilcrease (m. 1928; div. 1934) George H. Bruce (m. 1936)
- Children: 1

Norma Des Cygne Smallwood (May 12, 1909 – May 8, 1966) was the winner of the Miss America 1926 pageant.

== Early life ==
Smallwood's hometown was Bristow, Oklahoma. She was the daughter of Edward Smallwood and Mahalia Angela (Robinette) Smallwood. She also had a paternal half sister and half brother. She earned the Miss Tulsa title and graduated from high school at age 16.

== Miss America 1926 ==
At the time she competed for Miss America, Smallwood was a student at the Oklahoma College for Women. Her hobbies included swimming, dancing, and horseback riding, and she served as captain of her college hockey team.

Smallwood captured first place in both the bather's review and the evening gown contest. For the latter, she wore a pale blue velvet gown designed by Paul Nemzershe. The following evening, she was crowned Miss America 1926. Smallwood is noted as being the first self-identified Native American (Cherokee) to win the crown. Despite claiming Cherokee heritage, Smallwood and her family are not listed on the Dawes Rolls and were not Cherokee Nation tribal citizens.

Smallwood wore her long chestnut hair in two braided buns, unlike the bobbed flapper style that was popular at the time. Her measurements were 33-24-33, which also contrasted with the flat-chested style preferred by flappers. The Tulsa World considered Smallwood's win a victory against the nontraditional flappers.

During her year as Miss America, she became the poster girl for Meadows Washing Machines and Westinghouse Electric, in addition to many others. It was said she made approximately $100,000 during her year.

== Later life ==
Though Smallwood had originally planned to return to Oklahoma College for Women after her year as Miss America, she instead accepted an offer to tour the United States on the Orpheum Circuit for $1,500 a week.

Smallwood married oilman Thomas Gilcrease on September 3, 1928. They had a daughter, Des Cygne L'Amour Gilcrease, who was born on June 12, 1929, in Tulsa. The marriage ended in divorce on May 2, 1934, and the father was awarded sole custody of their daughter.

In 1936, Smallwood married George H. Bruce, president of Aladdin Petroleum Corporation.

She died on May 8, 1966, in Wichita, Kansas, aged 56.

Awards and achievements
Preceded by Fay Lanphier	Miss America; 1926	Succeeded by Lois Delander
Preceded by Sue Starkey	Miss Tulsa; 1926	Succeeded by Virginia Howard
