= Miss America 1927 =

7th Miss America pageant

- Date: September 9, 1927
- Presenters: King Neptune (Eddie Dowling)
- Venue: Million Dollar Pier, Atlantic City, New Jersey
- Entrants: 75
- Placements: 15
- Winner: Lois Delander; Illinois

Miss America 1927, the seventh Miss America pageant, was held at the Million Dollar Pier in Atlantic City, New Jersey on Friday, September 9, 1927. The winner was 16-year-old Lois Delander who competed as Miss Illinois. She won the Miss America title on her parents' twentieth wedding anniversary.

After newspaper articles alleged that young women were being falsely lured into the competition with claims of a screen test and the promise of a likely film career, public pressure resulted in the 1927 competition being the last pageant to be held in the 1920s. The next Miss America pageant would not be held until 1933, during the Great Depression.

== Results ==
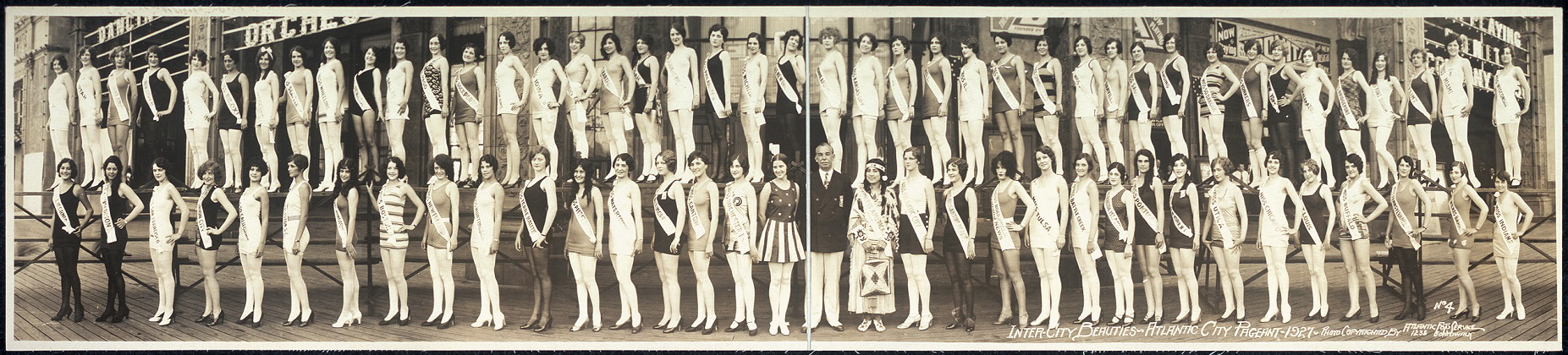
Contestants of the 1927 Miss America Pageant

=== Placements ===
Placement	Contestant
Miss America 1927	Illinois – Lois Delander
1st Runner-Up	Dallas – Moselle Ransome
Top 5	Philadelphia – Kathleen Coyle; Tulsa – Virginia Howard; Hammond – Anne Howe
Top 15	Battle Creek – Charlotte Jane Lowe; Boston – Ethel Beatrice Pierce; Charleston – Claudia Harvin; Huntington – Lillian Ward; New York City – Frieda Louise Mierse; Newark – Carolyn Pierson; Oakland – Ruby Smith; Pittsfield – Martha E. Hick; Rochester – Dorothea Ditmer; Santa Cruz – Bertha Weizel

=== Other awards ===
Award	Contestant
Rolling Chair Parade Winner	New York City – Freida Louise Mierse

== Contestants ==
75 contestants competed for the title.

Represented	Name	Hometown	Age	Awards
Baltimore	Beulah Goldsborough			
Battle Creek	Charlotte Jane Lowe			
Biloxi	Phyllis Hunt			
Boston	Ethel Beatrice Pierce			
Bridgeport	Antoinette Violet	Bridgeport		
(Buffalo, New York) Buffalo	Kay Armstrong			
Canton	Erma Shorwood Steele			
Charleston	Mary Claudia Harvin	Charleston		
Chicago	Myrtle Valsted	Chicago		
Dallas	Moselle Ransome			
Danville	Gladys Vile			
Denver	Elva Yvette Roy			
Elizabeth	Helen Mankus			
El Paso	Mildred Casad			
Flint	Ruth Bushroe			
Fort Worth	Juanita Gilbert			
Gary	Anna May Owens	Gary		
Hammond	Anna Howe			
(Hartford, Connecticut) Hartford	Leona Faith Monoson	Hartford		
Huntington	Lillian Ward	Huntington		
Illinois	Lois Delander	Joliet	16	
Jamestown	Laura Belle Cooper			
Jersey City	Eunice Geiser			
Kalamazoo	Florence Nina Clement			
Kansas City	Marion Kenser			
Lansing	Margherite Strang			
Lockport	Peggy Louise Proctor			
Lynn	Muriel E. Bowers			
Madison	Marjorie Leffingwell			
Miami	Marcia Hands			
Minneapolis	Sylvia Irene Brenner	Minneapolis		
Missouri	Katherine Calloway			
Newark	Carolyn Pierson			
New England	Marion Howarth	Fall River		
New Haven	Dorothy Barton	New Haven		
New Orleans	Gladys Renya Moore	New Orleans		
New York City	Freida Louise Mierse			Rolling Chair Parade Winner
Oakland	Ruby Smith			
Ohio	Evelyn Wilgus	Russells Point		
Passiac	Harriet Rita Shelby			
Pennsylvania	Florence Koons			
Philadelphia	Kathleen Coyle			
Pittsburgh	Mary Millnack			
Pittsfield	Martha E. Hick			
Pontiac	Margaret Tinney			
Rhode Island	June Frances Costello	Providence		
Rochester	Dorothea B. Ditmer			
Saginaw	Charlotte Elaine Bowman			
San Francisco	Naoma Farrand			
Santa Cruz	Bertha Weizel			
Seattle	Eleanor Maddieux			
South Bend	Hilda Koch	South Bend		
South Dakota	Ramona Pearl Sorenson	Lemmon	18	
Southern California	Louise Heathman			
Spokane	Eva King			
Springfield	Anna G. Bernard	Springfield		
Storm Lake	Geneva Roberts	Storm Lake	19	
Terre Haute	Vera Haspal			
Tulsa	Virginia Howard	Tulsa		
Union City	Sue Hoch			
Utah	Esther Kilpatrick	Salt Lake City		
Utica	Margaret Lockwood			
(Washington, D.C.) Washington D.C.	Gladys Cookman			
Watertown	Eva M. Bergman			
Western New York	Betty Schwartz			
Wheeling	Mildred Dorothy Bright	Wheeling		
Wichita	Mildred Orr			
Wilkes-Barre	Esther J. Cantor			
Wisconsin	Virginia Hillyer	Fort Atkinson	17	
Worcester	Dorothy M. Rawson			
Yonkers	Emma Sackett			
