= Arthur H. Hider =

- Born: 1870; London, England
- Died: 1952 (aged 81–82)
- Known for: Painter and commercial illustrator

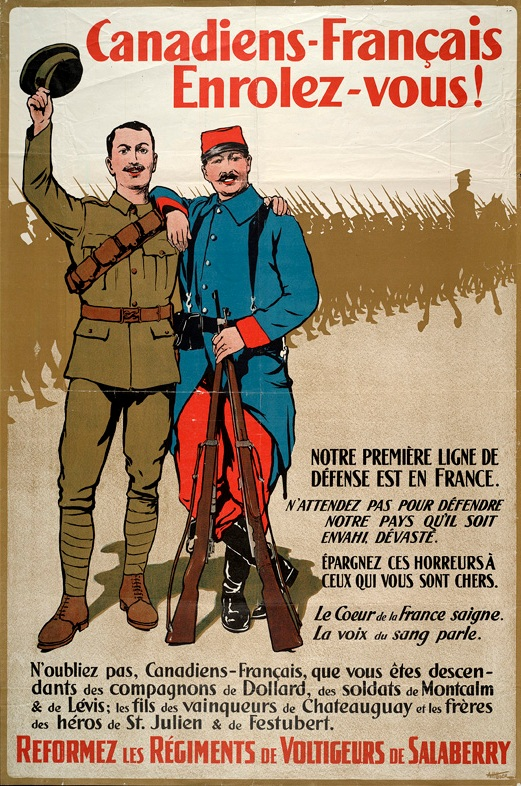
Canadiens-français enrolez-vous! (French-Canadians - Enlist!) by Arthur H. Hider, 1914-1918

Arthur H. Hider (1870–1952), was a Canadian painter and commercial illustrator. Hider was born in London, England. He moved to Canada at age two.

He became an apprentice at a lithographer in Toronto, Canada when he was fifteen. He went on to work for Rolph-Clark-Stone for sixty years. Much of his work consisted of illustrating calendars. Gerlach Barlow Co. commissioned several of his paintings for their calendars. His art depicting Robin Hood for the cover of the Robin Hood Flour Cook Book was painted before the 1912 name change; but it continued to be used in promotions for many years.

Hider was also known for his paintings illustrating the Boer War. His colour print Canadians at the Battle of Paardeberg, February 1900, (1901) is a major symbol of Canadian participation in South Africa, despite the artist never actually having seen the frontlines. Haider's print differs strongly from eyewitness accounts of the war, which feature a more barren and dry landscape.
