= Debra Dene Barnes =

American music educator and former beauty pageant participant

Debra Snodgrass
- Born: Debra Dene Barnes; September 6, 1947 (age 78); Moran, Kansas, U.S
- Education: Kansas State College (BA, MA)
- Title: Miss America 1968
- Predecessor: Jane Jayroe
- Successor: Judith Ford
- Spouses: Mitchell Miles (m. 1969) Bill Snodgrass (died 2023)
- Children: 2

Debra Dene Barnes (born September 6, 1947) is an American music educator and former beauty pageant participant who was crowned Miss America 1968.

== Early life and education ==
Born Debra Dene Barnes, she was raised in Moran, Kansas. Upon graduation from high school, she attended the Kansas State College in Pittsburg, Kansas (now Pittsburg State University), where she majored in music. She then earned a master's degree in Musical Performance, also from Kansas State College.

=== Pageantry ===
After winning the Miss Kansas pageant, she competed in the Miss America pageant. A talented pianist, she played the theme from Born Free as her talent entry. During her farewell address at the 1968 pageant, her speech was interrupted by protesters from New York Radical Women, who unfurled a bed sheet from the balcony that said "Women's Liberation" and began to shout "Women's Liberation!" and "No more Miss America!" as part of the Miss America protest. They were quickly removed by police but drew coverage by newspapers from across the United States.

=== Later career ===
Barnes is an associate professor of piano studies, elementary music, and staff accompanist at Missouri Southern State University in Joplin, Missouri. She has over 35 years of piano teaching experience, in both private instruction and “class piano” format. Barnes is the worship leader at Faith Life Worship Center in Carthage, Missouri, where she has served for many years. Barnes won the Wadill Chamber Music Competition held at Pittsburg State University in March 2007. She performed Chopin's Concerto No. 2 in F Minor with the Southeast Kansas Symphony in April 2008.

== Personal life ==
Barnes married her college sweetheart Mitchell Miles in 1969. They had two daughters before divorcing. She later married Bill Snodgrass.

Awards and achievements
Preceded by Jane Jayroe	Miss America; 1968	Succeeded by Judith Ford
Preceded by Betty Louise Fox	Miss Kansas; 1967	Succeeded by Kandee Kae Kline
