= Adelaide Hiebel =

American artist and illustrator

- Born: 1885; New Hope, Wisconsin
- Died: 1965 (aged 79–80); Santa Ana, California
- Education: Art Institute of Chicago
- Known for: Illustrator
- Patrons: Gerlach Barklow Co., Joliet, Illinois

Adelaide Hiebel (1885–1965) was an artist and illustrator who worked for the Gerlach Barklow Co. in Joliet, Illinois, a manufacturer of art calendars. Hiebel preferred to work in pastels, and was known for her photographic detail and portraits of women, especially "women and dogs, mothers with infants, infant portraits and small children in cute situations."

== Biography ==
Adelaide Hiebel was born in New Hope, Wisconsin in 1885. She studied at the Art Institute of Chicago with Zula Kenyon, and taught art at Oshkosh College in 1916. Zula Kenyon recommended her for work at Gerlach Barklow Co. She moved to Joliet, Illinois to work with the company in 1918, and was given the opportunity to work from a home studio. Gerlach Barklow calendars were purchased by businesses to be given to their important customers as gifts. Many of the company's artists were women, or local residents. In Joliet Hiebel lived with her husband, who was involved in the "liquor trade", and met an untimely death. Adelaide Hiebel was known for her large parties, which attracted nationally known artists, and were financed by her earnings of as much as $10,000 per painting. Fifty of Hiebel's documented works survive.

A brother, Ben, also worked for Gerlach Barklow. A sister died when she was young. "Adelaide always said her sister was an angel who sat on her shoulder and guided her work."

Hiebel's most famous work was a pastel of Lois Delander, Miss America 1927, wearing a white bathing suit.

She moved to California to retire in 1955, and died in 1965 in Santa Ana, California.
