= Hieb =

Hieb is a surname. Notable people with the surname include:

- James Hieb, American politician
- Richard Hieb (born 1955), American astronaut

== See also ==
- Hiebel
