= Northside College Preparatory High School =

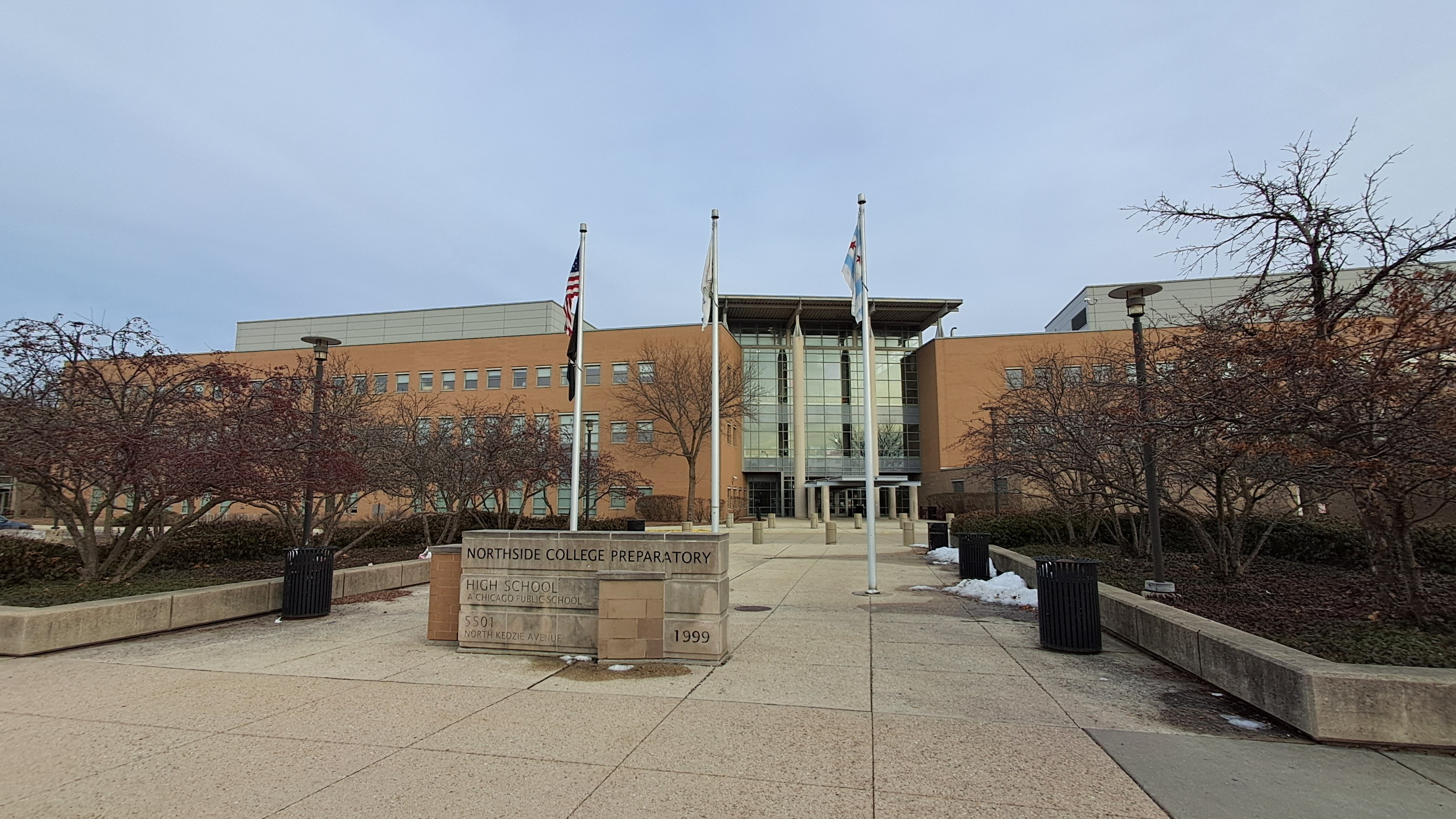

Location
- 5501 N. Kedzie Avenue; Chicago, Illinois 60625-3923; United States; 41°58′53″N 87°42′28″W

Information
- Type: Public college preparatory selective enrollment high school
- Established: 1999; 27 years ago
- School district: Chicago Public Schools
- Principal: Dr. Patricia Stuber
- Teaching staff: 64.00 (FTE) (2021–22)
- Grades: 9–12
- Enrollment: 1,041 (2022–23)
- Student to teacher ratio: 16.05:1 (2021–22)
- Campus type: Urban
- Color: Maroon Silver
- Athletics conference: Chicago Public League
- Mascot: Mustang
- Accreditation: North Central Association of Colleges and Schools
- Newspaper: The Hoofbeat
- Website: northsideprep.org

Northside College Preparatory High School (commonly referred to as Northside College Prep, Northside Prep, NCP, or simply Northside) is a public four-year selective enrollment high school located in the North Park neighborhood on the north side of Chicago, Illinois, United States. Founded in 1999, it was the first new CPS high school to be built in 20 years. It is a selective enrollment school, and teaches only at the Honors and AP levels (excluding the P.E. department).

In 2014, it was ranked #3 in the nation by Newsweek. The school's establishment, part of former Chicago Mayor Richard M. Daley's plan to reinvent the city's public school system, generated controversy in the city and in the education community. The facilities were built with a $44.7 million budget that critics said could have better served other schools in the city.

== History ==
Founded in 1999, it was the first new Chicago Public School (CPS) high school to be built in 20 years. It is a selective enrollment school, and teaches only at the Honors and AP levels (excluding the P.E. department). Northside has earned a reputation for academic excellence, and has been consistently ranked as the #1 high school in Illinois.

The school's establishment, part of former Chicago Mayor Richard M. Daley's plan to reinvent the city's public school system, generated controversy in the city and in the education community. The facilities were built with a $52.5 million budget that critics said could have better served other schools in the city.

== Admission ==
Admission to Northside Prep follows the selective enrollment application system. Factors considered in the application include a student's grades from 7th grade, HSAT High School Admissions Test results, and socio-economic status. For the 2018–19 school year, 480 students (44%) were eligible for the Free Lunch Program. Before the 2021 school year standardized state test results were also used for admission.

=== Demographics ===
The demographic breakdown by race/ethnicity of the students enrolled for the 2019–2020 school year was:

View source data.

Enrollment by Race/Ethnicity
School Year	American Indian / Alaska Native	Asian	Black	Hispanic	Native Hawaiian / Pacific Islander	White	Two or More Races
2011–12	0.7%	24.4%	6.3%	22.6%	0.4%	42.6%	3.1%
2014–15	0%	17%	8%	27%	0%	38%	9%
2015–16	0%	19%	9%	28%	0%	32%	13%
2016–17	0%	19%	8%	29%	0%	30%	13%
2017–18	1%	20%	7%	30%	1%	29%	13%
2018–19	0.5%	19.7%	7.3%	29.8%	0.5%	29.3%	13%
2019–20	0.5%	20.3%	7.5%	29.8%	0.9%	26.9%	14.1%
2020-21	0.4%	19.9%	6.7%	29.6%	1.1%	31.6%	10.8%
2021-22	0%	19.5%	5.5%	30.4%	1.3%	31.2%	11.8%
2022-23	0%	20.7%	5.9%	28.9%	1.2%	34.8%	8.2%
2023-24	0%	21%	5.6%	28.8%	0%	38.3%	5.2%

== College admissions and rankings ==
Northside College Prep is well known for the success of its students in the college admissions process, with over a quarter of the senior class gaining admission to the nation's top universities. Over 99% of the graduating senior class matriculates to college. In addition, the student body as a whole earns a large amount of financial aid from various sources.

- In 2018 Northside was rated #2 in Illinois and #82 in the nation by U.S. News & World Report
- In 2016 Northside was rated the #8 high school in the nation by "Newsweek"
- In 2014 Northside was rated the #3 high school in the nation by "Newsweek"
- In 2013 Northside was rated #1 in Illinois and #33 in the nation by U.S. News & World Report, and was rated the #2 public high school in the nation by "The Best Schools"
- In 2011 Northside was rated #1 in Illinois and #24 in the nation by Newsweek

== Curriculum/scheduling and colloquium ==
With the exception of physical education classes, all courses in Northside are either Honors or (AP) (Advanced Placement). Northside has 24 advanced placement classes. Northside's math program is unique from most other high schools in that it uses the Interactive Mathematics Program, also known as IMP, instead of a traditional math track. IMP is very writing based, with students writing portfolios and projects instead of simply solving mathematical equations. Aside from four IMP courses, Northside also offers, AP Statistics, AP Calculus BC, AP Calculus AB, Multi-Variable Calculus, Linear Algebra, Differential Equations, and Discrete Math.

Northside also offers special education services for incoming students with diagnosed disabilities. The school's Office of Specialized Services helps to arrange appropriate accommodations. Given its extremely competitive academic environment, Northside successfully lobbied the Chicago Board of Education to eliminate class rankings. This effort was led by former principal Dr. James Lalley.

Northside's classes run on a block schedule. Classes meet twice a week: on Mondays and Thursdays or Tuesdays and Fridays. The school day used to start at 8:16 a.m. and ended at 3:30 p.m. until the 2014–15 school year when the school day at Northside now starts at 8:00 a.m. and ends at 3:04 p.m. (except for Colloquium schedule where it ends at 3:00 p.m.). Each block is 100 minutes long with an 8 minute passing period between blocks. During five-day weeks, Wednesdays are reserved for an approximately two-hour non-credit class called Colloquium. Dozens of colloquia are offered, with a wide range of interest such as motorcycle repair, computers, robotics, consumer-education, sewing, quilting, art, photography, paper craft, and Asian calligraphy. Classes are chosen by students twice a year (every semester, or otherwise it is year-long); availability is dependent on popularity and student's year ranking: seniors get first pick, then juniors, sophomores, and lastly freshmen. Colloquium options vary from year to year.

Before and after colloquium on Wednesdays, Northside College Prep has Flex Blocks. Flexes 1 and 2 meet in the morning before Colloquium; and Flexes 3 and 4 follow Colloquium. Typically, Flex Blocks are classes that students can re-pick every week to meet their own needs. For instance if a student needs help in math homework, they can choose a math tutoring class for one of their Flex Blocks (each block is 45 minutes long). Due to CPS vendor issues, the websites used by Northside students to pick Flex Blocks couldn't be used. Students instead chose eight Flex Blocks each semester which rotated Flexes 1-4 and 5-8 by week. Northside is working on creating their own website that will bring back week-by-week options.

== Sustainability ==
In the summer of 2010, Northside installed a 105-panel solar thermal system on the southern half of its roof. These solar panels work to heat the school's pool and have the capacity to provide hot water to the entire school. This project was headed by Northside science teacher Mr. Mike Coy, and Alexandra Rojek, Northside's 2011 valedictorian.

Located behind the school is the Joy Garden, a continuation of Northside's efforts to become a more sustainable institution. The Joy Garden is 10,000 square feet and situated adjacent to the eastern front of the building. It was built entirely through the efforts of students with the help of Urban Habitat Chicago. The garden is equipped with the latest in green technology, including a self-sustainable storm water management system and permeable concrete. However, it is more than just ecologically functional and friendly. This garden was built with a particular emphasis on providing a stimulating environment for special needs students. It extends from a traditional garden environment to one that is accessible to all students.

== Athletics ==
Northside competes in the Chicago Public League (CPL) and is a member of the Illinois High School Association (IHSA). The Boy's Varsity Cross Country Team won the IHSA Regional title in 2008 and was the City Champion in 2009. The Boy's Varsity Track and Field Team won the IHSA Sectional Title in 2013 and 2016. The Girl's Varsity Cross Country Team won the IHSA Regional title in 2011, 2015, 2016, and 2020. The Girls Varsity Cross Country Team won the IHSA Sectional Title in 2016. The Girl's Varsity Cross Country Team was the City Champion in 2014, 2015, 2016, and 2017. The Girl's Varsity Track and Field Team won the IHSA Sectional Title in 2012. In 2016, under Coach Jon Gordon, the Northside College Prep Varsity Women Cross Country Team became the only CPS School to ever finish in the Top 6 in the State Cross Country Championships. The girl's varsity softball team were regional champions in 2011–12, 2012–13; and became the city champion. In 2013, The girls' varsity volleyball finished first in their conference (Red North). In 2010 the women's soccer team were runners-up in the City Championship tournament and in 2014 they won an IHSA Section title. Pom-Pons team placed 1st in the Chicago Public Schools (CPS) city championship and placed 2nd in the IDTA state competition in 2013. Girls Swimming CPS city champions tie with Lane Tech in 2012 and champions in 2014. Boys Swimming CPS champions 2016 and 2017. In 2018, Northside formed its first Women's Badminton team, winning 1st place in Doubles, and finishing 2nd overall as a team in the very first CPS City Championship. Sports Offerings:

- Fall:
  - Men's and Women's Cross Country
  - Men's and Women's Golf
  - Men's Soccer
  - Men's 16" Softball
  - Women's Swimming/Diving
  - Women's Tennis
  - Women's Volleyball
  - Women's Flag Football
- Winter:
  - Men's and Women's Basketball
  - Men's and Women's Bowling
  - Cheerleading
  - Chess
  - Pom-Pons
  - Men's Swimming/Diving
  - Wrestling
- Spring:
  - Women's Badminton
  - Men's Baseball
  - Men's and Women's Lacrosse
  - Women's Soccer
  - Women's Softball
  - Men's Tennis
  - Men's and Women's Track & Field
  - Men's Volleyball
  - Men's and Women's Water Polo

== Notable alumni ==
- Miss Alex White - musician
- Eve Ewing - author, poet, and sociologist
- Minhal Baig - film writer and director
- Tasha - musician
- Spencer Tweedy - musician
- H. Joey Cardona - biologist
- Marisa Buchheit - soprano and beauty pageant titleholder
