= Hebel =

Hebel can refer to:

- An alternative transliteration of the Hebrew name of the Biblical figure Abel
- Johann Peter Hebel (1760–1826), German poet
- Hebel, Queensland, a town in the Shire of Balonne, Australia
- A brand of aerated autoclaved concrete from CSR Limited
