= Friedrich Hiebel =

Friedrich Hiebel (10 February 1903, Vienna, Austria - 16 October 1989, Dornach, Switzerland) was an Austrian anthroposophist, journalist and writer.

Friedrich Hiebel graduated from the School of Kremsmünster Abbey. In 1921 he met Rudolf Steiner, at whose suggestion he studied history at Vienna University. He took his doctorate there in 1928 with his thesis on Wilhelm von Schütz. From 1929 he worked as a teacher at the Waldorf School in Essen, first, then from 1930 in Stuttgart and from 1934 in Vienna, as an editor for the journal Art Education. In 1939, Hiebel emigrated to the United States and for the next seven years was in New York as a Waldorf teacher and editor of Education as an Art, then worked as a lecturer and professor at several universities. In 1945 Hiebel married the sculptor Beulah Emmet. They had two children.

In 1961, Hiebel moved with his family to Dornach, Switzerland where in 1963 he became a member of the board of the Anthroposophical Society and was appointed Albert Steffen's successor as head of the Arts and Humanities Section at the Goetheanum. In 1966 he took over the editorship of the weekly publication Das Goetheanum, which he held until his death in 1989.

His published writings include Goethe's Message of Beauty in Our Twentieth Century World. More of his published writings are listed at Friedrich Hiebel in German Wikipedia and at German National Library.
