= Gerlach Barklow Co. =

Defunct art calendar factory located in Joliet, Illinois

- Industry: Art calendar factory and advertising company
- Founded: 1907
- Defunct: 1971
- Headquarters: Joliet, Illinois, United States

The Gerlach Barklow Co. was an art calendar factory located in Joliet, Illinois, which was "one of the largest calendar and advertising companies in America." the company was founded in 1907. The factory employed over 1,500 people at its peak in the 1950s.

Artists who worked for Gerlach Barklow included Arthur H. Hider, Bradshaw Crandell, Fletcher C. Ransom, Adelaide Hiebel, and Zula Kenyon. Many of the company's artists were women, or local residents, and many local residents served as artists' models. Lois Delander of Joliet, better known as Miss America 1927, was among the most famous models. A Gerlach-Barklow fan is displayed in the collection of the Oakland Museum of California.

Gerlach Barklow calendars were purchased by businesses to be given to their important customers as gifts.
