= This Is My Country =

Song
- Written: 1940
- Genre: Patriotic song
- Composer: Al Jacobs
- Lyricist: Don Raye

"This Is My Country" is an American patriotic song composed in 1940. The lyrics are by Don Raye and the music is by Al Jacobs. Fred Waring and His Pennsylvanians were the first to record the song, in 1942. The song has played at the end of Walt Disney World and Disneyland fireworks shows. It is the official song of the Southern Dames of America.

== Lyrics ==
The song begins slowly, opening with this introductory verse:

What difference if I hail from North or South
Or from the East or West?
My heart is filled with love
For all of these.
I only know I swell with pride
And deep within my breast
I thrill to see Old Glory
Paint the breeze.

A second, rarely performed, verse reads,

With hand upon my heart, I thank the Lord for this, my native land, for all I love is here within her gates
My soul is rooted deeply in the soil on which I stand, for these are mine, my own United States!

It then swings into a march tempo for the chorus.

The song is made notable by the fact that it honors both Americans by birth and choice. The first chorus reads:

This is my country
Land of my birth
This is my country
Grandest on Earth

While the second chorus (sung on a repeat, as the introduction is usually not repeated) instead reads:

This is my country
Land of my choice
This is my country
Hear my proud voice.

Both versions join together at the ending:

I pledge thee my allegiance
America the bold
For this is my country
To have and to hold
