= Miss America 1926 =

6th Miss America pageant

- Date: September 10, 1926
- Presenters: King Neptune (De Wolfe Hopper)
- Venue: Million Dollar Pier Ballroom, Atlantic City, New Jersey
- Entrants: 73
- Placements: 15
- Winner: Norma Smallwood; Tulsa

Miss America 1926, the sixth Miss America pageant, was held at the Million Dollar Pier in Atlantic City, New Jersey on Friday, September 10, 1926. In selecting the new Miss America, it was the opinion of the judges that not only did the winner, Norma Smallwood, Miss Tulsa, have an excellent figure, but also possessed a smile like that of the Mona Lisa.

Smallwood was the first Miss America to also win the award for "the most beautiful girl in evening gown" at the highly-promoted National Beauty Tournament held during pageant week of the twenties. She proved to be an enormously popular selection.

Upon victory, Smallwood, who was an art major at Oklahoma College for Women in her sophomore year, stated she "might leave school for a year" and looked at her tenure as Miss America from a financial standpoint. She became the poster girl for Meadows Washing Machines and Westinghouse Electric, in addition to many others. It was said she made approximately $100,000 during her year.

One of the finalists, Rosebud Blondell, became the successful Hollywood actress Joan Blondell.

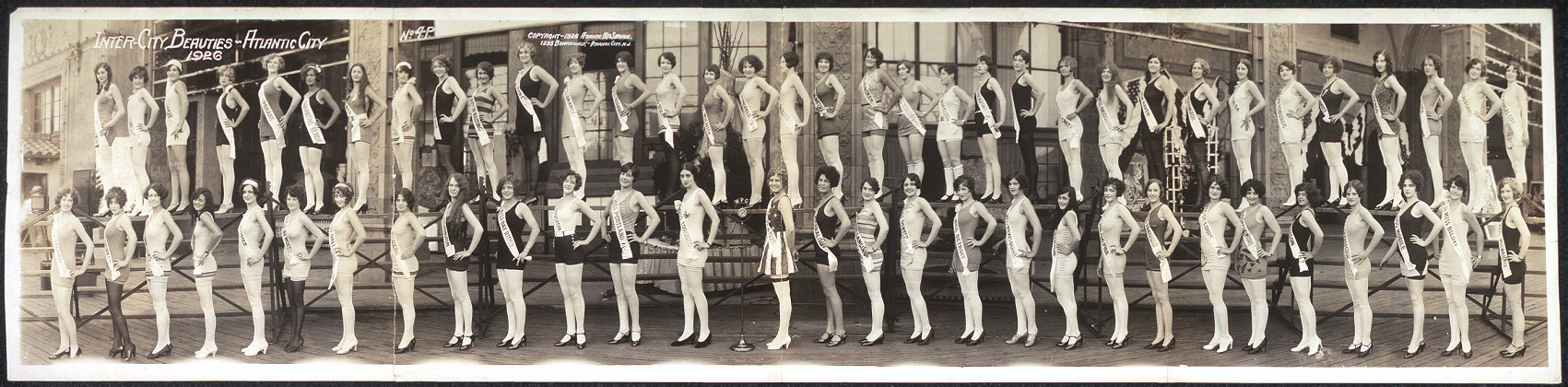
Pictured are 63 of the 73 contestants of the 1926 Miss America Pageant

== Results ==
=== Placements ===
Placement	Contestant
Miss America 1926	Tulsa – Norma Smallwood
1st Runner-Up	District of Columbia – Marjorie Joosting
Top 15	Bridgeport – Florence Harriet Green; Dallas – Rosebud Blondell; Denver – Deloras Conrad; Greater New York – Ruth K. Patterson; Kansas City – Margaret Jordan; Lansing – Joyce Jean Hurd; Newark – Mildred Morlock; Norfolk – Eleanor V. Reid; Orange – Evelynne Jeanne Crowell; Philadelphia – Anna Mae Reefer; Seattle – Leona Natalia Fengler; St. Louis – Corinne Groves; Yonkers – Catherine Kennedy

=== Other awards ===
Award	Contestant
Evening Dress	Tulsa – Norma Smallwood
Rolling Chair Parade Winner	Greater New York – Ruth K. Patterson
Swimsuit Winner	Tulsa – Norma Smallwood

== Contestants ==
State/City	Name	Age	Placement	Award	Notes
Baltimore, Maryland	Mildred Adam	22			
Battle Creek, Michigan	Gertrude Fisher	19			
Bay Ridge, New York	Florence Meyer				
Biloxi, Mississippi	Mabel Riley	17			
Boston, Massachusetts	Mary "May" Mudge				
Bridgeport, Connecticut	Florence Harriet Green	19	Top 15		
Brigantine Beach, New Jersey	Mary Mavretic				
California	Aloha Eugenia Porter	18			
Charleston, South Carolina	Dorothy Brickman	16			
Chicago, Illinois	Mae Greene				
Colorado	Jeanette Roland				
Dallas, Texas	Rosebud Blondell	18	Top 15		Later became a known actress by the name of Joan Blondell
Denver, Colorado	Deloras Conrad	20	Top 15		
Detroit, Michigan	Ruth Mae Fowler	17			
Duluth, Minnesota	Florence Fuller	18			
Elizabeth, New Jersey	Lucy Taylor				
Florida	Margaret Jennell Tate				
Fort Worth, Texas	Winnie Law	18			
Greater New York	Ruth K. Patterson	17	Top 15	Rolling Chair Parade Winner	
Hartford, Connecticut	Doris Loretta Beaupre	16			
Hoboken, New Jersey	Anita H. Limbacker	23 (26)			
Houston, Texas	Zayda Lord	20			
Huntington, West Virginia	Olive Davis	21			
Indiana	Wanda Marie Sobczak	20			
Kansas City, Missouri	Marguerite Jordan	20	Top 15		
Lansing, Michigan	Joyce Jean Hurd	19	Top 15		
Lockport, Massachusetts	Mary Robinson	19			
Louisville, Kentucky	Gladys Imogene King				
Madison, Wisconsin	Dorothy Seller	21			
Milwaukee, Wisconsin	Florence Andrees	19			
Minneapolis, Minnesota	Helen Katherine Douglas	16			
Missouri	Ruby Wallace				
Mobile, Alabama	Vivian McDowell	19			
Newark, New Jersey	Mildred Morlock	18	Top 15		
New Haven, Connecticut	Molla Barnett	18			
New Orleans, Louisiana	Edna du Vernay	19			
Norfolk, Virginia	Eleanor V. Reid	18	Top 15		
Omaha, Nebraska	Anne Kathleen Foucar				
Orange, New Jersey	Evelynne Jeanne Crowell	16	Top 15		
Philadelphia, Pennsylvania	Anna Mae Reefer	19	Top 15		
Pittsburgh, Pennsylvania	Thelma Williams	20			
Portland, Oregon	Maxine Jennings	17			
Portsmouth, Massachusetts	Rosa Lee Irving	16			
Pottsville, Pennsylvania	Esther Weissinger				
San Francisco, California	Eleanor Twohig	18			
Scranton, Pennsylvania	Ila E. Williams	17			
Seattle, Washington	Leona Fengler	23	Top 15		
South Dakota	Mary Davis	20			
Spokane, Washington	Glorian Smith				
Springfield, Massachusetts	Muriel Borek	19			
St. Louis, Missouri	Corinne Groves	19	Top 15		
Tacoma, Washington	Dorothy Rothermell	17			
Tulsa, Oklahoma	Norma Smallwood	17	Winner	Swimsuit Award Evening Dress Award	First Native American to win Miss America
Union City, New Jersey	Elizabeth Welch				
Utah	Doretta "Dora" Carstensen	16			
(Washington, D.C.) Washington D.C.	Marjorie Joesting	22	1st runner-up		
Wheeling, West Virginia	Mary Cecilia Cresap	19			
Wichita, Kansas	Ruth Richardson				
Wildwood Gables, New Jersey	Kathleen Coyle				
Wilkes-Barre, Pennsylvania	Helen Violet Grant	19			
Yonkers, New York	Catherine Kennedy	18	Top 15		

=== Ineligible Participants ===
Representing	Name	Age	Notes
Australia	Beryl Mills	19	First winner of Miss Australia Quest
Toronto, Canada	Jean Ford Tolmie	21	First Miss Toronto
Winnipeg, Canada	Lillian McNaughton	18	
Okanogan Tribe (Wenatchee, WA)	Jessie Jim	19	Miss Princess America II
