= Marisa Buchheit =

American soprano and beauty pageant titleholder

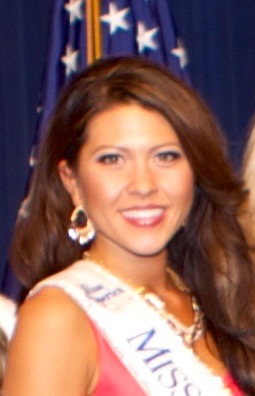
- Buchheit in 2014
- Born: Marisa Therese Buchheit
- Education: DePaul University; Cleveland Institute of Music
- Height: 5 ft 8 in (1.73 m)
- Beauty pageant titleholder
- Title: Miss Cook County 2008; Miss Maple City 2010; Miss Cleveland 2011; Miss Chicago 2012; Miss Heart of Illinois 2013; Miss Chicago 2014; Miss Illinois 2014
- Hair color: Brunette
- Major competition: Miss America 2015

Marisa Therese Buchheit is an American soprano and beauty pageant titleholder from Chicago, Illinois, who was crowned Miss Illinois 2014 in June 2014. She competed in the nationally televised Miss America 2015 competition in September 2014.

== Early life and education ==
Buchheit is a native of Chicago, Illinois, and a graduate of Northside College Preparatory H.S. She earned a Bachelor of Music Degree in Vocal Performance with Academic Honors and a German Minor from the Cleveland Institute of Music (CIM) in Cleveland, Ohio. As a student at CIM, she was elected President of the Mu Phi Epsilon professional music fraternity and served for 2 terms. Her parents are Paul and Amorn Buchheit, and her brother is composer Joseph Buchheit.

== Pageant career ==
=== Early pageants ===
Buchheit began her pageant career competing in Thai Cultural Pageants at the Wat Dhammaram Buddhist Temple on Chicago's South Side. She placed 1st Runner Up at the Miss Songkran Festival Pageant in May 2005. In 2006, she competed in the Miss Illinois Teen USA Pageant. She placed in the Top 15 as one of 180 contestants.

=== Vying for Miss Illinois ===
As a senior in high school at Northside College Preparatory H.S., Buchheit competed in several local preliminaries of the Miss America Organization. She was named 1st Runner Up to Miss West Cook County 2008. The original titleholder stepped down, and Buchheit was given the title and opportunity to compete at Miss Illinois 2008. She was named the Non-Finalist Talent Winner with her performance of "O mio babbino caro" by Puccini. In 2012, Buchheit returned as Miss Chicago and was named a Top 10 Finalist in the Miss Illinois 2012 competition. Buchheit returned as Miss Heart of Illinois in 2013 and was named 3rd Runner Up to Miss Illinois. In her final year of eligibility, Buchheit came back as Miss Chicago and won the Miss Illinois 2014 title and the Top Talent Award.

=== Vying for Miss Ohio ===
During her college years at the Cleveland Institute of Music, Buchheit competed in the Miss Ohio pageant twice. In 2010 she went to the statewide competition as Miss Maple City, and was named 2nd Runner Up to Miss Ohio 2010. She was a double preliminary winner, winning the Swimsuit and Talent Preliminary Awards. She also won the Semi-Finalist Interview Award. She made the Top 10 as Miss Greater Cleveland in 2011.

=== Miss Chicago ===
Two-time winner of the Miss Chicago Scholarship Pageant, in 2012 and 2014.

=== Miss Illinois 2014 ===
On February 8, 2014, Buchheit was crowned Miss Chicago 2014. She entered the Miss Illinois pageant at the Marion Cultural and Civic Center in June 2014 as one of 31 qualifiers for the state title. She was named a Preliminary Talent Winner for her performance of "Je veux vivre" from the opera Roméo et Juliette by Gounod. Her platform was "From STEM to STEAM", with a mission of keeping the fine arts in Illinois schools.

Buchheit won the competition on Saturday, June 14, 2014, receiving her crown from outgoing Miss Illinois 2013 Brittany Smith. She earned more than $15,000 in scholarship money as well as other prizes from the state pageant. As Miss Illinois, her activities included public appearances across the state of Illinois.

=== Vying for Miss America 2015 ===
Buchheit was Illinois' representative at the Miss America 2015 pageant in Atlantic City, New Jersey, in September 2014. In the televised finale on September 14, 2014, she was not named a semi-finalist but was awarded a $3,000 scholarship. Her black and white swimsuit received special attention during broadcast preceding the competition.

=== Miss Illinois USA 2018 ===
Buchheit later competed at Miss Illinois USA 2018 pageant and representing Lincoln Park in her final year of eligibility in the Miss USA division, finishing 1st runner-up to eventual winner Karolina Jasko.

== Singing career ==
Buchheit is an aspiring professional opera singer and an award-winning vocalist. She has performed with symphony orchestras, in chamber music concerts, outdoor festivals, and in fully staged musicals and operas around the world.

=== Significant performances ===
- Queen of the Night in the Magic Flute with the Southern Illinois Music Festival. June 2018.
- Holiday Concerts with Elgin Symphony Orchestra. December 2015 and 2016.
- Romance Concert with Peoria Symphony Orchestra. February 2016.
- Season Opener Concert at the Riverfront with Peoria Symphony Orchestra. September 2015.
- Four opera productions with Wichita Grand Opera. 2015 and 2016.
- Très Belle Performance at Ravinia's Bennett Gordon Hall for Reach*Teach*Play students. May 2014.
- Performed Susanna in Le nozze di Figaro in the TusciaOpera Festival in Viterbo, Italy. July 2013.
- Solo Recital at the Chicago Cultural Center. March 2013.
- Performed Zerlina in Don Giovanni with American Chamber Opera in Chicago, Illinois. August 2012.
- Special Performance for the Foreign Ministry of Bangkok, Thailand. December 2012.
- Produced, hosted, and performed at Fashion of the Opera charity event for Merit School of Music. October 2012.
- National Anthem for the Chicago Bulls at United Center. November 2015.
- National Anthem for the Chicago Cubs at Wrigley Field. September 2014.
- National Anthem for Citywide Rally honoring U.S. Champion Little League Team at Millennium Park - Pritzker Pavilion. August 2014.

=== The Three Sopranos ===
Founding member of Chicago-based ensemble "Très Belle", also known as "The Three Sopranos".

== Recordings ==
In January 2012, Buchheit released a debut album of 6 original songs entitled Mari Therese: All Yours. The first 2 tracks on the album were produced by Azica Records in Cleveland, Ohio. The remaining tracks were produced in Chicago. Instrumentation includes Buchheit on vocals and guitar, Joe Buchheit on keyboard, Anthony Sobun on bass, Juan Garcia-Spitz on guitar, Isaac Krantz-Perlman on percussion, Wesley Skinner on cello, and Victor Beyens on violin.

== Personal life ==
Buchheit has been a vegan since 2002 and a vegetarian since 1997.

== Honors ==
- Recipient of 2015 Humanitarian Excellence Award from Illinois Secretary of State Jesse White. May 2015.
- Winner of the LiPuma Family Memorial Scholarship from the Casa Italia Vocal Scholarship Foundation. November 2014.
- Invited to address the Illinois State Senate on the topic of Arts Education at the Illinois State Capitol Building. March 2013.
- Threw out the First Pitch at a Chicago Cubs Baseball Game at Wrigley Field. August 2014.
- Honorable Mention Award at the Franz Liszt International Vocal Competition in Los Angeles, CA. 2012.
- Recognized by the Chicago Tribune as a "Remarkable Woman". 2012.
- Received $5,000 grant from the Cleveland Foundation to support "Dream, Believe, Achieve!" Scholarship Program. 2010.
- Winner of the Potbelly's Singer-Songwriter Competition. 2010.

Awards and achievements
Preceded by Brittany Smith	Miss Illinois; 2014	Succeeded by Crystal Davis
