= Zula, Kentucky =

Unincorporated community in Kentucky, United States

Zula
- Unincorporated community
- Location within the state of Kentucky
- Coordinates: 36°46′02″N 84°58′46″W
- Country: United States
- State: Kentucky
- County: Wayne
- Elevation: 938 ft (286 m)
- Time zone: UTC-5 (Eastern (EST))
  - Summer (DST): UTC-4 (EDT)
- GNIS feature ID: 509429

Zula is an unincorporated community in Wayne County, Kentucky, United States.

== History ==
A post office called Zula was established in 1901, and remained in operation until it was discontinued in 1975. The community was named for Zula Frost.
