= Lois Delander =

Miss America winner

Lois E. Delander
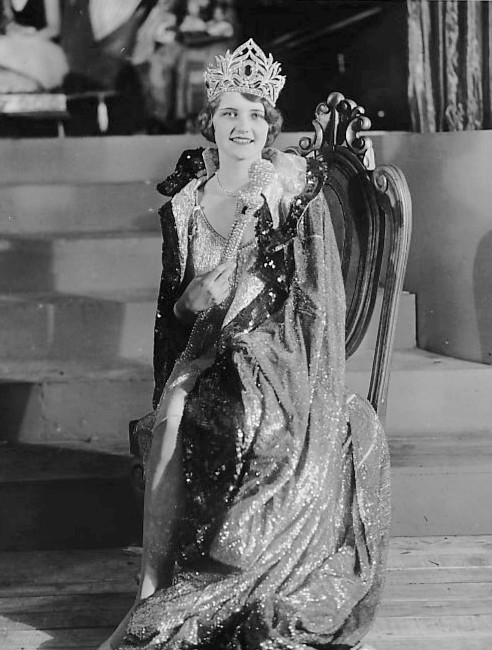
- Delander in 1927
- Born: Lois Eleanor Delander; March 14, 1911; Joliet, Illinois
- Died: January 23, 1985 (aged 73); Chicago, Illinois
- Title: Miss America 1927
- Predecessor: Norma Smallwood
- Successor: Marian Bergeron
- Spouse: Ralph Lang
- Children: 3

Lois Eleanor Delander (February 14, 1911 – January 23, 1985) was Miss America in 1927.

== Biography ==
Delander, a native of Joliet, Illinois and high school junior, aged 16, won the Miss America crown on her parents' twentieth wedding anniversary. Following the 1927 competition, the pageant would not held again until 1933.

She was one of the most famous models appearing in the Gerlach Barklow Co. art calendars. A pastel of Lois Delander wearing a white bathing suit was artist Adelaide Hiebel's most famous work.

== Personal life ==
She married Ralph Lang, a stockbroker, and lived in Evanston, Illinois with her three daughters, Diana, Linda, and Marsha. She died near Chicago in 1985.

Awards and achievements
Preceded by Norma Smallwood	Miss America; 1927	Succeeded by Marian Bergeron
