= Zula Kenyon =

American illustrator

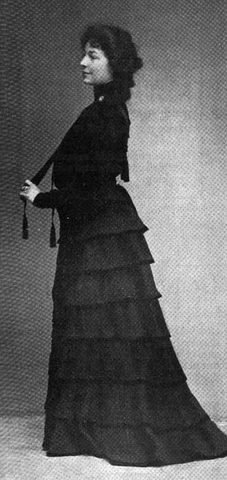
- Zula Kenyon, from a 1910 publication
- Born: June 5, 1873; Deansville, Wisconsin
- Died: June 23, 1947; La Mesa, California
- Occupation: Illustrator

Zula Kenyon (June 5, 1873 – June 23, 1947) was an American illustrator, best known for her pastel work for the Gerlach Barklow Co.

== Early life ==
Kenyon was born in Deansville, Wisconsin, the daughter of John Kenyon and Sarah Clark Kenyon. Her father was a clergyman; she moved to Chicago with her mother and sister by 1900. She trained as an artist at the Art Institute of Chicago.

== Career ==
Kenyon was exhibiting her work by 1896. She made hundreds of illustrations in pastel for the Gerlach Barklow Company of Joliet, Illinois. Her work, usually sentimental images of children, animals, flowers, and young women, was featured in their calendars, jigsaw puzzles, and other publications. The Spokesman and Harness World magazine declared that "Never has Miss Kenyon painted nobler animals or more winsome womanhood" than in Gerlach Barklow's "In the Land of the Blue Grass" calendar for 1920. Her most popular series, "The Song of the Bluebird", was made for the company's 1926 Bluebird calendar, and versions of the Bluebird series were published for decades afterward; it was the most commercially successful series published by Gerlach Barklow.

Works by Kenyon are still considered collectible, and a museum in Waterloo, Wisconsin had a display of Kenyon illustrations in 2014.

== Personal life ==
Kenyon traveled abroad with her sister in 1913. She was in a car accident in Chicago in 1914, as a passenger in a car that lost its roof in high winds. Before 1920 she moved to Arizona and then to Southern California for her health, living with her younger sister Haidee Kenyon. She died in La Mesa, California in 1947, aged 74 years.
