= Veena Goel =

American writer (born 1981)

Veena Goel Crownholm
- Born: Veena Michelle Goel; September 23, 1981 (age 45); Laguna Hills, California, U.S.
- Beauty pageant titleholder
- Title: Miss California 2004
- Hair color: Brown
- Eye color: Brown
- Major competition: Miss America

Veena Goel Crownholm (born September 23, 1981) is an American writer, motivational speaker, internet personality, blogger, actress, and beauty pageant titleholder from Laguna Hills, California. She was crowned Miss California 2004, placed fourth runner-up and won a preliminary talent award at Miss America 2005. In 2002, Goel graduated from UCLA with a bachelor's degree in Sociology. Since then, she has worked extensively in the non-profit industry specializing in special event fundraising and program development.

Awards and achievements
| Preceded by Nicole Lamarche | Miss California; 2004 | Succeeded by Dustin-Leigh Konzelman |
