= Jacquelynne Fontaine =

American opera singer

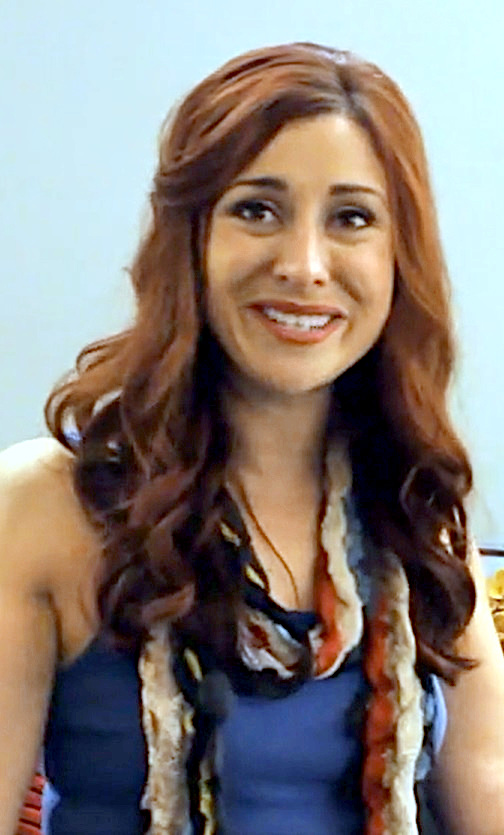
- Fontaine in 2014
- Born: Jacquelynne Noelle Fontaine; September 20, 1982 (age 43); Oxnard, California, U.S.
- Beauty pageant titleholder
- Hair color: Brown
- Eye color: Brown

Jacquelynne Noelle Fontaine (born September 20, 1982) is an American opera singer, actress, and beauty pageant titleholder. She held the title of Miss California 2006, finished in the top 10 and won a preliminary talent award at Miss America in 2007. She is known for her performance as Carlotta Giudicelli in the adaptation of The Phantom of the Opera by Andrew Lloyd Webber at the Academy of Music.

== Early life ==
Fontaine graduated from Oxnard High School. In 2004, she graduated from the California Lutheran University in Thousand Oaks with a bachelor's degree in music. Fontaine completed her master's degree in Vocal Arts from University of Southern California in 2008. She completed two years at the Thornton School of Music, and currently studies with David Jones in New York City. She is a member of the Actors Equity Association (AEA). She is represented for classical engagements by John Miller of Pinnacle Arts Management, and by Professional Artists for musical theater and stage engagements.

== Career ==
=== Pageant ===
Fontaine competed twice in Miss California. She first competed as Miss Ventura County and finished in the top ten. She competed again as Miss Santa Barbara County and won Miss California in 2006. She reached the top ten of Miss America in 2007 after performing Giacomo Puccini's "Vissi d'arte".

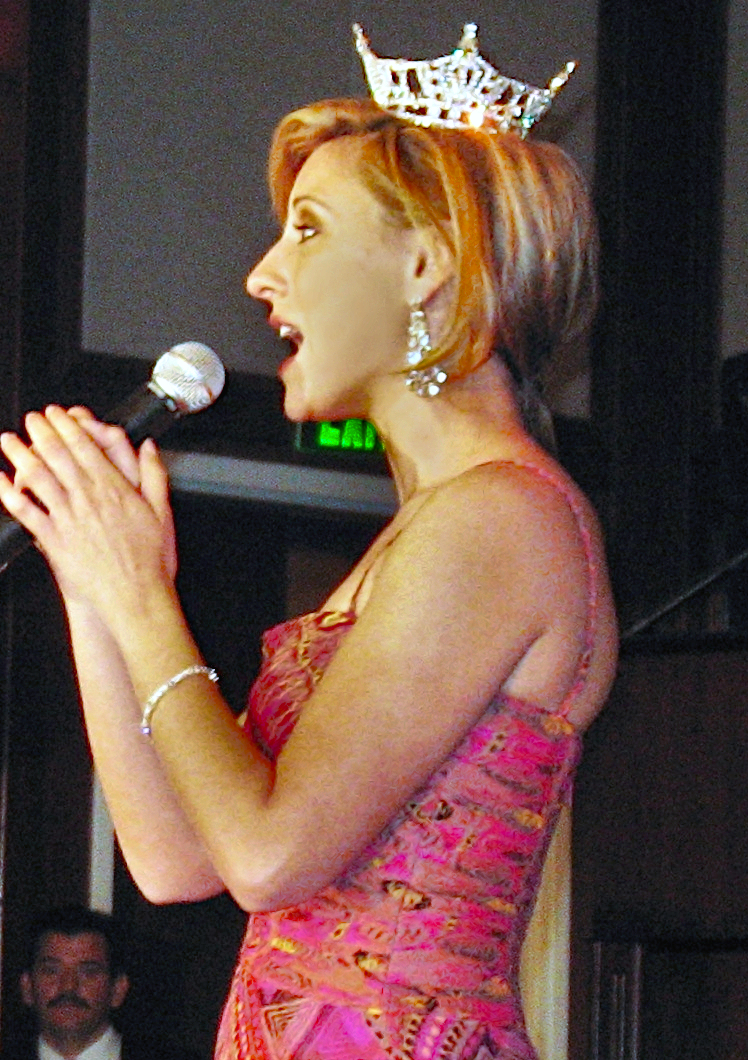
Miss Santa Barbara County 2006 Miss California 2006 in Miss America 2007 (Top 10)

=== Theatre ===
Fontaine starred as Carlotta Giudicelli in the new staging of The Phantom of the Opera by Andrew Lloyd Webber which started its tour of the United States. The Phantom of the Opera began its tour in December 2013. The Mercury New described her as formidable. The Fresno Bee praised her performance and described it as standout.

Her recent operatic lead roles include Violetta in La Traviata in Oregon in May 2011. She played Donna Anna and Donna Elvira in Don Giovanni in Viterbo, Italy. and Susanna in Le Nozze di Figaro in the Rogue Opera in Oregon. She played Pamina in The Magic Flute, and Ilia in Idomeneo with the USC Opera at the Thornton School of Music. She made her professional operetta debut performing Kathie in The Student Prince with the Pittsburgh CLO and was named a "charming and vivacious actress" in Talkin' Broadway. She played Countess Charlotte Magnum in A Little Night Music with the Indiana Repertory Theatre. The show ran from January 23, 2013, to February 17, 2013. She played the Ragazza in the world premiere of the musical A Room With a View at the Old Globe Theater in San Diego, and Anna in The King & I with Opera North. Her recital and orchestral highlights include Sunday's Live on KUSC at LACMA, Jacaranda Concert Series, Orchestra del Lazio in Rome, Italy, Marina del Rey Orchestra, Redlands Bowl, South Coast Levitra veterans cost Symphony, and the Cal Lutheran Distinguished Speakers Series.

=== Awards ===
She was semi-finalist in the International Competitzione del' Opera in Dresden in 2010 and was awarded the Loren Zachary Grand National Finalist in 2011. She won the Palm Springs Opera Guild First Place winner; Metropolitan Opera National Council Auditions Western regional finalist and district winner; Burbank Philharmonic Young Artist winner; Rio Hondo Symphony "Young Artist of the Year"; and the National Association of Teachers of Singing, Los Angeles, "Singer of the Year".

Awards and achievements
Preceded by Dustin-Leigh Konzelman	Miss California; 2006	Succeeded by Melissa Chaty
