= Lucille Lambert =

American model

- Born: Lucille Lambert; California, U.S.
- Beauty pageant titleholder
- Title: Miss California 1942
- Hair color: Blond
- Major competitions: Miss America 1942 (4th Runner-Up)

Lucille Lambert was an American beauty pageant contestant, Miss Hollywood and Miss California 1942. She is from Hollywood. She is alive as of 2008.

Awards and achievements
Preceded by Unknown	Miss Hollywood; 1942	Succeeded by Unknown
Preceded by Rosemary LaPlanche	Miss California; 1942	Succeeded by Jean Bartel
