= Brooke McLaurin =

American beauty pageant titleholder

- Born: Brooke Elizabeth McLaurin; June 13, 1981 (age 45); Fayetteville, North Carolina, U.S.
- Education: Fayetteville State University
- Spouse: Jeremy Autry (m. 2010)
- Beauty pageant titleholder
- Title: Miss North Carolina 2005
- Hair color: Brunette
- Eye color: Blue
- Major competition: Miss America 2006

Brooke Elizabeth McLaurin (born June 13, 1981) is an American beauty pageant titleholder from Eastover, North Carolina, who was named Miss North Carolina 2005.

== Biography ==
She won the title of Miss North Carolina on June 25, 2005, when she received her crown from outgoing titleholder Kirstin Elrod. At the age of 22, McLaurin was diagnosed with a brain tumor. After successful surgery to remove the tumor, she changed her platform to brain tumor awareness and research, and was able to raise $10,000 for brain tumor research. McLaurin is a graduate of Fayetteville State University. She accepted a position as a hostess on the Jewelry TV network and relocated to Knoxville, Tennessee in January 2015.

Awards and achievements
| Preceded by Kirstin Elrod | Miss North Carolina; 2005 | Succeeded by Elizabeth Horton |
