= Rancho Deluxe =

1975 film by Frank Perry

- Theatrical release poster
- Directed by: Frank Perry
- Written by: Thomas McGuane
- Produced by: Elliott Kastner
- Starring: Jeff Bridges; Sam Waterston; Elizabeth Ashley; Clifton James; Harry Dean Stanton; Slim Pickens; Charlene Dallas
- Cinematography: William A. Fraker
- Edited by: Sidney Katz
- Music by: Jimmy Buffett
- Production company: Elliott Kastner Productions
- Distributed by: United Artists
- Release date: March 14, 1975
- Running time: 93 min
- Country: United States
- Language: English

Rancho Deluxe is a 1975 neo-Western comedy film directed by Frank Perry. Jeff Bridges and Sam Waterston star as two cattle rustlers in modern-day Livingston, Montana, who plague a wealthy ranch owner, played by Clifton James.

The film also stars Harry Dean Stanton, Richard Bright, Elizabeth Ashley, Maggie Wellman, Patti D'Arbanville, and Slim Pickens as the aging detective Henry Beige hired to find the rustlers. Jimmy Buffett contributed the music for the soundtrack, and performed "Livingston Saturday Night" with alternate lyrics within the film in a scene set at a country and western bar. The script was by novelist Thomas McGuane.

== Plot ==
Jack McKee and Cecil Colson are a couple of young, restless rustlers. Jack has turned his back on his wealthy family and his wife Anna. Cecil is a Native American. Together, more out of boredom than anything else, they have begun rustling cattle, cutting them up with a chainsaw and paying bills with fresh meat in lieu of cash. Equally bored are wealthy Montana rancher John Brown and his wife, Cora. They once ran a beauty parlor in Schenectady, New York, but now they have bought up most of the land in this corner of Montana. Cora is so bored that she tries to catch the eye of her husband's dim ranch hands, Burt and Curt, but she can't seem to work up much interest on their part.

The rustling of his livestock lights a fire under Brown, who sends Burt and Curt up in a helicopter to try to catch the thieves in the act. Jack and Cecil continue to single out Brown's cattle, even kidnapping "Basehart of Bozeman Canyon", his US$50,000 prize bull (equivalent to $299,165 in 2025), for ransom. Brown decides to call upon Henry Beige, said to be the scourge of rustlers. A legendary stock detective who once served time on a prison farm for rustling, Henry appears to be a feeble old fool who doesn't seem to be interested in anything except watching TV and being waited on hand and foot by his beautiful niece, Laura, who is almost sickeningly sweet.

Jack and Cecil are feeling cocky, so much so that when Burt and Curt figure out that they must be the rustlers, Jack and Cecil bribe them into a scheme to steal a semi-truck full of John Brown's cattle. Curt has fallen head over heels in love with the luscious Laura, even though she still mistakenly calls him Burt. She is nowhere near as innocent as she seems, as she proves in a sexual encounter in the woods. Burt intends to use his rustling profits to take an expensive vacation in Mexico, but Curt has chosen to propose marriage to Laura.

Henry's seeming ineptitude and lack of interest in identifying the rustlers is infuriating to Brown, who angrily fires him. A distressed Laura explains to Curt that she needs to take care of her uncle and therefore will be leaving with him, unable to marry Curt. Curt decides to help Henry catch the rustlers instead. Henry proceeds to do that, making a show of it before the town's citizens. Burt and Curt are also arrested, Curt coming to realize that Laura's sweetness and love for him were all an act.

Henry comes to Brown to say goodbye, nonchalantly accepting his payment because he says he's in it simply for the sport. Brown can see now that Henry is shrewd, not doddering at all, and Laura is a sexy, all-business woman, not innocent in any way. Jack and Cecil end up sent to the Montana State Prison Ranch at Deer Lodge, presumably the same prison where Henry served time in his youth. They spend their days on horseback, seemingly no more or less bored than they had been before. The final scene shows the two rustlers riding under a sign reading "Rancho Deluxe".

== Cast ==
- Jeff Bridges as Jack McKee
- Sam Waterston as Cecil Colson
- Elizabeth Ashley as Cora Brown
- Clifton James as John Brown
- Slim Pickens as Henry Beige
- Charlene Dallas as Laura Beige
- Harry Dean Stanton as Curt
- Richard Bright as Burt
- Patti D'Arbanville as Betty Fargo
- Maggie Wellman as Mary Fargo
- Bert Conway as Wilbur Fargo
- Joe Spinell as Mr. Colson
- Richard McMurray as Mr. McKee
- Danna Hansen as Mrs. McKee
- Doria Cook as Anna McKee
- Helen Craig as Mrs. Castle
- Jimmy Buffett as Himself
- Jim Melin, Dwight Riley & Tim Schaeffer as The Orchestra

== Production ==
Principal photography began on April 29, 1974 in Livingston, Montana. Other locations including Paradise Valley, Montana where most of the valley sequences were filmed. The whole community of Livingston were also included for when the cast and crew were filming in town, including at a local bar named The Wrangler, The Holiday Inn motel, a popular local sporting goods store, individual houses and ranches in the area. For the final scene, the crew traveled to Deer Lodge, Montana to film the movie-ending sequence where Jack McKee (Jeff Bridges) and Cecil Colson (Sam Waterston) are on horses at the prison ranch with the sign that reads Rancho Deluxe. Filming lasted for two months and production wrapped in July 1974.

Bridges met his future wife, Susan Geston, while filming. She was working as a waitress at a ranch. The characters Jack and Cecil play Pong in a bar scene.

== Release ==
Rancho Deluxe was released in theatres on March 14, 1975.

== Reception ==
The film was described as a form of "parody Western" by critic Richard Eder in his Nov. 24, 1975 The New York Times review. "It is so cool that it is barely alive," he wrote of the film's general tone. Among the positive elements: "Slim Pickens for once has a strongly written comic role. He plays it with great effect, and Charlene Dallas, as his sluttish assistant, is almost as good." Roger Ebert of the Chicago Sun-Times gave Rancho Deluxe 1.5 out of four stars. He wrote: "I don't know how this movie went so disastrously wrong, but it did."

On Rotten Tomatoes, Rancho Deluxe holds a rating of 61% from 67 reviews. The consensus summarizes: "While its script may be a bit too self-knowing and aimless at times, Rancho Deluxe offers a breezy twist on the Western that's buoyed by effortlessly funny performances from Jeff Bridges and Sam Waterston."

Time Out named Rancho Deluxe one of the 50 greatest western movies ranking it at 46.

== See also ==
- Rancho Deluxe (soundtrack)
