= Arianna Afsar =

American singer and composer

- Born: Arianna Ayesha Afsar; October 22, 1991 (age 35); San Diego, California, U.S.
- Education: University of California, Los Angeles (BA)
- Occupations: singer; composer; beauty queen; activist; actress
- Notable work: Hamilton (2016); Jeannette: The Musical (2019); Allegory (2019)
- Website: www.ariannaafsar.com

Arianna Ayesha Afsar (born October 22, 1991) is an American singer, composer, beauty queen, and activist best known for her starring role in Hamilton, as the songwriter of the musical Jeannette, and as a top contestant on American Idol.

== Early life and education ==
Afsar is from San Diego. Her father is from Bangladesh and her mother is of German origin. She attended Westview High School where she opened Adopt-a-Grandfriend in 2005, to fight loneliness of senior citizens. After graduating Westview in 2009, she attended the University of California, Los Angeles.

== Career ==
=== Pageant ===
Afsar won the Miss America's Outstanding Teen title for California in 2005 and represented California in the inaugural Miss America's Outstanding Teen pageant in Orlando, Florida in August 2005. As the youngest contestant in the competition, she won a preliminary talent award and placed first runner-up.

She was the winner of Miss San Diego County in 2010.

In 2010 Afsar competed in the Miss California pageant for the first time and won the Miss California 2010 title. She competed in the Miss America 2011 pageant in January 2011 and placed in top 10.

=== American Idol ===
In 2009, Afsar was a contestant on American Idol 8. She auditioned in Phoenix and sang "Put Your Records On" by Corinne Bailey Rae. She was one of the final 36 contestants. Afsar progressed to the live semi-finals but failed to make it through her group and was not selected to compete for a wildcard by the judges.

=== Theatre ===
In 2001 she appeared in a production of Dr. Seuss' How the Grinch Stole Christmas! The Musical as Cindy Lou Who.

It was announced on July 13, 2016, that Afsar would portray the role of Elizabeth Schuyler Hamilton in the Chicago production of Hamilton beginning performances in late September 2016. Afsar left the Chicago production on March 25, 2018, but briefly returned to the role for the 2nd National Tour's stop at Segerstrom Center for the Arts for the weekend of May 19, 2018.

Afsar wrote the music and lyrics to the musical We Won't Sleep (formerly Jeannette) with a book by playwright Lauren Gunderson. The musical is about U.S. Rep. Jeannette Rankin, the first woman elected to Congress. Under the title Jeannette, it was part of the 2019 summer series at the National Music Theater Conference at the Eugene O'Neill Theater Center in Connecticut. We Won't Sleep is scheduled to have its world premiere at the Tony Award-winning Signature Theatre in Arlington, Virginia in 2022.

=== Politics and activism ===
Afsar is also a women's rights activist. She is on the board of the ACLU of Illinois Next Gen. She spoke at the youth reception for the American Civil Liberties Union national convention. She is an avid supporter and vocal advocate for Planned Parenthood, United State of Women, and the Women's March. Afsar opened for Michelle Obama at the United State of Women at the Shrine Auditorium.

=== Other ===
Afsar played the role of "Ellie" in the direct-to-video science fiction action film Martian Land.

== Filmography ==
=== Film ===
Year	Title	Role	Notes
2014	Mauj Mastiyan (Taste of Love)	Dolly	
2015	Martian Land	Ellie	Direct-to-video
2018	Canal Street	Kathy	
2022	Wedding Season	Priya	

=== Television ===
Year	Title	Role	Notes
2009	American Idol	Herself	4 episodes
2014	Unusual Suspects	Deanna Grimes	Episode: "Blood in the Water"
2014	OMG! EMT!	Brianne	Episode: "Surprise Attacks"
2014	Tattoo Nightmares	Elizabeth	Episode: "Broke and Branded"
2015	My Haunted House	Carrie	Episode: "Summer Rental & Dark Room"

Awards and achievements
Preceded by Kristy Cavinder	Miss California; 2010	Succeeded by Noelle Freeman
Preceded by Elizabeth & Isabella Tang	Miss California's Outstanding Teen; 2005	Succeeded by Summer Clark
