= Nicole Lamarche =

American minister (born 1978)

- Born: 1978 (age 47–48); San Francisco, California, U.S.
- Other name: Miss California 2003
- Years active: 2003

Nicole Lamarche (born 1978) is an ordained minister in the United Church of Christ (UCC) and a beauty pageant titleholder who was crowned Miss California 2003. Competing in the Miss San Francisco Pageant in 2003, she won the title and went on to win Miss California 2003 and became the Fourth Runner Up to the title of Miss America 2004. She was the swimsuit winner and although she decided to wear high heels during this segment of the competition it was erroneously reported by an ESPN columnist that she competed barefoot. This is most likely due to pictures of her competing in the Miss California swimsuit segment not wearing high heels, as the contestants normally do. She earned over $26,000 in scholarships.

She earned an MA in theology from the Graduate Theological Union in Berkeley, California, and a Master of Divinity from the Pacific School of Religion.

Lamarche spoke publicly about Miss California USA Carrie Prejean's controversial answer regarding gay marriage. Lamarche was featured on Larry King Live to discuss the topic.

Lamarche served as pastor for the Cotuit Federated Church on Cape Cod from 2007 until 2010. She subsequently relocated to Northern California, where she founded a new UCC congregation, the Silicon Valley Progressive Faith Community, in San Jose, now called Urban Sanctuary. She served as the congregation's Founding Pastor until 2018. In 2019 she became minister of Community UCC in Boulder, Colorado.

In 2008, Lamarche married Jeremy Nickel, whom she had met in divinity school. In July, 2011, the couple had their first child, a baby daughter.

Awards and achievements
Preceded by Jennifer Glover	Miss California; 2003	Succeeded by Veena Goel
