= Elizabeth Horton =

American beauty contestant and meteorologist

- Born: Elizabeth Leigh Horton; October 3, 1984 (age 42); High Point, North Carolina
- Education: Johns Hopkins University
- Beauty pageant titleholder
- Title: Miss Carolina Coast 2006; Miss North Carolina 2006
- Hair color: Blonde
- Eye color: Blue
- Major competition: Miss America 2007

Elizabeth Leigh Horton (born October 3, 1984), sometimes known as Liz Horton, was Miss North Carolina 2006 and is now a freelance meteorologist at CBS 4 WFOR-TV in Miami, Florida.

== Education ==
Horton is a 2002 graduate of Westchester Country Day School in High Point, North Carolina. She graduated from Mississippi State University in 2014, earning a Bachelor in Geosciences degree with a concentration in Meteorology. Prior to studying at MSU, she attended the Carolina School of Broadcasting, and obtained two degrees from the Peabody Institute of Johns Hopkins University: a Bachelor's of Music with a Vocal Performance concentration, and a Bachelor's of Music Education.

== Career ==
Horton got her start in the news business as an intern in the newsroom at WBTV.

She announced on November 16, 2016 that she would be freelancing for CBS 4 in Miami, Florida.

She joined ABC-11 in Durham, North Carolina in November 2013. She forecasted the weather on weekend evenings alongside Joel Brown and Heather Waliga. She also reported on weather and community events during the week. She left the station in October 2016 announcing that she was moving to Miami, Florida to spend more time with her family.

She joined Good Day Orlando on Fox 35 News in October 2011. She then worked as a full-time traffic reporter and weather anchor. She announced on Facebook that she would be leaving Fox 35 Orlando and taking a position in her home state of North Carolina.

In January, 2010 Horton was hired as a full-time traffic reporter for WBTV News This Morning, alongside John Carter, Christine Nelson, and Al Conklin. Horton also reported for the "On the Road" series.

== Pageantry ==
Horton was crowned Miss North Carolina 2006, while representing the Carolina coast. As Miss North Carolina, she devoted much of her time to working with the Autism Association of America, promoting her platform issue of autism awareness. After working as a therapist for an autistic child through Autism Outreach, Inc., Horton chose her platform in an effort to broaden public knowledge of autism and to secure funds for research.

Not only did she serve as a goodwill ambassador as Miss North Carolina 2006, she also represented the Tarheel State at the 2007 Miss America Scholarship Pageant.

Awards and achievements
Preceded by Brooke McLaurin	Miss North Carolina; 2006	Succeeded by Jessica Jacobs
