= Wendy Berry Mendes =

Wendy Berry
- Born: Wendy Berry
- Education: California State University, Long Beach; University of California, Santa Barbara; University of California, San Francisco
- Occupation: Professor
- Beauty pageant titleholder
- Title: Miss Centinela Valley 1989; Miss California 1989
- Major competition: Miss America 1990

Wendy Berry Mendes is the Chris Argyris Professor of Psychology at Yale University. She was previously the Sarlo/Ekman Professor of Emotion at University of California, San Francisco, United States and prior to that position was the John L. Loeb Associate Professor of Social Sciences at Harvard University. Her expertise is in the area of emotion, intergroup relationships, stigma and psychophysiology. At Yale she is the founder and director of the Emotion, Health, and Psychophysiology Lab in the Department of Psychology.

== Education ==
Mendes received her bachelor's and master's degrees from California State University, Long Beach. She then received her Ph.D. in psychology from the University of California, Santa Barbara in 2003 and for two years she was a post-doctoral scholar at the University of California, San Francisco.

== Employment and publications ==
Mendes joined the faculty of Harvard in 2004 as an assistant professor of psychology and was promoted to associate professor in 2008. She was a core faculty member of the Robert Wood Johnson Health and Society Scholars program which is run by the Harvard School of Public Health, and in 2010 she moved to UC San Francisco. At UCSF she was the Director of the Health Psychology Program and Deputy Vice Chair of Psychiatry. In the fall of 2023, she started her current position at Yale University in the Psychology Department.

Mendes co-wrote the book Social Psychophysiology for Social and Personality Psychology (Blascovich, Mendes, Vanman & Dickerson, 2011). She co-edited the Handbook of Social Psychology, 6th edition with Daniel T. Gilbert, Susan Fiske, and Eli Finkel, which was the first edition to be open-access. She has published articles in Journal of Personality and Social Psychology, Psychological Science, Psychosomatic Medicine (journal), Emotion (journal), American Journal of Public Health, Clinical Psychological Science, Social Psychological and Personality Science and many other scholarly peer-review journals. Her research questions sit at the intersection of social, personality, and biological psychology and primarily concern embodiment - how emotions, thoughts, and intentions are experienced in the body and how bodily responses shape and influence thoughts, behavior and emotions (see Blascovich & Mendes, 2010). Some current research areas include coping with stigma and discrimination, dyadic intergroup interactions, affect contagion, mind-body relations across the life course, influence of emotional labeling on emotional experience

== Awards ==
In 2008 Mendes won the Gordon Allport prize for best paper on intergroup relations from SPSSI, in 2009 she won the Sage Young Scholar Award awarded by the Society for Personality and Social Psychology, in 2011 she won the Janet Taylor Spence award from APS for early transformative careers awarded by the Association for Psychological Science, in 2020 she was awarded the Career Trajectory Award by the Society for Experimental Social Psychology, and for five consecutive years (2006–2010) she was named one of Harvard undergraduates favorite Professors.

== Personal life ==
Mendes (then Wendy Berry) was Miss California in 1989. She is married to Michael Mendes and they have one daughter, Blair.

Awards and achievements
Preceded by Marlise Ricardos	Miss California; 1989	Succeeded by Maria Ostapiej
