= Rita Ng =

American beauty pageant titleholder and cardiologist

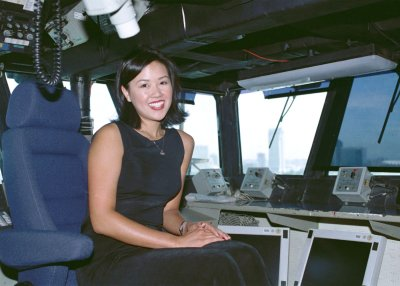
- Born: Rita Ng; Tracy, California, U.S.
- Beauty pageant titleholder
- Title: Miss California 2000
- Hair color: brown
- Eye color: brown
- Major competition: Miss America 2001

Rita Ng (Chinese: 伍思茵; pinyin: Wǔ Sīyīn; born 1978) from Tracy, California is an American beauty pageant titleholder who was crowned Miss California 2000 and is currently a practicing cardiologist. Ng was the first person of Asian descent to be crowned Miss California.

Ng won a preliminary talent award as a concert pianist and placed second runner up at Miss America 2001. She received over $50,000 in scholarships by competing in the Miss America Organization. As Miss California, she traveled to the French Riviera and Africa to promote children's health and welfare.

== Education ==
Ng graduated as Valedictorian of Tracy High School in 1996. She was captain of the varsity tennis team, International Baccalaureate Diploma recipient, and class president for four years.

Ng completed her undergraduate studies at Stanford University, where she graduated Phi Beta Kappa with a 3.99 GPA, earning a degree in Human Biology with Honors. She was awarded the Stanford Dinkelspiel Award, which recognizes two outstanding graduating seniors for their commitment to improving student life and education. Ng's interest in international health began at Stanford where her thesis work focused on health care access in third world countries for which she was awarded the prestigious Firestone Medal given to the top undergraduate honors thesis and her research work has been published in multiple scientific journals.

She earned her medical degree from the University of California at San Francisco Medical School, Internal Medicine Residency at UCSF, and cardiology fellowship at Cedars-Sinai Medical Center. Ng further received the distinction of being named Miss California and was second runner-up at the Miss America Pageant in 2001.

== Career ==
Ng served at the Cedars-Sinai Medical Center Heart Institute in Beverly Hills, California as Chief Fellow in Cardiovascular Medicine. She was named the Elliot Corday "Outstanding Fellow of the Year". Dr. Ng is the Chief of Cardiology for Kaiser Permanente East Bay, assistant clinical professor of medicine for UCSF, and serves on The Permanente Medical Group Board of Directors - the largest physician group in the country. She has received numerous medical teaching awards. She has served on the prestigious judges panel for the Miss California Pageant and the Miss Alabama Pageant.

In 2011, Ng started working in the Cardiology Department at Kaiser Permanente in Richmond, California.

== Awards ==
In addition to winning the National Talent Award and the Top Interview award, she was the first Asian-American Miss California in the 80-year history of the pageant. Ng has received numerous national and international accolades - California's Youth Volunteer of the Year, USA Today Newspaper named her to the "First All-American Academic Team," Glamour Magazine featured her as one of the "Top 10 College Women in America," and the Chinese World Journal named her as one of the "Ten Most Influential Asian-Americans" of the year. She has appeared in Time Magazine, Glamour Magazine, Cosmopolitan Magazine, US Weekly, and many others and was the featured model for Procter & Gamble Global Beauty Campaign including Covergirl, Max Factor, and Oil of Olay cosmetics. She serves on numerous boards and foundations such as the Coca-Cola Scholars Foundation National Selection Committee and the Boys and Girls Club Organization. As chairwoman for many philanthropic organizations and a gifted pianist, Ng has traveled extensively around the nation and world giving keynote addresses and piano concerts, helping to raise millions of dollars for her causes around the nation and world.

== Personal life ==
On July 6, 2013, Dr. Ng married Carson Taylor Lawall, a Neurologist and fellow graduate of UCSF School of Medicine. They have two sons Logan and Lucas.

Awards and achievements
Preceded by MaryAnne Sapio	Miss California; 2000	Succeeded by Stephanie Baldwin
