= Charlene Dallas =

American beauty queen

Charlene Diane Dallas
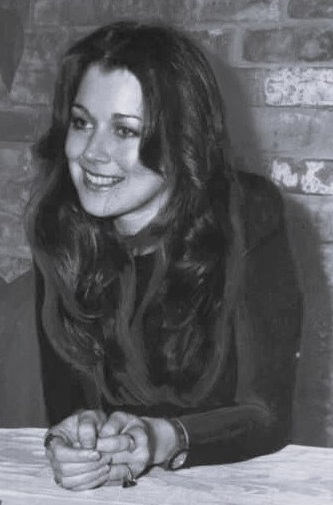
- Dallas in 1975
- Education: California College of Arts and Crafts
- Height: 5 ft 6 in (1.68 m)
- Beauty pageant titleholder
- Title: Miss California (1966)
- Hair color: Brown
- Major competition: Miss America 1967

Charlene Diane Dallas (born April 13, 1947) is a former beauty queen contestant who was Miss California for 1966, as well as first runner-up to Miss America for 1967.

== Early life and education ==
Dallas is from Danville in Contra Costa County, California. She studied at California College of Arts and Crafts.

== Pageantry career ==
In 1966, Dallas competed as Miss Contra Costa County for the Miss California competition. While she placed as first runner-up, the original winner Donna Danzer returned the title within an hour of winning, and Dallas was named the winner instead.

At the Miss America 1967 competition, hosted in September 1966, she won a talent award for playing piano and a swimsuit award. She finished first runner-up overall.

== Acting career ==
She had a number of minor acting roles, including one as Laura Beige in the 1975 film Rancho Deluxe. She played Rita Lange In the "Dirge for a Dead Dachshund" episode of The Eddie Capra Mysteries in 1978, and had second billing in the 1989 film Criminal Act, playing Sharon Fields.

== Filmography ==
- Cops and Robbers (1973)
- Rancho Deluxe (1975)
- The Great Bank Hoax (1978)
- Criminal Act (1989)

Awards and achievements
Preceded by Sandra Lynne Becker	Miss California; 1966	Succeeded by Karen Pursell
