= Kandice Pelletier =

American beauty queen (born 1981)

- Born: Kandice Pelletier; November 21, 1981 (age 45); Lubbock, Texas, U.S.
- Education: North Cobb High School
- Alma mater: New York University
- Height: 5 ft 9 in (1.75 m)
- Children: 4
- Beauty pageant titleholder
- Title: National Sweetheart 2003, Miss New York 2005
- No. of films: Contestant on The Amazing Race 10 and The Amazing Race: All-Stars
- Hair color: Blonde
- Eye color: Blue
- Major competition: Miss America 2006

Kandice Pelletier Halpin (born November 21, 1981) is an American beauty queen, swimwear designer, and dancer from Marietta, Georgia. She competed in the Miss America pageant and on two seasons of the reality television show The Amazing Race.

== Education ==
Pelletier graduated with honors from North Cobb High School in 2000 and went on to attempt a major in communications at Kennesaw State University. Though she never graduated KSU she moved to New York City to pursue a dance career and earned a degree in entertainment communications at New York University.

== Career ==
=== Performing arts ===
While in New York, Pelletier worked as a Radio City Music Hall Rockette and was immortalized into the Rockette wax figure at Madame Tussauds Time's Square location. Pelletier later appeared in the movie-musical remake of The Producers as a member of the dancing chorus ("a girl with the pearls") . Kandice appeared as the 'coach' on MTV's reality television series MADE in the episode entitled "Beauty Queen". It was episode 23 of season nine of the program.

=== Pageantry ===
Pelletier competed in her first Miss America state pageant in 2002 when she was a quarter-finalist in the Miss Georgia pageant as Miss Cobb County. She returned as Miss Coastal Georgia the following year and placed first runner-up. Representing Georgia, Pelletier went on to win the National Sweetheart pageant for Miss America state runners-up in 2003.

After moving to New York to attend New York University, Pelletier competed as Miss Manhattan in the Miss New York pageant and placed first runner-up to Christina Ellington, who she had competed against at National Sweetheart. The following year she won the Miss New York 2005 title, after winning the Miss Greater New York City local pageant. In 2005, Pelletier was also a double state preliminary winner, with awards for swimsuit and talent.

Pelletier's sister Kendra Pelletier is also involved in pageantry. She placed in the top fifteen at the Miss Georgia USA 2007 pageant won by Brittany Swann and second runner-up in the Miss Capital City 2007 pageant in the Miss Georgia system. She also competed in the 2007 Miss Georgia Pageant as Miss Southern Rivers where she was a top 10 finalist.

=== The Amazing Race ===
She appeared on Season 10 with race partner Dustin, who competed at Miss America 2006 as Miss California. After traveling through Asia, Africa and Europe the pair won two legs and ultimately finished in fourth place. They also competed in All-Stars season after traveling through South America, Africa, Poland, Malaysia, Hong Kong, Guam, Hawaii and their final destination in San Francisco, the pair won four legs before finishing in second place.

=== Vanity Fair ===
Pelletier appeared alongside James Gandolfini on the April 2007 cover of Vanity Fair shot by Annie Leibovitz.

=== Swimwear ===
In 2011, Pelletier started a swimwear line, Kandice Pelletier Swimwear, focused on providing swimsuits to pageant contestants. The company previously sponsored over 50 state pageants each year in the Miss America and Miss USA systems. The company also served as the official swimwear of the Miss USA 2014 competition, the Miss Teen USA 2014 competition, and the Miss Teen USA 2013 competition. On June 5, 2018, the Miss America competition announced that they would no longer hold a swimsuit competition. Sometime between June 13, 2018 and August 24, 2018, the Kandice Pelletier Swimwear website went offline, and as of 2023, the brand remains inactive.

== Personal life ==
Pelletier married Jim Halpin, Jr. in 2018 and changed her surname to Halpin. She currently lives in New York City with her husband and two adopted children. She gave birth to a daughter named Collette Elizabeth Halpin on November 5, 2022 and a son named Christian Thomas Halpin on April 14, 2026.

Preceded by Christina Ellington	Miss New York; 2005	Succeeded by Bethlene Pancoast
Preceded by Madonna Emond	National Sweetheart; 2003	Succeeded by Monica Pang
