= Ann Simonton =

American activist and model

Ann J. Simonton (born 1952) an American writer, lecturer, media activist, and former fashion model. She founded and coordinated the non-profit group "Media Watch", which challenged perceived racism, sexism, and violence in the media through education and action. She currently resides in Santa Cruz, California and is a landlord.

== Biography ==
Simonton began as a fashion model in Los Angeles and New York City in the early 1970s, working for a period of time at Ford modeling agency. On June 24, 1971, she was gang raped at knifepoint in Morningside Park on her way to a modeling assignment. According to Simonton, this event was a key motivation for partaking in activism to help end sexual assaults on women.

External image
- Simonton's Sports Illustrated Swimsuit Issue cover from January 28, 1974

Simonton became a feminist activist. In the 1980s, she and Nikki Craft led the "Myth California" protests, a series of counter-pageants which accused the Miss California pageant of contributing to "the objectification of women and the glorification of the beauty myth". Simonton wore various meat outfits in these protests: one of baloney in 1982, skirt steak in 1985, and turkey slices in 1987. In 1987 she shaved her head in front of the pageant venue in San Diego in protest of the "racist attitudes" exhibited by the pageant. The protests were considered partially responsible for the Miss California pageant relocating from Santa Cruz to San Diego, California, according to Simonton. Simonton contributed one chapter to Not for sale: feminists resisting prostitution and pornography, an anthology by feminist activists, published by Spinifex Press. In 1989, Simonton received the Humanist Heroine Award from the American Humanist Association.

Simonton contributes to local political and cultural discussions in Santa Cruz, California. She served on the Commission for the Prevention of Violence Against Women in the City Manager's Office of the City of Santa Cruz from 2018-2024. In 2022, she was the Vice Chair of the Commission.
