= Miss California =

Beauty pageant competition

- Formation: 1924
- Type: Scholarship pageant
- Headquarters: Fresno
- Location: California
- Members: Miss America
- Official language: English
- Key people: Adam Smith, State Director
- Website: Official website

The Miss California competition selects the representative for the state of California in the Miss America competition. Six women have gone on to win Miss America (but none since 1983).

The pageant began in Santa Cruz in 1924 and was held there in 1925. During the years 1926 through 1946 in years when the Miss California pageant was held, the competition was primarily in San Francisco and Venice, California. In 1947, it returned to Santa Cruz and was held there annually until 1985, after which it moved to San Diego in response to years of protests and a "Myth California" counter pageant organized by local feminist activists led by Ann Simonton and Nikki Craft.

The pageant was held in Visalia, California from 2023‒2025. On January 9, 2026, the Miss California Organization announced that the Miss California competition will return to Fresno, California, at the Saroyan Theatre, where the pageant was held from 1994‒2022.

Sharlize True Trujillo of Los Angeles was crowned Miss California on June 20, 2026, at the William Saroyan Theatre in Fresno, California. She competed for the title of Miss America 2027 and placed 3rd runner-up on September 6, 2026, in West Palm Beach, Florida.

== Gallery of past titleholders ==
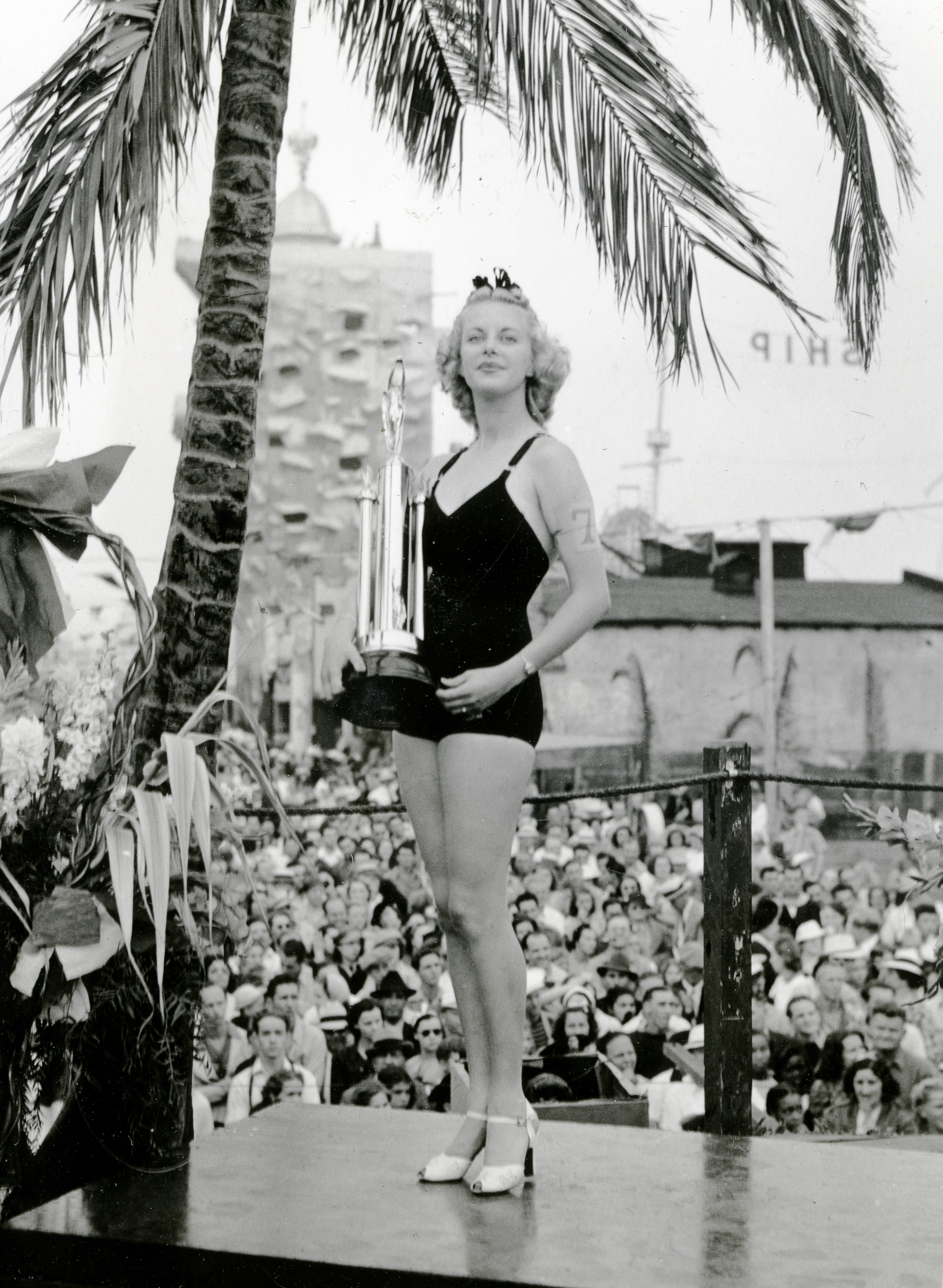
Rosemary LaPlanche,
Miss California 1940 and 1941 and Miss America 1941 in 1940

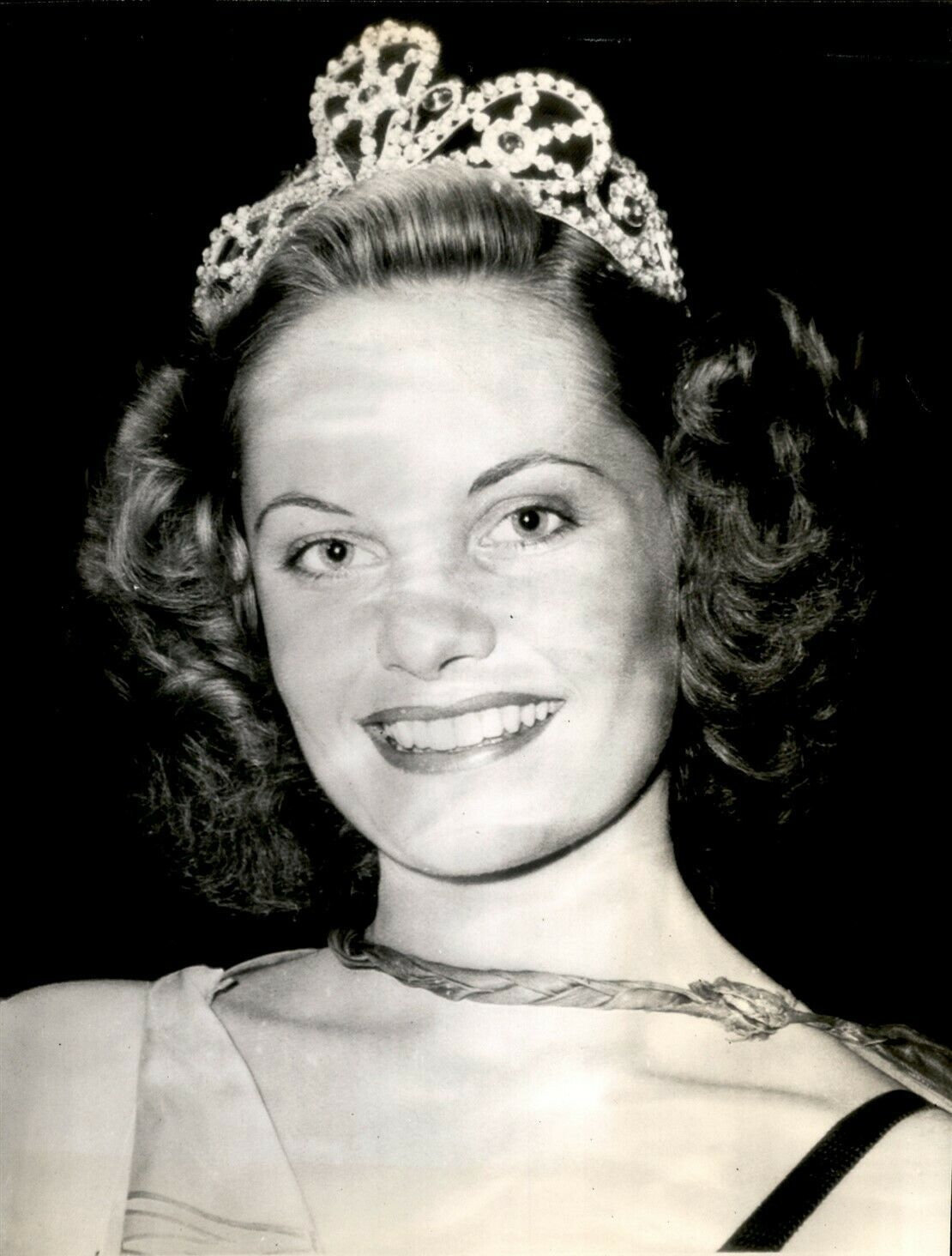
Jean Bartel,
Miss California 1943 and Miss America 1943

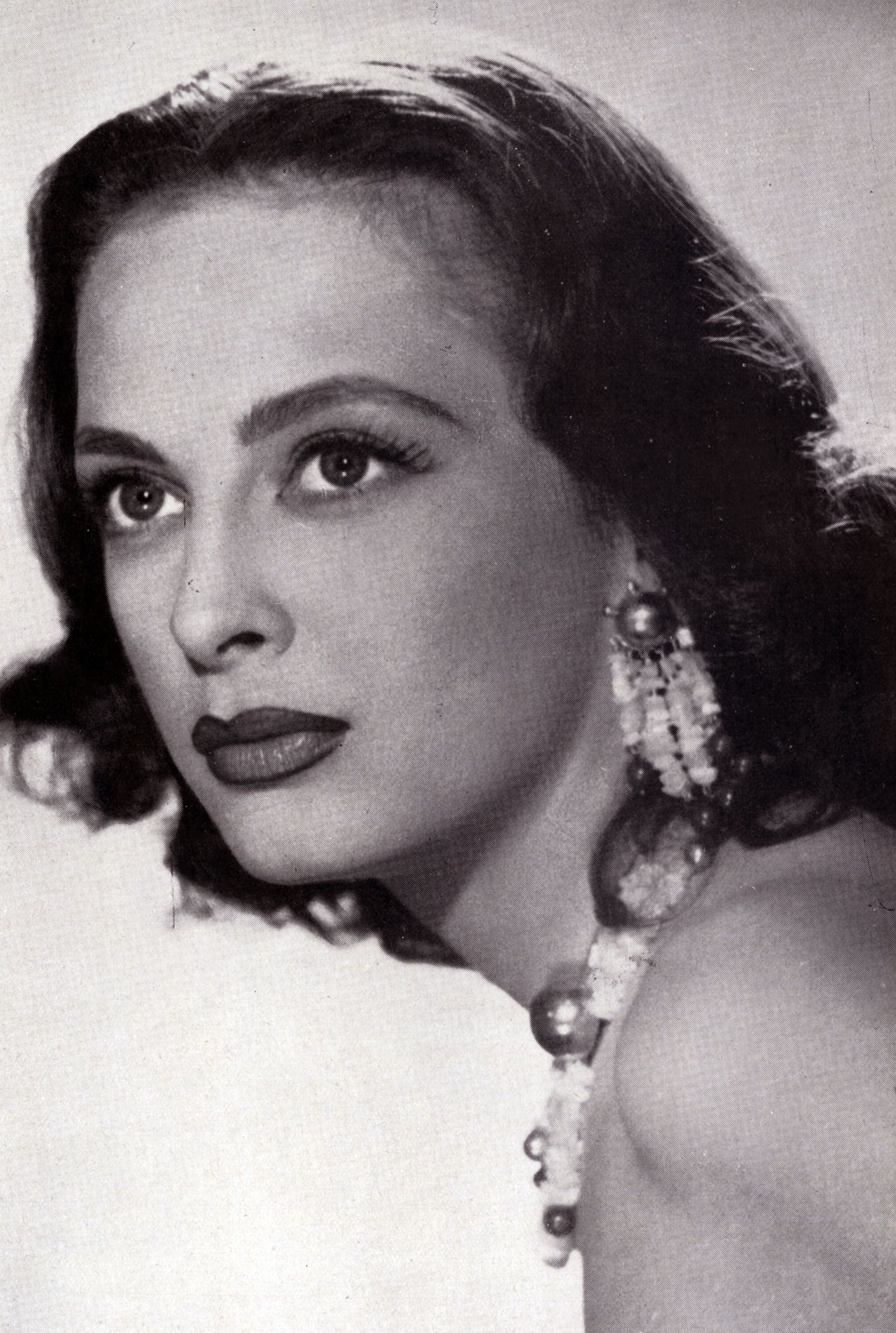
Marilyn Buferd,
Miss California 1946 and Miss America 1946 in 1953

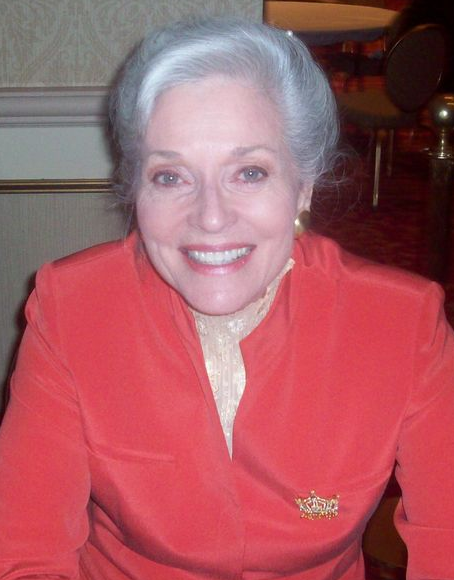
Lee Meriwether,
Miss California 1954 and Miss America 1955 in 2008

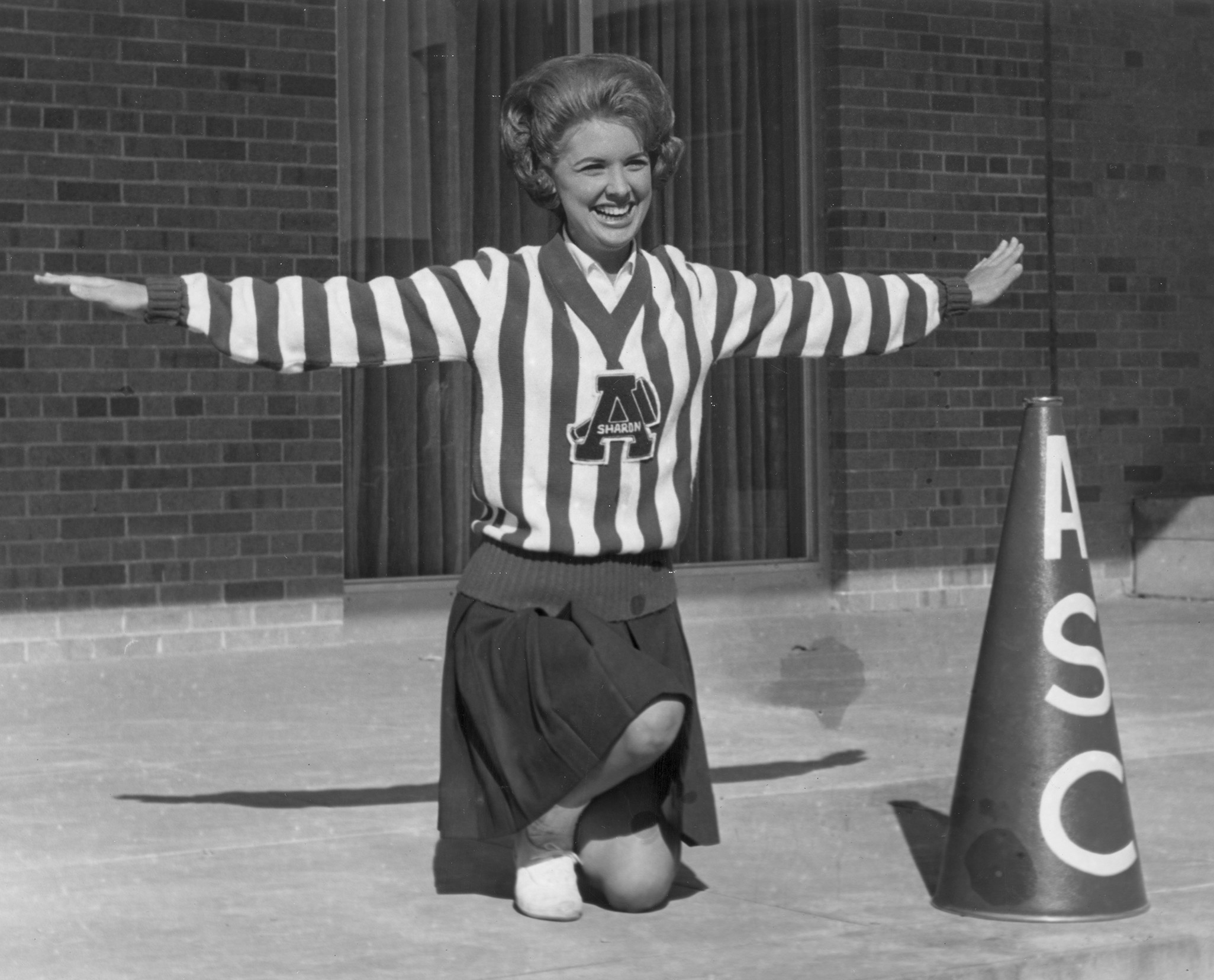
Sharon Terrill,
Miss California 1968, at Arlington State College in Texas in 1965

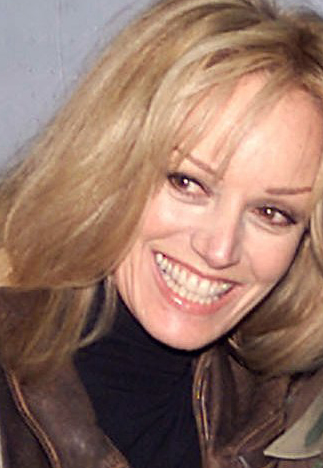
Susan Anton,
Miss California 1969 in 2001

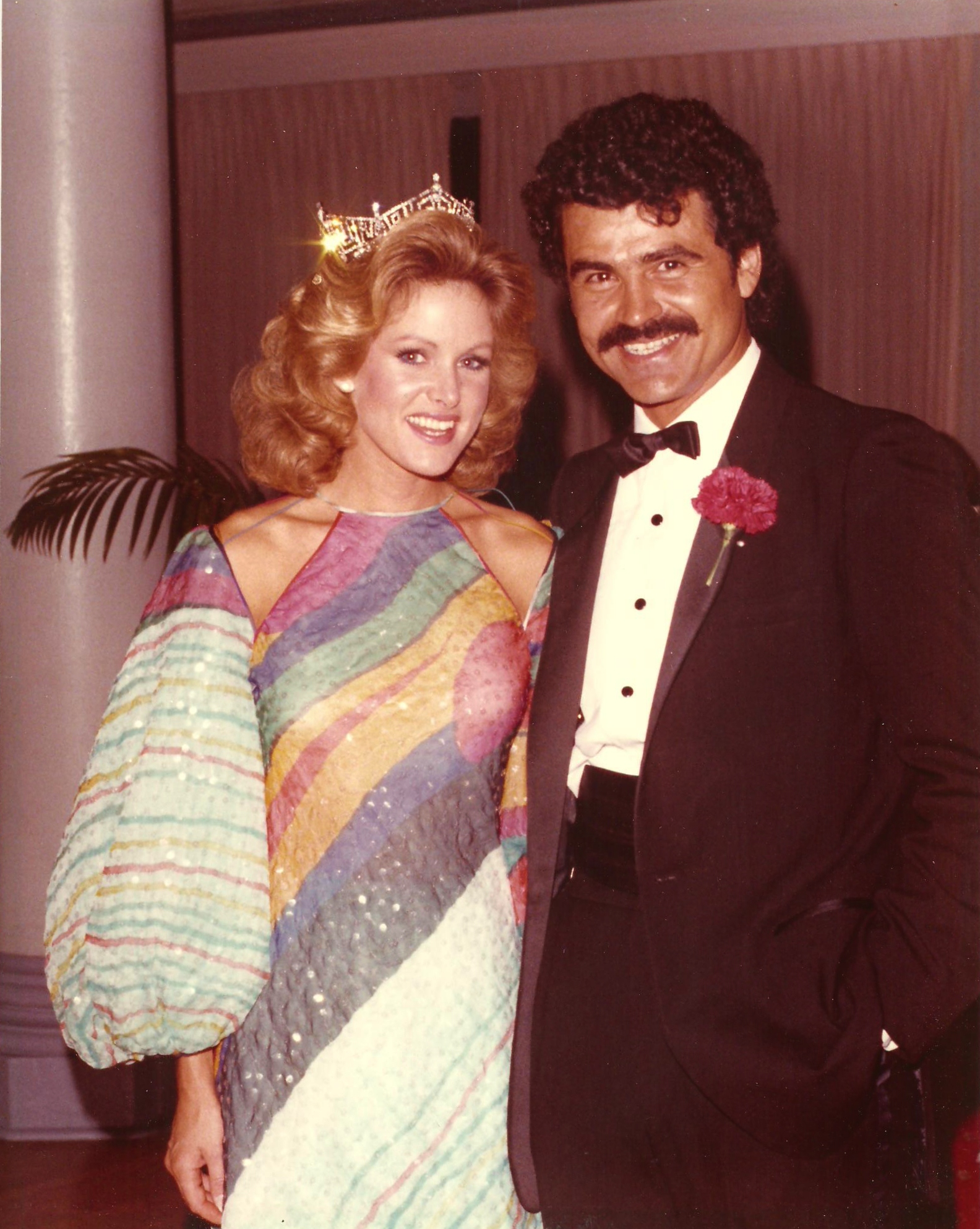
Debra Maffett,
Miss California 1982 and Miss America 1983 with Ronald Letterman

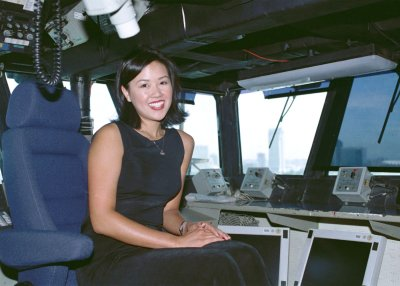
Rita Ng,
Miss California 2000

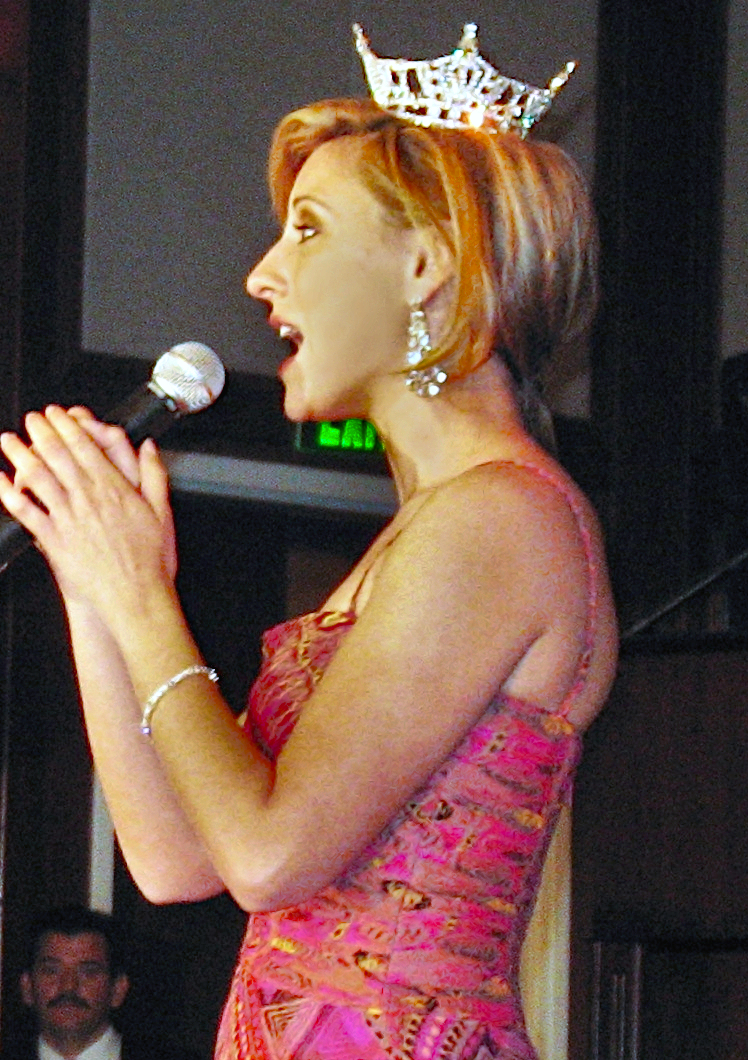
Jacquelynne Fontaine,
Miss California 2006

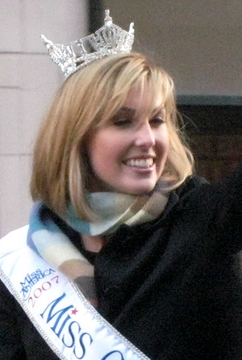
Melissa Chaty,
Miss California 2007

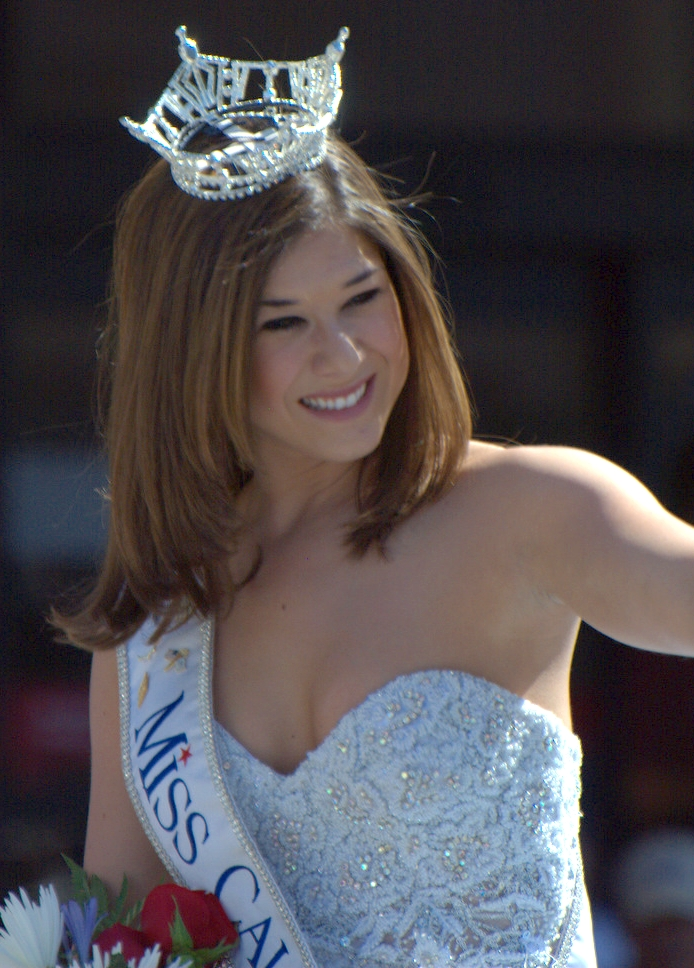
Kristy Cavinder,
Miss California 2009

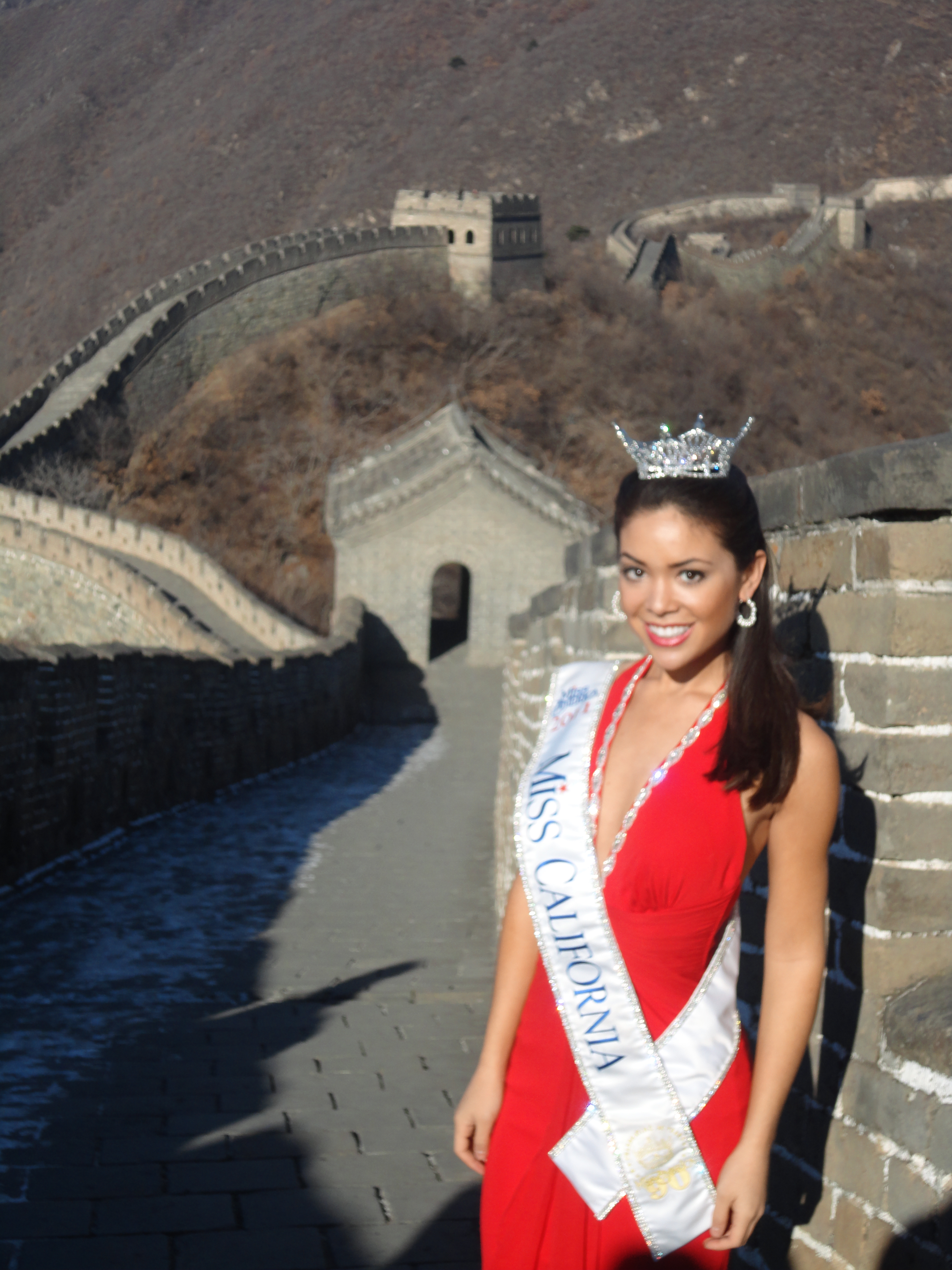
Noelle Freeman,
Miss California 2011, at the Great Wall of China

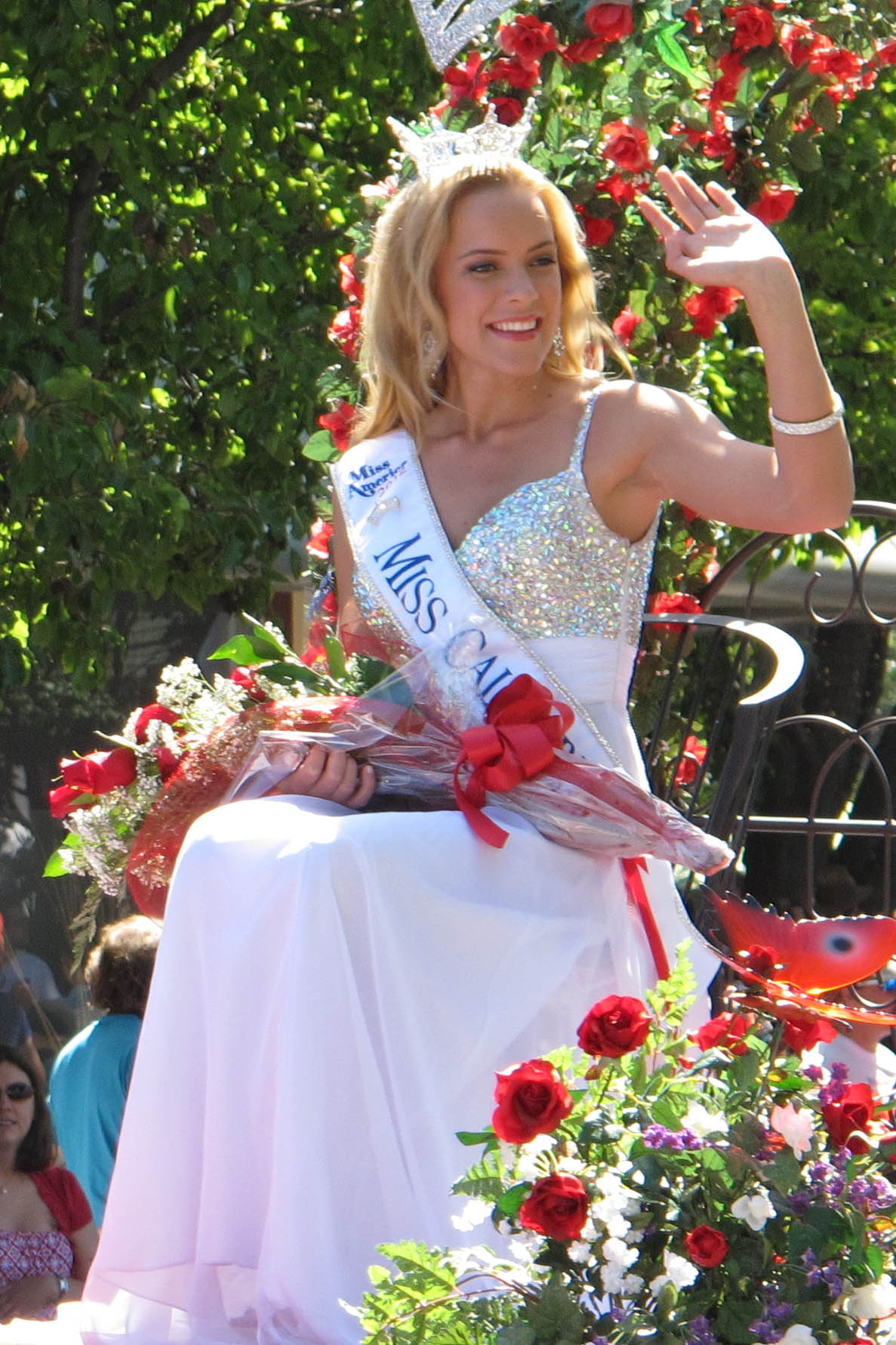
Leah Cecil,
Miss California 2012

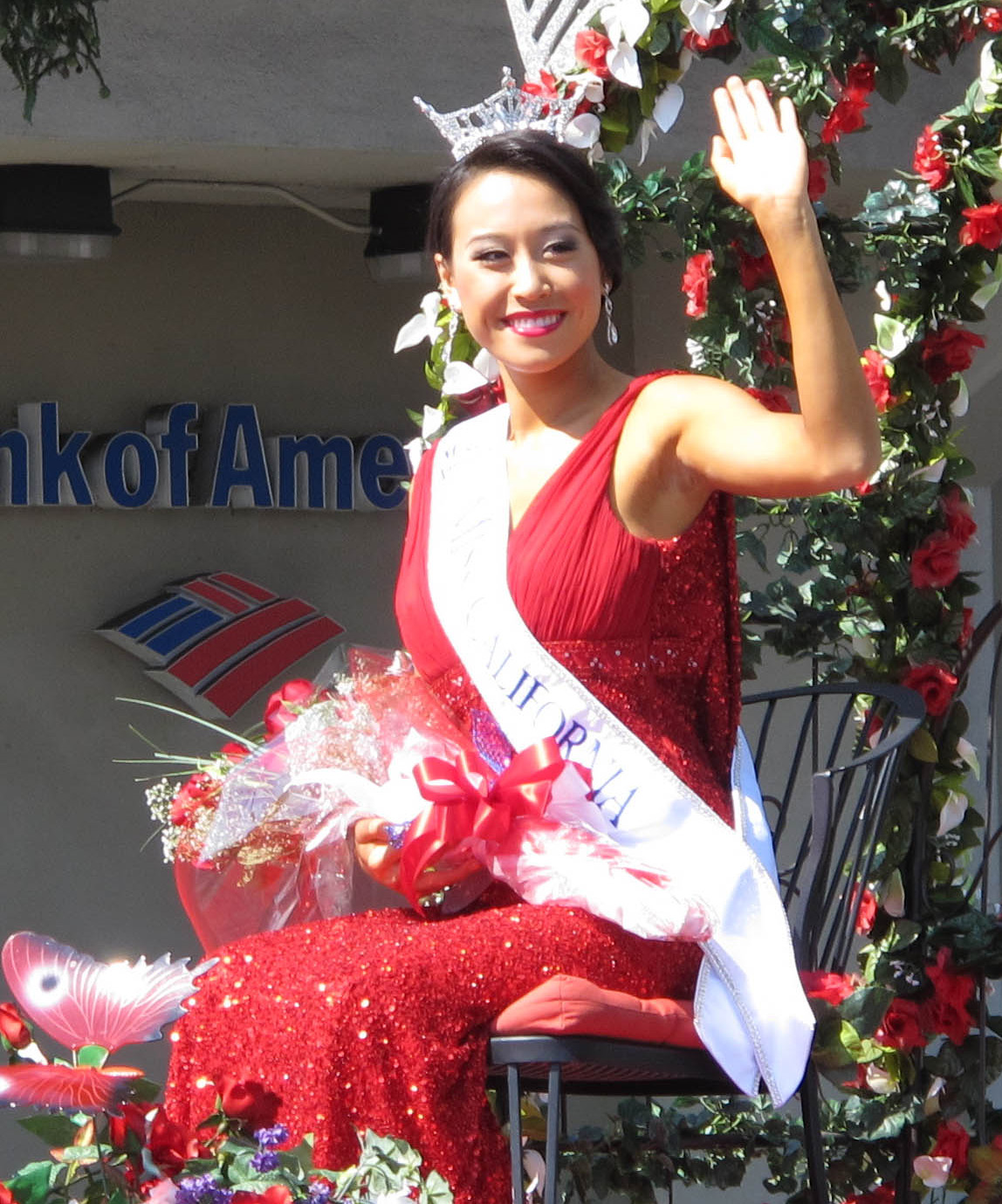
Crystal Lee,
Miss California 2013

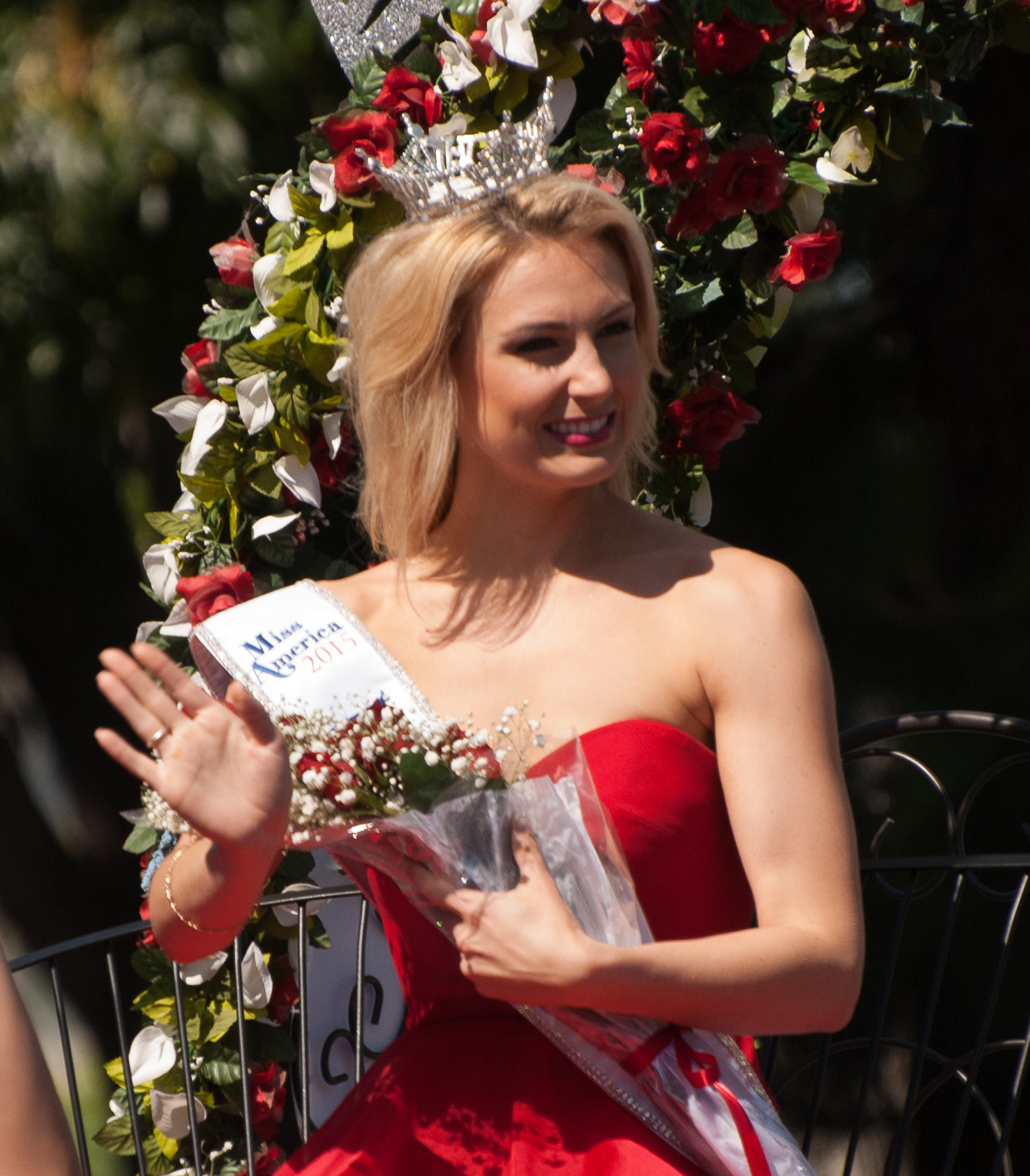
Bree Morse,
Miss California 2015

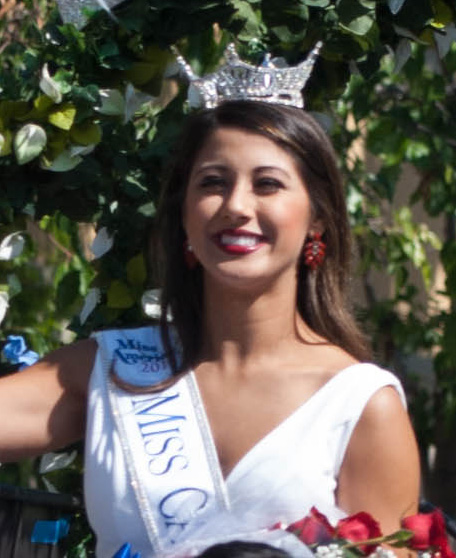
Jessa Carmack,
Miss California 2016

== Results summary ==
The following is a visual summary of the past results of Miss California titleholders at the national Miss America pageants/competitions. The year in parentheses indicates the year of the national competition during which a placement and/or award was garnered, not the year attached to the contestant's state title.

=== Placements ===
- Miss Americas: Fay Lanphier (1925), Rosemary LaPlanche (1941), Jean Bartel (1943), Marilyn Buferd (1946), Lee Meriwether (1955), Debra Maffett (1983)
- 1st runners-up: Adrienne Dore (1925), Phyllis Dobson (1936), Claire James (1938), Rosemary LaPlanche (1940), Phyllis Mathis (1945), Suzanne Reamo (1961), Charlene Dallas (1967), Lucianne Buchanan (1975), Kristy Cavinder (2010), Crystal Lee (2014)
- 2nd runners-up: Fay Lanphier (1924), Blanche MacDonald (1933), Jeanne Shores (1953), Susan Anton (1970), Janet Carr (1976), Rita Ng (2001)
- 3rd runners-up: Lillian Knight (1924), Phyllis Randall (1937) (tie), Marguerite Skliris (1939), Lorna Anderson (1958), Sandra Jennings (1959), Susan Bronson (1960), Linda Mouron (1977), Marlise Ricardos (1989), Tiffany Stoker (1996), Sharlize True Trujillo (2027)
- 4th runners-up: Lucille Lambert (1942), Laura Emery (1947), Jone Pedersen (1949), Rebekah Ann Keller (1998), Nicole Lamarche (2004), Veena Goel (2005), Noelle Freeman (2012)
- Top 7: Jackie Geist (2009)
- Top 8: Melissa Chaty (2008)
- Top 10: Patricia Johns (1954), Joan Beckett (1957), Susan Henryson (1962), Wendy Douglas (1964), Susan Shipley (1974), Connie Lee Haugen (1978), Jacquelynne Fontaine (2007), Arianna Afsar (2011), Jessa Carmack (2017)
- Top 12: Virginia Donham (1935), Shirley Ballard (1944)
- Top 13: Polly Ellis (1945)
- Top 15: Ruby Smith (1927), Bertha Weizel (1927), Eileen Kim (2020)
- Top 16: Joanne Durant (1951)
- Top 20: Stephanie Baldwin (2002)

=== Awards ===
==== Preliminary awards ====
- Preliminary Lifestyle and Fitness: Rosemary LaPlanche (1940 and 1941), Jean Bartel (1943), Marilyn Buferd (1946), Jone Pedersen (1950), Joanne Durant (1951), Jeanne Shores (1953), Patricia Johns (1954), Lee Meriwether (1955), Joan Beckett (1957), Sandra Jennings (1959), Sherri Raap (1965), Charlene Dallas (1967), Carolyn Stoner (1972), Lucianne Buchanan (1975), Janet Carr (1976), Debra Maffett (1983), Lisa Michelle Duncan (1994), Tiffany Stoker (1996), Rebekah Ann Keller (1998), Nicole Lamarche (2004)
- Preliminary Talent: Phyllis Dobson (1936), Phyllis Randall (1937), Marguerite Skliris (1939), Jean Bartel (1943), Polly Ellis (1945), Susan Henryson (1962), Charlene Dallas (1967), Debra Maffett (1983), Rita Ng (2001), Veena Goel (2005), Dustin-Leigh Konzelman (2006), Jacquelynne Fontaine (2007), Kristy Cavinder (2010)

==== Non-finalist awards ====
- Non-finalist talent: Sandra Lynne Becker (1966), Sharon Terrill (1969), Karin Kascher (1971), Christine Acton (1979), Lisa Kahre (1987), Maria Ostapiej (1991), Jennifer Hanson (1995), Danielle Coney (1999), MaryAnne Sapio (2000), Dustin-Leigh Konzelman (2006), Catherine Liang (2023)

==== Other awards ====
- Miss Congeniality: Susan Henryson (1962)
- Final Night Swimsuit: Nicole Lamarche (2004)
- Miss America Scholar: Rita Ng (2001)
- STEM Scholarship Award Winners: Crystal Lee (2014)
- Waterford Business Scholarship: Danielle Coney (1999)
- Women in Business Finalists: Catherine Liang (2023)

== Winners ==
- Declared as winner
- Ended as a runner-up
- Ended as a finalist or semi-finalist

Year	Name	Hometown	Age	Local Title	Miss America Talent	Placement at Miss America	Special scholarships at Miss America	Notes
2026	Sharlize True Trujillo	Los Angeles	22	Miss San Fernando Valley	Dance	3rd runner-up		
2025	Rachel Axt	Clovis	24	Miss Clovis	Vocal			Previously NAM Miss California 2021
2024	Kimberly Vernon	Santa Clara	27	Miss Santa Clara County	Jazz Dance, "Le Jazz Hot"			100th Miss California
2023	Sabrina Lewis	Berkeley	26	Miss Berkeley	HERStory			Previously Miss California USA 2021
2022	Catherine Liang	San Francisco	22	Miss San Francisco	Piano		Women in Business Finalist Non-finalist Talent Award	
2021	Jazmin Avalos	Garden Grove	24	Miss Los Angeles County	Vocal			
2019–20	Eileen Kim	Orange	22	Miss Culver City	Violin	Top 15		
2018	MacKenzie Freed	Lodi	23	Miss Treasure Island	Vocal, "Hit Me With a Hot Note"			
2017	Jillian Smith	Grass Valley	22	Miss Yosemite Valley	Piano, "Malaguena"			
2016	Jessa Carmack	Santa Clara	22	Miss North Bay	Gymnastics Dance	Top 10		Previously Miss California's Outstanding Teen 2011; Finalist at Miss America's Outstanding Teen 2011 pageant
2015	Bree Morse	Garden Grove	23	Miss Orange Coast	Tap Dance, "Land of a Thousand Dances"			
2014	Marina Inserra	San Diego	24	Miss Yosemite Valley	Vocal, "Bring Him Home" from Les Misérables			
2013	Crystal Lee	San Francisco	22	Miss Silicon Valley	Ballet en Pointe, "The Dying Swan"	1st runner-up	STEM Scholarship Award	Previously Miss California's Outstanding Teen 2008; Top 10 at Miss America's Outstanding Teen 2009 pageant Previously Miss Chinatown USA 2010 Cousin of Miss Louisiana 2016, Justine Ker
2012	Leah Cecil	Garden Grove	22	Miss Southern California Regional	Classical Harp, "Great Day" by Nancy Gustavson			Contestant at National Sweetheart 2011 pageant
2011	Noelle Freeman	Carlsbad	22	Miss Culver City	Ballet en Pointe, "The Black Swan Variation" from Swan Lake	4th runner-up		Previously Miss Teenage California 2007
2010	Arianna Afsar	San Diego	19	Miss San Diego County	Vocal, "I (Who Have Nothing)"	Top 10		Previously Miss California's Outstanding Teen 2005; 1st runner-up at Miss America's Outstanding Teen 2005 pageant Top 36 contestant on American Idol's 8th season Was cast as Elizabeth Schuyler Hamilton in the Chicago production of Hamilton
2009	Kristy Cavinder	Orange	21	Miss Yosemite Valley	Ballet en Pointe, "The Slave Maiden Variation" from Le Corsaire	1st runner-up	Preliminary Talent Award	
2008	Jackie Geist	Vacaville	22	Miss Hollywood	Ballet en Pointe, "The Dying Swan"	Top 7		
2007	Melissa Chaty	Ukiah	24	Miss North Coast	Operatic Vocal, "The Jewel Song" from Faust	Top 8		Previously Miss Teenage California 2003
2006	Jacquelynne Fontaine	Moorpark	24	Miss Santa Barbara County	Operatic Vocal, "Vissi d'arte"	Top 10	Preliminary Talent Award	
2005	Dustin-Leigh Konzelman	Carlsbad	23	Miss San Diego	Fiddle, "Twelfth Street Rag"		Non-finalist Talent Award Preliminary Talent Award	Contestant on The Amazing Race 10 with Kandice Pelletier, Miss New York 2005
2004	Veena Goel	Laguna Hills	22	Miss Southland	Jazz Dance, "Hot Honey Rag" from Chicago	4th runner-up	Preliminary Talent Award	Contestant at National Sweetheart 2003 pageant
2003	Nicole Lamarche	Berkeley	24	Miss San Francisco	Vocal, "At This Moment"	4th runner-up	Final Night Swimsuit Award Preliminary Swimsuit Award	Contestant at National Sweetheart 2001 pageant as Miss Arizona
2002	Jennifer Glover	Castro Valley	23	Miss Contra Costa County	Contemporary Vocal, "A New Life" from Jekyll & Hyde			Represented the United States at Miss International 1999 as Miss USA Previously Miss California USA 2001
2001	Stephanie Baldwin	Fullerton	23	Miss Northern California Regional	Vocal, "Time to Say Goodbye"	Top 20		
2000	Rita Ng	Tracy	22	Miss Los Altos	Classical Piano, "Sonata Appassionata"	2nd runner-up	Miss America Scholar Award Preliminary Talent Award	
1999	MaryAnne Sapio	Rohnert Park	21	Miss Gavilan Hills	Tap Dance, "Go Daddy-O"		Non-finalist Talent Award	
1998	Danielle Coney	Santa Clara	21	Miss Gavilan Hills	Vocal, "A Piece of Sky" from Yentl		Non-finalist Talent Award Waterford Business Scholarship	
1997	Rebekah Ann Keller	Lakewood	22	Miss Los Angeles County	Vocal, "Someone Like You" from Jekyll & Hyde	4th runner-up	Preliminary Swimsuit Award	Later Miss California USA 2000
1996	Lyndsay Kahler	Orange	22	Miss City of Orange	Vocal, "Where Is It Written?" from Yentl			
1995	Tiffany Stoker	Clovis	21	Miss Clovis	Vocal, "Think of Me" from The Phantom of the Opera	3rd runner-up	Preliminary Swimsuit Award	Previously America's Junior Miss 1992
1994	Jennifer Hanson	La Habra	21	Miss Garden Grove	Vocal, "Since I Fell for You"		Non-finalist Talent Award	
1993	Lisa Michelle Duncan	Tulare	21	Miss Tulare County	Character Ballet, "Turkey in the Straw"		Preliminary Swimsuit Award	
1992	Patricia Northrup	Agoura Hills	23	Miss Los Angeles County	Vocal Medley			Pilot for American Airlines Judge for the Miss America 2001 pageant
1991	Paige Adams	Hemet	22	Miss Los Angeles County	Vocal, "Some Day My Prince Will Come"			Previously Alaska's Junior Miss 1986 Judge for the Miss America 2008 pageant
1990	Maria Ostapiej	La Mesa	24	Miss San Diego North County	Vocal Medley, "Phantom of the Opera" & "Angel of Music"		Non-finalist Talent Award	
1989	Wendy Berry	San Pedro	22	Miss Centinela Valley	Classical Ballet, "The Black Swan" from Swan Lake			Professor at Yale University
1988	Marlise Ricardos	San Pedro	26	Miss Lomita	Dramatic Vocal, "I Dreamed a Dream" from Les Misérables	3rd runner-up		
1987	Simone Stephens	Cerritos	25	Miss El Camino	Stand-up Comedy			
1986	Lisa Kahre	Salinas	19	Miss San Ramon Valley	Flute, "Carnival of Venice"		Non-finalist Talent Award	
1985	Lisa Davenport	Santa Cruz	23	Miss San Mateo County	Popular Vocal, "Once in my Lifetime"			Previously named Miss California 1982 when the original winner, Debra Maffett, won the Miss America 1983 pageant Became the first titleholder to hold a state title twice
1984	Donna Grace Cherry	Northridge	24	Miss West Los Angeles	Vocal Impressions"			
1983	Shari Moskau	Mission Viejo	19	Miss Saddleback Valley	Popular Vocal, "Greatest Love of All"			
1982	Lisa Davenport	Santa Cruz	20	Miss Tulare County		Did not compete; later assumed the title after Maffett won Miss America 1983		
1982	Lisa Davenport	Santa Cruz	20	Miss Tulare County				Later Miss California 1985
1982	Debra Maffett	Anaheim	25	Miss Anaheim	Popular Vocal, "Come In From the Rain"	Winner	Preliminary Swimsuit Award Preliminary Talent Award	
1981	Cheryl Vancleave	Riverside	20	Miss Los Angeles County	Country Vocal Medley, "I Was Country When Country Wasn't Cool" & "You're Lookin' at Country"			Later married Frank Kalil Mother of Ryan Kalil and Matt Kalil
1980	Robin Brooks	Elverta	23	Miss Fullerton	Vocal Medley, "America the Beautiful" & "Battle Hymn of the Republic"			
1979	Deanna Rae Fogarty	Azusa	22	Miss Azusa	Vocal, "Cabaret"			
1978	Christine Acton	Chula Vista	23	Miss San Bernardino County	Flute / Piccolo, "Hungarian Peasant Suite"		Non-finalist Talent Award	
1977	Connie Lee Haugen	Redlands	24	Miss San Bernardino County	Vocal, "Nobody Does It Like Me" from Seesaw	Top 10		
1976	Linda Mouron	Orange	19	Miss Orange County	Tap Dance, "Puttin' On the Ritz"	3rd runner-up		
1975	Janet Carr	San Gabriel	21	Miss Pomona Valley	Vocal, "They Call the Wind Maria" from Paint Your Wagon	2nd runner-up	Preliminary Swimsuit Award	
1974	Lucianne Buchanan	Claremont	21	Miss Pomona Valley	Harp, "Concerto in B Flat"	1st runner-up	Preliminary Swimsuit Award	Assumed title when the original winner, Alice Tobler, resigned due to mononucleosis
1973	Susan Shipley	Hillsborough	21	Miss San Joaquin County	Piano, "Malaguena"	Top 10		
1972	Diane Wagner	Daly City	20	Miss San Mateo County	Ballet, "Swan Lake"			
1971	Carolyn Stoner	Belmont	18	Miss San Mateo County	Gymnastic Ballet, "Malaguena"		Preliminary Swimsuit Award	
1970	Karin Kascher	Castro Valley	18	Miss Hayward	Violin, "Méditation"		Non-finalist Talent Award	
1969	Susan Anton	Yucaipa	18	Miss Redlands	Vocal, "Get Happy" & "Put On a Happy Face"	2nd runner-up		Actress best known for her role as "Susan Williams" in the various Stop Susan Williams!-related television series and television movies
1968	Sharon Terrill	Torrance	21	Miss Torrance	Dramatic Reading, "Little Word, Little White Bird" by Carl Sandburg		Non-finalist Talent Award	
1967	Karen Pursell	Lindsay	22	Miss Fresno County	Vocal, "Much More" from The Fantasticks			
1966	Charlene Dallas	Danville	19	Miss Contra Costa County	Piano, "Toccata" by Khachaturian	1st runner-up	Preliminary Swimsuit Award Preliminary Talent Award	Assumed title when the original winner, Donna Danzer, resigned for school and personal reasons
1965	Sandra Lynne Becker	Covina	18	Miss Los Angeles County	Semi-classical Vocal, "Make Believe"		Non-finalist Talent Award	
1964	Sherrie Raap	Fremont	18	Miss Oakland	Jazz Baton Dance & Acrobatics		Preliminary Swimsuit Award	
1963	Wendy Douglas	Sacramento		Miss Sacramento	Vocal, "Summertime"	Top 10		
1962	Pamela Gamble	Carmel	18	Miss Monterey County	Classical Jazz Interpretive Dance			
1961	Susan Henryson	Fresno	19	Miss Fresno County	Vocal, "You've Got to See Momma Every Night"	Top 10	Miss Congeniality Preliminary Talent Award	
1960	Suzanne Reamo	La Mesa	20	Miss San Diego	Vocal, "Love is Where You Find It"	1st runner-up		
1959	Susan Bronson	San Lorenzo	19	Miss Southern Alameda County	Modern Dance, "An American in Spain"	3rd runner-up		
1958	Sandra Jennings	Riverside		Miss Riverside	Piano, "Clair de Lune"	3rd runner-up	Preliminary Swimsuit Award	
1957	Lorna Anderson	Sacramento		Miss Sacramento	Accordion, "Dark Eyes"	3rd runner-up		
1956	Joan Beckett	Sacramento		Miss Sacramento	Dramatic Sketch, "A Dream: Faith Over Atheistic Sciences"	Top 10	Preliminary Swimsuit Award	
1955	Barbara Harris	Santa Cruz		Miss Watsonville	Vocal, "Over the Rainbow"			
1954	Lee Meriwether	San Francisco	19	Miss San Francisco	Dramatic Monologue from Riders to the Sea	Winner	Preliminary Swimsuit Award	Actress best known as Betty Jones in the 1970s television series Barnaby Jones
1953	Patricia Johns	Fresno		Miss Fresno	Dramatic Monologue from The Country Girl	Top 10	Preliminary Swimsuit Award	
1952	Jeanne Shores	Azusa		Miss Alhambra	Dramatic Monologue	2nd runner-up	Preliminary Swimsuit Award	
1951	Patricia Marie Lehman	Sacramento	25	Miss Sacramento	Piano			
1950	Joanne Durant	San Diego		Miss San Diego	Vocal / Poetry Recitation, "Alice Blue Gown"	Top 16	Preliminary Swimsuit Award	
1949	Jone Pedersen	Santa Rosa		Miss Sonoma County	Dramatic Monologue, "You Will Come Back"	4th runner-up	Preliminary Swimsuit Award	
1948	Reba Lauretta Watterson	Stockton	19	Miss Stockton				
1947	Laura Emery	Salinas	18	Miss California	Vocal, "So Long for so Long"	4th runner-up		Multiple California representatives Contestants competed under local title at Miss America pageant
1947	Marilyn Davidson	Los Angeles		Miss Los Angeles County	Vocal / Dress Design, "A Sunday Kind of Love"			Multiple California representatives Contestants competed under local title at Miss America pageant
1946	Marilyn Buferd	Los Angeles	21	Miss Wilshire District	Dramatic Monologue from Accent on Youth	Winner	Preliminary Swimsuit Award	
1945	Polly Ellis	Tarzana		Miss California	Vocal, "Ragtime Cowboy Joe"	Top 13	Preliminary Talent Award	Multiple California representatives Contestants competed under local title at Miss America pageant
1945	Phyllis Mathis	San Diego		Miss San Diego	Hula	1st runner-up		Multiple California representatives Contestants competed under local title at Miss America pageant
1944	Shirley Ballard	Los Angeles				Top 12		
1943	Jean Bartel	Los Angeles	19		Vocal, "Night and Day"	Winner	Preliminary Swimsuit Award Preliminary Talent Award	
1942	Lucille Lambert	Hollywood		Miss Hollywood	Vocal, "Embraceable You"	4th runner-up		
1941	Rosemary LaPlanche	Los Angeles	18		Dance	Winner	Preliminary Swimsuit Award	
1940	Rosemary LaPlanche	Los Angeles	17		Dance	1st runner-up	Preliminary Swimsuit Award	
1939	Marguerite Skliris	San Francisco		Miss San Francisco	Dramatic Monologue, "The Poison Scene" from Romeo and Juliet	3rd runner-up	Preliminary Talent Award	
1938	Claire James	Los Angeles		Miss Los Angeles	Dance	1st runner-up		
1937	Phyllis Randall	Hollywood	20	Miss Hollywood	Vocal / Dance	3rd runner-up (tie)	Preliminary Talent Award	Sister of Miss North Carolina 1941, Joey Augusta Paxton
1936	Phyllis Dobson	Hollywood		Miss Hollywood	Drama	1st runner-up	Preliminary Talent Award	
1935	Virginia Donham	San Francisco		Miss San Francisco	Vocal, "Chlo-e" & "I Ain't Got Nobody"	Top 12		
1934	No national pageant was held							
1933	Blanche MacDonald	Los Angeles		Miss Venus de Milo	N/A	2nd runner-up		
1932	No national pageants were held							
1931	No national pageants were held							
1930	No national pageants were held							
1929	No national pageants were held							
1928	No national pageants were held							
1927	Ruby Smith	Oakland		Miss Oakland	N/A	Top 15		Multiple California representatives Contestants competed under local title at national pageant
1927	Naoma Farrand	San Francisco		Miss San Francisco	N/A			Multiple California representatives Contestants competed under local title at national pageant
1927	Bertha Weizel	Los Angeles		Miss Santa Cruz	N/A	Top 15		Multiple California representatives Contestants competed under local title at national pageant
1927	Louise Heathman	Los Angeles		Miss Southern California	N/A			Multiple California representatives Contestants competed under local title at national pageant
1926	Eleanor Twohig	San Francisco		Miss San Francisco	N/A			Competed under local title at national pageant
1925	Fay Lanphier	Oakland	19	Miss California	N/A	Winner		Multiple California representatives Contestants competed under local title at national pageant
1925	Adrienne Dore	Los Angeles		Miss Los Angeles	N/A	1st runner-up		Multiple California representatives Contestants competed under local title at national pageant
1925	Edyth Flyn	San Francisco		Miss San Francisco	N/A			Multiple California representatives Contestants competed under local title at national pageant
1925	Yetta Haber	Santa Cruz		Miss Santa Cruz	N/A			Multiple California representatives Contestants competed under local title at national pageant
1924	Lillian Knight	Los Angeles		Miss Los Angeles	N/A	3rd runner-up		Multiple California representatives Contestants competed under local title at national pageant
1924	Fay Lanphier	Santa Cruz	18	Miss Santa Cruz	N/A	2nd runner-up		Multiple California representatives Contestants competed under local title at national pageant
1924	Irma Frazier	Oakland		Miss Oakland	N/A			Multiple California representatives Contestants competed under local title at national pageant
1923	Violet Regal	San Francisco		Miss San Francisco	N/A			Competed under local title at national pageant
1922	Katherine Grant	Los Angeles		Miss Los Angeles	N/A			Multiple California representatives Contestants competed under local title at national pageant
1922	Tanssia Zara	San Francisco		Miss San Francisco	N/A			Multiple California representatives Contestants competed under local title at national pageant
1921	No California representative at Miss America pageant							
