= Noelle Freeman =

American beauty pageant titleholder (born 1989)

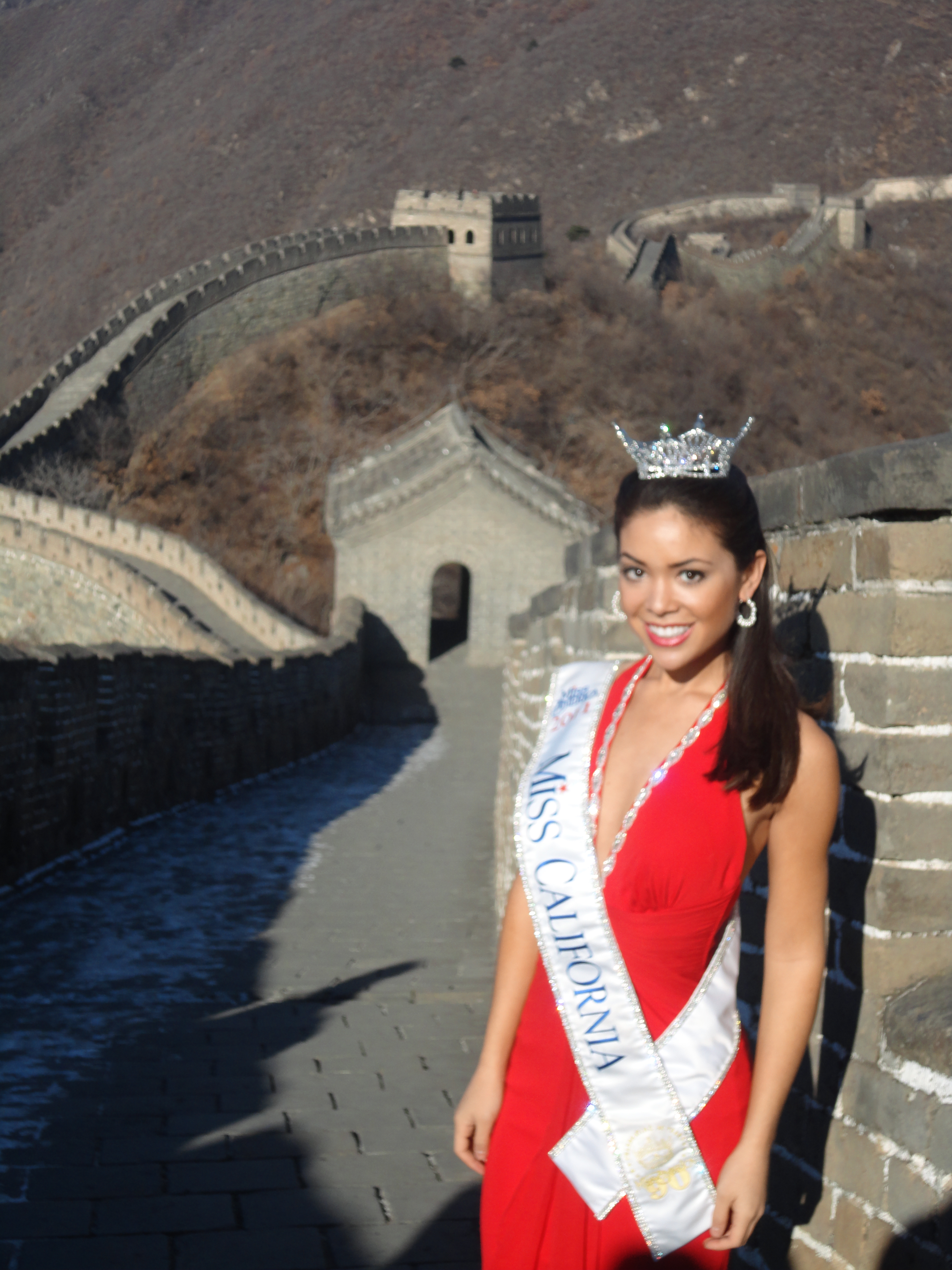
- Born: Noelle Hope Freeman; August 16, 1989 (age 37); Carlsbad, California, U.S.
- Education: Chapman University
- Height: 5 ft 6 in (168 cm)
- Beauty pageant titleholder
- Title: Miss Teenage California 2007; Miss City of Orange 2009; Miss Culver City 2011; Miss California 2011
- Hair color: Brunette
- Eye color: Brown
- Major competition: Miss America 2012 (4th runner-up)
- Website: http://www.noellefreeman.com/

Noelle Hope Freeman (born August 16, 1989) is an American entrepreneur and founder of The DMS Agency.

== Early life and education ==
Freeman was born in San Diego County, California on August 16, 1989. She graduated from Carlsbad High School and is an alumna of Chapman University with a degrees in Advertising/Public Relations and Communication Studies. She was an active member of Delta Gamma sorority and served as the President in 2010.

== Pageantry ==
Freeman began competing in pageants at the age of 16, winning the title of San Diego's Junior Miss. Freeman went on to become Miss Teenage California 2007, Miss City of Orange 2009, Miss Culver City 2011, and Miss California 2011. She competed in the Miss America 2012 pageant where she placed 5th among all contestants.

=== Miss California 2011 ===
In February 2011, Freeman won the local Miss Culver City title. She competed in the Miss California pageant in June 2011, and was crowned Miss California. For her state talent, she performed The Black Swan ballet variation.

Awards and achievements
| Preceded by Arianna Afsar | Miss California; 2011 | Succeeded by Leah Cecil |
