= Rebekah Ann Keller =

American beauty pageant titleholder (born 1974)

- Beauty pageant titleholder
- Title: Miss California 1997; Miss California USA 2000
- Hair color: Brown
- Eye color: Brown
- Major competition: Miss America

Rebekah Ann Keller is an American beauty pageant titleholder who was crowned Miss California 1997. She competed at Miss America 1998, where she won a swimsuit award and finished fourth runner-up. She later became Miss California USA 2000.

Awards and achievements
Preceded by Lyndsay Kahler	Miss California; 1998	Succeeded by Danielle Coney
Preceded by Angelique Breaux	Miss California USA; 2000	Succeeded by Jennifer Glover
