= Jean Bartel =

American actress

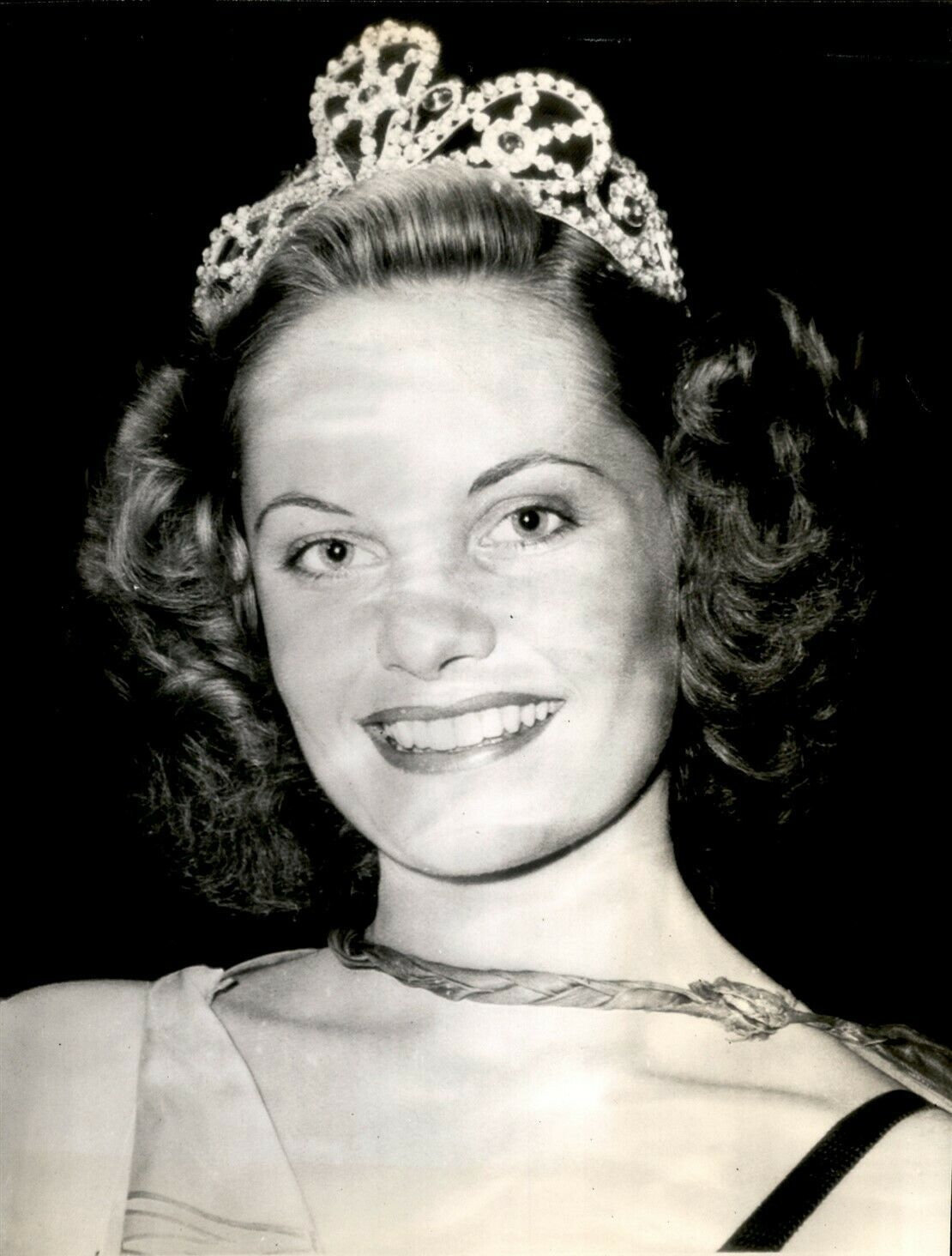
- Bartel after winning Miss America 1943
- Born: Jean Margaret Bartlemeh; October 26, 1923; Los Angeles, California, U.S.
- Died: March 6, 2011 (aged 87); Los Angeles, California, U.S.
- Occupations: Actress, model
- Title: Miss California 1943; Miss America 1943
- Predecessor: Jo-Carroll Dennison
- Successor: Venus Ramey
- Spouses: Don Perry Norton (m. 1953) William J. Hogue (m. 1970; died 2001)

Jean Bartel (born Jean Bartlemeh; October 26, 1923 – March 6, 2011) was Miss California and Miss America 1943.

== Early life ==
Bartel was from Los Angeles. She was born Jean Bartlemeh; later her name was shortened to Bartel.

== Pageantry ==
She initially entered the pageant after learning one of the judges was Broadway actor and producer, W. Horace Schmidlapp. As talent counted for 50% of the score, she thought it was a way to launch her career on Broadway. Not only was she named Miss America after a vocal performance the press hailed as "forceful and dramatic", but she landed a career on Broadway and an agent who booked her on tours in South America, the Middle East, Europe, Canada, and in every State of the Union except Maine. She won the talent and swimsuit awards at the national pageant. At 5 feet 8 inches tall, Bartel was the tallest pageant winner up to that time. There had been comparisons between Bartel and popular blond actress Carole Lombard.

She was the first college student to win the title of Miss America. After visiting her sorority sisters in Kappa Kappa Gamma around the country, she and her travelling companion developed the idea of awarding scholarships to those who competed in the Miss America Organization. The Miss America Organization is now the world's largest provider of scholarships for women in the world.

== Career ==
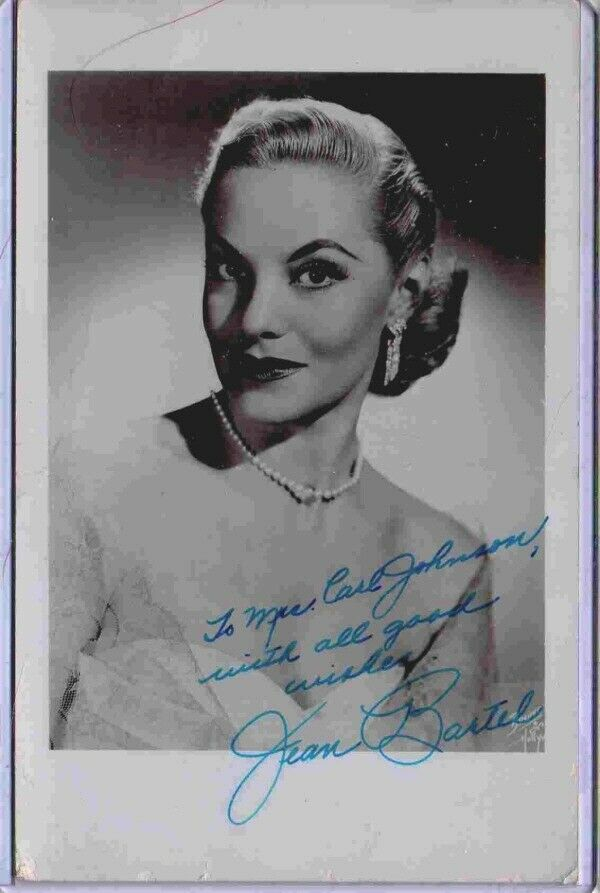
Autographed photo on 1955 postcard

In 1946 she appeared on stage in The Desert Song at the New York City Center for Music and Drama. Notably she appeared as the female lead in the Broadway production of George Gershwin's Of Thee I Sing in 1952.

She sold more Series E bonds in 1943 than any other United States citizen, amounting to over $2.5 million. Eighty percent of those bonds were sold to women.

Bartel worked for many years on Broadway and in television, including starring in her own travel series, It's a Woman's World, as well as performing for seven months in South America.

She appeared in Perry Mason, S8, E8 "The Case of the Place Called Midnight" as Helga. Later she appeared In an episode of The Love Boat in 1984, along with Marian McKnight, Miss America 1957; Nancy Fleming, Miss America 1961; and Vanessa L. Williams, Miss America, 1984.

== Personal life ==
Bartel died in the Brentwood neighborhood of Los Angeles, on March 6, 2011, aged 87. The Miss America Organization issued a statement calling her "one of our most beloved Miss Americas". The Quality of Life award, given out yearly to one Miss America contestant was named after Bartel.

Awards and achievements
Preceded by Jo-Carroll Dennison	Miss America; 1943	Succeeded by Venus Ramey
Preceded by Lucille Lambert	Miss California; 1943	Succeeded by Shirley Ballard
