= Melissa Chaty =

American beauty pageant winner

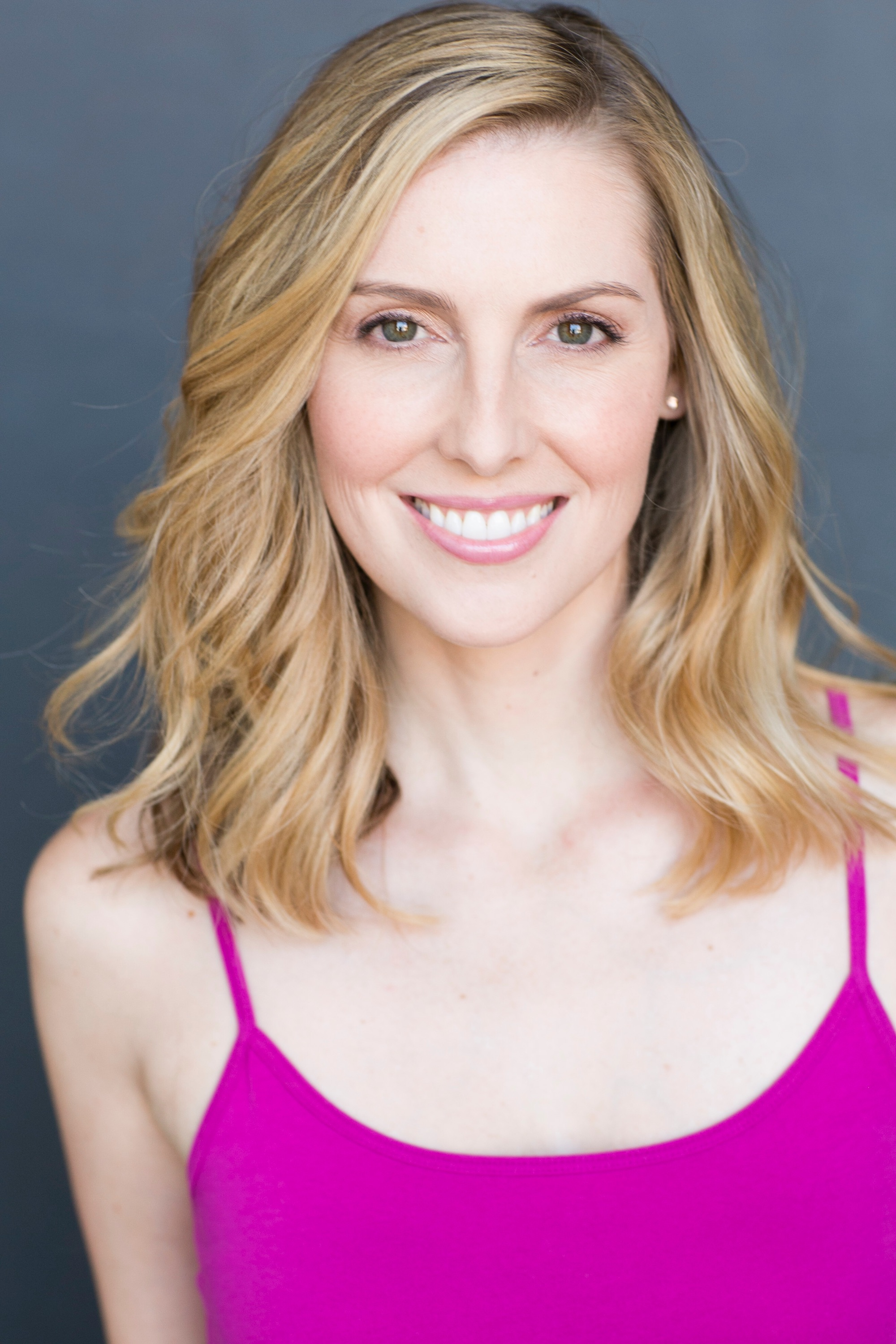
- Born: Melissa Ivonne Chaty; January 23, 1984 (age 42); Ukiah, California, U.S.
- Beauty pageant titleholder
- Title: Miss California 2007
- Hair color: Blond
- Major competition: Miss America

Melissa Ivonne Chaty (born January 23, 1984) is an American beauty pageant titleholder from Ukiah, California. She was Miss Mendocino is 2002, held the titles of Miss Teenage California 2003 and Miss California 2007 and finished in the top 8 at Miss America in 2008.

== Biography ==
Chaty graduated from Westmont College in 2006 with a degree in psychology and as of 2008 worked for the Alzheimer's Association. Chaty was also Miss Mendocino in 2002, and a top 10 semifinalist for 2003 Miss Teen of Nation. She grew up singing in church and has performed the national anthem for the San Diego Chargers, the Padres, and on TV.

Awards and achievements
Preceded by Jacquelynne Fontaine	Miss California; 2007	Succeeded by Jackie Geist
