= Sandra Lynne Becker =

American beauty pageant contestant (1947–2015)

Sandra Lynne Becker (April 5, 1947 – May 15, 2015) was born in Covina, California. She competed in many beauty pageants during her senior year of high school, and in 1965 became the youngest woman ever to receive the Miss California crown. After winning the crown, Becker traveled with Bob Hope to Vietnam with the USO tour. She also performed with many young American singers at the time, including Perry Como, Angela Lansbury, and Tennessee Ernie Ford. During a 5-year contract with Warner Brother Studios she appeared in several films and TV shows, including Bewitched, Marcus Welby, M.D., and Here Come the Brides.

== Later years ==
Becker has two daughters. She resided in Sacramento, California in 2006, where she worked as a realtor and sang for Christian women's clubs around the nation.

She died May 15, 2015, in Sacramento California, at the age of 68.

== Sources ==
Awards and achievements
Preceded by Sherri Raap	Miss California; 1965	Succeeded by Charlene Dallas
