= Venus Ramey =

American beauty pageant contestant and activist

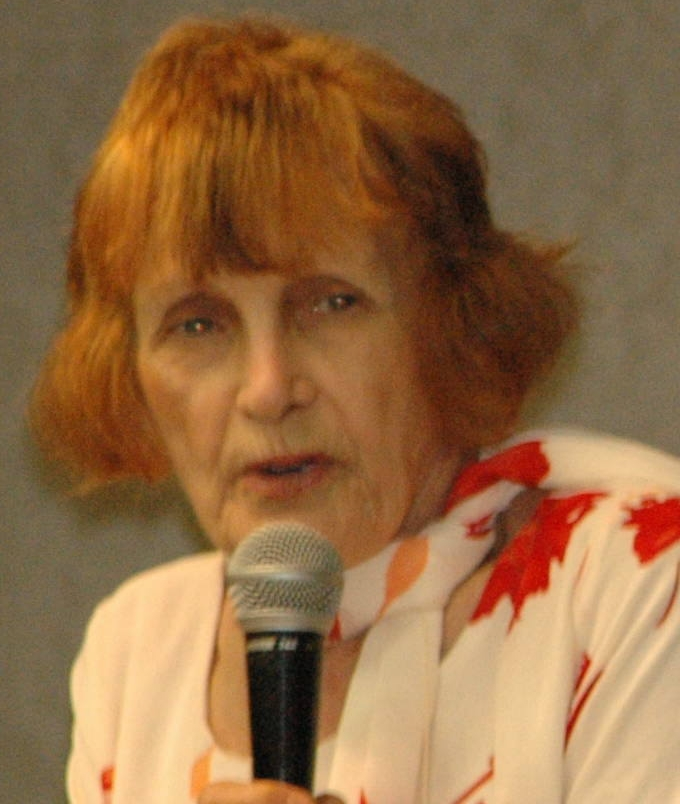
- Venus Ramey in 2007
- Born: September 26, 1924; Somerset, Kentucky, US
- Died: June 17, 2017 (aged 92); Agoura Hills, California, US
- Occupations: Tobacco farmer, activist
- Title: Miss America 1944
- Predecessor: Jean Bartel
- Successor: Bess Myerson
- Spouse(s): Joseph H. Murphy, Jr. (m. 1948)
- Children: 2

Venus Ramey Murphy (née Ramey; September 26, 1924 – June 17, 2017) was an American beauty pageant contestant, and later an activist. She won the Miss America competition in Atlantic City, New Jersey, on September 9, 1944.

== Early life ==
Ramey was born in Somerset, Kentucky, to Evalena (née Brown; 1889–1967) and John Coons Ramey (1887–1970). She later left Kentucky to work for the war effort in Washington, DC. Through her patriline, Ramey was distantly related to Country musicians Loretta Lynn, Crystal Gayle, Jay Lee Webb, Peggy Sue and Patty Loveless.

== Pageants ==
She won the Miss District of Columbia pageant and then became Miss America in 1944. She was the first Miss America to be photographed in color and also the first red-haired contestant to win the national title.

== Career ==
She was wooed by Hollywood in 1947, but dissatisfied with show business, she returned home to her Eubank, Kentucky, tobacco farm (which she maintained for over 50 years) in Lincoln County, Kentucky.

Ramey became the first Miss America to run for public office, seeking a seat in the Kentucky House of Representatives. In the 1970s, Ramey successfully campaigned to save Over-the-Rhine, a neighborhood in Cincinnati, Ohio. The neighborhood was eventually listed on the National Register of Historic Places, and her work led her to make an unsuccessful bid for a spot on the Cincinnati City Council.

She was a tobacco farmer who, in 1999, filed an unsuccessful lawsuit against the federal government for $300 billion for its anti-tobacco policies. She also was a write-in candidate for the 2000 presidential election.

In April 2007, at age 82, Ramey confronted intruders who had entered a storage building on her Waynesburg, Kentucky farm where thieves had previously stolen equipment. She used a snub-nose .38 revolver to shoot out the tires on their pickup truck, then flagged down a car and had the driver call 911, holding the would-be thieves at gun-point until the sheriff arrived. "I didn't even think twice. I just went and did it", she said. "If they'd even dared come close to me, they'd be six feet under by now."

== Tributes ==
In 1944, a B-17 of the 15th Air Force, 301st bomb group was named the "Venus Ramey." This plane is reputed to be one of the longest-lived B-17s of the war, having flown over 150 missions and survived the war. It was later scrapped. There was also a B-24 Liberator bomber (42-52312) in the 454th bomb group named "MISS AMERICA '44" which flew 133 missions.

== Personal life ==
She married Joseph Henry Murphy Jr. in 1948; the couple later divorced. Ramey raised two sons, Joseph Henry "Hank" Murphy III and Martin Wallace "Wally" Murphy, who survive her.

Ramey died in an Agoura Hills, California, hospice on June 17, 2017, at the age of 92. Her funeral was held at a Science Hill, Kentucky, funeral home on July 2, 2017, followed by burial at the Eubank Cemetery in Pulaski County, Kentucky.

Awards and achievements
Preceded by Jean Bartel	Miss America; 1944	Succeeded by Bess Myerson
Preceded by Dixie Lou Rafter	Miss Washington, D.C. 1944	Succeeded by Dorothy Powell
