= Martian Land =

2015 film

- Directed by: Scott Wheeler
- Written by: Jeremy M. Inman
- Produced by: David Michael Latt; David Rimawi; Paul Bales
- Starring: Alan Pietruszewski; Lane Townsend; Jennifer Dorogi
- Cinematography: Mark Atkins
- Edited by: Mark Atkins; Ryan Mitchelle; Erica Steele
- Music by: Christopher Cano
- Distributed by: The Asylum
- Release date: October 6, 2015
- Running time: 86 minutes
- Country: United States
- Language: English

Martian Land is a 2015 direct-to-video Science fiction action film directed by Scott Wheeler and starring Alan Pietruszewski, Lane Townsend and Jennifer Dorogi. It was made by The Asylum. In the tradition of The Asylum's catalog, Martian Land is a mockbuster of the film The Martian.

== Plot ==
In the distant future, the human race has made Earth all but uninhabitable due to overpopulation, pollution, the eruption of the Yellowstone volcano, and misuse of the planet's resources. Now mankind lives on Mars, in cities that resemble those once found on Earth, and are protected from the alien environment by dome-like force-fields. When a sandstorm of record intensity breaks through the dome and destroys Mars New York, those in Mars Los Angeles must figure out how to stop the storm before it wipes them out next. The sandstorm's power was heightened due to the terraforming efforts on Mars reactivating long dormant volcanoes.

Dr. Foster is sent from Earth to Mars Los Angeles, "MLA," to find a solution to stopping the storm from hitting the city, but is partnered with Neil, a pilot who is dating Foster's ex-wife Miranda. Dr. Foster is more interested in cleaning up Earth, and comes up with a last ditch plan to use EMF pulses to weaken the storm. Miranda, the lead researcher based on Mars, is distracted as their teenage daughter Ellie, is trapped in the tunnels beneath the ruins of Mars New York, "MNY," with her girlfriend/life partner, Ida. The two of them are trying to find a safe passage to MLA, as the series of tunnels that once connected the cities have been blocked or destroyed. Reiger is the military commander who feels that the scientist's response is inadequate to prevent loss of life.

== Cast ==
- Alan Pietruszewski as Neil
- Lane Townsend as Foster
- Jennifer Dorogi as Miranda
- Arianna Afsar as Ellie
- Chloe Farnworth as Ida
- Dionne Neish as Reiger
- Eddy Owdish as Klaus
- Caroline Attwood as Dana
- James Wong as Bryce
- Chaim Dunbar as Andrews
- Dan Czerwonka as Carlos
- Caroline Williams as Ulyana

== Reception ==
Radio Times gave the movie 2 out of 5 stars. The Movie Scene also gave the movie 2 out of 5 stars, noting that Lane Townsend's acting was the best part of the movie. Movie Mag found the premise of the movie intriguing, but found that the movie "screwed it up at every turn." Moria noted that while this movie used the same setting as The Martian, of which it is said to be a mockbuster, that the story was entirely different. Moria also notes that this movie works better than most of the Asylum's other movies, although the scientific accuracy of the movie is questionable.

== See also ==
- List of films set on Mars
