= Miss America 2006 =

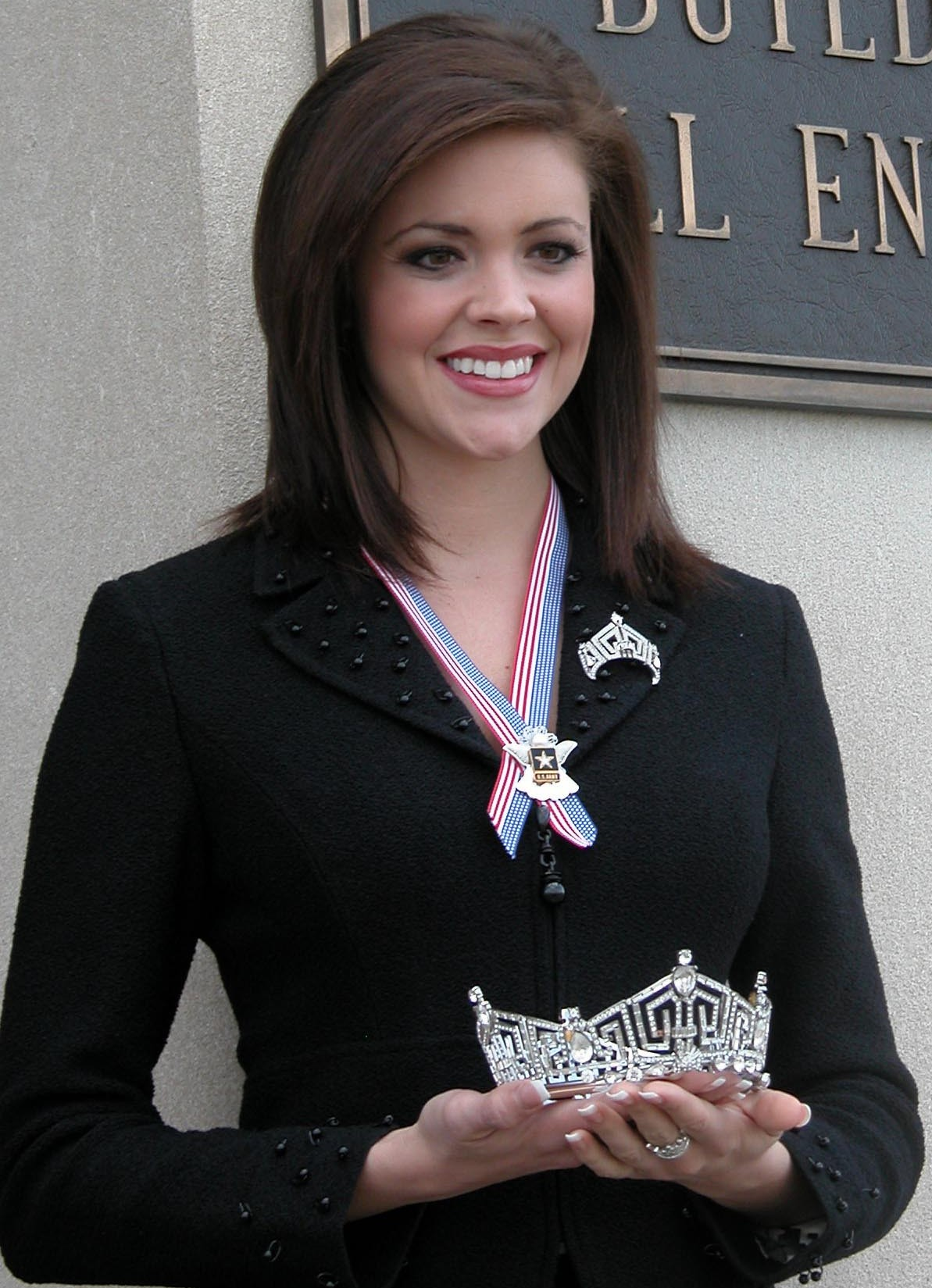
- Miss America 2006 Jennifer Berry poses in front of the Pentagon.
- Date: January 21, 2006
- Presenters: James Denton
- Venue: Aladdin Resort and Casino, Las Vegas, Nevada
- Broadcaster: CMT
- Winner: Jennifer Berry; Oklahoma

Miss America 2006, the 79th Miss America pageant, was held on the Las Vegas Strip in Paradise, Nevada on Saturday, January 21, 2006.

The pageant was broadcast live on CMT from the Theatre for the Performing Arts at the Aladdin Resort and Casino, the first time that the pageant was held outside Atlantic City. The pageant was held four months later than usual.

At the conclusion of the final night of competition, Deidre Downs, Miss America 2005, crowned Jennifer Berry of Oklahoma as her successor. This was the first time since 2001 that the pageant winner was not a vocalist; Berry was also the first titleholder since to also win a preliminary talent award.

== Selection of contestants ==
One delegate from each state was chosen in state pageants held in mid-2005. Prior to competing in state pageants, the majority of delegates first were required to win a local title. Each delegates title is pre-dated to 2005, for example Alexa Jones was Miss Alabama 2005 rather than Miss Alabama 2006. Many contestants competed in state pageants in both the Miss America and Miss USA systems numerous times before winning titles, and some had previously in states other than those where they won a state title.

All contestants were required to be between the ages of 17–24, unmarried and a citizen of the United States. They were also required to meet residency and education requirements.

== Competition ==
All delegates compete in an interview competition with the judges, based on their platform issue, and also in the swimsuit, evening gown and talent competitions.

Prior to the nationally televised competition, the delegates participate in three nights of preliminary competition, where preliminary award winners are chosen in each category.

During the final telecast, following the announcement of the semi-finalists, the top ten compete in swimsuit and evening gown. The top five go on to compete in the talent competition, and the top three face a final interview round.

== Results ==
=== Placements ===
Final results	Contestant
Miss America 2006	Oklahoma - Jennifer Berry
1st runner-up	(Georgia (U.S. state)) Georgia - Monica Pang
2nd runner-up	Alabama - Alexa Jones
3rd runner-up	Virginia - Kristi Lauren Glakas
4th runner-up	(Washington, D.C.) District of Columbia - Shannon Schambeau
Top 10	Arkansas - Eudora Moseby; Florida - Mari Wilensky; Pennsylvania - Nicole Brewer; South Carolina - Erika Powell; Texas - Morgan Matlock

=== Awards ===
==== Preliminary awards ====
Awards	Contestant
Lifestyle and Fitness	(Washington, D.C.) District of Columbia - Shannon Schambeau; Virginia - Kristi Lauren Glakas; Utah - Julia Bachison
Talent	South Carolina - Erika Grace Powell; Oklahoma - Jennifer Berry; California - Dustin-Leigh Konzelman

==== Quality of Life awards ====
Results	Contestant	Platform
Winner	Idaho - Tracey Brown	Breast Cancer Awareness: Education, Support and Research
1st runner-up	Oklahoma - Jennifer Berry	Building Intolerance to Drunk Driving and Underage Drinking
2nd runner-up	Alabama - Alexa Jones	Arts Education

==== Other awards ====
Awards	Contestant
Miss Congeniality	Hawaii - Malika Dudley
Bernie Wayne Scholarship Award for the Performing Arts	South Carolina - Erika Grace Powell
Non-finalist Talent Awards	California - Dustin-Leigh Konzelman; Delaware - Rebecca Bledsoe; Minnesota - Karyn Stordahl; Tennessee - Tara Burns

== Delegates ==
State	Name	Hometown	Age	Talent	Placement	Awards	Notes^{1}
Alabama	Alexa Jones	Andalusia	24	Ballet en Pointe	2nd runner-up	Quality of Life 2nd runner-up	
Alaska	Rebecca Hayes	Anchorage	24	Ballet en Pointe			
Arizona	Audrey Sibley	Sierra Vista	20	Vocal			
Arkansas	Eudora Moseby	Hazen	23	Vocal	Top 10		
California	Dustin-Leigh Konzelman	Carlsbad	23	Fiddle		Preliminary Talent, Non-finalist Talent	Contestant on The Amazing Race 10 and The Amazing Race 11
Colorado	Jessica Urban	Colorado Springs	24	Vocal & Harp			
Connecticut	Dianna Baitinger	Norwich	23	Vocal			
Delaware	Rebecca Bledsoe	Newark	23	Vocal		Non-finalist Talent	
District of Columbia	Shannon Schambeau	Washington, D.C.	25	Tap Dance	4th runner-up	Preliminary Swimsuit	1st RU at Miss DC USA 2007
Florida	Mari Wilensky	Jacksonville	21	Vocal	Top 10		
Georgia	Monica Pang	Atlanta	25	Piano	1st runner-up		
Hawaii	Malika Dudley	Papaikou	23	Vocal		Miss Congeniality	
Idaho	Tracey Brown	Post Falls	19	Ballet en Pointe			Miss Idaho USA 2008
Illinois	Lauren Allen	Batavia	21	Freestyle Gymnastics			
Indiana	Susan Guilkey	Noblesville	22	Vocal			Later married Micah Beckwith
Iowa	Kay Pauszek	Bettendorf	23	Irish Step Dance			
Kansas	Adrienne Rosel	Liberal	23	Vocal			
Kentucky	Kerri Mitchell	Barbourville	21	Vocal			
Louisiana	Molly Causey	Ruston	22	Piano			
Maine	Megan Beals	Ludlow	22	Vocal			
Maryland	Rachel Ellsworth	Fort Ashby, WV	21	Tap Dance			
Massachusetts	Kristin Gauvin	Worcester	23	Tap Dance			
Michigan	Octavia Reese	Detroit	23	Cello			
Minnesota	Karyn Stordahl	Owatonna	22	Classical Piano		Non-finalist Talent	
Mississippi	Kristian Dambrino	Grenada	20	Piano / Vocal			
Missouri	Stacie Cooley	Liberty	22	Jazz Dance			
Montana	Sophia Steinbeisser	Sidney	21	Tap Dance			
Nebraska	Kelly Keiser	Gothenburg	21	Piano			
Nevada	Crystal Wosik	Las Vegas	23	Lyrical Dance			
New Hampshire	Audra Paquette	Merrimack	24	Lyrical Ballet			Miss New Hampshire USA 2002
New Jersey	Julie Robenhymer	Moorestown	24	Dance			
New Mexico	Ane Cristal Romero	Las Vegas	25	Vocal			
New York	Kandice Pelletier	New York City	24	Musical Theatre Dance			National Sweetheart 2003, Contestant on The Amazing Race 10 and The Amazing Race 11
North Carolina	Brooke McLaurin	Fayetteville	24	Vocal			
North Dakota	Jacqueline Johnson	Fargo	20	Cello			
Ohio	Marlia Fontaine	Massillon	23	Vocal			T10 05
Oklahoma	Jennifer Berry	Tulsa	22	Ballet en Pointe	Winner	Preliminary Talent	
Oregon	Lucy Fleck	Portland	20	Tap Dance			T10 04, NF 05
Pennsylvania	Nicole Brewer	Philadelphia	22	Vocal	Top 10		
Rhode Island	Jessica Samson	Newport	23	Vocal			
South Carolina	Erika Powell	Easley	20	Vocal	Top 10	Preliminary Talent	Miss South Carolina USA 2012
South Dakota	Nikki Grandpre	Pierre	23	Vocal			
Tennessee	Tara Burns	Nashville	22	Classical Vocal		Non-finalist Talent	
Texas	Morgan Matlock	Lamesa	24	Vocal	Top 10		
Utah	Julia Bachison	North Ogden	22	Vocal		Preliminary Swimsuit	Miss Utah USA 2008
Vermont	Megan Plebani	Weybridge	24	Jazz Dance / Gymnastics			
Virginia	Kristi Lauren Glakas	Centreville	24	Vocal	3rd runner-up	Preliminary Swimsuit	Miss Virginia USA 2004
Virgin Islands	Allison Bourne-Vanneck	Saint Thomas	22	Steel Pan			
Washington	Tina Marie Mares	Lynnwood	25	Piano			
West Virginia	Kimberly Goodwin	Morgantown	21	Tap Dance			
Wisconsin	Tracy Gest	Menomonee Falls	20	Piano			
Wyoming	Heather Jackelen	Jackson	24	Acrobatic Dance			Miss Wyoming USA 2001

^{1} Abbrevs: NF = Non-finalist, RU = Runner-up, T = Top, Nat Sweetheart = National Sweetheart (competition for Miss America runners-up)
