= Dustin-Leigh Konzelman =

American model (born 1982)

Dustin-Leigh Fowler
- Born: Dustin-Leigh Konzelman; February 6, 1982 (age 44); Puyallup, Washington, U.S.
- Education: B.A. in Communication Studies, Master of Science in Counseling
- Alma mater: California Baptist University (BA); California State University, Fullerton (MS) (MA)
- Occupations: Marriage and Family Therapist
- Spouses: Luke Seltzer (divorced): Curtis Fowler
- Beauty pageant titleholder
- Title: Miss California 2005
- No. of films: Contestant on The Amazing Race 10 and The Amazing Race: All-Stars
- Hair color: Blonde
- Eye color: Blue
- Major competitions: Miss America 2006 (Unplaced)
- Website: dustinleigh.com

Dustin-Leigh Fowler (née Konzelman; formerly Seltzer; born February 6, 1982), is an American violinist, beauty queen and reality television contestant from Puyallup, Washington who has competed in the Miss America pageant and appeared on the 10th season of The Amazing Race as well as The Amazing Race: All-Stars.

Konzelman, who was homeschooled and is a devout evangelical Christian, graduated magna cum laude from California Baptist University in Riverside, California with a B.A. in communication studies.

== Pageantry ==
Konzelman held the Miss San Diego 2005 title then won the Miss California 2005 title in a state pageant held in mid-2005. She had previously competed for the Miss Washington title, placing second runner-up in 2004 and third runner-up in 2003. Konzelman represented California in the Miss America 2006 pageant, and won a preliminary talent award and a non-finalist talent award for her performance on the fiddle. In 2006, she participated in a European musical tour with the Konzelman Family Band, which includes her parents and five younger brothers.

== The Amazing Race ==
In 2006, Konzelman appeared as a competitor on Season 10 with race partner Miss New York 2005 Kandice Pelletier, finishing in 4th place.

In 2007, Dustin appeared as a competitor on All-Stars with race partner Kandice, finishing in 2nd place.

Dustin and Kandice are considered to be amongst the "25 Most Unforgettable Amazing Race Teams of All Time."

== Professional life ==
Konzelman went on to earn a Master of Science in Counseling from California State University, Fullerton, graduating in 2011. In 2014, she earned a Master of Arts in Clinical Psychology and is completing her doctorate in Clinical Psychology. During her doctoral program she trained in neuropsychology at the Semel Institute for Neuroscience and Human Behavior as well as Cedars-Sinai Medical Center.

Konzelman is a licensed marriage and family therapist practicing in Long Beach, California. She obtained a Master of Science in Counseling from California State University Fullerton, graduating with outstanding honor. Dustin-Leigh consistently attends trainings and pursues education to bring the most cutting-edge research to her practice.

== Personal life ==
Konzelman married in July 2006 after her first appearance on The Amazing Race and changed her name to Seltzer. They divorced after her second appearance on The Amazing Race and she changed her name back. Konzelman now lives in Los Angeles with current husband Curtis Fowler. She has five brothers: Drew, Derek, David, Daniel, and Darien.
