= The Amazing Race 11 =

Season of television series

- Season 11
- Region 1 DVD cover
- Presented by: Phil Keoghan
- No. of teams: 11
- Winners: Eric Sanchez and Danielle Turner
- No. of legs: 13
- Distance traveled: 45,000 mi (72,000 km)
- No. of episodes: 12

Release
- Original network: CBS
- Original release: February 18 – May 6, 2007

Additional information
- Filming dates: November 20 – December 17, 2006

Series chronology
- ← Previous; Season 10 Next → Season 12

The Amazing Race 11 (also known as The Amazing Race: All-Stars) is the eleventh season of the American reality competition show The Amazing Race. Hosted by Phil Keoghan, it featured eleven teams of two, all consisting of individuals from previous seasons of The Amazing Race, competing in a race around the world. This season visited six continents and nine countries, traveling approximately 45,000 miles (72,000 km) over thirteen legs. Filming took place from November 20 to December 17, 2006. Starting in Palmetto Bay, Florida, racers traveled through Ecuador, Chile, Argentina, Mozambique, Tanzania, Poland, Malaysia, Hong Kong, and Macau, before returning to the United States, traveling through Guam and Hawaii, and finishing in San Francisco. The season premiered on CBS on February 18, 2007, and concluded on May 6, 2007.

Dating couple Eric Sanchez and Danielle Turner, who had competed on opposing teams on The Amazing Race 9, were the winners of this season, while beauty queens Dustin Seltzer and Kandice Pelletier from The Amazing Race 10 finished in second place, and cousins Charla Faddoul and Mirna Hindoyan from The Amazing Race 5 finished in third place.

== Format ==
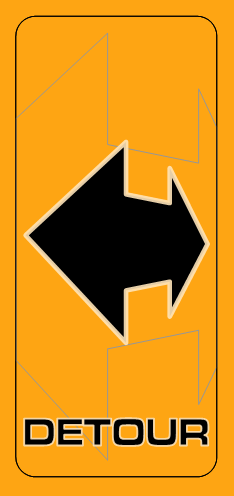
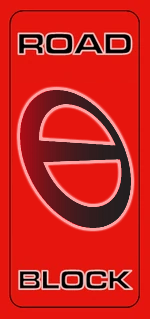
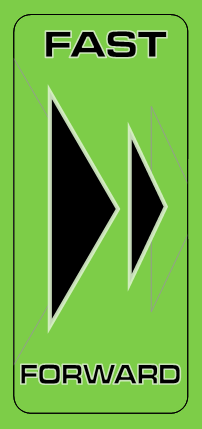
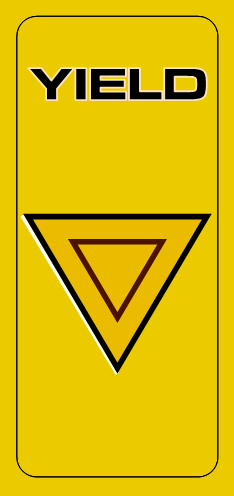
The clues which contestants receive during the course of the race generally fall into five categories: Route Info, Detour, Roadblock, Fast Forward, and Yield.

The Amazing Race is a reality television show created by Bertram van Munster and Elise Doganieri, and hosted by Phil Keoghan. The series follows teams of two competing in a race around the world. Each leg of the race requires teams to deduce clues, navigate foreign environments, interact with locals, perform physical and mental challenges, and travel on a limited budget provided by the show. At each stop during the leg, teams receive clues inside sealed envelopes, which fall into one of these categories:

- Route Info: These are simple instructions that teams must follow before they can receive their next clue.
- Detour: A Detour is a choice between two tasks. Teams may choose either task and switch tasks if they find one option too difficult. There is usually one Detour present on each leg.
- Roadblock: A Roadblock is a task that only one team member can complete. Teams must choose which member will complete the task based on a brief clue they receive before fully learning the details of the task. There is usually one Roadblock present on each leg.
- Fast Forward: A Fast Forward is a task that only one team may complete, which allows that team to skip all remaining tasks on the leg and go directly to the next Pit Stop. Teams may only claim one Fast Forward during the entire race.
- Yield: The Yield allows one team to force another team to stop racing for a predetermined amount of time before they can continue the race. Teams may use the Yield only one time during the entire race.
- Intersection: An Intersection requires two teams to work together until otherwise instructed.

Most teams who arrive last at the Pit Stop of each leg are progressively eliminated, while the first team to arrive at the finish line in the final episode wins the grand prize of US$1,000,000.

== Production ==
=== Development and filming ===
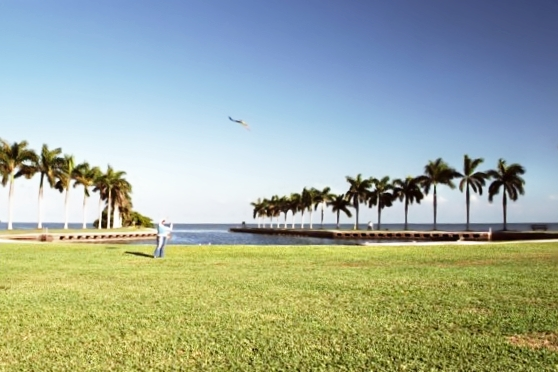
The docks of the Charles Deering Historical Estate, located outside of Miami, was the starting line of The Amazing Race: All-Stars.

As early as 2004, there had been talk about an all-star edition of The Amazing Race, with speculation that it would occur during the eighth season, just as it had with Survivor. These rumors were fueled by reports that season 4 winner Reichen Lehmkuhl had been invited to appear in a future all-star race. Speculation continued for the next few years, particularly after CBS aired all-star editions of their two other reality competition series, Survivor and Big Brother. On September 28, 2006, CBS announced an eleventh season of The Amazing Race. In November 2006, the network officially acknowledged that an all-star edition was in production. Host Phil Keoghan was originally skeptical that an all-star edition was feasible. Over time, Keoghan felt that "as we got more and more really good teams, it just seemed like it had to happen."

This season traveled a little over 45,000 miles (72,000 km), across thirty cities and six continents. Filming took place from November 20 to December 17, 2006. The new locales visited in this season were Ecuador, Mozambique, Poland, Macau, and Guam. This was the last season to feature the Yield until The Amazing Race 32.

=== Casting ===
Host Phil Keoghan personally submitted a list of fifteen teams to the show's production staff that he thought should return; ten of them were chosen. The team Keoghan did not choose was Eric Sanchez and Danielle Turner, who did not previously race together. He said, "I didn't think of that new combination, which actually is a really good one." Keoghan also added that the production team's goal for the race "wasn't to pick the best racers," but "to pick the teams that have earned the most attention over the last ten seasons." Only one team, Uchenna and Joyce Agu, had won their original season, while other seasons' winners criticized CBS' casting process after being omitted, most notably Chip and Kim McAllister (season 5), and B.J. Averell and Tyler MacNiven (season 9).

Colin Guinn and Christie Woods from season 5 were invited to participate, but they declined due to Woods' pregnancy. They later participated on The Amazing Race 31. Flo Pesenti and Drew Riker, who began dating after meeting during season 3, were invited to participate, but Pesenti reportedly declined because she felt the first race had brought out the worst in her, and her season 3 winning partner, Zach Behr, was not invited to join her.

== Release ==
This season introduced the Elimination Station, featured on the official website. A series of thirteen web episodes presented the eliminated contestants living together in a common house in their sequester location in Acapulco, Mexico. The series was viewable only in the United States and was available on the Innertube video streaming service on the CBS website, with a new episode debuting immediately following the airing of each new Amazing Race episode in the Pacific Time Zone.

== Contestants ==
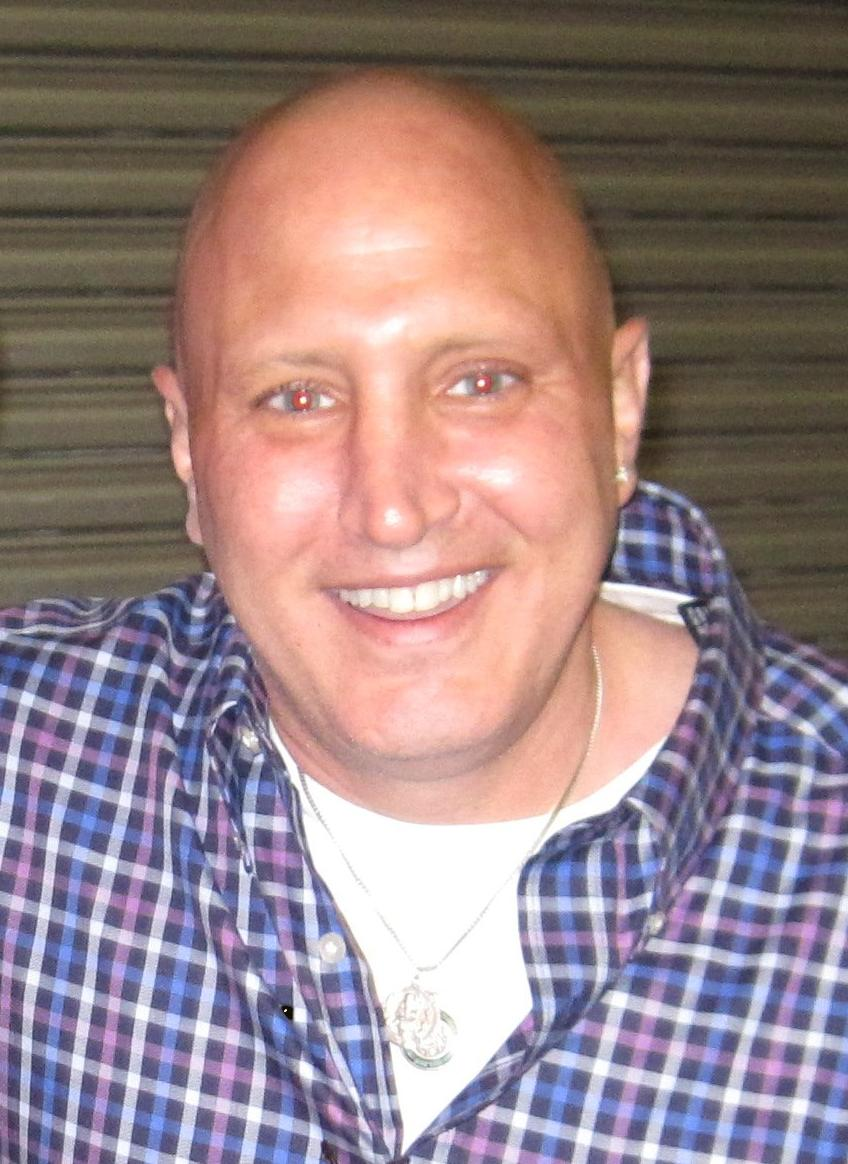
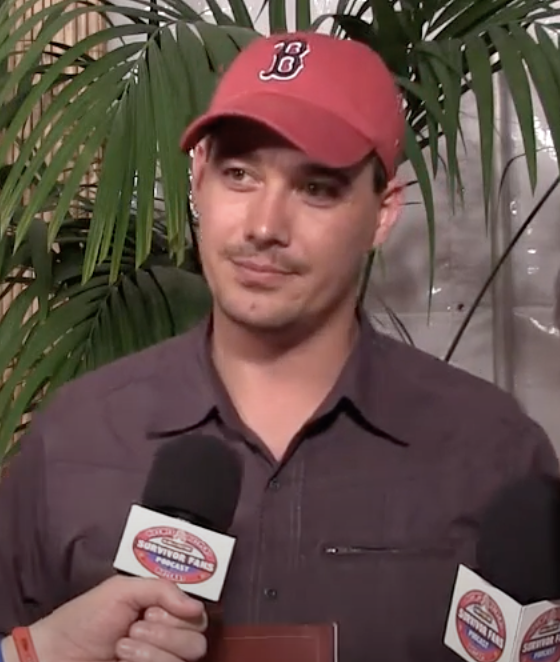
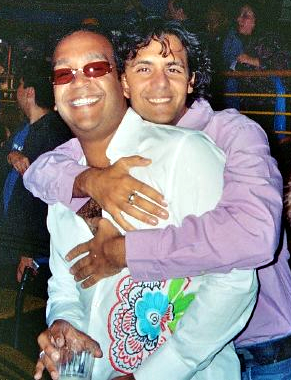
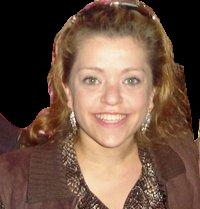
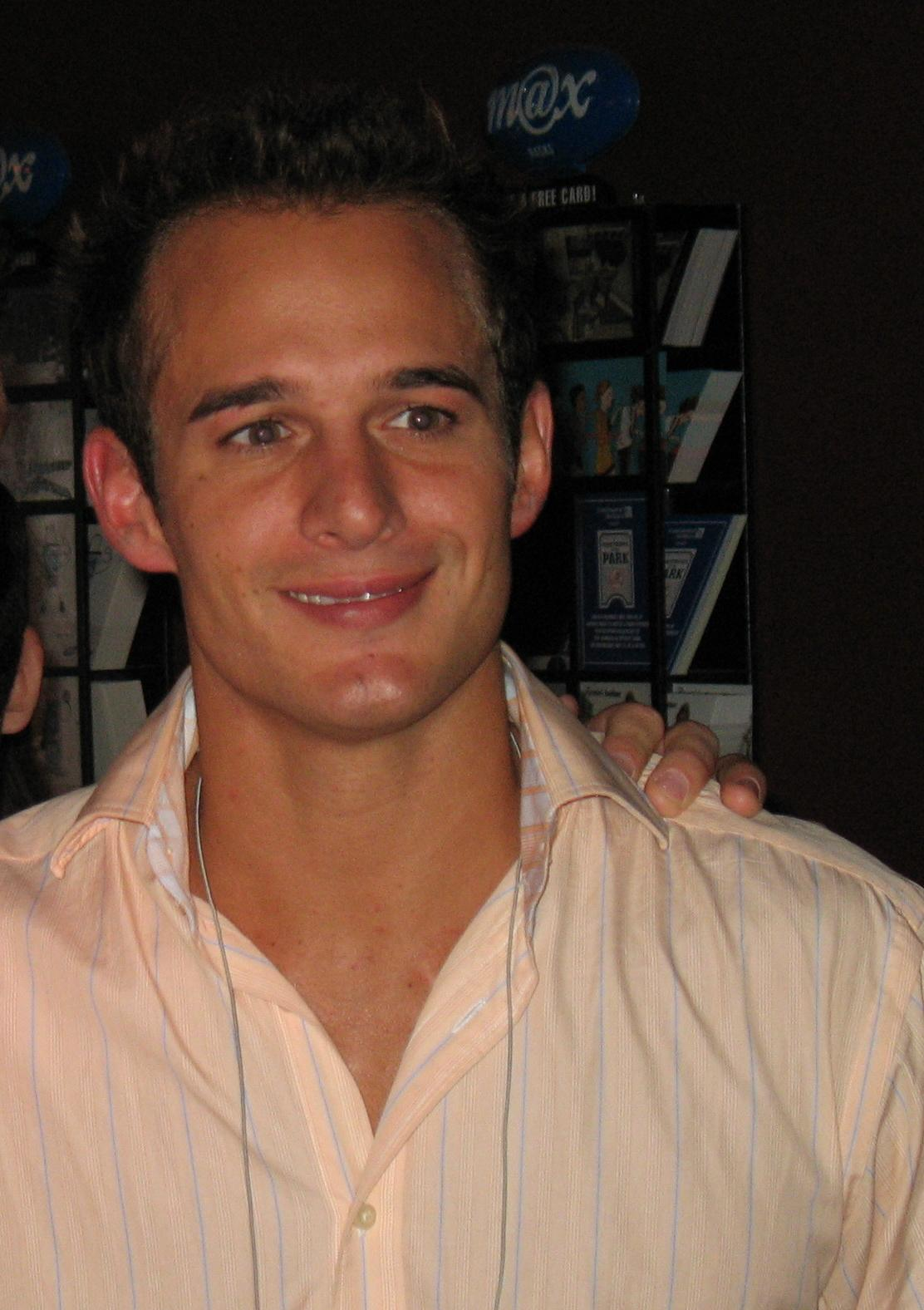
From left to right: Drew Feinberg, Rob Mariano, Oswald Mendez, Danny Jimenez, Charla Faddoul, and Eric Sanchez

The eleven teams were selected from among the first ten seasons. Eric Sanchez and Danielle Turner had met while competing in season 9; Eric had been partnered with his friend Jeremy Ryan, while Danielle had been partnered with her friend Dani Torchio. Rob and Amber Mariano (née Brkich) had gotten married prior to this season.

Contestants	Age	Relationship	Hometown	Status
John Vito Pietanza	32	Formerly Dating; The Amazing Race 3	New York City, New York	Eliminated 1st (in Cotopaxi National Park, Ecuador)
Jill Aquilino	29	Formerly Dating; The Amazing Race 3	New York City, New York	Eliminated 1st (in Cotopaxi National Park, Ecuador)
Kevin O'Connor	40	Lifelong Friends; The Amazing Race 1	Bayonne, New Jersey	Eliminated 2nd (in San Pedro de Atacama, Chile)
Drew Feinberg	41	Lifelong Friends; The Amazing Race 1	Staten Island, New York	Eliminated 2nd (in San Pedro de Atacama, Chile)
David Conley, Jr.	33	Coal Miner & Wife; The Amazing Race 10	Stone, Kentucky	Eliminated 3rd (in Vicente Pérez Rosales National Park, Chile)
Mary Conley	32	Coal Miner & Wife; The Amazing Race 10	Stone, Kentucky	Eliminated 3rd (in Vicente Pérez Rosales National Park, Chile)
Rob Mariano	30	Newlyweds; The Amazing Race 7	Pensacola, Florida	Eliminated 4th (on Isla Redonda, Argentina)
Amber Mariano	28	Newlyweds; The Amazing Race 7	Pensacola, Florida	Eliminated 4th (on Isla Redonda, Argentina)
Teri Pollack	53	Married Parents; The Amazing Race 3	Palm City, Florida	Eliminated 5th (in Zanzibar City, Tanzania)
Ian Pollack	54	Married Parents; The Amazing Race 3	Palm City, Florida	Eliminated 5th (in Zanzibar City, Tanzania)
Joe Baldassare	56	Life Partners; The Amazing Race 1	Laguna Niguel, California	Eliminated 6th (in Sułoszowa, Poland)
Bill Bartek	53	Life Partners; The Amazing Race 1	Laguna Niguel, California	Eliminated 6th (in Sułoszowa, Poland)
Uchenna Agu	42	Married; The Amazing Race 7	Houston, Texas	Eliminated 7th (in Kuala Lumpur, Malaysia)
Joyce Agu	46	Married; The Amazing Race 7	Houston, Texas	Eliminated 7th (in Kuala Lumpur, Malaysia)
Oswald Mendez	36	Best Friends; The Amazing Race 2	New York City, New York	Eliminated 8th (in Humåtak, Guam)
Danny Jimenez	41	Best Friends; The Amazing Race 2	Miami, Florida	Eliminated 8th (in Humåtak, Guam)
Charla Faddoul	30	Cousins; The Amazing Race 5	Towson, Maryland	Third place
Mirna Hindoyan	30	Cousins; The Amazing Race 5	Towson, Maryland	Third place
Dustin Seltzer	24	Beauty Queens; The Amazing Race 10	Seattle, Washington	Runners-up
Kandice Pelletier	25	Beauty Queens; The Amazing Race 10	New York City, New York	Runners-up
Eric Sanchez	28	Dating; The Amazing Race 9	Deerfield Beach, Florida	Winners
Danielle Turner	23	Dating; The Amazing Race 9	Staten Island, New York	Winners

Future appearances

Uchenna and Joyce and Charla and Mirna appeared on The Amazing Race: 25 Years Around the World.

Rob Mariano went on to compete on Survivor: Heroes vs. Villains, Survivor: Redemption Island, and participated as a non-competing mentor on Survivor: Island of the Idols. The Marianos both returned to Survivor to compete on Survivor: Winners at War. On May 23, 2016, Rob Mariano appeared on a Survivor-themed primetime special episode of The Price Is Right. In 2024, he competed on Deal or No Deal Island. Later in the year, he competed on the third season of The Traitors.

== Results ==
The following teams are listed with their placements in each leg. Placements are listed in finishing order.

- A red placement with a dagger (†) indicates that the team was eliminated.
- An underlined blue placement with a double-dagger (‡) indicates that the team was the last to arrive at a Pit Stop in a non-elimination leg, and was "marked for elimination" in the following leg. (Note: A team that is "marked for elimination" must check in at the Pit Stop in first place; otherwise they would receive a 30-minute penalty.)
- A green ƒ indicates that the team won the Fast Forward.
- A brown > indicates that the team used the Yield and a brown < indicates the team on the receiving end of the Yield.
- A violet + indicates that the teams encountered an Intersection.

Team placement (by leg)
Team	1	2	3	4	5	6	7	8+ (Note: This leg featured an Intersection. The teams were paired up thusly: Eric and Danielle and Joe and Bill, Dustin and Kandice and Charla and Mirna, and Oswald and Danny and Uchenna and Joyce.)	9	10	11	12	13
Eric & Danielle	4th	4th	3rd	2nd	6th	5th	5th	5th	3rd< (Note: Dustin and Kandice chose to Yield Eric and Danielle.)	4th‡	3rd< (Note: Oswald and Danny chose to Yield Eric and Danielle.) (Note: Eric and Danielle initially arrived 2nd, but were issued a 30-minute penalty for being "marked for elimination" and not arriving 1st. Charla and Mirna checked in during this penalty time, dropping Eric and Danielle to 3rd.)	2nd	1st
Dustin & Kandice	6th	6th	4th	5th	2nd	4th	1st	3rd	1st>	2nd	1st	1st	2nd
Charla & Mirna	8th	8th	8th	7th	1st	1st	4th	4th	2nd	3rd	2nd	3rd	3rd
Oswald & Danny	2nd	2nd	5th	1st	4th	2nd	2nd	1stƒ	4th	1stƒ	4th‡>	4th†	
Uchenna & Joyce	7th	5th	2nd	6th	7th‡	3rd	3rd	1stƒ	5th†				
Joe & Bill	5th	3rd	7th	4th	5th	6th	6th‡	6th† (Note: Joe and Bill initially arrived 5th, but were issued a 30-minute penalty for being "marked for elimination" and not arriving 1st. Eric and Danielle checked in during this penalty time, dropping Joe and Bill to last.)					
Teri & Ian	3rd	7th	6th	3rd	3rd	7th†							
Rob & Amber	1st	1st	1st	8th†									
David & Mary	9th	9th	9th†										
Kevin & Drew	10th	10th†											
John Vito & Jill	11th†												

== Race summary ==
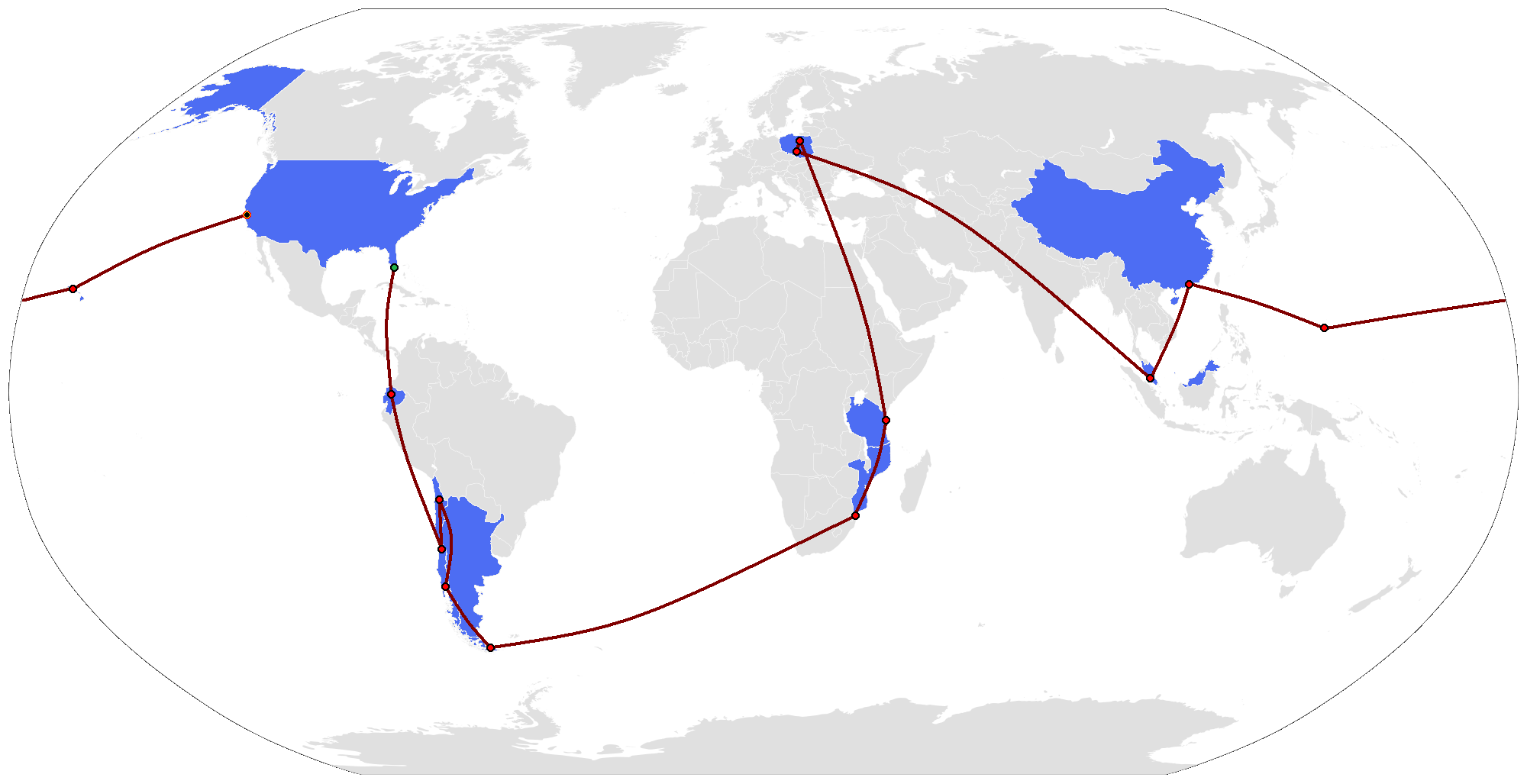
The route of The Amazing Race 11.

Destinations	Air travel Rail travel Water travel Bus travel Helicopter travel Bicycle travel Gondola travel
Route Markers	Detour Roadblock Fast Forward Yield Intersection Pit Stop

=== Leg 1 (United States → Ecuador) ===
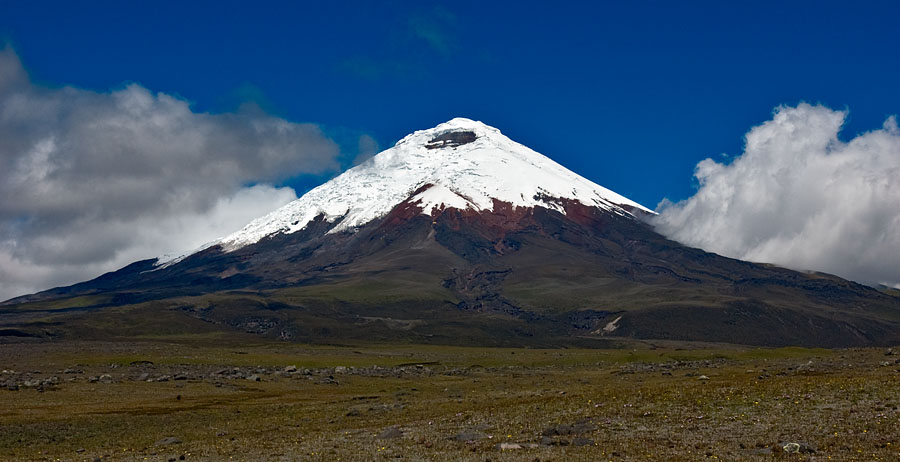
The Cotopaxi volcano in Ecuador was the locale of the Detour and the Pit Stop of the first leg.

- Episode 1: "I Told You Less Martinis and More Cardio" (February 18, 2007)
- Prize: A trip to Whistler, British Columbia (awarded to Rob and Amber)
- Eliminated: John Vito and Jill

Locations

- Palmetto Bay, Florida (Charles Deering Estate) (Starting Line)
- Miami (Miami International Airport) → Quito, Ecuador
- Quito (Plaza de San Francisco)
- Quito (Pim's Restaurant)
- Cotopaxi National Park (Hacienda Yanahurco)
- Cotopaxi National Park (Mirador Cotopaxi)

Episode summary

- Teams set off from the Charles Deering Estate in Palmetto Bay, Florida, and had to drive to Miami International Airport and book one of two flights to Quito, Ecuador. Once there, teams had to travel to Plaza de San Francisco to find their next clue, which sent them to Pim's Restaurant. There, teams had to choose one of three departure times.
- The next morning, teams were provided a map and had to drive themselves to Hacienda Yanahurco at Cotopaxi National Park, where they found their next clue.
- This season's first Detour was a choice between Wrangle It or Recover It. In Wrangle It, teams had to help local cowboys lasso, tie down, and groom one wild horse. Team members had to clip its hooves and trim its mane and tail. In Recover It, one team member would have had to put on a historical military uniform and then search a field for three items missing from the uniform (an epaulette, a button, and a sword) in order to receive their next clue. All teams chose Wrangle It.
- After the Detour, teams had to check in at the Pit Stop: Mirador Cotopaxi.

=== Leg 2 (Ecuador → Chile) ===
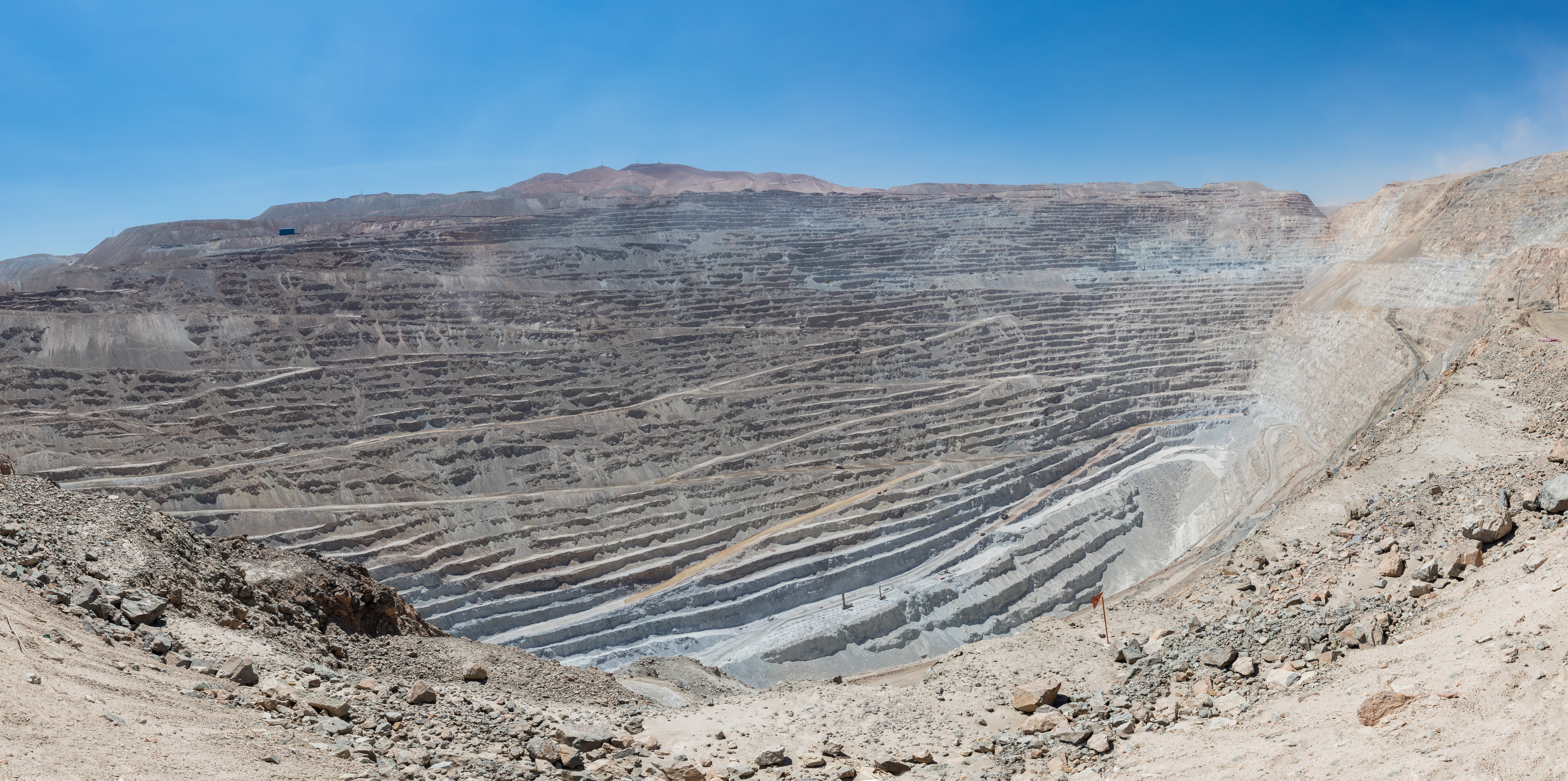
The Detour in Chile took place at the Chuquicamata copper mine.

- Episode 2: "Beauty Is Sometimes Skin Deep" (February 25, 2007)
- Prize: An off-road motorcycle for each member (awarded to Rob and Amber)
- Eliminated: Kevin and Drew

Locations

- Cotopaxi National Park (Mirador Cotopaxi)
- Quito → Santiago, Chile
- Santiago (Codelco Corporate Headquarters)
- Santiago → Calama
- Calama (Chuquicamata)
- San Pedro de Atacama (Valley of the Dead)

Episode summary

- At the start of this leg, teams were instructed to fly to Santiago, Chile. Once there, teams had to travel to the Codelco corporate headquarters to find their next clue.
- In this season's first Roadblock, one team member had to enter the Codelco headquarters and search the boardroom for letters of the alphabet. They had to figure out that the letters, when unscrambled, spelled one of the ten destinations inscribed on the plaques hanging on the wall. When they believed they had the solution – Chuquicamata – they had to show their answer to the security guard. If they were correct, he handed them their next clue.
- After the Roadblock, teams were instructed to fly to Calama and then travel to the Chuquicamata copper mine.
- This leg's Detour was a choice between By Hand or By Machine. In By Hand, teams had to choose a two-ton tire and finish securing it to a dump truck in order to receive their next clue. In By Machine, each team member had to take turns driving a front loader to transfer enough gravel to cover a yellow line, at which point they received their next clue.
- After the Detour, teams had to drive to the Pit Stop: the Valley of the Dead in San Pedro de Atacama.

=== Leg 3 (Chile) ===
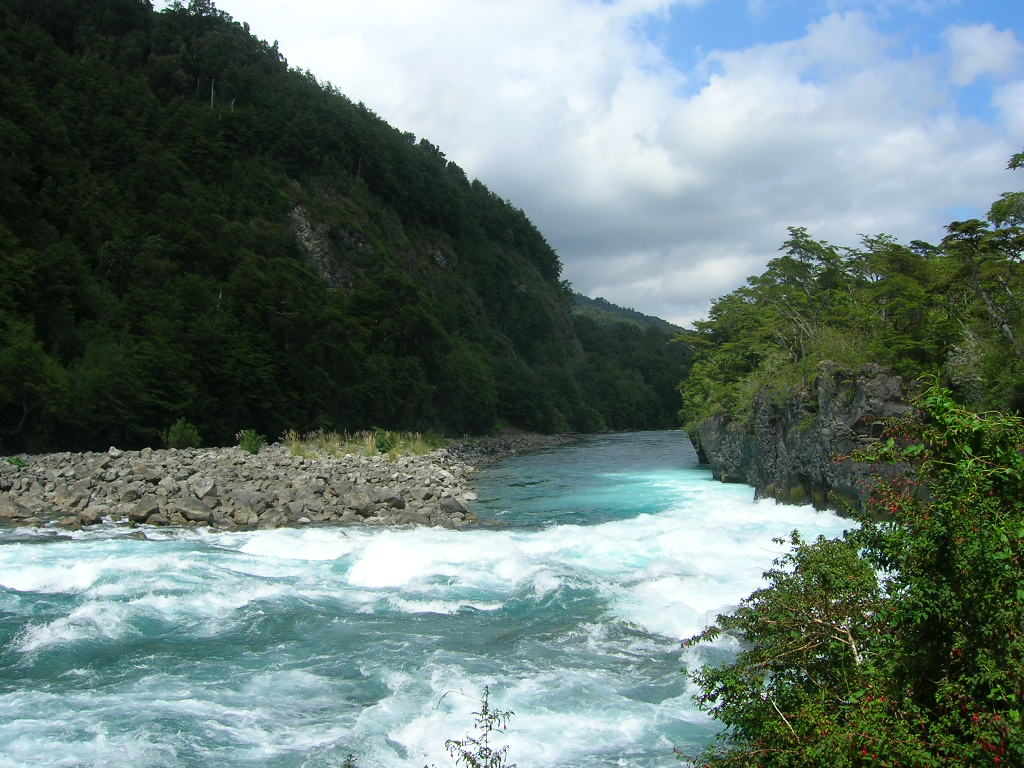
The Petrohué River in Chile's Los Lagos Region was the site of this leg's Detour.

- Episode 3: "I'm Sorry I'm Wearing a Bathing Suit. It Is Very Weird, I Know" (March 4, 2007)
- Prize: A home gym for each member (awarded to Rob and Amber)
- Eliminated: David and Mary

Locations

- San Pedro de Atacama (Valley of the Dead)
- San Pedro de Atacama (Church of San Pedro de Atacama)
- Calama → Puerto Montt
- Metri (University of Los Lagos – Centro Acuicultura y Ciencias del Mar)
- Vicente Pérez Rosales National Park (Petrohué River – La Maquina)
- Vicente Pérez Rosales National Park (Playa Petrohué)

Episode summary

- At the start of this leg, teams had to drive to the Church of San Pedro de Atacama to find their next clue, which instructed them to fly to Puerto Montt. Once there, teams had to drive to the Centro Acuicultura y Ciencias del Mar at the University of Los Lagos to find their next clue.
- In this leg's Roadblock, one team member had to choose an 1,800-US-gallon (6,800 L; 1,500 imp gal) fish-breeding tank, jump in, and catch and transfer all 80 flounder to a holding tank at the other end of the farm. Once finished, their clue was revealed at the bottom of the tank.
- After the Roadblock, teams had to drive to La Maquina and find their next clue along the Petrohué River.
- This leg's Detour was a choice between Vertical Limit or River Wild. In Vertical Limit, teams would have had to complete a 40-foot (12 m) rock climb, where each team member would have had to grab half of their clue at the top. In River Wild, teams had to backtrack two miles (3.2 km) to the banks of the Petrohué River, where they had to complete a two-point-five-mile (4 km) whitewater-rafting course through levels 3 and 4 rapids. After the course, teams received their next clue. All teams chose River Wild.
- After the Detour, teams had to check in at the Pit Stop: Playa Petrohué.

=== Leg 4 (Chile → Argentina) ===
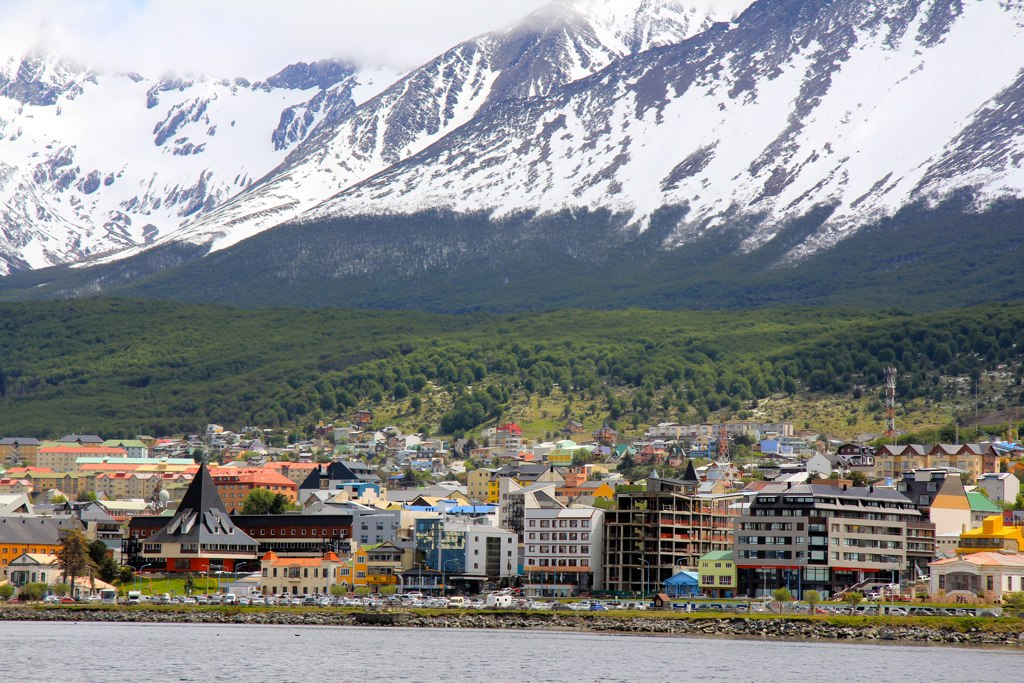
Teams visited Ushuaia, Argentina, one of the southernmost cities in the world, on this leg.

- Episode 4: "No Babies on The Race!" (March 11, 2007)
- Prize: A trip to Maui (awarded to Oswald and Danny)
- Eliminated: Rob and Amber

Locations

- Vicente Pérez Rosales National Park (Playa Petrohué)
- Puerto Montt → Punta Arenas
- Punta Arenas (Lord Lonsdale Shipwreck)
- Punta Arenas (Plaza Muñoz Gamero & Nautilus or Mirador Cerro de la Cruz)
- Punta Arenas (Presidente Carlos Ibáñez del Campo International Airport) → Ushuaia, Argentina
- Ushuaia (Playa Larga)
- Ushuaia (Bahia Lapataia) → Isla Redonda (Unidad Postal Fin del Mundo Post Office)
- Isla Redonda (Mástil de Crucero ARA General Belgrano)

Episode summary

- At the start of this leg, teams were instructed to fly to Punta Arenas. Once there, teams had to find the Lord Lonsdale shipwreck and locate the clue nearby.
- This leg's Detour was a choice between Navigate It or Sign It. In Navigate It, teams had to use a map of Punta Arenas to find the Plaza Muñoz Gamero, where a sailor gave them a compass. Using the compass, teams had to walk directly south to the Nautilus, a deep-sea salvage business, to receive their next clue. In Sign It, teams had to choose a pole and building supplies and carry them up a flight of stairs to Ferdinand Magellan's map. Using the map as a reference, teams had to determine that Magellan's circumnavigation of the world began and ended in Seville, Spain. They then had to build a traditional local signpost listing in order the fourteen ports-of-call of his voyage. Once completed correctly, they received their next clue.
- After the Detour, teams had to travel to the airport and sign up for one of two charter flights departing the next morning to Ushuaia, Argentina, one of the southernmost cities in the world. Once there, teams had to travel to Playa Larga, where they found their next clue. Teams then had to travel to Bahia Lapataia in the Tierra del Fuego National Park, where they took a number for a boat to Isla Redonda.
- In this leg's Roadblock, one team member had to search through 1,600 pieces of mail to find one of two letters addressed to their team, which were written by teams from their previous season. They then had to read the letter aloud to their partner, at which point they received their next clue directing them to the Pit Stop: the mast of the ARA General Belgrano on Isla Redonda.

=== Leg 5 (Argentina → Mozambique) ===
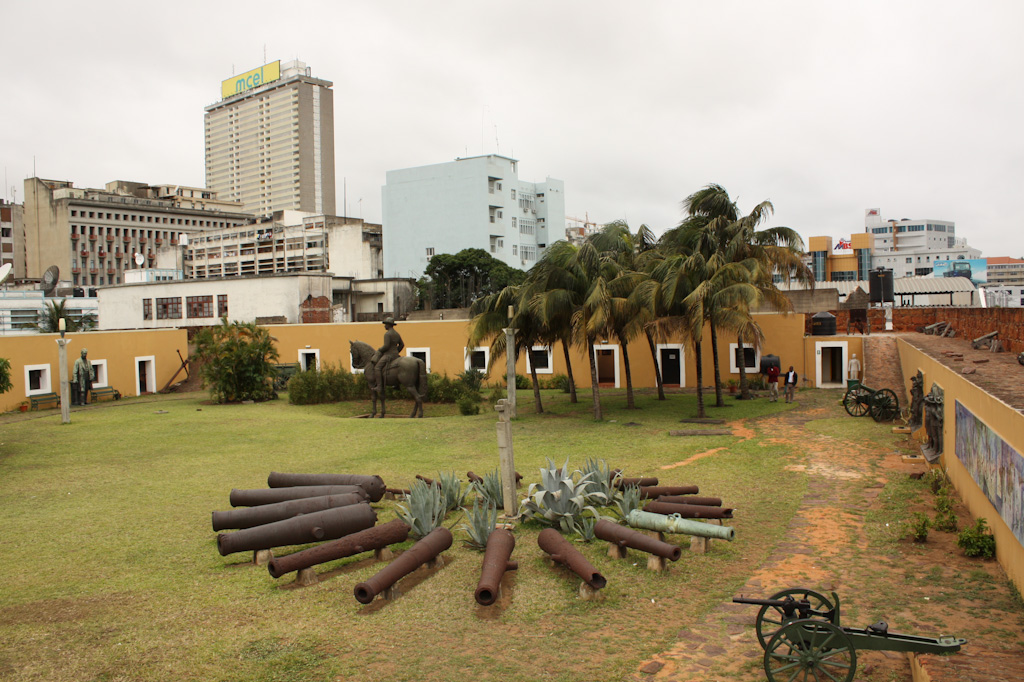
The Fortaleza de Maputo was the Pit Stop in Mozambique.

- Episode 5: "You Need to Watch Your Jokes, Guy" (March 18, 2007)
- Prize: A trip to Aruba (awarded to Charla and Mirna)

Locations

- Isla Redonda (Mástil de Crucero ARA General Belgrano)
- Ushuaia (Martial Glacier)
- Ushuaia → Maputo, Mozambique
- Bilene (Apopo Training Field)
- Maputo (Praça dos Trabalhadores)
- Maputo (Maputo Central Market or Mercado Janet)
- Maputo (Fortaleza de Maputo)

Episode summary

- At the start of this leg, teams had to ride a chair lift, pick up equipment, and hike one-half mile (0.80 km) to the Martial Glacier, where they had to use an avalanche beacon to search for another beacon buried in the snow along with their next clue. Teams were then instructed to fly to Maputo, Mozambique. Once there, teams had to travel to the Apopo Training Field in Bilene to find their next clue.
- In this leg's Roadblock, one team member had to guide a rat to find an Amazing Race flag above a deactivated landmine. Once their rat gave the signal that it had found something, a mine technician searched the area, and if they dug up the flag, the team received their next clue.
- After the Roadblock, teams had to travel to the Praça dos Trabalhadores to find their next clue.
- This leg's Detour was a choice between Pamper or Porter. In Pamper, teams had to travel one-half mile (0.80 km) to the Maputo Central Market, choose a nail-polish kit, and convince people to pay them to paint their nails until they earned at least 30MT (roughly $1) in order to receive their next clue. In Porter, teams had to travel two miles (3.2 km) to Mercado Janet, where they used their bare hands to fill ten 45-pound (20 kg) bags with coal and then sew them shut. Teams then had to carry one of the bags to a specified address, where the owner handed them their next clue.
- After the Detour, teams had to check in at the Pit Stop: the Fortaleza de Maputo.

Additional notes

- Teams were provided tickets for a flight to Maputo, but they were under no obligation to use them.
- This was a non-elimination leg.

=== Leg 6 (Mozambique → Tanzania) ===
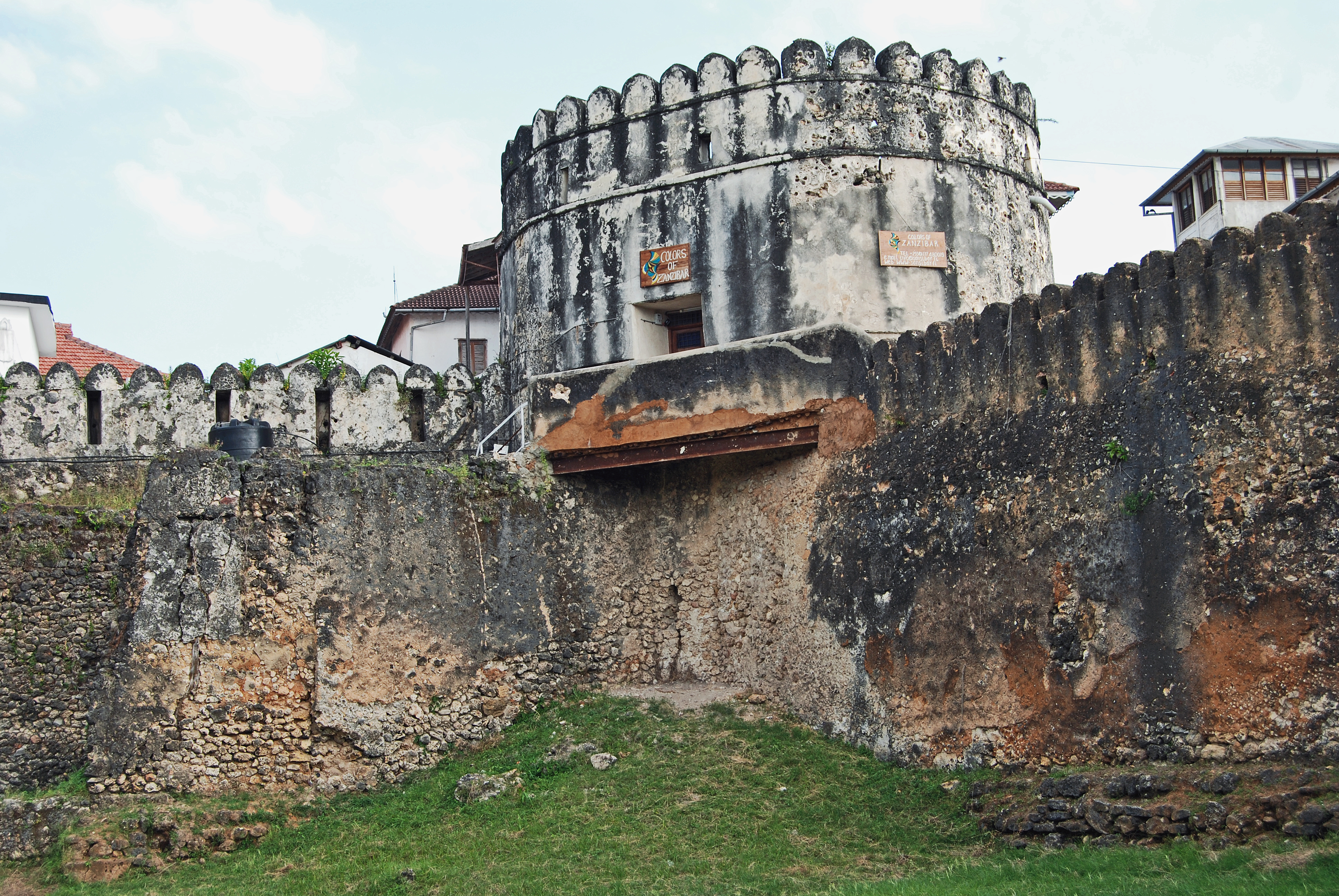
Teams ended the leg in Zanzibar at the famous Old Fort in Stone Town.

- Episode 6: "We're Going to Trade You for Food Now" (March 25, 2007)
- Prize: A catamaran for each team member (awarded to Charla and Mirna)
- Eliminated: Teri and Ian

Locations

- Maputo (Fortaleza de Maputo)
- Maputo → Dar es Salaam, Tanzania
- Dar es Salaam (Ferry Terminal) → Zanzibar City
- Zanzibar City (Kiosk)
- Zanzibar City (Stone Town – Beyt al Chai Hotel or Kijangwani – Kijangwani Lumber Yard)
- Kikungwi (Maasai Village)
- Zanzibar City (Stone Town – Old Fort of Zanzibar)

Episode summary

- At the start of this leg, teams were instructed to fly to Dar es Salaam, Tanzania. At the ferry terminal in Dar es Salaam, teams had to take a number for one of four dhows to Zanzibar, where they searched for a nearby kiosk that had their next clue.
- This leg's Detour was a choice between Solve It or Schlep It. In Solve It, teams had to travel one-third mile (0.54 km) to the Beyt al Chai hotel in Stone Town, where they had to assemble a 62-piece puzzle of an image from the tinga tinga style of local artwork in order to receive their next clue. In Schlep It, teams had to travel one mile (1.6 km) to the Kijangwani Lumber Yard. Once there, teams had to choose a handcart, load two 50-pound (23 kg) logs, and then deliver them more than one mile (1.6 km) to a dhow shipyard in order to receive their next clue.
- After the Detour, teams had to travel to the Maasai Village in Kikungwi to find their next clue.
- In this leg's Roadblock, one team member had to throw a traditional Maasai wooden weapon called a rungu 65 feet (20 m) at a clay target hard enough in order to shatter it and reveal their next clue, which directed them to the Pit Stop: the Old Fort of Zanzibar in Zanzibar City.

=== Leg 7 (Tanzania → Poland) ===
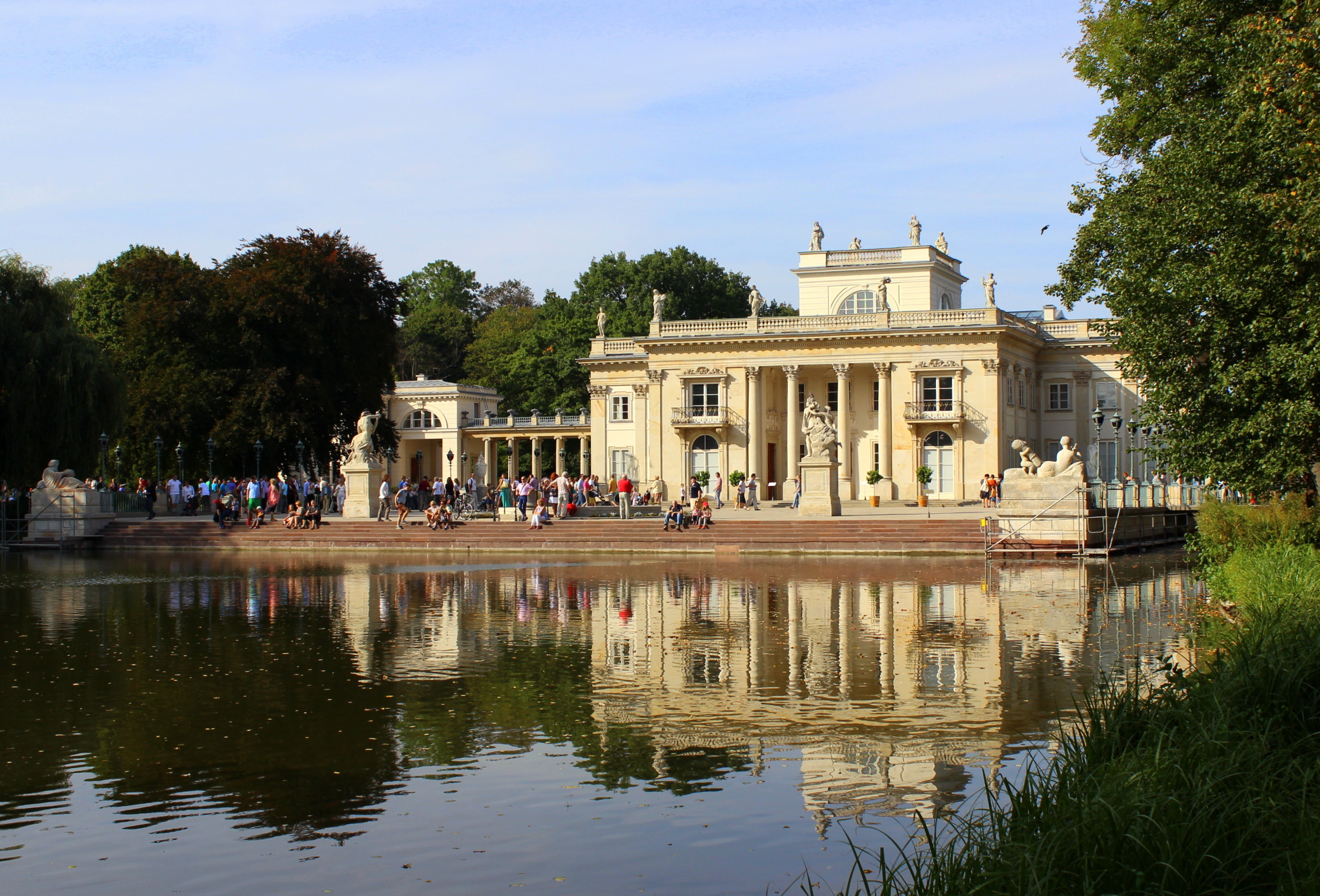
Teams finished this leg at Warsaw's Łazienki Palace, overlooking the reflection pool.

- Episode 7: "If I Were in Town, I'd Ask for Your Number - Part 1" (April 1, 2007)
- Prize: A trip to Puerto Rico (awarded to Dustin and Kandice)

Locations

- Zanzibar City (Stone Town – Old Fort of Zanzibar)
- Zanzibar City → Warsaw, Poland
- Warsaw (Czapski Palace)
- Warsaw (Prymas Palace or Escada Boutique and Panoramik Laboratory)
- Warsaw (Łazienki Park – Statue of Jan III Sobieski)
- Warsaw (Łazienki Palace)

Episode summary

- At the start of this leg, teams were instructed to fly to Warsaw, Poland. Once there, teams had to travel to Czapski Palace and find their next clue near a Frédéric Chopin impersonator.
- This leg's Detour was a choice between Perfect Pitch or Perfect Angle. In Perfect Pitch, which honored Frédéric Chopin, teams had to travel three-quarters mile (1.2 km) to the Prymas Palace, where they had to use provided tools to tune the one key of a grand piano that they determined was out of tune. Once a concert pianist played a piece of Chopin's music and determined that their piano was in tune, they received their next clue. In Perfect Angle, which honored Marie Curie, teams traveled approximately one-half mile (0.80 km) to the Escada Boutique, selected a mannequin, and carried it another 400 yards (370 m) to the Panoramik Laboratory. There, teams used an x-ray machine to locate a clue embedded inside the mannequin, which had to be positioned at a very specific angle in order for the image to show the name of their next destination.
- After the Detour, teams either received a piece of sheet music or an x-ray film, from which they had to determine that their next location was the statue of Jan III Sobieski at Łazienki Park, where they found their next clue.
- Teams had to check in at the Pit Stop: Łazienki Palace.

Additional notes

- Due to limited availability of flights from Zanzibar to Warsaw, teams were provided tickets for a flight, but they were under no obligation to use them.
- This was a non-elimination leg.

=== Leg 8 (Poland) ===
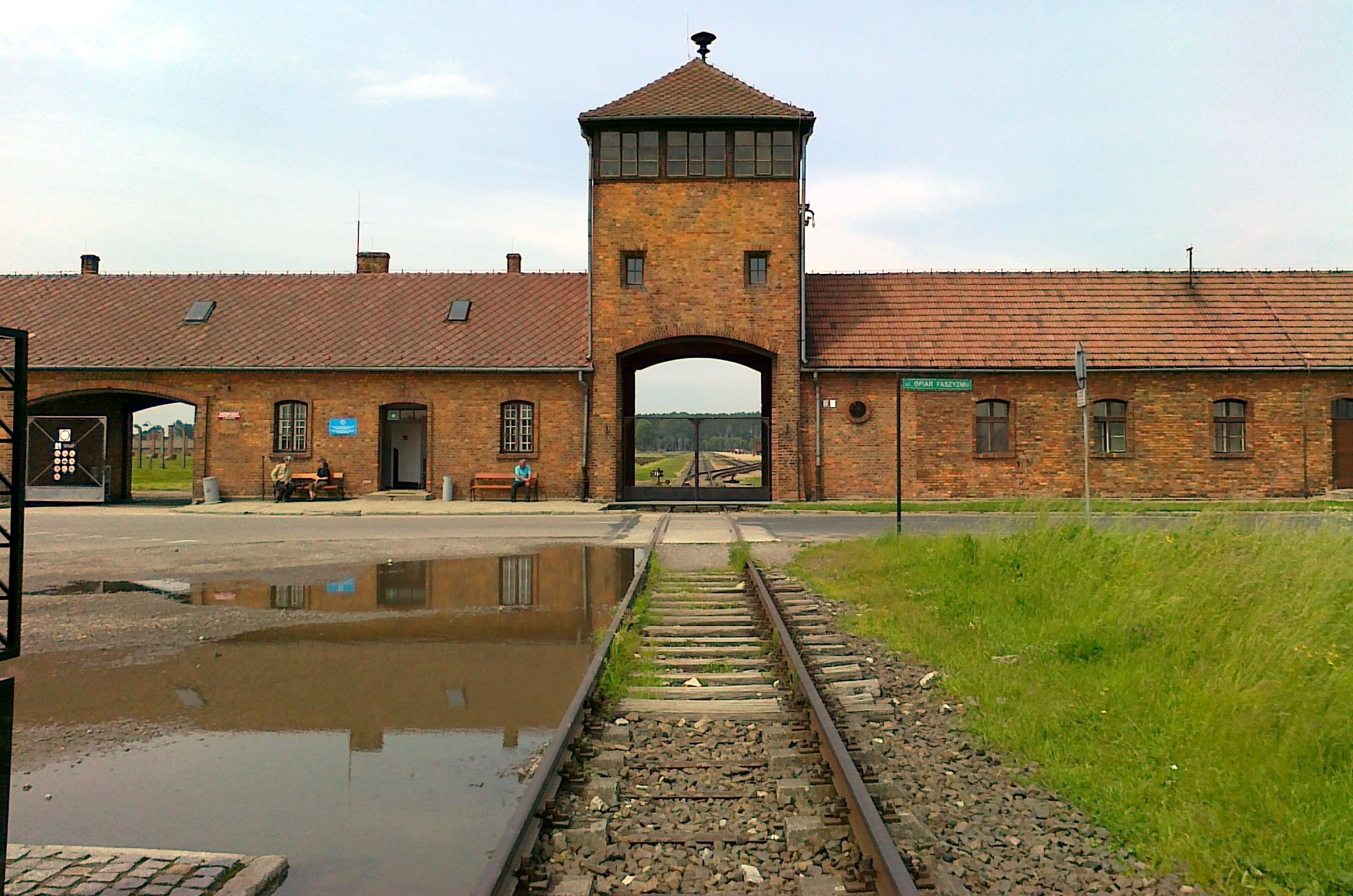
In Poland, teams visited the Auschwitz concentration camp and paid tribute to those killed during the Holocaust.

- Episode 8: "If I Were in Town, I'd Ask for Your Number - Part 2" (April 1, 2007)
- Prize: A trip to Saint Lucia (awarded to Uchenna and Joyce)
- Eliminated: Joe and Bill

Locations

- Warsaw (Łazienki Palace)
- Warsaw (Monument to the Polish Underground State and Home Army) → Oświęcim (Auschwitz-Birkenau)
- Kraków (Juliusz Słowacki Theatre)
- Kraków (Main Market Square – Fire Guard Tower & Town Hall Tower)
- Kraków (Okrąglak or Old Jewish Quarter – J. Mazurek Bakery & Klezmer-Hois)
- Sułoszowa (Pieskowa Skała)

Episode summary

- At the start of this leg, teams were instructed to find to the Monument to the Polish Underground State and Home Army and choose tickets for one of two charter buses to Auschwitz-Birkenau. There, teams had to light a memorial candle on the railroad tracks to honor all those who were killed during the Holocaust. After observing a memorial silence, teams received their next clue, which directed them to the Juliusz Słowacki Theatre in Kraków.
- At the theater, teams encountered an Intersection, where teams were required to work together in pairs to complete tasks until further notice. The teams were paired up thusly: Eric and Danielle and Joe and Bill, Dustin and Kandice and Charla and Mirna, and Oswald and Danny and Uchenna and Joyce.
- In this season's first Fast Forward, one pair of newly-joined teams had to climb the stairs of the fire guard tower of St. Mary's Basilica and the Town Hall Tower. They had to count the total number of stairs and present the sum to a guard atop the fire guard tower. Oswald and Danny and Uchenna and Joyce won the Fast Forward.
- This leg's Detour was a choice between Eat It Up or Roll It Out. In Eat It Up, the newly-joined teams had to travel one point five miles (2.4 km) to an old market, where they had to make a three-inch (7.6 cm) length of Polish kiełbasa sausage. The teams were then served eight feet (2.4 m) of cooked kiełbasa, and each person had to eat two feet (0.61 m) of sausage in order to receive their next clue. In Roll It Out, the teams had to travel one point five miles (2.4 km) to the J. Mazurek bakery in the Old Jewish Quarter and properly roll out twenty bagels. When finished, they had to carry a delivery of fresh bagels one-quarter mile (0.40 km) to Klezmer Hois, where they received their next clue. Once teams completed the Detour, they were no longer joined together.
- After the Detour, teams had to drive themselves to Pieskowa Skała in Sułoszowa.
- In this leg's Roadblock, one team member had to don a full suit of medieval armor and then lead a horse a one-half mile (0.80 km) through the forest to the castle gates. Once at the castle, they had to deliver the horse to the stable boy, enter the courtyard, and search for the nearby Pit Stop.

Additional notes

- Two teams arrived in first place due to collaboration on the Fast Forward during the Intersection. There was only one prize offered, however; Oswald and Danny conceded the prize to Uchenna and Joyce.
- Legs 7 and 8 aired back-to-back as a special two-hour episode.

=== Leg 9 (Poland → Malaysia) ===
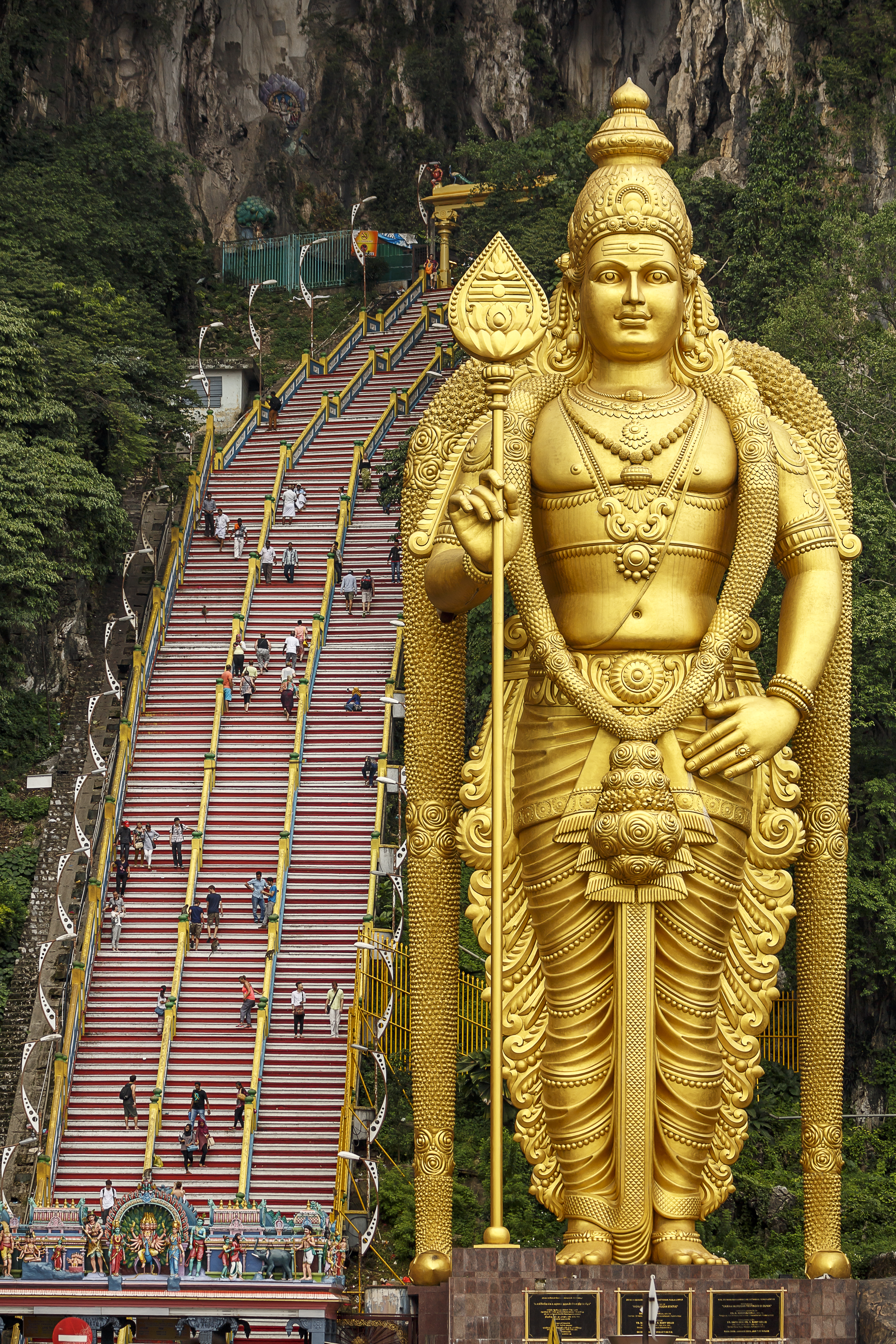
Once in Malaysia, teams had to climb up several steps on the stairs of the famous Batu Caves for their clue.

- Episode 9: "The Way You Look, Yeah" (April 8, 2007)
- Prize: A retro-scooter for each team member (awarded to Dustin and Kandice)
- Eliminated: Uchenna and Joyce

Locations

- Sułoszowa (Pieskowa Skała)
- Kraków → Kuala Lumpur, Malaysia
- Kuala Lumpur → Gombak (Batu Caves)
- Kuala Lumpur (Kampung Baru – Kampung Baru Mosque)
- Kuala Lumpur (Dewan Lama or Chow Kit Bomba)
- Kuala Lumpur (Taman Sri Hartamas)
- Kuala Lumpur (Carcosa Seri Negara)

Episode summary

- At the start of this leg, teams were instructed to fly to Kuala Lumpur, Malaysia. Once there, teams had to travel to the Batu Caves, where they had to climb the steps and search for their next clue. Teams then had to travel to the Kampung Baru Mosque and search a nearby footbridge for their next clue.
- This leg's Detour was a choice between Artistic Expression or Cookie Confection. In Artistic Expression, teams had to travel on foot to Dewan Lama, where they had to use a traditional technique known as batik to duplicate one of three patterns onto a 45-square-foot (4 m^{2}) piece of cloth. Then they had to dye the cloth to the satisfaction of the artisan in order to receive their next clue. In Cookie Confection, teams had to travel on foot to Chow Kit Bomba and search through 600 boxes of traditional Malaysian festive cookies by biting into each cookie until they found one with a black licorice center in order to receive their next clue.
- After the Detour, teams had to travel to the neighborhood of Taman Sri Hartamas and search for their next clue by a newspaper vendor with a delivery truck.
- In this leg's Roadblock, one team member had to participate in a local practice called karung guni by pedaling a bicycle with an attached side cart and asking residents to give them used newspapers to recycle. Once racers collected enough newspaper to make a stack approximately six feet (1.8 m) high, they received their next clue directing them to the Pit Stop: Carcosa Seri Negara.

Additional notes

- Dustin and Kandice chose to Yield Eric and Danielle.
- Uchenna and Joyce missed a connecting flight in Frankfurt, Germany, and did not arrive in Kuala Lumpur until roughly eight hours after all of the other teams. Although they were not shown performing any tasks, Joyce confirmed in an interview that they performed all of the leg's tasks, including the cookie Detour and the newspaper recycling Roadblock.

=== Leg 10 (Malaysia → Hong Kong) ===
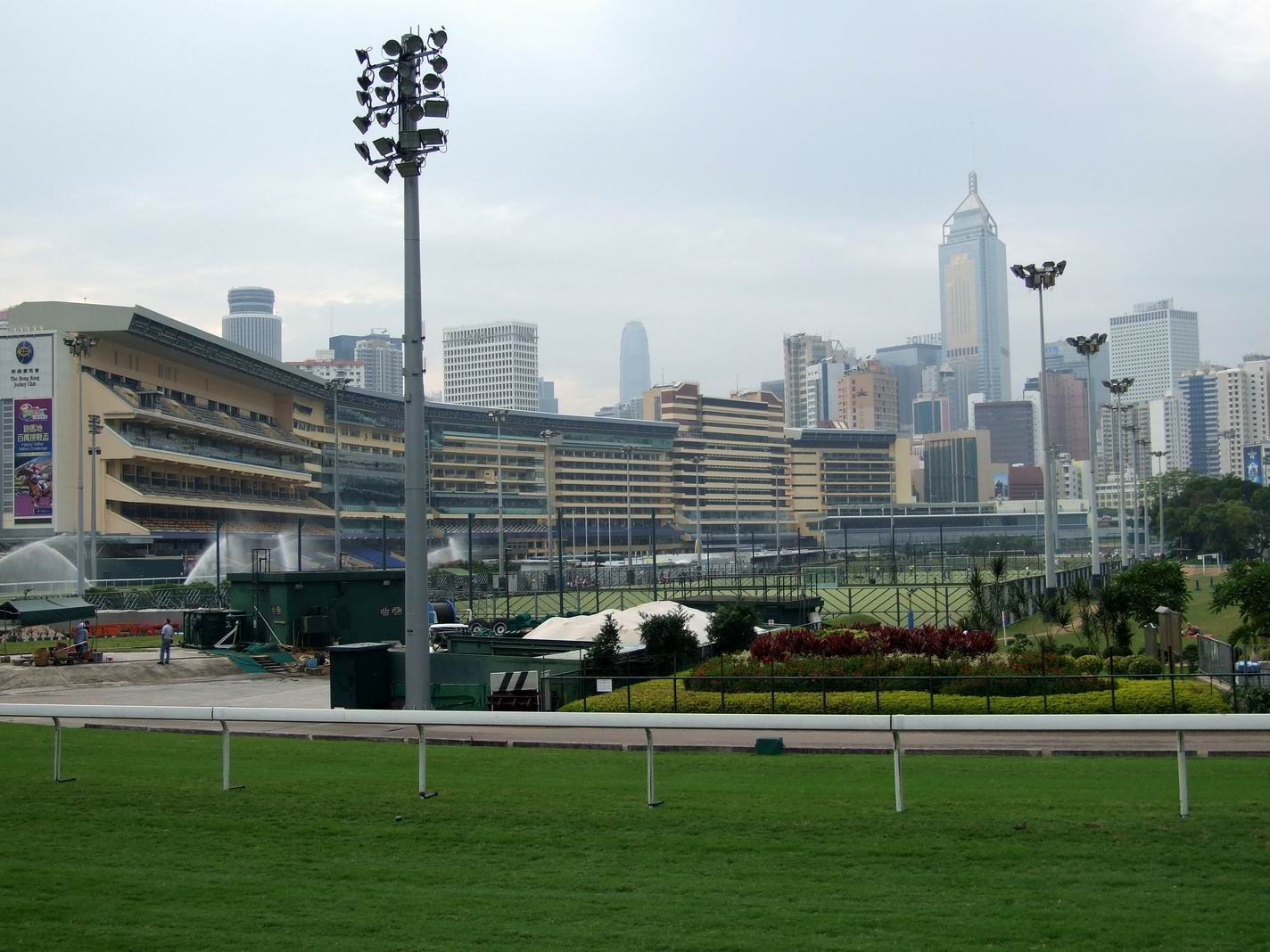
The Happy Valley Racecourse at the Hong Kong Jockey Club was the Pit Stop for this leg.

- Episode 10: "We Are Trying to Make Love, Not War" (April 15, 2007)
- Prize: A trip to Hong Kong during Chinese New Year (awarded to Oswald and Danny)

Locations

- Kuala Lumpur (Carcosa Seri Negara)
- Kuala Lumpur → Hong Kong
- Hong Kong (Sun Wah Kiu Dry Cleaning & Laundry)
- Hong Kong (Former Kai Tak Airport)
- Hong Kong (Former Cheung Sha Wan Police Quarters or Nga Tsin Wai Road)
- Hong Kong (Former Kennedy Town Police Headquarters)
- Hong Kong (Causeway Bay – Victoria Park)
- Hong Kong (Hong Kong Jockey Club & Happy Valley Racecourse)

Episode summary

- At the start of this leg, teams were instructed to fly to Hong Kong. Once there, teams had to find Sun Wah Kiu Dry Cleaning & Laundry, where they received their next clue.
- In this season's second Fast Forward, one team had to travel five miles (8.0 km) to a film set located at the former Kai Tak Airport, where a high-speed stunt was being filmed for an action movie. They had to get in a car with a stunt driver and endure a stunt course, which involved sharp turns and the car flipping over. Oswald and Danny won the Fast Forward.
- This leg's Detour was a choice between Kung Fu Fighting or Lost in Translation. In Kung Fu Fighting, teams had to travel five miles (8.0 km) to the former Cheung Sha Wan Police Quarters. There, they had to climb an eleven-story bamboo scaffold, while avoiding a mock battle between kung fu stuntmen, in order to reach the top and retrieve their next clue. In Lost in Translation, teams had to travel four miles (6.4 km) to Kowloon City and search among hundreds of similar-looking Chinese characters store signs on Nga Tsin Wai Road for the specific one – 滿玉時裝晚裝 – shown on their clue. When they found the matching store, the owner gave them their next clue.
- After the Detour, teams had to travel to the former Kennedy Town police headquarters to find their next clue.
- In this leg's Roadblock, one team member had to kick down doors in the old building of the former police headquarters and search for their next clue.
- After the Roadblock, teams had to travel to Victoria Park. There, teams had to find a model boat and a Travelocity Roaming Gnome. They then had to balance the gnome on the boat and pull the boat from one end of a pond to the other in order to retrieve the gnome and their next clue from inside the boat. If the gnome fell into the water, they had to start over. Teams then had to check in at the Pit Stop: the Happy Valley Racecourse at the Hong Kong Jockey Club.

Additional note

- This was a non-elimination leg.

=== Leg 11 (Hong Kong → Macau) ===
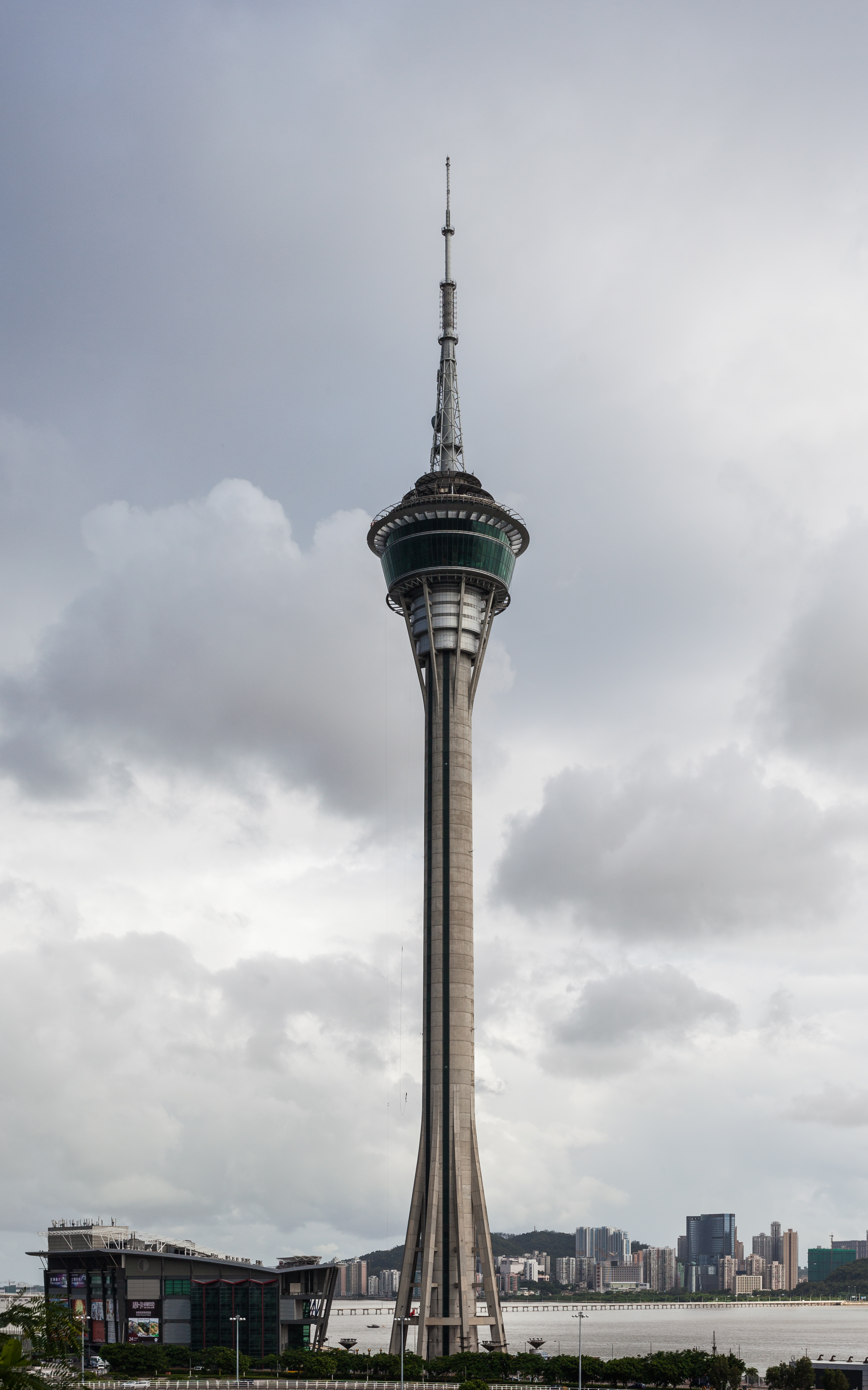
The Macau Tower was the site of the Roadblock of this leg.

- Episode 11: "Good Doing Business With You" (April 22, 2007)
- Prize: A Yamaha WaveRunner for each member (awarded to Dustin and Kandice)

Locations

- Hong Kong (Conrad Hong Kong)
- Hong Kong → Macau (Outer Harbour Ferry Terminal)
- Macau (Macau Tower)
- Macau (Lou Lim Ioc Garden)
- Macau (Edificio Fabril Veng Kin or Travessa da Saudade & Nam Van Lake)
- Macau (Rua de Silva Mendes)
- Macau (Trilho da Taipa Pequena 2000 Park)

Episode summary

- At the start of this leg, teams had to travel by ferry to Macau. Once there, teams had to find a man on a rickshaw outside the ferry terminal, who gave them their next clue. Teams then had to travel by taxi to the Macau Tower, where they found their next clue.
- In this leg's Roadblock, one team member had to walk around the outer rim of the Macau Tower observation deck and then perform what was, at the time, the world's tallest SkyJump by falling 660 feet (200 m) to the ground in a controlled descent in order to receive their next clue.
- After the Roadblock, teams had to travel to the Lou Lim Ioc Garden, which had their next clue.
- This leg's Detour was a choice between Noodle or Dragon. In Noodle, teams had to travel to the factory of Fábrica de Sopa de Fita Weng Kei, choose a noodle making station, and use traditional methods to flatten and cut dough into two bundles of Chinese noodles in order to receive their next clue. In Dragon, teams had to travel to a warehouse on Travessa da Saudade, obtain a dragon head and drum, and carry them three-quarters mile (1.2 km) to the harbor at Nam Van Lake. There, they had to attach the dragon head to a matching dragon boat and deliver the drum to the boat's master in exchange for their next clue.
- After the Detour, teams had to travel to Rua de Silva Mendes and find their next clue, which directed them to drive a Mini Moke to the Pit Stop: Trilho da Taipa Pequena 2000 Park.

Additional notes

- Oswald and Danny chose to Yield Eric and Danielle.
- This was a non-elimination leg.

=== Leg 12 (Macau → Hong Kong → Guam) ===
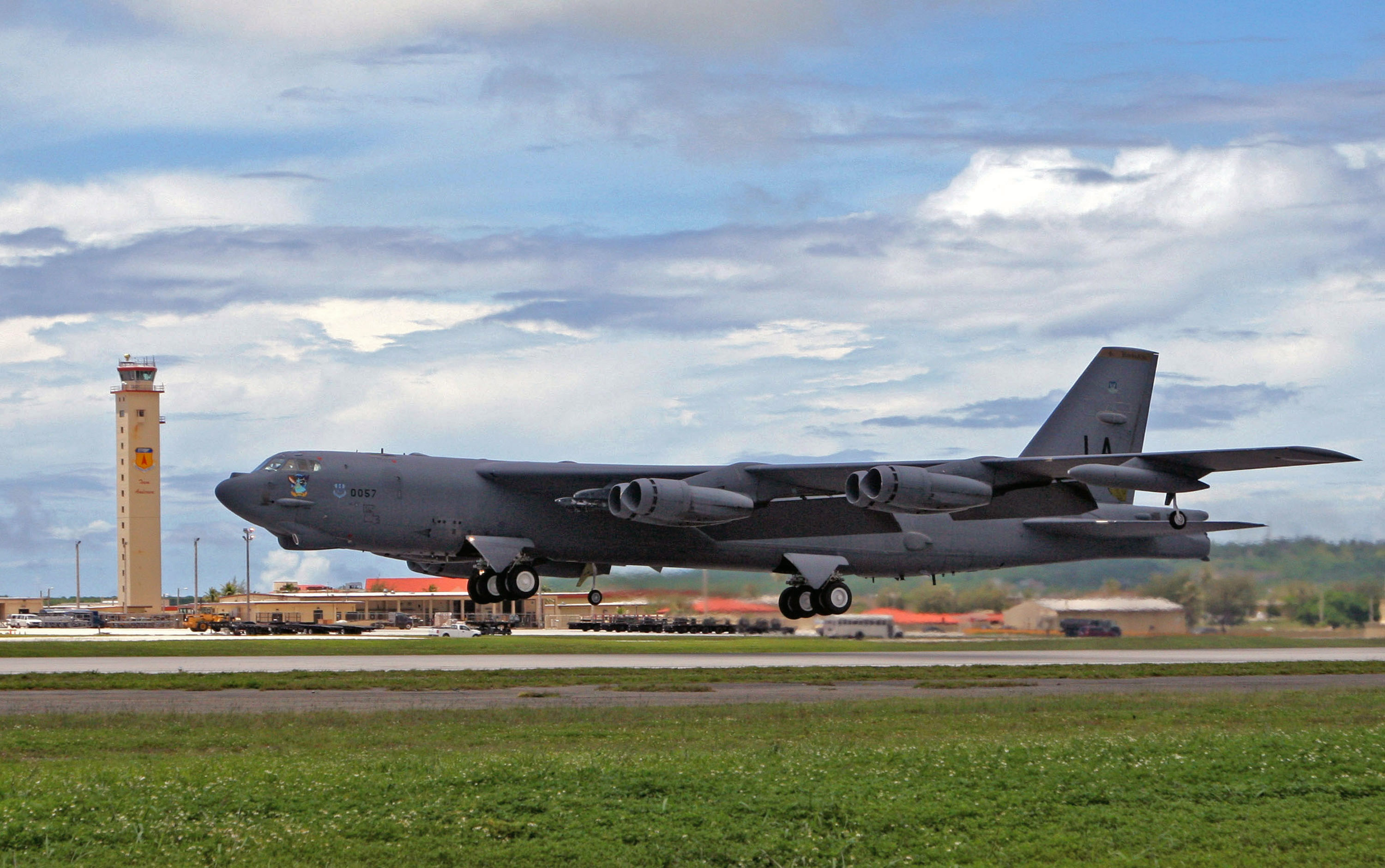
B-52 bombers were featured on one side of the Detour in Guam.

- Episode 12: "Oh My God, the Teletubbies Go to War" (April 29, 2007)
- Prize: An all-terrain vehicle for each member (awarded to Dustin and Kandice)
- Eliminated: Oswald and Danny

Locations

- Macau (Trilho da Taipa Pequena 2000 Park)
- Macau → Hong Kong
- Hong Kong → Hagåtña, Guam
- Yigo (Andersen Air Force Base)
- Santa Rita (Orote Peninsula – U.S. Naval Base Guam)
- Humåtak (Fort Soledad)

Episode summary

- At the start of this leg, teams were instructed to travel by ferry back to Hong Kong, and then fly to the island of Guam. Once there, teams had to drive themselves to Andersen Air Force Base, where they chose a military escort to drive them to the air base's control tower. There, they had to climb to the top of the control tower to find their next clue.
- This leg's Detour was a choice between Care Package or Engine Care. In Care Package, teams traveled to a warehouse and filled 500-pound (230 kg) packages with various humanitarian aid items for a neighboring island. Teams then boarded a C-17 Globemaster and participated in an airdrop training exercise. When they landed, the load master gave teams their next clue. In Engine Care, teams had to clean an engine pod on a B-52 bomber and scour the associated flap section on the wing to the satisfaction of an Air Force maintenance officer in order to receive their next clue.
- After the Detour, teams had to drive to the U.S. Naval Base on the Orote Peninsula, where a naval escort drove them to a specified location with their next clue.
- In this leg's Roadblock, one team member had to perform a search and rescue mission. Using a handheld GPS receiver, they had to navigate through the jungle to find one of four training officers, who provided coordinates directing them to the landing zone. Then they used a radio and smoke grenade to signal a rescue helicopter to pick them up. The helicopter brought them back to their partner, where they received their next clue directing them to the Pit Stop: Fort Soledad in Humåtak.

=== Leg 13 (Guam → United States) ===
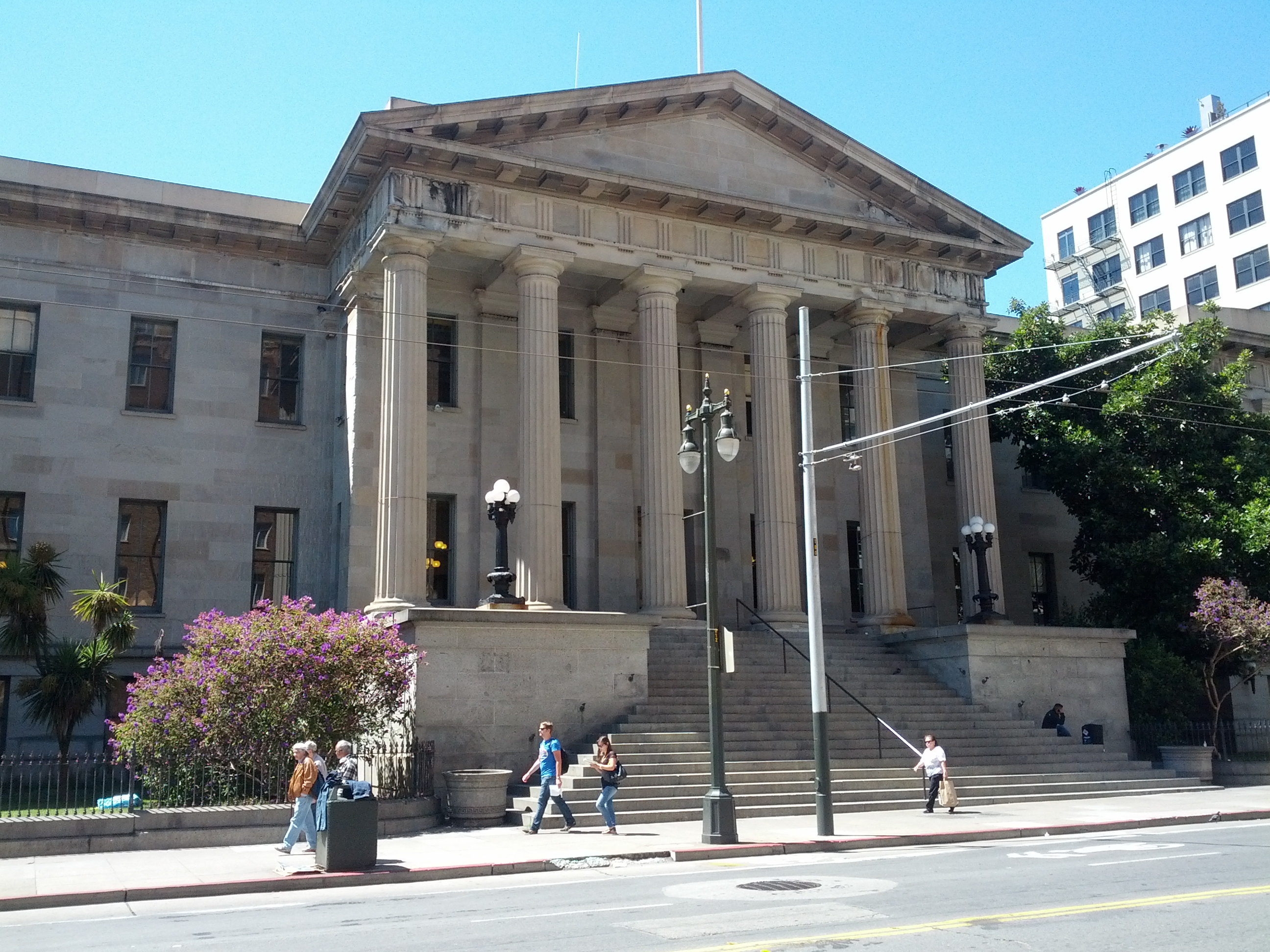
In the final destination, San Francisco, teams visited the San Francisco Old Mint for their final task.

- Episode 13: "Low to the Ground, That's My Technique" (May 6, 2007)
- Prize: US$1,000,000
- Winners: Eric and Danielle
- Runners-up: Dustin and Kandice
- Third place: Charla and Mirna

Locations

- Humåtak (Fort Soledad)
- Hagåtña → Honolulu, Hawaii
- Honolulu (Honolulu International Airport – Kamaka Air Hangar) → Lānaʻi City (Lanai Airport)
- Lānaʻi (Kaumalapau Harbor)
- Lānaʻi (Shipwreck Beach)
- Lānaʻi City → Honolulu
- Honolulu → Oakland, California
- San Francisco (Grateful Dead House) (Unaired)
- San Francisco (San Francisco Old Mint)
- San Francisco (San Francisco Botanical Garden)

Episode summary

- At the start of this leg, teams were instructed to fly to Honolulu, Hawaii. Once there, teams had to travel to the Kamaka Air Hangar and sign up for one of three helicopters departing ten minutes apart to the island of Lānaʻi. Once they landed, they had to choose a marked car, drive to Kaumalapau Harbor, and receive their next clue from a kahuna.
- This season's final Detour was a choice between Under or Over. In Under, teams had to swim into an underwater cave and retrieve a clue anchored to the cave's floor. In Over, teams had to use a paddle board and paddle together to reach a buoy that had their next clue.
- After the Detour, teams had to drive to Shipwreck Beach and then trek one mile (1.6 km) along the shore to find a clue, which instructed them to use a kayak to paddle to a buoy holding their next clue near a World War II shipwreck.
- Teams were instructed to return to Honolulu by helicopter, fly to Oakland, California, and travel to San Francisco. After finding their next clue at the San Francisco Old Mint, one team member had to enter a vault and answer four questions relating to their opinion of other teams from this season. Their answers created a four-digit code which locked a safe containing their final clue. Their partner then had ten minutes to correctly guess their teammate's answers to retrieve their final clue. If the ten minutes elapsed without a correct guess, a guard handed them their final clue. Teams were then directed to the finish line: the San Francisco Botanical Garden.

Questions	Answers					
Questions	Charla & Mirna		Dustin & Kandice		Eric & Danielle	
Who is the least trustworthy?	Rob & Amber	4	Joe & Bill	6	Oswald & Danny	8
Who has the best sense of humor?	Kevin & Drew	2	Uchenna & Joyce	7	Charla & Mirna	9
Who is the most overrated?	Rob & Amber	4	Rob & Amber	4	Rob & Amber	4
Who do you most want to stay in touch with?	John Vito & Jill	1	Uchenna & Joyce	7	Uchenna & Joyce	7

Additional notes

- On Lānaʻi, there was an unaired Roadblock where one team member had to perform a 30-foot (9.1 m) cliff jump.
- In an unaired segment, after arriving in California, teams had to travel to the Grateful Dead House in San Francisco.

== Reception ==
The Amazing Race 11 received mixed reviews. Linda Holmes of Television Without Pity was critical of this season's cast, writing that "there weren't that many teams that didn't halfway suck to begin with, and we still had about a 75 percent chance of a better ending than this. We're all cursed." Simon Brew of Den of Geek wrote that "the procession of camera hoggers in this season ultimately, come the final round, left the audience with a real problem: there was nobody to root for." Roger Holland of PopMatters wrote that "TAR-11 started poorly, stuttered and staggered around the globe like the zombified remains of its former self, and finished on an absolute all-time low." Leslie Seaton of BuddyTV wrote that even though "the season definitely had some exciting moments, I still maintain that I'm not sure an All-Star season is a great idea for this show." Stephanie DeGateo of Box Office Prophets wrote "The concept of racing all-stars was questionable to begin with – none of the reality all star editions have been particularly satisfying. In practice, this particular application was especially weak." Sarah Kickler Kelber of The Baltimore Sun wrote that "all in all, it was a fun season, even if it's not a result I would have predicted." Heather Havrilesky of Salon praised that "this season's challenges were some of the most frustrating and difficult ever". In 2016, the Rob Has a Podcast Amazing Race correspondents ranked this season 8th out of the first 27 seasons. In 2024, Rhenn Taguiam of Game Rant ranked this season 20th out of 36.

== Ratings ==
No. overall	No. in season	Title	Original release date	U.S. viewers (millions)	Rating/share (18–49)
122	1	"I Told You Less Martinis and More Cardio"	February 18, 2007	10.29	3.1/8
123	2	"Beauty Is Sometimes Skin Deep"	February 25, 2007	8.17	2.9/7
124	3	"I'm Sorry I'm Wearing a Bathing Suit. It Is Very Weird, I Know"	March 4, 2007	10.77	3.7/9
125	4	"No Babies on the Race!"	March 11, 2007	9.82	3.3/9
126	5	"You Need to Watch Your Jokes, Guy"	March 18, 2007	12.00	3.9/10
127	6	"We're Going to Trade You for Food Now"	March 25, 2007	10.59	3.3/8
128	7	"If I Were in Town, I'd Ask for Your Number"	April 1, 2007	8.95	2.9/8
129	8	"If I Were in Town, I'd Ask for Your Number"	April 1, 2007	8.95	2.9/8
130	9	"The Way You Look, Yeah"	April 8, 2007	9.29	2.9/8
131	10	"We Are Trying to Make Love, Not War"	April 15, 2007	9.04	3.0/8
132	11	"Good Doing Business With You"	April 22, 2007	8.69	2.8/8
133	12	"Oh My God, the Teletubbies Go to War"	April 29, 2007	9.43	3.1/9
134	13	"Low to the Ground, That's My Technique"	May 6, 2007	10.31	3.3/9

== Works cited ==
- Castro, Adam-Troy (2006). My Ox Is Broken!. BenBella Books. ISBN 978-1-932100-91-4.
