= Sci Fi Investigates =

US television program

- Starring: See credited cast below
- Country of origin: United States
- Original language: English
- No. of seasons: 1
- No. of episodes: 6

Production
- Running time: 60 minutes (including commercials)

Original release
- Network: Sci Fi Channel
- Release: October 11 – November 15, 2006

Sci Fi Investigates is a six episode reality television series featuring skeptic Rob Mariano, forensic specialist Deborah Dobrydney, archaeologist Bill Doleman, and paranormal investigator Richard Dolan, as they look at paranormal and supernatural phenomenon and try to explain them. The show debuted in October 2006 on the American Syfy channel following Ghost Hunters. There have also been two webisodes.

== Episode format ==
The series documents a team of four paranormal investigators who travel to various locations around the United States and investigate various urban legends.

The team uses various research methods to gather as much information as they can about the particular legend or phenomena an episode focuses on. They meet with local residents, listen to eye-witness reports, study documentation, conduct forensic experiments on physical evidence, and conduct on-location archaeological studies. At the end they review and discuss their findings, and each investigator gives their opinions from different points-of-view.

Each episode is an hour long, including commercials.

== Criticism ==
The Cryptomundo blog by Mothman researcher Loren Coleman is an in-depth criticism of the October 26, 2006, "Sci-fi Investigates" broadcast's "Mothman" episode. Coleman wrote that while it had a few moments that are pure entertainment and certainly funny, it had little or nothing to do with "investigating" Mothman or unexplained phenomena.

== Credited cast ==
- Deborah Dobrydney – Dobrydney is a forensics specialist with a B.S. in psychology and a B.A. in Spanish studies both from Fordham University in New York and is a graduate of the Masters of Science program from the University of New Haven. She has worked for a crime scene investigation unit since 2002.
- Richard M. Dolan – Dolan is a paranormal investigator and author of two volumes entitled UFOs and the National Security State. Prior to his interest in UFOs, he studied Cold War history, tactics and diplomacy. He has a master's degree in history from the University of Rochester and a bachelor's degree in history from Alfred University. He earned a certificate in political theory from Oxford University and was a Rhodes Scholar finalist. Dolan has also appeared in numerous paranormal documentaries over the years including Sci-Fi Channel's UFO Invasion at Rendlesham documentary.
- Bill Doleman – Dr. Doleman is an archaeologist. He was also the chief investigator of a Roswell, New Mexico evidence dig conducted by the University of New Mexico and documented in the 2003 documentary The Roswell Crash: Startling New Evidence, which was hosted by Bryant Gumbel and also produced by the Sci-Fi Channel. Doleman is a 1995 graduate of UNM with a Ph.D. in anthropology. In 2004, Doleman became director of New Mexico's archaeological archive and database (a.k.a. ARMS).
- Rob Mariano – An adventurer, Rob Mariano was also the former competitor "Boston Rob" to fans of Survivor: Marquesas, Survivor: All-Stars and The Amazing Race. He is the skeptic of the investigative team.
- Lisa Van Camp – Van Camp is a forensic analyst (appeared in "Roswell" and "Paranormal Hotspots" episodes, filling in for Dobrydney)

== Episodes ==
Ep#	Investigation	Original Airdate	Summary
101	Voodoo	October 11, 2006	The team travels to New Orleans, LA to investigate the practice of voodoo.
102	Bigfoot	October 18, 2006	The team attempts to debunk a recent Bigfoot video by recreating the sighting of the creature with Rob wearing a Hollywood-movie quality Bigfoot costume.
103	Mothman	October 25, 2006	The team travels to the mountains of West Virginia to investigate sightings of a winged creature known as the Mothman.
104	The Afterlife	November 1, 2006	The team looks for evidence of the afterlife by subjecting themselves to special aura photography, sensory deprivation and past life regression experiments.
105	The Roswell Incident	November 8, 2006	The team looks at the Roswell UFO incident. (Note: Lisa Van Camp filled in for Dobrydney for this episode.)
106	Paranormal Hotspots	November 15, 2006	The team visits Dulce, NM, and Sedona, AZ which are the sites of numerous reports of UFO sightings, cattle mutilations, and other alleged paranormal activity.

=== Specials ===
- Highway to Hell: The Legends of Clinton Road (SciFi.com Webisode in five parts) – Deborah and Richard investigate local ghost stories of Clinton Road in West Milford, NJ.

== See also ==
- The X Creatures – a similar BBC series
- Destination Truth
- Ghost Hunters
