= Secret Celebrity Renovation =

American television comedy reality show

- Genre: Reality television
- Presented by: Nischelle Turner
- Starring: Sabrina Soto; Jason Cameron; Rob Mariano
- Country of origin: United States
- Original language: English
- No. of seasons: 3
- No. of episodes: 28

Production
- Executive producers: Robert Horowitz; Lewis Fenton; Peter DeVitaas
- Production company: Juma Entertainment

Original release
- Network: CBS
- Release: July 9, 2021 – September 20, 2024

Secret Celebrity Renovation is an American reality television series that premiered on CBS on July 9, 2021. The series is hosted by Nischelle Turner of Entertainment Tonight, who is accompanied by a design team initially consisting of interior designer Sabrina Soto and home improvement contractor Jason Cameron; for the series' second season, Cameron was replaced by "Boston Rob" Mariano, a general contractor and former contestant on multiple seasons of the reality competition series Survivor, who had previously appeared on SCR as the featured celebrity in the season 1 finale.

In March 2022, the series was renewed for a second season which premiered on July 29, 2022.

In May 2023, the series was renewed for its third and final season which premiered on August 4, 2023.

== Production ==
On December 14, 2020, it was announced that CBS had ordered the series with Nischelle Turner as the host and Robert Horowitz, Lewis Fenton and Peter DeVitaas as the executive producers. On June 14, 2021, it was announced that the series would premiere on July 9, 2021. On March 9, 2022, CBS renewed the series for a second season which premiered on July 29, 2022. On May 22, 2023, CBS renewed the series for a third season which premiered on August 4, 2023.

== Episodes ==
=== Series overview ===
Season	Episodes	Originally released	
Season	Episodes	First released	Last released
1	10	July 9, 2021	September 24, 2021
2	9	July 29, 2022	September 23, 2022
3	9	August 4, 2023	September 20, 2024

=== Season 1 (2021) ===
No. overall	No. in season	Title	Original release date	Prod. code	U.S. viewers (millions)
1	1	"Wayne Brady"	July 9, 2021	SCR101	3.01
2	2	"Anthony Ramos"	July 16, 2021	SCR102	2.81
3	3	"Chris Paul"	July 23, 2021	SCR103	2.25
4	4	"Eve"	July 30, 2021	SCR104	2.17
5	5	"Lauren Alaina"	August 6, 2021	SCR105	2.17
6	6	"Jesse Tyler Ferguson"	August 13, 2021	SCR106	2.60
7	7	"Paula Abdul"	August 20, 2021	SCR107	2.47
8	8	"Emmitt Smith"	August 27, 2021	SCR108	2.74
9	9	"Boomer Esiason"	September 3, 2021	SCR109	2.54
10	10	"Rob Mariano"	September 24, 2021	SCR110	1.81

=== Season 2 (2022) ===
No. overall	No. in season	Title	Original release date	Prod. code	U.S. viewers (millions)
11	1	"Billy Gardell"	July 29, 2022	SCR203	2.68
12	2	"Debbie Gibson"	August 5, 2022	SCR201	2.31
13	3	"Nathan Chen"	August 12, 2022	SCR207	1.83
14	4	"Annaleigh Ashford"	August 19, 2022	SCR202	2.09
15	5	"Utkarsh Ambudkar"	August 26, 2022	SCR204	2.13
16	6	"Kandi Burruss"	September 2, 2022	SCR206	1.99
17	7	"Shaquille O'Neal"	September 9, 2022	SCR208	2.53
18	8	"Aaron Donald"	September 16, 2022	SCR205	2.26
19	9	"Nicole Scherzinger"	September 23, 2022	SCR209	1.62

=== Season 3 (2023) ===
No. overall	No. in season	Title	Original release date	Prod. code	U.S. viewers (millions)
20	1	"Phil Keoghan"	August 4, 2023	SCR301	2.32
21	2	"Max Thieriot"	August 4, 2023	SCR304	2.32
22	3	"J. B. Smoove"	August 11, 2023	SCR302	2.29
23	4	"Beth Behrs"	August 18, 2023	SCR305	2.20
24	5	"Damar Hamlin"	September 1, 2023	SCR303	2.18
25	6	"Niecy Nash"	September 15, 2023	SCR306	1.97
26	7	"Davante Adams"	September 22, 2023	SCR307	2.38
27	8	"Elle King"	September 29, 2023	SCR308	2.07
28	9	"Mookie Betts"	September 20, 2024	SCR309	2.04

== Ratings ==
Viewership and ratings per episode of Secret Celebrity Renovation
No.	Title	Air date	Rating (18–49)	Viewers (millions)	DVR (18–49)	DVR viewers (millions)	Total (18–49)	Total viewers (millions)
1	"Wayne Brady"	July 9, 2021	0.3	3.01	0.0	0.25	0.4	3.26
2	"Anthony Ramos"	July 16, 2021	0.3	2.81	0.0	0.25	0.3	3.06
3	"Chris Paul"	July 23, 2021	0.2	2.25	0.0	0.24	0.2	2.49
4	"Eve"	July 30, 2021	0.3	2.17	0.0	0.23	0.3	2.40
5	"Lauren Alaina"	August 6, 2021	0.2	2.17	0.1	0.25	0.3	2.42
6	"Jesse Tyler Ferguson"	August 13, 2021	0.3	2.60	TBD	TBD	TBD	TBD
7	"Paula Abdul"	August 20, 2021	0.3	2.47	0.0	0.24	0.3	2.71
8	"Emmitt Smith"	August 27, 2021	0.3	2.74	TBD	TBD	TBD	TBD
9	"Boomer Esiason"	September 3, 2021	0.3	2.54	TBD	TBD	TBD	TBD
10	"Rob Mariano"	September 24, 2021	0.2	1.81	TBD	TBD	TBD	TBD
