= Rob Mariano =

American television personality (born 1975)

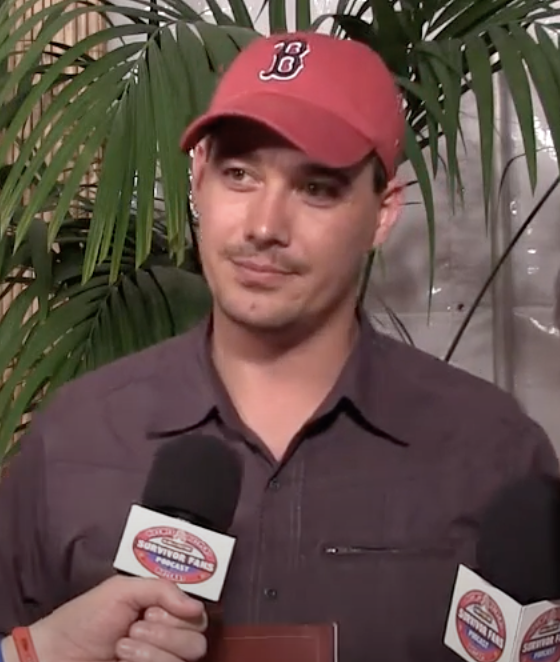
- Mariano in 2013
- Born: Robert Carlo Mariano; December 25, 1975 (age 50); Boston, Massachusetts, U.S.
- Other name: Boston Rob
- Education: Boston University (BA)
- Occupation: TV personality
- Television: Survivor: Marquesas; Survivor: All-Stars (runner-up); The Amazing Race 7 (runner-up); The Amazing Race 11: All-Stars; Survivor: Heroes vs. Villains; Survivor: Redemption Island (winner); Survivor: Island of the Idols (mentor); Survivor: Winners at War; Deal or No Deal Island; The Traitors 3
- Spouse: Amber Brkich (m. 2005)
- Children: 4
- Website: bostonrob.com

Robert Carlo Mariano (born December 25, 1975), known by the nickname Boston Rob, is an American television personality, known for appearing in the CBS reality show Survivor. He placed 10th in the show's fourth season Survivor: Marquesas, finished as the runner-up to his eventual wife Amber Brkich in the show's eighth season Survivor: All-Stars, came in 13th place in the show's 20th season Survivor: Heroes vs. Villains, and won the show's 22nd season Survivor: Redemption Island. Mariano returned for the show's 39th season Survivor: Island of the Idols as a mentor for the new players alongside Sandra Diaz-Twine. He competed for a fifth time, coming in 17th place in the show's 40th season Survivor: Winners at War. Mariano is the first person to compete on Survivor five times.

Mariano also competed on other reality shows, including on The Amazing Race twice alongside his wife (The Amazing Race 7 and The Amazing Race 11: All-Stars), as well as Deal or No Deal Island and The Traitors season 3.

== Early life ==
Robert Carlo Mariano was born on December 25, 1975, and raised in Hyde Park, Boston, Massachusetts. He is of Italian descent. Mariano graduated from Xaverian Brothers High School in 1994, where he played golf and hockey. Five years later, Mariano graduated with a Bachelor of Arts degree in psychology from Boston University. He made the school's hockey team in 1995 as a freshman, but declined to play for coach Jack Parker after he was told that he would not receive much ice time. Mariano first played on Survivor in 2001 at age 25, and continued to coach the hockey team.

== Survivor ==
=== Marquesas ===
Assigned to the Maraamu tribe at the start of the game, Mariano was successful in leading a counter alliance against Hunter Ellis though as a result of this their challenge performance was lackluster compared to the opposing tribe. In the fourth episode, "The Winds Twist", Mariano was swapped into the minority on his new tribe, Rotu, though was spared when Gabriel Cade's apathetic nature to the game was seen as detrimental. When the tribes merged, Mariano was viewed as the biggest target by the original Rotu tribe members and attempted to counter by warning of a splinter group of John Carroll, Tammy Leitner, Zoe Zanidakis, and Robert DeCanio though this proved unsuccessful and was voted out in a 7-2-1 vote.

=== All-Stars ===
Mariano was announced to compete in Survivor: All-Stars after his prior performance in Survivor: Marquesas. Assigned to the Chapera tribe, Mariano formed an immediate alliance with Amber Brkich, and successfully navigated the game together through brokering deals with contestants that he never intended to honor, while securing an alliance with Jenna Lewis and Rupert Boneham to eliminate bigger targets. Upon reaching the final tribal council, Mariano was lambasted for abusing his relationships with contestants outside of the game to benefit himself, although he was also praised for his aggressive, albeit immoral, gameplay. On May 9, 2004, before the votes were announced, Mariano proposed to Brkich, which she accepted. Mariano lost the season in a 4–3 vote.

=== Heroes vs. Villains ===
For his actions in Survivor: All-Stars, Mariano was announced as a contestant for Survivor: Heroes vs. Villains. Assigned to the Villains tribe, Mariano was the de facto leader of the Villains with his storyline focused on his rivalry with Russell Hantz and their differing views of the game. In the sixth episode, "Banana Etiquette", Mariano and his alliance planned to split the vote between Hantz and Parvati Shallow to eliminate either target and a hidden immunity idol, but their plan was thwarted when Tyson Apostol changed his vote, leading to Apostol's elimination. In the seventh episode, "I'm Not a Good Villain", with Mariano now in the minority of his tribe, he appealed to Benjamin "Coach" Wade's sense of honesty and integrity to vote Hantz. Coach was divided between his allegiances to both Mariano and Hantz but ultimately went neutral by voting for Courtney Yates, and Mariano was voted out.

=== Redemption Island ===
On January 13, 2011, Mariano was announced as a competitor for his fourth season, Survivor: Redemption Island, in a continuation of his Heroes vs Villains feud with Russell Hantz; the latter, however, was voted out early on. Mariano, through his hard work ethic and likeability from his new tribe, became the de facto leader. As a result of this, Mariano formed a majority alliance with Andrea Boehlke, Grant Mattos, Natalie Tenerelli, Matt Elrod, and Ashley Underwood. As the game progressed, Mariano successfully eliminated opponents with relative ease, and formed an alliance with outsider Phillip Sheppard due to his abrasive and unpredictable nature. Using his past experiences and ability to read his fellow players, Mariano controlled every vote in which he was involved, and was able to reach the final tribal council. He was praised for his dominant game over finalists Sheppard and Tenerelli, who attributed their success to Mariano, although he did receive criticism for being cutthroat and a cult leader. On May 15, 2011, Mariano was revealed to have won the season in an 8-1-0 vote, after 4 seasons and 117 days of playing. Whilst viewers and fans were critical of his win, Jeff Probst characterized Mariano's game as the "most perfect game of Survivor ever."

=== Island of the Idols ===
Mariano, along with former castmate Sandra Diaz-Twine, returned for the 39th season in a mentor role for a new group of castaways. Unable to vote or compete in challenges, Mariano and Diaz-Twine lived together on a separate beach from the game and, at times, had one player visit to be taught a lesson regarding the various facets and strategies of Survivor. They would also attend each Tribal Council in a hideaway. On the morning of Day 37, Mariano and Diaz-Twine departed from the eponymous Island of the Idols, leaving a luxurious shelter and supplies for the final five castaways of the season.

=== Winners at War ===
At the finale of Survivor: Island of the Idols, it was announced that Mariano would be competing alongside 19 other winners of the show, including Brkich. He was placed on the Sele tribe, where he quickly formed an "Old-School" alliance with Parvati Shallow and Ethan Zohn, although the alliance ultimately fell apart due to Danni Boatwright informing Ben Driebergen of its existence. Mariano was later switched to the Yara tribe with Driebergen, Adam Klein, Sarah Lacina, and Sophie Clarke, where he was the sixth person voted out of the game after trying to take control of the tribe. Mariano was defeated by Tyson Apostol and Natalie Anderson respectively in the challenges to return from the Edge of Extinction, and was sent to the jury for the first time in his Survivor career. Mariano voted for Tony Vlachos to win the season, which he did in a 12-4-0 vote, making Vlachos the second two-time Sole Survivor following Diaz-Twine, and the winner of the increased grand prize of $2,000,000.

With this season, Mariano became the first Survivor contestant to play for a fifth time; Mariano once again became the longest-played Survivor contestant in his career, having played a cumulative 152 days (excluding the 37 days in Island of the Idols) over five seasons, surpassing the previous record held by Ozzy Lusth, who played for 128 days over four seasons set in Survivor: Game Changers.

== The Amazing Race ==
=== Season 7 ===
As an engaged couple, Mariano and Amber Brkich participated in the seventh season of The Amazing Race, finishing in second place. During a Roadblock challenge in Mendoza, Argentina, in the third leg of the race, contestants had to eat 4 pounds (1.8 kg) of meat. Mariano began the roadblock, but very quickly determined he would not or could not eat that quantity. The penalty for not finishing the Roadblock was a four-hour delay. By convincing a few other contestants to refuse to participate, Mariano ensured that several contestants were on the same timetable as he and Brkich were. Also in South America, Mariano pooled his money with some other racers to bribe the bus driver into letting off earlier the teams that had contributed; Mariano, though, used none of his own money.

In Botswana, during the sixth leg of the race, Mariano and Brkich were criticized by fellow racers, as well as by host Phil Keoghan, when they drove by the car accident of another team, brothers Brian and Greg Smith, without stopping. Their fellow competitors all checked in with the brothers prior to continuing on to the next stage of the race. In southern Africa, Mariano and Brkich saw their own photo on a magazine cover.

Mariano and Brkich ultimately finished in second place behind married couple Uchenna and Joyce Agu. Amongst fans, there was much speculation surrounding the final leg of the race. It was argued that the production crew had intervened with airport authorities and aided Uchenna and Joyce onto the same, earlier plane as Mariano and Brkich had been on. In the "Revisiting the Race" special feature on the Season 7 DVD, Mariano, along with Uchenna and Keoghan, denied these accusations. Mariano described Uchenna running around frantically trying to get onto the flight, which the final edited version of the show does not portray. Keoghan said that the decision to re-open the door rested solely with the pilot, and that intervention by the production crew would have resulted in someone leaking such information out. Although Mariano and Brkich lost the one million dollar grand prize and The Amazing Race 7 winners' title at the final leg of the race, they managed to win the second, fourth, seventh, and tenth legs. They were also the only team to not come in last place on any legs of the race.

=== All-Stars ===
The Marianos later competed in the first All-Stars season of The Amazing Race, which began airing in February 2007. The couple's racing status was listed as "newlyweds". While they had set a record for The Amazing Race by winning the first three legs, the Marianos were eliminated on the fourth leg of the race.

== The Traitors ==
Mariano was a contestant on the third season of the American reality competition The Traitors, which aired in 2025. During the season, he came in 12th place after being eliminated in a roundtable vote. Starting with the fourth season of the series, Mariano began hosting The Traitors Official Podcast along with fellow season 3 contestant, Bob the Drag Queen. They recap each episode and interview some of the contestants after they are eliminated from the show.

== Additional television appearances ==
In 2004, Mariano was the narrator/player operator of a short-lived reality series on UPN titled The Player.

On April 16, 2005, Mariano and Brkich were married in a private ceremony at Atlantis Paradise Island in the Bahamas. CBS aired a two-hour special about the wedding, Rob and Amber Get Married, on May 24, 2005.

Mariano was a co-host of the six-week Sci Fi series, Sci Fi Investigates.

Between their two appearances on The Amazing Race, Mariano and Brkich filmed a 10-episode show for the Fox Reality Channel, Rob and Amber: Against the Odds in 2006, which aired the following year. Set in Las Vegas, the program follows Mariano's attempts to become a professional poker player, and features professional player Daniel Negreanu tutoring him. The series ended with Rob and Amber Mariano accepting an offer to appear on The Amazing Race 11, and the odds of Rob's professional poker career waned.

Mariano was co-host on The History Channel's Around the World in 80 Ways, which ran from October to December 2011.

In 2016, Mariano appeared in a special episode of The Price Is Right, which featured multiple former Survivor contestants competing on the show. The episode aired on May 23, 2016.

In 2022, Mariano was in a Season 2 episode of Secret Celebrity Renovation, where he and his company helped restore houses for various celebrities.

Mariano was a contestant on the first season of Deal or No Deal Island. He was eliminated at the final four challenge, coming in last place, after receiving a three-minute penalty for looking at another player's completed puzzle. Mariano then became the host of Deal or No Deal Island After Show with Boston Rob, which aired its first episode on January 8, 2025, coinciding with the start of the second season of the series. In the show, Rob sits down with eliminated players to discuss the challenges, talk about social interactions, and share behind-the-scenes footage from the latest episode of Deal or No Deal Island.

Title	Date	Type	Role	Description
Calvin Ayre Wild Card Poker	2006	Poker competition	Himself	Mariano appeared on Calvin Ayre Wild Card Poker in 2006. He was eliminated in Episode 4, but came back to win the second-chance celebrity table. He was eliminated once again in the final episode.
Poker Dome Challenge	October 8, 2006	Poker competition	Himself	Mariano appeared on the October 8, 2006, episode of Poker Dome Challenge where he finished in second place.

== Personal life ==
Mariano began a relationship with fellow reality TV contestant Amber Brkich in 2003, during their time filming Survivor: All-Stars. They got engaged on May 9, 2004, during the show's live finale at Madison Square Garden in New York City; the couple got married on April 16, 2005, at Atlantis Paradise Island in The Bahamas. CBS aired a two-hour special about the wedding, entitled Rob and Amber Get Married, a month later on May 24. After their marriage, Brkich took Mariano's surname, and the couple moved to Pensacola, Florida. They have four daughters: Lucia Rose (born July 4, 2009), Carina Rose (born December 10, 2010), Isabetta Rose (born May 5, 2012), and Adelina Rose (born June 20, 2014). Like their parents, the girls are members of the Catholic Church.

== Filmography ==
=== Television ===
Year	Title	Role	Notes
2002	Survivor: Marquesas	Contestant	Eliminated; 10th place
2004	Survivor: All-Stars	Contestant	Runner-up
2004	The Player	Host	8 episodes
2005	The Amazing Race 7	Contestant	Runner-up (with Amber Mariano)
2005	Rob and Amber Get Married	Himself	1 episode
2006	Sci Fi Investigates	Co-host	6 episodes
2007	The Amazing Race: All-Stars	Contestant	Eliminated; 8th place (with Amber Mariano)
2008	Reality Obsessed	Guest	1 episode
2010	Survivor: Heroes vs. Villains	Contestant	Eliminated; 13th place
2011	Survivor: Redemption Island	Contestant	Winner
2011	Around the World in 80 Ways	Co-host	10 episodes
2013	Survivor: Caramoan — Fans vs. Favorites	Himself	Episode 15: "Reunion Show"
2016	The Price Is Right	Contestant	1 episode
2019	Survivor: Island of the Idols	Mentor	14 episodes
2020	Survivor: Winners at War	Contestant	Eliminated; 17th place
2022–present	Secret Celebrity Renovation	Design Team	Recurring role
2024	Deal or No Deal Island 1	Contestant	Eliminated; 4th place
2025	The Traitors 3	Contestant	Eliminated; 12th place
2025	Deal or No Deal Island After Show with Boston Rob	Host	
2025	Big Brother 27	Guest	1 episode
2025	Big Brother: Unlocked	Guest	Companion show with Big Brother 27 (1 episode)

Preceded by Jud "Fabio" Birza	Winner of Survivor; Survivor: Redemption Island	Succeeded by Sophie Clarke
Preceded by Lillian Morris	Runner-Up of Survivor; Survivor: All-Stars	Succeeded by Twila Tanner
