= Around the World in 80 Ways =

- Genre: Reality
- Starring: Rob Mariano; Dennis Anderson
- Country of origin: United States
- Original language: English
- No. of seasons: 1
- No. of episodes: 10

Production
- Running time: 45—48 minutes

Original release
- Network: History Channel
- Release: October 2 – December 4, 2011

Around the World in 80 Ways is an American reality show that aired on History in 2011. The program followed television personality Rob Mariano and professional monster truck driver Dennis Anderson as they traveled around the world using 80 various forms of transportation. The show was also broadcast in Southeast Asia on the Discovery Channel.

== Overview ==
The program followed Mariano and Anderson as they circumnavigated the globe using 80 forms of transportation. Each episode generally demonstrated 7-10 unique forms of transportation as the duo traveled from one location to another. Modes of transportation, excluding walking, were only used once each.

=== Modes of transportation ===
1. Tow Truck
2. The Beast
3. Commercial Jet
4. Tour Bus
5. Zip Line
6. Horse
7. Motorcycle
8. Water Taxi
9. Reed Boat
10. Window Washer
11. Road Train
12. Combine
13. Ostrich
14. Hand Rail Car
15. Road Painter
16. Ice Cream Cart
17. Hang Glider
18. Chinese Planes
19. Fire Bikes
20. Safari Car
21. Bushmen Walking
22. Donkey
23. Pontoon Boat
24. Motorized Canoe
25. Funicular
26. Wheelbarrow
27. Steam Train
28. Dump Truck
29. Steam Roller
30. Hearse
31. Baggage Tug
32. Cargo Plane
33. Wire Cars
34. Cargo Truck
35. Wooden Bike
36. Ferry Boat
37. Hot Air Balloon
38. Stilts
39. Dhow Boat
40. Moped
41. Roller Coaster
42. Cigarette Boat
43. Ferrari
44. Elevator
45. Bobsled
46. Wave Runner
47. Dune Buggy
48. Camel
49. Tuk Tuk
50. Elephants
51. Monster Trike
52. Ox Cart
53. Raft
54. Tractor
55. Holy Roller
56. Nano car
57. Rickshaw
58. Electric Train
59. Indian Taxi
60. River boat
61. Palanquin
62. Long tail boat
63. Iron Buffalo
64. Buffalo cart
65. Sampan
66. Salt pan roller
67. Monk mobile
68. Trannycab
69. Suitcase car
70. Yike bike
71. Cup cake car
72. Sea breacher
73. Model T
74. Wind digger
75. Cart attack
76. Helicopter
77. Water skis
78. Hybrid car
79. Hovercraft
80. Sky diving

== Episodes and original airdates ==
1. Titicaca or Bust — October 2, 2011
2. The Boys from Ipanema — October 9, 2011
3. Falling for Victoria Falls — October 16, 2011
4. Hold Your Hearses — October 23, 2011
5. Hot and Bothered — October 30, 2011
6. Crash Buggies — November 6, 2011
7. Beasts of Burden — November 13, 2011
8. Riding Rickshaw — November 20, 2011
9. From Buffalo to Bangkok — November 27, 2011
10. Such Great Heights — December 4, 2011

== See also ==
- History Television
