= Nischelle Turner =

American television personality

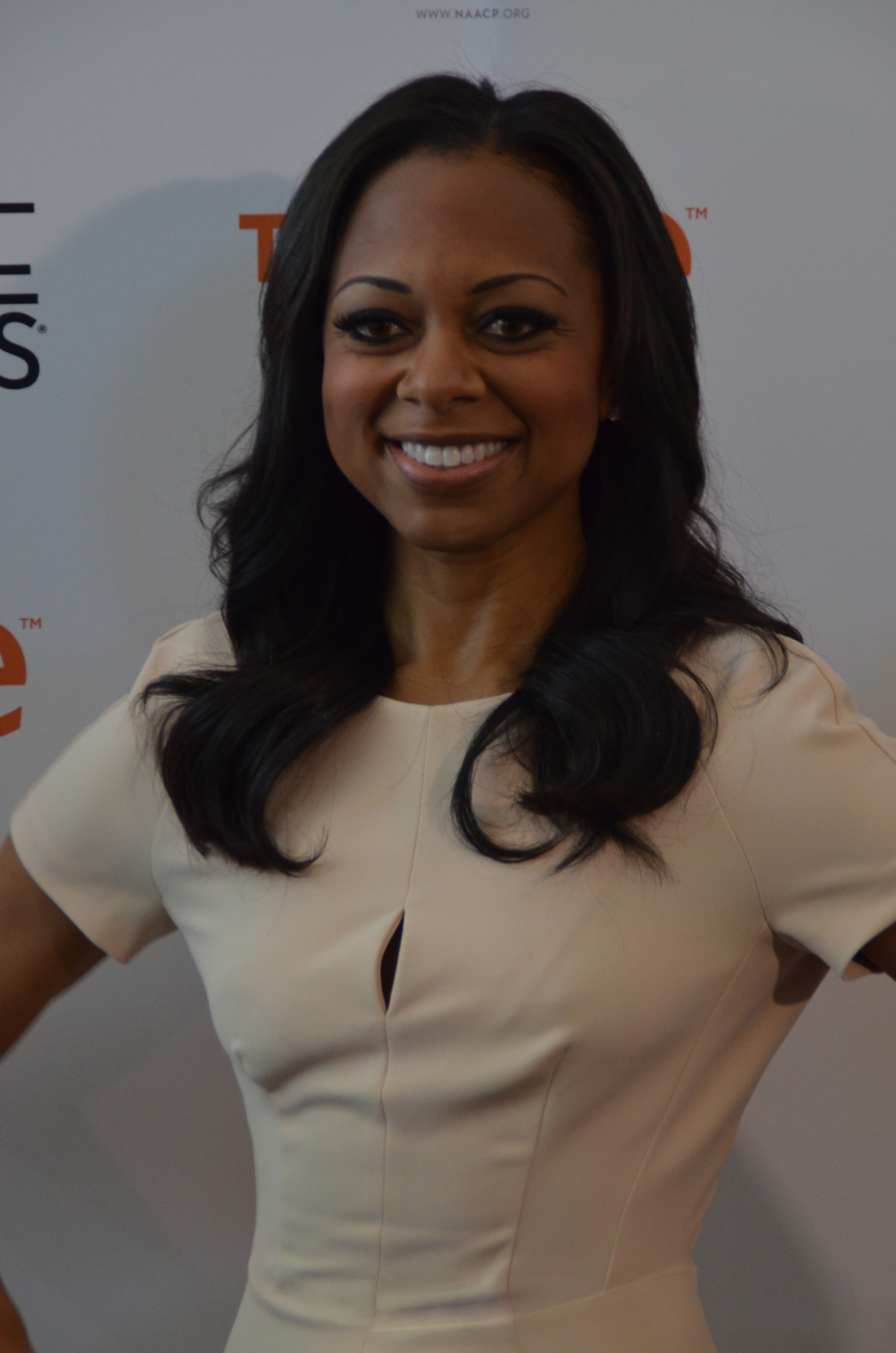
- Turner at the 46th NAACP Image Awards nominee press conference
- Born: Nischelle Renee Turner; February 11, 1975 (age 51); Columbia, Missouri, U.S.
- Education: University of Missouri (BA)
- Occupations: Reporter; Entertainment correspondent
- Years active: 1998–present

Nischelle Turner (born February 11, 1975) is the co-host of Entertainment Tonight (2014–present) alongside Kevin Frazier. Previously, she was former entertainment correspondent for HLN's Showbiz Tonight and CNN and an entertainment correspondent for KNBC in Los Angeles. She is a native of Columbia, Missouri.

== Career ==
Turner attended the University of Missouri, and graduated from its Missouri School of Journalism in 1998. She began her journalism career that same year when she joined WEHT as a reporter and fill-in anchor in Evansville, Indiana. In 2000, Turner was a weekday reporter and weekend anchor for WVUE-TV FOX8 in New Orleans. After establishing a presence in news, Turner joined KTTV FOX11 in Los Angeles in 2004 as a reporter on Good Day L.A. and host/anchor for Good Day L.A. Weekend from 2004 to October 2, 2008. Turner also worked as a sideline reporter for Fox's Sunday NFL broadcasts, and did segments for a show called Dailies. Prior to KTTV, she worked for WEHT, the ABC affiliate in Evansville, Indiana and for WVUE, the Fox affiliate in New Orleans. In December 2011, Turner joined CNN and led the network's coverage from the red carpet at the Grammys, Golden Globes, and Academy Awards, a position she held until 2014.

Turner also served as host of Secret Celebrity Renovation, which began in July 2021; the show has been on hiatus since September 2024.

=== Entertainment Tonight ===
In September 2014, it was announced that Turner would replace Rocsi Diaz as weekend co-anchor and correspondent on Entertainment Tonight, and would begin later that year; Turner has hosted the show ever since. She has since become an eight-time Emmy-award winner for her work on Entertainment Tonight, winning her latest, the Daytime Emmy Award for Outstanding Entertainment News Program, in 2025.
