= Fort Nuestra Señora de la Soledad =

- U.S. National Register of Historic Places
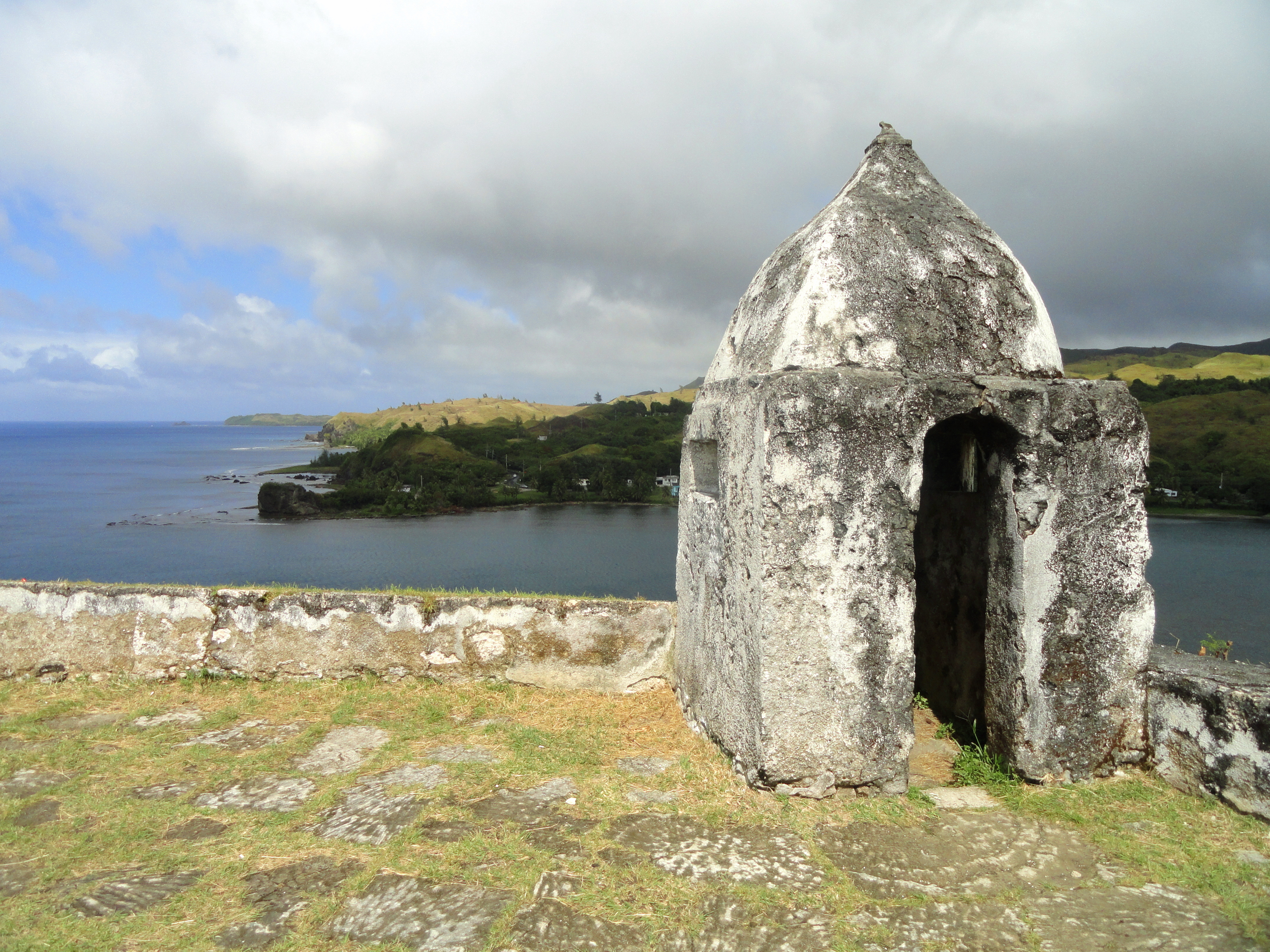

- Location within Guam
- Nearest city: Umatac, Guam
- Coordinates: 13°17′36″N 144°39′27″E
- Area: 8 acres (3.2 ha)
- Built: c.1802-1819
- NRHP reference No.: 74002042
- Added to NRHP: October 18, 1974

Fort Nuestra Señora de la Soledad (Spanish: Fuerte de Nuestra Señora de la Soledad) is a fortification near Umatac, Guam. Built by the Spanish probably between 1802 and 1819, it was the fourth of four fortifications that protected an anchorage for galleons transiting between Acapulco, Mexico and the Philippines, a route that fell out of use in 1815 with Mexican independence.

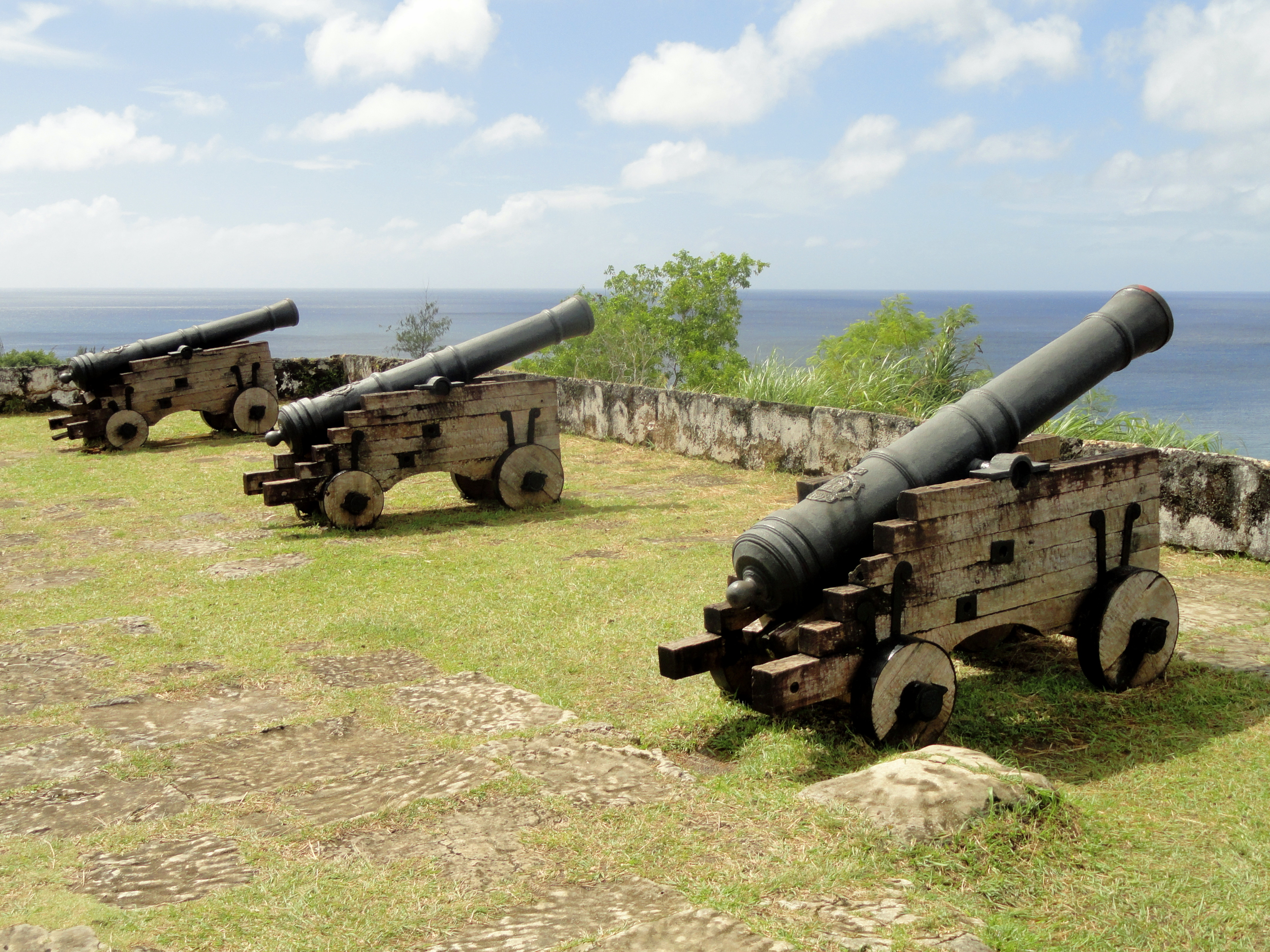

The fort has been damaged by treasure-hunters; it was made into a park following World War II. It was listed on the National Register of Historic Places in 1974.
