= World Waveski Surfing Titles =

Waveski championship

Tournament information
- Sport: Waveski
- Established: 1984
- Administrator: World Waveski Surfing Association

The World Waveski Surfing Titles is the premier waveski championship organised by the World Waveski Surfing Association, with the recognition of the International Canoe Federation. The competition has been held since 1984 irregularly, with a span of 1–4 years between competitions. Having the full recognition of the ICF since 2018, this discipline is eligible to participate in the Olympic Games or World Games.

== Medallists ==
Year	Place	Category	Gold	Silver	Bronze
1984	(South Africa) Cape Town	Men	John Christensen (AUS)		
1986	(United States) Diamond Head	Men	John Christensen (AUS)		
1986	(United States) Diamond Head	Women	Tracey Sassen (RSA)		
1988	(Australia) Yamba	Men	John Christensen (AUS)		
1988	(Australia) Yamba	Women	Kareen Campbell (AUS)		
1989	(United Kingdom) Cornwall	Men	Rees Duncan (AUS)		
1989	(United Kingdom) Cornwall	Women	Tracey Sassen (RSA)		
1990	(United States) Huntington Beach	Men	Stewart Lawson (AUS)		
1990	(United States) Huntington Beach	Women	Natalee Fuhrmann (AUS)		
1991	(Australia) Gold Coast	Men	Rees Duncan (AUS)		
1991	(Australia) Gold Coast	Women	Natalee Fuhrmann (AUS)		
1992	(France) Pointe de la Torche	Men	Craig Harbern (RSA)		
1992	(France) Pointe de la Torche	Women	Natalee Fuhrmann (AUS)		
1993	(South Africa) East London	Men	John Christensen (AUS)		
1993	(South Africa) East London	Women	Lisa Ryan (AUS)		
1994	(New Zealand) Gore Bay	Men	Neil Decker (AUS)		
1994	(New Zealand) Gore Bay	Women	Lisa Ryan (AUS)		
1995	(France) Lacanau	Men	Michael Orsmond (RSA)		
1995	(France) Lacanau	Women	Lisa Ryan (AUS)		
1996	(South Africa) Durban	Men	Munro Kendrick (RSA)	Nicki Carstens (RSA)	Alistair MacLeod (RSA)
1996	(South Africa) Durban	Women	Lisa Ryan (AUS)	Tracey Sassen (RSA)	Lindi Le Roux (RSA)
1997	(Australia) Gold Coast	Men	John Christensen (AUS)		
1997	(Australia) Gold Coast	Women	Lisa Ryan (AUS)		
1998	(United Kingdom) Cornwall	Men	Manu Gendron (FRA)		
1998	(United Kingdom) Cornwall	Women	Marie Gueguen (FRA)		
1999	(Brazil) Florianópolis	Men	Nick Boon (AUS)		
1999	(Brazil) Florianópolis	Women	Caroline Angibaud (FRA)		
2000	(South Africa) Jeffreys Bay	Men	Nicki Carstens (RSA)		
2000	(South Africa) Jeffreys Bay	Women	Caroline Angibaud (FRA)		
2001	(Spain) Bakio	Men	Darren Kearns (AUS)		
2001	(Spain) Bakio	Women	Caroline Angibaud (FRA)		
2002	(Australia) Gold Coast	Men	Dave Dinning (AUS)		
2002	(Australia) Gold Coast	Women	Tracey Sassen (RSA)		
2003	(Guadeloupe) Le Moule	Men	Mathieu Babarit (FRA)		
2003	(Guadeloupe) Le Moule	Women	Caroline Angibaud (FRA)		
2004	(Brazil) Florianópolis	Men	Neil Decker (AUS)		
2004	(Brazil) Florianópolis	Women	Caroline Angibaud (FRA)		
2006	(South Africa) Durban	Men	Mathieu Babarit (FRA)		
2006	(South Africa) Durban	Women	Caroline Angibaud (FRA)		
2007	(New Zealand) Gisborne	Men	Rees Duncan (AUS)	Mathieu Babarit (FRA)	Lance Milnes (AUS)
2007	(New Zealand) Gisborne	Women	Caroline Angibaud (FRA)		
2009	(Australia) Coffs Harbour	Men	Rees Duncan (AUS)		
2009	(Australia) Coffs Harbour	Women	Caroline Angibaud (FRA)		
2011	(Portugal) Santa Cruz	Men	Virgile Humbert (FRA)		
2011	(Portugal) Santa Cruz	Women	Sandra Pienaar (RSA)		
2014	(South Africa) Durban	Men	Renan Leloutre (FRA)		
2014	(South Africa) Durban	Women	Sandra Pienaar (RSA)		
2016	(Portugal) Santa Cruz	Men	Virgile Humbert (FRA)		
2016	(Portugal) Santa Cruz	Women	Olivia Floch (FRA)		
2018	(Spain) Valdoviño	Men	Rees Duncan (AUS)	Virgile Humbert (FRA)	Odel Etxeberria (ESP)
2018	(Spain) Valdoviño	Women	Océane Lucas (FRA)	Mel Farthing (AUS)	Marie Tessier (FRA)
2022	(United States) Ventura	Men	Cyril Samson (FRA)	Virgile Humbert (FRA)	Rees Duncan (AUS)
2022	(United States) Ventura	Women	Lou Peter (FRA)	Océane Lucas (FRA)	Lucy McQueen-Jones (GBR)
2024	(South Africa) East London	Men	Virgile Humbert (FRA)	Clement Guilbert (FRA)	Rees Duncan (AUS)
2024	(South Africa) East London	Women	Lou Peter (FRA)	Océane Lucas (FRA)	Lucy McQueen-Jones (GBR)
