= List of shipwrecks in December 1860 =

The list of shipwrecks in December 1860 includes ships sunk, foundered, wrecked, grounded, or otherwise lost during December 1860.

== 1 December ==
List of shipwrecks: 1 December 1860
Ship	State	Description
Concordia	Hamburg	The brig was abandoned 50 nautical miles (93 km) south of the Falkland Islands. She was on a voyage from Rio de Janeiro, Brazil to San Francisco, California, United States.
Jeune Aglae	France	The lugger was wrecked at Pentewan, Cornwall, United Kingdom. Her crew were rescued.
Phœnix	United Kingdom	The brig ran aground on the Sprat Sands, in the English Channel off the coast of Devon. She was on a voyage from South Shields, County Durham to Teignmouth, Devon. She was refloated with assistance from a tug and taken in to Teignmouth in a leaky condition.
Security	United Kingdom	The barque was abandoned off "New Trinidad". Her fourteen crew survived. She was on a voyage from Montreal, Quebec, Province of Canada, British North America to Liverpool, Lancashire.

== 2 December ==
List of shipwrecks: 2 December 1860
Ship	State	Description
Euphemia	United Kingdom	The brig was driven ashore at Sunderland, County Durham and severely damaged. Her crew were rescued. She was on a voyage from Ipswich, Suffolk to Seaham, County Durham.
Hoffnung	Hamburg	The brig sank off Terschelling, Friesland, Netherlands. She was on a voyage from Swansea, Glamorgan, United Kingdom to Hamburg.
Huntingdon Packet	United Kingdom	The schooner was wrecked at Stranton, County Durham. Her crew were rescued by the Hartlepool Lifeboat. She was on a voyage from Lyme Regis, Dorset to Hartlepool, County Durham.
Max	United Kingdom	The ship capsized in the North Sea. Her crew survived. She was on a voyage from Stralsund to London.
Minerva	United Kingdom	The ship struck the pier and was damaged at Hartlepool. She was on a voyage from Rouen, Seine-Inférieure to Hartlepool. She was taken in to Hartlepool in a leaky condition.
Prodroma	United Kingdom	The snow ran aground on the East Gase Sandbank, in the North Sea off the coast of County Durham and was wrecked. Her eleven crew were rescued by the Seaton Lifeboat. She was on a voyage from Hamburg to Middlesbrough, Yorkshire.
Providence	United Kingdom	The sloop was driven ashore at Sunderland. Her crew were rescued. She was on a voyage from Boston, Lincolnshire to Sunderland. She had become a wreck by 4 December.
Robert	United Kingdom	The schooner struck the Seaton Sea Rocks, on the coast of Northumberland and sank. Her crew were rescued by a coble. She was on a voyage from Dunkirk, Nord, France to Blyth, Northumberland.
Sarah	United Kingdom	The schooner was holed by her anchor and sank at Hartlepool.

== 3 December ==
List of shipwrecks: 3 December 1860
Ship	State	Description
Aden	Norway	The derelict ship was driven ashore at Peterhead, Aberdeenshire, United Kingdom.
Betsey	United Kingdom	The fishing lugger ran aground on Scroby Sands, Norfolk and capsized with the loss of seven lives. She was assisted in to Great Yarmouth, Norfolk the next day.
Ekea Maria	Kingdom of Hanover	The galiot was driven ashore on Vlieland, Friesland, Netherlands. Her crew were rescued. She was on a voyage from Kolding, Denmark to London, United Kingdom.
Emerald	United Kingdom	The ship ran aground at West Hartlepool, County Durham.
Endeavour	United Kingdom	The sloop was abandoned in the North Sea 40 nautical miles (74 km) south east of the Farne Lighthouse, Northumberland. Her crew were rescued by Ariadne ( Rostock). Endeavour was on a voyage from Thornham, Norfolk to Newcastle upon Tyne, Northumberland.
Frances Ann	United Kingdom	The brig struck the pier at Hartlepool, County Durham and sank. She was on a voyage from London to Hartlepool.
Hebe	United Kingdom	The schooner was driven ashore at Spurn Point, Yorkshire. She was on a voyage from King's Lynn, Norfolk to West Hartlepool. Hebe was refloated and found to be leaky. She was consequently beached at Grimsby, Lincolnshire.
Honour	United Kingdom	The brigantine was driven ashore and wrecked on the Rintosa Rocks, near Aarhus, Denmark. Her six crew survived. She was on a voyage from Königsberg, Prussia to London. She was declared a total loss.
Hugh	United Kingdom	The brig was driven ashore at Tynemouth, Northumberland. Her crew were rescued by rocket apparatus. She was on a voyage from Southampton, Hampshire to Newcastle upon Tyne, Northumberland. She was refloated on 15 December and taken in to Tynemouth.
Juno	United Kingdom	The ship was driven ashore at Tynemouth. Her crew were rescued by rocket apparatus.
Lady Abercrombie	United Kingdom	The derelict ship was driven ashore at Peterhead.
Lady Anne	United Kingdom	The ship ran aground at West Hartlepool. She was refloated and taken in to West Hartlepool.
Lark	United Kingdom	The brig was run down and sunk in the Humber by the steamship Kieff (Russia) with the loss of two of her crew. The survivors were rescued by Kieff. Lark was on a voyage from Grimsby to London.
Launceston	(United Kingdom of Great Britain and Ireland) Tasmania	The ship was driven ashore at Queenscliff, New South Wales.
Nicolai Daniel	Russia	The brig was wrecked in the Orkney Islands, United Kingdom with the loss of all hands. She was on a voyage from Riga to Limerick, United Kingdom.
Sarah	United Kingdom	The sloop sank at West Hartlepool.
Tasmanian	United Kingdom	The steamship was driven ashore on the coast of the Isle of Wight. She was on a voyage from Southampton, Hampshire to the West Indies. She was refloated the next day and put back to Southampton.
Vancouver	United Kingdom	The barque-rigged steamship was driven ashore at Santa Ana, Cape Verde Islands. Her fifteen crew survived. She was on a voyage from Liverpool, Lancashire to Miramichi, New Brunswick, British North America. She was declared a total loss.
Wrangel	Flag unknown	The brig ran aground at West Hartlepool. She was on a voyage from Brest, Finistère, France to Hartlepool. She was refloated and taken in to West Hartlepool.

== 4 December ==
List of shipwrecks: 4 December 1860
Ship	State	Description
Albion	Norway	The schooner foundered off "Brekaress" with the loss of all three crew. She was on a voyage from Portsmouth, Hampshire, United Kingdom to Christiania.
Bellona	United Kingdom	The ship departed from Constantinople, Ottoman Empire for Falmouth, Cornwall. No further trace, presumed foundered with the loss of all hands.
City of Lincoln	United Kingdom	The full-rigged ship was abandoned in the Atlantic Ocean with the loss of one of her nineteen crew. Survivors were rescued by Acadia (United Kingdom). City of Lincoln was on a voyage from Quebec City, Province of Canada, British North America to Penarth, Glamorgan.
Freja	Sweden	The schooner was abandoned in the Atlantic Ocean. Her crew were rescued by HNLMS Reteh (Royal Netherlands Navy). Freja was on a voyage from Newcastle upon Tyne, Northumberland, United Kingdom to Venice, Kingdom of Lombardy–Venetia.
Hermann	Russia	The ship ran aground on the Newcombe Sand, in the North Sea off the coast of Suffolk, United Kingdom. She was on a voyage from Riga to Liverpool, Lancashire, United Kingdom. She was refloated and taken in to Lowestoft, Suffolk.
John Byron	United Kingdom	The schooner was driven ashore and wrecked 14 nautical miles (26 km) north of Aberdeen. Her crew were rescued. She was on a voyage from Banff, Aberdeenshire to Kragerø, Norway.
Nancy	United Kingdom	The waterlogged ship was driven ashore and wrecked south of Flamborough Head, Yorkshire. She was on a voyage from Lowestoft, Suffolk to South Shields, County Durham.
Nueva Estella	Spain	The brigantine departed from Saint John's, Newfoundland, British North America for Alicante. No further trace, presumed foundered with the loss of all hands, possibly on 6 December.

== 5 December ==
List of shipwrecks: 5 December 1860
Ship	State	Description
Caucasian	United Kingdom	The barque was abandoned in the Indian Ocean off Mauritius with the loss of one of her 25 crew. She was on a voyage from Akyab, Burma to a British port.
Compere	France	The schooner ran aground in Loch Don. She was on a voyage from Newcastle upon Tyne, Northumberland to Dublin, United Kingdom. She was refloated on 25 May and towed in to Oban, Argyllshire, United Kingdom in a wrecked condition.
Elisa	Duchy of Holstein	The schooner foundered in the North Sea. Her crew were rescued. She was on a voyage from Newcastle upon Tyne to Fredrikshald, Norway.
Harmonie	Sweden	The schooner sprang a leak and sank in the Atlantic Ocean (45°11′N 11°01′W). Her eight crew were rescued by the brig Malmö (Sweden). Harmonie was on a voyage from Newcastle upon Tyne to Messina, Sicily.
Jane and Mary	United Kingdom	The schooner collided with the schooner Mary Edmonds (United Kingdom and sank in the Bristol Channel off Nash Point, Glamorgan with the loss of three of her four crew.
New York Packet	United Kingdom	The barque was wrecked on the Little Bahama Bank, off Bermuda. Her thirteen crew survived. She was on a voyage from New York, United States to Sydney, New South Wales.
Norway	United Kingdom	The ship ran aground on the Pluckington Bank, in Liverpool Bay.
Queen	United Kingdom	The steamship struck the pier at Lowestoft, Suffolk and was holed. She was on a voyage from Seville, Spain to Hamburg.

== 6 December ==
List of shipwrecks: 6 December 1860
Ship	State	Description
Autkje	Netherlands	The galiot foundered in the North Sea. Her crew were rescued. She was on a voyage from Leith, Lothian, United Kingdom to Hamburg.
Marie Helena	Kingdom of Hanover	The ship ran aground on the Haisborough Sands, in the North Sea off the coast of Norfolk, United Kingdom. She was on a voyage from Grangemouth, Stirlingshire, United Kingdom to the River Lea. She was refloated and assisted in to Great Yarmouth, Norfolk in a leaky condition.
Neptune	United Kingdom	The ship sprang a leak and was beached at Ilfracombe, Devon, where she sank.
Zephyr	United Kingdom	The ship ran ashore on the Isle of Whithorn, Wigtownshire. She was on a voyage from Glasgow, Renfrewshire to Wigtown.

== 7 December ==
List of shipwrecks: 7 December 1860
Ship	State	Description
Ann Parry	United States	The barque ran aground on a rock in Appletree Cove.
Earl of Canterbury	United Kingdom	The barque was driven ashore at Odesa.
Eclipse	United Kingdom	The ship was destroyed by fire in the Lymington River. All 30 people on board were rescued. She was on a voyage from Southampton, Hampshire to Madeira.
James	United Kingdom	The schooner was driven ashore and wrecked at Seaton Sluice, County Durham. She was on a voyage from Seaton Sluice to London.
Norton	United Kingdom	The ship was wrecked at São José de Coroa Grande, Brazil. Her crew were rescued. She was on a voyage from Cardiff, Glamorgan to Maranhão, Brazil.

== 8 December ==
List of shipwrecks: 8 December 1860
Ship	State	Description
America	United States	African Slave Trade: The slaver was wrecked on Lobos Key. All on board, more than 500 people, were rescued by a French schooner.
Gloria	Denmark	The smack was driven ashore and wrecked on Heligoland. Her crew were rescued. She was on a voyage from Newcastle upon Tyne, Northumberland, United Kingdom to Altona.
Lucie	United Kingdom	The brigantine was driven ashore at Spital Point, Northumberland. She was on a voyage from Bremen to Hartlepool, County Durham. She was refloated with assistance from a tug and taken in to Berwick upon Tweed, where she struck the pier and damaged her stern.
Magdalene	United Kingdom	The barque departed from Richibucto, New Brunswick, British North America for Liverpool, Lancashire. No further trace, presumed foundered with the loss of all hands.
New York	United States	The ship ran aground on the Manzanilla Reef and was wrecked. She was on a voyage from Manzanilla, Trinidad to London, United Kingdom.
Oberon	United Kingdom	The ship ran aground off the Pass A L'Outre Lighthouse, Louisiana, United States. She was on a voyage from New Orleans, Louisiana to Liverpool.
Orion	United Kingdom	The ship ran aground on the Ship Gurge Sand, in the Hooghly River. She was on a voyage from Liverpool to Calcutta, India. She was refloated but ran aground on the Hog River Sand.

== 9 December ==
List of shipwrecks: 9 December 1860
Ship	State	Description
Erin-go-Bragh	United Kingdom	The barque was abandoned in the Atlantic Ocean. Her eighteen crew were rescued by Great Britain (United Kingdom). She was on a voyage from Quebec City, Province of Canada, British North America to Sharpness, Gloucestershire. Erin-go-Bragh came ashore at Black Head, County Galway on 9 January 1861. She was refloated on 11 February and towed in to Galway.
Manzanilla	United States	The ship was wrecked on Sandy Cay, off the Bahamas. She was on a voyage from Cuba to Falmouth, Cornwall, United Kingdom.
Neptune	United Kingdom	The ship ran aground at Rangoon, Burma. She was on a voyage from Rangoon to London.
St. John	United Kingdom	The hulk caught fire and sank at Gibraltar.

== 10 December ==
List of shipwrecks: 10 December 1860
Ship	State	Description
Fingalton	United Kingdom	The barque was abandoned in the Atlantic Ocean. Her 21 crew were rescued by Statesman ( (United Kingdom of Great Britain and Ireland) ). Fingalton was on a voyage from Quebec City, Province of Canada, British North America to Liverpool, Lancashire.
Joseph Jones	United Kingdom	The full-rigged ship was lost 16 nautical miles (30 km) from the Pass A L'Outre Lighthouse, Louisiana, United States. Her crew were rescued. She was on a voyage from Cardiff, Glamorgan to New Orleans, Louisiana.
Marie Aline	France	The ship was driven ashore 6 to 12 leagues (18 to 36 nautical miles (33 to 67 km) from Cocanada, India. She was on a voyage from Colombo, Ceylon to Cocanada. She subsequently became a wreck.
Mary	(United Kingdom of Great Britain and Ireland) Saint Helena	The ship was abandoned in the Atlantic Ocean. Her crew were rescued by Rosevean (United Kingdom).
Washington	United Kingdom	The barque foundered in the Mediterranean Sea off Sardinia with the loss of one of her eight crew. Survivors were rescued by Pera (United Kingdom). Washington was on a voyage from Odesa to Queenstown, County Cork.

== 11 December ==
List of shipwrecks: 11 December 1860
Ship	State	Description
Cygnet	United Kingdom	The brig foundered in the Atlantic Ocean. Her twelve crew were rescued by Echo (United Kingdom). Cygnet was on a voyage from the Cape of Good Hope, Cape Colony to London.
E. Jacobs	United States	The ship sprang a leak in the Atlantic Ocean ans was abandoned. Her crew were rescued by Carnatic (United Kingdom). E. Jacobs was on a voyage from New York to Liverpool, Lancashire, United Kingdom.
Lord Warriston	United Kingdom	The full-rigged ship was wrecked on Anticosti Island, Nova Scotia, British North America. Her 36 crew survived. She was on a voyage from Montreal, Province of Canada, British North America to Liverpool.
Marion Zagury	United Kingdom	The schooner was driven ashore on São Miguel Island, Azores with the loss of a crew member.
Primrose	United Kingdom	The ship was wrecked on the Doom Bar. Her crew were rescued.

== 12 December ==
List of shipwrecks: 12 December 1860
Ship	State	Description
Argawim	Norway	The barque was driven ashore at Ryhope, County Durham, United Kingdom. Her crew were rescued. She was on a voyage from Quebec City, Province of Canada, British North America to Sunderland, County Durham, United Kingdom. Argawim was refloated with the assistance of several tugs and taken in to Sunderland.
Eliza	United Kingdom	The ship struck an anchor and sank at Yarmouth, Isle of Wight. She was on a voyage from Southampton, Hampshire to Yarmouth. She was refloated but found to be in a wrecked condition.
Hellechina	United Kingdom	The galiot ran aground on the Kentish Knock and sank with the loss of her captain. Four survivors were rescued from the wreck on 14 December by the lugger Lively (United Kingdom). Hellechina was on a voyage from Hull, Yorkshire to Bilbao, Spain.
Phœbe	(United Kingdom of Great Britain and Ireland) Nevis	The sloop was driven ashore and wrecked on the south east point of Nevis. She was on a voyage from Montserrat to Nevis.
Plantin	Belgium	The brig foundered in the Atlantic Ocean. Her crew survived. She was on a voyage from Newcastle upon Tyne, Northumberland, United Kingdom to Permambuco, Brazil.
Reward	United Kingdom	The ship ran aground on the Longsand, in the North Sea off the coast of Essex. Her crew took to a boat and got on board the Kentish Knock Lightship ( Trinity House), from where they were rescued by the lugger Princess Alice (United Kingdom). Reward was on a voyage from Hartlepool, County Durham to Shoreham-by-Sea, Sussex.
Vulcan	United Kingdom	The ship was driven ashore and damageed at Hellevoetsluis, Zeeland, Netherlands. She was on a voyage from Newcastle upon Tyne, Northumberland to Dordrecht, South Holland, Netherlands. She was refloated and resumed her voyage.

== 13 December ==
List of shipwrecks: 13 December 1860
Ship	State	Description
Clementina	United Kingdom	The brig was run into by HMS Sandfly (Royal Navy) and sank in the North Sea off the Mouse Lightship ( Trinity House). Her crew were rescued by HMS Sandfly.
Isaac Walton	United States	The ship was wrecked at Pulo Gadung, Netherlands East Indies.
Selina	United Kingdom	The barque ran aground at Cardiff, Glamorgan.
Stag	(United Kingdom of Great Britain and Ireland) Cape Colony	The coaster sank off Cape Town.
Venus	United Kingdom	The ship foundered in the English Channel off Deadman Point, Cornwall. Her crew were rescued. She was on a voyage from St. John's, Newfoundland, British North America to Plymouth, Devon and/or Liverpool, Lancashire.
White Squall	(United Kingdom of Great Britain and Ireland) Cape Colony	The coaster sank off the Cape of Good Hope.

== 14 December ==
List of shipwrecks: 14 December 1860
Ship	State	Description
Argus	United Kingdom	The schooner was run down by the brig Norval (United Kingdom) off the coast of County Durham. Her crew were rescued. Argus was on a voyage from Aberdeen to Newcastle upon Tyne, Northumberland. she was subsequently beached near North Shields, County Durham.
Ariel	Denmark	The brig sank at Korshamn, Norway. Her crew were rescued. She was on a voyage from St. Ubes, Portugal to Helsingør.
Auguste	Hamburg	The galiot foundered off Texel, North Holland, Netherlands. Her crew were rescued by Johannes and 29 July (Flags unknown). Auguste was on a voyage from Middlesbrough, Yorkshire to Cuxhaven.
Black Diamon	United Kingdom	The steamship was driven ashore at Sunderland, County Durham. She was refloated.
Daring	(United Kingdom of Great Britain and Ireland) Antigua	The schooner collided with Barbuda ( (United Kingdom of Great Britain and Ireland) Barbuda). She was abandoned the next day in a waterlogged condition. Her crew were rescued by Barbuda. Daring was on a voyage from Antigua to Nevis.
Marmion	United Kingdom	The ship was driven ashore at Berdyansk, Russia.
Ocean	United Kingdom	The ship was lost "in the Sillen". Her crew survived. She was on a voyage from Newcastle upon Tyne to Hamburg.
Speranza	Kingdom of Sardinia	The barque was driven ashore at the Landguard Fort, Felixtowe, Suffolk, United Kingdom. She was on a voyage from London to South Shields, County Durham. She was refloated and resumed her voyage.
Taranaki	United Kingdom	The ship was wrecked on "Proby Island".
William and Isabella	United Kingdom	The ship foundered in the North Sea (25 nautical miles (46 km) off St. Abbs Head, Berwickshire. Her crew were rescued by the schooner Lisette (Spain). William and Isabella was on a voyage from Sunderland, County Durham to London.

== 15 December ==
List of shipwrecks: 15 December 1860
Ship	State	Description
Alice Frazier	United States	The barque was driven out to sea by ice just outside of Luzhin Bay in the northern Sea of Okhotsk. The crew were forced to spend the winter at the Russian settlement of Ena, 120 miles away. The crew were rescued by several whaleships the following season.
Auguste	United Kingdom	The ship foundered in the North Sea off Texel, North Holland, Netherlands. Her crew were rescued by Johannes (Netherlands) and Twenty-ninth of July (United Kingdom).
Canton	United Kingdom	The barque was abandoned in the Atlantic Ocean. Her fourteen crew survived.
Caribbean	United Kingdom	The transport ship ran aground on a reef in Hope Sound. She was refloated and towed in to Hong Kong by HMS Woodcock (Royal Navy).
Daring	United Kingdom	The schooner was abandoned off Nevis. She was on a voyage from Antigua to Nevis.
Eagle	United Kingdom	The steamship was driven ashore south of Flamborough Head, Yorkshire. She was on a voyage from London to the River Tyne. She was refloated on 14 January 1861 and was towed in to Bridlington, Yorkshire the next day. She subsequently sank there, but was refloated and placed under repair.
Florence	United Kingdom	The brigantine was driven ashore by ice at Charlottetown, Prince Edward Island, British North America.
Golconda	United Kingdom	The ship was driven ashore on Crooked Island, Bahamas. Her sixteen crew survived. She was on a voyage from St. Jago de Cuba, Cuba to Swansea, Glamorgan.
Jenny Lind	United Kingdom	The schooner was driven ashore at Church Point, Nova Scotia, British North America. She was later refloated.

== 16 December ==
List of shipwrecks: 16 December 1860
Ship	State	Description
Bertha Frederiecke	Prussia	The ship was driven ashore and wrecked on Anholt, Denmark. Her crew were rescued. She was on a voyage from Newcastle upon Tyne, Northumberland, United Kingdom to Swinemünde.
Cognac Packet	United Kingdom	The brig was wrecked on the North Gar Sand, in the North Sea off the coast of County Durham. Her crew were rescued.
Eliza	United Kingdom	The brig ran aground on the North Gar Sand and was wrecked. Her seven crew were rescued by the Seaton Carew Lifeboat. She was on a voyage from Middlesbrough, Yorkshire to London.
Erve	Malta	The brig collided with the full-rigged ship Catherine (United Kingdom) and was abandoned off Penarth, Glamorgan, United Kingdom. Her crew were rescued by Catherine (United Kingdom). Erve was subsequently towed in to Penarth by Cartharine.
Grampian	United Kingdom	The ship was abandoned in the Atlantic Ocean 35 nautical miles (65 km) north west of Faial Island, Azores. Her crew were rescued by Alma (United Kingdom). Grampian was on a voyage from Savannah, Georgia, United States to the Clyde.
Jerome	(United Kingdom of Great Britain and Ireland) British North America	The barque was abandoned off Newfoundland with the loss of three of her crew. Survivors were rescued by General Parkhill (Flag unknown). Jerome was on a voyage from Halifax, Nova Scotia to Liverpool, Lancashire.
New Forest	United Kingdom	The barque sprang a leak and foundered. All on board survived. She was on a voyage from "Anatam" to New Caledonia.
Reward	United Kingdom	The ship ran aground on the Longsand, in the North Sea off the coast of Essex and was abandoned. Her crew were rescued.
Victoria	United Kingdom	The schooner ran aground on Scroby Sands, Norfolk. She was on a voyage from Seaham, County Durham to Southampton, Hampshire.

== 17 December ==
List of shipwrecks: 17 December 1860
Ship	State	Description
Anne Catherina	Sweden	The schooner was driven ashore at Scarborough, Yorkshire, United Kingdom. She was on a voyage from Newcastle upon Tyne, Northumberland, United Kingdom to Gothenburg. She was refloated with the assistance of the steamship Xanthe (United Kingdom) and taken in to Scarborough, where she sank.
Argus	United Kingdom	The ship was driven ashore at Flamborough Head, Yorkshire. She was on a voyage from South Shields, County Durham to London. She was refloated and taken in to Grimsby, Lincolnshire in a leaky condition.
Balmoral	United Kingdom	The ship ran aground on the Maasdroogen, off the Dutch coast.
BAP Callao	Peruvian Navy	The frigate and the floating dock she was in sank at San Lorenzo Island with the loss of 100 lives. She was refloated on 16 April 1863 and beached. Subsequently repaired and returned to service as BAP Apurímac.
Castle Eden	United Kingdom	The brig ran aground on the Haisborough Sands, in the North Sea off the coast of Norfolk. She was on a voyage from South Shields to London. She was refloated and resumed her voyage.
Earl of Shaftesbury	United Kingdom	The ship was driven ashore at Odesa. She was later refloated with assistance from a tug.
Fairy	United Kingdom	The schooner was driven ashore and severely damaged east of Tarifa, Spain. She was on a voyage from Valencia, Spain to London. She was refloated with the assistance of the tug Adelia (United Kingdom and towed in to Gibraltar.
Fortuneo	Spain	The brig was abandoned in the Atlantic Ocean (43°19′N 32°20′W). Her crew were rescued by St. Nicholas (France). Fortuneo was on a voyage from Newfoundland, British North America to Málaga.
Globe	United Kingdom	The brig capsized at Jarrow, County Durham.
John and Ann	United Kingdom	The schooner was wrecked on the Barber Sand, in the North Sea off the coast of Norfolk. Her ten crew were rescued by the Caistor Lifeboat. She was on a voyage from Whitby, Yorkshire to Littlehampton, Sussex.
Lady of the Lake	United Kingdom	The ship was driven ashore in Goswick Bay, Northumberland. She was on a voyage from Dundee, Forfarshire to Seaham, County Durham. She was refloated on 29 December and towed in to Berwick upon Tweed, Northumberland.
Liverpool	United Kingdom	The brigantine was driven ashore and wrecked 10 nautical miles (19 km) north of Azemmour, Morocco. Her seven crew survived. She was on a voyage from Lisbon, Portugal to Mazagan, Morocco.
McLeod	United Kingdom	The ship ran aground on the Haisborough Sands, in the North Sea off the coast of Norfolk and was wrecked. Her crew survived.
Ravensworth	United Kingdom	The ship was driven ashore at Messina, Sicily. She was on a voyage from Messina to Leith, Lothian. She was refloated and put back to Messina.
Ulrica	Russia	The brig ran aground on the Goodwin Sands, Kent, United Kingdom. She was refloated with the assistance of the Walmer Lifeboat and other vessels.

== 18 December ==
List of shipwrecks: 18 December 1860
Ship	State	Description
Arche d'Alliance	France	The brigantine was wrecked in the Chausée de Sein. She was on a voyage from Swansea, Glamorgan, United Kingdom to Nantes, Loire-Inférieure.
Grace Gordon	United States	The ship was abandoned in the Atlantic Ocean. Her crew were rescued by Katherine (United Kingdom).
Hercules	United Kingdom	The barque was abandoned in the Atlantic Ocean. Her fourteen crew survived. She was on a voyage from Quebec City, Province of Canada, British North America to Liverpool, Lancashire.
Hoidsfeldt, and Meta	Denmark	The schooners collided in the North Sea. Hoidsfeldt sank. Her crew were rescued by Meta, which was severely damaged. She was abandoned the next day. All on board were rescued by Christian ( Wismar).
HMS Janus	Royal Navy	The Clown-class gunboat was driven ashore at Shanghai, China.
Orion	United States	The full-rigged ship ran aground and was wrecked in the Hooghly River. She was on a voyage from Liverpool to Calcutta, India.
Philotine	France	The brig was wrecked at Gravelines, Nord with the loss of all hands. She was on a voyage from Dunkirk, Nord to Newcastle upon Tyne, Northumberland, United Kingdom.
Pigeon	(United Kingdom of Great Britain and Ireland) Cape Colony	The ship was driven ashore at the Cape of Good Hope.
Richmond	United Kingdom	The schooner sank at the mouth of the Petapico with the loss of eight of her crew.
Saxonville	United Kingdom	The ship was driven ashore on Georges Island, Massachusetts, United States. She was on a voyage from London to Boston, Massachusetts. She was refloated.
Sonne	Hamburg	The ship was wrecked at "Berdange", Sweden. She was on a voyage from Kalmar, Sweden to the Firth of Forth.
Stag	(United Kingdom of Great Britain and Ireland) Cape Colony	The ship was driven ashore at the Cape of Good Hope.
White Squall	(United Kingdom of Great Britain and Ireland) Cape Colony	The ship was driven ashore at the Cape of Good Hope.

== 19 December ==
List of shipwrecks: 19 December 1860
Ship	State	Description
Chance	(United Kingdom of Great Britain and Ireland) Jersey	The brigantine was wrecked in the Gulf of Gioja with the loss of two of her eight crew. She was on a voyage from Naples, Kingdom of the Two Sicilies to Gallipoli, Ottoman Empire.
Crown	United Kingdom	The sloop was driven ashore at Waterloo, Lancashire. She was on a voyage from Wigtown to Liverpool, Lancashire.
Earl of Moray	United Kingdom	The schooner was wrecked near the entrance of the Caen Canal. Her five crew survived. She was on a voyage from Llanelly, Glamorgan to Caen, Calvados, France.
Granville et Bordeaux	France	The schooner ran aground on Taylor's Bank, in Liverpool Bay and capsized with the loss of four lives. She was on a voyage from Liverpool to Granville, Manche.
James Hunt	United Kingdom	The brig was driven ashore and wrecked at Kingstown, County Dublin.
Johanna Christine	Sweden	The ship was wrecked on the Dvaleground. She was on a voyage from Copenhagen, Denmark to Christiania, Norway.
Malabar	United Kingdom	The ship ran aground on the Lee Bank, off the coast of British Guiana. She was on a voyage from Demerara, British Guiana to Queenstown, County Cork.
Olga	Russia	The schooner was wrecked on Skagen, Denmark. She was on a voyage from Rio de Janeiro, Brazil to "Borgria".
Orion	Hamburg	The galiot was abandoned 18 nautical miles (33 km) off Beachy Head, Sussex, United Kingdom. Her crew were rescued by the fishing boat No. 3 (France)). Orion was on a voyage from Newcastle upon Tyne, Northumberland, United Kingdom to Alexandria, Egypt.
Thomas Hutchinson	United Kingdom	The ship was abandoned in the Atlantic Ocean. Her twelve crew were rescued by Alert (United Kingdom). Thomas Hutchinson was on a voyage from Shediac, New Brunswick, British North America to Liverpool.

== 20 December ==
List of shipwrecks: 20 December 1860
Ship	State	Description
Ætna	United Kingdom	The ship departed from Trieste for a British port. No further trace, presumed foundered with the loss of all hands.
Alida	Belgium	The barque ran aground on the Pluckington Bank, in Liverpool Bay. She was on a voyage from Liverpool, Lancashire, United Kingdom to Ostend, West Flanders. She was refloated and put back to Liverpool.
Freia	Prussia	The schooner was wrecked in the Dogger Bank, in the Irish Sea. Her six crew took to the lifeboat and were rescued by the Wexford Lifeboat. She was on a voyage from Königsberg to Dublin, United Kingdom.
Hartley	United States	The ship ran aground on Sandy Key, off the Bahamas and was subsequently destroyed by fire. She was on a voyage from Mobile, Alabama to Boston, Massachusetts.
Isabella Fisher	United Kingdom	The schooner ran aground on the Skull Martin Rocks, off the coast of County Down and was wrecked. She was on a voyage from Ardrossan, Ayrshire to Newport, Monmouthshire.
Jessie Miller	United Kingdom	The brig was abandoned in the Atlantic Ocean. Her fourteen crew were rescued by Blue Nose (United Kingdom). Jessie Miller was on a voyage from Chaleur Bay to Carmarthen.
Mathilda	Sweden	The ship was wrecked on the Thistle Rocks. She was on a voyage from Landskrona to London, United Kingdom.
Pilot	United States	The cargo schooner went ashore near Chabham Camp, Nova Scotia. and became a total loss. Crew saved.
Quickstep	United Kingdom	The brig was abandoned in the Atlantic Ocean with the loss of four of her nine crew. Survivors were rescued by the full-rigged ship Flora (United Kingdom). Quickstep was on a voyage from New York, United States to Saint John, New Brunswick, British North America.
Royal Albert	United Kingdom	The ship was driven ashore east of Osbourne House, Isle of Wight. She was on a voyage from London to Southampton, Hampshire, the Cape of Good Hope, Cape Colony and Calcutta, India. Royal Albert was refloated the next day and taken in to Southampton.
Wilhelm Tell	Norway	The ship was wrecked at Thisted, Denmark. Her crew were rescued. She was on a voyage from Dundee, Forfarshire, United Kingdom to Arendal.

== 21 December ==
List of shipwrecks: 21 December 1860
Ship	State	Description
Bertha	Prussia	The barque was driven ashore and wrecked on Rügen. She was on a voyage from Sunderland, County Durham, United Kingdom to Stettin.
Bristol	United Kingdom	The brig foundered in the Bay of Biscay. Her nine crew were rescued by the brigantine Henriette Don (Prussia). Bristol was on a voyage from Agrigento, Sicily to Liverpool, Lancashire.
Jane Cargill	United Kingdom	The barque ran aground off the coast of Essex. She was on a voyage from Hamburg to Montevideo, Uruguay. She was refloated with the assistance of five fishing smacks and taken in to Sheerness, Kent.
Mary Wylie	United Kingdom	The brig collided with the barque West Indian (United Kingdom) and sank in the English Channel off Beachy Head, Sussex. Her six crew were rescued by West Indian. Mary Wylie was on a voyage from Bangor, Caernarfonshire to Sunderland, County Durham.
Ostfia	Flag unknown	The ship was driven ashore and damaged near Roquetas, Spain. She was on a voyage from Constantinople, Ottoman Empire to Queenstown, County Cork, United Kingdom. She was refloated and taken in to Málaga, Spain.
Rival	United Kingdom	The ship ran aground on the Swanage Ledge, in the English Channel off the coast of Dorset. She was on a voyage from Antwerp, Belgium to Dublin. She was refloated on 23 December.
Thomas Hand	United Kingdom	The ship capsized and was wrecked at Dublin.

== 22 December ==
List of shipwrecks: 22 December 1860
Ship	State	Description
Courier	United Kingdom	The brig ran aground on the Red Bank, off Bathurst, Gambia Colony and Protectorate. She was on a voyage from London to Bathurst.
Fredereika	Stralsund	The ship was driven ashore and wrecked on Rügen, Prussia. Her crew were rescued.
Kingston	United Kingdom	The barque was driven ashore between New Romney and Dungeness, Kent. She was on a voyage from London to Algoa Bay. She was refloated the next day, found to be leaky and was taken in to Dover, Kent.
Maine	France	The ship was wrecked at Grand-Camp, Seine-Inférieure. She was on a voyage from Newcastle upon Tyne, Northumberland, United Kingdom to Lorient, Morbihan.
Ocean Monarch	United Kingdom	The full-rigged ship foundered in the Atlantic Ocean. Her 42 crew were rescued by Mackinaw (United States). Ocean Monarch was on a voyage from Montreal, Province of Canada, British North America to Liverpool.
Ocean Traveller	United Kingdom	The ship departed from Baltimore, Maryland, United States for Liverpool. Subsequently foundered. Wreckage from the ship washed up at Cape Henry, Virginia in early January 1861.
Otto	Denmark	The ship was abandoned in the Atlantic Ocean. Her crew were rescued by John Brooks (United Kingdom). Otto was on a voyage from Ceará, Brazil to an English port.

== 23 December ==
List of shipwrecks: 23 December 1860
Ship	State	Description
Elizabeth	(United Kingdom of Great Britain and Ireland) British North America	The ship was wrecked at Grand River, Nova Scotia. She was on a voyage from Saint John's, Newfoundland to Sydney, Nova Scotia.
Gleaner	United Kingdom	The schooner capsized and sank in the Bay of Mazagan with the loss of two of her six crew. She was on a voyage from Mazagan, Morocco to Queenstown, County Cork.
Julie and Marie	France	The polacca was driven ashore west of Almería, Spain. Her crew were rescued.
Nanette	United Kingdom	The barque was wrecked near Victoria, Virgin Islands. Her fourteen crew survived. She was on a voyage from London to Vancouver Island.
Nathaniel	United Kingdom	The ship was driven ashore at Dungeness Kent. She was on a voyage from Hamburg to Dublin.
Thomas Lowry	United Kingdom	The full-rigged ship foundered in the Indian Ocean 360 nautical miles (670 km) south east of Rodrigues 20°30′S 66°20′E). Her 24 crew survived; fourteen reached Rodrigues, the remainder were rescued by Boston Light (United States) on 30 December. Thomas Lowry was on a voyage from Greenock, Renfrewshire to Kurrachee, India.
Tweed	United Kingdom	The ship ran aground at Tonsberg, Duchy of Holstein. She was on a voyage from Middlesbrough, Yorkshire to Leer, Kingdom of Hanover.
Twin Brothers	United Kingdom	The ship departed from London for Newcastle upon Tyne. No further trace, presumed foundered with the loss of all hands.

== 24 December ==
List of shipwrecks: 24 December 1860
Ship	State	Description
Alfa	United Kingdom	The ship was wrecked at Madeira. She was on a voyage from Fleetwood, Lancashire to Port-au-Prince, Haiti.
Anna	United Kingdom	The brig was damaged by fire at New York, United States.
Fulvia	Kingdom of Sardinia	The ship was driven ashore on Ponza, Kingdom of the Two Sicilies. She was on a voyage from Alexandria, Egypt to Livorno. She subsequently became a wreck.
Recife	United Kingdom	The barque was abandoned in the Atlantic Ocean with the loss of one of her 21 crew. Survivors were rescued by Ayrshire Lass (United Kingdom). Recife was on a voyage from Cardiff, Glamorgan to Bahia, Brazil.

== 25 December ==
List of shipwrecks: 25 December 1860
Ship	State	Description
Balder	Norway	The brig was driven into the schooner Peter and James (United Kingdom) and the brigantine Sarah ( (United Kingdom of Great Britain and Ireland) Jersey) and then drove ashore at Gibraltar.
Bubona	United Kingdom	The brig was abandoned north of the Tusker Rock. Her seven crew were rescued by Gleaner (United Kingdom). Bubona was on a voyage from Ardrossan, Ayrshire to Havre de Grâce, Seine-Inférieure, France.
Diana	United Kingdom	The ship sank in the Elbe near Otterndorf. She was on a voyage from Middlesbrough, Yorkshire to Cuxhaven.
Laurel	United Kingdom	The tug sprang a leak and foundered in the English Channel off Dover, Kent. She was on a voyage from London to Plymouth, Devon.
Missionary	United Kingdom	The ship was destroyed by fire whilst on a voyage from Hobart, Tasmania to Sydney, New South Wales.
Ruby	United Kingdom	The derelict brig was driven ashore at Rosslare Harbour, County Wexford.
Starling	United Kingdom	The brig ran aground on the Newcombe Sand, in the North Sea off the coast of Suffolk. She was refloated and resumed her voyage.
Trial	United Kingdom	The schooner was driven ashore 10 nautical miles (19 km) east of Almería, Spain. She was on a voyage from Saint John's, Newfoundland, British North America to Genoa, Kingdom of Sardinia. She was refloated on 10 January 1861 and taken in to Almería.

== 26 December ==
List of shipwrecks: 26 December 1860
Ship	State	Description
Anne	United Kingdom	The ship was driven ashore and wrecked at Youghal, County Cork with the loss of all hands.
Diana	(Russian Empire) Grand Duchy of Finland	The schooner was wrecked in Ardmore Bay with the loss of five of her seven crew. Survivors were rescued by the Ardmore Lifeboat, which was severely damaged in the rescued operation.
Harriet	United Kingdom	The schooner was wrecked near Weymouth, Dorset. Her three crew survived. She was on a voyage from Saint-Valery-sur-Somme, Somme, France to Portsmouth, Hampshire.
Susannah	United Kingdom	The ship ran aground in the Ems. She was on a voyage from Emden, Kingdom of Hanover to London. She was refloated.

== 27 December ==
List of shipwrecks: 27 December 1860
Ship	State	Description
Emma	United Kingdom	The full-rigged ship was beached in the New Inlet, near Wilmington, Delaware, United States. Her 36 crew survived. She was on a voyage from Bombay, India to New York, United States. She was destroyed by fire on 1 January 1861.
Erina	Sweden	The full-rigged ship was wrecked at Portland, Dorset, United Kingdom. Her crew were rescued but a pilot drowned. She was on a voyage from Sundsvall to Bristol, Gloucestershire, United Kingdom.
Harriet	United Kingdom	The ship was wrecked near Weymouth, Dorset. Her crew were rescued.
Nanette	United Kingdom	The barque was wrecked at Victoria, Colony of British Columbia. Her crew were rescued. She was on a voyage from London to Victoria.
Pegasus	Kingdom of Hanover	The schooner was sunk by ice at the entrance to the Mariager Fjord. Her crew were rescued. She was on a voyage from Hull, Yorkshire, United Kingdom to Aalborg, Denmark.
William	United Kingdom	The brig was abandoned in the North Sea off the Farne Islands.

== 28 December ==
List of shipwrecks: 28 December 1860
Ship	State	Description
Cidade do Porto	Portugal	The ship was wrecked in the Douro.
Emma	United Kingdom	The ship was driven ashore 4 nautical miles (7.4 km) from Cape Fear, North Carolina, United States. Her crew were rescued. She was on a voyage from Liverpool, Lancashire to New York, United States.
Fé	Portugal	The full-rigged ship was wrecked at the mouth of the Douro. She was on a voyage from Newcastle upon Tyne, Northumberland, United Kingdom to Porto.
Flor do Porto	Portugal	The full-rigged ship was wrecked at the mouth of the Douro.
Golden Star	United Kingdom	The brig was wrecked in Bannow Bay with the loss of twenty of the 27 people on board. She was on a voyage from Mobile, Alabama, United States to Liverpool, Lancashire.
Hartwick	United States	The ship was driven ashore in the Scheldt by ice. She was on a voyage from Antwerp, Belgium to Hartlepool, County Durham, United Kingdom. She was refloated and put back to Antwerp in a leaky condition.
Hedwig	Sweden	The schooner was wrecked at the mouth of the Douro.
Juno	Kingdom of Hanover	The ship sank in the North Sea. Her crew were rescued. She was on a voyage from Newcastle upon Tyne, Northumberland, United Kingdom to Hamburg.
Linda Russiana	Brazil	The full-rigged ship was wrecked at the mouth of the Douro.
Underley	United Kingdom	The barque foundered off Cape Agulhas, Cape Colony. Her fourteen crew survived. She was on a voyage from Sunderland, County Durham to Galle, Ceylon.

== 29 December ==
List of shipwrecks: 29 December 1860
Ship	State	Description
Albert	France	The lugger was wrecked on the Rousse Rock, in the English Channel off the coast of Seine-Inférieure. Her crew were rescued. She was on a voyage from Cardiff, Glamorgan, United Kingdom to Nantes, Loire-Inférieure.
Bee	United Kingdom	The schooner was driven ashore at St. Mawes, Cornwall. She was on a voyage from Plymouth Devon to São Miguel Island, Azores. She had been refloated by 3 January 1861 and taken in to Falmouth, Cornwall.
Francis	United Kingdom	The schooner was driven ashore at Dunbar, Lothian. Her crew were rescued. She was on a voyage from South Shields, County Durham to Burntisland, Fife. She was refloated on 14 January 1861.
Golden Star	United States	The full-rigged ship was driven ashore and wrecked at Fethard-on-Sea, County Wexford, United Kingdom with the loss of nineteen of the 26 people on board. She was on a voyage from Mobile, Alabama to Liverpool, Lancashire, United Kingdom.
Lydia	United Kingdom	The ship was driven ashore at Ballinamona, County Wexford. She had become a wreck by 5 January 1861.
Maria Louisa	Argentina	The schooner was wrecked near Colonia del Sacramento, Uruguay. Her crew were rescued. She was on a voyage from Montevideo to Mercedes, Uruguay.
New Pelton	United Kingdom	The steamship departed from Llanelly, Glamorgan for Havre de Grâce, Seine-Inférieure. Subsequently foundered with the loss of all hands; a piece of wreckage from the ship washed up on the Irish coast in late January 1861.
Orient	United Kingdom	The schooner was driven ashore at Dunbar. Her crew were rescued. She was on a voyage from Burghead, Moray to Hartlepool, County Durham. She was refloated on 14 January 1861 and found to be severely damaged.
San Constantino	Flag unknown	The brig was driven ashore 8 nautical miles (15 km) north east of Varna, Ottoman Empire. Her crew were rescued.
Speedwell	United Kingdom	The schooner was driven ashore and wrecked in Cawsand Bay with the loss of all five crew. She was on a voyage from St Germans, Cornwall to Cardiff, Glamorgan.
Zebra	United Kingdom	The steamship struck submerged piles and sank in the River Thames at Deptford, Kent. She was on a voyage from London to Gibraltar and Malta. She was refloated on 7 January 1861 and taken in to Deptford Dockyard for repairs, having suffered severe damage to her bottom.

== 30 December ==
List of shipwrecks: 30 December 1860
Ship	State	Description
Emma	United Kingdom	The full-rigged ship was run ashore and wrecked on the coast of New York, United States. Her crew were rescued. She was on a voyage from Bombay, India to New York City.
Emperor	United Kingdom	The full-rigged ship was driven ashore at Chatham, New Brunswick, British North America. Her twenty crew survived. She was on a voyage from Saint John, New Brunswick to Penarth, Glamorgan.
George Emile	France	The schooner was driven ashore near the Pointe de la Torche, Finistère. Her crew were rescued.
Gloucester	United Kingdom	The brig was driven ashore and wrecked near Filey, Yorkshire. Her seven crew were rescued by the Filey Lifeboat. She was on a voyage from South Shields, County Durham to Southampton, Hampshire.
Industry	United Kingdom	The ship was wrecked at Sunderland, County Durham.
Jean Baptiste	France	The sloop was driven ashore and wrecked at the South Foreland, Kent, United Kingdom with the loss of her captain. She was on a voyage from Dunkirk, Nord to Cherbourg, Seine-Inférieure.
J. Harrison	(United Kingdom of Great Britain and Ireland) British North America	The brig was driven ashore and wrecked at Ship Harbour. She was on a voyage from Bedeque, Prince Edward Island to Liverpool, Lancashire.
Johannes	Bremen	The ship ran aground near the Alte Weser Lighthouse. She was on a voyage from Bo'ness, Lothian, United Kingdom to Bremen. She was refloated on 7 February 1861 and taken in to Fedderwardersiel.
London	United Kingdom	The brig was abandoned in the North Sea off St. Abb's Head, Berwickshire and subsequently sank. Her nine crew were rescued by the schooner Commerce (United Kingdom). London was on a voyage from South Shields, County Durham to Dieppe, Seine-Inférieure, France.
Polifemo	Kingdom of Lombardy–Venetia	The ship was driven ashore and wrecked at Breaksea Point, Glamorgan, United Kingdom. Her crew were rescued. She was on a voyage from Cardiff, Glamorgan to Venice.
Prospect	United Kingdom	The schooner foundered off Coquet Island, Northumberland. Her crew were rescued. She was on a voyage from South Shields to Boulogne, Pas-de-Calais, France.
Riverdale	United Kingdom	The full-rigged ship was abandoned in the Atlantic Ocean. Her 24 crew were rescued by St. Croix (United Kingdom). Riverdale was on a voyage from Saint John, New Brunswick to Hull, Yorkshire.
Seagull	United Kingdom	The brig was driven ashore and wrecked 4 nautical miles (7.4 km) south of Dunbar, Lothian. Her crew were rescued. She was on a voyage from Leith, Lothian to Sunderland.
Shepherd	United Kingdom	The ship was driven ashore and wrecked at Middleton, County Durham. She was on a voyage from Hartlepool to London.
Volusia	United Kingdom	The schooner was driven ashore and wrecked at Sunderland. Her crew were rescued. She was later refloated and taken in to Sunderland.

== 31 December ==
List of shipwrecks: 31 December 1860
Ship	State	Description
Brothers	United Kingdom	The brig was wrecked near Cape Kilia, Ottoman Empire with the loss of all hands.
Dulce Nombre de Jesus	Spain	The full-rigged ship was wrecked at Morte Point, Devon, United Kingdom with the loss of four of her crew. She was on a voyage from Havana, Cuba to Bristol, Gloucestershire, United Kingdom.
Earl of Durham	United Kingdom	The ship was driven ashore at Crawfordsburn, County Down and was abandoned by her crew. She was on a voyage from Maryport, Cumberland to Belfast, County Antrim.
Garibaldi	United Kingdom	The ship was driven ashore in the Dardanelles. She was on a voyage from Galaţi, Ottoman Empire to Falmouth, Cornwall. She was refloated.
Industrie	Kingdom of Hanover	The ship was driven ashore at Dunbar.
John Wright	United Kingdom	The schooner was driven ashore at Dunbar. Her crew were rescued. She was on a voyage from Leven, Fife to London.
Maria I????	Flag unknown	The schooner was wrecked at Pendeen, Cornwall, United Kingdom with the loss of all hands. f
Marilla	United Kingdom	The ship was destroyed by fire at Melbourne, Victoria.
Marmion	United States	The barque was abandoned in the Atlantic Ocean. Her crew were rescued by Canova (United Kingdom). Marmion was on a voyage from New York to Londonderry, United Kingdom.
May King	United Kingdom	The brig was wrecked near Karabournou, Ottoman Empire with the loss of all hands.
May Sunshine	United Kingdom	The brig was wrecked near Cape Kilia with the loss of all hands.
Mersey	United Kingdom	The brig was abandoned in the Atlantic Ocean. Her crew were rescued. She was on a voyage from Halifax, Nova Scotia, British North America to Liverpool, Lancashire.
Norval	United Kingdom	The schooner was driven ashore near Weymouth, Dorset. Her five crew survived. She was on a voyage from Honfleur, Manche. France to Plymouth, Devon.
Seagull	United Kingdom	The ship was driven ashore at Kirkwood, Lothian. Her crw were rescued. She was on a voyage from Leith, Lothian to Sunderland, County Durham.
Sourisquois	United Kingdom	The full-rigged ship was driven ashore at Cap d'Alprech, near Boulogne, Pas-de-Calais, France. Her 24 crew survived. She was on a voyage from Bombay, India to a British port. She had become a wreck by 2 January 1861.
Susanna	Norway	The yacht sank off Læsø, Denmark. Her crew were rescued. She was on a voyage from "Greenoe" to Sarpsborg.
Versuch	Norway	The sloop was run into at sea and was abandoned in a sinking condition. Her crew were rescued. She was on a voyage from London to Boston, Lincolnshire, United Kingdom.
William	United Kingdom	The collier, a brig, was driven ashore and wrecked at Tynemouth, Northumberland. Her crew were rescued by the South Shields Lifeboat. She was refloated on 11 January 1861 and taken in to South Shields.

== Unknown date ==
List of shipwrecks: Unknown date in December 1860
Ship	State	Description
Adolph	Flag unknown	The ship was sunk by ice at Saaremaa, Russia, sometime before 27 December.
Alice	United States	The full-rigged ship was abandoned in the Chops of the Channel before 5 December. Her crew were rescued by the barque Faithful (United Kingdom). Alice was on a voyage from New York to London, United Kingdom. She was taken in to the Isles of Scilly, United Kingdom on 7 December.
Bartlett	United States	The barque ran aground at Calcutta, India before 10 December. She was on a voyage from Newcastle upon Tyne, Northumberland, United Kingdom to Calcutta.
Belencita	Spain	The full-rigged ship was wrecked at Cape Spartel, Morocco.
Constance	France	The barque was wrecked at Cape Spartel with the loss of a crew member.
Dee	(United Kingdom of Great Britain and Ireland) Isle of Man	The ship was driven ashore at Laxey. She was later refloated and beached.
Deux Jumeaux	France	The ship struck a rock in the Latao Channel. She was on a voyage from Hong Kong to Macao, China. She was refloated and beached at Kowloon in a sinking condition with assistance from Oriental and Rajah (both United Kingdom).
Flying Fish	(United Kingdom of Great Britain and Ireland) Tasmania	The brigantine was driven ashore and wrecked at Port Elliot, South Australia in early December. She was on a voyage from Hobart to Hobsons Bay, Victoria.
George	Hamburg	The ship was wrecked on the Goodwin Sands, Kent, United Kingdom.
Georges	France	The sloop was driven ashore and wrecked near Dieppe, Seine-Inférieure. Her crew were rescued. She was on a voyage from "Poulneix" to Dieppe.
Helene	United Kingdom	The ship foundered off the coast of Aberdeenshire before 4 December with the loss of all hands. She was on a voyage from Saint Petersburg, Russia to Peterhead, Aberdeenshire.
Hercules	United Kingdom	The ship was abandoned in the Atlantic Ocean. Her crew survived. She was on a voyage from Quebec City, Province of Canada, British North America to London.
Italia	Kingdom of Sardinia	The ship was wrecked near Porto Farina, Beylik of Tunis before 31 December. Her crew were rescued. She was on a voyage from "Gizelly", Algeria to Tunis, Beylik of Tunis.
Jamaica	United Kingdom	The barque was driven ashore near Gallipoli, Ottoman Empire. She was later refloated and taken in to the Dardanelles.
Jean d'Arc	France	The ship sank. She was on a voyage from Newcastle upon Tyne to Limerick, United Kingdom.
Kareaeskakis	Ottoman Empire	The ship was wrecked at Balaklava, Russia before 19 December. She was on a voyage from Taganrog, Russia to Constantinople.
Kingston	United Kingdom	The steamship was wrecked on the Haisborough Sands, in the North Sea off the coast of Norfolk with the loss of all sixteen hands. She was on a voyage from Gothenburg, Sweden to London.
Louis	Netherlands	The ship was wrecked in the Macclesfield Strait. Her crew were rescued. She was on a voyage from Newcastle upon Tyne to Singapore, Straits Settlements.
Lucretia	(United Kingdom of Great Britain and Ireland) British North America	The ship was abandoned 30 nautical miles (56 km) south of Canso, Nova Scotia. Her crew were rescued.
Mary Jane	(United Kingdom of Great Britain and Ireland) British North America	The schooner was wrecked at Westport, Nova Scotia. She was on a voyage from Halifax to Digby.
Millman	United Kingdom	The ship was abandoned in the North Sea off the Farne Islands, Northumberland. She was subsequently taken in to Lindisfarne and was then towed in to Berwick upon Tweed, Northumberland, where she arrived on 7 January 1861.
Munster Lass	United Kingdom	The ship was driven ashore at East London, Cape Colony before 11 December.
Numera de Santander	Spain	The ship was wrecked. She was on a voyage from Manila, Spanish East Indies to Queenstown, County Cork, United Kingdom.
Queen of Martaban	United Kingdom	The brig was abandoned with the loss of two lives. Survivors were rescued by Iskerman and Sardinia (United Kingdom). Queen of Martaban was on a voyage from Moulmein, Burma to Calcutta, India.
Sarah Ellen	United States	Carrying a cargo of stone, the 73-foot (22 m), 40-ton two-masted schooner sank with the loss of two lives in 300 feet (91 m) of water in the middle of Lake Champlain, midway between Burlington, Vermont, and Willsboro, New York, during a winter storm.
Susannah	United Kingdom	The ship was driven ashore on Saaremaa by ice before 27 December.
Vickery	United States	The barque was wrecked in the Strait of Juan de Fuca. She was on a voyage from San Francisco, California, to a port in Victoria, Australia.
William Kirk	United Kingdom	The ship was wrecked in the Torres Strait before 7 December. Her crew were taken to two boats. Four survivors were rescued by HMS Herald (Royal Navy); the remainder reached Kupang, Netherlands East Indies.
