= Onara =

Onara may refer to:

- Onara, Tombolo, Italy
- Onara (book), a Japanese children's book published in 1978
- Onara Peninsula, a peninsula to the east of Luzhin Bay in Magadan Oblast, Russia
- "Onara", the theme song of the South Korean television drama Jewel in the Palace
- Ōnara Stop, former name of Tatsuokajō Station, a train station in Saku, Nagano, Japan
- Onara, a fictional continent in the Dungeons & Dragons campaign setting Arcanis

== See also ==
- Oh Na-ra (born 1977), South Korean actress
