= Miss America 1983 =

American beauty pageant

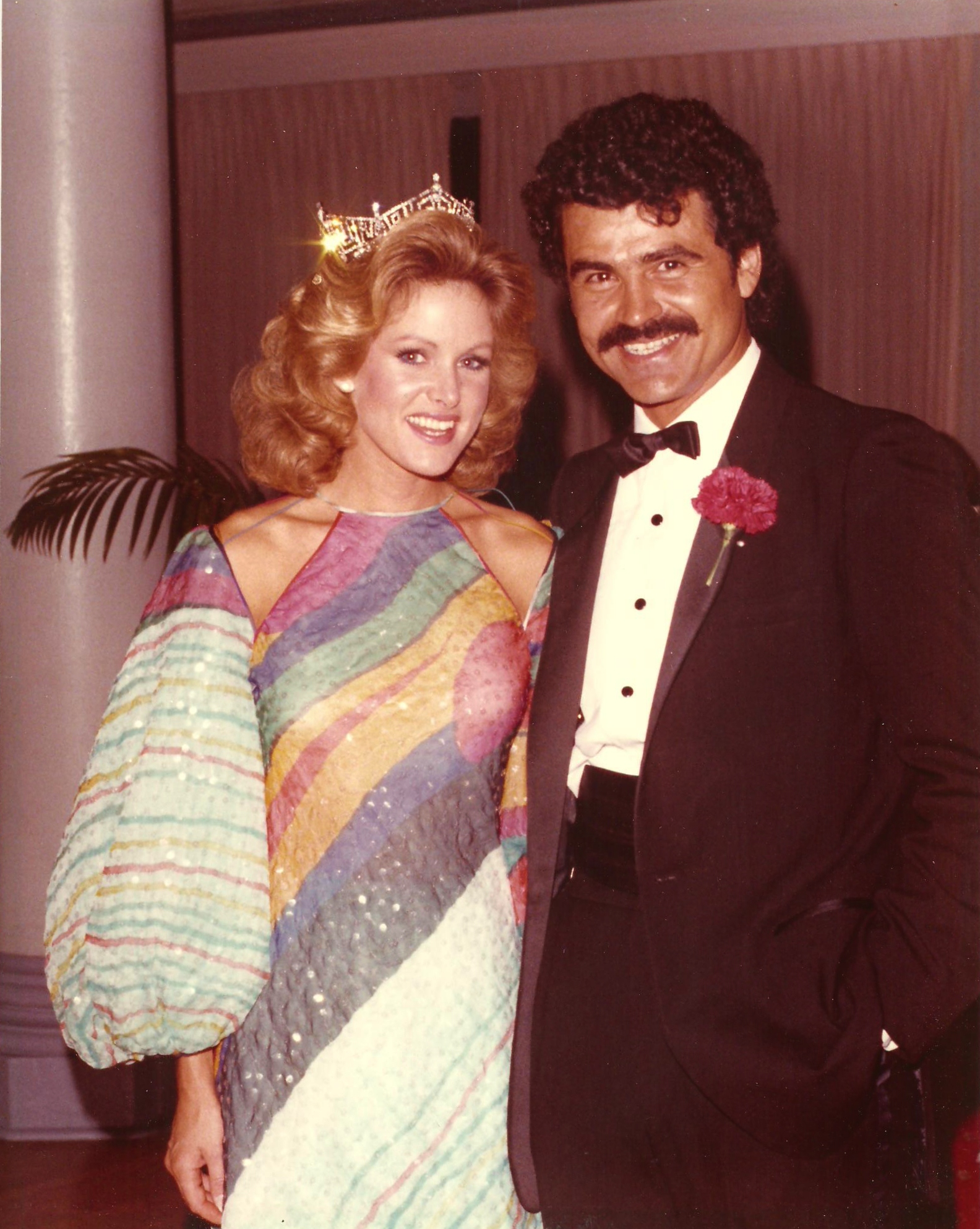
- Debra Maffett, Miss America 1983, and Ronald Letterman
- Date: September 11, 1982
- Presenters: Gary Collins
- Venue: Boardwalk Hall, Atlantic City, New Jersey
- Broadcaster: NBC
- Winner: Debra Maffett; California

Miss America 1983, the 56th Miss America pageant, was broadcast from the Boardwalk Hall in Atlantic City, New Jersey on September 11, 1982 by NBC Network.

Pageant winner Debra Maffett later became a television personality and producer.

== Results ==
=== Placements ===
Placement	Contestant
Miss America 1983	California – Debra Maffett
1st Runner-Up	Tennessee – Desiree Daniels
2nd Runner-Up	Mississippi – Dianne Evans
3rd Runner-Up	Alabama – Yolanda Fernandez
4th Runner-Up	Oklahoma – Nancy Chapman
Top 10	Arizona – Debra Ann Daniels; Arkansas – Mary Stuart; Georgia – Bobbie Eakes; Kentucky – Gwendolyn Suzann Witten; Minnesota – Laurie Saarinen

=== Awards ===
==== Preliminary awards ====
Award	Contestant
Lifestyle and Fitness	California – Debra Maffett; North Carolina – Elizabeth Gray Williams; Tennessee – Desiree Daniels
Talent	California – Debra Maffett; Kentucky – Gwendolyn Suzann Witten; Mississippi – Dianne Evans

==== Non-finalist awards ====
Award	Contestant
Talent	Colorado – Deborah Davids; Iowa – Linda Lee Simon; Louisiana – Bobbie Lynn Candler; New York – Eileen Diane Clark; North Carolina – Elizabeth Gray Williams; South Carolina – Julia Diane Hill; Texas – Gloria Gilbert; Wisconsin – Gail Marie Soller

== Contestants ==
State	Name	Hometown	Age	Talent	Placement	Special Awards	Notes
Alabama	Yolanda Fernandez	Troy	19	Classical Piano, Fantaisie-Impromptu	3rd runner-up		Previously Florida's Junior Miss 1980
Alaska	Kristan Sapp	Wasilla	20	Sac-Jazz Dance			
Arizona	Debra Daniels	Yuma	20	Free Form Gymnastics, "Chariots of Fire"	Top 10		
Arkansas	Mary Stuart	Little Rock	20	Vocal/Broadway Jazz, "The Birth of the Blues"	Top 10		Later cast as Frannie Hughes on As the World Turns from 1990 to 1993
California	Debra Maffett	Anaheim	25	Popular Vocal, "Come in From the Rain"	Winner	Preliminary Lifestyle & Fitness Award Preliminary Talent Award	
Colorado	Deborah Davids	Denver	22	Harp, "Introduction et Allegro" by Maurice Ravel		Non-finalist Talent Award	
Connecticut	Kelly Slater	Woodbury	21	Popular Vocal, "Blue Champagne"			
Delaware	Nancy Ellen Farley	Elsmere	21	Comedy Monologue, "Report of the Nominating Committee"			
Florida	Deanna Pitman	Apopka	22	Lyrical Dance, "I Hope I Get It" from A Chorus Line			
(Georgia (U.S. state)) Georgia	Bobbie Eakes	Warner Robins	21	Vocal, "Let's Hear it for Me" from Funny Lady	Top 10		Sister of Miss Georgia 1979, Sandra Eakes Later starred as Macy Alexander on The Bold and the Beautiful
Hawaii	Gale Lee Thomas	Honolulu	21	Baton Twirling, Theme from Magnum, P.I. & "Hawaiian War Chant"			
Idaho	Lisa Eaton	Shelley	22	Vocal, "It's My Turn"			
Illinois	Jaleigh Jeffers	Mount Carmel	21	Piano, "Bumble Boogie"			
Indiana	Ilona Conway	Bunker Hill	25	Popular Vocal, "Mister Melody"			
Iowa	Linda Simon	DeWitt	23	Baton Twirling		Non-finalist Talent Award	
Kansas	Lisa Marie Berwick	Valley Center	21	Vocal, "Battle Hymn of the Republic"			
Kentucky	Gwendolyn Witten	Vine Grove	23	Semi-classical Vocal, "And This is My Beloved"	Top 10	Preliminary Talent Award	
Louisiana	Bobbie Candler	Baton Rouge	25	Semi-classical Vocal, "With a Song in My Heart"		Non-finalist Talent Award	Previously National Sweetheart 1979
Maine	Rebecca Beck	Brunswick	21	Classical Vocal, "Adele's Laughing Song" from Die Fledermaus			
Maryland	Lynne Carol Graham	Bethesda	23	Popular Vocal, "Alfie"			Mother of Miss Kentucky 2007, Kaitlynne Postel
Massachusetts	Lisa Scorgie	North Attleboro	23	Violin, "Fantasy of Russian Folk Songs"			
Michigan	Kathy Lou Pennington	Jackson	25	Vocal, "God Bless the Child"			
Minnesota	Laurie Saarinen	Osage	21	Vocal, "My Man"	Top 10		Previously Miss North Dakota USA 1981
Mississippi	Dianne Evans	Taylorsville	22	Vocal, "Stormy Weather"	2nd runner-up	Preliminary Talent Award	
Missouri	Julie Phillips	Ava	18	Classical/Jazz Piano			
Montana	Kimberly Knauf	Billings	21	Piano Medley, "Jump Shout Boogie" & "Sonata Pathétique"			
Nebraska	Sandra Haschke	Humphrey	20	Popular Vocal, "All I Ever Need is You"			
Nevada	Kim King	Las Vegas	21	Banjo, "Waiting for the Robert E. Lee"			
New Hampshire	Amy Bowker	Amherst	21	Jazz Dance, "The Music and the Mirror" from A Chorus Line			
New Jersey	Christina Shone	Pequannock	22	Classical Vocal, "Non Piu Mesta" from La Cenerentola			
New Mexico	Cyndi Ann Friesen	Carlsbad	19	Vocal, "Carnival"			
(New York (state)) New York	Eileen Clark	Syracuse	23	Classical Vocal, "Glitter and Be Gay" from Candide		Non-finalist Talent Award	
North Carolina	Elizabeth Williams	Shelby	22	Semi-classical Vocal, "Climb Ev'ry Mountain" from The Sound of Music		Non-finalist Talent Award Preliminary Lifestyle & Fitness Award	
North Dakota	Jeana Wolf	Rugby	21	Tap Dance, "You're a Grand Old Flag" & "Give My Regards to Broadway"			
Ohio	Debra Gombert	Bexley	22	Semi-classical Vocal, "Love is Where You Find It"			
Oklahoma	Nancy Chapman	Altus	21	Piano, "Fireworks" by Debussy	4th runner-up		
Oregon	Laura Matthys	Salem	21	Rifle Twirling Routine, "Herzegovinian March"			
Pennsylvania	Laurie Ann Hixenbaugh	Belle Vernon	22	Baton Twirling, "Pop Goes to the Movies"			
Rhode Island	Cynthia Crook	Warwick	22	Vocal/Dance, Theme from New York, New York			
South Carolina	Julia Hill	Florence	26	Classical Piano, "Rachmaninoff's Piano Concerto No. 2, 3rd Movement"		Non-finalist Talent Award	Mother of Miss South Carolina 2008, Anna Perry
South Dakota	Tara Meyerink	Platte	19	Classical Piano, "Polichinelle" by Sergei Rachmaninoff			
Tennessee	Desiree Daniels	Chattanooga	22	Popular Vocal, "Don't Cry Out Loud"	1st runner-up	Preliminary Lifestyle & Fitness Award	Later Miss Tennessee USA 1984 2nd runner-up at Miss USA 1984
Texas	Gloria Gilbert	Millsap	20	Ventriloquism & Vocal, "I've Been Everywhere"		Non-finalist Talent Award	Previously National Sweetheart 1981 Longtime hostess of the Miss Texas pageant television broadcast
Utah	Cindy Quinn	Provo	21	Classical Vocal, "Habanera" from Carmen			
Vermont	Jill Wyckoff	South Burlington	20	Gymnastics Dance, Theme from CHiPs			
Virginia	Beverly Cooke	Richmond	24	Vocal Medley, "Smile" & "Happy Days are Here Again"			Mother of Miss Virginia's Outstanding Teen 2006, Brittany Young
(Washington (state)) Washington	Monica Hard	Bellevue	23	Vocal Medley, "Sweet Inspiration" & "Where You Lead"			
West Virginia	Kelly Lea Anderson	Clarksburg	21	Stylized Can-Can			Later Miss West Virginia USA 1984 1st runner-up at Miss USA 1984 Later Miss World USA 1984 Top 5 finalist at Miss World 1984
Wisconsin	Gail Marie Soller	La Crosse	24	Classical Vocal, "Mon cœur s'ouvre à ta voix"		Non-finalist Talent Award	
Wyoming	Janie Hertzler	Cheyenne	23	Vocal, "Everything"			
