= Debra Maffett =

American beauty pageant winner

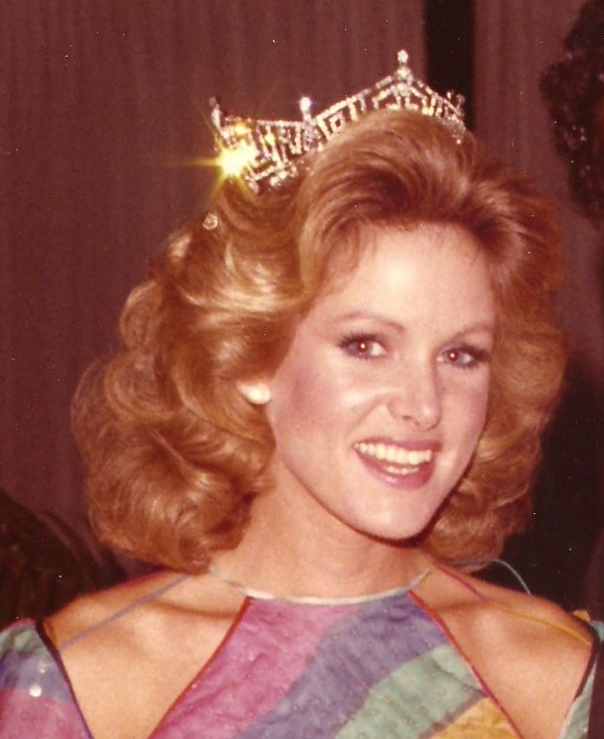
- Maffett in 1983
- Born: November 9, 1956 (age 69)
- Education: University of Houston; Sam Houston State University; Lamar University
- Occupations: Television personality, producer, media consultant, speaker, songwriter, singer
- Title: Miss California 1982; Miss America 1983
- Predecessor: Elizabeth Ward
- Successor: Vanessa Williams
- Spouse: Buster Wilson (deceased 2004)
- Children: 2
- Awards: Emmy Nomination Best Host

Debra Sue Maffett (born November 9, 1956) is an American beauty pageant titleholder from Cut and Shoot, Texas and was named Miss America 1983.

== Early life and education ==
Maffett graduated from S.P. Waltrip High School in Houston, Texas, in 1975.

== Pageantry ==
Although she competed in the Miss Texas pageant several years without winning, she moved to California and was subsequently crowned Miss California 1982. She represented California when she won the Miss America crown. Some controversy arose after it was revealed that Maffett underwent nasal surgery to correct her deviated septum.

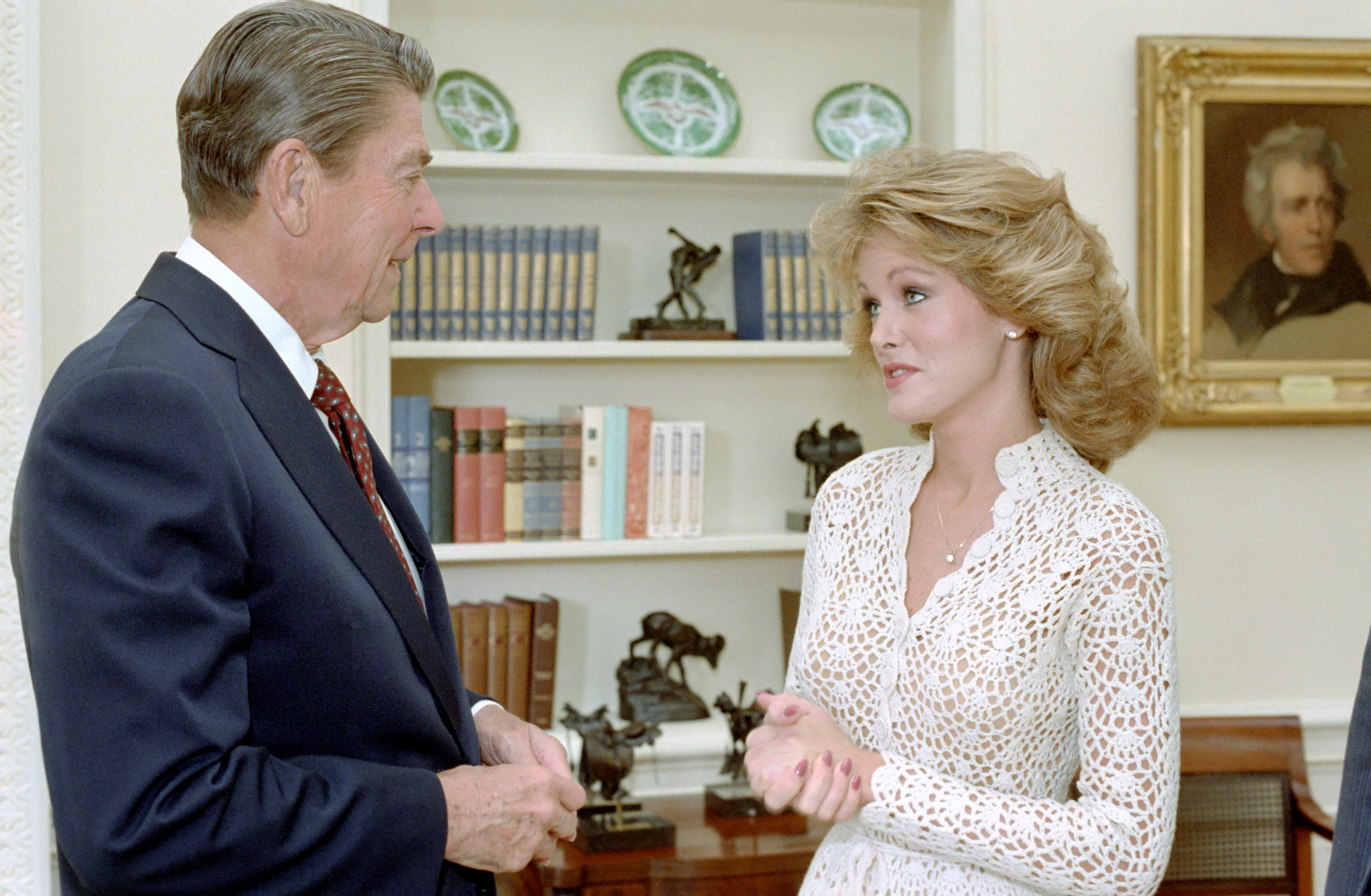
Maffett and Ronald Reagan in the Oval Office in 1982

== Career ==
Maffett served as a host on PM Magazine; NBC and CBS pilots; Guinness Book of World Records with David Frost; Alive and Well; TNN Country News; Hot, Hip and Country; Making Healthy Choices; and The Harvest Show.

In 1984, Maffett appeared as a panelist on several episodes of the Match Game Hollywood Squares Hour.

Maffett appeared in the episode of Matlock that aired December 1, 1987, entitled "The Network", as news anchor Terry McNeil.

== Personal life ==
Maffett was married to singer Buster Wilson, until his death in 2004. Wilson had a daughter, Jenny (born 1990), from a previous relationship. Maffett gave birth to a son, Rydder, in 1996.

Awards and achievements
Preceded by Elizabeth Ward	Miss America; 1983	Succeeded by Vanessa Williams
Preceded by Cheryl Vancleave	Miss California; 1982	Succeeded by Lisa Davenport
