= Luzhin Bay =

Bay in Magadan Oblast, Russia

- Horseshoe Bay
- Бухта Лужина (Russian)
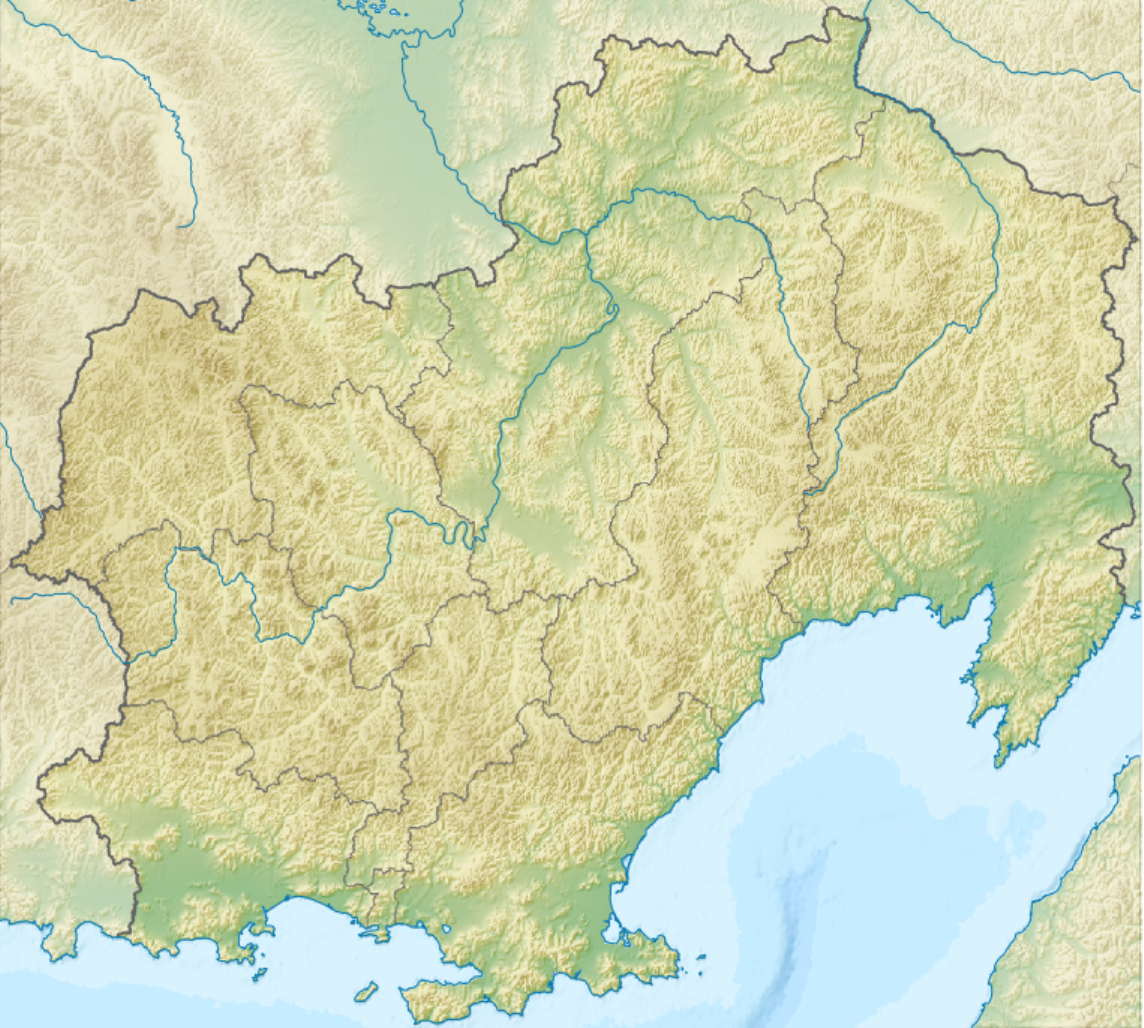
- Location in Magadan Oblast
- Location: Russian Far East
- Coordinates: 59°16′N 147°38′E
- Ocean/sea sources: Sea of Okhotsk
- Basin countries: Russia
- Max. length: 5 km (3.1 mi)
- Max. width: 10 km (6.2 mi)
- Average depth: 9 m (30 ft)

Luzhin Bay (Russian: Бухта Лужина, Bukhta Luzhina) is a bay in Magadan Oblast, Russian Federation. It is named after Russian cartographer Fyodor Luzhin.

== Geography ==
Luzhin Bay is a small, circular bay with high, rocky shores. It lies on the northern coast of the Sea of Okhotsk and is separated from the larger Shelting Bay to the east by the Onara Peninsula. It is entered between Capes Moskvitin to the east and Izmaylov to the west. It has not been surveyed.

== History ==
American whaleships cruised for bowhead whales in the bay in the 1850s and 1860s. They called it Horseshoe Bay. They also anchored in the bay to get wood and water. In 1860, the barque Alice Frazier (406 tons), of New Bedford, attempted to winter in the bay but ice in December parted her chain and then drove her out to sea, forcing the men to winter with the Russians.
