= Pointe de la Torche =

Promontory in Finistère, France

Coordinates: 47°50′12″N 4°21′16″W

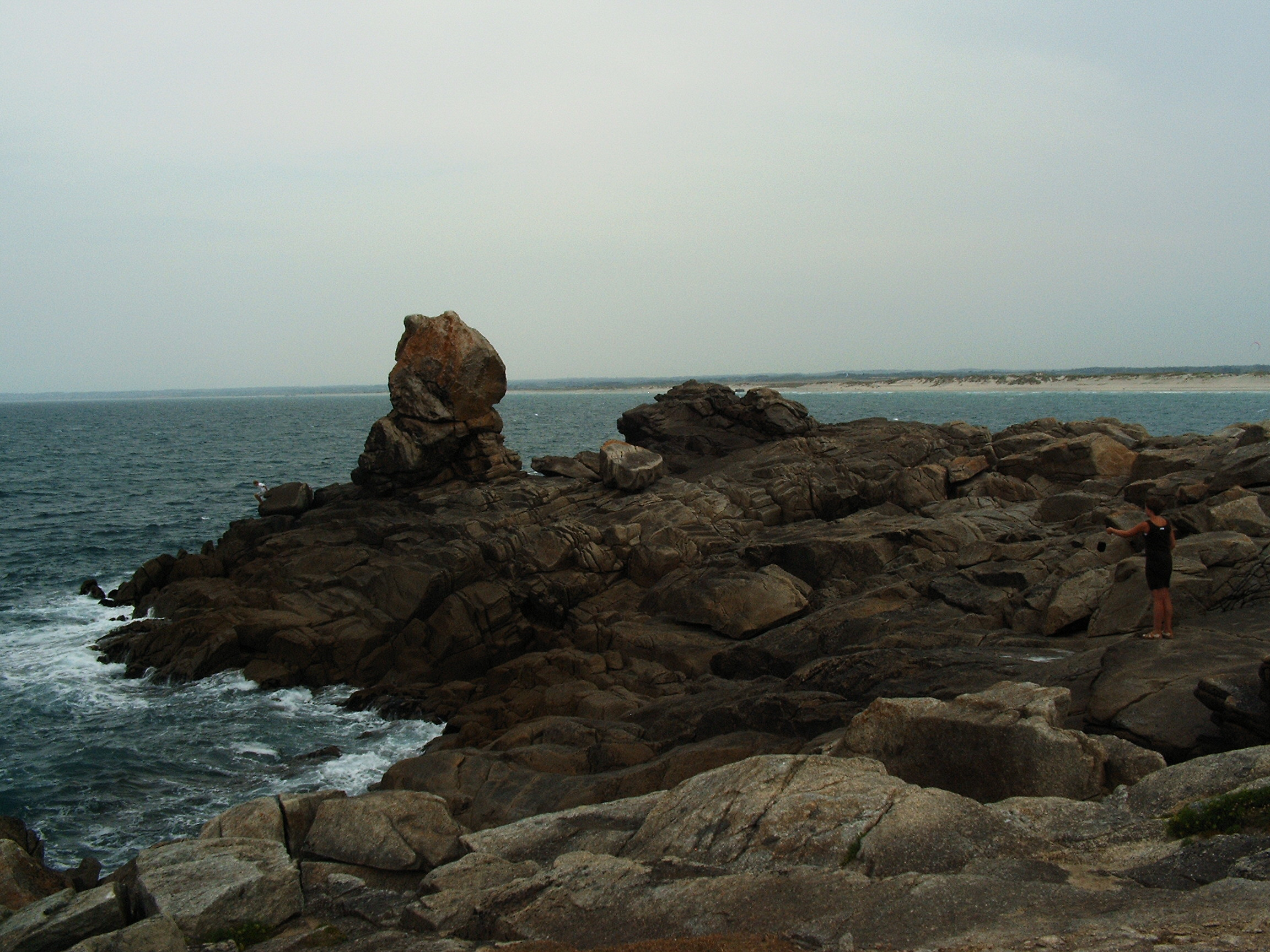
Rocks on Pointe de la Torche, including le rocher du corbeau

Pointe de la Torche (Breton: Beg an Dorchenn) is a promontory at the southeastern end of the Baie d'Audierne in the commune of Plomeur in the Bigouden region of Finistère, France. It is an officially recognised natural site and at the top of the promontory is a prehistoric settlement and burial site that is registered as a historic monument.

== Geography ==
Pointe de la Torche is a rocky granite outcropping; one prominent boulder near the end is called le rocher du corbeau (crow rock or raven rock). Northwards from the promontory, the beach of the community of Tréguennec extends for several kilometres around the Baie d'Audierne to Plozevet. Southwest of the promontory is the beach of Pors-Carn (part of the commune of Penmarc'h), which extends as far as the village of Saint-Guénolé. The point has been an officially recognised natural site since 1965.

During the current geologic era, the Quaternary, the promontory has at times been surrounded by dunes and been an island. Protective barriers have been installed to prevent its being cut off again by the sea, which would otherwise have happened. The surf and currents sometimes make the sea around it very dangerous.

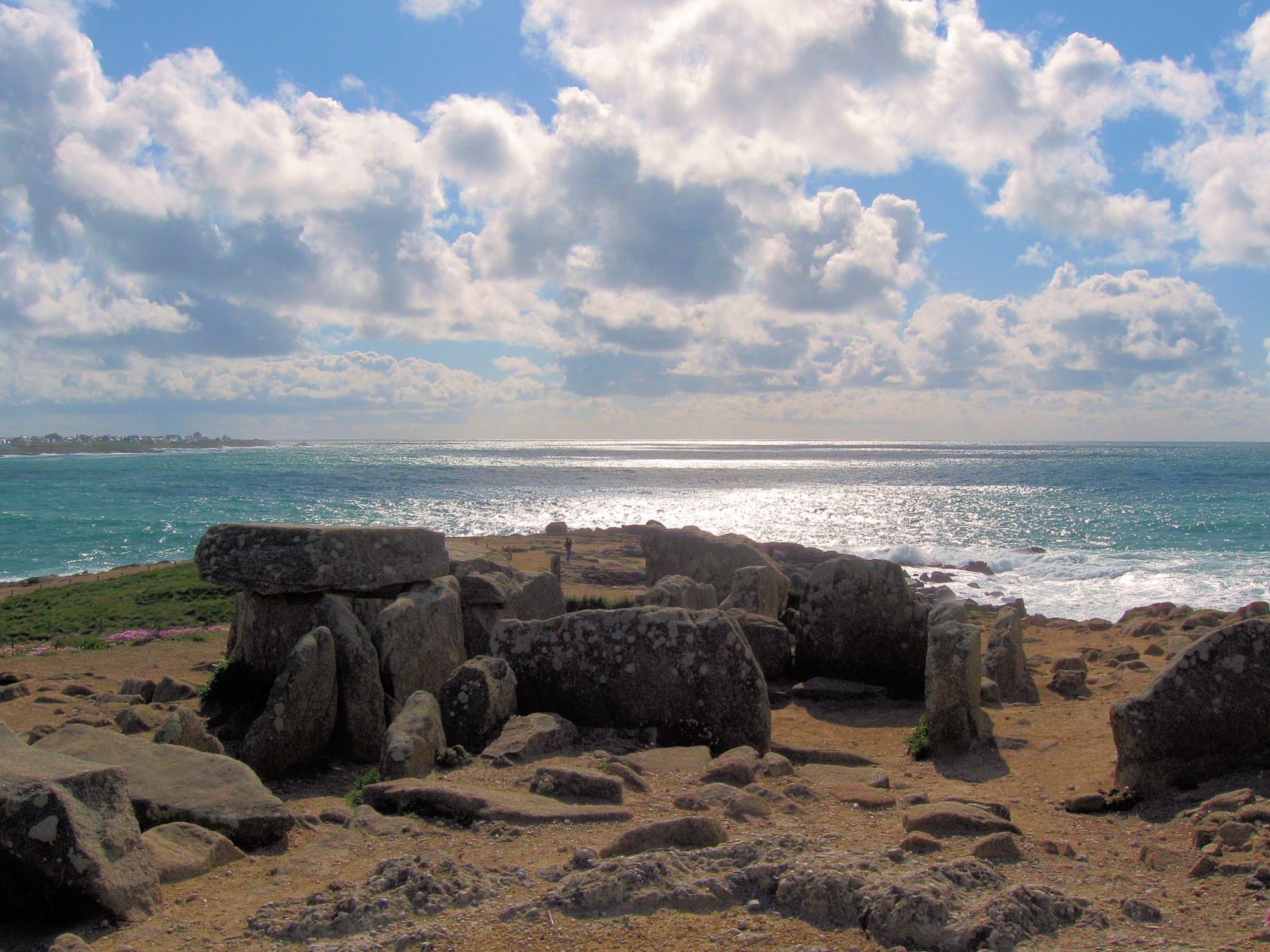
Dolmen

== History ==
The promontory and environs show evidence of human use since the fifth millennium BCE. At the upper end of the promontory is the Pointe de la Torche Dolmen, a tumulus containing several half-buried dolmens, remnants of a multi-chambered Megalithic passage grave. The site was registered as a national heritage site in 1960. Several archaeological digs have taken place at the site. The earliest evidence of human activity on the Pointe de la Torche is a Mesolithic midden on the northeast side, consisting mostly of seashells, with some fish and cattle bones. The burial site was constructed in the Neolithic period with five chambers, four of them arranged symmetrically, and an entrance way which forms an angle and was roofed over in the late Neolithic. Finds from several different eras have been uncovered in the chambers and the corridor, and for reasons of soil chemistry the site was only the third in Brittany to yield prehistoric human remains in significant numbers. Neolithic worked flints and polished axeheads have also been found at Pointe de la Torche, and the sea sometimes uncovers remnants of walls in both rectangular and circular shapes. The point and the nearby dunes are also the site of finds of Bronze Age axes, swords, daggers and pottery, and human skeletons and food debris dating to after the Celtic settlement in the second half of the first millennium BCE. Menhirs have been found in the dunes and at the Kerharo quarry.

Sea level was some 10 metres lower in prehistory, so the promontory would have extended further into the bay and offered excellent views. The Musée de la Préhistoire finistérienne (Museum of Prehistory of Finistère) at Pors Carn, Penmarc'h, has exhibits documenting the finds. It also has displays on the cemetery of Saint-Urnel, a few hundred metres away, where remains of over 100,000 people have been found. This has been determined to be a mediaeval burial ground associated with a chapel and settlement which were abandoned in the 16th century as the dunes encroached. It was declared a historic monument in 1929.

During the Second World War, the Germans constructed fortifications on the Pointe de la Torche, part of the Atlantic Wall. One blockhouse or pillbox was used as a squat by the homeless until the 1980s and is now a rescue station.

The Breton word for a mound, dochen, was identified with French torche, torch, giving rise to the name of the promontory and to a mistaken legend of the local people luring ships onto the rocks at night with lights.

== Uses ==
Pointe de la Torche is accessible by a pedestrian path. It attracts many surfers, body boarders, kitesurfers, wind-surfers, waveskiers and land yachters and has been the site of several championships. There is a good beach, and the promontory is also a location for bass and flatfish angling.

In 1986 the point was the location of a project of light art by Yann Kersalé, Le songe est de rigueur.

== Ornithology ==
In summer, Pointe de la Torche is home to a nesting colony of European bee-eaters.

== Sources ==
- P. du Chatellier. "Exploration de tumuli de Run-Aour et de la Torche en Plomeur (Finistère) et du Kjôkkenmôdding de la Torche". Mémoire de la Sociéte d'Emulation des Côtes-du-Nord 1881. pp. 1–8 (in French)
