= Waveski =

Type of surf kayak

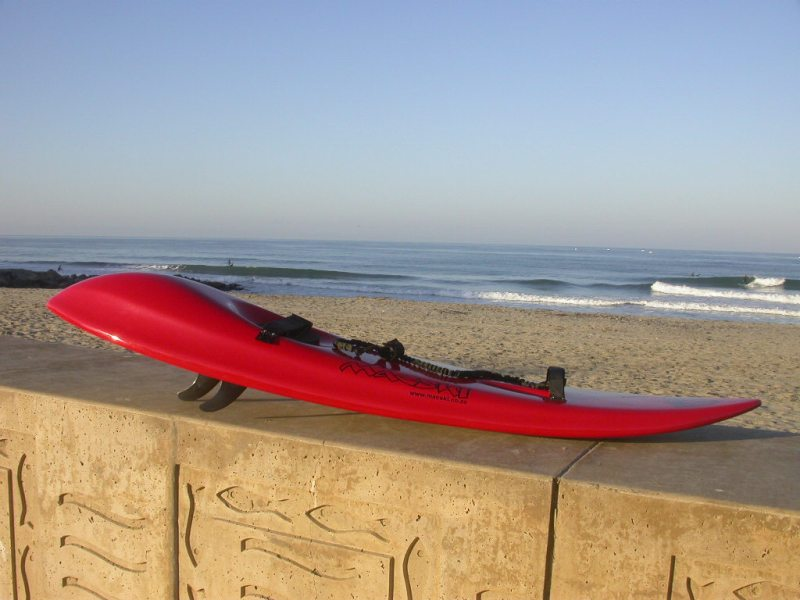
A waveski at Carlsbad, California in 2007

The Waveski, previously known as the "Paddle Ski”, is a surfboard that the rider 'sits' on top of. Waveski surfing is a dynamic sport combining paddle power with the maneuverability and performance of a surfboard. A Waveski resembles a large volume surfboard, with the addition of a hollowed out seat that has a seat belt, feet straps enable the rider to be attached to the board for weight transfer for maneuvers. A double ended paddle is used for paddle propulsion out to the waves and to catch waves, the paddle is also used to turtle /Eskimo roll/ to flip upright if the Waveski and rider is rolled over. The waveski rider or surfer uses the double-ended paddle for paddle to assist in turns. To turn, the rider uses their weight to lean on the side rail with the and paddle to pivot or propel the board up the wave. The sport is categorized under the International Canoe Federation and holds biennial World championship events.

== History ==
The history of Waveski is not as well documented as standup or bodyboarding. However, Peruvian fisherman were known to surf their wicker boats to the shore with their catch. There are also documented accounts by Captain Cook of sightings of Polynesians riding waves on dugout and outrigger canoes. By the 1970s, Australian and South African Lifeguards used two person "skis" as rescue boats at beaches. They could patrol the surf zone with these crafts and drag distressed swimmers or surfers back to shore quickly on the ski. In North America, Danny Broadhurst, a surfer from Long Island, created some early waveskis in the 1970s, although these were heavy, bulky and not particularly maneuverable. The sport experienced its major growth in the 1980s with manufacturers in South Africa, Australia and the United States. Original boards had wooden frames covered in glass fiber. Later, they were constructed with molded hollow boards, which evolved to foam injected and custom hand made boards shaped and glassed out of polystyrene foam and epoxy resins. Contemporary boards are shaped with precision CNC machines and weigh around 7 kilograms (15 lb) when completed.

== Description ==
Many of the maneuvers waveskiers have been performing since the 1980s are only now becoming mainstream moves in surfing, where they were previously derided by surfers. Maneuvers such as aerials, flip aerials, 360's and various other moves stemming from freestyle white water kayaking are all mainstream in the professional waveski surfing community. The sport is experiencing a growth in countries such as Brazil and France tying in with the river and sea kayak sports and holding joint competitions as they share a common functionality. Competitions are formatted similar to stand up surfing and are judged on the performance of the rider on the waves within a 20-minute heat.

== Equipment ==
High performance waveskis weigh 6–8 kilograms (13–18 lb) and are custom made, either via traditional foam shaping or CNC routing of an EPS foam blank that is finished in either glass, carbon, carbon kevlar or mixes of the aforementioned cloth bonded using epoxy resin. This manufacturing technique is time consuming, but makes the waveski light and strong. Waveskis are designed for surfing ocean waves and therefore design features that apply to surf boards also apply to waveskis.

The paddle is the other important component in Waveski surfing. Not only does the paddle provide the motive force to propel the waveski, it is also used in the maneuvering and control of the waveski at all times. Paddles range in length from around 1.75m (for cadets) long to nearly 2.0m long for taller waveskiers. The length of paddle chosen by the surfer is highly personal as is the degree of offset between the blades. Offset can vary from 90° to 0° and are available for left or right hand dominant waveski surfers. Choice of paddle material and construction differs from other paddle sports in that waveski surfers tend to want more buoyancy paddle blades in order to lean more on the blade during hard turns. The buoyant blade also aids stability, while paddling these narrow crafts through the waves.

== See also ==
- Kayak
- Surf Kayaking
- Surfing
