= Rees Duncan =

Australian rugby league player

Personal information
- Full name: Rees Edward Duncan
- Born: 2 November 1931; Kurri Kurri, NSW, Australia
- Died: 16 February 2024 (aged 92)

Playing information
- Position: Centre / Five-eighth
Club
Years	Team	Pld	T	G	FG	P
1954–56	Manly Warringah	54	16	9	0	66
1958	Western Suburbs	6	1	0	0	3
	Total	60	17	9	0	69
Representative
Years	Team	Pld	T	G	FG	P
1952–53	New South Wales	5	2	0	0	6
1952	Australia	2	0	0	0	0

Rees Edward Duncan (2 November 1931 – 16 February 2024) was an Australian rugby league player.

Duncan was the son of 1930s New South Wales representative forward Rees Duncan senior and grew up in Hunter Valley town of Kurri Kurri, where he began playing seniors as a teenager.

In 1952, Duncan was a surprise selection to the Australia squad for a home series against New Zealand, with his only prior representative experience being with Combined County Seconds. Used as a centre, Duncan featured in two of the three Tests matches. He played for New South Wales in 1952 and 1953.

Duncan competed with Manly Warringah from 1954 to 1956, serving as captain during his first season, then in 1957 returned to Kurri Kurri and coached them to a grand final. He joined Western Suburbs in 1958.
