= Lisa Ryan =

American author and speaker

Lisa Ryan (Lisa Gail Davenport; born c. 1960) is an American author and speaker. She has had a career as a television actress, host, reporter and producer. She assumed the title of Miss California in 1982 after Debra Maffett was crowned Miss America. Ryan then re-entered and won the Miss California title in 1985. She grew up in Visalia, California, and studied communications.

== Career ==
=== In media ===
While co-hosting the weekly television show Guidelines For Living in southern California in the late 1980s and early 1990s, Ryan studied film acting with R.J. Adams at The Actors Workshop while pursuing an acting career. She co-starred in Daughters of Privilege, an NBC "Movie of the Week", and held a feature role in Murder, She Wrote.

Ryan appeared in the daytime dramas Days of Our Lives and The Young and the Restless. Other television shows to her credit are Living the Life and Faith Café.

From 1996 to the summer of 2005, Ryan worked for The 700 Club, a daily live television broadcast where she has worked as a producer, co-host and feature reporter. As a reporter, she spoke with those who were making an impact in the Christian community whether as singers, authors, or those who had a unique or interesting event occur in their life, leading them to convert to Christianity.

In the fall of 2005, InTouch Ministries with Dr. Charles F. Stanley invited Lisa to join its daily radio and weekly television broadcasts as a co-host, which lasted until late 2006.

January 2008, Lisa and her husband, Marcus began co-hosting their own daily talk show: "Everyday with Marcus and Lisa" The original program premiered on January 28, 2008 on FamilyNet Television. “EveryDay with Marcus & Lisa” addressed the current events and family issues; interviewing authors, celebrities and recording artists. Segments would also focus on cooking, home organization, technology, financial planning, gardening, decorating, and much more. The program aired until April 24, 2009; producing 279 original shows.

In May 2009, Lisa accepted the director of Women's Ministry position at First Baptist Church of Atlanta under Dr. Charles Stanley.

=== As an author ===
Ryan wrote her first book, For Such a Time as This, Your Identity, Purpose and Passion in 2001. She followed it up with a companion study guide, which draws on the biblical example of Esther to deliver lessons on purity, modesty, beauty, destiny, courage and more. Used by teen and 20-something girls for personal devotions, group study, school curriculum and mentoring materials. Her second book, Generation Esther: Young Women Raised Up For Such a Time as This, based on the woman in the Book of Esther, continued the theme of helping girls through their struggles in life as young women growing up into adulthood. The book highlights several profiles of "modern day Esthers" including Rebecca St. James, Heather Mercer and Dayna Curry.

=== As a speaker ===
Ryan speaks at girls' and mom's conferences such as Girls of Grace, Yada Yada, Accepted Girls, BABE, high school and college chapels. Her speeches are meant to "challenge this generation of women to be counter cultural and revolutionaries in their passion and purpose for God."

Awards and achievements
Preceded by Debra Maffett	Miss California; 1982	Succeeded by Shari Moskau
Preceded by Donna Cherry	Miss California; 1985	Succeeded by Lisa Kahre
