= Santa Cruz (Torres Vedras) =

Locality in Torres Vedras, Portugal

Coordinates: 39°8′0″N 9°22′49″W

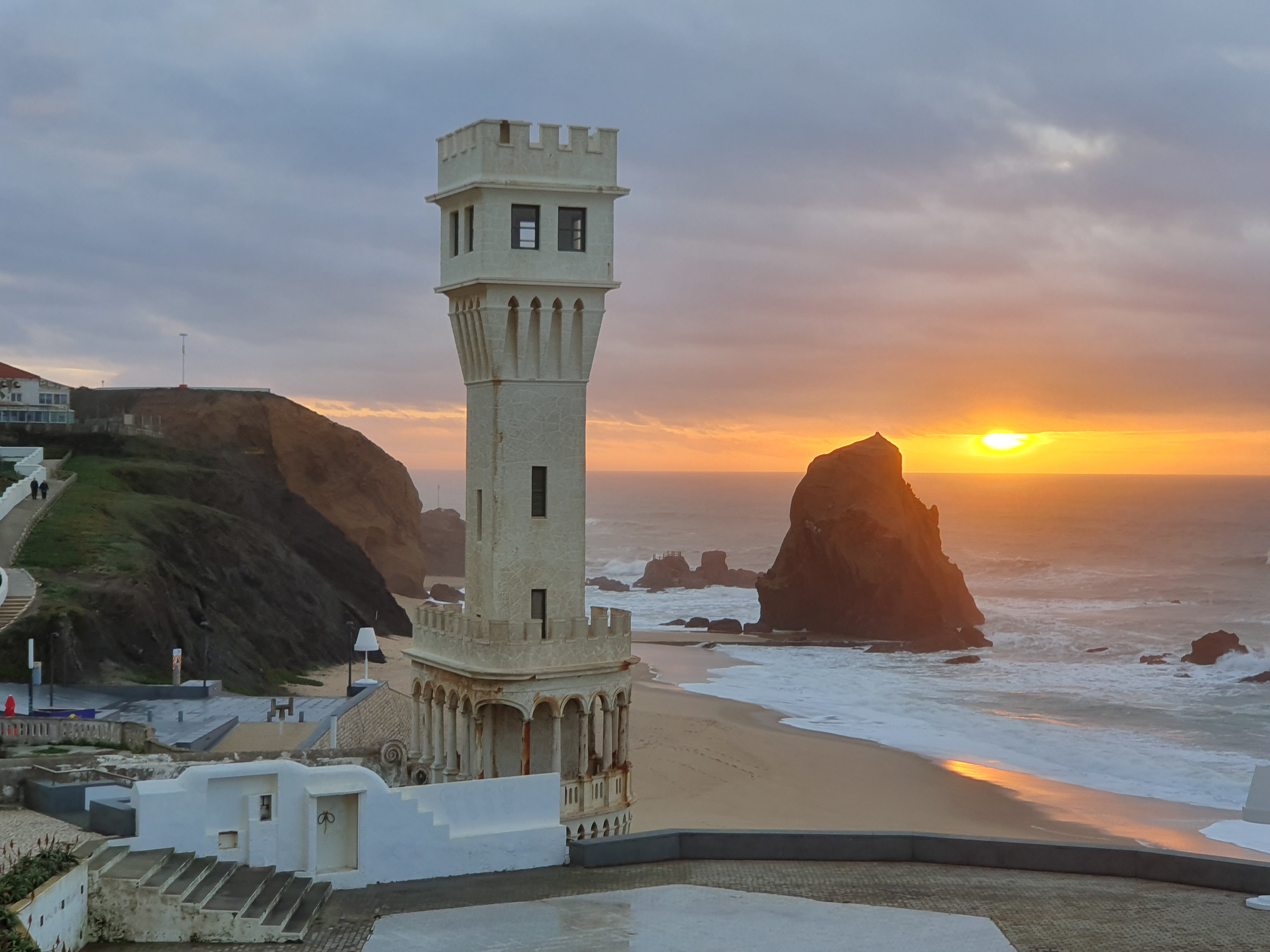
Santa Cruz beach and tower

Santa Cruz is a locality in the Silveira parish, part of the municipality of Torres Vedras, Portugal. It is mostly known for its extensive quality beaches.

The beach of Santa Cruz served as inspiration for several poets, including Antero de Quental, João de Barros and Kazuo Dan. In June 2016, an official route was inaugurated, crossing places that were once crossed by the poets. This exhibition aims to honor and immortalize the three great poets, portraying their passage and experiences through Santa Cruz.

== History ==
The Human history in Santa Cruz dates back to prehistory with its Paleolithic remains and antiquity with a Roman settlement which was slowly engulfed by the ocean. In the middle ages, like other places in the western world, the region suffered an urban, social and architectural decline, only surviving adverse conditions as a community, and later throughout the 17th century, the locality had frequent piracy attacks on the coast. With the French invasions the whole region gained more importance with the construction of the Lines of Torres Vedras that managed to stop the enemy forces.

The now known beach resort was once unknown by non-locals. In 1876, Ramalho Ortigão published "As praias de Portugal – Guia do banhista e do viajante" ("The beaches of Portugal – Bather and Traveler's Guide") where he included Santa Cruz in the "obscure beaches" chapter. It was only in the 20th century where this small community gained major attention by outsiders and has become increasingly developed since.

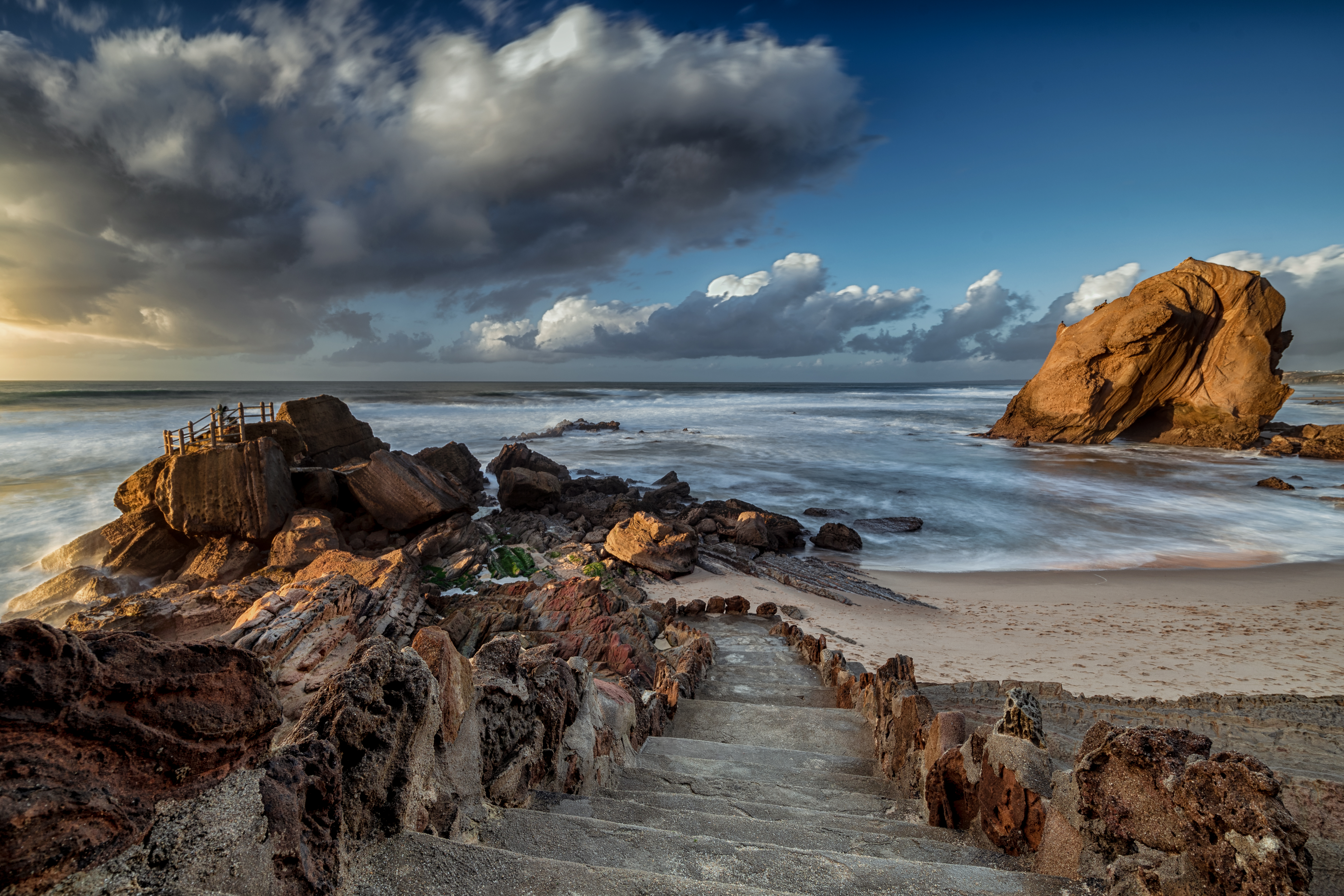
Santa Cruz beach

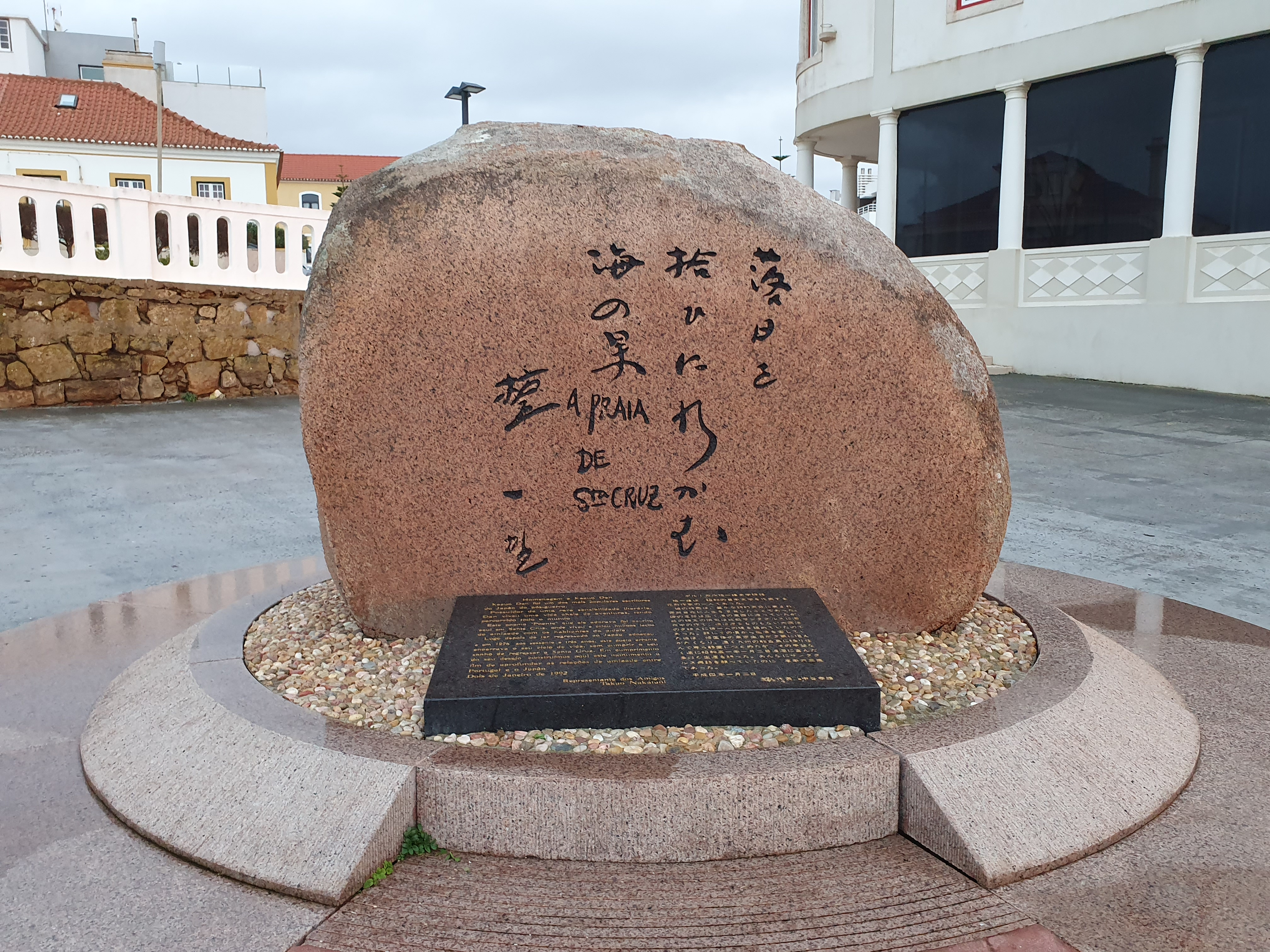
A monument to Kazuo Dan. A monument for each of the three poets can be found throughout the community

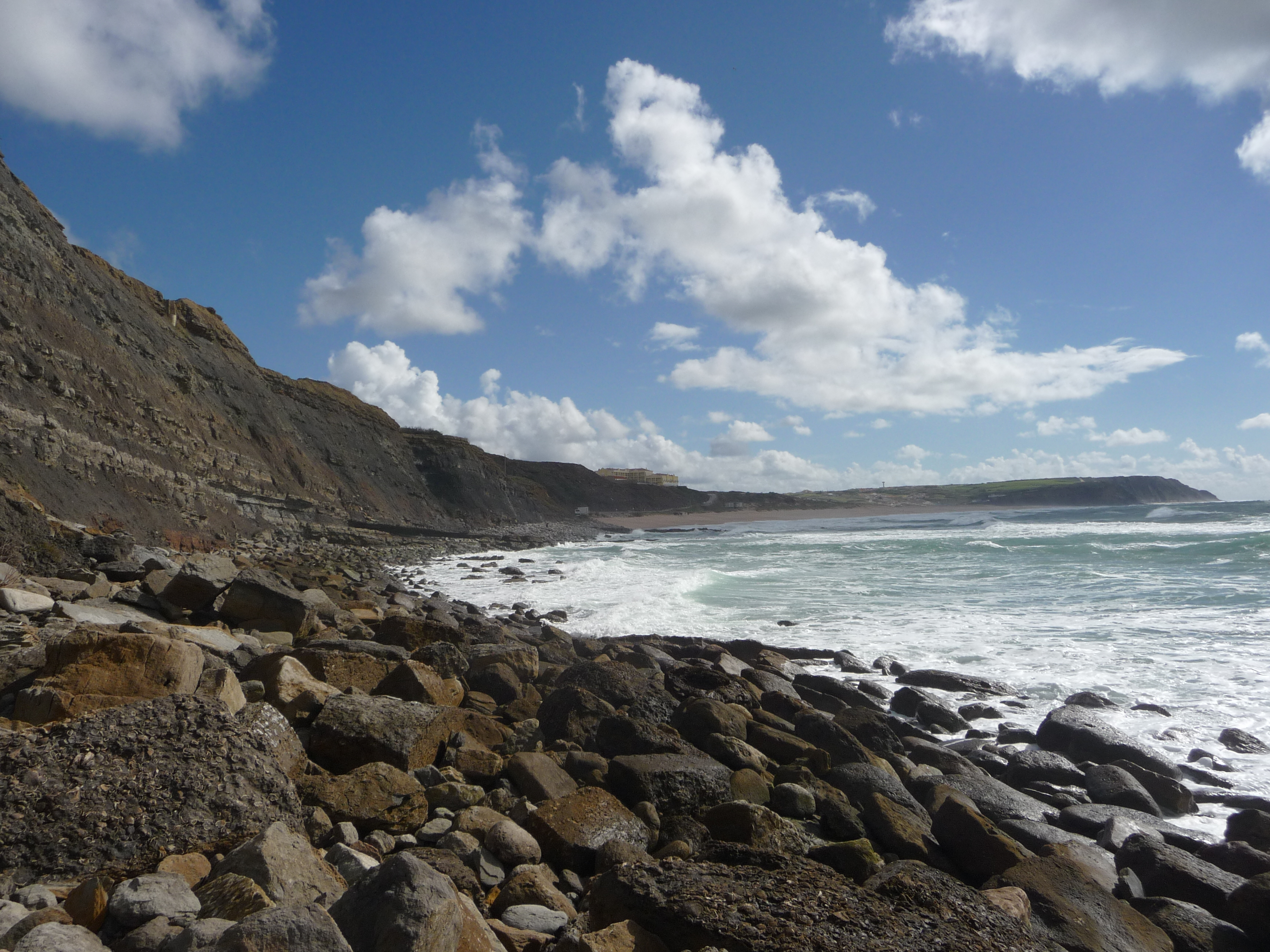

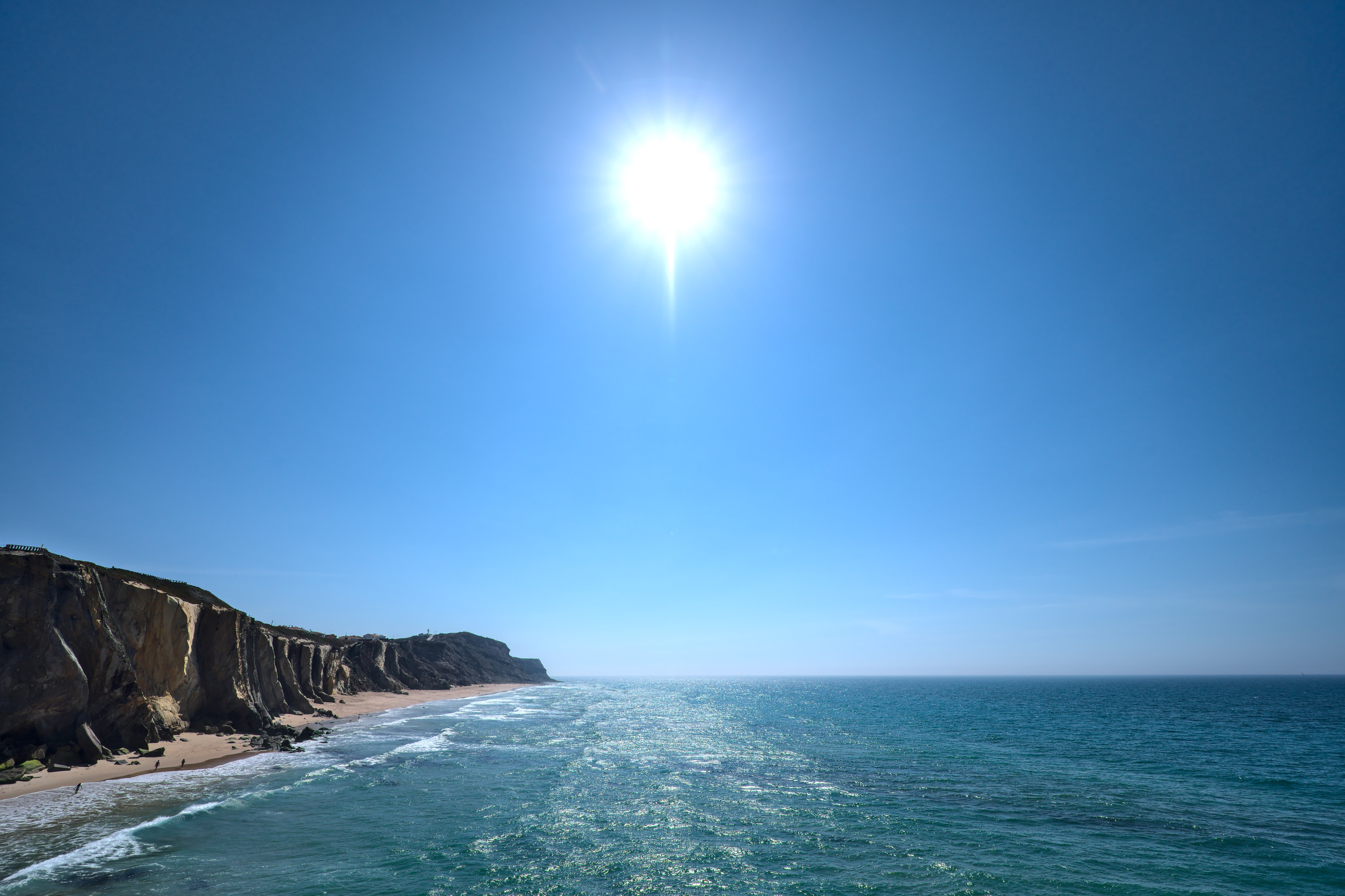

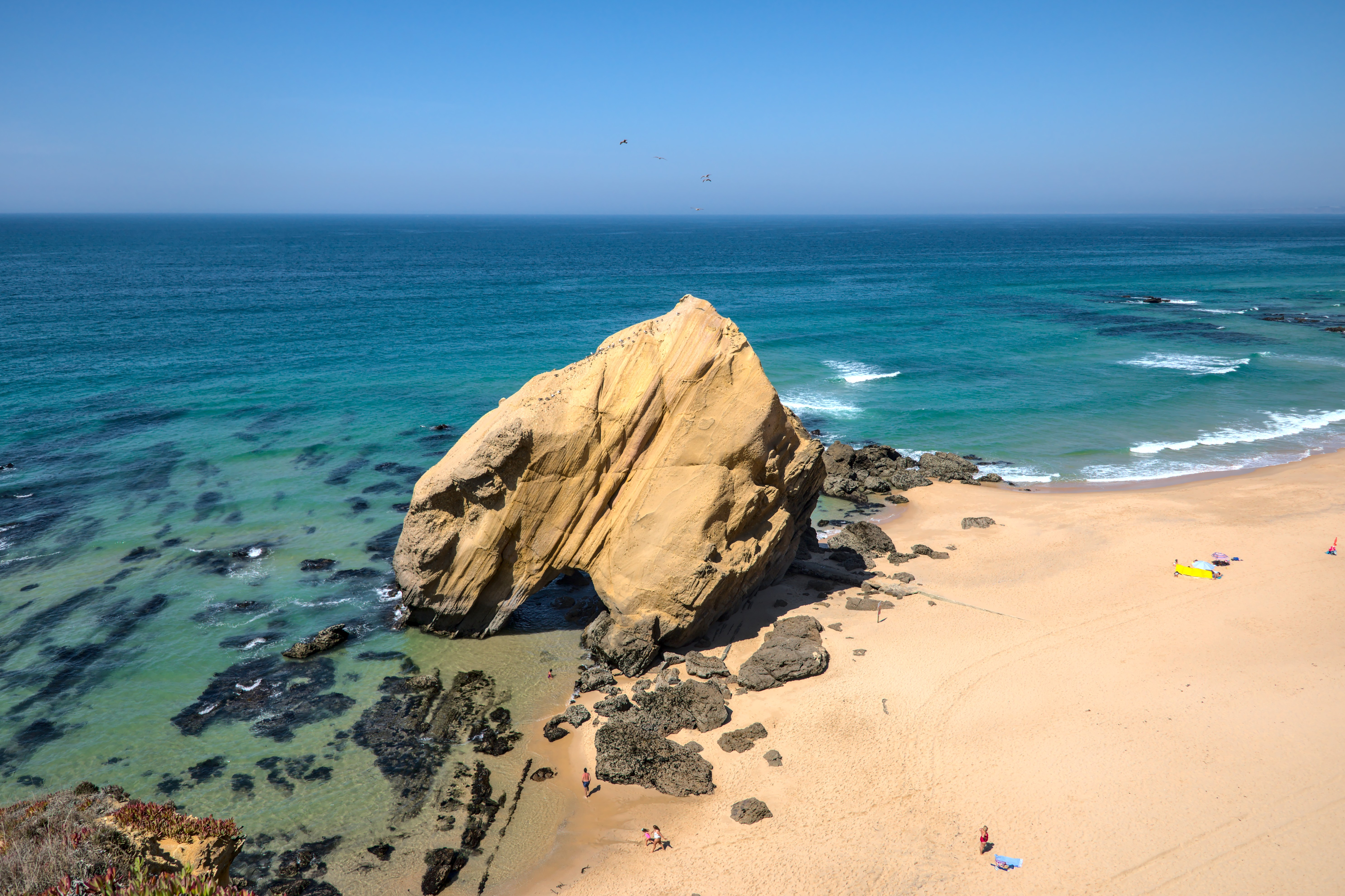

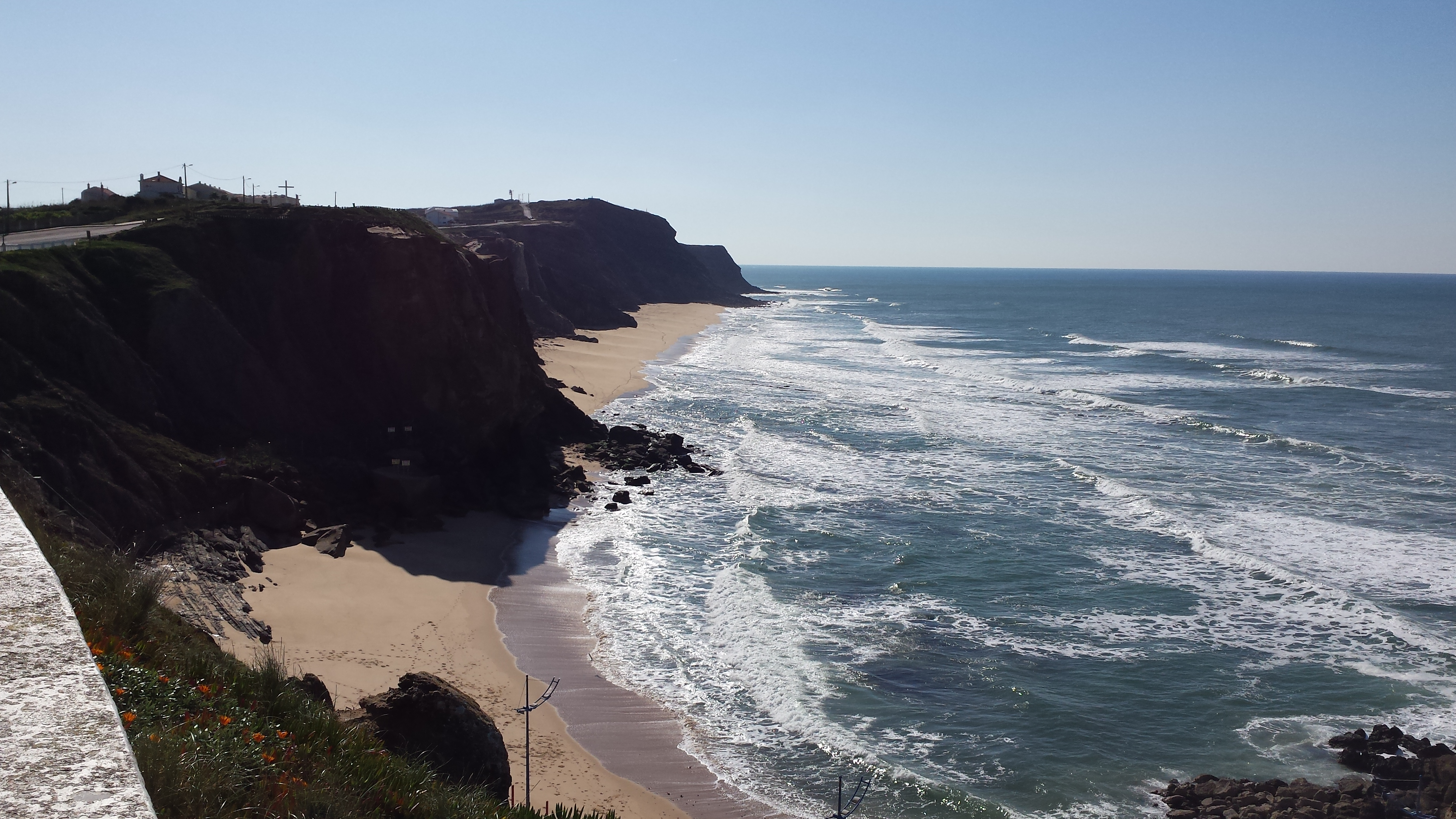
