= Shelting Bay =

Bay in the Sea of Okhotsk

Coordinates: 59°20′N 148°07′E

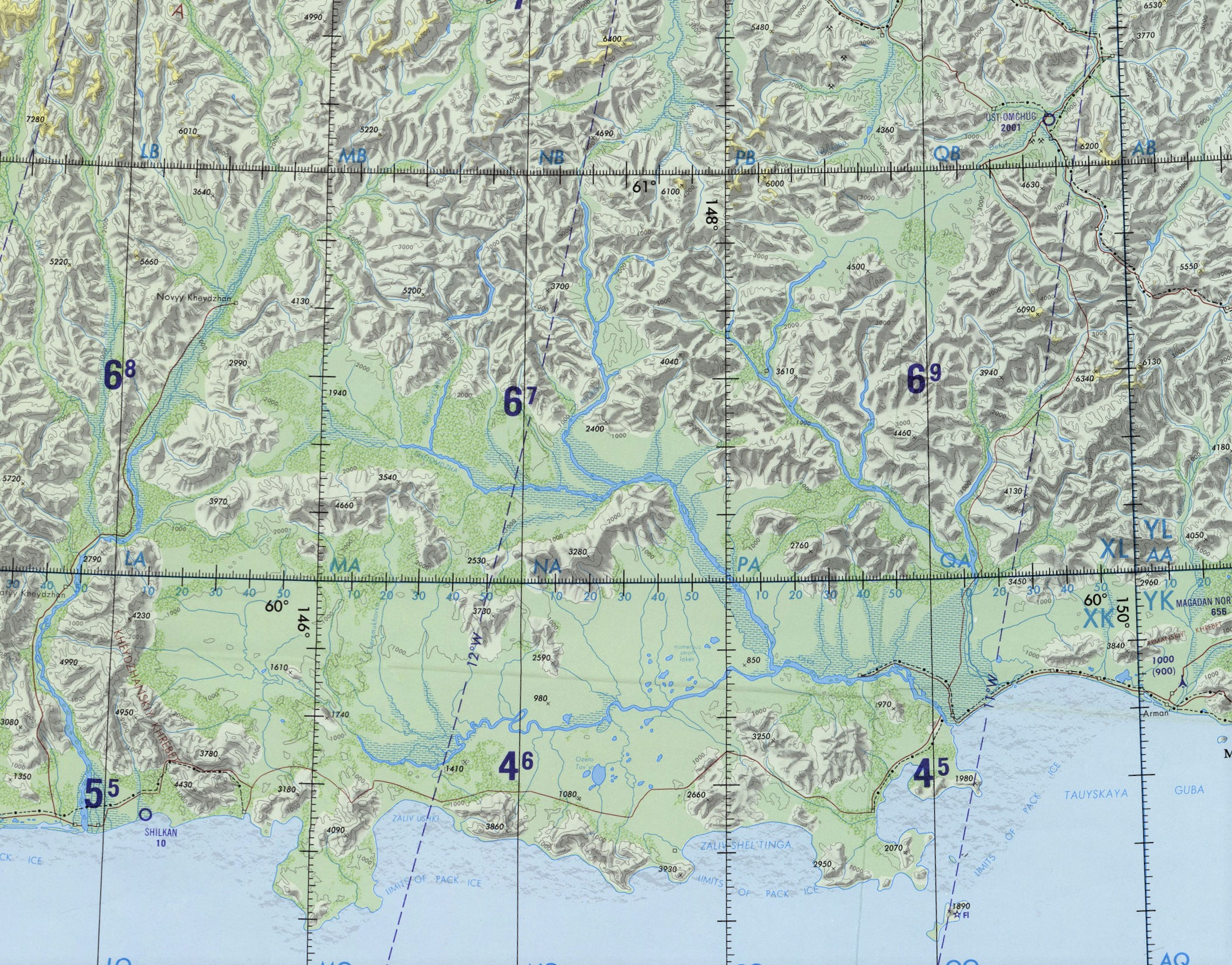
Shelting Bay is the bay to center right, just west of Taui Bay.

Shelting Bay (Russian: Zaliv Shel'tinga) is a wide bay on the northern coast of the Sea of Okhotsk. It lies just west of Taui Bay. It is entered between Capes Moskvitin and Dal'ny and is about 32 km (about 20 mi) wide. Its shores are primarily high and rocky, with the exception of a sandy beach at its northwest end. Sheltered anchorages from southerly winds may be obtained in the northwestern and eastern parts of the bay.

== History ==
American whaleships cruised for bowhead whales in the bay in the 1850s and 1860s. They called it Isaac Howland or Three Brothers Bay, the former named after a New Bedford ship and the latter after a Nantucket ship that frequented the area at the time.
