= The Amazing Race 10 =

Season of television series

- Season 10
- Region 1 DVD cover
- Presented by: Phil Keoghan
- No. of teams: 12
- Winners: Tyler Denk and James Branaman
- No. of legs: 12
- Distance traveled: 40,000 mi (64,000 km)
- No. of episodes: 13

Release
- Original network: CBS
- Original release: September 17 – December 10, 2006

Additional information
- Filming dates: May 27 – June 24, 2006

Series chronology
- ← Previous; Season 9 Next → Season 11

The Amazing Race 10 is the tenth season of the American reality competition show The Amazing Race. Hosted by Phil Keoghan, it featured twelve teams of two, each with a pre-existing relationship, competing in a race around the world. This season visited four continents and thirteen countries, traveling approximately 40,000 miles (64,000 km) over twelve legs. Filming took place from May 27 to June 24, 2006. Starting in Seattle, racers traveled through China, Mongolia, Vietnam, India, Kuwait, Mauritius, Madagascar, Finland, Ukraine, Morocco, Spain, and France, before returning to the United States and finishing in the Hudson Valley. The season premiered on CBS on September 17, 2006, and concluded on December 10, 2006.

Professional models Tyler Denk and James Branaman were the winners of this season, while dating couple Rob Diaz and Kimberly Chabolla finished in second place, and single mothers Lyn Turk and Karlyn Harris finished in third place.

== Format ==
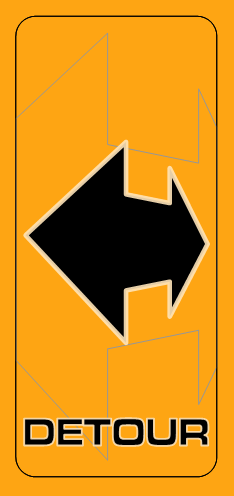
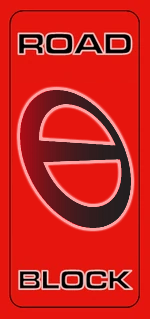
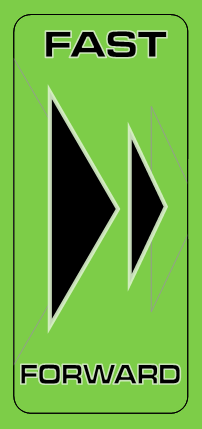
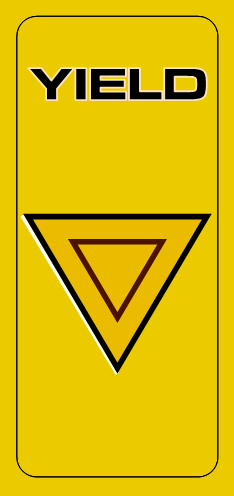
The clues which contestants receive during the course of the race generally fall into five categories: Route Info, Detour, Roadblock, Fast Forward, and Yield.

The Amazing Race is a reality television show created by Bertram van Munster and Elise Doganieri, and hosted by Phil Keoghan. The series follows teams of two competing in a race around the world. Each leg of the race requires teams to deduce clues, navigate foreign environments, interact with locals, perform physical and mental challenges, and travel on a limited budget provided by the show. At each stop during the leg, teams receive clues inside sealed envelopes, which fall into one of these categories:

- Route Info: These are simple instructions that teams must follow before they can receive their next clue.
- Detour: A Detour is a choice between two tasks. Teams may choose either task and switch tasks if they find one option too difficult. There is usually one Detour present on each leg.
- Roadblock: A Roadblock is a task that only one team member can complete. Teams must choose which member will complete the task based on a brief clue they receive before fully learning the details of the task. There is usually one Roadblock present on each leg.
- Fast Forward: A Fast Forward is a task that only one team may complete, which allows that team to skip all remaining tasks on the leg and go directly to the next Pit Stop. Teams may only claim one Fast Forward during the entire race.
- Yield: The Yield allows one team to force another team to stop racing for a predetermined amount of time before they can continue the race. Teams may use the Yield only one time during the entire race.
- Intersection: An Intersection requires two teams to work together until otherwise instructed.

Most teams who arrive last at the Pit Stop of each leg are progressively eliminated, while the first team to arrive at the finish line in the final episode wins the grand prize of US$1,000,000.

== Production ==
=== Development and filming ===
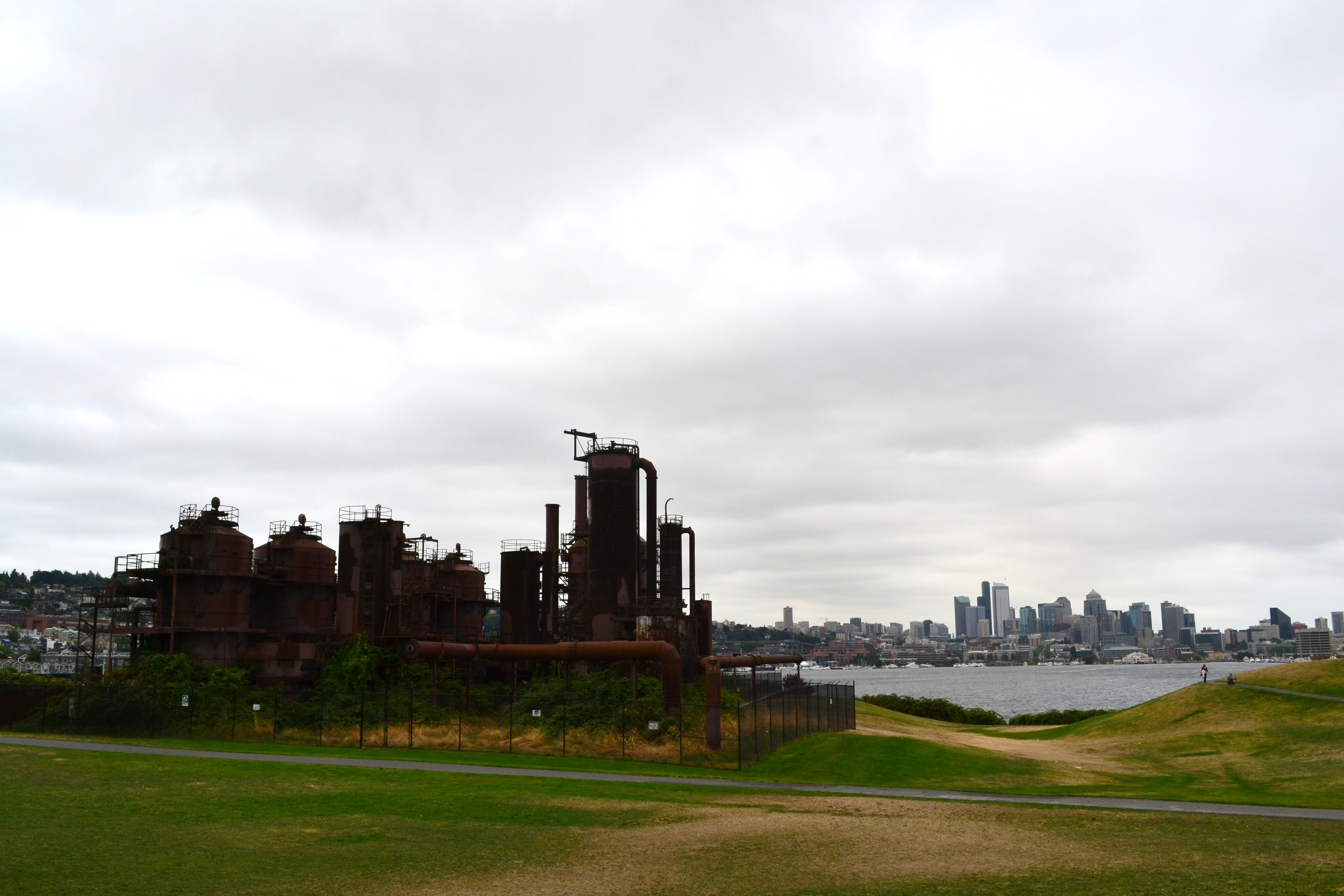
The starting line of this season was at Gas Works Park in Seattle, Washington.

Filming for this season began on May 27, 2006, at Gas Works Park in Seattle. On June 9, teams were spotted at Kuwait International Airport asking for directions to the Kuwait Towers. On June 12, production was spotted in Mauritius. On June 16, tasks were performed at Ylöjärvi and at the Helsinki Olympic Stadium. Filming concluded on June 24. The Amazing Race 10 spanned 40,000 miles (64,000 km) and covered four continents and 13 countries. Among them were six that were new to the series: Mongolia, Kuwait, Mauritius, Madagascar, Finland, and Ukraine.

This season saw the show's first double elimination in a single leg, when one team was eliminated halfway through the leg and another at the end. It also introduced a new obstacle, the Intersection, which required two teams to work together until otherwise instructed. The Intersection was also shown in conjunction with a Fast Forward, allowing both teams working together to receive the benefit of the Fast Forward. Additionally, the penalty for coming in last on a non-elimination leg was changed. Instead of being stripped of their money and possessions, the last place team was "marked for elimination", meaning the marked team would suffer a 30-minute penalty at the next Pit Stop unless they were the first to check in.

During the leg in Ukraine, host Phil Keoghan was detained at the airport for traveling to the country with a New Zealand passport and without a Ukrainian visa, which he had been informed prior to filming was not needed. He was released the next day after a worker from the American embassy processed a visa for him. After being released, Keoghan arrived at the Pit Stop 10 minutes before the lead team arrived.

== Contestants ==
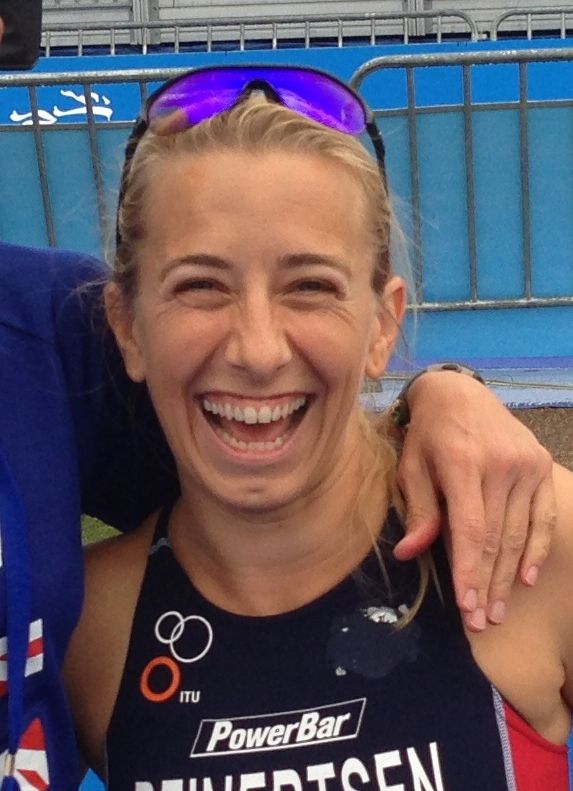
Sarah Reinertsen

The cast of The Amazing Race 10 was increased to 12 teams for the first time since season 4. While Peter Harsch and Sarah Reinertsen were portrayed as a newly dating couple, to the extent that Peter seemingly broke up with Sarah during their elimination in Kuwait, Sarah revealed that they were only friends whose "dating" was non-existent and created to give them an interesting storyline. However, she did say that her displeasure over Peter's cold and hectoring behavior on the show was genuine.

Contestants	Age	Relationship	Hometown	Status
Bilal Abdul-Mani	37	Best Friends	Cleveland, Ohio	Eliminated 1st (in Beijing, China)
Sa'eed Rudolph	39	Best Friends	Cleveland, Ohio	Eliminated 1st (in Beijing, China)
Vipul Patel	29	Married	Windermere, Florida	Eliminated 2nd (in Beijing, China)
Arti Patel	26	Married	Windermere, Florida	Eliminated 2nd (in Beijing, China)
Kellie Patterson	22	Cheerleaders	Columbia, South Carolina	Eliminated 3rd (in Ulaanbaatar, Mongolia)
Jamie Hill	22	Cheerleaders	Columbia, South Carolina	Eliminated 3rd (in Ulaanbaatar, Mongolia)
Duke Marcoccio	52	Father & Daughter	Warwick, Rhode Island	Eliminated 4th (in Phố Vác, Vietnam)
Lauren Marcoccio	26	Father & Daughter	Warwick, Rhode Island	Eliminated 4th (in Phố Vác, Vietnam)
Tom Rock	39	Boyfriends	New York City, New York	Eliminated 5th (in Hạ Long Bay, Vietnam)
Terry Cosentino	45	Boyfriends	New York City, New York	Eliminated 5th (in Hạ Long Bay, Vietnam)
Peter Harsch	35	Recently Dating	Laguna Beach, California	Eliminated 6th (in Kuwait City, Kuwait)
Sarah Reinertsen	31	Recently Dating	Trabuco Canyon, California	Eliminated 6th (in Kuwait City, Kuwait)
David Conley, Jr.	32	Coal Miner and Wife	Stone, Kentucky	Eliminated 7th (in Antananarivo, Madagascar)
Mary Conley	31	Coal Miner and Wife	Stone, Kentucky	Eliminated 7th (in Antananarivo, Madagascar)
Erwin Cho	32	Brothers	San Francisco, California	Eliminated 8th (in Kyiv, Ukraine)
Godwin Cho	29	Brothers	San Francisco, California	Eliminated 8th (in Kyiv, Ukraine)
Dustin Konzelman	24	Beauty Queens	Riverside, California	Eliminated 9th (in Barcelona, Spain)
Kandice Pelletier	24	Beauty Queens	New York City, New York	Eliminated 9th (in Barcelona, Spain)
Lyn Turk	32	Single Moms & Friends	Birmingham, Alabama	Third place
Karlyn Harris	32	Single Moms & Friends	Helena, Alabama	Third place
Rob Diaz	31	Dating	Los Angeles, California	Runners-up
Kimberly Chabolla	28	Dating	Los Angeles, California	Runners-up
Tyler Denk	29	Models	Los Angeles, California	Winners
James Branaman	27	Models	Los Angeles, California	Winners

Future appearances

Dustin Konzelman and Kandice Pelletier, and David and Mary Conley, were selected to race in The Amazing Race: All-Stars.

The Conleys also appeared on The View where they received gifts from the show, including vacations, a Ford Explorer, and a new house. In 2021, Tom Rock and Terry Cosentino competed on Ellen's Game of Games.

== Results ==
The following teams are listed with their placements in each leg. Placements are listed in finishing order.

- A red placement with a dagger (†) indicates that the team was eliminated.
- An underlined blue placement with a double-dagger (‡) indicates that the team was the last to arrive at a Pit Stop in a non-elimination leg, and was "marked for elimination" in the following leg. (Note: A team that is "marked for elimination" must check in at the Pit Stop in first place; otherwise they would receive a 30-minute penalty.)
- An italicized placement indicates a team's placement at the midpoint of a double leg.
- A green ƒ indicates that the team won the Fast Forward.
- A brown > indicates that the team used the Yield and a brown < indicates the team on the receiving end of the Yield.
- A violet + indicates that the teams encountered an Intersection.

Team placement (by leg)
Team	1	2	3	4	5	6	7	8+ (Note: This leg featured an Intersection. The teams were paired up thusly: Tyler and James and Rob and Kimberly, Lyn and Karlyn and David and Mary, and Dustin and Kandice and Erwin and Godwin.)	9a (Note: This was a double leg with two Detours and two Roadblocks shown over two episodes. The placements listed for the first half are the order of the teams' completion of the first Roadblock in Finland.)	9b	10	11	12
Tyler & James	1st	2nd	2nd	3rd	6th	6th	2nd	2ndƒ	1st	1st	1st	3rd	1st
Rob & Kimberly	5th	6th	3rd	1st	3rd	3rd	3rd	3rdƒ	4th	3rd	3rd	1st	2nd
Lyn & Karlyn	9th	9th	6th	6th	5th	4th	5th	5th	3rd	4th	2nd< (Note: Dustin and Kandice chose to Yield Lyn and Karlyn.)	2nd	3rd
Dustin & Kandice	4th	5th	4th	7th	2nd	2nd	1st	1st	2nd	2nd	4th‡>	4th†	
Erwin & Godwin	7th	8th	1st	4th	4th	5th	4th	4th	5th	5th†			
David & Mary	10th	7th	7th	5th	7th‡	1stƒ	6th‡	6th† (Note: David and Mary initially arrived 5th, but were issued a 30-minute penalty for being "marked for elimination". Lyn and Karlyn checked in during this penalty time, dropping David and Mary to last.)					
Peter & Sarah	3rd	1st	5th	2nd	1st	7th†							
Tom & Terry	8th	4th	8th (Note: Tom and Terry initially arrived 2nd, but were issued a 30-minute penalty for traveling on motorcycles, which had been explicitly prohibited. Six teams checked in during this penalty time, dropping Tom and Terry to 8th.)	8th†									
Duke & Lauren	2nd	3rd	9th†										
Kellie & Jamie	6th	10th†											
Vipul & Arti	11th†												
Bilal & Sa'eed	12th† (Note: Bilal and Sa'eed were the last team to arrive at the Meridian Gate in the Forbidden City and were eliminated in the middle of the first leg.)												

== Race summary ==
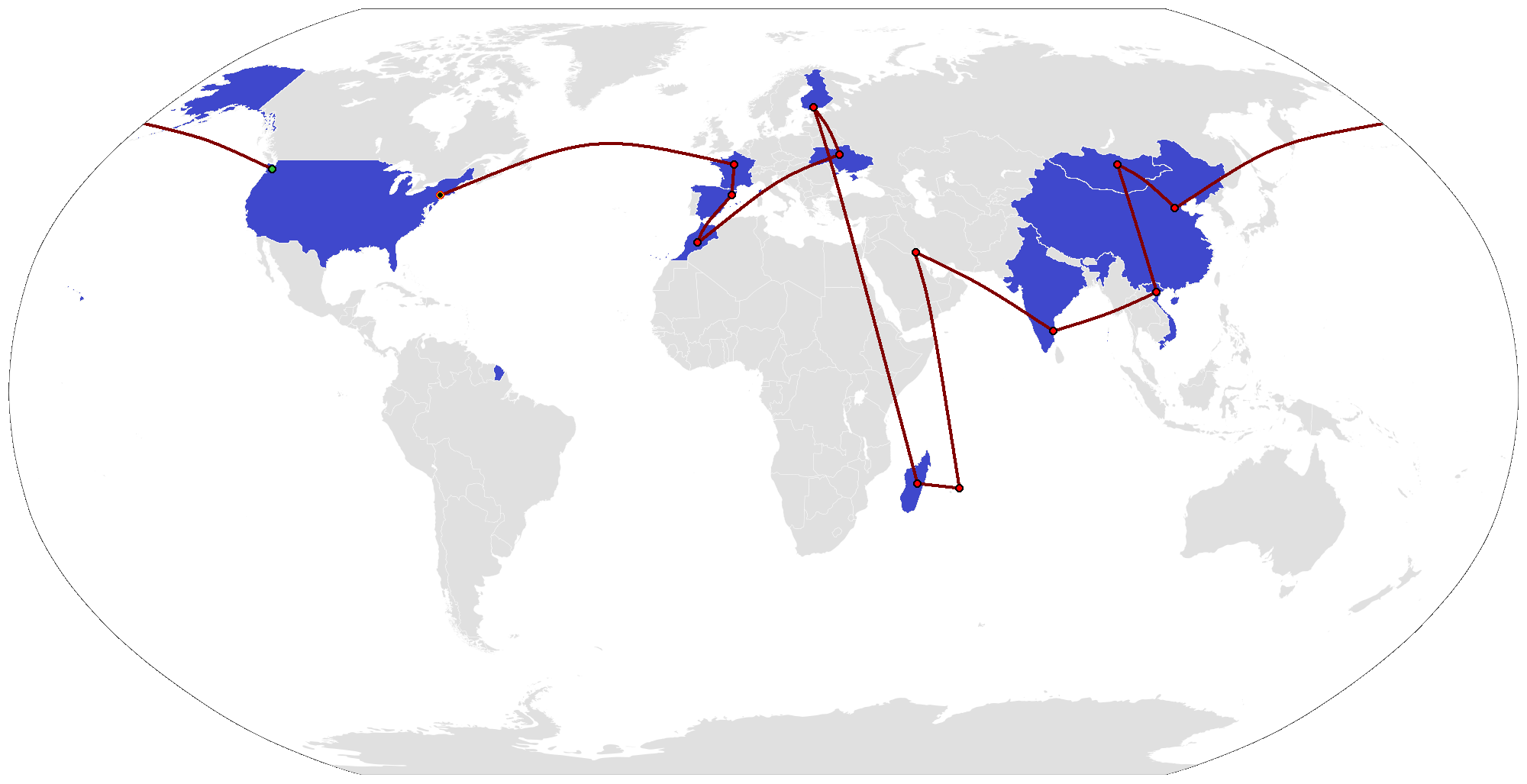
The route of The Amazing Race 10.

Destinations	Air travel Rail travel Water travel Bus travel Helicopter travel Bicycle travel Gondola travel
Route Markers	Detour Roadblock Fast Forward Yield Intersection Pit Stop

=== Leg 1 (United States → China) ===
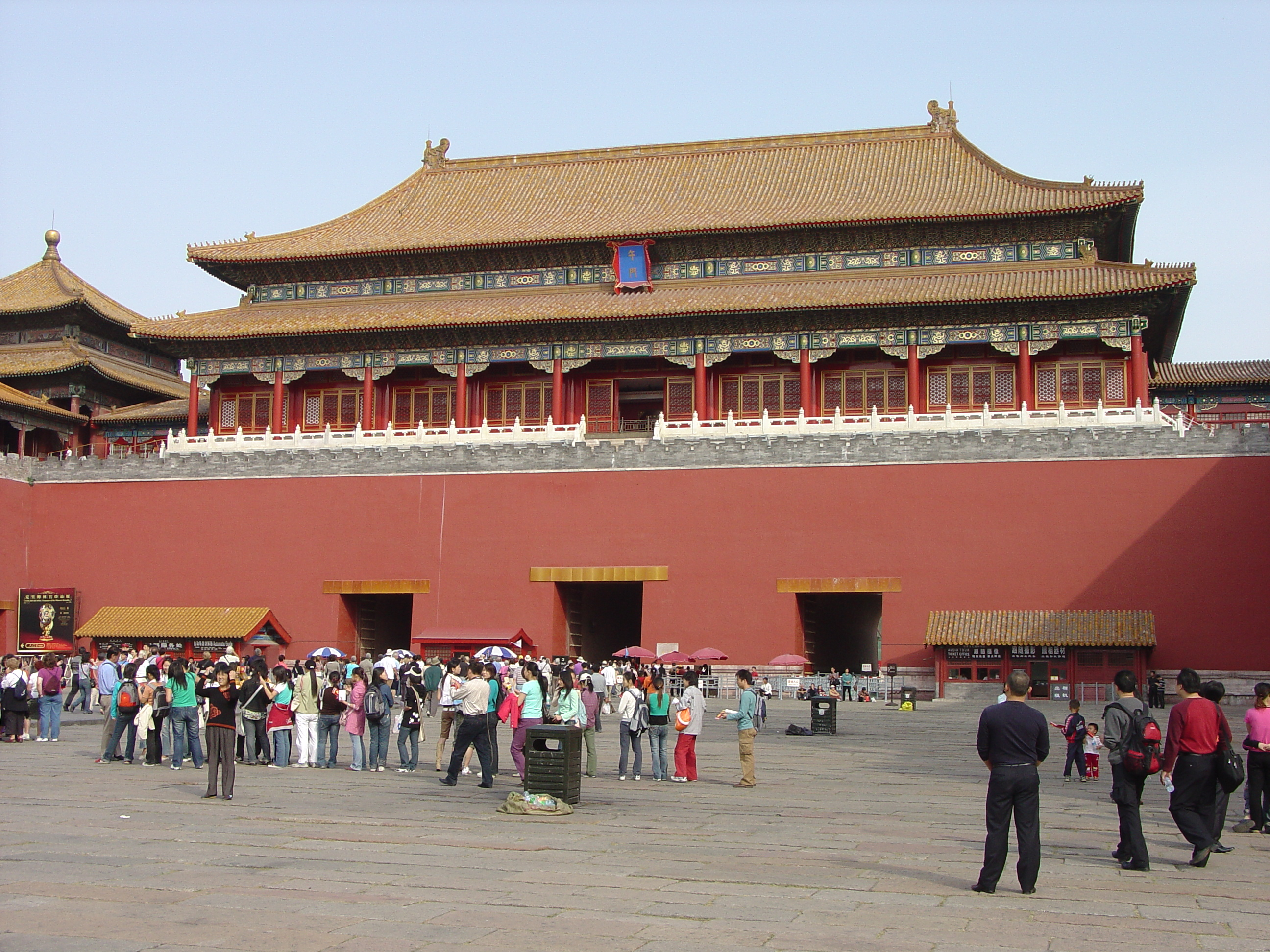
The Meridian Gate in the Forbidden City was the first leg's midpoint and where teams spent the night.

- Episode 1: "Real Fast! Quack, Quack!" (September 17, 2006)
- Prize: US$20,000 (awarded to Tyler and James)
- Eliminated: Bilal and Sa'eed and Vipul and Arti

Locations

- Seattle, Washington (Gas Works Park) (Starting Line)
- Seattle (Seattle–Tacoma International Airport) → Beijing, China
- Beijing (Gold House Restaurant)
- Beijing (Forbidden City – Meridian Gate)
- Beijing (14 Houhai North Bank Road)
- Beijing (Run De Li Market or Beihai Park)
- Beijing (Great Wall of China – Juyongguan)

Episode summary

- Teams set off from Gas Works Park and drove to Seattle–Tacoma International Airport, where they had to book one of two flights to Beijing, China. Once there, teams had to travel to the Gold House Restaurant, where they found their next clue.
- In this season's first Roadblock, one team member had to eat all of the eyeballs from a fish head soup in order to receive their next clue.
- After the Roadblock, teams had to travel to the Meridian Gate in the Forbidden City, where they had to find a kiosk and pick one of three departure times the next morning. The last team to arrive at the Meridian Gate – Bilal and Sa'eed – were eliminated. The next morning, teams had to direct the driver of a World War II-era sidecar motorbike to 14 Houhai North Bank Road and find the pedicab manager in order to receive their next clue.
- This season's first Detour was a choice between Labor or Leisure. In Labor, teams had to travel one mile (1.6 km) by pedicab to Run De Li Market, where they had to use traditional Chinese bricks to pave a 45-square-foot (4 m^{2}) section of sidewalk in a specific pattern in order to receive their next clue. In Leisure, teams had to travel two miles (3.2 km) by pedicab to Beihai Park and participate in a Chinese relaxation exercise known as Taiji Bailong, in which they had to successfully balance a ball on a paddle in order to receive their next clue.
- After the Detour, teams had to travel to the Juyongguan section of the Great Wall of China and use a rope to scale the wall in order to reach the Pit Stop.

=== Leg 2 (China → Mongolia) ===
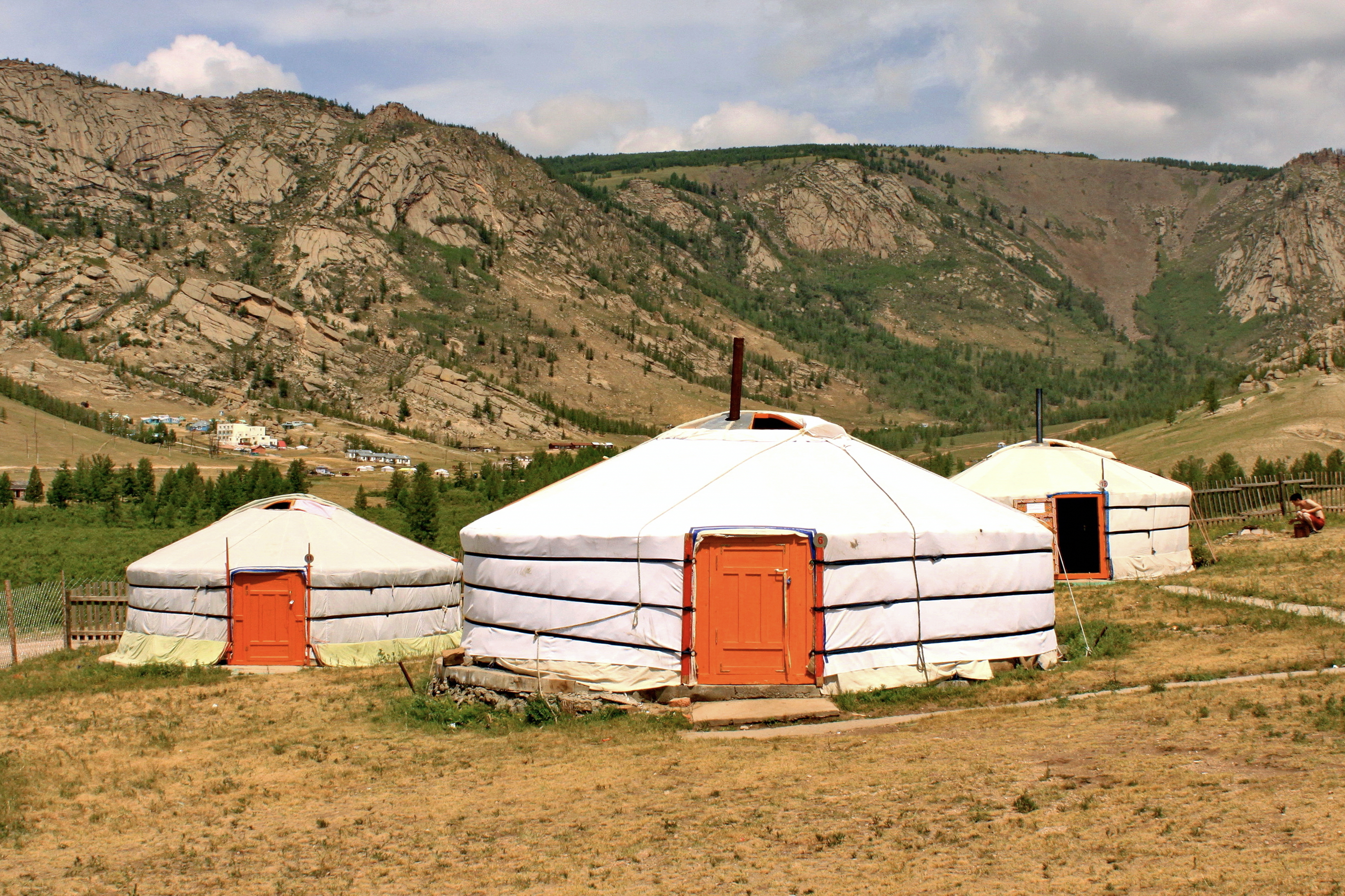
One of the Detour choices in Mongolia involved disassembling a traditional nomadic yurt.

- Episode 2: "Can Horses Smell Fear?" (September 24, 2006)
- Prize: A trip to Mexico (awarded to Peter and Sarah)
- Eliminated: Kellie and Jamie

Locations

- Beijing (Great Wall of China – Juyongguan)
- Beijing (Juyongguan Bus Stop) → Erenhot
- Erenhot → Ulaanbaatar, Mongolia
- Ulaanbaatar (Choijin Lama Temple)
- Terelj (Gorkhi-Terelj National Park)
- Ulaanbaatar (Hotel Mongolia)

Episode summary

- At the start of this leg, teams had to sign up for one of two buses departing two hours apart to Erenhot, where they then had to travel by train to Ulaanbaatar, Mongolia. Once there, teams had to go to the Choijin Lama Temple, where they had to observe a ceremony before receiving their next clue. Teams were directed to drive to Gorkhi-Terelj National Park, where they had to don traditional Mongolian army hats and ride horses 2.5 miles (4 km) until they reached a meadow with their next clue.
- This leg's Detour was a choice between Take It Down or Fill It Up. In Take It Down, teams chose a nomadic shelter called a yurt, took the canvas and roof down, packaged it for transport, and loaded it onto a camel to receive their next clue. In Fill It Up, teams had to take a cart, pulled by a hynik (an indigenous ox), 500 yards (460 m) to a river, fill four water containers, and bring them back to fill a barrel in order to receive their next clue.
- After the Detour, teams had to drive to the Hotel Mongolia in Ulaanbaatar in order to find their next clue.
- In this leg's Roadblock, one team member had to string a traditional Mongolian bow and shoot a flaming arrow at a target 160 feet (49 m) away. After hitting the target, teams could run uphill to the nearby Pit Stop.

=== Leg 3 (Mongolia → Vietnam) ===
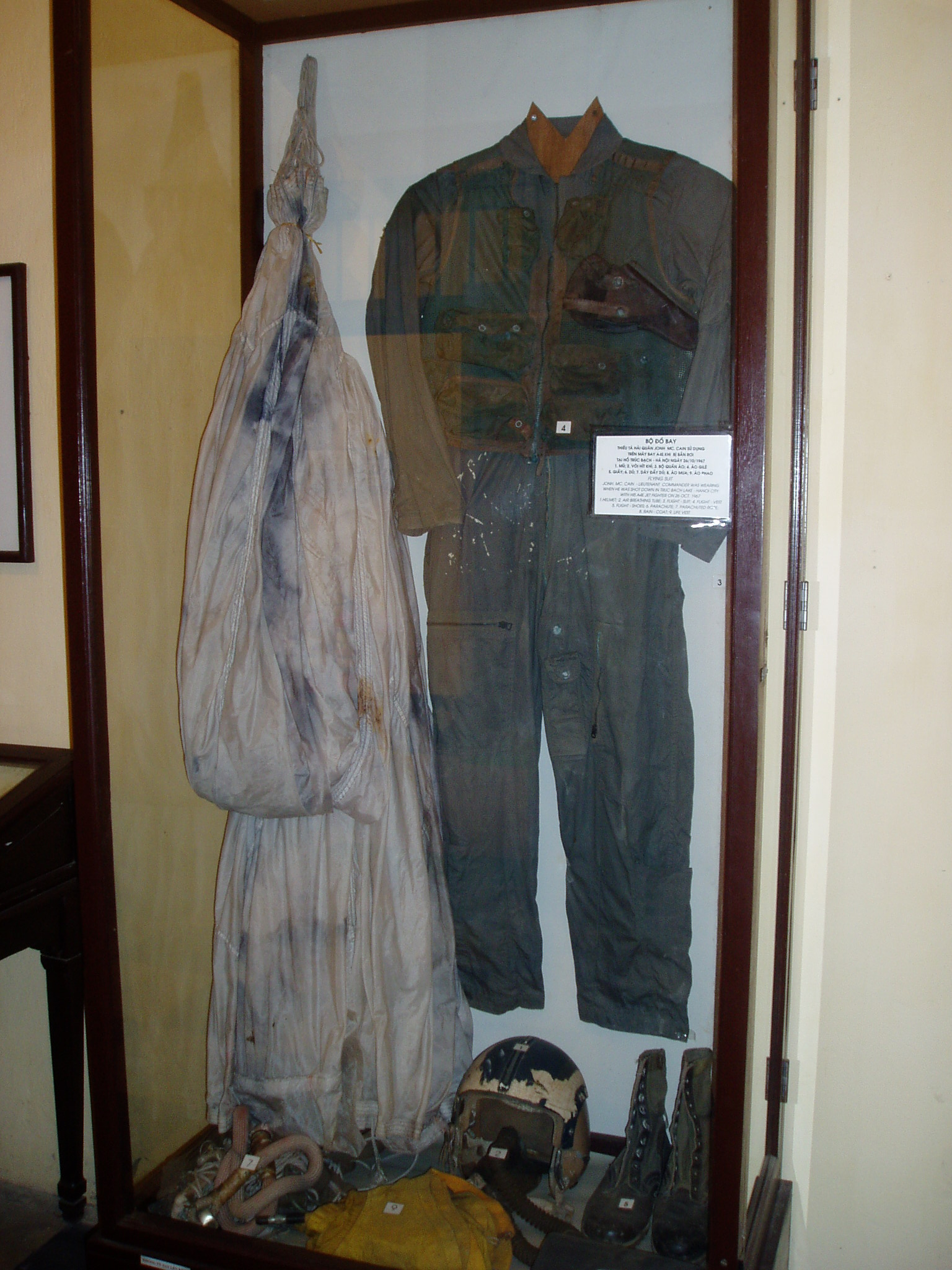
In Hanoi, teams traveled to Hỏa Lò Prison, known as the "Hanoi Hilton" during the Vietnam War, and searched for John McCain's flight suit.

- Episode 3: "Oh, Wow! It's Like One of Those Things You See on TV!" (October 1, 2006)
- Prize: A state-of-the-art home theater system (awarded to Erwin and Godwin)
- Eliminated: Duke and Lauren

Locations

- Ulaanbaatar (Hotel Mongolia)
- Ulaanbaatar (Chinggis Khaan Hotel)
- Ulaanbaatar → Hanoi, Vietnam
- Hanoi (Hỏa Lò Prison)
- Hanoi (Old Quarter – Thoa Flower Shop)
- Hanoi → Phố Vác
- Phố Vác (Dinh Vác Temple)
- Phố Vác (Home of Nguyĕn Văn Thuý or Nhà Thò)
- Phố Vác (Canh Dong Dia)

Episode summary

- At the start of this leg, teams had to drive to the Chinggis Khaan Hotel, where they booked a flight to Hanoi, Vietnam. Once there, teams had to travel to Hỏa Lò Prison and search the grounds for the room displaying John McCain's flight suit in order to receive their next clue, which directed them to the Thoa Flower Shop in Hanoi's Old Quarter.
- In this leg's Roadblock, one team member had to choose a bicycle with a basket of flowers and sell enough to make at least 80,000₫ (roughly $5) in order to receive their next clue.
- After the Roadblock, teams were instructed to travel by bus to Phố Vác and then travel to Dinh Vác Temple in order to find their next clue.
- This leg's Detour was a choice between Fuel or Fowl. In Fuel, teams had to travel to the home of Nguyĕn Văn Thuý and make 30 acceptable round coal bricks by putting wet coal into a traditional press in order to receive their next clue. In Fowl, teams had to travel to Nhà Thò, where they had to use traditional local materials to properly build an intricate Vietnamese birdcage in order to receive their next clue.
- After the Detour, teams had to check in at the Pit Stop: Canh Dong Dia.

Additional notes

- Teams were given no money at the start of this leg and were instructed that they could not beg or sell anything during the leg to earn money. Teams could only keep the money that they earned during the Roadblock.
- All route markers in Vietnam were colored yellow and white rather than red and yellow, so as to avoid confusion with the flag of the former independent state of South Vietnam.

=== Leg 4 (Vietnam) ===
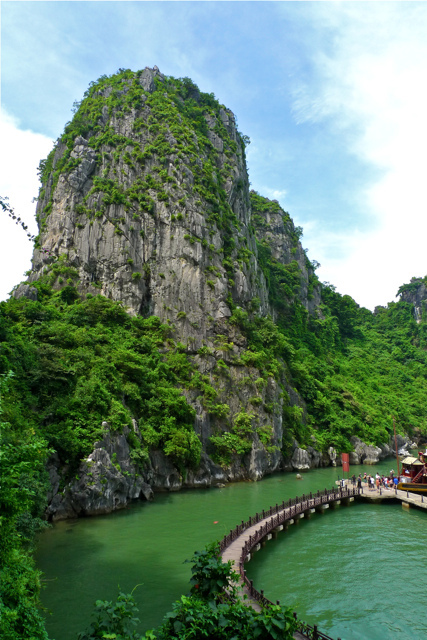
This leg in Vietnam focused on Hạ Long Bay.

- Episode 4: "I Know Phil, Little Ol' Gorgeous Thing" (October 8, 2006)
- Prize: A jet-ski for each team member (awarded to Rob and Kimberly)
- Eliminated: Tom and Terry

Locations

- Phố Vác (Canh Dong Dia)
- Hanoi (Lý Thái Tổ Garden)
- Hanoi → Hạ Long
- Hạ Long (Hydrofoil Harbor)
- Hạ Long Bay (Hòn Yên Ngựa)
- Hạ Long Bay (Sửng Sốt Cave)
- Hạ Long Bay (Soi Sim Island)

Episode summary

- At the start of this leg, teams had to pick up 588,000₫ (roughly $37) from a nearby table. They then traveled to Lý Thái Tổ Garden in Hanoi, where they had to listen to their next clue recited over a loudspeaker: "Attention racers! Here is your clue! Taxi across the Red River to Bến Xe Gia Lâm. Then take a bus to Bến Xe Bãi Cháy. Then find the Hydrofoil Harbor."
- In this leg's Roadblock, one team member had to use a mechanical ascender to climb 90 feet (27 m) up the sheer face of the cliff at Hòn Yên Ngựa, retrieve their clue, and then rappel back down.
- After the Roadblock, teams were instructed to travel by motorboat to Sửng Sốt Cave and search the caves for their next clue.
- This leg's Detour was a choice between Over or Under. For both Detour options, teams were taken to the water by a junk and then given a sampan to row to their task. In Over, teams had to row to a provisions ship, load supplies onto the sampan, and then row to a floating village and deliver goods to the specific addresses on their invoice. When finished, teams rowed back to present the completed invoice to the captain, who gave them their next clue. In Under, teams had to take a marked buoy and row the sampan to a pearl farm, where they chose a line of buoys and hauled 30 baskets out of the sea and onto their boats. They had to deliver the baskets to a pearl farmer in order to receive their next clue.
- After the Detour, teams had to take a junk to the Pit Stop: Soi Sim Island in Hạ Long Bay.

=== Leg 5 (Vietnam → India) ===
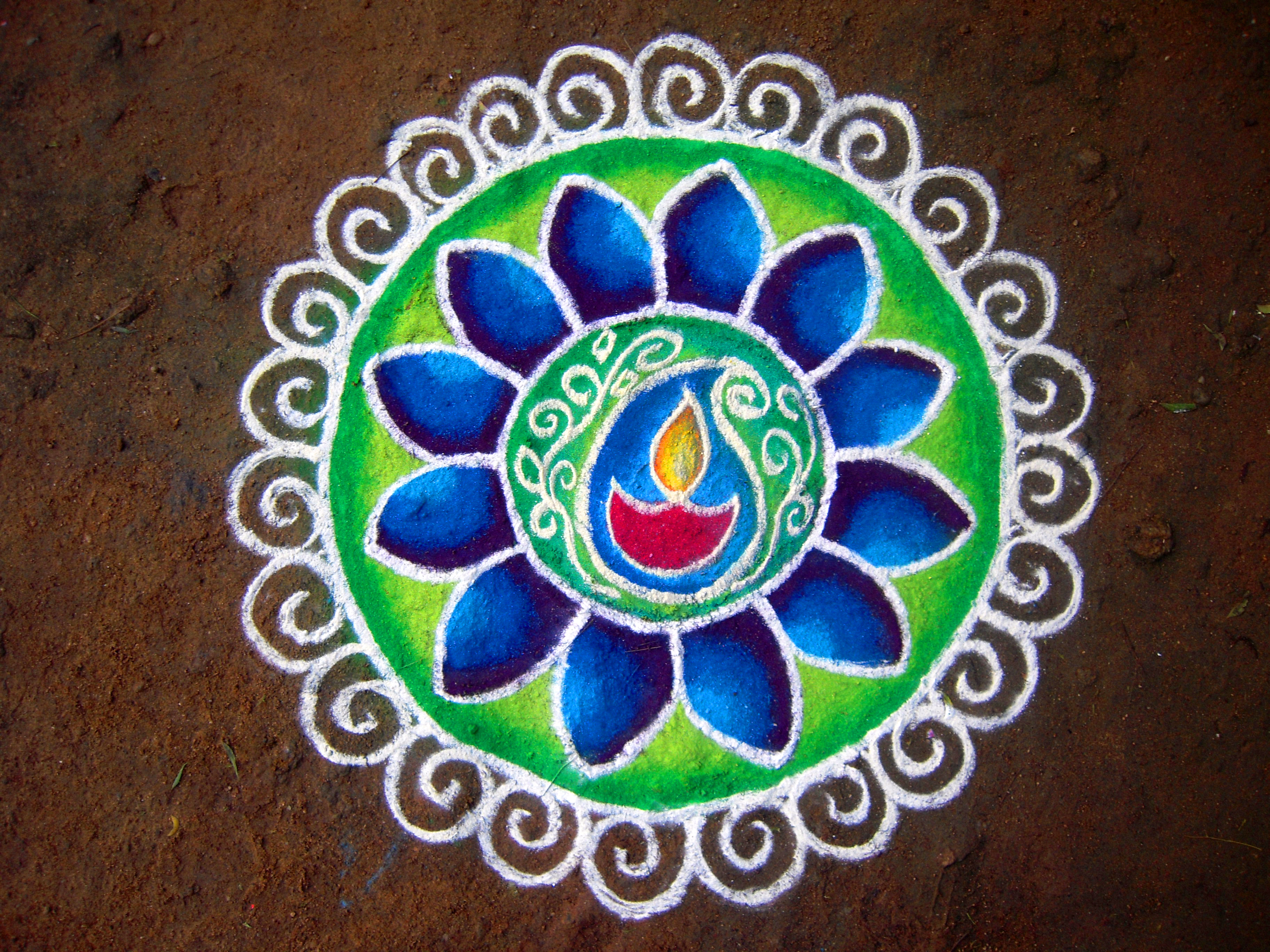
A Detour choice in Chennai involved forming a traditional floral image using colored powder.

- Episode 5: "I Covered His Mouth, Oh My Gosh!" (October 15, 2006)
- Prize: A home gym center for each team member (awarded to Peter and Sarah)

Locations

- Hạ Long (Bến Xe Bãi Cháy)
- Haiphong → Hanoi
- Hanoi → Chennai, India
- Chennai → Mamallapuram
- Mamallapuram (Vallavar Arts & Crafts)
- Vadanemmeli (Madras Crocodile Bank) or Mamallapuram (Sri Sthala Sayana Perumal Temple)
- Vadanemmeli or Mamallapuram → Chennai
- Chennai (Karthik Driving School)
- Chennai (Chettinad House)

Episode summary

- At the start of this leg, teams were instructed to travel by train back to Hanoi, and then fly to Chennai, India. Once there, teams had to travel by bus to Mamallapuram and then find their next clue at Vallavar Arts & Crafts.
- This leg's Detour was a choice between Wild Things or Wild Rice. In Wild Things, teams had to travel nine miles (14 km) to the Madras Crocodile Bank and help the workers wrangle and transport a marsh crocodile to a new pit in order to receive the next clue. In Wild Rice, teams had to travel 200 yards (180 m) to the Sri Sthala Sayana Perumal Temple and choose an outline of a traditional floral design shown on the temple floor. Using a picture for reference, they had to use colored powder made from rice to color in the outline so that it matched the picture in order to receive their next clue.
- After the Detour, teams had to travel by bus back to Chennai and then travel to the Karthik Driving School.
- In this leg's Roadblock, one team member had to attend a driver's education class and then pass a driving test while driving on the left-hand side of the congested streets in order to receive their next clue and an Indian driver's license.
- After the Roadblock, the team member who completed it had to drive their partner in their instructor's car to the Pit Stop at the Chettinad House.

Additional notes

- Due to Vietnamese regulations, teams couldn't purchase tickets at an airline counter, so they had to book their flight at a travel agency beforehand.
- This was a non-elimination leg.

=== Leg 6 (India → Kuwait) ===
After arriving in Kuwait, one team member had to climb a ladder on the outside of Kuwait Towers.

- Episode 6: "Maybe Steven Seagal Will See Me And Want Me to Be in One of His Movies" (October 22, 2006)
- Prize: A trip to Jamaica (awarded to David and Mary)
- Eliminated: Peter and Sarah

Locations

- Chennai (Chettinad House)
- Chennai → Kuwait City, Kuwait
- Kuwait City (Kuwait Towers)
- Kuwait City (6th Ring Road)
- Kuwait City (Souk Al-Gharabally)
- Sulaibiya (Souk Sulaibiya) or Kabed (Kuwait Camel Racing Club)
- Kuwait City (Al-Sadiq Water Towers)

Episode summary

- At the start of this leg, teams received a mobile phone with a video message depicting a landmark, which they had to determine was the Kuwait Towers. After flying to Kuwait City, they had to drive to the towers in order to find their next clue.
- In this leg's Roadblock, one team member had to climb a ladder to the top of one of the towers 610 feet (190 m) above the ground in order to retrieve a satchel filled with puzzle pieces. They then had to return to the ground and assemble the puzzle that, when completed, identified their next destination, Al-Gharabally Street, in Arabic (الغربللي سوق شارع).
- This season's first Fast Forward required one team to wear protective gear and use a flame retardant shield to approach a simulated oil fire with temperatures over 1,000 °F (538 °C) and retrieve the Fast Forward award from a clue box. David and Mary won the Fast Forward.
- After the Roadblock, teams had to drive to the Souk Al-Gharabally, where they had to find a marked stall in the marketplace in order to receive their next clue.
- This leg's Detour was a choice between Manual or Automatic. In Manual, teams drove to Souk Sulaibiya and had to fill ten 110-pound (50 kg) bags of camel feed, transport them 100 yards (91 m) to a pallet, and properly stack them in order to receive their next clue. In Automatic, teams had to drive to the Kuwait Camel Racing Club, where they used a walkie-talkie to operate a voice activated robotic jockey attached to a camel. When the camel ran a 140-yard (130 m) course, they could receive their next clue.
- After the Detour, teams had to check in at the Pit Stop: the Al-Sadiq Water Towers.

Additional note

- Peter and Sarah fell so far behind that all of the other teams had already checked in at the Pit Stop before they arrived at the Detour. Peter and Sarah were instructed to go directly to the Pit Stop for elimination.

=== Leg 7 (Kuwait → Mauritius) ===
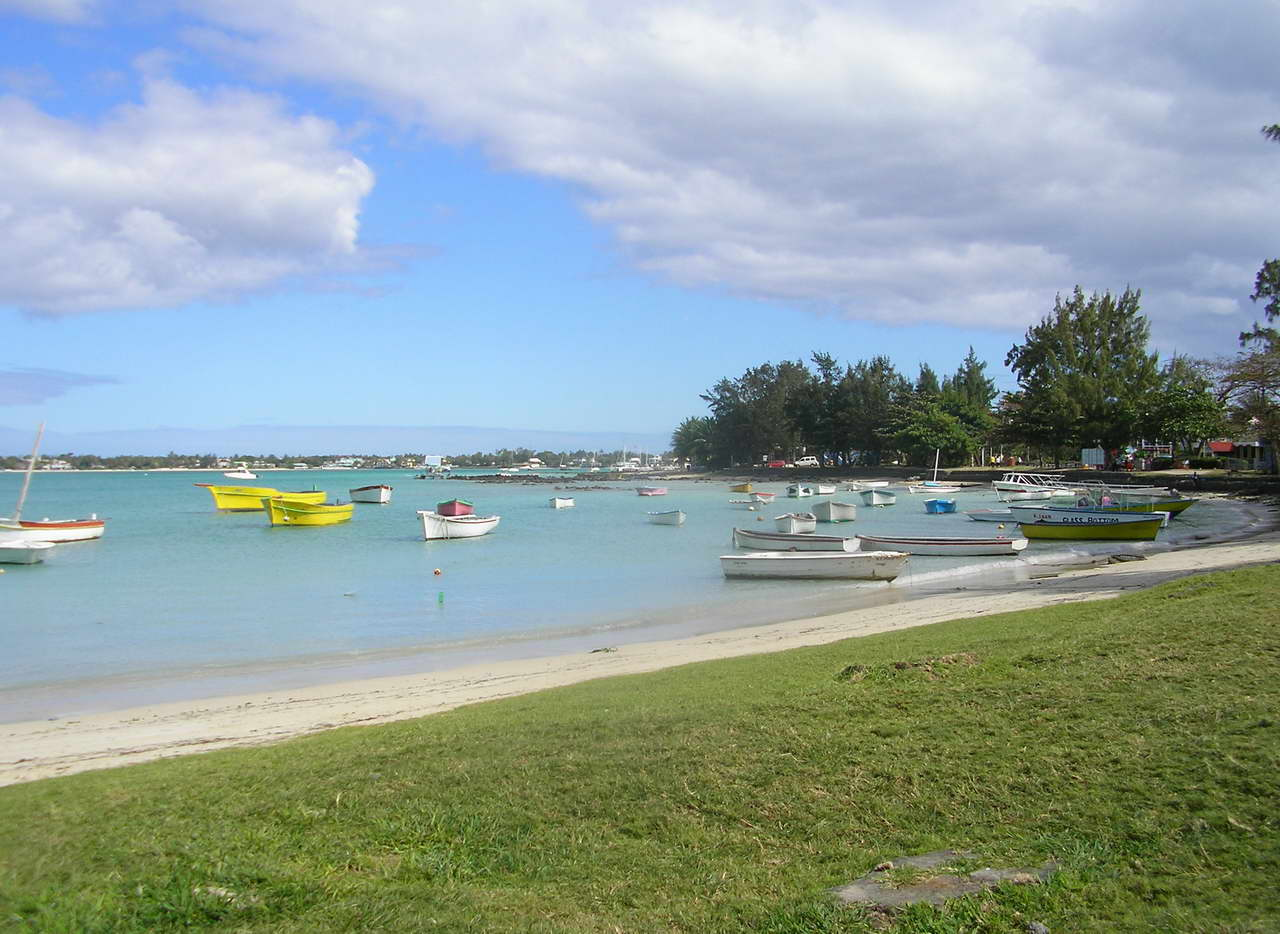
While in Mauritius, teams visited the shores of Grand Baie.

- Episode 7: "I Wonder If This Is Going to Make My Fingers Pickle" (October 29, 2006)
- Prize: A motor scooter for each team member (awarded to Dustin and Kandice)

Locations

- Kuwait City (Al-Sadiq Water Towers)
- Kuwait City → Plaine Magnien, Mauritius (Sir Seewoosagur Ramgoolam International Airport)
- Grand Baie (Isla Mauritia)
- Case Noyale (Post Office)
- Rivière Noire District (Les Salines de Petite Rivière Noire or Île aux Benitiers)
- Bel Ombre (Château Bel Ombre)

Episode summary

- At the start of this leg, teams were instructed to fly to Mauritius. Once there, teams had to search the airport parking lot for a marked vehicle with their next clue, a model boat of Isla Mauritia that said "Swim to Me". Teams had to figure out that their next location was Grand Baie, where they had to swim out to the ship in order to receive their next clue, and then swim back to shore. Teams then had to find their next clue at the post office in Case Noyale.
- This leg's Detour was a choice between Salt or Sea. In Salt, teams had to search through three piles of salt for a salt shaker containing their next clue. In Sea, teams had to choose a boat pilot and then travel 2.5 miles (4 km) by motorboat to Île aux Benitiers. There, they had to search the island using a treasure map in order to find the boat's sail that they had to carry back to the boat and attach before sailing back to the starting point, where they received their next clue.
- After the Detour, teams had to check in at the Pit Stop: the Château Bel Ombre in Bel Ombre.

Additional note

- This was a non-elimination leg.

=== Leg 8 (Mauritius → Madagascar) ===
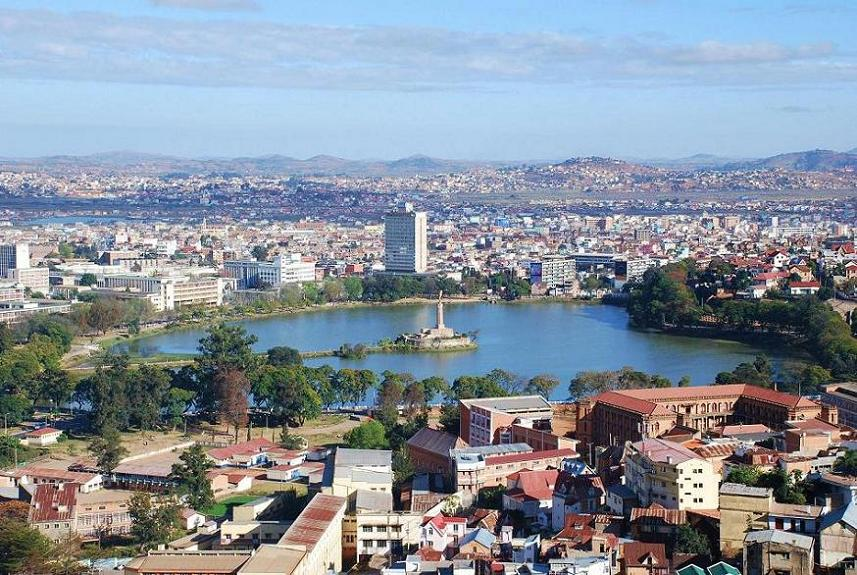
In Antananarivo, teams encountered the first ever Intersection beneath the Black Angel Statue on Lake Anosy.

- Episode 8: "He Can't Swim But He Can Eat Cow Lips!" (November 5, 2006)
- Prize: A trip to the Kona coast of Hawaii (awarded to Dustin and Kandice)
- Eliminated: David and Mary

Locations

- Bel Ombre (Château Bel Ombre)
- Plaine Magnien → Antananarivo, Madagascar
- Antananarivo (Lac Anosy – Black Angel Statue)
- Antananarivo (Analakely Market)
- Antananarivo (Tohotohobato Ambondrona Analakely)
- Antananarivo (Cathedral Andohalo)

Episode summary

- At the start of this leg, teams were instructed to fly to Antananarivo, Madagascar. Once there, teams had to travel to the Black Angel Statue at Lac Anosy in order to find their next clue.
- At the Black Angel statue, teams encountered an Intersection, where teams were required to work together in pairs to complete tasks until further notice. The teams were paired up thusly: Tyler and James and Rob and Kimberly, Lyn and Karlyn and David and Mary, and Dustin and Kandice and Erwin and Godwin.
- This season's second Fast Forward required one pair of newly-joined teams to go to the Analakely Market, where each team member had to eat one full serving of cow lips. Tyler and James and Rob and Kimberly won the Fast Forward.
- This leg's Detour was a choice between Long Sleep or Short Letter. In Long Sleep, the newly-joined teams had to travel 2.2 miles (3.5 km) to an open market, where they had to wrap eight mattresses with a cover and deliver them on foot approximately one mile (1.6 km) through the streets of Antananarivo to a specific address in order to receive their next clue. In Short Letter, the newly-joined teams would have had to travel 3.5 miles (5.6 km) to a paper-working station where they had to work together to successfully make 28 pieces of handcrafted paper in order to receive their next clue. All teams chose Long Sleep.
- After the Detour, the Intersection ended. Teams had to travel to Tohotohobato Ambondrona Analakely in order to find their next clue.
- In this leg's Roadblock, one team member had to go up a steep staircase and find four different rubber stamp vendors with stamps matching those on their clue. Once they collected all four stamps, they could then proceed to the Pit Stop at the Cathedral Andohalo, where their teammate was waiting.

=== Leg 9 (Madagascar → Finland → Ukraine) ===
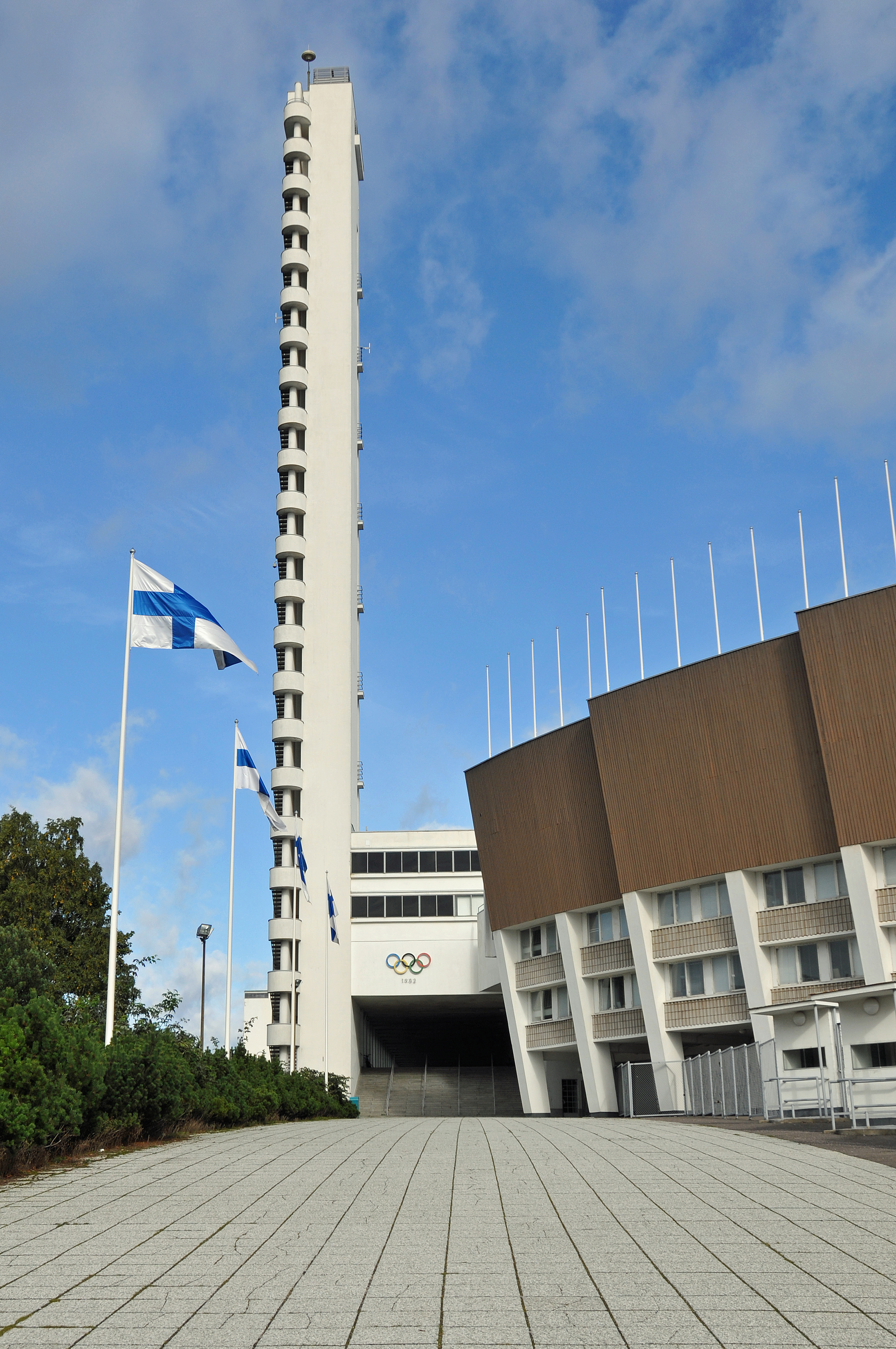
In this double-length leg, teams had to rappel down the tower of the Helsinki Olympic Stadium in Finland...

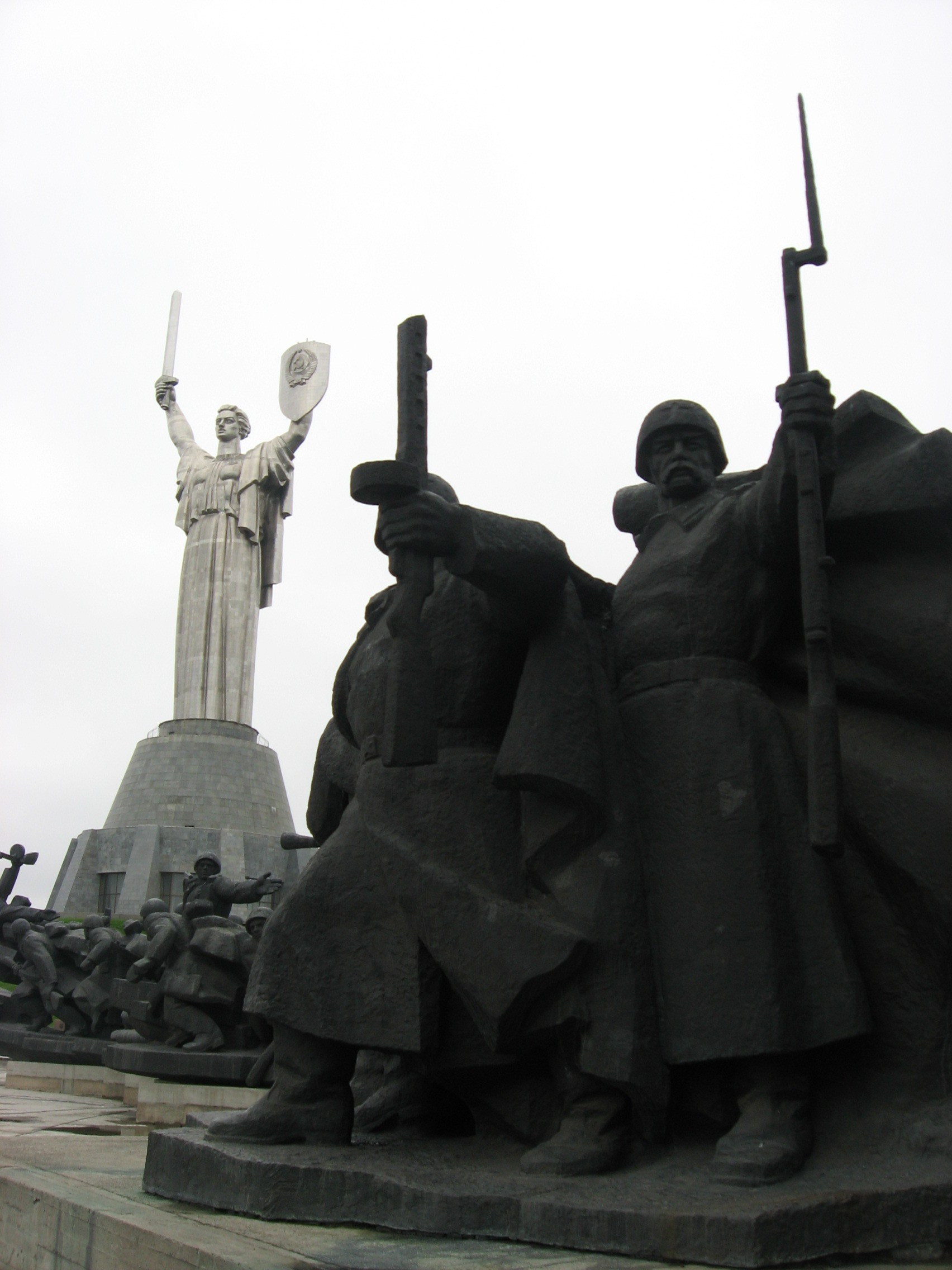
...before continuing to Ukraine and the Pit Stop at the base of The Motherland Monument overlooking downtown Kyiv.

- Episode 9: "Being Polite Sucks Sometimes" (November 12, 2006) & Episode 10: "Lookin' Like a Blue-Haired Lady on a Sunday Drive" (November 19, 2006)
- Prize: A trip to Puerto Vallarta, Mexico (awarded to Tyler and James)
- Eliminated: Erwin and Godwin

Locations

- Antananarivo (Cathedral Andohalo)
- Antananarivo → Helsinki, Finland
- Helsinki (Kappeli Café)
- Helsinki → Tampere
- Ylöjärvi (Soppeenharjun Koulu)
- Tampere → Turku
- Lohja (Tytyri Limestone Mine)
- Helsinki (Helsinki Olympic Stadium Tower)
- Helsinki → Kyiv, Ukraine (Boryspil International Airport)
- Oster (Oster Tank School)
- Kyiv (Apartment 33)
- Kyiv (Dance & Groove or National Music Academy of Ukraine)
- Kyiv (Great Patriotic War Museum – The Motherland Monument)

Episode summary (Episode 9)

- At the start of this leg, teams were instructed to fly to Helsinki, Finland. Once there, teams traveled to the Kappeli Café and found a laptop, which they used to watch a video from their loved ones before receiving their next clue. Teams were then directed to travel by train to Tampere and then by taxi to Ylöjärvi, where they followed a marked path outside Soppeenharjun Koulu in order to find their next clue.
- This leg's first Detour was a choice between Swamp This or Swamp That. In Swamp This, teams had to trudge through a bog on cross country skis and complete a one-mile (1.6 km) course. In Swamp That, teams had to complete an obstacle course through a bog, requiring them to crawl, climb, and carry each other. At the end of both tasks, teams retrieved their next clue.
- After the first Detour, teams were directed to travel by train to Turku and then drive to the Tytyri Limestone Mine in Lohja, where they had to ride a tram into the mine before retrieving their next clue.
- In this leg's first Roadblock, one team member had to ride a bike down a steep hill one mile (1.6 km) into the mine to a dig site, where they had to retrieve a piece of limestone before returning to the starting point. They then used provided tools to break the limestone open in order to retrieve their next clue inside.
- After the first Roadblock, teams were instructed to drive to the Helsinki Olympic Stadium to find their next clue. Teams then had to go to the top of the 236-foot (72 m) tower and perform a face-first rappel known as an Angel Dive down the tower before receiving their next clue, which informed them that they had to keep racing.

Episode summary (Episode 10)

- Teams were instructed to fly to the capital city of the country that was the site of the Chernobyl disaster, and had to figure out that their destination was Kyiv, Ukraine. Once there, teams searched outside of the airport for their next clue on the windshield of their marked cars, which directed them to the Oster Tank School.
- In this leg's second Roadblock, one team member had to drive a Soviet-built T-64 tank through a 1.5-mile (2,400 m) oval-shaped training course used for simulated military exercises in order to receive their next clue.
- After the second Roadblock, teams were instructed to return to Kyiv and knock on the door of a particular apartment in order to receive their next clue.
- This leg's second Detour was a choice between Make the Music or Find the Music. In Make the Music, teams had to travel three miles (4.8 km) to Dance & Groove, a hip hop dance club, where they had to write and perform a rap song incorporating the names of all of the nations they'd visited so far in order to receive their next clue. In Find the Music, teams had to travel 2.5 miles (4.0 km) to the National Music Academy of Ukraine. There, they had to search through thousands of pieces of sheet music for Pyotr Ilyich Tchaikovsky's Concert Fantasia for Piano and Orchestra. When teams had the correct music, they had to search the 120 practice rooms to find one of six pianists who could perform the piece for them before handing them their next clue.
- After the second Detour, teams had to check in at the Pit Stop: The Motherland Monument.

Additional notes

- Due to limited availability of flights out of Madagascar, teams were given tickets on a flight from Antananarivo to Paris, but they were under no obligation to use them.
- Leg 9 was a double leg that aired over two episodes.

=== Leg 10 (Ukraine → Morocco) ===
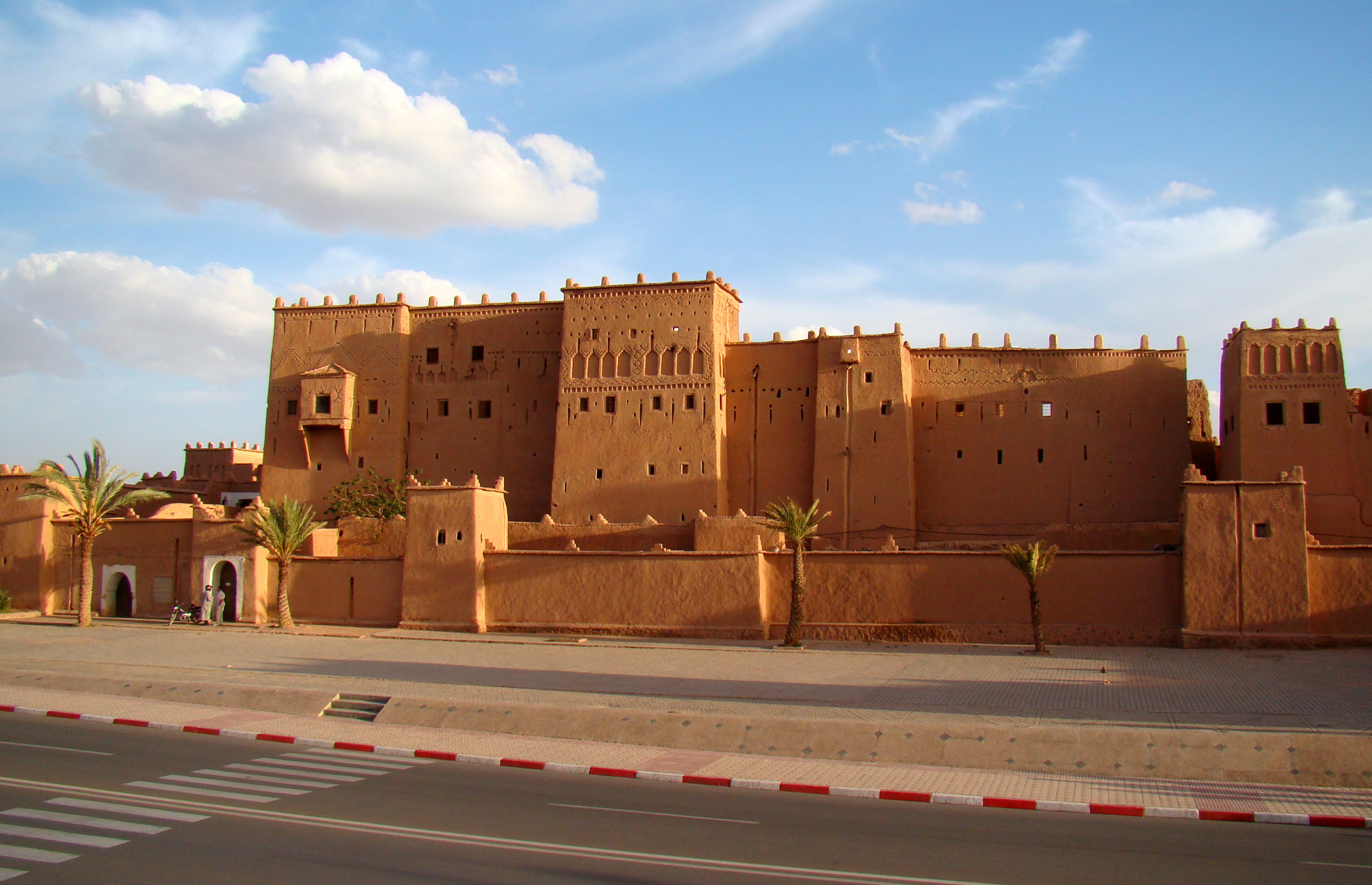
After arriving in Ouarzazate, teams drove to the kasbah and searched for an antique shop.

- Episode 11: "We Just Won't Die, Like Roaches" (November 26, 2006)
- Prize: A mobile phone with a year's subscription for each team member (awarded to Tyler and James)

Locations

- Kyiv (Great Patriotic War Museum – The Motherland Monument)
- Kyiv → Ouarzazate, Morocco
- Ouarzazate (Kasbah Taourirt – Antiquités du Sud)
- Ouarzazate (Atlas Studios)
- Idelssan (Café La Pirgola)
- Guedara (Pottery Shop) or North Africa Horse
- Atlas Mountains (Nomadic Berber Camp)

Episode summary

- At the start of this leg, teams were instructed to fly to Ouarzazate, Morocco. Once there, teams had to find Antiquités du Sud, where they had to choose one of four Hand of Fatima pendants, one of which would match the pendant worn by the Pit Stop greeter. Teams then received their next clue from the shopkeeper, directing them to Atlas Studios, where they had to search the studio's backlot in order find their next clue.
- In this leg's Roadblock, one team member had to dress like a gladiator and ride in a chariot. While racing, racers had to pull down two colored flags matching the plume on their horse in order to receive their next clue.
- After the Roadblock, teams had to drive to Café La Pirgola in Idelssan in order to find their next clue.
- This leg's Detour was a choice between Throw It or Grind It. In Throw It, teams had to drive four miles (6.4 km) to a pottery shop in Guedara, where they had to throw two clay pots on a potter's wheel to the specification of the artisan in order to receive their next clue. In Grind It, teams had to drive four miles (6.4 km) to North Africa Horse, where they had to use a crushing mill to grind 77 pounds (35 kg) of olives and pack them into pressing sleeves before receiving their next clue.
- After the Detour, teams had to drive 25 miles (40 km) towards Marrakesh until they reached a marked boulder directing them towards a Berber camp that served as the Pit Stop.

Additional notes

- The team that held the pendant matching the one worn by the Pit Stop greeter won the prize. This team was Tyler and James.
- Dustin and Kandice chose to Yield Lyn and Karlyn.
- This was a non-elimination leg.

=== Leg 11 (Morocco → Spain) ===
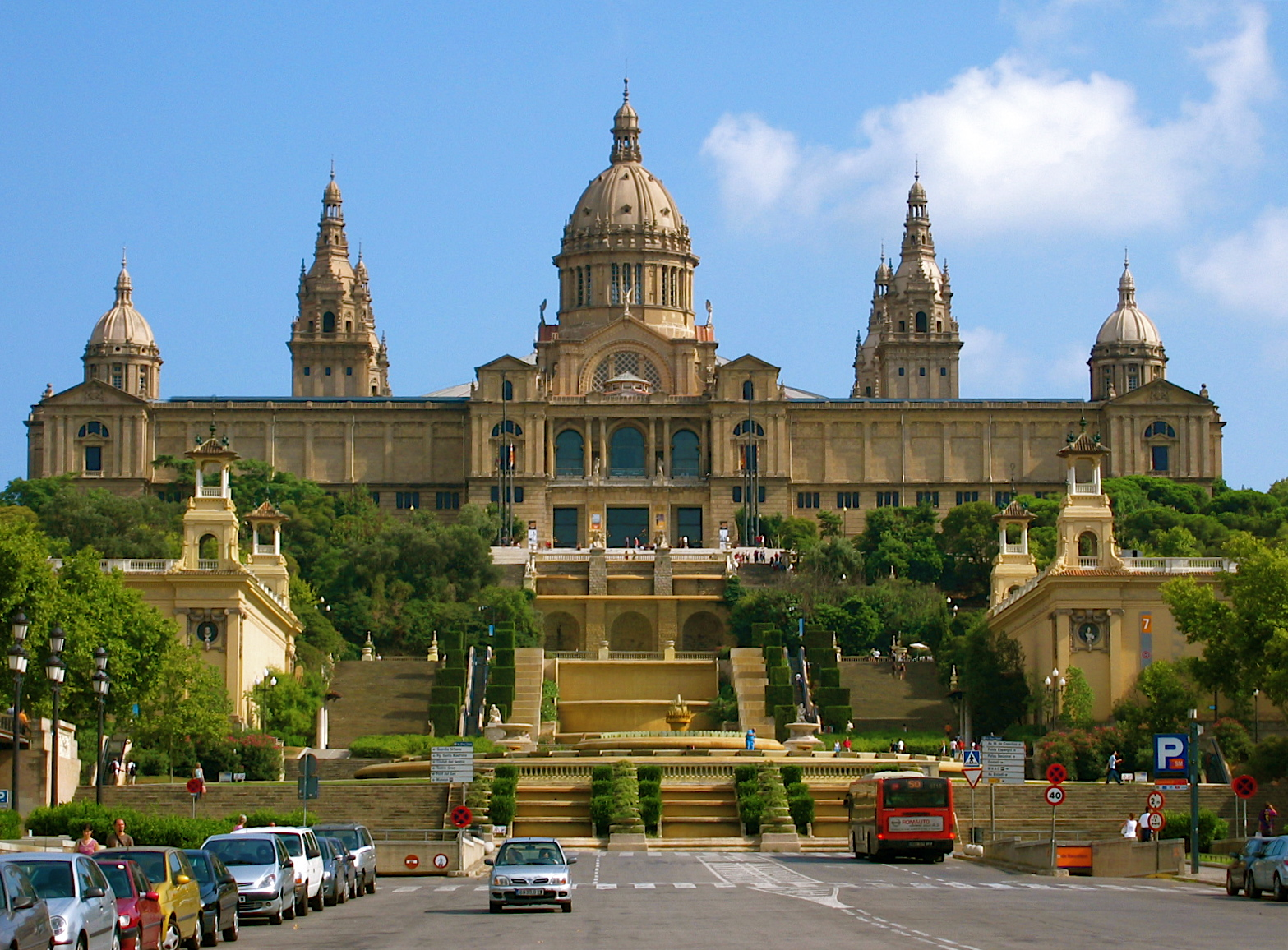
Palau Nacional de Montjuïc in Barcelona was the season's penultimate Pit Stop.

- Episode 12: "Dude, I'm Such a Hot Giant Chick Right Now!" (December 3, 2006)
- Prize: A trip to Barbados (awarded to Rob and Kimberly)
- Eliminated: Dustin and Kandice

Locations

- Atlas Mountains (Nomadic Berber Camp)
- Casablanca (Quartier des Habous)
- Casablanca (Cafe 11)
- Casablanca → Barcelona, Spain
- Barcelona (Parc del Laberint d'Horta)
- Barcelona (Maremagnum Bridge & Plaça de Sant Felip Neri) or Santa Coloma de Cervelló (Colònia Güell)
- Barcelona (Palau Nacional de Montjuïc)

Episode summary

- At the start of this leg, teams were instructed to drive to Casablanca and then search the Quartier des Habous for their next clue.
- In this leg's Roadblock, one team member had to obtain one pound (0.45 kg) of camel meat from a stall and bring it to Cafe 11. There, they had to ground, season, and skewer the meat, give the skewers to a chef to cook, and then to eat the dish in order to receive their next clue.
- After the Roadblock, teams were instructed to fly to Barcelona, Spain. Once there, teams had to travel to Parc del Laberint d'Horta and search the maze for their next clue.
- This leg's Detour was a choice between Lug It or Lob It. In Lug It, teams had to travel to the Maremagnum Bridge and don giant costumes known as gigantes y cabezudos. They then had to walk over a mile wearing their costumes and find a female giant at Plaça de Sant Felip Neri in order to receive their next clue. In Lob It, teams had to travel to Colònia Güell and take part in a tomato festival. While locals threw tomatoes at them, teams had to search a giant pile of tomatoes for one with a clue inside.
- After the Detour, teams had to check in at the Pit Stop: Palau Nacional de Montjuïc.

Additional note

- The Lob It Detour task was later revisited in season 39 as a Switchback.

=== Leg 12 (Spain → France → United States) ===
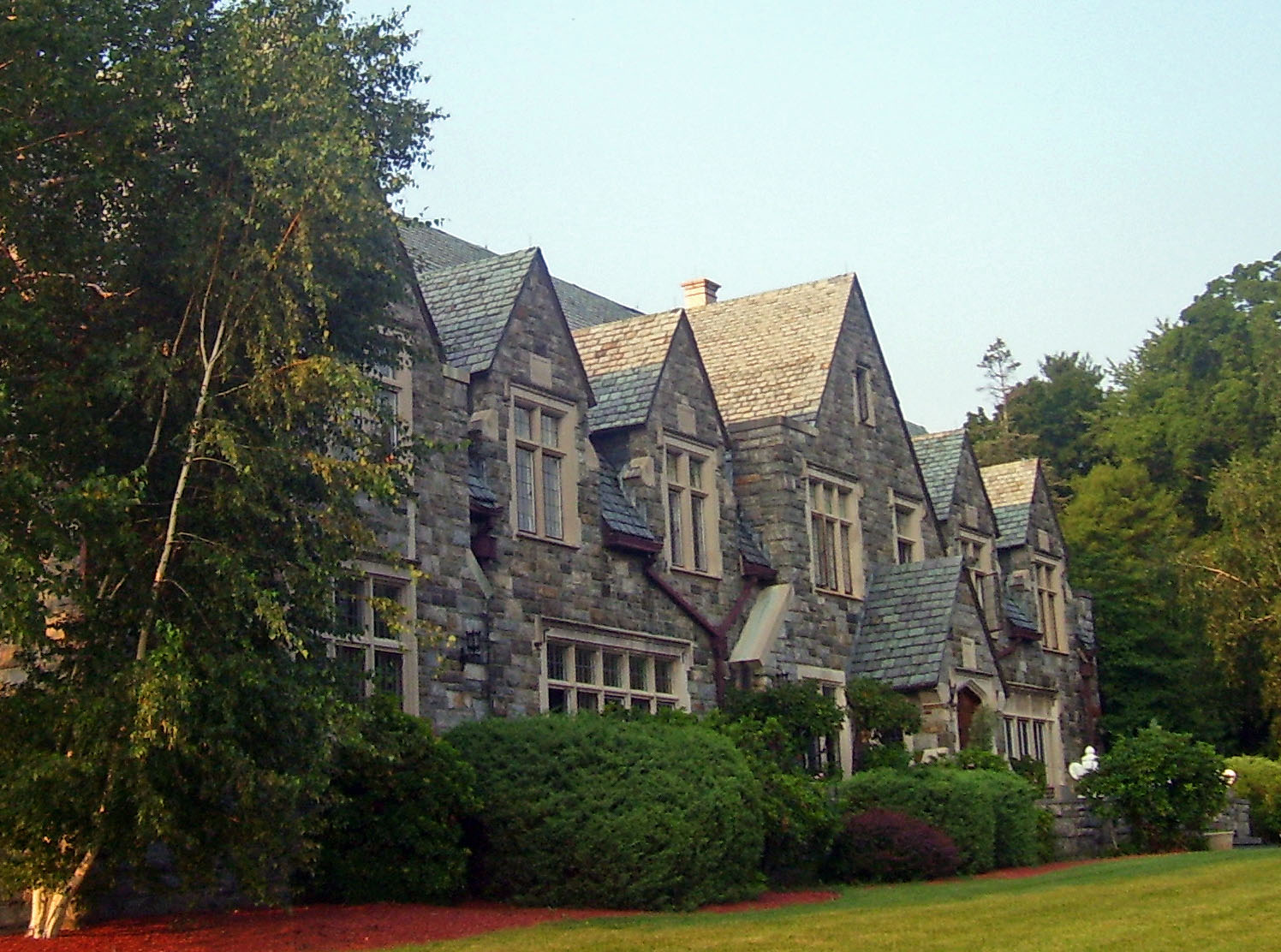
Teams finished The Amazing Race 10 at Saint Basil Academy in Garrison, New York.

- Episode 13: "Say Your Deepest Prayers Ever!" (December 10, 2006)
- Prize: US$1,000,000
- Winners: Tyler and James
- Runners-up: Rob and Kimberly
- Third place: Lyn and Karlyn

Locations

- Barcelona (Palau Nacional de Montjuïc)
- Barcelona (Sagrada Família)
- Barcelona → Paris, France
- Paris (Eiffel Tower)
- Paris → Caen
- Carpiquet (Caen–Carpiquet Airport)
- Bayeux (Gare de Bayeux) → Paris
- Paris (Place de la Concorde – Pont de la Concorde)
- Paris (Anatomy Fashion Studio)
- Paris → New York City, New York
- New York City (Daily News Building)
- New York City (Alamo)
- Garrison (Saint Basil Academy)

Episode summary

- At the start of this leg, teams were instructed to travel to "a church that has been under construction for over 124 years", and teams had to figure out that their next clue was located at the Sagrada Família. Teams then found their next clue: a photograph of the Eiffel Tower. Teams had to fly to Paris, France, travel to the Eiffel Tower, and ride the elevator to the top in order to find their next clue, which instructed them to travel by train to Caen. Once there, teams had to travel to the Caen–Carpiquet Airport to find their next clue.
- In this season's final Roadblock, one team member had to perform a 13,000-foot (4,000 m) tandem skydive with an instructor over Normandy. Their team member remained in the plane and was treated to a surprise nosedive. The skydiver landed on Omaha Beach, received their next clue, and was taken to the Bayeux train station, where they were reunited with their partner.
- After the Roadblock, teams had to travel by train back to Paris and then find their next clue at the Pont de la Concorde.
- This season's final Detour was a choice between Art or Fashion. In Art, teams would have had to go to an art studio on the Rue de Varenne, choose a painting, and then carry it through the streets to a painter at the Pont de la Tournelle, who would have given them their next clue. In Fashion, teams had to travel by foot to Anatomy Fashion Studio, where they had to make a jacket using the tools and materials provided and then put it on a mannequin for display. Once the designer approved their work, she gave them their next clue. All teams chose Fashion.
- After the Detour, teams were instructed to fly to New York City. Once there, teams had to find the Daily News Building and search for their next clue by a giant globe. Teams received a photograph of the Alamo with instructions to travel there on foot. There, teams had to find a woman in a yellow cap, who gave them their final clue directing them to the finish line at Saint Basil Academy in Garrison, New York.

Additional note

- Lyn and Karlyn arrived in Paris from Barcelona at Orly Airport, and chose to return to Orly when it was time to book their flight to New York City. After arriving at Orly, they were informed that they needed to go to Charles de Gaulle International Airport to fly to New York City. They were unable to make the same flight as Tyler and James and Rob and Kimberly, and arrived in New York City after the other teams had already crossed the finish line.

== Reception ==
The Amazing Race 10 received mixed reviews. Linda Holmes of Television Without Pity was critical of this season's boot order, but said, "So was the season disappointing? It was not." Eric Goldman of IGN called it a solid season. Heather Havrilesky of Salon wrote that "after so much shared struggle and heartbreak, we find that we can hardly remember a single detail from our time with these strangers". In 2016, this season was ranked 14th out of the first 27 seasons by the Rob Has a Podcast Amazing Race correspondents. In 2021, Val Barone of TheThings ranked this season as the show's 5th best season. In 2024, Rhenn Taguiam of Game Rant ranked this season tenth. Season 10 won the 2007 Primetime Emmy Award for Outstanding Reality Competition Program. This was the series' fifth consecutive win in that category, having won every year since the category was first introduced in 2003.

== Ratings ==
No. overall	No. in season	Title	Original release date	U.S. viewers (millions)	Rating/share (18–49)
109	1	"Real Fast! Quack, Quack!"	September 17, 2006	10.13	3.9/9
110	2	"Can Horses Smell Fear?"	September 24, 2006	10.57	3.5/9
111	3	"Oh Wow! It's Like One of Those Things You've Seen on TV!"	October 1, 2006	11.75	4.0/9
112	4	"I Know Phil, Little Ol' Gorgeous Thing"	October 8, 2006	10.15	3.5/9
113	5	"I Covered His Mouth, Oh My Gosh!"	October 15, 2006	11.65	4.0/9
114	6	"Maybe Steven Seagal Will See Me and Want Me to Be in One of His Movies"	October 22, 2006	10.89	3.8/9
115	7	"I Wonder if This Is Going to Make My Fingers Prickle"	October 29, 2006	11.66	3.9/9
116	8	"He Can't Swim But He Can Eat Cow Lips!"	November 5, 2006	11.38	3.7/8
117	9	"Being Polite Sucks Sometimes"	November 12, 2006	10.90	3.4/8
118	10	"Lookin' Like a Blue-Haired Lady on a Sunday Drive"	November 19, 2006	12.40	4.1/9
119	11	"We Just Won't Die, Like Roaches"	November 26, 2006	10.37	3.3/8
120	12	"Dude, I'm Such a Hot Giant Chick Right Now!"	December 3, 2006	10.60	3.5/8
121	13	"Say Your Deepest Prayers Ever!"	December 10, 2006	12.73	4.1/9

== Works cited ==
- Castro, Adam-Troy (2006). My Ox Is Broken!. BenBella Books. ISBN 978-1-932100-91-4.
