= Sarah Reinertsen =

American Paralympic triathlete

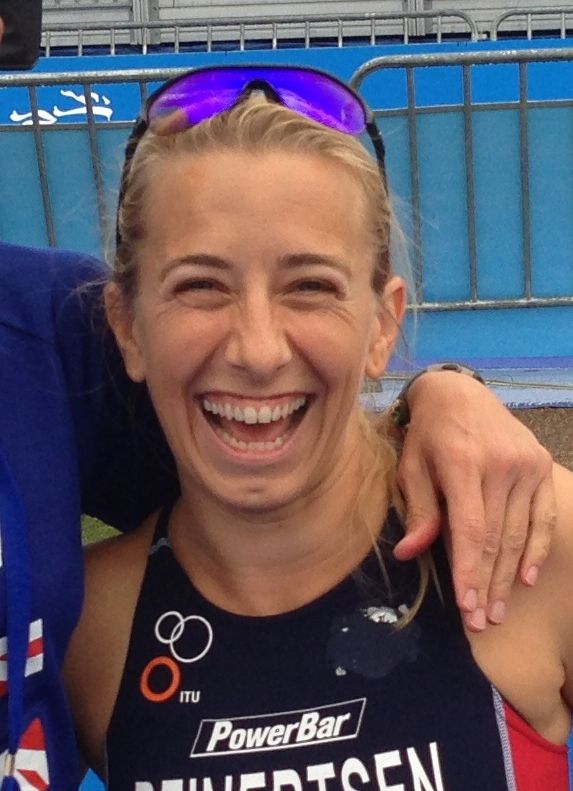

Personal information
- Born: May 22, 1975 (age 51) New York, U.S.
- Height: 5 ft 0 in (1.52 m)
- Website: www.alwaystri.com

Sport
- Sport: paratriathlete
- Disability: proximal femoral focal deficiency
- Disability class: TRI-2
Medal record
Representing United States
Women's Paratriathlon
World Championships
Gold medal – first place	2003 New Zealand	AWAD
Gold medal – first place	2007 Hamburg	Tri 2
Gold medal – first place	2009 Gold Coast	Tri 2
Silver medal – second place	2011 Beijing	Tri 2
Bronze medal – third place	2013 London	Tri 2
Americas Championships
Bronze medal – third place	2016 Sarasota	PT2
- Updated on 16 February 2017

Sarah Reinertsen (born 22 May 1975) is an American Paralympic triathlete and former track athlete. She was born with proximal femoral focal deficiency, a bone-growth disorder; her affected leg was amputated above the knee at age seven.

== Early athletics career ==
Inspired by amputee marathon runner Paddy Rossbach, Reinertsen began to run at age 11. At her first international track meet, when she was 13, she broke the 100 m world record for female above-knee amputees. Her T42 400 m world record time, set in 1999, still stands today.

Reinertsen was a member of the US Disabled Track Team for 7 years. She represented the US at the 1992 Summer Paralympics but found herself racing arm amputees due to low numbers of female competitors. Although she was then world record holder in her own classification, she came last in her heat.

== Ironman Triathlon and other endurance events ==
Reinertsen was the first female leg amputee to complete the Ironman World Championship in Kona, Hawaii. She first attempted the race in 2004, but was disqualified when she reached the end of the bike course 15 minutes after cut-off time. She returned to Kona in 2005, with a motto of 'Unfinished Business', and crossed the finish line in just over 15 hours.

Reinertsen has run marathons around the world, including NYC, LA, Millennium New Zealand, London and Boston. In 2011, she was the first female leg amputee to run in the Great Wall Marathon in China, completing the 10k event in 1:49.

Reinertsen has broken the women's above-knee amputee marathon record several times but does not currently hold it.

== ITU Paratriathlon ==
In 2003, 2007 and 2009, Reinertsen was ITU Paratriathlon World Champion in her classification. She placed second (behind Melissa Stockwell) in 2011. Reinertsen was a member of the USA Triathlon Paratriathlon National Team in 2008, 2009, 2010 and 2011.

While better-known for her success in Ironman Triathlon, Reinertsen states that her "focus for 2013 and beyond is to train to qualify for the (newly introduced, sprint distance) triathlon event at the Paralympics in 2016".

== The Amazing Race ==
In 2006, Reinertsen competed with her friend, Ironman and prosthetist Peter Harsch, on The Amazing Race 10, where they were eliminated in 7th place.

== Honors and awards ==
- 1991: US Olympic Committee Best Female Athlete with a Disability
- 1998: New York Road Runners Club & Achilles Track Club Female Athlete of the Year
- 2004: San Diego Hall of Champions Challenged Athlete Star of the Year
- 2006: Best Female Athlete with a Disability ESPY Award
- 2006: USAT Best Female Physically Challenged Triathlete of the Year

== Miscellaneous ==
Reinertsen is a spokesperson for Ossur and the Challenged Athletes Foundation.

In 2004, she was featured on the cover of Runner's World and named one of the first eight "Heroes of Running" in the magazine. She has also appeared on the cover of Triathlete magazine, Max Sports & Fitness and Competitor, and was photographed naked for ESPN's The Body Issue. Reinertsen was featured in the 2008 Lincoln MKZ 'Reach Higher' campaign and the 2011 'Nike Throwdown' TV commercial. Alongside elite athletes including Mirinda Carfrae, Chris Lieto, Nathan Adrian and Dara Torres, she is one of the faces of the 2012 Team Refuel/Got Chocolate Milk? campaign.

In 2009, Reinertsen released a memoir, In a Single Bound: Losing My Leg, Finding Myself and Training for Life.

She graduated from The George Washington University's Elliott School of International Affairs with a BA in Communication and International Affairs, and received her MA in Broadcast Journalism from the University of Southern California. Formerly a sports journalist, once working for NBC, she is now a motivational speaker.

A native of New York, Reinertsen now lives and trains in California.
