= The Body Issue =

Annual ESPN special release magazine

- Best-selling of six alternative covers of ESPN The Magazine's original Body Issue in 2009 featuring Serena Williams
- Frequency: Yearly
- First issue: October 19, 2009
- Final issue: September 6, 2019
- Company: ESPN
- Country: United States
- Language: English

The Body Issue was an annual edition of ESPN The Magazine that featured dozens of athletes in nude and semi-nude photographs, which was intended to rival the annual Swimsuit Issue from Sports Illustrated. The first issue debuted on October 19, 2009.

The 2009 edition had six alternative covers featuring Serena Williams (tennis), Carl Edwards (NASCAR), Adrian Peterson (NFL), Dwight Howard (NBA), Gina Carano (mixed martial arts) and Sarah Reinertsen (triathlons). The Serena Williams edition sold the most copies. The 2009 issue was a financial success, achieving double the normal edition sales, greater sales than any bi-weekly issue in over two years and 35 percent more ad sales than comparable issues, which led to plans for extended marketing of the 2010 edition.

The edition included regular sports coverage. In the bodies section athletes were featured on and off the field. Even a picture during a knee surgery was included. The "Bodies We Want" section was a feature of the best bodies in the world of sports all posed nude but with strategic coverage of private parts. Another section showed the damage done to the human body in athletics such as Laird Hamilton's cracked heel and Torry Holt's crooked middle finger. One action photo captured six members of Major League Soccer's D.C. United simulating a free kick defensive wall while covering their genitalia.

The 2019 issue was announced as also being the final print edition of the magazine. It was said it would continue in a digital form but this did not materialize.

== 2009 ==
Some of the 2009 covers were revealed on shows such Monday Night Football and Good Morning America. This marked the only year that athletes could wear some clothing before they were required to be fully nude beginning in the 2010 issue. The 2009 edition included the following:

- American football: Casey Hampton, Torry Holt, Adrian Peterson
- Association football: Natasha Kai, Bryan Namoff, Oguchi Onyewu, Chris Pontius, Clyde Simms
- Baseball: Joba Chamberlain, Nelson Cruz, Iván Rodríguez
- Basketball: Dwight Howard, Cappie Pondexter
- Beach volleyball: Carol Hamilton, Greg Hunter, Noah Kaiser, Eddie Matz, Michele Rauter, Tim Struby
- Boxing: Manny Pacquiao
- Figure skating: Johnny Weir
- Golf: Sandra Gal, Anna Grzebien, Christina Kim
- Gymnastics: Shawn Johnson
- Horse racing: Alex Solis
- Ice hockey: Zdeno Chára, Bill Guerin, Chris Higgins, Mike Komisarek, Sheldon Souray
- Mixed martial arts: Gina Carano, Randy Couture
- Poker: World Series of Poker players
- Rock climbing: Steph Davis
- Rowing: Susan Francia
- Short-track speed skating: Allison Baver
- Skiing: Kristi Leskinen, Julia Mancuso
- Softball: Jessica Mendoza
- Stock car racing: Carl Edwards, Mark Martin
- Sumo wrestling: Byambajav Ulambayaryn
- Surfing: Claire Bevilacqua, Laird Hamilton
- Swimming: Ryan Lochte
- Table tennis: Biljana "Biba" Golić
- Tennis: James Blake, Serena Williams
- Track and field: Michelle Carter, Lolo Jones, Sarah Reinertsen
- Weightlifting: Cheryl Haworth

== 2010 ==
The 2010 edition included the following:

- American football: Patrick Willis
- American football/Mixed martial arts: Herschel Walker
- Association football: Tim Howard
- Alpine skiing: Julia Mancuso
- Archery: Erika Anschutz
- Basketball: Amar'e Stoudemire, Diana Taurasi
- Billiards: Jeanette Lee
- Bobsledding: Steven Holcomb
- Figure skating: Evan Lysacek
- Golf: Camilo Villegas
- Track and field: Rachel Yurkovich
- Mixed martial arts: Cristiane Justino, Evangelista Santos
- Surfing: Kelly Slater
- Swimming: Jeff Farrell
- Track and field: Philipa Raschker
- Water polo: United States women's national water polo team
- Volleyball: Kim Glass
- Wheelchair tennis: Esther Vergeer

== 2011 ==
The 2011 edition included the following:

- American football: Steven Jackson
- Association football: Hope Solo
- Badminton: Robert Blair, Gabby White
- Baseball: José Reyes
- Basketball: Blake Griffin, Sylvia Fowles
- Bowling: Kelly Kulick
- Boxing: Sergio Martínez
- Figure Skating: Amanda Evora, Mark Ladwig
- Golf: Belen Mozo
- Gymnastics: Alicia Sacramone
- Ice hockey: Julie Chu, Ryan Kesler
- Indy car racing: Hélio Castroneves
- Mixed martial arts: Jon "Bones" Jones
- NHRA: John Force
- Para-athletics: Jeremy Campbell
- Roller derby: Suzy Hotrod
- Running: Ryan Hall
- Soccer: Arizona Aresnal players
- Short-track speed skating: Apolo Ohno
- Snowboarding: Gretchen Bleiler, Louie Vito
- Surfing: Stephanie Gilmore
- Tennis: Vera Zvonareva
- Track and field: Natasha Hastings

== 2012 ==
The 2012 issue featured the following athletes:

- American football: Maurice Jones-Drew, Rob Gronkowski
- Association football: Carlos Bocanegra, Abby Wambach
- Baseball: José Bautista
- Basketball: Candace Parker, Tyson Chandler
- Decathlon: Ashton Eaton
- Fencing: Tim Morehouse
- Golf: Suzann Pettersen
- Gymnastics: Danell Leyva
- Horse racing: Mike Smith
- Ice hockey: Brad Richards
- Mixed martial arts: Ronda Rousey
- Rowing: Oksana Masters
- Sailing: Anna Tunnicliffe
- Surfing: Maya Gabeira
- Tennis: Daniela Hantuchová
- Track and field: Carmelita Jeter, Walter Dix
- Volleyball: 2012 U.S. Women's National Volleyball Team (Destinee Hooker, Megan Hodge, Alisha Glass, Stacy Sykora)

== 2013 ==
The 2013 issue featured the following athletes:

- American football: Colin Kaepernick, Vernon Davis
- Association football: Sydney Leroux
- Baseball: Giancarlo Stanton, Matt Harvey
- Basketball: John Wall, Kenneth Faried, Swin Cash
- Boxing: Marlen Esparza
- Golf: Carly Booth, Gary Player
- Ice hockey: Joffrey Lupul
- Mixed martial arts: Miesha Tate
- Motocross: Tarah Gieger
- NHRA drag racing: Courtney Force
- Rock Climbing: Chris Sharma, Daila Ojeda
- Snowboarding: Elena Hight
- Tennis: Agnieszka Radwańska, John Isner
- Volleyball: Kerri Walsh Jennings

== 2014 ==
The 2014 issue featured the following athletes:

- American football: Marshawn Lynch, Larry Fitzgerald
- Association football: Omar Gonzalez, Megan Rapinoe
- Baseball: Prince Fielder
- Basketball: Serge Ibaka, Angel McCoughtry
- BMX bike motocross: Nigel Sylvester
- Bobsledding: Aja Evans
- Boxing: Bernard Hopkins, Danyelle Wolf
- Cliff Diving: Ginger Huber
- Ice hockey: Hilary Knight
- Motocross : Travis Pastrana
- Skateboarding: Lyn-Z Adams Hawkins
- Snowboarding: Jamie Anderson, Amy Purdy
- Surfing: Coco Ho
- Swimming: Michael Phelps
- Tennis: Venus Williams, Tomáš Berdych
- Yachting: Jimmy Spithill

== 2015 ==
The 2015 issue featured the following athletes:

- American football: Anthony Castonzo, Jack Mewhort, Odell Beckham Jr., Todd Herremans
- Archery: Khatuna Lorig
- Association football: Ali Krieger, Jermaine Jones
- Baseball: Bryce Harper
- Basketball: Brittney Griner, DeAndre Jordan, Kevin Love
- Field hockey: Paige Selenski
- Golf: Sadena Parks
- Gymnastics: Aly Raisman
- Ice hockey: Tyler Seguin
- Rugby union: Todd Clever
- Skateboarding: Leticia Bufoni
- Surfing: Laird Hamilton
- Swimming: Natalie Coughlin
- Tennis: Stan Wawrinka
- Track and field: Amanda Bingson, Chantae McMillan
- Volleyball: Gabrielle Reece
- Wakeboarding: Dallas Friday

== 2016 ==
The 2016 issue featured the following athletes:

- American football: Antonio Brown, Von Miller, Vince Wilfork
- Association football: Christen Press
- Baseball: Jake Arrieta
- Basketball: Dwyane Wade, Elena Delle Donne
- Beach Volleyball: April Ross
- Boxing: Claressa Shields
- Diving: Greg Louganis
- Duathlon: Chris Mosier
- Fencing (Olympics): Nzingha Prescod
- Motocross: Ryan Dungey
- Paratriathlete: Allysa Seely
- Surfing: Courtney Conlogue
- Swimming: Nathan Adrian
- Track and field: Emma Coburn
- UFC: Conor McGregor
- Wrestling: Adeline Gray

== 2017 ==
The 2017 issue featured the following athletes:

- American football: Julian Edelman, Ezekiel Elliott, Zach Ertz
- Association football: Julie Ertz
- Baseball: Javier Baez
- Basketball: Isaiah Thomas, Nneka Ogwumike
- Figure skating: Ashley Wagner
- Ice Hockey: Brent Burns, Joe Thornton, US Women's National Ice Hockey Team (Brianna Decker, Kacey Bellamy, Meghan Duggan, Jocelyne Lamoureux, Monique Lamoureux, Alex Rigsby)
- Mixed martial arts: Michelle Waterson
- Rugby: Malakai Fekitoa
- Skiing: Gus Kenworthy
- Snowboarding: Kirstie Ennis
- Softball: AJ Andrews
- Tennis: Caroline Wozniacki
- Track and field: Novlene Williams-Mills

== 2018 ==
The 2018 issue featured the following athletes:

- American football: Saquon Barkley, Jerry Rice
- Association football: Crystal Dunn, Zlatan Ibrahimović, Megan Rapinoe
- Baseball : Dallas Keuchel, Yasiel Puig
- Basketball: Sue Bird, Breanna Stewart, Karl-Anthony Towns
- Figure Skating: Adam Rippon
- Golf: Greg Norman
- Professional wrestling: Charlotte Flair
- Skiing: Jessie Diggins
- Softball: Lauren Chamberlain
- Track and field: Tori Bowie

Bird and Rapinoe, who were photographed together, became the first same-sex couple to appear on the cover of the magazine. Rapinoe was also the only athlete to ever pose for the issue more than once.

== 2019 ==
The 2019 issue released on September 4, 2019 and was the final printed issue of the ESPN Magazine. It featured the following athletes:

- American football: Myles Garrett, Michael Thomas, the Philadelphia Eagles offensive line (Brandon Brooks, Lane Johnson, Jason Kelce, Isaac Seumalo, Halapoulivaati Vaitai)
- Association football: Kelley O'Hara
- Baseball: Christian Yelich
- Basketball: Chris Paul, Liz Cambage, Nancy Lieberman
- Crossfit: Katrín Davíðsdóttir
- Golf: Brooks Koepka
- Gymnastics: Katelyn Ohashi
- Ice Hockey: Evander Kane
- Racing: James Hinchcliffe
- Rock Climber: Alex Honnold
- Surfer: Lakey Peterson
- Track and field: Scout Bassett
- UFC: Amanda Nunes
