= Lake Anosy =

- Lac Anosy (French)
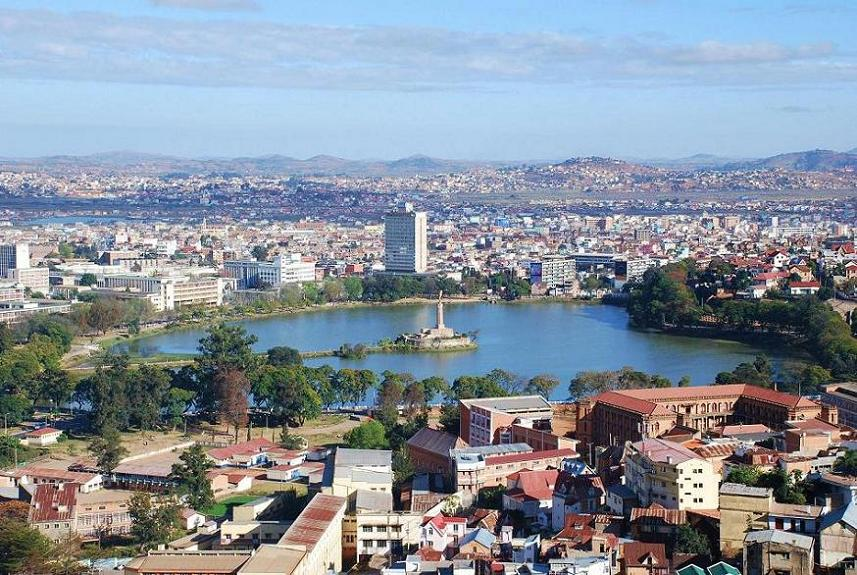
- Lake Anosy, Central Antananarivo, Madagascar City

- Location within Madagascar
- Location: Antananarivo, Madagascar
- Coordinates: 18°54′55″S 47°31′18″E
- Type: Reservoir

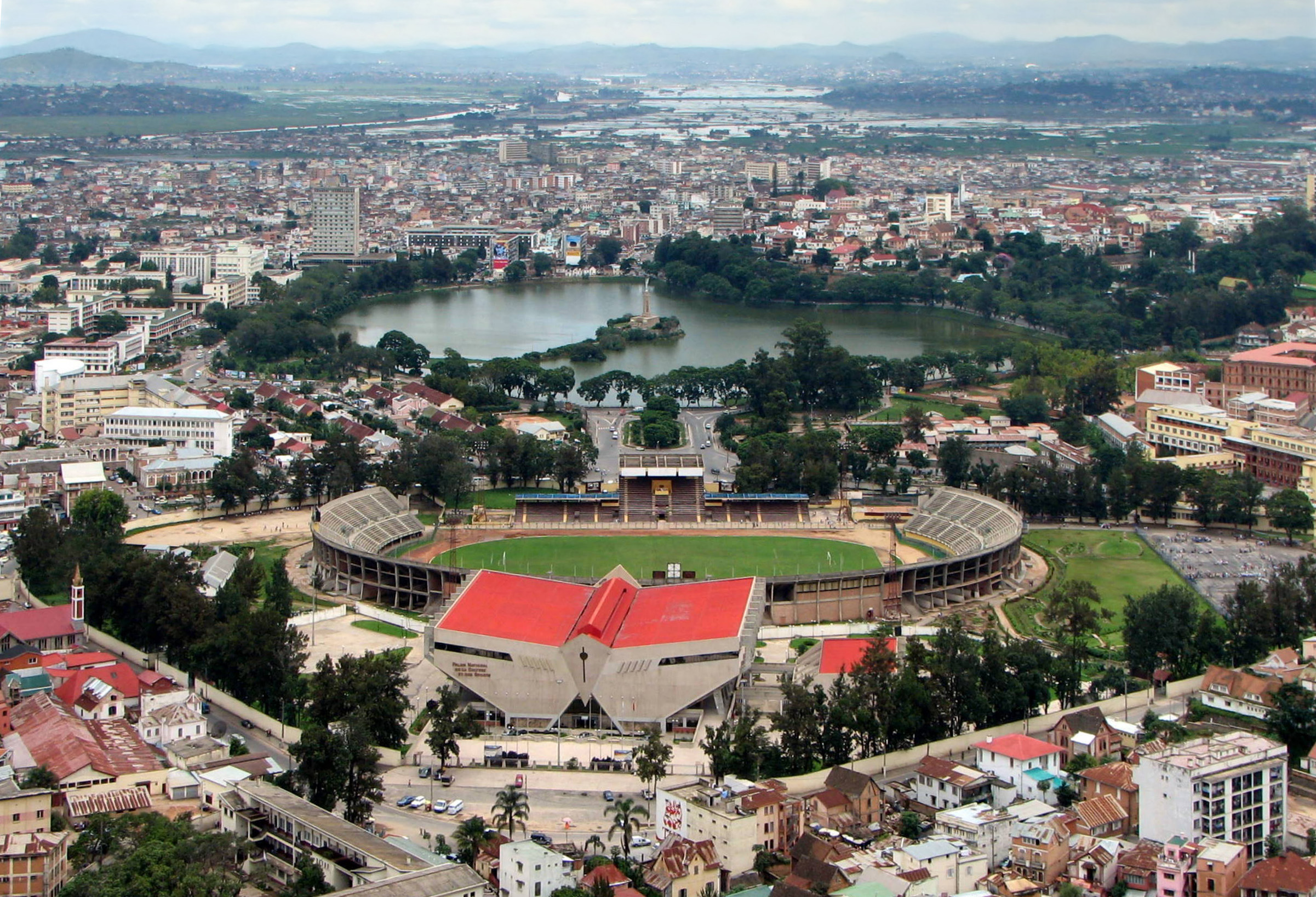
Lake Anosy in Antananarivo

Lake Anosy [anˈuːsi] (French: Lac Anosy) is an artificial lake in the southern part of the capital city of Madagascar, Antananarivo, about two miles south of Haute-Ville. Ampefiloha is located to the west of the lake, Isoraka to the northwest and Mahamasina to the north.

Originally a swamp, Lake Anosy began construction during the era of King Radama I by Scottish missionary James Cameron, who made it in the shape of a heart. The center of the lake has a small islet, which is connected to the city by an isthmus. The islet was originally chosen as the location to construct a blacksmith workshop, due to concerns of fire spreading to the wood and thatch-roofed buildings that were common at the time.

Today, the islet hosts a monument aux mort named Black Angel (French: l'Ange Noir) to commemorate the Malagasy soldiers who died fighting for the French in World War I. This monument was created by sculptor Barberis and architect Perrin in 1927. The lake hosts a firework festival every year during Madagascar's Independence Day.

The lakeside has jacaranda trees, which bloom violet flowers in October. Great egrets used to rest by the lake. There are barber's kiosks by the southern shore.
